= List of places in Preston, Lancashire =

This is a partial list of places in Preston, Lancashire. As well as the urban settlement of Preston, it also includes places within the larger City of Preston local government district.

== Suburbs ==
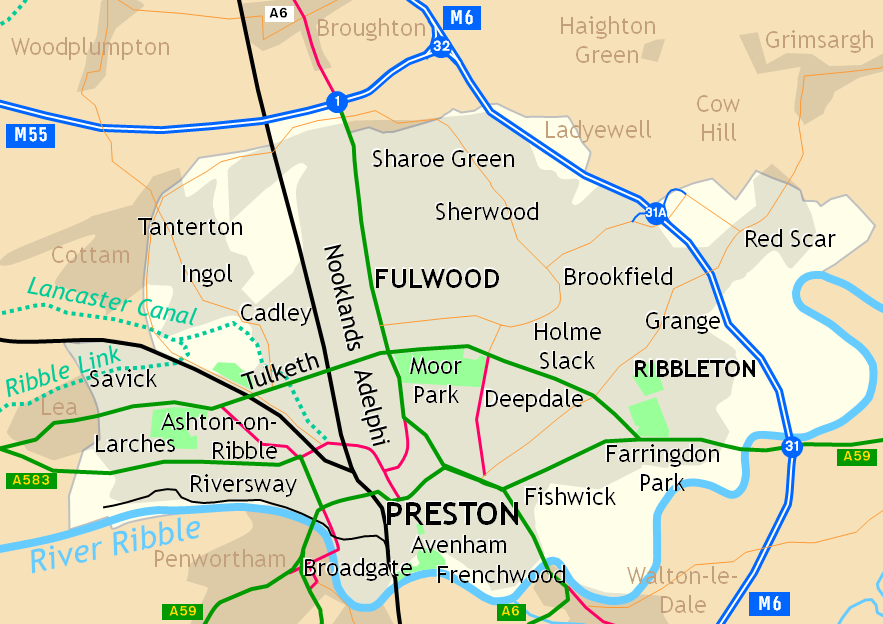
Places in the settlement of Preston

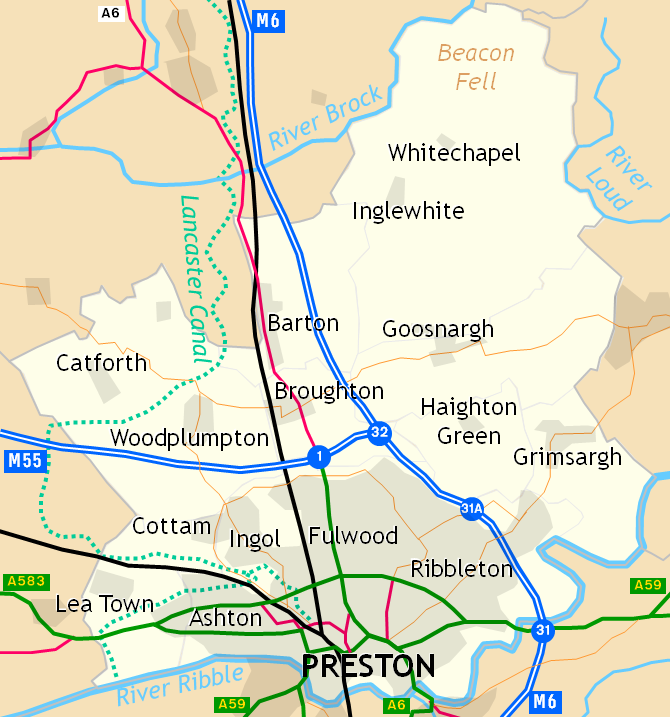
Places in the City of Preston district

- Ashton-on-Ribble
- Fulwood
- Ingol
- Lea
- Ribbleton

== Estates/Localities ==
- Adelphi
- Avenham
- Broadgate
- Brookfield
- Cadley
- Callon
- Deepdale
- Farringdon Park
- Fishwick
- Frenchwood
- Grange
- Greenlands
- Holme Slack
- Lane Ends
- Larches
- Longsands
- Maudlands
- Moor Nook
- Plungington
- Savick
- Sharoe Green
- Sherwood
- Tanterton
- Wychnor

== Villages ==
- Barton
- Broughton
- Cottam
- Goosnargh
- Grimsargh
- Haighton
- Inglewhite
- Whitechapel
- Woodplumpton

== Civil parishes ==
Civil parishes in the City of Preston
- Barton
- Broughton
- Goosnargh
- Grimsargh
- Haighton
- Ingol and Tanterton (neighbourhood, since 2012)
- Lea
- Whittingham
- Woodplumpton

== Rivers, brooks and water features ==
- River Brock (bordering)
- Lancaster Canal
- River Loud (bordering)
- River Ribble (bordering)
- Ribble Link

== Footpaths and cycle routes ==
The Preston Guild Wheel is a cycle route which orbits the city with 'spokes' joining the city centre to the wheel. The council opened the route in time for the city's 2012 Guild celebrations.

== Woods ==
- Asda Wood, Fulwood
- Beacon Fell Country Park, Goosnargh
- Brockholes Wood, Ribbleton
- Clough Copse, Fulwood
- Fernyhalgh Wood, Fulwood
- Fishwick Local Nature Reserve Acc, Fishwick
- Fishwick Local Nature Reserve Site, Fishwick
- Grange Valley Open Space, Ribbleton
- Masons Wood, Fulwood
- Midgery Wood, Fulwood
- Moss Leach Wood, Fulwood
- Preston Guild Wheel, Ribbleton
- Preston Guild Wheel, Riversway
- Preston Guild Wheel, Savick
- Sandybrook Woods, Fulwood
- Tom Benson Walk, Tanterton
- Turnbrook Woods. Grimsargh

== Parks ==
- Ashton Park
- Avenham Park
- Grange Park
- Haslam Park
- Miller Park
- Moor Park
- Ribbleton Park (formerly known as Waverley Park)

== Notable buildings ==
- Chingle Hall
- Harris Museum
- Preston bus station
- Preston railway station

== Miscellaneous ==
- Ladyewell

== Areas outside of the Preston City Council boundaries ==
Preston sub-division of Preston Urban Area	PRESTON post town area

Preston's city centre is on the city's southern border with the South Ribble borough. This means that some of the areas and towns in Preston Urban Area and PRESTON post town are not within the area administered by Preston City Council.
