= Districts of Preston =

Electoral divisions of Preston, England

Preston is a city of Lancashire, England. The districts of Preston vary in size and shape, many of which reflect the districts developed from former villages and boroughs which now lie within the boundaries of the city of Preston. Districts of Preston have little administrative purpose: for local elections voters in each return either two, or three, councillors to Town Hall. For the purposes of national General elections, the parliamentary constituencies representing the city use the electoral districts as "building bricks"

== Present day divisions ==
The City of Preston is divided into 22 wards, which are used in the creation of "Area Forums", local consultative bodies organised by city council; and also the composition of parliamentary constituencies.

Electors in each ward return two, or three, electors to Town Hall in elections, results of which can be found at Preston local elections.

Since 2010, the City of Preston has been covered by three parliamentary constituencies, Preston, Wyre and Preston North and Fylde. Those wards formerly within the Ribble Valley constituency, on the whole, now form the southern flank of the newly created constituency of Wyre and Preston North.

The wards are used to build electoral divisions for elections to Lancashire County Council. The unparished area of Preston (or urban core) had a population of 122,719 in 2011 and did not include the wards Preston Rural North, Preston Rural East and Lea. The wider city and non metropolitan district had a population of 140,202 in the same census.

Map	County Council division	Ward	Area forum	Parishes	Other places	Parliamentary constituency (from 2010)
	Preston; Rural	1. Preston Rural North	Rural	1a. Barton	Newsham	Wyre and Preston North
	Preston; Rural	1. Preston Rural North	Rural	1b. Goosnargh	Beacon Fell, Inglewhite, Whitechapel	Wyre and Preston North
	Preston; Rural	1. Preston Rural North	Rural	1c. Whittingham	Goosnargh, Cumeragh Village	Wyre and Preston North
	Preston; Rural	1. Preston Rural North	Rural	1d. Woodplumpton	Catforth, Eaves, Higher Bartle, Nog Tow	Wyre and Preston North
	Preston; Rural	2. Preston Rural East	Rural	2a. Broughton	Fernyhalgh	Wyre and Preston North
	Preston; Rural	2. Preston Rural East	Rural	2b. Grimsargh	Elston	Wyre and Preston North
	Preston; Rural	2. Preston Rural East	Rural	2c. Haighton	Cow Hill, Haighton Green, Haighton Top	Wyre and Preston North
	Preston; North	3. Cadley	North (Fulwood)	unparished area (Preston)	Nooklands	Wyre and Preston North
	Preston; North	4. Greyfriars	North (Fulwood)	unparished area (Preston)		Wyre and Preston North
	Preston; North East	5. Garrison	North (Fulwood)	unparished area (Preston)	Fulwood Row, Ladyewell	Wyre and Preston North
	Preston; North East	6. Sharoe Green	North (Fulwood)	unparished area (Preston)	Sherwood	Wyre and Preston North
	Preston; Central North	7. College	North (Fulwood)	unparished area (Preston)		Wyre and Preston North
	Preston; Central North	8. Deepdale	East	unparished area (Preston)	Holme Slack	Preston
	Preston; Central North	9. Moor Park	Central	unparished area (Preston)		Preston
	Preston; Central South	10. St George's	Central	unparished area (Preston)	Adelphi	Preston
	Preston; Central South	11. Tulketh	Central	unparished area (Preston)	Lane Ends, Maudlands	Preston
	Preston; Central South	12. University	Central	unparished area (Preston)	Adelphi, Maudlands	Preston
	Preston; City	13. Riversway	Central	unparished area (Preston)	Broadgate, Christ Church	Preston
	Preston; City	14. Town Centre	Central	unparished area (Preston)	Avenham, Frenchwood, Winckley Square	Preston
	Preston; South East	15. Fishwick	East	unparished area (Preston)	Farringdon Park	Preston
	Preston; South East	16. St Matthew's	East	unparished area (Preston)		Preston
	Preston; East	17. Brookfield	East	unparished area (Preston)		Preston
	Preston; East	18. Ribbleton	East	unparished area (Preston)	Farringdon Park, Grange, Red Scar, Ribbleton Hall	Preston
	Preston; North West	19. Ashton	West	unparished area (Preston)		Preston
	Preston; North West	20. Larches	West	unparished area (Preston)	Savick	Preston
	Preston; West	21. Ingol	West	Ingol and Tanterton	Tanterton	Preston
	Preston; West	22. Lea	West	Lea	Cottam, Lea Town	Fylde

The wards of Preston Rural North, Preston Rural East and Lea are parished: they contain parish councils with their own structure and elected councillors. All the other wards lie in an unparished area and are governed directly by Preston City Council.

== Comparison of areas called "Preston" ==
The name "Preston" is associated with a number of different areas that are related to the city:

Name	Preston	City of Preston	Preston conurbation	Preston Urban Area	Preston Metropolitan Area	PRESTON	PR postcode area also known as Preston postcode area
Map	shown within the City of Preston		shown with the parishes of the City of Preston	shown within Central Lancashire		shown within the PR postcode area	
Type	unparished area	local government district	conurbation	ONS urban area	metropolitan area	post town	postcode area
Population (2001)	112,019	129,633	184,836	264,601	354,000		
Extent	Preston city centre, Fulwood, Ribbleton, Ashton-on-Ribble, (Ingol until 2012)	Preston (unparished area), Barton, Broughton, Grimsargh, Goosnargh, Haighton, Ingol and Tanterton, Lea, Whittingham, Woodplumpton	urban parts of: Preston (unparished area), Cottam, Lea, Ingol, Grimsargh, Penwortham, Bamber Bridge, Walton-le-Dale, Clayton Brook, Whittle-le-Woods, Walton Summit, Farington, Lostock Hall, Tardy Gate	the five conurbations: Preston; Leyland, Chorley, Euxton, Wymott Prison	City of Preston, South Ribble, Chorley, eastern half of Wyre, eastern half of Fylde, north east part of West Lancashire, western fringes of Ribble Valley	postcode districts PR1–PR5	post towns: PRESTON, CHORLEY, SOUTHPORT, LEYLAND

== Historical ==
=== Local government ===
- Preston Municipal Borough 1836–1889
- County Borough of Preston 1889–1974
- Fulwood Urban District until 1974
- Preston Rural District 1894–1974

=== UK Parliament constituencies ===
- Preston 1295–1950; 1983–present
- Wyre and Preston North 2010–present
- Preston North 1950–1983
- Preston South 1950–1983
