= Larches, Preston =

District of Preston, Lancashire, England

Coordinates: 53.767°N 2.758°W

Larches
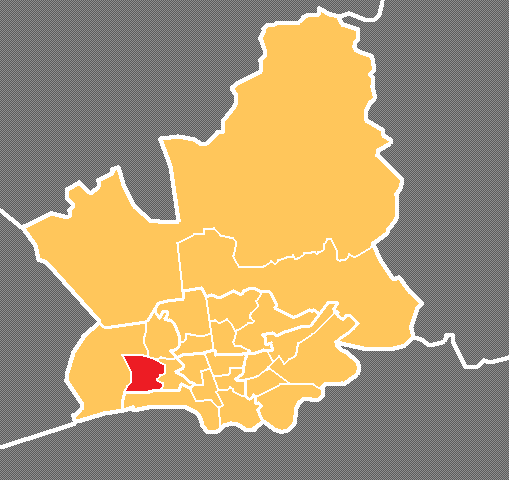
- Location in the City of Preston district

- Location in Preston Location within Lancashire
- Population: 7,500 (2011)
- District: City of Preston
- Ceremonial county: Lancashire
- Region: North West
- Country: England
- Sovereign state: United Kingdom
- UK Parliament: Preston
- Councillors: Rob Osinski – Liberal Democrat; Danny Gallagher – Liberal Democrat; Phil Crowe – Labour

Larches is one of the districts of Preston, Lancashire, England. The area, north-west of Preston city centre, is a mix of social and private housing, although both components of the ward – Larches, and Savick – are largely post-war council estates. Ashton Park is in the middle of the current ward, which borders Riversway and the civil parish of Lea. The area of Larches is part of Ashton-on-Ribble, which was part of the former hundred of Amounderness. With small businesses and shops in the area, the population are largely commute-to-work families and retirees. The citywide Preston Bus service runs through both sides of the Larches ward, and routes operated by Stagecoach between Preston and Blackpool also serve the area. Three members of Preston City Council, elected 'in thirds' in first past the post elections each year, are returned from the ward. The ward and neighbouring Ashton forms part of the Lancashire County Council electoral division of Preston North West.

== Current members ==
Election	Member	Party
2007 Preston Council election	Rob Osinski	Liberal Democrat
2008 Preston Council election	Danny Gallagher	Liberal Democrat
2010 Preston Council election	Phil Crowe	Labour

== Demographics ==
From the 2001 Census, Larches had a population of 7,395. Of this figure, 83% described themselves as Christian. At the 2008 local elections, the valid electorate for Larches ward was 5,657. At the 2011 Census the population had increased to 7,500.

== Geography ==
The ward is in the north-west of the city, with the A5085 Blackpool Road cutting the Larches and Savick components in two. The southern portion borders onto the A583 Riversway by-pass. The housing developments, largely post-war detached and semi-detached houses, are spread out into medium-sized roads and avenues. The Preesall estate is a self-contained development to the north facing the Lea boundary.

== See also ==
- Preston local elections
- Districts of Preston

== Sources ==
- "Existing ward arrangements" (PDF). opsi.gov.uk.
