= St George's, Preston =

Electoral ward in Preston, Lancashire, England

Coordinates: 53.769°N 2.698°W

St George’s
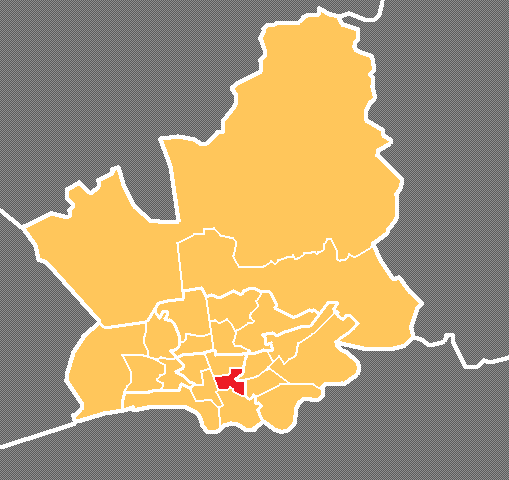
- Location in the City of Preston district

- Location in Preston Location within Lancashire
- Population: 6,084 (2011)
- District: City of Preston
- Ceremonial county: Lancashire
- Region: North West
- Country: England
- Sovereign state: United Kingdom
- UK Parliament: Preston
- Councillors: James Hull – Labour; Taalib Shamsuddin – Labour

St George's is an electoral ward in Preston, Lancashire, England. The ward is adjacent to the larger Deepdale to the east and is considered to be more an area within Deepdale than a distinct community of its own. The ward was created in 2002 for the 2002 Preston Council election, taking in the terraces running from Deepdale Road to St Paul's Road adjacent to Moor Park, running south towards the city centre. The eastern parts of the University of Central Lancashire campus in included within the St George's boundaries. Its name comes from the main road running east–west from Deepdale Road to the A6 Garstang Road. Two members of Preston City Council, elected 'in thirds' in first past the post elections each year, are returned from the ward. The ward forms part of the Lancashire County Council electoral division of Preston Central South.

== Current members ==
Election	Member	Party
2008 Preston Council election	James Hull	Labour Party
2010 Preston Council election	Taalib Shamsuddin	Labour Party

== Demographics ==
From the 2001 census, St George's ward had a population of 5,049. Of this figure, 26.7% described themselves as Muslim. The population at the Census 2011 was measured at 6,084.

== See also ==
- Preston local elections
