= St Matthew's, Preston =

Coordinates: 53.768°N 2.679°W

St Matthew’s
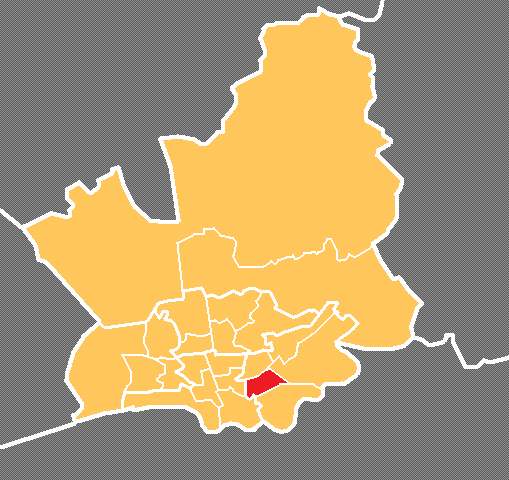
- Location in the City of Preston district

- Location in Preston Location within Lancashire
- Population: 8,187 (2011)
- District: City of Preston
- Ceremonial county: Lancashire
- Region: North West
- Country: England
- Sovereign state: United Kingdom
- UK Parliament: Preston
- Councillors: Javed Iqbal – Labour; Albert Richardson – Labour; Veronica Afrin – Labour

St Matthew's is an electoral ward in Preston, Lancashire, England. The ward is adjacent to the larger Ribbleton to the east but is considered to be an area with a distinct community of its own.

The ward is named after the large St Matthew's Church within its borders. Three members of Preston City Council, elected 'in thirds' in first past the post elections each year, are returned from the ward.

The ward forms part of the Lancashire County Council electoral division of Preston East.

== Demographics ==
The 2001 census showed a population of 6,462 within St Matthew's, of which over half (58%) classed themselves as Christian. The next highest religious population is Muslim at just under 17%. The population at the 2011 Census was 8,187.

Nearly half of the adult population have no education qualifications, one of the highest figures in the city of Preston.

== Boundaries ==
St Matthew's is a rectangle sized ward with the city centre and Deepdale at one side, Fishwick to the south, and Ribbleton to the east. Preston Prison is at the south-west of the ward, which is otherwise populated by terraced housing and shopping units and warehouses. A number of Preston Bus and Stagecoach services run across the ward towards Ribbleton, Longridge and beyond.

== Current members ==
Election	Member	Party
2007 Preston Council election	Javed Iqbal	Labour Party
2008 Preston Council election	Veronica Afrin	Labour Party
2014 Preston City Council election	Roy Leeming	Labour Party

== Demographics ==
From the 2001 census, St George's ward had a population of 5,049. Of this figure, 26.7% described themselves as Muslim.

== See also ==
- Preston local elections
