= College (Preston ward) =

Coordinates: 53.781°N 2.703°W

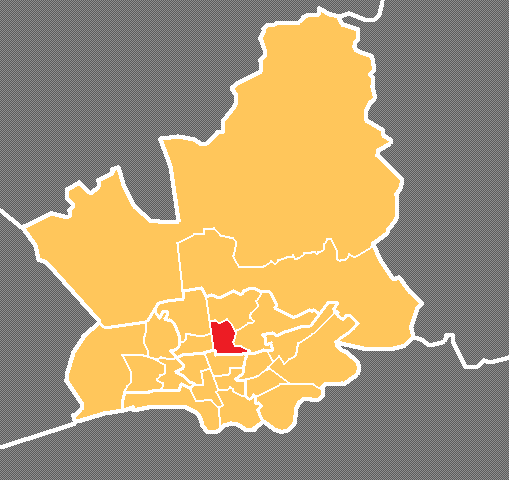
- Location in the City of Preston district

- Location in Preston Location within Lancashire
- Population: 3,578 (2011)
- District: City of Preston
- Ceremonial county: Lancashire
- Region: North West
- Country: England
- Sovereign state: United Kingdom
- UK Parliament: Wyre and Preston North
- Councillors: Bobby Cartwright – Conservative; Jill Truby – Conservative

College is an electoral ward and one of the districts of Preston. The population of the Ward as taken at the 2011 census was 3,578. College is in the Fulwood area in northern Preston, Lancashire, England. The ward is based in the Sharoe Green area with the name being derived from the central placement of Preston College.

The ward was split between the parliamentary constituencies of Ribble Valley and Preston. Following boundary changes in 2010, College became part of the new Wyre and Preston North constituency.

Two members of Preston City Council, elected 'in thirds' in first past the post elections each year, are returned from the ward.

The ward forms part of the Lancashire County Council electoral division of Preston Central North.

== Current members ==
Election	Member	Party
2007 Preston Council election	Jill Truby	Conservative
2010 Preston Council election	Bobby Cartwright	Conservative

== Demographics ==
From the 2001 census, College had a population of 3,517 of which nearly 79% classed themselves as Christian.

== Geography ==
College ward is an L-shaped ward in the northern suburban fringes of the city of Preston. It has the B6242 Watling Street Road in its southern base bordering Moor Park. This is the traditional border between the former separate Preston and Fulwood districts. The A6 Garstang Road is its western border, whilst to the east and north are suburban and private housing.

== See also ==
- Preston local elections
