= PR postcode area =

Postcode area within the United Kingdom

Preston
- Postcode area
- Coordinates: 53.723°N 2.756°W
- Country: United Kingdom
- Postcode area: PR
- Postcode area name: Preston
- Post towns: 4
- Postcode districts: 13
- Postcode sectors: 83
- Postcodes (live): 13,061
- Postcodes (total): 19,936
- Statistics as at May 2020

The PR postcode area, also known as the Preston postcode area, is a group of eleven postcode districts in North West England which together cover northern Merseyside and parts of central and southern Lancashire. Its four post towns are Chorley, Leyland, Southport, and Preston.

Mail for the PR postcode area is processed at Preston Mail Centre, along with mail for the BB, FY and LA postcode areas.

== Coverage ==
The approximate coverage of the postcode districts:

Postcode district	Post town	Coverage	Local authority area(s)
PR0	PRESTON	Express Gifts	non-geographic
PR1	PRESTON	City Centre, Avenham, Broadgate, Deepdale, Fishwick, St. Matthew's, Penwortham	City of Preston, South Ribble
PR2	PRESTON	Ashton On Ribble, Brookfield, Cadley, Fulwood, Grimsargh, Haighton, Ingol, Larches, Lea, Ribbleton, Riversway, Sharoe Green, Tanterton	City of Preston
PR3	PRESTON	Barnacre-with-Bonds, Barton, Bilsborrow, Bonds, Bowgreave, Broughton, Cabus, Calder Vale, Chipping, Claughton, Forton, Garstang, Goosnargh, Great Eccleston, Inglewhite, Little Eccleston, Longridge, Myerscough, Oakenclough, Pilling, Ribchester, St Michael's On Wyre, Scorton, Whittingham, Winmarleigh	Fylde, City of Preston, Ribble Valley, Wyre
PR4	PRESTON	Becconsall, Catforth, Clifton, Cottam, Eaves, Elswick, Freckleton, Hesketh Bank, Hutton, Inskip, Kirkham, Lea Town, Longton, Much Hoole, New Longton, Newton, Tarleton, Thistleton, Treales, Roseacre and Wharles, Walmer Bridge, Warton, Wesham, Woodplumpton, Wrea Green	Fylde, City of Preston, South Ribble, West Lancashire
PR5	PRESTON	Bamber Bridge, Coupe Green, Cuerdale, Cuerden, Gregson Lane, Higher Walton, Hoghton, Lostock Hall, Riley Green, Samlesbury, Walton-le-Dale, Walton Park, Walton Summit	South Ribble, Chorley
PR6	CHORLEY	Abbey Village, Adlington, Anderton, Anglezarke, Astley Village, Brindle, Brinscall, Clayton-le-Woods, Heapey, Heath Charnock, Wheelton, White Coppice, Whittle-le-Woods, Withnell	Chorley
PR7	CHORLEY	Adlington, Buckshaw Village, Charnock Richard, Coppull, Eccleston, Euxton, Heath Charnock, Heskin	Chorley
PR8	SOUTHPORT	Ainsdale, Birkdale, Blowick, Scarisbrick	Sefton, West Lancashire
PR9	SOUTHPORT	Banks, Churchtown, Crossens, Marshside	Sefton, West Lancashire
PR11	PRESTON	Great Universal Stores/Department for Work and Pensions delivering to its address in PR1	non-geographic
PR25	LEYLAND	Leyland, Clayton-le-Woods, Cuerden, Farington	South Ribble, Chorley
PR26	LEYLAND	Leyland, Bretherton, Croston, Farington Moss, Moss Side, Ulnes Walton	South Ribble, Chorley

The PR25 and PR26 districts were formed out of the PR5 district in January 2001. Leyland became a new post town at this time, having previously been part of the Preston post town.

== Map ==
PR postcode area map, showing postcode districts in red and post towns in grey text, with links to nearby BB, BL, FY, L, LA and WN postcode areas.

== See also ==
- Postcode Address File
- List of postcode areas in the United Kingdom
