= Wyre and Preston North =

UK Parliament constituency (2010–2024)

Coordinates: 53.903°N 2.772°W

- Former county constituency for the House of Commons
- Boundary of Wyre and Preston North in Lancashire

- Location of Lancashire within England
- County: Lancashire
- Electorate: 71,612 (December 2010)
- Major settlements: Thornton, Poulton-le-Fylde, Garstang, St Michael's On Wyre, Catterall, Fulwood

2010–2024
- Seats: One
- Created from: Ribble Valley, Lancaster and Wyre
- Replaced by: Blackpool North and Fleetwood, Lancaster and Wyre

Wyre and Preston North was a county constituency represented in the House of Commons of the Parliament of the United Kingdom. Created in 2010, it elected one Member of Parliament (MP) by the first past the post voting system.

It was formed from parts of the Ribble Valley, Fylde, and Lancaster and Wyre constituencies.

Further to the completion of the 2023 Periodic Review of Westminster constituencies, the seat was abolished. Subject to moderate boundary changes, with its area being split between five other constituencies, to be first contested at the 2024 general election.

The seat's only MP was Ben Wallace of the Conservative Party, former Secretary of State for Defence. He announced in 2023 that he would not seek re-election at the 2024 general election.

== Boundaries ==
Map of boundaries 2010-2024

Wyre and Preston North was created as the sixteenth seat of the county of Lancashire by the Boundary Commission for England prior to the 2010 general election. It contained the Fulwood and rural areas of Preston and many small towns and villages of Wyre.

The seat contained the Wyre towns of Poulton-le-Fylde, Garstang, St Michael's On Wyre, Catterall and parts of Thornton. From Preston are added the suburban Fulwood area and the rural parishes such as Woodplumpton, Barton, Broughton, Goosnargh and Grimsargh. The electoral wards used in the creation are:

- From Preston: Cadley, College, Garrison, Greyfriars, Preston Rural East, Preston Rural North, Sharoe Green
- From Wyre: Breck, Brock, Cabus, Calder, Carleton, Catterall, Garstang, Great Eccleston, Hambleton and Stalmine-with-Staynall, Hardhorn, High Cross, Norcross, Staina, Tithebarn.

=== Abolition ===
Further to the completion of the 2023 Periodic Review of Westminster constituencies, the seat was abolished prior to the 2024 general election, with parts distributed between five neighbouring constituencies:

- Garstang and surrounding rural areas to Lancaster and Fleetwood (to be renamed Lancaster and Wyre)
- The area comprising parts of the community of Thornton to Blackpool North and Cleveleys (to be renamed Blackpool North and Fleetwood)
- Poulton-le-Fylde to the constituency of Fylde
- Rural areas to the north of Preston and central areas of Fulwood to Ribble Valley
- Outer areas of Fulwood to Preston

== Members of Parliament ==
| Election | Member | Party |
|---|---|---|
| 2010 | Ben Wallace | Conservative |

== Elections ==
=== Elections in the 2010s ===
General election 2019: Wyre and Preston North
| Party | Candidate | Votes | % | ±% |
|---|---|---|---|---|
| Conservative | Ben Wallace | 31,589 | 59.7 | +1.4 |
| Labour | Joanne Ainscough | 14,808 | 28.0 | ―7.0 |
| Liberal Democrats | John Potter | 4,463 | 8.4 | +3.6 |
| Green | Ruth Norbury | 1,729 | 3.3 | +1.5 |
| Independent | David Ragozzino | 335 | 0.6 | New |
| Majority | | 16,781 | 31.7 | +8.4 |
| Turnout | | 52,924 | 70.4 | ―2.4 |
| Conservative hold | | Swing | +4.2 | |

General election 2017: Wyre and Preston North
| Party | Candidate | Votes | % | ±% |
|---|---|---|---|---|
| Conservative | Ben Wallace | 30,684 | 58.3 | +5.1 |
| Labour | Michelle Heaton-Bentley | 18,438 | 35.0 | +10.2 |
| Liberal Democrats | John Potter | 2,551 | 4.8 | ―0.6 |
| Green | Ruth Norbury | 973 | 1.8 | ―1.6 |
| Majority | | 12,246 | 23.3 | ―5.1 |
| Turnout | | 52,646 | 72.8 | +2.2 |
| Conservative hold | | Swing | | |

General election 2015: Wyre and Preston North
| Party | Candidate | Votes | % | ±% |
|---|---|---|---|---|
| Conservative | Ben Wallace | 26,528 | 53.2 | +0.8 |
| Labour | Ben Whittingham | 12,377 | 24.8 | +3.5 |
| UKIP | Kate Walsh | 6,577 | 13.2 | +8.4 |
| Liberal Democrats | John Potter | 2,712 | 5.4 | ―16.1 |
| Green | Anne Power | 1,699 | 3.4 | New |
| Majority | | 14,151 | 28.4 | ―2.5 |
| Turnout | | 49,893 | 70.6 | ―1.5 |
| Conservative hold | | Swing | | |

General election 2010: Wyre and Preston North
| Party | Candidate | Votes | % | ±% |
|---|---|---|---|---|
| Conservative | Ben Wallace | 26,877 | 52.4 | +10.4 |
| Liberal Democrats | Danny Gallagher | 11,033 | 21.5 | +5.4 |
| Labour | Cat Smith | 10,932 | 21.3 | ―5.9 |
| UKIP | Nigel Cecil | 2,466 | 4.8 | +2.7 |
| Majority | | 15,844 | 30.9 | |
| Turnout | | 51,308 | 72.1 | +8.8 |
| Conservative win (new seat) | | | | |

== See also ==
- List of parliamentary constituencies in Lancashire
