= 2004 Preston City Council election =

2004 UK local government election

Map of the results of the 2004 Preston council election. Labour in red, Conservatives in blue, Liberal Democrats in yellow and independent in light grey. Wards in dark grey were not contested in 2004.

This article shows the results of local elections for Preston City Council, in Lancashire held on 10 June 2004

Preston Council is elected "in thirds" which means there is an all out election in one year followed by single-member elections in subsequent years in which one councillor from each of the three-member wards and one councillor from selected two-member wards defend their seat. In these elections in 2004 the share of the vote is compared with the 2003 elections, whilst any gain or loss of a seat is compared with the all out 2002 elections.

Those councillors elected in 2004 will defend their seats in 2008.

Labour won 7 wards, with a total of 10,445 votes (28% across the city), the Conservatives 7 wins, with 14,754 votes in total, 39% across the city. The Liberal Democrats won 3 wards, gaining 9,181 (24%) votes across the city, whilst an independent won one seat. Candidates from Respect, and the England First party, failed to win seats in 2004.

In an Election Commission trial this was an "all postal" vote.

Preston City Council Elections: Ashton Ward 2004
Party	Candidate	Votes	%	±%
Conservative	Keith Sedgewick	612	41.9	−12.4
Labour	Mark Routledge	561	38.4	−7.2
Liberal Democrats	George Nash	289	19.8	N/A
Majority		51		
Turnout		1,481	43.0	+10.0

Preston City Council Elections: Brookfield ward 2004
Party	Candidate	Votes	%	±%
Labour	Jonathan Harish Saksena	815	41.1	−12.6
Conservative	David Johnston	550	27.7	−18.6
England First	Lee Worthington	368	18.5	N/A
Liberal Democrats	Peter Newsham	252	12.7	N/A
Majority		265		
Turnout		1,998	37	+15

Preston City Council Elections: Cadley ward 2004
Party	Candidate	Votes	%	±%
Liberal Democrats	Michael Onyon	1,084	52.1	
Conservative	David Hammond	755	36.3	
Labour	Ian Walton	252	11.6	
Majority		329		
Turnout		2,096	54	

Preston City Council Elections: Deepdale ward 2004
Party	Candidate	Votes	%	±%
Independent (politician)	Terry Cartright	921	46.1	N/A
Liberal Democrats	Samir Vohra	700	35.0	N/A
Labour	Marcus Quick	220	11.0	−11.8
Conservative	Robert Cartright	157	7.9	−4.4
Majority		221		
Turnout		2,026	52	+16

Preston City Council Elections: Fishwick ward 2004
Party	Candidate	Votes	%	±%
Conservative	Sharon Riley	517	37.9	
Labour	Ismail Patel	476	34.9	
Respect	Sabiha Vorajee	370	27.1	
Majority		41		
Turnout		1,388	38	
Conservative gain from Labour		Swing		

Preston City Council Elections: Garrison ward 2004
Party	Candidate	Votes	%	±%
Conservative	Stuart Greenhalgh	1,227	53.5	−9.4
Liberal Democrats	Gregory Vickers	577	25.2	+6.7
Labour	Paul Jackson	489	21.3	+2.8
Majority		650		
Turnout		2,314	45	

Preston City Council Elections: Greyfriars ward 2004
Party	Candidate	Votes	%	±%
Conservative	Geoffery Driver	1,939	62.6	
Liberal Democrats	John Porter	797	25.9	
Labour	Alan Woods	343	11.1	
Majority		1,142		
Turnout		3,097	58	

Preston City Council Elections: Ingol ward 2004
Party	Candidate	Votes	%	±%
Liberal Democrats	June Dodd	1,057	47.7	
Conservative	Mary Robinson	677	30.6	
Labour	Marcus Johnston	481	21.7	
Majority		380	39	
Turnout		2,251		

Preston City Council Elections: Larches ward 2004
Party	Candidate	Votes	%	±%
Liberal Democrats	Danny Gallagher	902	41.1	
Labour	Allan Foster	765	34.9	
Conservative	Susan Hudson	526	24.0	
Majority		137		
Turnout		2,222	40	

Preston City Council Elections: Lea ward 2004
Party	Candidate	Votes	%	±%
Liberal Democrats	Norman Abram	1,084	53.0	
Conservative	Sheila Hays	685	33.0	
Labour	Marie Johnson	285	13.9	
Majority		409		
Turnout		2,063	49	

Preston City Council Elections: Preston Rural East ward 2004
Party	Candidate	Votes	%	±%
Conservative	Thomas Davies	1,152	67.8	
Liberal Democrats	David Elvis Leeming	324	19.1	
Labour	Jennifer Mein	223	13.1	
Majority		828		
Turnout		1,711	55	

Preston City Council Elections: Preston Rural North ward 2004
Party	Candidate	Votes	%	±%
Conservative	Anthony Gornall	2,092	75.3	
Liberal Democrats	Raymond Sudlow	424	15.3	
Labour	Pauline Jackson	261	9.4	
Majority		1,668		
Turnout		2,801	52	

Preston City Council Elections: Ribbleton ward 2004
Party	Candidate	Votes	%	±%
Labour	Nicholas Pomfret	1,017	59.3	
Conservative	Paul Balshaw	386	22.5	
Liberal Democrats	Alastair Thomas	313	18.2	
Majority		631		
Turnout		1,741	31	

Preston City Council Elections: Riversway ward 2004
Party	Candidate	Votes	%	±%
Labour	Jack Davenport	600	34.8	
Respect	Elaine Abbot	415	24.0	
Liberal Democrats	Mark Jewell	394	22.8	
Conservative	Anne-Marie Hunter	317	18.4	
Majority		185		
Turnout		1,753	36	

Preston City Council Elections: Sharoe Green ward 2004
Party	Candidate	Votes	%	±%
Conservative	Geoffrey Thompson	1,311	52.6	
Liberal Democrats	Richard Hopkin	672	27.0	
Labour	Terrence Mattinson	508	20.4	
Majority		639		
Turnout		2,518	49	

Preston City Council Elections: St George's ward 2004
Party	Candidate	Votes	%	±%
Labour	Younus Khan	477	45.1	
Conservative	Gulam Hussain Mulla	292	27.6	
Respect	David Eaton	289	27.3	
Majority		185		
Turnout		1,058	33	

Preston City Council Elections: St Matthew's ward 2004
Party	Candidate	Votes	%	±%
Labour	Veronica Afrin	786	45.2	
Respect	Sumera Rizwan	587	33.8	
Conservative	Ronald Smith	365	21.0	
Majority		199		
Turnout		1,774	36	

Preston City Council Elections: Town Centre Ward 2004
Party	Candidate	Votes	%	±%
Labour	Kenneth Cole	904	39.9	
Respect	Mukhtar Master	762	33.6	
Liberal Democrats	Liam Pennington	312	13.8	
Conservative	Andrew Dowellian	261	11.5	
Majority		142		
Turnout		2,267	43.0	

Preston City Council Elections: Tulketh ward 2004
Party	Candidate	Votes	%	±%
Labour	Matthew Brown	982	51.3	
Conservative	Margaret McManus	933	48.7	
Majority		49		
Turnout		1,966	36	

== See also ==
- Preston local elections
- Preston (UK Parliament constituency)
- Fulwood, Lancashire
- 2006 United Kingdom local elections
