= Amounderness Hundred =

Subdivision of the historic county of Lancashire, England

Coordinates: 53.86°N 2.78°W

Hundred of Amounderness
- Lancashire Hundred

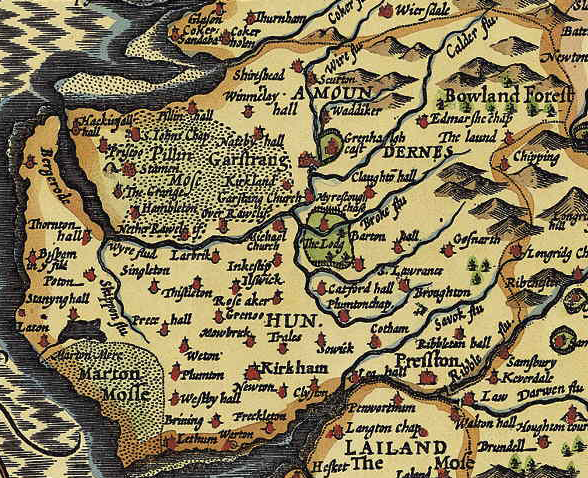
- Amounderness Hundred depicted in John Speed's 1610 map of Lancashire
- History
  - Created: In antiquity
- Subdivisions
  - Type: Parish(es)
  - Units: Preston • Kirkham • Lytham • Poulton-Le-Fylde • Bispham • St Michael-On-Wyre • Garstang

The Amounderness Hundred (/əˈmʌndərnəs/ ə-MUN-dər-nəs) was one of the six subdivisions of the historic county of Lancashire in North West England. The name is older than the system of hundreds first recorded in the 13th century and might best be described as the name of a Norse wapentake. In the Domesday Book of 1086, it was used for some territories north of the River Ribble included together with parts of Yorkshire. The area eventually became part of Lancashire, sitting geographically between the Rivers Lune and Ribble, in the strip of coast between the Irish Sea and Bowland Forest.

== Toponymy and history ==
Hundreds of Lancashire

In the 19th century, the name was considered to have been first recorded in 705, as Hacmunderness. The Domesday Book in 1086 spells it Agemundrenessa.

There are two suggested etymologies for Amounderness. The traditional 19th-century reading was that the name derived from ac (oak) and mund (protection), "a ness or promontory sheltered by oaks". This was given currency by Porter.

The current view is that the area is named after Agmundr, a Norse warlord, vassal of Eowils, Halfdan and Ingwaer, co-kings of Jorvik, all four of whom died at the Battle of Tettenhall near Wednesfield and Wolverhampton in August 910; Partington's early 20th-century description of "Amounder ... the first Viking who settled in the Fylde country" now being considered more fanciful than historically accurate. It was usual for the name of hundreds to refer to a "moot-stow" or meeting place and the element "-ness" (ON, promontory) suggests the Over-Wyre as one distinct possibility. There is some evidence to suggest the line of the Wyre/Calder rivers may have marked a north–south sub-division of the hundred in the early 10th century.

In The Place-names of Lancashire, Eilert Ekwall supports an early 10th-century coinage citing A[g]hemundesnes and the late 11th-century Agmundrenesse. The etymology of Agmundr is Old West Scandinavian agi- ("awe, terror") or possibly the German *ag- ("point, weapon point"), with -mundr, from Old West Scandinavian *-munduR ("protection"). The name appears in Old Swedish as Aghmund and in Old West Norse as Ogmundr. While the formal title of the warrior was almost certainly Agmundrholdr, his familiar or lall-name would have been Mundi.

Victorian commentators, such as Porter, often cited a 7th-century grant made at Ripon by Ecgfrith of Northumbria and Æthelwine as proof that Amounderness existed before the 10th century. In fact, the grant itself has not survived, its only source being an early 8th-century hagiography of the Northumbrian bishop Wilfrid – Vita Sancti Wilfrithi – by Stephen of Ripon (also known was Eddius Stephanus). There is no reference to Amounderness in this text, merely to lands "iuxta Rippel" (next to the Ribble). The historical misattribution may be due to the 16th-century antiquarian John Leland who cites Hasmundesham (possibly Amounderness) in his Collectanea, originally published in 1632, but does so without proper supporting evidence.

Amounderness was granted to Wulfstan I, Archbishop of York in June 934 by Æthelstan, King of England. Once thought a spoil of battle, the area had in fact been purchased by Aethelstan in 926. According to the grant, the extent of Amounderness was much greater than its present-day counterpart being the land "from the sea along the Cocker to the source of that river, from that source straight to another spring which is called in Saxon, Dunshop, thus down the riverlet to the Hodder, in the same direction to the Ribble and thus along that river through the middle of the channel to the sea". It is unclear from this description whether Dunshop refers to the westerly tributary of the river (i.e. the Brennand) or the easterly (i.e.. the Whitendale) but this distinction would have significant territorial implications.

Less precisely, Ekwall describes the eastern boundary of Amounderness as "being formed by the fells on the Yorkshire border". This places the boundary within the modern-day Forest of Bowland where Dunsop Bridge sits close to the eastern mouth of the Trough of Bowland that straddles the traditional Lancashire-Yorkshire border. After the Norman conquest of England, this eastern portion of Amounderness became part of the Lordship of Bowland. However, Thorn argues that "it was only along the river Hodder on the western and south-western edges of the Forest of Bowland that the division between Amounderness and Craven corresponded in any way to the later boundary between Lancashire and Yorkshire". Indeed, he even suggests that Amounderness may have been a "subdivision of Craven" which he describes as "stretching from the Irish Sea over the Pennines to touch the Yorkshire wapentakes of Burghshire and 'Skyrack'" ... the area around the headwaters of the rivers Aire and Wharfe and upper Ribblesdale".

In the 10th century, Amounderness would have been strategically important in terms of the Dublin-York axis. Its strategic importance is mirrored on the east coast by Holderness in the East Riding of Yorkshire. By the 12th century, Amounderness and Bowland had become two distinct and separate Lordships, each centred on its own seigneurial, later royal forest.

== Geography ==
The hundred of Amounderness corresponds to today's administrative districts of Fylde, Wyre, Preston and part of Ribble Valley (north of the River Ribble and within the historic boundaries of Lancashire). It included Bispham, Blackpool, Broughton-in-Amounderness, Chipping, Cockerham, Garstang, Kirkham, Knott End-on-Sea, Mitton, Pilling, Preesall, Poulton-le-Fylde, Preston, and Ribchester.

The name is preserved in the present-day Amounderness Way, which is part of the A585 road that runs between Mains Lane in Thornton and Dock Street in Fleetwood.

== Amounderness in popular culture ==
In his 1858 novel Mervyn Clitheroe, William Harrison Ainsworth portrays the minor character of the Earl of Amounderness whose "sylvan domains ... at Dunton Park ... boasted much noble timber". Ainsworth's protagonist Mervyn Clitheroe shoots a buck "in the domains of Lord Amounderness."

== Amounderness registration district ==
Amounderness was also the name of a registration district for births, deaths and marriages from 1 April 1935 to 31 March 1974. Previously, since 1837, its parishes were part of Preston Registration District. It consisted of Preston Rural District, Fulwood Urban District and Longridge Urban District, covering an area surrounding (but excluding) Preston that was much smaller than the hundred, including areas south of the Ribble that were outside the hundred. It comprised the civil parishes of Barton, Broughton, Cuerdale, Farington, Fulwood, Goosnargh, Grimsargh, Haighton, Hutton, Lea, Little Hoole, Longton, Much Hoole, Penwortham, Samlesbury, Walton-le-Dale, Whittingham and Woodplumpton (all of which were transferred to Preston and South Ribble registration district in 1974), and Alston, Dilworth, Dutton, Hothersall and Ribchester (which were transferred to Ribble Valley registration district).
