= Christ Church, Fulwood =

Christ Church
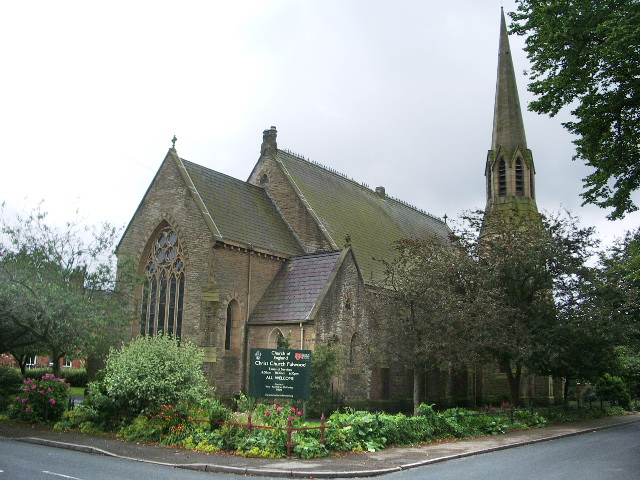

- Location in Preston
- 53.7772°N 2.7032°W
- OS grid reference: SD 53756 31435
- Location: Fulwood, Lancashire
- Country: England
- Denomination: Anglican
- Website: www.christchurchfulwood.org

History
- Status: Parish church

Architecture
- Functional status: Active
- Architect(s): Myres and Veevers
- Style: Gothic Revival
- Years built: 1854–55

Specifications
- Materials: Stone with polychromy in the dressings

Administration
- Diocese: Blackburn
- Archdeaconry: Lancaster
- Deanery: Preston

Christ Church is in Victoria Road, Fulwood, Preston, Lancashire, England. It is an active Anglican parish church in the deanery of Preston, the archdeaconry of Lancaster, and the diocese of Blackburn. The church was built in 1854–55 and designed by Myres and Veevers. It is constructed in stone with some polychromy in the dressings. The north steeple has a square porch at the base, and becomes octagonal as it rises. There are no aisles, and inside the church is a hammerbeam roof. In 1937 the Lancaster practice of Austin and Paley added a Chapel of Remembrance.

== See also ==
- List of ecclesiastical works by Austin and Paley (1916–44)
