= Corpus Christi Catholic High School, Fulwood =

Corpus Christi Catholic High School

Location
- St Vincent's Road; Fulwood; City of Preston, Lancashire, PR2 8QY; England
- Coordinates: 53.78554°N 2.70720°W

Information
- Type: Voluntary aided school
- Motto: Unum In Corpore Uno (Together In One Body)
- Religious affiliation: Roman Catholic
- Established: 1955
- Local authority: Lancashire
- Department for Education URN: 119780 Tables
- Headteacher: John Hankin
- Gender: Coeducational
- Age: 11 to 16
- Enrolment: 745 as of December 2022
- Website: http://www.ccc.lancs.sch.uk/

Corpus Christi Catholic High School is a coeducational secondary school located in Fulwood (near Preston) in the English county of Lancashire.

It is a voluntary aided school administered by Lancashire County Council and the Roman Catholic Diocese of Lancaster. The school offers GCSEs, BTECs and vocational courses as programmes of study for pupils.

The Jack McLaughlin Engineering Centre is located at the front of the school grounds. It is a study centre for engineering and auto-engineering, with pupils from Corpus Christi and other local schools able to attend.
