= Gordon Ashcroft =

English footballer

Personal information
- Date of birth: 7 September 1902
- Place of birth: Lea, England
- Date of death: 1982 (aged 80)
- Place of death: Chorley, Lancashire, England
- Position: Goalkeeper

Senior career*
Years	Team	Apps	(Gls)
19??–1925	Coppull Central	?	(?)
1925–1927	Burnley	1	(0)
1927–19??	Burscough Rangers	?	(?)
19??–1930	Lancaster Town	?	(?)
- * Club domestic league appearances and goals

Gordon Aschroft (7 September 1902 – 1982) was an English professional footballer who played as a goalkeeper. Born in Lea, Lancashire, he played for Coppull Central before joining Football League First Division side Burnley in November 1925. He made his debut for the club on 7 December 1925 in the 3–1 win against Birmingham at Turf Moor. Ashcroft failed to make another first-team appearance for Burnley and was released at the end of the 1926–27 season. In August 1927 he signed for Burscough Rangers, and then played for Lancaster Town.
