= Moor Park, Preston =

Park in Preston, Lancashire, England

Coordinates: 53.774°N 2.698°W

Moor Park
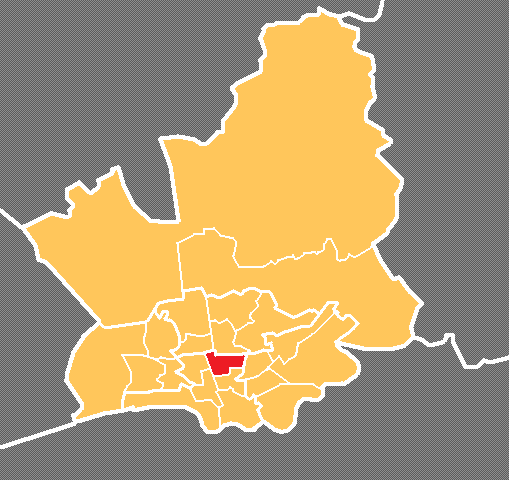
- Ward location in the City of Preston district

- Location in Preston Location within Lancashire
- Population: 5,211 (2011)
- District: City of Preston
- Ceremonial county: Lancashire
- Region: North West
- Country: England
- Sovereign state: United Kingdom
- UK Parliament: Preston
- Councillors: David Borrows – Labour; John Collins – Labour

Moor Park is a large park (with a perimeter of approx 2 miles (3 km)) to the north of the city centre of Preston, Lancashire, England. Moor Park is also the name of the electoral ward covering the park and the surrounding area. The ward borders the traditional boundary of Fulwood. The population of the ward as at the 2011 census was 5,211.

== Park ==
Moor Park lies to the north of Preston city centre on the A6 (Garstang Road), which forms the western boundary of the park. Blackpool Road between the A6 and Deepdale Road is the northern boundary. The latter forms the eastern side. Opposite the park on Deepdale Road is the Preston North End F.C.'s Deepdale stadium.

Moor Park is Preston's largest and oldest park. The park was originally a farm and was run by George Dartford from a famous house called the Barn. In her book People's Parks Conway claims that Moor Park was the first municipal park to be created in the newly emerging industrial towns of Britain.

Preston Moor was an area of land to the north on Preston. It was originally common land derived from the Royal Forest of Fulwood by the Charter of Henry III in 1235.

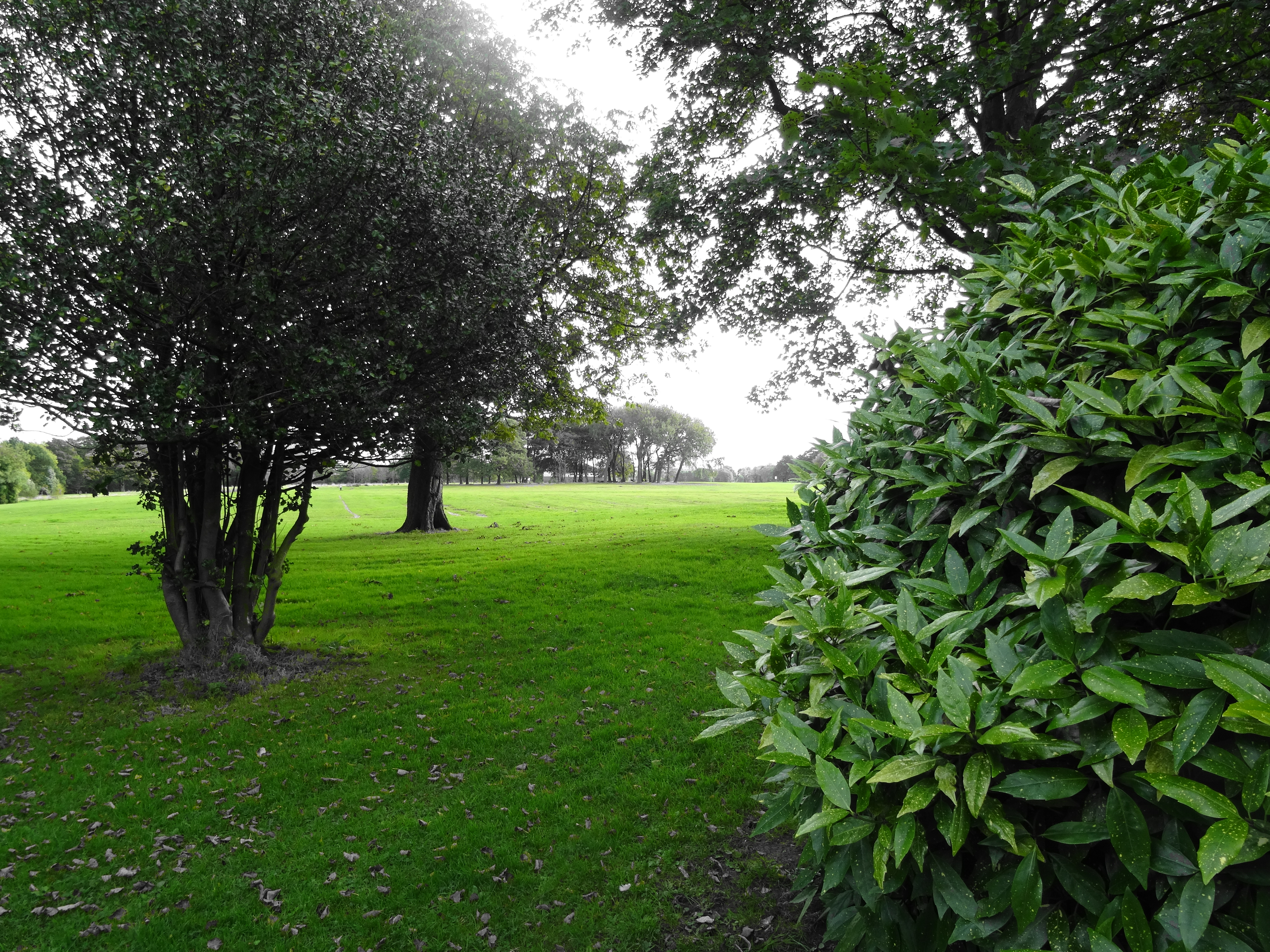
Moor Park Main field

In the 1830s it was felt by the town's council that Preston Moor was in a 'neglected and unprofitable condition'. In 1833 The Preston Chronicle published an article on 'The Intended Inclosure and Improvement of Preston Moor'. It showed a map of the intended enclosure. The plan was drawn up by the Town Steward, the appropriately named Philip Park.

In the mid-1860s the park was landscaped to a design by the landscape architect Edward Milner and was part of a scheme to provide work for those unemployed because of the Lancashire cotton famine. Edward Milner was a former student and assistant of Joseph Paxton, the noted Victorian architect and park designer. The work was supervised by George Rowbotham, who allegedly became the town's first Parks' Superintendent.

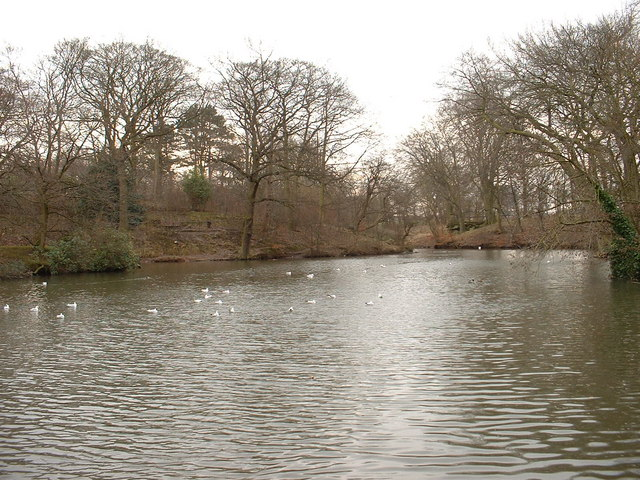
The Serpentine Lake

In 1927 an observatory, named the Jeremiah Horrocks Observatory, was built on the park to replace a building in Fulwood. The first curator was George James Gibbs, F.R.A.S. (1866-1947). Gibbs wrote a description of the observatory in 1941. The observatory is now run by the University of Central Lancashire, although light pollution and vibration from traffic on Blackpool Road means that it is no longer used for scientific research.

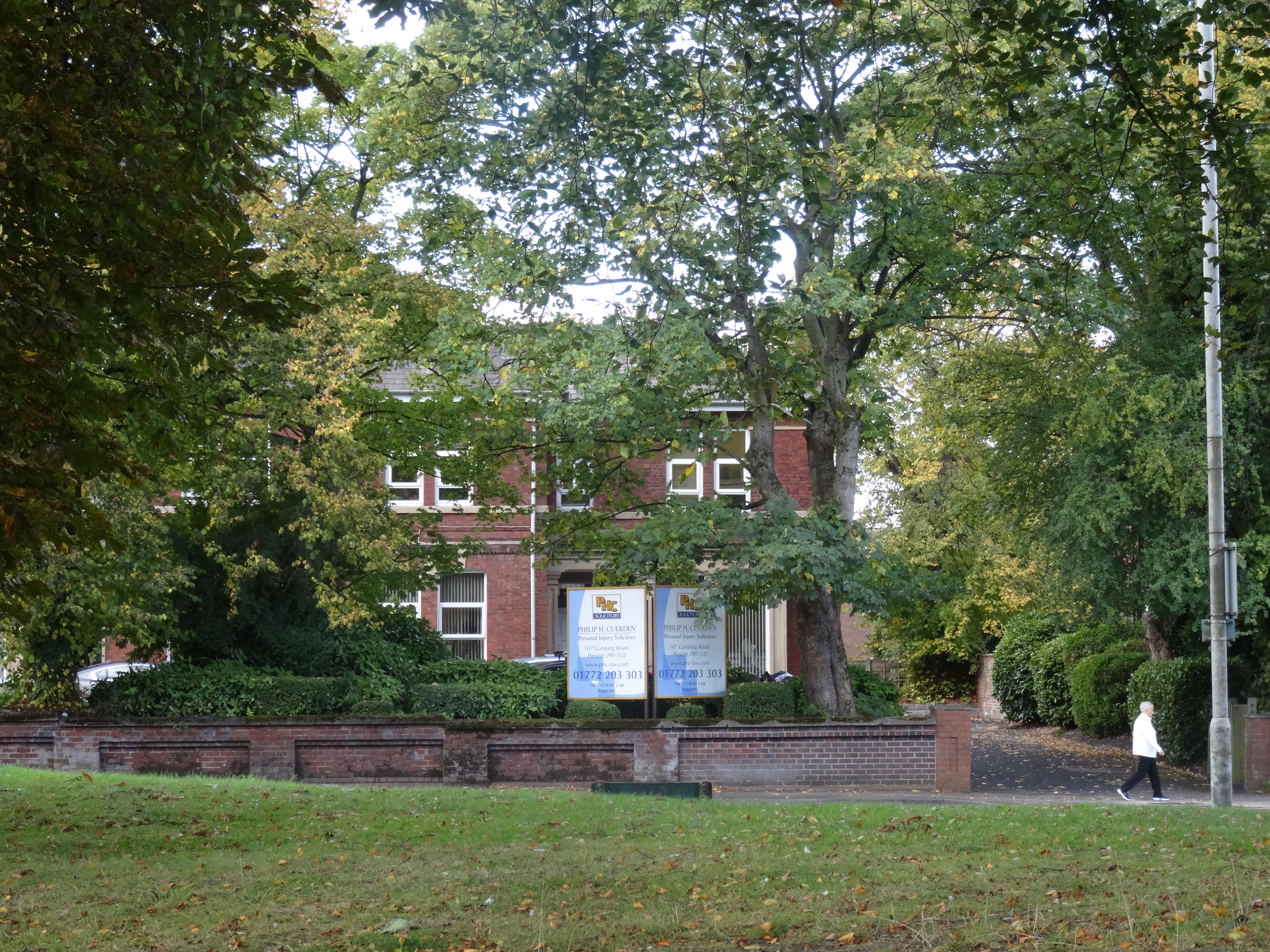
Garstang Road houses several commercial properties

On the Park's far west side facing Garstang Road, a number of central businesses overlook Moor Park. This area of Preston is highly desirable and fashionable. Most of the office buildings are Victorian architecture with open space and large car parks. Some businesses include PHC Law Ltd, Deepdale Vicarage, Lancashire Probation Service, Taxbak and St John Ambulance.

Moor Park Avenue, located along the park's southern side, features buildings with Victorian and Baroque architecture. In addition to residential properties, the avenue houses commercial and public businesses, including healthcare centres, accountants, dental practices, children's day care centres, hotels, and Moor Park High School and Sixth Form.

In August 2013, Moor Park was designated a Grade II* listed park.

It is host to several events throughout the year, especially during the Spring and Summer seasons. Some examples include 'S2S In The Park', and an outdoor cinema in 2017. In June 2024, the park was the location for Radio 2 in the Park 2024.

== Electoral ward ==
Moor Park is currently a two-member electoral ward, which in addition to the neighbouring College and Deepdale wards, forms the Preston Central North division of Lancashire County Council. The English Martyr's Catholic Church is within the ward.

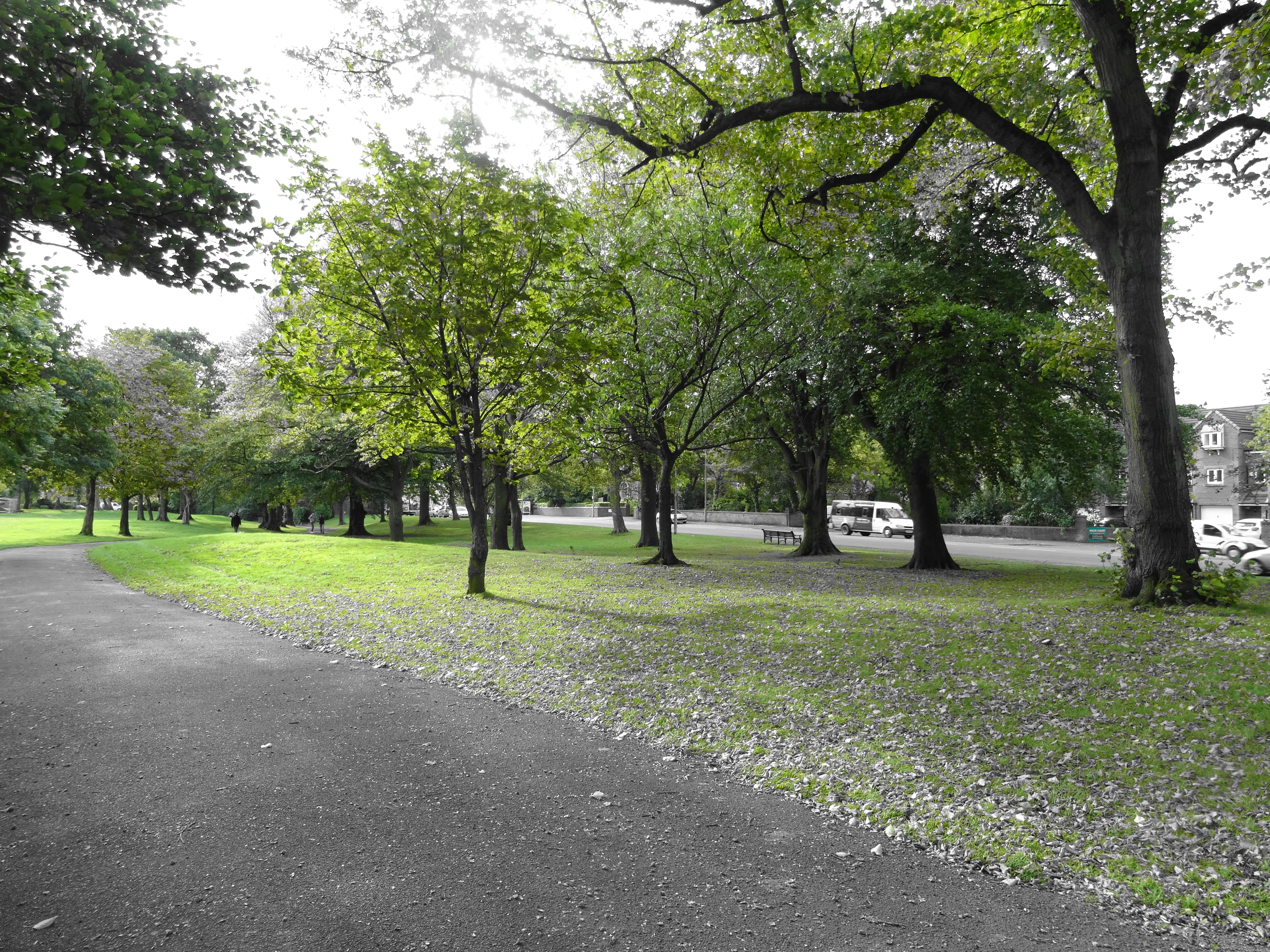
Moor Park, Garstang Road, Preston

=== Current councillors ===
Election	Member	Party
2011 Preston Council election	David Borrow	Labour Party
2010 Preston Council election	John Collins	Labour Party

=== Demographics ===
At the 2001 census, Moor Park has a population of 4,919, whilst at the most recent election the electorate was 3,053. Of this figure, 68% described themselves as Christian, with a Muslim population of 5.2%. Whilst the area around Fulwood is largely commuter belt and recent retired properties, the Plungington and Deepdale areas are traditional terraces with multi-occupancy homes increasingly common.

=== Geography ===
The traditional “grid” terraces in the south of the ward are made up of a number of main roads, including the A6 Garstang Road which itself runs from the ward's northern boundary at Lytham Road, to the outskirts of the city centre. The component of the electoral ward to the south of Moor Park itself crosses the A6 to take in a number of terraces to St Paul's Road in an easterly direction towards Deepdale. From the main Blackpool Road heading north, the houses are largely semi- and true detached homes in the suburban style.

== See also ==
- Preston local elections
- Districts of Preston

== Notes ==
[2] Open-air-bath for Preston - an interesting ceremony. Preston Guardian. 10 June 1905. p. 13.

[3] New sports pavilion at Moor Park. Preston Guardian. 28 May 1932. p. 6.
