= Preston Rural East =

Electoral ward in Lancashire, England

Coordinates: 53.80°N 2.64°W

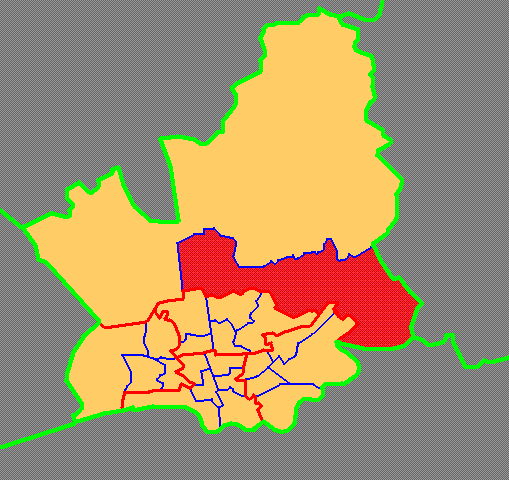
- Shown within City of Preston
- Population: 4,577 (2011)
- District: City of Preston
- Ceremonial county: Lancashire
- Country: England
- Sovereign state: United Kingdom
- UK Parliament: Ribble Valley
- Councillors: Neil Cartwright – Conservative; Thomas Davies – Conservative

Preston Rural East is an electoral ward in the City of Preston, Lancashire, England. The ward is in the eastern and northeastern part of the city near the M55 motorway moving out towards Sherwood and Grimsargh. The population of the ward at the 2011 census was 4,577.

== Parishes ==
Unlike many other districts of Preston, the ward of Preston Rural East is parished, in that it has within it parish councils with their own structure and elected councillors. The parishes within Preston Rural East are Grimsargh, Haighton, and Broughton-in-Amounderness.

== Current councillors ==
Election	Member	Party
2007 Preston Council election	Neil Cartwright	Conservative Party
2008 Preston Council election	Thomas Davies	Conservative Party

== Demographics ==
At the most recent census in 2001, the electoral ward of Preston Rural East had a population of 3,814. Over 88% described themselves as Christian. Many of the people living in the wards and parishes rely on farming and agriculture for their living. At the most recent elections, the 2008 Preston Council election, the electorate of the ward was 3,905. The ward forms, in conjunction with its neighbour Preston Rural North, the Lancashire County Council electoral division of Preston Rural.
