= Fernyhalgh Wood =

Woodland in Fulwood, Lancashire, England

- Location within Preston
- Location: Fulwood, Lancashire
- OS grid: SD553326
- Coordinates: 53°47′24″N 2°40′26″W
- Area: 4.58 hectares (11.32 acres)
- Owner: The Woodland Trust

Fernyhalgh Wood (/ˈfɜːrniəf/) is a woodland in Fulwood, Preston, Lancashire, England. It covers a total area of 4.58 hectares (11.32 acres). It is owned and managed by the Woodland Trust.
