= Deepdale, Preston =

Electoral ward in Preston, Lancashire, England

Coordinates: 53.773°N 2.683°W

Deepdale
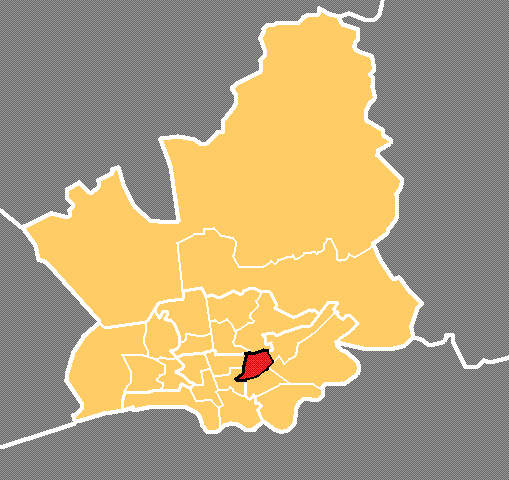
- Location in the City of Preston district

- Location in Preston Location within Lancashire
- Population: 6,103 (2011)
- District: City of Preston
- Ceremonial county: Lancashire
- Region: North West
- Country: England
- Sovereign state: United Kingdom
- Post town: PRESTON
- Postcode district: PR1
- Dialling code: 01772
- UK Parliament: Preston
- Councillors: Terry Cartwright – Independent; Joyce Cartwright – Independent

Deepdale is an electoral ward in Preston, Lancashire, England. The population of the ward as taken at the 2011 census was 6,103. The ward is home to the Deepdale football stadium of Preston North End. The ward is a predominantly urban area of terraced housing, notable for one of the largest South Asian populations in the city.

Deepdale borders Moor Park. The area has a number of mosques. The former Deepdale railway station was to be found in this ward.

Two members of Preston City Council, elected 'in thirds' in first past the post elections each year, are returned from the ward.

The ward forms part of the Lancashire County Council electoral division of Preston Central North.

== Current members ==
Election	Member	Party
2007 Preston Council election	Joyce Cartwright	Independent
2008 Preston Council election	Terry Cartwright	Independent

== Demographics ==
From the 2001 census, Deepdale ward had a population of 5,802. Of this figure, 44% described themselves as Muslim, and 38% as Christian.

In 2011, Deepdale had a population of 6103 people. Here is an ethnic breakdown of the ward.

Deepdale 2011 Statistics	Percentage	Amount Compared to total population of 6103
White British	32.4%	1983
White Other	4.3%	263
Asian	57.4%	3502
Black	1.3%	82

Indians make up around three quarters of Deepdale's Asian population. It also has large Eastern European and Pakistani populations.

== Geography ==
The ward is in the north-east of the city on the outskirts of the centre, largely following Deepdale Road from HMP Preston to Watling Street Road, then continuing through terraced and detached housing in an easterly direction. A number of Stagecoach in Preston services use the local roads through the area. Deepdale ward also includes Holme Slack estate and Deepdale Retail Park.

== See also ==
- Preston local elections
