= Greyfriars, Preston =

Coordinates: 53.787°N 2.730°W

Greyfriars
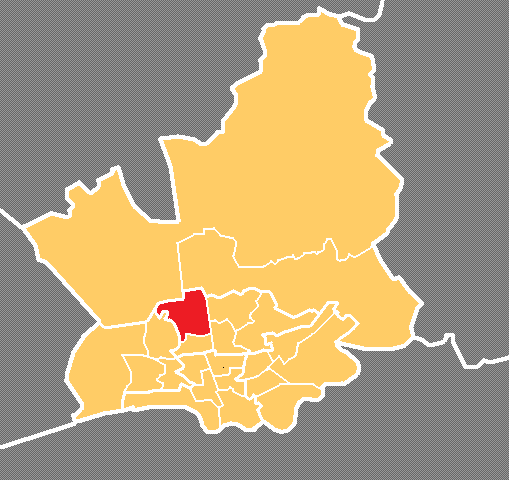
- Ward location within the City of Preston district

- Location in Preston Location within Lancashire
- Population: 6,404 (2011 Census)
- District: City of Preston
- Ceremonial county: Lancashire
- Region: North West
- Country: England
- Sovereign state: United Kingdom
- UK Parliament: Ribble Valley
- Councillors: Phoenix Adair – Liberal Democrats; Geoffrey Aldridge – Conservative; Tony Raisbeck – Liberal Democrats

Greyfriars is a largely residential suburban area of Preston, Lancashire, England, and an electoral ward. It is nowadays usually considered to be a district of the larger suburb of Fulwood (and formed part of the pre-1974 Fulwood Urban District), but was historically separate as evidenced, for instance, in the name of the private home from which the name is taken.

There are two golf courses within the ward, and a cricket club. The main A6 Garstang road forms its eastern boundary.

Greyfriars is a district of Preston positioned to the far north of the city centre near the M55 motorway interchange. The West Coast Main Line runs through the area, although its major transport links are served by the local and national bus routes criss-crossing its boundaries. The ward of Greyfriars is a three-member electoral division, returning three councillors to Town Hall. With the neighbouring Cadley ward, it forms the Preston North division of Lancashire County Council.

At the 2001 census, the population of Greyfriars was 4,698, with over 85% regarding themselves as Christian. At the 2008 local elections in Preston, Greyfriars had a valid electorate of 5,262. At the 2011 Census the population was 6,404.

== Current members ==
Election	Member	Party
Preston City Council, 2022	Fiona Duke	Liberal Democrats
Preston City Council, 2021	Geoffery Aldridge	Conservative Party
Preston City Council, 2019	Tony Raisbeck	Liberal Democrats

== See also ==
- Districts of Preston
- Fulwood, Lancashire
