= Avenham =

Area of Preston, Lancashire, England

Coordinates: 53°45′19″N 2°41′58″W

Town Centre ward
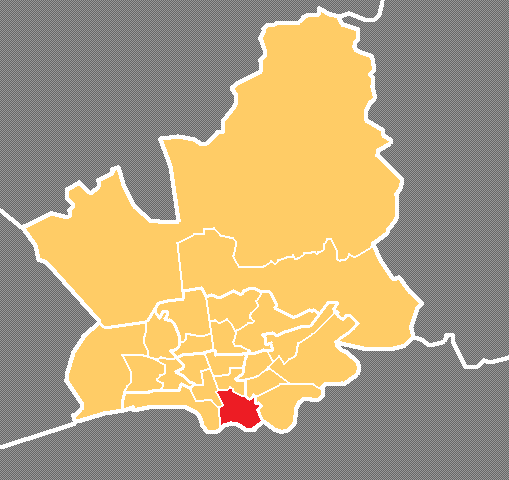
- Location in the City of Preston district

- Location in Preston Location within Lancashire
- Population: 6,671 (2001)
- District: Preston
- Ceremonial county: Lancashire
- Region: North West
- Country: England
- Sovereign state: United Kingdom
- UK Parliament: Preston
- Councillors: Drew Gale – Labour; Michael Lavalette – TUSC; Salim Desai – Labour

Avenham and Frenchwood are the central communities which make up the Town Centre ward of Preston City Council, in Lancashire, England. The name of the ward was chosen by the Boundary Committee for England prior to Preston being awarded city status.

In addition to Avenham and Frenchwood, Town Centre ward consists of the city centre itself, which includes numerous pubs, clubs, and new build housing. Landmarks such as the Harris Museum, and Preston Bus Station are also in this ward. Avenham and Frenchwood form part of the Lancashire County Council electoral division of Preston City, in addition to the Broadgate and docklands ward of Riversway.

== Demographics ==
Avenham is a varied and multi-cultural part of the city of Preston, with the most recent census recording a population of 6,671 for the whole Town Centre electoral ward, from which only just half (49.7%) recorded themselves as Christian, whilst 25.6% used the designation Muslim, a further 5.3% using Hindu. In recent years the increase of Eastern European immigration, in addition to students of University of Central Lancashire has made the Avenham area an increasingly varied area. The electoral ward of Town Centre goes as north as an estate of housing for elderly residents and the “Trinity Student Village”, a gated community for UCLaN students. At the 2008 Preston Council election the recorded electorate of Town Centre ward was 5,296

== Geography ==
Avenham has always been a populous community at the heart of Preston, be it the age of back-to-back terraced housing, or the current mix of multi-occupancy homes, new build flats, old style high-rises, and low income houses. Avenham contains some of Preston's oldest streets, as well as the shining new build which followed city status. The Town Centre ward has the River Ribble and Frenchwood at its southern base, moving through in a northerly direction through Avenham, the city centre, and to the borders of the UCLan campus.

== See also ==
- Preston local elections
- Districts of Preston
- Avenham Park
