= Central Lancashire =

Area of Lancashire, England

Coordinates: 53.710°N 2.643°W

Map highlighting the three districts of Preston, Chorley and South Ribble that form Central Lancashire planning area

Central Lancashire is an area of Lancashire, England.

Central Lancashire is a geographical and strategic planning area in Lancashire, England, centred on Preston and encompassing the local authority areas of Preston, Chorley and South Ribble. The three councils officially describe Central Lancashire as an integrated local economy, commuting area and housing market area.

The name has a long history of official use. Central Lancashire New Town was designated in 1970, covering Preston and surrounding areas, while since 2008 Preston, Chorley and South Ribble councils have jointly used Central Lancashire for strategic planning. The term was also used during the 2026 local government reorganisation process for one proposed unitary authority covering Chorley, Preston, South Ribble and West Lancashire.

== Central Lancashire New Town ==
Central Lancashire New Town was designated on 26 March 1970 under the New Towns Act 1965, with the designation coming into operation on 14 April 1970. It was the largest of the designated English new towns by land area.

The designated area covered approximately 35,225 acres (143 km^{2}), comprising the whole of the County Borough of Preston and parts of Chorley, Fulwood, Leyland, Walton-le-Dale, Chorley Rural District and Preston Rural District.

Unlike many post-war new towns, Central Lancashire was based around three substantial existing communities, Preston, Chorley and Leyland, rather than the creation of a single new settlement. The Royal Town Planning Institute has described the designation as unusual because the three communities retained their distinct identities, while joint strategic planning across the area continued after the New Town programme ended.

The Central Lancashire New Town Development Corporation was responsible for developing housing, employment land and infrastructure across the designated area. By 1979 it had built 2,189 houses and serviced land on which a further 1,080 homes had been built by private developers. Development included new communities at Clayton Brook, Moss Side, Astley Park and Cop Lane, as well as employment development including Walton Summit.

The Development Corporation also introduced shared ownership housing. During preparations for its dissolution, residents were consulted over whether its rented housing should be transferred to local authorities or housing associations, with a large majority favouring transfer to a housing association. In 1985, more than 3,500 homes were transferred to the North British Housing Association.

The corporation's remaining property was transferred to the Commission for the New Towns on 31 December 1985, and the corporation was formally dissolved on 31 March 1986.

== Central Lancashire planning area ==
Since 2008, Central Lancashire has been used as a joint strategic planning area covering the local authority areas of the City of Preston, the Borough of South Ribble and the Borough of Chorley. The three councils describe Central Lancashire as functioning as a single integrated local economy and commuting area, as well as a shared housing market area.

The councils began collaborating on a joint Local Development Framework in 2008, with a dedicated Core Strategy team based at Lancashire County Council. The Central Lancashire Core Strategy was adopted by all three councils in July 2012 and established the strategic planning framework for the area, supported by individual local plans adopted by the three authorities in 2015.

Strategic planning across the area is overseen by the Central Lancashire Strategic Planning Joint Advisory Committee, comprising members of Chorley, Preston and South Ribble councils. The committee considers the Central Lancashire Local Plan and strategic planning matters affecting the area as a whole.

A new Central Lancashire Local Plan 2023–2041 was submitted by the three councils to the Planning Inspectorate for examination on 30 June 2025. The plan remained under examination in 2026.

At the 2021 census, the three local authority areas had a combined population of 376,604, comprising 147,835 residents in Preston, 117,732 in Chorley and 111,035 in South Ribble.

== Preston Built-up Area ==
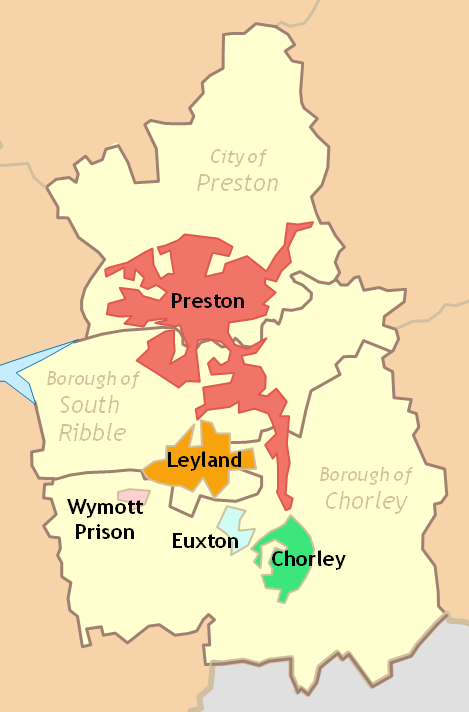
Preston Urban Area in 2001 within Central Lancashire

The Office for National Statistics gives the 2011 population of the Preston Built-up Area, covering Preston, Leyland, Chorley, Bamber Bridge, Fulwood, Hutton, Longton, Adlington, Grimsargh and Euxton, as 313,322. This area replaced the 2001 definition of Preston Urban Area which then had a population of 264,601.

== Local government reorganisation ==
During the 2026 consultation on local government reorganisation in Lancashire, one of the proposals submitted to the government used the name Central Lancashire for a proposed unitary authority comprising Chorley, Preston, South Ribble and West Lancashire. The proposal was submitted jointly by Blackburn with Darwen, Fylde, Hyndburn, Rossendale and Wyre councils.

The government ultimately selected a different four-authority configuration, under which Preston was included in the proposed North Lancashire authority while Chorley and South Ribble were included in the proposed South Lancashire authority.

== See also ==
- Sir Francis Pearson, former MP for Clitheroe, was Chairman of the Central Lancashire New Town Development Corporation from 1971.
