= Preston Rural North =

Electoral ward in Lancashire, England

Coordinates: 53.83°N 2.73°W

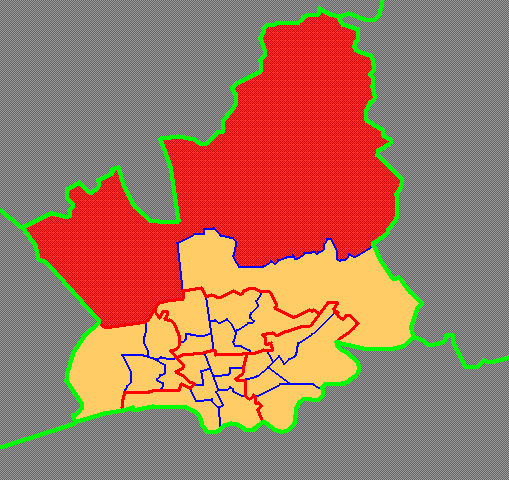
- Shown within City of Preston
- Population: 6,647 (2011)
- District: City of Preston
- Ceremonial county: Lancashire
- Country: England
- Sovereign state: United Kingdom
- UK Parliament: Ribble Valley
- Councillors: Charles Latchford – Conservative; Keith Middlebrough – Conservative; Sue Whittam – Conservative

Preston Rural North is an electoral ward in the City of Preston, Lancashire, England. The ward is the largest by area in the city, containing the smaller and smallest villages from the northern areas of Preston, from Woodplumpton bordering the M55 motorway junction at Broughton, to Beacon Fell at the border of the borough of Wyre.

== Parishes ==
Unlike many other districts of Preston, the ward of Preston Rural North is parished, in that it has within it parish councils with their own structure and elected councillors. The parishes within Preston Rural North are Woodplumpton, Barton, Whittingham, and Goosnargh.

== Current councillors ==
Election	Member	Party
2019 Preston Council election	Charles Latchford	Conservative Party
2019 Preston Council election	Keith Middlebrough	Conservative Party
2019 Preston Council election	Sue Whittam	Conservative Party

== Demographics ==
At the most recent census in 2001, the electoral ward of Preston Rural North had a population of 6,540, increasing to 6,647 at the 2011 Census. Over 80% described themselves as Christian. Many of the people living in the wards and parishes rely on farming and agriculture for their living. At the 2007 Preston Council election, the electorate of the ward was 5,305.

Preston Rural North contains the former Whittingham Hospital, now ear-marked for renewal as a residential community. The ward forms, in conjunction with its neighbour Preston Rural East, the Preston Rural electoral division of Lancashire County Council.
