= Ashton-on-Ribble =

Suburb of Preston, Lancashire, England

Coordinates: 53.765°N 2.729°W

Ashton
- Location in Preston Location within Lancashire
- Population: 8,700 (2021)
- District: City of Preston
- Ceremonial county: Lancashire
- Region: North West
- Country: England
- Sovereign state: United Kingdom
- Post town: PRESTON
- Postcode district: PR2
- Dialling code: 01772
- UK Parliament: Preston
- Councillors: Liz Atkins - Labour Robert Boswell - Labour James Hull - Labour

Ashton-on-Ribble is a suburb in the West of Preston, Lancashire, England. The population at the 2021 Census was 8,700. Ashton-on-Ribble was recorded in the Domesday Book.

Ashton-on-Ribble contains the historic Preston Docks, once the largest inland dock in Europe, the site is now largely residential living accommodation and leisure facilities. Ashton Park is within Ashton-on-Ribble, containing Ashton House, built in 1810 by Thomas Starkie Shuttleworth and later the home of Preston banker James Pedder.

== Demographics ==
The 2011 census records the ward's population at 4,459; in 2001 the recorded population was 4,430. At the 2007 Preston Council election the ward had a valid electorate of 3,104.

From the census results, 67.8% of the population considered themselves Christian.

== Geography ==
A ward in the western part of Preston, Ashton is largely suburban with large houses bordering the renewed Docklands area. Part of the ward is also made up of terraced housing, predominantly between Lane Ends shopping area and Ashton Park. The railway line from Preston railway station to Blackpool North railway station runs through the ward.

== People ==
The actor Kenny Baker was a resident of Ashton-on-Ribble.

The footballer Chris Ward was born in Ashton-on-Ribble.

The actress Maggie Ollerenshaw was born in Ashton-on-Ribble.

The historian AJP Taylor lived in Ashton-on Ribble from 1919 to 1929.

== See also ==
- Districts of Preston
- St Andrew's Church, Ashton-on-Ribble
- St Michael and All Angel's Church, Ashton-on-Ribble
