= Archbishop Temple School =

Archbishop Temple Church of England High School

Location
- St Vincent's Road; Preston, Lancashire, PR2 8RA; England; 53.7840°N 2.7020°W

Information
- Type: Voluntary aided school
- Motto: Faith, Nurture, Service
- Religious affiliation: Church of England
- Established: 1963
- Local authority: Lancashire
- Department for Education URN: 119814 Tables
- Ofsted: Reports
- Head teacher: Ivan Catlow
- Staff: around 40 teachers
- Age: 11 to 16
- Enrolment: 838 pupils as of november 2025
- Named after: William Temple
- Website: https://www.archbishoptemple.com/

Archbishop Temple Church of England High School is a voluntary aided Church of England secondary school, situated in the city of Preston in Lancashire, England. The Headteacher is Ivan Catlow. It has 782 pupils and 48 teachers.

== History ==
Archbishop Temple Church of England High School welcomed its first pupils in September 1963, as a secondary modern school serving the needs of inner city Preston. It was originally named "William Temple School", after Archbishop William Temple, Archbishop of Canterbury 1940–1944.

== Previous headteachers ==
- Mr Hattersley,
- Mr Dobson,
- Dr Shepherd,
- Dr Dennison,
- Mrs James,
- Mr Noble,
- Mr Hugill,
- Mrs Jackson.

== School motto ==
"May we shine God's Light through faith, nurture and service."

== School hymn ==
"Shine God's Light", Archbishop Temple Church of England High School's hymn, was written, composed and recorded in 2023.

== Specialist links ==
During the Grant Maintained years, and up until 2011 the school enjoyed specialist college status, and had especially strong links with BAe systems and the Garfield Weston foundation. Students were incredibly successful in national technology competitions. In 2009, the school successfully bid to become a dual status school, with the added specialism of Humanities. In its heyday, the school was the highest achieving school in the North of England, as well as a school that through its Headteacher National Leader and support status worked with many schools facing difficulties helping them to turn around. In 2009 the school was accepted into the Woodard foundation – a prestigious group of both state and public schools.

== Academic performance and inspections ==
The school's exam results are consistently among the best in the country. In 2023, 87% of pupils achieved five good GCSE exams, including English and Maths.

Ofsted rated the school as Outstanding in 2009. The most recent inspection in 28 January 2025 rates the school as good.

== See also ==
- Listed buildings in Preston, Lancashire
