= Ingol =

Coordinates: 53.7866°N 2.746°W

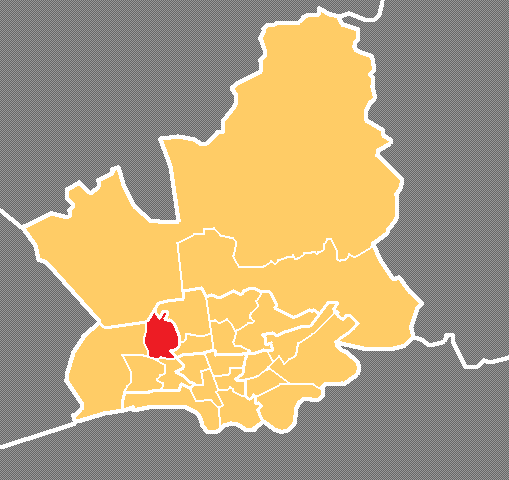
- Location in the City of Preston district

- Location in the City of Preston district Location within Lancashire
- Population: 7,369 (2011)
- District: City of Preston
- Ceremonial county: Lancashire
- Region: North West
- Country: England
- Sovereign state: United Kingdom
- UK Parliament: Preston
- Councillors: Pauline Brown – Liberal Democrat; Neil Darby – Liberal Democrat; Jason Jeffrey – Liberal Democrat

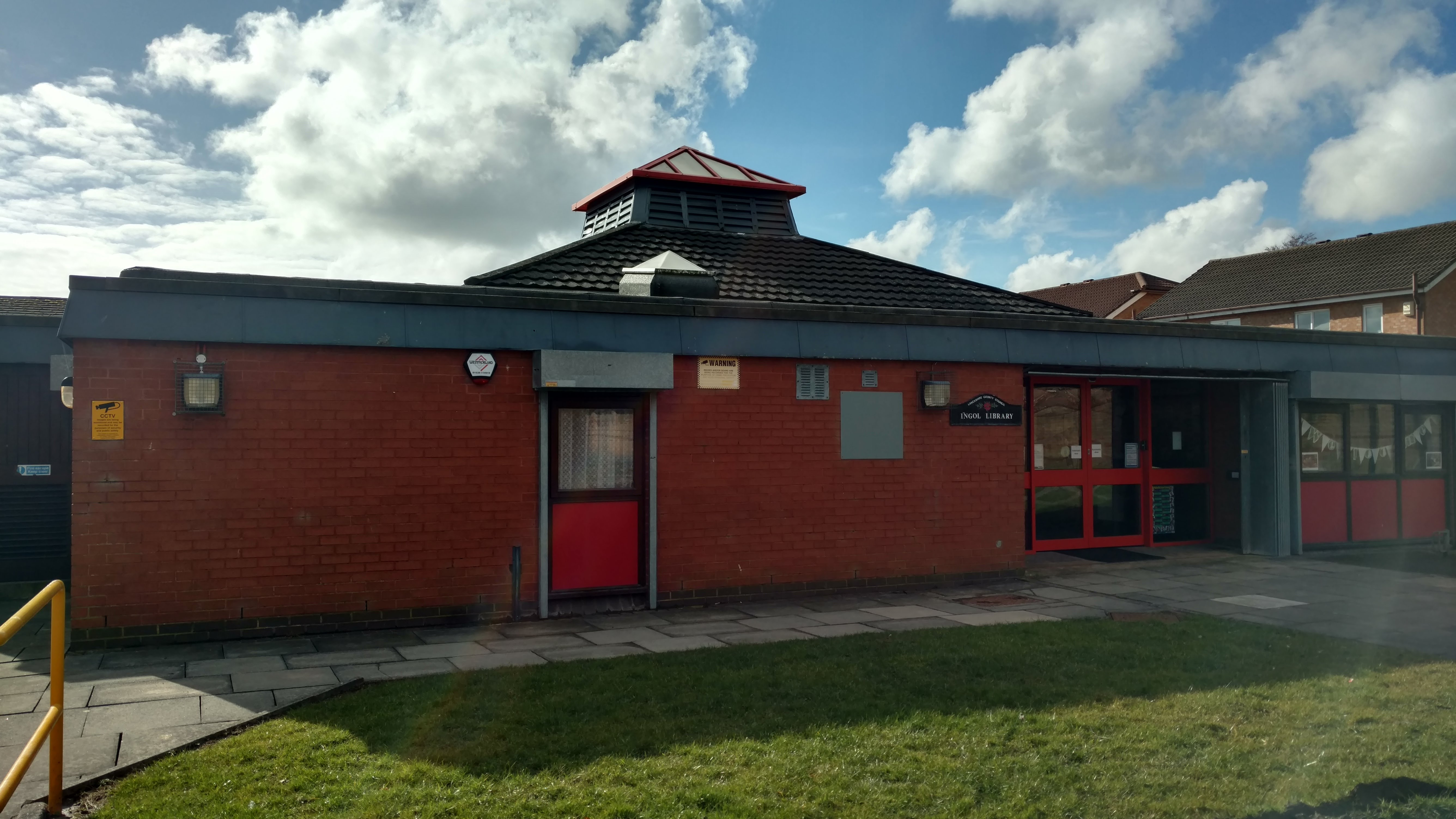
Ingol's public library, operated by Lancashire County Council.

Ingol is an electoral ward and suburb of Preston, Lancashire, England. The population of the Ward as taken at the 2011 census was 7,369. The ward also includes the district of Tanterton. The ward is coterminous with the civil parish of Ingol and Tanterton, created in 2012.

With a golf course within its boundaries and continued new housing development, the area is suburban in its northern and central areas with a more significant low income housing area in its eastern part. Ingol and Tanterton straddle the historic boundary between the former County Borough of Preston and Fulwood Urban District.

Ingol has running through it the main Woodplumpton Road running from Preston's Lane Ends shopping community to the villages in the parish of Woodplumpton and the borough of Wyre. It is served by a library, a community centre several churches and shops. The citywide orbital service provided by Preston Bus cuts through both suburban and new-build areas of the Ingol area.

Three members of Preston City Council, elected 'in thirds' in first past the post elections each year, are returned from the ward. The ward forms part of the Lancashire County Council electoral division of Preston West.

== Current members ==
Election	Member	Party
2014 Preston City Council election	Neil Darby	Liberal Democrat
2015 Preston City Council election	Jason Jeffrey	Liberal Democrat
2016 Preston City Council election	Pauline Brown	Liberal Democrat

== Demographics ==
From the 2001 census, the area had a population of 7,395. Of this figure, 79% described themselves as Christian. At the 2008 local elections, the valid electorate for Ingol ward was 5,642.

== Geography ==
The ward is in the west of the city with the M55 motorway at its northern edge, largely following Woodplumpton Road from Tulketh to the boundary of Woodplumpton parish, then continuing through terraced and detached housing in an easterly direction. A number of Preston Bus services use the local roads through the area.

== Ingol and Tanterton neighbourhood ==
Civil parishes in the City of Preston
- Barton
- Broughton
- Goosnargh
- Grimsargh
- Haighton
- Ingol & Tanterton
- Lea
- Whittingham
- Woodplumpton

In April 2012, the civil parish of Ingol and Tanterton was created, styled as a "neighbourhood" with a neighbourhood council. The neighbourhood has the same boundaries as Ingol ward, and was previously part of the unparished area of Preston.

== See also ==
- Preston local elections
- Districts of Preston

== Sources ==
- "Existing ward arrangements" (PDF). opsi.gov.uk. Archived (PDF) from the original on 18 December 2010.
