= Cadley, Lancashire =

Coordinates: 53.781°N 2.720°W

Cadley
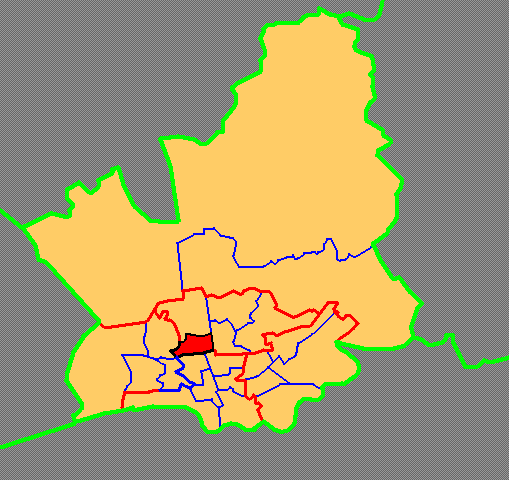
- Ward location within the City of Preston district

- Location in Preston Location within Lancashire
- Population: 4,589 (2011)
- District: City of Preston
- Ceremonial county: Lancashire
- Region: North West
- Country: England
- Sovereign state: United Kingdom
- UK Parliament: Preston
- Councillors: John Bruton – Liberal Democrats; John Potter – Liberal Democrats

Cadley is a largely residential suburban area of Preston, Lancashire, England, and an electoral ward. The population of the ward taken at the 2011 census was 4,589. It is usually considered to be a district of the larger suburb of Fulwood (and formed part of the pre-1974 Fulwood Urban District), but was historically separate as evidenced, for instance, in the name of Fulwood and Cadley County Primary School.

Cadley is a district of Preston positioned to the north of the city centre, with two main roads to its east and west; the B5411 Woodplumpton Road to its west, Black Bull Lane to its east. The West Coast Main Line runs through the area, although its major transport links are served by the local and national bus routes criss-crossing its boundaries. The ward of Cadley is a two-member electoral division, returning two councillors to Town Hall. With the neighbouring Greyfriars ward, it forms the Preston North division of Lancashire County Council.

At the 2001 census, the population of Cadley was 4,698, with over 85% regarding themselves as Christian. At the most recent election in Cadley, the 2010 by-election, the total valid electorate was 3,772. In 2006 there was an electorate of 3,746, whilst the elections in 2008 had an electorate of 3,778.

== Current members ==
| Election | Member | Party |
|---|---|---|
| 2022 Preston City Council election | Phoenix Adair | Liberal Democrats |
| 2019 Preston City Council election | John Potter | Liberal Democrats |
| 2019 Preston City Council election | Debbie Shannon | Liberal Democrats |
