= Grimsargh =

Village in Lancashire, England

Coordinates: 53.805°N 2.631°W

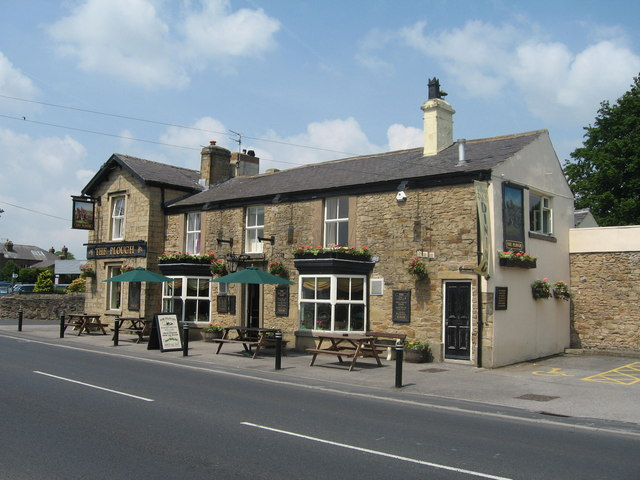
- The Plough in 2007

- Shown within the City of Preston district Location within Lancashire
- Population: 2,912 (2021)
- OS grid reference: SD585345
- Civil parish: Grimsargh
- District: Preston
- Shire county: Lancashire
- Region: North West
- Country: England
- Sovereign state: United Kingdom
- Post town: PRESTON
- Postcode district: PR2
- Dialling code: 01772
- Police: Lancashire
- Fire: Lancashire
- Ambulance: North West
- UK Parliament: Ribble Valley

Civil parishes in the City of Preston
- Barton
- Broughton
- Goosnargh
- Grimsargh
- Haighton
- Ingol & Tanterton
- Lea
- Whittingham
- Woodplumpton

Grimsargh is a village and civil parish in the City of Preston, Lancashire, England. It is located approximately 6 miles (10 km) east of Preston.

== History ==
The name Grimsargh is said to derive from an Old Norse name Grímr with Norse erg. One reference lists it as coming from the Domesday Book's Grimesarge, "at the temple of Grimr" (a name for Odin).

Oliver Cromwell's Roundhead army came through Grimsargh en route to what is now Walton-le-Dale in Preston, on what became known as the Battle of Preston on 17 August 1648.

In 1868 by E. G. Paley was contracted to rebuild the nave and added a tower to an existing chapel in the village. Known today as St Michael's Church it is in sandstone with slate roofs, and consists of a nave, a north aisle, a chancel, a northeast vestry, and a west tower. The tower is in three stages, and has a southeast stair turret, angle buttresses, an embattled parapet, and a pyramidal roof.

The parish was formed on 1 April 1934 from the merger of the parish of Elston with half of the parish of Grimsargh-with-Brockholes, both of which were formed in 1866. The parish was part of Preston Rural District until its abolition in 1974, and in turn part of the much larger Amounderness hundred, in which Preston was also included. In 1974 the parish became part of the Borough of Preston, which became a city in 2002.

== Transport ==
=== Railway ===
The village was once served by Grimsargh railway station on the now dismantled Preston to Longridge railway line. The station closed to passengers in May 1930, before being closed completely in 1967. A junction and platform to the north east of the station allowed passengers to board trains to the nearby Whittingham Hospital via the private Whittingham Hospital Railway, which closed in 1957.

=== Bus ===
The village is served by route 1 operated by Stagecoach with frequent services to Preston and Longridge. Routes 99 & 842 also serve the village, but only operate a limited service.

== Industry ==
The village has one public house, The Plough, situated in the village centre. The pub has won several county-wide awards for its food and service but has since changed owners. There is also a private members social club in the village.

== Demography ==
According to the 2001 census the parish had a population of 2,164, increasing to 2,653 at the 2011 census. As well as in 2021 increasing to 2,912.

== Community ==
Grimsargh now contains a bowls club, cricket club and pavilion. The cricket club has 5 senior teams. 1 playing on Wednesdays in the Boddington's Village Cricket League. 3 playing on Saturdays in the Moore & Smalley Palace Shield league structure (Divisions 3,4 & 6), and also a Sunday XI playing in the Moore & Smalley Palace Shield Sunday League. Training is held on Tuesdays at the club's home ground on the village green, and the club welcomes new players of all abilities and ages. Grimsargh St. Michael's Church, St. Michael's Primary School and pre-school are all located near the village hall.

Grimsargh Village Hall is a popular and thriving venue for public activities and private events, run by the Grimsargh Village Community Association. The hall also hosts the monthly Grimsargh Farmers' Market which is a well-established and popular market offering a wide range of local produce and crafts.

== Governance ==
The village is now part of the Ribble Valley parliamentary constituency, following boundary changes introduced for the 2024 General Election. It was previously part of the Wyre and Preston North constituency between 2010 and 2024, which was represented by Conservative MP Ben Wallace .

For elections to Lancashire County Council the village of Grimsargh is within the Preston Rural division and is represented by County Councillor Sue Whittam of the Conservative Party.

The parish is part of the electoral ward of Preston Rural East, which returns three councillors to Preston City Council (all currently Conservative. Unlike many other districts of Preston, the ward of Preston Rural East is parished, in that it has within it parish councils with their own structure and elected councillors. The parishes within Preston Rural East are, along with Grimsargh, Haighton, and Broughton-in-Amounderness. Grimsargh has an active parish council, with nine councillors and a clerk.

== Religion ==
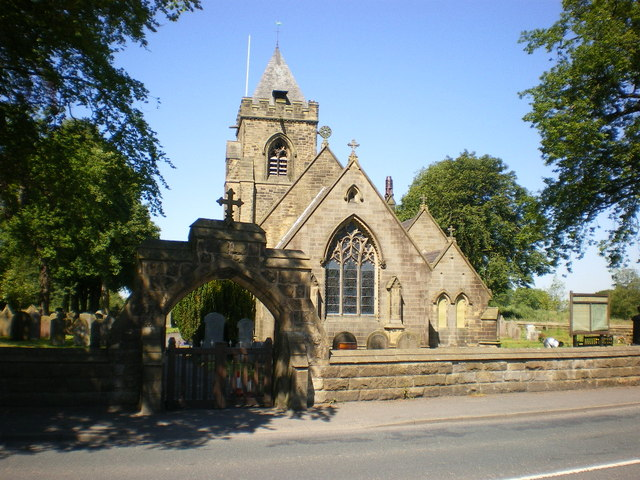
St Michael's Church 2009

The village has one church, St. Michael's Parish Church (CE) in Preston Road.

The Roman Catholic Church of Our Lady and St Michael (also known as Alston Lane Church) lies just 200 metres (200 yd) outside the parish, in the neighbouring parish of Longridge, with a Catholic primary school alongside.

== Geography ==
The village lies between Preston and Longridge, and south east of Goosnargh. Notable features include a large parkland area to the west of the village. Several large reservoirs can be found to the east and these were previously used extensively by local anglers. Savick Brook flows just north of the village. The village is also along the route of the Ribble Way.

== Gallery ==
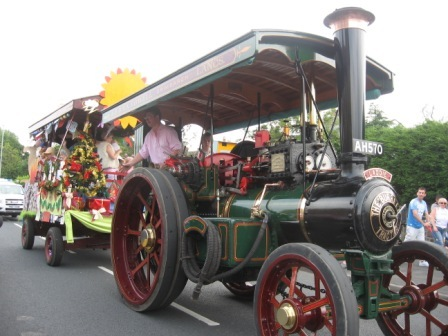
Field Day Parade

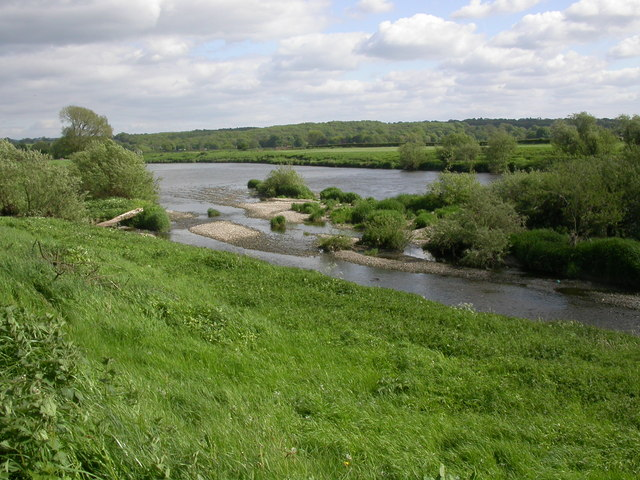
River Ribble near Elston Lane

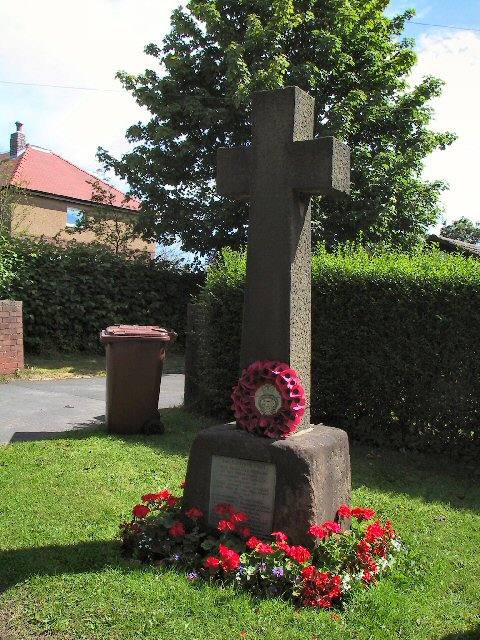
Grimsargh War Memorial

== See also ==
- Listed buildings in Grimsargh

== Sources ==
- Historic England, Listed Buildings
- Hartwell, Clare; Pevsner, Nikolaus (2009). Lancashire: North. Yale University Press.
- Historic England, "Parish church of St. George, Chester Road (1361661)", National Heritage List for England
