= Fulwood, Lancashire =

Suburb of Preston, Lancashire, England

Coordinates: 53.779444°N 2.693611°W

Fulwood
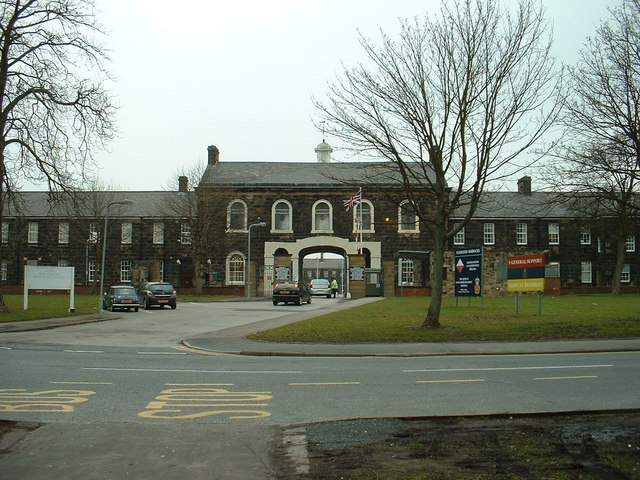
- Fulwood Barracks

- Shown within the City of Preston district Location within Lancashire
- Population: 28,353 (2011)
- OS grid reference: SD5431
- District: Preston
- Shire county: Lancashire
- Region: North West
- Country: England
- Sovereign state: United Kingdom
- Post town: Preston
- Postcode district: PR2
- Dialling code: 01772
- Police: Lancashire
- Fire: Lancashire
- Ambulance: North West
- UK Parliament: Ribble Valley; Preston

Fulwood is a suburb of Preston, Lancashire, England, in the northern half of the City of Preston district. It had a population of 28,535 in 2011 and is made up of five wards.

Fulwood began to develop in the second half of the 19th century and, until 1974, it was governed independently from Preston. It has retained a distinct identity and character, and the majority of the settlement is in the Fulwood Conservation Area.

== History ==
Fulewde, 1199; Fulewude, 1228; Fulwode, 1297. The extract below by John Marius Wilson, Imperial Gazetteer of England and Wales (1870–72) described Fulwood and its history during its early Victorian foundations: "FULWOOD, a township-chapelry in Lancaster parish, Lancashire; on the Lancaster and Preston railway, 1.5 mile N of Preston. It has a station on the railway; and its post town is Preston. Acres, 2077. Real property, £6,218. Pop. in 1851, 1,748; in 1861, 2,313. Houses, 172. This was part of the ancient royal forest of Fulwood, now enclosed; and Preston race-ground was part of it. Extensive barracks are here. The living is a vicarage in the diocese of Manchester."

Historic Fulwood and Cadley" by Carole Knight and Margaret Burscough, published by Carnegie Press in 1998 provides a comprehensive history of Fulwood.

== Economy and society ==
Fulwood has expanded in the 20th century, and has been popular with housing and business developers, with its close links to the M6 and M55 motorways. Since the 1970s when the Central Lancashire New Town was proposed, large sites have been made available for development, such as Longsands, which is a residential area, and "East Preston", where many businesses are currently located, including the Lancashire Evening Post (LEP), Asda, Royal Mail sorting office, Independent Inspections, Xchanging, CPC, EDS and Holiday Inn. The B6241 (Eastway) provides a vital route, bypassing much of the residential and central areas of Preston, and a road via Longsands connects it to the M6 motorway (at junction 31A which was opened in the 1990s) and the Bluebell Way business park on the boundary with Brookfield.

It is also the home of the Royal Preston Hospital, Sharoe Green Hospital was also in Fulwood until its closure in 2004.

Fulwood Barracks has been the home of the Duke of Lancaster's Regiment, and other regiments, and is the site of the Queen's Lancashire Regiment Museum.

A notable former resident was Major John Rouse Merriott Chard, of the Royal Engineers, V.C., officer commanding at Rorke's Drift in 1879. He was posted to Preston between 1887 and 1892, and is recorded in the 1891 Census living at 80 Victoria Road, Fulwood.

Since the mass migration of Indians, Fulwood has been a popular place of residence for well-known, and wealthy families of the Vora Patel community, many of whom have resided here for several generations. Many families of this community amassed great wealths during the economic prosperity of the textiles industry in Northern England and, to this day, retain much of their wealth and have bought many of Lancashire's historic properties.

== Architecture ==
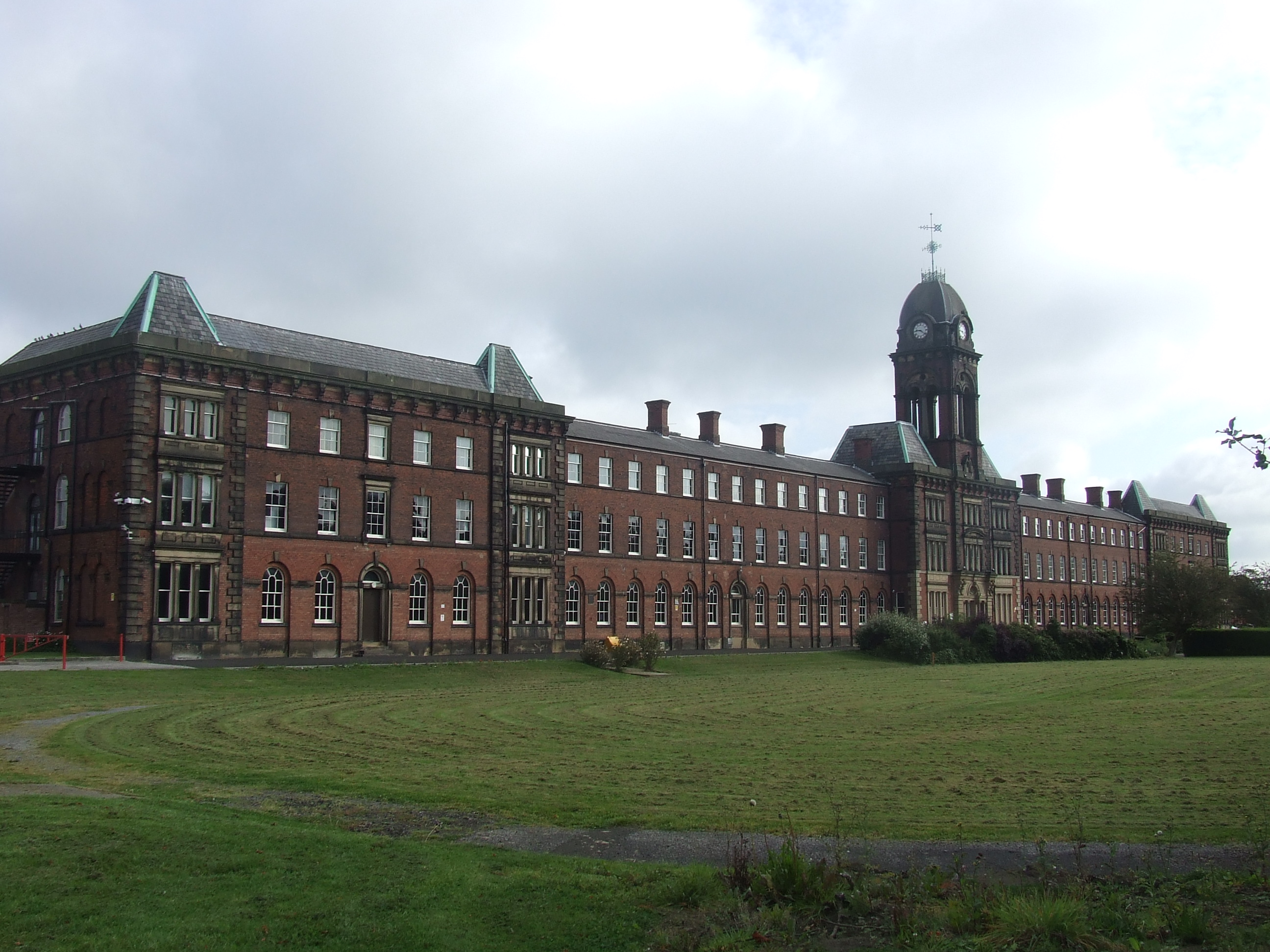
The former Fulwood Workhouse

Fulwood is one of the greener parts of the Preston area, however it is nevertheless a fairly built up area, with buildings dating back to the Victorian gentrification of the region, and earlier. Due to large investments during the late Victorian era, Fulwood was an area of much development by wealthy Preston industrialists. Some of the finest Victorian buildings of Lancashire can be found in Fulwood, such as the Fulwood Barracks, Fulwood Union Workhouse, and Harris Orphanage. Many of the larger houses in Fulwood were also built during the Victorian period, particularly those in the Nooklands cul-de-sac.

== Parks ==
The town has seven different greens, consisting of Conway Drive, South Drive, Mill Lane, Sherwood, Levensgarth Avenue, Tower Lane and Andertons Way. This makes Fulwood one of the greener districts of Preston.

== Education ==
=== State-funded schools ===
State education is administered by Lancashire County Council.

==== Primary schools ====
- Fulwood and Cadley Primary School
- Fulwood St Peter's Church of England Primary School
- Harris Primary School
- Kennington Primary School
- Longsands Community Primary School
- Queen's Drive Primary School
- Our Lady and St Edwards Catholic Primary School
- St Clare's Catholic Primary School
- St Anthony's Catholic Primary School
- Sherwood Primary School

==== Secondary schools ====
- Archbishop Temple School
- Corpus Christi Catholic High School
- Fulwood Academy
- Our Lady's Catholic High School

==== Special schools ====
- Moorbrook School

=== Independent schools ===
==== Private junior and prep schools ====
- Highfield Priory School
- St Pius X Preparatory School

=== Further education ===
The main campus of Preston's College is located in Fulwood on St Vincent's Road.

== Politics ==
Fulwood shown with the electoral wards of the City of Preston

The electoral wards which make up the area of Fulwood are; Sharoe Green, College, Cadley, Greyfriars and Garrison. Parts of the rural wards, named as Preston Rural East and Preston Rural North, were in the former Preston Rural District. Preston Council meetings are hosted every 3 months classified as Area Forum Meetings, of which Fulwood is the Northern Area Forum.

Until 2010, the wards which make up Fulwood were split unevenly between three Westminster constituencies;

- Ribble Valley - parts of Rural North and Rural East, Greyfriars, Garrison, the northern parts of College, Sharoe Green, Cadley
- Preston - southern parts of College ward
- Fylde - elements of Preston Rural North and West.

Following the Boundary Commission for England's review of parliamentary representation in Lancashire, the Boundary Commission moved the whole of Fulwood into a new constituency of Wyre and Preston North from the 2010 General Election.

Following a further boundary review completed in 2023, Fulwood is again split between parliamentary constituencies, with Greyfriars and Sharoe Green being moved into a revised Ribble Valley constituency and the rest of Fulwood being included in the Preston constituency. These changes took effect for the 2024 General Election.

For Preston City Council elections, see Preston local elections

Between 1894 and 1974 Fulwood was governed by Fulwood Urban District council which was merged with other districts under the Local Government Act 1972 to become the new non-metropolitan district of the Borough (now City) of Preston.

== Sport ==
Fulwood has one men's cricket team in the competitive Lancashire league structure, Fulwood & Broughton CC (known as F&B). The 1st XI playing in the Northern Premier Cricket League, with other teams playing in the Palace Shield structure. There is also a T20 and women's team at the club. There are two social men's cricket teams in Fulwood; an F&B midweek team and Preston Grasshoppers CC, both of whom play in the Boddingtons Village Cricket League.

Fulwood's local football team is Fulwood Amateurs F.C. (known as Fulwood Ams). The men's 1st XI play in the West Lancashire League Premier Division (Level 11 in the English football pyramid). In the 2021-22 season, Fulwood Amateurs won the Lancashire FA Amateur Shield.

Preston's rugby union team, Preston Grasshoppers R.F.C. (known as Hoppers), are based in Fulwood. The men's 1st XV play in the RFU National League 2 North (Level 4 in the English rugby union pyramid), with 4 other men's senior teams in the North West Leagues, and a women's team in the Women's NC 1 North West. Hoppers are one of the oldest rugby clubs in the north of England, and in the 2021-22 season, they won the John Burgess Lancashire Cup.

Fulwood Leisure Centre is on Black Bull Lane.

Preston's Guild Wheel cycle route runs through Fulwood.

== Transport ==
Fulwood railway station was once in Gamull Lane, on the border between Fulwood and Ribbleton, on the Longridge Branch Line. It was renamed Ribbleton railway station in 1900 and closed in 1930.

Fulwood is served by several bus routes operated by Preston Bus, Stagecoach Merseyside & South Lancashire and Stagecoach Cumbria & North Lancashire.

There are cycle paths from Fulwood through Lancaster to Carnforth, as well as the Guild Wheel.

== See also ==
- Christ Church, Fulwood
