= 2007 Preston City Council election =

2007 UK local government election

Map of the results of the 2007 Preston council election. Conservatives in blue, Labour in red, Liberal Democrats in yellow, Respect Party in light red and independent in light grey. Wards in dark grey were not contested in 2007.

Elections to the Preston City Council took place on 3 May 2007.

Preston council is elected "in thirds" which means one councillor from each three-member ward, and councillors from selected two-member wards, are elected each year, with one year free from all elections to ensure all councillors serve a full term.

Due to the "in thirds" system, these election results are compared to the 2003 Preston Council election. Councillors elected this year will defend their seats four years later in 2011.

For further information, see Preston local elections

Preston local election result 2007
Party	Seats	Gains	Losses	Net gain/loss	Seats %	Votes %	Votes	+/−
Conservative	8	1	0	+1	42.1	40.0	11,826	+2.0%
Labour	7	0	1	-1	36.8	30.0	8,659	+2.4%
Liberal Democrats	2	1	1	0	10.5	21.9	6,536	-4.3%
Respect	1	0	0	0	5.3	6.5	1,941	+0.4%
Green	0	0	0	0	0.0	0.2	63	-0.9%
Independent	1	0	0	0	5.3	2.8	840	N/A

== Ashton ==
The two-member Ashton division is a suburban ward in the north-west of the city. It has a number of schools in its borders. The ward is predominantly used as a commuting hub although recent increases in student numbers has seen the terraces used for multi-occupancy housing.

Preston City Council Elections: Ashton ward 2007
Party	Candidate	Votes	%	±%
Conservative	William (Bill) Tyson	550	45.6	−8.7
Labour	Phil Crowe	480	39.8	−5.8
Liberal Democrats	Jennifer Buxton	176	14.6	N/A
Majority		70		−26
Rejected ballots		6		
Turnout		1,212	39.0	+6.0
Conservative hold		Swing		

== Brookfield ==
In the north east of the city, the predominantly low income housing of Brookfield is a three-member ward. Buttressed up against Ribbleton and the rural east, and wedge-shaped to the south of Fulwood, the ward has been troubled by increasing levels of crime in recent years. Parts of the ward were formerly within the Fulwood district council and maintain the look of the affluent northern quarters of the city.

Preston City Council Elections: Brookfield ward 2007
Party	Candidate	Votes	%	±%
Labour	Nerys Eaves	691	53.2	−0.5
Conservative	Hussain Mulla	309	23.8	−22.5
Liberal Democrats	Ruth McPheat	300	23.1	N/A
Majority		382		+294
Rejected ballots		13		
Turnout		1,306	24.9	
Labour hold		Swing		

== College ==
Created in the last round of local boundary reviews, the two-member College ward centres on two Fulwood employers. Preston College has a catchment area far beyond the city itself, whilst the recently closed Sharoe Green hospital has had many of its services re-directed to the Royal Preston Hospital. There are a mix of commuter and student housing and an increasing Muslim population.

Preston City Council Elections: College ward 2007
Party	Candidate	Votes	%	±%
Conservative	Jill Truby	830	61.8	+6.6
Liberal Democrats	Stephen Wilkinson	307	22.9	−7.9
Labour	Bert Williams	205	15.3	+1.3
Majority		523		
Rejected ballots		9		
Turnout		1,351	48.8	
Conservative hold		Swing		

== Deepdale ==
Two member Deepdale was once reportedly the most deprived in England, and remains a ward of notable problems in health and housing. The ward contains Preston North End's Deepdale stadium and some of the oldest terraced housing in the city.

Preston City Council Elections: Deepdale ward 2007
Party	Candidate	Votes	%	±%
Independent	Joyce Cartwright	840	52.1	−12.8
Labour	Anis Faruki	565	35.0	+12.2
Conservative	Jane Balshaw	121	7.5	−4.8
Liberal Democrats	John Potter	85	5.3	N/A
Majority		275		
Rejected ballots		8		
Turnout		1,619	42.4	
Independent hold		Swing		

== Garrison ==
Centred on Fulwood Barracks, this is a three-member ward created by the last round of boundary reviews. It is set in a heavily small "c" conservative part of Preston with a number of schools and small employment centres.

Preston City Council Elections: Garrison ward 2007
Party	Candidate	Votes	%	±%
Conservative	Christine Thomas	1,114	58.5	−4.4
Liberal Democrats	Marie Milne	455	23.9	+5.4
Labour	William Burke	336	17.6	−0.9
Majority		659		
Rejected ballots		7		
Turnout		1,912	36.1	
Conservative hold		Swing		

== Greyfriars ==
Its name coming from a large private estate within its boundaries, Greyfriars is one of the oldest names connected to Preston's history. It includes the Pius X Preparatory school and Fulwood's leisure centre. An increasing number of comfortable suburban houses has been built on the fringes of the ward, which also borders Ingol Golf Course.

Preston City Council Elections: Greyfriars ward 2007
Party	Candidate	Votes	%	±%
Conservative	Stephen Thompson	1,532	66.8	+3.9
Liberal Democrats	John Porter	502	21.9	+3.4
Labour	Alan Woods	260	11.3	−7.2
Majority		1,030		
Rejected ballots		10		
Turnout		2,304	44.0	
Conservative hold		Swing		

== Ingol ==
Ingol ward is in the north west of the city, bordered by Greyfriars and to the south of the M55 motorway. The ward contains two main population areas, Ingol and Tanterton. The latter has had problems with drugs and crime over recent years but this is beginning to improve. Parts of the ward are comfortable with some commuter areas and houses neighbouring the Lancaster canal. There are still pockets of troubled communities.

With two councillors elected in the 2003 elections, there can be no direct comparison between results.

Preston City Council Elections: Ingol ward 2007
Party	Candidate	Votes	%	±%
Liberal Democrats	Peter Pringle	919	57.7	
Conservative	Michael Chadha	450	28.2	
Labour	Shahzad Malik	224	14.0	
Majority		469		
Rejected ballots		6		
Turnout		1,599	30.1	
Liberal Democrats hold		Swing		

== Larches ==
In the west of the city, around 30 minutes from the city centre, Larches is a box-shaped ward from the Riversway dual-carriageway into Blackpool to Haslam Park. It contains two post-war housing estates, Larches and Savick, and an area of suburban sprawl moved in from Ashton following boundary changes. The ward contains the whole of Ashton Park.

Preston City Council Elections: Larches ward 2007
Party	Candidate	Votes	%	±%
Liberal Democrats	Rob Osinski	805	44.6	+9.2
Labour	Martyn Rawlinson	688	38.1	−0.4
Conservative	Christine Sharpe	312	17.3	−8.8
Majority		117		
Rejected ballots		9		
Turnout		1,814	33.1	
Liberal Democrats gain from Labour		Swing		

== Lea ==
The three member ward of Lea contains the small Fylde border town of Lea Town, the urban Lea community and the sprawling green-belt community of Cottam. The ward follows the parish council boundary of Lea & Cottam Parish Council. Cottam has grown from a small farming community to a large private housing development populated by young families and business people.

Preston City Council Elections: Lea ward 2007
Party	Candidate	Votes	%	±%
Conservative	Julie Buttle	1,009	56.7	+19.7
Liberal Democrats	Pauline Brown	580	32.6	−16.3
Labour	Drew Gale	192	10.8	−3.4
Majority		429		
Turnout		1,781	38.5	
Conservative gain from Liberal Democrats		Swing		

== Moor Park ==
Based on the Plungington community and bordering both the neat suburban terraces of southern Fulwood and the University of Central Lancashire campus, the Moor Park ward has a high number of student housing in converted Victorian housing and neater family houses. Moor Park itself is included in this ward, in the shadow of Deepdale football stadium.

Preston City Council Elections: Moor Park ward 2007
Party	Candidate	Votes	%	±%
Labour	Frank de Molfetta	594	59.2	−12.2
Conservative	Julian Sedgewick	234	23.3	−5.3
Liberal Democrats	Lydia Livingston	176	17.5	N/A
Majority		360		
Rejected ballots		7		
Turnout		1,011	28.9	
Labour hold		Swing		

== Preston Rural East ==
The large Rural East wards contains the Amounderness, Broughton and Grimsargh communities in the north and east of the city.

Preston City Council Elections: Rural East ward 2007
Party	Candidate	Votes	%	±%
Conservative	Neil Cartwright	994	72.8	−6.0
Labour	John Houghton	208	15.2	−6.0
Liberal Democrats	Julie Voges	164	12.0	N/A
Majority		786		
Rejected ballots		5		
Turnout		1,371	38.3	
Conservative hold		Swing		

== Preston Rural North ==
Over reaching across the city of Preston is the large Preston Rural North ward, which includes the M6 and M55 motorways and acres of market towns, farming communities and rural areas. The boroughs of Fylde and Wyre border this northern ward, which is a three-member ward.

Preston City Council Elections: Rural North ward 2007
Party	Candidate	Votes	%	±%
Conservative	Kate Calder	1,799	76.9	
Liberal Democrats	Bill Parkinson	355	15.2	
Labour	Pauline Jackson	185	7.9	
Majority		1,444		
Rejected ballots		9		
Turnout		2,348	44.3	
Conservative hold		Swing		

== Ribbleton ==
Ribbleton, in the east of the city, grew massively as council housing was built around former mill worker terraces; now the ward is one of the largest in area in size{ and shows all the expected issues of high level crime and deprivation. Ribbleton, in common with the neighbouring Brookfield ward, is overwhelmingly white working class.

Preston City Council Elections: Ribbleton ward 2007
Party	Candidate	Votes	%	±%
Labour	Brian Rollo	731	56.3	−8.9
Conservative	Paul Henry Balshaw	337	26.0	−8.8
Liberal Democrats	Christine Billington	230	17.7	N/A
Majority		394		
Rejected ballots		5		
Turnout		1,303	24.2	
Labour hold		Swing		

== Riversway ==
The Riversway ward has three distinct elements. Broadgate, a comfortable estate of Victorian housing with a high percentage of student housing; new build housing on the former British Aerospace site; and the redeveloped marina. The former Preston Port, one of the largest in its time, has been redeveloped to feature shopping units and new build housing of some considerable expense. The Preston Docks and surrounding area has a sizable area of Development including new Supermarkets, Car dealers and trade outlets.

A Hindu temple, Lancashire County Council's headquarters and Preston's railway station are in the Riversway ward.

Preston City Council Elections: Riversway ward 2007
Party	Candidate	Votes	%	±%
Labour	Bhikhu Patel	577	41.2	−6.4
Respect	Elaine Abbott	386	27.6	N/A
Conservative	Ronnie Smith	242	17.3	−7.8
Liberal Democrats	Wilf Gavin	194	13.9	−13.4
Majority		191		
Rejected ballots		7		
Turnout		1,406	34.0	
Labour hold		Swing		

== Sharoe Green ==
Lodged in the south-central area of Fulwood, the Sharoe Green ward is based on the former hospital and surrounding commuter belt environs.

Preston City Council Elections: Sharoe Green ward 2007
Party	Candidate	Votes	%	±%
Conservative	Eric Fazackerley	1,129	58.9	−0.8
Liberal Democrats	Fiona Wren	490	25.5	+4.0
Labour	Terry Mattinson	299	15.6	−3.1
Majority		639		
Rejected ballots		5		
Turnout		1,923	37.7	
Conservative hold		Swing		

== St Matthews ==
A wedge-shaped ward in between the streets of Ribbleton and the city centre, this ward contains some deprived housing in the process of renewal, and in the recent months expensive new-build conversions.

Preston City Council Elections: St Matthews ward 2007
Party	Candidate	Votes	%	±%
Labour	Javed Iqbal	675	50.0	−22.5
Respect	Sumera Mir Rizwan	339	25.1	N/A
Conservative	Peter McElhone	170	12.6	−14.9
Liberal Democrats	Tracey Singleton	166	12.3	N/A
Majority		336		
Rejected ballots		10		
Turnout		1,360	28.3	
Labour hold		Swing		

== Town Centre ==
Formed by boundary changes prior to Preston being awarded city status, Town Centre is the largest non-rural ward in the borough. There are three distinct parts to this central seat, namely Avenham, Frenchwood and the city centre itself.

The ward includes student developments and converted student homes in Avenham; expensive new build developments around the historic Winckley Square; and the Frenchwood area on the banks of the River Ribble. Avenham was notorious for high levels of crime and deprivation, but this is turning around with the establishment of community groups and private housing associations funding renewal. There is a sizable Muslim population in Avenham and Frenchwood.

Preston City Council Elections: Town Centre ward 2007
Party	Candidate	Votes	%	±%
Respect	Michael Lavalette	1,179	52.3	+14.2
Labour	Salim Desai	717	31.8	+1.1
Liberal Democrats	Helen Greaves	206	9.2	−6.1
Conservative	Susan Horn	87	3.9	−12.0
Green	Rupert Wadsworth	63	2.8	N/A
Majority		462	20.45	+19.11
Rejected ballots		7		
Turnout		2,259	46.4	
Respect hold		Swing		

== Tulketh ==
Tulketh ward is a central and entirely urban ward north of the university complex, and to the east of Ashton. Its main population areas are traditional terrace housing, which mixes families with small shops including the Lane Ends shopping village and student housing.

Preston City Council Elections: Tulketh ward 2007
Party	Candidate	Votes	%	±%
Labour	Robert Boswell	753	48.9	−2.0
Conservative	Harry Landless	523	34.0	−15.1
Liberal Democrats	Liam Pennington	263	17.1	N/A
Majority		230		
Rejected ballots		11		
Turnout		1,550	30.6	
Labour hold		Swing		

== University ==
Shaped around the outskirts of the city centre, this butterfly-wing shaped ward was formed following the recent boundary changes. It took from the oversized Riversway ward electors from the St Pauls and Maudland areas as well as the university campus itself. It is a two-member ward. It is populated by a mixture of student halls and terrace houses, with just less than half of the population being students. 2001 Census Information

Preston City Council Elections: University ward 2007
Party	Candidate	Votes	%	±%
Labour	John Swindells	279	49.6	−9.4
Liberal Democrats	Rick Seymour	163	29.0	N/A
Conservative	Samir Vohra	84	14.9	−26.1
Respect	Dave Orr	37	6.6	N/A
Majority		116		
Rejected ballots		1		
Turnout		564	24.2	
Labour hold		Swing		

== See also ==
- Preston (UK Parliament constituency)
