= Lea, Lancashire =

Coordinates: 53.774°N 2.795°W

Lea
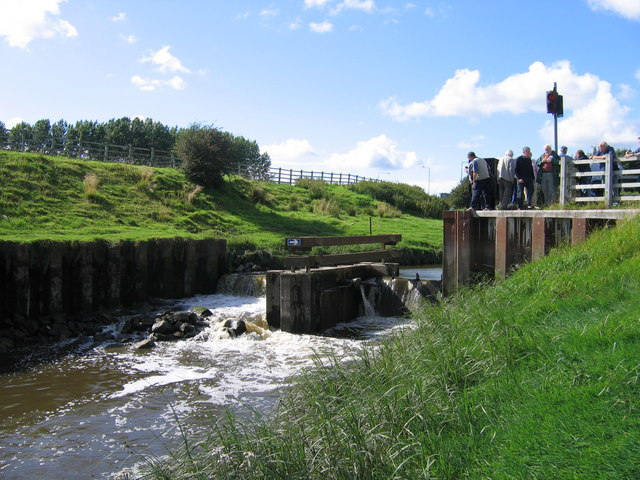
- Navigation weir on Savick Brook

- Lea Town shown within the City of Preston district Lea Town shown on the Fylde Location within Lancashire
- Population: 5,962 (2001)
- OS grid reference: SD476311
- Civil parish: Lea
- District: Preston
- Shire county: Lancashire
- Region: North West
- Country: England
- Sovereign state: United Kingdom
- Post town: PRESTON
- Postcode district: PR2, PR4
- Dialling code: 01772
- Police: Lancashire
- Fire: Lancashire
- Ambulance: North West
- UK Parliament: Preston

Civil parishes in the City of Preston
- Barton
- Broughton
- Goosnargh
- Grimsargh
- Haighton
- Ingol & Tanterton
- Lea
- Whittingham
- Woodplumpton

Lea (/ˈliːə/ LEE-ə), Cottam, and Lea Town are villages in the City of Preston, Lancashire, England. Together they form the civil parish of Lea and Cottam, which has a population of 5,962. In 2011, the population increased to 6,157.

== Geography ==
Lea is the name given to two areas of the western extremities of Preston; Lea Town (a village, despite its name) on the Fylde border, which had a population of 291 in 2011, and the suburban sprawl of Lea along the Blackpool Road through the city.

Lea Town and Lea were called English Lea and French Lea in the 11th to 13th centuries; "French" because there was a Norman landowner.

Cottam is a former farming community now almost entirely consisting of new build housing.

== Governance ==
The area is represented by Lea and Cottam Parish Council.

Lea and Cottam form part of both the Lea & Larches and Ingol & Cottam wards of Preston City Council, both of which elect three councillors.

The area is part of the Preston West division on Lancashire County Council which elects one councillor every four years.

From the 2024 General Election, the area is also part of Preston parliamentary constituency, having previously been part of the Fylde constituency.

== Demography ==
From the last census, in 2001, over 83% of the population regarded themselves as Christian, whilst the figure of 11.5% for retired people is one of the highest in the city.

== Religion ==
There are several churches in Lea including Lea Methodist and St. Christopher's. St. Christopher's is home to 2nd Lea Scout Group.

The Roman Catholic Churches of St Andrew & Blessed George Haydock and St Mary's are located in Cottam and Lea Town respectively.

== History ==
The parish of Lea was formed on 1 April 1934 from part of the former parish of Lea Ashton Ingol and Cottam, which was formed in 1866. Lea parish was part of Preston Rural District until its abolition in 1974. In 1974 the parish became part of the Borough of Preston, which became a city in 2002.

The area was served by Lea Road railway station between 1840 and 1938.

== Notable people ==
- Gordon Ashcroft, footballer

== See also ==
- Listed buildings in Lea, Lancashire

== Gallery ==
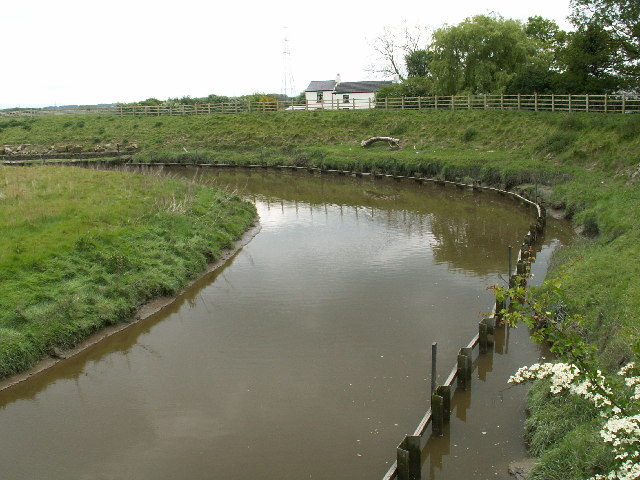
Savick Brook

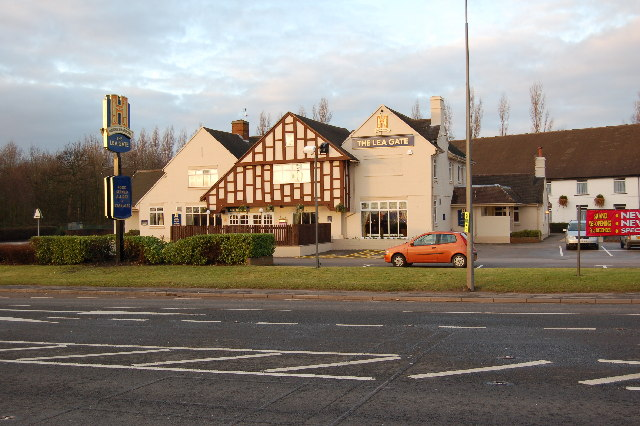
The Lea Gate
