= 2008 Preston City Council election =

2008 UK local government election

Map of the results of the 2008 Preston council election. Conservatives in blue, Labour in red, Liberal Democrats in yellow and independent in light grey. Wards in dark grey were not contested in 2008.

Elections to Preston City Council took place on 1 May 2008.

Preston council is elected "in thirds" which means one councillor from each three-member ward, and councillors from selected two-member wards, are elected each year, with one year free from all elections to ensure all councillors serve a full term.

Due to the "in thirds" system, these election results are compared to the 2004 Preston Council election.

== Summary ==
In this summary, "seats" represent the number of wards each party are defending. In two cases this year, the winning candidate in 2004 has since defected to another party, but for comparison the defending party is that from 2004.

Preston local election result 2008
Party	Seats	Gains	Losses	Net gain/loss	Seats %	Votes %	Votes	+/−
Conservative	7	2	1	1	42 (8/19)	42.3	12,423	-2,331
Labour	7	1	1	+0	37 (7/19)	28.9	8,503	-1,942
Liberal Democrats	4	0	1	-1	16 (3/19)	24.8	7,297	-1,884
Left List	0	0	0	0	0	0.6	99	n/a
Green	0	0	0	0	0	0.4	75	n/a
England First	0	0	0	0	0	0.6	109	-259
Independent	1	0	0	0	5 (1/19)	3.0	891	-30
No description	0	0	0	0	0	3.2	945	n/a

In this summary box, The Left List are a party split from RESPECT - The Unity Coalition.

== Ashton ==
Won in corresponding 2004 elections by Conservative Party, majority 51

Preston City Council Elections: Ashton ward 2008
Party	Candidate	Votes	%	±%
Conservative	Keith Sedgewick	657	54.7	+12.8
Labour	Phil Crowe	544	45.3	+6.9
Majority		113		+62
Turnout		1,201	37%	−6

== Brookfield ==
Won in corresponding 2004 elections by Labour Party, majority 265

Preston City Council Elections: Brookfield ward 2008
Party	Candidate	Votes	%	±%
Conservative	Robert Cartwright	788	53.1	+25.4
Labour	Jonathan Saksena	697	46.9	+5.8
Majority		91		
Turnout		1,485	28%	−9
Conservative gain from Labour		Swing	+10.0	

== Cadley ==
Won in corresponding 2004 elections by Liberal Democrats, majority 329

Preston City Council Elections: Cadley ward 2008
Party	Candidate	Votes	%	±%
Liberal Democrats	Michael Onyon	1,010	57.1	+5.0
Conservative	Steven Johnston	624	35.3	−1.0
Labour	William Burke	136	7.7	−3.9
Majority		386		+57
Turnout		1,770	47%	−7

== Deepdale ==
Won in corresponding 2004 elections by independent, majority 221

Preston City Council Elections: Deepdale ward 2008
Party	Candidate	Votes	%	±%
Independent	Terry Cartwright	891	57.4	+11.3
Labour	Anis Faruki	543	35.0	+24.0
Conservative	Sheila Heys	118	7.6	−0.3
Majority		348		+127
Turnout		1,552	40%	−12

== Fishwick ==
Won in corresponding 2004 elections by Conservative Party, majority 41. The winning candidate subsequently defected to the Liberal Democrats (and switched back to the Conservatives after losing the 2008 election). The result in 2008 will be based on the Conservative "defence", as is normal practice when comparing election results.

Preston City Council Elections: Fishwick ward 2008
Party	Candidate	Votes	%	±%
Labour	Martyn Rawlinson	608	48.1	+13.2
Liberal Democrats	Sharon Riley	550	43.5	N/A
No description	Peter Agland	107	8.4	N/A
Majority		58		
Turnout		1,265	34%	−4
Labour gain from Conservative		Swing		

== Garrison ==
Won in corresponding 2004 elections by Conservative Party, majority 650

Preston City Council Elections: Garrison ward 2008
Party	Candidate	Votes	%	±%
Conservative	Stuart Greenhalgh	1,207	66.8	+13.3
Labour	Bert Williams	324	17.9	−3.4
Liberal Democrats	Stephen Wilkinson	276	15.3	−9.9
Majority		883		+233
Turnout		1,807	33%	−12

== Greyfrairs ==
Won in corresponding 2004 elections by Conservative Party, majority 1,142

Preston City Council Elections: Greyfriars ward 2008
Party	Candidate	Votes	%	±%
Conservative	Geoff Driver	1,678	71.3	+8.7
Liberal Democrats	John Porter	441	18.7	−7.2
Labour	Alan Woods	236	10.0	−1.1
Majority		1,237		+95
Turnout		2,355		

== Ingol ==
Won in corresponding 2004 elections by Liberal Democrats, majority 380. The winning candidate subsequently defected to the Conservative Party. The result in 2008 will be based on the Liberal Democrat "defence", as is normal practice when comparing election results.

Preston City Council Elections: Ingol ward 2008
Party	Candidate	Votes	%	±%
Liberal Democrats	Pauline Brown	838	48.9	+1.2
Conservative	June Dodd	684	39.9	+9.3
Labour	Shahzad Malik	191	11.2	−10.5
Majority		154		−226
Turnout		1,713		

== Larches ==
Won in corresponding 2004 elections by Liberal Democrats, majority 137

Preston City Council Elections: Larches ward 2008
Party	Candidate	Votes	%	±%
Liberal Democrats	Danny Gallagher	1,011	61.7	+20.6
Labour	Drew Gale	627	38.3	+3.4
Majority		384		+247
Turnout		1,638		

== Lea ==
Won in corresponding 2004 elections by Liberal Democrats, majority 409

Preston City Council Elections: Lea ward 2008
Party	Candidate	Votes	%	±%
Conservative	Trevor Hart	892	48.6	+15.6
Liberal Democrats	Julie Voges	804	43.7	−9.3
Labour	Dave Wilson	141	7.7	−6.2
Majority		88		−
Turnout		1,837		
Conservative gain from Liberal Democrats		Swing		

== Rural East ==
Won in corresponding 2004 elections by Conservative Party, majority 828

Preston City Council Elections: Preston Rural East ward 2008
Party	Candidate	Votes	%	±%
Conservative	Thomas Davies	1,019	73.9	+6.1
Liberal Democrats	Liz Richardson	234	17.0	−2.1
Labour	Pauline Jackson	126	9.1	−4.0
Majority		785		−43
Turnout		1,379	45%	−10%

== Rural North ==
Won in corresponding 2004 elections by Conservative Party, majority 1,711

Preston City Council Elections: Preston Rural North ward 2008
Party	Candidate	Votes	%	±%
Conservative	Anthony Gornall	1,894	81.8	+6.5
Liberal Democrats	Chris Richardson	266	11.5	−3.8
Labour	Derek Barton	156	6.7	−2.7
Majority		1,628		−40
Turnout		2,316	48%	−4%

== Ribbleton ==
Won in corresponding 2004 elections by Labour Party, majority 631

Preston City Council Elections: Ribbleton ward 2008
Party	Candidate	Votes	%	±%
Labour	Nicholas Pomfret	735	57.0	−2.3
Conservative	Christine Sharp	354	27.7	+5.2
Liberal Democrats	Rebecca Finch	200	15.3	−2.9
Majority		381		−250
Turnout			23%	−8

== Riversway ==
Won in corresponding 2004 elections by Labour Party, majority 185

Preston City Council Elections: Riversway ward 2008
Party	Candidate	Votes	%	±%
Labour	Jack Davenport	569	41.9	+7.1
Liberal Democrats	John Potter	318	23.4	+0.6
Conservative	Ronald Smith	187	13.8	−4.6
England First	Mark Cotterill	109	8.0	N/A
Left List	Elaine Abbot	99	7.3	N/A
Green	Kizzi Murtagh	75	5.5	N/A
Majority		251		
Turnout		1,357		

== Sharoe Green ==
Won in corresponding 2004 elections by Conservative Party, majority 639

Preston City Council Elections: Sharoe Green ward 2008
Party	Candidate	Votes	%	±%
Conservative	Terence Thompson	1,178	62.5	+9.9
Liberal Democrats	Fiona Wren	391	20.7	−6.3
Labour	Terry Mattinson	316	16.8	−3.6
Majority		787		+148
Turnout		1,885	37%	−12

== St George's ==
Won in corresponding 2004 elections by Labour Party, majority 185

Preston City Council Elections: St Georges ward 2008
Party	Candidate	Votes	%	±%
Labour Co-op	James Hull	415	52.1	+7.0
Conservative	Hussain Mulla	242	30.4	+2.8
Liberal Democrats	Tracy Singleton	140	17.5	n/a
Majority		173		−12
Turnout		797	25%	−8

== St Matthew's ==
Won in corresponding 2004 elections by Labour Party, majority 199

Preston City Council Elections: St Matthews ward 2008
Party	Candidate	Votes	%	±%
Labour Co-op	Veronica Afrin	780	63.9	+18.7
Conservative	Julian Sedgewick	201	16.5	−4.5
Liberal Democrats	Liam Pennington	179	14.7	n/a
No description	Danielle Field	61	5.0	n/a
Majority		579		+380
Turnout		1,221	24%	−12

== Town Centre ==
Won in corresponding 2004 elections by Labour Party, majority 142

Preston City Council Elections: Town Centre ward 2008
Party	Candidate	Votes	%	±%
Labour	Salim Desai	851	40.9	+1.0
No description	Mukhtar Master	777	37.3	N/A
Conservative	Alun Roberts	268	12.9	+1.4
Liberal Democrats	Jenny Buxton	186	8.9	−4.9
Majority		74		−68
Turnout				

== Tulketh ==
Won in corresponding 2004 elections by Labour Party, majority 49

Held by Labour in 2008 by-election, majority over Liberal Democrats of 23.

Preston City Council Elections: Tulketh ward 2008
Party	Candidate	Votes	%	±%
Labour Co-op	Matthew Brown	507	36.4	−14.9
Liberal Democrats	Rick Seymour	453	32.5	n/a
Conservative	Paul Balshaw	432	31.0	−17.7
Majority		54		+5
Turnout		1,392	26%	−10
