= St Lawrence's Church, Barton =

Coordinates: 53.8289°N 2.7360°W

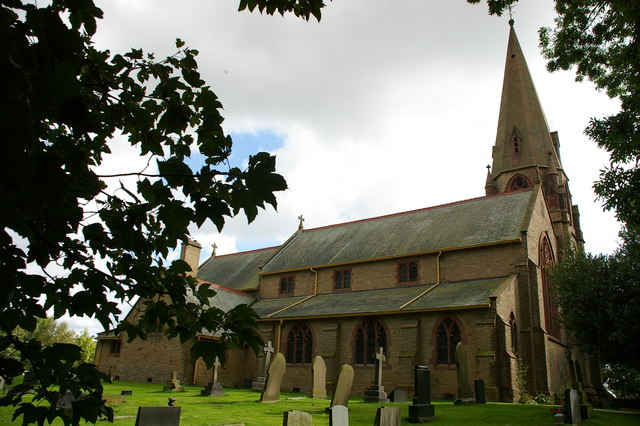
- St Lawrence's Church, Barton, from the north

- Location in the City of Preston
- OS grid reference: SD 517 372
- Location: Garstang Road, Barton, Preston, Lancashire
- Country: England
- Denomination: Anglican
- Website: St Lawrence, Barton

History
- Status: Parish church

Architecture
- Functional status: Active
- Heritage designation: Grade II
- Designated: 13 January 1986
- Architect: R. Knill Freeman
- Architectural type: Church
- Style: Gothic Revival (Decorated)
- Groundbreaking: 1895
- Completed: 1896

Specifications
- Materials: Sandstone, slate roof

Administration
- Province: York
- Diocese: Blackburn
- Archdeaconry: Lancaster
- Deanery: Garstang
- Parish: St Lawrence, Barton

Clergy
- Rector: Revd Gregor Stewart

St Lawrence's Church is in Garstang Road, Barton, Preston, Lancashire, England. It is an active Anglican parish church in the diocese of Blackburn. The church was built in 1895–96, and was designed by R. Knill Freeman. It is constructed in sandstone, and consists of a nave, aisles, a chancel and a southwest steeple. The church holds services on Sundays and Wednesdays. It is recorded in the National Heritage List for England as a designated Grade II listed building.

== History ==
The church was built in 1895–95, replacing an earlier church of 1850, and was designed by R. Knill Freeman. The earlier church is described as a small, whitewashed building without tower or spire having an appearance akin to "a country Methodist Chapel or a sequestered Quaker meeting house".

== Architecture ==
=== Exterior ===
St Lawrence's Church is built in yellow sandstone with red sandstone dressings, and has a slate roof with red ridge tiles. Its architectural style is Decorated. The plan consists of a four-bay nave with a clerestory, north and south aisles, a chancel, a south chapel, and a southwest steeple. The steeple has a two-stage tower with angle buttresses rising to form corner pinnacles, and a south doorway with a moulded surround. Above are two square-headed lancet windows and a clock face. The top stage is octagonal and contains two-light louvred bell openings, and this is surmounted by an octagonal spire with lucarnes. Along the sides of the aisles are buttresses between which are arched three-light windows with intersecting tracery. The clerestory windows each have two round-headed lights, and the chancel windows are similar to those in the aisles, but with Perpendicular tracery. The east and west windows have five lights.

=== Interior ===
Inside the church is a four-bay arcade carried on octagonal columns with moulded caps. The wooden reredos is in Gothic style and has a canopy with pinnacles. The glass in the west window is clear, with insets of a coat of arms and two shields containing boars' heads. The two-manual pipe organ was built in 1897 by Harrison & Harrison, and restored in 1985 by David Wells of Liverpool.

== Appraisal ==
St Lawrence's Church was designated as a Grade II listed building on 13 January 1986. Grade II is the lowest of the three grades of listing and is applied to buildings "of special interest, warranting every effort to preserve them".

== 21st century ==
The church is an active parish church in the deanery of Garstang, the archdeaconry of Lancaster, and the diocese of Blackburn. Its benefice is united with those of St Eadmer, Bleasdale, St Hilda, Bilsborrow, St Mary the Virgin, Goosnargh, and St James, Whitechapel, to form The Fellside Team Ministry.

== See also ==
- Listed buildings in Barton, Preston
