= Parlick Fell =

Parlick Fell may refer to:

- Parlick, a fell in Lancashire, England
- Parlick Fell cheese, made near the fell in Lancashire, England
