= Frech =

Frech is a surname. Notable people with the surname include:

- Ezra Frech (born 2005), American Paralympic athlete
- Fritz Frech (1861–1917), German geologist and paleontologist
- Jessica Frech, American pop/folk singer-songwriter
- Magdalena Fręch (born 1997), Polish tennis player

== See also ==
- Buwch Frech, a cow in Welsh folklore
