= Peter Whittle =

Peter Whittle may refer to:

- Peter Whittle (politician) (1961-2025), former deputy leader of the United Kingdom Independence Party
- Peter Whittle (mathematician) (1927–2021), mathematician and statistician
- Peter Armstrong Whittle (1789–1866), English antiquarian
