= Listed buildings in Whittingham, Lancashire =

Whittingham is a civil parish in the City of Preston, Lancashire, England. It contains 17 listed buildings that are recorded in the National Heritage List for England. Of these, one is at Grade II*, the middle grade, and the others are at Grade II, the lowest grade. The parish contains the village of Whittingham and part of the village of Goosnargh, and is otherwise mainly rural. It also contains the former Whittingham Hospital. Most of the listed buildings in the parish are houses and associated structures, farmhouses, and farm buildings. The other listed buildings are a restored wayside cross, a public house, and the former chapel of the hospital.

== Key ==
Grade	Criteria
II*	Particularly important buildings of more than special interest
II	Buildings of national importance and special interest

== Buildings ==
Name and location	Photograph	Date	Notes	Grade
Stump Cross; 53.83129°N 2.65044°W		Late medieval (probable)	The base of a wayside cross that was discovered during excavations in 1931. It consists of a large rounded boulder, with a modern cross on the top. On the front is an inscribed metal plate.	II
Bottoms Farmhouse; 53.82437°N 2.62856°W	—	17th century (or earlier) (probable)	A cruck-framed farmhouse with sandstone cladding, quoins, and a slate-hung gambrel roof. It has two bays, and 1 1/2 storeys, and a single-storey extension to the right. Inside the house is a full cruck truss.	II
Dun Cow Rib Farmhouse with wall 53.83311°N 2.61474°W	—	1616	The house is in sandstone with quoins and a stone-slate roof, in two storeys and two bays. The doorway has a chamfered surround, a Tudor arched head, an inscribed lintel, and a moulded hood mould. Above these is set a large old bone. The windows are mullioned, and on the right side is a jettied garderobe. The stone garden wall in front of the house is included in the listing.	II
Chingle Old Hall with bridge over moat 53.81662°N 2.67444°W		Early 17th century (probable)	A house in roughcast brick with a slate roof, on a moated site. It has been extended to form a cruciform plan. The house has two storeys and on the front is a two-storey gabled porch. Most of the windows have been altered. Inside the former kitchen is a small inglenook and bressumer. The path leading from the porch crosses the moat on a brick bridge with stone copings. The moated side is a scheduled monument.	II
Whittingham Hall; 53.81921°N 2.66601°W	—	Early 17th century	Originally a manor house, then a farmhouse, and later a house. It is in roughcast brick on a stone plinth, and has a slate roof. It has two storeys and three bays, with a central full-height porch and stair turret, and there are two smaller turrets to the rear. The inner doorway has a Tudor arched head, and a lintel with an incised cross. Inside the house is a timber-framed partition.	II
Barn, Slaters Farm; 53.81991°N 2.69650°W	—	17th century (probable)	A barn and shippon in sandstone and brick, with quoins and a slate roof. It has a T-shaped plan with the shippon protruding at the rear. The barn contains ventilation slits, a wagon entrance, doorways and windows. (Note: Street View in March 2009 shows that the barn and shippon have been converted for domestic use.)	II
Sudell House Farmhouse; 53.81849°N 2.64149°W	—	17th century	A roughcast stone house with a slate roof, it has an L-shaped plan, consisting of a two-bay main range and a two-bay wing at the left. The main range has two storeys and the wing also has an attic. The windows vary, and include a mullioned window in the right gable end. Inside the house is a full-span bressumer.	II
Pigot House; 53.82146°N 2.63117°W	—	1655	A farmhouse in sandstone with quoins and a slate roof. It has two storeys and a T-shaped plan, with a two-bay main range, and a stair turret at the rear rising to a greater height. The doorway has large jambs, an inscribed lintel, and a hood mould. The windows at the front are sashes. and elsewhere there are mullioned windows. Inside the house are timber-framed partitions.	II
Pudding Pie Nook; 53.81310°N 2.69918°W	—	Late 17th century	Originally a farmhouse with attached farm buildings to the east that were later incorporated into one dwelling. It is in brick, partly stuccoed, and has a slate roof. The former house has two bays and two storeys. On the front is a small gabled porch, and the windows, which have been altered, are casements. Inside the house is an inglenook and a bressumer.	II
Ashes Farmhouse with wall 53.83205°N 2.61764°W	—	1683	A sandstone farmhouse with quoins and a slate roof. It has an H-shaped plan, with a single-bay section containing the entrance and a staircase, and two two-bay cross wings. The house has two storeys with attics, the doorway has a chamfered surround, and above it is a datestone. Most of the windows are mullioned. In front of the house is a wall surrounding the rectangular garden. It is in stone, about 10 metres (33 ft) deep and 1 metre (3 ft 3 in) high. The wall has a rounded coping and it incorporates two round-topped gate piers.	II*
Slaters Farmhouse; 53.81988°N 2.69691°W	—	1683	The farmhouse is in roughcast brick with a slate roof, and has two storeys, three bays, and an outshut at the rear. On the front is a two-storey open gabled porch with an inscribed lintel. The inner doorway has a chamfered stone surround, and some of the windows are mullioned. Inside are timber-framed partitions.	II
Albin House; 53.82738°N 2.62863°W	—	Early 18th century	The house is in sandstone with a rendered front, quoins and a slate roof. It has two storeys and three bays, with an outshut at the rear. The doorway has a plain surround, some of the windows are mullioned, and others are sashes or fixed.	II
Green Nook; 53.82642°N 2.61597°W	—	1779	A roughcast house with a slate roof, in two storeys and with a symmetrical two-bay front. The central doorway has an ogee-headed canopy, above which is a datestone, and over that is a gabletted dormer. The other windows are mullioned. On the right is a wing added in the 19th century.	II
Gate piers, Green Nook; 53.82632°N 2.61539°W	—	Late 18th century (probable)	The gate piers, with small curved walls outside them, flank the drive to the house. They are in sandstone and the piers consist of narrow rusticated pillars about 2 metres (6 ft 7 in) high with moulded caps and urn finials.	II
Back Lane Farmhouse and barn 53.82528°N 2.64624°W	—	1783	Originally a farmhouse with an attached barn, later converted into a single dwelling. It is in sandstone with quoins and a slate roof. The former farmhouse has two storeys and two bays. The central doorway has a moulded cornice, above it is a datestone, and the windows are mullioned. In the former barn is a blocked wagon entrance.	II
Bushells Arms; 53.82575°N 2.67100°W		Early 19th century	A public house in sandstone with quoins and a slate roof; the front is stuccoed and the sides are roughcast. The building has two storeys and an L-shaped plan, with a three-bay symmetrical main range and a gabled wing to the left. The central doorway has pilaster jambs and an elliptical fanlight, and the windows are sashes. On the front of the wing is a painted coat of arms.	II
St John's Church; 53.81971°N 2.66018°W		1871–73	The church is in the grounds of the former Whittingham Hospital. It was designed by Henry Littler, and is in sandstone with a slate roof. The church consists of a nave with a clerestory, a west narthex, aisles, a chancel with a round apse, and a steeple at the junction of the north aisle, nave and chancel. The steeple has a two-stage tower; the bottom stage is square, the top stage is octagonal, and this is surmounted by an octagonal spire with a weathervane in the form of a cockerel. In the centre of the clerestory is a large gabletted wheel window.	II

== Notes and references ==
Notes

Citations

Sources

- Hartwell, Clare; Pevsner, Nikolaus (2009) [1969], Lancashire: North, The Buildings of England, New Haven and London: Yale University Press, ISBN 978-0-300-12667-9
- Historic England, "Stump Cross, Whittingham (1165108)", National Heritage List for England
- Historic England, "Bottoms Farmhouse, Whittingham (1165133)", National Heritage List for England
- Historic England, "Dun Cow Rib Farmhouse with wall enclosing garden, Whittingham (1073518)", National Heritage List for England
- Historic England, "Chingle Old Hall (with bridge over moat), Whittingham (1073521)", National Heritage List for England
- Historic England, "Chingle Hall moated site, Whittingham (1011878)", National Heritage List for England
- Historic England, "Whittingham Hall, Whittingham (1073519)", National Heritage List for England
- Historic England, "Barn circa 25 metres east of Slaters Farmhouse, Whittingham (1165198)", National Heritage List for England
- Historic England, "Sudell House Farmhouse, Whittingham (1073514)", National Heritage List for England
- Historic England, "Pigot House, Whittingham (1073515)", National Heritage List for England
- Historic England, "Pudding Pie Nook, Whittingham (1165174)", National Heritage List for England
- Historic England, "Ashes Farmhouse with wall surrounding front garden, Whittingham (1073517)", National Heritage List for England
- Historic England, "Slaters Farmhouse, Whittingham (1073520)", National Heritage List for England
- Historic England, "Albin House, Whittingham (1361666)", National Heritage List for England
- Historic England, "Green Nook, Whittingham (1073516)", National Heritage List for England
- Historic England, "Gate Piers circa 50 metres east of Green Nook, Whittingham (1165161)", National Heritage List for England
- Historic England, "Back Lane Farmhouse and adjoining barn, Whittingham (1317459)", National Heritage List for England
- Historic England, "Bushells Arms, Whittingham (1317445)", National Heritage List for England
- Historic England, "Church of St. John in grounds of Whittingham Hospital, Whittingham (1165188)", National Heritage List for England
- Historic England, Listed Buildings
