= Dun Cow =

Motif in English folklore

The Dun Cow is a common motif in English folklore. "Dun" is a dull shade of brownish grey.

== Dunsmore Heath ==
The Dun Cow was said to be a savage beast roaming Dunsmore Heath, an area west of Dunchurch, near Rugby in Warwickshire, which was reputedly slain by Guy of Warwick. A large narwhal tusk is still exhibited at Warwick Castle as one of the ribs of the Dun Cow. The fable held that the cow belonged to a giant, and was kept on Mitchell's Fold (middle fold), Shropshire. Its milk was inexhaustible; but one day an old witch who had filled her pail, wanted to fill her riddle (sieve) as well. This so enraged the animal that she broke loose from the fold and wandered to Dunsmore Heath, where she was slain by Guy of Warwick.

Isaac Taylor, in his Words and Places (p. 269), says the dun cow is a corruption of the Dena Gau (Danish region) in the neighbourhood of Warwick, with Gau in German meaning "region or country". If this explanation is correct, the great achievement of Guy of Warwick may have been a victory over the Danes, and taking from them their settlement near Warwick.

== Whittingham ==
A similar legend applies to Dun Cow Rib Farm in Halfpenny Lane, Whittingham, Lancashire, just outside the town of Longridge. Embedded in its wall is a large rib, supposedly from a giant dun cow that gave milk freely to all comers, but died of shock when an old witch asked it to fill a riddle instead of a pail. An alternative legend claims that the giant cow's milk saved the local inhabitants from the Plague and that it was buried at nearby Cow Hill, near Grimsargh. It was also claimed that the cow would quench its thirst at "Nick's Water-Pot", a well on the summit of Parlick hill. In reality, the rib is probably from a whale or Bronze Age aurochs.

== Durham ==
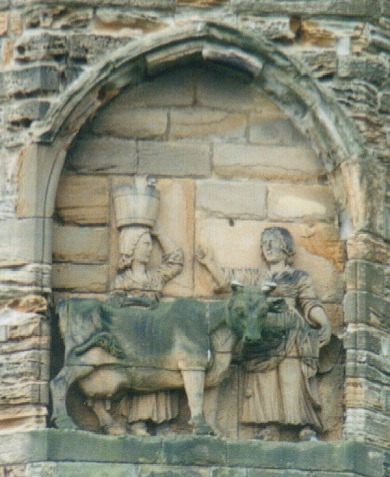
Legend of founding of Durham

Local legend states that the city of Durham was founded in 995 AD by divine intervention. The 12th-century chronicler Symeon of Durham recounts in his Libellus de exordio atque procurso istius, hoc est Dunhelmensis that, after wandering in the north, Saint Cuthbert's bier came to a miraculous halt at the hill of Warden Law and, despite the effort of the congregation, would not move. Aldhun, Bishop of Chester-le-Street and leader of the order, decreed a holy fast of three days, accompanied by prayers to the saint. Bede recounts that during this fast Saint Cuthbert appeared to the monk Eadmer with instructions that the coffin should be taken to Dun Holm.

After Eadmer’s revelation, Aldhun found that he was able to move the bier, but did not know where Dun Holm was. By chance later that day, the monks came across a milkmaid at Mount Joy who stated that she was seeking her lost dun cow which she had last seen at Dun Holm. The monks, realising that this was a sign from the saint, followed her. They settled at a "wooded hill-island formed by a tight gorge-like meander of the River Wear". When they arrived at the destination, they erected the vestiges of Durham Cathedral, a "modest building" none of which survives today, having been supplanted by the Norman structure. Symeon states that this was the first building in the city.

== Bristol ==
A tourist guide from 1923 states that:

In the glorious church of St Mary Redcliffe ... may still be seen the "Dun Cow" bone, the rib of a cow whale, now the only remaining trophy of Cabot's expedition of 1497, but for a considerable period regarded as part of the body of George of Warwick.

== Anne Boleyn ==
George Cavendish, the biographer of Cardinal Wolsey, described carved and painted royal heraldic beasts in a garden at Richmond Palace. Wolsey said a dun cow (referring to a badge of the Earldom of Richmond or Warwick) was also found in the heraldry of Thomas Boleyn and was a portent of the relationship of Anne Boleyn and Henry VIII.

== Public houses ==
There are many public houses in the United Kingdom called The Dun Cow, including one on High Street West in Sunderland, beside the Sunderland Empire Theatre.

A pub called The Dun Cow in Sedgefield, County Durham, was visited jointly by British Prime Minister Tony Blair and American President George W. Bush in 2003.

The Dun Cow, Shrewsbury, is one of the oldest pubs in the UK, built by Rodger De Montgomery, first Earl of Shrewsbury circa 1085 as a hostel for the skilled masons and master builders brought in to oversee the construction of St Peter and St Paul's (later known as Shrewsbury Abbey).

== Songs ==
A British music hall song, "When the Old Dun Cow Caught Fire" (also known as "The Old Dun Cow"), refers to a pub named the Dun Cow, which catches on fire in the beginning of the song. The singer's friends, most notably a man named Brown, decide to raid the Dun Cow's cellar for alcohol and end up heavily intoxicated, partaking in shenanigans such as trying to prevent the firefighters (implied to also be seeking alcohol) from entering the cellar, washing their clothing in a tub of port wine (or stale beer in some versions), and using their slacks to nail up a makeshift roof after the pub partially collapses.

== See also ==
- Akabeko
- Auðumbla
- The Book of the Dun Cow (1978), a fantasy novel by Walter Wangerin Jr.
- Buwch Frech, a cow in Welsh folklore
- Glas Gaibhnenn, a cow in Irish folklore.
- Lebor na hUidre (The Book of the Dun Cow), a 12th-century manuscript in Irish
- Quinotaur
