= Listed buildings in Goosnargh =

Goosnargh is a civil parish in the City of Preston, Lancashire, England. It contains 49 listed buildings that are recorded in the National Heritage List for England. Of these, four are at Grade II*, the middle grade, and the others are at Grade II, the lowest grade. The parish contains the villages of Inglewhite and Whitechapel, and part of the village of Goosnargh, but is otherwise completely rural. The listed buildings are mainly houses and associated structures, farmhouses, and farm buildings. The other listed buildings include churches, cross bases, sundials, a public house, and a school.

== Key ==
Grade	Criteria
II*	Particularly important buildings of more than special interest
II	Buildings of national importance and special interest

== Buildings ==
Name and location	Photograph	Date	Notes	Grade
St Mary's Church; 53.82662°N 2.67077°W		Late medieval	The oldest material in the church is in the north aisle. The church was enlarged in the late 16th century, restored in 1868–1869 by Paley and Austin, and restored again in 1895. It is in sandstone with a slate roof, and consists of a nave, aisles, a south porch, a chancel, and a west tower. The tower has three stages, a southeast stair turret, a west doorway, clock faces, and an embattled parapet. The windows vary, and there are dormers on the roof.	II*
Preaching cross base 53.82665°N 2.67044°W	—	Late medieval (probable)	The base of the former preaching cross stands outside St Mary's Church. It consists of a sandstone block about 1 metre (3 ft 3 in) square and 0.5 metres (1 ft 8 in) high. The block has chamfered corners, and there is a large square hole on the top.	II
Wayside cross base 53.83430°N 2.65836°W	—	Late medieval (probable)	The base of the former wayside cross stands in a hedge by the side of a lane. It is in sandstone and consists of a cubic block with a recess in the upper surface.	II
White Lee Cross; 53.88000°N 2.67406°W	—	Late medieval (probable)	The base of a former wayside cross standing in a hedge by the side of a road. It is in sandstone and consists of a slightly rounded block with a square recess in the top.	II
Blake Hall Farmhouse; 53.83901°N 2.70519°W	—	16th century	The house is in roughcast brick with stone quoins and a slate roof. It has two storeys and is in a T-shaped plan, with a single-bay hall range and a two-bay cross wing. The windows are mullioned. Inside is a large bressumer.	II
Farm building, Church House Farm; 53.82673°N 2.66740°W	—	1589 (possible)	The original purpose is not known, and it has later been used as a farm building. It is partly in brick on a sandstone plinth, and partly in stone with quoins, and has a tile roof. There are two storeys and three bays. It contains mullioned windows, Tudor arched doorways, some of which have been altered, and on the gables are obelisk finials.	II
Scotch Green Farmhouse and farm buildings 53.85923°N 2.69997°W	—	Early 17th century (or earlier)	The farmhouse has an integral shippon and stable, and a granary added in the 18th century. It is timber-framed with sandstone cladding, and has a corrugated iron roof. The building has five bays (the house having three bays), and is in 1 !/2 storeys. There is a variety of windows, including dormers. Inside the building are three full crucks, and in the house is an inglenook and a bressumer.	II*
Barn, Whinneyclough Farm; 53.84794°N 2.65622°W	—	1659	A sandstone barn with quoins and a slate roof, in six bays and with outshuts. It contains a porch to the wagon entrance, mullioned windows, and a Tudor arched doorway with a chamfered surround and a lintel containing an inscribed panel. There are finials on the south gable.	II*
Ashes Farmhouse; 53.86290°N 2.66210°W	—	17th century	The farmhouse was extended in the 18th century, and the front was rebuilt in the 20th century. It is in brick with stone quoins and a slate roof. It consists of a three-bay front range, with two rear wings, the left wing being the oldest part. The front is symmetrical with two storeys, and has a doorway with long-and-short jambs, a moulded surround, and a large stepped tympanum containing a crude carving of a putto. The windows are modern casements.	II
Bullsnape Hall; 53.85758°N 2.65165°W	—	17th century	Originally a manor house, it is in brick, partly rendered, with some sandstone and with a slate roof. The house has an F-shaped plan with a hall range and a cross wing, and is in three storeys. On the front is three-storey combined gabled porch and stair turret. Most of the windows are mullioned or mullioned and transomed, with some windows replaced by casements. Inside are back-to-back inglenooks with bressumers.	II
Fir Tree Farmhouse; 53.85296°N 2.65934°W		17th century	A brick house with a roughcast front, and a slate roof. It has two storeys and three-bays, with a gabled two-storey porch and stair turret on the front. The doorway has a moulded surround and a shaped lintel. The windows have been altered into casements. Inside are back-to-back inglenooks and bressumers.	II
Higher Crombleholme Farmhouse; 53.87351°N 2.66426°W	—	17th century	A stone house with slate roofs and three bays. The original range has two storeys and an attic, and the later parallel range at the rear has two storeys; together they form a square plan. Most of the windows in the original part are mullioned with hood moulds. On the front is a single-storey gabled porch.	II
Barn near Higher Stanalee Cottage; 53.87119°N 2.68370°W	—	17th century (probable)	The barn is cruck framed, encased in sandstone cladding, and has a corrugated iron roof over thatch. It has three bays and a lean-to extension at the right. The barn contains two wagon doorways, other doorways, and windows. Inside are two full cruck trusses.	II
St Francis' Church, presbytery and school 53.84115°N 2.65263°W		17th century	The buildings are in sandstone with slate roofs, and the church and presbytery are stuccoed. The Roman Catholic church is dated 1835 and has a simple rectangular plan, with four bays, round-headed windows, and a bellcote. The presbytery to the north, originally a 17th-century farmhouse, has two storeys and three bays, a stair turret, and sash windows. Inside are back-to-back inglenook fireplaces. The school to the north, has five bays.	II
White Lee Farmhouse; 53.87969°N 2.67867°W	—	17th century	A sandstone house with quoins and a slate roof. It is in two storeys with attics, and has roughly a T-shaped plan, consisting of a two-bay hall range with a cross wing to the right. Above the doorway is a lintel inscribed with a cross, and the original windows are mullioned.	II
Brook House Farmhouse and barn 53.83864°N 2.65483°W	—	1666	The farmhouse and barn have been converted into a house. The building is in sandstone, partly stuccoed, with quoins and a slate roof. It has two storeys and a four-bay front. On the front are a doorway, mullioned windows, and a wagon entrance with a segmental head.	II
Inglewhite Cross; 53.85397°N 2.69045°W		1675	A market cross in sandstone that was restored in 1911. It stands on a hexagonal plinth of five steps, and has a chamfered hexagonal base. It has a shaft, octagonal at the bottom and circular above. Standing on the cap is a weathervane surmounted by a figure wearing a Carolean costume.	II
Th' Owd Haystacks and Willow Barn; 53.85858°N 2.67146°W	—	Late 17th century	A barn in sandstone and brick with a corrugated sheet roof in seven bays. It contains a wagon entrance with long-and-short jambs, and ventilation slits on three levels. In the west gable wall are three doorways with Tudor arched lintels, two of which have been altered.	II
Threlfall's Farmhouse; 53.82729°N 2.69510°W	—	Late 17th century (probable)	A farmhouse later converted into a farmhouse and cottage. It is in rendered brick and a slate roof. There is a three-bay part in two storeys, and a single-bay single-storey part to the left. The windows are horizontally-sliding sashes, and at the rear is a mullioned stairlight. Inside are back-to-back inglenooks, and bressumers.	II
White Hill Farmhouse; 53.86152°N 2.63672°W	—	Late 17th century	The farmhouse is in sandstone with a plinth and quoins, it is partly rendered, and has a slate roof. The house has a T-shaped plan, with a hall and cross wing, and is in two storeys with attics. On the front is a two-storey porch with a Tudor arched outer doorway, and a hood mould with a panel containing a coat of arms. Some of the windows are mullioned, one is transomed, and others are sashes.	II
Lower Fairhurst Farmhouse; 53.86092°N 2.69203°W	—	1678	The house is in two parts, the later part dating from the 18th century. Both parts are in sandstone with a slate roof. The earlier part has a single storey, the remains of mullioned windows, and a doorway with an inscribed lintel. Inside is an inglenook and a bressumer. The later part has two storeys and three bays, a moulded doorway, and sash windows.	II
Brook Farmhouse; 53.83881°N 2.65797°W	—	1684 (or earlier)	A sandstone house that is mainly roughcast and rendered, and has a slate roof. There are three bays and two storeys. On the front is a two-storey porch that has a doorway with a chamfered surround and a shaped lintel inscribed with initials and the date. The windows on the front are sashes. Inside the house a partition wall incorporates part of a cruck truss.	II
Wood Fold Farmhouse; 53.87391°N 2.65822°W	—	1696	The farmhouse is in sandstone with quoins and a slate roof. It has two storeys and three bays with a rear outshut. It has a moulded doorway with a shaped inscribed lintel. The windows have been altered but one mullion remains. Inside is an inglenook and a bressumer.	II
Old Dog and Partridge; 53.89025°N 2.64518°W	—	c. 1700	Originally an inn, later converted into a house. It is in stuccoed sandstone with quoins and a slate roof. The building consists of a three-bay house with a single-bay stable to the left. On the front is gabled wooden porch and casement windows. A flight of external steps leads up to a first floor doorway in the stable. At the rear are mullioned windows.	II
Whinneyclough Farmhouse; 53.84756°N 2.65660°W	—	1706	The farmhouse was extended with a rear wing in 1757. It is in sandstone, mainly roughcast, and has quoins and a slate roof. The older part has two storeys and an attic, and is in three bays. The doorway has a moulded surround, and above it is a panel carved with a coat of arms. The windows are mullioned. The wing has two bays has a variety of windows.	II
Fellside Farmhouse; 53.88263°N 2.67346°W	—	1707	A sandstone house with quoins and a slate roof in two storeys. The doorway has a shaped lintel with raised lettering forming initials and the date. The windows have three lights and are mullioned. Inside is a wattle and daub partition.	II
Isles Field Farmhouse; 53.85249°N 2.66841°W	—	1709	A rendered brick house with sandstone quoinss and a slate roof. It has two storeys and a symmetrical two-bay front. In the centre is a doorway with a moulded surround and a shaped inscribed lintel. The windows on the front are sashes, and there are sliding sashes on the sides. At the rear is a projecting staircase with a stairlight.	II
Bushell's Hospital; 53.82623°N 2.66996°W		1722	Initially a country house, converted into a hospital in about 1745, and later enlarged. It is in stone with a slate roof, it has three storeys, and is in Baroque style. It has a symmetrical front of nine bays, the central five bays projecting forward with two pediments each containing a cartouche, and these are flanked by two-bay wings. The central doorway has a moulded surround, with engaged ionic columns, and an entablature with an open segmental pediment containing a cartouche. The windows are sashes, and there are bay windows on the front.	II*
Lower Stanalee Farmhouse; 53.87104°N 2.68555°W	—	Early 18th century (probable)	The house was altered in 1769, and is in sandstone with quoins and a slate roof. There are two storeys and four bays, one of which was added later. Most of the windows are sashes, and others that were originally mullioned have been altered. The doorways have also been altered.	II
Manor House Farmhouse and barn 53.85494°N 2.68981°W	—	1726	The barn and house are in sandstone with a slate roof. The house is roughcast, in two storeys, and has an L-shaped plan with a cross wing. In the angle is a modern glazed porch, and the windows are 20th-century sashes. The barn is attached to the left and has an inscribed datestone and a variety of openings.	II
New House Farmhouse; 53.84268°N 2.65591°W	—	1733	The house is in brick with some sandstone, and has stone quoins, a sandstone plinth, and a slate roof. There are two storeys with a cellar, and a three-bay front. On the front is a stone porch with a pediment, above which is an inscribed datestone. At the rear are mullioned windows to the cellar and pantry.	II
Fell Side Farmhouse; 53.86709°N 2.66185°W	—	Early to mid 18th century	The house is in stuccoed sandstone with a slate roof, and has two storeys. The doorway has a plain surround, and above it is a datestone. The windows are mullioned. At the rear is a single-storey lean-to extension.	II
St James' Church; 53.86600°N 2.67171°W		1738	The church was extended in 1818, the chancel and a new roof were added in about 1890, followed by a south porch in 1930. It is in sandstone with quoins and a slate roof with stone copings. On the west gable is a bellcote surmounted by an obelisk finial with consoles. The west front contains mullioned windows, and the other windows are round-headed. Inside is a hammerbeam roof and a low semicircular chancel arch.	II
Sundial; 53.86593°N 2.67161°W		1745	The sundial is in the churchyard of St James' Church. It is in sandstone, and has a hollowed circular base, a baluster-shaped pedestal, and a moulded cap. On the top is a brass plate and a triangular gnomon.	II
Wall, gates and gate piers, Bushell Hospital; 53.82604°N 2.66998°W	—	18th century	The wall and gate piers are in sandstone. The wall is about 1 metre (3 ft 3 in) high, with chamfered coping. The piers are square and rusticated. The pair flanking the main entrance are about 3 metres (9.8 ft) high with urn finials. To the right and flanking two other entrances are smaller piers with pyramidal roofs. The gates are in cast iron.	II
Cringle Brooks Farm; 53.85425°N 2.69062°W	—	18th century	A house in rendered roughcast stone with a slate roof. There are two storeys and two bays, with a single-storey gabled porch. The porch has an open doorway and stone benches inside. The windows are sashes.	II
Longley Hall and garden wall 53.84769°N 2.69547°W	—	Mid 18th century (probable)	A farmhouse containing earlier fabric, in brick with a sandstone plinth and quoins and a slate roof. The house has two storeys with attics, and two bays with outshuts. On the garden front is a gabled single-storey porch. Most of the windows are sashes. The garden wall is in brick with sandstone coping, and it encloses two sides of the garden.	II
Sundial; 53.82651°N 2.67076°W		18th century	The sundial is in the churchyard of St Mary's Church. It is in sandstone, and stands on two circular steps. The sundial consists of a vase-shaped pedestal, and it has a moulded cap with egg-and-dart decoration. On the top is a worn brass plate, and the gnomon is missing.	II
Brook Cottage; 53.83702°N 2.65720°W	—	1769	A farmhouse that was extended in the early 19th century. It is in sandstone with slate roofs, the later part being higher. Both parts are in two storeys and two bays. The earlier part has quoins, a gable to the road, and a datestone. The windows in the later part are sashes, and above the door is a semicircular fanlight with a Tuscan architrave.	II
Broadhead Farmhouse and barn 53.88443°N 2.64660°W	—	1770	The house and barn are in sandstone with slate roofs. The house has two storeys and two bays. The windows to the left of the doorway are sashes, and to the right is a casement window and a mullioned window containing sashes. On the front is a datestone. The barn to the right contains a wagon entrance with a segmental head, a doorway and a window.	II
The Cottage; 53.84402°N 2.65240°W	—	1771	A sandstone house with quoins and a slate roof in two storeys. The original house has two bays, and a further bay was added to the right in the 20th century. The original part is symmetrical with a central gabled porch and doorway and mullioned windows. Above the porch is a datestone.	II
Eaves Green Farmhouse and garden wall 53.83311°N 2.66159°W	—	Late 18th century	The farmhouse is in brick on a stone plinth with stone dressings and a slate roof. It has three storeys and a symmetrical three-bay front. There is a central doorway with a moulded segmental canopy. The windows contains altered glazing. The garden is surrounded by a stone wall with rounded coping, and contains a gateway with piers.	II
Grapes Inn; 53.82602°N 2.67114°W		Late 18th century (probable)	A public house in stuccoed stone with quoins and a slate roof. It has two storeys and five bays in three parts. The windows vary, some of them being sashes, and the doorway has a gabled wooden porch.	II
Woods Heys Farmhouse and barn 53.83808°N 2.65514°W	—	Late 18th century	The house and barn are in sandstone with a slate roof. The house has two storeys with an attic, and a symmetrical two-bay front, with extensions on the left and at the rear. The central doorway has a modern glazed porch, and most of the windows are sashes. The barn to the right has three bays and a large segmental-headed wagon entrance.	II
Ye Horns Inn; 53.84705°N 2.64725°W		1784	A public house in sandstone with applied mock timbering and a slate roof. There are two storeys with attics. The main block has two bays and a central doorway with a canopy above which is a datestone, and a lower bay to the right. On the right side is a canted bay window and a doorway, and a projecting bay to the right. All the window are 20th-century replacements. Internal fittings dating from the early 20th century have been retained, including a snug behind the bar counter.	II
Westfield Farmhouse; 53.83228°N 2.70057°W	—	1795	A sandstone house with quoins and a slate roof. It has two storeys and two bays, and a doorway with a plain surround and a pitched slab canopy. Above the doorway is a large decorative datestone, and the windows are sashes. On the left return is a porch, on the right side is a single-story washhouse, and at the rear is a stair window.	II
Inglewhite Congregational Church; 53.85272°N 2.68935°W		1826	The church is in sandstone, partly rendered, with quoins and a slate roof. It has a rectangular plan, with an extension on the side. There is a gabled symmetrical front that has a round-headed doorway with an inscription in the head, imposts, and a fanlight. There are two round-headed windows above, and larger round-headed windows on the sides and rear.	II
Goosnargh (Oliverson's) CE School; 53.82639°N 2.67143°W		1839	The school is in stone with a slate roof and has a single storey. On the east side is a moulded doorway, rectangular windows, and a plain parapet. There are small pinnacles on the gables, and an inscribed tablet on the south gable end.	II
Obelisk; 53.82622°N 2.67041°W	—	1841	The obelisk is in the garden of Bushell's Hospital. It is in sandstone, and consists of a square inscribed pedestal with a moulded base and cap. Standing on this is an obelisk with a moulded base and a ball at each corner.	II
