= The Green Man at Inglewhite =

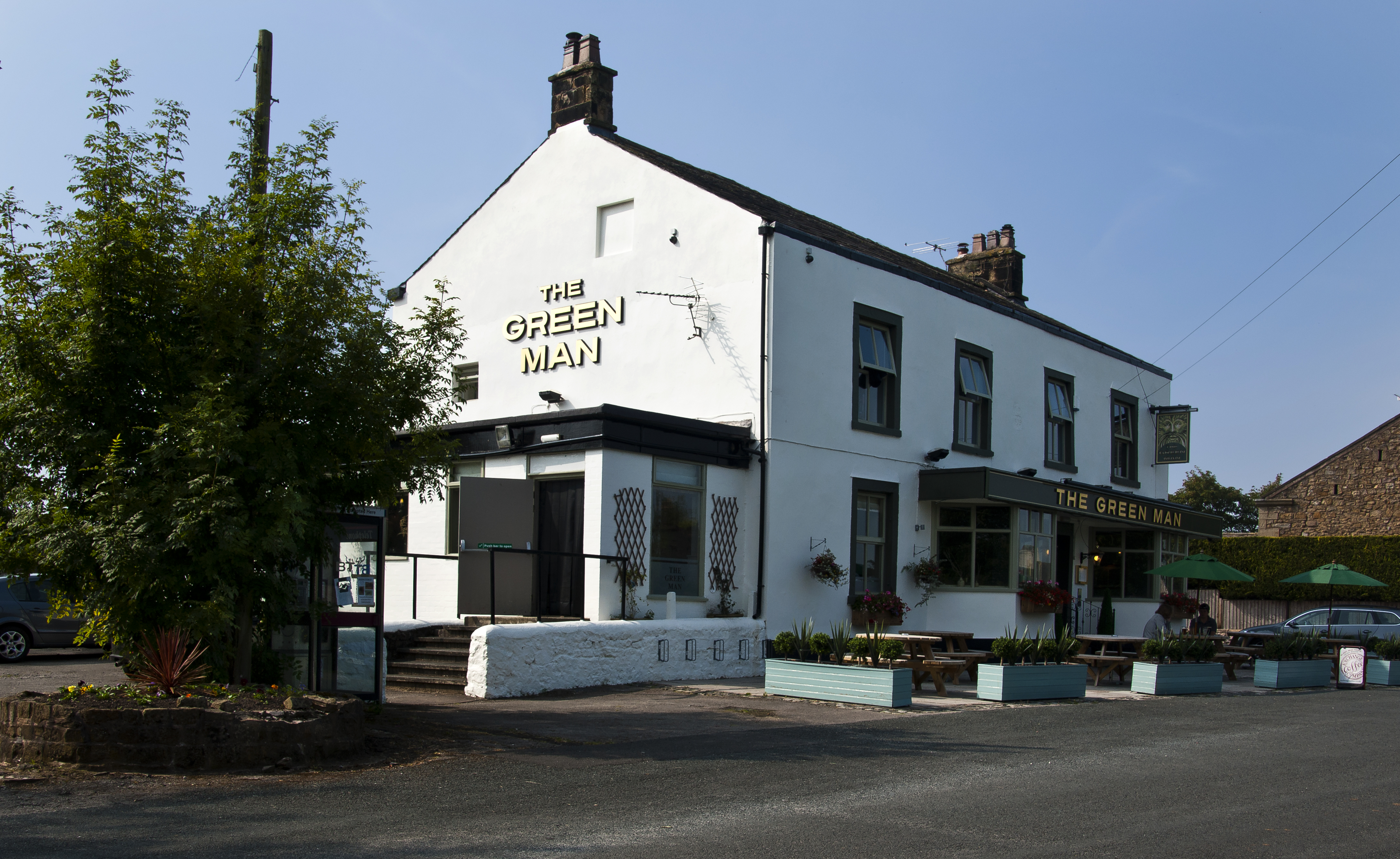
- The Green Man in 2014

- Location within the City of Preston district

General information
- Type: Public house
- Location: Silk Mill Lane, Inglewhite, Lancashire, England
- Coordinates: 53.853586°N 2.689769°W
- Opened: 1809 (217 years ago)
- Landlord: Mick O'Hara

Technical details
- Floor count: 2

Website
- thegreenmanatinglewhite.co.uk

The Green Man at Inglewhite is a public house in Inglewhite, Lancashire, England. The pub was established in 1809.

In 1986, Inglewhite was designated a conservation area. It was appraised again a decade later. A 2011 review "re-evaluates its special architectural and historic interest in line with the requirements of the Town & Country (Listed Buildings and Conservation Areas) Act 1990 using the latest best practice guidance produced by English Heritage." In 2011, Preston City Council designated The Green Man one of eight sites of special interest in the village.

The building is also notable for its use of the now-rare Westmorland slate on its roof.

== Gallery ==
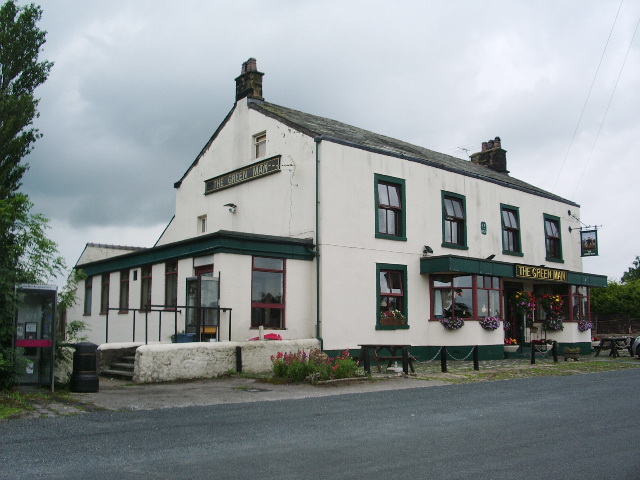
A 2008 view
