= Whitechapel, Lancashire =

Hamlet in Lancashire, England

Coordinates: 53.866°N 2.673°W

Whitechapel
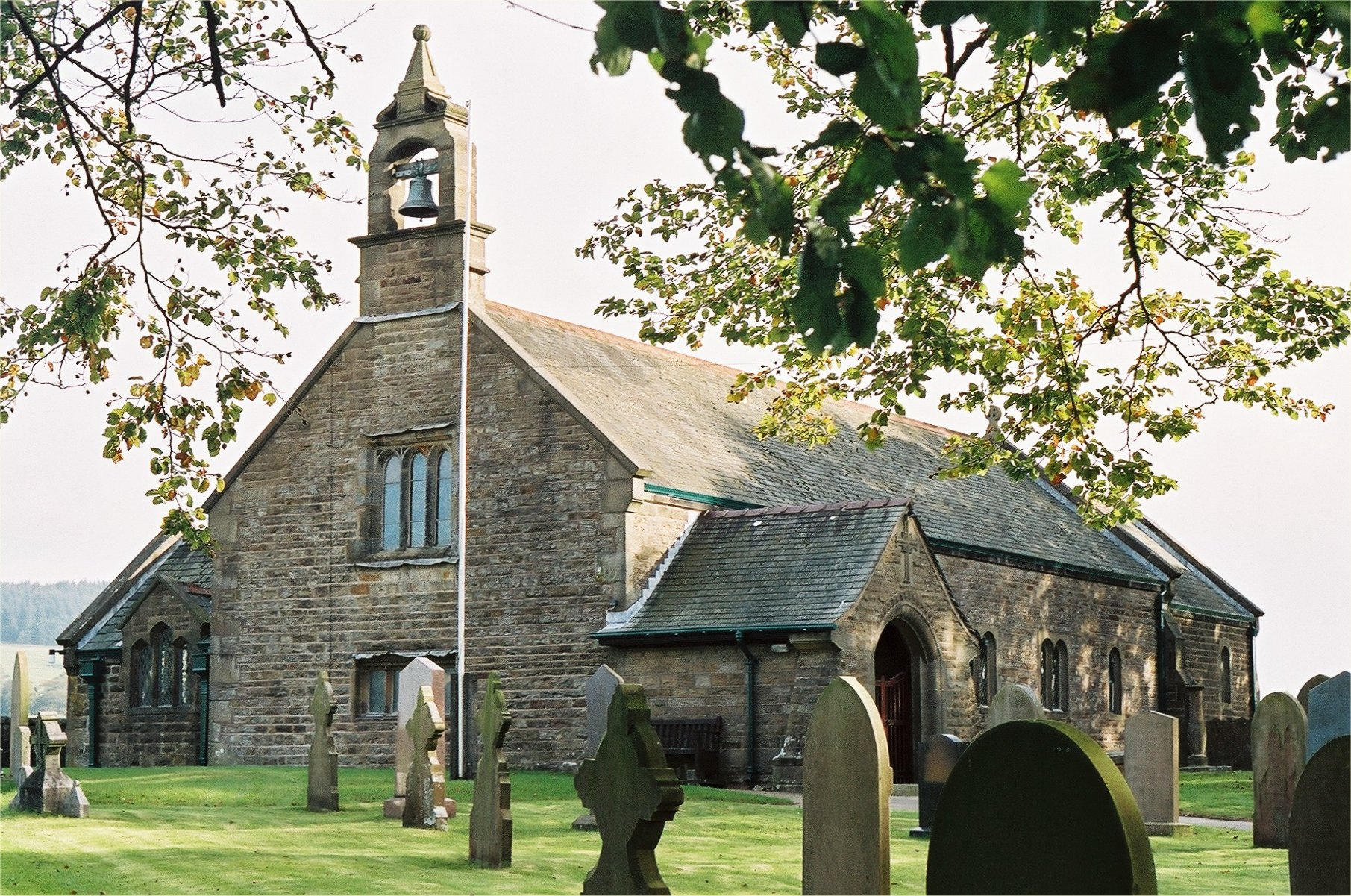
- St James' Church

- Location in the City of Preston district Location in the Forest of Bowland Location within Lancashire
- OS grid reference: SD557413
- Civil parish: Goosnargh
- District: Preston
- Shire county: Lancashire
- Region: North West
- Country: England
- Sovereign state: United Kingdom
- Post town: PRESTON
- Postcode district: PR3
- Dialling code: 01995
- Police: Lancashire
- Fire: Lancashire
- Ambulance: North West
- UK Parliament: Ribble Valley

Whitechapel is a tiny hamlet in the civil parish of Goosnargh in Lancashire, England. It lies on the border of the Forest of Bowland near the foot of Beacon Fell, and close to the neighbouring village of Inglewhite. Its name is marked as White Chapel on some maps.

The area was known as "Threlfall" in the Domesday Book. A tiny 27×13-foot private chapel was built for the Threlfall family in Elizabethan times, and was rebuilt as St James' Church about 1738. The churchyard contains a sundial dated 1745 which is a Grade II listed building.

The name "Whitechapel" came into use in the early nineteenth century, named after the church. It was originally a part of Goosnargh ecclesiastical parish, but acquired independent parish status in 1846.

The village primary school originated in 1705, within the church, acquiring its own building in 1810.

On Pancake Day the children of Whitechapel, Inglewhite and the surrounding area keep alive an age-old tradition that was once more widespread in the Goosnargh, Garstang and Fylde areas of Lancashire. They visit local households and ask "please a pancake", to be rewarded with oranges or sweets. It is thought the tradition arose when farm workers visited the wealthier farm and manor owners to ask for pancakes or pancake fillings. In 1888, Richard Cookson wrote, "The children go from house to house and are treated with ginger-bread, toffies and other sweet meats."

WICE (Whitechapel and Inglewhite Community Enterprises) is a community organisation to enable a sustainable and resilient community.

== See also ==
- Listed buildings in Goosnargh
