= Inglewhite Congregational Church =

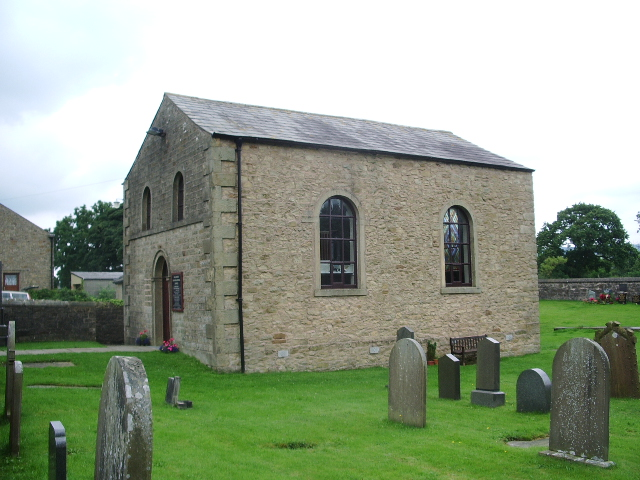
- Church from the south-west, 2008 (before an extension was added to the rear)
- Inglewhite Congregational Church
- 53°51′10″N 2°41′21″W
- OS grid reference: SD 54750 39828
- Location: Silk Mill Lane, Inglewhite, Lancashire
- Country: England

History
- Former name: Silk Mill Lane Independent Church
- Status: Open
- Founded: 1819, 207 years ago

Architecture
- Completed: 1826, 200 years ago

Inglewhite Congregational Church is a church located in the English village of Inglewhite, Lancashire. A Grade II listed building, it was constructed in 1826.

The church was founded in 1819 and was originally known as Silk Mill Lane Independent Church. It became known as a Congregational Church later in the 19th century.

The church is in sandstone, partly rendered, with quoins and a slate roof. It has a rectangular plan, with an extension on the side. There is a gabled symmetrical front that has a round-headed doorway with an inscription in the head, imposts, and a fanlight. There are two round-headed windows above, and larger round-headed windows on the sides and rear.

In 2011, Preston City Council designated the church as one of eleven buildings in the village to be sites of special interest. Another two were added in 2022. The church runs a weekly playgroup.

In 2011 the church appointed the Frank Whittle Partnership to design a £450,000 extension to accommodate its increasing congregation.

== See also ==
- Listed buildings in Goosnargh

== Sources ==
- Hartwell, Clare; Pevsner, Nikolaus (2009) [1969], Lancashire: North, The Buildings of England, New Haven and London: Yale University Press, ISBN 978-0-300-12667-9
- Historic England, "Inglewhite Congregational Church (1073546)", National Heritage List for England
