= Chingle Hall =

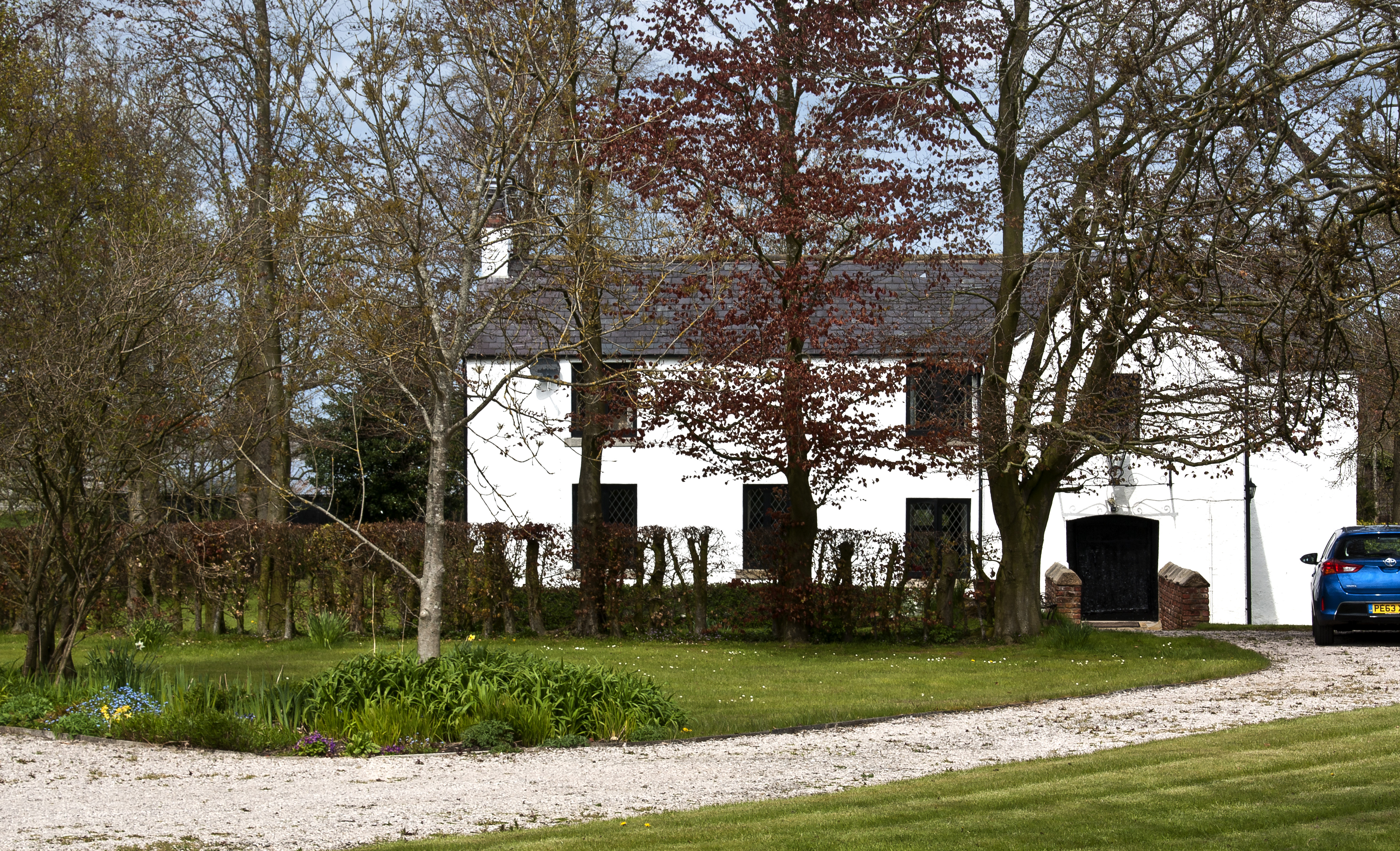

- Location within the City of Preston district
- 53.8167°N 2.6746°W
- Location: Whittingham, Preston, England
- OS grid reference: SD 55681 35812

History
- Built: 1260

Listed Building – Grade II
- Official name: Chingle Old Hall (with bridge over moat)
- Designated: 11 November 1966
- Reference no.: 1073521

Scheduled monument
- Official name: Chingle Hall moated site
- Designated: 12 November 1991
- Reference no.: 1011878

Chingle Hall is a grade II listed manor house in the township of Whittingham near Preston, England.

== History ==
Originally, the land where Chingle Hall now stands was owned by Ughtred de Singleton from around 1066. In 1260, Adam de Singleton built a small manor house known as Singleton Hall. It was surrounded by a moat and the studded oak front door was accessed via a small wooden drawbridge, which was replaced in the 16th century by a brick-built bridge. The door and bridge have survived to this day, although some of the moat has now dried up. The hall, renamed Chingle Hall, remained in the possession of the Singleton family until Eleanor Singleton, the last of the line, died in 1585. The house then passed to the Wall family through the marriage of William Wall with Anne Singleton. Their son Anthony Wall, once mayor of Preston, died there in 1601. In 1680 the house was extended westwards. The Walls owned the hall until the mid-18th century, when the house passed to a local branch of the Singleton family.

From 1794, the house was owned by the Farrington family for some hundred years before being bought by the Longton family. In 1945, the house was rented by the Howarths before they bought the property in 1960. In the 1970s, guided tours were available highlighting priest holes and paranormal activity at the hall. After Mr Howarth died, the house stood empty and was badly vandalised, until Sandra and John Coppleston-Bruce bought the house in 1986 and restored it. In February 1995, the property was bought by the Kirkhams.

The house and gardens are private property and are not open to the public.

The house was the subject of an episode of the television programme Strange but True?

== Saint John Wall ==
Some have made the claim that Saint John Wall was born in the Hall in 1620. It is unlikely that he was a member of the Preston Wall family. He became a Roman Catholic priest in 1641. Some have claimed that Chingle Hall was used as a place of worship by Catholics during the time of the Catholic Reformation when it was illegal to practice mass in Britain. In 1678 John Wall was apprehended at Rushock Court near Bromsgrove. He was taken to Worcester jail, where he was offered his life if he would forsake his religion. He declined. Brought back from Worcester, he was drawn and quartered at Redhill on 22 August 1679. His quartered body was given to his friends, and was buried in St. Oswald's churchyard. A Mr. Levison, however, allegedly acquired the martyr's head, and it was treasured by the friars at Worcester until the dissolution of that house during the French Revolution. The Franciscan nuns at Taunton claim to possess a tooth and a bone of the martyr. He was canonised by Pope Paul VI in 1970.

== See also ==
- Scheduled monuments in Lancashire
- Listed buildings in Whittingham, Lancashire
