= Ye Horns Inn =

Public house in Goosnargh, Lancashire, England

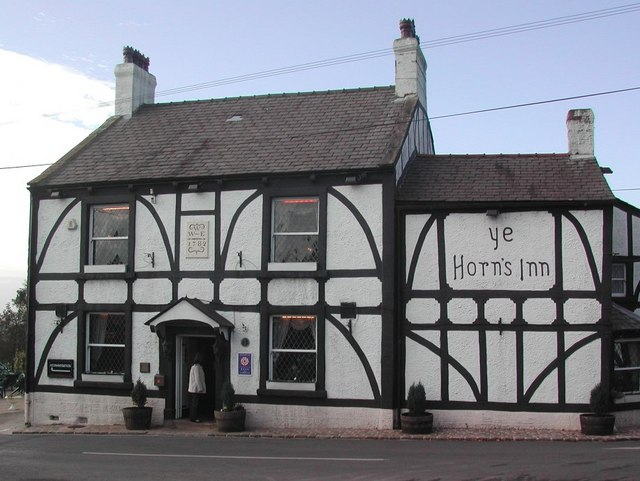
- Pictured in 2007

- Location within the City of Preston district
- Former names: Buck Horns

General information
- Type: Public house restaurant
- Location: Horns Lane, Goosnargh, Preston, Lancashire, England
- Coordinates: 53.847036°N 2.647371°W
- Completed: c. 1782

Design and construction
- Designations: Grade II Listed building

Website
- www.yehornsinn.com

Ye Horns Inn is a restaurant and public house on Horns Lane in Goosnargh parish in Lancashire, England.

Located near the Forest of Bowland, Ye Horns Inn has welcomed locals and travellers alike over the years. Originally a coaching inn called the Buck Horns, dating back to at least 1782, it was originally part of a working farm.

During the inter-war period the interior was partially refitted which coincided with render and mock timber being applied to the exterior. This, and the creation of dining rooms, is thought to be an attempt to provide an "improved" pub, popular at the time and stemming from a desire to cut back on the amount of drunkenness associated with conventional Victorian and Edwardian public houses.

The building was given Grade II listed status in January 2017 based on its architectural value, the retention of the pub's interior and the rarity interior features such as a bar counter with functioning sliding screens and a snug behind and accessed through the servery (one of only three examples known to survive in England). The snug has a baffle, a fireplace with a brick and carved wood surround, bar back shelving which may date from the 1930s, a carved settle and a panelled dado.

Its distinctive characteristics, prior to renovation 2018–2022, earned it a listing on the Campaign for Real Ale's (CAMRA) National Inventory of Historic Pub Interiors. CAMRA claims, however, that the renovations from 2018 to 2022 appear to have damaged historic parts of the interior without listed building consent.

On-site brewing began in March 2013.

== See also ==
- Listed buildings in Goosnargh
