= Inglewhite =

Coordinates: 53.854°N 2.690°W

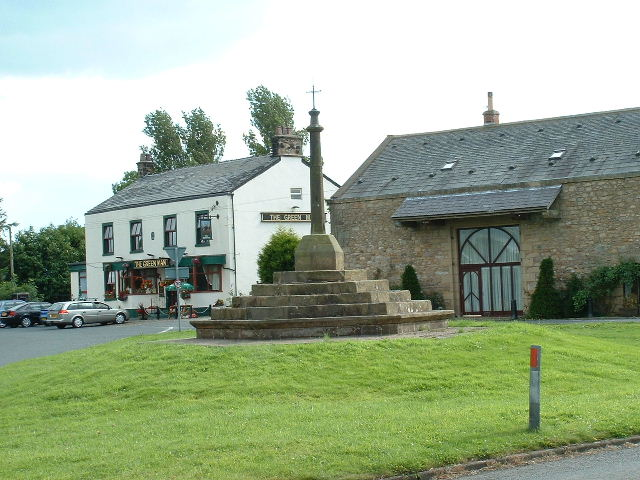
- Inglewhite cross and The Green Man public house in 2005

- Shown within the City of Preston district Location within Lancashire
- OS grid reference: SD546400
- Civil parish: Goosnargh
- District: Preston
- Shire county: Lancashire
- Region: North West
- Country: England
- Sovereign state: United Kingdom
- Post town: PRESTON
- Postcode district: PR3
- Dialling code: 01995
- Police: Lancashire
- Fire: Lancashire
- Ambulance: North West
- UK Parliament: Ribble Valley

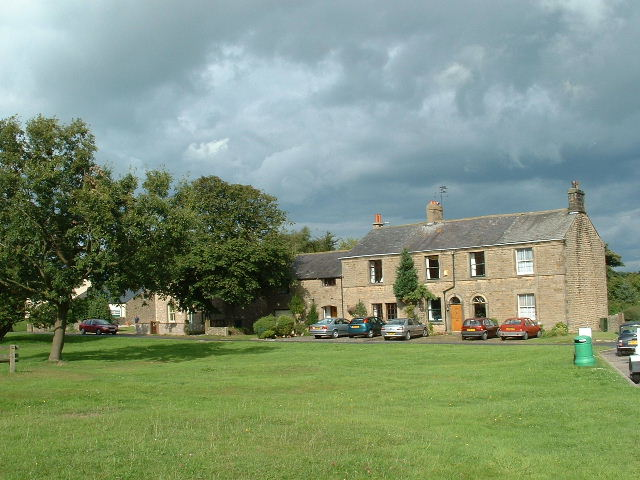
Inglewhite Green

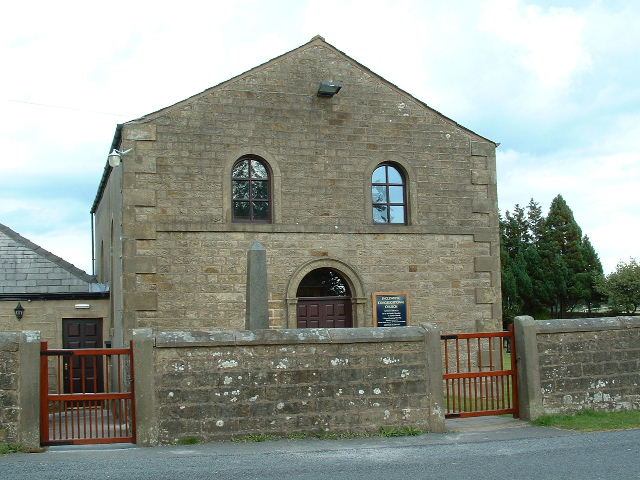
Inglewhite Congregational Church

Inglewhite is a small village in the parish of Goosnargh in Lancashire, England. It lies at the intersection of the roads from Longridge to Garstang and from Broughton to Beacon Fell.

== Toponymy ==
The origin of the name Inglewhite is uncertain. One popular interpretation is that the name means 'white fire', from the Gaelic aingeal meaning 'fire'. It is thought to refer to will-o'-the-wisps that were once prevalent on the village green.

== History ==
The road names of Button Street and Silk Mill Lane indicate industries that once thrived near the village. Inglewhite Congregational Church, on Silk Mill Lane, was founded in 1819 and constructed in 1826. The village forge, which made ammunition boxes during the World War I, closed in 1992. The building housed a café for several years but is now closed.

The parish church of St James, in the neighbouring village of Whitechapel, dates from 1738. It was enlarged in 1818 and restored in 1889 and has been a Grade II listed building since 1986. The church is part of the Fellside Team Ministry.

=== Sites of special interest ===
In 2011, Preston City Council designated eleven structures in the village as sites of special interest. Another two were added in 2022.

- Cloggers and Smithy Cottage
- Toll Bar Cottage
- Former police station
- The Green Man at Inglewhite
- Black Bull Cottage
- Bridge House Farm, farmhouse and Cottages
- Barn on the Green
- Cliftons Farm
- The Old Forge

Four of those designated are Grade II listed:

- Inglewhite Congregational Church
- Market Cross
- Cringle Brooks Farmhouse
- Manor House Farmhouse

== Amenities ==
The public houses the Queens Arms and the Black Bull closed early in the 20th century, leaving only the Green Man at Inglewhite, which was originally established in 1809.

== Community ==
Inglewhite is closely linked to the nearly village of Whitechapel. WICE (Whitechapel and Inglewhite Community Enterprises) has been formed as a community organisation to enable a sustainable and resilient community.

Wilson Fields Farm in Inglewhite is the home of Butlers' Farmhouse Cheeses.

== See also ==
- Listed buildings in Goosnargh
