= Peter Armstrong Whittle =

English antiquarian

- Born: 9 July 1789; Inglewhite
- Died: 7 January 1866 (aged 76)
- Occupation: Antiquarian

Peter Armstrong Whittle (9 July 1789 – 7 January 1866) was an English antiquarian.

== Biography ==
Whittle was born at Inglewhite in the parish of Goosnargh, Lancashire, on 9 July 1789, and was educated at the grammar schools of Goosnargh, Walton-le-Dale, and Preston. He began business as a bookseller and printer at Preston in 1810, and became an active contributor to various journals. He was intelligent but ill-educated, and his works, though not without value, abound in errors. He styled himself F.S.A., but was not a fellow of the Society of Antiquaries. In 1858, Lord Derby, as prime minister, gave him a pension of 50l. a year for ‘literary services.’ After giving up business in 1851, he lived at Bolton for some years, and then removed to Mount Vernon, Liverpool. Whittle, who was a Roman catholic, died on 7 January 1866. He married, in October 1827, Matilda Henrietta Armstrong, and had two sons: Robert Claudius, author of ‘The Wayfarer in Lancashire,’ and Henry Armstrong.

He was the author of the following local histories:

- ‘A Topographical Account, &c., of Preston,’ 1821; vol. ii. 1837, 12mo (the first volume was published under the pseudonym of ‘Marmaduke Tulket’).
- ‘Marina; or an Historical and Descriptive Account of Southport, Lytham, and Blackpool,’ Preston, 1831, 8vo (anon.).
- ‘Architectural Description of St. Ignatius's Church, Preston,’ 1833.
- ‘Description of St. Mary's Cistercian Church at Penwortham,’ 8vo.
- ‘Historical Notices of Hoghton Tower,’ 1845.
- ‘An Account of St. Marie's Chapel at Fernyhalgh,’ 1851, 8vo.
- ‘Blackburn as it is,’ 1852.
- ‘Bolton-le-Moors and the Townships in the Parish,’ Bolton, 1855, 8vo.
