= Barton, Preston =

Linear village and civil parish in the City of Preston, Lancashire, England

Coordinates: 53.830°N 2.735°W

Barton
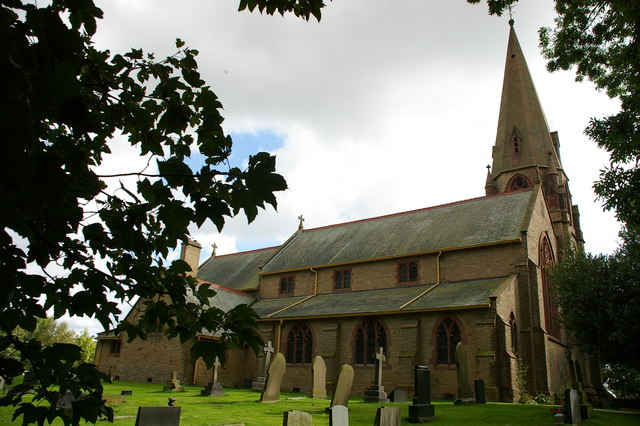
- Saint Lawrence's church

- Shown within the City of Preston district Location within Lancashire
- Area: 3.81 sq mi (9.9 km^{2}) 987.66 hectares
- Population: 1,493 (2021)
  - Density: 392/sq mi (151/km^{2})
- OS grid reference: SD516373
- Civil parish: Barton
- District: Preston
- Shire county: Lancashire
- Region: North West
- Country: England
- Sovereign state: United Kingdom
- Post town: PRESTON
- Postcode district: PR3
- Dialling code: 01772
- Police: Lancashire
- Fire: Lancashire
- Ambulance: North West
- UK Parliament: Ribble Valley

Civil parishes in the City of Preston
- Barton
- Broughton
- Goosnargh
- Grimsargh
- Haighton
- Ingol & Tanterton
- Lea
- Whittingham
- Woodplumpton

Barton is a linear village and civil parish in the City of Preston, Lancashire, England. The parish had a population of 1,493, according to the 2021 census.

== Geography ==
The village is about 6 miles (10 km) north of Preston and 2 miles (3 km) north of Broughton. The parish is bound by the A6 road to the west. A bridge carries the A6 over the West Coast Main Line railway north of the village hall. The M6 motorway also passes through the parish, splitting the village, west of the motorway, from the rest of the parish.

Barton Brook flows north east to south west through the parish and is so named from the point where Sparling Brook joins Westfield Brook south of Barton Old Hall. A marker for the parish boundary with Broughton is on the A6 at Cardwell Bridge over the brook. The bridge was rebuilt in 1921 after being damaged by floods.

Barton Grange was built as the country residence for John Healey, a local mill owner and was later the home of Levi Collison MP. In 1940 it was requisitioned by the War Office and is now a hotel.

Barton is named on the base of three milestones along the Garstang Road. One is now in Broughton after parish boundary changes. All three are listed by Historic England.

== History ==
The parish church of St Lawrence was re-built in 1895 to a design by Richard Knill Freeman. It is a Grade II listed building. It is part of the Fellside Team of parishes.

The Boar's Head public house on the Garstang Road near St Lawrence's was part of village life for two hundred years. Its external appearance was described in 1872; rails at the front, little white stones all round bordered by bright flowers, "scrupulously clean" front steps with roses blooming above, and a "fierce yet faded representation of a wild animal's head, with savage tusks, and a tongue swinging beautifully to the left". The public house closed in 2017, the building was severely damaged by a deliberately started fire two years later and demolished in 2022 to make way for a housing development.

Barton and Broughton railway station at Newsham, ¾ mile to the south of Barton, opened in 1840 and closed to passenger traffic in 1939.

== Amenities ==
Barton St Lawrence CofE Primary School is on Jepps Avenue. The village hall on the northern edge of the village was built in 1924. Barton Bowling Club and Barton and Myerscough Tennis Club each have facilities next to the hall.

== Newsham ==
Newsham was added to Barton parish in 1894; it was previously a detached part of Goosnargh parish. St Mary's Newhouse Catholic Church in Station Lane, Newsham was consecrated in 1906, the building replacing earlier ones. St Mary & St Andrew's Catholic Primary School, previously known as Newhouse School, also on Station Lane, is a 1988 amalgamation on the existing site of St Mary's with St Andrew's, Cottam. The school buildings date from 1857. A. Hewitson who wrote regular columns for the Preston Chronicle in the 1870s under the nom de plume Atticus failed to be stirred by the views from the catholic chapel, saying, "nothing very picturesque can be seen . . . ".

== Governance ==
Barton is within the City of Preston electoral ward of Preston Rural North, and the Preston Rural electoral division of Lancashire County Council. The civil parish of Barton was part of Preston Rural District throughout its existence from 1894 to 1974. In 1974 the parish became part of the Borough of Preston, which became a city in 2002.

== Transport ==
Bus services in Barton are run entirely by Stagecoach in Lancaster on 2 routes the 40/41 to Lancaster/Morecambe or Preston.

== See also ==
- Listed buildings in Barton, Preston

== Gallery ==
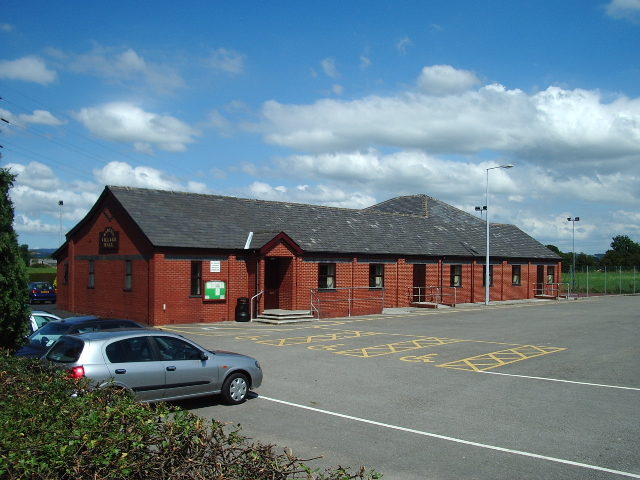
Barton Village Hall

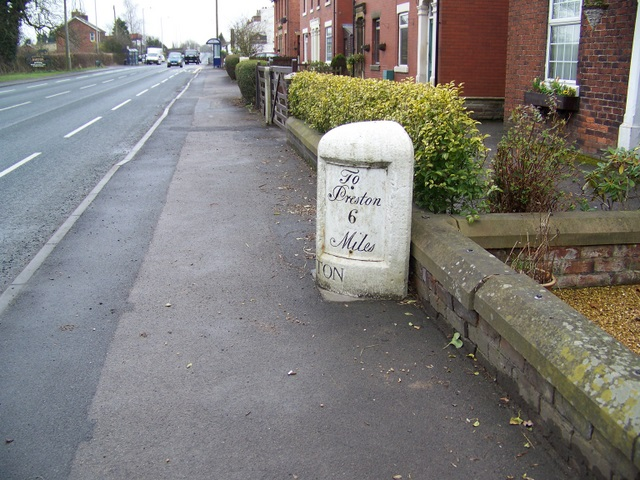
"6 miles to Preston milestone

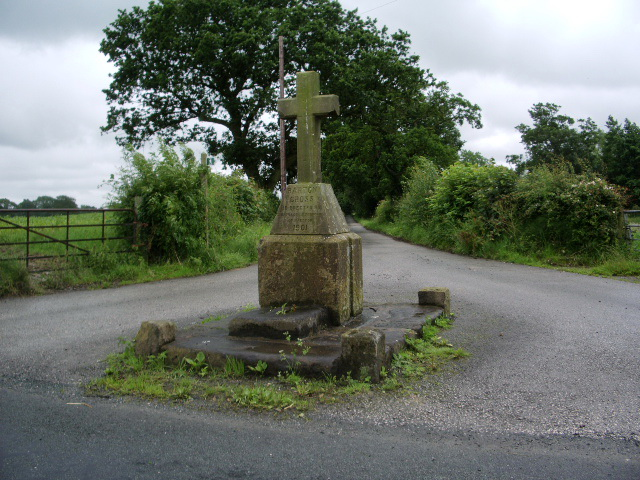
Barton Cross

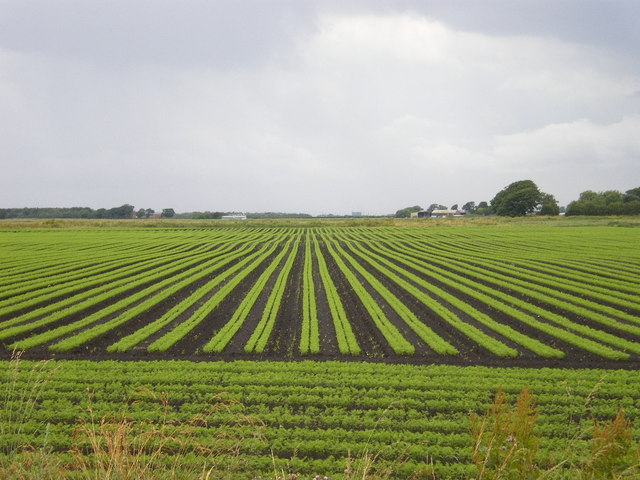
Vegetable field near Barton

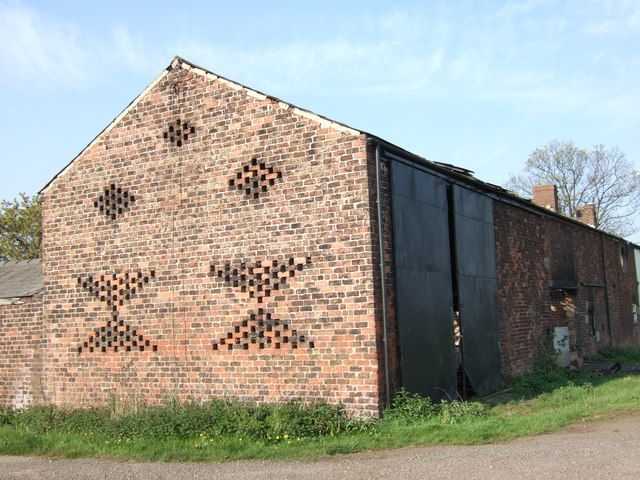
Unique style barn near Barton
