= Whittingham, Lancashire =

Parish in Lancashire, England

Coordinates: 53.817°N 2.658°W

Whittingham
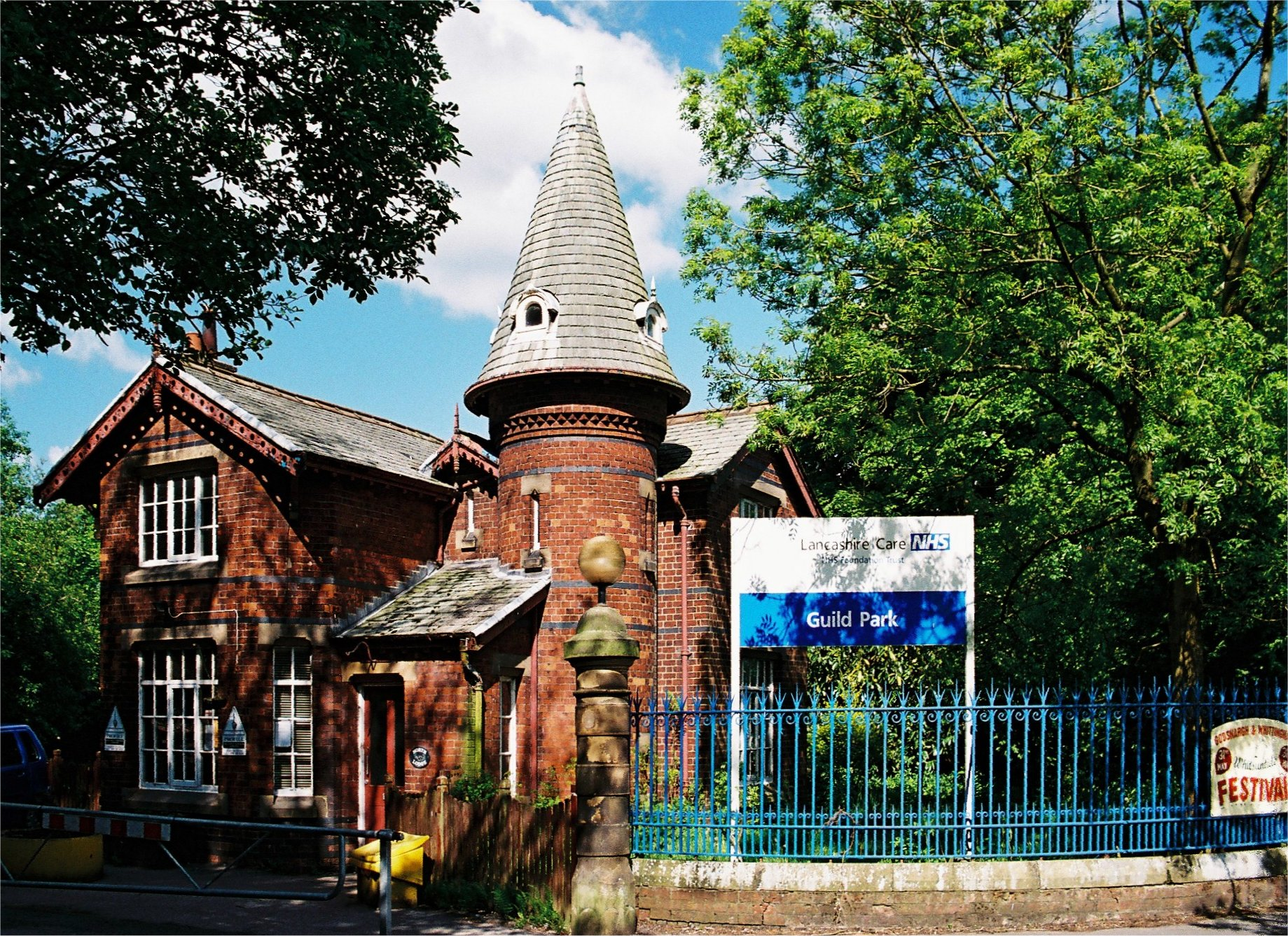
- North Lodge, the entrance to Guild Park, the grounds of the former Whittingham Hospital

- Shown within the City of Preston district Location within Lancashire
- Population: 2,027 (2011)
- OS grid reference: SD505345
- Civil parish: Whittingham
- District: Preston
- Shire county: Lancashire
- Region: North West
- Country: England
- Sovereign state: United Kingdom
- Post town: PRESTON
- Postcode district: PR3
- Dialling code: 01772
- Police: Lancashire
- Fire: Lancashire
- Ambulance: North West
- UK Parliament: Ribble Valley

Civil parishes in the City of Preston
- Barton
- Broughton
- Goosnargh
- Grimsargh
- Haighton
- Ingol & Tanterton
- Lea
- Whittingham
- Woodplumpton

Whittingham is a civil parish in the City of Preston, Lancashire, England. The parish measures 4 miles (6 km) east-to-west, from the outskirts of Longridge to the outskirts of Broughton, but only 1 mile (1½ km) north-to-south. Its population was 2,189 in 2001, reducing to 2,027 at the time of the 2011 Census. The village of Goosnargh is at its centre.

The parish once contained the largest mental hospital in England, North West England’s nuclear bunker, and, according to legend, a giant cow.

== Goosnargh and Whittingham ==
The only village of any substantial size in the parish is Goosnargh. Goosnargh is unusual because only one side of one road in the village lies within the parish boundaries of Goosnargh; almost all of the village lies within Whittingham parish.

This may explain why the village is sometimes referred to as "Goosnargh and Whittingham", as if there were two villages. Some road signs on entering the village display "Whittingham and Goosnargh". The website of the local "Goosnargh & Whittingham Whitsuntide Festival" refers to "the twin villages of Goosnargh and Whittingham". An article in a local newspaper also refers to "the villages of Whittingham and Goosnargh".

However, no modern maps show a village marked "Whittingham" and the website of Whittingham Parish Council refers only to the village of Goosnargh.

== Whittingham Hospital ==
Whittingham Hospital, whose grounds adjoin the village of Goosnargh, was founded in 1869 and grew to be the largest mental hospital in the country. The hospital pioneered the use of electroencephalograms (EEGs) and during its time it had its own church, farms, railway, telephone exchange, post office, reservoirs, gas works, brewery, orchestra, brass band, ballroom and butchers.

During the 1970s and 1980s, new drugs and therapies were introduced. Long-stay patients were returned to the community or dispersed to smaller units around Preston. The hospital eventually closed in 1995. The hospital campus is now mostly derelict awaiting redevelopment, but a psychiatric unit known as Guild Lodge still operates on part of the site.

== Cumeragh Village ==
Cumeragh Village is a hamlet that consists of houses around a square. It lies just outside the village of Goosnargh and directly opposite the main entrance to the grounds of the former Whittingham Hospital. The houses were originally built to house hospital workers.

== Notable places ==
Just outside the town of Longridge, within the parish of Whittingham, lies Halfpenny Lane locally /ˈheɪpni/ HAYP-nee, so named because of a toll charged to cattle drovers for an overnight stay. Dun Cow Rib Farm was built on the lane by Adam Hoghton in 1616, and contains embedded in its wall a large rib. According to legend, the rib came from a giant "dun cow" which roamed the area at the time of the Plague, and whose milk saved the local inhabitants, and was buried at nearby Cow Hill, near Grimsargh. An alternative legend claims that the cow gave milk freely to all comers, but died of shock when an old witch asked it to fill a riddle (sieve) instead of a pail. In reality, the rib is probably from a whale or Bronze Age aurochs. With reference to the rib from the Great Dun Cow, a rib bone was also to be found at Grimsargh Hall Farm.

Chingle Hall was built by the Singleton family and first appears by name in 1354. Whittingham Hall, half a mile to the east, was owned from medieval times by the Whittingham family, and later the Pedder family.

Between 1962 and 1991, straddling the boundary of Whittingham and Goosnargh parishes in Langley Lane, were the headquarters of the Western Region of the United Kingdom Warning and Monitoring Organisation. They were in a vast underground bunker that would have been the Northwest of England’s control centre in the event of a nuclear attack on Britain. After the collapse of the Soviet Union, the site was sold off and the above-surface buildings are now used as a veterinary centre.

Whittingham House is one of the oldest houses in the parish. It used to own 300 acres (1.2 km^{2}) of land, which was subsequently divided up. In the twentieth century the house was about to be converted into flats, but one of the wings was burnt down, leading to the withdrawal of the plans.

== Administration ==
The parish was part of Preston Rural District throughout its existence from 1894 to 1974. In 1974 the parish became part of the Borough of Preston, which became a city in 2002.

== See also ==
- Listed buildings in Whittingham, Lancashire

== Bibliography ==
- Dewhurst, A (1985) Times Past in Goosnargh, Countryside Publications, Chorley, ISBN 0-86157-183-5
- Hunt, D. (2003) The Wharncliffe Companion to Preston — An A to Z of Local History, Wharncliffe Books, Barnsley, ISBN 1-903425-79-4.
- Pattinson, M. (ed.) (1999) Longridge — The Way we Were, Hudson History of Settle, ISBN 0-9533643-4-8
- Rothwell, C. (1995) Around Garstang, Alan Sutton Publishing, Stroud, ISBN 0-7509-0870-X
- Till, J. M. (1993) A History of Longridge and its People, Carnegie Publishing, Preston, ISBN 0-948789-92-1
