= Listed buildings in Barton, Preston =

Barton is a civil parish in the City of Preston, Lancashire, England. It contains ten listed buildings that are recorded in the National Heritage List for England. Of these, one is at Grade II*, the middle grade, and the others are at Grade II, the lowest grade. The parish contains the village of Barton and surrounding countryside. Running through it is the Lancaster Canal, and a bridge crossing it and an aqueduct are listed. The other listed buildings include farm buildings, milestones, a church, and a cross.

== Key ==
Grade	Criteria
II*	Particularly important buildings of more than special interest
II	Buildings of national importance and special interest

== Buildings ==
Name and location	Photograph	Date	Notes	Grade
Wing of former Barton Old Hall; 53.83791°N 2.71492°W	—	16th century (or earlier)	The wing of a former manor house, later used for agricultural purposes. It is timber-framed with brick cladding and a slate roof. The building has a rectangular plan, with six bays and two storeys. In the north wall is a 32-light mullioned and transomed window.	II*
Barn, Barton Old Hall; 53.83792°N 2.71447°W	—	16th century (probable)	The barn is cruck-framed, with modern brick walls and a corrugated sheet roof. It has a rectangular plan, with six bays and two storeys. In the south gable are the arms of the Barton and Shuttleworth families in relief.	II
Barn, Fisher's Farm; 53.84647°N 2.72452°W	—	17th century (or earlier)	The barn is cruck-framed, clad in brick, and has a corrugated sheet roof. It has four bays with lean-to extensions, and contains a wagon entrance doorways and a round pitching hole. Inside are three full cruck trusses.	II
Raby's Old Farmhouse; 53.85084°N 2.73047°W	—	17th century (or earlier)	This originated as a farmhouse, and was later altered and used for other purposes. It is cruck framed, built in brick with some boulder stone, and has a corrugated iron roof. There are 1 1/2 storeys and three bays, and the building contains two segmental-headed doorways, two segmental-headed casement windows, and a dormer with a sliding sash window.	II
Milestone; 53.82472°N 2.73590°W		Mid to late 18th century	The milestone is in stone, it is about 1 metre (3 ft 3 in) high, and has a triangular plan with convex sides and a rounded top. The sides have panels with the distances in miles to Garstang and to Preston.	II
Milestone; 53.83906°N 2.73990°W		Mid to late 18th century	The milestone is in stone, it is about 0.75 metres (2 ft 6 in) high, and has a triangular plan with convex sides and a rounded top. The sides have panels with the distances in miles to Garstang and to Preston.	II
Hollowforth Aqueduct (Bridge No. 38); 53.82054°N 2.75071°W		1790s	The aqueduct carries the Lancaster Canal over New Mill Brook. It is in sandstone, and consists of three elliptical pipes about 3 metres (9.8 ft) high and 4 metres (13 ft) wide. They have rusticated voussoirs, and flat coping running down on curved outer abutments.	II
Hepgreave Bridge (No.39); 53.82325°N 2.75127°W		c. 1797	The bridge carries Station Lane over the Lancaster Canal. It is in sandstone, and consists of a single elliptical arch with triple keystoness, bands, parapets with rounded coping, and pilastered ends.	II
St Lawrence's Church; 53.82894°N 2.73603°W		1895–96	The church, designed by R. Knill Freeman in Decorated style is in yellow sandstone with red sandstone dressings and a slate roof with red ridge tiles. It consists of a nave with a clerestory, aisles, a chancel with a south chapel, and a northwest steeple. The steeple has a two-stage tower with angle buttresses rising to corner pinnacles, a moulded south doorway, lancet windows, and octagonal bell stage, and a spire with lucarnes.	II
Barton Cross; 53.83015°N 2.70798°W		1901	This is in stone, and consists of a simple cross on a pedestal consisting of a tapered block on a cubic block. These stand on a base of large slabs about 2 metres (6 ft 7 in) square, which may date from the late medieval era. There is an inscription on the pedestal.	II
