= Parlick Fell cheese =

Sheep's milk cheese from Lancashire, England

Parlick Fell
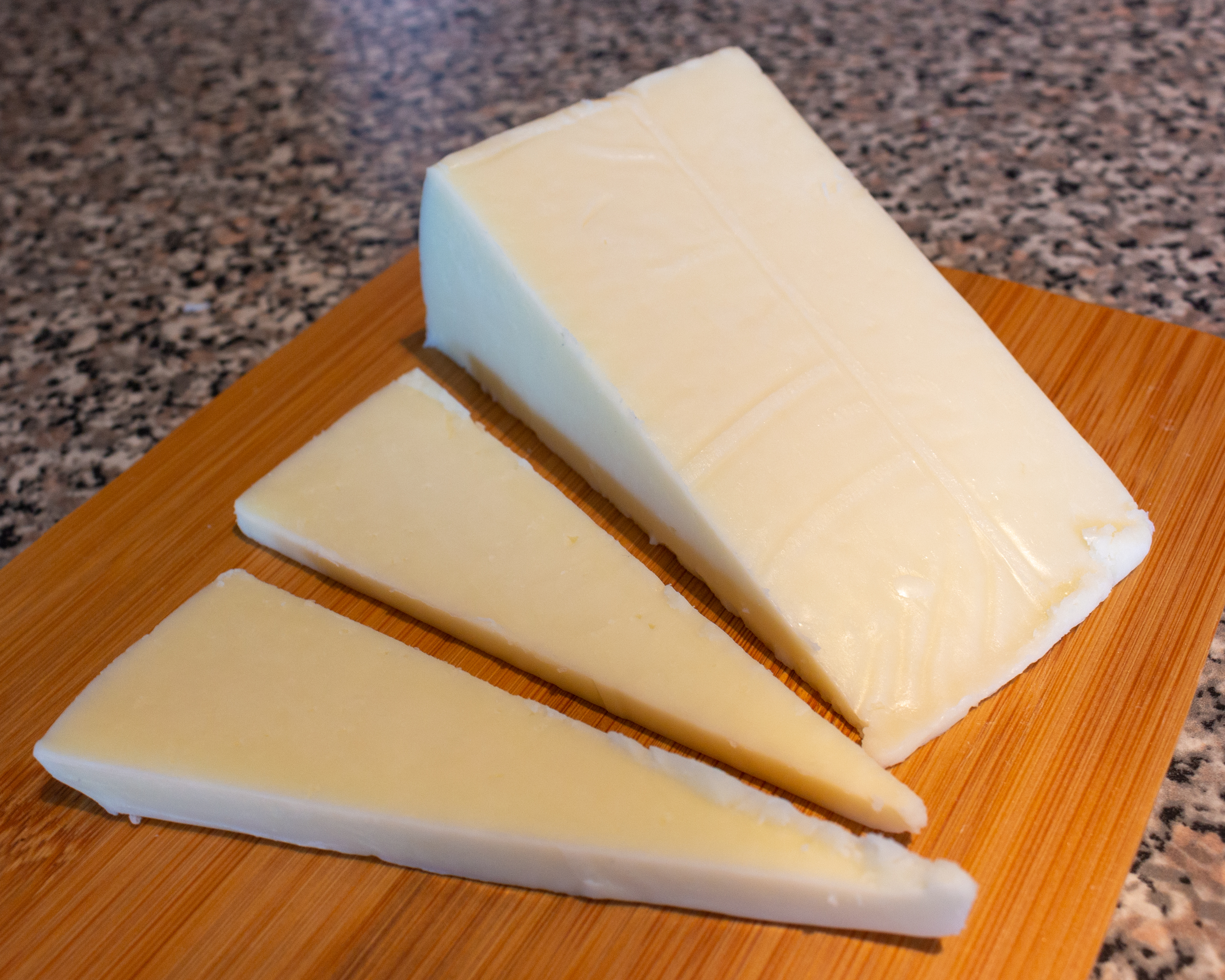
- Country of origin: England
- Region: Lancashire
- Town: Longridge
- Source of milk: Sheep
- Named after: Parlick

Parlick Fell is a cheese made from sheep milk in Longridge, Lancashire, England. It is a white cheese with a semi-soft, crumbly texture and a tangy, nutty flavour.

The cheese is made by Singletons & Co. It is named after Parlick, one of the hills at the southern end of the Bowland Fells, on which sheep owned by Simon Stott are grazed.
