= St Mary's Church, Goosnargh =

Coordinates: 53.8267°N 2.6707°W

St Mary the Virgin, Goosnargh
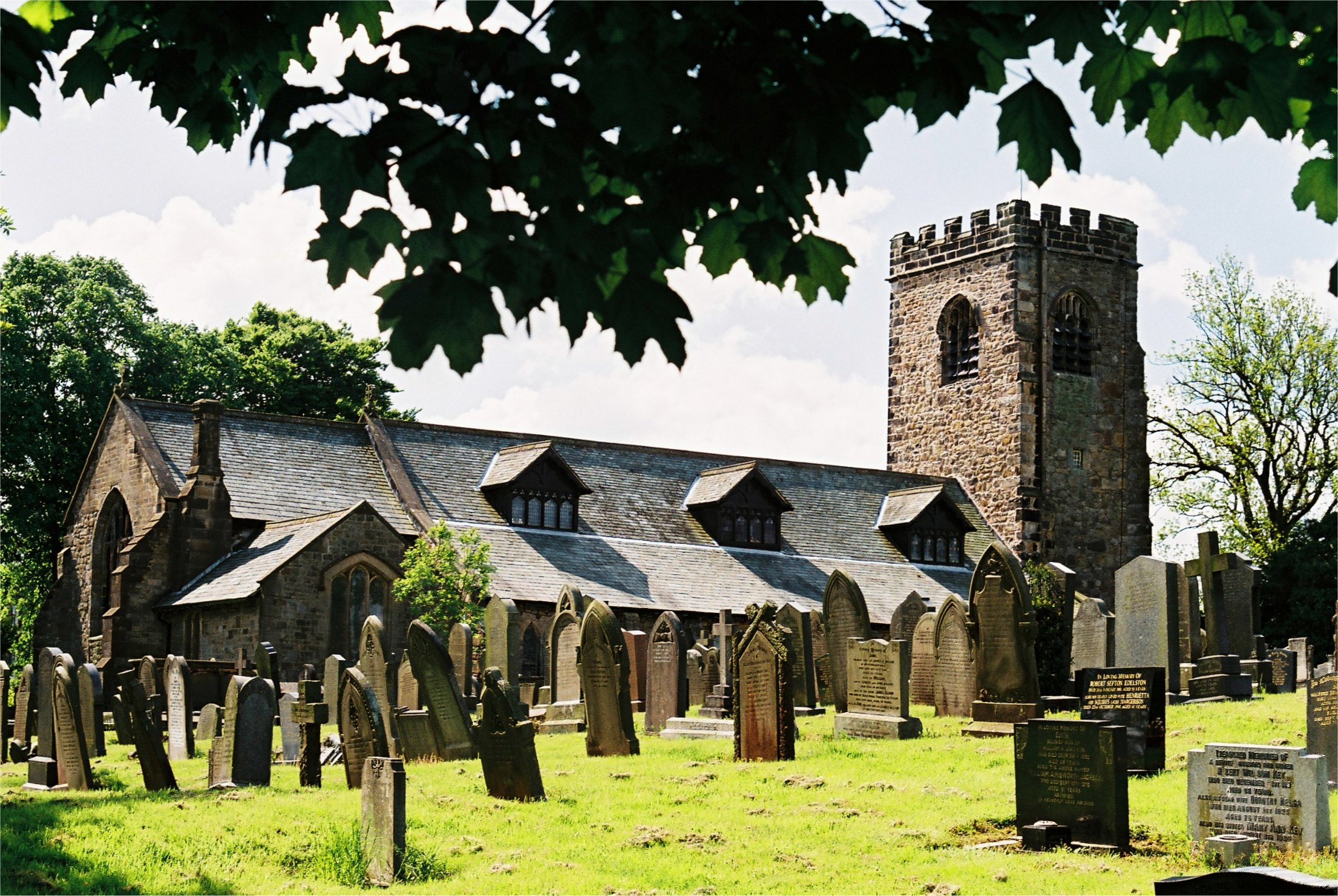
- St Mary's Church from the north

- Location in the City of Preston district
- OS grid reference: SD 55951 36922
- Location: Goosnargh, Lancashire
- Country: England
- Denomination: Anglican

History
- Status: Parish church

Architecture
- Functional status: Active
- Heritage designation: Grade II*

Specifications
- Height: 60 feet (18 m)

Administration
- Province: York
- Diocese: Blackburn
- Archdeaconry: Lancaster
- Deanery: Garstang

Clergy
- Rector: Revd Gregor Stewart

The Church of St Mary the Virgin is an Anglican church in Goosnargh, a village north of Preston in Lancashire, England. The church dates from the Middle Ages; it was enlarged in the 16th century and restored twice in the 19th century.

St Mary's is an active parish church in the Diocese of Blackburn and the archdeaconry of Lancaster. It has been designated a Grade II* listed building by English Heritage.

== History ==
St Mary's Church dates from the Middle Ages; it was probably in existence by 1281, and certainly by 1330. It was probably first established as a chapel of ease to St Michael's Church in Kirkham. With the possible exception of one of the windows of the north aisle, nothing of the current building is older than the 15th century, with features from this period including the tower and the north arcade and aisle.

The church was enlarged commencing in the 16th century; the chancel is said to have been rebuilt in 1553 and the south arcade and aisle were possibly rebuilt at the end of the 16th or early in the 17th century. At the end of the 18th century, possibly in 1788, the western gallery was added and in 1800, the eastern gallery in front of the chancel. In 1868–1869 substantial repairs and restoration of the church's older features was undertaken by Lancaster architecture firm Paley and Austin; they renovated the roof (at which time the gabled dormers were possibly added), repaired window stonework and lowered the floor. Seating in the nave and aisles was altered. Further restoration took place in 1895.

== Present day and assessment ==
St Mary's was designated a Grade II* listed building on 11 November 1966. The Grade II* designation—the second highest of the three grades—is for "particularly important buildings of more than special interest". An active church in the Church of England, St Mary's is part of the diocese of Blackburn, which is in the Province of York. It is in the archdeaconry of Lancaster and the Deanery of Garstang.

== Architecture ==
=== Exterior ===
St Mary's is constructed of sandstone rubble with gritstone dressings and has slate roofs. Its plan consists of a nave with aisles to the north and south, a chancel to the east (with galleries facing north and south), and a tower to the west. There is a porch to the south-west of the south aisle, and a vestry north of the chancel. Most of these feature are designed in the Romanesque style. The roof over the nave features three gabled dormers on the north and two on the south, each with four small semi-domed windows to provide illumination for the congregation.

The tower is 60 feet (18 m) tall. It is of three stages and has a stair turret to the south-east. There are diagonal six-stage buttresses at the west corners and a square three-stage buttress at the north-east corner. The tower has a crenellated parapet. It has three-light belfry louvres that have Perpendicular style tracery and a rounded arched doorway.

The south aisle is of four bays and has low buttresses. The east window in the chancel is recessed and has five plain, pointed lights.

=== Interior and fittings ===
The nave measures 70 feet 6 inches (21.49 m) by 20 feet 6 inches (6.25 m). It is separated from the aisles by arcades with pointed arches and octagonal piers. The Middleton Chapel is at the east end of the north aisle and has by wooden screens that date from the late 17th or 18th century. In the south aisle there is a stone baptismal font that is 1 foot 5 inches (0.43 m) tall and has a large square bowl. It possibly dates from the 15th century.

The tower has an active ring of six bells, with the inscriptions: Treble, 'God preserve the Church and Queen Ann 1713'; (2) 'Prosperity to the Church of England a.r. 1742'; (3) 'Abr. Rudhall cast us all 1713'; (4) 'Christopher Swainson A.M. minister, a.r. 1742'; (5) 'Presented by R. Newsham esq. Mears and Stainbank 1883'; tenor, 'I to the Church the living call and to the grave do summon all, 1753.'

The chalice is from 1746 and a paten is inscribed 'Presented to Goosnargh Church in memoriam Charles Osborne Gordon, vicar of the parish, who died Aug. 19, 1892.' There are also a plated chalice and flagon, and a plated breadholder inscribed 'Presented to the Parish Church of Goosnargh by Townley Rigby Knowles esq. in memory of the late William Shawe esq. 1872.'

A pipe organ was previously located in the west gallery. The current organ, at the east end of the south aisle, was built in 1906. Stained glass in the church includes work by Shrigley and Hunt, Harry Stammers and Heaton, Butler and Bayne.

== Churchyard ==
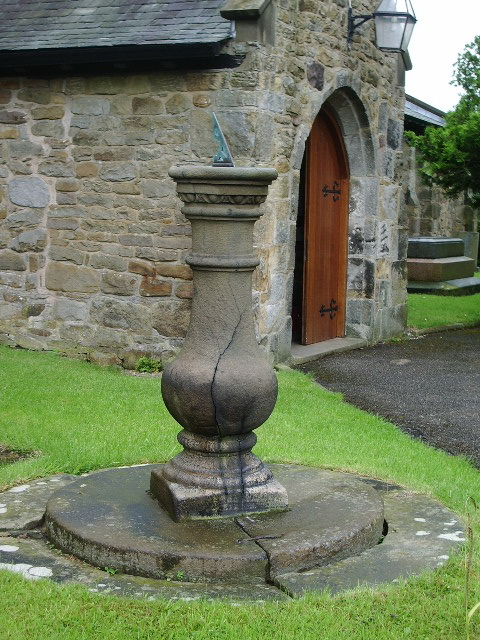
Sundial in the churchyard

The gravestones in the churchyard include one dated 1668. There are war graves of four soldiers of World War I and one of World War II. To the south of the church there is a sandstone sundial which has two circular steps with a pedestal shaped like a vase; there is plate attached which is dated July 1746 and bears the name of the Rev. C. Swainson. It has been designated as a Grade II listed building. South of the chancel is the sandstone base of a preaching cross from the late Middle Ages. The cross base also has a Grade II designation.

== See also ==
- Listed buildings in Goosnargh
- List of ecclesiastical works by Paley and Austin
