= Goosnargh =

Village and parish in Lancashire, England

Coordinates: 53.824°N 2.674°W

- Village
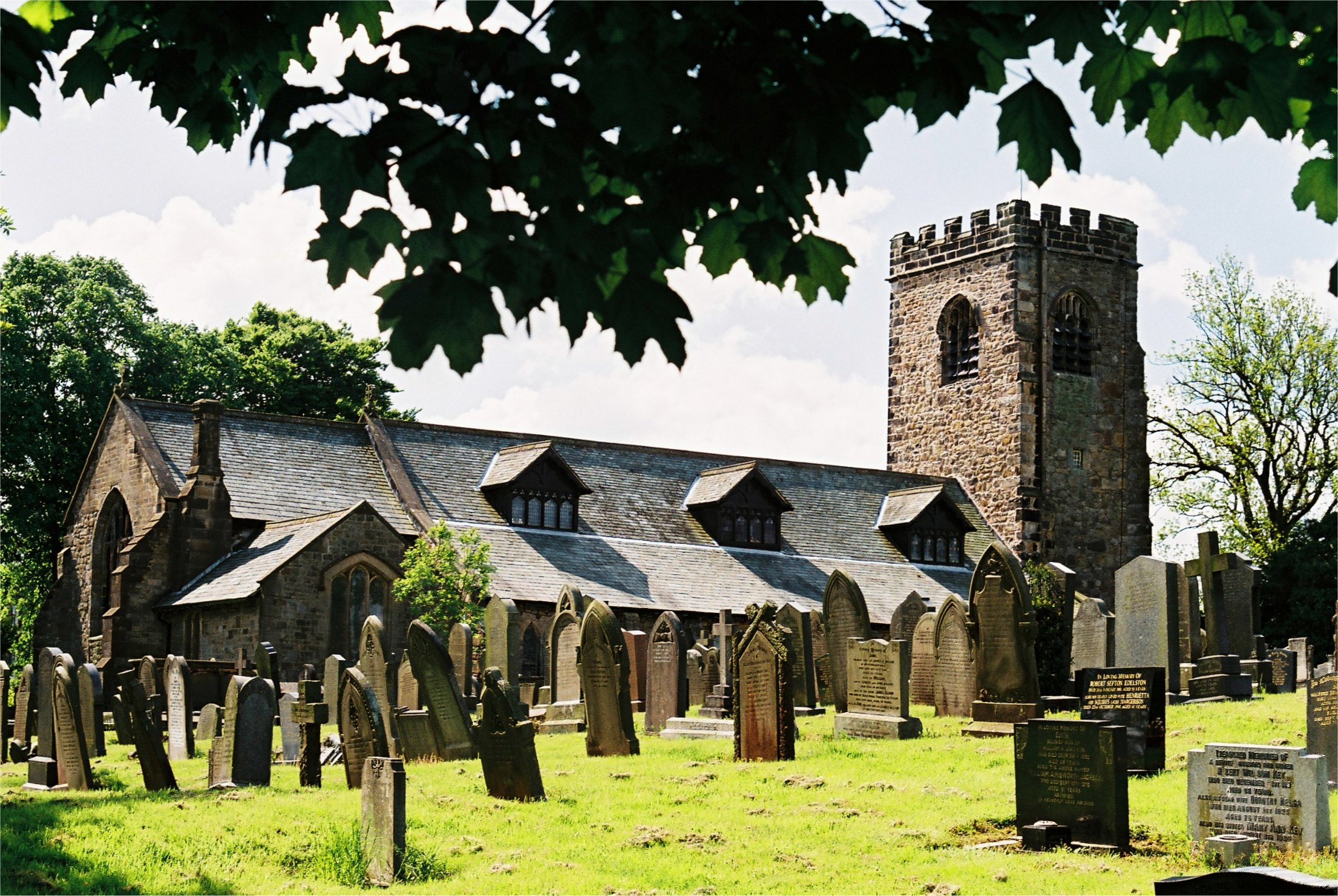
- Goosnargh Parish Church, St Mary the Virgin

- Village shown within the City of Preston district Location within Lancashire
- Population: 1,299 (2021)
- OS grid reference: SD557367
- Civil parish: Goosnargh; Whittingham
- District: Preston
- Shire county: Lancashire
- Region: North West
- Country: England
- Sovereign state: United Kingdom
- Post town: PRESTON
- Postcode district: PR3
- Dialling code: 01772
- Police: Lancashire
- Fire: Lancashire
- Ambulance: North West
- UK Parliament: Ribble Valley

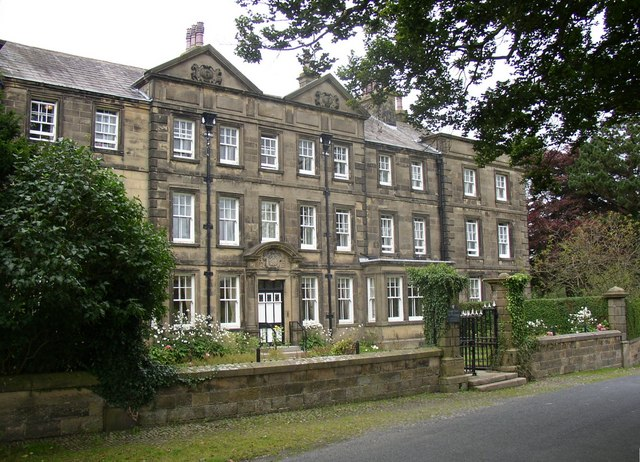
Bushell House, retirement home

Goosnargh (/ˈɡuːznər/ GOOZ-nər) is a village and civil parish in the City of Preston district of Lancashire, England.

The village lies between Broughton and Longridge, and mostly lies in the civil parish of Whittingham, although the ancient centre lies in the civil parish of Goosnargh. The parish of Goosnargh had a population of 1,204 recorded in the 2001 census, increasing to 1,316 at the 2011 Census. The village population in 2011 was 1,072. The population in 2021 was 1,299.

== Toponymy ==
The name, meaning "Gosan's or Gusan's hill pasture", derives from Gosan or Gusan (an Old Irish personal name) and erg (Norse for "hill pasture"). The name appeared in the Domesday Book as Gusansarghe but by 1212 had changed to Gosenargh, closer to today's pronunciation. However, one reference suggested Gusansarghe was from Old Norse gudhsins hörgi (related to hörgr), meaning "at the idol's (god's) temple."

== Goosnargh village ==
The Anglican parish church of St Mary the Virgin is situated on Church Lane. Trinity Methodist Church, originally dating from the early 1880s, is situated on Whittingham Lane.

Goosnargh has two public houses, The Grapes located on Church Lane and The Stags Head on Whittingham Lane. The Bushells Arms, also located on Church Lane, closed in 2010 and is now a private residence.

There is also a Post Office, hairdresser, pharmacy, village hall, florists and a fish and chip shop in the village. There used to be a gift shop and an estate agent in the village but these have closed down. The village is also the location of the Whittingham and Goosnargh Social Club.

The village holds an annual festival on the first Saturday after the Spring Bank Holiday Monday during which there is a procession through the village. The procession includes decorated floats, fancy dress, maypole dancing and marching bands.

Goosnargh Cornfed Chicken and Duck is championed by chefs including Gordon Ramsay.

The oldest house in Goosnargh is Stone Cottage on Goosnargh Lane. It is now 339 years old. The beams in the 900-year-old local church have traces of sea salt in them. People believe they were from old Viking long boats.

The village itself has a population of 1,540, much of which is included in the civil parish of Whittingham.

There are two bus services to Goosnargh, numbered 45 and 46, with an hourly service on each route. The 45 connects the village with Preston city centre, Fulwood, Longridge, and Blackburn, while the 46 goes to Preston, Cottam, and Longridge. There are also a number of school buses which run through the village (584, 585 and 678).

Goosnargh village has a primary school: Goosnargh Oliversons C of E. Broughton High School, Longridge High School and St Cecilia's RC High School are the three high schools whose catchment areas include Goosnargh.

The footballers Lily Parr and Peter Corr both died in Goosnargh.

Bushell House, formerly known as Bushell's Hospital, on Mill Lane, is a retirement home and a Grade II listed building dating from 1722.

=== Goosnargh cake ===
The village gave its name to the Goosnargh cake, a type of caraway seed shortcake biscuit. The biscuits were traditionally sold at Whitsun. On Whit Tuesday in 1846 at the Annual Club Day at Goosnargh, the Preston Chronicle reported that thousands were sold and sellers were unable to satisfy demand. According to the Preston Herald in 1896 cakes with the "real Goosnargh flavour" were only obtainable in the village. A photograph of a Mrs Davis of Goosnargh sugaring Goosnargh cakes appeared in the Daily Mirror in November 1937. The accompanying caption states the cakes were baked in her cottage oven and would be sent to Australia, New Zealand and South Africa for Christmas. It was reported that Lloyd George became partial to Goosnargh cakes after eating some at a Christening and made out an order to a Mrs Cartwright in the village.

== Goosnargh parish ==
Goosnargh
- Civil parish
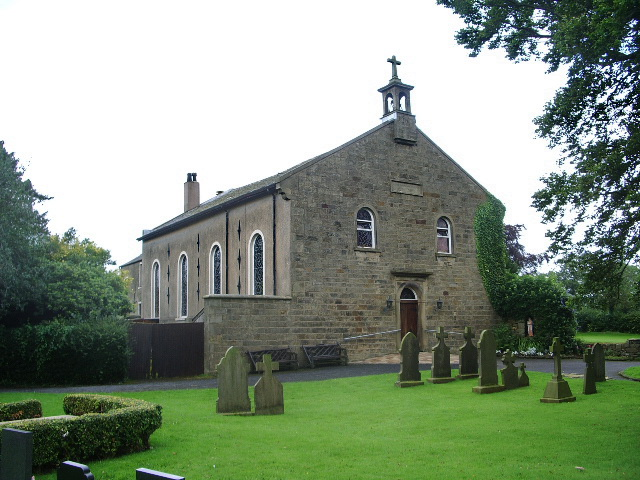
- St. Francis Church
- Interactive map of Goosnargh
- Country: England
- Primary council: Preston
- County: Lancashire
- Region: North West England
- Status: Parish
- Settlements: Goosnargh, Inglewhite and Whitechapel

Area
  - Total: 33.68 km^{2} (13.00 sq mi)

Population (2011)
  - Total: 1,316
  - Density: 39.07/km^{2} (101.2/sq mi)
- Website: http://www.goosnarghpc.co.uk/

Civil parishes in the City of Preston
- Barton
- Broughton
- Goosnargh
- Grimsargh
- Haighton
- Ingol & Tanterton
- Lea
- Whittingham
- Woodplumpton

Goosnargh parish includes the small villages of Inglewhite and Whitechapel, and Beacon Fell Country Park. The northernmost part of the parish, including Whitechapel and Beacon Fell, lies within the Forest of Bowland Area of Outstanding Natural Beauty. The River Brock forms part of the parish boundary on the northwest and north sides.

The parish contains the Roman Catholic church of St Francis, Hill Chapel, and an adjoining Catholic primary school of the same name. The sixteenth-century Catholic martyr George Beesley was born at the site.

Waddecar Scout Activity Centre (formerly Waddecar Scout Camp), on Snape Rake Lane on the southern bank of the River Brock, was established in the mid-20th century.

Only one side of one road in Goosnargh village, including the parish church, lies within Goosnargh parish; almost all of the village lies within adjacent Whittingham parish. This may explain why the village is sometimes referred to as "Goosnargh and Whittingham", as if there were two villages. Some road signs on entering the village display "Goosnargh and Whittingham". The website of the local "Goosnargh & Whittingham Whitsuntide Festival" refers to "the twin villages of Goosnargh and Whittingham". An article in a local newspaper also refers to "the villages of Whittingham and Goosnargh". However, no modern maps show a village marked "Whittingham" and the website of Whittingham Parish Council refers only to the village of Goosnargh.

Newsham was separated from Goosnargh parish in 1894 and transferred to the parish of Barton. The parish was part of Preston Rural District throughout its existence from 1894 to 1974. In 1974 the parish became part of the Borough of Preston, which became a city in 2002.

=== Local businesses ===
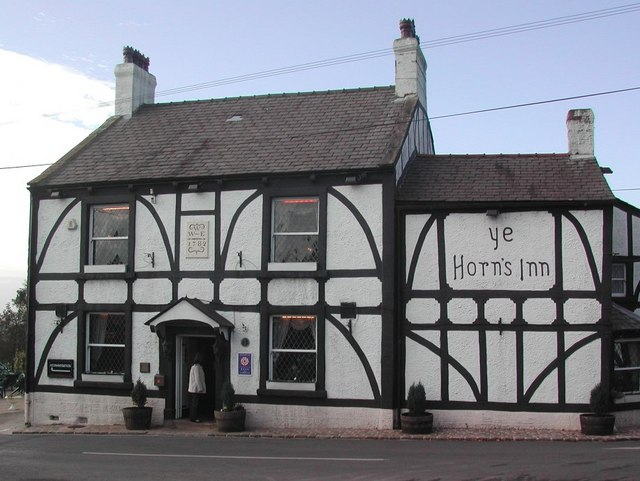
Ye Horn's Inn

Five of the ten Lancashire cheese dairies listed on the British Cheese Board's website in 2009 are located in Goosnargh parish: Butler's, Greenfields, Mrs Kirkham's, Shorrocks and Carron Lodge.

The parish is the home of Goosnargh Gin which is inspired by the nearby Bowland Fells. Two miles out of Goosnargh village is Ye Horns Inn.

In July 2015 an outbreak of bird flu occurred at a poultry farm in the parish, leading to a cull and the imposition of a 6-mile (10 km) exclusion zone. The strain of flu was identified as H7N7 and Public Health England confirmed there was little risk to public health.

=== Fallout bunker ===
During the Second World War the operations bunker of RAF Barton Hall was located at a site on Langley Lane on the border of the parishes of Goosnargh and Whittingham. After the war the Royal Observer Corps 21 Group Headquarters and the Western Sector Control of the United Kingdom Warning and Monitoring Organisation took over the bunker.

In the bunker was the standby national control of the famous "four-minute warning" air-raid warning system for the UK. The ROC and UKWMO were disbanded between 1991 and 1995 and the nuclear bunker was closed. The premises are now used as a veterinary practice.

== In popular culture ==
The name "Goosnargh" appears in the works of Douglas Adams. In So Long, and Thanks For All the Fish, it is a Betelgeusian word used by Ford Prefect "when he knew he should say something but didn't know what it should be."

Alternatively, in The Meaning of Liff, his comic dictionary based on British place names, it is defined as "Something left over from preparing or eating a meal, which you store in the fridge despite the fact that you know full well you will never ever use it."

== Notable people ==
- George Beesley (born c. 1562-1591), Roman Catholic diocesan priest, a Catholic martyr, beatified in 1987.
- Peter Armstrong Whittle (1789–1866), an English antiquarian.

== See also ==
- Listed buildings in Goosnargh
