= Buwch Frech =

Y Fuwch Frech (Welsh: literally the speckled/brindled cow) is a cow in Welsh folklore.

She was described by Elias Owen as the "Freckled Cow". In his essay on folklore, written originally for the national eisteddfod of 1887 and subsequently republished, he recorded a story from Denbighshire of a cow which was said to give milk to "any one ... in want of milk" until a witch milked the cow dry. The cow then left, plunging into a lake near Cerrig-y-drudion, and leading her two children, long-horned oxen (which are themselves the subject of other legends), after her. Owen also quoted an earlier author on the matter of another Buwch Frech. This author translated it as a Dun Cow, and wrote that a bone said to belong to it was to be found in Gwydir near Llanrwst. Owen observed that "we have in these places conflicting conditions, which I will not endeavour to reconcile".

The idea of fairy cows with abundant milk which came from and returned to lakes occurs across Wales: Robin Gwyndaf of the Museum of Welsh Life lists a number of other names for them in both English and Welsh. Owen likewise linked his Freckled Cow with a number of similar cows such as one over the border in Shropshire: "There she is known as The White Cow of Mitchell's Fold". This cow also gave a pail of milk to anyone who came until a witch milked her dry.

== See also ==
- Dun Cow
