= Parlick =

Hill in Lancashire, England

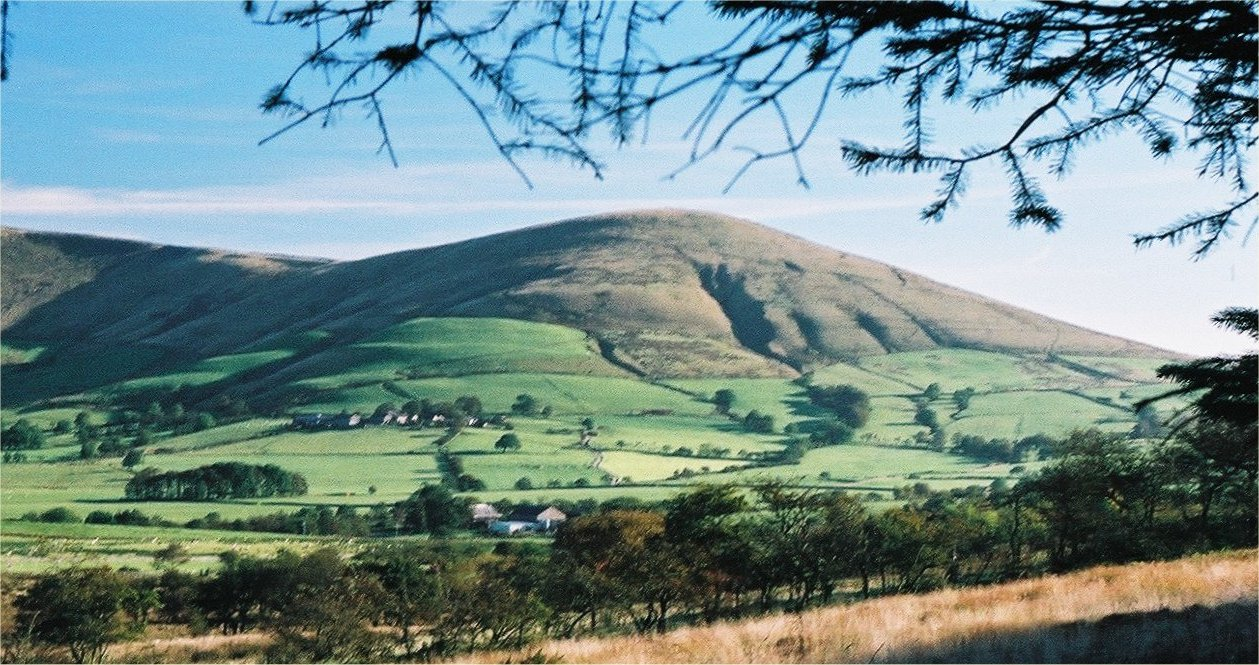
- View of the fell's southwesterly slopes

Highest point
- Elevation: 432 m (1,417 ft)
- Prominence: c. 34 m
- Coordinates: 53°53′59″N 2°37′00″W

Geography
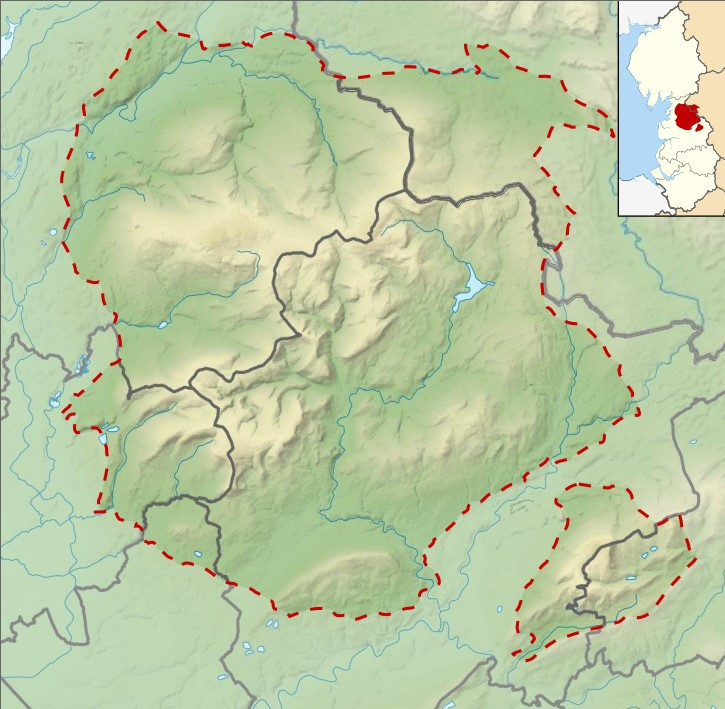
- Location within the Forest of Bowland Location within Lancashire Location within the Borough of Wyre Location within the Borough of Ribble Valley
- Location: Lancashire, England
- Parent range: Forest of Bowland
- OS grid: SD599453
- Topo map: OS Landranger 102

Parlick (also known as Parlick Pike) is an approximately cone-shaped steep-sided hill at the extreme south of the main range of Bowland fells in Lancashire, England. It has an elevation of 432 metres (1,417 ft) above sea level.

== Origin of the name ==
Regarding the origin of the name, Professor Eilert Ekwall, in his 1922 The Place-names of Lancashire, writes:

".. (caput de) Pirloc 1228 C1R, Perlak 1228 WhC 371, Pireloke 1338 LPR, Pyrelok pyke c 1350 ib. The name cannot mean "pear orchard" as Wyld suggests. But the etymology may be correct with a slight amendment. O.E. loc means "fold for sheep or goats." A sheep fold at which grew a peartree (O.E. pyrige) may very well have been at the foot of or on the slope of the hill; this may have been called Parlick (Pirloc) and have given the hill its name. For a probable earlier name see under Core, p. 143." (Note: Ekwall continues: "But I think it very likely that Core is really an old name of Parlick Point. The name Couerhill of 1284 rather tells in favour of this hypothesis. I so, the name is very likely derived from O.N. kofri "a hood, cap." The fine hill of Parlick has a very characteristic shape. Seen from the W. it looks rather like a slightly oblique pyramid; from the S. it presents a more rounded outline. It seems quite probable that it may have been thought to resemble a primitive cap or hood. Or there may have been an old word meaning "hill" or the like belonging to the group of words under discussion; cf. O.N. kufr "rounded summit," Du. kuif "top of a tree," etc (Torp-Fick p. 47).)

== Recreation ==
Parlick has an elevation of 432 metres (1,417 ft) above sea level and a prominence of about 34 metres (112 ft). The grassy ascent of Parlick, free from peat, contrasts with the shallow boggy hills to its north. Paths zigzag up this hill from the south, or for the more strenuous ascent a straight path can be chosen. This hill is usually green — different from the often thorny brown to red of the northern hills. A thin neck joins Parlick onto Fair Snape Fell with well-worn paths linking the two.

The summit consists of little more than a flat collection of stones, leaving the walker to look at the view, south to Preston and Winter Hill near Chorley, east toward Pendle Hill, and west towards Blackpool and the Irish Sea.

Parlick is a popular venue for foot-launched and conventional gliders, because it produces good ridge lift in an unusually wide variety of wind directions. The extensive west-facing bowl allows paraglider pilots to fly to Fair Snape Fell and beyond without leaving reliable ridge lift and as far forwards as Beacon Fell. Local pilots use this arena for club competitions, such as the 'Parlick Grid Challenge'

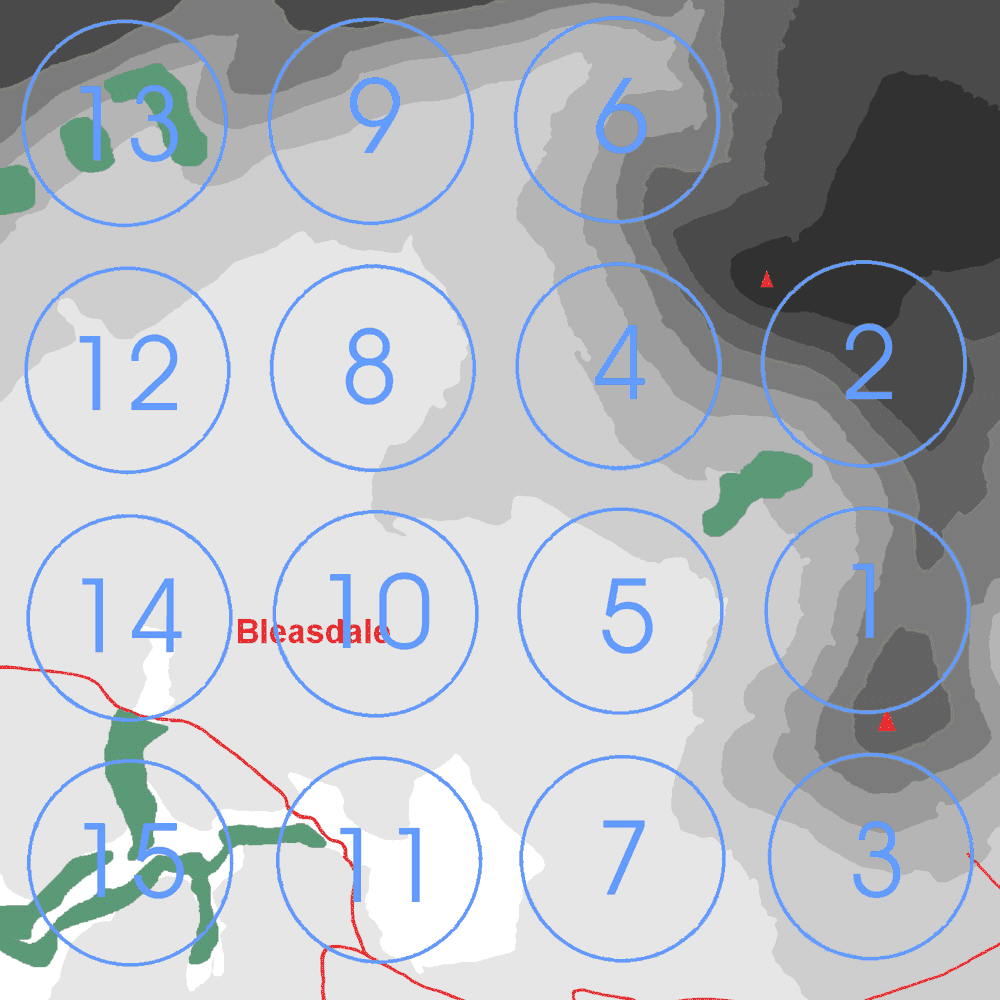
Layout of the "Parlick Grid Challenge" for gliders. Parlick is bottom right, between grid locations 1 and 3.

The boundary between the boroughs of Wyre and Ribble Valley passes very close to the summit, with half of the hill lying within each borough.

== Local aspects ==
The hill and its environs are the location of the legend of the enormous Dun Cow, which was reputed to wander freely across the moorland, and to be in the habit of quenching its thirst at "Nick's Water-Pot", a well on the summit of Parlick.

"Parlick Fell" is the name of a cheese made in Longridge from sheep's milk from the area.

== Gallery ==
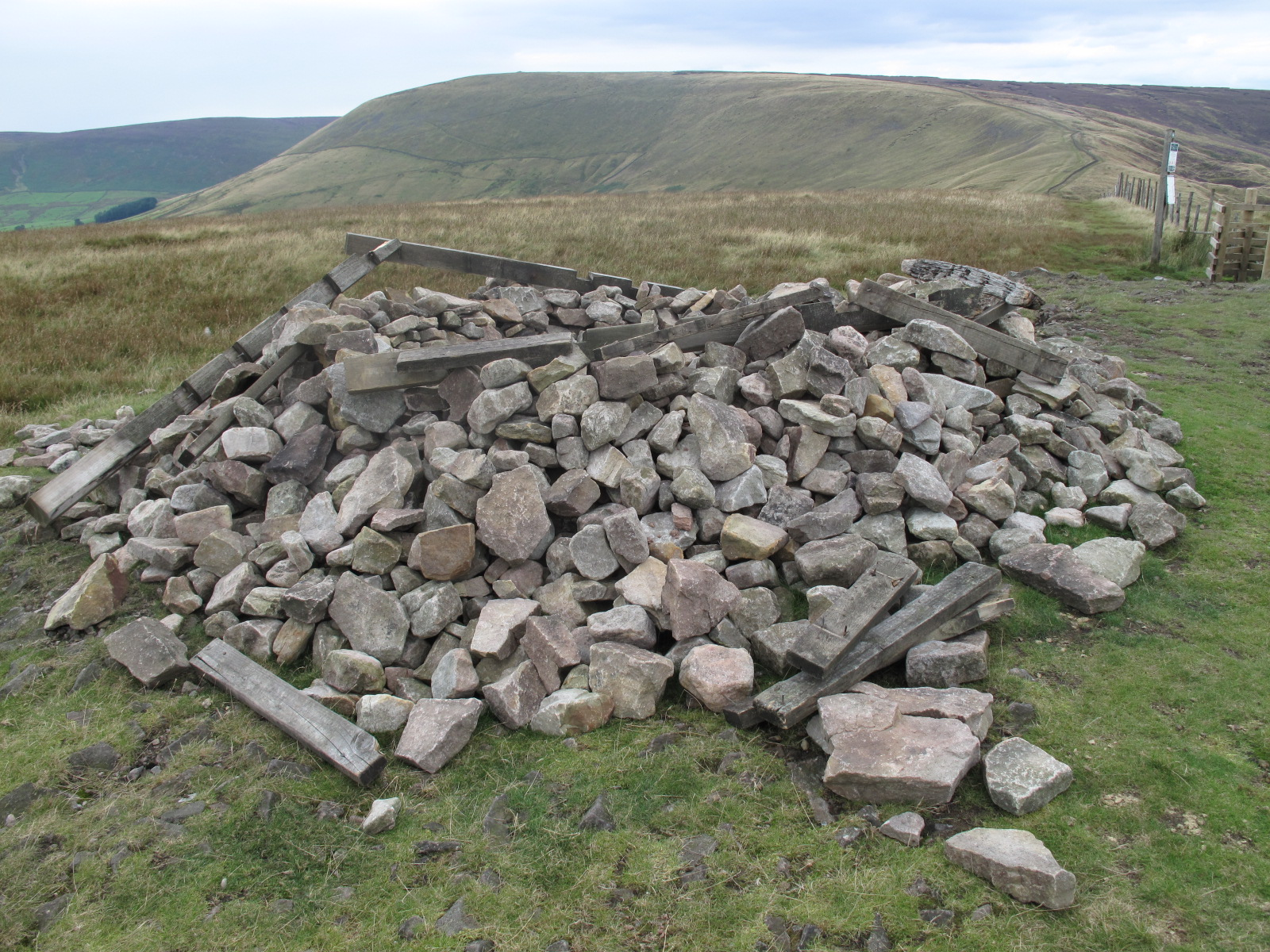
The summit of Parlick in 2009

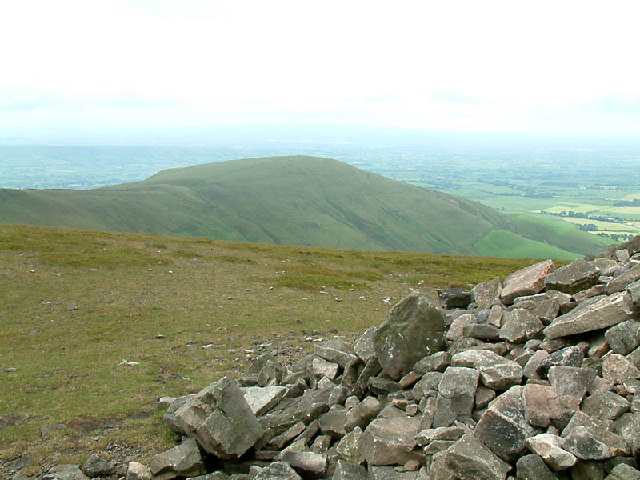
Looking down on Parlick, from the lower summit marker on Fair Snape Fell

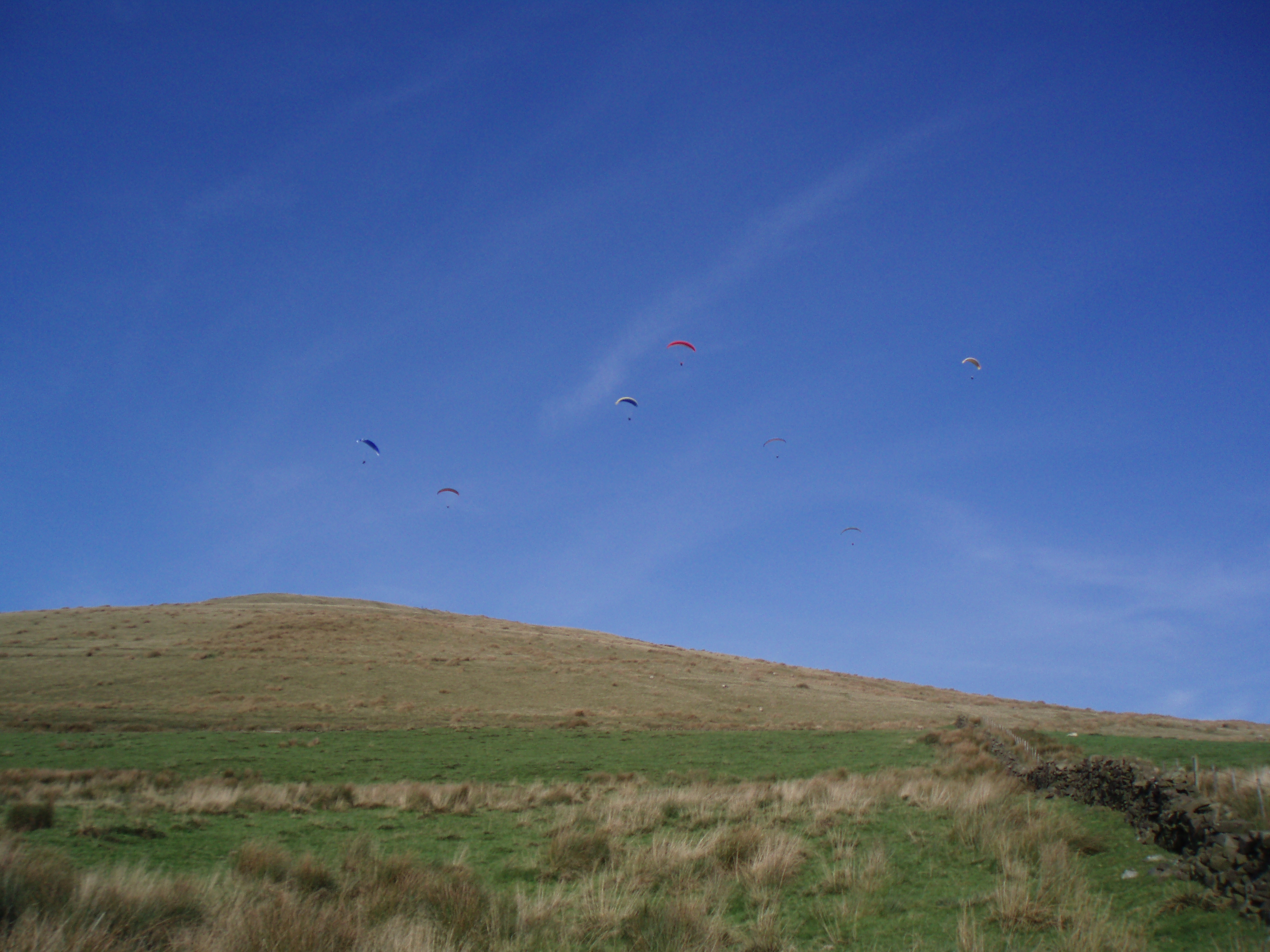
Paragliding around Parlick
