= Beacon Fell, Lancashire =

Fell in the civil parish of Goosnargh in Lancashire, England

Beacon Fell
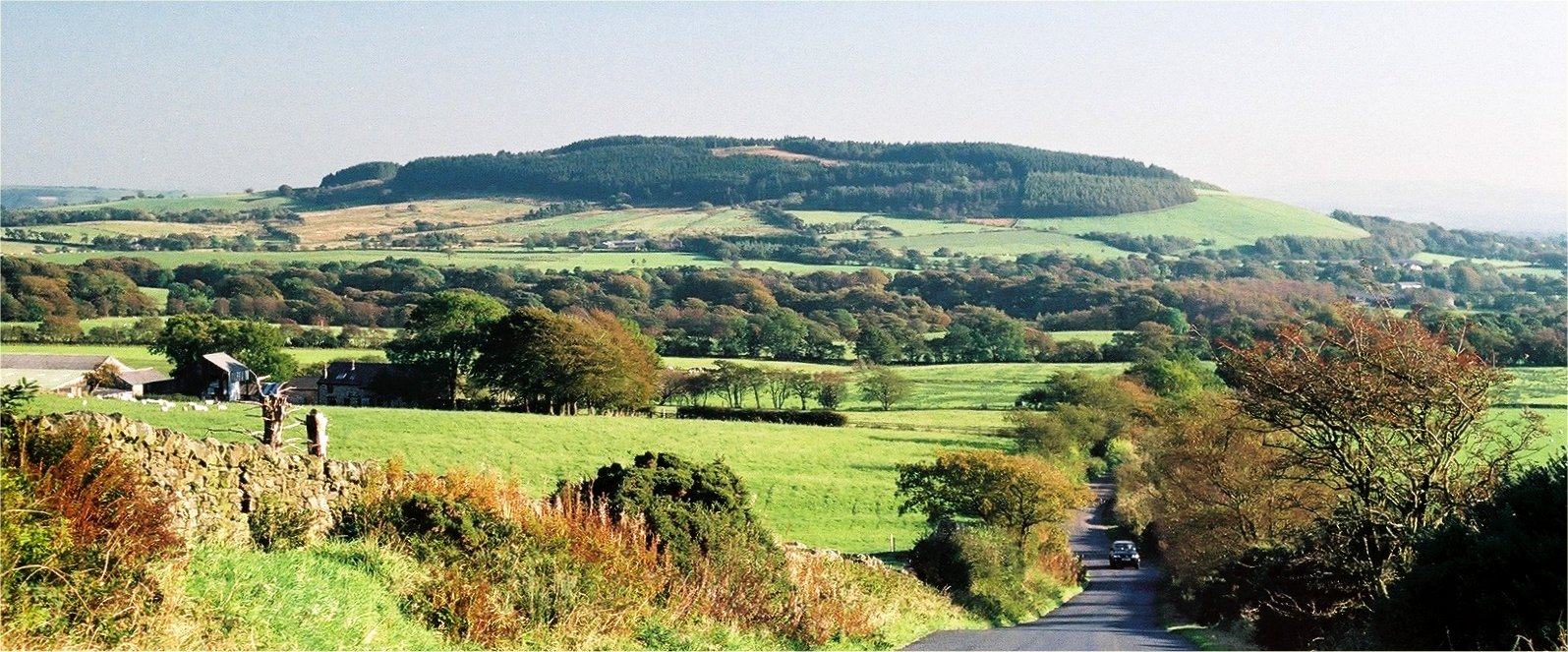

Highest point
- Elevation: 267 m (876 ft)
- Coordinates: 53°52′47″N 2°39′36″W

Geography
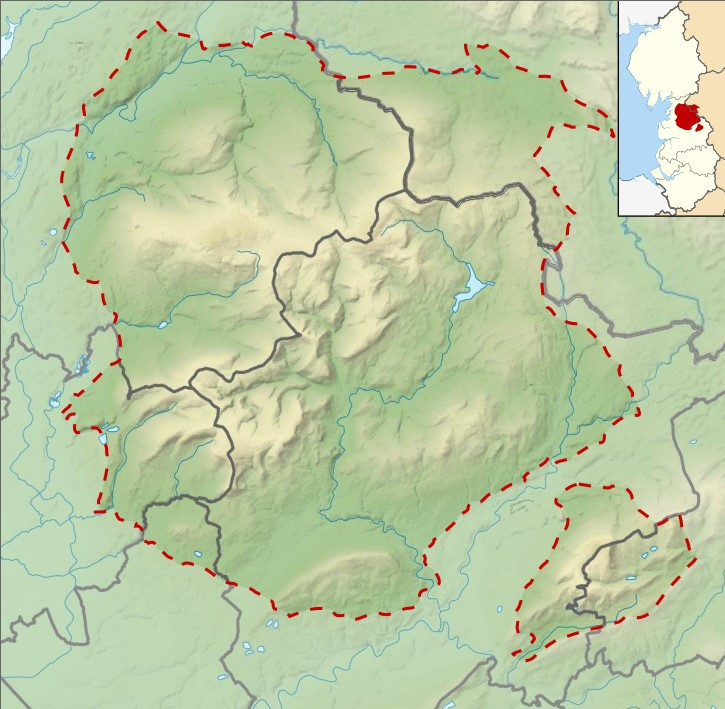
- Location within Lancashire Location within the Forest of Bowland Location within the City of Preston district
- Location: Lancashire, England
- OS grid: SD567428

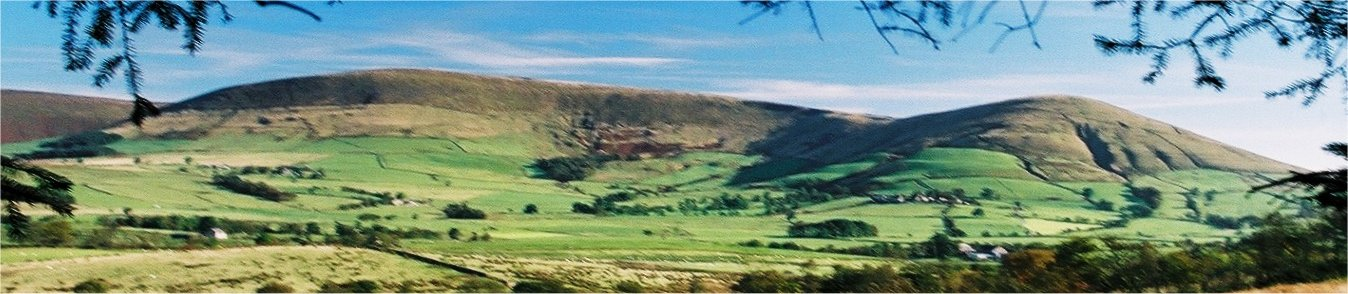
Looking north to Fair Snape Fell (left) and Parlick (right)

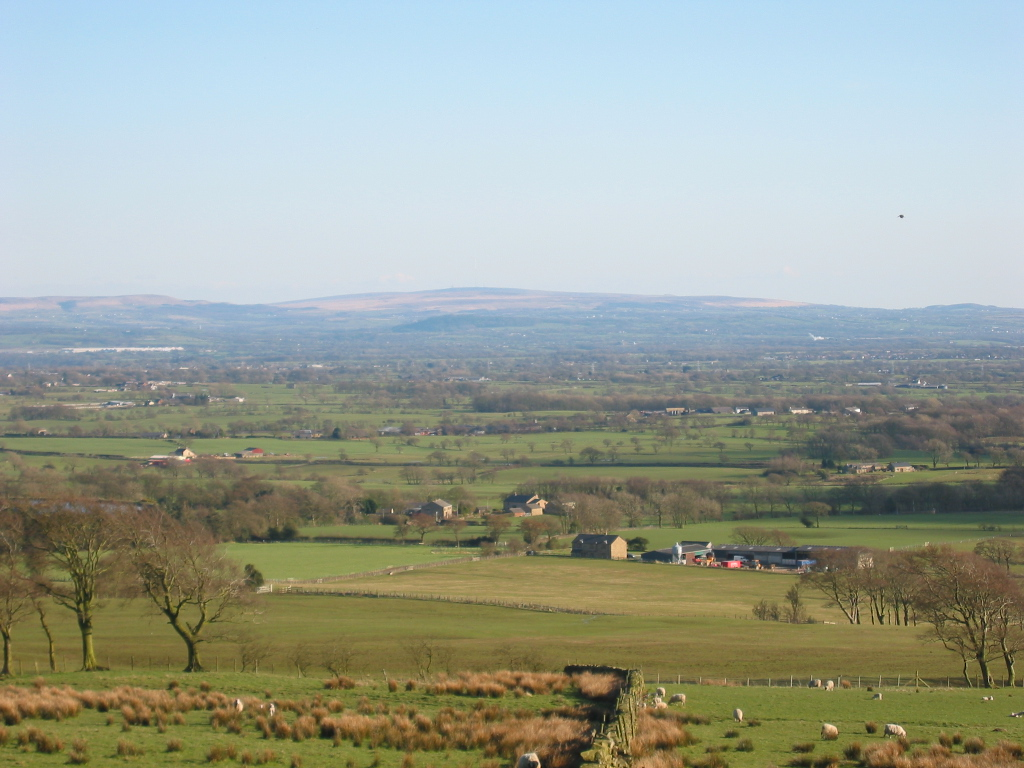
Looking south towards Preston

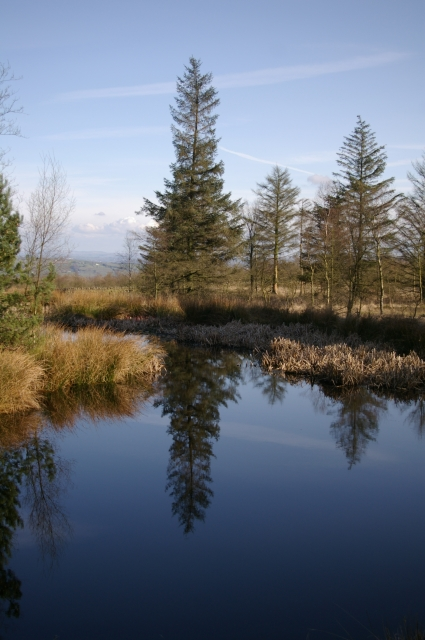
Beacon Fell Tarn

Beacon Fell is a fell in the civil parish of Goosnargh in Lancashire, England. The high ground, which rises to 267 m (876 ft), has been a country park since 1970. It is situated within the south westerly part of the Forest of Bowland, an Area of Outstanding Natural Beauty. There is a trig point on the most-visited summit at 266 metres (873 ft), but another summit in the coniferous woodland 250m to the east reaches 267 metres (876 ft).

== Location ==
Beacon Fell is an isolated hill 2 miles (3 km) south of the main range of hills in the Forest of Bowland. Although, at 267 metres (876 ft) above sea level, it is small compared with the neighbouring fells, its position offers commanding views over the flat plain of the Fylde and Morecambe Bay to the west, as well as the Ribble valley to the south.

From the most-visited summit of Beacon Fell there are extensive views

- to the west, of the whole of the Fylde, including Blackpool Tower;
- to the north-west, the southern part of Morecambe Bay;
- to the north and north-east, of the Forest of Bowland hills, particularly Fair Snape Fell and Parlick;
- to the east, of Chipping, Pendle Hill, Longridge Fell and Longridge;
- to the south, of Preston.

On a clear day the Welsh hills, the Lake District hills and the Isle of Man may be visible.

== History ==
The high visibility of the fell made it an ideal location for a beacon. A beacon on the fell has been recorded as early as 1002. The fell formed part of a chain of beacons to warn of the approach of the Spanish Armada in 1588, and of French forces between 1795 and 1815. More recently, beacon chains have been lit in celebration of coronations and jubilees.

In 1909, Fulwood Urban District Council bought the fell, which until then had been farmland, as a water supply. Under the provisions of the Fulwood and Whittingham Water Act 1882 (45 & 46 Vict. c. xi), water from the fell was collected in the existing Barnsfold Reservoirs, 1 mile (2 km) to the south-west, and from there piped to Fulwood and Whittingham Asylum via Horns Dam Reservoir in Goosnargh parish and a small covered reservoir in Haighton. Conifer woodland was planted on the fell to help manage drainage. From 1959, the fell was no longer required for water, and was left to fall into disrepair. The reservoirs at Barnsfold are now used for angling.

== Country park ==
Lancashire County Council acquired the site in 1969 and opened it, in October 1970, as one in the first tranche of country parks in the United Kingdom. A new road was built connecting the existing single-track roads on the fell to form a circular route around the fell, to be operated as a one-way system. Car parks were added, and on the site of a farmhouse a visitor centre was built.

The park is popular with visitors. It has a network of well-maintained footpaths through largely coniferous woodland. The Bowland Visitor Centre provides information about the fell and the Forest of Bowland, and serves refreshments. Wildlife that may be observed on the fell includes rabbit, hare, roe deer, stoat, weasel, red fox, badger, hedgehog, mole, grey squirrel and the otter. Eleven species of dragonflies and damselflies have been found around the fell's tarn.

Charges were introduced in the car parks nearest to the visitor centre in 2011.

=== Art installations ===
The fell features a number of sculptures by local artist Thompson Dagnall, Black Tiger and Kissing Seat (2006), Walking Snake (1998), Spruced up Heron (1996) and Orme Sight (1996) however the Owl (2013) which replaced Hanging Bat (1998) was not carved by Thompson Dagnall. Lancaster artist Richard Shilling is artist in residence who creates short-lasting sculptures from surrounding materials.

== Cheese ==
Beacon Fell Traditional Lancashire Cheese, named after the Fell, and currently manufactured in Longridge and Garstang, has Protected Designation of Origin status. Only cheeses made with milk from the Fylde or the Preston area, and conforming to the published method of production, may use this name.
