= Deepdale Street railway station =

Former railway station in England

Preston Deepdale Street

General information
- Location: Deepdale, Preston, Preston; England
- Coordinates: 53.7643°N 2.6900°W
- Grid reference: SD546299

Other information
- Status: Disused

History
- Original company: Preston and Longridge Railway

Key dates
- 1 May 1840: Station opened
- 1 November 1856: Station closed
Location
- Location within Preston Location within Lancashire

Deepdale Street railway station was the original Preston terminus of the Preston and Longridge Railway in Lancashire, England, when it first opened in 1840. It was located in Deepdale Street, off Deepdale Road, on what was then the outskirts of Preston. The rail line was originally designed to carry quarried stone from Longridge to Preston, so the passenger facilities were quite rudimentary and there were many sidings near the station for unloading stone.

In 1856, passenger services were diverted to a new line via Deepdale Bridge and Miley Tunnel to a new terminus at Maudland Bridge. Deepdale Street was closed to passengers but continued to be used for goods, even long after the rest of the line had closed. The railway served a coal depot in Deepdale Street, which remained open until the 1990s.

Tracks connecting Deepdale Street to the West Coast Main Line via Miley Tunnel still exist although they are now rusty and overgrown.

Preceding station	Disused railways	Following station
Terminus	Preston and Longridge Railway	Ribbleton towards Longridge
