= Brookfield, Preston =

Electoral ward in Preston, England

Coordinates: 53.782°N 2.666°W

Brookfield
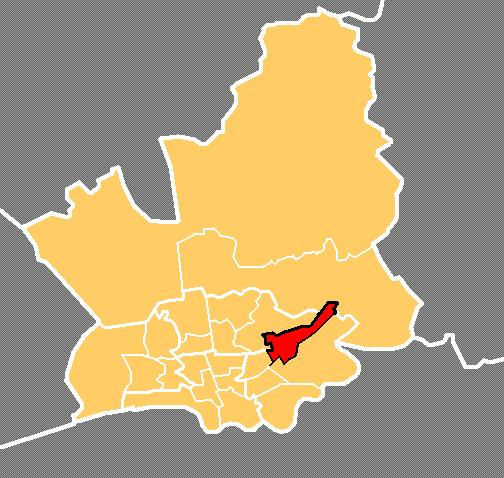
- Location in the City of Preston district

- Location in Preston Location within Lancashire
- Population: 7,301 (2011)
- District: City of Preston
- Ceremonial county: Lancashire
- Region: North West
- Country: England
- Sovereign state: United Kingdom
- UK Parliament: Preston
- Councillors: John Browne – Labour; Nerys Eaves – Labour; Philip Corker – Labour

Brookfield is an electoral ward of the city of Preston, in Lancashire, England. It is located north-east of the city centre, in the suburb of Ribbleton. At the 2001 census the ward had a population of 7,625, reducing to 7,301 at the 2011 Census. The area is represented on the city council by three Labour councillors. The area forms part of the Preston East division of Lancashire County Council, represented by one Labour councillor.

The area is mainly residential, and the majority of homes are privately owned although there is also a large council estate. The ward also contains a modern business park, which includes the head office of Booths, a regional chain of supermarkets. This is close to junction 31A on the M6 motorway.

== Current members ==
Election	Member	Party
2015 Preston City Council election	Nerys Eaves	Labour Party
2013 Preston City Council election	Philip Corker	Labour Party
2014 Preston City Council election	John Browne	Labour Party

== Transport ==
The M6 motorway runs through the area, but until recently there was no junction nearby. Junction 31A has now been built, but there is no connection to or from the Lancaster direction. Ribbleton railway station was near the Ribbleton ward boundary but the line has now closed. Bus services are provided by Preston Bus.
