= Whittingham Hospital Railway =

Dismantled railway in Lancashire, England

Coordinates: 53.814°N 2.637°W

The Whittingham Hospital Railway (WHR) was a private light railway operated by Lancashire County Council to serve Whittingham lunatic asylum. Opened in 1889, it carried goods and passengers between Grimsargh on the Preston and Longridge Railway and the hospital grounds. It closed to all traffic in 1957.

== Planning and construction ==
The asylum was completed in 1873. Before becoming a hospital, it was the long-time residence of the Waring family. The house was built in 1869 by Cooper and Tullis of Preston, to the designs of Henry Littler for £338,000.

In the early days of the hospital, all supplies, including coal and provisions, had to be transported by horse and cart from Preston – a distance of 7 miles (11 km) – or from Longridge at the terminus of the Preston and Longridge Railway some 3 1/2 miles (5.6 km) distant. The cartage was expensive; permanently staffed with a stud of horses and vehicles. In 1884, the significant costs of this operation prompted the authorities to consider building a railway between the hospital and the village of Grimsargh 2 miles (3.2 km) to the southeast.

A four-man committee made its first report in August, 1884 when it estimated the cost of the 2,863-yard (2,618 m) line at £12,000 giving an annual saving of £1,050 over road haulage but this assumed that the Lancashire and Yorkshire Railway and London and North Western Railway – joint owners of the Longridge branch line – would work the service. They refused, but did grant junction facilities at Grimsargh.

Strong opposition from local land owners and a lack of support from the hospital's own Finance & General Committee stalled the project. Further revision of the cost brought the estimated price down to £9,000 but the project still could not gain sufficient support to proceed. Refusing to admit defeat, the committee obtained a hearing before the more senior General Committee who approved and the matter was placed before the Annual Session at Preston in 1885. Success was followed by the presentation of a bill for a private act of Parliament that year at an initial cost of £550.

A goods only, horse drawn operation was envisaged at this stage on the "proposed Whittingham Tramway". Prolonged financial negotiations with reluctant land-owners saw two years pass before the final plot of land for the line was acquired. With £10,000 allocated for construction the first sod was cut at Grimsargh in 1887 but work proceeded only with great difficulty. Land slips caused by an exceptionally bad winter of 1887 delayed completion and increased costs. Finally in March 1889, the contractor reported that the permanent way was ready, but the Tramway Committee had to ask for a further £5,000 to complete the works plus purchase a locomotive and two goods vans. Traffic for goods commenced in June 1889.

At £14,000, the construction price was not overly expensive for its day, comprising a deep cutting about a half mile (800 m) in length and an embankment in similar proportion. Two substantial bridges were also required, one of which was a skew bridge construction. Further expansion took place in 1921-22 when the line was extended to a new boiler house at a cost of £3,200. The total length of the railway was then 3,386 yards (3,096 m).

== Route ==
The route of the branch commenced on the north side of the level crossing in Grimsargh and curved sharply westward on a falling gradient into the deep cutting and on to the embankment before crossing Brabiner Lane. The line then climbed on a gradient of 1:120 to the hospital grounds passing over a small accommodation bridge before entering Whittingham station. A small coal storage area and engine shed existed beyond the hospital station and the 1921 extension continued for 523 yards (478 m) across the hospital lawns, beside the fish pond, to the boiler house.

For the opening of the line, two goods vans were acquired. Notwithstanding the committee's remit to convey only goods traffic the original desire to transport passengers was facilitated by the purchase of a carriage from the Lancaster Carriage and Wagon Works. Five more were later acquired; all four-wheelers: two from North London Railway and the others locally from the Lancashire and Yorkshire Railway. In later life, these were replaced by three ex-L.N.W.R Diagram 17A 20 ton goods brake vans that were converted by the hospital joiners. Gas lighting was also fitted. An ex-Midland Railway van was purchased as a goods van to be attached onto the train made up of brake vans, it was later cut down to size and used as a permanent way wagon.

As well as carrying the goods needs of the hospital – mainly coal – a regular booked service of passenger trains was operated. In addition to serving the needs of the asylum's visitors and staff, the trains were available to any member of the public and were free of charge to all users. With the closure of the Longridge branch to passengers in 1930, the hospital trains were retimed to connect with the local bus service from Preston. About nine passenger trains ran each day, Sundays excepted. In 1918, 3000 passengers per week used the line and the annual tonnage of freight exceeded 12,000 tons (12,200 tonnes).

Being single track with a passing loop only at the Grimsargh end, it was the practice for many years to propel the train from Whittingham. However, following an accident involving some cattle, the train was subsequently pulled by the engine in each direction. Running around was achieved at Whittingham by hauling the train into a siding using a cable, until its replacement by a B.S.A. Company Truck Mover. (Note: A bicycle-like barrow, powered by a single cylinder two-stroke petrol engine and controlled by one operator holding a pair of handlebars)

=== Stations ===
The railway had two substantially built stations, one at each terminus, the one at Grimsargh being diagonally opposite the level crossing from the mainline station. This station had the only run-around loop on the railway and a connection with the Preston and Longridge branch facing in the direction of Longridge. Two sidings were also provided. On a single short platform, the station building comprised an open fronted shed of brick and wood with an overall roof and canopy. The building was some 40 ft (12 m) in length by 12 ft (3.7 m) wide with a 10 ft (3.0 m) waiting room at the Longridge end.

The station at Whittingham Hospital was of brick and corrugated iron construction which sported an overall glass roof above its single wooden platform and track. Access was by the means of steps as the station was situated on a high embankment.

=== Locomotives ===
The first locomotive purchased by the W.H.R. was an 0-4-0 saddle-tank (works number 304) built by Andrew Barclay & Sons Co. in 1888 at their Caledonia Works, Kilmarnock.

The original locomotive was fitted with outside cylinders gave good service until 1947 when it was scrapped. A further Barclay locomotive (works number 1024) arrived in 1904 becoming No. 2. It sported a 0-4-2 wheel arrangement with identical cylinders to engine No. 1, and 4 ft 1 in (1.24 m) wheels. This locomotive worked until 1952 when it was also scrapped.

W.C.M.H.R. Locomotives (1888–1947)
	No. 1	No. 2
Type	0-4-0 saddle tank	0-4-2 side tank
Builder	Andrew Barclay & Sons Co.	Andrew Barclay & Sons Co.
Works Number	304	1026
Date	1888	1904
Cylinders	13 x 20 inch stroke	13 x 20 inch stroke
Boiler	120 pounds per square inch (830 kPa)	160 pounds per square inch (1,100 kPa)
Coupled wheels	3 ft 7 in dia. 5 ft 6 in (1.68 m) centres	4 ft 1 in dia. 5 ft 6 in (1.68 m) centres
Trailing wheels		3 ft 0 in dia. 2 in radial
Total wheelbase	5 ft 6 in (1.68 m)	12 ft 4 in
Heating surface: Boiler	440 sq ft (41 m^{2})	460 sq ft (43 m^{2})
Heating surface: Firebox	48 sq ft (4.5 m^{2})	52 sq ft (4.8 m^{2})
Capacities: Water	640 imperial gallons (2,900 litres)	640 imperial gallons (2,900 litres)
Capacities: Coal	10 cwt	25 cwt
Locomotive weight: Empty	19 ton, 5 cwt	21 ton, 5 cwt
Locomotive weight: Loaded	23 ton, 5 cwt	25 ton, 0 cwt

With the scrapping of No. 1 just following the Second World War, new steam locomotives were only available on four year lead times, therefore a second-hand engine was acquired in 1947 from the Southern Railway at a cost of £750. This was a William Stroudley 0-4-2 D1 Tank and was named James Fryers in honour of the Chairman of the Hospital Management Committee. The engine was originally built for the London, Brighton and South Coast Railway in 1886. Numbered 357, it carried the name Riddlesdown. In Southern Railway service it bore the number 2357. Serious boiler defects in 1956 curtailed its working career and the engine met the scrap-man that year when it proved beyond economic repair. Before scrapping, it was the sole surviving member of its class.

A further locomotive was thus required and a 100 hp (75 kW) Sentinel shunter, named Gradwell, was acquired from Bolton gas works. It worked for only 18 months before the line was closed.

== Decline and closure ==
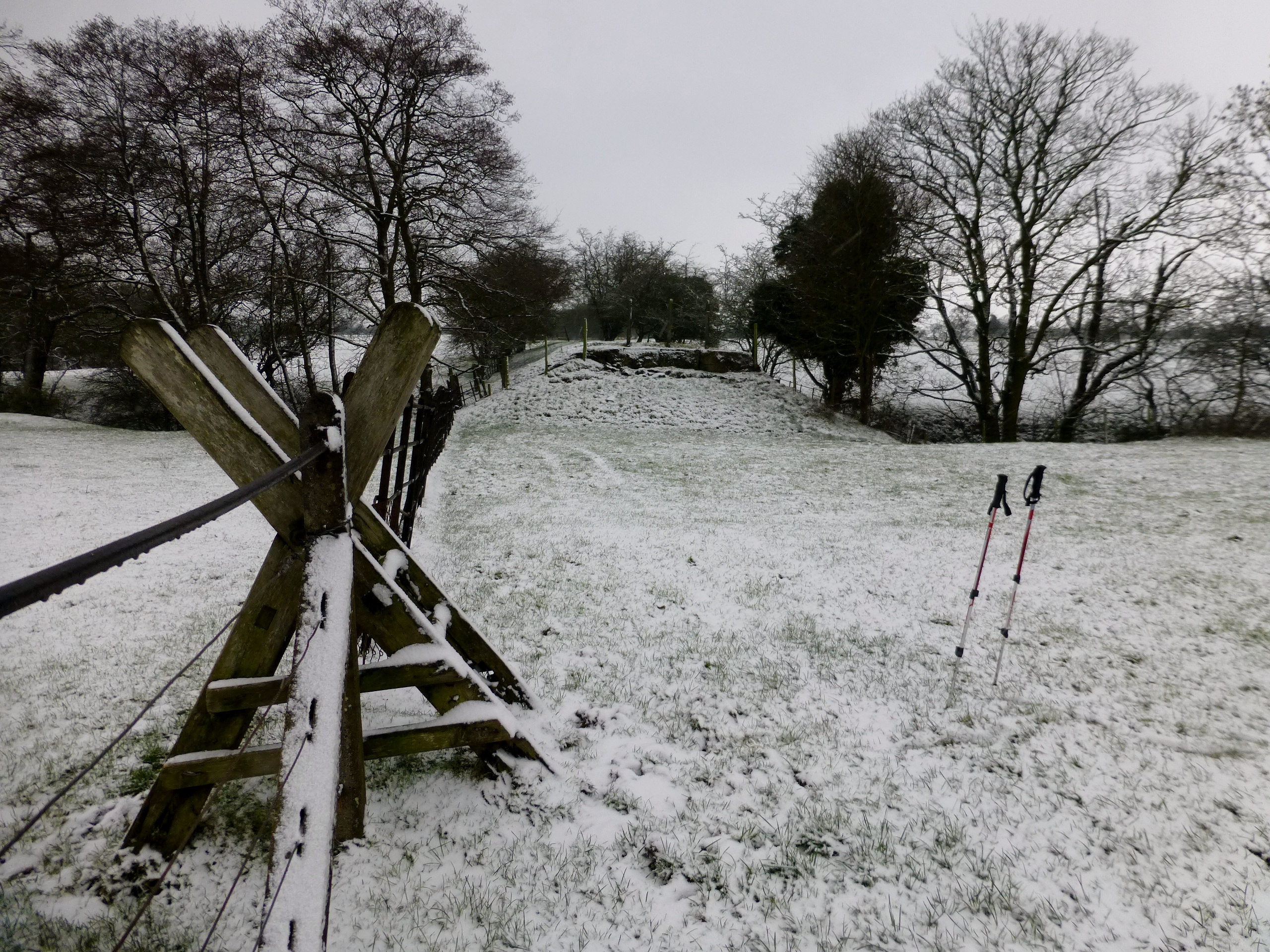
In 2013

With declining economic circumstances, the line closed to all traffic on 29 June 1957 following the 7:20 pm service from Grimsargh to Whittingham. Mr G. Wright, who had spent his entire working life as a driver on the Whittingham Hospital Railway was at the controls. After closure, the trackwork was soon lifted and the cutting filled in. The bridge over Brabiner Lane survived until the late 1970s but was subsequently demolished. Housing has been built on the Grimsargh station site and Whittingham Hospital itself closed in 1995.

== See also ==
- Grimsargh railway station
- Whittingham Hospital

== Notes ==
Citations
