= Deepdale railway station =

Disused railway station in England

Deepdale
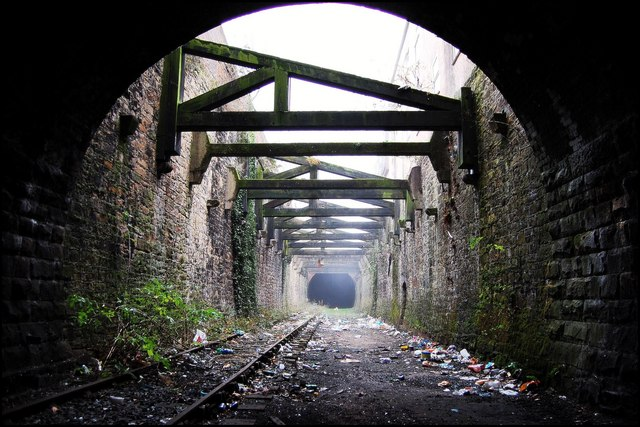
- The remains of the track in the disused tunnels in 2008

General information
- Location: Deepdale, Preston, Lancashire; England
- Coordinates: 53.7669°N 2.6912°W
- Grid reference: SD545302
- Platforms: 1

Other information
- Status: Disused

History
- Original company: Fleetwood, Preston and West Riding Junction Railway
- Pre-grouping: Fleetwood, Preston and West Riding Junction Railway
- Post-grouping: London, Midland and Scottish Railway

Key dates
- 1 November 1856: Opened as Deepdale Bridge
- 1867: Renamed Deepdale
- 2 June 1930: Closed
Location
- Location within Preston Location within Lancashire

Deepdale railway station (also known as Deepdale Bridge station) was on the Longridge Branch Line in Preston, Lancashire, England.

The station opened in 1856 as a replacement for Deepdale Street railway station which until then had been the Preston passenger terminus of the line. The new station lay on an extension, built in 1850, which connected to the earlier line near the level crossing in Skeffington Road. The extension passed through the 862-yard (788 m) Miley Tunnel to another new station at Maudland Bridge.

Deepdale station was the headquarters of the Fleetwood, Preston and West Riding Junction Railway, which had bought the Preston and Longridge Railway. The new line and tunnel were originally built to connect the Longridge line to the existing Preston and Wyre Joint Railway, as part of a planned route from Fleetwood on the Fylde coast to Skipton in the West Riding of Yorkshire. However, that plan had already collapsed by 1852.

The station, along with others on the line, closed to regular passenger services on 31 May 1930. The last passenger trains to use Deepdale station were 1970s football supporters' specials bringing away fans to Deepdale Stadium to watch a football match. This was done to keep visiting supporters away from the town centre before and after the match.

The line through the station continued to be used for goods trains until the 1990s, and the tracks, though rusty and overgrown, still exist as far as the Skeffington Road level crossing.

Preceding station	Disused railways	Following station
Maudland Bridge; Terminus	Fleetwood, Preston and West Riding Junction Railway until 1885	Ribbleton towards Longridge
Preston; Terminus	Fleetwood, Preston and West Riding Junction Railway from 1885	Ribbleton towards Longridge
