= WHR =

WHR may refer to:

== In health and wellness ==
- World Health Report, flagship publication of the World Health Organization
- Waist–hip ratio, a ratio of the circumference of the waist to the hips
- Waist-height ratio, a ratio of the circumference of the waist to the height. (In US usage, the form "waist-to-height" and the abbreviation WtHR, are more common.)

== In transportation ==
- West Horndon railway station, a mainline station in Essex, England
- Welsh Highland Railway in North Wales
- West Highland Line (West Highland Railway) in West Scotland
- Wells Harbour Railway in Norfolk
- Whittingham Hospital Railway in Lancashire, England

== Other ==
- Whirlpool Corporation (New York Stock Exchange ticker symbol)
- World hotel rating, a hotel rating and labeling system
- Waste heat recovery
