= Grimsargh railway station =

Former railway station in England

Grimsargh
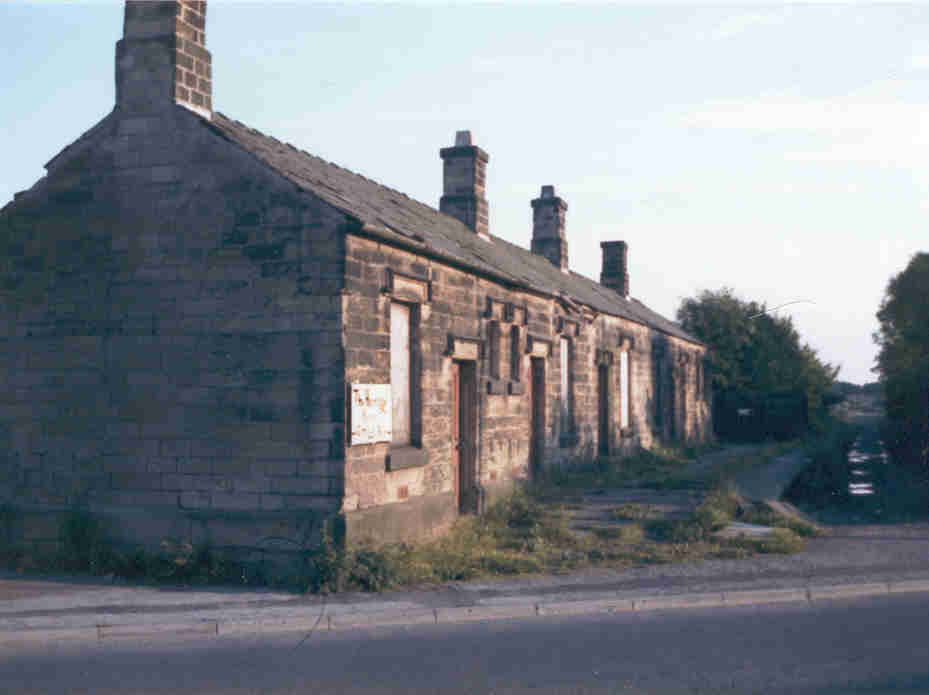
- Late 1970s, looking south, towards Preston, over site of level crossing

General information
- Location: Grimsargh, Preston; England
- Coordinates: 53.8043°N 2.6310°W
- Grid reference: SD585344
- Platforms: Main station: 1; Hospital station: 1

Other information
- Status: Disused

History
- Original company: Main station: Preston and Longridge Railway; Hospital station: Lancashire County Council
- Pre-grouping: Main station: Fleetwood, Preston and West Riding Junction Railway
- Post-grouping: Main station: London, Midland and Scottish Railway

Key dates
- 1 May 1840: Main station opened
- 1889: Hospital station opened
- 2 June 1930: Main station closed to passengers
- 29 June 1957: Hospital station closed
Location
- Location within the City of Preston district Location within Lancashire

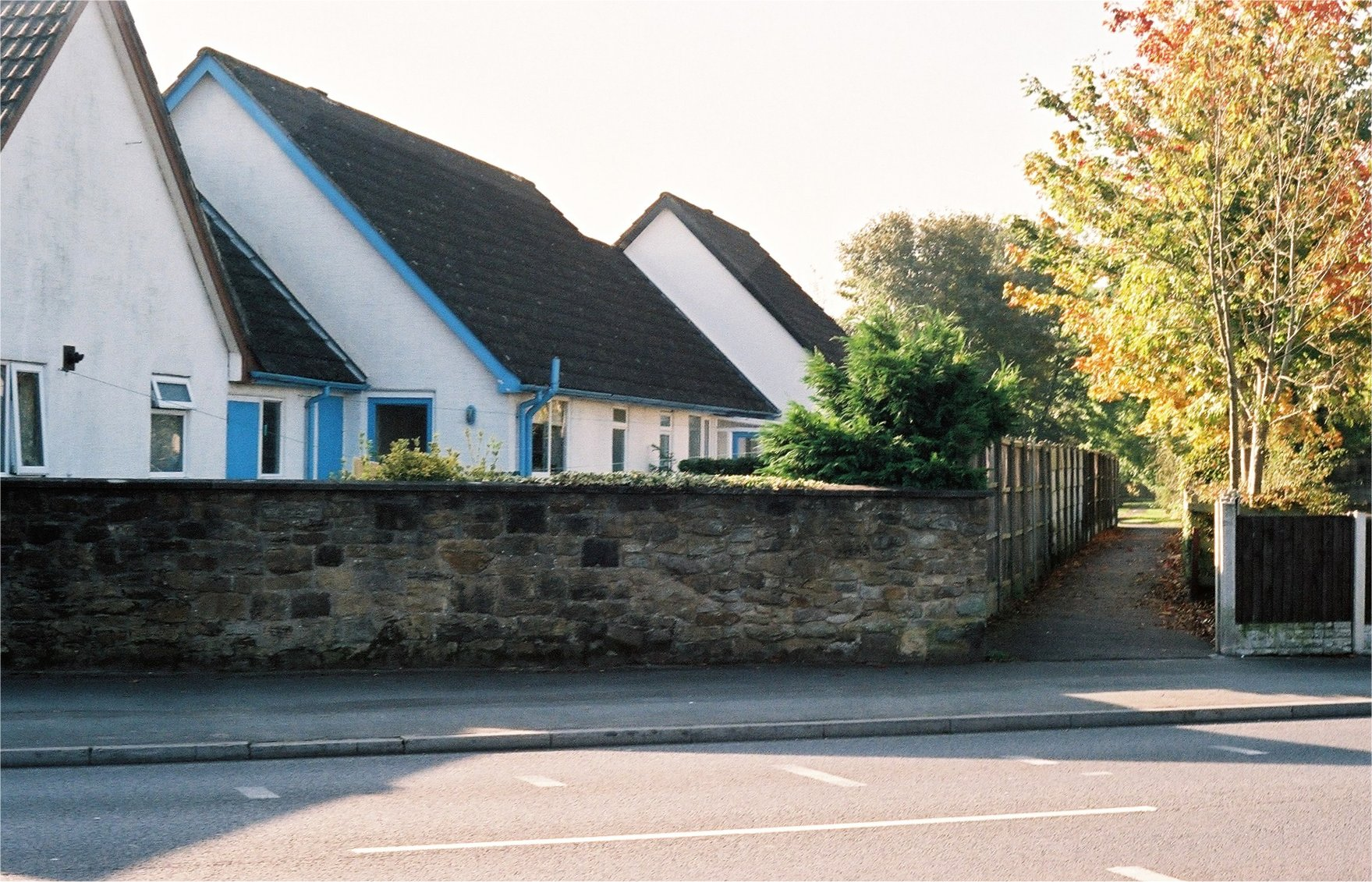
Site of the former station, in 2007. The footpath on the right follows the course of the dismantled line.

Grimsargh railway station was on the single track Preston and Longridge Railway. It served the village of Grimsargh in Lancashire, England.

When the line first opened in 1840, wagons carrying quarried stone ran downhill from Longridge to Preston and were hauled in the other direction by horses. There were rudimentary passenger facilities at Grimsargh — the nearby Plough Hotel was used as a booking office. It was not until 1870 that a proper station building was constructed, when the line was run jointly by the Lancashire and Yorkshire Railway and the London and North Western Railway.

In 1889, the privately run Whittingham Hospital Railway was opened to a second Grimsargh Station which was diagonally opposite the level crossing from the main station. This station had a run-around loop and a connection with the Longridge line facing in the direction of Longridge. Two sidings were also provided. On a single short platform, the station building comprised an open fronted shed of brick and wood with an overall roof and canopy. The building was some 40 ft (12 m) in length by 12 ft (3.6 m) wide with a 10 ft (3 m) waiting room at the Longridge end. Hospital trains were timed to connect with trains to and from Preston.

The Longridge-to-Preston line closed to passengers in 1930, but the hospital line continued to be used until 1957 when its single steam locomotive was condemned. The Longridge line's goods service was finally withdrawn in 1967. The station's buildings were demolished in the late 1970s and houses built on the site, the new houses following the alignment of the former station buildings.

== Notes ==
Preceding station	Disused railways	Following station
Ribbleton towards Preston	L&YR / L&NWR joint Preston and Longridge Railway	Longridge; Terminus
Terminus	Whittingham Hospital Railway	Whittingham Hospital; Terminus
