= Ribbleton railway station =

Former railway station in England

Fulwood / Ribbleton
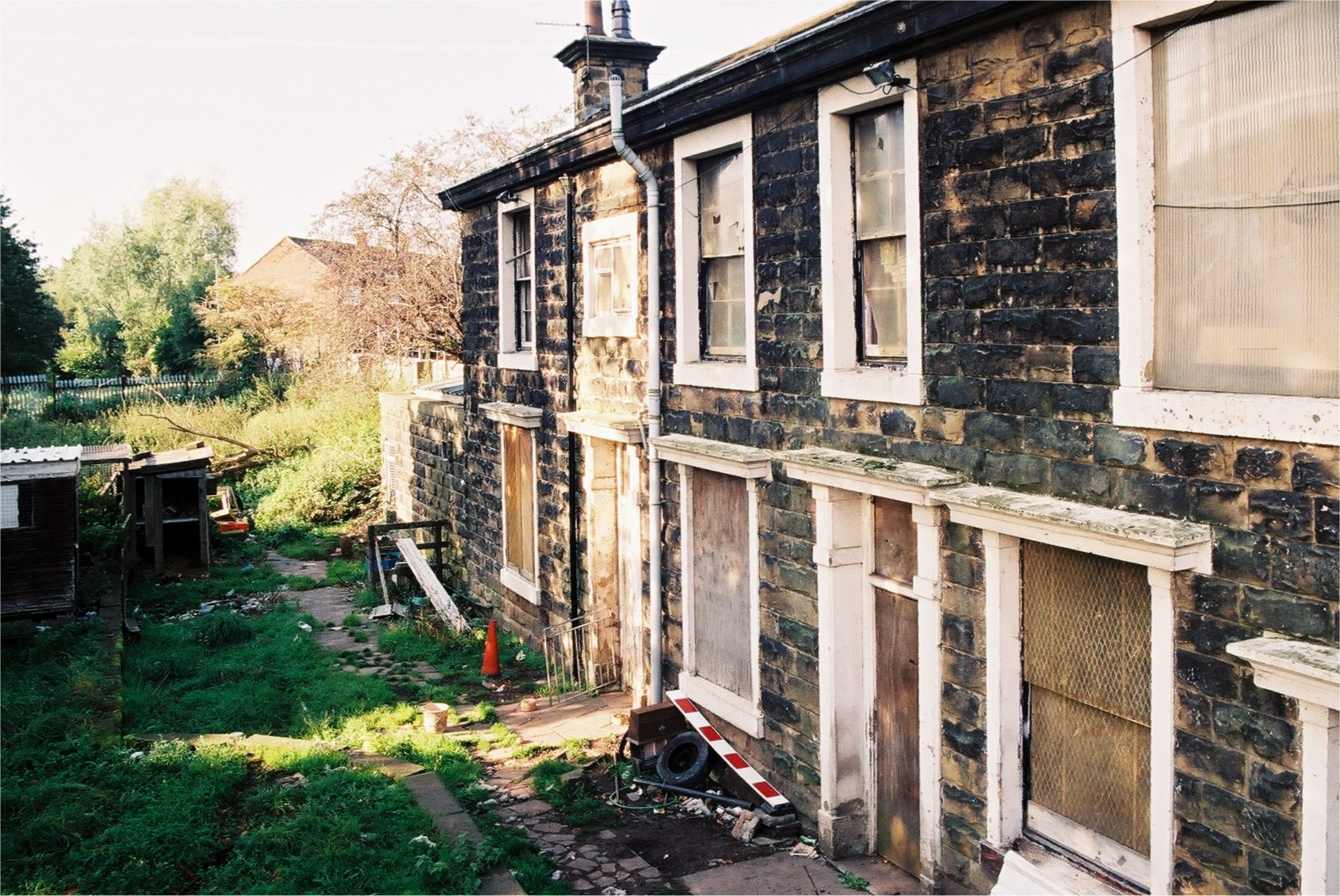
- The former station building in 2007

General information
- Location: Gamull Lane, Ribbleton, Preston; England
- Coordinates: 53.7827°N 2.6587°W
- Platforms: 1

Other information
- Status: Disused

History
- Original company: Preston and Longridge Railway
- Pre-grouping: Lancashire and Yorkshire Railway/London and North Western Railway
- Post-grouping: London, Midland and Scottish Railway

Key dates
- 1854: Opened as Gammer Lane
- 1856: Renamed Fulwood
- 1900: Renamed Ribbleton
- 31 May 1930: Closed
- 1980: Line closed; tracks and bridge removed
Location
- Location within Preston Location within Lancashire

Ribbleton railway station was on the Preston and Longridge Railway in Ribbleton, a suburb of Preston, Lancashire, England.

When the station opened in 1854 it was at first called Gammer Lane (which appears to be a misspelling of Gamull Lane, on which the station was located). Two years later, the line was bought by the Fleetwood, Preston and West Riding Junction Railway and the station was renamed Fulwood Station.

Between 1863 and 1866 there was another short-lived station called Ribbleton, closer to Preston. It was not until 1900 that Fulwood Station was finally renamed Ribbleton Station. The station closed to passengers services in 1930.

The line through the station continued to be used for goods trains to and from Courtaulds Red Scar Works until 1980. After closure the Gamull Lane bridge over the line was removed. The route on either side is now a combined cycle path and footpath. The station building still stands, and was a private house with the former trackbed through its garden until 2021 when it was bought by Preston Trampower, intending to use it as their headquarters.

== Notes ==
Preceding station	Disused railways	Following station
Deepdale Street; Terminus	Preston and Longridge Railway until 1856	Grimsargh towards Longridge
Deepdale towards Preston	L&YR / L&NWR joint Fleetwood, Preston and West Riding Junction Railway from 1856	Grimsargh towards Longridge
