= Maudlands railway station =

Former railway station in England

Maudlands

General information
- Location: Leighton Street, Preston, Preston; England
- Coordinates: 53.7619°N 2.7112°W
- Platforms: 2

Other information
- Status: Disused

History
- Original company: Preston and Wyre Joint Railway
- Pre-grouping: Lancashire and Yorkshire Railway / London and North Western Railway

Key dates
- 15 July 1840: Opened
- 11 February 1844: Closed to passengers except for excursions
- about 1885: Demolished
Location
- Location within Preston city centre Location within Lancashire

Maudlands railway station (also known as Maudland railway station, or Preston Maudland(s)) was the original Preston terminus of the Preston and Wyre Joint Railway to Fleetwood, in Lancashire, England. It was located on Leighton Street. The line and the station opened on 15 July 1840. The line crossed the Lancaster and Preston Junction Railway (L&PJR) on the level, immediately to the west of the station.

By 1844, most of the line's trains were diverted along the L&PJR's line to use the main Preston Station instead. However, Maudlands Station continued to be used for excursions and as a goods station for several decades before its eventual closure and demolition, by 1885, to make way for an extension of the Longridge Branch Line. The remainder of the site was then used for a replacement goods station on the Longridge line which connected from the east.

The site is now occupied by Leighton Hall on Leighton Street and by the University of Central Lancashire’s Roeburn Hall, with the disused Longridge line running between them.

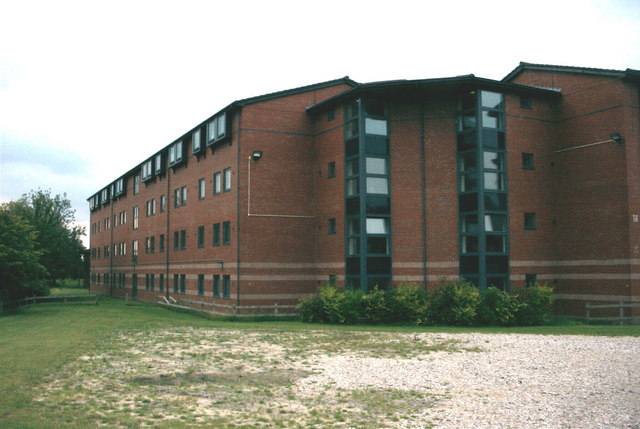
UCLan's Roeburn Hall is on the site of the former station

Railways in the Maudlands area in 1849	1892
Railways in the Maudlands area in 1849	2012
1. Maudlands railway station and first goods station 2. Maudland Bridge railway station 3. Engine shed 4. St Walburge's RC Church; 5. Second Maudland Goods Station from 1885; 6. Roeburn Hall; 7. Leighton Hall

== Temporary station ==
For two days in 1991, the station name "Preston Maudlands" was revived for a temporary platform. It was located on the Blackpool Line adjacent to Tulketh Brow, used as a temporary terminus on 9–10 March 1991 to allow bridge maintenance.

Preceding station	Disused railways	Following station
Lea Road	Preston and Wyre; Joint Railway	Terminus
