= Maudland Bridge railway station =

Former railway station in England

Maudland Bridge
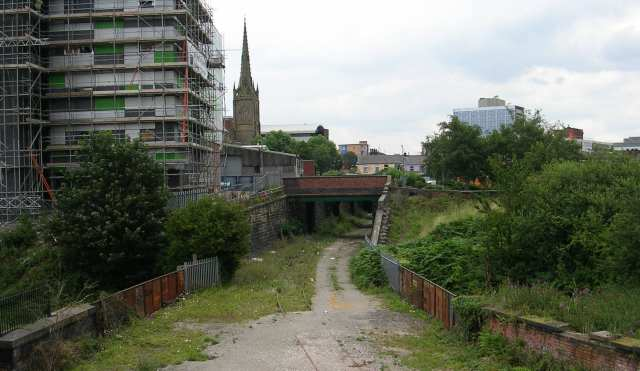
- Site of former station in 2007. The bridge in the foreground was over the Lancaster Canal

General information
- Location: Maudland Road, Preston, Preston; England
- Coordinates: 53.7626°N 2.7103°W
- Platforms: 1

Other information
- Status: Disused

History
- Original company: Fleetwood, Preston and West Riding Junction Railway
- Pre-grouping: Lancashire and Yorkshire Railway/London and North Western Railway

Key dates
- 1 November 1856: Opened
- 1 June 1885: Closed
Location
- Location within Preston city centre Location within Lancashire

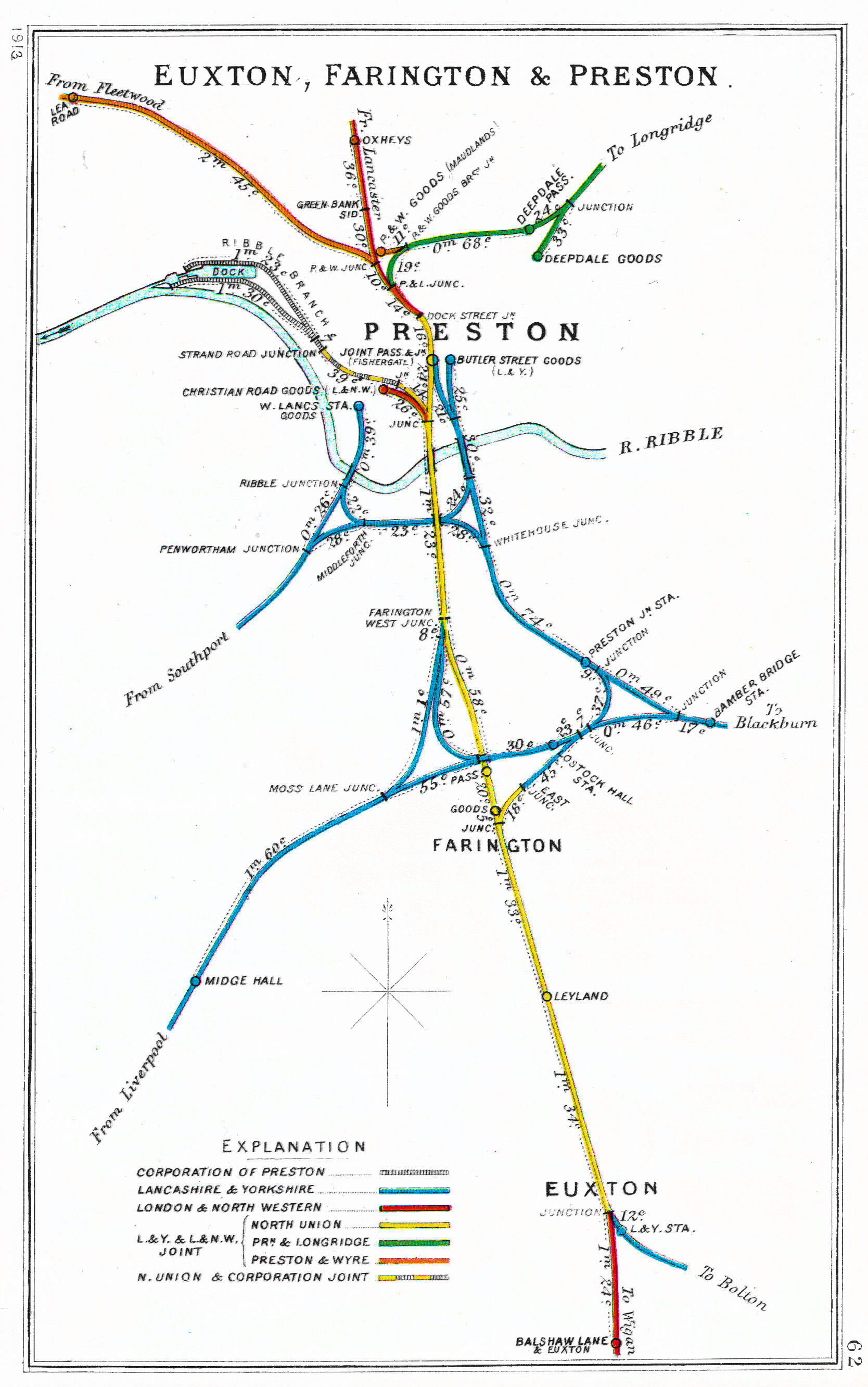
Railways around Preston in 1913

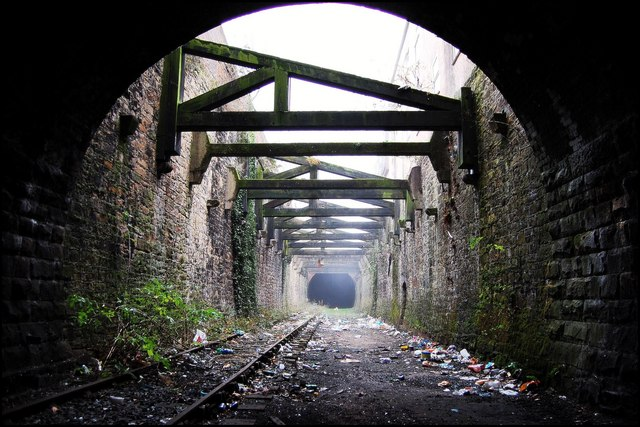
Miley Tunnel

Maudland Bridge railway station was once the Preston terminus of the Longridge Branch Line, in Lancashire, England. It was located on Maudland Road, between a bridge over the Lancaster Canal and Cold Bath Street. The Maudlands district of Preston gets its name from the medieval St. Mary Magdalen's leper hospital, which once stood near the present-day St Walburge's Church.

== History ==
In 1850, the Fleetwood, Preston and West Riding Junction Railway (FP&WRR) built the 862-yard (788 m) Miley Tunnel to connect two existing lines, the Preston and Longridge Railway at Deepdale, and the Preston and Wyre Joint Railway (P&WR) at Maudland. The plan was to link Fleetwood on the Fylde coast to Skipton in the West Riding of Yorkshire. However the plan collapsed in 1852, and so the tunnel was initially used for goods traffic only.

In 1856, the FP&WRR revived and diverted passenger trains via the tunnel to a new Maudland Bridge station. By 1867 the line was owned jointly by the Lancashire and Yorkshire Railway and the London and North Western Railway (LNWR). In 1885, the track layout at Maudland was altered to allow Longridge trains to run on the adjacent LNWR West Coast Main Line to Preston railway station, and Maudland Bridge was closed. A goods station, to replace the demolished P&WR Maudland station, was built nearby.

Although the line through Maudland Bridge station closed to passengers in 1930, it continued to be used for goods until the 1990s. Some of the tracks, now rusty and overgrown, still exist, although the station itself (which was situated on the northern side of Maudlands Street opposite where the University of Central Lancashire's Foster and JB Firth buildings are now located) is long demolished.

== Accidents ==
The disused Miley Tunnel has been the site of several accidents. Two young men were injured in separate incidents in 1998 and 2000, each falling over 30 feet (10 m) into the tunnel off a wall near Moor Lane. On Christmas Day 2002, a drunken youth fell to his death at the same point. Network Rail erected 10-foot (3 m) fences six weeks later.

In October 2003 another drunken man fell onto the disused line at Maudland Bank but escaped serious injury.

== The future ==
In 2003, the Preston City Link Canal Trust was formed with a plan to reopen part of the Lancaster Canal to a new marina to be constructed in the vicinity of the former Maudland Bridge station. One option being considered is to reopen the Longridge line as far as Deepdale or Ribbleton, the line passing by viaduct over the new marina.

Railways in the Maudlands area in 1849	1892
Railways in the Maudlands area in 1849	2012
1. Maudlands railway station and first goods station 2. Maudland Bridge railway station 3. Engine shed 4. St Walburge's RC Church; 5. Second Maudland Goods Station from 1885; 6. Roeburn Hall; 7. Leighton Hall

== Notes ==
Preceding station	Disused railways	Following station
Terminus	LYR/LNWR joint Fleetwood, Preston and West Riding Junction Railway	Deepdale towards Longridge
