= Longridge Fell =

Hill in Lancashire, England

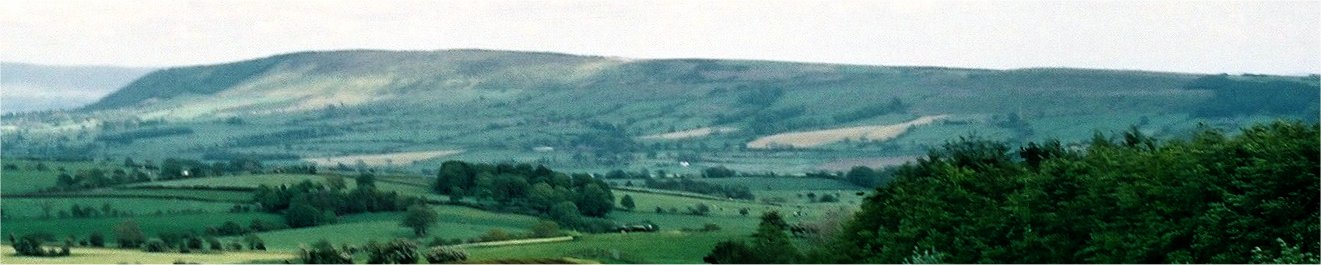
- The east end of Longridge Fell, with Pendle Hill behind, to the left

Highest point
- Elevation: 1,148 ft (350 m)
- Prominence: 794 ft (242 m)
- Parent peak: Ward's Stone
- Listing: Marilyn
- Coordinates: 53°51′51″N 2°31′09″W

Geography
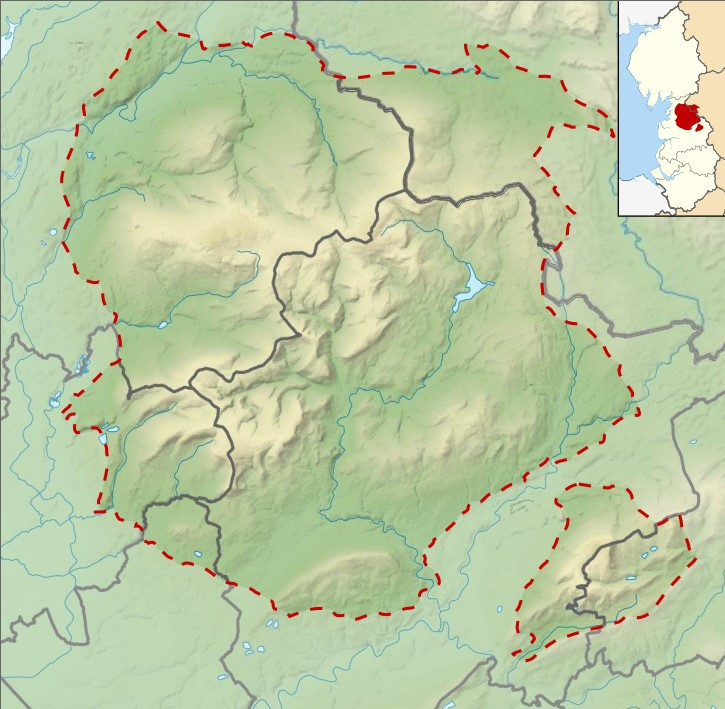
- Location within Lancashire Location within the Borough of Ribble Valley Location within the Forest of Bowland
- Location: Lancashire, England
- OS grid: SD658410

Longridge Fell is the most southerly fell in England, near the town of Longridge, Lancashire. It lies at the southern end of the Forest of Bowland Area of Outstanding Natural Beauty. As its name suggests, it takes the form of a long ridge which rises in a north-easterly direction from within the town of Longridge to its summit 4.5 miles distant. As the ridge curves towards the east, it comes to a sudden end and drops into the Hodder Valley. The fell is an example of a cuesta; the ridge has a sharp drop or escarpment on its northern side, and a gentler, more varying slope on its southern side. These features make it a popular takeoff for hang-gliders and paragliders on the relatively infrequent occurrences of a northerly wind.

From the fell's 1,148-ft (350-m) summit, views are afforded of Preston to the south-west; the Fylde Coast to the west; the Vale of Chipping and the fells of the Forest of Bowland to the north and west (including Parlick, Fair Snape Fell and Beacon Fell); the Yorkshire Dales to the north-east (including, most notably, Pen-y-ghent); Clitheroe, Pendle Hill and Whalley, to the east and south-east; and Winter Hill and the West Pennine Moors and the BAE Systems factory at Samlesbury Aerodrome. On clear days, the Lake District and sometimes the Isle of Man can be seen to the north-west, and the Snowdonia mountain range to the south-west.

The River Hodder and its tributary, the River Loud, flow eastward along the north side of the fell, before turning south at the end of the fell to join the River Ribble, which runs westward along the south of the fell. Cowley Brook, a tributary of Stydd Brook, begins its course near the fell. The village of Hurst Green and the adjoining Stonyhurst College lie on the south side of the fell.

Longridge town lies at the south-west end of the fell. There were once extensive stone quarries at Tootle Heights, now mostly built on apart from a deep rocky water-filled remnant off the Tan Yard bridlepath, and the reservoirs. The Dilworth Upper Reservoir between the roads where Forty Acre Lane branches off Higher Road, leading from Longridge up the fell. Forty Acre Lane leads towards Jeffrey Hill, the name for a small part of the western section of the fell, via Longridge Golf Club, whose clubhouse doubles as the home of the Preston Wheelers Cycling Club. Below Tootle Heights are the Spade Mill Reservoirs.

== Gallery ==
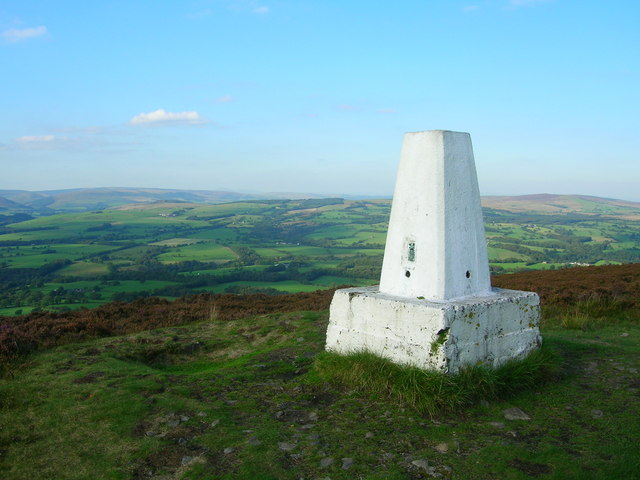
The trig point at the summit of Longridge Fell, looking north

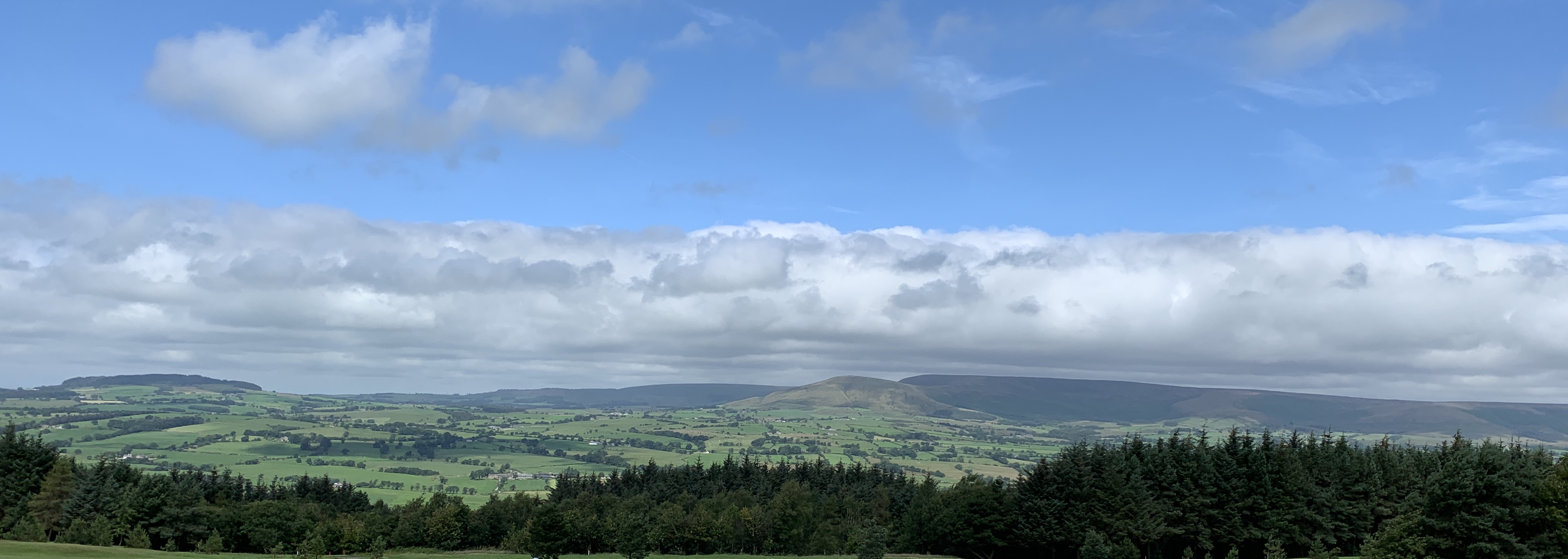
A view from the northern section of Longridge golf course across the Vale of Chipping to Parlick and Fair Snape Fell

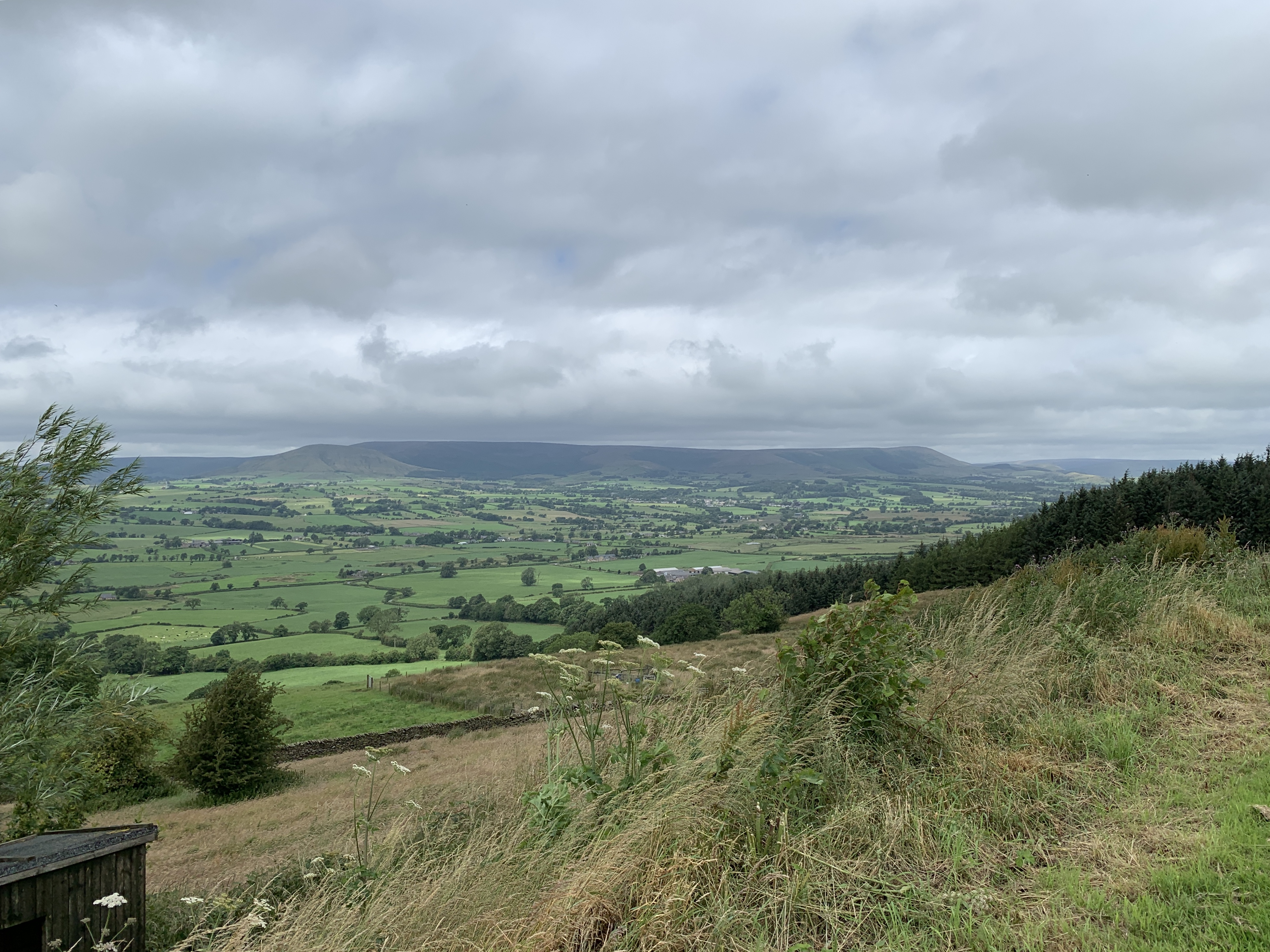
View over the Vale of Chipping

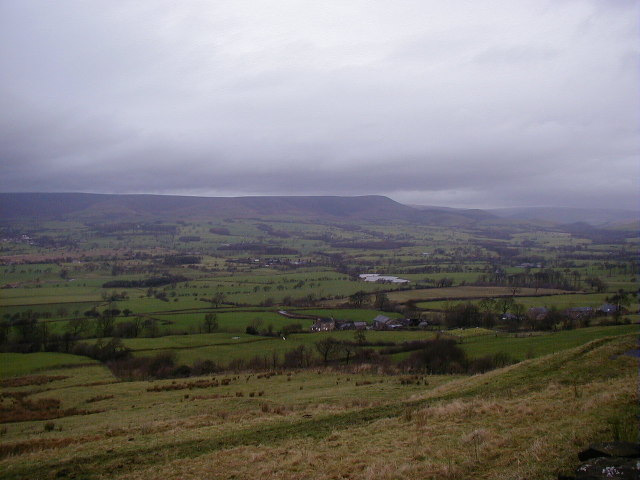
View north over the Loud Valley

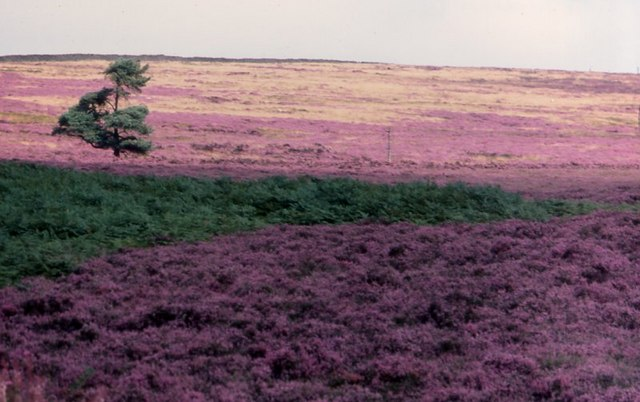
The western slopes of the fell, around Jeffrey Hill
