= Longridge Golf Club =

Golf club in Lancashire, England

- The golf club's logo reflects its history with Preston Cycling Club

- Location in Lancashire
- 53.8462°N 2.5706°W

Club information
- Location: Fell Barn, Forty Acre Lane, Longridge Fell, Longridge, England
- Established: 1915 (111 years ago)
- Type: Public
- Tota holes: 18
- Website: https://www.longridgegolfclub.co.uk/

Course
- Par: 70
- Length: 5,904 yards

Longridge Golf Club, in Longridge, England, was founded around 1915, making it one of the oldest golf clubs in the county of Lancashire. Situated on Longridge Fell's Forty Acre Lane, the elevation of the clubhouse is 744 feet (227 m), which is about 400 feet below that of the fell's peak. It is a par 70, 5,904-yard course.

== Course ==
The course became eighteen holes, from its original nine, in 1971. Four of these holes (1, 2, 17 and 18) are located on the southern side of Forty Acre Lane and run north–south or south–north; the other fourteen, on the northern side of the road, follow the ridge of the fell, allowing for largely 180-degree views of not only the immediate West Lancashire area (most prominently the Vale of Chipping) but also into the Yorkshire Dales to the northeast.

== History ==
Preston Cycling Club, who were looking for a new home, merged with the already established golf club on 17 March 1917. It was known as Preston Cycling Club and Longridge Golf Club until the 1960s, and the golf club's logo still references this connection.

== Gallery ==
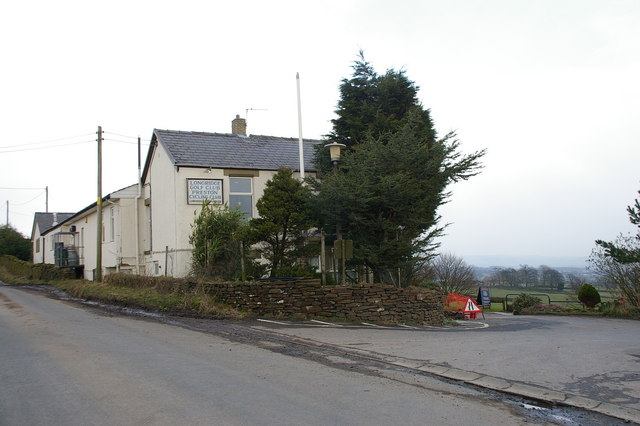
The clubhouse, Fell Barn, pictured in 2006

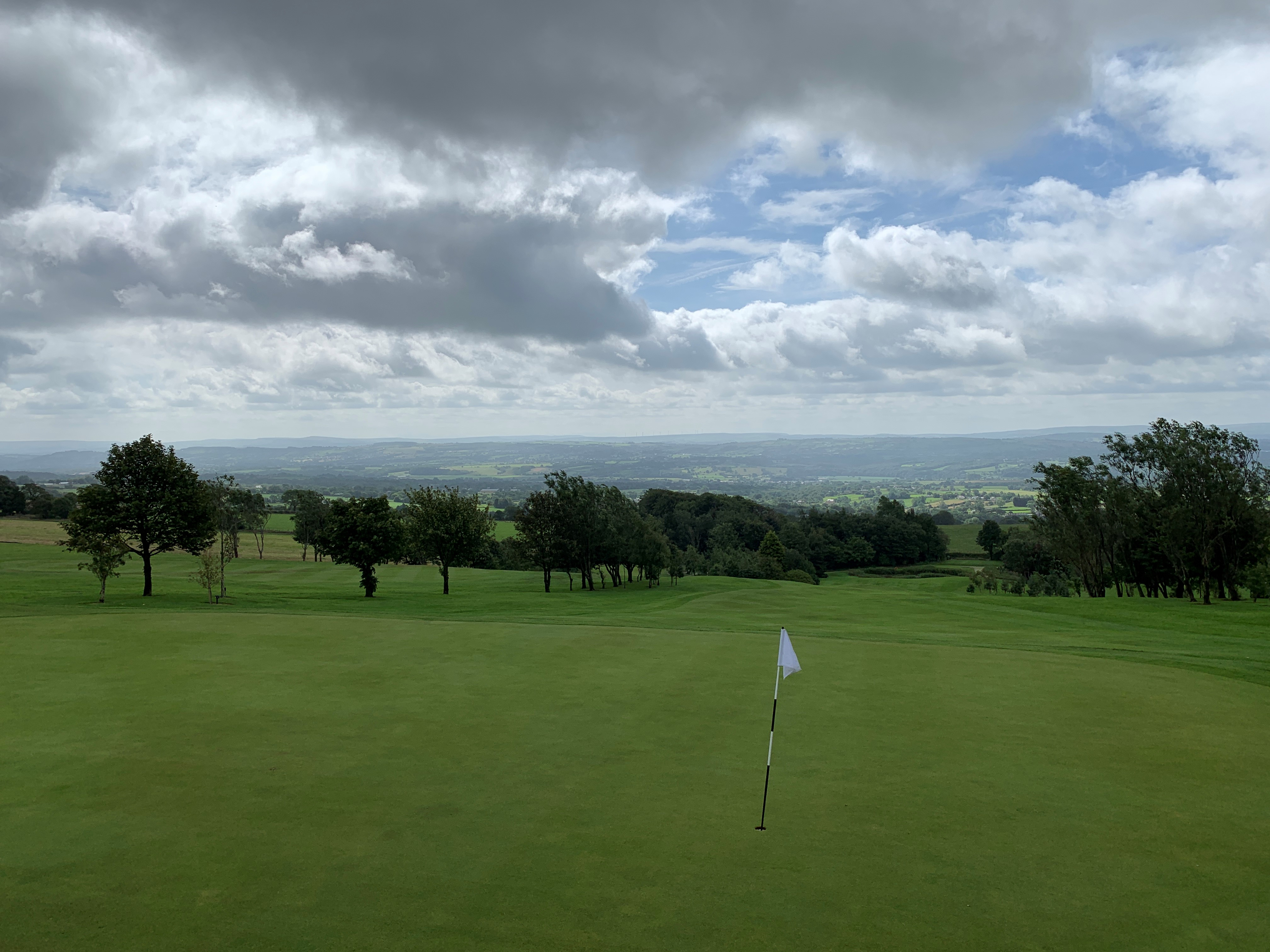
One of the four greens on the southern section of the course

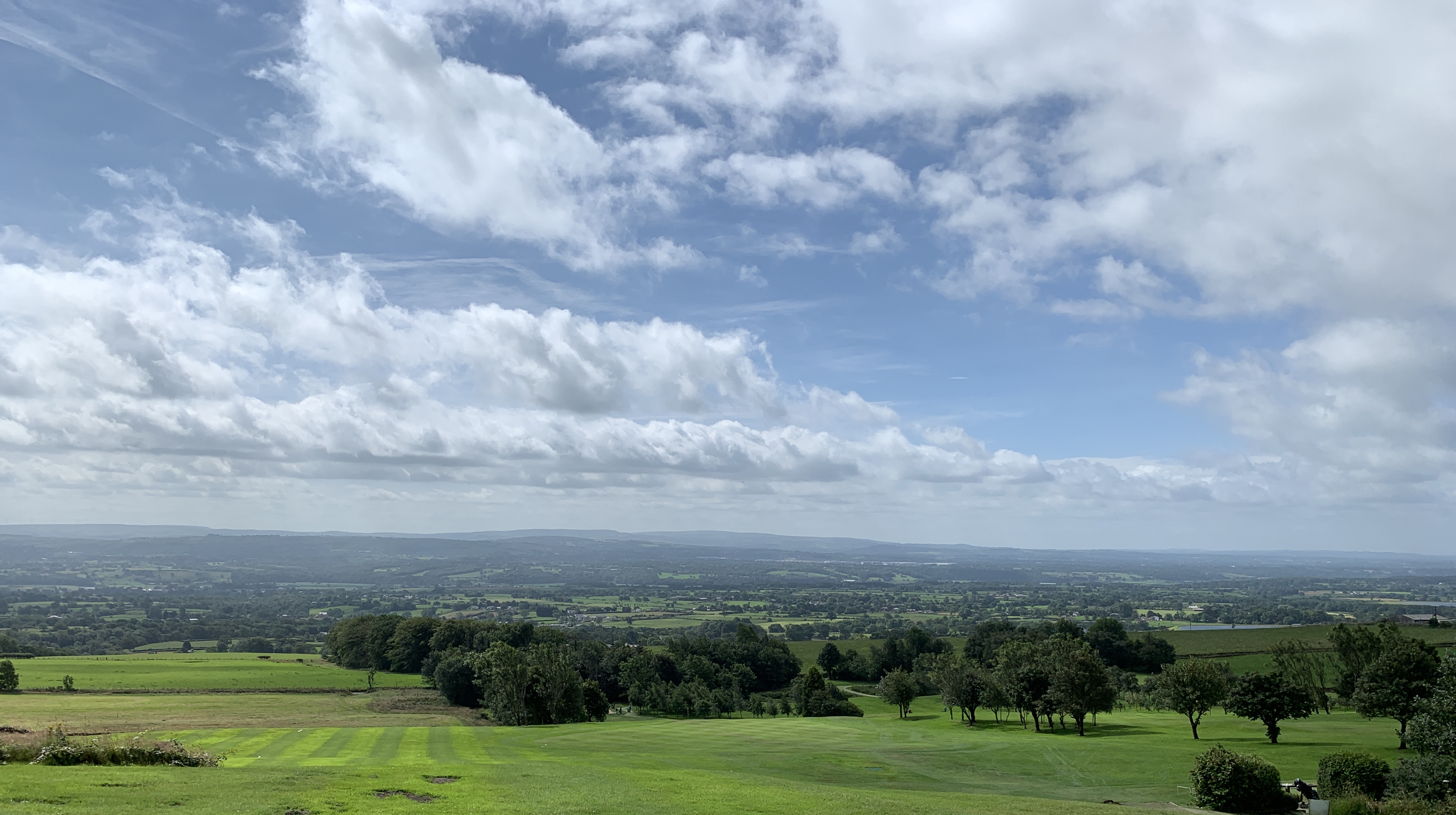
Looking south towards Blackburn

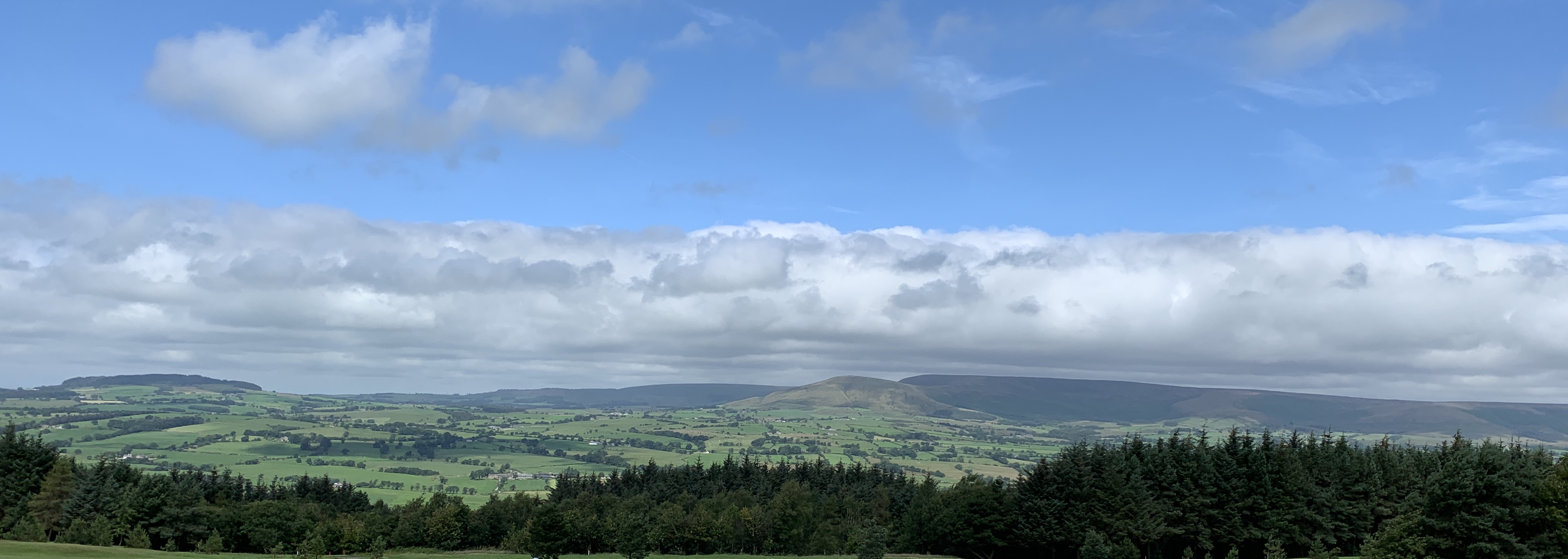
A view from the northern side of Forty Acre Lane across the Vale of Chipping to Parlick and Fair Snape Fell

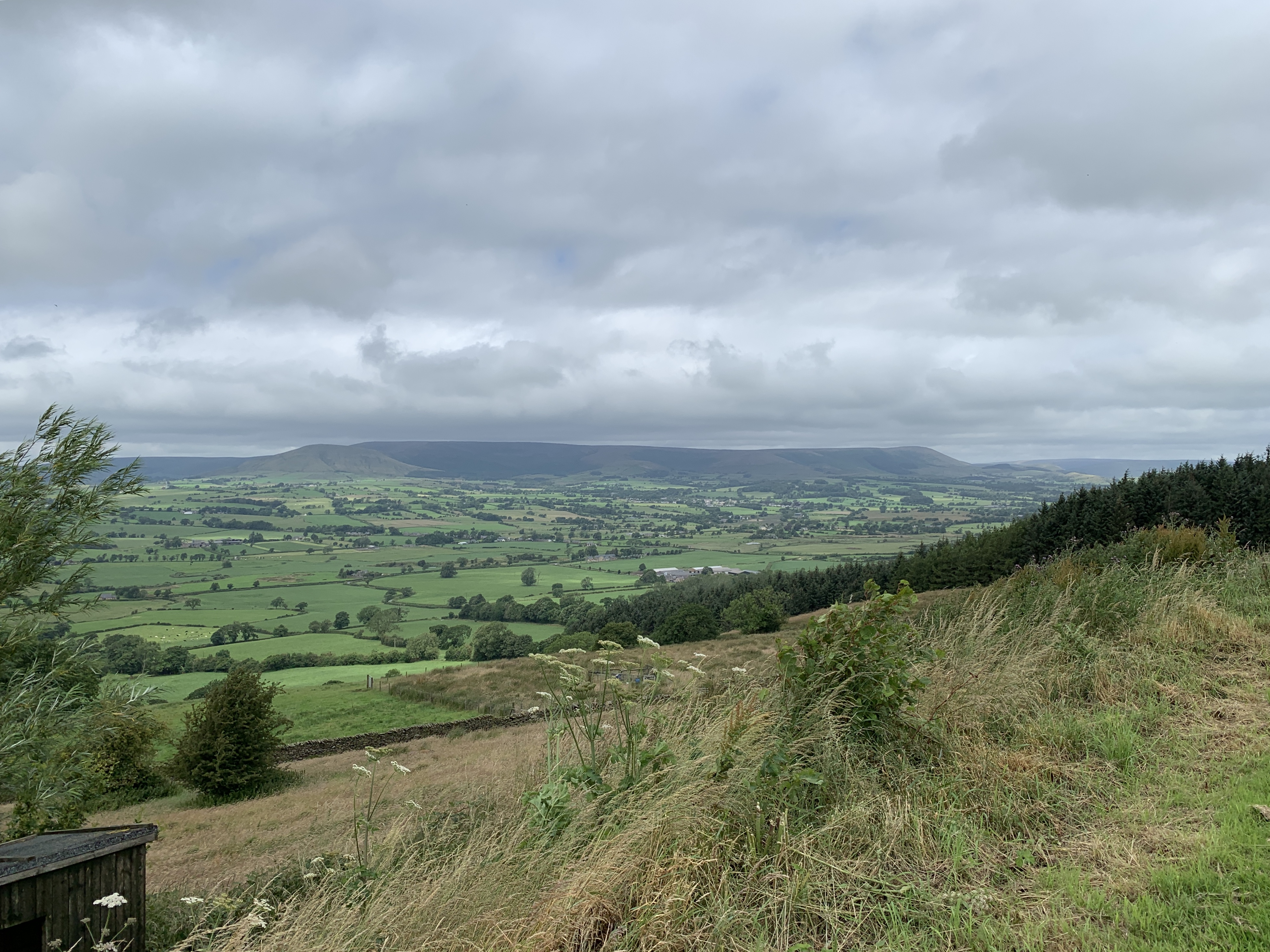
Towards the Yorkshire Dales
