= Longridge Circuit =

Motor racing circuit in Longridge, England

- Longridge Circuit (1973–1978)
- Location: Longridge, Lancashire, England
- Coordinates: 53°50′13″N 2°35′13″W
- Opened: 29 April 1973; 53 years ago
- Closed: September 1978; 47 years ago

Longridge Circuit (1973–1978)
- Length: 0.692 km (0.430 mi)
- Race lap record: 0:23.600 ( (United Kingdom) Kim Mather, BRM P153, 1973, F1)

Longridge Circuit was a motor racing circuit built in the former Tootle Heights quarry close to Longridge, Lancashire, England.
