= Courtaulds Red Scar Works Preston =

Former artificial fibre factory in the UK

Coordinates: 53°47′04″N 2°38′43″W

Red Scar Works was built in 1939 by Courtaulds and produced continuous filament viscose rayon. It was located in Ribbleton, Preston, off Longridge Road. The closure of the works was announced in November 1979 and the issue raised in the UK Parliament House of Commons by the constituency MP. At the time of closure, approximately 2,600 people were employed there, but there were approximately 4,000 at its peak. It was at one time the largest rayon producing site in Britain. Two main products were manufactured: one being tyre yarn made by a process known as CSPT (Continuous Spinning Process), trademarked Tenasco, in two principle deniers; the other being a general-purpose textile yarn called Bright. A range of deniers of this were produced; pigmented variants were Matt (pigmented with titanium dioxide) and a wide range of colours trademarked Duracol (including Duracol Black, pigmented with carbon black). At the time of closure, one reason given by management for the closure was the rising popularity of steel belt radial tyres, thus reducing demand for viscose tyre yarn.

The factory was connected by rail as a branch of what was the Preston and Longridge Railway. The plant had its own power production facility. The main raw materials brought in by rail were coal, sulfuric acid, sodium hydroxide, carbon disulphide and wood pulp.

== Buildings on site ==
The site had its own power station which was coal burning and a boiler house and turbine room housing Parsons Peebles turbines. Unusually it generated at two different frequencies, the usual 50 Hz, and 120 Hz for the very large number of 'spindle motors' within the rayon spinning machines. The power station had two cooling towers and two large chimneys which were very visible points on the Preston landscape. The cooling towers were very close to the Preston By-pass, now part of the M6 motorway. As well as a laboratory there was a textile testing room, boiler house, turbine room, box spinning, CSPT, effluent plant, acid recovery, zinc recovery, churn room, mixing room, dialyzer house, maintenance workshop, offices, cake ageing rooms, coning, cakewash, carbon disulfide mixing arc, steeping room, mercerizing room, condux mill passage, fume scrubbing and viscose alley containing east and west viscose ageing and storage caves

== Chemical processes ==
Rayon production was by the viscose process. This started by taking cellulose in the form of wood pulp and steeping in caustic soda solution. The caustic soda was then drained and the pulp sheets pressed to remove residual alkali. The product is sodium cellulose hydroxide at this stage. The pressings and caustic soda were recovered by dialysis in the dialyser house. The steeped wood pulp sheets were then shredded with Condux mills and the product (called alkcell short for alkaline cellulose) stored in bins at controlled temperature. After suitable ageing, carbon disulfide was added and mixed in churns in the churn room to produce an orange coloured xanthate, chemically sodium cellulose xanthate. The contents were then dropped into mixers in the mixing room and dilute caustic soda added and mixed for a length of time. This viscous liquid was then passed through granulators to grind up the chunks of xanthate. This viscous liquid – viscose – was then filtered, deaerated, and passed into storage tanks in the viscose caves in controlled temperature and ageing conditions. The next stage is spinning of the yarn. In spinning, whether box spinning or CSPT, the principle is the same. Viscose is extruded through a spinneret into a batch of hot dilute acid also containing sodium sulphate and zinc sulphate along with other additives. Rayon was produced and loaded onto cakes of yarn or bobbins in the case of CSPT. In the case of Duracol, pigment was injected into the viscose just before spinning, creating a dye-fast yarn.

The hot spent dilute acid from the spin baths was sent for recycling in the acid recovery building. Other waste acidic streams were sent to the zinc recovery building where the liquors were passed into tanks containing ion-exchange resin. The recycled product was an acid stream rich in zinc sulfate which was fed back into the hot dilute acid baths by means of weirs. Cakes of yarn were aged in controlled heat and humidity ageing cabinets and then sent through the cakewash process. This consisted of prewashes and then washing with sodium sulfide solution. A rinse then bleach wash (sodium hypochlorite washes) followed by another very dilute acid wash to remove the bleach and finally, rinsing was then performed. The yarn was then dried in tunnel drier ovens. After this the yarn was sent to coning where the yarn was threaded onto cones for ease of handling and sale.

== See also ==
- Courtaulds production sites

== Gallery ==
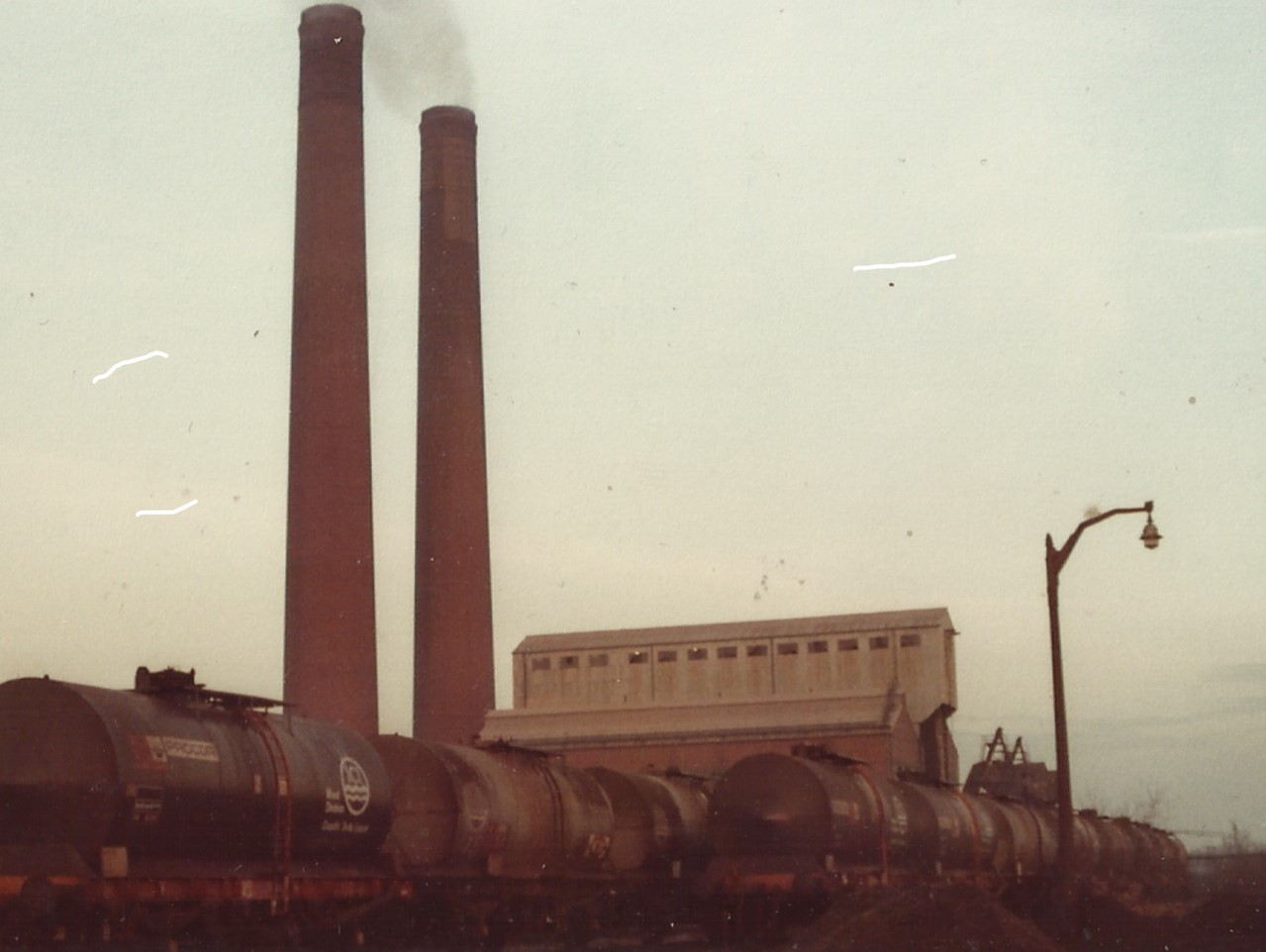
View of Courtaulds Chimneys with Boiler House visible in background and a caustic soda tank train delivering

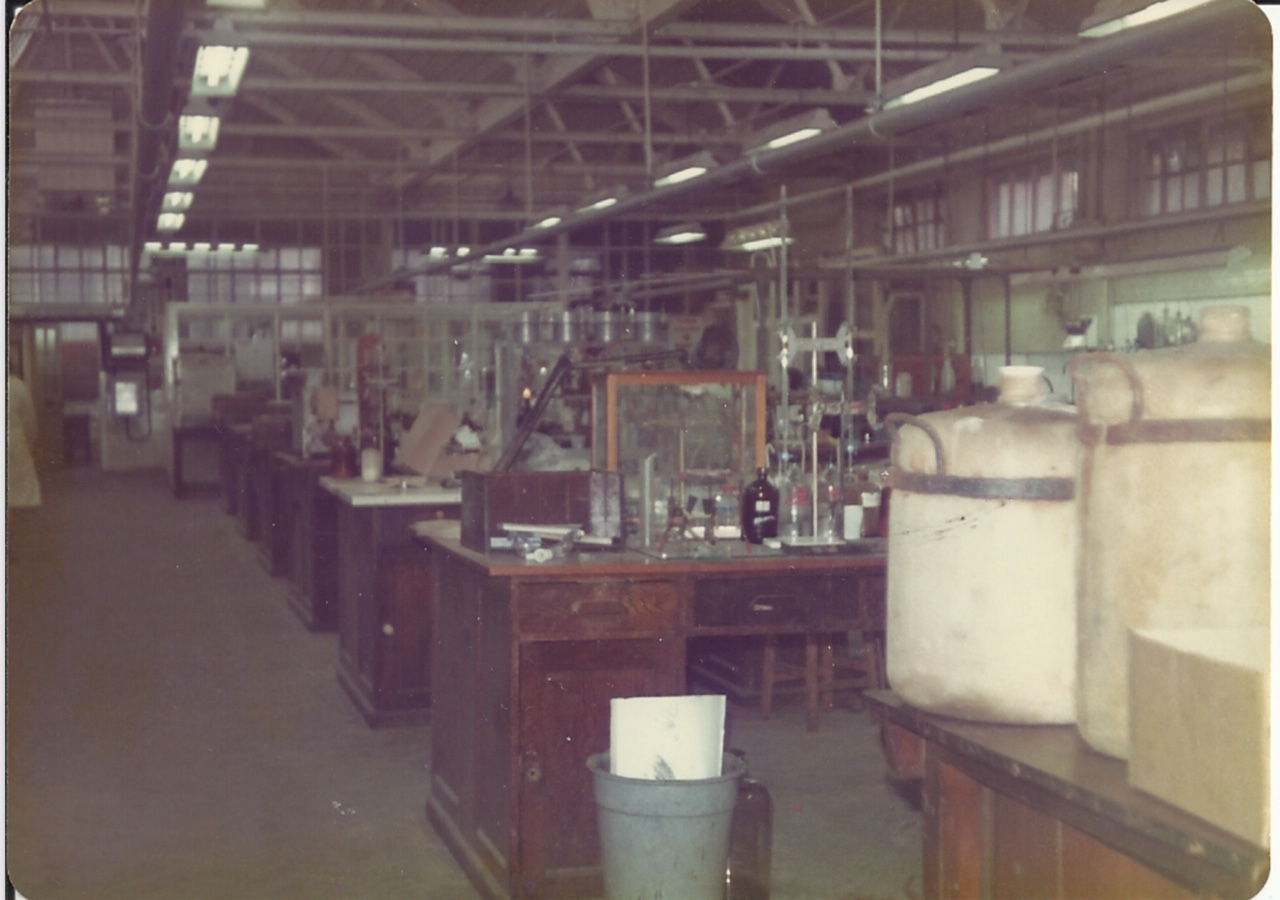
Courtaulds Red Scar Works Laboratory

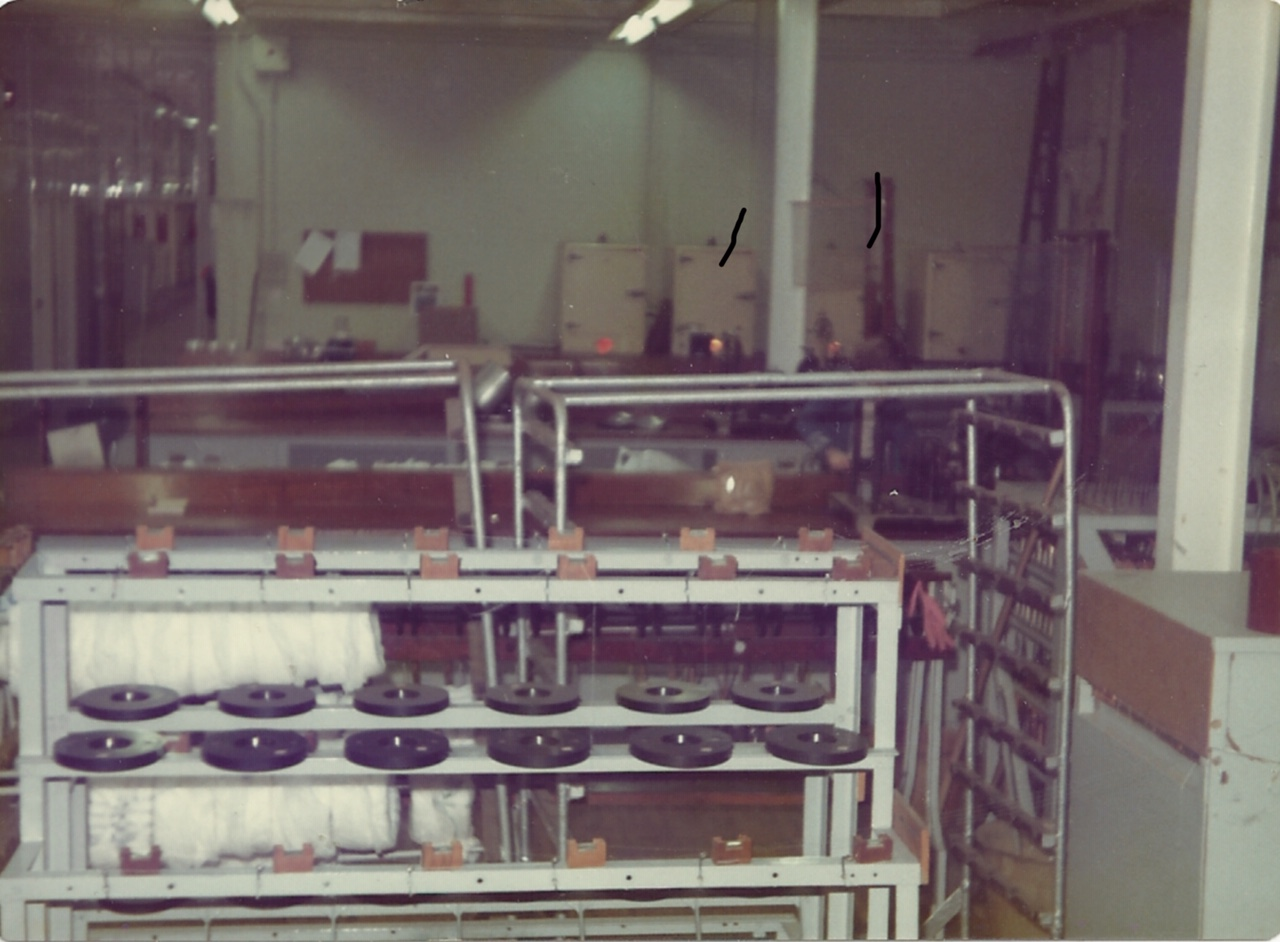
Courtaulds Red Scar Works textile testing room

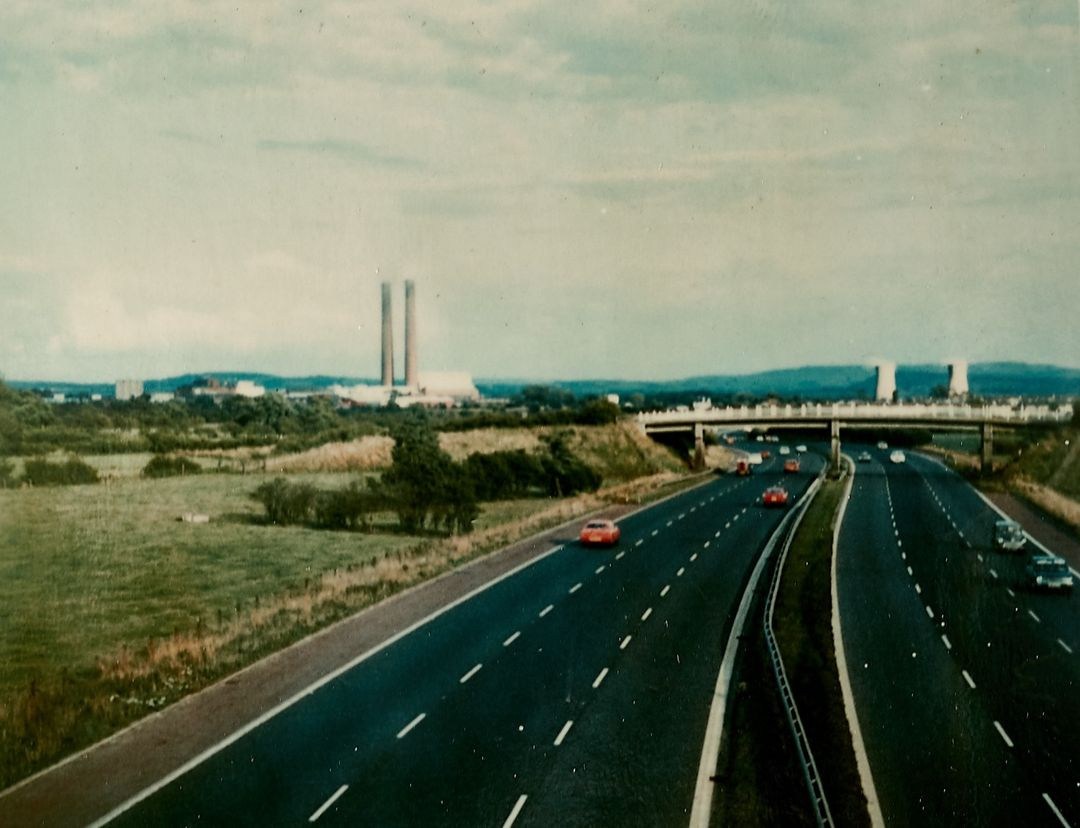
Courtaulds Red Scar Works viewed from the M6 motorway

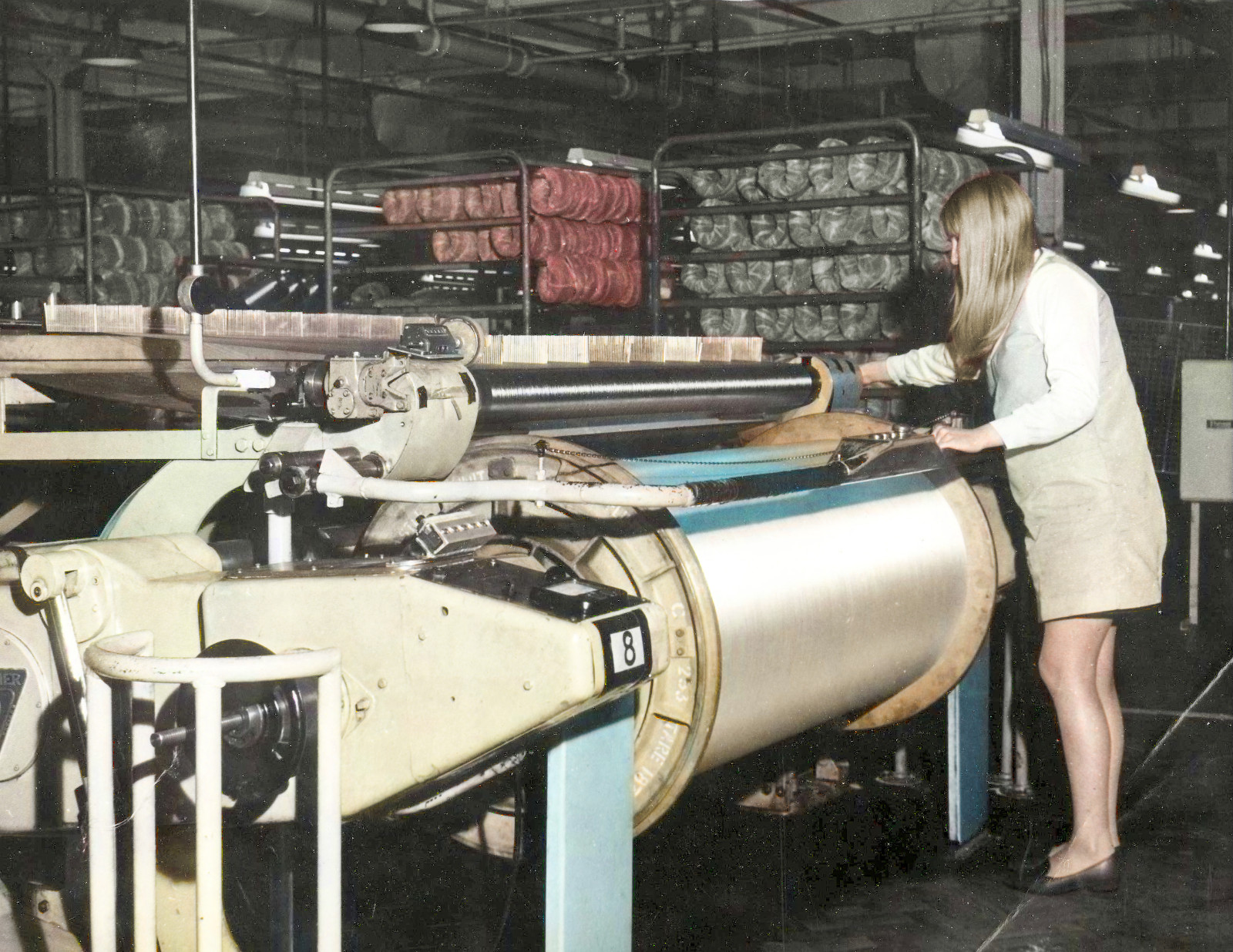
Beaming machine at Red Scar Works

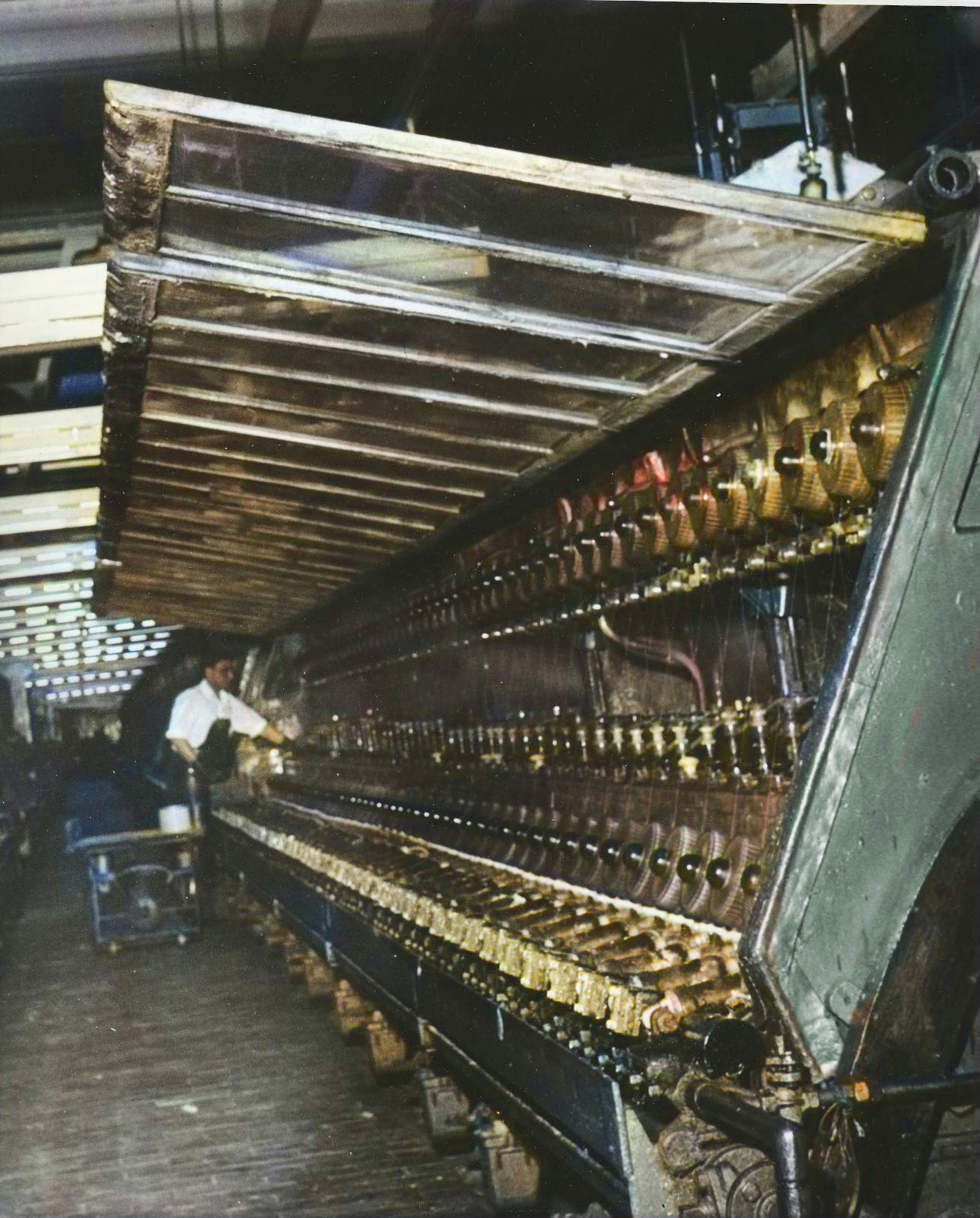
Box Spinning at Red Scar Works in its heyday

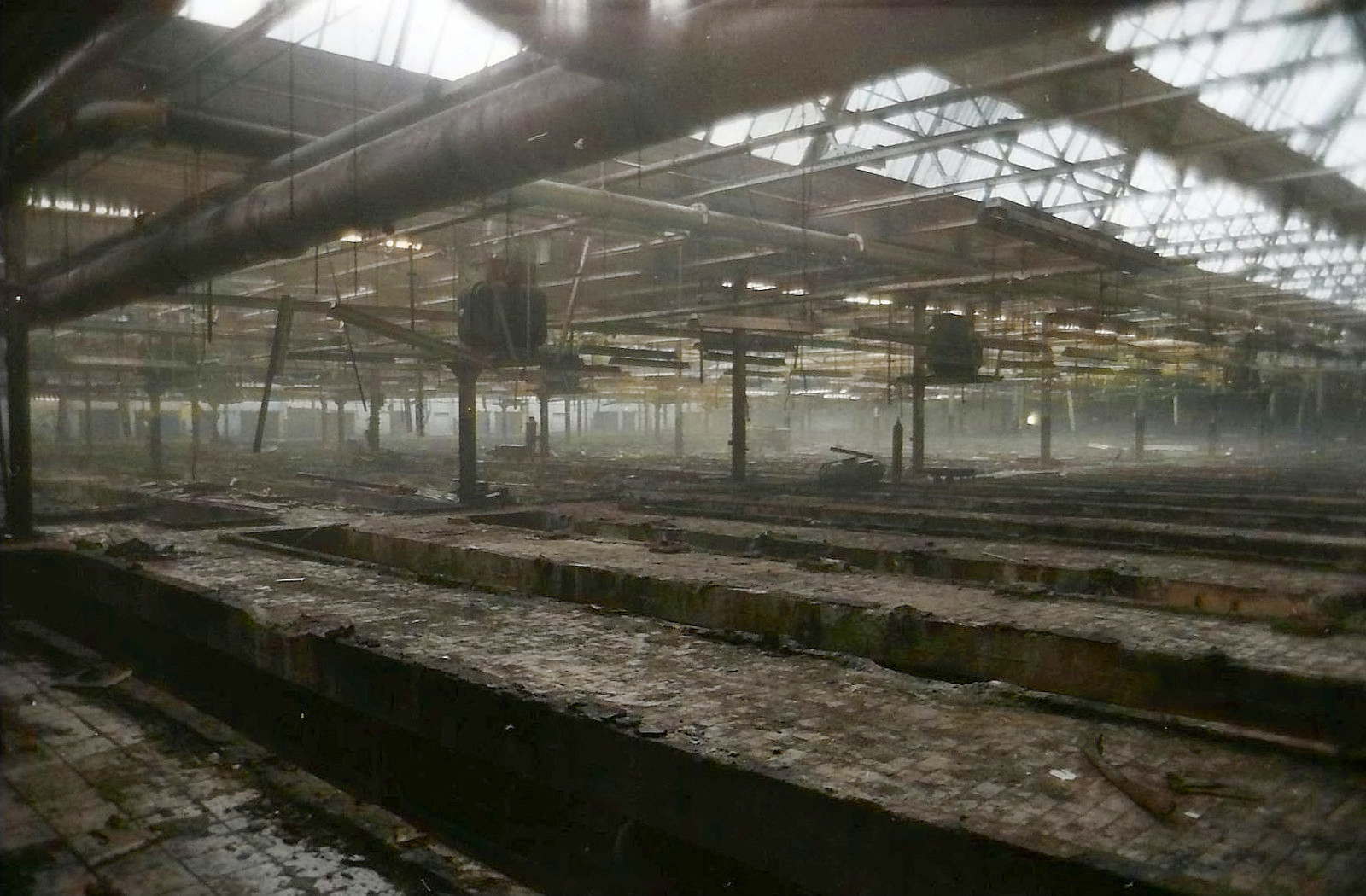
Box spinning at Red Scar works after closure

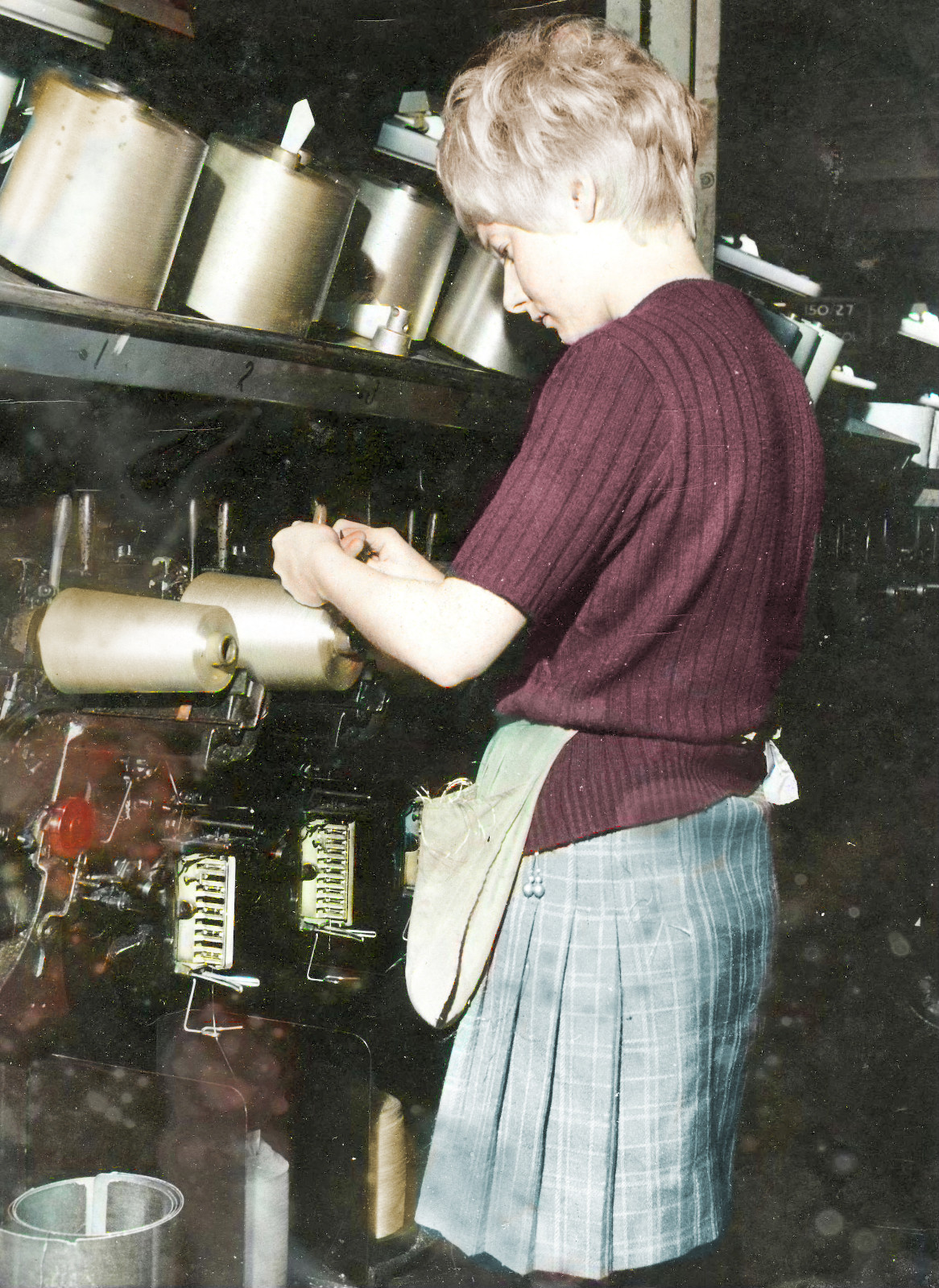
Coning machine at Red Scar Works coning bright rayon fibre onto a cone

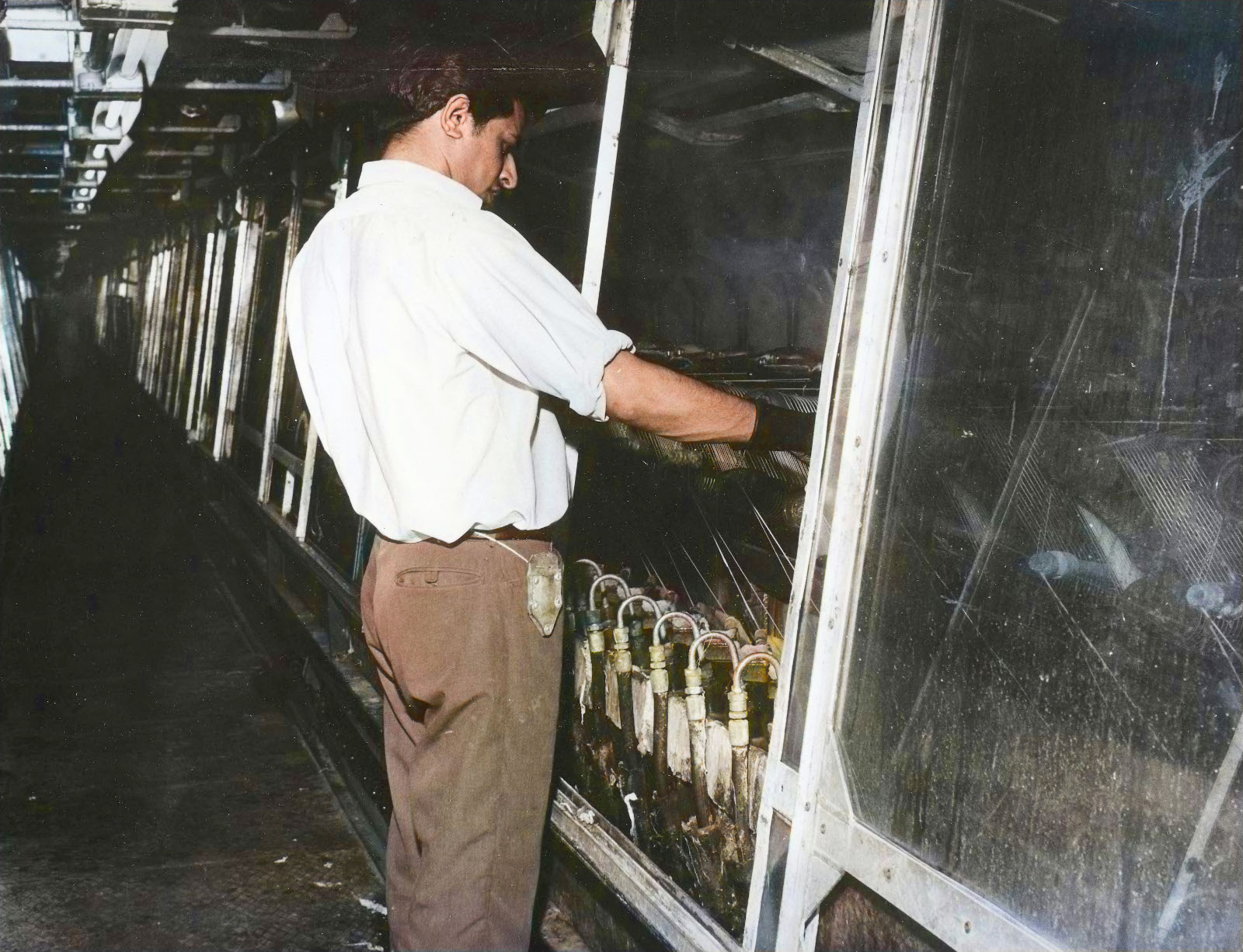
CSPT machine at Red Scar Works
