= Preston and Longridge Railway =

Disused railway line in Lancashire, England

The Preston and Longridge Railway (P&LR) was a branch line in Lancashire, England. Originally designed to carry quarried stone in horse-drawn wagons, it became part of an ambitious plan to link the Lancashire coast to the heart of Yorkshire. The ambition was never achieved, but the line continued to carry passengers until 1930 and goods until 1967.

== Early history ==
Preston and Longridge Railway Act 1836
- Act of Parliament
- Parliament of the United Kingdom
- Long title: An Act for making and maintaining a Railway from Preston to Longridge in the County Palatine of Lancaster.
- Citation: 6 & 7 Will. 4. c. cxxii

Dates
- Royal assent: 14 July 1836

Text of statute as originally enacted

The Preston and Longridge Railway Company was set up by the Preston and Longridge Railway Act 1836 (6 & 7 Will. 4. c. cxxii) to build a tramway from the newly opened Tootle Heights Quarry in Longridge to Preston. The 6½-mile (10½ km) single-track line was opened on 1 May 1840, with crude passenger facilities at Longridge, Grimsargh and Deepdale Street in Preston.

Wagons were horse-drawn from Preston uphill to Longridge. Wagons ran by gravity in the opposite direction as far as Ribbleton, which was then a village just outside Preston. Horses were used for the final two miles (3 km) to Deepdale. Longridge ashlar sandstone was widely used in the region, for example in the building of Lancaster Town Hall, Bolton Town Hall, Preston railway station and Liverpool Docks.

== Development ==
In 1846, the Fleetwood, Preston and West Riding Junction Railway (FP&WRR) was set up. It had an ambitious plan to link Fleetwood on the Lancashire coast to Leeds and Bradford in the West Riding of Yorkshire. It would link the existing Preston and Wyre Joint Railway to the Longridge line in Preston, and build a new line from Grimsargh via Ribchester, Hurst Green and Clitheroe to Skipton, where it would join the proposed Leeds and Bradford Extension Railway. The line would give Lancashire passengers access to the spa towns of Harrogate and Knaresborough, and beauty spots such as Bolton Abbey. Reciprocally, it would give Yorkshire passengers access to the seaside resorts of Fleetwood and Blackpool. Freight trains would carry cattle from Craven Valley, and stone from quarries near Clitheroe as well as from Longridge. Stonyhurst College would be within a mile of the line and would be able to use it to bring in supplies as well as pupils.

The P&LR was duly leased to the FP&WRR. The line was adapted for steam and the first steam-hauled train ran on Whit Monday 1848.

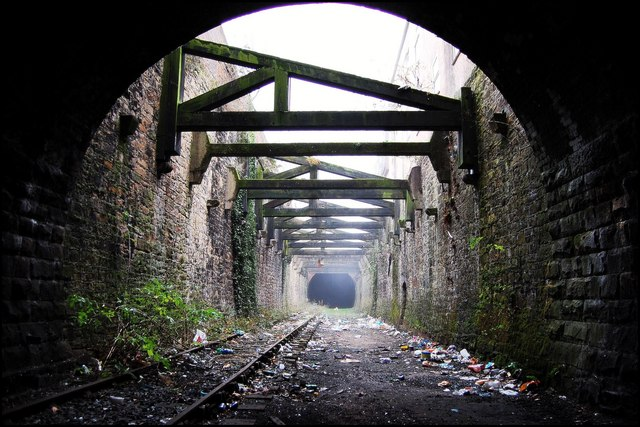
Miley Tunnel

In 1850, a double-track extension was built connecting to the existing line a few hundred yards east of the Deepdale Street terminus. The line passed via the 862-yard (788 m) Miley Tunnel under the north part of Preston and connected to the Preston and Wyre Joint Railway very close to that line's original terminus at Maudlands. The extension was initially used for goods only.

The first work on the Grimsargh to Skipton line was the excavation of a short cutting (which still exists) south of Hurst Green (at 53.827385°N 2.484603°W), but then the project was abandoned. In 1852, the Fleetwood, Preston and West Riding Junction Railway Company collapsed. The Preston and Longridge Railway acquired the engines and rolling stock of the collapsed company in lieu of owed rental fees.

Fleetwood, Preston and West Riding Junction Railway Act 1856
- Act of Parliament
- Parliament of the United Kingdom
- Long title: An Act for regulating the Capital of the Fleetwood, Preston, and West Riding Junction Railway Company, for making further Provision with respect to Tolls to be taken on the Railway, and for other Purposes.
- Citation: 19 & 20 Vict. c. xliv

Dates
- Royal assent: 23 June 1856

Text of statute as originally enacted

However, in 1856 a reformed Fleetwood, Preston and West Riding Junction Railway Company purchased the line. The line through Miley Tunnel was opened to passengers, with new stations at each end, at Deepdale Bridge on Deepdale Road and at Maudland Bridge. The original Deepdale Street terminus was closed to passengers but continued to be used for goods.

London and North Western and Lancashire and Yorkshire Railways (Fleetwood, Preston and West Riding Junction Railway Vesting) Act 1867
- Act of Parliament
- Parliament of the United Kingdom
- Long title: An Act for vesting the Undertaking of the Fleetwood, Preston, and West Riding Junction Railway Company in the London and North-western Railway Company and the Lancashire and Yorkshire Railway Company; and for other Purposes.
- Citation: 30 & 31 Vict. c. xcv

Dates
- Royal assent: 17 June 1867

Text of statute as originally enacted

By 1866, the plan to extend the line to Yorkshire had been revived. Fearing that the rival Midland Railway would buy the line to gain access to Preston, the Lancashire and Yorkshire Railway (L&YR) bought the line instead. From the passing of the London and North Western and Lancashire and Yorkshire Railways (Fleetwood, Preston and West Riding Junction Railway Vesting) Act 1867 (30 & 31 Vict. c. xcv), the line became owned jointly by the L&YR and the London and North Western Railway (LNWR).

In 1885, Maudland Bridge Station was closed and passenger trains ran on to the adjacent LNWR main line to Preston Station, allowing connections to other railway lines for the first time.

== Whittingham Hospital branch ==
In June 1889, a private branch line was opened northwards from Grimsargh to Whittingham Asylum two miles (3 km) away. As well as supplies, hospital staff and visitors were carried free of charge in converted goods brake vans. Trains (as many as twelve per day) were timed to connect with passenger trains at Grimsargh.

The locomotives used on the hospital branch were industrial types with the exception of the ex-London, Brighton and South Coast Railway no. 357, Riddlesdown, which was purchased in February 1948 from British Railways for £745.

The hospital line continued to operate long after the main branch closed to passengers in 1930. The hospital trains were now timed to connect with bus services at Grimsargh. The line eventually closed on 29 June 1957.

== Decline ==
In 1918 there was another plan to extend the railway from Longridge to Yorkshire along the Loud and Hodder valleys to Whitewell, Tosside, Wigglesworth and Hellifield, but the plan was never implemented. This plan was revived once more in 1924 in connection with the Stocks Reservoir scheme and the Longridge and Hellifield Light Railway Order 1924 was confirmed on 19 March, however no further action was taken.

By 1930 the popularity of bus travel caused the line to close to passengers. The line to Longridge remained open to goods traffic until November 1967.

Goods traffic continued to use part of the line as far as the Courtaulds factory at Red Scar, until the last train worked by class 25 diesel, number 25 142 on Friday 8 February 1980. The Gamull Lane bridge over the line at Ribbleton was subsequently removed. All that now remained of the whole line was a Y-shaped link between the West Coast Main Line and coal yards at the site of the original Deepdale Street terminus. This, too, was closed in the 1990s, although the tracks for this section were never taken up.

== Remains ==
The track through Miley Tunnel, though rusty and overgrown, still exists.

The line's route in Preston between Blackpool Road and Red Scar is now a cycle path and footpath. It is planned to extend the path to Grimsargh.

In Longridge, a portal to a blocked-off tunnel under Higher Road that led to Tootle Heights Quarry is a Grade II listed building. The station buildings at Longridge and Ribbleton still survive.

In 2003, the Preston City Link Canal Trust was formed with a plan to reopen part of the Lancaster Canal to a new marina to be constructed in the vicinity of the former Maudland Bridge railway station. One option being considered was to reopen the Longridge line as far as Deepdale or Ribbleton, the line passing by viaduct over the new marina.

In 2010, light rail manufacturer Trampower UK opened negotiations to use a segment of the former route as a tram demonstrator line. Initially, Trampower UK would have used the line from the Miley Tunnel portal to Ribbleton, although the company's long-term ambition was to provide a service on the line from the M6 Junction 31A to Preston city centre.
