= Ribbleton =

Area of Preston, Lancashire, England

Coordinates: 53.773°N 2.654°W

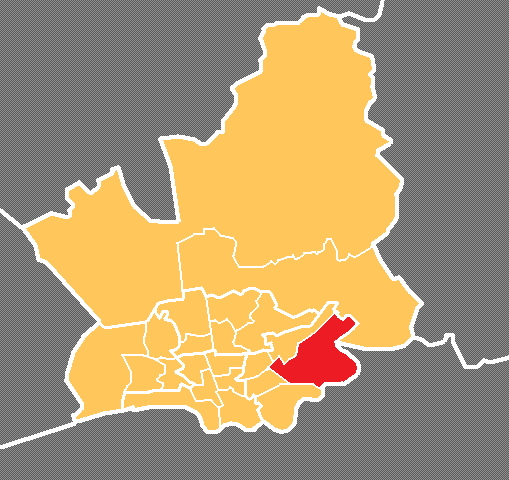
- Ward location in the City of Preston district

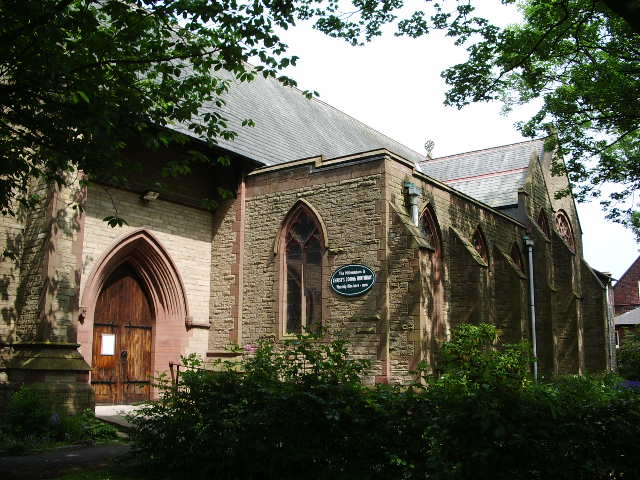

- Location in Preston Location within Lancashire
- Population: 8,548 (2011)
- District: Preston
- Ceremonial county: Lancashire
- Region: North West
- Country: England
- Sovereign state: United Kingdom
- UK Parliament: Preston
- Councillors: Nicholas Pomfret – Labour; Brian Rollo – Labour; Jonathan Saksena – Labour

Ribbleton is a suburb and ward of the city of Preston, Lancashire, England. It is located to the east of the city centre, between the A59 New Hall Lane and the B6243 Longridge Road. The M6 motorway also runs through the area. The ward had a population of 7,351 recorded in the 2001 census increasing to 8,548 at the 2011 Census.

== Community ==
Ribbleton has a library, a number of shops, a pub, post offices and schools.

== Demographics ==
In 2001 at the time of the census, 77.2% of Ribbleton residents classed themselves as Christian.

== Industry ==
Most of the area west of the M6 is residential. The area to the east contains a large industrial estate and agricultural land and no residential. Preston Cemetery is entirely contained in the Ribbleton ward, as is Preston Crematorium. Part of the suburb is in Brookfield ward, including the head office of the Booths supermarket chain and the former railway station, which was on the Preston and Longridge Railway.

== Education ==
The former City of Preston High School is centrally located in the area. Ribbleton Hall High closed in December 2009 and Ashton Community Science College opened it up as a second campus in January 2010. The Ribbleton Campus did not admit any year 7 pupils in September 2010. In July 2013 Ashton Community Science College withdrew from the site and returned it to Lancashire County Council. St Mary's, Leyland temporarily moved onto the site following a catastrophic fire in Leyland. They returned to Leyland in December 2013. In January 2014 Lancashire County Council passed control of the site to contractors to prepare for Sir Tom Finney High School to occupy the site in January 2015. The primary schools in the ward are Grange Community Primary, Moor Nook Community Primary, Blessed Sacrament Catholic Primary School and Brockholes Wood Community Primary School. This school is located in the Farringdon Park area of Preston at the top of Brockholes Brow. it was formerly called Faringdon Park Primary School.

== Transport ==
Access to the City Centre is via the A59 or B6243 which are often congested. There is access to the M6 nearby at junctions 31 (Samlesbury) and 31A (Bluebell Way), although there is no access to or from the M6 north via junction 31A. Although the railway through Ribbleton no longer exists, there are frequent bus services provided by Preston Bus and Stagecoach in Lancashire, including the route between Preston and Longridge.

== History ==
Ribbleton was formerly a township in the parish of Preston, in 1866 Ribbleton became a separate civil parish, in 1894 it became part of Preston Rural District, on 1 April 1934 the parish was abolished and merged with Preston and Fulwood and became part of the County Borough of Preston. In 1931 the parish had a population of 128. It is now in the unparished area of Preston.

The former Ribbleton mental hospital on Sandycroft was closed in 2015 and demolished in 2018.

== See also ==
- Districts of Preston
