= Longridge =

Town in Lancashire, England

Coordinates: 53.831°N 2.597°W

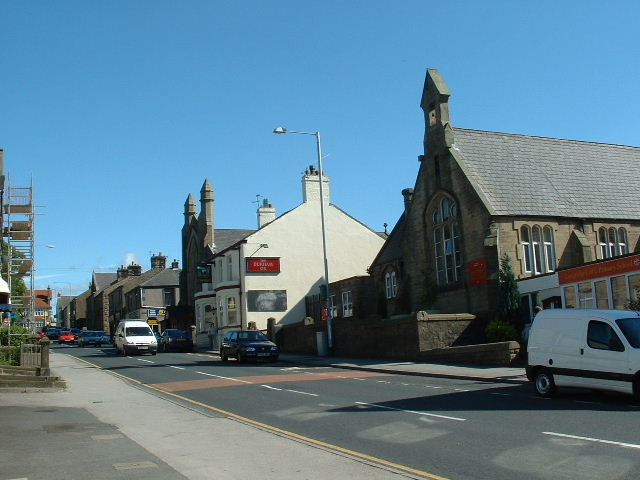
- Longridge town centre

- Shown within Ribble Valley Location within Lancashire
- Population: 7,724 (2011 Census)
- OS grid reference: SD606374
- Civil parish: Longridge
- District: Ribble Valley
- Shire county: Lancashire
- Region: North West
- Country: England
- Sovereign state: United Kingdom
- Post town: PRESTON
- Postcode district: PR3
- Dialling code: 01772
- Police: Lancashire
- Fire: Lancashire
- Ambulance: North West
- UK Parliament: Ribble Valley

Longridge is a market town and civil parish in the borough of Ribble Valley in Lancashire, England. It is situated 8 miles (13 km) north-east of the city of Preston, at the western end of Longridge Fell, a long ridge above the River Ribble. The nearest villages are Grimsargh, 2 miles (3 km) to the southeast, and Ribchester 4 miles (6 km) to the southeast. The parish of Longridge had a population of 7,546 recorded in the 2001 census, increasing to 7,724 at the 2011 Census.

== History ==
Longridge initially developed outwards from an area around St. Lawrence's Church, at the boundary of the townships of Dilworth and Alston and to the south of the modern-day town centre. Though there was a thoroughfare called 'Market Place', there was no development around that area. Most of the development of the town occurred after 1800. After this time, development occurred at a much faster pace, with expansion northwards including a mill to the north of Kestor Lane.

The demand for stone from Longridge's quarries led to the opening of the Preston and Longridge Railway in 1840 to carry the stone away, for use in such places as Liverpool Docks. The arrival of the railway led to the opening of several cotton mills and the town grew considerably larger from the mid-19th century. The mills and quarries have now all closed, although stone quarried in the town was used to construct the M55 motorway in the 1970s. One of the quarries was used as Longridge motor-racing circuit between 1973 and 1978. Longridge railway station closed to passengers in 1930, and the railway was dismantled in 1967. The station buildings were then used as offices for the parish council until 2010 when the Longridge Town Council began a project to renovate and reopen the buildings to the public with help from the Lottery Heritage Fund. Longridge railway station is now managed by Longridge Social Enterprise Company and is home to a heritage centre, the Old Station Cafe and has various business facilities available.

== Governance ==
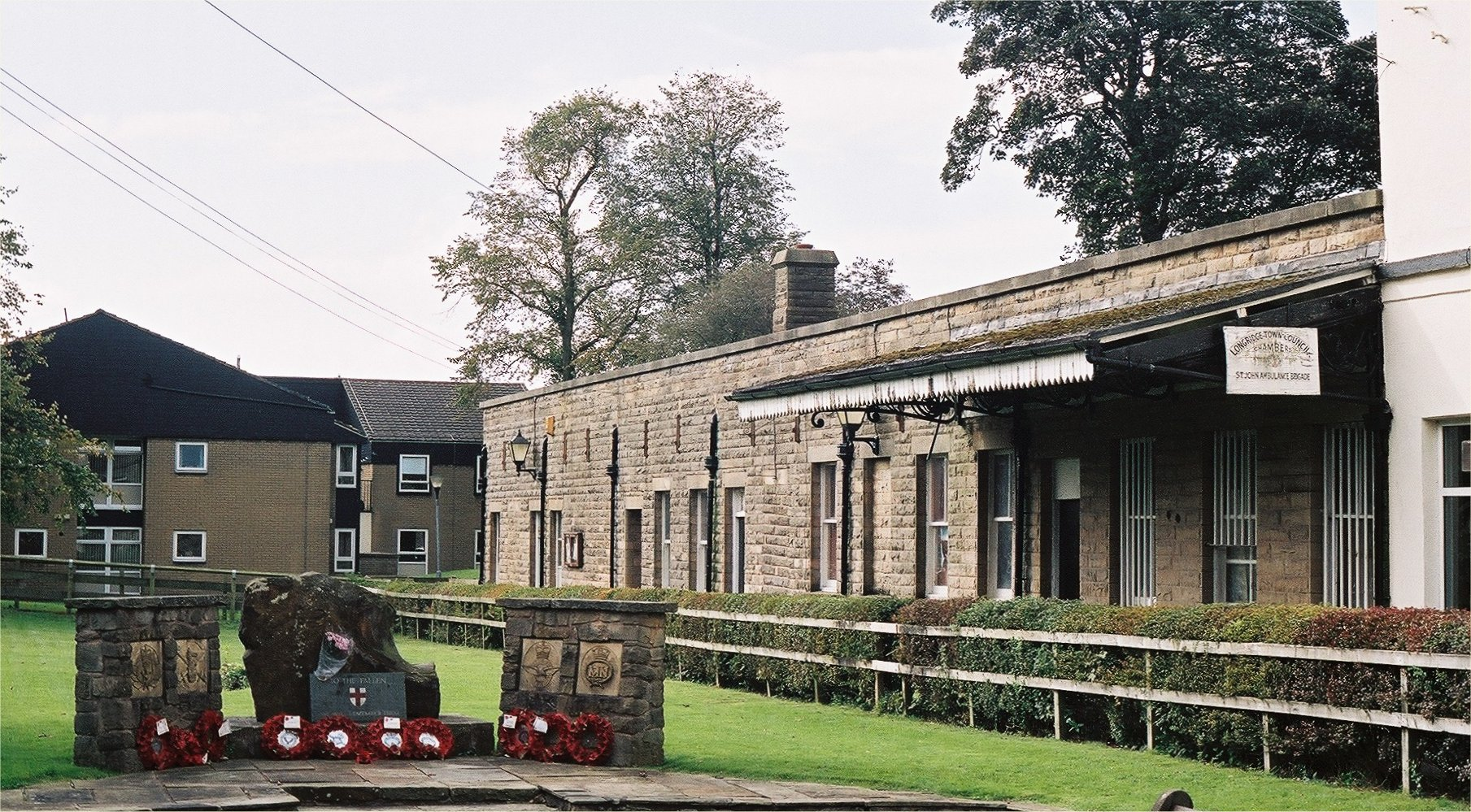
Former Longridge railway station, now town council offices.

There are three tiers of local government covering Longridge, at parish (town), district and county level: Longridge Town Council, Ribble Valley Borough Council (based in Clitheroe) and Lancashire County Council (based in Preston). The town council has its headquarters in the former Longridge railway station buildings on Berry Lane.

Longridge was historically part of the ancient parish of Ribchester, which contained a number of townships. Longridge straddled the two townships of Alston and Dilworth. An ecclesiastical parish of Longridge was created in 1861 covering the whole of the two townships, with the existing chapel of ease of St Lawrence becoming the parish church. The same area was made a local government district called Longridge in 1883, governed by a local board. Such local government districts were reconstituted as urban districts in 1894.

Longridge Urban District Council bought a large Victorian house called The Limes on Berry Lane in 1947 to serve as its headquarters. The urban district was abolished in 1974, becoming part of the new Ribble Valley district. A successor parish was created covering the former urban district, with its parish council taking the name Longridge Town Council.

== Community ==
The town is home to eleven pubs, several restaurants, a public library, and a number of primary and high schools. It is also home to an Air Training Corps squadron and an Army Cadet Force detachment. Longridge parish is also the location of Alston Hall, a residential adult education college operated by Lancashire Adult Learning. The local football club, Longridge Town F.C., has two senior teams and plays in the NWCFL, at Step 5 of the FA Football Pyramid. Its ground and clubhouse are situated off Inglewhite Road, behind the Alston Arms. As of 2011, Longridge had its own monthly farmers' market but has now stopped.

The Anglican church of St. Lawrence is located on Lower Lane and the Anglican church of St. Paul is located on Church Street.

== Sport ==
Longridge Golf Club is located on Forty Acre Lane on Longridge Fell. Additionally, Longridge Town F.C. is located along Inglewhite Road, as you exit the north of Longridge.

The second stage of the Tour of Britain Women's cycle race passed through Longridge in 2026.

== Transport ==
The bus routes in Longridge are run by Stagecoach Cumbria and North Lancashire and Vision Bus. Stagecoach run services to Preston and Vision Bus run services to Preston and Blackburn.

== Media ==
Local news and television programmes are provided by BBC North West and ITV Granada. Television signals are received from the Winter Hill TV transmitter.

Local radio stations are BBC Radio Lancashire, Heart North West, Smooth North West, Capital Manchester and Lancashire, Greatest Hits Radio Lancashire and Central Radio North West, a community-based station.

The Lancashire Telegraph is the local newspaper that covers the town.

== Notable people ==
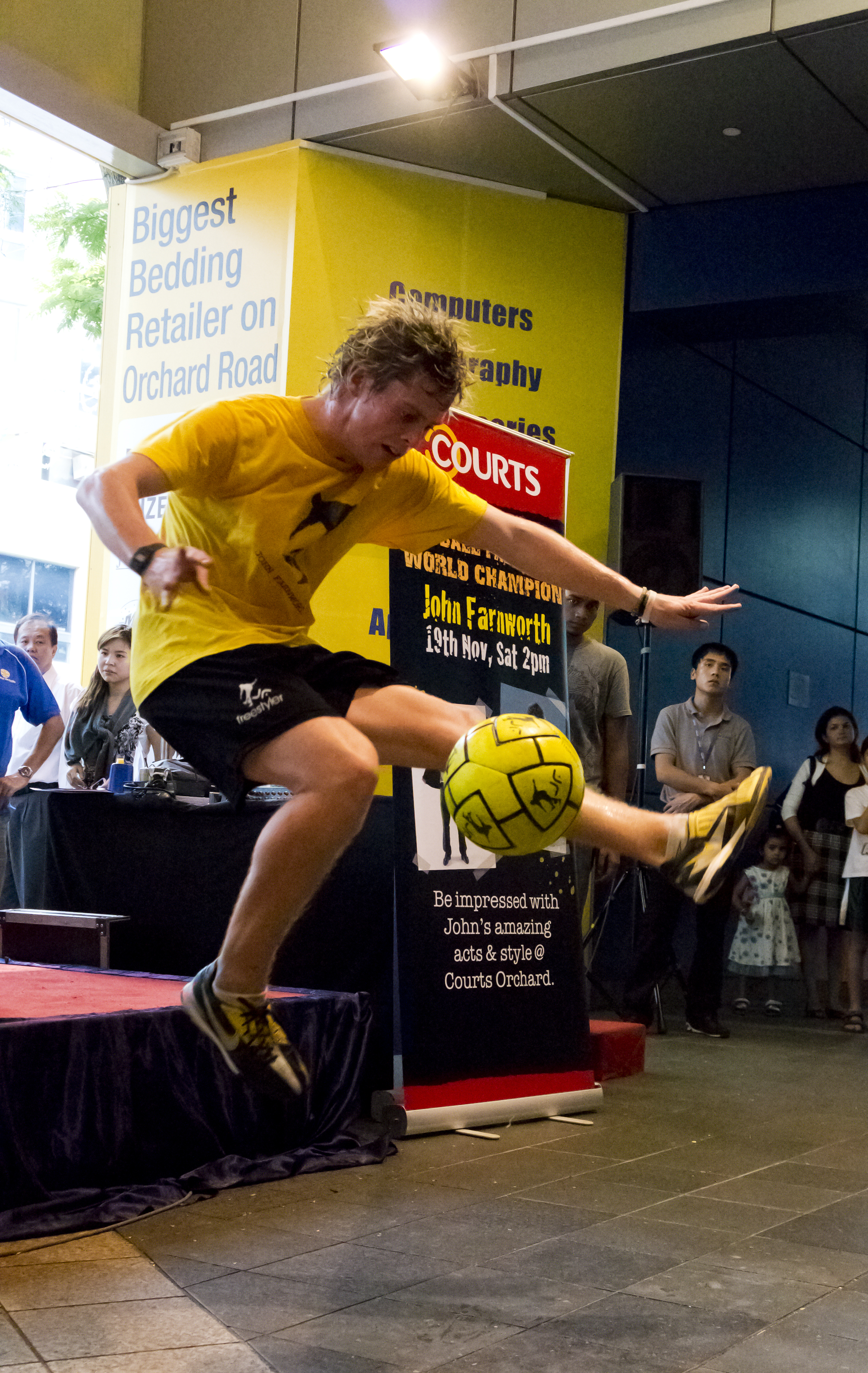
John Farnworth, 2011

- Ernest Tomlinson (1924–2015), composer, of light music, lived locally. His music library was in his barn.
- Irene Reid (born 1940/1941), the UK's longest-serving lollipop lady.
- Christina Chong (born 1983), actress and singer, lived locally and trained at the Sutcliffe School of Dance.
- John Farnworth (born 1986), entertainer, football freestyler and actor.

=== Sport ===
- Alan Kelly (born 1968), footballer.
- Andrew Miller (born 1987), cricketer.

== Arms ==
Coat of arms of Longridge

Notes
Originally granted to Longridge Urban District Council on 12 April 1954.
Crest
Upon a Rock proper a Bull passant Argent resting the dexter forehoof upon a Shuttle erect Or.
Torse
A wreath Or and Purpure.
Escutcheon
Per chevron Or and Vert on a chevron Sable between in chief two roses Gules barbed and seeded Proper and in base an eagle's leg erased of the first three bars Argent.
Motto
Sow For Posterity

== See also ==
- Listed buildings in Longridge
