= Longridge railway station (England) =

Former railway station in England

Longridge
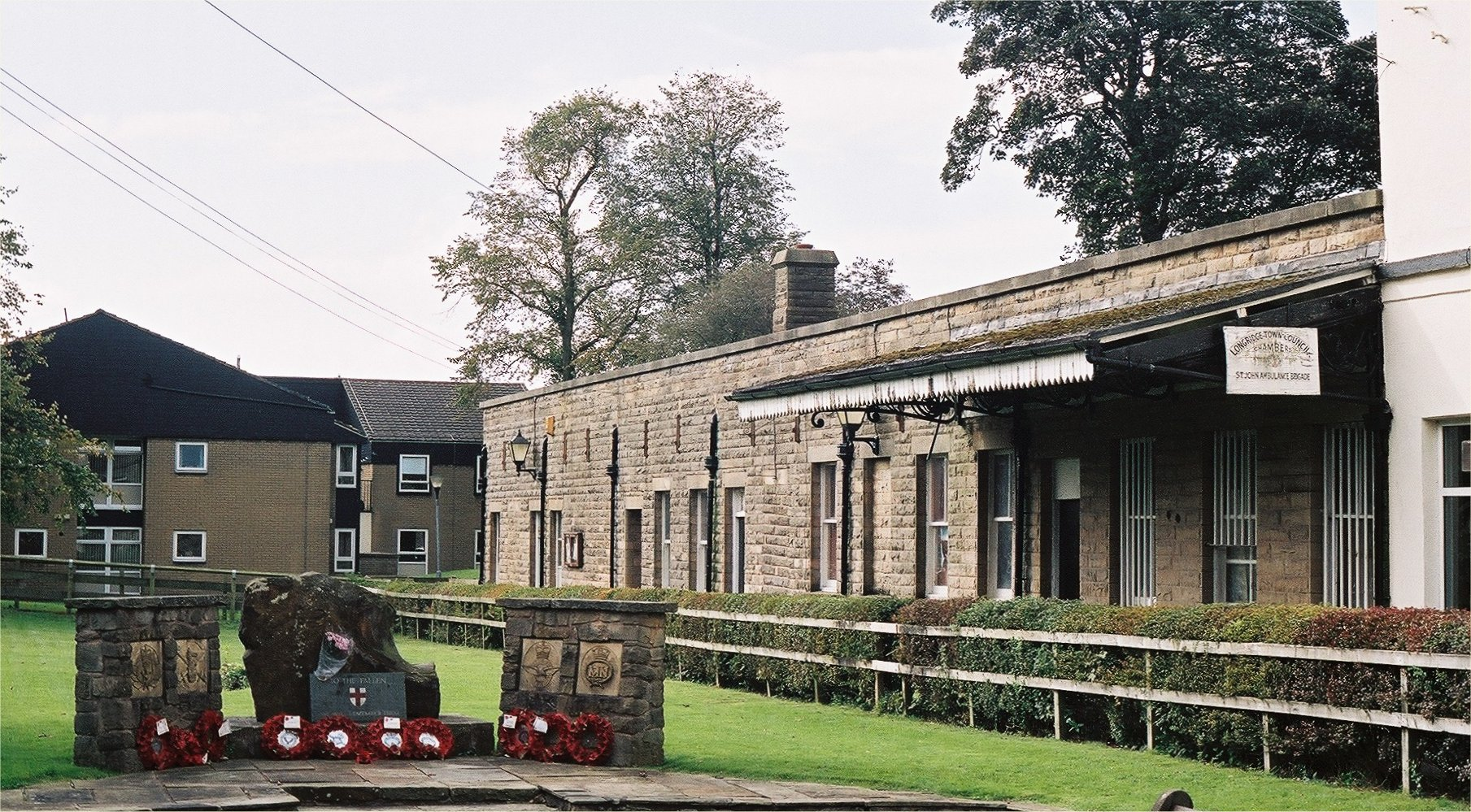
- Remains of the station buildings in 2007, viewed from the east

General information
- Location: Longridge, Ribble Valley; England
- Coordinates: 53.8315°N 2.6039°W
- Grid reference: SD603374
- Platforms: 1

Other information
- Status: Disused

History
- Original company: Preston and Longridge Railway
- Pre-grouping: Fleetwood, Preston and West Riding Junction Railway
- Post-grouping: London Midland and Scottish Railway

Key dates
- 1 May 1840: Station opened
- 2 June 1930: Closed to passengers
- November 1967: Closed to goods
Location
- Location within the Borough of Ribble Valley Location within Lancashire

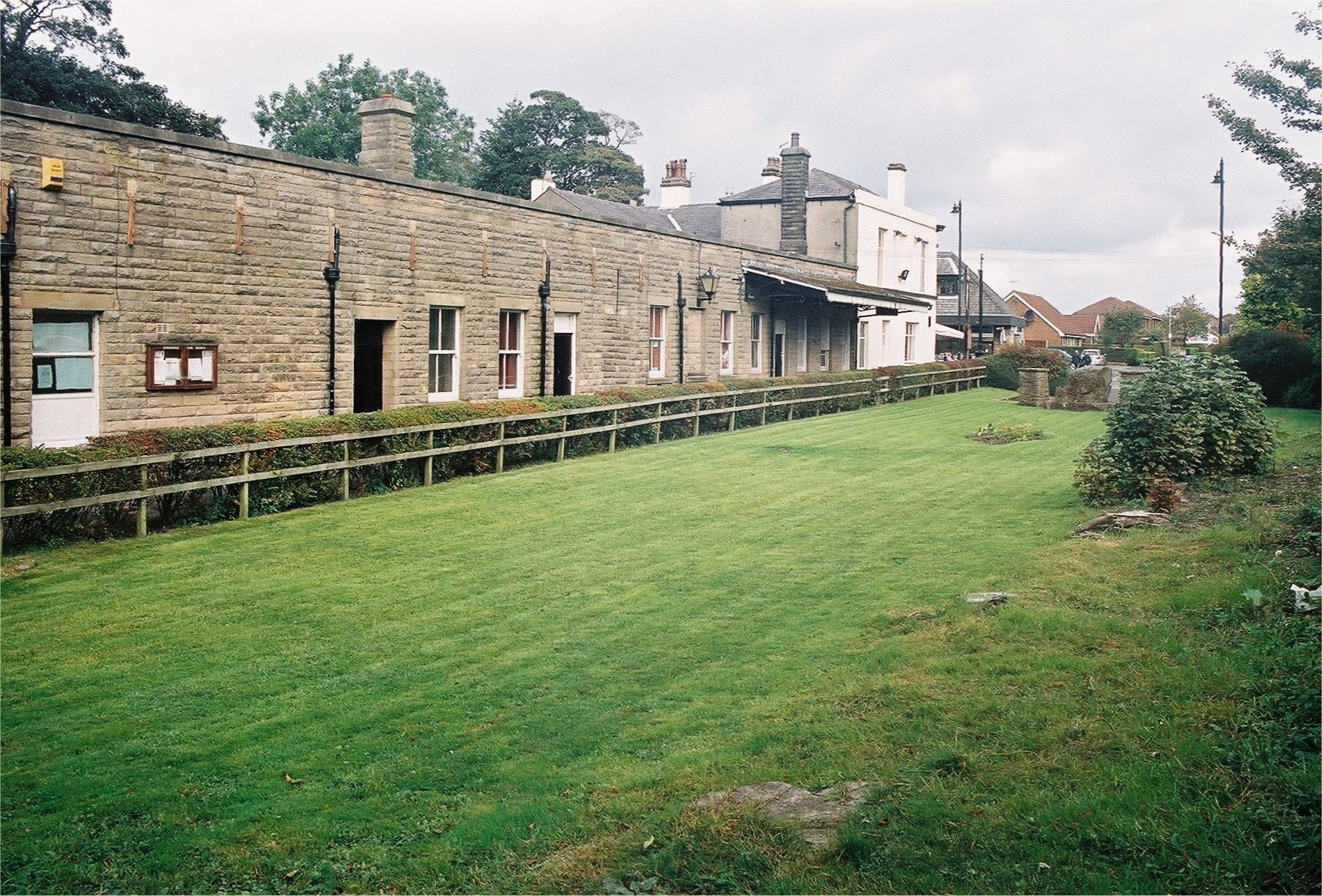
Viewed from the south, in 2007

Longridge railway station was a passenger terminus of the Preston and Longridge Railway. It served the town of Longridge in Lancashire, England.

The line first opened in 1840 to carry stone from the recently opened Tootle Heights quarry on the northeastern side of the village of Longridge, as it then was. Wagons carrying quarried stone ran downhill to Preston and were hauled in the other direction by horses. There were rudimentary passenger facilities at a level crossing in Burey Lane (later called Berry Lane) which at the time was a rural lane with only a couple of houses; the village of Longridge was at the southeast end of the lane. A hotel was built next to the station, and was known as the Longridge Railway Tavern and the Station Hotel before being renamed in 1853 the Towneley Arms, as it is still known today.

After the railway converted to steam power in 1848, Longridge expanded rapidly. Four cotton mills were built alongside the railway and Berry Lane became the town centre.

By 1867, the railway was owned jointly by the Lancashire and Yorkshire Railway and the London and North Western Railway, and three years later the railway bought the Towneley Arms. A station building was built on the side of the hotel in 1872.

On the opposite side of Berry Lane were many goods sidings, for the local mills, gasworks and a coal merchant. The line continued to the Tootle Heights quarries.

The line and the station closed to passengers on 31 May 1930. Goods traffic continued until November 1967; within the next year the tracks were lifted.

Today the former station building and canopy still exist and are used as the headquarters of Longridge Town Council. Where the tracks once ran through the station is a war memorial, erected in 1981. Part of the goods yard opposite has become a supermarket car park.

In late 2008, a Heritage Lottery Fund grant of £221,600 was awarded to restore the former station building for use as a heritage centre and community area. The restoration was completed in 2010.

== Notes ==
Preceding station	Disused railways	Following station
Grimsargh towards Preston	Preston and Longridge Railway	Terminus
