= Preston City Council elections =

Class of election in the United Kingdom

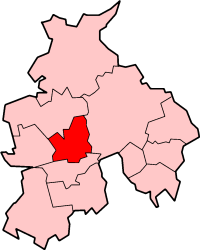
Preston shown within the non-metropolitan county of Lancashire (Unitary authorities excluded)

Preston City Council elections are generally held three years out of every four, with a third of the council elected each time. Preston City Council is the local authority for the non-metropolitan district of Preston in Lancashire, England. Since the last boundary changes in 2019, 48 councillors have been elected from 16 wards.

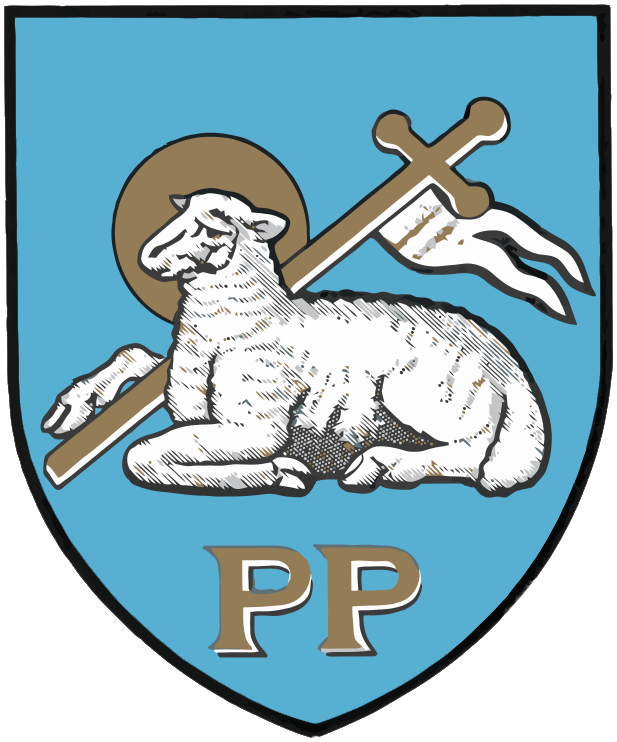
Coat of Arms of the City Council

== Council elections ==
Year	Labour	Conservative	Liberal	Liberal Democrats	Reform UK	Green	Respect	Independent
1973	38	19	0	N/A	N/A	N/A	N/A	0
1974	38	19	0	N/A	N/A	N/A	N/A	0
1975	38	19	0	N/A	N/A	N/A	N/A	0
1976	13	43	1	N/A	N/A	0	N/A	0
1978	18	37	2	N/A	N/A	0	N/A	0
1979	26	30	1	N/A	N/A	0	N/A	0
1980	31	25	1	N/A	N/A	0	N/A	0
1982	30	24	3	N/A	N/A	0	N/A	0
1983	30	24	3	N/A	N/A	0	N/A	0
1984	31	21	5	N/A	N/A	0	N/A	0
1985	31	21	5	N/A	N/A	0	N/A	0
1986	34	18	5	N/A	N/A	0	N/A	0
1987	35	16	6	N/A	N/A	0	N/A	0
1988	36	16	N/A (Note: The Liberal Party was dissolved 2 March 1988.)	5	N/A	0	N/A	0
1990	35	16	N/A	6	N/A	0	N/A	0
1991	34	17	N/A	6	N/A	0	N/A	0
1992	32	20	N/A	5	N/A	0	N/A	0
1994	31	19	N/A	7	N/A	0	N/A	0
1995	31	18	N/A	8	N/A	0	N/A	0
1996	32	13	N/A	12	N/A	0	N/A	0
1997	29	13	N/A	13	N/A	0	N/A	2 (Note: Independent 1, Labour Independent 1)
1998	30	13	N/A	13	N/A	0	N/A	1 (Note: Independent 1)
1999 (Note: During September 1999 two councillors formed "The People's Party")	28	13	N/A	14	N/A	0	N/A	2 (Note: Labour Independent 2)
2000	24	17	N/A	12	N/A	0	N/A	4 (Note: Labour Independent 3, People's Party 1)
2002	25	19	N/A	11	N/A	0	N/A	2
2003	25	18	N/A	10	N/A	0	N/A	4 (Note: Independent 2 (one elected as Socialist Alliance Against the War), Labour Independent 2)
2004	24	18	N/A	10	N/A	0	1	4
2006	24	17	N/A	12	N/A	0	2	2
2007	24	20	N/A	10	N/A	0	1	2
2008 (Note: During November 2008 one councillor changed his designation from the Respect Party to Independent Socialist)	24	21	N/A	9	N/A	0	1	2 (Note: Deepdale Independent 2)
2010	24	22	N/A	8	N/A	0	0	3 (Note: Deepdale Independent 2, Independent Socialist 1)
2011	29	21	N/A	6	N/A	0	0	1 (Note: Deepdale Independent 1)
2012	31	19	N/A	5	N/A	0	0	2 (Note: Independent 1, Deepdale Independent 1)
2014	32	19	N/A	5	N/A	0	0	1
2015	32	19	N/A	5	N/A	0	0	1
2016	33	19	N/A	5	N/A	0	0	0
2018 (Note: During August 2018 two councillors formed an Independent Conservatives group.)	35	17	N/A	5	N/A	0	N/A	0
2019 (Note: During May 2020 one councillor resigned their seat, which remained vacant until restrictions in place due to the COVID-19 pandemic are lifted.)	30	9	N/A	9	N/A	0	N/A	0
2021	30	11	N/A	7	N/A	0	N/A	0
2022	30	11	N/A	7	N/A	0	N/A	0
2023	31	10	N/A	7	N/A	0	N/A	0
2024	30	6	N/A	12	N/A	0	N/A	0
2026	21	3	N/A	14	5	2	N/A	3

== District result maps ==
2002 results map

2003 results map

2004 results map

2006 results map

2007 results map

2008 results map

2010 results map

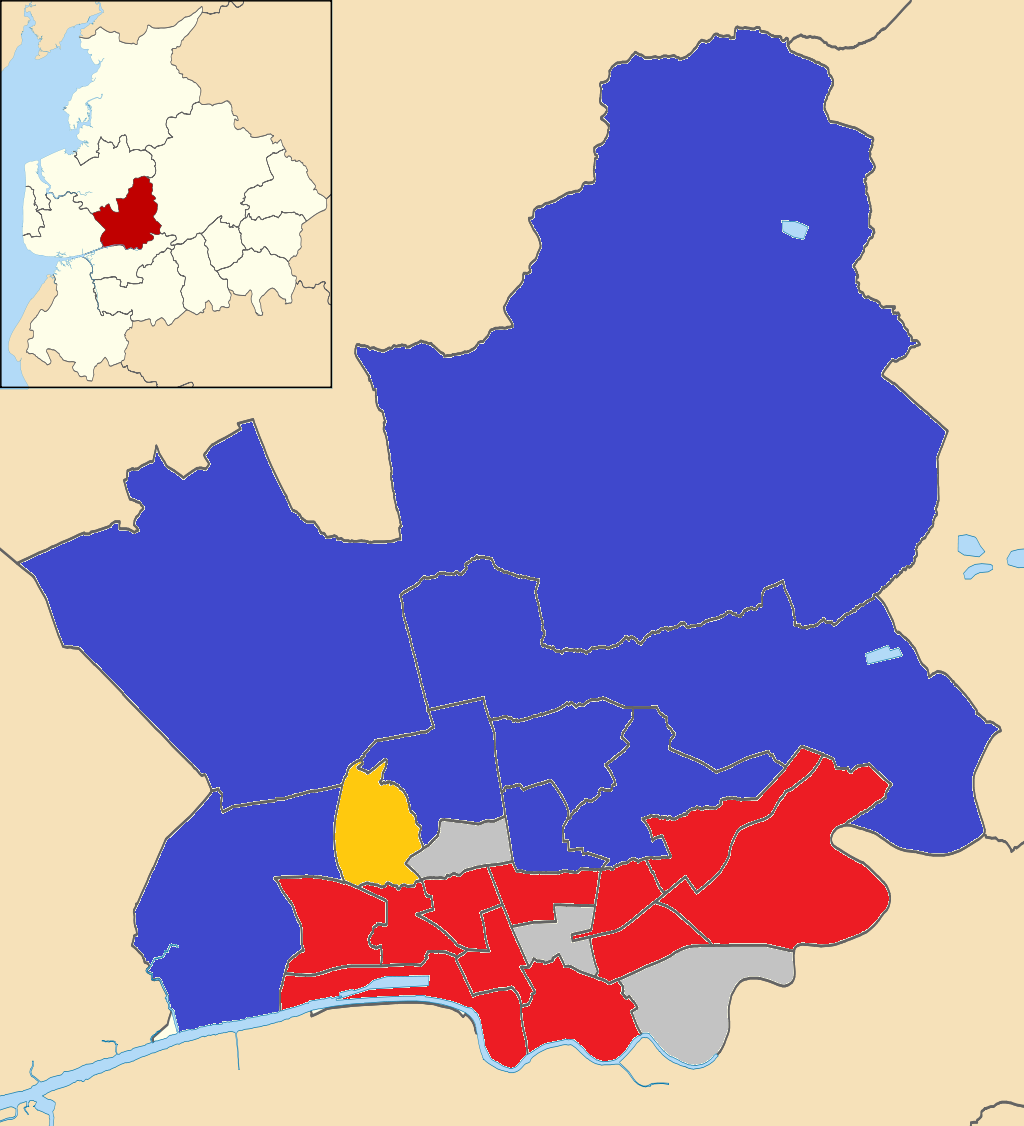
2011 results map

2012 results map

2014 results map

2015 results map

2016 results map

2018 results map

2019 results map

2021 results map

2022 results map

2023 results map

2024 results map

2026 results map

== Changes between elections ==
=== 1990 boundaries ===
St Matthews By-Election 1 October 1998
Party	Candidate	Votes	%	±%
Labour	Veronica Afrin	617	41.5	−28.6
Liberal Democrats	Anna Riedel	383	25.8	+13.2
Independent	Paul Malliband	278	18.7	N/A
Conservative	Elaine Pugh	179	12.0	−5.2
Independent	Gerald Kerrone	30	2.0	N/A
Majority		234	15.7	
Turnout		1,487	30.1	
Labour hold		Swing		

Central By-Election 20 January 2000
Party	Candidate	Votes	%	±%
Labour	John Swindells	361	64.6	−3.6
Conservative	David Hammond	134	24.0	+8.6
Independent	Bernadette Jones	64	1.5	N/A
Majority		227	40.6	
Turnout		559	8.6	
Labour hold		Swing		

Rural East By-Election 20 January 2000
Party	Candidate	Votes	%	±%
Conservative	Harry Landless	903	82.1	+2.4
Liberal Democrats	John Bruton	153	13.9	+2.9
Labour	Terry Mattinson	44	4.0	−5.3
Majority		750	68.2	
Turnout		1,100	21.0	
Conservative hold		Swing		

Larches By-Election 29 March 2001
Party	Candidate	Votes	%	±%
Labour	Peter Ward	501	48.8	+24.0
Liberal Democrats	Danny Gallagher	349	34.0	−23.8
Conservative	R Turner	110	10.7	−0.4
Independent	I Heywood	67	6.5	+0.2
Majority		152	14.8	
Turnout		1,027	23.7	
Labour gain from Liberal Democrats		Swing	+23.9	

=== 2007 boundaries ===
Tulketh by-election 14 February 2008
Party	Candidate	Votes	%	±%
Labour	Peter Rankin	423	34.3	−6.8
Liberal Democrats	Rick Seymour	400	32.4	+21.5
Conservative	Paul Balshaw	292	23.6	−6.7
No description	Barry Hill	84	6.8	N/A
Green	Kizzi Murtagh	36	2.9	N/A
Majority		23	1.9	
Turnout		1,235		
Labour hold		Swing	-14.2	

Fishwick by-election 1 October 2009
Party	Candidate	Votes	%	±%
Labour	Jennifer Mein	656	55.7	+13.2
Conservative	Sharon Riley	283	24.0	+3.9
Liberal Democrats	Luke Bosman	239	20.3	+1.3
Majority		373	31.7	
Turnout		1,178	30.9	
Labour hold		Swing	+8.6	

Riversway by-election 15 July 2010
Party	Candidate	Votes	%	±%
Labour Co-op	Linda Crompton	890	66.72	
Liberal Democrats	Stephen Wilkinson	388	29.09	
Green	Adam Vardey	56	4.20	
Majority		502	37.63	
Turnout		1,334		
Labour gain from Liberal Democrats		Swing	+8.6	

Cadley by-election 16 September 2010
Party	Candidate	Votes	%	±%
Liberal Democrats	John Potter	721	43.1	−14.0
Labour	John Young	476	28.5	+20.8
Conservative	David Walker	465	28.4	−6.9
Majority		245	14.7	−141
Turnout		1,672		
Liberal Democrats hold		Swing	-3.6	

Ashton by-election, 4 May 2017 (term ends 2020)
Party	Candidate	Votes	%	±%
Labour	Liz Atkins	648	47.89	+3.29
Conservative	Michael Balshaw	477	35.25	+2.28
Liberal Democrats	Jeremy Dable	166	12.27	+4.15
UKIP	Simon Platt	62	4.58	−3.37
Majority		171	12.64	+1.01
Turnout		1,353		
Labour hold		Swing	+0.51	

Preston Rural East by-election, 4 May 2017 (term ends 2018)
Party	Candidate	Votes	%	±%
Conservative	Ron Woollam	987	69.46	−0.84
Labour	Joshua Mascord	216	15.20	−14.50
Liberal Democrats	David Callaghan	160	11.26	N/A
UKIP	Kieran Aspden	58	4.08	N/A
Majority		771	54.26	
Turnout		1,421		
Conservative hold		Swing	+6.83	

Conservative councillor Damien Moore (Greyfriars) resigned from the council in March 2018 (he was elected Member of Parliament for Southport in 2017). The seat (term ending 2019 due to boundary changes trigger a full election) was filled in a double election for Greyfriars on 3 May.

=== 2019 boundaries ===
Lea and Larches by-election, 4 July 2024 (term ends 2026)
Party	Candidate	Votes	%	±%
Liberal Democrats	Sean Little	1,210	38.8	+2.6
Labour	Mark Routledge	1,077	34.5	−0.9
Independent	Ann Cowell	467	15.0	−4.1
Conservative	Daniel Duckworth	364	11.7	+2.5
Majority		133	4.3	
Turnout		3,118		
Liberal Democrats gain from Labour		Swing		

Ashton by-election, 16 October 2025 (term ends 2026)
Party	Candidate	Votes	%	±%
Liberal Democrats	Ronan Hodgson	659	35.5	+14.0
Reform	Lee Slater	548	29.5	+29.5
Labour	Mark Routledge	429	23.1	−35.7
Independent	Ann Cowell	101	5.4	+5.4
Conservative	Kevin Brockbank	61	3.3	−16.4
Independent	Aran Bailey	60	3.2	+3.2
Majority		111	6.0	
Turnout		1,858		
Liberal Democrats gain from Labour		Swing		
