= 2003 Preston City Council election =

2003 UK local government election

Map of the results of the 2003 Preston council election. Labour in red, Conservatives in blue, Liberal Democrats in yellow, independent in light grey and Socialist Alliance in light red. Wards in dark grey were not contested in 2003.

This article details the results of Elections to Preston City Council held in May 2003

Preston Council is elected "in thirds", which means in 2002 the entire council was up for election and in subsequent years one councillor from the three-member wards and one councillor from selected two-member wards defend their seat. In these result tables, the share of the vote is blank as the 2002 elections cannot be fairly compared. Any gain or loss can be recorded as each year the councillors are defending their ward results.

For more results see Preston local elections

== Ward results ==
=== Ashton ===
Preston City Council Elections: Ashton Ward 2003
Party	Candidate	Votes	%	±%
Conservative	William Tyson	605	54.3	
Labour	Mark Routledge	509	45.6	
Majority		96		
Turnout		1,130	33	

=== Brookfield ===
Preston City Council Elections: Brookfield ward 2003
Party	Candidate	Votes	%	±%
Labour	Nerys Eaves	637	53.7	
Conservative	David Johnston	549	46.3	
Majority		88		
Turnout		1,196	22	

=== College ===
Preston City Council Elections: College ward 2003
Party	Candidate	Votes	%	±%
Conservative	Jill Truby	676	55.2	
Liberal Democrats	Michael Turner	377	30.8	
Labour	Paul Jackson	171	14.0	
Majority		299		
Turnout		1,186	38	

=== Deepdale ===
Preston City Council Elections: Deepdale ward 2003
Party	Candidate	Votes	%	±%
No description	Joyce Cartright	870	64.9	
Labour	Javed Iqbal	306	22.8	
Conservative	Peter McElhone	165	12.3	
Majority		564		
Turnout		1,356	36	

=== Garrison ===
Preston City Council Elections: Garrison ward 2003
Party	Candidate	Votes	%	±%
Conservative	Marie Francoise Milne	869	62.9	
Labour	Marcus Quick	256	18.5	
Liberal Democrats	Gregory Vickers	256	18.5	
Majority		613		
Turnout		1,386	27	

=== Greyfriars ===
Preston City Council Elections: Greyfriars ward 2003
Party	Candidate	Votes	%	±%
Conservative	Peter Horton	1,592	62.9	
Liberal Democrats	John Porter	636	26.1	
Labour	Alan Woods	213	8.7	
Majority		956		
Turnout		2,447	46	

=== Ingol ===
Preston City Council Elections: Ingol ward 2003
Party	Candidate	Votes	%	±%
Liberal Democrats	Peter Pringle	594		
Liberal Democrats	William Shannon	501		
Conservative	Kathryn Calder	432		
Conservative	Susan Hudson	430		
Labour	Alan Foster	336		
Labour	Ian Walton	292		
Majority		162 & 71		
Turnout		2,590 [votes]	46	

=== Larches ===
Preston City Council Elections: Larches ward 2003
Party	Candidate	Votes	%	±%
Labour	Martyn Rawlinson	571	38.5	
Liberal Democrats	David Bastable	526	35.4	
Conservative	Jane Balshaw	388	26.1	
Majority		45		
Turnout		1,149	27	

=== Lea ===
Preston City Council Elections: Lea ward 2003
Party	Candidate	Votes	%	±%
Liberal Democrats	Pauline Brown	652	48.9	
Conservative	Pilar Maria Sanz-Moreno	493	37.0	
Labour	Marie Johnson	189	14.2	
Majority		159		
Turnout		1,342	30	

=== Moor Park ===
Preston City Council Elections: Moor Park ward 2003
Party	Candidate	Votes	%	±%
Labour	Francesco de Molfetta	650	71.43	
Conservative	Yvonne Driver	260	28.57	
Majority		390		
Turnout		910	24	

=== Preston Rural East ===
Preston City Council Elections: Preston Rural East ward 2003
Party	Candidate	Votes	%	±%
Conservative	Neil Cartright	842	78.8	
Labour	John Houghton	226	21.2	
Majority		616		
Turnout		1,078	35	

=== Ribbleton ===
Preston City Council Elections: Ribbleton ward 2003
Party	Candidate	Votes	%	±%
Labour	Brian Rollo	674	65.2	
Conservative	Paul Balshaw	359	34.8	
Majority		315		
Turnout		1,046	19	

=== Riversway ===
Preston City Council Elections: Riversway ward 2003
Party	Candidate	Votes	%	±%
Labour	Bhikhu Patel	577	47.6	
Liberal Democrats	Mavis Cooper	331	27.3	
Conservative	Ann-Marie Hunter	305	25.1	
Majority		246		
Turnout		1,225	26	

=== Sharoe Green ===
Preston City Council Elections: Sharoe Green ward 2003
Party	Candidate	Votes	%	±%
Conservative	Eric Fazackerley	960	59.7	
Liberal Democrats	Peter Newsham	346	21.5	
Labour	Terrence Mattinson	301	18.7	
Majority		614		
Turnout		1,611	31	

=== St George's ===
Preston City Council Elections: St George's ward 2003
Party	Candidate	Votes	%	±%
Labour	James Thomas Hull	411	62.7	
Conservative	Gulam Hussain Mulla	245	37.3	
Majority		166	25.3	
Turnout		656	20.7	

=== St Matthew's ===
Preston City Council Elections: St Matthew's ward 2003
Party	Candidate	Votes	%	±%
Labour	Ian Hall	788	72.5	
Conservative	Thomas George Whalley	299	27.5	
Majority		489		
Turnout		1,112	23	

=== Town Centre ===
Preston City Council Elections: Town Centre Ward 2003
Party	Candidate	Votes	%	±%
Socialist Alliance	Michael Lavalette	546	37.81	
Labour	Musa Ahmed Jiwa	440	30.47	
Conservative	Julian Sedgewick	228	15.79	
Liberal Democrats	Liam Pennington	220	15.24	
Majority		106	1.34	
Turnout		1,444	28.0	
Socialist Alliance gain from Labour		Swing		

=== Tulketh ===
Preston City Council Elections: Tulketh ward 2003
Party	Candidate	Votes	%	±%
Labour	Steven Brooks	791	50.9	
Conservative	Margaret McManus	764	49.1	
Majority		27		
Turnout		1,571	30	
Labour gain from Conservative		Swing		

=== University ===
Preston City Council Elections: University ward 2003
Party	Candidate	Votes	%	±%
Labour	John Swindells	278	59.0	
Conservative	Andrew Dowellian	193	41.0	
Majority		85		
Turnout		476	22.0	

== See also ==
- Preston local elections
- City of Preston, Lancashire
- Fulwood, Lancashire
- Lea, Lancashire
- Preston (UK Parliament constituency)
