= 2018 Preston City Council election =

2018 UK local government election

Results of the 2018 Preston City Council election

Council elections for the City of Preston, Lancashire were held on 3 May 2018 as part of the 2018 United Kingdom local elections. Due to the "in thirds" system employed in Preston local elections, the previous elections to Preston council occurred in the 2014 Preston City Council election, consequently this means gains, losses, and vote share comparisons this year are with those fought in 2014.

All locally registered electors (British, Irish, Commonwealth and European Union citizens) who are aged 18 or over on polling day are entitled to vote in the local elections.

== Election result ==
Preston local election result 2018
Party	Seats	Gains	Losses	Net gain/loss	Seats %	Votes %	Votes	+/−
Labour	14	+2		+2	73.68	50.50	13,121	-710
Conservative	3		-2	-2	15.79	33.18	8,620	+384
Liberal Democrats	2			N/C	10.53	14.31	3,718	+936
UKIP					0	1.91	495	
TUSC				0	0	0.10	26	N/A

== Ward results ==
=== Brookfield ===
Preston Council election, 2018: Brookfield
Party	Candidate	Votes	%	±%
Labour	John Browne	804	65.4	+10.5
Conservative	Bowen Perryman	274	22.3	+10.2
UKIP	Derek Killeen	152	12.4	−20.6
Majority		530	43.1	+21.2
Turnout				
Labour hold		Swing		

=== Cadley ===
Preston Council elections, 2018: Cadley
Party	Candidate	Votes	%	±%
Liberal Democrats	Claire Craven	966	58.5	+14.4
Conservative	Mehfuz Dasu Patel	353	21.4	−8.4
Labour	Joshua Mascord	333	20.2	−5.9
Majority		613	37.1	+19.0
Turnout				
Liberal Democrats hold		Swing		

=== College ===
Preston Council election, 2018: College
Party	Candidate	Votes	%	±%
Labour	Freddie Bailey	734	56.2	+17.7
Conservative	Paul Balshaw	500	38.3	−4.9
Liberal Democrats	Michael Turner	72	5.5	−2.2
Majority		234	17.9	+13.3
Turnout				
Labour gain from Conservative		Swing		

=== Fishwick ===
Preston Council election, 2018: Fishwick
Party	Candidate	Votes	%	±%
Labour	Whitney Hawkins	734	75.1	−5.3
Conservative	Munirah Dasu Patel	152	15.6	−4.0
Liberal Democrats	Luke Bosman	65	6.7	N/A
TUSC	Thomas Costello	26	2.7	N/A
Majority		582	59.6	−1.1
Turnout				
Labour hold		Swing		

=== Garrison ===
Preston Council election, 2018: Garrison
Party	Candidate	Votes	%	±%
Labour	Anna Hindle	811	48.4	+20.8
Conservative	Paul Whalley	744	44.4	+6.6
Liberal Democrats	Hans Voges	122	7.3	+1.1
Majority		67	4.0	−6.2
Turnout				
Labour gain from Conservative		Swing		

=== Greyfriars ===
Due to the resignation of Damien Moore there will be a double election making direct comparison with 2014 impossible.

Preston Council election, 2018: Greyfriars
Party	Candidate	Votes	%	±%
Conservative	Robert Jolliffe	1,072	46.9	
Conservative	Ian Donnell	1,054	46.1	
Liberal Democrats	Margaret Lodge	682	29.9	
Labour	Alan Woods	534	23.4	
Labour	Iain Hams	524	22.9	
Liberal Democrats	Deborah Shannon	501	21.9	
Majority				
Turnout				
Conservative hold		Swing		

=== Ingol ===
Preston Council election, 2018: Ingol
Party	Candidate	Votes	%	±%
Liberal Democrats	Neil Darby	763	51.7	+17.2
Labour	Christopher Berry	375	25.4	−0.3
Conservative	Tim Cox	265	17.9	+6.2
UKIP	Samuel Furr	74	5.0	−23.1
Majority		388	26.3	+19.9
Turnout		1,477		
Liberal Democrats hold		Swing		

=== Larches ===
Preston Council election, 2018: Larches
Party	Candidate	Votes	%	±%
Labour	Phil Crowe	769	51.0	+8.4
Conservative	Beth Helen Balshaw	463	30.7	−9.8
Liberal Democrats	Ed Craven	197	13.1	+6.7
UKIP	Mark Kingsley	78	5.2	N/A
Majority			20.31	
Turnout		1,507		
Labour hold		Swing		

=== Lea ===
Preston Council election, 2018: Lea
Party	Candidate	Votes	%	±%
Conservative	Martin McKeever	775	48.9	+11.8
Liberal Democrats	Mark Jewell	462	29.2	+6.7
Labour	Alan Dent	347	21.9	+3.8
Majority			27.0%	
Turnout		1,584		

=== Moor Park ===
Preston Council election, 2018: Moor Park
Party	Candidate	Votes	%	±%
Labour	Nweeda Khan	655	79.0	+5.7
Conservative	Simon Crowe	174	21.0	+5.7
Majority				
Turnout		829		

=== Preston Rural North ===
Preston Council election, 2018: Preston Rural North
Party	Candidate	Votes	%	±%
Conservative	Sue Whittam	1,549	72.0	+16.1
Labour	Gillian Mascord	414	19.2	+6.1
Liberal Democrats	Fiona Duke	188	8.7	+2.7
Majority				
Turnout		2,151		

=== Ribbleton ===
Preston Council election, 2018: Ribbleton
Party	Candidate	Votes	%	±%
Labour	Jonathan Saksena	784	66.8	+12.9
Conservative	Rob Jones	274	23.4	+10.9
UKIP	Anthony James	115	9.8	−22.9
Majority				
Turnout		1,173		

=== Riversway ===
Preston Council election, 2018: Riversway
Party	Candidate	Votes	%	±%
Labour	Peter Kelly	1,054	80.2	−0.7
Conservative	Connor Rumble	261	19.8	+0.7
Majority				
Turnout		1,315		

=== Sharoe Green ===
Preston Council election, 2018: Sharoe Green
Party	Candidate	Votes	%	±%
Conservative	Keith Sedgewick	922	52.8	+16.6
Labour	Simon Fullalove	652	37.3	+5.4
Liberal Democrats	Rebecca Potter	172	9.9	+4.6
Majority				
Turnout		1,746		

=== St George's ===
Preston Council election, 2018: St George's
Party	Candidate	Votes	%	±%
Labour	James Hull	752	87.0	−0.9
Conservative	Danielle Mayor	112	13.0	+0.9
Majority				
Turnout		864		

=== St Matthew's ===
Preston Council election, 2018: St Matthew's
Party	Candidate	Votes	%	±%
Labour	Jono Grisdale	957	87.6	+0.9
Conservative	Mike Balshaw	136	12.4	−0.9
Majority				
Turnout		1,093		

=== Town Centre ===
Preston Council election, 2018: Town Centre ward
Party	Candidate	Votes	%	±%
Labour	Salim Desai	1,194	82.8	N/A
Conservative	Yusuf Mitha	248	17.2	N/A
Majority				
Turnout				

=== Tulketh ===
Preston Council election, 2018: Tulketh
Party	Candidate	Votes	%	±%
Labour	Carol Henshaw	827	64.8	+9.6
Conservative	Jonty Campbell	254	19.9	+5.6
Liberal Democrats	Michael Yates	119	9.9	N/A
UKIP	Simon Platt	76	6.0	−16.8
Majority				
Turnout		1,276		

=== University ===
Preston Council election, 2018: University
Party	Candidate	Votes	%	±%
Labour	Carl Crompton	396	79.7	+1.1
Conservative	Luke Walmsley	101	20.3	−1.1
Majority				
Turnout		497		
