= 1999 Preston Borough Council election =

Elections to Preston Borough Council were held on 6 May 1999. One third of the council was up for election and the Labour party kept overall control of the council after a Liberal Democrat councillor defected to them on the night of the counting of the votes.

After the election, the composition of the council was:

Party	Seats	±
Labour	29	-1
Liberal Democrat	13	0
Conservative	13	0
Independent	2	+1

== Election result ==
Preston local election result 1999
Party	Seats	Gains	Losses	Net gain/loss	Seats %	Votes %	Votes	+/−
Labour	9			-1	45.00	37.59	12,098	
Conservative	6			0	30.00	30.70	9,878	
Liberal Democrats	4			0	20.00	27.74	8,927	
Independent	1			+1	5.00	3.97	1,277	

== Ward results ==
The 1999 and 2000 results are for the electoral wards prior to the boundary changes which took place for the 2002 "all out" elections.

=== Ashton ===
This north west suburban ward was barely changed in the subsequent boundary changes put in place for 2002. This mix of housing and shopping areas includes a couple of popular schools and commuting bases.

Preston City Council Elections: Ashton Ward
Party	Candidate	Votes	%	±%
Conservative	William Tyson	1,016	59.17	
Labour	Stacey Borrow	550	32.03	
Liberal Democrats	Alfred Wild	149	8.68	
Majority		466	27.17	

=== Avenham ===
This troubled of high-rise flats and council housing, and private houses in the Frenchwood area on the banks of the River Ribble, would be merged with some areas of Preston's then town centre in the subsequent boundary review.

Preston City Council Elections: Avenham Ward
Party	Candidate	Votes	%	±%
Labour	Musa Ahmed Jiwa	794	65.84	
Liberal Democrats	Margaret Marshall	207	17.16	
Conservative	Paul Hammond	202	16.75	
Majority		587	48.79	

=== Brookfield ===
A ward in the north east of the town with a mix of social housing and a suburban outer core.

Preston City Council Elections: Brookfield Ward
Party	Candidate	Votes	%	±%
Labour	Jonathan Harish Chandra Saksena	638	62.86	
Conservative	Keith Sedgewick	243	23.94	
Liberal Democrats	Mavis Cooper	131	12.91	
Majority		395	39.03	

=== Cadley ===
Placed on the outer fringes of Fulwood this is a box-shaped urban ward of middle-class and retired population with a sizable commuting base.

Preston City Council Elections: Cadley Ward
Party	Candidate	Votes	%	±%
Liberal Democrats	Michael Onyon	1,300	62.08	
Conservative	Paul Balshaw	658	31.42	
Labour	Michael Carruthers	132	6.30	
Majority		642	30.72	

=== Central ===
Based on the area surrounding the growing University and St Walberg's Church, this ward would be divided amongst a number of wards in the boundary review in place for the 2002 elections.

Preston City Council Elections: Central Ward
Party	Candidate	Votes	%	±%
Labour	Carl Crompton	790	68.16	
Liberal Democrats	Simon Moore	190	16.39	
Conservative	James Seddon	178	15.36	
Majority		600	51.81	

=== Deepdale ===
This ward of terraced housing and Preston North End football club was once recorded as the most deprived in the country.

Preston City Council Elections: Deepdale Ward
Party	Candidate	Votes	%	±%
Independent	Joyce Cartwright	984	52.00	
Labour	Henry Heaps	543	28.70	
Conservative	Anne Hammond	196	10.36	
Liberal Democrats	Bernadette Jones	157	8.30	
Majority		441	23.46	

=== Fishwick ===
The social housing estate of Callon and great swathes of comfortable housing makes up the Fishwick ward in the southwest of the town, up against the South Ribble border.

Preston City Council Elections: Fishwick Ward
Party	Candidate	Votes	%	±%
Labour	Ian Hall	615	62.25	
Conservative	David Hammond	214	21.66	
Liberal Democrats	Wilf Gavin	152	15.38	
Majority		401	40.88	

=== Greyfriars ===
In the north of the town, this ward named after a private house is a central element of Fulwood and spans the A6 road from Preston to Lancaster.

Preston City Council Elections: Greyfriars Ward
Party	Candidate	Votes	%	±%
Conservative	Geoff Driver	1,354	52.97	
Liberal Democrats	Raymond Askew	1,069	41.82	
Labour	Terence Mattinson	126	4.93	
Majority		285	11.18	

=== Ingol ===
In the north west of the town, the Ingol and Tanterton areas bring together a notable number of retirement homes and comfortable properties up against the Lancaster Canal and social housing.

Preston City Council Elections: Ingol Ward
Party	Candidate	Votes	%	±%
Liberal Democrats	Ann Green	899	66.84	
Labour	Julie Humphrey	239	18.60	
Conservative	Shiela Hays	202	15.02	
Majority		660	49.25	

=== Larches ===
Based on two post-war overspill estates of Larches and Savick

Preston City Council Elections: Larches Ward
Party	Candidate	Votes	%	±%
Liberal Democrats	Joe Fitzgerald	652	50.74	
Labour	John Swindells	516	40.16	
Conservative	Julie Milne	116	9.03	
Majority		136	10.59	

=== Moor Park ===
In the central area of Preston this ward is based on Plungington and the terraces near Moor Park itself. The ward cut into the southern parts of Fulwood which would be transferred in the subsequent boundary review to the new college ward.

Preston City Council Elections: Moor Park Ward
Party	Candidate	Votes	%	±%
Labour	Francesco di Molfetta	860	51.40	
Liberal Democrats	John Monk	430	25.70	
Conservative	Rowena Edmonson	373	22.30	
Majority		430	25.86	

=== Preston Rural East ===
This expanse of rural villages and farming communities includes the Broughton and Goosnargh.

Preston City Council Elections: Rural East Ward
Party	Candidate	Votes	%	±%
Conservative	George Gates	1,464	79.78	
Liberal Democrats	Edward Rowland	202	11.01	
Labour	John Williams	170	9.26	
Majority		1262	68.74	

=== Preston Rural West ===
Largely based on the Woodplumpton and Lea and Cottam areas to the west of the town towards the Fylde border.

Preston City Council Elections: Rural West Ward
Party	Candidate	Votes	%	±%
Liberal Democrats	Christine Abram	1,112	45.84	
Conservative	George Wilkins	1,060	43.69	
Labour	John Collins	250	10.30	
Majority		52	2.15	

=== Ribbleton ===
In the east of the town this ward has a high percentage of social housing.

Preston City Council Elections: Ribbleton Ward
Party	Candidate	Votes	%	±%
Labour	Glenys di Cioccio	432	53.60	
Independent (politician)	Ronald Yates	156	19.35	
Conservative	Jane Balshaw	132	16.38	
Liberal Democrats	Heather Drury	85	10.55	
Majority		276	34.29	

=== Riversway ===
A growing ward with Broadgate against the River Ribble and the redeveloped Marina complex.

Preston City Council Elections: Riversway Ward
Party	Candidate	Votes	%	±%
Labour	Marcus Johnstone	734	46.72	
Liberal Democrats	Alan Valentine	702	44.68	
Conservative	Susan Brown	132	8.40	
Majority		32	2.04	

=== Sharoe Green ===
Based on the urban environs around the Sharoe Green hospital in the southern part of Fulwood

Preston City Council Elections: Sharoe Green Ward
Party	Candidate	Votes	%	±%
Conservative	Eric Fazackerley	1,083	59.80	
Liberal Democrats	Michael Turner	511	28.22	
Labour	Pauline Sanderson	215	11.87	
Majority		572	31.62	

=== Sherwood ===
In the east of the town, against the rural border of Ribble Valley this ward of semi-rural housing and out-of-town industrial development was split in the subsequent boundary review.

Preston City Council Elections: Sherwood Ward (2 member election)
Party	Candidate	Votes	%	±%
Conservative	Marie Milne	1,291	31.93	
Conservative	Stuart Greenhalgh	1,288	31.86	
Labour	Angela Milne-Picken	403	9.97	
Labour	John Houghton	388	9.60	
Liberal Democrats	Margaret Maritan	349	8.63	
Liberal Democrats	John Smith	324	8.01	

=== St Matthews ===
The built up terraces and urban sprawl between the centre and the eastern extremities of Ribbleton. HMP Preston is in this ward.

Preston City Council Elections: St Matthews Ward
Party	Candidate	Votes	%	±%
Labour	Rose Kinsella	686	59.19	
Conservative	Elaine Pugh	185	15.96	
Independent	Paul Malliband	137	11.82	
Liberal Democrats	Anne-Marie Riedel	136	11.73	
Majority		501	43.79	

=== Tulketh ===
A ward in the central west of the town crossing the main east/west Blackpool road.

Preston City Council Elections: Tulketh Ward
Party	Candidate	Votes	%	±%
Labour	Jean al-Serraj	787	47.13	
Conservative	Stanley Baines	711	42.57	
Liberal Democrats	James MacGregor	170	10.18	
Majority		76	4.56	
