= Patrick Hurley =

Patrick Hurley may refer to:

- Patrick J. Hurley (1881–1963), American politician and diplomat
- Patrick Hurley (British politician), Labour Member of Parliament for Southport
