= Ronald Atkins =

British politician (1916–2020)

Member of Parliament for Preston North
- In office 28 February 1974 – 7 April 1979
- Preceded by: Mary Holt
- Succeeded by: Robert Atkins
- In office 31 March 1966 – 29 May 1970
- Preceded by: Julian Amery
- Succeeded by: Mary Holt

Personal details
- Born: Ronald Henry Atkins; 13 June 1916 Barry, Glamorgan, Wales
- Died: 30 December 2020 (aged 104) Avenham, Preston, England
- Party: Labour
- Spouses: Jesse Scott (m. 1950; div. 1979) Elizabeth Wildgoose (m. 2012)
- Children: 5, including Charlotte
- Education: Barry Grammar School
- Alma mater: University of London

Ronald Henry Atkins (13 June 1916 – 30 December 2020) was a British Labour politician who served as the Member of Parliament for Preston North for two terms: from 1966 until 1970, and from February 1974 until 1979. His career in British politics spanned nearly sixty years, from 1951 to 2010, including several decades as a councillor in local government, and nine years as a Member of Parliament.

A member of the Campaign for Nuclear Disarmament, Atkins took part in the Aldermaston marches, opposed the American war in Vietnam, and was a member of the Tribune group of left-wing Labour MPs. He also supported the campaigns by Tony Benn and Jeremy Corbyn to lead the Labour Party. In the course of his career, Atkins helped bring a polytechnic educational facility to Preston, which later became the University of Central Lancashire (UCLan).

From 2018 until his death, he was the oldest living former MP. He also became the longest-lived British MP with a registered date of birth, surviving to the age of 104.

== Early life and career ==
Atkins was born into a large Noncomformist family on 13 June 1916 in Barry, Glamorgan, the son of Frank Atkins, a master butcher, and his wife Elizabeth (nee Bryant). He grew up on a smallholding, and was educated at Barry Grammar School. Atkins suffered greatly from psoriasis, which led him to start working rather than going to university. He attended Southampton University, but his studies were interrupted by the Second World War, as well as his condition. He tried to improve his health in order to enter the armed forces by eating a carrot-only diet for more than a month. Eventually, he volunteered for industrial war work as a chief greaser with a chemical company in Barry, where he organised the company's first trade union branch. The poverty he saw in the port town inspired him to join the Labour Party. He later said "I've been a union man and a socialist all my life."

Atkins worked as a teacher from 1949 onwards. Having qualified as a teacher at Birkbeck College, University of London, he taught at a college of further education. Atkins also became a tutor and lecturer for the National Council of Labour Colleges. He was head of English at Halstead secondary school in Braintree, Essex. Whilst in Essex, Atkins became a councillor on Braintree Rural District Council, serving from 1952 to 1961. He was also on the Mid-Essex education committee of Essex County Council.

== Parliamentary career ==
In 2016, Atkins recalled "I became an applicant to become an MP, but I thought it was hopeless because I was so left wing." He first contested the marginal Lowestoft seat at the 1964 general election, but was unsuccessful. The outcome saw his party return to government with a slim majority; however, the presence of a Liberal Party candidate in the Suffolk constituency (which had previously been a two-way contest) took votes from both Atkins and his Conservative rival Jim Prior. Labour prime minister Harold Wilson called an election in 1966, and greatly increased his party's majority. Among the Labour gains was Atkins winning the marginal Preston North in Lancashire, unseating the Conservative former minister Julian Amery.

As a Member of Parliament, he lobbied Wilson for a new polytechnic institute of education in Preston, which lead to Preston Polytechnic being established in 1973; this, according to the Lancashire Post, was "one of his proudest moments". Atkins also successfully campaigned to save the Preston to Ormskirk railway line, which was under threat of closure. During this period, he chaired the all-party retirement group, who fought for early retirement, in 1967 presenting a petition to Parliament for voluntary male retirement at 60, which was signed by more than a million people. He also supported Liberal MP David Steel's abortion bill, which did not go down well with Preston's large Catholic population. He thought this may have cost him his seat at the subsequent 1970 general election: Atkins lost to the Conservative candidate Mary Holt, and Labour were out of power.

Following this, he lectured at Accrington College of Further Education until 1974, a year which saw two general elections take place. At the February 1974 election, Atkins won back Preston North, defeating Mary Holt by a majority of just 255 votes (0.63%). Labour formed a minority government, and Atkins was back in Parliament. Harold Wilson called another election for October 1974, in the hope of securing a majority. Atkins was re-elected with an increased vote share, and Labour won the election with a small overall majority, on the back of a pledge to hold a referendum on Britain's recent entry to the European Economic Community (EEC). In common with the left of his party at the time, Atkins was opposed to membership of the EEC. The 1975 referendum, however, resulted in a wide margin of victory for the 'Yes' campaign.

In 1976, Wilson stood down as prime minister, and in the resulting leadership election, Atkins helped organise left-winger Tony Benn's campaign. At the time, the leadership was voted on solely by the Parliamentary Labour Party. Benn came fourth on the first ballot with 37 votes, and withdrew from the contest, which was won by the more moderate Jim Callaghan, who thus became prime minister. According to The Guardian, "Atkins never sought high political office and it was never offered – he settled for being a constituency MP."

In 1979, following a vote of no confidence in the Labour government, another general election was held. The party lost on a decisive swing to the Conservatives, who won a comfortable majority. In a tight result which saw two recounts, Atkins was defeated by the (unrelated) Conservative candidate Robert Atkins, who won by just 29 votes (0.1%). Despite his name being mentioned in connection to winnable seats, Ronald Atkins did not stand for election to Parliament again.

== Outside Parliament ==
In between his two terms in Parliament, Atkins stood for election to Preston City Council's Ward No. 5 (Preston: Ribbleton) in 1973. He won a seat, serving until 1976, by which time he had returned to the House of Commons. Following the loss of his parliamentary seat in 1979, Atkins stood for the Park ward in Preston, which he won comfortably. He supported Preston Polytechnic becoming Lancashire Polytechnic, which took place in 1984.

His ward was abolished in boundary changes for the 1990 elections, and he instead stood in Avenham ward, which covered the central area of the town. The new boundaries meant that the whole council was up for election, rather than in thirds, as usually happened. In the multi-member ward, Atkins topped the poll, winning more votes than the two Labour candidates elected alongside him. In 1992, full university status was awarded to the Lancashire Polytechnic he had first lobbied for as Preston Polytechnic. That year, it became the University of Central Lancashire, which he had been "a powerful voice for".

In 2002, the next set of boundary changes saw Atkins' ward abolished again, with him instead standing in the Town Centre ward, and receiving more votes than the two Labour candidates who were also elected. In 2006, a year which saw poor performances by Labour in the local elections, Atkins fended off a strong challenge from the Respect Party to retain his seat by just seven votes. He remained a Labour councillor until 2010, when he stood down; aged 93, he was the oldest member of the council.

In August 2015, aged 99, during Jeremy Corbyn's leadership campaign, Atkins gave a speech introducing Corbyn at an event in Preston. Exclaiming "We love you!", he told the audience of several hundred people: "Jeremy Corbyn is not New Labour he is Real Labour." He was made Honorary President of Momentum for Central Lancashire. Atkins voted to leave the European Union (which had succeeded the EEC) in the 2016 referendum, later declaring: "It wasn't because of immigrants. The most important thing is our sovereignty."

== Personal life and death ==
In 1950, Atkins married Jesse Scott; the union ended in divorce in 1979. The couple had three sons and two twin daughters, Charlotte and Liz. At the two 1974 general elections, Atkins' stepson, Michael Atkins, contested Blackpool South, and Michael's wife, Kathleen E. Knight, stood in Fylde South, both as unsuccessful Labour candidates.

His daughter, Charlotte Atkins, was the Labour MP for Staffordshire Moorlands from 1997 until 2010. Atkins married his second wife, Elizabeth Alison Wildgoose in 2012, who was more than forty years his junior, shortly after she was elected to Ashton ward on Preston council. The couple lived in Frenchwood, Preston, with a dog, Rosie. His recreations were listed in Who's Who as "jazz, dancing, walking, local and national politics, connoisseur of good coffee"; he was an active ballroom dancer to late in life.

Following the death of John Freeman on 20 December 2014, Atkins became the oldest surviving former MP. He celebrated his 100th birthday in June 2016, attributing his long life to "good genes, an active lifestyle, and wild Atlantic salmon" in his diet. Interviewed by the Lancashire Post to mark the occasion, he added there was "some luck too", noting, "I've escaped assassination as an MP."

On 30 August 2018, Atkins became the longest-lived MP ever, surpassing Theodore Taylor's record. Atkins died at his home in Preston on 30 December 2020, at the age of 104. He was survived by Elizabeth, his daughters Charlotte and Liz, and his stepson Donald (from his first marriage). Upon his death, his widow Elizabeth, who was still a councillor, said "He was staunch Labour all his life and highly respected. He was a real guiding force; the Labour group in Preston called him 'the guru'."

== See also ==
- Records of members of parliament of the United Kingdom

Parliament of the United Kingdom
| Preceded by Julian Amery | Member of Parliament for Preston North; 1966–1970 | Succeeded by Mary Holt |
| Preceded by Mary Holt | Member of Parliament for Preston North; February 1974–1979 | Succeeded by Robert Atkins |
