= 2014 Preston City Council election =

2014 UK local government election

Results of the 2014 Preston City Council election

Council elections for the City of Preston, Lancashire were held on 22 May 2014 as part of the 2014 United Kingdom local elections. The elections were moved from earlier on in May to coincide with the North West component of the 2014 European Parliament election. Nineteen electoral wards were fought with those councillors elected in the corresponding elections in 2010 defending their seats due to the "in thirds" system employed in Preston local elections. The previous elections to Preston council occurred in 2012 but due to the "in thirds" system employed by Preston council, councillors are elected for four-year terms. This means gains, losses, and vote share comparisons this year are with those fought in 2010.

All locally registered electors (British, Irish, Commonwealth and European Union citizens) who were aged 18 or over on Thursday 22 May 2014 were entitled to vote in the local elections. Those who were temporarily away from their ordinary address (for example, away working, on holiday, in student accommodation or in hospital) were also entitled to vote in the local elections, although those who had moved abroad and registered as overseas electors cannot vote in the local elections. It is possible to register to vote at more than one address (such as a university student who had a term-time address and lives at home during holidays) at the discretion of the local Electoral Register Office, but it remains an offence to vote more than once in the same local government election.

== Election result ==
Preston local election result 2014
| Party | Seats | Gains | Losses | Net gain/loss | Seats % | Votes % | Votes | +/− |
|---|---|---|---|---|---|---|---|---|
| Labour | 11 | +1 | | +1 | | | 13,831 | −5,490 |
| Conservative | 6 | | | N/C | | | 8,236 | −9,860 |
| UKIP | 0 | | | N/C | | | 4,127 | +4,127 |
| Liberal Democrats | 2 | | | N/C | | | 2,782 | −13,000 |
| Green | 0 | | | N/C | | | 377 | +179 |
| Independent | 1 | | 1 | -1 | | | 113 | +113 |

== Ward results ==
=== Brookfield ===
Preston Council election, 2014: Brookfield
| Party | Candidate | Votes | % | ±% |
|---|---|---|---|---|
| Labour | John Browne | 870 | 54.9 | +2.9 |
| UKIP | James Barker | 523 | 33.0 | N/A |
| Conservative | Bowen Perryman | 191 | 12.1 | −18.2 |
| Majority | | 347 | 21.9 | |
| Turnout | | | 28.7 | |
| Labour hold | | Swing | | |

=== Cadley ===
Preston Council elections, 2014: Cadley
| Party | Candidate | Votes | % | ±% |
|---|---|---|---|---|
| Liberal Democrats | Stephen Mullen | 728 | 44.1 | −2.6 |
| Conservative | Rowena Edmonson | 492 | 29.8 | −3.3 |
| Labour | George Tait | 430 | 26.1 | +5.9 |
| Majority | | 298 | 14.3 | |
| Turnout | | 58.1 | | |
| Liberal Democrats hold | | Swing | | |

=== College ===
Preston Council election, 2014: College
| Party | Candidate | Votes | % | ±% |
|---|---|---|---|---|
| Conservative | Bobby Cartwright | 569 | 43.2 | −2.3 |
| Labour | Peter Moss | 508 | 38.5 | +10.4 |
| UKIP | John Bottomley | 140 | 10.6 | N/A |
| Liberal Democrats | Mike Turner | 101 | 7.7 | −18.6 |
| Majority | | 61 | 4.6 | |
| Turnout | | | 46.2 | |

=== Fishwick ===
Preston Council election, 2014: Fishwick
| Party | Candidate | Votes | % | ±% |
|---|---|---|---|---|
| Labour | Zafar Coupland | 1,055 | 80.4 | +19.6 |
| Conservative | Patricia Gravner | 258 | 19.6 | +1.5 |
| Majority | | 797 | 60.7 | |
| Turnout | | | 35.9 | |

=== Garrison ===
Preston Council election, 2014: Garrison
| Party | Candidate | Votes | % | ±% |
|---|---|---|---|---|
| Conservative | Charlotte Leach | 740 | 37.8 | −8.8 |
| Labour | Steve Ratcliffe | 541 | 27.6 | −0.9 |
| UKIP | Liz Mahon | 427 | 21.8 | N/A |
| Green | Bill Houghton | 129 | 6.6 | N/A |
| Liberal Democrats | Julie Voges | 122 | 6.2 | −18.2 |
| Majority | | 199 | 10.2 | |
| Turnout | | | 34.9 | |

=== Greyfriars ===
Preston Council election, 2014: Greyfriars
| Party | Candidate | Votes | % | ±% |
|---|---|---|---|---|
| Conservative | David Hammond | 1,230 | 55.0 | +8.4 |
| Labour | Alan Woods | 472 | 21.1 | −7.4 |
| UKIP | Christine Phipps | 346 | 15.5 | N/A |
| Liberal Democrats | Peter Holt-Mylorie | 189 | 8.4 | −16.0 |
| Majority | | 758 | 33.9 | |
| Turnout | | | 42.7 | |

=== Ingol ===
Preston Council election, 2014: Ingol
| Party | Candidate | Votes | % | ±% |
|---|---|---|---|---|
| Liberal Democrats | Neil Darby | 660 | 34.5 | −14.1 |
| UKIP | Chris Rigby | 537 | 28.1 | N/A |
| Labour | Lynne Wallace | 491 | 25.7 | +0.2 |
| Conservative | Daniel Dewhurst | 224 | 11.7 | −14.1 |
| Majority | | 123 | 6.4 | |
| Turnout | | | 34.1 | |

=== Larches ===
Preston Council election, 2014: Larches
| Party | Candidate | Votes | % | ±% |
|---|---|---|---|---|
| Labour | Phil Crowe | 1,049 | 59.4 | +19.6 |
| Conservative | Robert Cartwright | 369 | 20.9 | −0.9 |
| Liberal Democrats | Rebecca Finch | 349 | 19.8 | −18.6 |
| Majority | | 680 | 38.5 | |
| Turnout | | | 30.5 | |

=== Lea ===
Preston Council election, 2014: Lea
| Party | Candidate | Votes | % | ±% |
|---|---|---|---|---|
| Conservative | Christine Abram | 654 | 37.1 | −5.2 |
| Liberal Democrats | Jason Jeffrey | 396 | 22.5 | −14.3 |
| UKIP | Claire Kilbane | 393 | 22.3 | N/A |
| Labour | Rebecca Yates | 318 | 18.1 | −2.8 |
| Majority | | 258 | 14.7 | |
| Turnout | | | 37.2 | |

=== Moor Park ===
Preston Council election, 2014: Moor Park
| Party | Candidate | Votes | % | ±% |
|---|---|---|---|---|
| Labour | John Collins | 724 | 73.3 | +20.2 |
| Conservative | Sheila Heys | 133 | 13.5 | −8.3 |
| Green | Ian McCormick | 131 | 13.3 | N/A |
| Majority | | 591 | 59.8 | |
| Turnout | | | 30.5 | |

=== Preston Rural North ===
Preston Council election, 2014: Preston Rural North
| Party | Candidate | Votes | % | ±% |
|---|---|---|---|---|
| Conservative | Sue Whittam | 1,181 | 55.9 | −12.8 |
| UKIP | Kate Walsh | 527 | 24.9 | N/A |
| Labour | Gerard Parke-Hatton | 278 | 13.2 | +1.2 |
| Liberal Democrats | Peter Lawrence | 127 | 6.0 | −13.3 |
| Majority | | 654 | 31.0 | |
| Turnout | | | 39.2 | |

=== Ribbleton ===
Preston Council election, 2014: Ribbleton
| Party | Candidate | Votes | % | ±% |
|---|---|---|---|---|
| Labour | Jonathan Saksena | 772 | 53.9 | +5.8 |
| UKIP | David Treasure | 468 | 32.7 | N/A |
| Conservative | Daryl Bamber | 191 | 13.3 | −7.3 |
| Majority | | 304 | 21.2 | |
| Turnout | | | 23.7 | |

=== Riversway ===
Preston Council election, 2014: Riversway
| Party | Candidate | Votes | % | ±% |
|---|---|---|---|---|
| Labour | Peter Kelly | 1,121 | 80.9 | |
| Conservative | Sharon Riley | 265 | 19.1 | |
| Majority | | 856 | 61.8 | |
| Turnout | | | 33.3 | |

=== Sharoe Green ===
Preston Council election, 2014: Sharoe Green
| Party | Candidate | Votes | % | ±% |
|---|---|---|---|---|
| Conservative | Margaret McManus | 754 | 36.2 | −7.8 |
| Labour | John Wilson | 665 | 32.0 | +5.8 |
| UKIP | Les Nyogeri | 435 | 20.9 | N/A |
| Green | Helen Disley | 117 | 5.6 | +1.7 |
| Liberal Democrats | Gregory Vickers | 110 | 5.3 | −20.6 |
| Majority | | 89 | 4.3 | |
| Turnout | | | 41.8 | |

=== St George's ===
Preston Council election, 2014: St George's
| Party | Candidate | Votes | % | ±% |
|---|---|---|---|---|
| Labour | James Hull | 849 | 87.9 | +24.2 |
| Conservative | Grant Dowbekin | 117 | 12.1 | −1.2 |
| Majority | | 732 | | |
| Turnout | | | 31.7 | |

=== St Matthew's ===
Preston Council election, 2014: St Matthew's
| Party | Candidate | Votes | % | ±% |
|---|---|---|---|---|
| Labour | Roy Leeming | 1,177 | 86.7 | +22.9 |
| Conservative | Linda Hubberstey | 181 | 13.3 | −1.7 |
| Majority | | 996 | 73.3 | |
| Turnout | | | 26.2 | |

=== Town Centre ===
Due to the retirement of Michael Lavellette (Independent Socialist) there was a double election here, making direct comparisons with the corresponding 2010 election inaccurate.

Preston Council election, 2014: Town Centre ward 2014
| Party | Candidate | Votes | % | ±% |
|---|---|---|---|---|
| Labour | Salim Desai | 1,323 | | |
| Labour | Drew Gale | 1,202 | | |
| Conservative | Louise Petherwick | 357 | | |

=== Tulketh ===
Preston Council election, 2014: Tulketh
| Party | Candidate | Votes | % | ±% |
|---|---|---|---|---|
| Labour | Peter Rankin | 804 | 54.4 | +14.6 |
| UKIP | Paul Barker | 331 | 22.4 | N/A |
| Conservative | Stephen Allen | 209 | 14.2 | −7.9 |
| Independent | Roger Baines | 113 | 9.0 | N/A |
| Majority | | 473 | 32.0 | |
| Turnout | | | 28.6 | |

=== University ===
Preston Council election, 2014: University
| Party | Candidate | Votes | % | ±% |
|---|---|---|---|---|
| Labour | Carl Crompton | 444 | 78.6 | +30.0 |
| Conservative | Jonty Campbell | 121 | 21.4 | −3.9 |
| Majority | | 323 | 57.2 | |
| Turnout | | | 20.8 | |
