= Preston North =

Parliamentary constituency in the United Kingdom, 1950–1983

- Former borough constituency for the House of Commons
- Preston North in Lancashire, showing boundaries used from 1974–1983
- County: Lancashire
- Major settlements: Preston

1950–1983
- Seats: One
- Created from: Preston
- Replaced by: Preston and Ribble Valley

Preston North was a parliamentary constituency in Lancashire, which returned one Member of Parliament (MP) to the House of Commons of the Parliament of the United Kingdom. The constituency was created by the House of Commons (Redistribution of Seats) Act 1949 for the 1950 general election by division of the former two-seat Preston constituency, and abolished for the 1983 general election. Some of the constituency's former territory was then incorporated within a new single-seat Preston constituency, and parts of Preston North became elements within Fylde and Ribble Valley.

The modern Preston is a safe seat for Labour, but historically Preston North was one of the most marginal constituencies in the country.

== Boundaries ==
1950–1974: The County Borough of Preston wards of Deepdale, Fishwick, Moorbrook, Park, and Ribbleton, and the Urban District of Fulwood.

1974–1983: The County Borough of Preston wards of Deepdale, Fishwick, Moorbrook, Park, St Matthew's, and Ribbleton, and the Urban District of Fulwood. The constituency boundaries remained unchanged.

== Members of Parliament ==
Election	Member	Party
1950	Julian Amery	Conservative
1966	Ronald Atkins	Labour
1970	Mary Holt	Conservative
Feb 1974	Ronald Atkins	Labour
1979	Robert Atkins	Conservative
1983	constituency abolished: see Preston	

- Ronald Atkins (Labour) and Robert Atkins (Conservative) are unrelated.

== Election results ==
=== Elections in the 1950s ===
General election 1950: Preston North
Party	Candidate	Votes	%	±%
Conservative	Julian Amery	21,880	48.4	
Labour	Samuel Segal	20,950	46.3	
Liberal	Charles Joseph Hemelryk	2,012	4.5	
Communist	Pat Devine	366	0.8	
Majority		930	2.1	
Turnout		45,208	86.8	
Conservative win (new seat)				

General election 1951: Preston North
Party	Candidate	Votes	%	±%
Conservative	Julian Amery	23,598	51.2	+2.8
Labour	Thomas Hourigan	22,490	48.8	+2.5
Majority		1,108	2.3	+0.2
Turnout		46,088	87.5	+0.7
Conservative hold		Swing		

General election 1955: Preston North
Party	Candidate	Votes	%	±%
Conservative	Julian Amery	22,310	53.5	+2.3
Labour	Edgar Hewitt	19,407	46.5	−2.3
Majority		2,903	7.0	+4.6
Turnout		41,717	81.4	−6.1
Conservative hold		Swing		

General election 1959: Preston North
Party	Candidate	Votes	%	±%
Conservative	Julian Amery	23,990	55.1	+1.6
Labour	Arthur Davidson	19,529	44.9	−1.6
Majority		4,461	10.2	+3.2
Turnout		43,519	83.4	+2.0
Conservative hold		Swing	+1.6	

=== Elections in the 1960s ===
General election 1964: Preston North
Party	Candidate	Votes	%	±%
Conservative	Julian Amery	20,566	50.0	−5.1
Labour	Russell Kerr	20,552	50.0	+5.1
Majority		14	0.0	−10.2
Turnout		41,118	78.7	−4.7
Conservative hold		Swing		

General election 1966: Preston North
Party	Candidate	Votes	%	±%
Labour	Ronald Atkins	21,539	53.0	+3.0
Conservative	Julian Amery	19,121	47.0	−3.0
Majority		2,418	6.0	N/A
Turnout		50,140	81.1	+2.4
Labour gain from Conservative		Swing		

=== Elections in the 1970s ===
General election 1970: Preston North
Party	Candidate	Votes	%	±%
Conservative	Mary Holt	20,102	50.6	+3.6
Labour	Ronald Atkins	17,140	43.2	−9.8
Liberal	Derrick Trevor Jones	2,458	6.2	New
Majority		2,962	7.4	N/A
Turnout		51,655	76.9	−4.2
Conservative gain from Labour		Swing		

General election February 1974: Preston North
Party	Candidate	Votes	%	±%
Labour	Ronald Atkins	16,797	41.5	−1.7
Conservative	Mary Holt	16,542	40.9	−9.7
Liberal	Gordon Payne	7,099	17.6	+11.4
Majority		255	0.63	New
Turnout		50,885	79.4	+2.5
Labour gain from Conservative		Swing		

General election October 1974: Preston North
Party	Candidate	Votes	%	±%
Labour	Ronald Atkins	18,044	45.8	+4.3
Conservative	Mary Holt	16,260	41.3	+0.4
Liberal	Gordon Payne	4,948	12.6	−5.0
More Prosperous Britain	Harold Smith	138	0.4	New
Majority		1,784	4.53	+3.90
Turnout		51,369	76.7	−2.7
Labour hold		Swing		

General election 1979: Preston North
Party	Candidate	Votes	%	±%
Conservative	Robert Atkins	18,632	46.3	+5.0
Labour	Ronald Atkins	18,603	46.2	+0.4
Liberal	Michael Paul Braham	2,715	6.7	−5.9
National Front	John Farran Hetherington	329	0.8	New
Majority		29	0.07	N/A
Turnout		51,756	77.8	+1.1
Conservative gain from Labour		Swing		

== See also ==
- Wyre and Preston North
- Preston (UK Parliament constituency)
- Ribble Valley
