= Mary Holt =

British politician (1924–2021)

Member of Parliament for Preston North
- In office 18 June 1970 – 8 February 1974
- Preceded by: Ronald Atkins
- Succeeded by: Ronald Atkins

Personal details
- Born: 31 July 1924
- Died: 17 February 2021 (aged 96) Fulwood, Preston, England
- Party: Conservative
- Education: Girton College, Cambridge

Mary Holt (31 July 1924 – 17 February 2021) was a British Conservative politician, barrister and judge.

== Early life ==
Holt was born in July 1924. She was educated at Park School in Preston and gained her degrees, an MA and LLB with honours, from Girton College, Cambridge.

== Career ==
Holt became a barrister in 1949 and practiced on the Northern Circuit. She was the member of parliament (MP) for Preston North from 1970 to 1974, when she lost the seat in the February election of that year to Labour's Ronald Atkins (from whom she had won the seat in 1970). She was the first woman to hold the Preston North seat. In Parliament, she was an advocate for the Domicile and Matrimonial Proceedings Act 1973, which allowed wives to have different addresses to their husbands. Her attempt to regain the seat in the October 1974 election was unsuccessful. Holt served as a circuit judge from 1977 to 1995.

== Personal life ==
Holt never married. She died in Fulwood, Preston in February 2021 at the age of 96, weeks after the death of her predecessor (and successor) Ronald Atkins at 104.

Parliament of the United Kingdom
Preceded by Ronald Atkins	Member of Parliament for Preston North; 1970–February 1974	Succeeded by Ronald Atkins
