= 1996 Preston Borough Council election =

1996 UK local government election

The 1996 Preston Borough Council election for the Preston Borough Council was held in May 1996. One third of the council was up for election.

== Ashton ==
Preston City Council Elections: Ashton Ward
Party	Candidate	Votes	%	±%
Labour	M Routledge	1,093	52.12	
Conservative	K Peet	1,004	47.88	

== Avenham ==
Preston City Council Elections: Avenham Ward
Party	Candidate	Votes	%	±%
Labour	Ken Cole	961	68.59	
Conservative	Sheila Heys	231	16.49	
Liberal Democrats	Margaret Marshall	209	14.91	

== Brookfield ==
Preston City Council Elections: Brookfield Ward
Party	Candidate	Votes	%	±%
Labour	J Browne	844	69.69	
Conservative	Keith Sedgewick	270	22.30	
Liberal Democrats	M Middleton	97	8.01	

== Cadley ==
Preston City Council Elections: Cadley Ward
Party	Candidate	Votes	%	±%
Liberal Democrats	W Borrow	1,555	62.50	
Conservative	S Bentham	801	32.19	
Labour	J Swindells	132	5.31	

== Central ==
Preston City Council Elections: Central Ward
Party	Candidate	Votes	%	±%
Labour	S Natha	1,008	84.1	
Liberal Democrats	A Yusuf	190	15.9	

== Deepdale ==
Preston City Council Elections: Deepdale Ward
Party	Candidate	Votes	%	±%
Labour	A Jones	877	62.0	
Liberal Democrats	Y Zinga	537	38.0	

== Fishwick ==
Preston City Council Elections: Fishwick Ward
Party	Candidate	Votes	%	±%
Labour	Harold Parker	866	71.28	
Conservative	S Brown	185	15.3	
Liberal Democrats	Wilf Gavin	164	13.50	

== Greyfriars ==
Preston City Council Elections: Greyfriars Ward
Party	Candidate	Votes	%	±%
Conservative	J Hood	1,386	51.87	
Liberal Democrats	C Spencer	1,141	42.70	
Labour	A Milne-Picken	145	5.43	

== Ingol ==
Preston City Council Elections: Ingol Ward
Party	Candidate	Votes	%	±%
Liberal Democrats	William Chadwick	1,163	71.31	
Labour	C Abbot	327	20.05	
Conservative	D Barber	141	8.65	

== Larches ==
Preston City Council Elections: Larches Ward
Party	Candidate	Votes	%	±%
Liberal Democrats	A Foster	818	46.58	
Labour	G Walmsley	667	37.98	
Conservative	M Gildert	271	15.43	

== Moor Park ==
Preston City Council Elections: Moor Park Ward
Party	Candidate	Votes	%	±%
Labour	H Evans	1,027	58.42	
Conservative	P Balshaw	468	26.62	
Liberal Democrats	P Rainford	263	14.96	

== Preston Rural East ==
Preston City Council Elections: Rural East Ward
Party	Candidate	Votes	%	±%
Conservative	G Swarbrick	1,261	69.78	
Liberal Democrats	Edward Rowland	276	15.27	
Labour	M Campbell	270	14.94	

== Preston Rural West ==
Preston City Council Elections: Rural West Ward
Party	Candidate	Votes	%	±%
Liberal Democrats	M Basford	1,308	49.92	
Conservative	W Hunter	1,019	38.89	
Labour	M Clegg	293	11.18	

== Ribbleton ==
Preston City Council Elections: Ribbleton Ward
Party	Candidate	Votes	%	±%
Labour	Peter Rankin	922	75.64	
Conservative	Jane Balshaw	182	14.93	
Liberal Democrats	K Nash	115	9.43	

== Riversway ==
Preston City Council Elections: Riversway Ward
Party	Candidate	Votes	%	±%
Labour	A Reid	1,018	67.33	
Conservative	M Taylor	269	17.79	
Liberal Democrats	J Abram	225	14.88	

== Sharoe Green ==
Preston City Council Elections: Sharoe Green Ward
Party	Candidate	Votes	%	±%
Liberal Democrats	J Whittle	953	44.08	
Conservative	A Scott	875	40.47	
Labour	P Malliband	334	15.45	

== Sherwood ==
Preston City Council Elections: Sherwood Ward
Party	Candidate	Votes	%	±%
Conservative	J Parry	1,141	49.72	
Labour	J Morley	997	29.80	
Labour	M Maritan	470	20.48	

== St Matthews ==
Preston City Council Elections: St Matthews Ward
Party	Candidate	Votes	%	±%
Labour	Veronica Afrin	949	73.62	
Conservative	P Pugh	226	17.53	
Liberal Democrats	C Fell	114	8.84	

== Tulketh ==
Preston City Council Elections: Tulketh Ward
Party	Candidate	Votes	%	±%
Labour	Valerie Wise	1,180	53.11	
Conservative	Stanley Baines	1,042	46.89	

== See also ==
- Preston City Council elections
