= 2019 Preston City Council election =

2019 UK local government election

Results by ward

Council elections for the Preston City Council were held on 2 May 2019 as part of the 2019 United Kingdom local elections. The Council has undergone a wholesale boundary revision, reducing the number of both Councillors and electoral wards, resulting in the first 'all out' election since 2002 Preston Council election.

All locally registered electors (British, Irish, Commonwealth and European Union citizens) who are aged 18 or over on polling day are entitled to vote in the local elections.

The boundary changes for 2019 reduced the number of Councillors from 57 to 48.

== Results summary ==
The new electoral wards each elect three members.

The results of the 2019 elections are summarised below.

Ward	Labour	Conservative	Liberal Democrats
Ashton	3	0	0
Brookfield	3	0	0
Cadley	0	0	3
City Centre	3	0	0
Deepdale	3	0	0
Fishwick and Frenchwood	3	0	0
Garrison	3	0	0
Greyfriars	0	0	3
Ingol and Cottam	0	0	3
Lea and Larches	3	0	0
Plungington	3	0	0
Preston Rural East	0	3	0
Preston Rural North	0	3	0
Ribbleton	3	0	0
Sharoe Green	0	3	0
St Matthew’s	3	0	0

== Election result ==
Preston City Council Local Election 2019
Party	Seats	Gains	Losses	Net gain/loss	Seats %	Votes %	Votes	+/−
Labour	30		-5	-5	62.5	47.62	37,565	-11,230
Conservative	9		-8	-8	18.75	27.62	21,790	-13,064
Liberal Democrats	9	+4		+4	18.75	20.00	15,776	+4,296
UKIP	0			0	0	2.27	1,789	-4,842
Green	0			0	0	0.52	413	-3,288
Independent	0			0	0	0.79	620	+620
Independent	0			0	0	0.77	607	+607
Independent	0			0	0	0.41	324	+324

== Ward results ==
=== Ashton ===
Preston City Council Election, 2019: Ashton
Party	Candidate	Votes	%	±%
Labour	Elizabeth Atkins	932	45.13	
Labour	Robert Boswell	884	42.81	
Labour	Mark Routledge	871	42.18	
Independent	Beth Balshaw	620	30.02	
Independent	Mike Balshaw	607	29.39	
Conservative	Luke Walmsley	314	15.21	
Conservative	David Dwyer	299	14.48	
UKIP	Simon Platt	282	13.66	
Conservative	Tes Slater	275	13.32	
Liberal Democrats	Jeremy Dable	222	10.75	
Liberal Democrats	Rebecca Potter	197	9.54	
Liberal Democrats	Christopher Finch	148	7.17	
Turnout		2,065	32.9	
Labour win (new seat)				
Labour win (new seat)				
Labour win (new seat)				

=== Brookfield ===
Preston City Council election, 2019: Brookfield
Party	Candidate	Votes	%	±%
Labour	John Browne	781	57.22	
Labour	Philip Corker	730	53.48	
Labour	Nerys Eaves	685	50.18	
UKIP	Anthony Helps	356	26.08	
Conservative	Mary Kennedy	255	18.68	
Conservative	Bowan Perryman	211	15.46	
Conservative	Andrew Pratt	162	11.87	
Liberal Democrats	Fiona Duke	155	11.36	
Liberal Democrats	Jurgen Voges	127	9.30	
Turnout		1,365	23.9	
Labour win (new seat)				
Labour win (new seat)				
Labour win (new seat)				

=== Cadley ===
Preston City Council election, 2019: Cadley
Party	Candidate	Votes	%	±%
Liberal Democrats	John Potter	1,173	56.31	
Liberal Democrats	Claire Craven	1,125	54.01	
Liberal Democrats	Debbie Shannon	1,077	51.70	
Labour	Harry Spillman	483	23.19	
Labour	James Hull	480	23.04	
Labour	Robert Wood	462	22.18	
Conservative	Paul Balshaw	421	20.21	
Conservative	Jim Witherington	365	17.52	
Conservative	Simon Crowe	342	16.42	
Turnout		2,083	34.3	
Liberal Democrats win (new seat)				
Liberal Democrats win (new seat)				
Liberal Democrats win (new seat)				

=== City Centre ===
Preston City Council election, 2019: City Centre
Party	Candidate	Votes	%	±%
Labour	Carol Henshaw	1,201	70.23	
Labour	Peter Moss	1,167	68.25	
Labour	Salim Desai	1,162	67.95	
Conservative	Pamela Homer	237	13.86	
Liberal Democrats	Harshad Chauhan	229	13.39	
Liberal Democrats	Ennis O'Donnell	221	12.92	
Conservative	Connor Rumble	212	12.40	
Conservative	Munirah Patel	199	11.64	
Turnout		1,710	24.9	
Labour win (new seat)				
Labour win (new seat)				
Labour win (new seat)				

=== Deepdale ===
Preston City Council election, 2019: Deepdale
Party	Candidate	Votes	%	±%
Labour	Issi Bax	1,775	87.44	
Labour	Zafar Coupland	1,699	83.69	
Labour	Siraz Natha	1,677	82.61	
Conservative	Keith Sedgwick	144	7.09	
Liberal Democrats	Stephen Mullen	140	6.90	
Conservative	William King	135	6.65	
Conservative	Deborah Bellevue de Sylva	134	6.60	
Liberal Democrats	Benjamin Ward	100	4.93	
Turnout		2,030	32.9	
Labour win (new seat)				
Labour win (new seat)				
Labour win (new seat)				

=== Fishwick and Frenchwood ===
Preston City Council election, 2019: Fishwick and Frenchwood
Party	Candidate	Votes	%	±%
Labour	Yakub Patel	1,382	80.16	
Labour	Whitney Hawkins	1,233	71.52	
Labour	Martyn Rawlinson	1,193	69.20	
Conservative	Danielle Butler	208	12.06	
Conservative	Colin Homer	162	9.40	
Conservative	Fay Whittam	162	9.40	
Liberal Democrats	Peter Newsham	152	8.82	
Liberal Democrats	Michael Yates	121	7.02	
Turnout		1,724	30.5	
Labour win (new seat)				
Labour win (new seat)				
Labour win (new seat)				

=== Garrison ===
Preston City Council election, 2019: Garrison
Party	Candidate	Votes	%	±%
Labour	Freddie Bailey	1,294	56.46	
Labour	Lynne Brooks	1,073	46.82	
Labour	Peter Kelly	1,013	44.20	
Conservative	Stuart Greenhalgh	819	35.73	
Conservative	Paul Whalley	748	32.64	
Conservative	Mehfuz Dasu Patel	676	29.49	
Liberal Democrats	Michael Turner	293	12.78	
Liberal Democrats	Pamela Potter	290	12.65	
Liberal Democrats	Hans Voges	237	10.34	
Turnout		2,292	34.8	
Labour win (new seat)				
Labour win (new seat)				
Labour win (new seat)				

=== Greyfriars ===
Preston City Council election, 2019: Greyfriars
Party	Candidate	Votes	%	±%
Liberal Democrats	Tony Raisbeck	1,221	47.00	
Liberal Democrats	Daniel Gregg	1,151	44.30	
Liberal Democrats	Alexander Warren	1,069	41.15	
Conservative	Tim Cox	754	29.02	
Conservative	Graham Jolliffe	684	26.33	
Conservative	Lakwinder Singh	684	26.33	
Labour	Alan Woods	561	21.59	
Labour	Ted Smith	487	18.75	
Labour	Stacey Thoburn	441	16.97	
Independent	Rowena Edmondson	324	12.47	
Turnout		2,598	41.3	
Liberal Democrats win (new seat)				
Liberal Democrats win (new seat)				
Liberal Democrats win (new seat)				

=== Ingol and Cottam ===
Preston City Council election, 2019: Ingol and Cottam
Party	Candidate	Votes	%	±%
Liberal Democrats	Pauline Brown	871	44.58	
Liberal Democrats	Neil Darby	861	44.06	
Liberal Democrats	Mark Jewell	758	38.79	
Conservative	Trevor Hart	625	31.99	
Conservative	Judith Parker	577	29.53	
Conservative	Martin McKeever	513	26.25	
Labour	Julie Humphrey	331	16.94	
Labour	Barry McLoughlin	295	15.10	
Labour	Joseph Maclaren	287	14.69	
UKIP	Nicola Suggate	275	14.07	
Turnout		1,954	30.4	
Liberal Democrats win (new seat)				
Liberal Democrats win (new seat)				
Liberal Democrats win (new seat)				

=== Lea and Larches ===
Preston City Council election, 2019: Lea and Larches
Party	Candidate	Votes	%	±%
Labour	Phil Crowe	735	44.87	
Labour	David Borrow	731	44.63	
Labour	Jennifer Mein	684	41.76	
Conservative	David Callaghan	403	24.60	
Conservative	James Doyle	359	21.92	
UKIP	Mark Kingsley	352	21.49	
Conservative	Monwara Amin	326	19.90	
Liberal Democrats	Edward Craven	282	17.22	
Liberal Democrats	Jason Higham	258	15.75	
Liberal Democrats	Jeffrey Jason	179	10.93	
Turnout		1,638	25.2	
Labour win (new seat)				
Labour win (new seat)				
Labour win (new seat)				

=== Plungington ===
Preston City Council election, 2019: Plungington
Party	Candidate	Votes	%	±%
Labour	Matthew Brown	941	70.70	
Labour	Pav Akhtar	868	65.21	
Labour	Nweeda Khan	822	61.76	
Conservative	Pauline Littlefair	201	15.10	
Conservative	Jonty Campbell	191	14.35	
Liberal Democrats	Graham Briggs	176	13.22	
Conservative	Jayne Tully	171	12.85	
Liberal Democrats	Ian McDougall	140	10.52	
Liberal Democrats	Peter Holt-Mylroie	139	10.44	
Turnout		1,331	20.7	
Labour win (new seat)				
Labour win (new seat)				
Labour win (new seat)				

=== Preston Rural East ===
Preston City Council election, 2019: Preston Rural East
Party	Candidate	Votes	%	±%
Conservative	Harry Landless	1,245	64.27	
Conservative	Ron Woollam	1,188	61.33	
Conservative	Ian Donnell	999	51.57	
Labour	Susan Crawshaw	335	17.29	
Labour	George Tait	322	16.62	
Liberal Democrats	Joanne Joyner	303	15.64	
Labour	Andrew MacLaren	299	15.44	
Liberal Democrats	Edgar Arbidans	270	13.94	
Liberal Democrats	Peter Lawrence	239	12.34	
Turnout		1,937	34.0	
Conservative win (new seat)				
Conservative win (new seat)				
Conservative win (new seat)				

=== Preston Rural North ===
Preston City Council election, 2019: Preston Rural North
Party	Candidate	Votes	%	±%
Conservative	Sue Whittam	885	58.73	
Conservative	Charles Latchford	846	56.14	
Conservative	Keith Middlebrough	842	55.87	
Liberal Democrats	Sandra Finch	230	15.26	
UKIP	Craig Easton	224	14.86	
Labour	Rebecca Boswell	221	14.66	
Liberal Democrats	Peter Johnstone	216	14.33	
Labour	Alan Dent	209	13.87	
Labour	Michael Farrington	204	13.54	
Liberal Democrats	Matthew Raisbeck	198	13.14	
Turnout		1,507	33.9	
Conservative win (new seat)				
Conservative win (new seat)				
Conservative win (new seat)				

=== Ribbleton ===
Preston City Council election, 2019: Ribbleton
Party	Candidate	Votes	%	±%
Labour	Nick Pomfret	655	48.23	
Labour	Jonathan Saksena	551	40.57	
Labour	Brian Rollo	547	40.28	
UKIP	Andrew Watt	300	22.09	
Conservative	Robert Jones	188	13.84	
Liberal Democrats	Luke Bosman	146	10.75	
Liberal Democrats	Robert Ash	136	10.01	
Conservative	Mary Kudi	133	9.79	
Conservative	Issa Dasu Patel	115	8.47	
Turnout		1,358	23.4	
Labour win (new seat)				
Labour win (new seat)				
Labour win (new seat)				

=== Sharoe Green ===
Preston City Council election, 2019: Sharoe Green
Party	Candidate	Votes	%	±%
Conservative	Daniel Duckworth	1,036	44.18	
Conservative	Maxwell Green	1,003	42.77	
Conservative	David Walker	960	40.94	
Labour	Kathleen Atkins	839	35.78	
Labour	Craig Forrest	764	32.58	
Labour	Samir Vohra	698	29.77	
Green	Helen Disley	413	17.61	
Liberal Democrats	George Kulbacki	287	12.24	
Liberal Democrats	Thomas Hackett	268	11.43	
Liberal Democrats	Gregory Vickers	215	9.17	
Turnout		2,345	37.9	
Conservative win (new seat)				
Conservative win (new seat)				
Conservative win (new seat)				

=== St. Matthew's ===
Preston City Council election, 2019: St. Matthew's
Party	Candidate	Votes	%	±%
Labour	Javed Iqbal	903	80.41	
Labour	Jade Morgan	836	74.40	
Labour	Jono Grisdale	822	73.20	
Conservative	Frank Parker	162	14.43	
Conservative	Parviz Shahsvar	111	9.88	
Conservative	Sharon Shahsvar	109	9.71	
Liberal Democrats	Michael Basford	102	9.08	
Liberal Democrats	Jeffrey Abram	99	8.82	
Turnout		1,123	20.5	
Labour win (new seat)				
Labour win (new seat)				
Labour win (new seat)				
