= 2021 Preston City Council election =

2021 UK local government election

Results by ward

The 2021 Preston City Council election to elect members of Preston City Council. happened on the same day as other local elections. The election was originally due to take place in May 2020, but was postponed due to the COVID-19 pandemic.

Council elections for the Preston City Council were last held on 2 May 2019 as part of the 2019 United Kingdom local elections. The council underwent a wholesale boundary revision, reducing the number of both Councillors and electoral wards, resulting in the first 'all out' election since 2002 Preston Council election.

All locally registered electors (British, Irish, Commonwealth and European Union citizens) who are aged 18 or over on polling day are entitled to vote in the local elections.

== Council composition ==
Prior to the election the composition of the council is:

- Labour Party: 30
- Liberal Democrats: 9
- Conservative Party: 8
- Vacant: 1

== Results summary ==
2021 Preston City Council election
| Party | This election | | | Full council | | | This election | | |
| Party | Seats | Net | Seats % | Other | Total | Total % | Votes | Votes % | +/− |
|---|---|---|---|---|---|---|---|---|---|
| Labour | 10 | Steady | 62.5 | 20 | 30 | 62.5 | 12,912 | 42.5 | -5.1 |
| Conservative | 5 | ▲2 | 31.3 | 6 | 11 | 22.9 | 10,529 | 34.6 | +7.0 |
| Liberal Democrats | 1 | ▼2 | 6.3 | 6 | 7 | 14.6 | 4,290 | 14.1 | -5.9 |
| Independent | 0 | Steady | 0.0 | 0 | 0 | 0.0 | 1,372 | 4.5 | +2.5 |
| Green | 0 | Steady | 0.0 | 0 | 0 | 0.0 | 1,207 | 4.0 | +3.5 |
| Reform UK | 0 | Steady | 0.0 | 0 | 0 | 0.0 | 51 | 0.2 | New |
| Heritage | 0 | Steady | 0.0 | 0 | 0 | 0.0 | 45 | 0.1 | New |

== Ward results ==
=== Ashton ===
2021 Preston City Council election: Ashton
| Party | Candidate | Votes | % | ±% |
|---|---|---|---|---|
| Labour | James Hull | 851 | 37.84 | −4.34 |
| Independent | Michael Balshaw | 726 | 32.28 | +2.89 |
| Conservative | Tes Slater | 433 | 19.25 | +5.93 |
| Green | Anne-Marie Walsh | 150 | 6.67 | N/A |
| Liberal Democrats | Jeremy Dable | 89 | 3.96 | −6.79 |
| Turnout | | | | |
| Labour hold | | Swing | | |

=== Brookfield ===
2021 Preston City Council election: Brookfield
| Party | Candidate | Votes | % | ±% |
|---|---|---|---|---|
| Labour | Nerys Eaves | 774 | 60.23 | +10.05 |
| Conservative | Bowan Perryman | 439 | 34.16 | +18.70 |
| Liberal Democrats | Andrew Stevenson | 72 | 5.60 | −5.76 |
| Turnout | | | | |
| Labour hold | | Swing | | |

=== Cadley ===
2021 Preston City Council election
| Party | Candidate | Votes | % | ±% |
|---|---|---|---|---|
| Liberal Democrats | Debbie Shannon | 846 | 38.19 | −13.51 |
| Conservative | Steve Whittam | 717 | 32.37 | +12.16 |
| Labour | Jono Grisdale | 561 | 25.33 | +2.14 |
| Green | Daniel Burt | 91 | 4.11 | N/A |
| Turnout | | | | |
| Liberal Democrats hold | | Swing | | |

=== City Centre ===
2021 Preston City Council election
| Party | Candidate | Votes | % | ±% |
|---|---|---|---|---|
| Labour | Salim Desai | 1,013 | 57.99 | −9.96 |
| Conservative | Andy Pratt | 387 | 22.15 | +8.29 |
| Green | David Nicholson | 173 | 9.90 | N/A |
| Liberal Democrats | Fiona Duke | 129 | 7.38 | −6.01 |
| Heritage | James Elliot | 45 | 2.58 | N/A |
| Turnout | | | | |
| Labour hold | | Swing | | |

=== Deepdale ===
2021 Preston City Council election
| Party | Candidate | Votes | % | ±% |
|---|---|---|---|---|
| Labour | Siraz Natha | 1,522 | 82.36 | −0.25 |
| Conservative | Nilli Williamson | 194 | 10.50 | +3.41 |
| Green | Kevin Rigotti | 96 | 5.19 | N/A |
| Liberal Democrats | Jurgen Voges | 36 | 1.95 | −4.95 |
| Turnout | | | | |
| Labour hold | | Swing | | |

=== Fishwick and Frenchwood ===
2021 Preston City Council election: Fishwick and Frenchwood
| Party | Candidate | Votes | % | ±% |
|---|---|---|---|---|
| Labour Co-op | Martyn Rawlinson | 1,299 | 79.64 | +10.44 |
| Conservative | Frankie Kennedy | 232 | 14.22 | +2.16 |
| Liberal Democrats | Rebecca Potter | 100 | 6.13 | −2.69 |
| Turnout | | | | |
| Labour hold | | Swing | | |

=== Garrison ===
2021 Preston City Council election: Garrison
| Party | Candidate | Votes | % | ±% |
|---|---|---|---|---|
| Labour | Peter Kelly | 1,212 | 51.25 | +7.05 |
| Conservative | Lakwinder Singh | 907 | 38.35 | +2.62 |
| Liberal Democrats | Michael Turner | 246 | 10.40 | −2.38 |
| Turnout | | | | |
| Labour hold | | Swing | | |

=== Greyfriars ===
2021 Preston City Council election: Greyfriars
| Party | Candidate | Votes | % | ±% |
|---|---|---|---|---|
| Conservative | Geoffery Aldridge | 1,089 | 40.99 | +11.97 |
| Liberal Democrats | Faiz Jethwa | 835 | 31.43 | −9.72 |
| Labour | Edward Smith | 573 | 21.57 | +2.82 |
| Green | Andy Burt | 160 | 6.02 | N/A |
| Turnout | | | | |
| Conservative gain from Liberal Democrats | | Swing | | |

=== Ingol and Cottam ===
2021 Preston City Council election: Ingol and Cottam
| Party | Candidate | Votes | % | ±% |
|---|---|---|---|---|
| Conservative | Trevor Hart | 961 | 44.39 | +12.40 |
| Liberal Democrats | Mark Jewell | 789 | 36.44 | −2.35 |
| Labour | Julie Humphrey | 415 | 19.17 | +2.23 |
| Turnout | | | | |
| Conservative gain from Liberal Democrats | | Swing | | |

=== Lea and Larches ===
2021 Preston City Council election: Lea and Larches
| Party | Candidate | Votes | % | ±% |
|---|---|---|---|---|
| Labour | Jennifer Mein | 682 | 38.75 | −3.01 |
| Conservative | Monwara Amin | 445 | 25.28 | +5.38 |
| Independent | Beth Balshaw | 366 | 20.80 | N/A |
| Liberal Democrats | Edward Craven | 168 | 9.55 | −7.67 |
| Independent | Luke Parkinson | 99 | 5.63 | N/A |
| Turnout | | | | |
| Labour hold | | Swing | | |

=== Plungington ===
2021 Preston City Council election: Plungington
| Party | Candidate | Votes | % | ±% |
|---|---|---|---|---|
| Labour | Nweeda Khan | 887 | 63.13 | +1.37 |
| Conservative | Pamela Homer | 316 | 22.49 | +7.39 |
| Green | Catherine Bissell | 120 | 8.54 | N/A |
| Liberal Democrats | Taylor Donoughue-Smith | 82 | 5.84 | −7.38 |
| Turnout | | | | |
| Labour hold | | Swing | | |

=== Preston Rural East ===
2021 Preston City Council election: Preston Rural East
| Party | Candidate | Votes | % | ±% |
|---|---|---|---|---|
| Conservative | Graham Jolliffe | 1,524 | 65.07 | +13.50 |
| Labour | Andrew MacLaren | 469 | 20.03 | +4.59 |
| Liberal Democrats | Peter Lawrence | 158 | 6.75 | −5.59 |
| Green | Heidi Physick | 191 | 8.16 | N/A |
| Turnout | | | | |
| Conservative hold | | Swing | | |

=== Preston Rural North ===
2021 Preston City Council election: Preston Rural North
| Party | Candidate | Votes | % | ±% |
|---|---|---|---|---|
| Conservative | Keith Middlebrough | 1,244 | 66.14 | +10.27 |
| Labour | Connor Dwyer | 419 | 22.28 | +7.62 |
| Liberal Democrats | Daniel Guise | 218 | 11.59 | −3.67 |
| Turnout | | | | |
| Conservative hold | | Swing | | |

=== Ribbleton ===
2021 Preston City Council election: Ribbleton
| Party | Candidate | Votes | % | ±% |
|---|---|---|---|---|
| Labour Co-op | Anna Hindle | 660 | 57.24 | +16.96 |
| Conservative | Mary Kudi | 231 | 20.03 | +10.24 |
| Independent | Mark Cotterill | 181 | 15.70 | N/A |
| Green | Sonia Phillips | 42 | 3.64 | N/A |
| Liberal Democrats | Luke Bosman | 39 | 3.38 | −7.37 |
| Turnout | | | | |
| Labour hold | | Swing | | |

=== Sharoe Green ===
2021 Preston City Council election: Sharoe Green
| Party | Candidate | Votes | % | ±% |
|---|---|---|---|---|
| Conservative | David Walker | 1,193 | 49.18 | +8.24 |
| Labour | Samir Vohra | 613 | 25.27 | −4.50 |
| Liberal Democrats | George Kulbacki | 385 | 15.87 | +3.63 |
| Green | Helen Disley | 184 | 7.58 | −10.03 |
| Reform UK | John Wilson | 51 | 2.10 | N/A |
| Turnout | | | | |
| Conservative hold | | Swing | | |

=== St. Matthew's ===
2021 Preston City Council election: St. Matthew's
| Party | Candidate | Votes | % | ±% |
|---|---|---|---|---|
| Labour | Suleman Sarwar | 962 | 75.33 | +2.13 |
| Conservative | Colin Homer | 217 | 16.99 | +2.56 |
| Liberal Democrats | Thomas Hackett | 98 | 7.67 | −1.41 |
| Turnout | | | | |
| Labour hold | | Swing | | |
