= 1998 Preston Borough Council election =

1998 UK local government election

Elections to Preston Borough Council were held on 7 May 1998. One third of the council was up for election and the Labour Party kept overall control of the council.

After the election, the composition of the council was:

Party	Seats	±
Labour	30	+2
Liberal Democrat	13	+1
Conservative	13	0
Independent	1	+1

== Election results ==
Preston local election result 1998
Party	Seats	Gains	Losses	Net gain/loss	Seats %	Votes %	Votes	+/−
Labour	8			-2	42.11			
Liberal Democrats	5			+1	26.32			
Conservative	5			0	26.32			
Independent	1			+1	5.36			

== Ward results ==
=== Ashton ===
Preston City Council Elections: Ashton Ward
Party	Candidate	Votes	%	±%
Conservative	R Ball	1,104	62.80	
Labour	G Greenidge	540	30.72	
Liberal Democrats	Joe Fitzgerald	114	6.48	

=== Avenham ===
Preston City Council Elections: Avenham Ward
Party	Candidate	Votes	%	±%
Labour	Ron Atkins	826	68.83	
Conservative	L Hammond	199	16.58	
Liberal Democrats	R Zimmy	175	14.58	

=== Brookfield ===
Preston City Council Elections: Brookfield Ward
Party	Candidate	Votes	%	±%
Labour	R Atkinson	544	62.96	
Conservative	R Edmondson	212	24.54	
Liberal Democrats	J Abram	108	12.50	

=== Cadley ===
Preston City Council Elections: Cadley Ward
Party	Candidate	Votes	%	±%
Liberal Democrats	Alan Hackett	1,358	67.73	
Conservative	P Balshaw	535	26.68	
Labour	P Malliband	112	5.59	

=== Central ===
Preston City Council Elections: Central Ward
Party	Candidate	Votes	%	±%
Labour	G Walmsley	769	66.93	
Conservative	D Barber	195	16.97	
Liberal Democrats	M Middleton	185	16.10	

=== Deepdale ===
Preston City Council Elections: Deepdale Ward
Party	Candidate	Votes	%	±%
Labour	Terry Cartwright	1,007	53.88	
Independent	M Jiwa	398	21.29	
Liberal Democrats	U Zinga	289	15.46	
Conservative	Sheila Heys	175	9.36	

=== Fishwick ===
Preston City Council Elections: Fishwick Ward
Party	Candidate	Votes	%	±%
Labour	I Patel	517	58.95	
Conservative	D Hammond	202	23.03	
Liberal Democrats	Wilf Gavin	158	18.02	

=== Greyfriars ===
Preston City Council Elections: Greyfriars Ward
Party	Candidate	Votes	%	±%
Conservative	D Chaloner	1,307	59.17	
Liberal Democrats	C Hughes	784	35.49	
Labour	A Milne-Picken	118	5.34	

=== Ingol ===
Preston City Council Elections: Ingol Ward
Party	Candidate	Votes	%	±%
Liberal Democrats	Ron Marshall	897	68.68	
Labour	C Abbot	251	19.22	
Conservative	P Randles	158	12.10	

=== Larches ===
Preston City Council Elections: Larches Ward
Party	Candidate	Votes	%	±%
Liberal Democrats	J Willacy	666	53.19	
Labour	J Swindells	461	36.82	
Conservative	P Halshaw	125	9.98	

=== Moor Park ===
Preston City Council Elections: Moor Park Ward
Party	Candidate	Votes	%	±%
Liberal Democrats	Mick Moulding	725	43.28	
Labour	G di Cioccio	638	38.09	
Conservative	K Sedgewick	312	18.63	

=== Preston Rural East ===
Preston City Council Elections: Rural East Ward
Party	Candidate	Votes	%	±%
Conservative	K Hudson	1,206	77.96	
Labour	J Houghton	175	11.31	
Liberal Democrats	E Rowland	166	10.73	

=== Preston Rural West ===
Preston City Council Elections: Rural West Ward
Party	Candidate	Votes	%	±%
Liberal Democrats	R Nash	1,033	46.91	
Conservative	Neil Cartwright	938	42.60	
Labour	M Clegg	231	10.49	

=== Ribbleton ===
Preston City Council Elections: Ribbleton Ward
Party	Candidate	Votes	%	±%
Labour	P Woods	512	65.47	
Conservative	Jane Balshaw	147	18.80	
Liberal Democrats	A Riedel	123	15.73	

=== Riversway ===
Preston City Council Elections: Riversway Ward
Party	Candidate	Votes	%	±%
Labour	Elaine Abbot	717	61.60	
Conservative	S Brown	240	20.62	
Liberal Democrats	Alan Valentine	207	17.78	

=== Sharoe Green ===
Preston City Council Elections: Sharoe Green Ward
Party	Candidate	Votes	%	±%
Conservative	E Clarkson	1,039	55.21	
Liberal Democrats	M Turner	661	35.12	
Labour	A McLaren	182	9.67	

=== Sherwood ===
Preston City Council Elections: Sherwood Ward
Party	Candidate	Votes	%	±%
Conservative	J Greenhalgh	1,232	63.57	
Labour	T Mattinson	379	19.57	
Labour	M Maritan	327	16.87	

=== St Matthews ===
Preston City Council Elections: St Matthews Ward
Party	Candidate	Votes	%	±%
Labour	Albert Richardson	766	70.15	
Conservative	P Pugh	188	17.22	
Liberal Democrats	M Cooper	138	12.64	

=== Tulketh ===
Preston City Council Elections: Tulketh Ward
Party	Candidate	Votes	%	±%
Labour	S Wilkinson	669	52.10	
Conservative	S Halshaw	419	32.63	
Liberal Democrats	N Sumner	196	15.26	
