= 2006 Preston City Council election =

2006 UK local government election

Map of the results of the 2006 Preston council election. Labour in red, Conservatives in blue and Liberal Democrats in yellow. Wards in grey were not contested in 2006.

The 2006 City Council elections for the City of Preston, Lancashire were held on 4 May 2006 on the same day as other 2006 United Kingdom local elections. Nineteen electoral wards were fought. The only change was that Labour gained one seat from the Liberal Democrats, continuing to be the largest party, but the Council remained under no overall control

== Candidates ==
The number of candidates fielded, by party, were:

- Labour – 19
- Conservative – 19
- Liberal Democrats – 18
- BNP – 1
- Respect Party – 5
- Green Party – 3

== Results ==
Preston local election result 2006
Party	Seats	Gains	Losses	Net gain/loss	Seats %	Votes %	Votes	+/−
Labour	9	1	0	+1	55.6	27.6	7,667	+2.02
Conservative	5	0	0	0	27.8	38.0	10,552	-0.75
Liberal Democrats	4	0	-1	-1	16.7	26.2	7,277	+0.2
Respect	0	0	0	0	0.0	6.1	1,692	-0.3
Green	0	0	0	0	0.0	1.1	313	+1.1
BNP	0	0	0	0	0.0	1.0	280	+1.0

== New composition ==
As of May 2006, Labour have 24 councillors, Conservative 17, LibDems 12, Respect 2 and there are two Independent councillors. Preston City Council remains under no overall control.

== Ward results ==
Preston Council is elected in thirds, which means there is an all out election in one year followed by single-member elections in all three-member wards and selected two-member wards. All changes in percentage share of the vote are from the corresponding 2003 or 2004 elections in the respective wards. Any "gain" or "loss" compares this year's elections with the 2002 "all out" vote because the councilors in this election are defending that year's result.

== Brookfield ==
In the north east of the city, the predominantly low income housing of Brookfield is a three-member ward. Buttressed up against Ribbleton and the rural east, and wedge-shaped to the south of Fulwood, the ward has been troubled by increasing levels of crime in recent years. Parts of the ward were formerly within the Fulwood district council and maintain the look of the affluent northern quarters of the city.

Preston City Council Elections: Brookfield ward 2006
Party	Candidate	Votes	%	±%
Labour	John Browne	588	45.79	+4.69
Conservative	David Johnston	458	35.67	+7.97
Liberal Democrats	Hilda Parkinson	238	18.54	+5.84
Majority		130		
Turnout		1,284		

== Cadley ==
The central ward of Cadley is positioned between Fulwood and Preston, with the main Lytham Road and Cadley Causeway used as the boundary between it and the nearby College and Ashton wards. Cadley is almost entirely suburban housing with a heavy commuter population.

Preston City Council Elections: Cadley ward 2006
Party	Candidate	Votes	%	±%
Liberal Democrats	Alan Hackett	1,039	58.57	+6.47
Conservative	Mary Driver	586	33.03	−3.27
Labour	Cuthbert Williams	149	8.40	−3.20
Majority		453		
Turnout		1,774		

== College ==
Created in the last round of local boundary reviews, the two-member College ward centres on two Fulwood employers. Preston College has a catchment area far beyond the city itself, whilst the recently closed Sharoe Green hospital has had many of its services re-directed to the Royal Preston Hospital. There are a mix of commuter and student housing and an increasing Muslim population.

The last election for a councillor in College ward was in 2003; the change of vote in this table is based on the 2003 figures.

Preston City Council Elections: College ward 2006
Party	Candidate	Votes	%	±%
Conservative	Kathleen Cartwright	690	56.70	+1.5
Liberal Democrats	Michael Turner	320	26.29	−4.5
Labour	Terence Mattinson	207	17.01	+3.0
Majority		370		
Turnout		1,217		

== Fishwick ==
Fishwick is a ward in the southwest of the city, at the border with South Ribble, spreading north into Ribbleton. The ward has a sizable percentage of comfortable housing but has in recent years been more infamous for the troubled Callon housing estate. The ward has higher than average unemployment and continuing issues with crime and drugs. In the 2004 elections, for the first time since local government restructuring in the 1970s, Fishwick elected a Conservative candidate to Town Hall. This accounts for the large changes in vote in this results table.

Preston City Council Elections: Fishwick ward 2006
Party	Candidate	Votes	%	±%
Labour	Harold Parker	483	42.44	+7.54
Conservative	Samir Vohra	229	20.12	−17.78
Liberal Democrats	Paul Valentine	216	18.98	N/A
Respect	Valli Urmarji	210	18.45	−8.65
Majority		254		
Turnout		1,138		

Councillor Harold Parker resigned due to health issues in August 2009 triggering a by-election on 1 October which was won by the Labour Party's Jennifer Mein.

Preston City Council By-elections: Fishwick ward 2009
Party	Candidate	Votes	%	±%
Labour	Jennifer Mein	656	55.69	+13.25
Conservative	Sharon Riley	283	24.02	+3.90
Liberal Democrats	Luke Bosman	239	20.29	+1.31
Majority		373		
Turnout		1,178	30.97	+40

== Garrison ==
Centred on Fulwood Barracks, this is a three-member ward created by the last round of boundary reviews. It is set in a heavily small "c" conservative part of Preston with a number of schools and small employment centres. In April 2006 Marie Milne changed party from Conservative to Liberal Democrat.

Preston City Council Elections: Garrison ward 2006
Party	Candidate	Votes	%	±%
Conservative	Jennifer Greenhalgh	1,019	60.65	+7.15
Liberal Democrats	Bill Parkinson	400	23.81	−1.39
Labour	William Burke	261	15.54	−5.76
Majority		619		
Turnout		1,680		

== Greyfriars ==
Its name coming from a large private estate within its boundaries, Greyfriars is one of the oldest names connected to Preston's history. It includes the Pius X Preparatory school and Fulwood's leisure centre. An increasing number of comfortable suburban houses has been built on the fringes of the ward, which also borders Ingol Golf Course.

Preston City Council Elections: Greyfriars ward 2006
Party	Candidate	Votes	%	±%
Conservative	David Hammond	1,619	68.11	+5.5
Liberal Democrats	John Porter	539	22.68	−3.2
Labour	Alan Woods	219	9.21	−1.9
Majority		1,080		
Turnout		2,377		

== Ingol ==
Ingol ward is in the north west of the city, bordered by Greyfriars and to the south of the M55 motorway. The ward contains two main population areas, Ingol and Tanterton. The latter has had problems with drugs and crime over recent years but this is beginning to improve. Parts of the ward are comfortable with some commuter areas and houses neighbouring the Lancaster canal. There are still pockets of troubled communities.

Ingol is a three-member ward. Two councillors were elected in 2003 following the expulsion from Town Hall of a Liberal Democrat councillor.

Preston City Council Elections: Ingol ward 2006
Party	Candidate	Votes	%	±%
Liberal Democrats	William Shannon	853	55.14	+7.74
Conservative	Marie Dilworth	396	25.60	−5.00
Labour	Phillip Crowe	298	19.26	−2.44
Majority		457		
Turnout		1,547		

== Larches ==
In the west of the city, around 30 minutes from the city centre, Larches is a box-shaped ward from the Riversway dual-carriageway into Blackpool to Haslam Park. It contains two post-war housing estates, Larches and Savick, and an area of suburban sprawl moved in from Ashton following boundary changes. The ward contains the whole of Ashton Park.

Preston City Council Elections: Larches ward 2006
Party	Candidate	Votes	%	±%
Liberal Democrats	Mark Jewell	957	52.64	+11.5
Labour	Allan Foster	569	31.30	−3.6
Conservative	Christine Sharp	292	16.06	−7.9
Majority		388		
Turnout		1,818		

== Lea ==
The three member ward of Lea contains the small Fylde border town of Lea Town, the urban Lea community and the sprawling green-belt community of Cottam. The ward mirrors the parish council boundary of Lea and Cottam Parish Council. Cottam has grown from a small farming community to a large private housing development populated by young families and business people.

Preston City Council Elections: Lea ward 2006
Party	Candidate	Votes	%	±%
Liberal Democrats	Christine Abram	776	48.14	−4.9
Conservative	Julie Buttle	678	42.06	+9.1
Labour	Andrew Gale	158	9.80	−4.1
Majority		98		
Turnout		1,612		

== Moor Park ==
Based on the Plungington community and bordering both the neat suburban terraces of southern Fulwood and the University of Central Lancashire campus, the Moor Park ward has a high number of student housing in converted Victorian housing and neater family houses. The Plungington area is split between this ward and neighbouring Tulketh. Moor Park itself is included in this ward, in the shadow of Deepdale football stadium.

Preston City Council Elections: Moor Park ward 2006
Party	Candidate	Votes	%	±%
Labour	John Collins	497	52.59	−18.84
Conservative	Hussain Mulla	233	24.66	−3.91
Liberal Democrats	Lydia Livingston	215	22.75	N/A
Majority		264		
Turnout		945		

== Preston Rural North ==
Over reaching across the city of Preston is the large Preston Rural North ward, which includes the M6 and M55 motorways and acres of market towns, farming communities and rural areas. The boroughs of Fylde and Wyre border this northern ward, which is a three-member ward.

In 2003, there was no election in this ward as the sitting councillor was unopposed.

Preston City Council Elections: Preston Rural North ward 2006
Party	Candidate	Votes	%	±%
Conservative	Kenneth Hudson	1,642	74.77	−0.5
Liberal Democrats	Ann Green	234	10.66	−4.6
Green	Margaret Ashworth	169	7.70	N/A
Labour	Pauline Jackson	151	6.88	−2.5
Majority		1,408		
Turnout		2,196		

== Ribbleton ==
Ribbleton, in the east of the city, grew massively in population as council housing was built around former mill worker terraces; now the ward is one of the largest in population and shows all the usual issues of high level crime and deprivation. Ribbleton, in common with the neighbouring Brookfield ward, is overwhelmingly white working class.

Preston City Council Elections: Ribbleton ward 2006
Party	Candidate	Votes	%	±%
Labour	Patricia Woods	623	53.71	−5.6
Conservative	Christine Thomas	304	26.21	+3.7
Liberal Democrats	Robert Nash	233	20.09	+1.9
Majority		319		
Turnout		1,160		

== Riversway ==
The Riversway ward has three distinct elements. Broadgate, a comfortable estate of Victorian housing with a high percentage of student housing; new build housing on the former British Aerospace site; and the redeveloped marina. The former Preston Port, one of the largest in its time, has been redeveloped to feature shopping units and new build housing of some considerable expense. The Preston Docks and surrounding area has a sizable area of Development including new Supermarkets, Car dealers and trade outlets.

A Hindu temple, Lancashire County Council's headquarters and Preston's railway station are in the Riversway ward.

Preston City Council Elections: Riversway ward 2006
Party	Candidate	Votes	%	±%
Labour	Linda Crompton	501	40.53	+5.7
Respect	Elaine Abbot	318	25.73	+1.7
Liberal Democrats	Wilf Gavin	221	17.88	−4.9
Conservative	Jane Balshaw	196	15.86	−2.5
Majority		183		
Turnout		1,236		
Labour gain from Liberal Democrats		Swing		

== Sharoe Green ==
Lodged in the south-central area of Fulwood, the Sharoe Green ward is based on the former hospital and surrounding commuter belt environs.

Preston City Council Elections: Sharoe Green ward 2006
Party	Candidate	Votes	%	±%
Conservative	Margaret McManus	1,054	57.16	+4.6
Liberal Democrats	Stephen Wilkinson	510	27.66	+0.7
Labour	Paul Jackson	280	15.18	−5.2
Majority		544		
Turnout		1,844		

== St George's ==
The St George's ward is a rectangle-shaped ward in between Deepdale and the city centre. The largest area of population are rows of old-style terraces with streets named after various saints – David, Barnabus, Anne, Martin, Michael and George to name a few. The ward has one of the largest percentage of Hindu and Muslim population in the city and has an increasing student population.

Preston City Council Elections: St George's ward 2006
Party	Candidate	Votes	%	±%
Labour	Abu Taalib Shamsuddin	344	38.74	−6.4
Respect	Sumera Mir Rizwan	225	25.34	−2.0
Liberal Democrats	Tracy Singleton	142	15.99	N/A
Conservative	Susan Brown	115	12.95	−14.6
Green	Matthew Beck	62	6.98	N/A
Majority		119		
Turnout		888		

== St Matthew's ==
A wedge-shaped ward in between the streets of Ribbleton and the city centre, this ward contains some deprived housing in the process of renewal, and in the recent months expensive new-build conversions.

Preston City Council Elections: St Matthew's ward 2006
Party	Candidate	Votes	%	±%
Labour	Albert Richardson	747	58.77	+13.6
Respect	Danielle Field	292	23.29	−10.5
Conservative	Peter McElhone	225	17.94	−3.0
Majority		445		
Turnout		1,254		

== Town Centre ==
Formed by boundary changes prior to Preston being awarded city status, Town Centre is the largest non-rural ward in the borough. There are three distinct parts to this central seat, namely Avenham, Frenchwood and the city centre itself.

The ward includes student developments and converted student homes in Avenham; expensive new build developments around the historic Winckley Square; and the Frenchwood area on the banks of the River Ribble. Avenham was notorious for high levels of crime and deprivation, but this is turning around with the establishment of community groups and private housing associations funding renewal. There is a sizable Muslim population in Avenham and Frenchwood.

Preston City Council Elections: Town Centre Ward 2006
Party	Candidate	Votes	%	±%
Labour	Ronald Atkins	654	37.59	−2.3
Respect	Mukhtar Master	647	37.18	+3.6
Conservative	Ronald Smith	235	13.51	+2.0
Liberal Democrats	Liam Pennington	122	7.01	−6.8
Green	Robert Douglas	82	4.71	N/A
Majority		7		
Turnout		1,740		

== Tulketh ==
Tulketh ward is a central and entirely urban ward north of the university complex, and to the east of Ashton. Its main population areas are traditional terrace housing, which mixes families with small shops including the Lane Ends shopping village and student housing.

Preston City Council Elections: Tulketh ward 2006
Party	Candidate	Votes	%	±%
Labour	Jean Al-Serraj	652	41.14	−10.2
Conservative	John Wilson	480	30.28	−18.4
BNP	Anthony Bamber	280	17.67	N/A
Liberal Democrats	Helen Greaves	173	10.91	N/A
Majority		172		
Turnout		1,585		

Cllr Al-Serraj died in 2007. The resulting by-election was held the following year, resulting in a hold for the defending Labour Party.

Tulketh by-election 14 February 2008
Party	Candidate	Votes	%	±%
Labour	Peter Rankin	423	34.3	−6.8
Liberal Democrats	Rick Seymour	400	32.4	+21.5
Conservative	Paul Balshaw	292	23.6	−6.7
No Label	Barry Hill	84	6.8	N/A
Green	Kizzi Murtagh	36	2.9	N/A
Majority		23	1.9	
Turnout		1,235		
Labour hold		Swing	-14.2	

== University ==
Shaped around the outskirts of the city centre, this butterfly-wing shaped ward was formed following the recent boundary changes. It took from the oversized Riversway ward electors from the St Pauls and Maudland areas as well as the university campus itself. It is a two-member ward.

The last election for University ward was held in 2003. The changes in vote are from the election in this year.

Preston City Council Elections: University ward 2006
Party	Candidate	Votes	%	±%
Labour	Carl Crompton	295	60.82	+1.8
Conservative	Paul Balshaw	101	20.82	−20.2
Liberal Democrats	Jenny Buxton	89	18.35	N/A
Majority		194		
Turnout		485		

== See also ==
- Preston local elections
- City of Preston, Lancashire
- Fulwood, Lancashire
- Preston (UK Parliament constituency)
