= Patrick Hurley (British politician) =

British politician (born 1976)

Patrick Hurley MP
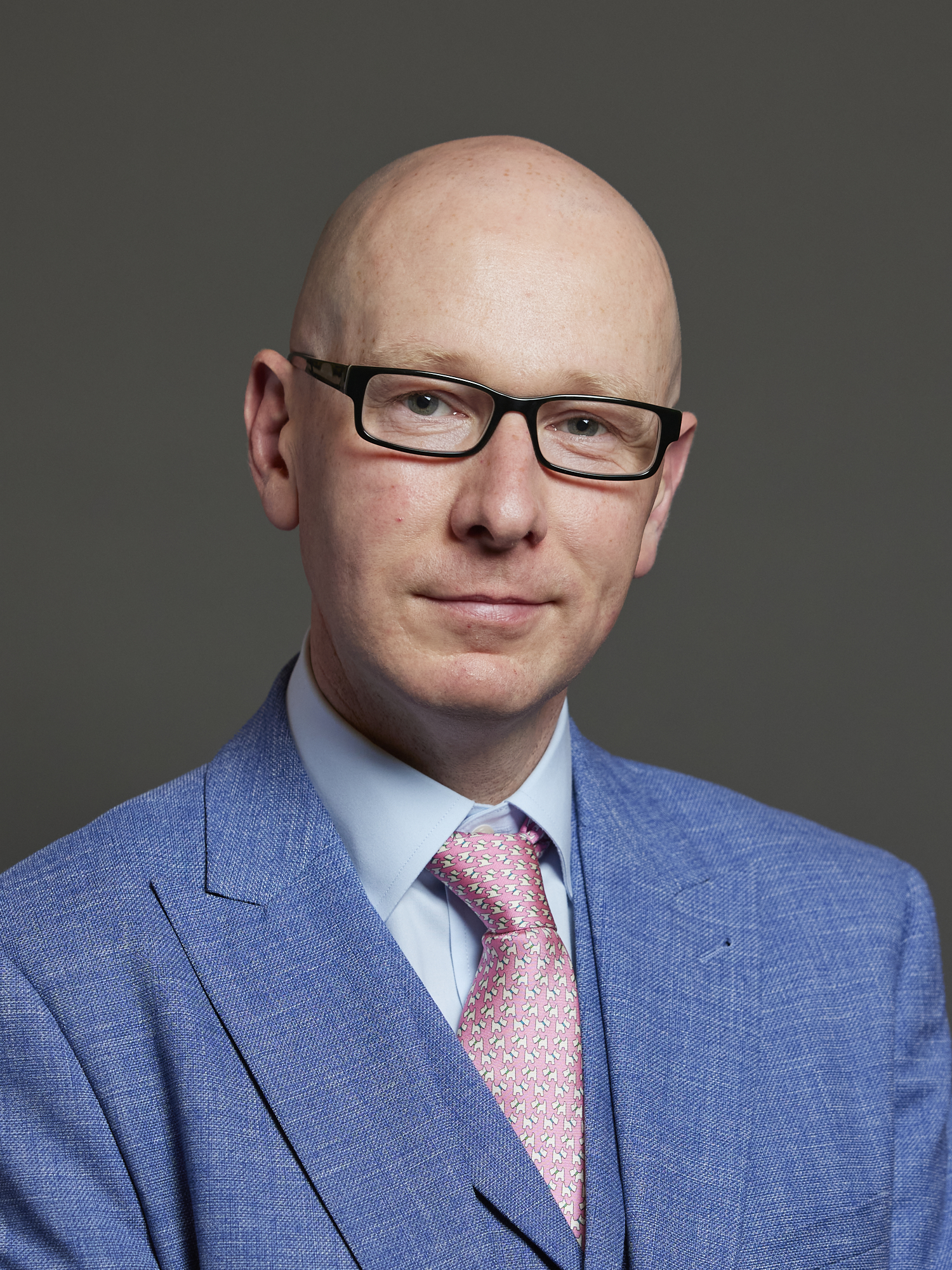
- Official portrait, 2024

Member of Parliament for Southport
- Incumbent
- Assumed office 4 July 2024
- Preceded by: Damien Moore
- Majority: 5,789 (12.9%)

Personal details
- Born: 25 August 1976 (age 50) Prescot, Merseyside, England
- Party: Labour
- Website: patrickhurley.uk

Patrick Brian Hurley (born 25 August 1976) is a British Labour Party politician who was elected the Member of Parliament (MP) for Southport at the 2024 general election.

Hurley is the first Labour MP for Southport, having served as a councillor for Mossley Hill on Liverpool City Council from 2011 to 2023.

Hurley is from Prescot, Knowsley. He previously stood for the newly-created Waterfront South ward in the council elections on 4 May 2023, but was not elected.

Hurley was elected Member of Parliament for Southport immediately before the 2024 Southport stabbing. Following riots in Southport on the night of 30 July 2024, Hurley appeared on BBC Radio 4's Today programme on the morning of 31 July 2024, where he said that the rioters were not local residents, but "were thugs who'd got the train in" and were "utterly disrespecting the families of the dead and injured children, and utterly disrespecting the town".

In October 2024, he launched what he described as a "whimsical" campaign to reduce the price of Freddo chocolate bars as a way to engage young people in politics and discussions about the cost of living crisis.

He is Chair of the Social, Cooperative and Community Economy All-Party Parliamentary Group (APPG).

Parliament of the United Kingdom
| Preceded by Damien Moore | Member of Parliament for Southport; 2024–present | Incumbent |
