= 2010 Preston City Council election =

2010 UK local government election

Map of the results of the 2010 Preston council election. Labour in red, Conservatives in blue, Liberal Democrats in yellow. Wards in grey were not contested in 2010.

Council elections for the City of Preston, Lancashire were held on 6 May 2010. They coincided with the 2010 United Kingdom general election and the other 2010 United Kingdom local elections. Nineteen electoral wards were fought with those councillors elected in the corresponding elections in 2006 defending their seats due to the "in thirds" system employed in Preston local elections.

The previous elections to Preston council occurred in 2008 but due to the "in thirds" system employed by Preston council, councillors are elected for four-year terms. This means gains, losses, and vote share comparisons this year are with those fought in 2006.

== Election result ==
Preston local election result 2010
Party	Seats	Gains	Losses	Net gain/loss	Seats %	Votes %	Votes	+/−
Labour	10	1	1	0	35.97	55	19,320	
Conservative	6	1	0	+1	33.69	30	18,096	
Liberal Democrats	3	1	2	-1	29.38	15	15,782	
England First	0	0	0	0	0.00		315	
Green	0	0	0	0	0.00		198	

== Ward results ==
Preston Council election, 2010: Brookfield
Party	Candidate	Votes	%	±%
Labour	John Browne	1,333	51.99	+6.20
Conservative	Sharon Riley	776	30.27	−5.40
Liberal Democrats	Michael Basford	455	17.75	−0.79
Majority		557		
Turnout			48.2	
Labour hold		Swing	+3.5	

Preston Council elections, 2010: Cadley
Party	Candidate	Votes	%	±%
Liberal Democrats	John Bruton	1,270	46.69	−11.88
Conservative	David Walker	901	33.13	+0.10
Labour	George Tait	549	20.18	+11.78
Majority				
Turnout		2,720	71.4	
Liberal Democrats hold		Swing		

Preston Council election, 2010: College
Party	Candidate	Votes	%	±%
Conservative	Bobby Cartwright	880	45.55	−11.15
Labour	Gerard Parke-Hutton	543	28.11	+11.10
Liberal Democrats	Mike Turner	509	26.35	+0.06
Green	Ian McCormick	63	3.26	N/A
Majority		337	17.44	
Turnout		1,932	70.6	
Conservative hold		Swing		

Preston Council election, 2010: Fishwick
Party	Candidate	Votes	%	±%
Labour	Tom Burns	1,167	60.78	+18.34
Liberal Democrats	Luke Bosman	406	21.15	+2.17
Conservative	Steve Allen	347	18.07	−2.05
Majority		761	39.64	
Turnout			51.2	
Labour hold		Swing		

Preston Council election, 2010: Garrison
Party	Candidate	Votes	%	±%
Conservative	Jennifer Greenhalgh	1,775	46.59	−14.06
Labour	Bert Williams	1,074	28.51	+12.97
Liberal Democrats	Thomas Hackett	918	24.37	+0.56
Majority		701	18.60	
Turnout		3,767	67.8	
Conservative hold		Swing		

Preston Council election, 2010: Greyfriars
Party	Candidate	Votes	%	±%
Conservative	David Hammond	2,156	54.35	−13.76
Liberal Democrats	John Porter	1,070	26.97	+4.29
Labour	Alan Woods	741	11.87	+2.66
Majority				
Turnout			75.3	
Conservative hold		Swing		

Preston Council election, 2010: Ingol
Party	Candidate	Votes	%	±%
Liberal Democrats	Bill Shannon	1,498	48.65	−6.49
Conservative	Rebecca Roberts	795	25.82	+0.22
Labour	Derek Barton	786	25.53	=6.27
Majority		703	22.83	
Turnout		3,079	55.3	
Liberal Democrats hold		Swing		

Preston Council election, 2010: Larches
Party	Candidate	Votes	%	±%
Labour	Phil Crowe	1,318	39.76	+8.46
Liberal Democrats	Mark Jewell	1,273	38.40	−14.24
Conservative	Laura Evans	724	21.84	+5.78
Majority				
Turnout		3,315	59.0	
Labour gain from Liberal Democrats		Swing		

Preston Council election, 2010: Lea
Party	Candidate	Votes	%	±%
Conservative	Christine Abram	1,333	42.26	+0.20
Liberal Democrats	Julie Voges	1,161	36.81	−11.33
Labour	Allan Foster	660	20.93	+11.13
Majority		172	5.45	
Turnout		3,154	66.5	
Conservative gain from Liberal Democrats		Swing		

Preston Council election, 2010: Moor Park
Party	Candidate	Votes	%	±%
Labour	John Collins	1,038	53.07	+0.48
Liberal Democrats	Kirsty Styles	492	25.15	+2.40
Conservative	Sheila Heys	426	21.78	−2.88
Majority		546		
Turnout		1,956	52.9	
Labour hold		Swing		

Preston Council election, 2010: Preston Rural North
Party	Candidate	Votes	%	±%
Conservative	Ken Hudson	2,749	68.69	−6.08
Liberal Democrats	Liz Richardson	773	19.32	+8.66
Labour	Ann Rawlinson	480	11.99	+5.11
Majority				
Turnout		4,002	73.9	
Conservative hold		Swing		

Preston Council election, 2010: Ribbleton
Party	Candidate	Votes	%	±%
Labour	Jonathan Saksena	1,209	48.07	−5.64
Conservative	Peter McElhone	519	20.64	−5.57
Liberal Democrats	William Richard Bruton	472	18.77	−1.32
England First	Mark Cotterill	315	12.52	N/A
Majority		690	27.44	
Turnout			44.1	
Labour hold		Swing		

Preston Council election, 2010: Riversway (2)
Party	Candidate	Votes	%	±%
Labour	Dave Wilson	1,140		
Liberal Democrats	Liam Pennington	807		
Labour Co-op	Linda Crompton	803		
Liberal Democrats	Stephen Wilkinson	709		
Conservative	Genna Martin	466		
Conservative	Hussain Mulla	407		
Majority				
Turnout			53.2	
Labour hold		Swing		
Liberal Democrats gain from Labour Co-op		Swing		

Riversway by-election 15 July 2010
Party	Candidate	Votes	%	±%
Labour	Linda Crompton	890	66.7	
Liberal Democrats	Stephen Wilkinson	388	29.1	
Green	Adam Vardey	56	4.2	
Majority		502	37.6	
Turnout		1,334	29	
Labour gain from Liberal Democrats		Swing		

Preston Council election, 2010: Sharoe Green
Party	Candidate	Votes	%	±%
Conservative	Margaret McManus	1,538	44.02	−13.14
Labour	John Young	917	26.25	+11.07
Liberal Democrats	Rowena Edmonson	904	25.87	−1.79
Green	Adam Vardey	135	3.87	N/A
Majority				
Turnout		3,494	68.8	
Conservative hold		Swing		

Preston Council election, 2010: St George's
Party	Candidate	Votes	%	±%
Labour	Taalib Shamsuddin	1,001	63.68	+24.94
Liberal Democrats	Rebecca Finch	362	23.03	+7.04
Conservative	Patricia Roberts	209	13.30	+0.35
Majority		639	40.65	
Turnout		1,572	49.1	
Labour hold		Swing		

Preston Council election, 2010: St Matthew's
Party	Candidate	Votes	%	±%
Labour	Albert Richardson	1,415	63.83	+5.06
Liberal Democrats	Jeffrey Abram	470	21.20	N/A
Conservative	Julian Sedgewick	332	14.98	−2.96
Majority		945		
Turnout		2,217	44.7	
Labour hold		Swing		

Preston Council election, 2010: Town Centre ward 2010
Party	Candidate	Votes	%	±%
Labour	Drew Gale	1,541	51.92	+14.33
Liberal Democrats	Jenny Buxton	904	30.46	+23.45
Conservative	Jonathan Cooper	523	17.62	+4.11
Majority		637		+630
Turnout		2,968	53.7	
Labour hold		Swing		

Preston Council election, 2010: Tulketh
Party	Candidate	Votes	%	±%
Labour	Peter Rankin	1,122	39.87	−1.27
Liberal Democrats	John Potter	1,070	38.02	+27.11
Conservative	Damien Moore	622	22.10	−8.18
Majority		52		
Turnout		2,814	54.2	
Labour hold		Swing		

Preston Council election, 2010: University
Party	Candidate	Votes	%	±%
Labour	Carl Crompton	483	48.59	−12.23
Liberal Democrats	Kieran Bolger	259	26.06	+7.71
Conservative	John Martyn Blenkharn	252	25.35	+4.53
Majority		224		
Turnout		994	41.7	
Labour hold		Swing		
