= Damien Moore =

British politician (born 1980)

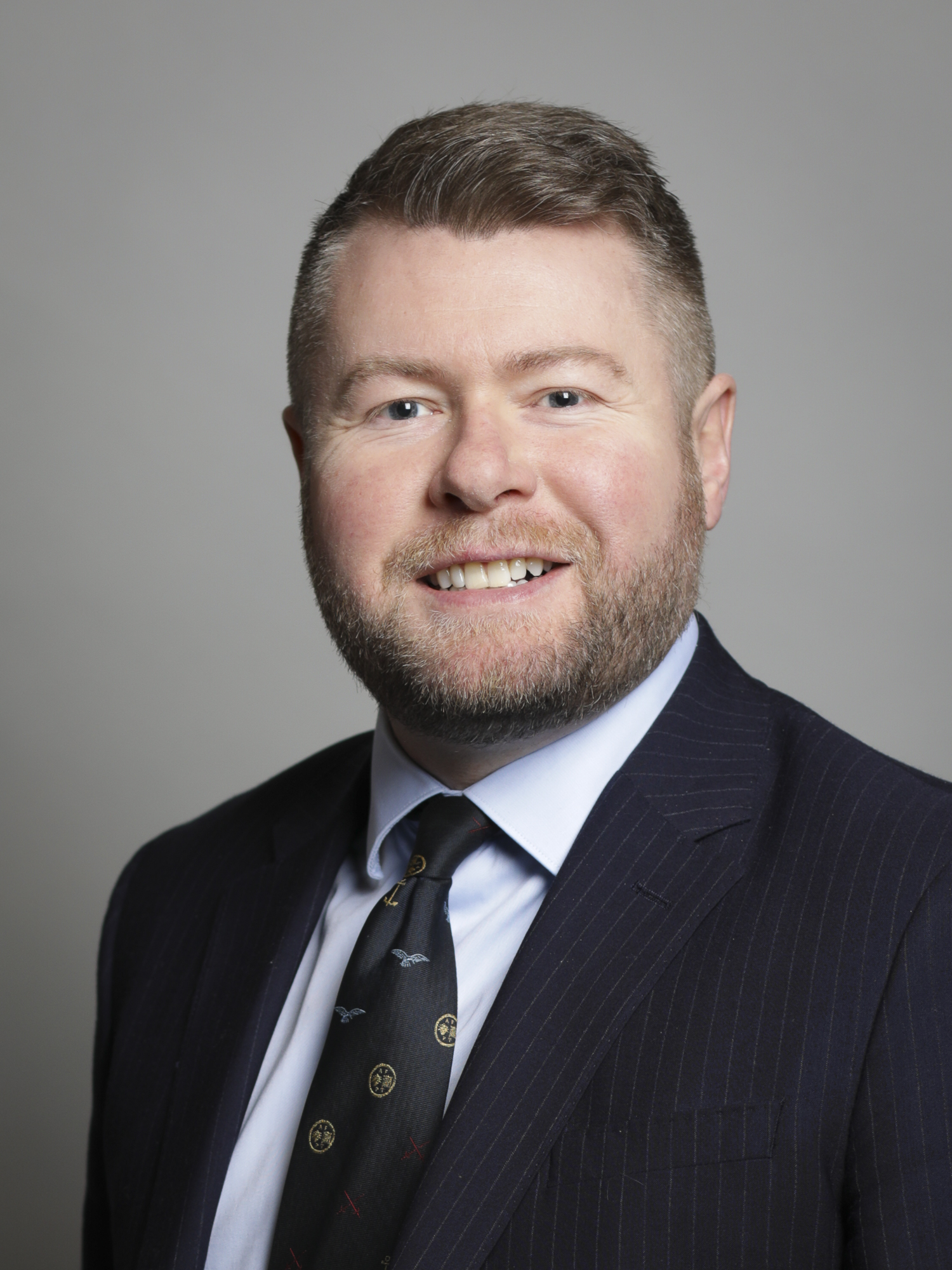
- Official portrait, 2019

Assistant Government Whip
- In office 20 September 2022 – 27 October 2022
- Prime Minister: Liz Truss

Member of Parliament for Southport
- In office 8 June 2017 – 30 May 2024
- Preceded by: John Pugh
- Succeeded by: Patrick Hurley

Personal details
- Born: 26 April 1980 (age 46) Workington, Cumbria, England
- Party: Reform UK (since 2026); Conservative (2010–2026)
- Education: University of Central Lancashire
- Website: www.damienmooremp.com

Damien Moore (born 26 April 1980) is a British Reform UK and former Conservative Party politician, who was Member of Parliament for Southport from 2017 to 2024. He served as Assistant Government Whip from September to October 2022.

== Early life and career ==
Damien Moore was born on 26 April 1980 in Workington, Cumbria. He studied history at the University of Central Lancashire. After graduating, he worked in various roles in the retail sector, gaining promotion to be a retail manager for Asda.

== Political career ==
=== Local government career ===
He was first elected as a councillor for the Conservative Party on Preston City Council in 2010 for the Greyfriars Ward. He was re-elected with an increased majority on 5 May 2016. He has served as deputy leader of the Conservative group on the Council and as Chairman of the Preston Conservative Association. He unsuccessfully stood as the Conservative candidate in the Preston West division in the Lancashire County Council elections in 2013 and 2017.

At the 2015 general election, Moore stood in Southport, coming second with 28% of the vote behind the incumbent Liberal Democrat MP John Pugh.

=== Parliamentary career ===
At the snap 2017 general election, Moore was elected to Parliament as MP for Southport with 38.7% of the vote and a majority of 2,914.

On 11 September 2017, Damien Moore was appointed to the Petitions Committee. The committee assists members of the public in raising issues directly. In January 2018 he was also appointed the Science and Technology Committee.

In advance of the 2018 Preston City Council election, Moore resigned as a city councillor to focus on his parliamentary work.

In December 2019, Moore was placed 611 of 650 MPs in the 2019 People-Power Index, a "health check" of how Parliament is working and how MPs are listening to and engaging with, their constituents.

Moore was re-elected as MP for Southport at the 2019 general election with an increased vote share of 47.6% and an increased majority of 4,147. His election campaign was viewed as contentious as Moore claimed he had secured £25 million from the New Towns Fund for Southport, when in fact the town actually had only the opportunity to bid for up to £25 million.

On 21 October 2020, Moore was the only MP from Merseyside to vote against extending the 80% furlough rate for people forced out of work in tier three lockdown areas, despite his own constituency and Merseyside being in tier three lockdown at the time.

Following Labour's motion calling to extend free school meals for the poorest children on 21 October 2020, Moore abstained and protestors sent a message of dissatisfaction by leaving paper plates with messages written on them outside Moore's office in Post Office Avenue, Southport.

In October 2020, a group of Conservative MPs in northern England launched a new campaign group, the Northern Research Group. The aim of the group was to pressure the government to stick to their post-election pledge of "levelling up" the north by spending money and increasing infrastructure projects in the area. Moore signed up to this group. However, in a letter sent to prime minister Boris Johnson from the Northern Research Group on 26 October 2020 in which 41 named MPs expressed fears that the government's "levelling up" was being abandoned, Moore's name was absent.

=== Defection to Reform UK and 2026 local elections ===
In 2026, Moore joined Reform UK, and announced he will stand as a candidate for the party in the 2026 Westminster City Council election.

== Post-parliamentary career ==
Following his defeat at the 2024 UK General Election, Moore worked as a senior adviser for public affairs consultancy Fullbrook Strategies.

== Personal life ==
Moore lives in Southport. He is openly gay.

Parliament of the United Kingdom
Preceded by John Pugh	Member of Parliament for Southport; 2017–2024	Succeeded by Patrick Hurley
