= 2000 Preston Borough Council election =

2000 UK local government election

Elections to Preston Borough Council were held on 7 May 2000. One third of the council was up for election and the council stayed under no overall control.

After the election, the composition of the council was:

Party	Seats	±
Labour	24	-4
Conservative	17	+4
Liberal Democrat	12	+1
Independent	4	-1

== Election results ==
Preston local election result 2000
Party	Seats	Gains	Losses	Net gain/loss	Seats %	Votes %	Votes	+/−
Conservative	7			+4	35.00	41.78	12,108	+11.68
Labour	7			-4	35.00	28.84	8,358	-8.75
Liberal Democrats	5			+1	25.00	25.57	7,411	-2.17
Independent	1			-1	5.00	3.80	1,101	-0.17

== Ward results ==
This election was the last to be held before a boundary review increased the number of electoral wards and redistributed the councillors.

=== Ashton ===
Preston City Council Elections: Ashton Ward
Party	Candidate	Votes	%	±%
Conservative	Keith Sedgewick	838	49.03	−10.14
Labour	Mark Routledge	669	39.15	+7.12
Independent	Stanley Baines	197	11.56	+11.56

=== Avenham ===
Preston City Council Elections: Avenham Ward
Party	Candidate	Votes	%	±%
Labour	Ken Cole	755	67.41	+1.57
Conservative	Anne Hammond	218	19.46	+2.71
Liberal Democrats	Anne-Marie Riedel	141	12.59	−4.57

=== Brookfield ===
Preston City Council Elections: Brookfield Ward
Party	Candidate	Votes	%	±%
Labour	John Browne	523	60.60	
Conservative	Paul Hammond	336	39.40	

=== Cadley ===
Preston City Council Elections: Cadley Ward
Party	Candidate	Votes	%	±%
Liberal Democrats	Bill Borrow	1,113	51.15	
Conservative	Stephen Bentham	949	43.61	
Labour	Michael Carruthers	111	5.10	

=== Central ===
Preston City Council Elections: Central Ward
Party	Candidate	Votes	%	±%
Labour	Siraz Ali Natha	590	67.97	
Conservative	Susan Brown	271	32.03	

=== Deepdale ===
Preston City Council Elections: Deepdale Ward
Party	Candidate	Votes	%	±%
Independent	Paul Malliband	778	48.44	
Labour	Derek Barton	507	31.57	
Conservative	Thomas Davies	320	19.93	

=== Fishwick ===
Preston City Council Elections: Fishwick Ward
Party	Candidate	Votes	%	±%
Labour	Harold Parker	612	65.38	
Conservative	David Hammond	320	34.62	

=== Greyfriars ===
Preston City Council Elections: Greyfriars Ward
Party	Candidate	Votes	%	±%
Conservative	Joseph Hood	1,594	69.00	
Liberal Democrats	Raymond Askew	623	26.97	
Labour	Angela Milne-Pickin	89	4.03	

=== Ingol ===
Preston City Council Elections: Ingol Ward (2 members)
Party	Candidate	Votes	%	±%
Liberal Democrats	William Chadwick	921	38.44	
Liberal Democrats	Margaret Marshall	838	34.97	
Conservative	Sheila Heys	238	9.93	
Conservative	Shaun Turner	199	8.31	
Labour	Julie Humphrey	175	7.30	
Independent	Bernadette Jones	25	1.04	

=== Larches ===
Preston City Council Elections: Larches Ward
Party	Candidate	Votes	%	±%
Liberal Democrats	Kathleen Derbyshire	665	57.68	
Labour	Allan Foster	285	24.72	
Conservative	David Sharp	128	11.10	
Independent	Lee Forshaw	72	6.24	

=== Moor Park ===
Preston City Council Elections: Moor Park Ward
Party	Candidate	Votes	%	±%
Labour	John Collins	729	43.16	
Liberal Democrats	Michael Turner	641	37.95	
Conservative	Paul Balshaw	306	18.12	

=== Rural East ===
Preston City Council Elections: Rural East Ward
Party	Candidate	Votes	%	±%
Conservative	Geoff Swarbrick	1,335	81.35	
Liberal Democrats	John Bruton	210	12.80	
Labour	Pauline Sanderson	91	5.55	

=== Rural West ===
Preston City Council Elections: Rural West Ward
Party	Candidate	Votes	%	±%
Conservative	Kathryn Calder	1,281	52.82	
Liberal Democrats	Michael Basford	951	39.22	
Labour	James Hull	189	7.79	

=== Ribbleton ===
Preston City Council Elections: Ribbleton Ward
Party	Candidate	Votes	%	±%
Labour	Andy Campbell	483	71.03	
Conservative	Jane Balshaw	193	28.97	

=== Riversway ===
Preston City Council Elections: Riversway Ward
Party	Candidate	Votes	%	±%
Liberal Democrats	Alan Valentine	648	43.52	
Labour	Irene Black	624	41.91	
Conservative	Jonathan MacKie	180	12.09	
Independent	Kristian Forshaw	29	1.95	

=== Sharoe Green ===
Preston City Council Elections: Sharoe Green Ward
Party	Candidate	Votes	%	±%
Conservative	Rowena Edmondson	1,155	68.75	
Liberal Democrats	Alistair Thomas	299	17.80	
Labour	Kevin Ellard	224	13.33	

=== Sherwood ===
Preston City Council Elections: Sherwood Ward
Party	Candidate	Votes	%	±%
Conservative	Stuart Greenhalgh	1,219	62.67	
Liberal Democrats	Margaret Maritan	361	18.56	
Labour	Terence Mattinson	360	18.56	

=== St Matthews ===
Preston City Council Elections: St Matthews Ward
Party	Candidate	Votes	%	±%
Labour	Veronica Afrin	624	68.87	
Conservative	Elaine Pugh	282	31.13	

=== Tulketh ===
Preston City Council Elections: Tulketh Ward
Party	Candidate	Votes	%	±%
Conservative	Margaret McManus	746	50.96	
Labour	Valerie Wise	718	49.04	
