= 2002 Preston Borough Council election =

2002 UK local government election

Map of the results of the 2002 Preston council election. Labour in red, Conservatives in blue, Liberal Democrats in yellow and independent in grey.

Elections were held for Preston Borough Council in North West England, in May 2002. Held prior to the town being awarded city status, these elections took place following a boundary review which introduced new electoral wards as a consequence of population increase. Therefore, all councillors were up for election in the new wards for the first time.

For other elections to Preston Town Hall, both as a Borough and City council, see Preston local elections.

== Ward results ==
=== Ashton ===
Preston City Council Elections: Ashton Ward (2 members)
Party	Candidate	Votes	%	±%
Conservative	Keith Sedgewick	579	27.56	
Conservative	William Tyson	558	26.56	
Labour	Stacy Borrow	395	18.80	
Labour	Andrew Maclaren	382	18.18	
Liberal Democrats	Mavis Cooper	187	8.90	

=== Brookfield ===
Preston City Council Elections: Brookfield Ward (3 members)
Party	Candidate	Votes	%	±%
Labour	John Browne	871	22.65	
Labour	Jonathan Saksena	804	20.90	
Labour	Nerys Eaves	728	18.93	
Conservative	Yvonne Driver	412	10.71	
Conservative	Jean Swarbrick	389	10.11	
Conservative	Susan Hudson	370	9.62	
Socialist Alliance	Paul Malliband	272	7.07	

=== Cadley ===
Preston City Council Elections: Cadley Ward (2 members)
Party	Candidate	Votes	%	±%
Liberal Democrats	Alan Hackett	1,070	28.42	
Liberal Democrats	Michael Onyon	880	23.37	
Conservative	Stephen Bentham	677	17.98	
Conservative	George Wilkins	559	14.85	
Labour	Mark O'Brien	279	7.41	

=== College ===
Preston City Council Elections: College Ward (2 members)
Party	Candidate	Votes	%	±%
Conservative	Kathleen Cartright	731	27.57	
Conservative	Jill Truby	680	25.65	
Liberal Democrats	Michael Turner	427	16.11	
Liberal Democrats	William Shannon	361	13.62	
Labour	George Tait	234	8.83	
Labour	Rosemary Tait	218	8.22	

=== Deepdale ===
Preston City Council Elections: Deepdale Ward (2 members)
Party	Candidate	Votes	%	±%
Independent	Terry Cartright	637	24.75	
Independent	Joyce Cartright	572	22.22	
Labour	Javed Iqbal	511	19.85	
Labour	Henry Heaps	384	14.92	
Liberal Democrats	Maksud Patel	202	7.85	
Conservative	John Docherty	149	5.79	
Conservative	Shaun Ryan	119	5.62	

=== Fishwick ===
Preston City Council Elections: Fishwick Ward (2 members)
Party	Candidate	Votes	%	±%
Labour	Harold Parker	534	35.13	
Labour	Ismail Patel	476	31.32	
Conservative	David Hammond	208	13.68	
Conservative	Simon Stammers	160	10.53	
Liberal Democrats	Mary Gardner	142	9.34	

=== Garrison ===
Preston City Council Elections: Garrison Ward (3 members)
Party	Candidate	Votes	%	±%
Conservative	Jennifer Greenhalgh	982	21.01	
Conservative	Stuart Greenhalgh	949	20.30	
Conservative	Marie Milne	940	20.11	
Labour	Peter Rankin	407	8.71	
Labour	Ben Aberra	389	8.32	
Labour	Thomas Leigh	370	7.91	
Liberal Democrats	Mavis Shannon	218	4.66	
Liberal Democrats	Kenneth Fitzer	216	4.62	
Liberal Democrats	James McAlea	204	4.36	

=== Greyfriars ===
Preston City Council Elections: Greyfriars Ward (3 members)
Party	Candidate	Votes	%	±%
Conservative	Joseph Hood	1,883	23.37	
Conservative	Geoff Driver	1,770	21.96	
Conservative	Peter Horton	1,701	21.11	
Liberal Democrats	Raymond Askew	932	11.56	
Liberal Democrats	John Porter	782	9.70	
Liberal Democrats	Alastair Thomas	733	9.10	
Labour	Alan Woods	258	3.20	

=== Ingol ===
Preston City Council Elections: Ingol Ward (3 members)
Party	Candidate	Votes	%	±%
Liberal Democrats	William Chadwick	970	22.11	
Liberal Democrats	Margaret Marshall	896	20.42	
Liberal Democrats	Ronald Marshall	889	20.26	
Labour	Steven Brooks	298	6.79	
Conservative	Marie Dilworth	284	6.47	
Conservative	Sheila Heys	278	6.34	
Labour	Thomas Burns	276	6.29	
Conservative	Mary Robinson	250	5.70	
Labour	Michael Farrington	247	5.63	

=== Larches ===
Preston City Council Elections: Larches Ward (3 members)
Party	Candidate	Votes	%	±%
Liberal Democrats	Kathleen Derbyshire	723	13.68	
Liberal Democrats	Daniel Gallagher	710	13.43	
Labour	Peter Ward	705	13.34	
Labour	Allan Foster	699	13.22	
Labour	Mark Routledge	643	12.16	
Liberal Democrats	David Bastable	570	10.78	
Conservative	Joe Fitzgerald	393	7.43	
Conservative	Alan Hunter	358	6.77	
Conservative	Elizabeth Heywood	341	6.45	
Independent	Colin Abbot	144	2.72	

=== Lea ===
Preston City Council Elections: Lea Ward (3 members)
Party	Candidate	Votes	%	±%
Liberal Democrats	Christine Abram	903	18.90	
Liberal Democrats	Norman Abram	870	18.20	
Liberal Democrats	Pauline Brown	837	17.51	
Conservative	Sarah Critchley	576	12.05	
Conservative	Pauline Gaskell	561	11.74	
Conservative	William Parkinson	557	11.66	
Labour	Barbara Maclaren	181	3.79	
Labour	Marie Johnson	169	3.54	
Labour	Halima Patel	125	2.62	

=== Moor Park ===
Preston City Council Elections: Moor Park Ward (2 members)
Party	Candidate	Votes	%	±%
Labour	John Collins	655	33.23	
Labour	Francesco de Molfetta	608	30.85	
Conservative	Hugh Docherty	284	14.41	
Independent	Michael Moulding	247	12.53	
Conservative	Gulam Mulla	177	8.98	

=== Preston Rural East ===
Preston City Council Elections: Preston Rural East Ward (2 members)
Party	Candidate	Votes	%	±%
Conservative	Geoff Swarbrick	926	44.84	
Conservative	Neil Cartwright	905	43.83	
Labour	John Houghton	234	11.33	

=== Preston Rural North ===
Preston City Council Elections: Preston Rural North Ward (3 members)
Party	Candidate	Votes	%	±%
Conservative	Ken Hudson	1,826	28.89	
Conservative	Martin Landless	1,746	27.62	
Conservative	Kathryn Calder	1,715	27.13	
Liberal Democrats	Matthew Banks	627	9.92	
Labour	Marcus Johnstone	407	6.44	

=== Ribbleton ===
Preston City Council Elections: Ribbleton Ward (3 members)
Party	Candidate	Votes	%	±%
Labour	Patricia Woods	1,000	23.24	
Labour	Andrew Campbell	985	22.89	
Labour	Brian Rollo	924	21.47	
Conservative	Paul Balshaw	419	9.74	
Conservative	Stephen Blair	404	9.39	
Conservative	Gabriele Valderrema-Galves	314	7.30	
Independent	Ronald Yates	257	5.97	

=== Riversway ===
Preston City Council Elections: Riversway Ward (3 members)
Party	Candidate	Votes	%	±%
Liberal Democrats (politician)	Alan Valentine	697	26.34	
Labour	Elaine Abbot	650	24.57	
Labour	Bhikhu Patel	581	21.96	
Green	Richard Merrick	290	10.96	
Conservative	Roger McManus	230	8.69	
Conservative	Peter Mullineaux	198	7.48	

=== St Georges ===
Preston City Council Elections: St Georges Ward (2 members)
Party	Candidate	Votes	%	±%
Labour	Yunis Khan	491	41.23	
Labour	Siraz Natha	471	39.55	
Conservative	Richard Gorrell	229	19.23	

=== St Matthews ===
Preston City Council Elections: St Matthews Ward (3 members)
Party	Candidate	Votes	%	±%
Labour	Albert Richardson	907	30.90	
Labour	Veronica Afrin	785	26.75	
Labour	Ian Hall	762	25.96	
Conservative	Julian Sedgewick	263	8.96	
Conservative	Bernard Whalley	218	7.43	

=== Sharoe Green ===
Preston City Council Elections: Sharoe Green Ward (3 members)
Party	Candidate	Votes	%	±%
Conservative	Rowena Edmondson	1,067	20.86	
Conservative	Elizabeth Clarkson	1,043	20.39	
Conservative	Eric Fazackerley	1,041	20.35	
Liberal Democrats	Peter Newsham	375	7.33	
Liberal Democrats	Gregory Vickers	341	6.67	
Liberal Democrats	Edward Rowland	322	6.30	
Labour	Terence Mattinson	319	6.24	
Labour	Paul Jackson	309	6.04	
Labour	Rose Donnelly	298	5.83	

=== Town Centre ===
Preston City Council Elections: Town Centre Ward (3 members)
Party	Candidate	Votes	%	±%
Labour	Ronald Atkins	802	22.37	
Labour	Ken Cole	786	21.92	
Labour	Musa Ahmed Jiwa	708	19.75	
Liberal Democrats	Ayub Bodi	397	11.07	
Liberal Democrats	Anne-Marie Riedel	273	7.62	
Conservative	Jane Balshaw	223	6.22	
Conservative	Christine Sharp	203	5.66	
Conservative	Ronald Smith	193	5.38	

=== Tulketh ===
Preston City Council Elections: Tulketh Ward (3 members)
Party	Candidate	Votes	%	±%
Labour	Jean Al-Serraj	764	19.70	
Labour	Matthew Brown	718	18.51	
Conservative	Margaret McManus	680	17.53	
Labour	James Hull	673	17.35	
Conservative	Peter Hunter	583	15.03	
Conservative	Paul Swallow	566	14.60	
Liberal Democrats	Michael Gardner	197	5.08	
Liberal Democrats	Stella Stanley	181	4.67	
Liberal Democrats	Erica Wysoczanski	136	3.51	

=== University ===
Preston City Council Elections: University Ward (2 members)
Party	Candidate	Votes	%	±%
Labour	Carl Crompton	256	25.22	
Labour	John Swindells	223	21.97	
Liberal Democrats	Colin Clarke	184	18.13	
Liberal Democrats	June Dodd	176	17.34	
Conservative	Peter McElhone	89	8.77	
Conservative	Jacqueline Smith	87	8.57	

== See also ==
- Preston (UK Parliament constituency)
- Fulwood, Lancashire
