= List of works by Robert Roper =

Robert Roper (1757–1838) was an English architect who practised from Preston, Lancashire. His work was mainly on churches and country houses in the northwest of England. The list is likely to be incomplete.

== Key ==
Grade	Criteria
Grade I	Buildings of exceptional interest, sometimes considered to be internationally important.
Grade II*	Particularly important buildings of more than special interest.
Grade II	Buildings of national importance and special interest.
"—" denotes a work that is not graded.

== Principal works ==
Name	Location	Photograph	Date	Notes	Grade
St Mary's Church	Haighton, Lancashire; 53.8011°N 2.6779°W		1792–94	(Attributed) A new church in brick.	—
Claughton Hall	Claughton, Lancashire; 54.0887°N 2.6550°W		1816–17	A country house later replaced by a new house of 1958, incorporating some of Roper's furnishings.	—
Leagram Hall	Chipping, Lancashire; 53.8923°N 2.5731°W		1822	A country house in Georgian style. Since demolished, and replaced by a new house in 1963.	—
St Michael's Church	Kirkham, Lancashire; 53.7843°N 2.8710°W		1822	Roper rebuilt the nave, the steeple was added in 1843–44 by Edmund Sharpe, and in 1853 the chancel was rebuilt, probably by Joseph Hansom.	II*
Holy Trinity Church	Hoghton, Lancashire; 53.7281°N 2.5851°W		1822–23	Built as a Commissioners' church, and almost completely rebuilt in about 1887 by James Bertwistle who added the tower, chancel and south aisle.	II
Leighton Hall	Yealand Conyers, Lancashire; 54.1630°N 2.7758°W		1822–25	(Attributed) A Gothic façade in white limestone was added to the country house.	II*
St John the Baptist's Church	Broughton, Lancashire; 53.8035°N 2.7167°W		1823	Rebuilt the nave, retaining the tower of 1533. In 1905–06 the chancel was added by Austin and Paley.	II*
Thurnham Hall	Thurnham, Lancashire; 53.9842°N 2.8197°W		1823	Roper added a thin Gothic façade to a country house dating from about 1600. It has since been converted into a leisure centre and self-catering apartments.	I
St John the Evangelist's Church	Clifton, Lancashire; 53.7761°N 2.8161°W		1824–25	A new church replacing an older church on the site. A chancel was added in 1852, possibly by Joseph Hansom, followed by a tower by Paley and Austin in 1873.	—
