= Towers (surname) =

Towers is a surname, and may refer to:

- Alan Towers (1934–2008), British television presenter
- Alice Towers (born 2002), British racing cyclist
- Amy Towers (born 1970), American businesswoman and philanthropist
- Bill Towers (politician) (1892–1962), Australian politician
- Bill Towers (footballer) (1920–2000), English footballer
- Constance Towers (born 1933), American actress
- Cyril Towers (1906–1985), Australian rugby union footballer
- Dean Towers (born 1990), Australian rules footballer
- Dick Towers (1931–2023), American football coach and college athletics administrator
- Elizabeth Towers (1899–1985), American philanthropist and socialite
- Frank Towers (1835–1886), English actor, playwright and stage producer
- Gordon Towers (1919–1999), Canadian politician
- Graham Towers (1897–1975), Canadian economist
- Harry Alan Towers (1920–2009), British radio and film producer, and screenwriter
- Ian Towers (1940–2015), English footballer
- Isaac Towers (born 1998), English Paralympian athlete
- Jack Towers (1914–2010), American audio engineer
- James Towers (1897–1977), English soldier, recipient of the Victoria Cross
- James Towers (obstetrician) (1757–1820), Scottish obstetrician and academic
- James S. Towers (1859–1926), American farmer, businessman and politician from Wisconsin
- Jim Towers (1933–2010), English footballer
- John Towers (bishop) (died 1649), English churchman, Bishop of Peterborough
- John Towers (businessman) (born 1948), English founder of Phoenix Venture Holdings
- John Towers (footballer) (1913–1979), English footballer
- John Towers (minister) (c.1747–1804), English Independent minister
- John Henry Towers (1885–1955), American admiral and naval aviator
- John T. Towers (1809–1855), American official, mayor of Washington, D.C. from 1854 to 1856
- Joseph Towers (1737–1799), English Dissenter and biographer
- Josh Towers (born 1977), American baseball pitcher
- Julie Towers (born 1976), Australian field hockey player
- Katharine Towers (born 1961), British poet
- Kevin Towers (1961–2018), American baseball player and manager
- Kirsten Moore-Towers (born 1992), Canadian pair skater
- Kristen Towers (born 1976), Australian field hockey player
- Kristin Towers-Rowles, American actress and singer
- Lee Towers (born 1946), Dutch singer
- Luke Towers (born 1988), Australian cricketer
- Myke Towers (born 1994), Puerto Rican rapper
- Neil Towers (1923–2004), Canadian botanist
- Pedro Towers (1921–1983), Argentine rower
- Richard Towers (born 1979), British boxer
- Robert Towers (born 1936), American actor
- Sherry Towers, American-Canadian statistician and data scientist
- Tony Towers (born 1952), English footballer
- William Towers (rugby union) (1861–1904), English rugby union footballer, capped twice for Wales
- William Towers (priest) (1681–1745), priest and academic, vice-chancellor of the University of Cambridge
- William H. Towers (died 1959), American state legislator in Kansas
- William Towers (countertenor), English countertenor

== See also ==
- Tower (surname)
