= Tower (surname) =

Tower is an English surname which may refer to:

- Ashley B. Tower (1847–1901), American mill architect and engineer
- Charlemagne Tower (1809–1889), American lawyer, soldier, and capitalist
- Charlemagne Tower, Jr. (1848–1923), American diplomat
- David H. Tower (1832–1907), American mill architect and engineer
- Henrietta Tower (1856-1933), American art collectionist and wife of George Washington Wurts
- Ion Tower (1889–1940), British Royal Navy officer, World War II air raid victim
- Jeremiah Tower (born 1942), American chef
- Joan Tower (born 1938), American composer of classical music
- John Tower (1925–1991), American politician
- Wells Tower (born 1973), American writer
- William Hogarth Tower (1871–1950), American philatelist
- William Lawrence Tower (1872–1967), American zoologist
- Zealous Bates Tower (1819–1900), American soldier

== See also ==
- Towers (surname)
