= Listed buildings in Broughton, Lancashire =

Broughton is a civil parish in the City of Preston, Lancashire, England. It contains 15 listed buildings that are recorded in the National Heritage List for England. Of these, one is at Grade II*, the middle grade, and the others are at Grade II, the lowest grade. The parish contains the village of Broughton, and surrounding countryside. The listed buildings consist of three houses, a cottage that has been converted into a museum, two churches, one of which has associated listed structures, two schools, a pinfold, two war memorials, and a milestone.

== Key ==
Grade	Criteria
II*	Particularly important buildings of more than special interest
II	Buildings of national importance and special interest

== Buildings ==
Name and location	Photograph	Date	Notes	Grade
Bank Hall and Bank Hall Farmhouse; 53.80513°N 2.72381°W	—	Late medieval (probable)	A manor house or farmhouse, later converted into two dwellings, it has a timber-framed core, including a full cruck truss. It is clad in brick which is partly rendered, and has a slate roof. The building has two storeys, and a T-shaped plan, with a front of six bays and a rear wing. The windows are sashes. Inside are a large inglenook and a bressumer.	II
St John the Baptist's Church; 53.80344°N 2.71682°W		1533	The oldest part of the church is the tower. The rest of the church was rebuilt in 1823 by Robert Roper, and further additions were made in 1905–06 by Austin and Paley. It is in sandstone with slate roofs, and consists of a nave, a north porch, a chancel with an organ chamber to the south, and a west tower. The tower is in three stages with diagonal buttresses, an embattled parapet, and a southwest stair turret.	II*
Daniels Farmhouse; 53.80125°N 2.69477°W	—	Mid to late 17th century	A sandstone house with quoins and a roof of blue slate. It has two storeys and T-shaped plan with a main range and a later rear wing. The windows are mullioned. Inside is a large inglenook and a bressumer.	II
Mounting block 53.80340°N 2.71720°W	—	18th century (or earlier) (probable)	The mounting block is at the gateway to the churchyard of St John the Baptist's Church. It is small and in stone, and consists of two steps.	II
Church Cottage; 53.80380°N 2.71637°W		18th century	The cottage has been restored and converted into a museum. It is in rendered brick with a thatched roof. The cottage has two bays, the first bay with 1 1/2 storeys, and the second bay with two. At the rear is a lean-to extension. In the first bay is a casement window, and in the second bay are sliding sash windows in both floors.	II
Pinfold; 53.80739°N 2.72223°W	—	18th century (probable)	The pinfold is in sandstone with walls about 1.5 metres (4 ft 11 in) high. These form a rectangular enclosure about 10 metres (33 ft) long and 8 metres (26 ft) high. The walls have rounded coping, and there is a gate with a lintel at the northwest.	II
Stocks; 53.80333°N 2.71717°W	—	18th century (probable)	The stocks are near gateway to the churchyard of St John the Baptist's Church, and were restored in 1902. They consist of two stone slabs, with two wooden beams and metal shackles, and have housing for two occupants. Behind is a stone bench carrying an inscription relating to the restoration.	II
Sundial; 53.80337°N 2.71672°W	—	18th century (probable)	The sundial stands to the south of St John the Baptist's Church. It is in stone, and consists of an octagonal vase-shaped pedestal with a moulded square foot and cap. On the top is a brass plate and a gnomon.	II
Milestone; 53.81219°N 2.72575°W		Mid to late 18th century	The milestone is in stone, and has a triangular plan with convex sides and a rounded top. The sides have panels with the distances in miles to Garstang and to Preston.	II
St Mary's Church and Presbytery; 53.80106°N 2.67795°W		1792–94	A Roman Catholic church in brick with a sandstone plinth and quoins and a slate roof. It has a cruciform plan with five bays and two-bay transepts. At the west end is a bellcote and a semicircular Tuscan porch. The presbytery attached to the east of the church has two bays and two storeys, and a two-story canted bay window.	II
Roman Catholic School; 53.80124°N 2.67936°W		1836	The school has later been used as a nursery. It is in sandstone with a slate roof, and has an H-shaped plan. The building is symmetrical with a three-bay central block and single-storey gabled cross wings with tablets in the tympani. At the top of the main block is a moulded cornice and a parapet with a pediment containing the date in Roman numerals. The central doorway has a moulded architrave and a cornice.	II
Broughton Church of England Primary School; 53.80381°N 2.71684°W		1843	The school is in sandstone with a slate roof, and is in Jacobean style. It has a single storey with three wide bays, and there is a later wing at the rear. On the front are buttresses and windows, three of which have three stepped lights under gablets. To the left is a porch with a Tudor arched doorway, above which is a panel and a crowstepped parapet, and there is a similar porch behind the right bay.	II
Stone House; 53.81277°N 2.71338°W	—	1911	A house with Arts and Crafts features in sandstone with stone-slate roofs. It has two storeys, and an L-shaped plan, with a three-bay main range facing south and a long rear east wing. The windows are mullioned, and some also contain transoms. The outer bays of the main range are gabled, and the upper floor of the centre set-back bay is timber-framed with an oriel window and a balcony. Some of the interior furniture, dating from about 1700, was moved from the Castle Inn in Preston.	II
Broughton in Amounderness War Memorial; 53.80546°N 2.72154°W		1921	The war memorial stands in an enclosure on the west side of the former A6 road; it is in buff sandstone, and consists of a wheelhead cross about 5 metres (16 ft) tall with bosses on the front. The cross has a tapering shaft with a chamfered foot, and a tapering plinth on a square two-stepped base. On the plinth is a bronze plaque with an inscription and the names of those lost in the First World War. Behind the cross is an altar with an inscription on the front, and behind it is a reredos with five niches, the central niche with a carving of a wheelhead cross. Flanking the reredos are walls each containing a plaque in Westmorland slate with the names of those lost in the Second World War.	II
Fernyhalgh War Memorial; 53.80089°N 2.67820°W		1921	The war memorial is in a roadside garden adjacent to the churchyard of St Mary's Church. It is in granite on a concrete base with inset ceramic tiles, and consists of a Greek cross on a pyramidal plinth with a square foot on a base of two steps. On the arms of the cross are oak leaves in relief, and in the centre is "IHS". The cross and shaft have moulded borders, and the upper part of the shaft has crossed palm leaves. There are inscriptions on the lower part of the shaft and the plinth, and on the plinth are the names of those lost in the two World Wars.	II
