= Tower Homestead and Masonic Temple =

Historic house in New York, United States

- U.S. National Register of Historic Places
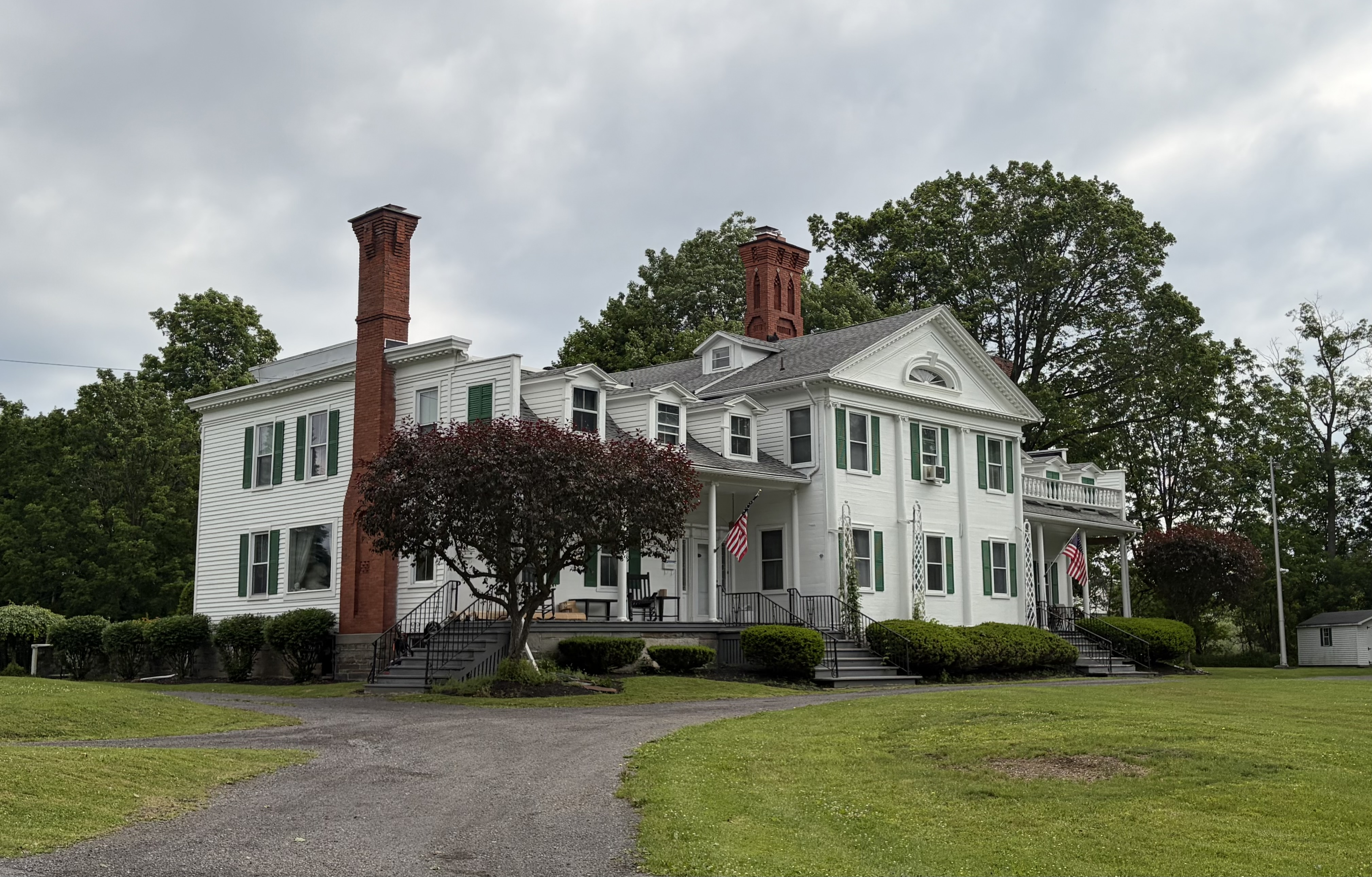
- The former Tower Homestead in 2026

- Location within New York Location within the United States
- Location: 210 Tower St. and Sanger St., Waterville, New York
- Coordinates: 42°55′51″N 75°23′1″W
- Area: 6.3 acres (2.5 ha)
- Built: ca. 1800
- Architect: Multiple
- Architectural style: Mixed (more Than 2 Styles From Different Periods)
- NRHP reference No.: 77000968
- Added to NRHP: October 5, 1977

Tower Homestead and Masonic Temple, also known as Harding Residence and Masonic Temple, is a historic home and Masonic Temple located at Waterville in Oneida County, New York. The house is an 85-by-50-foot (26 by 15 m) residence and consists of three attached sections: a central Greek Revival style, two-story central section built in 1830; an older Federal-style wing built about 1800; and a west wing built in 1910 by Charlemagne Tower, Jr. The homestead also includes a small brick building built as a law office by Charlemagne Tower and later used as a schoolhouse, a barn, two horse barns, the old gardener's house, a small bathhouse, two modern garages, and a modern nursing home (1973). The Masonic Lodge building was built in 1896 by Reuben Tower II as an office. It was later purchased by a local Masonic Lodge and used as a meeting hall. It features a 103-foot-tall (31 m), three-stage tower.

It was listed on the National Register of Historic Places in 1977.
