= Villa Sciarra (Rome) =

Park in Rome, Italy

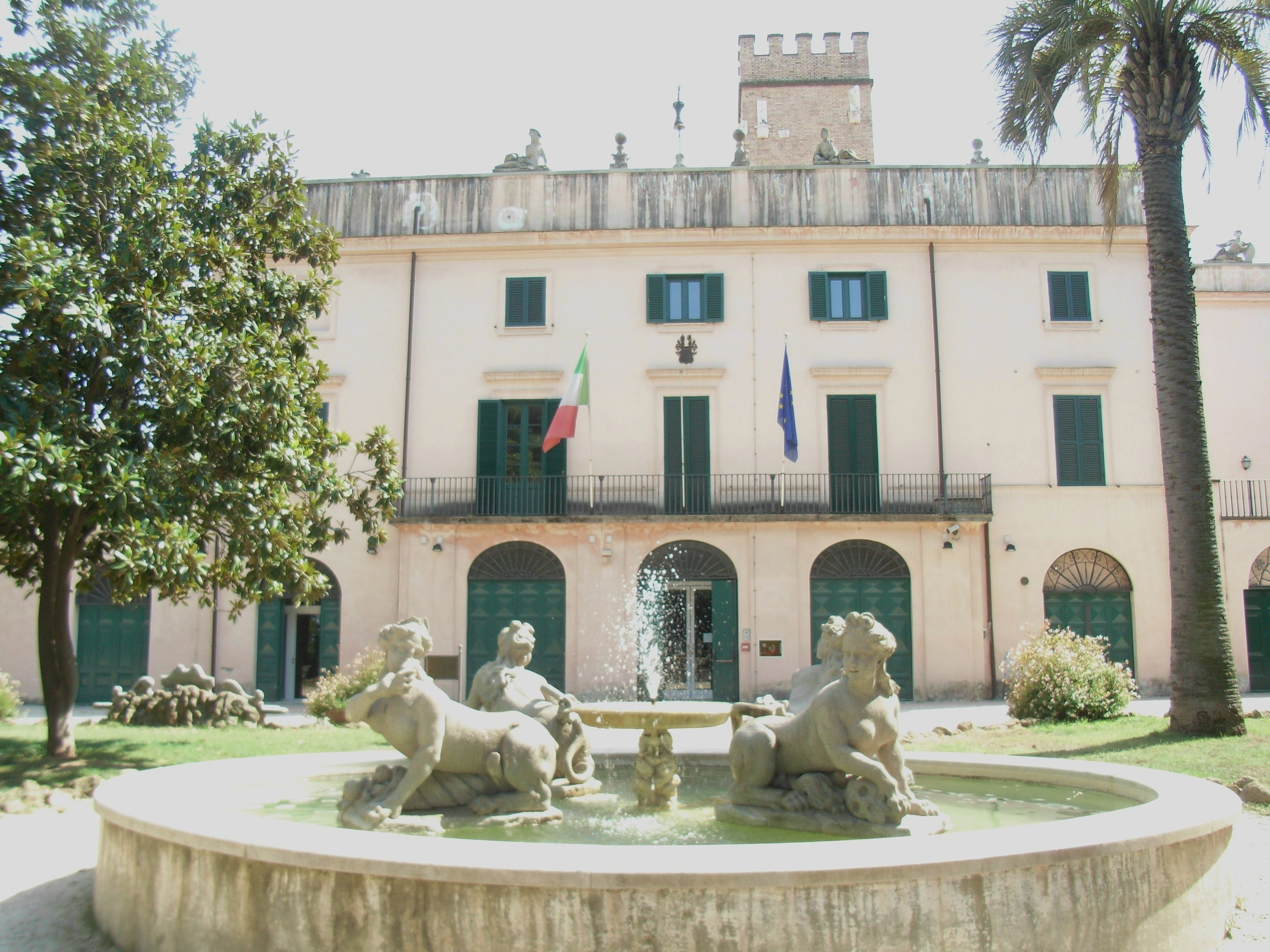
- Villa Sciarra at the centre of the park
- Click on the map to see marker
- Coordinates: 41°53′N 12°28′E

Villa Sciarra is a park in Rome named for the villa at its centre. It is located between the neighborhoods of Trastevere, Gianicolo and Monteverde Vecchio.

== History ==
In 1653 Cardinal Antonio Barberini bought most of the land within the Janiculum walls between Porta Portese and Porta San Pancrazio to build an estate mainly used as a farm. In 1811 the property was acquired by the Colonna di Sciarra, who gave the villa its current name and enlarged it by acquiring the land belonging to Monastero di San Cosimato. In the 1880s Prince Maffeo Sciarra Colonna went bankrupt and the estate was split and a large part of it became a residential area. The last owners, George Washington Wurts and his wife Henrietta Tower, who was the sister of Charlemagne Tower, established the remaining land as a botanic garden and aviary complex embellished with an original sculptural decoration coming from an 18th-century Lombard villa near Milan. The park was given to Benito Mussolini by the widowed Henrietta in 1932 on condition it became a public park.

== Location ==
The best approach is from Viale Trastevere. At the Ministry of Education turn onto Via E. Morosini, then take the first left (Via Dandolo) to make the climb and turn left at Via Calandrelli. In Via Calandrelli there are two entrances which are the first giving on to Piazzale Wurts, designed by Pio Piacentini and the second at Largo E. Mintilli.
