= Church Cottage =

Church Cottage or Church Cottages may refer to:

- Church Cottage, Eccleston, listed building in Cheshire, England
- Church Cottage Museum, listed building and museum in Lancashire, England
- Church Cottage, Tutshill, listed building in Gloucestershire, England
- Church Cottages, York, listed building in York, England
- Church View and Church Cottages, listed building in Barnet, London, England

== See also ==
- Ferron Presbyterian Church and Cottage, Utah, United States
