= George Washington Wurts =

American diplomat and art collector

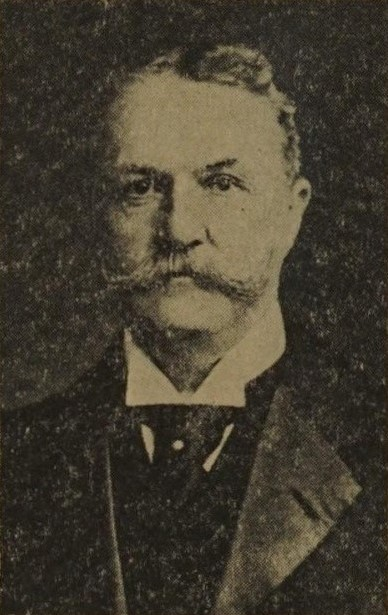
George W. Wurts

George Washington Wurts (March 26, 1843 in Philadelphia – January 25, 1928 in Rome) was an American diplomat and art collector.

== Early life ==
George Washington Wurts was one of eight children of William Wurts of Trenton, New Jersey. William Wurts, who with his brothers Maurice, Charles and John founded the Delaware and Hudson Canal Company, left a significant inheritance to his children on his death in 1858. George Wurts attended the University of Pennsylvania for two years before joining the Diplomatic Service.

== Diplomatic career ==
From 1864 to 1865, Wurts served in Madrid, Spain before being transferred to Turin, Italy where he became an assistant to George Perkins Marsh. Marsh, the first United States minister to the Kingdom of Italy, found the young Wurts to be "cultivated, hard-working, descreet, intensely loyal". In 1869, Wurts moved to Florence, Italy and became the Secretary of Legation, a position which he held even after Marsh's departure in 1881 when he was 81 years old. In 1882, Wurts was assigned to St Petersburg, Russia and remained in his post there until 1892 when he was transferred back to Italy. Wurts time in the diplomatic services spanned about thirty years, although he never fulfilled his ambition to become an ambassador.

== Art collection ==
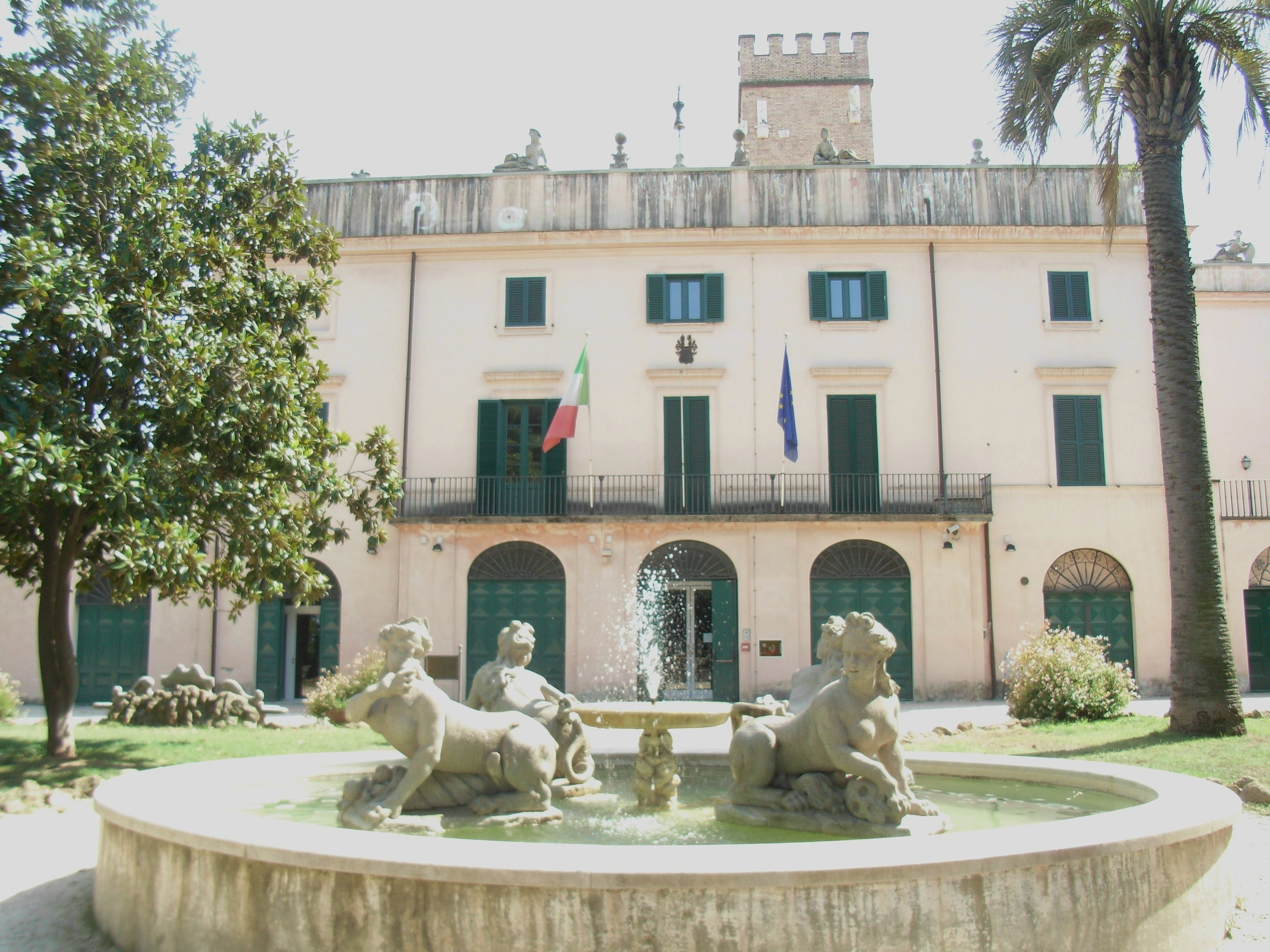
Villa Sciarra in Rome

Wurts married Henrietta Tower in 1898 and the couple moved to Rome in 1902. With her inherited fortune, Tower assisted Wurts in the acquisition of the Villa Sciarra-Wurts (Rome) and in its decoration. Together they expanded his already significant art collection, which he began in 1876, to approximately 4,000 works. The collection includes ceramics, textiles, tapestries, 19th-century Russian hats, stuffed bears, 80 wooden statues from Germany, and a variety of paintings (including works by Ottaviano Nelli, Vincenzo Pagani, and Paolo Veneziano). The collection also includes works from China and Japan. Wurts died in 1928 and by 1933 Tower had donated their villa to the Italian state. Following her death, their art collection was also donated to Italy, with the proviso that it remain in a museum. The collection was moved to the Museo nazionale del Palazzo di Venezia where it remains today.

George Washington Wurts and his wife Henrietta Tower Wurts were interred at the Protestant Cemetery in Rome.
