= Listed buildings in Haighton =

Haighton is a civil parish in the City of Preston, Lancashire, England. It contains seven listed buildings that are recorded in the National Heritage List for England. All of the listed buildings are designated at Grade II, the lowest of the three grades, which is applied to "buildings of national importance and special interest". The parish is entirely rural, and all the listed buildings are houses, farmhouses, or farm buildings

== Buildings ==
Name and location	Photograph	Date	Notes
Outbuilding, Clarkson's Fold Farm; 53.80022°N 2.65274°W	—	17th century (probable)	Initially a farmhouse with an integral barn, later used as a farm building. It is cruck-framed, with brick cladding on a stone plinth, partly rendered, and a corrugated sheet roof on thatch. The building has four bays, and the former house has 1 1/2 storeys with windows that are mainly sashes. Inside the building are three full crucks, and inside the former house is a timber-framed partition.
Haighton Manor; 53.80899°N 2.65814°W		1657	Originally a manor house, later converted for other uses. It is in sandstone and has a slate roof. The building has an E-shaped plan, and is in two and 2 1/2 storeys. The front is symmetrical with a main range, a central protruding two-storey porch, and cross wings, all of which are gabled. Most of the windows are mullioned, and in the west wing are two Venetian windows and a sash window.
Barn, Haighton Hall Farm; 53.81152°N 2.64612°W	—	Late 17th century (probable)	A barn and shippon in sandstone and some brick, with quoins and a slate roof. There are opposed segmental-arched wagon entrances with chamfered surrounds, rusticated voussoirs, and keystones. In addition there are doorways altered into windows, and a loading door.
Haighton Top Farmhouse; 53.80367°N 2.68147°W	—	Late 17th century	A house built on an earlier timber-framed core, with brick cladding on a stone plinth, and a slate roof. A later addition has given the house an L-shaped plan. It has two storeys, and the two-gabled east front has a round-headed doorway. Most of the windows are mullioned and contain casements.The house was a Dame School run by Dame Alice which was well known for its Catholic pupils.
Seamark Farmhouse; 53.80396°N 2.67025°W	—	Late 17th century	The farmhouse was later extended. It is in brick, partly on a stone plinth, and has a slate roof with stone gable copings. The house has an L-shaped plan, and is in two storeys. The original part has two bays, with a single-bay extension to the right, and a single-bay wing to the front. The windows are of various types. Inside the house is an inglenook, a bressumer, and wattle and daub partition walls.
Haighton Hall Farmhouse; 53.81116°N 2.64591°W	—	c. 1700	The farmhouse is in sandstone with some brick, and has quoins and a slate roof. It is in 2 1/2 storeys, and has three bays, and a gabled wing to the south. The main doorway is on the east front, and in the south gable is a doorway with a moulded surround and a shaped lintel. Most of the windows are mullioned.
Haighton House; 53.79876°N 2.66190°W	—	1820	A country house that was extended in 1832. It is in brick with sandstone dressings and a slate roof, and is in Georgian style. The house has two storeys and a square plan, with fronts of five bays. At the top of the house is a moulded cornice and a low parapet. On the entrance front the centre bay projects forward and contains a porch with paired Tuscan pillars and an entablature. The windows are sashes, and there are bay windows on the sides.
