= Emily Underdown =

English writer, novelist and poet

- Born: 28 July 1863; Broughton, Lancashire, England
- Died: 5 September 1947 (aged 84); Hendon, Middlesex, England
- Education: Bachelor of Arts
- Alma mater: University of London
- Occupations: Writer, novelist, and poet

Emily Underdown (1863–1947) was an English writer, novelist and poet. She is best known for popularising Dante (1265–1321) and for her children's books. Many of her works are written under the pseudonym Norley Chester, which name appears to have been taken from the village of Norley, Cheshire, near the town of Chester. The use of pseudonyms was common with female writers of the time. She also illustrated the book The Pageant of The Year: A Garden Record In Verse.

According to Chaucer as Children's Literature: Retellings from the Victorian and Edwardian Eras, Underdown's The Gateway to Chaucer "...is probably the most thoughtful presentation to children..." of the complicated work, and "...one of the most thoughtful collections with great philosophical and historical interest."

She is also remembered as a "war poet" of the First World War for her work "The Gifts of War".

== Biography ==
Emily Underdown was born on 28 July 1863 at Higher Broughton, Lancashire, England. Her parents were Lieutenant-Colonel Robert George Underdown and Lydia Underdown (née Dacombe). She was the second of four children. Not much is known about her early life other than her graduation from University College London in 1898 (UCL Record Office). She lived in Lancashire and Yorkshire during her early life, moving to London at some point after 1901. She did not marry.

She died in London on 5 September 1947. Her brother, Herbert William Underdown (born 8 July 1864; Charterhouse; Cambridge (Pemberton) B.A. L.L.M), was a solicitor (Birkbeck Bank Chambers) and a well-known art collector and antiquarian scholar.

== Selected bibliography ==
=== Books ===
- Olga's Dream: a nineteenth-century fairy tale by Norley Chester, from original illustrations designed specially by Harry Furniss and Irving Montagu; London: Skeffington & Son, 1892.
- The Carved Box: a story from Switzerland, London, Glasgow and Dublin: Blackie & Son Ltd, 1894.
- The Story of Fancy by Norley Chester. Chapter VIII in Aunt Mai's Annual by Fanny Hanson, Ernst von Wildenbruch, Aunt Mai, Bessie Green, Emily Underdown, M. Hoysted and (editor) Mrs. Francis F. Steinthal. Illustrated by Alice Mitchell. Westminster, London: Archibald Constable and Co., 1894 .
- Dante Vignettes, Elliot Stock, 1895.
- Peter, der Holzschnitzer. Berlin: Christl. Zeitschriftenver, 1896. German language.
- Stories from Dante, London/New York: F. Warne and Co., 1898.
- Songs and Sonnets, London: Elliot Stock, 1899.
- A Plain Woman's Part, London: Edward Arnold, 1900.
- Lohengrin: retold from Wagner. With Richard Wagner. London: T. Nelson, 1900
- Dante and Beatrice, a play founded on incidents in Dante's Vita Nuova. London: S. Sonnenschein & Co., 1903.
- A Double Crown by Norley Chester (p. 174-) in “The Passing of Victoria. The Poets’ Tribute”, containing poems by Thomas Hardy, V. E. Henley, A. C. Benson, Sir Lewis Morris, Flora Annie Steel, Violet Fane and others. Edited by J. A. Hammerton. London: Horace Marshall & Son.
- Cristina: a romance of Italy in olden days. London: Swan Sonnenschein, 1903.
- Mick, An Ugly Dog. No publisher, 1905.
- Medallions from Early Florentine History, London: Swan Sonnenschein, 1906, viii + 254 pp.
- Knights of the Grail: Lohengrin, Galahad. London and New York: T. Nelson, 1908.
- Tristram and Iseult, by Emily Underdown in The Girl's Budget of Short Stories (Jean McIntosh, ed.), Thomas Nelson & Sons, 1912.
- The Rose and the Ring, London, Edinburgh, Dublin and New York: Thomas Nelson & Sons, 1912.
- A Hero's Helpmeet and Other Stories, Thomas Nelson & Sons, 1913.
- Stories from Chaucer, Thomas Nelson & Sons, 1913.
- The Dumb Princess, London: Thomas Nelson & Sons, 1913.
- The Gateway To Chaucer, Thomas Nelson, 1914.
- War Songs, London: Riley, 1914.
- Anita Garibaldi, by Emily Underdown in Wild Thyme (Mrs Herbert Strang, ed.). Oxford University Press, 1918.
- The Adventures of Don Quixote, Thomas Nelson & Sons, 1921. Abridged and adapted for children.
- Three northern romances: Siegfried-Lohengrin-Undine. Old Tales Retold. With Richard Wilson. London: Thomas Nelson, 1925.
- Stories from William Morris, Thomas Nelson & Sons, 1925. Previously published as Gateway To Romance, this is a retelling of a selection of stories from The Earthly Paradise by William Morris.
- The Pageant of The Year A Garden Record in Verse, Simkin, Marshall, Hamilton, Kent & Co, 1924. Illustrated by Emily Underdown.
- The Approach to Chaucer, Nelson, 1926.
- The Approach to Spenser, London: Thomas Nelson & Sons, 1932.

=== Essays (by Norley Chester) ===
- "Early Tuscan Poets", in Sylvanus Urban (ed.), Gentleman's Magazine, London: Chatto & Windus, 1899 (pp. 329–339).
- "How I didn’t become an Author". An essay in the Temple Bar Journal; reproduced in “The Living Age”, 7th series, Vol. VIII, July, August and September 1900. Published by Living Age Co., 1900. Editors Eliakim Littell and Robert S. Littell. Vol. 226.
- "Historical Influences of the 'Divine Comedy'", in Sylvanus Urban (ed.), Gentleman’s Magazine, Vol. CCLXXXVIII, January to June 1900, London: Chatto & Windus, 1900 (pp. 167–176). Originally in February 1900 edition of Gentleman’s Magazine.
