= Broughton, Lancashire =

Village in Lancashire, England

Coordinates: 53.809°N 2.723°W

Broughton
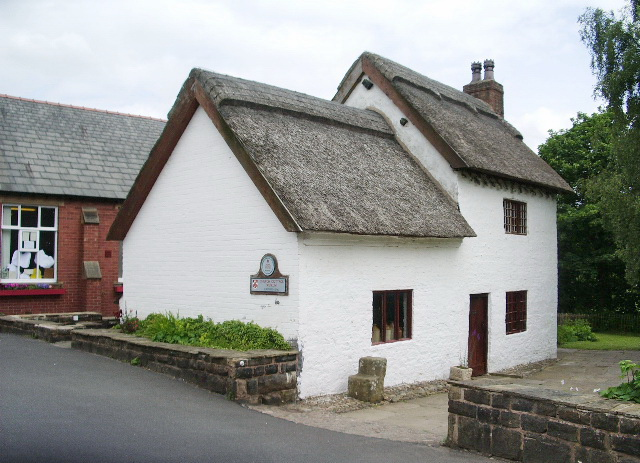
- Church Cottage Museum, Broughton

- Shown within the City of Preston district Location within Lancashire
- Population: 2,467 (2021)
- OS grid reference: SD523350
- Civil parish: Broughton
- District: Preston
- Shire county: Lancashire
- Region: North West
- Country: England
- Sovereign state: United Kingdom
- Post town: PRESTON
- Postcode district: PR3
- Dialling code: 01772
- Police: Lancashire
- Fire: Lancashire
- Ambulance: North West
- UK Parliament: Ribble Valley

Civil parishes in the City of Preston
- Barton
- Broughton
- Goosnargh
- Grimsargh
- Haighton
- Ingol & Tanterton
- Lea
- Whittingham
- Woodplumpton

Broughton is a village and civil parish in the City of Preston, Lancashire, England, approximately 4 miles (6 km) north of Preston city centre. According to the 2001 census it had a population of 1,735, decreasing to 1,722 at the 2011 Census, increasing to 2,467 at the 2021. The parish is included in Preston Rural East ward of Preston city council, and the Preston Rural division of Lancashire County council.

The parish (officially Broughton-in-Amounderness) was part of Preston Rural District throughout its existence from 1894 to 1974. In 1974 the parish became part of the Borough of Preston, which became a city in 2002.

== Geography ==
The civil parish boundary largely follows the West Coast Main Line railway to the west, Barton Brook and Dean Brook to the north, Moss Leach Brook, Fernyhalgh Lane and Blundell Brook to the east, and the B6241 road and M55 motorway to the south. Broughton Parish Council recognises three distinct areas of the parish: the largest part includes the village and its surrounds, Broughton Parish South is an area south of the M55 adjoining north Preston and Broughton Parish East is a smaller area south east of the M6/M55 junction that includes Fernyhalgh Lane.

== History ==
Broughton manor was originally owned by Earl Tostig and subsequently by Uhtred, a Saxon thegn whose family took the name Singleton. In the reign of King John the manor was taken over by Theobald Walter, but returned in 1261 to William Singleton by Henry III. It was Gilbert de Singleton's in 1635 and sold to the Langtons in the 16th century. The Rawstorne family acquired it in 1735 through marriage. Tithes were still being paid to the church in the 20th century.

A "strong tower" was built of stone with a moat fed by Sharoe Brook. It was demolished in 1800 and replaced by Broughton Tower Farm. The moat was filled in during the 1930s.

== Community ==
=== Schools ===
Broughton-in-Amounderness Church of England Primary School on Church Lane has approximately 290 pupils, aged 3–11. Its roots go back to 1590 and is one of the oldest extant primary schools in the United Kingdom. One of the school buildings dates from 1843 and is Grade II listed. It is of rock-faced sandstone under a slate roof with later matching entrance gables. On the site is Church Cottage Museum.

Broughton High School on Woodplumpton Lane opened in 1975 and has approximately 900 pupils, aged 11–16.

The village has two nursery schools: Broughton Pre-School on King George V Playing Field, and Teddies Nursery, attached to the primary school.

=== Broughton & District Club ===
Situated on Whittingham Lane, the club offers flood-lit facilities for tennis and bowls. The stage in the main hall is used by for performances by the Broughton Players. The club hall also hosts parish council meetings.

=== Football ===
Broughton Amateurs AFC was formed in 1947 and plays in the Mid-Lancashire Football League. During their 'glory years' of the late 1970s through the 1980s they were managed by ex-Preston North End & Birmingham City striker Eddy Brown.

=== Churches ===
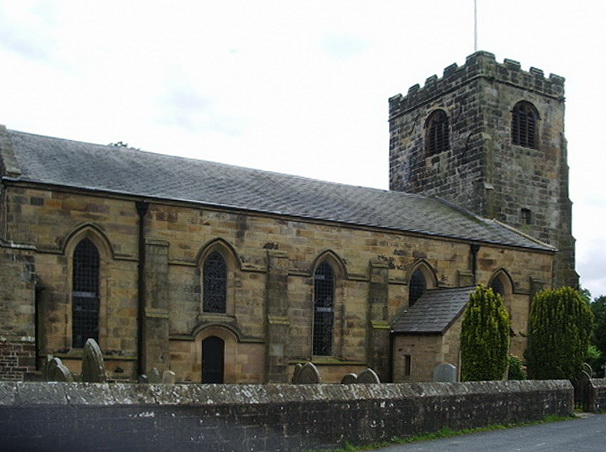
Church of St John Baptist

The parish Church of St John Baptist is the centre of a large Anglican community within the Diocese of Blackburn. It has two satellite worship centres and a parish hall in Fulwood. The church tower, which dates from 1533, is the oldest working building in Preston and is currently undergoing restoration. The nave was replaced in 1826, while the chancel was added in 1906. There is evidence of a church having been on the site in the twelfth century. The acclaimed Broughton Parish Church Choir of 20 men and 32 boy trebles is directed by John Catterall MBE and sings at two Sunday services.

The civil parish also contains the Roman Catholic St Mary's Church, Fernyhalgh.

=== Possible mosque ===
In 2022, it has been proposed that a mosque would be built at a site near the junction of the motorway in the parish. It would be situated at a high elevation and feature a Victorian mill-inspired 30 metres (98 ft) minaret which would make it one of the largest in Preston and would be visible on the skyline. However, the mosque plan has been met with opposition from both residents and local MPs as there is no Muslim community within the parish. The site was previously used as a pig farm, with access provided via D'Urton Lane for the farmer. The plans are as of April 2022 being reviewed by the government.

== Notable people ==
- Richard Herst (?? - 1628), English Roman Catholic recusant layman; Catholic martyr, beatified in 1929.
- Frederic Newton Gisborne (1824–1892), a British inventor and electrician.
- Emily Underdown (1863–1947), an English writer, novelist and poet; she popularised Dante (1265–1321)
- James Towers (1897–1977), British Army private, recipient of the Victoria Cross
- Graeme Garden (born 1943), comedian
- Dame Karen Pierce (born 1959), British Ambassador to the USA

== Telephone exchange ==
Broughton telephone exchange was the UK's first Crossbar exchange. The current exchange building, which was extended at the front in the 1980s, was built for a field trial of Plessey's new 5005A crossbar exchange in 1964 replacing Broughton's manual exchange. The village was chosen due to its relative proximity to the Plessey factory and research centre at Edge Lane Liverpool.

== Transport ==
The transport in the village is run by Stagecoach North Lancashire and Cumbria and Vision bus.

Stagecoach runs two routes through the village the 40 and the 41. The routes go to either Preston or Lancaster/Morecambe via Garstang.

The 40 runs on a Monday to Saturday Frequency. The 41 runs on Sundays. Together both routes on a Monday-Saturday make an every 30 minute frequency and every hour on a Sunday.

Vision bus run the 45 to Preston or Blackburn via Longridge and the 46 to Preston or Longridge. Both routes run every hour on Monday to Saturday and every 2 hours on Sunday.

Information correct as of March 2026.

== Sport ==
The second stage of the Tour of Britain Women's cycle race passed through Broughton in 2026.

== Bypass ==
Traffic congestion and resultant pollution from the A6 road in Broughton has been an ongoing issue since the 1970s. A bypass route to the east of the village was determined in 1991. Lancashire County Council was first granted permission for the bypass in 2001, but it was not until 2015 after public consultation that permission to proceed was given by the Secretary of State for Transport. The 1.2-mile (2 km) bypass was opened on 5 October 2017 and is named after local man James Towers, a recipient of the Victoria Cross for efforts in the First World War. The route is dualled from its junction with the M55 motorway until the B5269 Whittingham Lane roundabout, then is single carriageway to the old A6, Garstang Road north of the village. Around 18 hectares of mainly agricultural land was compulsorily purchased for the bypass.

== Gallery ==
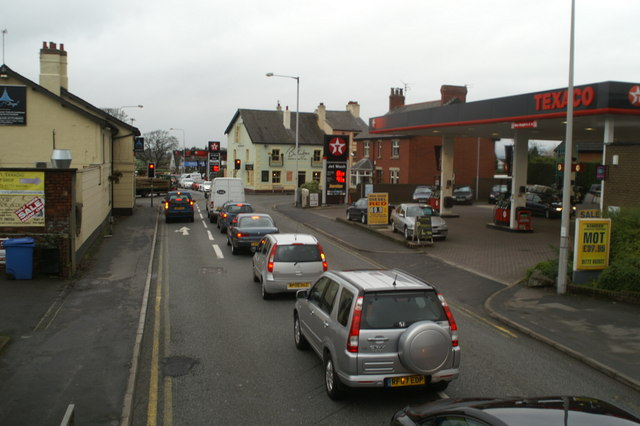
Broughton cross-roads pictured before the existence of the bypass

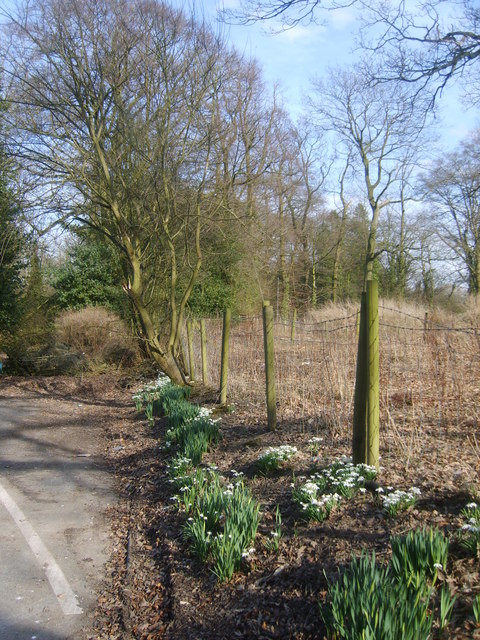
Snowdrops in Winter near Broughton

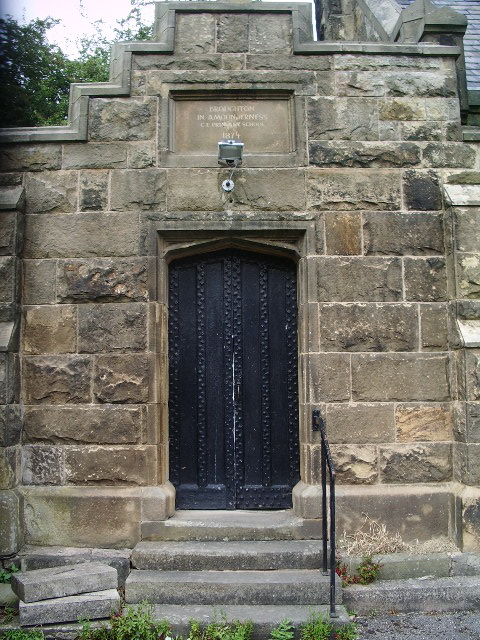
Entrance to the original Broughton C of E Primary School

== See also ==
- Listed buildings in Broughton, Lancashire
