= John Daniel (priest) =

Late 18th century English Roman Catholic priest

John Daniel (born 1745; died in Paris, 3 October 1823) was an English Roman Catholic priest, and the last effective head of the English College, Douai.

== Life ==
John Daniel was born in 1745, the son of Edward Daniel of Durton, Lancashire, and great-nephew of Hugh Tootell, better known as Dodd the historian. He was educated first at Dame Alice's School, Fernyhalgh, and then at Douai, where he was ordained priest and made professor of philosophy (1778) and afterwards of theology. When the president, Edward Kitchen, alarmed by the French Revolution, resigned his office in 1792, Daniel was appointed president. When war was declared between England and France, the superiors and students of most of the British establishments took flight and succeeded in reaching England. The members of the English College, including Daniel, remained in the hope of saving the college.

About 9:00 on the night of 12 October 1793, a band of revolutionary soldiers surrounded and took possession of the college. Those students who had not already made their escape were removed to the Scottish College, where they were detained as prisoners. Daniel, the teachers, and students were confined first at Arras, and then at Doullens in Picardy. Over the next three month, fifteen managed to escape from the citadel, by descending at night a rope let down from the ramparts, and made it back to England. In November 1794, those remaining were returned to the Irish College at Douai and in February, 1795, were allowed to leave for England.

Daniel and about twenty-five professors and students arrived at Dover on 2 March 1795, along with Gregory Stapleton and sixty-four students from the English College at St. Omer. Arriving in London, a number of them called upon John Douglass, Vicar Apostolic of the London District. Soon afterwards Stapleton took his students to join the earlier refugees from St. Omer's at Old Hall Green.

As Douglass was unable to make a similar arrangement for the Douai students, they proceeded north to join their friends, many of whom resided in the Northern District. William Gibson, Vicar Apostolic of the Northern District, lodged them for a time in his house at Little Blake Street in York. According to Edwin Bonney, Daniel arrived at Crook Hall, and seems to have been formally installed as president. He resigned a few days later, "...by this act transmitting the succession of the Presidency from Douai to the new college." He was succeeded by Thomas Eyre, who had been president at Crook. However, Edwin Burton finds this difficult to reconcile with contemporary documents in the Westminster diocesan archives.

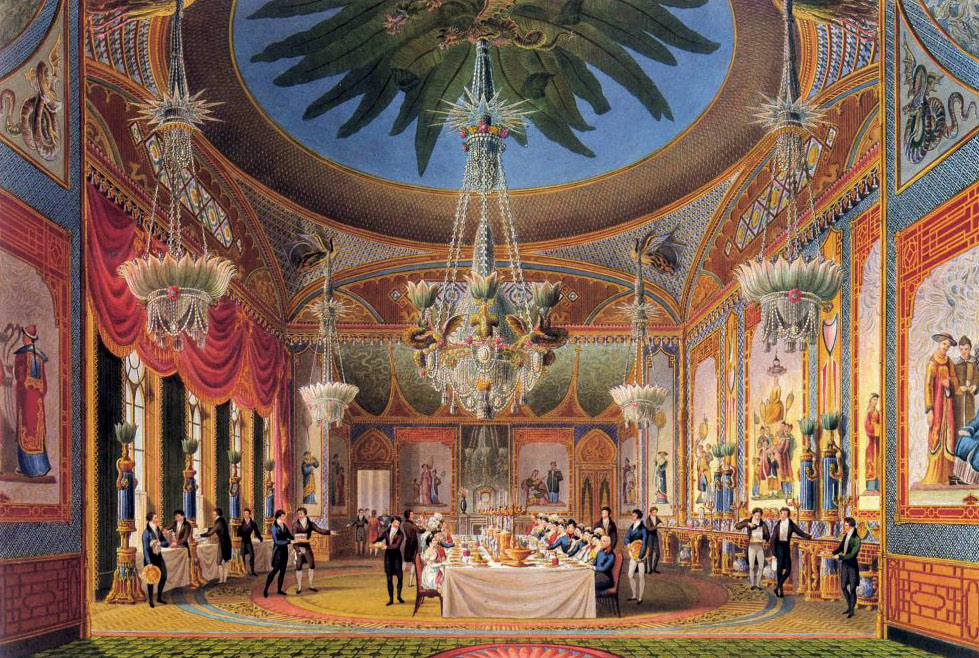
Brighton banqueting room

Daniel retired to Lancashire till 1802, when he went to Paris in order to recover the property of Douai College and other British establishments. After 1815 compensation amounting to half a million pounds was paid by the French Government, but the English Government confiscated this money, neither returning it to France nor allowing the English Catholics to receive it. Daniel was the last de facto president of Douai, though Francis Tuite was appointed titular president, to succeed him in prosecuting the claims.

In the February 1831 issue of the Catholic Magazine (vol i. pp. 52-58, 10-16) Daniel wrote the "Claim of the Rev. John Daniel", minutely tracing the history of the whole affair and citing authorities and documents, both English and French. Daniels explained that the claim had been denied by the British Commissioners and an appeal upheld by Lord Gifford, Lord Chief Justice of the Common Pleas and the Privy Council. However, Daniel points out that but for the fact that the claimants were Catholic, a bill of indemnity would have been passed and paid from the funds held. Antiquary Joseph Gillow says that while it was widely reported that the money toward furnishings at Windsor Castle, the older tradition that the Douai indemnity was used to complete the furnishings of George IV's Royal Pavilion at Brighton "is by no means unsupported by a certain amount of proof." Gifford's decision was released on 25 November 1825, and the Pavilion completed two years later.

John Daniel died in Paris on 3 October 1823.

== Works ==
Daniel wrote an Ecclesiastical History of the Britons and Saxons (London, 1815, 1824).
