= Henrietta Tower =

Henrietta Tower (Henriette, Enrichetta) (26 October 1856 – 3 April 1933) was born in Pottsville, Pennsylvania. While living in Rome, she and her husband, George Washington Wurts, created an art collection containing approximately 3,000 works that was donated on her death in 1933 to Benito Mussolini. The art collection remains in Rome, and their villa and gardens are open to the public.

== Early life ==
Henrietta Tower was the sixth of seven children of Charlemagne Tower, a lawyer, businessman, and graduate of Harvard University. On her father’s death in 1889, Tower inherited a vast fortune from his business ventures which included a coal mining operation in Pennsylvania and an iron production plant in Minnesota. This inheritance made her one of the wealthiest women in the United States at that time.

== Life in Rome and art collection ==
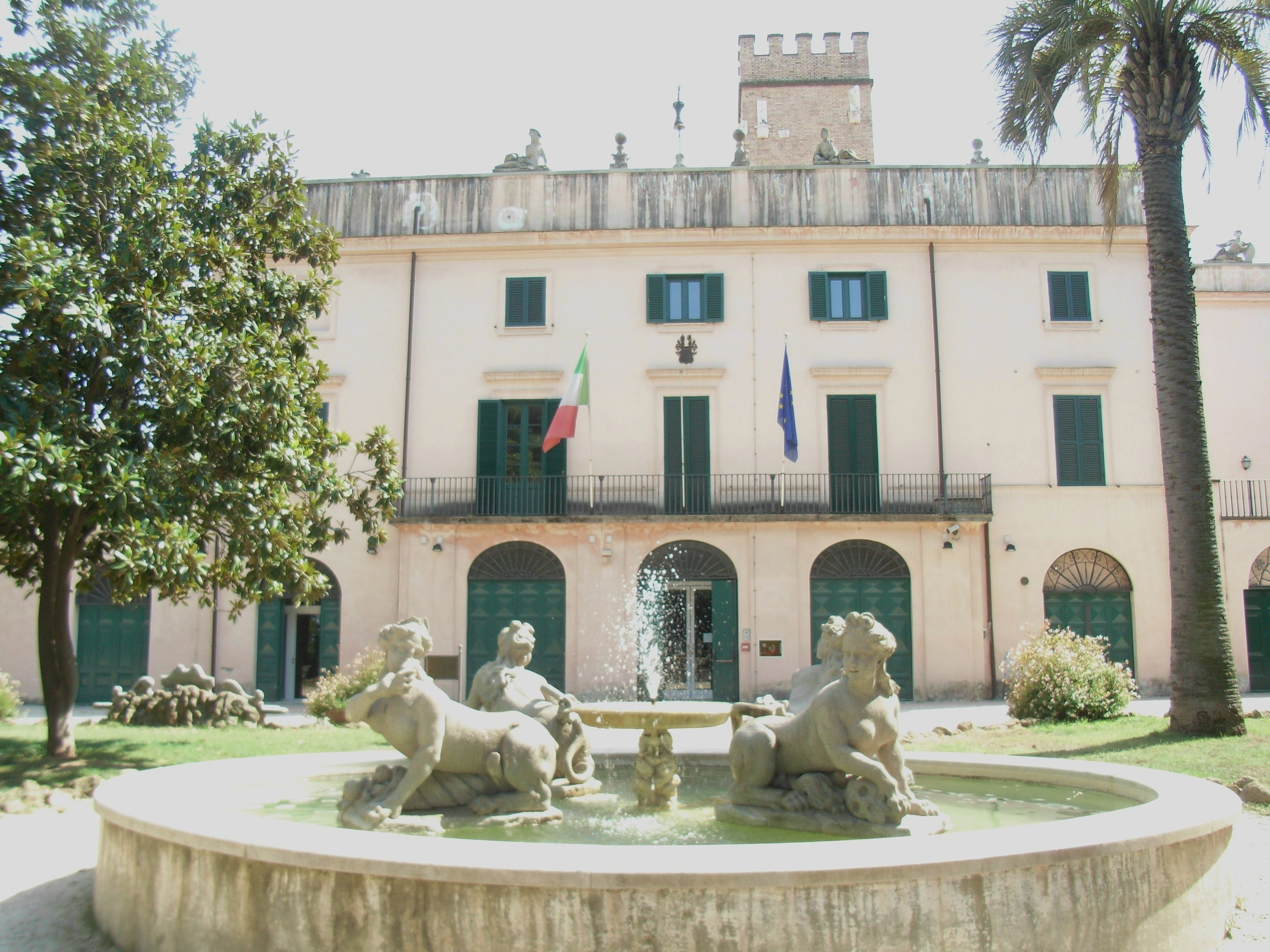
Villa Sciarra in Rome

Tower married George Washington Wurts in 1898. In 1902 the couple moved to Rome and bought a villa, known as the Villa Sciarra-Wurts, which they spent the rest of their lives renovating and decorating with a variety of art works. They frequently entertained the wealthy, ambassadors, and aristocratic members of society. After her husband died in 1928 Tower gave their villa to the city of Rome on the condition that the vast garden be turned into a public park and cultural center in honor of the German poet, Johann Wolfgang von Goethe. (Included with this was a gift of $50,000 to maintain the property.) The park so dedicated was opened in 1932 and a year later, in 1933, Tower died in Lucerne, Switzerland and is buried in the Protestant cemetery in Rome.

Through her will Tower bequeathed the vast art collection that she and her husband had expanded over several decades to Benito Mussolini, on the condition that it be kept in a museum. The collection was given to Rome's Museo nazionale del Palazzo di Venezia where it has remained since (although several works remain in the Villa Sciarra-Wurts). Included in the collection are over 3,000 items including: ceramics, textiles, tapestries, paintings (including works by Ottaviano Nelli, Vincenzo Pagani, John Russell, Paolo Veneziano, and Michael Wolgemut), about 80 wooden sculptures, various works from China and Japan, and a significant number of works from Russia including 33 late 19th-century women's hats.

Tower will also establish The Henrietta Tower Wurts Foundation in Philadelphia which in addition to funding Meals on Wheels also provides small grants to “organizations serving disadvantaged children and youth and/or the elderly”.

== See also ==
- Charlemagne Tower Jr.
