= Broughton High School, Lancashire =

Broughton High School

Location
- Woodplumpton Lane; Broughton; City of Preston, Lancashire, PR3 5JJ; England; 53.80755°N 2.72784°W

Information
- Type: Community school
- Motto: Achieving together
- Established: 1975
- Local authority: Lancashire
- Department for Education URN: 119759 Tables
- Ofsted: Reports
- Headteacher: David Botes
- Gender: Coeducational
- Age: 11 to 16
- Enrolment: 926 as of March 2026
- Language: English
- Colour: Green
- Website: http://www.broughtonhigh.co.uk

Broughton High School is a coeducational secondary school located in Broughton in the English county of Lancashire.

== History ==
Established in 1975, it is a community school administered by Lancashire County Council. The school was awarded specialist status in business and enterprise, and was renamed Broughton Business and Enterprise College for a time.

== Courses ==
Broughton High School offers GCSEs, BTECs, NVQs and City and Guilds courses as programmes of study for pupils. Some courses are offered in conjunction with Preston's College and Myerscough College.

== Motto ==
The schools motto is ‘achieving together’. The school as of March 2026 has 926 pupils.

== Notable former pupils ==
- Helen Clitheroe, middle- and long-distance runner
