= Holy Trinity Church, Hoghton =

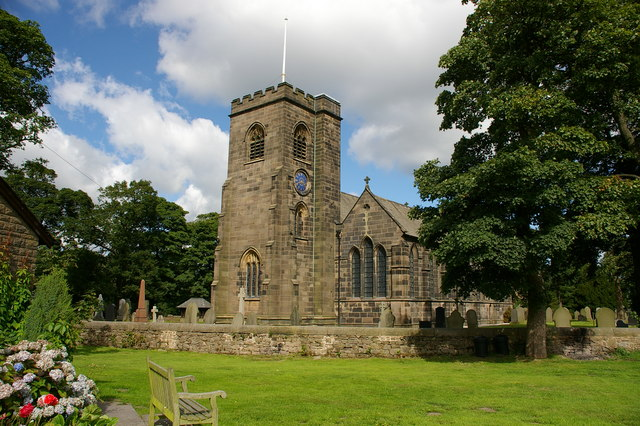
- Holy Trinity Church, Hoghton, from the southwest

- Location in the Borough of Chorley
- 53°43′41″N 2°35′06″W
- OS grid reference: SD 615 259
- Location: Hoghton, Lancashire
- Country: England
- Denomination: Anglican
- Website: Holy Trinity, Hoghton

History
- Status: Parish church

Architecture
- Functional status: Active
- Heritage designation: Grade II
- Designated: 30 January 1987
- Architect(s): Robert Roper; James Birtwhistle
- Architectural type: Church
- Style: Gothic Revival
- Groundbreaking: 1822
- Completed: c, 1887

Specifications
- Materials: Stone

Administration
- Province: York
- Diocese: Blackburn
- Archdeaconry: Blackburn
- Deanery: Leyland
- Parish: Hoghton

Clergy
- Priest: Revd Hannah Boyd

Holy Trinity Church is in the village of Hoghton, Lancashire, England. It is an active Anglican parish church in the deanery of Leyland, the archdeaconry of Blackburn, and the diocese of Blackburn. The church is recorded in the National Heritage List for England as a designated Grade II listed building. It is a Commissioners' church, having received a grant towards its construction from the Church Building Commission.

== History ==
Holy Trinity was built between 1822 and 1823, and was designed by Robert Roper. A grant of £2,037 (equivalent to £190,000 in 2025) was given towards its construction by the Church Building Commission. The church was almost completely rebuilt in about 1887 by James Bertwistle of Blackburn, who added the tower, chancel and south aisle.

== Architecture ==
=== Exterior ===
The church is constructed in ashlar stone. The architectural style is mainly Early English. Its plan consists of a five-bay nave, a six-bay south aisle, a two-bay chancel, and west tower. The tower is in three stages, with angle buttresses and a southeast stair turret. It has an arched north doorway, and a three-light west window with Perpendicular tracery. On the north and south sides, at a higher level, is a two-light window with a circular clock face above it. The bell openings have two lights, and are louvred. At the summit of the tower is an embattled parapet. Along the sides of the nave and the south aisle are lancet windows. The aisle also has a priest's door, coupled lancets in the east gable, and triple lancets in the west gable. The chancel has two-light windows on the sides, and a large five-light east window. All the gables contain a quatrefoil window towards the apex, and are surmounted by a stone cross.

=== Interior ===
The arcade between the nave and the aisle has four bays, and is carried on quatrefoil columns. The reredos is a memorial to the First World War. The font is octagonal and dates probably from the 1880s. In the east window is stained glass dating from about 1929 depicting the Te Deum. The baptistery contains glass by Shrigley and Hunt dating from the middle of the 20th century. The monuments include one to Thomas Swinburn, an early engineer of the Lancashire and Yorkshire Railway, who died in 1881. Elsewhere are memorials to members of the de Hoghton family of Hoghton Tower. The two-manual organ was built in 1868, and rebuilt in 1886 by Thorold and Smith. It was restored in 2004–05 by David Wells. There is a ring of eight bells, all cast in 1886 by Mears and Stainbank of the Whitechapel Bell Foundry.

== External features ==
The churchyard contains war graves of two British and one Australian soldier of World War I, and a British airman of World War II.

== See also ==
- List of Commissioners' churches in Northeast and Northwest England
- Listed buildings in Hoghton
- List of works by Robert Roper
