= Maria De Fleury =

Maria De Fleury (fl. 1773–1791) was a London-based Baptist poet, hymnist and polemicist descended from French Huguenots. Little is known of her private life. The dating of her birth at 1752-53 and her death at 1792 are conjectural.

== Life and work ==
De Fleury is thought to have been a schoolteacher before moving to 2 City Mews, White Cross Street, Islington, and then to nearby 31 Jewin Street, Cripplegate, in the City of London. However, there are signs in her writings that she felt defensive about her lack of formal education. Her earliest dated poem is an Epithalamium, written to mark her brother's wedding on 25 November 1773.

As a member of the strongly anti-Catholic Protestant Association, De Fleury actively defended Lord George Gordon, who had instigated it and was accused by Charles Wesley and others of inciting the riots over the restoration of civil rights to Catholics. Her pamphlet vindicating Gordon, entitled Unrighteous Abuse Detected and Chastised, appeared in 1781, as did her Poems, Occasioned by the Confinement and Acquittal of the Right Honourable Lord George Gordon, President of the Protestant Association. The pamphlet "depicts her enemies baying against Truth like village curs at the moon."

Despite being a Baptist, Fleury belonged to the Independent Meeting House of John Towers, originally a breakaway from a Presbyterian congregation. The meeting house was moved from Bartholomew Close to new premises in Jewin Street in 1784. Fleury was also on close terms with the Baptist minister and religious writer John Ryland. She went on to dedicate to Gordon a masque-like work in blank verse entitled Henry, or the Trump of Grace (1782), in which Henry's guardian angels, Religion and Grace, stave off the attacks of Syren. This went into three editions.

== God and liberty ==
Many of De Fleury's hymns – some still sung today – appeared first in her volume Hymns for Believers' Baptism (1786). Her Divine Poems and Essays were collected and published in 1791. Included was a work in couplets entitled "British Liberty Established and Gallic Liberty Restored, or The Triumph of Freedom", where she compares herself to Deborah celebrating Jael and honours such figures and events in history as Alfred, Magna Carta, Oliver Cromwell, King George III and the French Revolution. It emphasizes the Amazonian role played by women in the course of history and presages Christ's reign on Earth.

De Fleury, encouraged by John Ryland, became involved again as a controversialist in a "pamphlet war" with the preacher William Huntington and his ostensible Antinomianism. Her Letter of November 1787 elicited from him abuse from the pulpit, and from his daughter a 1788 pamphlet entitled Mother Abbess denying the place of women in the area of public debate. Her Answer (1788) stressed that women's liberty of speech was God-given. Her Antinomianism Unmasked and Refuted (1791) again drew a printed retort from Huntington (The Broken Cistern) and another series of responses, De Fleury's Falsehood Examined on the Bar of Truth and Huntingdon's An Answer to Fools.

After 1791 De Fleury disappears from history, although The Missionary Magazine published an otherwise unattested poem credited to her in 1802.
