= Museo nazionale del Palazzo di Venezia =

Art museum in Rome

Museo Nazionale del Palazzo di Venezia
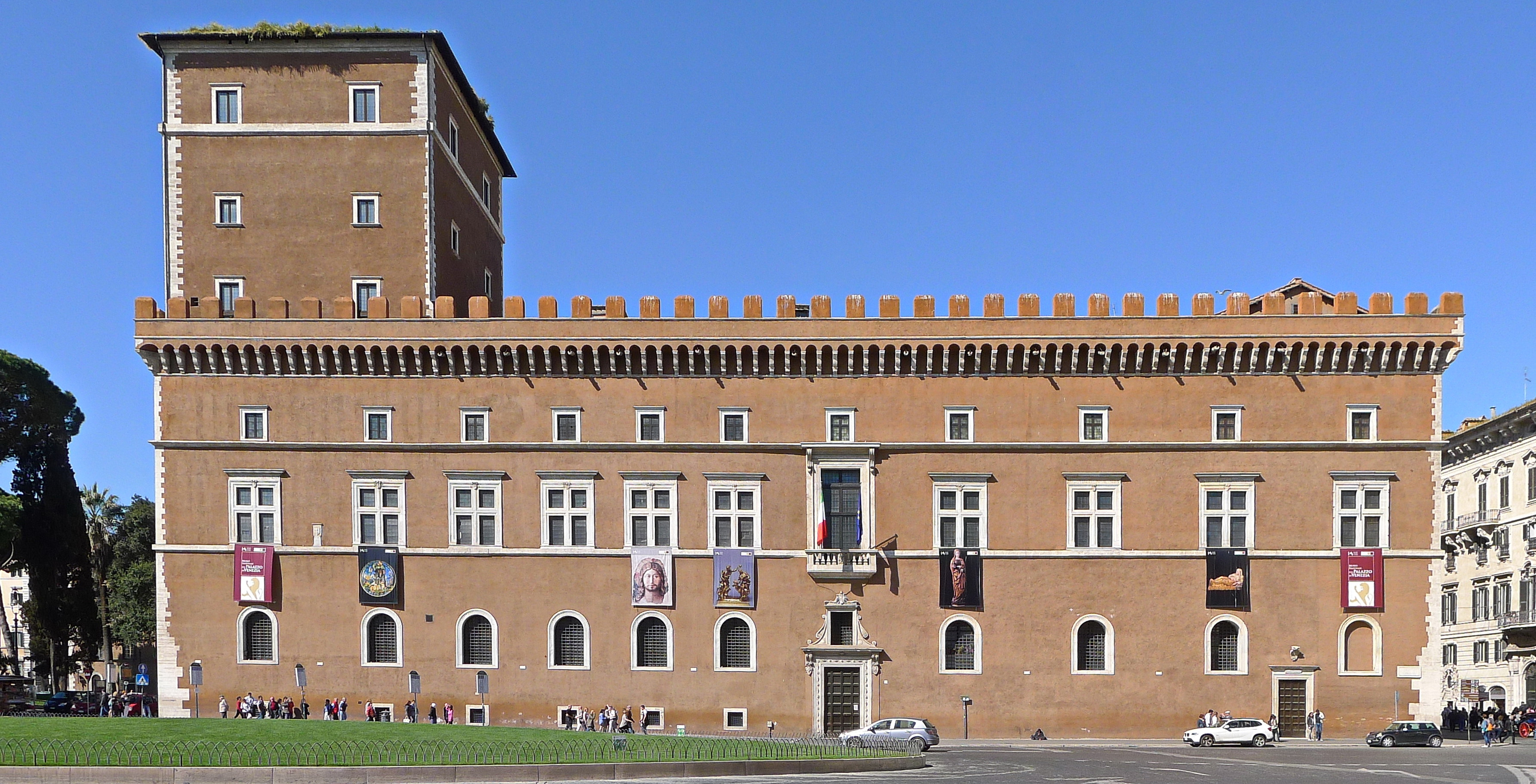
- Palazzo Venezia.
- Established: 1921
- Dissolved: 1929; reopened in 1943
- Location: Rome, Italy, Via del Plebiscito 118
- Coordinates: 41.8963°N 12.4817°E
- Type: Art museum
- Visitors: 58,754
- Director: Edith Gabrielli
- Owner: (Italy) Italian Republic - Ministry of Culture
- Website: vive.cultura.gov.it

The Museo Nazionale del Palazzo di Venezia ("National Museum of the Palazzo di Venezia") is a state museum in Rome, Italy, housed in the palace of the same name together with the important Library of Archaeology and Art History.

Since 2020, together with the Vittoriano, it has been managed by the VIVE Institute, one of the eleven institutes of significant general interest of the Italian Ministry of Culture.

== Collections ==
The Museum preserves paintings by artists such as Fra Angelico, Giorgione (Double portrait, about 1502), Giotto, Benozzo Gozzoli, Guercino, Carlo Maratta, Pisanello (Head of a woman), Guido Reni, Giorgio Vasari, Alessandro Algardi, Gian Lorenzo Bernini, as well as pastels, sculptures, bronzes, majolica, terracotta, western and oriental porcelain, medals, seals, furniture, weapons, ivories, silver, glass, enamels, fabrics and tapestries. It also preserves approximately 3,000 works from the Wurts Collection, which was formed by George Washington Wurts and Henrietta Tower and bequeathed to the Italian state on her death in 1933.

The external loggia (Garden of Paul II) houses a lapidarium.

The museum also hosts temporary exhibitions.

== Image gallery ==
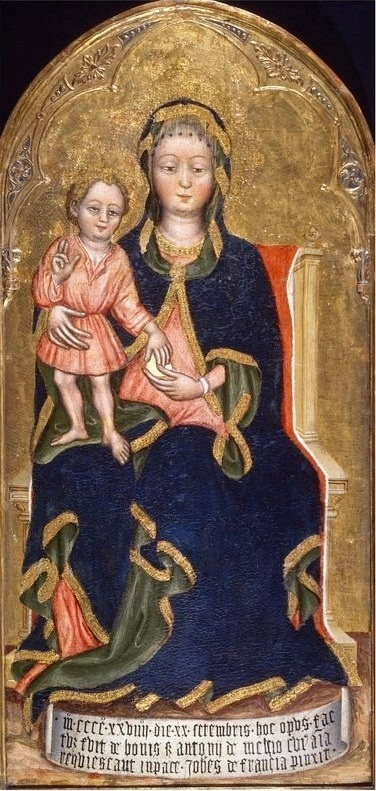
Giovanni Charlier, Madonna with Child, 1429

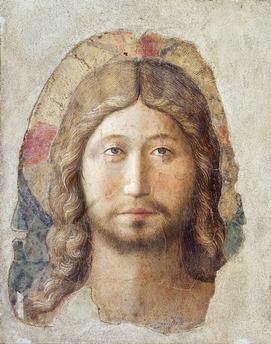
Benozzo Gozzoli, The Redeemer (15th century)

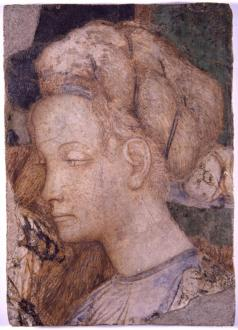
Pisanello, Portrait of a woman (1430s)

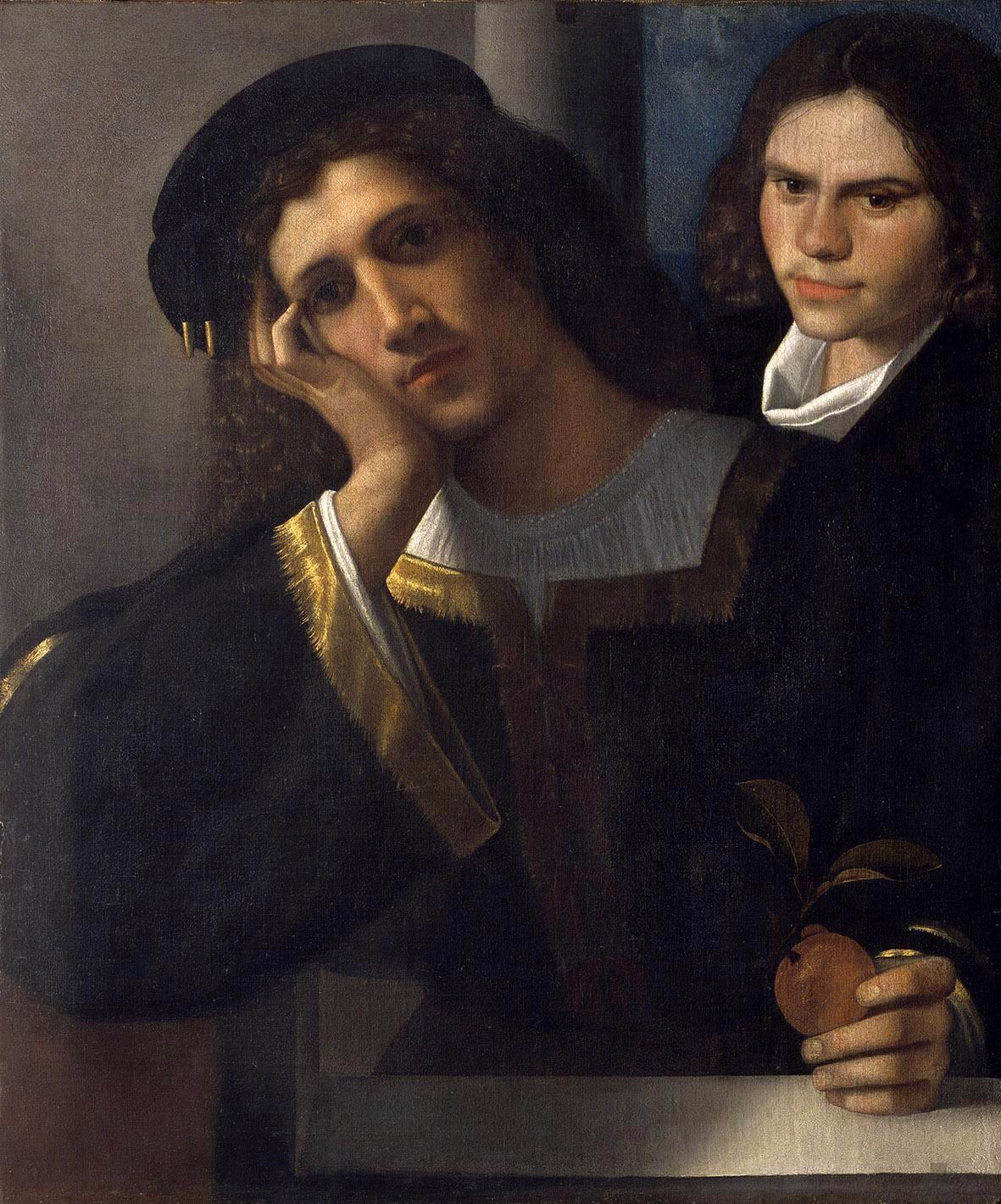
Giorgione, Double portrait (ca. 1502)

== Transports ==
- Metro stop (Colosseo, line B)
