= Charlemagne Tower =

American lawyer (1809–1889)

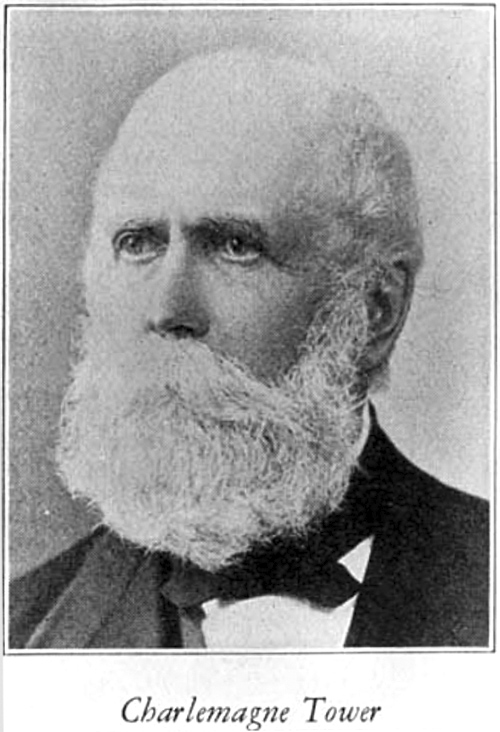

Charlemagne Tower (April 18, 1809 – July 25, 1889) was an American lawyer and businessman active in acquiring land in the Schuylkill Valley in Pennsylvania and serving as an officer for coal and railroad companies. He organized and led a company of Union soldiers from Pottsville in a 3-month enlistment during the American Civil War when he was commissioned as captain.

After the war, with sell-off of lands by the Northern Pacific Railroad, he acquired large tracts in the upper Midwest and Northwest.

== Early life and start of law career ==
Charlemagne Tower was born on April 18, 1809, in Paris, Oneida County, New York, the eldest of the eight children of Reuben Tower, a New York State Legislator, and Deborah Taylor Pierce. Tower took his early schooling at the Oxford Academy, and then at the Clinton and Utica Academies. In 1824, at the age of 14, Tower taught school in Oneida County. The next year, he was made an assistant teacher at the Utica Academy. Tower entered Harvard in 1827, and graduated in 1830.

In the interim, Reuben Tower relocated his family to Waterville, New York, purchasing a property that still stands at the intersection of West Main St (NY 12) and Tower St. It was listed on the National Register of Historic Places in 1977 as the Tower Homestead and Masonic Temple.

Upon graduation, Tower became a legal apprentice of Harmanus Bleecker of Albany. He returned to Waterville in 1832 upon the death of his father, who had moved to St. Augustine, Florida, for health reasons. After settling his father's estate, Tower started working with the Graham Law Office of New York City. After being admitted to the bar in 1836, he returned to Waterville and started his own practice in a former small schoolhouse that is part of the Tower homestead.

== Activities in Pennsylvania ==
In 1846, Tower relocated to Orwigsburg, Schuylkill County, Pennsylvania, in order to work with the legal issues regarding land claims to large coal and mineral deposits in that area. While there, he married Amelia Malvina Bartle on June 14, 1847. They had seven children: Charlemagne Jr. (Born April 17, 1848, in Philadelphia), Sara Louisa (Born August 6, 1849, in Orwigsburg), Deborah Taylor (Born February 4, 1851, in Orwigsburg), Emma (Born June 15, 1852, in Pottsville), Elizabeth (Born March 2, 1854, in Pottsville, and died a year and a half later), Henrietta (Born October 26, 1856, in Pottsville), and Grace Williams (Born May 15, 1859, in Pottsville).

Tower re-established his Pennsylvania practice in Pottsville in 1850 when it was made the Schuylkill County seat. The Towers made their home at the corner of South 4th and Mahantongo streets, one block from the Yuengling Brewery. He served as counsel in many land-ownership disputes and earned both a high reputation and great wealth. The most famous of these cases was the Munson–Williams affair, which would take nearly twenty-five years to complete.

=== Munson–Williams case ===
Not long after Tower came to Pottsville, he began furiously purchasing and clearing liens to lands containing large anthracite deposits in and around Schuylkill County. This was part of an elaborate land-grab scheme devised by Tower and his partner, Alfred Munson of Utica, New York.

The plan called for Tower to use his legal acumen to clear all the liens and opposing claims to the 8,000-acre (32 km^{2}) Munson–Williams claim, and to all the land around it. In short, the partners hoped to create a single landed estate, which would have measured 65 by 4 1/2 miles (104.6 by 7.2 km) at its widest point in southwest Schuylkill County. In return, Tower was to receive ownership and title to one-half of all the land acquired once all the cost to Munson had been settled, or until Tower paid him half the value of the total land purchase.

At the time, the Schuylkill Valley was a hotly contested territory, with constant conflicts over titles, some dating to before the American Revolution and British colonial rule, and rights. Had any of their competitors became aware of what Tower and Munson were up to, they may well have bought up the land the pair were after, and charged exorbitant prices for it, or worse, refused to sell it at all. The partners operated secretly to protect their interests. Tower would make the purchases, and convey the titles to legal dummies to hide the ownership of the land. By 1858 Tower and Munson had acquired eleven thousand acres (45 km^{2}). By now, Munson and Tower's plan was well out of the bag, and anyone who had even a partial claim to any of the lands began to litigate. Only Tower's considerable skill as a lawyer kept the whole enterprise from falling apart.

In 1867, Tower decided to start selling the lands, wanting to realize his interest in them. Because of the clouded title issues, he could not find a buyer at the time. Deciding instead to develop the property for coal mining, in March 1868 he leased 1,503 acres (6.08 km^{2}) to two independent coal companies. It was a 15-year term, with a rental of $.30 for each ton of coal mined. The companies placed two collieries on the land, the Tower and the Brookside. Near the collieries, Tower began to develop a small town, which was named Tower City when first surveyed. Tower laid out the town, and he also rented lots to settlers.

Around this time, Franklin Gowen, President of the Reading Railroad, had begun purchasing coal lands along the Railroad's right-of-way to organize an anthracite coal monopoly. When Gowen had accumulated 70,000 acres (280 km^{2}), Tower accepted his offer of purchase for his lands. Tower asked for and received $3 million from Gowen, for which Tower realized a profit of $1.5 million as per the original contract with the Munson family. (Alfred Munson died in May 1854.)

=== Civil War ===
Within ten days of the outbreak of hostilities at Fort Sumter, South Carolina, on April 12, 1861, Tower recruited some 270 Schuylkill County men to enter the Union Army under a three-month enlistment agreement. This unit was referred to as the "Tower Guards", and they were created as Company H of the 6th Pennsylvania Regiment; this was attached to a brigade commanded by Major General Robert Patterson. Commissioned as the unit captain, he provided uniforms and arms for the troops at his own expense.

This unit most notably served in the engagement at Falling Waters in July 1861. This battle is considered a Union victory, but the failure of Patterson to pursue Confederate movements into the Shenandoah Valley allowed them to regroup and contributed to the later Union defeat at the First Battle of Bull Run.

When the unit was mustered out of service later in July of that same year, the members of Tower's unit presented him with a ceremonial sword in "their respect for him as a man and soldier, and their esteem for him as a friend."

On April 18, 1863, he was appointed Provost Marshal for Schuylkill County and assumed the duty of conscripting men needed for military service. This was an unpopular chore and he and his assistants and their families received numerous threats upon their lives. The draft was so vigorously resisted by the farmers and miners in Schuylkill County that Tower was assigned two companies of militia to assist him in enforcing conscription. The miners of the Heckscherville Valley, gathered a mob of about 3,000 people to march on Tower's home but he retaliated immediately by marching his armed men into their midst, seizing those who had been drafted, and swearing them into military service. During his tenure as Provost Marshal he conscripted his full quota of 20,000 men. which earned him a citation from President Lincoln.

Tower played a role in the characterization of Irish Catholic Miners as "Molly Maguires", a term first used by Benjamin Bannan of the Pottsville Miner's Journal and now applied to the draft resisters. Tower was also a friend with mine owners, who conflated labor activism with treason, and were able to break up groups organizing in the mines by shipping them out to war, and by smearing them as members of the "Bucks"ots” or Molly Maguires out to subvert the Union. At Tower's suggestion, the mine operators in Cass Township filed affidavits attesting to intimidation by groups of miners to stop work or drive off obnoxious bosses and enforce a closed shop, which is presented as an antiwar conspiracy.

Resistance to the draft in Schuylkill County was not limited to the Irish mine workers but included Welsh workers as well as a large contingent of German farmers. And the Schuylkill County sheriff had sided with the miners by arresting federal draft officers who had arrested draft resisters in the county.

Troops remained in Schuylkill County throughout the war. Even after the draft was completed in October 1863, Tower remained as the Provost Marshal until April 1864. He continued to employ repressive tactics against the miners. With the end of the draft Tower's activities were directed against labor activism, which was attacked as disloyalty against the state.

In January 1864, a military commission was convened to try the Buckshots arrested in the anthracite coal fields and in March about 20 "Buckshots" who had been convicted for trying to block the implementation of the draft in Schuylkill County, were imprisoned at Fort Mifflin in Philadelphia.

After the war he joined the Military Order of the Loyal Legion of the United States as a First Class Companion of the Pennsylvania Commandery.

=== Postwar activities ===
After Tower's active Civil War service (yet still in the midst of settling the Munson–Williams case), he was named the U.S. Provost Marshal for Pennsylvania's 10th Congressional District. He served from April 1863 through May 1864. He continued his Pottsville law practice until moving to Philadelphia in 1875.

At this time, he engaged in several business ventures, such as proprietorship of the Honeybrook Coal Company, and membership of the board of directors of the Northern Pacific Railway. Financial difficulties in the early 1870s forced the Northern Pacific to sell off much of its lands in the upper Midwest. Tower acquired large tracts of land from the sales in Minnesota, North Dakota, and Washington.

== Activities in the Midwest ==
=== Tower City, North Dakota ===
In 1878, George Ellsbury migrated to North Dakota and became interested in Tower's property in Cass and Barnes counties. Having become a real estate agent and believing that the area then known as Spring Tank would be a prime setting for a new town, Ellsbury contacted Tower about purchasing the site. Tower hired Ellsbury as his land agent for this area, offering him a 5% commission on all land sold to incoming farmers, and a pass for unlimited travel on the Northern Pacific. Ellsbury, a former artist for Harper's Weekly and Leslie's Illustrated Magazine, turned real estate agent, was typical of the land speculators who moved to the west.

Ellisbury acquired Spring Tank by January 1879 and laid out the town that came to be known as Tower City after his benefactor. Tower had asked Ellsbury to name the town after himself, but the land agent thought Tower's name had more recognition and prestige because of his large landholdings.

==== Tower University ====
Ellsbury failed to heighten the prominence of Tower City, losing the competition for capital of the Dakota Territory, and a new county and county seat, and he decided to open a new university, to be named for Tower. Meeting with Baptist leaders who were looking to establish a college in the Dakotas, Ellsbury promised them a $100,000 contribution from Charlemagne Tower if they settled in Tower City. They agreed, and construction began on buildings in 1884.

When Tower declined to contribute in the amount promised, construction of the new college ceased immediately. He donated $4,500 in cash and a 1,500-volume library. Local residents raised another $5000, and the first classes began in a downtown hotel. Thirty students registered that first year of 1886. The next year, enrollment dropped to 20, so the officers closed the college.

=== Vermilion Range ===
In 1865, a Minnesota state geologist discovered gold and silver-bearing quartz near Lake Vermilion in northern Minnesota. This touched off a short-lived gold rush to the area called the Vermilion Range, a stretch of land between Lake Vermilion and an area just to the east of Shagawa Lake. While miners prospecting for gold were striking out, others were discovering that the area was rich in iron ore. George C. Stone, a banker from Duluth, heard of large ore deposits in the Mesabi Range, which lies west of the Vermilion. In 1873, he met with Tower in his Philadelphia office to discuss the property.

Tower agreed to allow a prospecting expedition on the Mesabi, and sent his son-in-law, R.H. Lee, and Professor Albert Huntington Chester of Hamilton College, along with Stone. None was satisfied with the results. In 1874, the party crossed into the Vermilion range and discovered a large outcropping of iron ore. Satisfied that there was a large vein of ore available in that area, they reported back to Tower. At that time, Tower elected not to proceed with mining the area due to the enormous expense of prospecting, the logistical problems of mining the area and transporting the ore, and financial concerns over the recent Panic of 1873.

Tower ordered prospecting in the Vermilion resumed in 1880. Along with Stone and Lee, Tower sent his son, Charlemagne Tower Jr., to assist. A railroad was surveyed from the mines to the town of Two Harbors on Lake Superior, and Tower had it constructed in 1883. By 1884, the mine had proved to be successful, and the business incorporated under the name of Minnesota Iron Company. The ore was mined on site, then loaded to the railroad and delivered to Two Harbors, where it was loaded on ships for iron and steel factories in Ohio. A settlement near the mines was named Tower in the landowner's honor.

By 1887, iron ore was discovered in lands north of the town of Tower, which were purchased by a syndicate of East Coast financiers. This syndicate, which included H.H. Porter of the Union Steel Works and the Rockefeller family, wanted to purchase Tower's railroad in order to extend it to their lands. Tower initially refused. The syndicate implied that they would construct a second railroad alongside that of Tower and compete directly. Tower had no control over the shipping lines that carried his ore from Two Harbors to points east, and many of these companies were under the control of the same East Coast iron and steel magnates who were involved in the Minnesota syndicate. Faced with these challenges, Tower divided his properties into two parts, the mine and the railroad. He said that any potential buyers had to purchase both. In late 1887, Tower sold his Minnesota Iron Company holdings to the syndicate, retaining a small interest in the subsequent company, called the Minnesota Mining and Railroad Syndicate.

== Death ==
After retirement, Tower returned to his country residence in Waterville, New York, where he died on July 25, 1889. His death was, as reported in his obituary, attributed to a "paralysis".

== Legacy ==
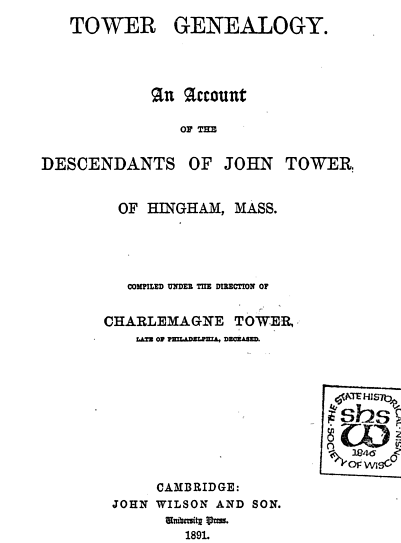
The Tower Genealogy, by Charlemagne Tower, published posthumously in 1891

Charlemagne Tower is credited with creating the mining industry in Minnesota as well as attracting settlers to the area. He was deeply involved in the mining industry in Pennsylvania and was part of the ascension of the Reading Railroad. Towns in three states are named after him. He served on the board of overseers for Harvard University and was involved in many business ventures, many of them successful.

Tower was also a collector of rare and valuable books. His particular interest was in American colonial laws. At the time of his death, he had the most complete collection of these books in the world. After his death, the Tower family bequeathed this collection to the Historical Society of Pennsylvania.

Tower had a deep interest in the genealogy of his family, going back to their Massachusetts Puritan roots. He amassed a large amount of information on the Tower family of Hingham, Massachusetts, and Hingham, England, and had it published. The resulting book, Tower Genealogy: An Account Of The Descendants Of John Tower Of Hingham, Mass., was released in 1891 after Tower's death.

Tower's son, Charlemagne Tower Jr., was appointed as Minister to Austria-Hungary for President William McKinley. He next served as Ambassador to the Russian Empire.

== Works ==
- Tower, Charlemagne. The Charlemagne Tower Collection of American Colonial Laws, Littleton, CO: F.B. Rothman, 1990, 1890.
