= Haighton =

Civil parish in Lancashire, England

Coordinates: 53.809°N 2.659°W

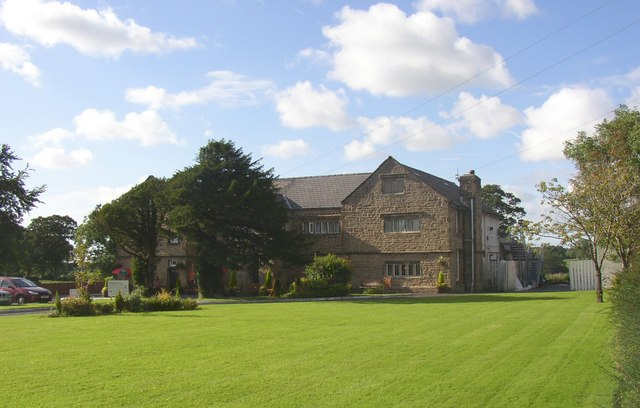
- Haighton Manor

- Shown within the City of Preston district Location within Lancashire
- Population: 206 (2021)
- OS grid reference: SD566349
- Civil parish: Haighton
- District: Preston
- Shire county: Lancashire
- Region: North West
- Country: England
- Sovereign state: United Kingdom
- Post town: PRESTON
- Postcode district: PR2
- Dialling code: 01772
- Police: Lancashire
- Fire: Lancashire
- Ambulance: North West
- UK Parliament: Ribble Valley

Civil parishes in the City of Preston
- Barton
- Broughton
- Goosnargh
- Grimsargh
- Haighton
- Ingol & Tanterton
- Lea
- Whittingham
- Woodplumpton

Haighton is a civil parish in the City of Preston, Lancashire, England. It is a rural area north east of the urban city of Preston, beyond Fulwood and Brookfield.

== Geography ==
Haighton also contains the hamlets of Haighton Green and Haighton Top. It is separated from the city by the M6 motorway, with junction 31A on the boundary with Brookfield.

== Community ==
The area was intended to become a residential suburb as part of the Central Lancashire New Town, with population increasing to 29,100 by 2001 however it never occurred and the area has remained rural. It has a population of 197, increasing to 202 at the 2011 Census. It slightly increased again in the 2021 census to 206.

== Economy ==
The listed building of Haighton Manor has operated as a country pub and restaurant since the early 1970s, undergoing substantial renovation in the mid-2010s and now operated by Brunning and Price.

== History ==
The parish was part of Preston Rural District throughout its existence from 1894 to 1974. In 1974 the parish became part of the Borough of Preston, which became a city in 2002.

== See also ==
- Listed buildings in Haighton
