= John Towers (minister) =

John Towers (c. 1747–1804) was an English Independent minister.

== Life ==
Towers was born in Southwark in about 1747. His father was a secondhand bookseller, and his elder brother, about ten years his senior, was Joseph Towers, later well known as a biographer.

John went to sea as a lad, and was afterwards apprenticed to a London packer. He taught himself Greek and Hebrew, and began to preach as an independent. A secession from Jewin Street independent congregation chose him as pastor, and leased the Presbyterian meeting-house in Bartholomew Close, where he was ordained in 1769. For some years he conducted a day school. A new meeting-house was built for him in the Barbican in 1784, and his ministry was successful. Among those who frequented it was the Baptist polemicist, poet and hymnist Maria De Fleury. He died on 9 July 1804, and was buried on 17 July in Bunhill Fields. He was twice married.

He published Polygamy Unscriptural (1780) (in response to Martin Madan), and sermons.
