= Benjamin Bannan =

Journalist and political economist

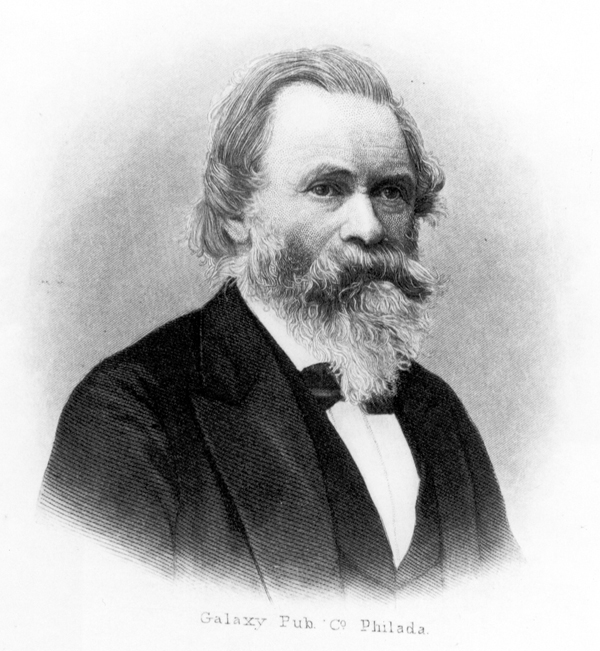
Benjamin Bannan

Benjamin Bannan (1807–1875) of Pottsville, Pennsylvania was a journalist and political economist. Bannan is best known for his work as editor of the Miners' Journal. The Miners' Journal reflected Bannan's belief in the Whig and then Republican ideology with which he closely identified. Bannan's connection to the anthracite Coal Region of Pennsylvania affected his political affiliation and career, as he advocated tariff protection for US industry and internal improvements.

== Early life ==
Benjamin Bannan was born into a farming family. When Bannan was eight years old, his father died, leaving his family to tend to the farm. Bannan only attended school for two years.

Bannan was inspired to become a printer and editor after reading the Village Record, which his teacher subscribed to. At the age of 15, he learned the printing business at the Berks and Schuylkill Journal. With time, Bannan was asked to become a partner and associate in the business. Eventually, he traveled to Pottsville in April 1829 where he purchased the Miners' Journal, which he owned for over forty years.

== Political career ==
Though not a politician himself, Benjamin Bannan became a spokesman for the Whig party in Schuylkill County. After the collapse of the party, he continued to go against the Democrats and thus identified as Republican. To align with his political affiliation, Bannan ran the Miners' Journal as a "leading Whig, nativist, and Republican newspaper". Bannan was also heavily influenced by the writings of economist Henry C. Carey.

Bannan was an advocate of what historian Eric Foner has dubbed the "free labor ideology" of the nineteenth century. The ideology was built upon the belief that social mobility was an inherent aspect of economic expansion. Labor, then, "embraced all producers of wealth", an economy centered on independent farms and small shops, rather than factories. In this ideology, capitalism and labor worked in harmony and were not opposing factors. The Miners' Journal was a play on the "free labor" ideology: the journal was for the small operating class, not the mine workers.

To Bannan, the ideal society had an independent middle class made up small entrepreneurial businesses. In the anthracite region he lived in, he saw this as coal operators. Bannan saw the possibility for upward mobility by starting as a laborer, moving to a miner and finally taking the next step to a property holder.

== Bannan and Irish immigrants ==
Bannan held a strong aversion to Irish Catholic immigrants who generally held the laborer jobs, tended to support the Democratic Party, and consumed alcohol, which offended the teetotaler.

In 1857, Bannan mentioned the Molly Maguires in an issue of the Miners' Journal, in which Bannan linked the group to violence in the area. It is among the first known public references to the secretive group in the US. Bannan made the argument that if more immigrants came, society would be threatened. Though Bannan made the claim, there were no proven accounts of violence from the Molly Maguire until 1862

== Bannan in the Civil War ==
Bannan also played a peculiar role during the Civil War anti-draft riots of 1862. He had been named as commissioner of the draft for Schuylkill County. A large portion of Irish Catholic miners (especially in Cass Township) had been named for fulfilling the quota of the draft by Bannan. This led to an altercation in which most of these miners not only refused to respond to the call of the State to go to Harrisburg by train on the designated date, but to riot by excluding the willing conscripts from the train. Secretary of War Edwin Stanton directed troops dispatched to Schuylkill County to enforce the draft. However, Pennsylvania Congressman Alexander McClure, contacted President Lincoln, who was only interested in seeing the law executed, or "at least to appear to have been executed", to which the President, according to General Townshend who was commanding the troops sent to Schuylkill County, added: "I think McClure will understand."

Bannan consulted with McClure and told him that the draft could not be executed in Cass Township without a bloody conflict with the Irish Catholic miners who he told McClure were under the influence of Molly Maguires. Bannan told McClure there was no method by which there could be given the appearance of executing the law. McClure told him that in several districts in the Commonwealth had shown that their quota had been entirely filled by volunteers, some of whom had enlisted in county towns or in the cities and had not been properly credited to the district as the law required. They agreed that only in that way could the Cass Township problem be solved if it were practicable. Bannan then returned with a large number of affidavits "proving" that the quota of Cass Township had been filled by volunteers, chiefly by men connected with the mines who had enlisted from the towns or cities where companies or regiments were being formed.

== Other contributions ==
Bannan was an early advocate of a national currency. Additionally, Bannan campaigned for tariff protection for US manufacturers.

== Coal, Iron, and Oil ==
In addition to Bannan's newspaper publication of the Miners' Journal and contributions to government policies, Bannan co-authored Coal, Iron, and Oil with Samuel Harries Daddow. The book deals with mineral resources and the manufacturing industry. Coal, Iron, and Oil is said to have been one of the most expensive single volume book published at the time.
