= Alice Harrison (schoolteacher) =

British schoolmistress

Dame Alice
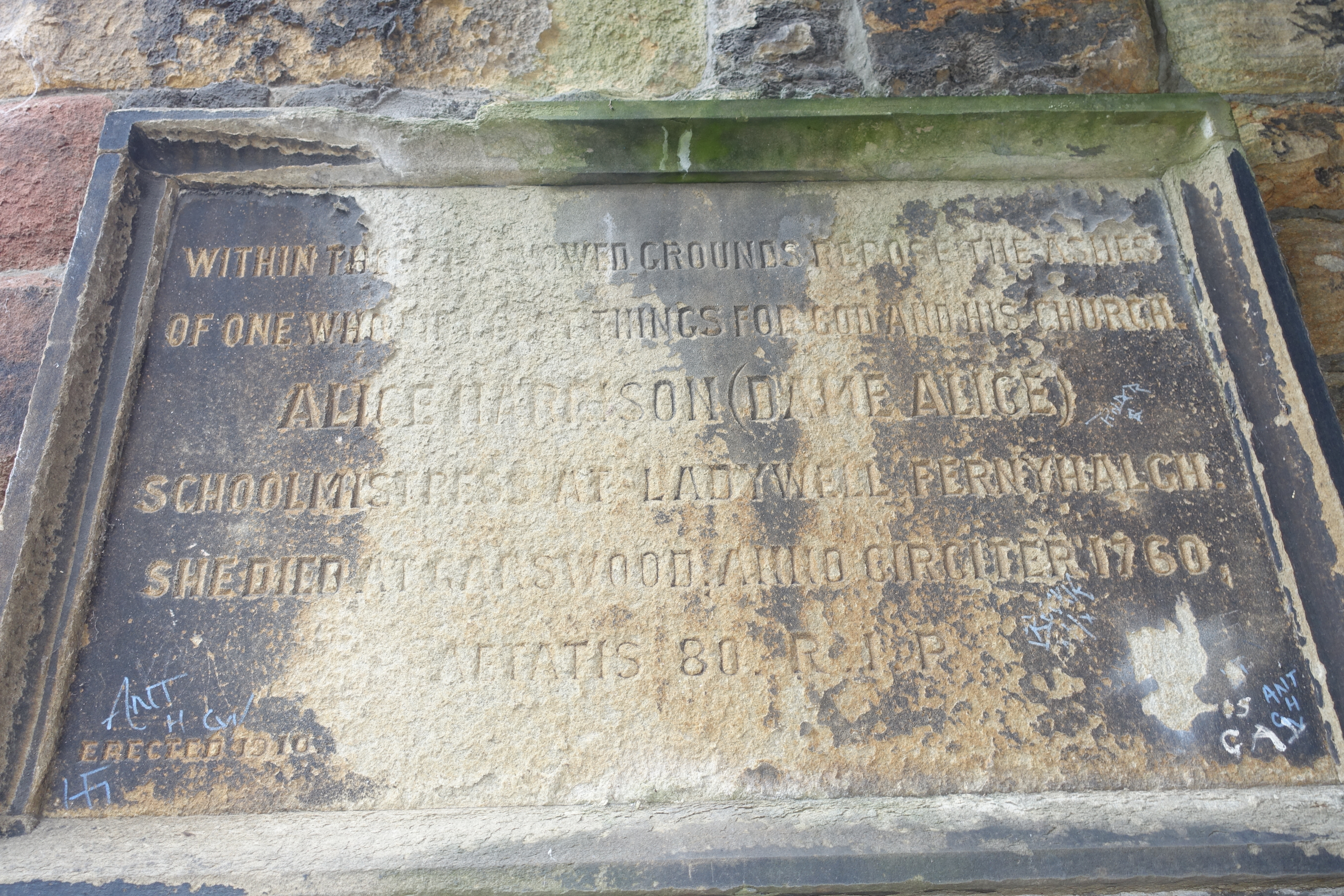
- her memorial
- Born: Alice Harrison; 1680; Fulwood Row near Preston
- Died: 1765 (aged 84–85); Garswood Hall
- Known for: running a Catholic Dame School

Alice Harrison (1680 – 1765) was a British schoolmistress known for founding an influential Catholic school in Lancashire.

== Life ==
Harrison was born in Fulwood Row near Preston. She became a Catholic despite her Protestant parents' objections. She was inspired by the local Catholic priest, Edward Melling, who encouraged her to start a local school. The school accepted children of any denomination but was focused on a Catholic education, even though it was illegal to be a Catholic teacher. Her pupils were taken daily to St Mary's Church in Fernyhalgh. Her students paid a shilling and sixpence every three months and many would board locally at a charge of five pounds per annum. Some of the students grew to be leading Catholics and were sent abroad for further study. Her alumni included the writer Alban Butler, Thomas Southworth (1749–1816), president of Sedgley Park; John Daniel who was the last president of the English College, Douai, and John Gillow President of Ushaw College.

The person who took on the leadership of her school after she retired in 1760 was the poet Peter Newby who was also an ex pupil of hers and of Douai College. She spent about five years in retirement in the care of the Gerard family.

Harrison died in Garswood Hall. Later a plaque was placed in Windleshaw Abbey. The plaque reads “WITHIN THESE HALLOWED GROUNDS REPOSE THE ASHES OF ONE WHO DID GREAT THINGS FOR GOD AND HIS CHURCH. ALICE HARRISON (DAME ALICE) SCHOOL MISTRESS AT LADYWELL, FERNYHALGH. SHE DIED AT GARSWOOD, ANNO CIRCITER 1760, AETATIS 80, R.I.P.
