= Joseph Towers =

English Dissenter and biographer

Joseph Towers (31 March 1737 – 20 May 1799) was an English Dissenter and biographer.

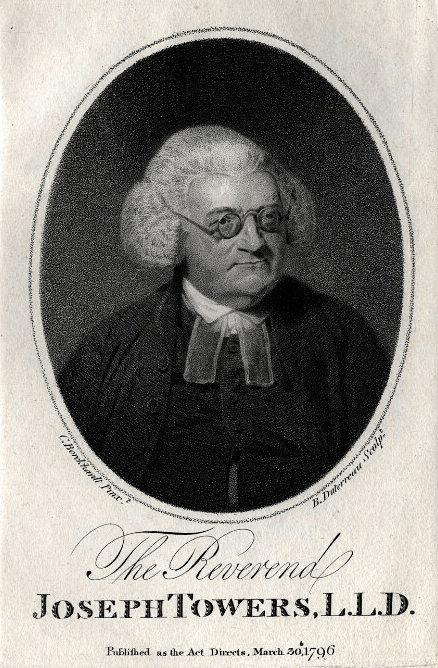
Joseph Towers, (1737-1799), of Southwark, London, Dissenter and biographer.

== Life and work ==
He was born in Southwark on 31 March 1737. His father was a secondhand bookseller, and at the age of 12 he was employed as a stationer's errand boy. In 1754 he was apprenticed to Robert Goadby of Sherborne, Dorset, a Whig supporter, and influential through his newspaper, the Sherborne Mercury. At Sherborne Towers learned Latin and Greek, and became a supporter of Goadby's Arian theology.

Coming to London in 1764, he worked as a journeyman printer, began to write political pamphlets, and set up a bookseller's shop in Fore Street about 1765. Goadby employed him as editor of the British Biography (from the date of John Wycliffe), and the first seven volumes, were compiled by him between 1766 and 1772, on the basis of the Biographia Britannica (1747–1766) but containing much original work, the fruit of research at the British Museum.

In 1774 he gave up business, was ordained as a Dissenting minister, and became pastor of the Presbyterian congregation in Southwood Lane, Highgate. He became associated with Andrew Kippis in the new edition of the Biographia Britannica, 1778–93, where his contributions are signed "T". The opening of a rival meeting-house in Southwood Lane (1778) had drawn away many of his hearers. Towers left Highgate to become forenoon preacher at Newington Green Unitarian Church in 1778, as coadjutor to Richard Price. On 19 November 1779 he received the diploma of LLD from the University of Edinburgh. From 1790 to 1799 he was a trustee of Daniel Williams's foundations.

He continued to write pamphlets during his lifetime, and a collection was published by subscription, 1796, 8vo, 3 vols. His chief separate work was Memoirs of Frederick the Third of Prussia 1788, 2 vols (on Frederick William II of Prussia, with unconventional regnal numbering). He died on 20 May 1799.

== Family ==
He was married to a relative of Caleb Fleming. Joseph Lomas Towers (1767?–1831), his only son, was educated at St. Paul's School and New College, Hackney. He preached as a Unitarian minister without charge, and in 1792 succeeded Roger Flexman as librarian of Dr Williams's Library; resigning this post in 1804, he led an eccentric life, busy with literary schemes, and collecting books and prints. He became insane in 1830, and died on 4 October 1831, at the White House, Bethnal Green; he was buried in a vault at Elim Chapel, Fetter Lane. He published Illustrations of Prophecy (1796), in two volumes, anonymously, and The Expediency of Cash-Payments by the Bank of England (1811).

His younger brother was John Towers (1747?–1804), who became an independent minister and pastor of a secession from Jewin Street congregation.
