= Robert Roper =

Robert Roper (1757–1838) was an English architect who practised from an office in Preston, Lancashire. His works include at least two new country houses, Claughton Hall, and Leagram Hall, both of which have since been demolished. He designed at least two new churches, Holy Trinity, Hoghton, a Commissioners' church, and St John the Evangelist, Clifton. He rebuilt the naves of the churches of St Michael, Kirkham, and St John the Baptist, Broughton, and also added a façade to Thurnham Hall.

== See also ==
- List of works by Robert Roper
