= St John the Baptist's Church, Broughton =

Coordinates: 53.8035°N 2.7167°W

St John the Baptist's Church
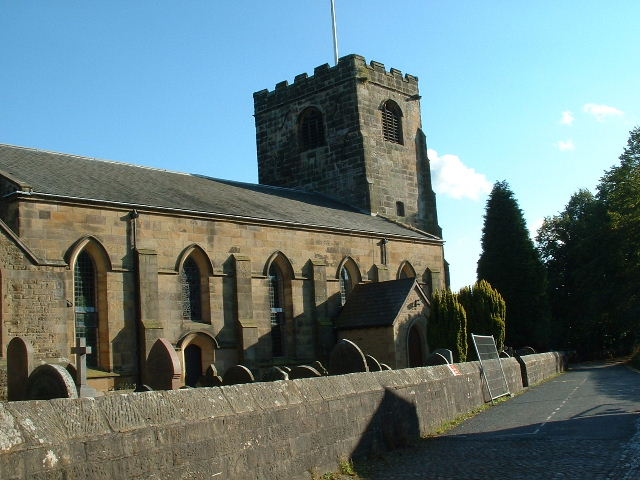
- St John the Baptist's Church from the northeast

- Location in the City of Preston district
- OS grid reference: SD 5290 3440
- Location: Church Lane, Broughton, Lancashire
- Country: England
- Denomination: Anglican
- Website: broughtonparish.org.uk

History
- Status: Parish church
- Dedication: Saint John the Baptist

Architecture
- Functional status: Active
- Heritage designation: Grade II*
- Designated: 11 November 1966
- Architect(s): Robert Roper (nave); Austin and Paley (chancel)
- Architectural type: Church
- Style: Gothic, Gothic Revival
- Completed: 1906

Specifications
- Materials: Sandstone, slate roofs

Administration
- Province: York
- Diocese: Blackburn
- Archdeaconry: Lancaster
- Deanery: Preston
- Parish: St John the Baptist, Broughton

Clergy
- Vicar: Rev Canon Fleur Green

St John the Baptist's Church is in Church Lane, Broughton, Lancashire, England. It is an active Anglican parish church in the deanery of Preston, the archdeaconry of Lancaster, and the diocese of Blackburn. Its benefice is united with those of St Martin, Fulwood, and St Peter, Fulwood. The church is recorded in the National Heritage List for England as a designated Grade II* listed building.

== History ==
The tower of the church is dated 1533. The rest of the church, which dated possibly as far back as the 14th century, was demolished in about 1823. The nave was rebuilt between 1823 and 1826. The architect for this work was Robert Roper. In 1905–06 the chancel, vestries, and an organ chamber were added by the Lancaster architects Austin and Paley. At the same time the whole building was restored, and the box pews were replaced by benches.

== Architecture ==
=== Exterior ===
St John's is constructed in sandstone, and has slate roofs. Its plan consists of a five-bay nave, a north porch, a chancel with an organ chamber to the south, and a west tower. The tower is in three stages with diagonal buttresses, an embattled parapet and a southwest stair turret. On the west side of the tower is a doorway, above which is a three-light window with Perpendicular tracery. In the top stage are three-light louvred bell openings, and small gargoyles near the corners. A string course below the parapet carries the date 1533 on the south side. The nave is in Early English style, and has a large lancet window in each bay, the bays being separated by shallow buttresses. The chancel and organ chamber are in Perpendicular style, with square-headed windows, and an embattled parapet. The east window has three lights. In the gable of the organ chamber are re-set stones dating from the 16th century carved with the shields and initials of local families.

=== Interior ===
The font consists of a large rough bowl, whose date is unknown. Also in the church is a brass chandelier dated 1817. The stained glass in the chancel consists of a scheme of the 1930s by Powells. Also in the church are windows of 1952 by A. F. Erridge, of 1985 by Jane Gray, and of 1999 by Halton Stained Glass. The monuments include a fragment dated 1714, and a brass dated 1908. The three-manual pipe organ was built in 1906 by Henry Ainscough of Preston at a cost of £800 (equivalent to £84,000 in 2025). It was repaired in 1928 and overhauled in 1941. Additions to the organ were made in 1967 and in 1980 by Rushworth and Dreaper of Liverpool. There is a ring of six bells, all cast in 1884 by Mears and Stainbank of the Whitechapel Bell Foundry.

== External features ==
In or near the churchyard are three structures listed at Grade II. To the south of the church is a sundial dating probably from the 18th century. It consists of an octagonal pedestal on a square base, with a brass plate and a scrolled gnomon. Beside the south gate is a two-step mounting block dating from the 18th century or earlier. Nearby are village stocks dating probably from the 18th century. These were restored in 1902 to celebrate the coronation of King Edward VII. The churchyard itself contains the war graves of three British Army personnel of World War I, and two of World War II.

== See also ==
- Grade II* listed buildings in Lancashire
- Listed buildings in Broughton, Lancashire
- List of ecclesiastical works by Austin and Paley (1895–1914)
