= James Towers =

Recipient of the Victoria Cross

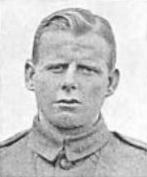
- Born: 9 September 1897; Broughton, Lancashire
- Died: 24 January 1977 (aged 79); Preston, Lancashire
- Burial place: Preston Crematorium
- Military career
- Allegiance: United Kingdom
- Branch: British Army
- Rank: Private
- Units: 5th Dragoon Guards; The Cameronians (Scottish Rifles)
- Conflicts: First World War: Hundred Days Offensive
- Awards: Victoria Cross

James Towers, VC (9 September 1897 – 24 January 1977) was an English soldier, farmer, and a recipient of the Victoria Cross (VC), the highest award for gallantry in the face of the enemy that can be awarded to British and Commonwealth forces. A soldier with The Cameronians during the First World War, he was awarded the VC for his actions on 6 October 1918, during the Hundred Days Offensive.

== Early life ==
Born on 9 September 1897 in the village of Broughton, near Preston in Lancashire, James Towers was the son of a farmer. Educated at Emmanuel Boys' School, he later worked on his father's dairy farm.

== First World War ==
In July 1915, when Towers was 17 and therefore underage, he joined the British Army's West Lancashire Artillery. His true age was discovered and he was discharged and sent home. In August the following year, and now aged 18, he enlisted in the 5th Dragoon Guards, a cavalry regiment but was soon transferred to serve in the infantry with the 2nd Battalion, The Cameronians, also known as the Scottish Rifles. He departed for the Western Front in December 1916.

Towers' battalion was originally part of the 23rd Brigade, 8th Infantry Division but by the time of the Hundred Days Offensive it was serving with the 20th Division. On 6 October 1918, the battalion was defending the village of Méricourt, east of the Beaurevoir Line. It had been ordered to evacuate as German forces surrounded the village and opened fire but a party of 30 men from one company did not receive the instructions to do so. Volunteers were asked to take messages to the missing party and guide them back to British lines. Five men individually set out but all were killed.

Despite seeing what had happened to the previous volunteers, Towers, who acted as a runner for his company, offered to try and find the party. Using his speed and natural agility, and avoiding the heavy machine-gun fire, he was able to make his way to the trapped men. He led them back to the rest of the battalion in the early hours of the next morning. For his actions on 6 October he was awarded the Victoria Cross (VC). The VC, instituted in 1856, was the highest award for valour that could be bestowed on a soldier of the British Empire. The citation for Towers' VC read:

For most conspicuous bravery and devotion to duty at Méricourt on 6 Oct. 1918, when, under heavy fire, five runners having failed to deliver an important message, Private Towers, well aware of the fate of the runners who had already attempted the task, volunteered for the duty. In spite of heavy fire opened on him as soon as he moved, he went straight through from cover to cover and eventually delivered the message. His valour, determination and utter disregard of danger were an inspiring example to all.

— The London Gazette, 4 January 1919

After the war, Towers returned to Broughton and within a few months was discharged from the British Army. He received his VC in a ceremony at Buckingham Palace on 8 May 1919. In an interview to a Lancashire newspaper, in describing his motivation for his actions, Towers said "I felt then that I had to go to the help of these lads. After all, they were my pals".

== Later life ==
Returning to his civilian life, Towers resumed working on the family farm. He attended the interment service for The Unknown Warrior at Westminster Abbey on 11 November 1920, and would be a regular attendee at dinners and other commemorations for VC recipients, including the 1956 VC Centenary at Hyde Park. After his father retired from farming, Towers started his own business. From 1971 his health fell into decline and he died on 24 January 1977 at the Royal Infirmary at Preston in Lancashire. Survived by his wife and a daughter, his ashes were scattered on the lawns of the Preston Crematorium after a service that included representatives of the Scottish Rifles and VC Association.

There are several memorials to Towers; a road is named for him in the Lonsdale Estate in Preston and in Broughton, a major thoroughfare, opened in October 2017, is also named for him. On 6 October 2018, the hundred year anniversary of the action that led to the award of Towers' VC, a commemorative plaque naming him was unveiled at the Preston Flag Market.

== Victoria Cross ==
In addition to the VC, Towers was also entitled to the British War Medal and the Victory Medal for his service in the First World War. The medals remained in the family for several years but were sold at auction in 1983, fetching £7,500 at the time. They appeared again at auction in Australia in 2005, selling this time for a value of £90,000. Ten years later, in an auction held in London, the medals were sold for £144,000 to an anonymous bidder. His VC was again sold at auction for £248,000 in April 2021.
