= St John the Evangelist's Church, Clifton =

Coordinates: 53.7761°N 2.8161°W

- Lund Parish Church
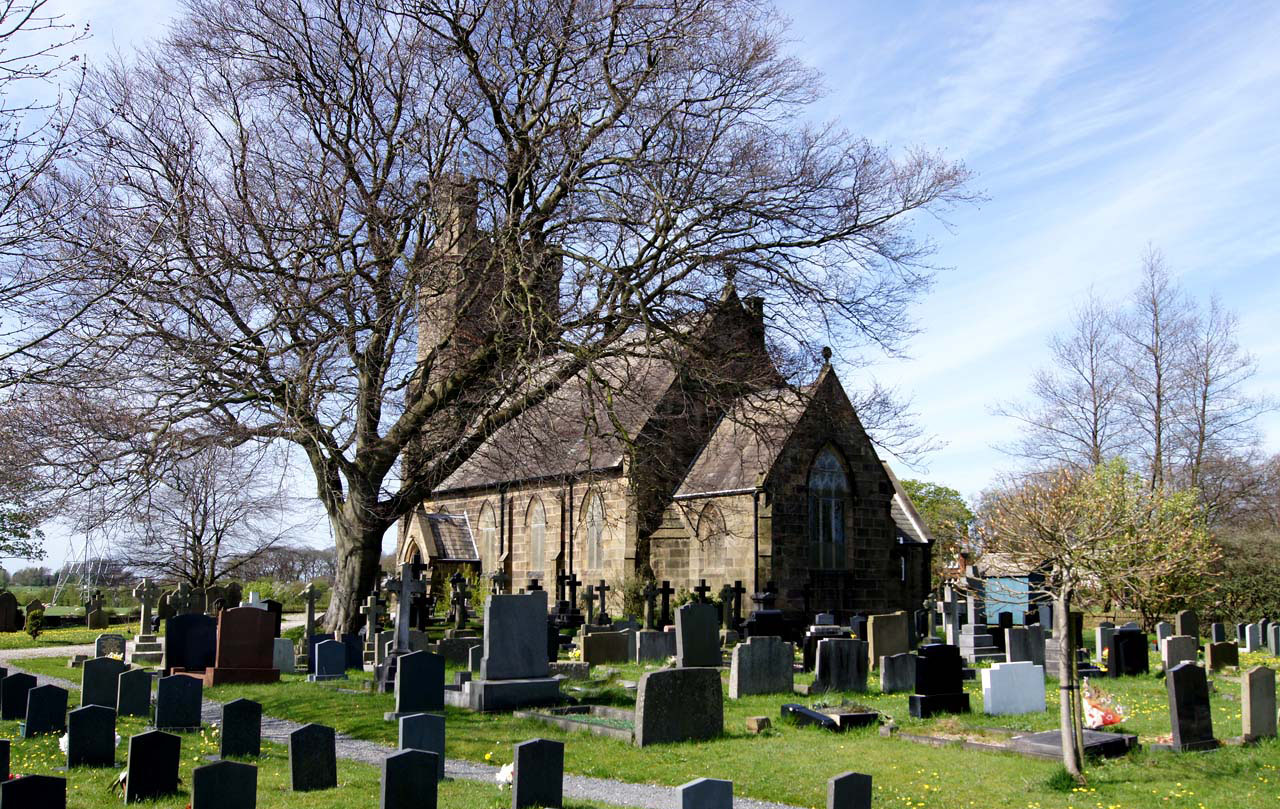
- St John the Evangelist's Church, Clifton, from the southeast

- Location in the Borough of Fylde
- OS grid reference: SD 46314 31392
- Location: Clifton, Lancashire
- Country: England
- Denomination: Anglican
- Website: St John, Clifton

History
- Status: Parish church
- Dedication: Saint John the Evangelist

Architecture
- Functional status: Active
- Architect(s): Robert Roper, Joseph Hansom (chancel), Paley and Austin (tower)
- Architectural type: Church
- Style: Gothic Revival
- Groundbreaking: 1824
- Completed: 1873

Administration
- Province: York
- Diocese: Blackburn
- Archdeaconry: Lancaster
- Deanery: Kirkham
- Parish: Lund

St John the Evangelist's Church, also known as Lund Parish Church, is located on an isolated site near the village of Clifton, Lancashire, England. It is an active Anglican parish church in the deanery of Kirkham, the archdeaconry of Lancaster, and the diocese of Blackburn.

== History ==
The church was built in 1824–25, replacing an older church on the site, and designed by Robert Roper. A chancel was added in 1852, possibly designed by Joseph Hansom. The tower, designed by the Lancaster architects Paley and Austin, was built in 1873. It is thought that the roof of the nave was replaced at this time, and Decorated tracery was installed in the windows.

== Architecture ==
The plan of the church consists of a nave and chancel, without aisles, and a west tower. The tower has an octagonal southeast stair turret, rising above the parapet of the tower. Inside the church, the most notable feature is the font, which has been identified as a former Roman altar, probably moved here from a fort near Kirkham. It is crudely carved with human figures. The stained glass dates from the late 19th and early 20th century, and there are monuments dating from the 19th century.

== See also ==
- List of ecclesiastical works by Paley and Austin
