= Church Cottage Museum =

Museum in Broughton, Lancashire, England

Coordinates: 53°48′13″N 2°42′58″W

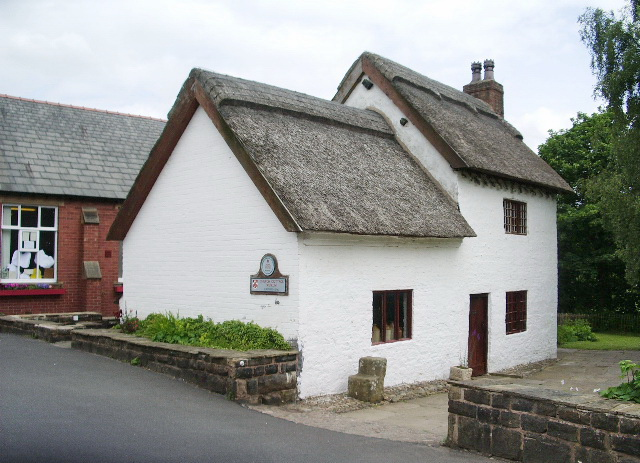
Church Cottage Museum in 2008

Church Cottage Museum is a 16th-century cottage in Broughton, City of Preston, Lancashire, England.

The cottage is grade II listed and is operated as a small museum, open on Sunday afternoons.

The cottage was built in the 16th century and over time was used as an inn and a school room as well as a residence. After the death of its last tenant in 1986 the building became neglected, but it was restored after local fundraising which included a grant from British Aerospace and was opened as a museum by Princess Alexandra in 1995.
