= St Mary's Church, Fernyhalgh =

Roman Catholic church in Lancashire, England

Coordinates: 53.8011°N 2.6780°W

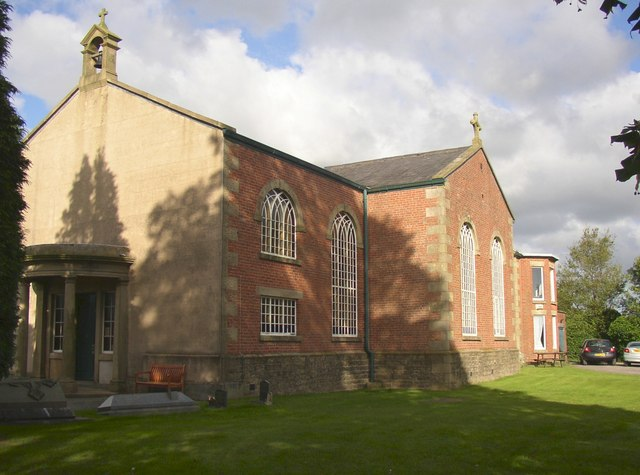
- St Mary's Church and presbytery from the southwest

- Location in the City of Preston district
- OS grid reference: SD 554 341
- Location: Fernyhalgh Lane, Fulwood, Lancashire
- Country: England
- Denomination: Roman Catholic
- Website: St Mary, Fernyhalgh

Architecture
- Functional status: Active
- Heritage designation: Grade II
- Designated: 11 November 1966
- Architectural type: Church
- Groundbreaking: 1792
- Completed: 1794

Administration
- Diocese: Lancaster
- Deanery: Our Lady and St Wilfrid

St Mary's Church is in Fernyhalgh Lane, Fulwood, Lancashire, England. It is a Roman Catholic church located near the shrine at Ladyewell House. The church was built in 1792–94 to provide services for pilgrims when the chapel at the house became too small for the numbers attending. Attached to the east of the church is the presbytery, and both are built in red brick with sandstone dressings with slate roofs. Near the church is a school built in 1836, and later used for other purposes. Ladyewell House contains a 16th-century altar, relics and memorabilia, and in garden are a chapel and a holy well. The church and house are in active use for church services, pilgrimages, and visitors.

== History ==
Fernyhalgh (pronounced /ˈfɜːrniəf/) has been a place of Christian devotion since the 11th century, and this developed further following the Reformation. The house containing the shrine was rebuilt in 1685, from which time the name Ladyewell has been used for it. "Dame Alice" ran a Dame school nearby with over 100 pupils who would visit the shrine and church daily. The church accepted pupils of any denomination but it was essentially a Catholic school. Toward the end of the 18th century the chapel had become too small for the number of pilgrims visiting it, and it was decided to build a larger church. The nearest available land was about 0.25 miles (0.40 km) from the house, and this was purchased. The church and attached presbytery were built in 1792–94, shortly after the passing of the Roman Catholic Relief Act 1791. In about 1844–47 the interior of the church was lavishly painted, stencilled and gilded by Andrew Carter of Preston, and stained glass windows were installed.

== Church ==
=== Exterior ===
The church is built in red brick with a sandstone plinth and dressings, and it has a slate roof with stone gable copings. It has a cruciform plan, with five bays, and north and south two-bay transepts. Each bay contains a large round-headed window with a sandstone archivolt; in the west bay the window is divided into two parts because of the gallery. The west front of the church is rendered, and has a bellcote on the gable, and a semicircular Tuscan porch.

=== Interior ===
Inside the church is a west gallery carried on Doric columns. The two-bay transept arcades have round-headed arches with painted soffits. The ceiling is flat, and there is an elliptical sanctuary arch. The reredos has a blind arcade with four Corinthian columns which is lavishly painted and gilded, including roundels, and a central lozenge containing the Virgin Mary. Above the reredos is a painted dome in deep blue with gold stars and containing a dove. The altar rail is in alabaster, and dates probably from the late 19th century, and the statues are by Mayer of Munich. The stained glass dates from 1854, and is by Andrew Carter. The monuments include one to Catharine Hesketh, who died in 1809, and was a Benedictine nun who became abbess of Ghent. In the floor are memorial brasses to 19th-century incumbents of the church.

== Presbytery ==
The presbytery is attached to the east end of the church. It is also in red brick with sandstone dressings and a slate roof, and has two storeys and two bays. In the second bay is a later canted bay window, and a re-set doorway in a 20th-century lean-to extension. Inside some original features have been retained.

== School ==
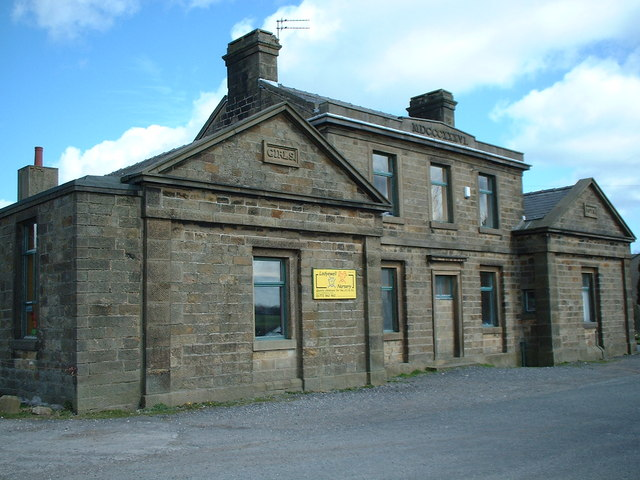
School

The school is located to the west of the church., and was paid for by Fr Richard Gillow, the incumbent. It was built in 1836, and constructed in sandstone with slate roofs. The school is symmetrical with an H-shaped plan, consisting of a main three-bay two-storey range and three-bay single-storey gabled cross wings. The central doorway has a moulded architrave and a cornice, and the windows are rectangular with altered glazing. At the top of the main range is a parapet with a central pediment containing the date of construction in Roman numerals. In the pediments of the wings are tablets inscribed respectively "GIRLS" and "BOYS".

== Shrine ==
Inside Ladyewell House is the Burgess altar and a number of relics and memorabilia of martyrs. The altar was made in 1560 by a Mr Burgess. The most important relic is that of Thomas Becket, which has been authenticated. In the garden is the English Martyrs Chapel and a holy well, and in the woods are the Stations of the Cross.

== Appraisal ==
St Mary's Church was designated as a Grade II listed building on 11 November 1966, and the school was designated at the same grade on 13 January 1986. Grade II is the lowest of the three grades of listing and is applied to buildings "of special interest, warranting every effort to preserve them".

== Present day ==
St Mary's is an active church in the diocese of Lancaster. Mass is said in the church and in Ladyewell House, and the house is open for visitors during the week, all at advertised times. Pilgrimages to the church and house frequently take place. The school has been converted into use as a nursery and a parish centre.

== See also ==
- Listed buildings in Fulwood, Lancashire
- Shrines to the Virgin Mary
