= Vincenzo Pagani =

Italian painter

Vincenzo Pagani (c. 1490–1568) was an Italian painter of the Renaissance period.

== Biography ==
Vincenzo was born at Monterubbiano, near Fermo in the region of Marche, to a father who served as a magistrate, but also had an affinity for painting. He appears to have apprenticed in his father's workshop, being influenced by Carlo Crivelli (as shown by canvases at Ortezzano, from c. 1510). Later he followed the path of Luca Signorelli, as exemplified by a canvas at Corridonia from c. 1517. He is said to have moved to Rome, and worked in the studio of Raphael, but like many other artists fled Rome after 1521, that is after the papacy of Leo X. In Rome, he was described as a colleague of Morale da Fermo.

After leaving Rome, he travelled to Rieti where he painted a Final Judgement fresco in the chapter hall of the Dominican Monastery. He also painted altarpieces depicting an Enthroned Madonna (1517) for the Frati Minori at Monte dell'Olmo; a main altarpiece for the church of Sant'Angelo in Ripantranzone, and a Santa Lucia (1528) for the church of San Francesco in Sarnano.

In the 1520s he was influenced by the Venetian painting school, which he had known from Antonio Solario, then at Fermo, and Lorenzo Lotto, who was working at Recanati. From this period are the Madonna with Four Saints (church at Moresco) and the altarpieces of San Ginesio (1533–1538), and Sant'Agostino, Ascoli Piceno.

Pagani's last recognized work is the Pala Oddi for the church of St. Francis in Perugia (1553).
