= Charlemagne Tower Jr. =

American businessman, scholar, and diplomat

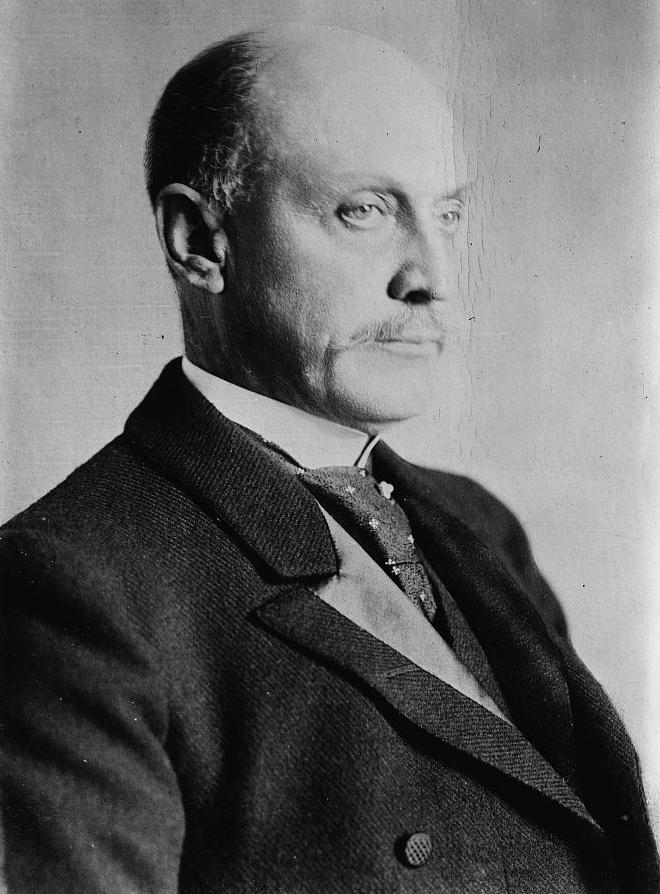

17th United States Minister to Austria-Hungary
- In office June 18, 1897 – February 9, 1899
- Preceded by: Bartlett Tripp
- Succeeded by: Addison C. Harris

Personal details
- Born: April 17, 1848 Philadelphia, Pennsylvania
- Died: February 24, 1923 (aged 74) Philadelphia, Pennsylvania
- Relations: Henrietta Tower (sister)
- Parent(s): Charlemagne Tower Sr. Amelia Marvina Bartle
- Education: Harvard University

Charlemagne Tower Jr. (April 17, 1848 – February 24, 1923) was an American businessman, scholar, and diplomat.

== Biography ==
Charlemagne Tower was born in Philadelphia, Pennsylvania, on April 17, 1848, to Charlemagne Tower Sr. and Amelia Malvina (Bartle) Tower. He was the first of seven children and his sister, Henrietta, was the last.

He spent his childhood in Orwigsburg and Pottsville, Pennsylvania. In 1862 he entered a military academy in New Haven, Connecticut and transferred in 1865 to Phillips Exeter Academy in Exeter, New Hampshire. Tower entered Harvard University in 1868 and graduated in 1872.

After graduating from Harvard, Tower returned to Europe where he lived and traveled for four years. Tower studied history, languages and literature. Initially he lived in the cities of Madrid, Paris and Tours. In 1874 he traveled to Germany and later to Denmark, Sweden, Russia, and Greece.

In July 1876 Tower returned to the United States and was admitted to the bar in 1878, later doing business in the mining and railroad sectors. He moved to Duluth, Minnesota in 1882 when he began serving as president of the Duluth and Iron Range Railroad. In 1887 he returned to Philadelphia.

In 1891 he began to devote himself exclusively to history and archaeology, and became a professor in the University of Pennsylvania. He was elected to the American Philosophical Society in 1895. He served as Minister to Austria-Hungary (1897–1899) for President William McKinley before being transferred to Russia as Ambassador (1899–1902). Following his post in St. Petersburg, he served as Ambassador to Germany from December 1902 to June 1908 under President Theodore Roosevelt. He was a trustee of the University of Pennsylvania, donating a large collection of 2,300 Russian books to the library, which forms the nucleus of Penn's Russian and East European collection.

== Death ==
In 1923 Tower and his wife were living in the Green Hill Farms Hotel in Overbrook, outside of Philadelphia. On February 9, 1923, he entered the Pennsylvania Hospital in Philadelphia. Charlemagne Tower Jr. died February 24, 1923. The cause of death was pneumonia.

== Works ==
- The Marquis de La Fayette in the American Revolution. Philadelphia: J. B. Lippincott Company. 1894. "de kalb." (French translation)
- Diary of a European Trip. Princeton University. (Diary written by Tower when he was an attaché to the American Legation in Madrid, dated 1872–1873).

Diplomatic posts
| Preceded by Bartlett Tripp | Minister to Austria-Hungary; April 1, 1897–February 9, 1899 | Succeeded by Addison C. Harris |
| Preceded by Ethan A. Hitchcock | United States Ambassador to Russia; March 19, 1899–November 19, 1902 | Succeeded by Robert S. McCormick |
| Preceded by Andrew D. White | United States Ambassador to Germany; December 19, 1902–June 8, 1908 | Succeeded by David Jayne Hill |
