= 2011 Preston City Council election =

Map of ward results for Preston City Council 2011. Conservatives (Blue), Labour (Red), Liberal Democrat (Orange), No election held (White)

Elections to the Preston City Council took place on 5 May 2011, the same day as other 2011 United Kingdom local elections. This was also the date of the 2011 United Kingdom Alternative Vote referendum. At this election, The Labour Party regained majority control of the council.

Councillors elected in 2007 Preston City Council election defended their seats this time, following the 2003 Preston Council election elections which began this current cycle. The wards fought in 2011 are to be contested again at the 2015 Preston City Council election with the results in that year compared directly with the results in this.

Other elections can be found at Preston local elections

== 2011 results ==
Preston local election result 2011
Party	Seats	Gains	Losses	Net gain/loss	Seats %	Votes %	Votes	+/−
Conservative	8	0	1	-1	36.84	36.15	11,860	-0.29
Labour	7	4	0	+4	57.89	44.63	14,643	+69.11
Liberal Democrats	2	0	1	-1	5.26	13.44	4,410	-32.53
TUSC	1^{1}	0	1	-1	N/A	2.56	840	-56.72
Independent	1	0	1	-1	0.00	2.12	695	-17.26
England First	0	0	0	0	N/A	0.69	225	N/A
Green	0	0	0	0	N/A	0.42	138	+119

^{1} Candidate is defending seat won in 2007 under the ballot paper description Respect.

== Ward results ==
=== Ashton ===
Defending the north-western suburban electoral ward of Ashton is the Conservative Party with a majority in 2007 of 70

Preston City Council Elections: Ashton ward, 2011
Party	Candidate	Votes	%	±%
Labour	Mark Routledge	750	53.6	+13.8
Conservative	Bill Tyson	517	37.0	−8.6
Liberal Democrats	Stephen Mullen	132	9.44	−5.2
Majority		233	16.65	
Rejected ballots		12		
Turnout		1,399		
Labour gain from Conservative		Swing		

=== Brookfield ===
Labour are defending their 2007 win in Brookfield with a majority of 382

Preston City Council Elections: Brookfield ward, 2011
Party	Candidate	Votes	%	±%
Labour	Nerys Eaves	1,058	67.2	+14.0
Conservative	Damian Moore	516	32.8	+9.0
Majority		542	34.43	
Rejected ballots		20		
Turnout		1,574		
Labour hold		Swing		

=== College ===
In the central north of Preston, to the south of Fulwood, the Conservatives are defending their 2007 win here with a majority of 523

Preston City Council Elections: College ward, 2011
Party	Candidate	Votes	%	±%
Conservative	Harry Seddon	658	49.3	−12.5
Labour	Steve Ratcliffe	453	33.9	+18.6
Liberal Democrats	Julie Voges	225	16.8	−6.1
Majority		1,336	15.34	
Rejected ballots		8		
Turnout			47.8	
Conservative hold		Swing		

=== Deepdale ===
The central eastern electoral ward of Deepdale is represented by an independent councillor whose majority was 275 over Labour in 2007

Preston City Council Elections: Deepdale ward, 2011
Party	Candidate	Votes	%	±%
Labour	Ismail Bax	1,225	60.6	+25.6
Independent	Joyce Cartwright	795	39.4	−12.7
Majority		430	21.29	
Rejected ballots		9		
Turnout		2,020	51.4	
Labour gain from Independent		Swing		

=== Garrison ===
Won by the Conservatives in 2003 and defended in 2007, their majority is 659 over the Liberal Democrats.

Preston City Council Elections: Garrison ward, 2011
Party	Candidate	Votes	%	±%
Conservative	Christine Thomas	1,100	52.9	−5.6
Labour	Lynne Wallace	691	33.2	+15.6
Liberal Democrats	Michael Yates	150	7.2	−16.7
Green	Ian McCormick	138	6.6	N/A
Majority		409	19.67	
Rejected ballots				
Turnout		1,503		
Conservative hold		Swing		

=== Greyfriars ===
The majority defended by the Conservatives is 1,030.

Preston City Council Elections: Greyfriars ward, 2011
Party	Candidate	Votes	%	±%
Conservative	Stephen Thompson	1,585	60.1	−6.7
Labour	Alan Woods	668	25.3	+14.0
Liberal Democrats	Rebecca Finch	383	14.5	−7.4
Majority		917	34.8%	
Rejected ballots		19		
Turnout		2,636		
Conservative hold		Swing		

=== Ingol ===
Covering the Ingol and Tanterton areas of Preston, this is in the northwest of the city. The Liberal Democrats won in 2007 with a majority of 469.

Preston City Council Elections: Ingol ward, 2011
Party	Candidate	Votes	%	±%
Liberal Democrats	Peter Pringle	795	42.7	−15.0
Labour	George Tait	638	34.3	+20.3
Conservative	David Treasure	428	23.0	−5.2
Majority		157	8.44	
Rejected ballots		12		
Turnout		1,861	33.7	
Liberal Democrats hold		Swing		

=== Larches ===
The western ward of Larches also incorporates Savick, in the northwest of the city. This year the Liberal Democrats are defending are majority of 117.

Preston City Council Elections: Larches ward, 2011
Party	Candidate	Votes	%	±%
Labour	Samuel Gardiner	914	46.8	+8.7
Liberal Democrats	Elaine Abbot	703	36.0	−8.6
Conservative	Christopher Rigby	337	17.2	−0.1
Majority		211	10.8	
Rejected ballots		16		
Turnout		1,954	35.7	
Labour gain from Liberal Democrats		Swing		

=== Lea ===
Coterminous to the civil parish of Lea and Cottam, this electoral ward is defended by the Conservatives with a majority of 429

Preston City Council Elections: Lea ward, 2011
Party	Candidate	Votes	%	±%
Conservative	Julie Buttle	1,032	52.4	−4.3
Liberal Democrats	Andrew Walker	497	25.2	−7.4
Labour	Lee Bradshaw	440	22.3	+11.5
Majority		535	27.17	
Turnout		1,969	27.17	

=== Moor Park ===
For the 2011 election, the Labour Party defend a majority over the Conservatives of 360 votes.

Preston City Council Elections: Moor Park ward, 2011
Party	Candidate	Votes	%	±%
Labour	David Borrow	799	72.9	+13.7
Conservative	Sheila Heys	216	19.7	−3.6
Liberal Democrats	Jeffrey Abram	81	7.4	−10.1
Majority		583	53.19	
Rejected ballots				
Turnout		1,096	31.3	
Labour hold		Swing		

=== Preston Rural East ===
The Rural East wards incorporates the Amounderness, Broughton and Grimsargh civil parishes in the north and east of the city. The current defending party with a majority of 786 for the Conservatives.

Preston City Council Elections: Rural East ward, 2011
Party	Candidate	Votes	%	±%
Conservative	Neil Cartright	1,029	65.5	−7.3
Labour	Gerard Parke-Hatton	398	25.4	+10.2
Liberal Democrats	Peter Lawrence	143	9.1	−2.9
Majority		631	40.2	
Rejected ballots				
Turnout		1,570	43.7	

=== Preston Rural North ===
Reaching across the city of Preston, the large Preston Rural North ward includes the M6 and M55 motorways and acres of market towns, farming communities and rural areas. The boroughs of Fylde and Wyre border this northern ward, which is a three-member ward. The Conservative Party won in 2007 with the majority of 1,444.

Preston City Council Elections: Rural North ward, 2011
Party	Candidate	Votes	%	±%
Conservative	Kate Calder	1,878	71.6	−5.3
Labour	Alan Mathews	471	17.9	+10.0
Liberal Democrats	William Bruton	275	10.5	−4.7
Majority		1,407	53.6%	
Rejected ballots				
Turnout		2,624		

=== Ribbleton ===
Ribbleton, is one of the largest in size, won four years ago by Labour over the Conservative Party with a majority of 394

Preston City Council Elections: Ribbleton ward, 2011
Party	Candidate	Votes	%	±%
Labour	Brian Rollo	930	64.2	+7.9
Conservative	Steve Allen	293	20.2	−5.8
England First	Mark Cotterill	225	15.5	N/A
Majority		637	44.00	
Rejected ballots				
Turnout		1,448	25.9	

=== Riversway ===
Riversway was won by Labour in 2007 over the Respect Party, winning by 191 votes.

Preston City Council Elections: Riversway ward, 2011
Party	Candidate	Votes	%	±%
Labour	Bhikhu Patel	1,055	70.9	+29.7
Liberal Democrats	Wilf Gavin	225	15.1	+1.2
Conservative	Hussain Mulla	207	13.9	−3.4
Majority		830	55.8	
Rejected ballots				
Turnout		1,487	34.9	

=== Sharoe Green ===
The Sharoe Green ward is based on the former hospital and surrounding commuter belt environs. The 2011 election has the Conservative Party defending a majority of 639 over the Liberal Democrats.

Preston City Council Elections: Sharoe Green ward, 2011
Party	Candidate	Votes	%	±%
Conservative	Eric Fazackerley	1,165	53.2	−5.7
Labour	Mair Ratcliffe	716	32.7	+17.1
Liberal Democrats	Rowena Edmondson	309	14.1	−11.4
Majority		449	20.5	
Rejected ballots		20		
Turnout		2,190	43.0	

=== St Matthews ===
The 2007 result in the St Matthews was a Labour win with a 336 majority

Preston City Council Elections: St Matthews ward, 2011
Party	Candidate	Votes	%	±%
Labour	Javed Iqbal	1,105	84.0	+34.0
Conservative	Lucinda Heaton	211	16.0	+3.4
Majority		894	67.9	
Rejected ballots		14		
Turnout		1,316	27.0	

=== Town Centre ===
Formed by boundary changes prior to Preston being awarded city status, Town Centre is the largest non-rural ward in the borough. Michael Lavalette won the ward in 2007 under the Respect Party label although as of 2011 he sits in Preston Town Hall under the label "Independent Socialist".

Preston City Council Elections: Town Centre ward, 2011
Party	Candidate	Votes	%	±%
Labour	Yakub Patel	964	45.7	+13.9
TUSC	Michael Lavalette	840	39.8	−12.5
Conservative	Jonathan Cooper	305	14.5	+10.6
Majority		124	5.9	
Rejected ballots		17		
Turnout		2,109	38.9	
Labour gain from TUSC		Swing		

=== Tulketh ===
Tulketh is a ward to the west of the city centre. Labour won over the Conservatives in 2007 with a lead of 230 votes.

Preston City Council Elections: Tulketh ward, 2011
Party	Candidate	Votes	%	±%
Labour	Robert Boswell	980	58.3	+9.40
Liberal Democrats	Neil Darby	432	25.7	+8.60
Conservative	Mark Dodsworth	269	16.0	−18.0
Majority		548	32.6	
Rejected ballots		26		
Turnout		1,681	33.2	

=== University ===
Shaped around the outskirts of the city centre, this butterfly-wing shaped ward was won by Labour in 2003 with a majority of 116

Preston City Council Elections: University ward, 2011
Party	Candidate	Votes	%	±%
Labour	John Swindells	388	69.0	+19.4
Conservative	Genna Martin	114	20.3	+5.4
Liberal Democrats	Michael Basford	60	10.7	−18.3
Majority		274	48.8	
Rejected ballots		26		
Turnout		562	33.2	

== See also ==
- Preston (UK Parliament constituency)
