= Richard Threlfall =

English chemist and engineer

Sir Richard Threlfall GBE FRS
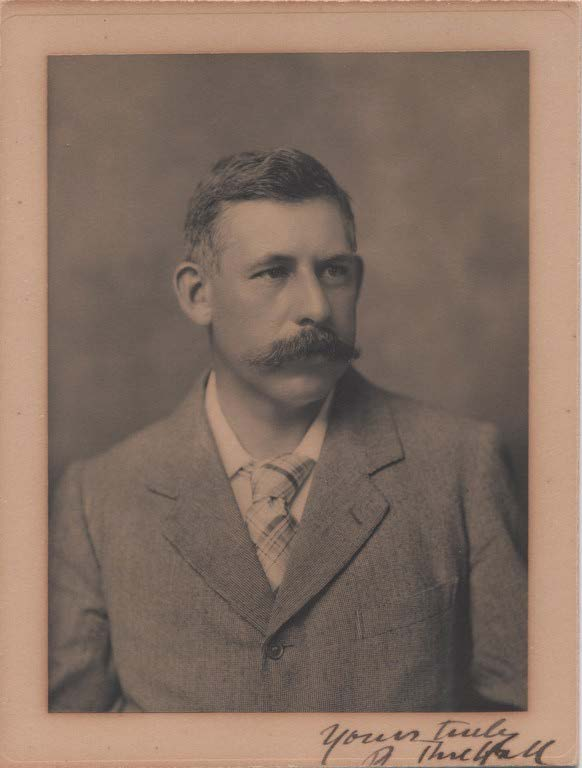

Sir Richard Threlfall (14 August 1861 – 10 July 1932) was an English chemist and engineer, he established the School of Physics at the University of Sydney and made important contributions to military science during World War I. In 1899, he was elected a fellow of the Royal Society. In 1917, he was created KBE and then GBE in 1927.

== Science and consulting career ==
After the discovery new waves by Heinrich Hertz, Threlfall suggested in a 1890 oral discussion that "Signaling, for instance, might be accomplished secretly by means of a sort of electric ray flasher", thus predicting yet-uninvented radio communications.

In July 1915 he invented the 'Threlfallite' hand grenade, consisting of a cylindrical tin containing white phosphorus, paraffin, oil and petrol. Originally designed as an incendiary device to destroy long grass in front of the trenches that gave cover to enemy raiding parties, it also had a useful smoke-producing effect and was used at the Battle of Loos.

== Death ==
Threlfall died on 10 July 1932 and is buried in a family tomb at St Anne's Church, Woodplumpton, Lancashire. He was survived by four sons and two daughters. He was the author of On Laboratory Arts.
