= 2026 Preston City Council election =

2026 English local government election

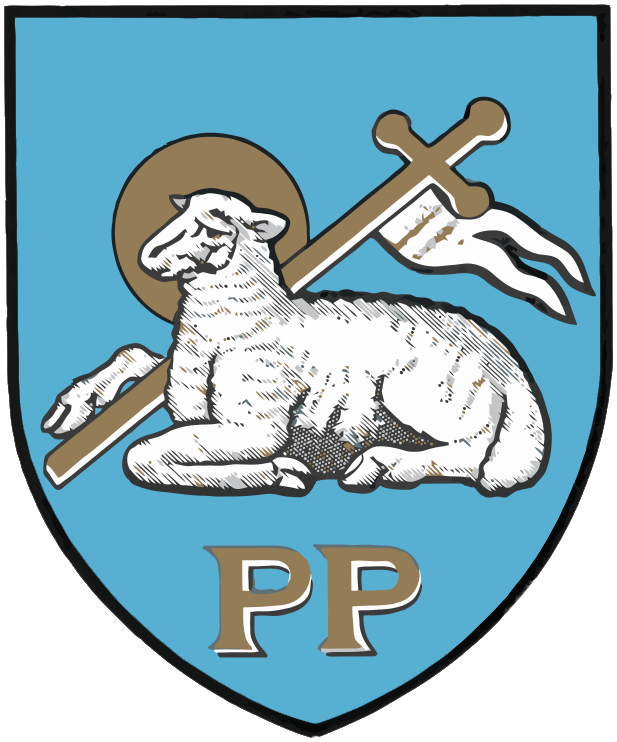
- 7 May 2026

16 out of 48 seats to Preston City Council 25 seats needed for a majority
- Turnout: 33.7%
	First party	Second party	Third party
Leader	Matthew Brown	John Potter	Stephen Thompson
Party	Labour	Liberal Democrats	Reform
Last election	30 seats, 40.3%	12 seats, 29.1%	0 seats, 0.8%
Seats before	26	14	1
Seats won	4	5	5
Seats after	22	14	5
Seat change	▼4	Steady	▲4
Popular vote	7,859	8,582	10,235
Percentage	21.0%	22.9%	27.3%
Swing	▼19.3%	▼6.2%	▲26.5%
	Fourth party	Fifth party	Sixth party
Leader	Harry Landless	Avery Greatorex
Party	Conservative	Green	Independent
Last election	6 seats, 21.4%	Did not stand	0 seats, 1.7%
Seats before	5	0	2 (Note: Some sources report that Carol Henshaw has joined Your Party. However, she is listed by Preston City Council as an independent.)
Seats won	0	2	0
Seats after	3	2	2
Seat change	▼2	▲2	Steady
Popular vote	4,053	6,170	460
Percentage	10.8%	16.6%	1.2%
Swing	▼10.6%	N/A	▼0.5%
- Results of the 2026 Preston City Council Election
Leader before election
Matthew Brown
Labour Co-op
Leader after election
Matthew Brown
Labour Co-op
No overall control (Note: Labour minority.)

The 2026 Preston City Council election was held on 7 May 2026, alongside the other local elections across the United Kingdom being held on the same day, to elect 16 of 48 members of Preston City Council in Lancashire, England.

Prior to the election, the council was under Labour majority control. At the election, the council went under no overall control. Labour remained the largest party, but fell three seats short of a majority. Labour managed to form a minority administration after the election; at the subsequent annual council meeting on 21 May 2026, the incumbent Labour leader of the council, Matthew Brown, was reappointed to the role.

== Background ==
In 2024, the Labour Party retained majority control of the council. In January 2026, the council asked for the election to be postponed pending local government reorganisation. However it was rescheduled on 16 February 2026.

=== Council composition ===
After 2024 election		Before 2026 election	
Party	Seats	Party	Seats
Labour	30	Labour	26
Liberal Democrats	12	Liberal Democrats	14
Conservative	6	Conservative	5
Reform	0	Reform	1
Independent	0	Independent	3

Changes 2024–2026:

- May 2024: David Borrow (Labour) resigns – by-election held July 2024
- July 2024: Sean Little (Liberal Democrats) gains by-election from Labour
- March 2025: Carol Henshaw (Labour) suspended from party
- September 2025:
  - Robert Boswell (Labour) resigns – by-election held October 2025
  - Stephen Thompson (Conservative) joins Reform
- October 2025:
  - Ronan Hodgson (Liberal Democrats) gains by-election from Labour
  - Liz Atkins (Labour) leaves party to sit as an independent
- May 2026: Freddie Bailey (Labour) suspended from party

== Election result ==
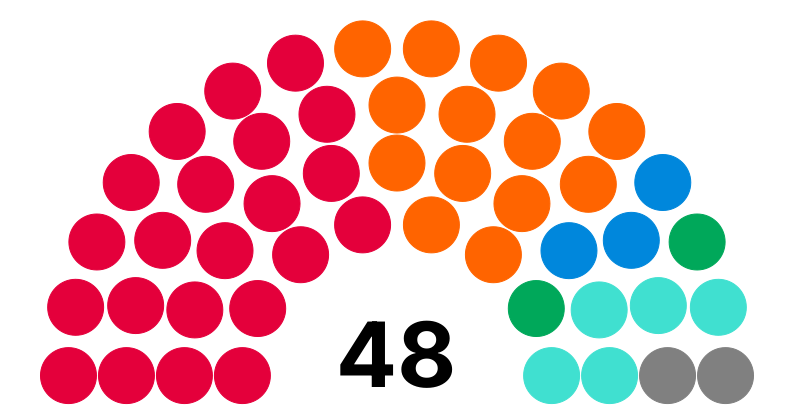
Preston City Council's composition following the 2026 elections.

2026 Preston City Council election
Party	This election				Full council			This election		
Party	Candidates	Seats	Net	Seats %	Other	Total	Total %	Votes	Votes %	+/−
Labour	{{{candidates}}}	4	▼4	21.0	18	22	45.8	7,859	21.0	–19.3
Liberal Democrats	{{{candidates}}}	5	Steady	31.3	9	14	29.2	8,582	22.9	–6.2
Reform	{{{candidates}}}	5	▲4	31.3	0	5	10.4	10,235	27.3	+26.5
Conservative	{{{candidates}}}	0	▼2	0.0	0	3	6.3	4,053	10.8	–10.6
Green	{{{candidates}}}	2	▲2	12.5	0	2	4.2	6,223	16.6	N/A
Independent	{{{candidates}}}	0	Steady	0.0	2	2	4.2	460	1.2	–0.5
TUSC	{{{candidates}}}	0	Steady	0.0	0	0	0.0	22	0.1	–2.4

== Ward results ==
=== Ashton ===
Ashton
Party	Candidate	Votes	%	±%
Liberal Democrats	Ronan Hodgson*	836	33.5	+12.0
Reform	Lee Slater	723	29.0	N/A
Labour	Andrew Maclaren	428	17.1	−41.7
Green	Rachel Gill	373	14.9	N/A
Conservative	Keith Sedgewick	136	5.4	−14.3
Majority		113	4.5	N/A
Turnout		2,503	38.6	+11.4
Registered electors		6,481		
Liberal Democrats gain from Labour				

=== Brookfield ===
Brookfield
Party	Candidate	Votes	%	±%
Reform	Rob Walsh	665	42.5	N/A
Labour	Mel Close*	437	28.0	−38.5
Green	Robin Weston	237	15.2	N/A
Conservative	Daniel Duckworth	118	7.5	−6.4
Liberal Democrats	Rebecca Potter	106	6.8	−12.8
Majority		228	14.5	N/A
Turnout		1,565	27.4	+8.6
Registered electors		5,721		
Reform gain from Labour				

=== Cadley ===
Cadley
Party	Candidate	Votes	%	±%
Liberal Democrats	Daniel Gregg*	1,037	40.2	−8.1
Reform	Flo Emmanuel	762	29.6	N/A
Labour	Isaac Omopariola	304	11.8	−14.6
Green	Jono Grisdale	282	10.9	N/A
Conservative	Lakwinder Singh	192	7.5	−9.5
Majority		275	10.6	–11.3
Turnout		2,584	38.4	+8.6
Registered electors		6,728		
Liberal Democrats hold				

=== City Centre ===
City Centre
Party	Candidate	Votes	%	±%
Green	Tina Balmer	821	39.7	N/A
Labour	Mark Routledge	572	27.7	▼30.7
Reform	Lorenzo More	357	17.3	N/A
Conservative	Andy Pratt	199	9.6	▼11.5
Liberal Democrats	Sam Zhang-Peak	119	5.8	▼14.7
Majority		249	12.0	N/A
Turnout		2,080	24.0	▲5.0
Registered electors		8,655		
Green gain from Labour				

=== Deepdale ===
Deepdale
Party	Candidate	Votes	%	±%
Labour	Zafar Coupland*	1,219	54.1	+3.2
Green	Kevin Rigotti	636	28.2	N/A
Reform	John Knight	231	10.2	N/A
Liberal Democrats	Nathalie Cain	87	3.9	−6.7
Conservative	Nigel Lister	82	3.6	−3.6
Majority		583	25.9	+6.0
Turnout		2,260	33.8	+5.7
Registered electors		6,682		
Labour hold				

=== Fishwick & Frenchwood ===
Fishwick & Frenchwood
Party	Candidate	Votes	%	±%
Labour Co-op	Valerie Wise*	846	43.9	−17.2
Green	Christopher Soames	594	30.8	N/A
Reform	Stephen Gregson	298	15.5	N/A
Conservative	Ash Jariwala	115	6.0	−7.3
Liberal Democrats	Joanne Joyner	73	3.8	−21.8
Majority		252	13.1	N/A
Turnout		1,932	31.4	+3.9
Registered electors		6,146		
Labour Co-op hold				

=== Garrison ===
Garrison
Party	Candidate	Votes	%	±%
Labour	Amber Afzal*	983	36.8	−17.0
Reform	Simon Holmes	774	29.0	N/A
Green	Helen Disley	356	13.3	N/A
Conservative	Al-Yasa Khan	254	9.5	−10.8
Liberal Democrats	Claire Craven	239	9.0	−16.9
Independent	Aran Bailey	64	2.4	N/A
Majority		209	7.8	–20.1
Turnout		2,674	39.8	+9.8
Registered electors		6,716		
Labour hold				

=== Greyfriars ===
Greyfriars
Party	Candidate	Votes	%	±%
Liberal Democrats	Fiona Duke*	1,258	45.1	−2.3
Reform	Simon Crowe	622	22.3	N/A
Labour	Joanne Black	309	11.1	−12.8
Conservative	Andrew Bielas-Barnes	309	11.1	−17.6
Green	Jacon Bilsborrow	294	10.5	N/A
Majority		636	22.8	+4.1
Turnout		2,796	44.6	+8.9
Registered electors		6,276		
Liberal Democrats hold				

=== Ingol & Cottam ===
Ingol & Cottam
Party	Candidate	Votes	%	±%
Liberal Democrats	Neil Darby*	1,248	45.3	+1.6
Reform	David Preston	821	29.8	+19.4
Conservative	Sarah Hart	281	10.2	−17.7
Green	Toby Worth	239	8.7	N/A
Labour	Derek Barton	163	5.9	−12.1
Majority		427	15.5	–0.3
Turnout		2,756	35.1	+8.8
Registered electors		7,853		
Liberal Democrats hold		Swing	▼8.9	

=== Lea & Larches ===
Lea & Larches
Party	Candidate	Votes	%	±%
Reform	Jemma Rushe	829	39.2	N/A
Liberal Democrats	Sean Little*	823	38.9	+2.7
Labour	Bill Adams	222	10.5	−24.9
Green	Keith Berry	162	7.7	N/A
Conservative	Javaris Maharaj	79	3.7	−5.5
Majority		6	0.3	N/A
Turnout		2,122	32.8	+7.8
Registered electors		6,480		
Reform gain from Labour				

=== Plungington ===
Plungington
Party	Candidate	Votes	%	±%
Green	Gabie Lowe	641	37.3	N/A
Labour	Pav Akhtar*	538	31.3	▼30.8
Reform	Susan Brown	438	25.5	N/A
Conservative	Frankie Kennedy	81	4.7	▼10.3
TUSC	Penelope Dawber	22	1.3	▼8.8
Majority		103	6.0	N/A
Turnout		1,831	21.8	▲4.5
Registered electors		8,417		
Green gain from Labour				

=== Preston Rural East ===
Preston Rural East
Party	Candidate	Votes	%	±%
Reform	Daniel Nuttall	1,172	32.3	N/A
Conservative	Steven Whittam*	980	27.0	−21.5
Liberal Democrats	Liam Yip	610	16.8	−2.7
Green	Karen Kendall	523	14.4	N/A
Labour	Beth Moore	345	9.5	−22.5
Majority		192	5.3	N/A
Turnout		3,634	39.4	+11.4
Registered electors		9,222		
Reform gain from Conservative				

=== Preston Rural North ===
Preston Rural North
Party	Candidate	Votes	%	±%
Reform	Stephen Thompson*	983	34.1	N/A
Liberal Democrats	Rene van Mierlo	932	32.3	−15.6
Conservative	Fay Whittam	515	17.8	−17.5
Green	Daniel Bennett	244	8.5	N/A
Labour	Lynne Brooks	212	7.3	−9.5
Majority		51	1.8	N/A
Turnout		2,892	39.4	+11.9
Registered electors		7,339		
Reform gain from Conservative				

=== Ribbleton ===
Ribbleton
Party	Candidate	Votes	%	±%
Reform	Vasile Alecu	625	47.1	N/A
Labour	Michael McGowan	340	25.6	−39.6
Green	Daniel Thompson	200	15.1	N/A
Conservative	Tes Slater	89	6.7	−11.2
Liberal Democrats	Edward Craven	72	5.4	−11.6
Majority		285	21.5	–25.8
Turnout		1,328	22.7	+6.2
Registered electors		5,846		
Reform gain from Labour				

=== Sharoe Green ===
Sharoe Green
Party	Candidate	Votes	%	±%
Liberal Democrats	Jack Singh	975	34.3	−9.3
Reform	Brian Ollerton	638	22.5	N/A
Conservative	Maxwell Green*	552	19.4	−2.3
Green	Amy Strettle	351	12.4	N/A
Labour	Rick Seymour	323	11.4	−23.2
Majority		337	11.8	N/A
Turnout		2,847	45.0	+5.7
Registered electors		6,324		
Liberal Democrats gain from Conservative				

=== St Matthew's ===
St Matthew's
Party	Candidate	Votes	%	±%
Labour	Takhsin Akhtar	618	36.1	−28.2
Independent	Waqas Ahmed	396	23.1	N/A
Reform	Charlie Fitzpatrick	297	17.4	N/A
Green	Gareth Basterfield	270	15.8	N/A
Conservative	Tayo Korede	71	4.1	−9.6
Liberal Democrats	Anita Murray	59	3.4	−18.6
Majority		222	13.0	–29.3
Turnout		1,713	26.7	+6.5
Registered electors		6,408		
Labour hold				
