= Catforth =

Village in Lancashire, England

Coordinates: 53.815°N 2.794°W

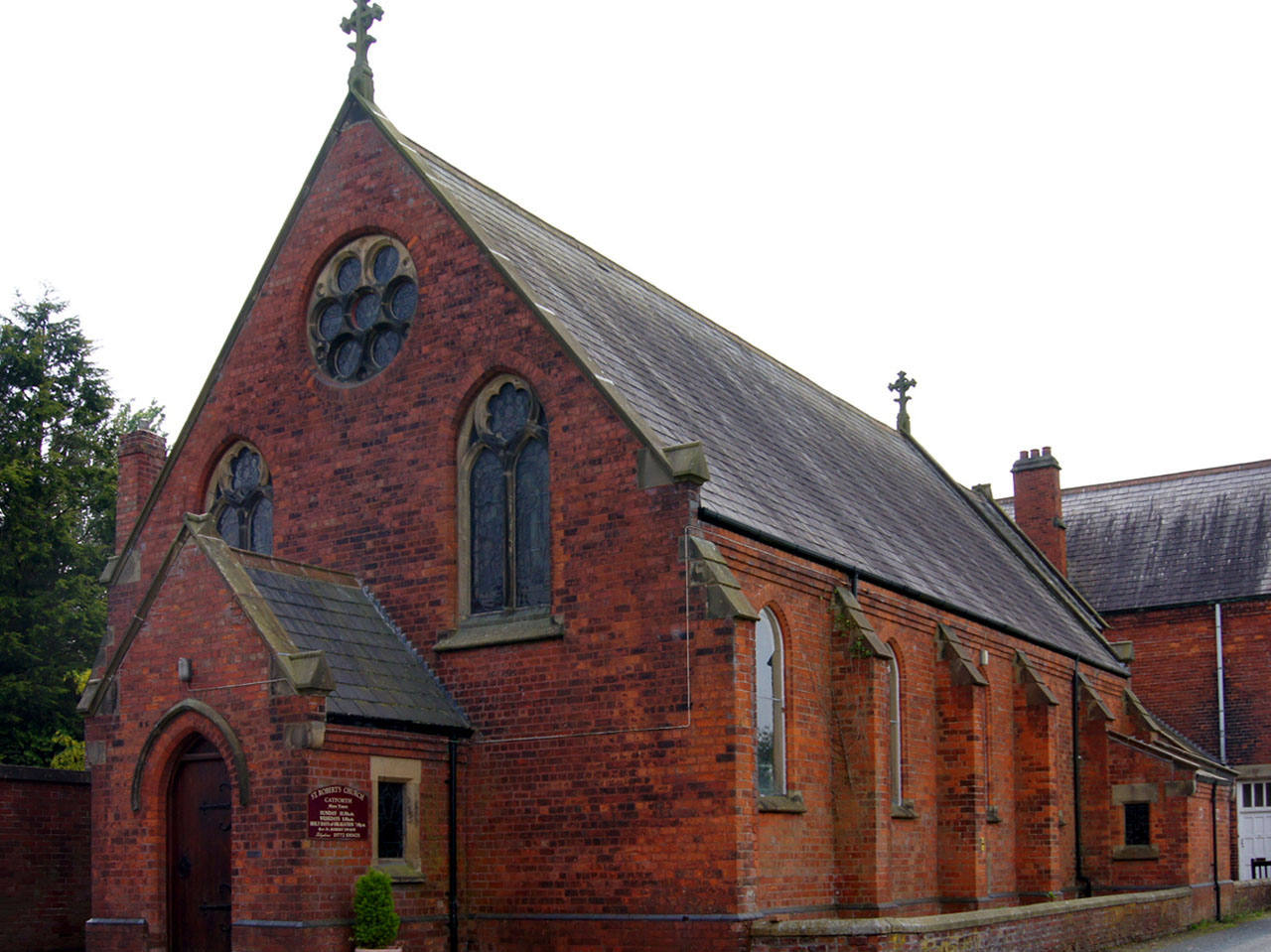
- Roman Catholic Church in Catforth

- Shown within the City of Preston district Shown on the Fylde Location within Lancashire
- OS grid reference: SD480354
- Civil parish: Woodplumpton
- District: Preston
- Shire county: Lancashire
- Region: North West
- Country: England
- Sovereign state: United Kingdom
- Post town: PRESTON
- Postcode district: PR4
- Dialling code: 01772
- Police: Lancashire
- Fire: Lancashire
- Ambulance: North West
- UK Parliament: Ribble Valley

Catforth is a village in the English civil parish of Woodplumpton and the City of Preston district, in Lancashire, England. There is a village hall and the now-closed pub, The Running Pump, is situated on Catforth Road, which is the village's main road. There is a Roman Catholic church and a primary school.

== See also ==
- Listed buildings in Woodplumpton
