= Eaves, Lancashire =

Hamlet in Lancashire, England

Coordinates: 53.832°N 2.777°W

Eaves
- The Plough at Eaves public house, Eaves

- Shown within the City of Preston district Shown on the Fylde Location within Lancashire
- OS grid reference: SD507373
- Civil parish: Woodplumpton
- District: Preston
- Shire county: Lancashire
- Region: North West
- Country: England
- Sovereign state: United Kingdom
- Post town: PRESTON
- Postcode district: PR4
- Dialling code: 01772
- Police: Lancashire
- Fire: Lancashire
- Ambulance: North West
- UK Parliament: Ribble Valley

Eaves is a hamlet in Lancashire, England, six miles north of Preston. It is part of the Fylde, a flat area of land between the Forest of Bowland and the Lancashire coast. The village has a school, St. Mary and St. Andrew's Catholic Primary School, and a pub, the Plough at Eaves, which is the oldest in the Fylde. It was originally called the Cheadle Plough Inn.

Eaves is in the parish of Woodplumpton.

== See also ==
- Listed buildings in Woodplumpton
