= The Plough at Eaves =

Pub in Lancashire, England

- The pub in 2019

- Location within the City of Preston district
- Interactive map of the The Plough at Eaves area
- Former names: The Plough at Cuddy Hill; Cuddy Pub; The Cheadle Plough Inn

General information
- Type: Public house
- Location: Eaves Lane, Eaves, Lancashire, England
- Coordinates: 53.831692°N 2.770247°W
- Completed: 1625 (401 years ago)

Technical details
- Floor count: 2

Website
- findapub.thwaites.co.uk/pubs-and-pub-finder/pubs/woodplumpton/plough/

The Plough at Eaves is a public house on Eaves Lane in Eaves, Lancashire, a hamlet of Woodplumpton. It is owned by Thwaites Brewery.

Dating to 1625, when it was a free house, it is believed to be the oldest pub in Lancashire.

At one time the pub was named the Plough at Cuddy Hill, or the Cuddy Pub. Cuddy Hill references an area rather than a village. There was a Battle of Cuddy Hill in 1546, and the Plough is said to stand somewhere on the battlefield. It was also used as a refuge by the opposing sides in the 1648 Battle of Preston.

Another of its early names was the Cheadle Plough Inn.

The main bar is in the larger of the two sections of the pub. A smaller bar is in the fieldstone portion of the building.

The pub had a K6-style red telephone box outside until around 2017. A pedestal-style post box from around the 1960s remains.

== Gallery ==
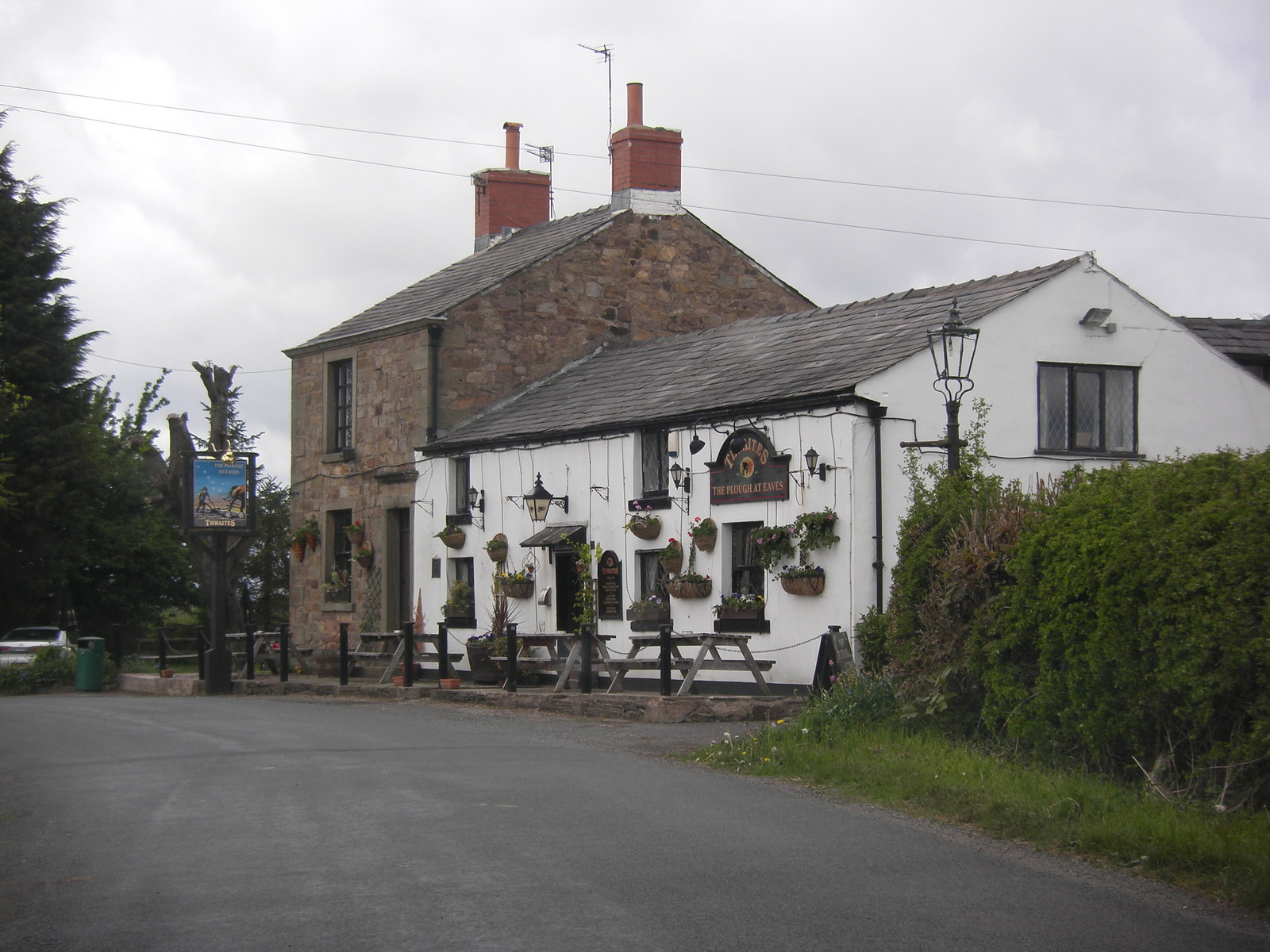
The pub's exterior until 2013

An early pub sign now hangs in the hallway of the pub

The current welcome sign

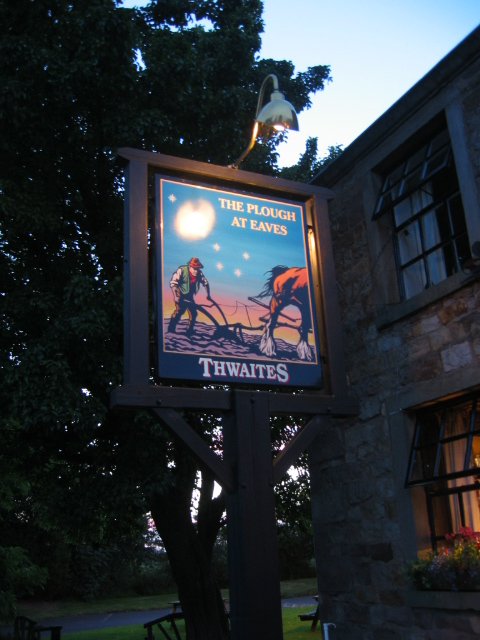
The previous iteration

During its time as the Cheadle Plough Inn

The main bar, pictured in 2019

A 2019 view from the front stoop
