= Listed buildings in Woodplumpton =

Woodplumpton is a civil parish in the City of Preston, Lancashire, England. It contains 20 listed buildings that are recorded in the National Heritage List for England. Of these, one is at Grade II*, the middle grade, and the others are at Grade II, the lowest grade. The parish contains the villages of Woodplumpton and Catforth, and the smaller settlements of Eaves and Lower Bartle, but is otherwise rural. The Lancaster Canal passes through the parish, and three bridges crossing it are listed. The oldest building in the parish is St Anne's Church; this and four structures associated with it, or nearby, are listed. The other listed buildings are houses and associated structures, farmhouses, and farm buildings.

== Key ==
Grade	Criteria
II*	Particularly important buildings of more than special interest
II	Buildings of national importance and special interest

== Buildings ==
Name and location	Photograph	Date	Notes	Grade
St Anne's Church; 53.80387°N 2.76175°W		c. 1300	Much of the church dates from the late 15th or early 16th century, and the 18th century, and the church was restored in 1900. It is built in sandstone and gritstone, and has roofs of slate and stone-slate. The church consists of a nave, north and south aisles under parallel roofs, the aisles being in different architectural styles, a northeast vestry, and a west tower. The tower is square with a round-headed window, a moulded cornice, and an octagonal lantern surmounted by a small dome and a weathervane.	II*
Barn, Catforth Hall Farm; 53.81546°N 2.78295°W	—	16th century (or earlier) (probable)	The barn is cruck-framed with cladding in red brick and some sandstone. It is partly rendered, and has a corrugated sheet roof. Inside there are six full cruck trusses.	II
Adamson's Farmhouse; 53.82973°N 2.77293°W	—	1620	The house is in brick with a tile roof, in 1 1/2 storeys and with four bays. Most of the windows are casements, and there is a square dormer. Inside the house is a timber-framed partition.	II
Church House Farmhouse; 53.80388°N 2.76121°W	—	Early to mid 17th century	The house is in brick with a slate roof. It has three bays, and there are two storeys, with timber-framing applied to the upper storey. In the lower floor the windows are sashes, and above they are casements. Inside are back-to-back inglenooks with bressumers.	II
Sundial; 53.80371°N 2.76185°W	—	1637	The sundial is in the churchyard of St Anne's Church. It is in stone, and has a chamfered column as a pedestal, and a square top. On the top is a brass plate and a scrolled gnomon.	II
Anderton House; 53.79329°N 2.78820°W	—	Late 17th century	A cruck-framed house with sandstone cladding, partly rendered, and a thatched roof. It has three bays and 1/2 storeys. The windows are mullioned, those in the upper floor being in gabled dormers. Inside the house are a full cruck truss, an inglenook, and a bressumer.	II
Barn, Moon's Farm; 53.81938°N 2.75490°W	—	Late 17th century (probable)	The barn is in brick with some sandstone and has a corrugated sheet roof. There are four bays, and the barn contains a wagon entrance, doorways, some of which have been converted into windows, and ventilation holes in diamond patterns.	II
Ambrose Hall; 53.81074°N 2.76079°W	—	1697 (or earlier)	Originally a farmhouse, later divided into two dwellings. It is in stuccoed brick with a slate roof, and has two storeys and three bays. On the front is a single-storey gabled porch, and 19th-century mullioned and transomed windows. At the rear is an outshut with sash windows. Inside are back-to-back inglenooks and bressumers, and timber-framed partitions.	II
Moon's Farmhouse; 53.81947°N 2.75544°W		1698	The house is in brick, partly roughcast, with a thatched roof, in two storeys and three bays. On the front is a single-storey gabled porch, and the windows are sliding sashes. Inside the house is an inglenook and a bressumer.	II
South View; 53.80891°N 2.75901°W		Late 17th or early 18th century	Originally a farmhouse and an attached shippon, later converted into one house. It is cruck-framed and clad in brick, and has a thatched roof. The house has a single storey with an attic, and five bays. The windows have been altered. Inside are three full cruck trusses.	II
Gateway, St Anne's Church; 53.80362°N 2.76178°W	—	18th century (or earlier)	The gateway has posts apparently re-used from stocks. It consists of two stone posts with round heads containing slots for rails on the inner faces.	II
Mounting block 53.80375°N 2.76152°W	—	18th century (or earlier)	The mounting block stands against the churchyard wall of St Anne's Church. It consists of a sandstone block that has been cut to make three steps.	II
Stocks; 53.80375°N 2.76150°W		18th century (or earlier)	The stocks stand outside the churchyard wall of St Anne's Church. They consist of two stone posts with round heads containing restored wooden rails with holes for two pairs of legs. The right hand post carries an inscription.	II
Eaves Cottage Farmhouse; 53.82939°N 2.76682°W	—	Early 18th century	The house was extended in the early 19th century. It is in brick, partly stuccoed, with a slate roof, and has two storeys. The original part has an L-shaped plan and two bays. Most of the windows are casements, with one sash window. The later part has a round-headed doorway with imposts and a semicircular fanlight. The windows are sashes. Inside the original part is an inglenook and a bressumer.	II
Cuckstool Farmhouse; 53.80532°N 2.76033°W	—	18th century	A brick house with a corrugated iron roof in three bays. It is partly on two, partly in 1 1/2, and partly in one storey. The windows are casements, one of which is in a gabled dormer.	II
Hollowforth Hall; 53.82276°N 2.75578°W	—	18th century	A large house that was extended and substantially rebuilt in about 1850, incorporating material from other buildings being demolished. It is in brick with sandstone dressings and a slate roof, and is in Jacobean style. There are two storeys, and four bays on each front. On the garden front are three unequal gables, that on the right (east) dating from the 18th century, and forming a wing. Also on the front is a single-storey porch with a Tudor arched doorway, an embattled parapet, and a crocketed finial. In the centre of the front is a single-storey canted bay window with mullioned and transomed windows and an embattled parapet.	II
Whinnyfield Bridge (No.34); 53.81052°N 2.77457°W		1790s	An accommodation bridge over the Lancaster Canal in sandstone with a humped back. The bridge consists of a single elliptical arch with voussoirs, keystones, and bands. It has parapets with rounded coping, and the ends are curved and pilastered.	II
Bell Fold Bridge (No.35); 53.81525°N 2.76363°W		1790s	The bridge carries the B5269 road over the Lancaster Canal. It is in sandstone, and consists of a single elliptical arch with voussoirs, triple keystones, and bands. The bridge has parapets with rounded coping, and the ends are pilastered.	II
Moon's Bridge (No.36); 53.81856°N 2.75661°W		1790s	The bridge carries Hollowforth Lane over the Lancaster Canal. It is in sandstone, and consists of a single elliptical arch with voussoirs, triple keystones, and bands. The bridge has parapets with rounded coping, and the ends are pilastered.	II
Wearden House; 53.79329°N 2.78820°W	—	Mid to late 19th century	A brick house with sandstone dressings and a slate roof, in two storeys with a symmetrical three-bay front and pilastered corners. The central doorcase has attached Tuscan columns, and above the door is a segmental fanlight. The windows are sashes.	II
