= Margaret Shelton =

Margaret Shelton may refer to:

- Margaret (Madge) Shelton, possible mistress of Henry VIII of England
- Margaret Shelton (artist) (1915–1983), Canadian artist
- Meg Shelton (died 1705), alleged witch
- Margaret Sheldon, one of two known as "Doughnut Girls" (or "Doughnut Dollies"); see National Doughnut Day
