= 2015 Preston City Council election =

2015 UK local government election

Results of the 2015 Preston City Council election

The 2015 by-thirds election to Preston City Council took place on 7 May 2015. It was conducted as a part of the 2015 United Kingdom local elections on the same day (and in the same polling places) as the general election to elect approximately one-third of councillors for a four-year term.

Councillors elected in 2011 Preston City Council election defended their seats this time. Each ward's election can be directly compared with the 2011 elections or indirectly compared looking at councillors' and candidates' correlations in their own party results to the 2014 Preston City Council election.

== Results summary ==
All percentage changes are based on the last election for this group of Councillors, which was the 2011 Preston City Council election.

This election's effects on the composition of the council combined with the totals and percentages of votes for the third elected is as follows:

Preston City Council Election, 2015
Party	Seats	Gains	Losses	Net gain/loss	Seats %	Votes %	Votes	+/−
Labour	32	0	0	0	56	44	23,055	
Conservative	19	0	0	0	33	34	17,778	
Liberal Democrats	5	0	0	0	9	7	3,673	
Independent	0	0	0	0	0	0.3	158	
UKIP	0	0	0	0	0	8	4,014	
Green	0	0	0	0	0	6	3,357	
Deepdale Independent (politician)	1	0	0	0	2	0	N/A	

=== Ashton ===
Preston City Council Elections: Ashton ward, 2015
Party	Candidate	Votes	%	±%
Labour	Mark Routledge	1,001	47.68	−5.92
Conservative	April Dwyer	710	33.82	−3.18
Green	Angela Milne-Picken	264	12.57	N/A
Liberal Democrats	Luke Bosman	124	5.90	−3.54
Majority		291	13.86	−2.79
Turnout		2,099		

=== Brookfield ===
Preston City Council Elections: Brookfield ward, 2015
Party	Candidate	Votes	%	±%
Labour	Nerys Eaves	1,360	51.10	−3.8
UKIP	David Dawson	651	24.46	−8.54
Conservative	Daryl Bamber	552	20.74	+8.64
Green	Kevin Mahy	98	3.68	N/A
Majority		709	26.64	
Turnout		2,661		

=== College ===
Preston City Council Elections: College ward, 2015
Party	Candidate	Votes	%	±%
Conservative	Harry Seddon	886	43.51	−5.79
Labour	John Wilson	836	41.06	+7.16
Green	Martin Pilkington	158	7.76	N/A
Liberal Democrats	Mike Turner	156	7.66	−9.14
Majority		50	2.46	−12.88
Turnout		2,036		

=== Deepdale ===
Preston City Council Elections: Deepdale ward, 2015
Party	Candidate	Votes	%	±%
Labour	Ismail "Issi" Bax	2,000	81.59	+20.99
Green	Geoffrey Cross	233	9.50	N/A
Conservative	Erol Huseynov	218	8.89	N/A
Majority		1767	72.09	+50.8
Turnout		2,451		

=== Garrison ===
Preston City Council Elections: Garrison ward, 2015
Party	Candidate	Votes	%	±%
Conservative	Christine Thomas	1,753	48.64	−4.26
Labour	Gillian Mascord	1,350	37.45	+4.25
Green	Bill Houghton	274	7.60	+1.00
Liberal Democrats	Hans Voges	227	6.29	−1.00
Majority		403	11.19	−8.48
Turnout		3,604		

=== Greyfriars ===
Preston City Council Elections: Greyfriars ward, 2015
Party	Candidate	Votes	%	±%
Conservative	Rowena Edmondson	2,118	55.75	−4.35
Labour	Alan Woods	1,028	27.06	+1.76
Liberal Democrats	Peter Holt-Mylroie	411	10.82	−3.68
Green	Ian McCormick	242	6.37	N/A
Majority		1,090	28.69	−6.11
Turnout		3,799		

=== Ingol ===
Preston City Council Elections: Ingol ward, 2015
Party	Candidate	Votes	%	±%
Liberal Democrats	Jason Jeffrey	922	30.28	−12.42
Labour	John Rochford	909	29.86	−4.44
UKIP	Christopher Rigby	627	20.6	N/A
Conservative	Peter Henry	586	19.25	−3.75
Majority		13	0.43	−8.01
Turnout		3,044		

=== Larches ===
Preston City Council Elections: Larches ward, 2015
Party	Candidate	Votes	%	±%
Labour	Rebecca Yates	1,670	51.51	+4.71
Conservative	Linda Hubberstey	816	25.17	+7.97
Liberal Democrats	Rebecca Finch	499	15.39	−20.61
Green	Kallum Poole	257	7.93	N/A
Majority		854	26.34	+15.54
Turnout		3,242		

=== Lea ===
=

Preston City Council Elections: Lea ward, 2015
Party	Candidate	Votes	%	±%
Conservative	Daniel Dewhurst	1,589	52.12	−0.28
Labour	Lynne Wallace	964	31.62	+9.32
Liberal Democrats	Joe Young	496	16.27	−8.93
Majority		685	22.47	−4.70
Turnout		3,049		

=== Moor Park ===
Preston City Council Elections: Moor Park ward, 2015
Party	Candidate	Votes	%	±%
Labour	David Borrow	1,034	59.29	−13.61
Conservative	Jonty Campbell	278	15.94	−3.76
UKIP	Andrew Watt	251	14.39	N/A
Green	Jonathan Rawstrone	181	10.38	N/A
Majority		756	43.35	−9.84
Turnout		1,744		

=== Preston Rural East ===
Preston City Council Elections: Rural East ward, 2015
Party	Candidate	Votes	%	±%
Conservative	Neil Cartright	1,809	70.89	+5.39
Labour	Gerard Parke-Hatton	743	29.11	+3.71
Majority		1,066	41.77	+1.57
Turnout		2,552		

=== Preston Rural North ===
Preston City Council Elections: Rural North ward, 2015
Party	Candidate	Votes	%	±%
Conservative	Stephen Thompson	2,410	61.57	−10.03
UKIP	Kate Walsh	636	16.25	N/A
Liberal Democrats	Peter Lawrence	570	14.56	+4.06
Labour	George Tait	298	7.61	−10.29
Majority		1,774	45.32	−8.28
Turnout		3,914		

=== Ribbleton ===
Preston City Council Elections: Ribbleton ward, 2015
Party	Candidate	Votes	%	±%
Labour	Brian Rollo	1,588	55.88	−8.32
UKIP	Tony Helps	683	24.03	N/A
Conservative	Stephen Kay	441	15.52	−4.68
Green	Matthew Wilson	130	4.57	N/A
Majority		905	31.84	−12.16
Turnout		2,842		

=== Riversway ===
Preston City Council Elections: Riversway ward, 2015
Party	Candidate	Votes	%	±%
Labour	Peter Moss	1,373	55.81	−15.09
Conservative	Matthew Hargreaves	471	19.15	+5.25
Green	Alasdair Bremner	350	14.23	N/A
UKIP	Maureen Watt	266	10.81	N/A
Majority		902	36.67	−19.13
Turnout		2,460		

=== Sharoe Green ===
Preston City Council Elections: Sharoe Green ward, 2015
Party	Candidate	Votes	%	±%
Conservative	Sonia Gildert	1,471	44.02	−9.18
Labour	Dave Wilson	1,196	35.79	+3.09
Liberal Democrats	Greg Vickers	268	8.02	−6.08
Green	Helen Disley	249	7.45	N/A
Independent	Les Nyogeri	158	4.73	N/A
Majority		275	8.23	−12.27
Turnout		3,342		

=== St Matthews ===
Preston City Council Elections: St Matthews ward, 2015
Party	Candidate	Votes	%	±%
Labour	Javed Iqbal	1,670	73.18	−10.82
UKIP	Mark Kingsley	370	16.21	N/A
Conservative	Sheila Heys	242	10.60	−5.4
Majority		1,300	56.97	−10.93
Turnout		2,282		

=== Town Centre ===
Preston City Council Elections: Town Centre ward, 2015
Party	Candidate	Votes	%	±%
Labour	Yakub Patel	2,002	67.16	+21.46
Conservative	Michael Balshaw	520	17.44	+2.94
Green	Alex Walker	459	15.40	N/A
Majority		1,482	49.71	+43.81
Turnout		2,981		

=== Tulketh ===
Preston City Council Elections: Tulketh ward, 2015
Party	Candidate	Votes	%	±%
Labour	Robert Boswell	1,406	50.12	−8.18
Conservative	Bowen Perryman	655	23.35	+7.35
UKIP	Paul Barker	530	18.89	N/A
Green	Mary Roberts	214	7.63	N/A
Majority		751	26.77	−5.83
Turnout		2,805		

=== University ===
Preston City Council Elections: University ward, 2015
Party	Candidate	Votes	%	±%
Labour	John Swindells	627	55.59	−13.41
Conservative	Stephanie Short	253	22.43	+2.13
Green	Vanessa Silva	248	21.99	N/A
Majority		374	33.16	−15.64
Turnout		1,128		

== See also ==
- Preston (UK Parliament constituency)
