= 1945 Preston Municipal Borough Council election =

1945 UK local government election

Elections to Preston Municipal Borough council were held on 1 November 1945. The Labour Party won a majority on the council, winning 18 of the 23 seats up for election. The composition of the council after the election was 26 Labour members, 14 Conservatives and eight independents, giving the Labour Party a majority of four and control of the council for the first time. According to the Lancashire Evening Post, turnout was low considering the good weather on election day; this was attributed to "apathy and thoughtless neglect to exercise the franchise".

== Results ==
Ashton (2 seats)
Party	Candidate	Votes	%	±%
Independent	J. W. Taylor	2,432	37.3	
Conservative	S. M. Norris	2,110	32.3	
Labour	E. B. Higginson	1,986	30.4	
Labour	C. Sedgewick	1,764		
Turnout		4,236		
Registered electors		6,908		
Independent hold				
Conservative hold				

Avenham (3 seats)
Party	Candidate	Votes	%	±%
Conservative	W. Sharples	1,667	56.1	
Conservative	R. Heaps	1,513		
Conservative	J. F. Gray	1,505		
Labour	F. Hoskins	1,303	43.9	
Labour	B. Wilson	1,262		
Labour	H. Eccleston	1,117		
Turnout		2,922		
Registered electors		5,742		
Conservative hold				
Conservative hold				
Conservative hold				

Christ Church
Party	Candidate	Votes	%	±%
Labour	M. A. Wignall	1,411	55.8	
Conservative	Neville Warburton	1,118		
Turnout		2,546		
Registered electors		4,315		
Labour hold				

Deepdale (2 seats)
Party	Candidate	Votes	%	±%
Labour	R. Quigley	3,681	59.1	
Labour	R. Gillies	3,666		
Conservative	W. Palmour	2,549	40.9	
Conservative	J. H. Blackburn	2,511		
Turnout		6,318		
Registered electors		11,272		
Labour gain from Conservative				
Labour gain from Conservative				

Fishwick (2 seats)
Party	Candidate	Votes	%	±%
Labour	E. Hewitt	2,315	60.3	
Labour	R. Smith	2,216		
Independent	N. Howard	1,526	39.7	
Independent	R. B. Duckworth	1,441		
Turnout		3,782		
Registered electors		6,368		
Labour hold				
Labour hold				

Maudland (2 seats)
Party	Candidate	Votes	%	±%
Labour	J. O'Hagan	2,900	61.9	
Labour	B. Ryder	2,892		
Conservative	R. R. Rainford	1,786	38.1	
Conservative	J. Green	1,747		
Turnout		4,727		
Registered electors		7,782		
Labour gain from Conservative				
Labour gain from Conservative				

Moorbrook
Party	Candidate	Votes	%	±%
Labour	F. Phipps	2,000	57.5	
Labour	C. Tragen	1,950		
Independent	R. A. Heppell	1,480	42.5	
Independent	L. Titterington	1,434		
Turnout		3,481		
Registered electors		5,569		
Labour gain from Independent				
Labour gain from Independent				

Park
Party	Candidate	Votes	%	±%
Labour	G. Gardner	2,879	61.5	
Conservative	R. G. Gray	1,805	38.5	
Turnout		4,804		
Registered electors		8,141		
Labour gain from Conservative				

Ribbleton (2 seats)
Party	Candidate	Votes	%	±%
Labour	T. Singleton	2,982	59.8	
Labour	A. Wilson	2,843		
Conservative	H. Attwater	2,006	40.2	
Conservative	W. Thew	1,888		
Turnout		4,978		
Registered electors		8,731		
Labour hold				
Labour hold				

St John's (2 seats)
Party	Candidate	Votes	%	±%
Labour	W. Beckett	2,488	62.6	
Labour	J. Henry	2,305		
Conservative	Mrs. Starkie	1,488	37.4	
Conservative	J. Titterington	1,408		
Turnout		3,904		
Registered electors		7,518		
Labour hold				
Labour hold				

St Peter's (2 seats)
Party	Candidate	Votes	%	±%
Labour	J. J. Platt	2,314	65.9	
Labour	H. L. Tilley	2,257		
Independent	F. Barwick	1,196	34.1	
Independent	A. H. Rodwell	1,143		
Turnout		3,493		
Registered electors		4,347		
Labour gain from Independent				
Labour gain from Independent				

Trinity (2 seats)
Party	Candidate	Votes	%	±%
Labour	I. Ellison	1,524	62.7	
Labour	J. Norris	1,513		
Conservative	E. Fisher	907	37.3	
Conservative	S. Carvin	903		
Turnout		2,478		
Registered electors		4,569		
Labour gain from Conservative				
Labour hold				
