= 1949 Preston Municipal Borough Council election =

1949 UK local government election

Elections to the Preston Municipal Borough Council were held in late 1949.

== Results ==
Ashton
Party	Candidate	Votes	%	±%
Independent	J Taylor	2,802	68.6	
Labour	K Sharples	1,284	31.4	

Avenham
Party	Candidate	Votes	%	±%
Conservative	E Fisher	1,998	63.6	
Labour	S Whiteside	1,143	36.4	

Christ Church
Party	Candidate	Votes	%	±%
Labour	J Henerey	1,428	51.9	
Conservative	R Rainford	1,321	48.1	

Deepdale
Party	Candidate	Votes	%	±%
Conservative	H Yates	3,750	50.7	
Labour	R Quigley	3,651	49.3	

Fishwick (2 seats)
Party	Candidate	Votes	%	±%
Labour	E Hewitt	2,426	54.3	
Conservative	H Sharples	1,961		
Communist	T Barnes	82	1.8	

Maudland
Party	Candidate	Votes	%	±%
Labour	J Hagan	2,500	52.0	
Conservative	J Hopkinson	2,307	48.0	

Moorbrook
Party	Candidate	Votes	%	±%
Conservative	R Grenfell	2,049	53.8	
Labour	F Phipps	1,758	46.2	

Park
Party	Candidate	Votes	%	±%
Labour	W Hall	2,495	50.3	
Conservative	J Hothersall	2,469	49.7	

Ribbleton
Party	Candidate	Votes	%	±%
Labour	T Singleton	3,750	50.7	
Conservative	H Holden	2,723	44.4	

St Johns
Party	Candidate	Votes	%	±%
Conservative	F Phillips	2,319	51.5	
Labour	H Eccleston	2,181	48.5	

St Peters
Party	Candidate	Votes	%	±%
Labour	W Platt	2,123	55.9	
Independent	W Wilson	1,675	44.1	

Trinity
Party	Candidate	Votes	%	±%
Conservative	W Prescott	1,474	54.8	
Labour	R Gillies	1,215	45.2	
