= 1947 Preston Municipal Borough Council election =

1947 UK local government election

Elections to Preston Municipal Borough council were held on 1 November 1947.

== Results ==
Ashton
Party	Candidate	Votes	%	±%
Conservative	W Hearn	2,698	90.3	
Communist	D Archer	290	9.7	

Avenham
Party	Candidate	Votes	%	±%
Conservative	R Heaps	Unopposed		

Christ Church
Party	Candidate	Votes	%	±%
Labour	M Wignall	1,452	50.3	
Conservative	E Kent	1,433	49.7	

Deepdale
Party	Candidate	Votes	%	±%
Conservative	H Beaumont	4,129	55.0	
Labour	R Gillies	3,299	43.9	
Communist	G Woods	82	1.1	

Fishwick (2 seats)
Party	Candidate	Votes	%	±%
Labour	H Catterall	2,275	50.7	
Labour	R Smith	2,252		
Independent	N Howard	2,215	49.3	
Independent	R Duckworth	2,131		

Maudland
Party	Candidate	Votes	%	±%
Labour	B Ryder	2,529	52.7	
Conservative	H Sharples	2,269	47.3	

Moorbrook
Party	Candidate	Votes	%	±%
Conservative	H Gardner	2,053	52.0	
Labour	C Tragen	1,892	48.0	

Park
Party	Candidate	Votes	%	±%
Conservative	A Wiles	2,614	51.3	
Labour	G Gardner	2,483	48.7	

Ribbleton
Party	Candidate	Votes	%	±%
Labour	F Hoskin	3,171	52.6	
Conservative	J Howson	2,860	47.4	

St Johns
Party	Candidate	Votes	%	±%
Conservative	W Slinger	2,432	54.5	
Labour	J Henery	2,033	45.5	

St Peters
Party	Candidate	Votes	%	±%
Labour	L Short	2,021	51.7	
Independent	W Wilson	1,889	48.3	

Trinity
Party	Candidate	Votes	%	±%
Conservative	T Ainsworth	1,500	52.7	
Labour	I Ellison	1,346	47.3	
