= Meg Shelton =

Alleged English witch

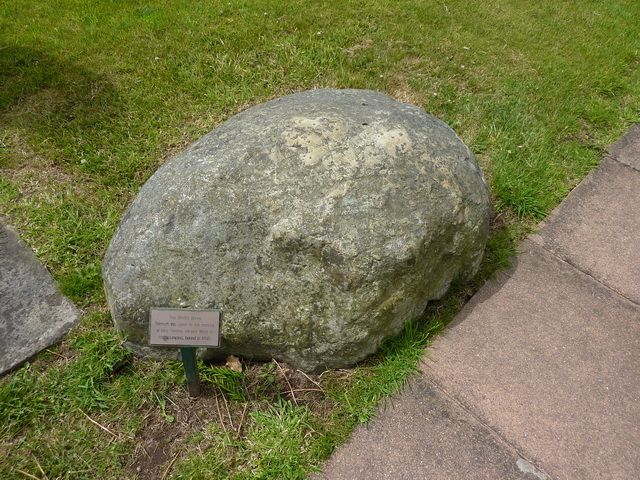
- The Grave of Meg Shelton, St Anne's Church, Woodplumpton
- Born: Margary Hilton
- Died: 1705
- Burial place: St Anne's Church, Woodplumpton

Meg Shelton (died 1705) known as the "Fylde Hag" was an English woman accused of witchcraft. Her grave can be seen at St. Anne's Church in Woodplumpton, now part of the City of Preston district of Lancashire.

Meg Shelton's real name is recorded by St Anne's Church as Margary Hilton. She was found dead in her cottage, crushed between a wall and a large barrel. According to local rumour, she was able to use her magic to make crops fail, turn milk sour and to cause illness in cattle. After her death, it was said that whenever they buried her in the graveyard, every so often her corpse would keep digging up to the surface. To prevent her from rising again, they buried her face down and had a large boulder placed on top of it. An alternative telling suggests that she was buried head down in a narrow shaft, accounting for the relatively small size of the boulder.
