= Fulwood Urban District =

Former local government area in the UK

Fulwood
- Fulwood Urban District in 1950; County Borough of Preston in 1950
- History
  - Origin: Parish of Fulwood
  - Abolished: 1974
  - Succeeded by: Borough of Preston
- Status: Urban district

Fulwood was an urban district of Lancashire, England.

It was subject to some changes in its boundaries:

- 1 April 1934: lost 143 acres (0.58 km^{2}) to County Borough of Preston
- 1 April 1934: gained 1,300 acres (5.3 km^{2}) from Preston Rural District (Ribbleton and parts of Broughton, Lea, Ashton, Ingol and Cottam)
- 1 April 1952: lost 109 acres (0.44 km^{2}) to County Borough of Preston

It was abolished in 1974 and incorporated into the Borough of Preston district.
