= 2024 Preston City Council election =

Local election in Preston, England

- 2 May 2024

16 out of 48 seats to Preston City Council 25 seats needed for a majority
- Turnout: 107,500, 25.9%

| | First party | Second party | Third party |
|---|---|---|---|
| Leader | Matthew Brown | John Potter | Susan Whittam |
| Party | Labour | Liberal Democrats | Conservative |
| Last election | 31 seats, 64.6% | 7 seats, 14.6% | 10 seats, 20.8% |
| Seats before | 31 | 7 | 10 |
| Seats after | 30 | 12 | 6 |
| Seat change | ▼1 | ▲5 | ▼4 |
| Popular vote | 11,222 | 8,094 | 5,961 |
| Percentage | 40.3% | 29.1% | 21.4% |
| Swing | ▼12.2% | ▲3.5% | ▼6.9% |
- Results by ward
Leader before election
Matthew Brown
Labour
Leader after election
Matthew Brown
Labour

The 2024 Preston City Council election took place on 2 May 2024 to elect members of Preston City Council in Lancashire, England. This was on the same day as other local elections across England, and Lancashire's Police and Crime Commissioner election.

As is typical for Preston's council elections, sixteen seats of the forty-eight total were contested. Labour have had majority control of the council for most of the council's existence, including from 2011 following a period of no overall control. Labour retained their control with a comfortable majority at this election. However, the Liberal Democrats enjoyed a successful election, nearly doubling their seat count after taking several seats from the Conservatives and becoming the main opposition in Preston City Council. In addition, in a shock result the Liberal Democrats took a seat from Labour in the Lea and Larches ward, unseating then-cabinet member for health and wellbeing (and acting county council Labour opposition group leader) Jennifer Mein by a mere 13 votes following a recount.

The majority of contested seats were fought only by Labour, the Conservatives and the Liberal Democrats; however in five wards, independent runners or the parties Reform UK and the Trade Unionist and Socialist Coalition also stood although none of these were successful in gaining a seat. Unlike last year, the Green Party did not stand in any seats.

Several wards recorded relatively high numbers of rejected ballots.

Following the election the leader of the Preston Conservatives Sue Whittam announced her resignation as leader due to her appointment as Deputy Mayor.

== Election results ==
Preston City Council's composition following the 2024 elections.

2024 Preston City Council election
| Party | This election | | | Full council | | | This election | | |
| Party | Seats | Net | Seats % | Other | Total | Total % | Votes | Votes % | +/− |
|---|---|---|---|---|---|---|---|---|---|
| Labour | 9 | ▼1 | 56.25 | 21 | 30 | 62.5 | 11,222 | 40.3 | –10.3 |
| Liberal Democrats | 6 | ▲5 | 37.50 | 6 | 12 | 25.0 | 8,094 | 29.1 | +4.8 |
| Conservative | 1 | ▼4 | 6.25 | 5 | 6 | 12.5 | 5,961 | 21.4 | –5.9 |
| TUSC | 0 | 0 | 0.00 | 0 | 0 | 0.0 | 659 | 2.5 | |
| Independent | 0 | 0 | 0.00 | 0 | 0 | 0.0 | 461 | 1.7 | |
| Reform | 0 | 0 | 0.00 | 0 | 0 | 0.0 | 204 | 0.8 | |

== Ward results ==
The Statements of Persons Nominated was released by Preston Council on 8 April 2024 following the close of nominations. The results were announced a day after the election. Incumbent councillors that stood for re-election are marked with an asterisk (*).

=== Ashton Ward ===
Ashton
| Party | Candidate | Votes | % | ±% |
|---|---|---|---|---|
| Labour | James Hull* | 1,012 | 58.8 | −4.0 |
| Liberal Democrats | Rebecca Potter | 369 | 21.5 | +9.8 |
| Conservative | Daniel Duckworth | 339 | 19.7 | −1.5 |
| Rejected ballots | | 41 | 2.3 | |
| Majority | | | | |
| Turnout | | 1,762 | 27.20 | |
| Labour hold | | Swing | | |

=== Brookfield Ward ===
Brookfield
| Party | Candidate | Votes | % | ±% |
|---|---|---|---|---|
| Labour | Sara Holmes | 673 | 66.5 | −5.1 |
| Liberal Democrats | Edward Craven | 198 | 19.6 | +10.9 |
| Conservative | Al-Yasa Khan | 141 | 13.9 | −5.2 |
| Rejected ballots | | 55 | 5.1 | |
| Majority | | | | |
| Turnout | | 1,070 | 18.81 | |
| Labour hold | | Swing | | |

=== Cadley Ward ===
Cadley
| Party | Candidate | Votes | % | ±% |
|---|---|---|---|---|
| Liberal Democrats | Julie van Mierlo | 908 | 48.3 | −7.2 |
| Labour | Jono Grisdale | 497 | 26.4 | −1.0 |
| Conservative | Sarah Hart | 319 | 17.0 | ±0.0 |
| Independent | Paul Balshaw | 156 | 8.3 | N/A |
| Rejected ballots | | 26 | 1.4 | |
| Majority | | | | |
| Turnout | | 1,906 | 29.75 | |
| Liberal Democrats hold | | Swing | | |

=== City Centre Ward ===
City Centre
| Party | Candidate | Votes | % | ±% |
|---|---|---|---|---|
| Labour Co-op | Salim Desai* | 880 | 58.4 | −8.1 |
| Conservative | Andy Pratt | 318 | 21.1 | +5.6 |
| Liberal Democrats | Peter Lawrence | 308 | 20.5 | +11.1 |
| Rejected ballots | | 110 | 6.8 | |
| Majority | | | | |
| Turnout | | 1,616 | 18.95 | |
| Labour Co-op hold | | Swing | | |

=== Deepdale Ward ===
Deepdale
| Party | Candidate | Votes | % | ±% |
|---|---|---|---|---|
| Labour | Siraz Natha* | 849 | 50.9 | −35.4 |
| TUSC | Hasan Tunay | 522 | 31.3 | N/A |
| Liberal Democrats | Jurgen Voges | 176 | 10.6 | +4.0 |
| Conservative | Nilli Williamson | 120 | 7.2 | +1.1 |
| Rejected ballots | | 195 | 10.5 | |
| Majority | | | | |
| Turnout | | 1,863 | 28.13 | |
| Labour hold | | Swing | | |

=== Fishwick and Frenchwood Ward ===
Fishwick and Frenchwood
| Party | Candidate | Votes | % | ±% |
|---|---|---|---|---|
| Labour Co-op | Martyn Rawlinson* | 924 | 61.1 | −10.7 |
| Liberal Democrats | Alana Mullen | 387 | 25.6 | +19.9 |
| Conservative | Ishaq Vaez | 201 | 13.3 | −9.2 |
| Rejected ballots | | 151 | 9.1 | |
| Majority | | | | |
| Turnout | | 1,663 | 27.54 | |
| Labour Co-op hold | | Swing | | |

=== Garrison Ward ===
Garrison
| Party | Candidate | Votes | % | ±% |
|---|---|---|---|---|
| Labour | Peter Kelly* | 967 | 53.8 | −7.8 |
| Liberal Democrats | Claire Craven | 465 | 25.9 | +10.8 |
| Conservative | Lakwinder Singh | 365 | 20.3 | −2.4 |
| Rejected ballots | | 190 | 9.6 | |
| Majority | | | | |
| Turnout | | 1,986 | 30.02 | |
| Labour hold | | Swing | | |

=== Greyfriars Ward ===
Greyfriars
| Party | Candidate | Votes | % | ±% |
|---|---|---|---|---|
| Liberal Democrats | Michael Peak | 1,029 | 47.4 | −1.0 |
| Conservative | Dave Leme Da Silva | 624 | 28.7 | +2.4 |
| Labour | Avery Greatorex | 519 | 23.9 | −1.1 |
| Rejected ballots | | 85 | 3.8 | |
| Majority | | | | |
| Turnout | | 2,257 | 35.73 | |
| Liberal Democrats gain from Conservative | | Swing | | |

=== Ingol and Cottam Ward ===
Ingol and Cottam
| Party | Candidate | Votes | % | ±% |
|---|---|---|---|---|
| Liberal Democrats | Ben Ward | 861 | 43.7 | −5.0 |
| Conservative | Trevor Hart* | 550 | 27.9 | −3.1 |
| Labour | Adam Malik | 354 | 18.0 | −1.3 |
| Reform | David Preston | 204 | 10.4 | N/A |
| Rejected ballots | | 10 | 0.5 | |
| Majority | | | | |
| Turnout | | 1,979 | 26.30 | |
| Liberal Democrats gain from Conservative | | Swing | | |

=== Lea and Larches Ward ===
Lea and Larches
| Party | Candidate | Votes | % | ±% |
|---|---|---|---|---|
| Liberal Democrats | Mark Jewell | 578 | 36.2 | +16.1 |
| Labour | Jenny Mein* | 565 | 35.4 | −28.8 |
| Independent | Ann Cowell | 305 | 19.1 | N/A |
| Conservative | Tracy Slater | 147 | 9.2 | −5.1 |
| Rejected ballots | | 8 | 0.5 | |
| Majority | | | | |
| Turnout | | 1,603 | 25.03 | |
| Liberal Democrats gain from Labour | | Swing | | |

=== Plungington Ward ===
Plungington
| Party | Candidate | Votes | % | ±% |
|---|---|---|---|---|
| Labour | Nweeda Khan* | 838 | 62.1 | −14.0 |
| Conservative | Martin McKeever | 203 | 15.0 | +0.4 |
| Liberal Democrats | Cristina Mylroie | 172 | 12.7 | +4.4 |
| TUSC | Joel Patton | 137 | 10.1 | N/A |
| Rejected ballots | | 41 | 2.9 | |
| Majority | | | | |
| Turnout | | 1,391 | 17.28 | |
| Labour hold | | Swing | | |

=== Preston Rural East Ward ===
Preston Rural East
| Party | Candidate | Votes | % | ±% |
|---|---|---|---|---|
| Conservative | Mark Bell* | 1,056 | 48.5 | −2.2 |
| Labour | Victoria Blundell | 698 | 32.0 | +2.8 |
| Liberal Democrats | Joanne Joyner | 425 | 19.5 | +1.1 |
| Rejected ballots | | 36 | 1.6 | |
| Majority | | | | |
| Turnout | | 2,215 | 28.01 | |
| Conservative hold | | Swing | | |

=== Preston Rural North Ward ===
Preston Rural North
| Party | Candidate | Votes | % | ±% |
|---|---|---|---|---|
| Liberal Democrats | Daniel Guise | 869 | 47.9 | +9.7 |
| Conservative | Keith Middlebrough* | 640 | 35.3 | −8.3 |
| Labour | Taylor Donoughue-Smith | 304 | 16.8 | −2.8 |
| Rejected ballots | | 22 | 1.2 | |
| Majority | | | | |
| Turnout | | 1,835 | 27.48 | |
| Liberal Democrats gain from Conservative | | Swing | | |

=== Ribbleton Ward ===
| Party | Candidate | Votes | % | ±% |
|---|---|---|---|---|
| Labour Co-op | Anna Hindle* | 595 | 65.2 | −7.7 |
| Conservative | Mary Kennedy | 163 | 17.9 | +0.1 |
| Liberal Democrats | Kate Bosman | 155 | 17.0 | +7.7 |
| Rejected ballots | | 28 | 3.0 | |
| Majority | | | | |
| Turnout | | 941 | 16.45 | |
| Labour Co-op hold | | Swing | | |

=== Sharoe Green Ward ===
| Party | Candidate | Votes | % | ±% |
|---|---|---|---|---|
| Liberal Democrats | George Kulbacki | 1,050 | 43.6 | +8.9 |
| Labour | Mark Routledge | 833 | 34.6 | −4.8 |
| Conservative | David Walker* | 523 | 21.7 | −3.8 |
| Rejected ballots | | 76 | 3.1 | |
| Majority | | 217 | | |
| Turnout | | 2,482 | 39.32 | |
| Liberal Democrats gain from Conservative | | Swing | | |

=== St. Matthews Ward ===
| Party | Candidate | Votes | % | ±% |
|---|---|---|---|---|
| Labour Co-op | Suleman Sarwar* | 714 | 64.3 | −16.1 |
| Liberal Democrats | Rene van Mierlo | 244 | 22.0 | +14.1 |
| Conservative | Sohaib Ashraf | 152 | 13.7 | +2.6 |
| Rejected ballots | | 146 | 11.6 | |
| Majority | | | | |
| Turnout | | 1,256 | 20.24 | |
| Labour Co-op hold | | Swing | | |

== By-elections ==
=== Ashton ===
Ashton by-election: 16 October 2025
| Party | Candidate | Votes | % | ±% |
|---|---|---|---|---|
| Liberal Democrats | Ronan Hodgson | 659 | 35.5 | +14.0 |
| Reform | Lee Slater | 548 | 29.5 | N/A |
| Labour | Mark Routledge | 429 | 23.1 | –35.7 |
| Independent | Ann Cowell | 101 | 5.4 | N/A |
| Conservative | Kevin Brockbank | 61 | 3.3 | –16.4 |
| Independent | Aran Bailey | 60 | 3.2 | N/A |
| Majority | | 111 | 6.0 | N/A |
| Turnout | | 1,865 | 28.3 | +1.1 |
| Registered electors | | 6,585 | | |
| Liberal Democrats gain from Labour | | | | |

== Rejected ballots ==
Several wards recorded relatively high numbers of rejected ballots at the 2024 election. Local outlet Blog Preston reported that some spoiled ballot papers in Preston carried the message "No Ceasefire, No Vote", including in Deepdale and Fishwick & Frenchwood. The slogan was also used in wider political campaigning in 2024 for a ceasefire in the Israeli-Gaza War, including a conference held in Blackburn before the local elections. However, the official results published by Preston City Council recorded only the number of rejected ballots by ward and did not state why any ballot was rejected.
