= 1950 Preston Municipal Borough Council election =

1950 UK local government election

Elections to the Preston Municipal Borough Council were held in late 1950.

== Results ==
Ashton
Party	Candidate	Votes	%	±%
Conservative	J Gee	2,480	65.3	
Labour	W Ainsworth	1,317	34.7	

Avenham
Party	Candidate	Votes	%	±%
Conservative	J Gray	Unopposed		

Christ Church
Party	Candidate	Votes	%	±%
Labour	J King	1,616	55.9	
Conservative	A Fitchett	1,275	44.1	

Deepdale
Party	Candidate	Votes	%	±%
Conservative	J Howson	3,529	55.3	
Labour	T Fazackerley	2,850	44.7	

Fishwick
Party	Candidate	Votes	%	±%
Labour	R Smith	2,358	55.7	
Conservative	F Brett	1,877		

Maudland
Party	Candidate	Votes	%	±%
Labour	R Weir	2,388	51.6	
Conservative	H Dyson	2,243	48.4	

Moorbrook
Party	Candidate	Votes	%	±%
Conservative	T Dixon	1,861	51.9	
Labour	W Conroy	1,728	48.1	

Park
Party	Candidate	Votes	%	±%
Labour	M Hill	2,359	50.3	
Conservative	J Hothersall	2,334	49.7	

Ribbleton
Party	Candidate	Votes	%	±%
Labour	H Eccleston	3,708	58.3	
Conservative	R Barnes	2,647	41.7	

St Johns
Party	Candidate	Votes	%	±%
Conservative	A Rainford	2,506	54.6	
Labour	J Lund	2,085	45.4	

St Peters
Party	Candidate	Votes	%	±%
Labour	F Phipps	1,664	44.0	
Conservative	A Harrison	1,664	44.0	

Trinity
Party	Candidate	Votes	%	±%
Labour	J Atkinson	1,286	50.3	
Labour	H Holden	1,271	49.7	
