= County Borough of Preston =

Local government district 1836–1974

Coordinates: 53.758°N 2.703°W

Preston
- Fulwood Urban District in 1950; County Borough of Preston in 1950
- Population
  - 1841: 50,131
  - 1881: 96,532
  - 1961: 113,341
- History
  - Origin: Ancient borough
  - Created: 1836
  - Abolished: 1974
  - Succeeded by: Borough of Preston
- Status: Municipal borough (1836–1889); County borough (1889–1974)
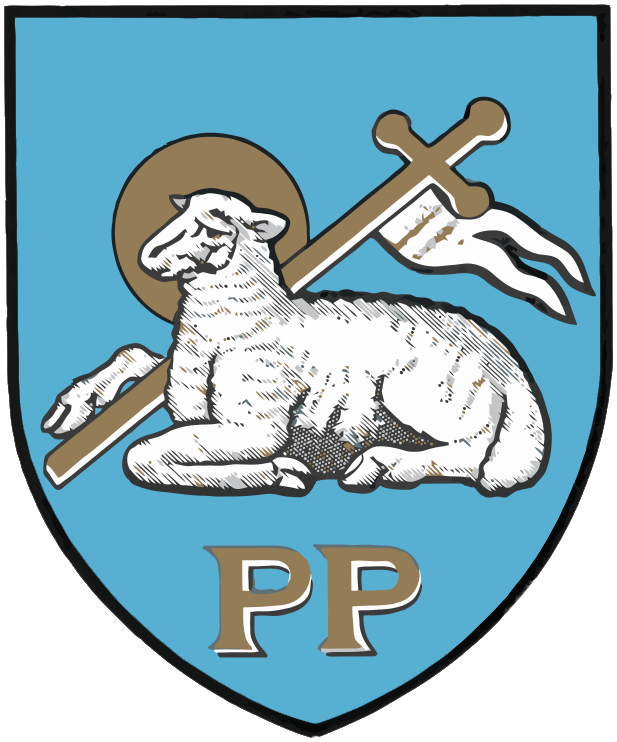

Preston Municipal Borough, also known as the County Borough of Preston from 1889, was a local government district coterminate with the town of Preston in Lancashire, northwest England from 1836 to 1974.

Preston was one of only a few industrial towns in Lancashire to have a functioning corporation in 1835, its charter dating to 1685, and was reformed as a municipal borough by the Municipal Corporations Act 1835.

The Local Government Act 1888 created elected county councils throughout England and Wales. However, any municipal borough with a population of 50,000 or more at the census of 1881 was to be independent of the administration of the county council, with the new status of county borough. Preston, with an 1881 population of 96,532 duly became a county borough on 1 April 1889, outside the jurisdiction of Lancashire County Council.

The county borough's boundaries were widened on three occasions: in 1934, 1952 and 1956.

The county borough was abolished by the Local Government Act 1972 and its territory transferred to Lancashire to be combined with Fulwood Urban District and part of Preston Rural District, becoming the new non-metropolitan district of the Borough of Preston.

== See also ==
- 1945 Preston Municipal Borough Council election
- 1946 Preston Municipal Borough Council election
- 1947 Preston Municipal Borough Council election
- 1949 Preston Municipal Borough Council election
- 1950 Preston Municipal Borough Council election
