= St Anne's Church, Woodplumpton =

Coordinates: 53.8039°N 2.7617°W

St Anne's, Woodplumpton
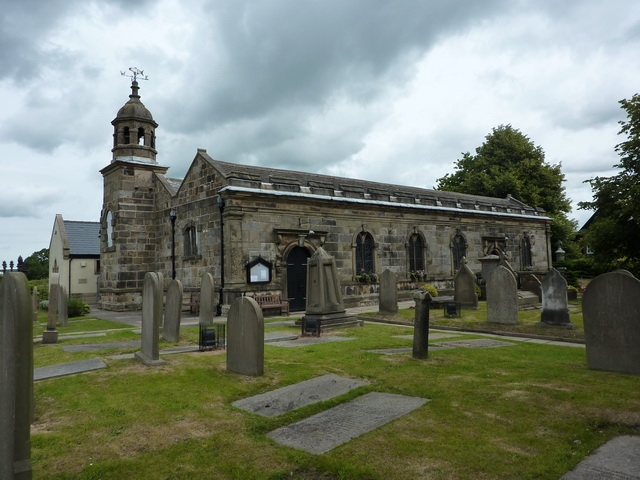

- Location in the City of Preston district
- OS grid reference: SD 49934 34445
- Location: Woodplumpton, Lancashire
- Country: England
- Denomination: Anglican

History
- Status: Parish church

Architecture
- Functional status: Active
- Heritage designation: Grade II*
- Designated: 11 November 1966
- Architect(s): Austin and Paley (additions and restoration 1899–1900)

Administration
- Province: York
- Diocese: Blackburn
- Archdeaconry: Lancaster
- Deanery: Garstang

St Anne's is a church in the village of Woodplumpton in Lancashire, England. It is an active Anglican parish church in the Diocese of Blackburn, the archdeaconry of Lancaster, and the deanery of Garstang. The church is recorded in the National Heritage List for England as a designated Grade II* listed building. The churchyard at St Anne's is the supposed burial place of a 17th-century alleged witch named Meg Shelton.

== History ==
Historically, Woodplumpton was in the ancient parish of St Michael's on Wyre, served by the parish church of St Michael. There is architectural evidence of a chapel at Woodplumpton prior to 1200; documentary evidence of such a structure dates from 1552. The church was largely rebuilt in 1630. The south aisle was added in 1748. In 1899–1900 the Lancaster firm of architects Austin and Paley made additions and carried out a restoration of the church that included installing new windows, re-roofing the north aisle, repairing the arcades, and extending the vestry. The restoration cost £2600, of which £160 was provided by the Manchester Church Building and Endowment Society. In 1966 the church was designated as a Grade II* listed building. The Grade II* listing is for "particularly important buildings of more than special interest".

== Architecture ==
=== Exterior ===
St Anne's sits on high ground in the south of the village. It is constructed of red and yellow sandstone, and of gritstone with sandstone dressings. The roofs are slate and stone slate. Its plan consists of a nave with north and south aisles, chancel, a west tower and a vestry to the north-east. The nave and aisles are all under separate gabled roofs.

The tower has a window with a round head, a square clock face on the south wall, a moulded cornice and a simple Gibbs surround. It is topped by an octagonal cupola with rounded arches. At the top of the cupola is a small stone dome and a weathervane.

=== Interior and fittings ===
There is no structural division between the nave and the chancel; the chancel, which occupies one and a half bays, is enclosed by oak screens. The north arcade has five two-centred, chamfered arches on octagonal piers with moulded caps and bases. The north and south arcades are in the Perpendicular style. The south aisle, 13 feet (4.0 m) wide, is in the Classical style with pilasters, entablature and a moulded cornice. It has a crenellated parapet. The church has two bells, dating from 1596 and 1837.

=== Churchyard ===
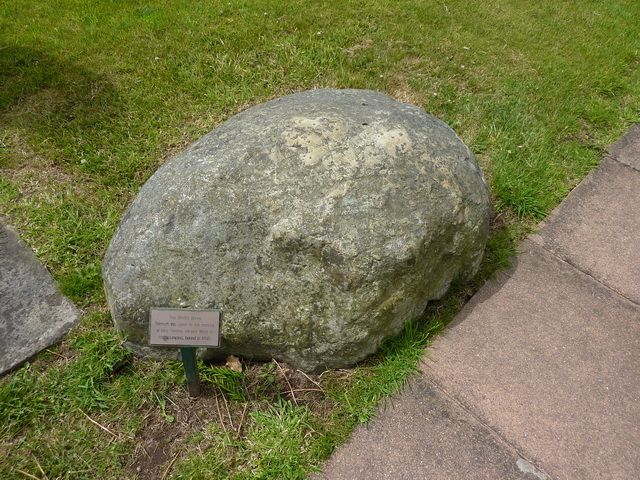
Boulder signifying the grave of "Singleton witch" Meg Shelton

The churchyard lies mostly to the south and west of the church. There are stocks close to the lychgate. These date from the 18th century or earlier, and have been restored. They have two stone shafts with round heads, the right-hand of which is inscribed with the initials "AB". They are designated at Grade II. There is a sundial south of the church. The dial, which sits on an octagonal stone shaft, is dated 1657. The plate and gnomon are brass. The sundial has also been given a Grade II listing. Also associated with the church and listed at Grade II are a gateway dating from the 18th century or earlier, and a mounting block of a similar date. Woodplumpton churchyard is said to be the burial place of an alleged witch, a local 17th-century woman named Meg Shelton who was known as the "Singleton witch" or the "Fylde Hag". According to legend, she was buried upside down to prevent her from escaping. The spot is marked by a boulder. The churchyard also contains the war graves of four British soldiers and a Canadian soldier of World War I, and a Royal Naval Volunteer Reserve officer of World War II.

== See also ==
- Grade II* listed buildings in Lancashire
- Listed buildings in Woodplumpton
