= Preston Town Hall =

Municipal building in Preston, Lancashire, England

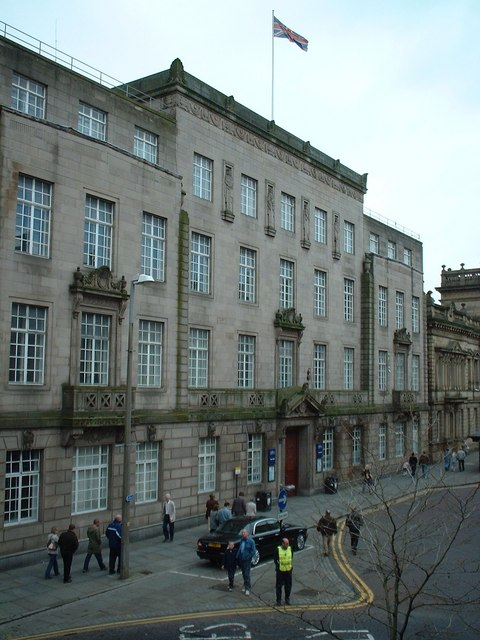
- The current Preston Town Hall (originally the municipal office building)

- Location in city centre Location in Lancashire
- 53.7599°N 2.6988°W
- Location: Lancaster Road, Preston, Lancashire

History
- Built: 1934

Site notes
- Architect: Sir Arnold Thornely
- Architectural style: Neoclassical style

Listed Building – Grade II
- Official name: Town Hall, Lancaster Road
- Designated: 20 December 1991
- Reference no.: 1207297

Preston Town Hall is a municipal building in Lancaster Road in Preston, Lancashire, England. The town hall, which is the headquarters of Preston City Council, is a Grade II listed building.

== First and second town halls ==
The first town hall was a medieval structure built on the south side of the Market Square which collapsed in June 1780. It was replaced by a second town hall which was a brick building built on the same site in 1782 and augmented by a cupola in 1814.

== Third town hall ==
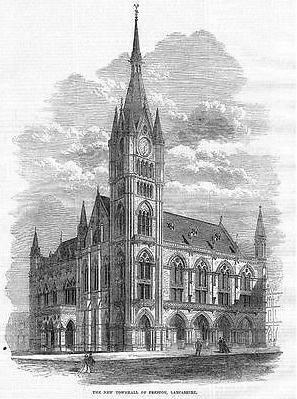
The Town Hall completed in 1867

After significant industrial growth in the first half of the 19th century, particularly in relation to the cotton industry, civic leaders decided to procure a third town hall on the same site. The foundation stone for the new building was laid by the mayor, Robert Townley Parker, on 2 September 1862. It was designed by George Gilbert Scott in the Gothic style, built by Cooper and Tullis of Preston at a cost of £69,412 and was officially opened by the Duke of Cambridge on 3 October 1867. The design involved arcading on the ground floor and tracery windows on the first floor and it featured a tower at the south west corner which was 197 feet (60 m) high. The tower housed a Cambridge-chiming clock by William Potts & Son, with bells by Taylor of Loughborough; at the time it was one of the largest gravity-escapement clocks to have been made in England.

As part of a two-day visit to Lancashire, King George VI and Queen Elizabeth attended a lunch hosted by the Lord Lieutenant of Lancashire, Lord Derby, at County Hall before meeting civic leaders at the town hall in March 1945 during the Second World War.

The town hall burnt down on 15 March 1947 and was subsequently demolished and a modern building known as Crystal House was built on the site in 1962.

== Fourth town hall ==
As the responsibilities of the borough council increased, council leaders decided to procure a municipal office building to provide extra office space for council officers and their departments: the site selected was open ground in Lancaster Road between the police station to the north and the Sessions House to the south. The municipal office building, which was designed by Sir Arnold Thornely in the Neoclassical style was completed in 1934. The design involved a symmetrical main frontage with eleven bays facing onto the Lancaster Road with the last three bays at each end slightly projected forward; the central section of five bays, which rose higher than the end sections, featured a doorway with an architrave and a pediment decorated with acroteria; in each of the sections the centre window on the first floor was equipped with a balcony.

After demolition of the previous town hall, a council chamber was created in the municipal office building which was renamed the Preston Town Hall in 1971. The new town hall continued to be the local seat of government after the enlarged Preston District Council was formed in 1974 and remained its home after the local authority secured city status as Preston City Council in 2002.
