= Woodplumpton =

Village in Lancashire, England

Coordinates: 53.806°N 2.760°W

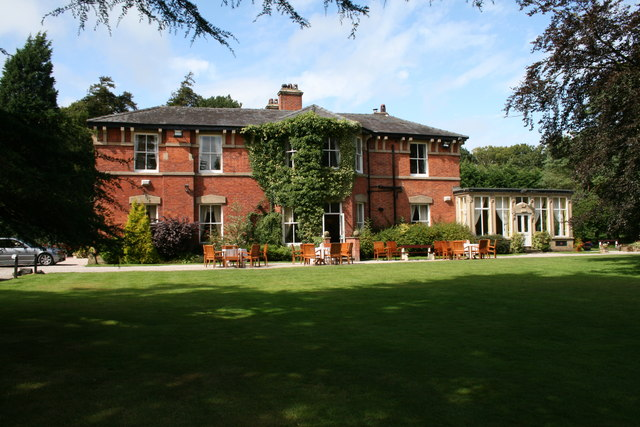
- Bartle Hall

- Shown within the City of Preston district Shown on the Fylde Location within Lancashire
- Population: 4,297 (2021)
- OS grid reference: SD500346
- Civil parish: Woodplumpton
- District: Preston
- Shire county: Lancashire
- Region: North West
- Country: England
- Sovereign state: United Kingdom
- Post town: PRESTON
- Postcode district: PR4
- Dialling code: 01772
- Police: Lancashire
- Fire: Lancashire
- Ambulance: North West
- UK Parliament: Ribble Valley

Civil parishes in the City of Preston
- Barton
- Broughton
- Goosnargh
- Grimsargh
- Haighton
- Ingol & Tanterton
- Lea
- Whittingham
- Woodplumpton

Woodplumpton is a village and civil parish in the City of Preston, Lancashire, England, located 5 miles (8 km) north of Preston.

== Geography ==
It is part of the Fylde, a flat area of land between the Forest of Bowland and the Lancashire coast.

== Community ==
The village contains a primary school, the Wheatsheaf pub and a church. The school is C of E and has a strong link with the church.

St Anne's Church is the location of the grave of Meg Shelton, the notorious Fylde Hag, who was buried there in 1705 after being accused of witchcraft.

== Parish ==
The parish includes the villages of Eaves, Catforth and Lower Bartle. Higher Plumpton is also included in the parish, but like Lower Bartle, is a very small hamlet.

In the 19th century Woodplumpton was known as Plumpton-Wood.

The parish was part of Preston Rural District throughout its existence from 1894 to 1974. In 1974 the parish became part of the Borough of Preston, which became a city in 2002.

== Demography ==
In 1901 the population of the parish was 1,208 and covered 4,970.5 acres. In 2001 it had a population of 2,051, increasing to 2,154 at the 2011 Census. During the 2021 Census the population was 4,297.

== Transport ==
1 bus route runs through the village, the 46 run by vision bus which as of March 2026 runs every hour on a Monday to Saturday and every 2 hours on a Sunday. The route runs between Preston and Longridge via the village.

== Gallery ==
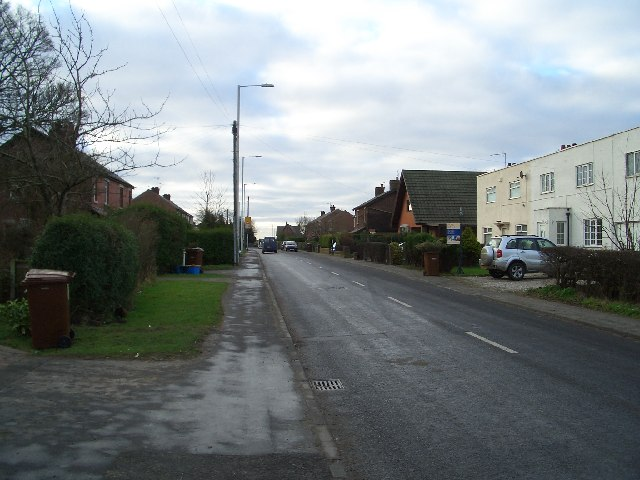
Woodplumpton's main street

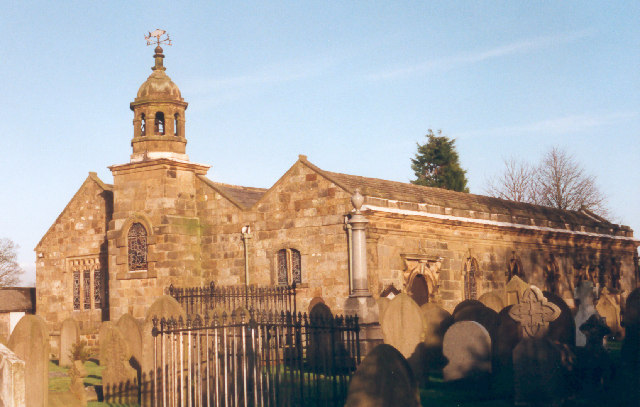
St Anne's Church

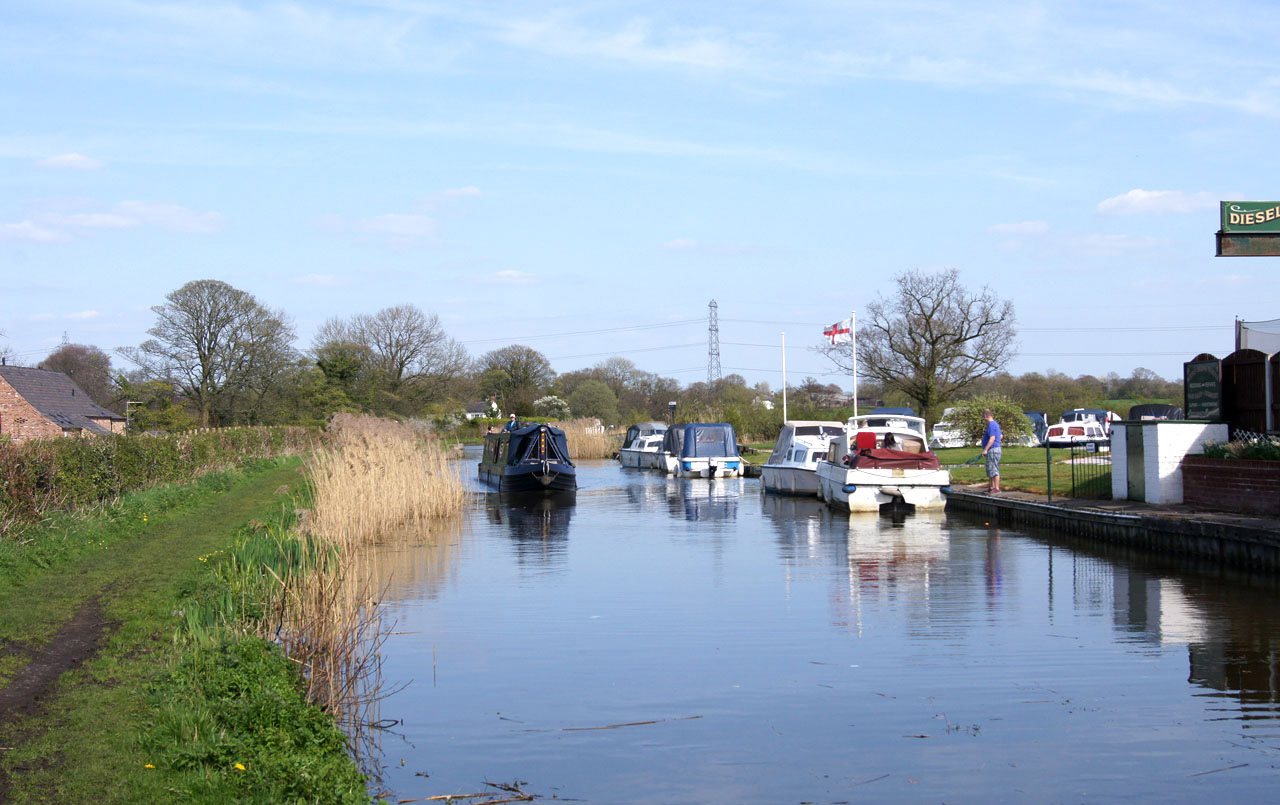
The Lancaster Canal at Woodplumpton

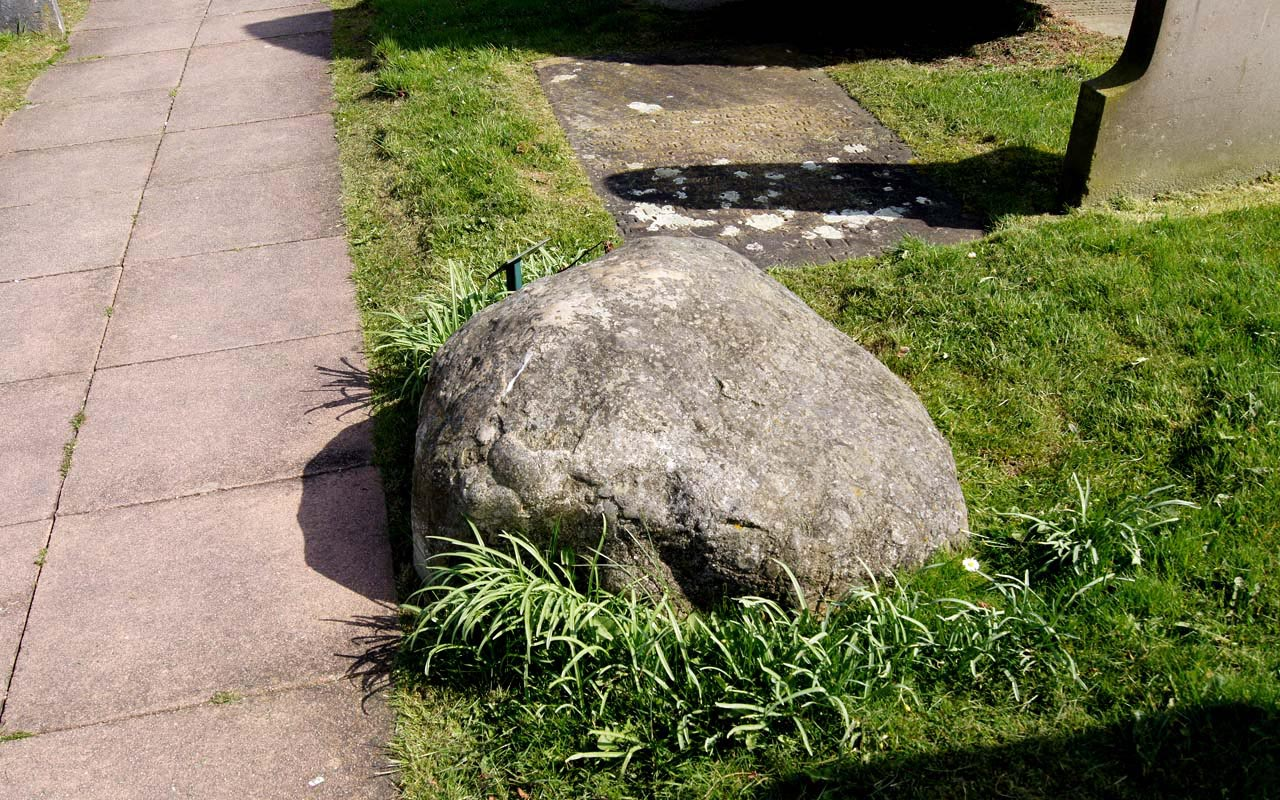
The boulder over the grave of Meg Shelton

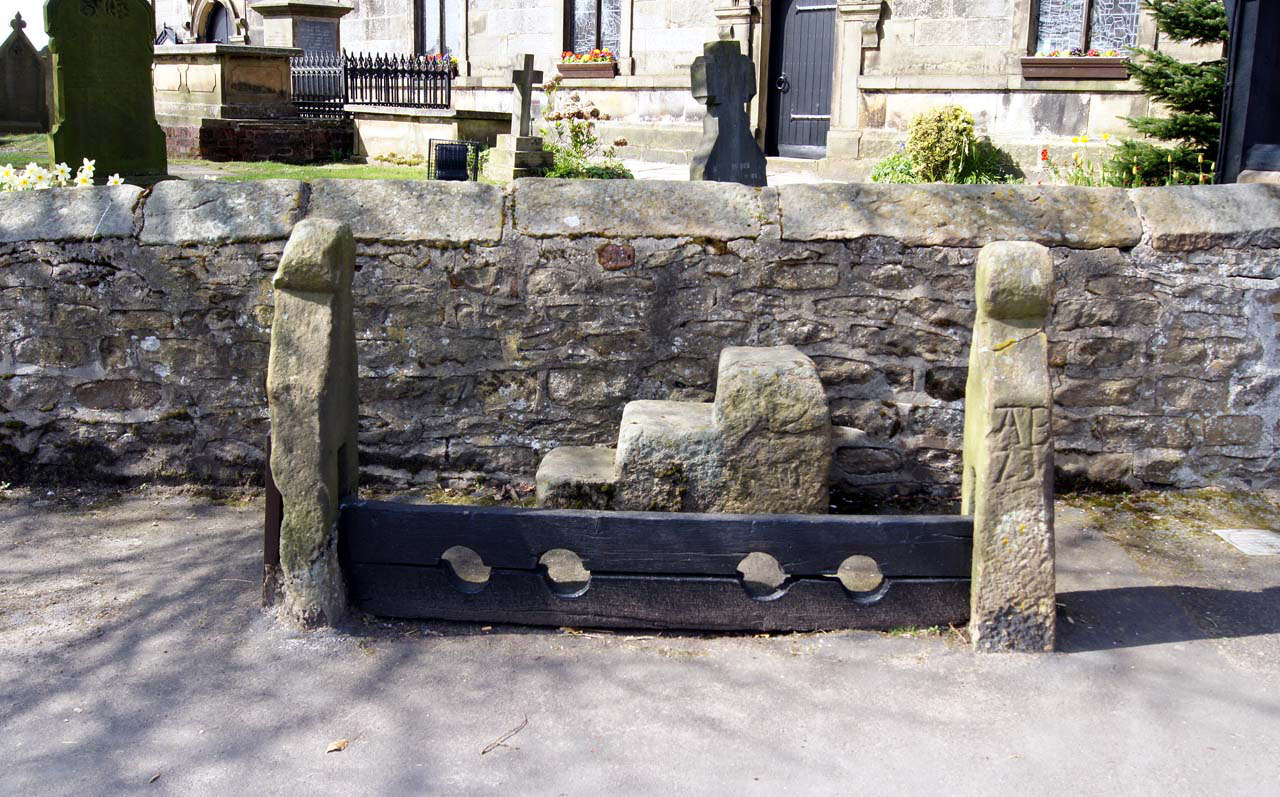
The village stocks

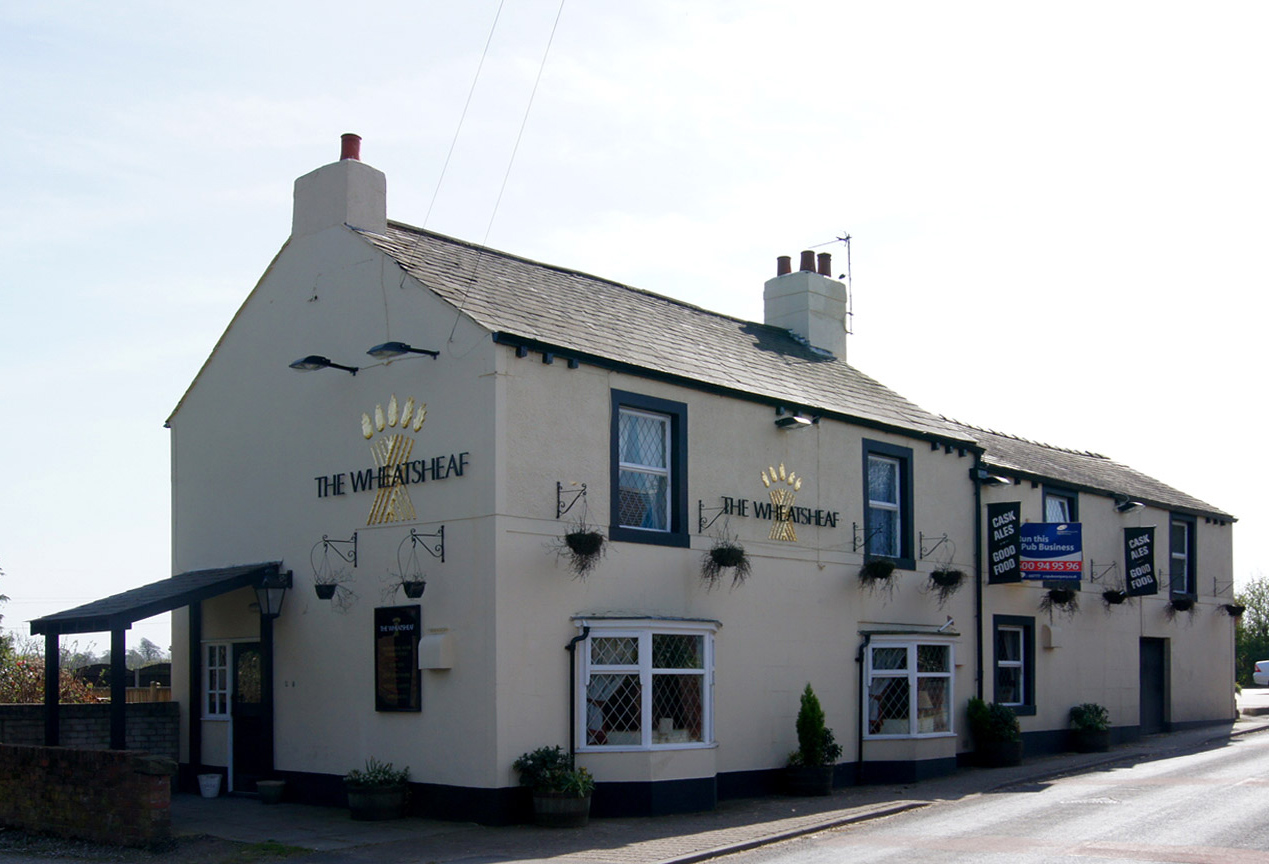
The Wheatsheaf Public House

== See also ==
- Listed buildings in Woodplumpton
