= City of Preston, Lancashire =

City and non-metropolitan district in Lancashire, England

City of Preston
- City & Non-metropolitan district
- Preston
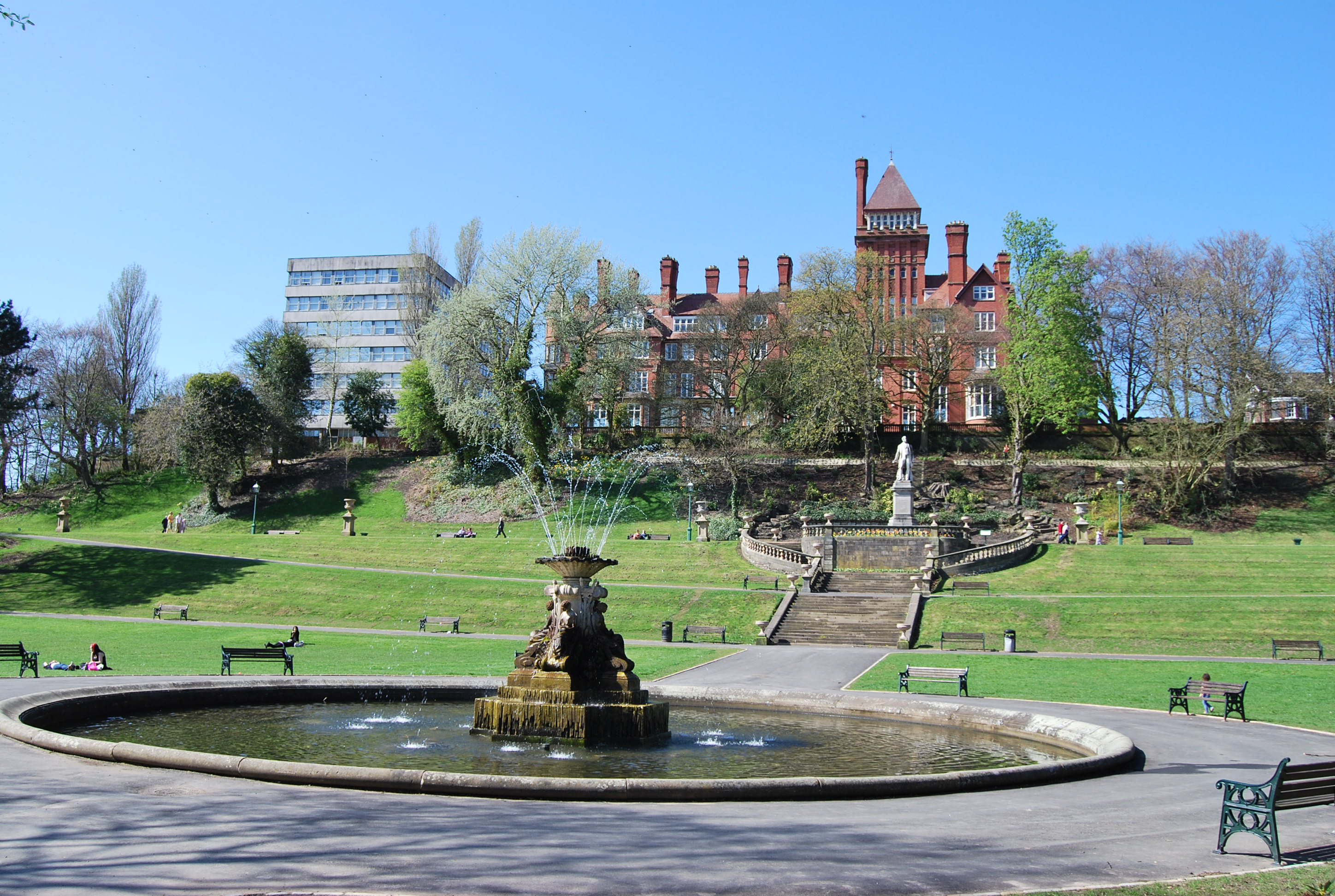
- Miller Park in Preston

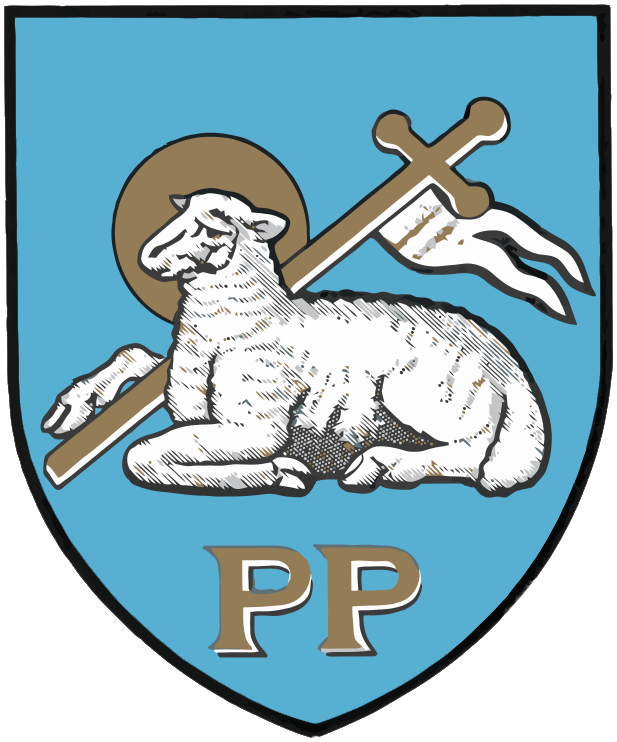
- Coat of Arms of the City Council
- Motto: Prince of Peace (Princeps Pacis)
- Shown within Lancashire and England

- Shown within England
- Coordinates: 53°45′N 2°42′W
- Country: United Kingdom
- Country: England
- Region: North West England
- County: Lancashire
- Guild Merchant charter: 1179
- City status: 2002

Government
  - Type: Non-metropolitan district
  - Local Authority: Preston City Council
  - Leadership: Leader & Cabinet
  - MPs: Mark Hendrick (Lab), Maya Ellis (Lab)

Area
  - City & Non-metropolitan district: 55 sq mi (142 km^{2})
- Highest elevation: 873 ft (266 m)
- Lowest elevation: 0 ft (0 m)

Population (2024)
  - City & Non-metropolitan district: 162,864 (Ranked 131st)
  - Density: 2,970/sq mi (1,145/km^{2})
  - Urban: 365,000 (Central Lancashire)

Ethnicity (2021)
  - Ethnic groups: List: 72.6% White; 20.2% Asian; 3% Mixed; 2.4% Black; 1.9% other

Religion (2021)
  - Religion: List: 47.6% Christianity; 26.3% no religion; 5.4% not stated; 16.1% Islam; 3% Hinduism; 0.7% Sikhism; 0.4% other; 0.3% Buddhism; 0.1% Judaism
- Time zone: UTC+0 (Greenwich Mean Time)
- Postcode: PR1–PR4
- Area codes: 01772, 01995
- ISO 3166-2: GB-LAN
- ONS code: 30UK (ONS); E07000123 (GSS)
- OS grid reference: SD535295
- Demonym: Prestonian

The City of Preston, or simply Preston (/ˈprɛstən/), is a local government district with city status in Lancashire, England. It lies on the north bank of the River Ribble and has a population of 162,864 (2024). The neighbouring districts are Ribble Valley, South Ribble, Fylde and Wyre.

The district is named after its largest settlement, Preston, which lies in the south of the district. The district also includes rural areas to the north of the main urban area, including part of the Forest of Bowland, a designated Area of Outstanding Natural Beauty. In 2002 the district was granted city status to mark the Golden Jubilee of Elizabeth II; prior to this it was known as the Borough of Preston, having held borough status since its creation in 1974.

== History ==
The town of Preston was an ancient borough, having been granted its first charter by Henry II in 1179. The borough was reformed in 1836 to become a municipal borough under the Municipal Corporations Act 1835. When elected county councils were established in 1889 under the Local Government Act 1888, Preston was considered large enough to run its own county-level services and so it became a county borough, independent from Lancashire County Council.

In 1970 the New Town of Central Lancashire was designated, covering all of the county borough of Preston and parts of the districts of Chorley, Fulwood, Leyland, Walton-le-Dale, Chorley Rural District and Preston Rural District. The Central Lancashire Development Corporation was established to oversee the development of the new town, taking over town planning responsibilities from the local councils.

The current district of Preston was formed on 1 April 1974 under the Local Government Act 1972, covering the whole area of two former districts and a large part of a third, which were all abolished at the same time:

- Fulwood Urban District
- Preston County Borough
- Preston Rural District (part, being the parishes of Barton, Broughton, Goosnargh, Grimsargh, Haighton, Lea, Whittingham and Woodplumpton, rest of district split between Ribble Valley and South Ribble.)

The new district was a non-metropolitan district, forming a lower tier of local government with Lancashire County Council providing county-level services. The district was awarded borough status from its creation, allowing the chair of the council to take the title of mayor, continuing Preston's sequence of mayors which dates back to at least the fourteenth century. In other new towns across England the 1974 reforms brought the whole designated area for the new town within a single district, but the Central Lancashire New Town was allowed to straddle the new districts of Preston, South Ribble and Chorley. The Development Corporation was wound up in 1986 and planning powers transferred to the local councils.

In 2002 the borough of Preston was awarded city status to mark the Golden Jubilee of Elizabeth II. The council therefore changed its name from Preston Borough Council to Preston City Council. Like numerous other places granted city status since 1889, Preston has no Anglican cathedral. Instead, following the granting of city status, Preston's parish church was elevated by the Church of England to the status of Minster Church in June 2003.

Under current local government reorganisation plans, all district councils in Lancashire, as well as the county council, will be abolished in 2028, with the district becoming part of a new North Lancashire unitary authority.

== Governance ==
Preston City Council

Leadership
- Mayor: Nweeda Khan, Labour since 20 May 2026
- Leader: Matthew Brown, Labour since 17 May 2018
- Chief Executive: Adrian Phillips since April 2019

Structure
- Seats: 48 councillors
- Graph of the party split among 48 seats.
- Political groups: Administration (21) Labour (21) Other parties (27) Liberal Democrats (14) Reform (5) Conservative (3) Green (2) Independent (3)

Elections
- Last election: May 2026

Meeting place
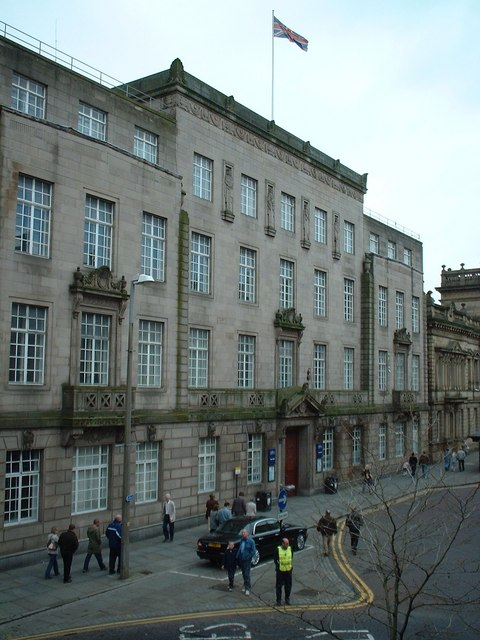
- Town Hall, Lancaster Road, Preston, PR1 2RL

Website
- www.preston.gov.uk

Preston City Council provides district-level services. County-level services are provided by Lancashire County Council. Parts of the district are also covered by civil parishes, which form a third tier of local government.

Entering the city centre from Fylde Road

=== Political control ===
The council went under no overall control at the 2026 election. Labour are the largest party, and run the council as a minority administration.

The first election to the enlarged Preston Borough Council created by the Local Government Act 1972 was held in 1973, initially operating as a shadow authority alongside the outgoing authorities until the new arrangements came into effect on 1 April 1974. Political control of the council since 1974 has been as follows:

Party in control	Years
Labour	1974–1976
Conservative	1976–1980
Labour	1980–1999
No overall control	1999–2011
Labour	2011–2026
No overall control	2026–present

=== Leadership ===
The role of mayor is largely ceremonial in Preston. Political leadership is instead provided by the leader of the council. The leaders since 1974 have been:

Councillor	Party	From	To
Ian Hall	Labour	1974	1976
Joe Hood	Conservative	1976	1980
Ian Hall	Labour	1980	1982
Harold Parker	Labour	1982	May 1992
David Borrow	Labour	May 1992	May 1994
Valerie Wise	Labour	May 1994	Nov 1995
David Borrow	Labour	Dec 1995	1997
Peter Rankin	Labour	1997	2000
Ian Hall	Labour	2000	2003
John Collins	Labour	15 May 2003	16 May 2007
Ken Hudson	Conservative	16 May 2007	May 2011
Peter Rankin	Labour	18 May 2011	May 2018
Matthew Brown	Labour	17 May 2018	

=== Composition ===
Following the May 2026 election, and a subsequent change of allegiance later in May 2026, the composition of the council was:

Party	Councillors
Labour	21
Liberal Democrats	14
Reform	5
Conservative	3
Green	2
Independent	3
Total	48

The next election is due in May 2027.

=== Premises ===
The council is based at Preston Town Hall on Lancaster Road, which was built in 1934 for the old county borough council.

=== Elections ===
Since the last boundary changes in 2019 the council has comprised 48 councillors representing 16 wards, with each ward electing three councillors. Elections are held three years out of every four, with a third of the council (one councillor for each ward) being elected at a time for a four-year term. Lancashire County Council elections are held in the fourth year of the cycle when there are no city council elections.

==== Wider politics ====
Following boundary changes introduced for the 2024 General Election, the City of Preston is divided between two Parliamentary constituencies. The electoral wards of Greyfriars, Preston Rural East, Preston Rural North, and Sharoe Green, form part of the Ribble Valley constituency. The rest of the city forms the Preston constituency.

Between 2010 and 2024, the City of Preston was divided between three Westminster constituencies, namely Preston, Wyre and Preston North, and Fylde.

Historically, Preston has been divided between such constituencies as Preston North, Preston South, and Fylde South, although until 1885 it comprised one constituency called Preston, which actually included most of West Lancashire.

== Geography ==
=== Physical geography ===
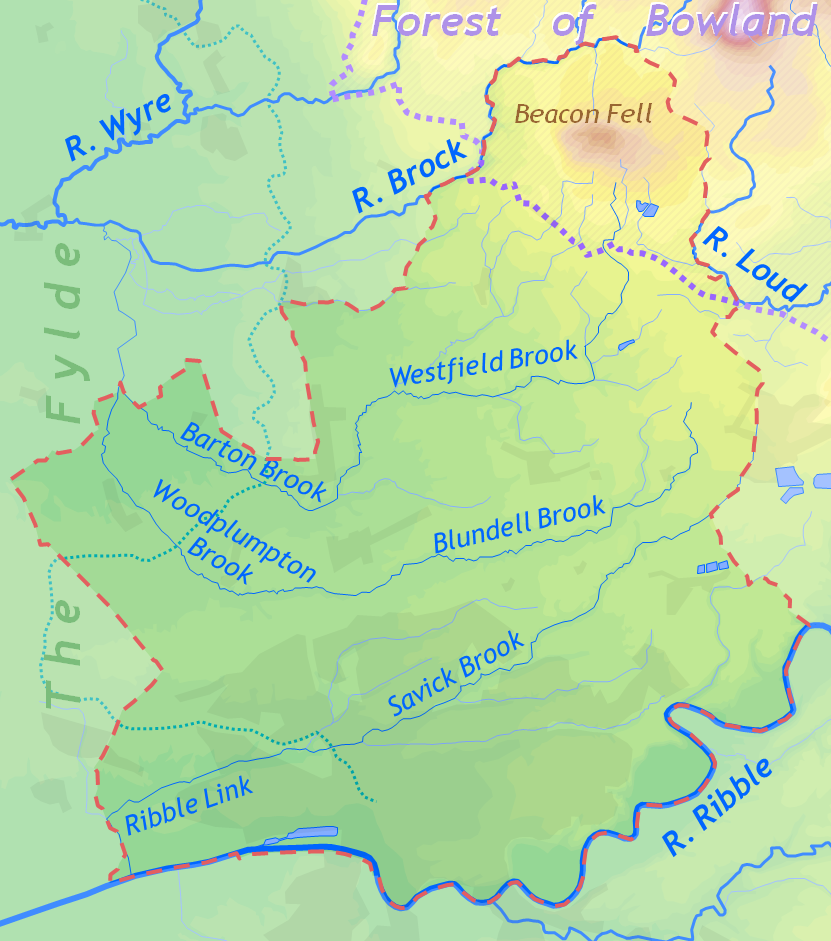
Topography of the City of Preston

The City of Preston district is a transitional region between coastal plain, river valley and moorland. The west of the district lies within the flat coastal plain of the Fylde. The southern border is the River Ribble which meanders through a flood plain in a wide, steep-sided valley. The northeast of the district lies within the Forest of Bowland Area of Outstanding Natural Beauty.

The highest point is the summit of Beacon Fell at 266 m (873 ft) above sea level, an isolated fell two miles south of the main range of Bowland Fells just outside the district boundaries. The lowest point lies on the River Ribble in the southwest corner of the district. The Ribble here is tidal and therefore virtually at sea level. The course of the river west of Preston was artificially straightened in the 19th century, to ease passage of shipping to the docks.

The southern one-third of the district, most of which is covered by Preston and its suburbs, drains into Savick Brook running east-to-west and then turning south into the Ribble. The lowest section of the brook has been widened into the Ribble Link which connects the Lancaster Canal to the Ribble. The central and northern parts of the district drain into south- and west-flowing tributaries of the River Brock, itself a tributary of the Wyre whose estuary is at Fleetwood. The Brock forms part of the district boundary on the west and north sides of Beacon Fell. A small part of the district along the eastern boundary drains into the east-flowing River Loud, a tributary of the Hodder.

The lowland area in the north and east of the district, between Beacon Fell and the Fylde, is a dairy farming area, particularly noted for its cheesemaking dairies. Six of the ten Lancashire Cheese dairies listed on the British Cheese Board's website in 2011 are located in the City of Preston district (and the other four are only a few miles outside). Beacon Fell Traditional Lancashire Cheese is a Protected Designation of Origin cheese named after Beacon Fell.

At 53°45′N 2°42′W, Preston city centre is approximately 27 miles north west of Manchester, 26 miles north east of Liverpool, and 15 miles east of the coastal town Blackpool.

Like most of inland Lancashire, Preston receives a higher than UK average total of rainfall, and is slightly colder. On 10 August 1893 Preston entered the UK Weather Records, with the Highest 5-min total rainfall of 32 mm. As of November 2008 this remains a record.

== Demography ==
Population pyramid of the City of Preston in 2020

=== Ethnicity ===
Preston is a diverse city, although the majority of the ethnic minorities are South Asians, in particular Indians. The ethnic makeup of Preston based on the 2011 census is as follows: 66.1% White British, 0.6% White Irish, 5.6% Other White, 3.0% Mixed Race, 12.9% Indian, 5.1% Pakistani, 0.5% Bangladeshi, 1.2% Other Asian, 0.6% Black Caribbean, 1.6% Black African, 0.6% Other Black, 0.5% Chinese, 0.8% Arab and 1.1% other.

Ethnic Group	1981 estimations		1991		2001		2011		2021	
Ethnic Group	Number	%	Number	%	Number	%	Number	%	Number	%
White: Total	111,083	91%	113,209	89.8%	110,848	85.5%	112,415	80.2%	107,321	72.6%
White: British	–	–	–	–	107,810	83.1%	106,242	75.8%	97,715	66.1%
White: Irish	–	–	–	–	1,539		1,178		923	0.6%
White: Gypsy or Irish Traveller	–	–	–	–	–	–	111		114	0.1%
White: Roma	–	–	–	–	–	–	–	–	248	0.2%
White: Other	–	–	–	–	1,499		4,884		8,321	5.6%
Asian or Asian British: Total	–	–	10,703	8.5%	15,613	12%	21,732	15.5%	29,815	20.2%
Asian or Asian British: Indian	–	–	8,205		11,436		14,421		19,047	12.9%
Asian or Asian British: Pakistani	–	–	1,722		2,746		4,425		7,554	5.1%
Asian or Asian British: Bangladeshi	–	–	176		308		375		758	0.5%
Asian or Asian British: Chinese	–	–	195		546		1,235		707	0.5%
Asian or Asian British: Other Asian	–	–	405		577		1,276		1,749	1.2%
Black or Black British: Total	–	–	1,529	1.2%	1,182	0.9%	1,676	1.2%	3,489	2.4%
Black or Black British: Caribbean	–	–	902		878		865		827	0.6%
Black or Black British: African	–	–	122		216		661		2,355	1.6%
Black or Black British: Other Black	–	–	505		88		150		827	0.6%
Mixed or British Mixed: Total	–	–	–	–	1,737	1.3%	3,326	2.4%	4,367	3.0%
Mixed: White and Black Caribbean	–	–	–	–	950		1,627		1,759	1.2%
Mixed: White and Black African	–	–	–	–	97		300		506	0.3%
Mixed: White and Asian	–	–	–	–	450		931		1,321	0.9%
Mixed: Other Mixed	–	–	–	–	240		468		781	0.5%
Other: Total	–	–	641	0.5%	253	0.2%	1,053	0.8%	2,842	1.9%
Other: Arab	–	–	–	–	–	–	626		1,157	0.8
Other: Any other ethnic group	–	–	641	0.5%	253	0.2%	427		1,685	1.1
Ethnic minority: Total	10,999	9%	12,873	10.2%	18,785	14.5%	27,787	19.8%	40,513	27.4%
Total	122,082	100%	126,082	100%	129,633	100%	140,202	100%	147,834	100%

=== Child poverty ===
In 2008 a survey revealed that 50% of all children living in the city were living in families suffering from financial depression. An estimated 15,380 youngsters were part of the families on the breadline. The Campaign to End Child Poverty report defined children in poverty as children living in homes where occupants work less than 16 hours a week, or not at all, or where the full amount of tax credit is being claimed. The city was one of the most severely affected areas of the North West outside Liverpool and Manchester, with 21% of children in the city living in households which were completely workless and a further 29% in families struggling to get by with working tax credits. The two worst affected areas of the city were the Deepdale and St George's wards, where 75% and 77% of children respectively were said to be living in poverty.

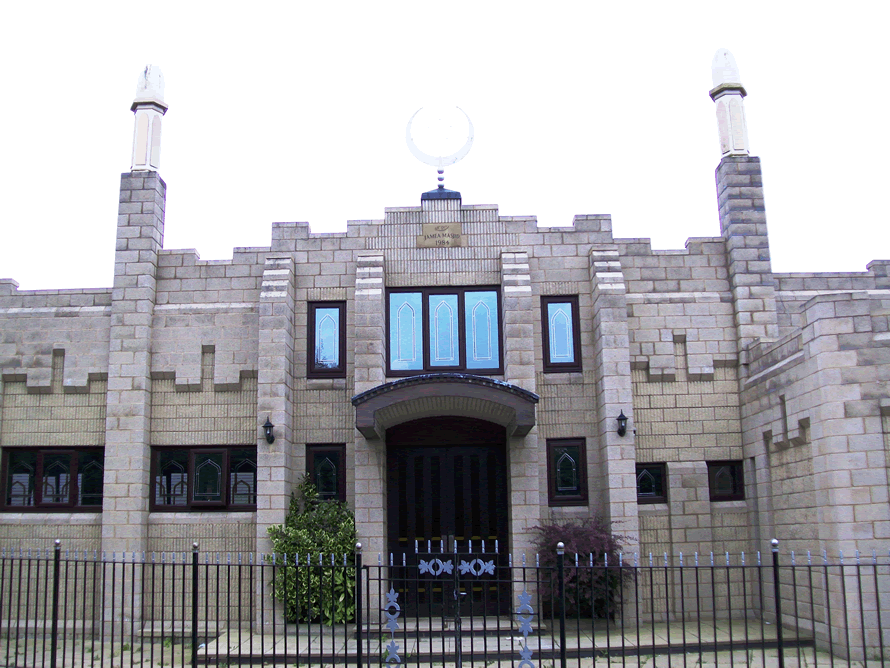
Jamea Masjid close to Preston City Centre

=== Religion ===
The City of Preston lies in the Roman Catholic Diocese of Lancaster and the Anglican Diocese of Blackburn.

In July 2016, St Ignatius Church in Preston, which had been gifted by the Catholic Diocese of Lancaster to the Syro-Malabar Catholic community, was raised to the status of a cathedral by Pope Francis. It now serves as the seat of the Syro-Malabar Catholic Eparchy of Great Britain

The 2001 Census recorded 72% of the population as Christians, 10% as having no religion, and 8% as Muslim. The Hindu and Sikh populations were smaller at 3% and 0.6% respectively, but in both cases this represented the highest percentage of any local authority area in the North West. 2% of the city's population were born in other EU countries.

The 2021 census showed the proportion of respondents describing themselves as Christian as 47.6%, Muslim 16.1%, Hindu 3.0%, Sikh 0.7%, Buddhist 0.3%, Jewish 0.1% and other religions 0.4%. Those choosing no religion comprised 26.3%. The question was not answered by 5.4%.

== Towns and parishes ==
Civil parishes in the City of Preston
- Barton
- Broughton
- Goosnargh
- Grimsargh
- Haighton
- Ingol & Tanterton
- Lea
- Whittingham
- Woodplumpton
Places in the City of Preston district
Forest of Bowland AONB

The main urban area, broadly covering the combined area of the pre-1974 Preston County Borough and Fulwood Urban District, is an unparished area. The remainder of the district is divided into nine civil parishes:

- Barton
- Broughton
- Goosnargh
- Grimsargh
- Haighton
- Ingol and Tanterton (neighbourhood, created April 2012)
- Lea
- Whittingham
- Woodplumpton

== Freedom of the City ==
Freedom of the City has been granted to:

=== Individuals ===
- Sir Tom Finney – 6 September 1979
- Ian Whyte Hall - 21 May 1992
- Joseph Hood - 21 May 1992
- Harold Parker (Guild Mayor 1992) - 21 May 1992
- Nick Park – 25 October 1997
- Andrew Flintoff – 20 January 2006
- Kenneth James Hudson - 21 August 2014
- Lady Milena Grenfell-Baines - 5 February 2015
- Jonathan Saksena - 21 August 2025

=== Organisations and their successors in office ===
- 14th/20th King's Hussars (which is now the King's Royal Hussars) - 6 November 1992
- Parish and Guild Church of St John - 29 November 1992
- University of Central Lancashire - 29 November 1983

=== Adoption of Regiment ===
The Loyal Regiment (North Lancashire) was adopted on 7 August 1952. This was transferred to The Queen's Lancashire Regiment on 9 September 1972, and subsequently transferred to the Duke of Lancaster's Regiment on 1 July 2006.

== See also ==
- Districts of Preston
- List of places in Preston
