= Brampton Ellis Comprehensive School =

Location
- Brampton Road; Brampton Bierlow; Rotherham; England

Information
- Type: Voluntary aided school
- Motto: Latin: Mea Gloria Fides (Faith is my Glory)
- Established: 1930
- Founder: George Ellis
- Closed: 1985
- Local authority: Rotherham
- Gender: Mixed
- Age: 11 to 16

Brampton Ellis Comprehensive School was a secondary school in Brampton Bierlow, Metropolitan Borough of Rotherham, England, open from 1930 until 1985.

== History ==
George Ellis, a prominent resident of Brampton Bierlow, established a trust in 1711 to provide education for the poor in the local area. This led to a junior school being established that year. This was joined by an infant school in 1866 and a senior school in 1930. The senior school eventually became Brampton Ellis Comprehensive School.

Brampton Ellis Comprehensive School closed in 1985, with most of the students transferring to the nearby Wath Comprehensive School.

The infant and junior schools both survived and merged in June 2014 to form Brampton The Ellis C of E Primary School.

== Notable alumni ==
=== Brampton Ellis Senior School ===
- George Robledo, footballer
- Ted Robledo, footballer

=== Brampton Ellis Secondary Modern School ===
- Roger Stone (councillor), Leader from 2003-14 of Rotherham Metropolitan Borough Council
