= 2024 United Kingdom local elections =

Elections in England and Wales

- 2 May 2024

107 of 369 councils in England All seats in the London Assembly 11 directly elected mayors 37 Police and Crime Commissioners in England and Wales
- Turnout: 30%
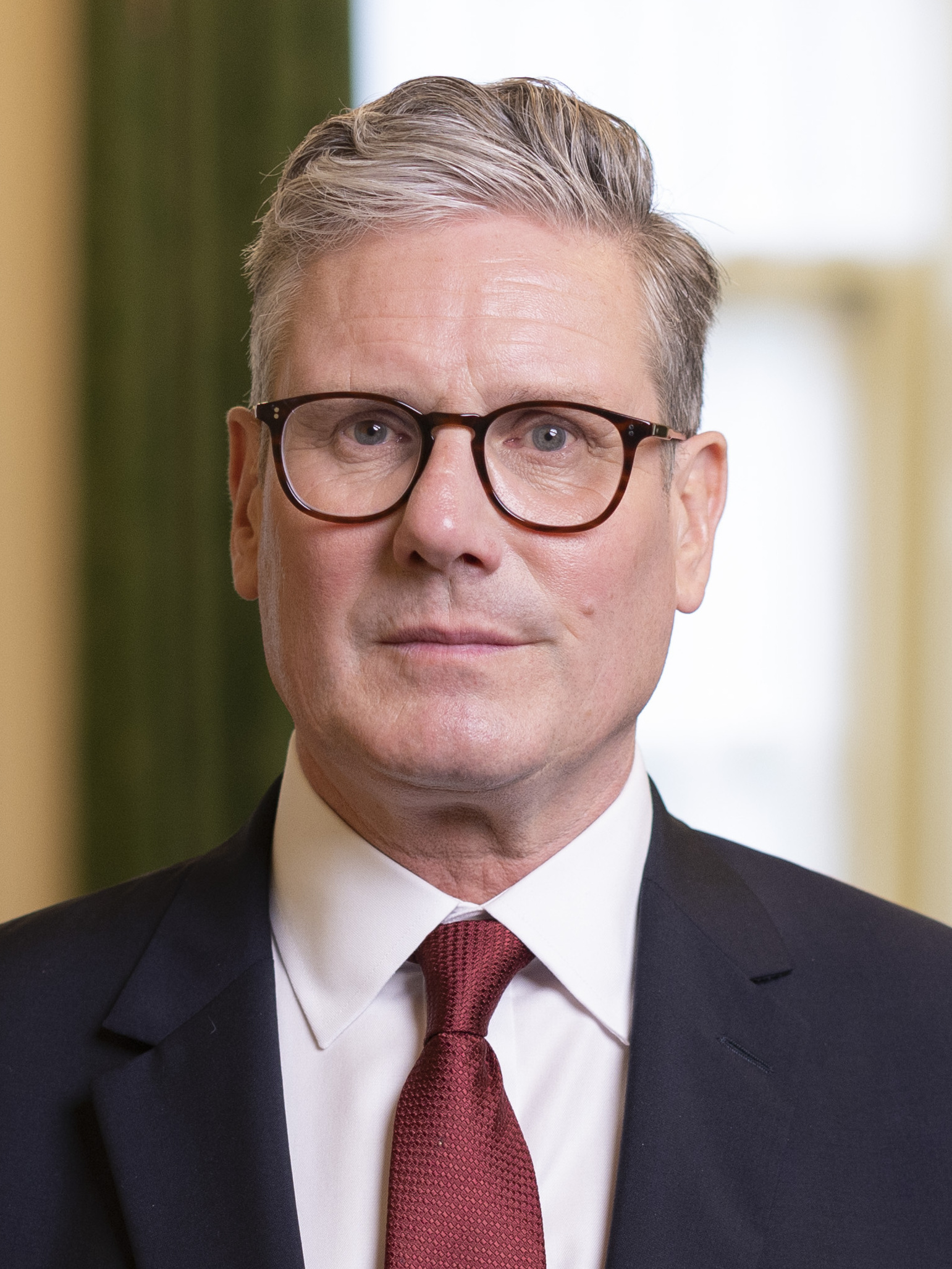

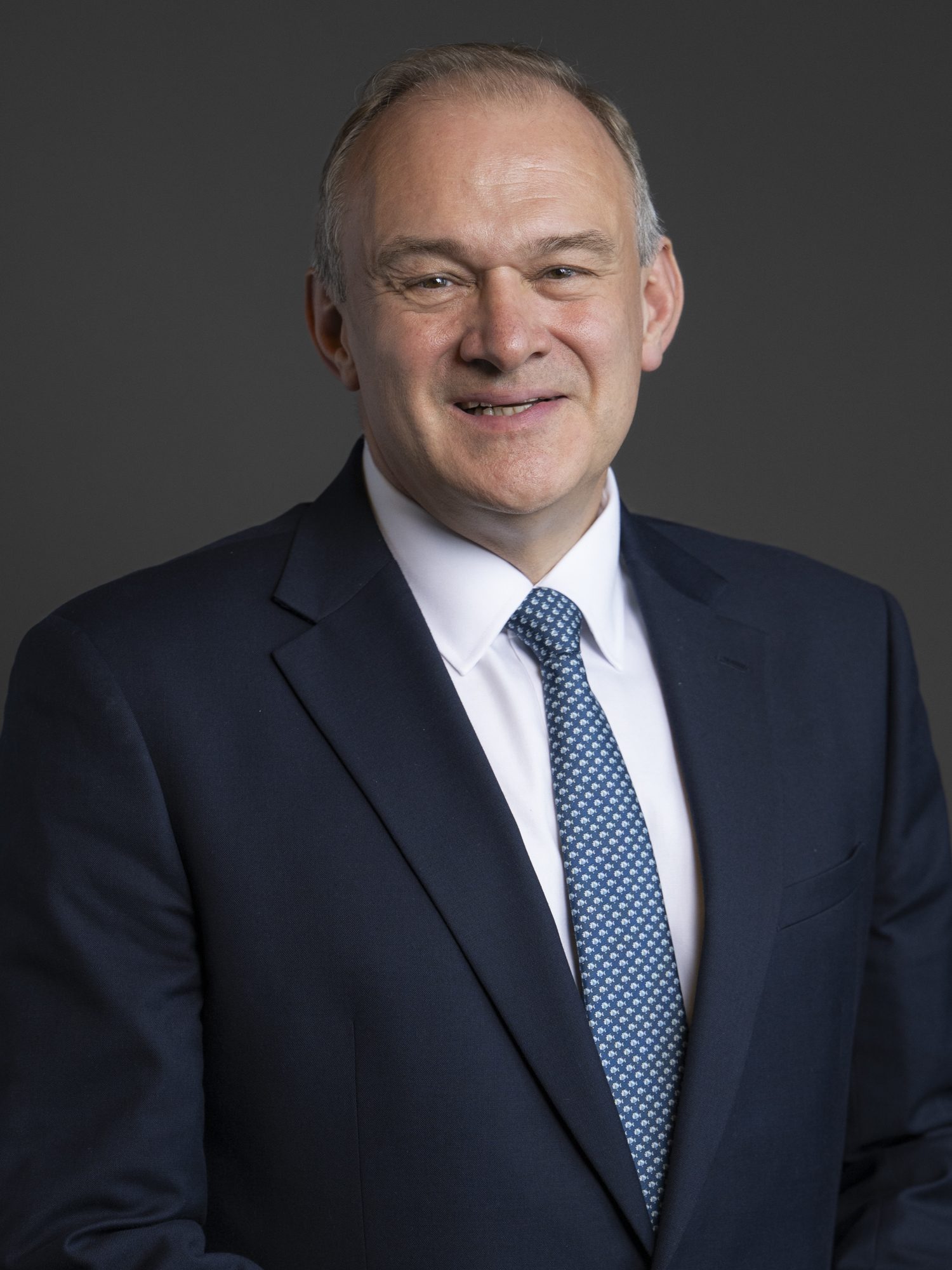

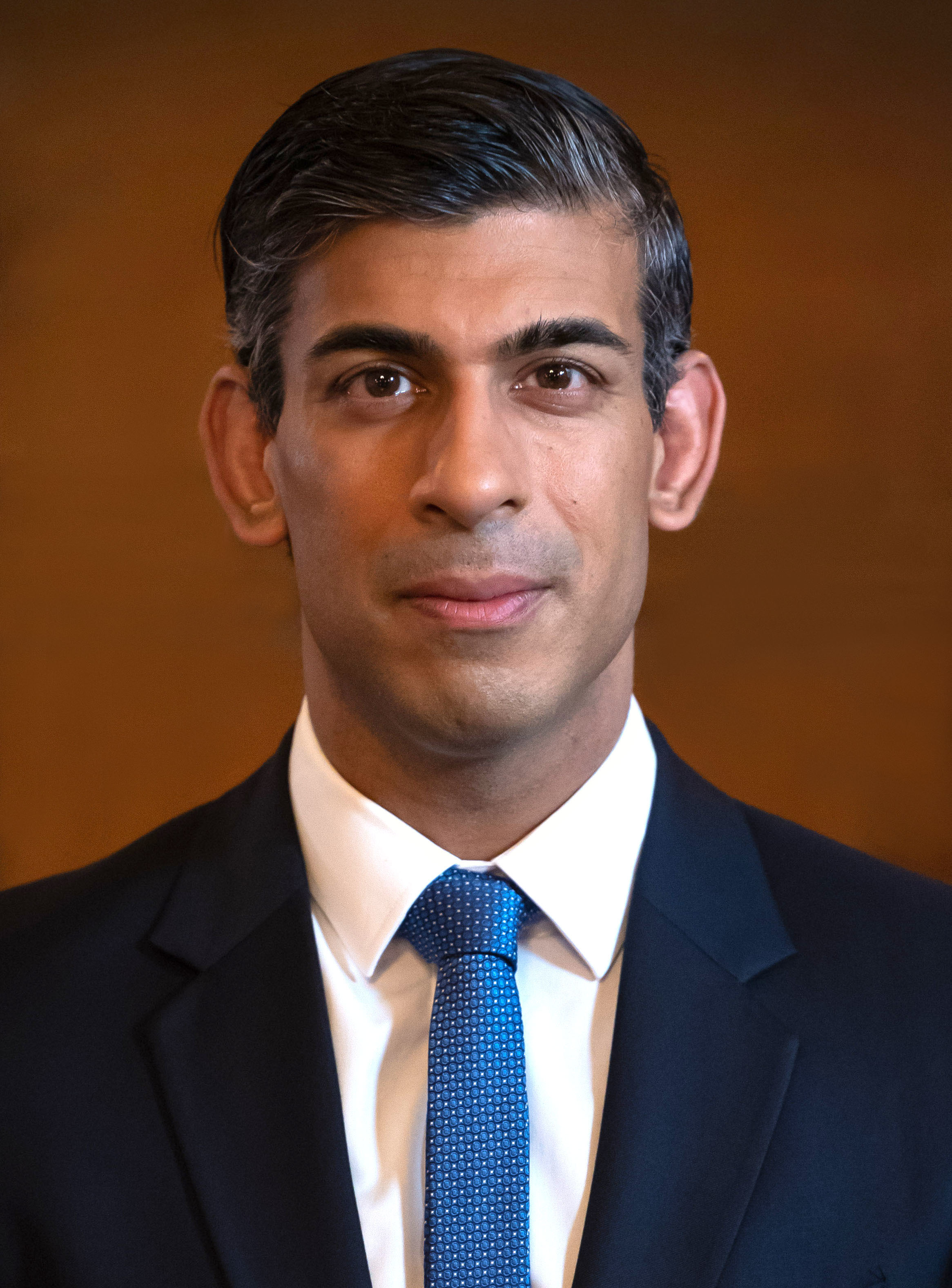

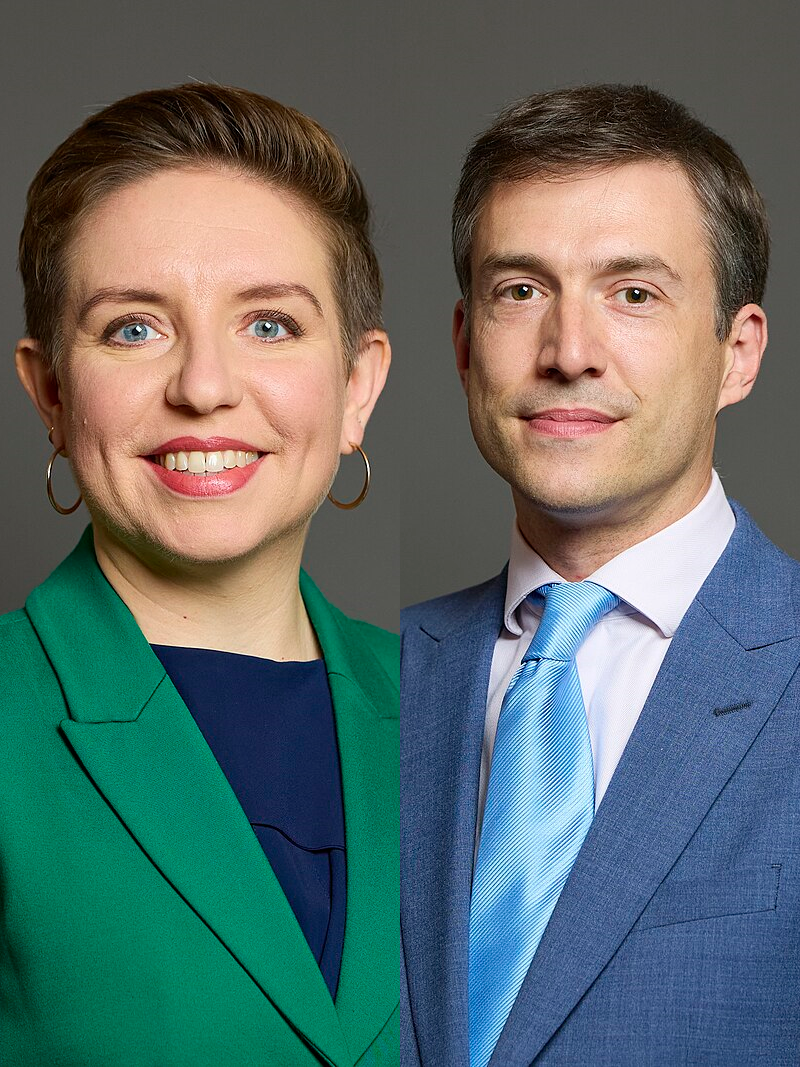
	First party	Second party
Leader	Keir Starmer	Ed Davey
Party	Labour	Liberal Democrats
Leader since	4 April 2020	27 August 2020
Seats before	6,318 seats 99 councils	2,982 seats 35 councils
Projected vote share (Note: All vote shares are projected national vote shares calculated by the BBC.)	34% ▼1%	17% ▼3%
Seats won (2024)	1,159; 51 councils	522; 12 councils
Councillors (after)	6,570; 107 councils	3,090; 37 councils
Net change (notional)	▲187 ▲8 councils	▲104 ▲2 councils
	Third party	Fourth party
Leader	Rishi Sunak	Carla Denyer and Adrian Ramsay
Party	Conservative	Green
Leader since	24 October 2022	1 October 2021
Seats before	5,531 seats 76 councils	772 seats 1 council
Projected vote share	25% ▼1%	13% ▲1%
Seats won (2024)	515; 6 councils	181; 0 councils
Councillors (after)	5,158; 66 councils	838; 1 council
Net change (notional)	▼474 ▼10 councils	▲74; 0 councils
- Map showing party control of councils following the elections.: No election; otherwise see analysis table

Local elections in the United Kingdom took place on 2 May 2024 to choose 2,658 councillors on 107 councils in England, 11 directly elected mayors in England, the 25 members of the London Assembly, and 37 police and crime commissioners in England and Wales. The 2024 Blackpool South parliamentary by-election was held on the same day. These local elections were the last set of routine elections before the 2024 general election which would be called 20 days later. No local elections were held in Scotland or Northern Ireland.

This election cycle returned to its usual four-year cycle after the majority of these elections were last held in the 2021 local elections, having been delayed by a year from 2020 due to the COVID-19 pandemic. The results were a strong showing for the Labour Party, who finished first at the expense of the governing Conservative Party, who finished third and suffered their worst local election defeat since 1996, losing over 400 council seats. The Liberal Democrats finished second for the first time in a local election cycle since 2009.

== Background ==
=== Significance of these elections ===
When local elections were held in 2021 the Conservative Party made gains, mainly at the expense of the Labour Party. In the remaining years that proceeded the 2024 general election, the Conservative Party had several high-profile political scandals and crises and saw a decrease in their popularity in opinion polling. This was reflected in the poor results for the Conservative Party at both the 2022 and 2023 local elections. As a result of the 2023 local elections, Labour became the party with most members elected to local government for the first time since 2002.

These were the second set of local elections held under the Elections Act 2022, a controversial voter identification law that requires voters to show photo ID when attending a polling station. This act also meant that the mayoral and police and crime commissioner elections would use a first-past-the-post voting system rather than the previously used supplementary vote system.

These local elections were the last set of routine elections before the general election. For this reason, the results were speculated by the media to influence both the date the general election would be scheduled for and the election strategies for each party.

Some Conservatives suggested framing the London Mayoral election as a de facto referendum on the ULEZ, which could impact parties' attitudes towards environmental policy.

In late 2023, Labour suggested persistently high interest rates were going to cause a surge in mortgage costs affecting 630,000 homeowners who would re-mortgage between then and the local elections in May. They described the situation as a "financial time-bomb" and implied this would influence the electorate in the elections.

Lord Hayward suggested that community activists and smaller parties may drain support away from the three main parties due to the directions of those parties and because the Liberal Democrats "are no longer the obvious choice for voters disillusioned with the two main parties".

As the elections neared, there were suggestions that Prime Minister Rishi Sunak's leadership would be challenged if the results went poorly for his party, particularly if the Conservatives lost either the West Midlands or Tees Valley mayoralties. Sunak quickly sought to insist to his own MPs that he would still be the Prime Minister after these elections, even if the results were poor for his party.

Deputy Prime Minister Oliver Dowden insisted that the 2024 local elections would be safe from cyberattacks whilst discussing Chinese state-linked hacking.

=== Predictions ===
In March 2024, The Observer reported that the Conservative Party was expected to lose half its seats at this election, explaining that most of these seats were won at the peak of the "vaccine bounce". Conservative Party chairman Richard Holden also cited the "vaccine bounce" as a reason to expect these elections to be "much tougher" for his party than the last time they were contested.

Also in March 2024, Lewis Baston, a political analyst and author, posted that his analysis showed the Conservative Party was due to lose over 50% of their seats which are not changing boundaries. He found that of 613 seats being defended, they would lose 328 based on the swing seen in the 2023 local elections, but would gain eight elsewhere. However, after more work, by 1 April 2024 he said he thought the Conservatives wouldn't lose half their seats because one third of the seats up for election were not last fought in the 2021 local elections, but were actually fought in tougher elections in 2019, 2022, and 2023.

Analysts Michael Thrasher and Colin Rallings also said the Conservative Party was expected to lose half its seats at this election if a similar result to 2023 was repeated. They said the Conservatives would lose around 500 seats while Labour would gain around 300 and the Liberal Democrats and Green Party would both make gains.

Sky News' Sam Coates quoted Michael Thrasher's prediction that the Conservatives would lose around 500 seats while Labour would gain around 350, but added that they consider Gloucester Council likely to switch directly from Conservative to Liberal Democrat-controlled.

YouGov conducted an MRP poll on 14–29 April 2024. They said their key findings were that they "expected Labour to make significant gains across the country, but that stories will emerge from specific local authorities which could leave every party with pleasing news". They predicted Labour to gain control of Hyndburn and Milton Keynes councils from no overall control, and to make significant gains in North East Lincolnshire, Peterborough, Thurrock, and Walsall. The Conservatives were expected to make gains in Reigate and Banstead.

== Campaign ==
Aggregate seats contested by party
Party	Seats
Conservative	2,512 / 2,655 (95%)
Labour	2,427 / 2,655 (91%)
Liberal Democrats	1,802 / 2,655 (68%)
Green	1,646 / 2,655 (62%)
Reform UK	323 / 2,655 (12%)

Both Labour and the Conservatives were defending just under 1,000 seats each, the Liberal Democrats about 400 and the Greens just over 100.

=== Liberal Democrats ===
On 20 March 2024, the Liberal Democrats launched their local election campaign in Harpenden, Hertfordshire where Ed Davey turned a giant hourglass which revealed the words "Time's running out Rishi!". Davey said he was confident of toppling the "Tory Blue Wall in Surrey".

=== Conservative ===
On 22 March 2024, Rishi Sunak launched the Conservative's local election campaign by appearing at a bus depot in Heanor, Derbyshire, alongside East Midlands mayoral candidate Ben Bradley. Due to "human error" 13 of the 35 Conservative candidates were invalidly nominated for Castle Point Borough Council seats, meaning they would not appear on the ballot.

=== Labour ===
On 28 March 2024, Keir Starmer and Angela Rayner launched Labour's campaign for the local elections at an event in Dudley. Starmer's speech mentioned the levelling-up policy of the government in the Black Country.

=== Green ===
The Green Party of England and Wales officially launched its national campaign at an event in Bristol on 4 April 2024. Co-leaders Carla Denyer and Adrian Ramsay gave speeches at the event with a focus on affordable housing.

== Results ==
=== Overall ===
The table below shows the results of these elections, along with the overall number of councillors in Great Britain for each party following the elections.

Party	Councillors			Councils		
Party	Won	After	+/- (Note: Because the number of council seats shifts every year due to boundary changes and local government reorganisation, changes are notional changes calculated by the BBC.)	Won	After	+/-
Labour	1,159	6,570	▲187	51	107	▲8
Conservative	515	5,158	▼474	6	66	▼10
Liberal Democrats	522	3,090	▲104	12	37	▲2
Green	181	838	▲74	0	1	Steady
SNP	—N/a (Note: There were no elections in Scotland in 2024.)	426	Steady	0	1	Steady
Plaid Cymru	—N/a (Note: There were no elections in Wales in 2024.)	204	Steady	0	4	Steady
Aspire	—N/a (Note: Aspire only contests elections in Tower Hamlets; there were no elections in Tower Hamlets in 2024.)	24	Steady	0	1	Steady
Reform	2	14	▲2	0	0	Steady
Independent	278	2,293	▲110	1	12	▲1
No overall control	—N/a			37	141	▼1

=== By party ===
The Conservatives suffered the worst defeat at a local election by a government since 1996, losing over 450 seats. The Conservatives only retained control of 6 out of the 107 councils; Broxbourne, Solihull, Walsall, Epping Forest, Fareham and Harlow. Their only mayoral success was the re-election of Ben Houchen as Tees Valley Mayor.

Labour won the newly created mayoralties of East Midlands Combined County Authority and the York and North Yorkshire Combined Authority. Labour's Richard Parker gained the West Midlands Combined Authority from Andy Street.

BBC analysis of the 2024 United Kingdom local election results said that Labour vote share had fallen 21 percentage points in council wards where more than 20% of residents are Muslim and analysis by Number Cruncher Politics found that Labour lost 33 percentage points in majority-Muslim areas.

The Liberal Democrats gained Tunbridge Wells council and Dorset Council, resulting in the party finishing in second place ahead of the governing Conservative Party. They have added more council seats than any other party over the last parliament, gaining more than 750 in the last five years, largely in southern England.

The Greens had their best ever local election result. However, they were unable to win a majority in Bristol City council, missing a majority of seats by two, while staying the largest party in the council.

The Workers Party of Britain won four seats: two in Rochdale, one in Manchester, and one in Calderdale.

Reform UK underperformed nationally but did win two seats on Havant Borough Council.

The Women's Equality Party won a seat on Basingstoke and Deane Borough Council, their first ever borough seat in the UK in their nine-year history.

The Social Democratic Party won their third seat on the Leeds City Council in the Middleton Park ward, defeating the sitting Labour councillor.

=== Results analysis ===
Analysis by party
Party	Councillors		Councils	
Party	Number	Diff.	Number	Diff.
Labour	1,159	▲187	51	▲8
No overall control	—N/a		37	▼1
Liberal Democrats	522	▲104	12	▲2
Conservative	515	▼474	6	▼10
Independent	202	▲67	0	Steady
Green	181	▲74	0	Steady
Residents	48	▲11	0	Steady
PIP	24	▲8	1	▲1 (Note: Despite holding a majority in Castle Point, the PIP formed a coalition with the CIIP.)
Post-election vacancy	24		—N/a	
Workers Party	4	▲4	0	Steady
Reform	2	▲2	0	Steady
SDP (Note: The BBC includes the SDP and the WEP in the Independents tally)	1	▲1	0	Steady
Women's Equality	1	▲1	0	Steady

Projected proportion of aggregate votes
Party	BBC			Sky News	
Party		Diff. from			Diff. from
Party		2023	2021		2023
Labour	34%	▼1	▲5	35%	▼1
Conservative	25%	▼1	▼11	26%	▼3
Liberal Democrats	17%	▼3	▲1	16%	▼2
Others	24%	▲5	▲6	22%	▲5

=== Post-election vacancies ===
A single seat remained vacant following the elections, resulting in a post election vacancy and subsequent countermanded election:

- Coventry City Council, Radford ward, death of candidate.

== England ==
=== Summary ===
The table below shows the results of these elections, along with the overall number of councillors in England for each party following the elections.

Party	Councillors			Councils		
Party	Won	After	+/-	Won	After	+/-
Labour	1,159	5,710	▲187	51	98	▲8
Conservative	515	4,740	▼474	6	66	▼10
Liberal Democrats	522	2,937	▲104	12	37	▲2
Green	181	802	▲74	0	1	Steady
Aspire	—N/a	24	Steady	0	1	Steady
Reform	2	14	▲2	0	0	Steady
Independent	278	1,869	▲110	1	9	▲1
No overall control	—N/a			37	104	▼1

=== Metropolitan boroughs ===
There are thirty-six metropolitan boroughs, which are single-tier local authorities. Thirty of them elect a third of their councillors every year for three years, with no election in each fourth year. These councils hold their elections on the same timetable, which includes elections in 2024. Rotherham Metropolitan Borough Council has held its elections on a four-year cycle from 2016, so was also due to hold an election in 2024.

Due to boundary changes, some other councils which generally elect their councillors in thirds would elect all of their councillors in 2024.

==== Elections for all councillors ====
Council	Seats	Party control		Details
Council	Seats	Previous	Result	Details
Dudley (Note: New electoral boundaries)	72	Conservative	No overall control	Details
North Tyneside	60	Labour	Labour	Details
Rotherham	59	Labour	Labour	Details
All 3 councils	191			

==== Elections for one third of councillors ====
By-elections or uncontested wards can cause the seats up for election to be above or below one third of the council.

Council	Seats		Party control		Details
Council	up	of	Previous	Result	Details
Barnsley	21	63	Labour	Labour	Details
Bolton	21	60	No overall control (Labour minority)	No overall control	Details
Bradford	30	90	Labour	Labour	Details
Bury	17	51	Labour	Labour	Details
Calderdale	17	51	Labour	Labour	Details
Coventry	17	54	Labour	Labour	Details
Gateshead	22	66	Labour	Labour	Details
Kirklees	23	69	Labour	No overall control	Details
Knowsley	15	45	Labour	Labour	Details
Leeds	33	99	Labour	Labour	Details
Manchester	33	96	Labour	Labour	Details
Newcastle upon Tyne	27	78	Labour	Labour	Details
Oldham	20	60	Labour	No overall control	Details
Rochdale	20	60	Labour	Labour	Details
Salford	21	60	Labour	Labour	Details
Sandwell	24	72	Labour	Labour	Details
Sefton	22	66	Labour	Labour	Details
Sheffield	29	84	No overall control	No overall control	Details
Solihull	17	51	Conservative	Conservative	Details
South Tyneside	18	54	Labour	Labour	Details
Stockport	21	63	No overall control	No overall control	Details
Sunderland	25	75	Labour	Labour	Details
Tameside	19	57	Labour	Labour	Details
Trafford	21	63	Labour	Labour	Details
Wakefield	22	63	Labour	Labour	Details
Walsall	20	60	Conservative	Conservative	Details
Wigan	25	75	Labour	Labour	Details
Wolverhampton	20	60	Labour	Labour	Details
All 28 councils	620	1845			

=== Unitary authorities ===
There are sixty-two unitary authorities, which are single-tier local authorities. Fifteen of them elect a third of their councillors every year for three years, with no election in each fourth year. These councils hold their elections on the same timetable, which includes elections in 2024. Two unitary authorities hold all-out elections on a four-year cycle that includes 2024, and the recently established Dorset Council held its first election in 2019, with its next election in 2024 and subsequent elections every four years from 2029.

==== Elections for all councillors ====
Council	Seats	Party control		Details
Council	Seats	Previous	Result	Details
Bristol	70	No overall control (Labour minority)	No overall control (Green/Lib Dem coalition)	Details
Dorset	82	Conservative	Liberal Democrats	Details
Warrington	58	Labour	Labour	Details
Wokingham	54	No overall control	No overall control	Details
All 4 councils	264			

==== Elections for one third of councillors ====
Council	Seats		Party control		Details
Council	up	of	Previous	Result	Details
Blackburn with Darwen	17	51	Labour	Labour	Details
Halton	18	54	Labour	Labour	Details
Hartlepool	12	36	No overall control	Labour	Details
Hull	19	57	Liberal Democrats	Liberal Democrats	Details
Milton Keynes	19	57	No overall control	Labour	Details
North East Lincolnshire	12	42	Conservative	No overall control	Details
Peterborough	23	60	No overall control	No overall control	Details
Plymouth	19	57	Labour	Labour	Details
Portsmouth	14	42	No overall control	No overall control	Details
Reading	16	48	Labour	Labour	Details
Southampton	17	51	Labour	Labour	Details
Southend-on-Sea	17	51	No overall control	No overall control	Details
Swindon	20	57	Labour	Labour	Details
Thurrock	17	49	No overall control	Labour	Details
All 14 councils	240	712			

=== District councils ===
There are 164 district councils, which are the lower tier local authorities in a two-tier system, with county councils above them. Forty-eight elect their councillors in thirds and seven elect their councillors in halves. Three district councils elect all their councillors on a four-year cycle that includes 2024, with North Hertfordshire changing from the thirds system for the first time. Due to boundary changes, some other councils which usually elect their councillors in thirds or halves elected all of their councillors in 2024.

==== Elections for all councillors ====
Council	Seats	Party control		Details
Council	Seats	Previous	Result	Details
Basildon	42	Conservative	No overall control	Details
Brentwood	39	No overall control	No overall control	Details
Cannock Chase	36	No overall control	Labour	Details
Castle Point	39	No overall control	PIP	Details
Cheltenham	40	Liberal Democrats	Liberal Democrats	Details
Epping Forest	54	Conservative	Conservative	Details
Fareham	32	Conservative	Conservative	Details
Gloucester	39	Conservative	No overall control	Details
Harlow	33	Conservative	Conservative	Details
Havant	36	Conservative	No overall control	Details
Maidstone	49	No overall control	No overall control	Details
North Hertfordshire	51	No overall control	No overall control	Details
Nuneaton and Bedworth	38	Conservative	Labour	Details
Redditch	27	Conservative	Labour	Details
Rossendale	30	Labour	Labour	Details
Stevenage	39	Labour	Labour	Details
Stroud	51	No overall control	No overall control	Details
Tandridge	43	No overall control	No overall control	Details
Tunbridge Wells	39	No overall control	Liberal Democrats	Details
Worcester	35	No overall control	No overall control	Details
All 20 councils	792			

==== Elections for half of councillors ====
Council	Seats		Party control		Details
Council	up	of	Previous	Result	Details
Adur	16	29	Conservative	Labour	Details
Gosport	15	28	Liberal Democrats	Liberal Democrats	Details
Hastings	16	32	No overall control	No overall control	Details
Oxford	25	48	No overall control	No overall control	Details
All 4 councils	72	137			

==== Elections for one third of councillors ====
Council	Seats		Party control		Details
Council	up	of	Previous	Result	Details
Basingstoke and Deane	18	54	No overall control	No overall control	Details
Broxbourne	10	30	Conservative	Conservative	Details
Burnley	15	45	No overall control	No overall control	Details
Cambridge	14	42	Labour	Labour	Details
Cherwell	16	48	No overall control	No overall control	Details
Chorley	14	42	Labour	Labour	Details
Colchester	18	51	No overall control	No overall control	Details
Crawley	12	36	Labour	Labour	Details
Eastleigh	12	39	Liberal Democrats	Liberal Democrats	Details
Elmbridge	16	48	No overall control	No overall control	Details
Exeter	13	39	Labour	Labour	Details
Hart	12	33	No overall control	No overall control	Details
Hyndburn	12	35	No overall control	Labour	Details
Ipswich	18	48	Labour	Labour	Details
Lincoln	11	33	Labour	Labour	Details
Mole Valley	14	39	Liberal Democrats	Liberal Democrats	Details
Norwich	13	39	No overall control	No overall control	Details
Pendle	12	33	No overall control	No overall control	Details
Preston	16	48	Labour	Labour	Details
Reigate and Banstead	16	45	No overall control	No overall control	Details
Rochford	13	39	No overall control	No overall control	Details
Rugby	14	42	No overall control	No overall control	Details
Runnymede	14	41	No overall control	No overall control	Details
Rushmoor	13	39	Conservative	Labour	Details
St Albans	21	56	Liberal Democrats	Liberal Democrats	Details
Tamworth	10	30	No overall control	Labour	Details
Three Rivers	13	39	Liberal Democrats	Liberal Democrats	Details
Watford	12	36	Liberal Democrats	Liberal Democrats	Details
Welwyn Hatfield	16	48	No overall control	No overall control	Details
West Lancashire	16	45	Labour	Labour	Details
West Oxfordshire	17	49	No overall control	No overall control	Details
Winchester	14	45	Liberal Democrats	Liberal Democrats	Details
Woking	11	30	Liberal Democrats	Liberal Democrats	Details
Worthing	13	37	Labour	Labour	Details
All 34 councils	479	1403			

=== Mayoral and council leader elections ===
==== Mayor of London ====
Labour incumbent Sadiq Khan was re-elected for a third four-year term, with 43.8% of the vote.

==== Combined authority mayors ====
Nine combined authority mayors were up for election. Labour won eight of the mayoral elections, including gaining the West Midlands mayoralty from the Conservatives. The Conservatives held Tees Valley.

Combined authority	Previous mayor	Elected mayor	Details
East Midlands	New position	Claire Ward (Labour Co-operative) new	Details
Greater Manchester	Andy Burnham (Labour Co-operative)	Andy Burnham (Labour Co-operative) hold	Details
Liverpool City Region	Steve Rotheram (Labour)	Steve Rotheram (Labour) hold	Details
North East	New position (Note: The North East Mayoral Combined Authority replaced both the non-mayoral North East Combined Authority and the North of Tyne Combined Authority, whose mayor was Jamie Driscoll until this election)	Kim McGuinness (Labour Co-operative) new	Details
South Yorkshire	Oliver Coppard (Labour Co-operative)	Oliver Coppard (Labour Co-operative) hold	Details
Tees Valley	Ben Houchen (Conservative)	Ben Houchen (Conservative) hold	Details
West Midlands	Andy Street (Conservative)	Richard Parker (Labour Co-operative) gain	Details
West Yorkshire	Tracy Brabin (Labour Co-operative)	Tracy Brabin (Labour Co-operative) hold	Details
York and North Yorkshire	New position	David Skaith (Labour Co-operative) new	Details

==== Single-authority mayors ====
One single-authority mayor was up for election.

Local authority	Previous mayor	Elected mayor	Details
Salford	Paul Dennett (Labour)	Paul Dennett (Labour) hold	Details

=== Police and crime commissioner elections ===
All 33 police and crime commissioners (PCC; or police, fire, and crime commissioners) in England were up for election. Labour gained ten commissioner positions from the Conservatives.

Constabulary	Previous PCC	Elected PCC	Details
Avon and Somerset Police	Mark Shelford (Con)	Clare Moody (Labour Co-op)	Details
Bedfordshire Police	Festus Akinbusoye (Con)	John Tizard (Labour Co-op)	Details
Cambridgeshire Constabulary	Darryl Preston (Con)	Darryl Preston (Con)	Details
Cheshire Constabulary	John Dwyer (Con)	Dan Price (Lab)	Details
Cleveland Police	Steve Turner (Con)	Matt Storey (Labour Co-op)	Details
Cumbria Constabulary	Peter McCall (Con)	David Allen (Labour Co-op)	Details
Derbyshire Constabulary	Angelique Foster (Con)	Nicolle Ndiweni (Labour Co-op)	Details
Devon and Cornwall Police	Alison Hernandez (Con)	Alison Hernandez (Con)	Details
Dorset Police	David Sidwick (Con)	David Sidwick (Con)	Details
Durham Constabulary	Joy Allen (Labour Co-op)	Joy Allen (Labour Co-op)	Details
Essex Police	Roger Hirst (Con)	Roger Hirst (Con)	Details
Gloucestershire Constabulary	Chris Nelson (Con)	Chris Nelson (Con)	Details
Hampshire and Isle of Wight Constabulary	Donna Jones (Con)	Donna Jones (Con)	Details
Hertfordshire Constabulary	David Lloyd (Con)	Jonathan Ash-Edwards (Con)	Details
Humberside Police	Jonathan Evison (Con)	Jonathan Evison (Con)	Details
Kent Police	Matthew Scott (Con)	Matthew Scott (Con)	Details
Lancashire Constabulary	Andrew Snowden (Con)	Clive Grunshaw (Labour Co-op)	Details
Leicestershire Police	Rupert Matthews (Con)	Rupert Matthews (Con)	Details
Lincolnshire Police	Marc Jones (Con)	Marc Jones (Con)	Details
Merseyside Police	Emily Spurrell (Labour Co-op)	Emily Spurrell (Labour Co-op)	Details
Norfolk Constabulary	Giles Orpen-Smellie (Con)	Sarah Taylor (Labour Co-op)	Details
Northamptonshire Police	Stephen Mold (Con)	Danielle Stone (Labour Co-op)	Details
Northumbria Police	Kim McGuinness (Labour Co-op)	Susan Dungworth (Labour Co-op)	Details
Nottinghamshire Police	Caroline Henry (Con)	Gary Godden (Labour Co-op)	Details
Staffordshire Police	Ben Adams (Con)	Ben Adams (Con)	Details
Suffolk Constabulary	Tim Passmore (Con)	Tim Passmore (Con)	Details
Surrey Police	Lisa Townsend (Con)	Lisa Townsend (Con)	Details
Sussex Police	Katy Bourne (Con)	Katy Bourne (Con)	Details
Thames Valley Police	Matthew Barber (Con)	Matthew Barber (Con)	Details
Warwickshire Police	Philip Seccombe (Con)	Philip Seccombe (Con)	Details
West Mercia Police	John Campion (Con)	John Campion (Con)	Details
West Midlands Police	Simon Foster (Lab)	Simon Foster (Lab)	Details
Wiltshire Police	Philip Wilkinson (Con)	Philip Wilkinson (Con)	Details

== Wales ==
=== Police and crime commissioner elections ===
All four police and crime commissioners in Wales were up for election, to represent the four police force areas of Dyfed-Powys, Gwent, North Wales and South Wales. All positions were held by the incumbent parties.

Constabulary	Previous PCC	Elected PCC	Details
Dyfed-Powys Police	Dafydd Llywelyn (Plaid Cymru)	Dafydd Llywelyn (Plaid Cymru) hold	Details
Gwent Police	Jeffrey Cuthbert (Labour Co-op)	Jane Mudd (Labour Co-op) hold	Details
North Wales Police	Andy Dunbobbin (Labour Co-op)	Andy Dunbobbin (Labour Co-op) hold	Details
South Wales Police	Alun Michael (Labour Co-op)	Emma Wools (Labour Co-op) hold	Details

== See also ==
- 2024 United Kingdom general election
