= 2024 Solihull Metropolitan Borough Council election =

Local election in England

← 2023	2 May 2024	2026 →

17 out of 51 seats to Solihull Metropolitan Borough Council 26 seats needed for a majority

	First party	Second party	Third party
Leader	Ian Courts	Max McLoughlin	Laura McCarthy
Party	Conservative	Green	Liberal Democrats
Seats before	29	12	6
Seats won	11	3	2
Seats after	30	10	8
Seat change	▲1	▼2	▲2
Popular vote	28,241	9,014	8,949
Percentage	50.5%	16.1%	14.2%
Swing	▲12.1%	▼13.7%	▼1.9%
	Fourth party	Fifth party
Party	Independent	Labour
Seats before	4	0
Seats won	0	1
Seats after	2	1
Seat change	▼2	▲1
Popular vote	161	10,477
Percentage	0.3%	18.7%
Swing	▼0.3%	▲3.8%
- Winner of each seat at the 2024 Solihull Metropolitan Borough Council
Leader before election
Ian Courts
Conservative
Leader after election
Ian Courts
Conservative

The 2024 Solihull Metropolitan Borough Council election took place on 2 May 2024 to elect members of Solihull Metropolitan Borough Council in the West Midlands alongside other local elections on the same day. 17 of the 51 seats were up for election.

== Background ==
Since its creation in 1974, Solihull Metropolitan Borough Council has always had the Conservatives as the largest party, with some periods of no overall control. Labour came the closest to overtaking them in 1996, when they won 16 seats to the Conservatives' 17. In the 2023 election, the Conservatives gained two seats on a vote share of 38.4% (-7.5), the Green Party lost 1 seat with 29.8% of the vote (+4.2), the Liberal Democrats gained 1 seat on 16.1% (+2.6), and Labour lost their sole remaining seat on 14.9% (+2.9).

The seats up for election in 2024 were last elected in 2021 (the election was delayed by 1 year due to COVID-19, meaning these councillors served a 3-year term). In that election, the Conservatives gained 3 seats with 53.8% of the vote, the Green Party gained 1 with 20.5%, the Liberal Democrats lost 3 with 12.2%, and Labour lost 1 with 12.9%.

== Previous council composition ==
After 2023 election		Before 2024 election		After 2024 election	
Party	Seats	Party	Seats	Party	Seats
Conservative	29	Conservative	29	Conservative	30
Green	13	Green	12	Green	10
Liberal Democrats	6	Liberal Democrats	6	Liberal Democrats	8
Independent	2	Independent	4	Independent	2
Labour	0	Labour	0	Labour	1

Changes 2023–2024:

- Stephen Rymer leaves Green Party to sit as an independent

== Councillors standing down ==
Councillor	Ward	First elected	Party	Date announced
Jim Ryan	Bickenhill Ward	1984	Conservative	26 March 2024

== Summary ==
The council remained under Conservative majority control.

=== Election result ===
2024 Solihull Metropolitan Borough Council election
Party	This election			Full council			This election		
Party	Seats	Net	Seats %	Other	Total	Total %	Votes	Votes %	+/−
Conservative	11	▲1	64.7	19	30	58.8	28,241	50.5	+12.1
Green	3	▼2	17.6	7	10	19.6	9,014	16.1	–13.7
Liberal Democrats	2	▲2	11.8	6	8	15.7	7,949	14.2	–1.9
Independent	0	▼2	0.0	2	2	3.9	161	0.3	–0.3
Labour	1	▲1	5.9	0	1	2.0	10,477	18.7	+3.8
TUSC	0	Steady	0.0	0	0	0.0	46	0.1	±0.0

== Results by ward ==
=== Bickenhill ===
Bickenhill
Party	Candidate	Votes	%	±%
Conservative	Alison Rolf	1,720	60.9	▼6.4
Labour	Margaret Turner	654	23.2	▲6.6
Green	Mark Pearson	301	10.7	▼0.5
Liberal Democrats	Adam Pilarski	149	5.3	▲0.3
Majority		1,066	37.7	▼13.0
Turnout		2,824		
Conservative hold		Swing	▼6.5	

=== Blythe ===
Blythe
Party	Candidate	Votes	%	±%
Conservative	Keith Green	2,459	60.2	▼7.2
Labour	Noel Grace	915	22.4	▲9.3
Green	Carol Linfield	409	10.0	▼4.3
Liberal Democrats	John Wyatt	302	7.4	N/A
Majority		1,544	37.8	▼15.5
Turnout		4,085		
Conservative hold		Swing	▼8.3	

=== Castle Bromwich ===
Castle Bromwich
Party	Candidate	Votes	%	±%
Conservative	Martin McCarthy	1,742	60.6	▲10.0
Labour	Emma Chidler	658	22.9	▲8.8
Green	Akin Kog	372	12.9	▼22.4
Liberal Democrats	Richard Evans	102	3.5	N/A
Majority		1,084	37.7	▲22.4
Turnout		2,874		
Conservative hold		Swing	▲0.6	

=== Chelmsley Wood ===
Chelmsley Wood
Party	Candidate	Votes	%	±%
Green	Shesh Sheshabhatter	901	58.2	▼2.0
Labour	Kenneth Harrop	348	22.5	▲4.8
Conservative	Georgina Hartland	253	16.3	▼4.2
Liberal Democrats	Matt Purssell	47	3.0	N/A
Majority		553	35.7	▼4.0
Turnout		1,549		
Green hold		Swing	▼3.4	

=== Dorridge and Hockley Heath ===
Dorridge and Hockley Heath
Party	Candidate	Votes	%	±%
Conservative	Sally Tomlinson	2,518	63.8	▼5.8
Green	Jane Holt	619	15.7	▲6.0
Labour	David Brittin	596	15.1	▲4.0
Liberal Democrats	David Godfrey	214	5.4	▼1.6
Majority		1,899	48.1	▼10.3
Turnout		3,947		
Conservative hold		Swing	▼5.9	

=== Elmdon ===
Elmdon
Party	Candidate	Votes	%	±%
Liberal Democrats	Kate Jones	1,231	39.4	▼3.9
Conservative	Yvonne Clements	1,176	37.6	▼6.0
Labour	Lisa Holcroft	473	15.1	▲2.1
Green	Margaret Ryan	140	4.5	N/A
Independent	Paul Edwards	107	3.4	N/A
Majority		55	1.8	N/A
Turnout		3,127		
Liberal Democrats gain from Conservative		Swing	▲1.1	

=== Kingshurst and Fordbridge ===
Kingshurst and Fordbridge
Party	Candidate	Votes	%	±%
Labour	Hazel Dawkins	667	40.6	▲18.0
Conservative	Brent Robertson	652	39.7	▲4.6
Green	Stephen Caudwell	271	16.5	▼25.8
Liberal Democrats	Martin Phipps	51	3.1	N/A
Majority		15	0.9	N/A
Turnout		1,641		
Labour gain from Green		Swing	▲21.9	

=== Knowle ===
Knowle
Party	Candidate	Votes	%	±%
Conservative	David Pinwell	2,483	67.2	▼6.3
Labour	Simon Johnson	579	15.7	▲4.8
Green	Mark Amphlett	374	10.1	▲2.4
Liberal Democrats	Lionel King	259	7.0	▲0.1
Majority		1,904	51.5	▼11.1
Turnout		3,695		
Conservative hold		Swing	▼5.6	

=== Lyndon ===
Lyndon
Party	Candidate	Votes	%	±%
Conservative	Josh O'Nyons	1,342	39.8	▼4.4
Liberal Democrats	Paul McCabe	1,201	36.1	▼4.7
Labour	Sheila Brookes	565	17.0	▲1.9
Green	Roger Halford	189	5.7	N/A
TUSC	Lynsey Fraser-Smith	46	1.4	N/A
Majority		141	3.7	▲0.3
Turnout		3,324		
Conservative hold		Swing	▲0.2	

=== Meriden ===
Meriden
Party	Candidate	Votes	%	±%
Conservative	Tony Dicicco	2,301	61.6	▼4.2
Labour	Cathy Connan	690	18.5	▲7.7
Green	Antony Lowe	384	10.3	▼13.0
Liberal Democrats	Peter Lee	362	9.7	N/A
Majority		1,611	43.1	▲9.5
Turnout		3,737		
Conservative hold		Swing	▼6.0	

=== Olton ===
Olton
Party	Candidate	Votes	%	±%
Liberal Democrats	Sarah Phipps	1,858	44.2	▲4.1
Conservative	James Johnson	1641	39.1	▼8.8
Labour	Jack Simpson	461	11.0	▼1.1
Green	Stephen Holt	242	5.8	N/A
Majority		217	5.2	N/A
Turnout		4,202		
Liberal Democrats gain from Conservative		Swing	▲6.5	

=== Shirley East ===
Shirley East
Party	Candidate	Votes	%	±%
Conservative	Karen Grinsell	2,027	56.3	▲9.1
Labour	Gerard Dufficy	947	26.3	▲18.0
Green	Alan Wigley	390	10.8	▼13.7
Liberal Democrats	Jamshid Moori	234	6.5	N/A
Majority		1,080	30.0	▲27.2
Turnout		3,598		
Conservative hold		Swing	▼4.5	

=== Shirley South ===
Shirley South
Party	Candidate	Votes	%	±%
Green	Max McLoughlin	1,914	50.3	▼0.8
Conservative	Jessica Thompson	1,277	33.5	▼5.8
Labour	Shirley Young	485	12.7	▲4.8
Liberal Democrats	Frank Dawson	131	3.4	N/A
Majority		637	16.7	▲4.3
Turnout		3,807		
Green hold		Swing	▲2.5	

=== Shirley West ===
Shirley West
Party	Candidate	Votes	%	±%
Conservative	Prish Sharma	1,449	41.9	▲7.0
Green	Shelley Haughney	1,069	30.9	▼20.2
Labour	Kevin Raven	615	17.8	▲3.8
Liberal Democrats	Gayle Monk	166	4.8	N/A
Independent	Mark Windridge	161	4.7	N/A
Majority		380	11.0	N/A
Turnout		3,460		
Conservative gain from Green		Swing	▲13.6	

=== Silhill ===
Silhill
Party	Candidate	Votes	%	±%
Conservative	Peter Hogarth	2,183	55.7	▼11.5
Labour	Nick Stephens	779	19.9	▲1.3
Liberal Democrats	Terry Whitehead	575	14.7	▲0.5
Green	Trevor Barker	384	9.8	N/A
Majority		1,404	35.8	▼12.8
Turnout		3,921		
Conservative hold		Swing	▼6.4	

=== Smith's Wood ===
Smith's Wood
Party	Candidate	Votes	%	±%
Green	Jean Hamilton	939	58.7	▼1.0
Labour	Mark Caddick	400	25.0	▲9.0
Conservative	Kamren Grant	230	14.4	▼9.9
Liberal Democrats	Christopher Johnson	28	1.8	N/A
Majority		539	33.7	▼1.7
Turnout		1,599		
Green hold		Swing	▼5.0	

=== St. Alphege ===
St. Alphege
Party	Candidate	Votes	%	±%
Conservative	Bob Grinsell	2,807	60.9	▼8.3
Liberal Democrats	Mark Geary	819	17.8	▲6.9
Labour	Ian English	645	14.0	▲3.8
Green	Joy Aldworth	336	7.3	▼2.3
Majority		1,988	43.2	▼14.1
Turnout		4,607		
Conservative hold		Swing	▼7.6	
