= Roger Stone (councillor) =

British politician

Roger Stone OBE (born 28 July 1943) is a former leader of Rotherham Metropolitan Borough Council.

== Early life ==
He was born in the Rother Valley. He attended Brampton Ellis Secondary Modern School, now Brampton Ellis Comprehensive School.

== Career ==
He was a trade unionist, being a member of the Iron and Steel Trades Confederation, of which he was President in 1990/91. He had been a trade unionist since the early 1980s.

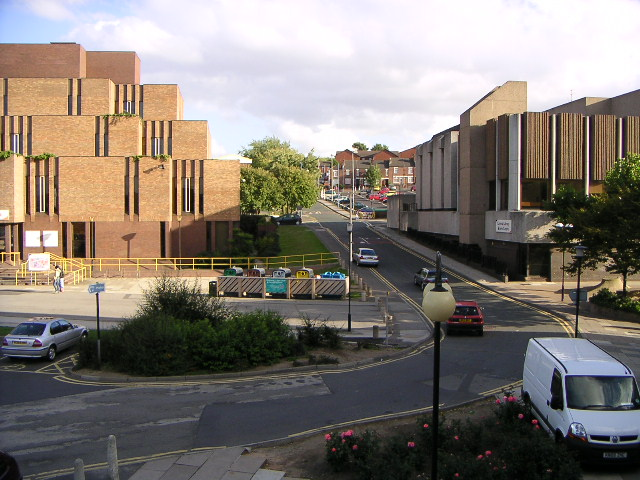
Rotherham council offices in September 2005

=== Rotherham Metropolitan Borough Council ===
He was elected to the council in May 1988. He unsuccessfully attempted to be selected as the Labour candidate for Wentworth in 1996.

He became leader of the council in 2003, resigning on Tuesday 26 August 2014 after local revelations were announced at New York Stadium, home of Rotherham United F.C. The council's chief executive at the time was Martin Kimber. He was suspended from the Labour Party on 2 September 2014 in the wake of the Rotherham child sexual exploitation scandal.

He quit as a councillor on 27 November 2014. He had represented the Silverwood ward, near the former Silverwood Colliery. His seat was to be held vacant until an election on 7 May 2015, when Labour won back the seat. All three seats in the ward were up for election again in the all out elections in Rotherham in 2016.

== Personal life ==
He lives in Kilnhurst, north-east of Rotherham, off the B609, near the railway (Dearne Valley Line). In the 2009 Birthday Honours he was made on OBE for services to local government in Rotherham.

He married Dorothy Edwards in 1962 in the Rother Valley. They had a daughter in 1965.

== See also ==
- Julie Dore, Leader since 2011 of Sheffield City Council.
- Rotherham local elections

Civic offices
Preceded by Mark Edgell	Leader of Rotherham Metropolitan Borough Council; 2003–2014	Succeeded by Paul Lakin
Trade union offices
Preceded by Terry Butterworth	President of the Iron and Steel Trades Confederation; 1990–1991	Succeeded by Charlie Hall
