= 2024 Hyndburn Borough Council election =

2024 English local election

- 2 May 2024

12 of 35 seats to Hyndburn Borough Council 18 seats needed for a majority

	First party	Second party
Leader	Munsif Dad	Marlene Howarth
Party	Labour	Conservative
Leader's seat	Spring Hill	St Oswald's
Seats before	16	16
Seats won	10	1
Seats after	22	11
Seat change	▲6	▼5
	Third party	Fourth party
Leader	Mohammed Fazal
Party	Green	Independent
Leader's seat	Central
Seats before	2	1
Seats won	1	0
Seats after	1	1
Seat change	▼1	Steady
- 2024 local election results in Hyndburn Labour Conservative Green Not contested
Leader before election
Marlene Haworth
Conservative
No overall control
Leader after election
Munsif Dad
Labour

The 2024 Hyndburn Borough Council election was held on 2 May 2024, to elect 12 of the 35 members of Hyndburn Borough Council in Lancashire, England, being the usual approximate third of the council. This was on the same day as other local elections across the country, including for the Lancashire Police and Crime Commissioner.

Prior to the election, the council was under no overall control, being led by a minority Conservative administration. The election saw Labour gain a majority of the seats on the council.

== Background ==
Before the election the Conservatives had 16 councillors, with 1 independent councillor and 2 Green councillors (the latter three all having previously been elected for Labour), and Labour had 16 councillors. Eighteen or more seats are needed for overall control of the council. The Conservatives were running the council as a minority administration with informal support from the independent and Green councillors.

The seats up for election in 2024 had last been contested in 2021. That election had originally been due in 2020 but had been delayed by a year due to the COVID-19 pandemic, reducing the subsequent term of office from four years to three. In 2021, the Conservatives and Labour had won six seats each. Two of the six Labour councillors elected in 2021 (Caroline Montague of Barnfield ward and Paddy Short of Peel ward) had left the party in May 2022. They both subsequently joined the Green Party.

As a result of the Elections Act 2022 electors were required to present photographic identification to polling staff in order to cast their vote. Postal voters were not affected.

== Council composition ==
Prior to the election the composition of the council was:

- Conservative 16
- Green Party of England and Wales 2
- Independent 1
- Labour 16

The Conservatives were defending six seats, Labour were defending four seats, and two were held by Greens (formerly Labour). Neither of those Green councillors stood for re-election in 2024. In addition to candidates from these parties, there were one Reform UK, one Workers Party of Britain candidate and two independent candidates standing. There were also an additional four new Green Party candidates, standing in the Central, Church, Overton & Spring-Hill wards, alongside replacements for the two previous Green councillors for Barnfield and Peel (who both stood down), making six new Green candidates in total. The local Labour and Conservative parties both ran candidates in each of the 12 wards.

At the election, the Conservatives lost four seats to Labour, including their former leader, Peter Britcliffe. Labour regained both of the seats where its previous councillors had defected to the Greens, but lost one other existing Labour seat to a Green candidate.

== Local election result ==
After the election, the composition of the council's 35 seats was:

- Labour 22
- Conservative 11
- Green Party of England and Wales 1
- Independent 1

The Labour group leader, Munsif Dad, was formally appointed as leader of the council at the subsequent annual council meeting on 23 May 2024. The previous Conservative leader, Marlene Howarth, stood down as her party's group leader after the election, being replaced by Zak Khan.

Hyndburn local election result 2024 - electorate TBC (over just 12 wards) - with TBC% turnout
Party	Seats	Gains	Losses	Net gain/loss	Seats %	Votes %	Votes	+/−
Labour	10	7	1	+6		47.7	6,950	
Conservative	1	0	5	-5		35.2	5,125	
Green	1	1	2	-1		13.9	2,020	
Reform	0	0	0	0		1.7	244	
Workers Party GB	0	0	0	0		1.0	146	
Independent	0	0	0	0		0.6	90	
Spoilt Ballots	...	...	...	...			232	

The results for when this set of seats was last contested are at 2021 Hyndburn Borough Council election.

NB: Four (of 16) council wards were not up for re-election in 2024, being Clayton Le Moors, Huncoat, Immanuel in Oswaldtwistle and Milnshaw in Accrington. However, as the election for Lancashire Police and Crime Commissioner took place on the same day, all polling stations were open, across every ward in the borough.

Previous councillors who did not stand for re-election in May 2024 include – Dominik Allen (Conservative - Altham), Caroline Montague (Green - Barnfield), Abdul Khan (Labour - Central), Colin McKenzie (Labour - Overton), Paddy Short (Green - Peel) and Susan Hayes (Conservative - St. Oswalds). Former Conservative councillor Michael Miller stood for the Green Party in Peel ward.

== Ward results ==
The results for each ward were as follows, with an asterisk (*) indicating a sitting councillor standing for re-election.

=== Altham ===
Altham
Party	Candidate	Votes	%	±%
Labour	Vanessa Alexander	687	64.8	+20.5
Conservative	David Heap	374	35.2	−20.5
Majority		313	29.6	N/A
Rejected ballots		33	3.0	
Turnout		1,094	28.3	−1.5
Registered electors		3,866		
Labour gain from Conservative		Swing	+20.5	

=== Barnfield ===
Barnfield
Party	Candidate	Votes	%	±%
Labour	Clare McKenna	546	58.1	+5.9
Conservative	Foyzun Nur	249	26.5	−21.3
Green	Joan West	145	15.4	N/A
Majority		297	31.6	+27.3
Rejected ballots		14	1.5	
Turnout		954	28.8	−6.5
Registered electors		3,318		
Labour gain from Green		Swing	+13.6	

=== Baxenden ===
Baxenden
Party	Candidate	Votes	%	±%
Labour	Edward Blake	553	51.1	+10.5
Conservative	Terence Hurn*	529	48.9	−10.5
Majority		24	2.2	N/A
Rejected ballots		14	1.3	
Turnout		1,096	35.7	−5.1
Registered electors		3,070		
Labour gain from Conservative		Swing	+10.5	

The Baxenden Labour representative, known as Eddie, who was elected in May's local polls, died suddenly on November 6 - a By-election has been called for Thursday February 6, 2025. The Baxenden ward Hyndburn Council by-election candidates were revealed later.

=== Central ===
Central
Party	Candidate	Votes	%	±%
Green	Shabir Fazal	818	41.9	N/A
Conservative	Allah Dad	516	26.4	−23.0
Labour	Ijaz Ahmed	471	24.1	−26.5
Workers Party	Mohammed Irfan	146	7.5	N/A
Majority		302	15.5	N/A
Rejected ballots		22	1.1	
Turnout		1,973	49.9	−2.5
Registered electors		3,953		
Green gain from Labour		Swing	N/A	

=== Church ===
Church
Party	Candidate	Votes	%	±%
Labour	Stewart Eaves	441	37.7	−10.1
Green	Sohail Asghar	366	31.3	N/A
Conservative	Sajid Mahmood*	363	31.0	−21.2
Majority		75	6.4	N/A
Rejected ballots		23	1.9	
Turnout		1,193	33.3	−0.2
Registered electors		3,578		
Labour gain from Conservative		Swing	N/A	

=== Netherton ===
Netherton
Party	Candidate	Votes	%	±%
Labour	Noordad Aziz*	774	67.4	+6.9
Conservative	Mohammed Riaz	374	32.6	−1.2
Majority		400	34.8	+8.2
Rejected ballots		24	2.0	
Turnout		1,173	33.5	−3.3
Registered electors		3,504		
Labour hold		Swing	+4.1	

=== Overton ===
Overton
Party	Candidate	Votes	%	±%
Labour	Clare Yates	798	58.4	+12.1
Conservative	Judith McKelvey	425	31.3	−9.8
Green	Julie Stubbins	91	6.7	N/A
No Description	Paul Knighton	52	3.8	N/A
Majority		373	27.1	+21.9
Rejected ballots		10	0.7	
Turnout		1,376	29.4	−6.5
Registered electors		4,681		
Labour hold		Swing	+10.9	

=== Peel ===
Peel
Party	Candidate	Votes	%	±%
Labour	Clare Pritchard	359	51.7	−15.5
Green	Michael Miller	159	22.9	N/A
Conservative	Jean Hurn	139	20.0	−12.8
Independent	Navid Afzal	38	5.5	N/A
Majority		200	28.8	−5.7
Rejected ballots		11	1.6	
Turnout		700	22.9	−3.0
Registered electors		3,053		
Labour gain from Green		Swing	N/A	

=== Rishton ===
Rishton
Party	Candidate	Votes	%	±%
Labour	Ethan Rawcliffe	832	59.9	+24.4
Conservative	Carole Haythornthwaite*	556	40.1	+2.4
Majority		276	19.7	N/A
Rejected ballots		32	2.2	
Turnout		1,430	29.0	−6.2
Registered electors		4,931		
Labour gain from Conservative		Swing	+11.0	

=== Spring Hill ===
Spring Hill
Party	Candidate	Votes	%	±%
Labour	Munsif Dad*	532	41.1	−18.8
Green	Wayne Fitzharris	441	34.1	N/A
Conservative	Saeed Ullah	322	24.9	−14.5
Majority		91	7.0	−13.5
Rejected ballots		18	1.4	
Turnout		1,314	35.0	−2.3
Registered electors		3,758		
Labour hold		Swing	N/A	

=== St. Andrew's ===
St. Andrew's
Party	Candidate	Votes	%	±%
Labour	Andrew Gilbert	492	51.4	+14.7
Conservative	Peter Britcliffe*	466	48.6	−6.7
Majority		26	2.7	N/A
Rejected ballots		14	1.4	
Turnout		972	29.4	−2.5
Registered electors		3,309		
Labour gain from Conservative		Swing	+10.7	

=== St. Oswald's ===
St. Oswald's
Party	Candidate	Votes	%	±%
Conservative	Tina Walker	812	53.4	+2.6
Labour	Andrew Tatchell	465	30.6	−15.7
Reform	Richard Oakley	244	16.0	N/A
Majority		347	22.7	+18.2
Rejected ballots		17	1.1	
Turnout		1,542	32.2	−6.4
Registered electors		4,786		
Conservative hold		Swing	+9.1	

== Changes 2024-2026 ==
=== By-elections ===
==== Baxenden ====
Baxenden by-election: 6 February 2025
Party	Candidate	Votes	%	±%
Conservative	David Heap	406	35.7	–13.2
Reform	Ashley Joynes	368	32.3	N/A
Labour	Richard Downie	328	28.8	–22.3
Green	Lex Kristan	36	3.2	N/A
Majority		38	3.4	N/A
Turnout		1,141	36.6	+0.9
Registered electors		3,116		
Conservative gain from Labour				
