= 2024 Rotherham Metropolitan Borough Council election =

2024 council election in Yorkshire, England

- 2 May 2024

All 59 Seats to Rotherham Metropolitan Borough Council 30 seats needed for a majority

	Majority party	Minority party
Leader	Chris Read	Simon Ball
Party	Labour	Conservative
Leader's seat	Wickersley North	Hellaby & Maltby
Last election	32 seats, 41.4%	20 seats, 28.4%
Seats before	32	15
Seats after	33	13
	Third party	Fourth party
Leader	None (Note: 6 councillors sit as Independents and 2 councillors sit as Independent Conservatives.)	Adam Carter
Party	Independent	Liberal Democrats
Last election	1 seat, 5.2%	3 seats, 7.9%
Seats before	8	4
Seats after	10	3
- Map of the results
Leader before election
Chris Read
Labour
Leader after election
Chris Read
Labour

The 2024 Rotherham Metropolitan Borough Council election was held on Thursday 2 May 2024, alongside the other local elections in the United Kingdom, which were held on the same day. It elected all 59 councillors to the Rotherham Metropolitan Borough Council for a four-year term, ending in 2028. Labour retained their majority on the council.

== Electoral process ==
The council elects its councillors every four years. The election took place by first-past-the-post voting, with wards being represented by two or three councillors.

All registered electors (British, Irish, Commonwealth and European Union citizens) living in Rotherham Borough aged 18 or over were entitled to vote in the election. People who live at two addresses in different councils, such as university students with different term-time and holiday addresses, are entitled to be registered for and vote in elections in both local authorities. Voting in-person at polling stations took place from 07:00 to 22:00 on election day, and voters were able to apply for postal votes or proxy votes in advance of the election.

== Previous council composition ==
After 2021 election		Before 2024 election		After 2024 election	
Party	Seats	Party	Seats	Party	Seats
Labour	32	Labour	32	Labour	33
Conservative	20	Conservative	15	Conservative	13
Independent	1	Independent	8	Independent	10
Liberal Democrats	3	Liberal Democrats	4	Liberal Democrats	3
Rotherham Democratic Party	3	Rotherham Democratic Party	0	Rotherham Democratic Party	0

== Ward results ==
=== Anston & Woodsetts ===
Anston & Woodsetts
Party	Candidate	Votes	%	±%
Conservative	Timothy James Baum-Dixon*	1,325	39.6	−1.2
Liberal Democrats	Drew Tarmey*	1,227	36.7	+9.2
Conservative	John Michael Blackham	1,217	36.4	−0.3
Conservative	Karen Smallwood	1,142	34.1	+6.2
Liberal Democrats	Bev Thornley	1,023	30.6	+9.1
Labour	Carol Stringer	745	22.3	−2.5
Liberal Democrats	David Edward Wilson	743	22.2	+7.9
Labour	Neelam Alam	712	21.3	+0.9
Labour	Keith Stringer	681	20.4	+7.8
Independent	Clive Robert Jepson	469	14.0	−6.2
Majority				
Rejected ballots		9		
Registered electors		9,361		
Turnout		3,346	35.84	
Conservative hold		Swing		
Liberal Democrats gain from Conservative		Swing		
Conservative hold		Swing		

=== Aston & Todwick ===
Aston & Todwick
Party	Candidate	Votes	%	±%
Conservative	Joshua Bacon*	1,234	50.0	+4.4
Labour	Sarah Ann Allen**	1,090	44.2	+6.8
Conservative	Patricia Anita Collins	990	40.1	−2.3
Labour	Geoff Frost	809	32.8	+0.4
Liberal Democrats	Mark Lambert	259	10.5	+4.7
Majority				
Rejected ballots		19		
Registered electors		7,024		
Turnout		2,466	35.38	
Conservative hold		Swing		
Labour gain from Conservative		Swing		

Sarah Ann Allen was a sitting councillor for Greasbrough.

=== Aughton & Swallownest ===
Aughton & Swallownest
Party	Candidate	Votes	%	±%
Labour	Lyndsay Pitchley*	879	45.9	+0.4
Labour	Robert Paul Taylor*	730	38.2	+10.2
Conservative	Caden James Ben Lunness	587	30.7	−6.4
Independent	Nigel Short	435	22.7	N/A
Reform	Linda Denise Elsey	285	14.9	N/A
Green	George Robinson	185	9.7	N/A
Liberal Democrats	Paul Stephen Lindley	106	5.5	−0.5
TUSC	Paul Marshall	56	2.9	N/A
Majority				
Rejected ballots		5		
Registered electors		6,556		
Turnout		1,913	29.26	
Labour hold		Swing		
Labour gain from Conservative		Swing		

=== Boston Castle ===
Boston Castle
Party	Candidate	Votes	%	±%
Independent	Taiba Yasseen*	1,389	37.3	−4.8
Independent	Ashiq Hussain	1,166	31.3	N/A
Labour	Saghir Alam*	1,126	30.2	−18.1
Labour	Jeanette Mallinder	986	26.5	−21.8
Labour	Fakhri Saleh	729	19.6	−22.5
Green	Aaliya Malik	693	18.6	N/A
Green	Tony Mabbott	656	17.6	N/A
Conservative	Tina Kumar	477	12.8	−15.5
Independent	Sam Lilleker	449	12.1	N/A
Liberal Democrats	Cheryl Lynn Jones	365	9.8	−2.7
Conservative	Piyush Satyawadi	341	9.2	N/A
Conservative	Anurag Singh	341	9.2	N/A
Independent	Phil Potholes	328	8.8	N/A
Independent	Mohammed Ramzan	328	8.8	N/A
TUSC	Chris Bingham	221	5.9	−0.7
Majority				
Rejected ballots		25		
Registered electors		10,252		
Turnout		3,723	36.56	
Independent gain from Labour		Swing		
Independent gain from Labour		Swing		
Labour hold		Swing		

=== Bramley & Ravenfield ===
Bramley & Ravenfield
Party	Candidate	Votes	%	±%
Conservative	Gregory Reynolds*	910	41.6	−8.7
Labour	Liz Duncan	875	40.0	+16.5
Conservative	Lewis Mills*	844	38.5	−1.2
Labour	John Stewart Woodland	703	32.1	+8.8
Green	Russell Fred Oxley	269	12.3	−3.4
Liberal Democrats	Frances Jane Taylor	233	10.6	+4.8
Majority				
Turnout		2,190	31.12	
Conservative hold		Swing		
Labour gain from Conservative		Swing		

=== Brinsworth ===
Brinsworth
Party	Candidate	Votes	%	±%
Liberal Democrats	Adam Jonathon Carter*	1,190	55.8	−0.1
Liberal Democrats	Charlotte Rachel Carter*	1,114	52.3	+6.3
Labour	Samuel David Jackson	667	31.3	−0.9
Labour	David John Roche**	369	17.3	−0.3
Green	James Ian Crowe	267	12.5	N/A
Conservative	Alexander Neal Hall	161	7.6	−7.0
Conservative	Graham Frederick Penn	148	6.9	N/A
Majority				
Turnout		2,131	28.72	
Liberal Democrats hold		Swing		
Liberal Democrats hold		Swing		

David John Roche was a sitting councillor for Hoober

=== Dalton & Thrybergh ===
Dalton & Thrybergh
Party	Candidate	Votes	%	±%
Independent	Michael Bennett-Sylvester*	830	50.1	−12.4
Independent	Jodie Ryalls	628	37.9	N/A
Labour	Cora Lancashire	527	31.8	+2.8
Labour	Carol Spencer	491	29.6	+5.1
Conservative	Penny Kay	116	7.0	−15.5
Conservative	Paul Stables	77	4.6	N/A
Liberal Democrats	Jane Watson	69	4.2	−2.4
Majority				
Turnout		1,657	23.97	
Independent hold		Swing		
Independent gain from Labour		Swing		

=== Dinnington ===
Dinnington
Party	Candidate	Votes	%	±%
Conservative	Julz Hall*	1,397	44.9	+3.5
Conservative	Sophie Dack*	1,252	40.2	+9.6
Labour	Amanda Marie Clarke	1,196	38.4	+9.3
Labour	Marshall Anthony Mellor	1,131	36.3	+10.4
Conservative	Benjamin John Whomersley*	1,120	36.0	+2.7
Labour	John Vjestica	1,009	32.4	+5.5
Green	Ian David Barkley	372	12.0	+0.5
Independent	Simon Andrew Tweed	306	9.8	N/A
Reform	Tony Harrison	305	9.8	N/A
Liberal Democrats	Matt Mears	190	6.1	−4.2
Majority				
Turnout		3,112	33.30	
Conservative hold		Swing		
Conservative hold		Swing		
Labour gain from Conservative		Swing		

=== Greasbrough ===
Greasbrough
Party	Candidate	Votes	%	±%
Labour	Linda Beresford	636	47.4	+11.2
Independent	Rob Elliott*	616	45.9	+10.3
Labour	Sonia Blake	508	37.9	+11.4
Conservative	Julia Helen Mitchell	138	10.3	−19.3
Conservative	Wendy Singleton	128	9.5	N/A
Liberal Democrats	Donna Moseley	85	6.3	+1.6
Majority				
Turnout		1,341	22.94	
Labour hold		Swing		
Independent gain from Rotherham Democratic Party		Swing		

=== Hellaby & Maltby West ===
Hellaby & Maltby West
Party	Candidate	Votes	%	±%
Conservative	Simon Ashley Ball*	994	47.4	−8.1
Conservative	Lynda Jayne Stables	911	43.5	+5.2
Labour	Jenny Andrews*	863	41.2	+1.3
Labour	Fiona Ozyer-Key	697	33.3	+6.6
Reform	Daviyd Franckeiss	232	11.1	N/A
Liberal Democrats	Ken Barber	113	5.4	+1.0
Majority				
Turnout		2,096	33.91	
Conservative hold		Swing		
Conservative gain from Labour		Swing		

=== Hoober ===
Hoober
Party	Candidate	Votes	%	±%
Labour	Denise Lelliott*	1,347	66.0	+20.9
Labour	John Williams	1,240	60.8	+18.8
Labour	Rajmund Edwin Brent	980	48.0	+11.7
Conservative	Charles Ball	350	17.1	−19.2
Green	Thomas Walter Hill	343	16.8	+6.2
Conservative	Val Ball	341	16.7	−15.9
Conservative	Michael Edwin Dennis	298	14.6	−15.4
Liberal Democrats	Steve Scutt	259	12.7	+7.0
Majority				
Turnout		2,041	21.49	
Labour hold		Swing		
Labour hold		Swing		
Labour gain from Conservative		Swing		

=== Keppel ===
Keppel
Party	Candidate	Votes	%	±%
Labour	Gill Garnett	1,179	42.6	+2.2
Labour	Carole Foster	1,092	39.4	+1.9
Independent	Sid Currie	1,068	38.6	N/A
Labour	Richard Hall	892	32.2	+6.9
Independent	Neil Mark Collett	634	22.9	N/A
Yorkshire	Peter Robert Key	406	14.7	−0.3
Conservative	Elizabeth Millicent Currey	378	13.7	−17.1
Conservative	Nicholas Charles Townrow	352	12.7	N/A
Green	Sylvia June Williams	352	12.7	N/A
Conservative	Kim Lesley Rodgers	331	12.0	N/A
Liberal Democrats	Khoulod Ghanem	151	5.5	−3.4
TUSC	Tom Lynn	67	2.4	N/A
Majority				
Turnout		2,769	26.50	
Labour hold		Swing		
Labour hold		Swing		
Independent gain from Rotherham Democratic Party		Swing		

=== Kilnhurst & Swinton East ===
Kilnhurst & Swinton East
Party	Candidate	Votes	%	±%
Labour	Victoria Cusworth*	1,046	67.1	+6.9
Labour	Nigel Harper*	957	61.4	+8.2
Conservative	Aaron Barker	294	18.9	−13.2
Conservative	Anthony Paul Wiseman	244	15.7	N/A
Liberal Democrats	John Richard Gelder	150	9.6	+2.8
Majority				
Turnout		1,559	24.98	
Labour hold		Swing		
Labour hold		Swing		

=== Maltby East ===
Maltby East
Party	Candidate	Votes	%	±%
Labour	Donna Sutton	796	47.6	+15.5
Conservative	Adam James Tinsley*	751	44.9	+7.0
Labour	John Andrew Webster	698	41.8	+18.8
Conservative	Lee James Hunter*	664	39.7	+2.9
Liberal Democrats	Margaret Eileen Towler	85	5.1	+2.6
Majority				
Turnout		1,671	26.06	
Labour gain from Conservative		Swing		
Conservative hold		Swing		

=== Rawmarsh East ===
Rawmarsh East
Party	Candidate	Votes	%	±%
Labour	Dave Sheppard*	825	59.7	+11.8
Labour	Rachel Hughes*	707	51.1	+10.0
Yorkshire	David Atkinson	343	24.8	N/A
Conservative	Wendy Susan Birch	186	13.4	−17.8
Conservative	Valerie Michele Wightman	126	9.1	N/A
Green	Emily Rose West	118	8.5	N/A
Liberal Democrats	Elaine Dawson	72	5.2	−2.6
Majority				
Turnout		1,383	20.45	
Labour hold		Swing		
Labour hold		Swing		

=== Rawmarsh West ===
Rawmarsh West
Party	Candidate	Votes	%	±%
Labour	Joanna Baker-Rogers	945	65.0	+19.7
Labour	Brian Steele	742	51.0	+18.4
Conservative	Natalie Thomas Stafford	323	22.2	−14.3
Conservative	Robert Race	293	20.2	N/A
TUSC	William Mark Price	184	12.7	+10.3
Liberal Democrats	Tom Sturgess	120	8.3	+0.5
Majority				
Turnout		1,454	21.89	
Labour hold		Swing		
Labour gain from Conservative		Swing		

=== Rotherham East ===
Rotherham East
Party	Candidate	Votes	%	±%
Labour	Angham Ahmed	1,072	44.1	−10.6
Labour	Haroon Rashid	1,037	42.7	−1.2
Labour	Rukhsana Bibi Haleem*	1,001	41.2	+0.2
Green	Richard Penycate	725	29.8	+11.5
Independent	Kath Reeder	507	20.9	+6.7
Conservative	Donna Marie Green	400	16.5	−9.2
Conservative	Geoffrey Mark Downs	380	15.6	N/A
Conservative	Nadia Meharban	227	9.3	N/A
Liberal Democrats	Aaban Mudassir Shah	262	10.8	−0.6
Majority				
Turnout		2,430	23.84	
Labour hold		Swing		
Labour hold		Swing		
Labour hold		Swing		

=== Rotherham West ===
Rotherham West
Party	Candidate	Votes	%	±%
Independent	Ian Paul Jones*	1,495	50.9	+11.2
Labour	Eve Rose Keenan*	939	32.0	−0.2
Labour	Cameron McKiernan	779	26.5	−9.7
Labour	Tajamal Khan**	693	23.6	−8.4
Green	Richard Mills	571	19.4	N/A
Independent	Mohammad Ashiq	562	19.1	N/A
Independent	Ishtiaq Ahmed	454	15.5	+7.6
Conservative	Barrie Marsh	268	9.1	N/A
Conservative	Pamela Ethel Freeman-Keel	248	8.4	N/A
Conservative	Ruth Pauline Marsh	234	8.0	−11.7
Liberal Democrats	Firas Miro**	227	7.7	+1.5
Majority				
Turnout		2,936	30.31	
Independent gain from Rotherham Democratic Party		Swing		
Labour hold		Swing		
Labour hold		Swing		

Tajamal Khan was a sitting councillor for Rotherham East

Firas Miro was a sitting councillor for Rother Vale

=== Rother Vale ===
Rother Vale
Party	Candidate	Votes	%	±%
Labour	Terry Adair	841	45.1	+11.3
Labour	Jamie Baggaley	840	45.1	+16.8
Liberal Democrats	Tony Hoult	617	33.1	−4.9
Liberal Democrats	Liam O'Sullivan	553	29.7	+0.9
Conservative	Julie Thorp	208	11.2	−11.3
Conservative	Suman Thullimalli	153	8.2	−12.4
TUSC	Neil Adshead	146	7.8	+3.8
Majority				
Turnout		1,864	26.52	
Labour gain from Liberal Democrats		Swing		
Labour hold		Swing		

=== Sitwell ===
Sitwell
Party	Candidate	Votes	%	±%
Conservative	David Frank Fisher*	1,357	36.1	+0.7
Conservative	Paul Stewart Thorp	1,186	31.6	−4.9
Independent	Mick Bower*	1,145	30.5	+4.3
Conservative	Paul Jonathan Freeman-Keel	1,023	27.2	+1.2
Labour	Mike Calton	1,019	27.1	+0.5
Labour	David Neil Spence	971	25.8	+1.8
Labour	Sachin Tammewar	765	20.4	−3.0
Green	Mahmood Hussain	588	15.6	+4.3
Reform	Allen Cowles	519	13.8	−4.7
Reform	John Turner	461	12.3	N/A
Liberal Democrats	Colin David Taylor	443	11.8	±0.0
Reform	Gavin Shawcroft	307	8.2	−0.8
Majority				
Turnout		3,759	38.96	
Conservative hold		Swing		
Conservative hold		Swing		
Independent gain from Labour		Swing		

Mick Bower now sits as Green Party

=== Swinton Rockingham ===
Swinton Rockingham
Party	Candidate	Votes	%	±%
Labour	Gina Monk*	1,028	67.4	+6.5
Labour	Chris Read**	1,018	66.8	+11.9
Conservative	David Leslie Harrison Le Neve	264	17.3	−15.1
Conservative	Simon Anthony Webb	234	15.3	N/A
Liberal Democrats	Linda Read	125	8.2	+1.8
Majority				
Turnout		1,525	25.19	
Labour hold		Swing		
Labour hold		Swing		

Chris Read was a sitting councillor for Wickersley North

=== Thurcroft & Wickersley South ===
Thurcroft & Wickersley South
Party	Candidate	Votes	%	±%
Conservative	Thomas Ryan Collingham*	1,300	58.6	+12.7
Conservative	Zachary Aron Collingham*	1,163	52.4	+6.9
Labour	Jean Marion Akid	742	33.5	+7.6
Labour	Abdul Rashid	414	18.7	−3.3
Liberal Democrats	Pat Tarmey	223	10.1	+4.8
Majority				
Turnout		2,218	29.59	
Conservative hold		Swing		
Conservative hold		Swing		

=== Wales ===
Wales
Party	Candidate	Votes	%	±%
Independent	Dominic Edward Beck*	1,184	49.8	+0.9
Independent	Marnie Anne Havard*	873	36.7	+2.4
Conservative	Cheryl Terese Barton	671	28.2	−4.4
Conservative	Jodie Leigh Nicholson	547	23.0	−9.3
Labour	Janet Law	533	22.4	−26.5
Labour	Bob Walsh	397	16.7	−17.6
Green	Paul Neville Martin	177	7.4	−10.3
Liberal Democrats	Oliver Boddye	84	3.5	+0.2
Majority				
Turnout		2,376	33.60	
Independent gain from Labour		Swing		
Independent gain from Labour		Swing		

=== Wath ===
Wath
Party	Candidate	Votes	%	±%
Labour	Sheila Cowen*	928	58.1	+10.8
Labour	Dave Jackson	814	51.0	−0.9
SDP	Michael Chambers	345	21.6	+6.2
Liberal Democrats	Ingrid Mary Frances House	218	13.7	+3.3
Conservative	Louise Fiona Burnett	201	12.6	−16.3
Conservative	Simon Lee Burnett	189	11.8	N/A
Majority				
Turnout		1,596	24.11	
Labour hold		Swing		
Labour hold		Swing		

=== Wickersley North ===
Wickersley North
Party	Candidate	Votes	%	±%
Labour	James Jonathon Mault	1,273	51.9	+8.6
Labour	Lynda Marshall	1,177	48.0	+8.5
Labour	Stuart Knight	1,116	45.5	+7.2
Conservative	Andrew Matthew Gorman	493	20.1	−10.7
Green	Shelagh Mary Garside	485	19.8	N/A
Conservative	Kenneth Rooney Marshall	478	19.5	+3.3
Independent	Alan Derek Napper	472	19.2	N/A
Conservative	Marilyn Marshall	470	19.2	N/A
Liberal Democrats	Julie Elizabeth Read	244	9.9	+1.6
Majority				
Turnout		2,454	26.85	
Labour hold		Swing		
Labour hold		Swing		
Labour hold		Swing		

== By-election ==
=== Keppel ===
Keppel by-election: 10 July 2025
Party	Candidate	Votes	%	±%
Reform	Tony Harrison	1,160	40.3	N/A
Independent	Neil Collett	801	27.8	–1.9
Labour	Kieran Bold	558	19.4	–13.3
Conservative	Lewis Mills	105	3.6	–6.9
Yorkshire	Peter Key	100	3.5	–7.8
Liberal Democrats	Khoulod Ghanem	80	2.8	–1.4
Green	Tony Mabbott	77	2.7	–7.1
Majority		359	12.5	N/A
Turnout		2,885	27.3	+0.8
Registered electors		10,557		
Reform gain from Labour				

=== Anston & Woodsetts ===
Anston & Woodsetts by-election: 19 November 2026
Party	Candidate	Votes	%	±%
Conservative	Mike Hemingway	825	26.2	−9.0
Reform	Andy Damms	780	24.8	N/A
Liberal Democrats	Bev Thornley	660	21.0	−11.6
Labour	Ashley Gregory	578	18.0	−1.4
Restore	Paul Vernon	239	7.6	N/A
Green	Annie Blench	64	2.0	N/A
Majority		45	1.4	N/A
Turnout		3146	34.0	−1.9
Conservative hold		Swing		
