= 2024 Broxbourne Borough Council election =

Local election in Hertfordshire, England

- 2 May 2024

10 out of 30 seats to Broxbourne Borough Council 16 seats needed for a majority
- Turnout: 18,633, 25.93%
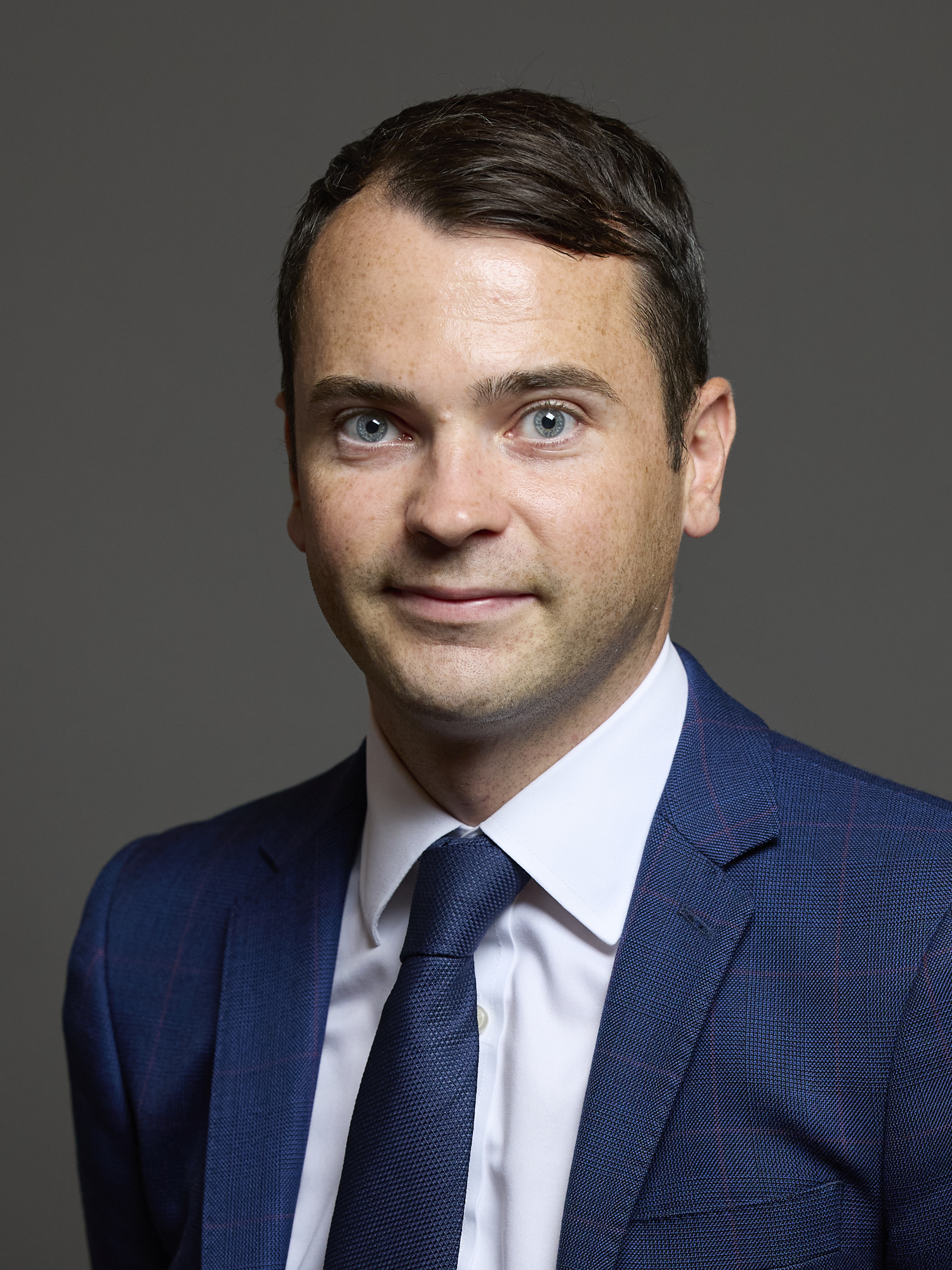

	First party	Second party
Leader	Lewis Cocking	Carol Bowman
Party	Conservative	Labour
Last election	27 seats, 50.3%	3 seats, 29.3%
Seats before	27	3
Seats after	27	3
Seat change	Steady	Steady
Popular vote	9,404	5,687
Percentage	50.4%	30.5%
Swing	▲0.1%	▲1.0%
- Winner of each seat at the 2024 Broxbourne Borough Council election
Leader before election
Lewis Cocking
Conservative
Leader after election
Mark Mills-Bishop
Conservative

The 2024 Broxbourne Borough Council election took place on 2 May 2024 to elect members of Broxbourne Borough Council in Hertfordshire, England. This was on the same day as other local elections across England and Hertfordshire's Police and Crime Commissioner election. The council remained under Conservative majority control.

== Background ==
As is typical for Broxbourne's local elections, ten seats of the thirty total were contested. The Conservative Party have controlled the council since the council's creation in 1974. Prior to the election they had control of twenty-seven of the thirty seats, meaning it was impossible for them to lose majority control regardless of the election's results. The leader of the council prior to the election, Lewis Cocking, did not stand for re-election.

All seats being contested were held by the Conservative Party, with the exception of Waltham Cross's seat (held by Labour). Labour, the Green Party and the Conservatives put forth candidates for all seats up for election. The Liberal Democrats also contested every seat except Cheshunt South and Theobalds Ward. Additionally, in some seats candidates representing the Trade Unionist and Socialist Coalition and the UK Independence Party also stood alongside one independent candidate.

== Election results ==
The results of the election were announced one day after voting. In a repeat of the previous year, Labour held the contested Waltham Cross ward while the Conservatives held in every other ward. Therefore, with no seats changing hands, the Conservatives maintained their majority control of the council. The Conservatives chose Mark Mills-Bishop to be their new leader and he was formally appointed as leader of the council at the subsequent annual council meeting on 14 May 2024.

2024 Broxbourne Borough Council election
Party	This election			Full council			This election		
Party	Seats	Net	Seats %	Other	Total	Total %	Votes	Votes %	+/−
Conservative	9	Steady	90.0	18	27	90.0	9,404	50.4	+0.1
Labour	1	Steady	10.0	2	3	10.0	5,687	30.5	+1.0
Green	0	Steady	0.0	0	0	0.0	1,830	9.8	-0.6
Liberal Democrats	0	Steady	0.0	0	0	0.0	1,148	6.2	-2.0
TUSC	0	Steady	0.0	0	0	0.0	219	1.2	+0.9
UKIP	0	Steady	0.0	0	0	0.0	219	1.2	N/A
Independent	0	Steady	0.0	0	0	0.0	126	0.7	-0.5

== Ward results ==
The Statements of Persons Nominated, which details the candidates standing in each ward, were released by Broxbourne Council on 8 April 2024 following the close of nominations. Sitting councillors standing for re-election are marked with an asterisk (*).

=== Broxbourne and Hoddesdon South Ward ===
Broxbourne and Hoddesdon South
Party	Candidate	Votes	%	±%
Conservative	Diane Sanders	1,313	55.3	▲1.0
Green	Sally Kemp	584	24.6	▼4.0
Labour Co-op	Roy Wareham	273	11.5	▲0.6
Liberal Democrats	Kiran Thomas	122	5.1	▼1.1
UKIP	Matthew Neale	82	3.5	New
Majority		729	30.7	▲5.0
Turnout		2374	24.72	
Conservative hold		Swing		

=== Cheshunt North Ward ===
Cheshunt North
Party	Candidate	Votes	%	±%
Conservative	Julie Gunnell	895	48.3	▲2.4
Labour	Lisa Newby	732	39.5	▲2.0
Liberal Democrats	Kostas Inchenko	102	5.5	▼4.5
Green	Madela Baddock	87	4.7	▼1.9
TUSC	Josh Asker	38	2.0	New
Majority		163	8.8	
Turnout		1854	28.14	
Conservative hold		Swing		

=== Cheshunt South and Theobalds Ward ===
Cheshunt South and Theobalds
Party	Candidate	Votes	%	±%
Conservative	Carol Crump*	821	43.8	▼1.7
Labour	Zahra Spencer	767	40.9	▲4.0
Green	Ellie Austen	131	7.0	▲1.5
Independent	Cody McCormick	126	6.7	▼5.4
TUSC	Bea Gardner	29	1.5	New
Majority		54	2.9	
Turnout		1874	27.44	
Conservative hold		Swing		

=== Flamstead End Ward ===
Flamstead End
Party	Candidate	Votes	%	±%
Conservative	Dee Hart*	934	60.0	▼0.3
Labour	Ian Dust	397	25.5	▲0.1
Green	Karen Brett	120	7.7	▲1.3
Liberal Democrats	Kypros Savopoulos	77	4.9	▼2.1
TUSC	Aaron Smith	28	1.8	▲1.0
Majority		537	34.5	
Turnout		1556	24.02	
Conservative hold		Swing		

=== Goffs Oak Ward ===
Goffs Oak
Party	Candidate	Votes	%	±%
Conservative	Pierce Connolly*	1,168	57.7	▲6.5
Liberal Democrats	David Payne	371	18.3	▲13.7
Labour	Aeden Rooney	347	17.1	▲5.8
Green	Trevor Griffiths	138	6.8	▲1.3
Majority		797	39.4	
Turnout		2024	27.26	
Conservative hold		Swing		

=== Hoddesdon North Ward ===
Hoddesdon North
Party	Candidate	Votes	%	±%
Conservative	Keith Brown*	1,033	55.8	▼6.0
Labour Co-op	Janet Wareham	433	23.4	▲0.9
Green	James McQuillan	151	8.2	▲0.2
UKIP	Albert Nicolas	137	7.4	New
Liberal Democrats	Peter Kemp	98	5.3	▼2.4
Majority		600	32.4	
Turnout		1852	24.72	
Conservative hold		Swing		

=== Hoddesdon Town and Rye Park Ward ===
Hoddesdon Town and Rye Park
Party	Candidate	Votes	%	±%
Conservative	Ken Ayling*	713	48.6	▼2.3
Labour	Andreas Georgiou	435	29.7	▼0.8
Green	Roy Clements	180	12.3	▲1.5
Liberal Democrats	Timothy Vizer	96	6.5	▼1.3
TUSC	Pauline Lesley	42	2.9	New
Majority		278	19.0	
Turnout		1466	20.68	
Conservative hold		Swing		

=== Rosedale and Bury Green Ward ===
Rosedale and Bury Green
Party	Candidate	Votes	%	±%
Conservative	Peter Chorley*	943	54.2	▲5.5
Labour	Ed Dragusin	550	31.6	▼6.4
Green	Rishi Mehta	168	9.6	▼3.8
Liberal Democrats	Kirstie de Rivaz	80	4.6	New
Majority		393	22.6	
Turnout		1741	25.53	
Conservative hold		Swing		

=== Waltham Cross Ward ===
Waltham Cross
Party	Candidate	Votes	%	±%
Labour	Sean Waters*	1,193	57.2	▲1.1
Conservative	Yinka Sonubi	570	27.4	▼2.3
Green	Robert Gledhill	134	6.4	▲1.4
Liberal Democrats	Fabio Bonfante	132	6.3	▼0.1
TUSC	Christine Thomas	55	2.6	▼0.1
Majority		623	29.9	
Turnout		2084	26.38	
Labour hold		Swing		

=== Wormley and Turnford Ward ===
Wormley and Turnford
Party	Candidate	Votes	%	±%
Conservative	Jim Clune	1,014	56.1	▲2.4
Labour	James Spencer	560	31.0	▼3.4
Green	Owen Brett	137	7.6	▼0.1
Liberal Democrats	Seema Rajani	70	3.9	▼0.3
TUSC	Robert Landon	27	1.5	New
Majority		454	25.1	
Turnout		1808	23.17	
Conservative hold		Swing		
