= Mark Edgell =

British economist

Mark Timothy Edgell (born 2 November 1961) is a British economist, and a former council leader of Rotherham Metropolitan Borough Council.

== Career ==
=== Rotherham Metropolitan Borough Council ===
He was a councillor for 13 years.

He was leader of Rotherham Council from 2000 to 2003.

== Personal life ==
He married Clare Elliott in February 1990 in Rotherham. He has a son (born in March 1992) and daughter, and has remarried.

Civic offices
Preceded by	Leader of Rotherham Metropolitan Borough Council; 2000–2003	Succeeded by Roger Stone
