= Rotherham Town Hall =

Municipal building in Rotherham, South Yorkshire, England

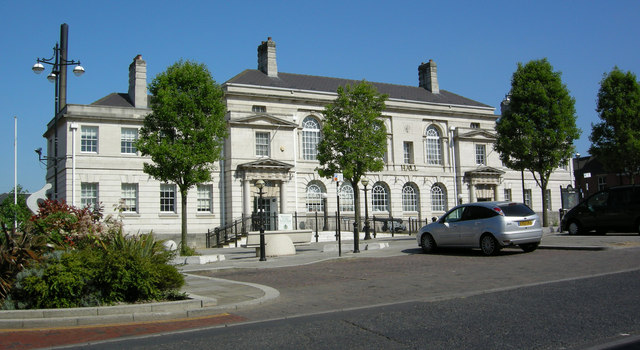
- Rotherham Town Hall with the Walker Cannon in front of the building

- Shown in South Yorkshire
- 53.4290°N 1.3554°W
- Location: The Crofts, Rotherham

History
- Built: 1929

Site notes
- Architectural style: Neoclassical style

Rotherham Town Hall is a municipal building in The Crofts, off Moorgate Street in Rotherham, South Yorkshire, England.

== History ==
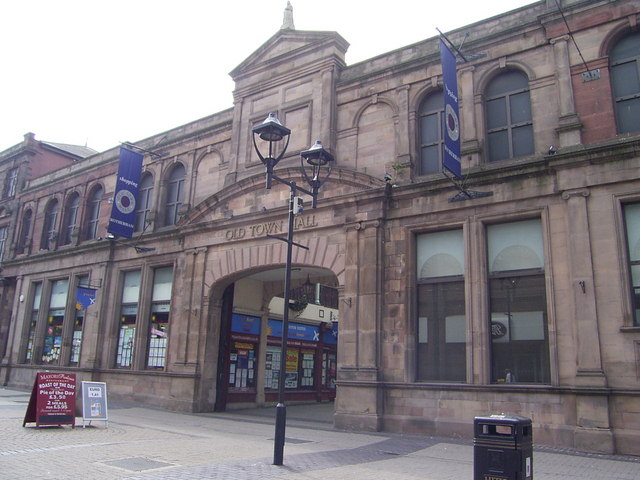
The third Town Hall

The first town hall in Rotherham, which acted as a public meeting place, a venue for the quarters sessions and also the home of the town's grammar school, was financed by the local feoffees and opened in the Market Place in 1743. This was replaced by a second town hall, which also acted as a local courthouse: it was again financed by the feoffees and opened on a site "near the old college" in 1826.

A third town hall, which once more acted as a courthouse and incorporated assembly rooms, opened in Howard Street in 1853 and was then remodelled to a design by a Mr Lovell in 1897. (Note: After the third town hall ceased its municipal functions, it was sold to a developer and was subsequently converted for use as a shopping centre.)

After deciding that the third town hall was no longer adequate for their needs, civic leaders at Rotherham Metropolitan Borough Council decided to acquire a fourth building: the building they selected was located in the Crofts which had originally formed part of the town's old cattle market in the 19th century. The building, which had been designed in the neoclassical style and built in white Portland stone, had opened as the West Riding County Courthouse in 1929.

The design for the courthouse involved a symmetrical main frontage with fifteen bays facing onto Moorgate Street; the central section of seven bays, which slightly projected forward and was taller than the rest of the building, featured five round headed windows on the ground floor flanked by two doorways each flanked by Doric order columns supporting pediments (one doorway for the nisi prius court and one for the Crown Court); there were three round headed windows on the first floor: the building had also incorporated a police station. The old courthouse was acquired by the council for the use as their meeting place in May 1985.

Following a protracted procurement process, the magistrates' new facilities at the Statutes, off Main Street, eventually became available and they were able to vacate the building in May 1994. A cannon, manufactured by Samuel Walker & Company in Masbrough and recovered from use on a naval vessel, was installed outside the building in 1995.

In the mid-1990s, civic leaders initiated a programme of works to convert the old courthouse into a town hall. Internally, the principal rooms created by these works were the council chamber, the mayor's suite and the committee rooms. A further programme of works to update and refurbish the facilities was carried out during 2010. A plaque to commemorate the nomination of Mary Maclagen as the town's first woman councillor was unveiled in the town hall in December 2018.

== See also ==
- Listed buildings in Rotherham (Boston Castle Ward)
