= 2023 Solihull Metropolitan Borough Council election =

2023 local election in England

- 4 May 2023

17 out of 51 seats to Solihull Metropolitan Borough Council 26 seats needed for a majority

	First party	Second party
Leader	Ian Courts	Max McLoughlin
Party	Conservative	Green
Last election	28 seats, 46.3%	14 seats, 16.4%
Seats before	27	14
Seats won	10	4
Seats after	29	13
Seat change	▲2	▼1
Popular vote	22,078	17,138
Percentage	38.4%	29.8%
Swing	▼7.9%	▲13.4%
	Third party	Fourth party
Leader	Laura McCarthy
Party	Liberal Democrats	Independent
Last election	5 seats, 13.5%	4 seats, 3.7%
Seats before	5	5
Seats won	3	0
Seats after	6	3
Seat change	▲1	▼2
Popular vote	9,259	367
Percentage	16.1%	0.6%
Swing	▲2.6%	▼2.5%
- Winner of each seat at the 2023 Solihull Metropolitan Borough Council election
Leader before election
Ian Courts
Conservative
Leader after election
Ian Courts
Conservative

The 2023 Solihull Metropolitan Borough Council election took place on 4 May 2023 to elect members of the Solihull Metropolitan Borough Council in West Midlands, England. This was on the same day as other local elections. There were 17 of the council's 51 seats up for election, being the usual third of the council.

The Conservatives retained their majority on the council. Solihull went against the national trend in this election; in most councils the Conservatives lost seats, whereas in Solihull they gained two extra seats.

== Overall results ==
The overall results were:

2023 Solihull Metropolitan Borough Council election
Party	This election			Full council			This election		
Party	Seats	Net	Seats %	Other	Total	Total %	Votes	Votes %	+/−
Conservative	10	▲2	58.8	19	29	56.9	22,078	45.2	▼7.5
Green	4	▼1	23.5	9	13	25.5	8,569	17.5	▲4.2
Liberal Democrats	3	▲1	17.6	3	6	11.8	9,259	18.9	▲2.6
Independent	0	▼1	0.0	2	2	3.9	367	0.8	▼2.5
Labour	0	▼1	0.0	0	0	0.0	8,553	17.5	▲2.9
TUSC	0	Steady	0.0	0	0	0.0	48	0.1	▲0.1

== Ward results ==
The results for each ward were:

=== Bickenhill ===
Bickenhill
Party	Candidate	Votes	%	±%
Conservative	Bob Sleigh*	1,479	59.3	▲0.4
Labour	Margaret Brittin	551	22.1	▲1.7
Green	Mark Pearson	299	12.0	▼2.6
Liberal Democrats	Kate Jones	165	6.6	▼0.5
Majority		928	37.2	▼2.3
Conservative hold		Swing	▼0.7	

=== Blythe ===
Blythe
Party	Candidate	Votes	%	±%
Conservative	Ken Hawkins*	1,947	55.7	▼15.1
Labour	McKenzie Uruakpa	679	19.4	▲8.6
Green	Carol Linfield	354	10.1	▼8.3
Liberal Democrats	John Wyatt	314	9.0	▲9.0
Independent	Peter Bulcock	200	5.7	▲5.7
Majority		1,268	36.3	▼16.1
Conservative hold		Swing	▼11.9	

=== Castle Bromwich ===
Castle Bromwich
Party	Candidate	Votes	%	±%
Conservative	Leslie Kaye	1,400	59.0	▲29.0
Labour	Emma Chidler	505	21.3	▲16.8
Green	Srikanth Pathuri	467	19.7	▼45.8
Majority		895	37.7	N/A
Conservative gain from Green		Swing	▲37.4	

=== Chelmsley Wood ===
Chelmsley Wood
Party	Candidate	Votes	%	±%
Green	Jane Lamden	898	64.8	▼18.8
Labour Co-op	Hazel Dawkins	330	23.8	▲12.4
Conservative	David Bell	137	9.9	▲4.9
Liberal Democrats	Jamshid Moori	21	1.5	▲1.5
Majority		568	41.0	▼31.2
Green hold		Swing	▼15.6	

=== Dorridge & Hockley Heath ===
Dorridge & Hockley Heath
Party	Candidate	Votes	%	±%
Conservative	Andy Mackiewicz*	1,956	58.0	▼5.6
Green	Jane Holt	563	16.7	0.0
Labour	Laura Attwell	479	14.2	▲7.7
Liberal Democrats	David Godfrey	376	11.1	▼2.0
Majority		1,393	41.3	▼5.6
Conservative hold		Swing	▼2.8	

=== Elmdon ===
Elmdon
Party	Candidate	Votes	%	±%
Liberal Democrats	Richard Long	1,443	53.0	▲3.7
Conservative	Catherine Price	911	33.5	▼7.6
Labour	Lisa Holcroft	369	13.6	▲4.0
Majority		532	19.5	▲11.3
Liberal Democrats hold		Swing	▲5.7	

=== Kingshurst & Fordbridge ===
Kingshurst & Fordbridge
Party	Candidate	Votes	%	±%
Conservative	David Cole	584	36.6	▼0.7
Green	Paul Sultana	542	33.9	▲11.1
Labour	Jackie Moore	387	24.2	▼15.7
Independent	Jo Cole	84	5.3	▲5.3
Majority		42	2.6	N/A
Conservative gain from Labour		Swing	▲7.5	

The previous incumbent, Marcus Brain, had been elected as a Labour councillor in 2019 but defected to the Greens in 2021.

=== Knowle ===
Knowle
Party	Candidate	Votes	%	±%
Conservative	Edward Fitter	1,989	60.0	▲19.5
Labour	Simon Johnson	444	13.4	▲7.9
Green	Mark Amphlett	443	13.4	▲6.4
Liberal Democrats	Lionel King	438	13.2	▲7.4
Majority		1,545	46.6	N/A
Conservative gain from Independent		Swing	▲5.8	

=== Lyndon ===
Lyndon
Party	Candidate	Votes	%	±%
Liberal Democrats	Kathryn Thomas*	1,684	57.7	▲19.9
Conservative	Keith Green	711	24.4	▼13.1
Labour Co-op	Sheila Brookes	474	16.2	▼8.5
TUSC	Lynsey Fraser-Smith	48	1.6	▲1.6
Majority		973	33.4	▲33.1
Liberal Democrats hold		Swing	▲16.5	

=== Meriden ===
Meriden
Party	Candidate	Votes	%	±%
Conservative	Heather Delaney	1,934	56.7	▼8.0
Green	Antony Lowe	664	19.5	▲4.8
Labour	Cathy Connan	520	15.2	▲5.4
Liberal Democrats	Frank Dawson	292	8.6	▼2.2
Majority		1,270	37.2	▼12.8
Conservative hold		Swing	▼6.4	

=== Olton ===
Olton
Party	Candidate	Votes	%	±%
Liberal Democrats	James Bradley	1,771	46.6	▲7.9
Conservative	Bob Grinsell*	1,548	40.8	▼7.6
Labour	Antony Oseland	395	10.4	▼2.5
Independent	Nick Nick	83	2.2	▲2.2
Majority		223	5.9	N/A
Liberal Democrats gain from Conservative		Swing	▲7.8	

=== Shirley East ===
Shirley East
Party	Candidate	Votes	%	±%
Conservative	Mark Parker*	1,612	51.0	▼7.8
Labour	Gerard Dufficy	835	26.4	▲18.9
Liberal Democrats	Gayle Monk	470	14.9	▼2.1
Green	Atin Kog	246	7.8	▼8.9
Majority		777	24.6	▼17.2
Conservative hold		Swing	▼13.4	

=== Shirley South ===
Shirley South
Party	Candidate	Votes	%	±%
Green	Shahin Ashraf*	1,685	52.4	▼9.1
Conservative	Howard Nicholas	1,055	32.8	▲1.1
Labour	Shirley Young	478	14.9	▲8.1
Majority		630	19.6	▼10.2
Green hold		Swing	▼4.0	

=== Shirley West ===
Shirley West
Party	Candidate	Votes	%	±%
Green	Oli Farr	1,283	43.7	▼17.3
Conservative	Lachhman Bhambra	837	28.5	▲4.2
Labour	Sarah Alan	609	20.8	▲6.1
Liberal Democrats	Christopher Johnson	205	7.0	▲7.0
Majority		446	15.2	▼21.5
Green hold		Swing	▼10.8	

The previous incumbent in this Shirley West seat, Rosi Sexton, had been elected as a Green councillor in 2019, but left the party in 2022 and served the remainder of her term as an independent.

=== Silhill ===
Silhill
Party	Candidate	Votes	%	±%
Conservative	Wazma Qais*	1,660	49.0	▼4.1
Liberal Democrats	Paul McCabe	790	23.3	▲3.4
Labour Co-op	Nick Stephens	661	19.5	▲6.1
Green	Trevor Barker	277	8.2	▼5.5
Majority		870	25.7	▼7.5
Conservative hold		Swing	▼3.8	

=== Smith's Wood ===
Smith's Wood
Party	Candidate	Votes	%	±%
Green	Mark Wilson*	848	64.8	▼5.3
Labour	Lydia Turner	280	21.4	▲6.6
Conservative	Sarah Young	180	13.8	▲5.4
Majority		568	43.4	▼11.9
Green hold		Swing	▼6.0	

=== St. Alphege ===
St. Alphege
Party	Candidate	Votes	%	±%
Conservative	Sardul Marwa	2,138	53.7	▼14.0
Liberal Democrats	Mark Geary	1,290	32.4	▲17.5
Labour	Ian English	557	14.0	▲6.7
Majority		848	21.3	▼31.5
Conservative hold		Swing	▼15.8	
