= Rotherham Metropolitan Borough Council =

Local government body in England

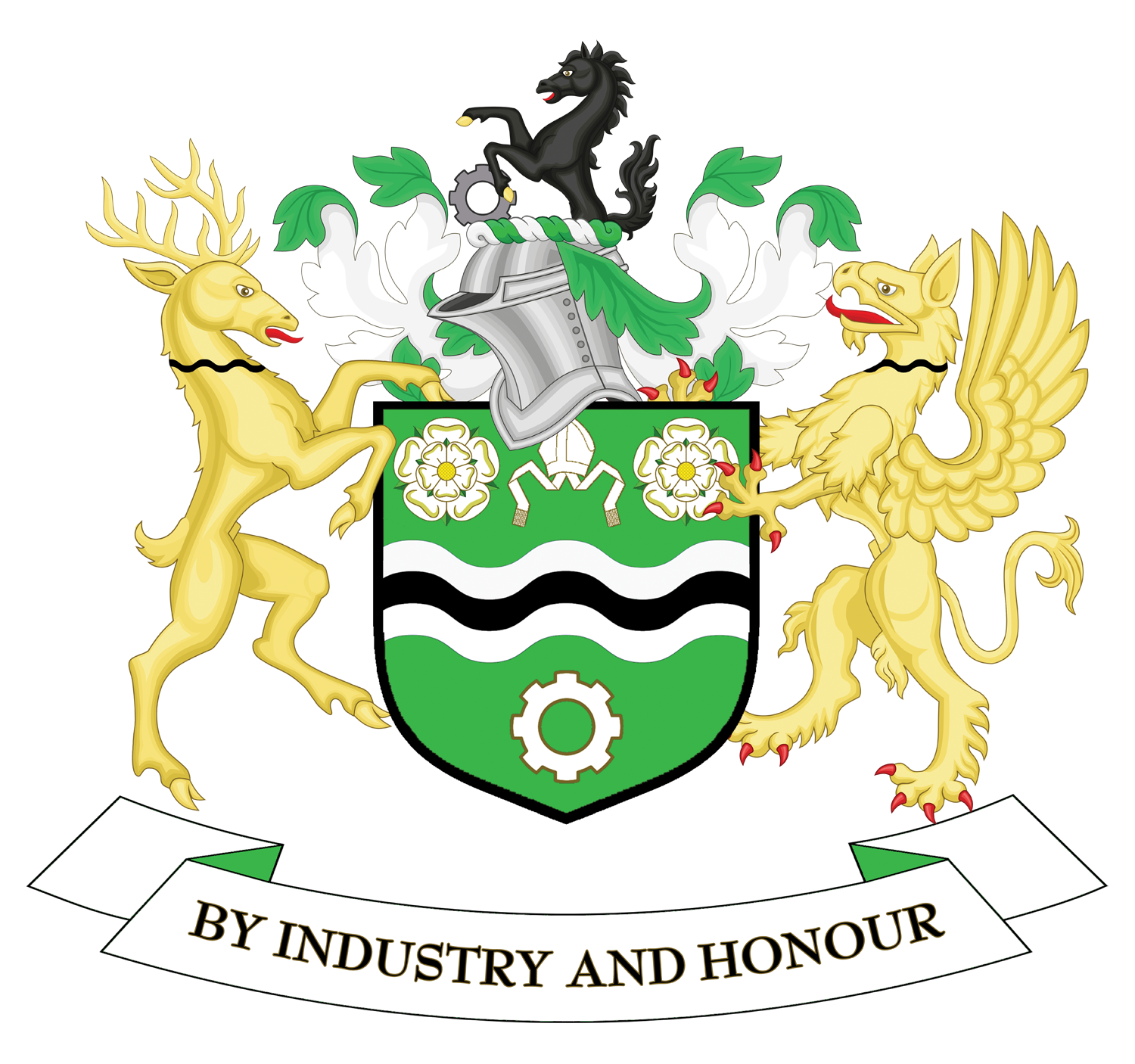
- Coat of arms

Type
- Type: Metropolitan borough council

History
- Founded: 1 April 1974

Leadership
- Mayor: Haroon Rashid, Labour since 15 May 2026
- Leader: Chris Read, Labour since 4 March 2015
- Chief Executive: John Edwards since June 2025

Structure
- Seats: 59 councillors
- Graph of the party split among 59 seats.
- Political groups: Administration (31) Labour (31) Other parties (28) Conservative (13) Liberal Democrats (3) Green (1) Reform (1) Independent (10)
- Joint committees: South Yorkshire Mayoral Combined Authority; South Yorkshire Police and Crime Panel
- Length of term: 4 years

Elections
- Voting system: First-past-the-post
- Last election: 2 May 2024
- Next election: 4 May 2028

Meeting place
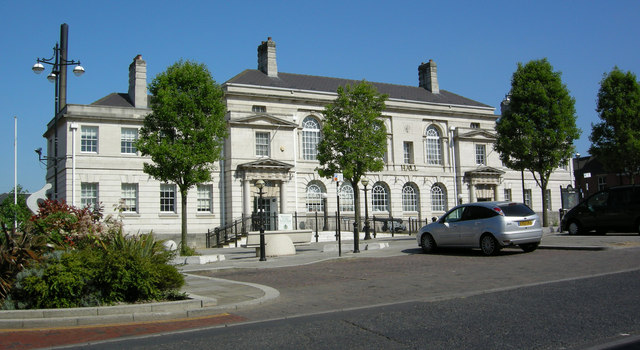
- Town Hall, The Crofts, Moorgate Street, Rotherham, S60 2TH

Website
- www.rotherham.gov.uk

Rotherham Metropolitan Borough Council is the local authority of the Metropolitan Borough of Rotherham in South Yorkshire, England. It is a metropolitan borough council and provides the majority of local government services in the borough.

The council has been under Labour majority control since the modern borough was created in 1974. Council meetings are held at Rotherham Town Hall and the council's main offices are at Riverside House.

== History ==
The town of Rotherham had been a municipal borough from 1871. In 1902 it was elevated to become a county borough, taking over county-level functions from West Riding County Council.

The county borough was abolished in 1974 and replaced by the larger Metropolitan Borough of Rotherham, which also took in the areas of the abolished urban districts of Maltby, Rawmarsh, Swinton, and Wath upon Dearne, plus the Kiveton Park Rural District and Rotherham Rural District. The enlarged district was named Rotherham after its largest town. The new district was awarded borough status from its creation, allowing the chair of the council to take the title of mayor, continuing Rotherham's series of mayors dating back to 1871.

Until 1986 the council provided district-level services, with county-level services provided by South Yorkshire County Council. Following the abolition of the county council in 1986, Rotherham also took on county-level services, with some functions provided in joint arrangements with the other South Yorkshire boroughs.

Since 2014 the council has been a constituent member of the South Yorkshire Mayoral Combined Authority (called the Sheffield City Region until 2021), which has been led by the directly elected Mayor of South Yorkshire since 2018.

In February 2015 the council had certain decision-making powers suspended and transferred to commissioners appointed by the government after the council was severely criticised by the Casey report into the Rotherham child sexual exploitation scandal. The commissioners were wound up in September 2018, when normal powers were restored to the council.

== Governance ==
The local authority derives its powers and functions from the Local Government Act 1972 and subsequent legislation. For the purposes of local government, Rotherham is within a metropolitan area of England. It provides the majority of local government services in Rotherham, including Council Tax billing, libraries, social services, processing planning applications, waste collection and disposal, and it is a local education authority. The council appoints members to South Yorkshire Fire and Rescue Authority, the South Yorkshire Police and Crime Panel and it is a constituent council of the South Yorkshire Mayoral Combined Authority. Parts of the borough are covered by civil parishes, which form a second tier of local government for their areas.

=== Political control ===
The council has been under Labour majority control since the creation of the metropolitan borough in 1974.

| Party in control | Years |
|---|---|
| Labour | 1974–present |

=== Leadership ===
The role of mayor is largely ceremonial in Rotherham. Political leadership is instead provided by the leader of the council. The leaders since 1974 have been:

| Councillor | Party | From | To |
|---|---|---|---|
| Jack Layden | Labour | 1974 | 1996 |
| Keith Billington | Labour | 1996 | 2000 |
| Mark Edgell | Labour | 2000 | 12 Sep 2003 |
| Roger Stone | Labour | 24 Sep 2003 | 26 Aug 2014 |
| Paul Lakin | Labour | 10 Sep 2014 | 4 Feb 2015 |
| Chris Read | Labour | 4 Mar 2015 | |

=== Composition ===
Following the 2024 election, and subsequent by-elections and changes of allegiance up to March 2026, the composition of the council was:

| Party | Seats |
|---|---|
| Labour | 31 |
| Conservative | 13 |
| Liberal Democrats | 3 |
| Green | 1 |
| Reform | 1 |
| Independent | 10 |
| Total | 59 |

The next election is due in May 2028.

== Elections ==
Since the last boundary changes in 2020 the council has comprised 59 councillors representing 25 wards, with each ward electing two or three councillors. Elections are held every four years.

== Premises ==
The council meets at Rotherham Town Hall on The Crofts in the centre of Rotherham, which had been built as a courthouse in 1929 and was bought by the council in 1985 to use as a town hall.

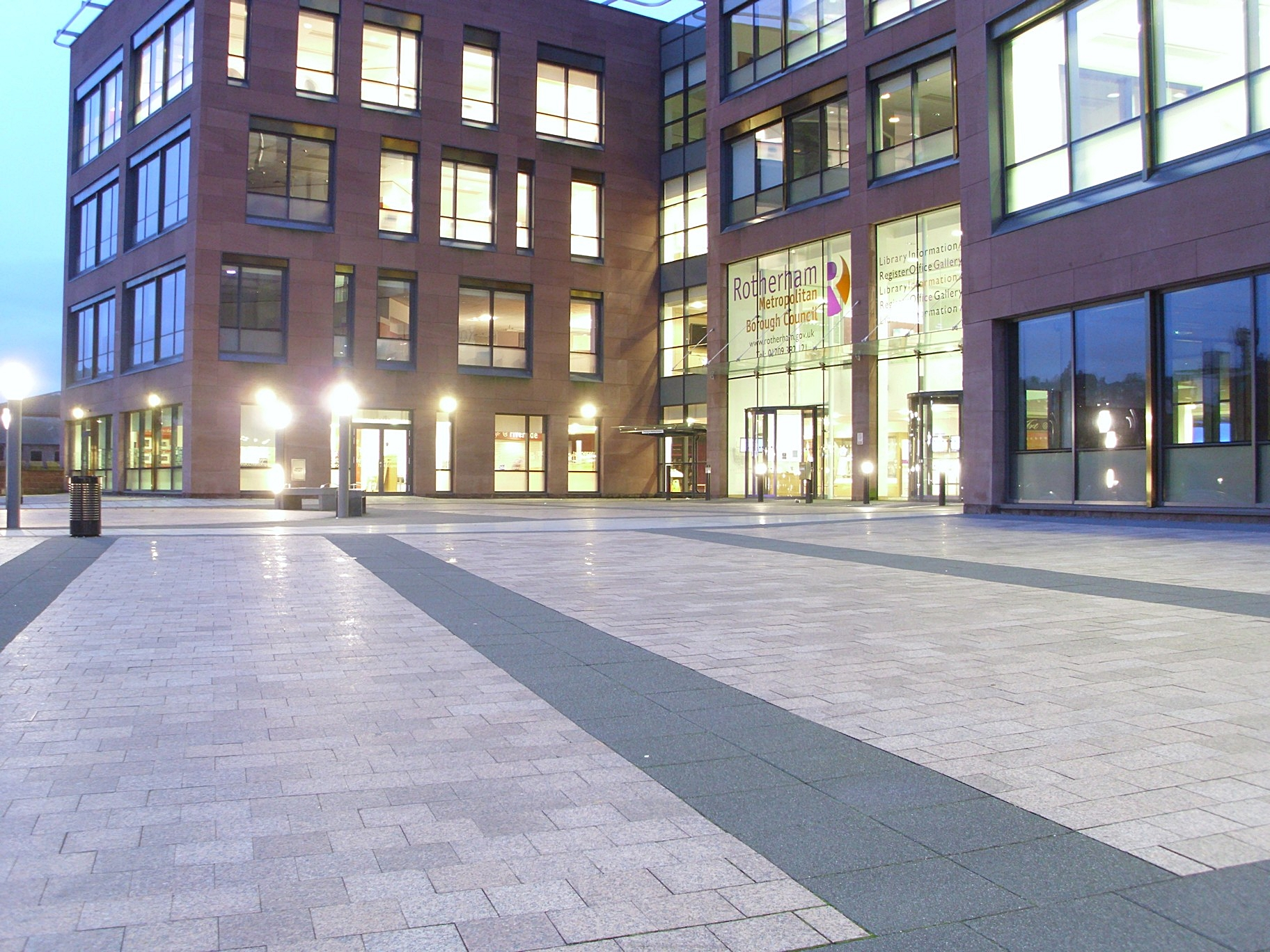
Riverside House, Main Street, Rotherham, S60 1AE: Council's main offices

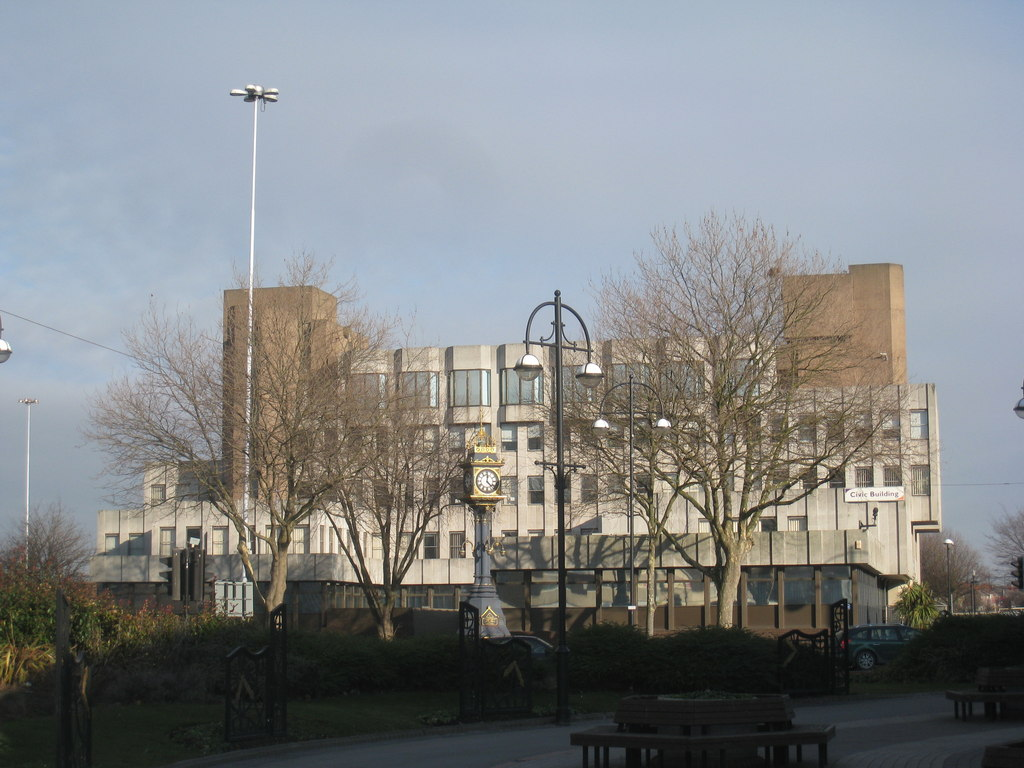
Civic Building: Council's former headquarters, since demolished.

The council has its main offices at a modern building called Riverside House on Main Street, which it moved to in 2011. Prior to moving to Riverside House the main offices were at the Civic Building on Walker Place, a 1970s building which was subsequently demolished to make way for a supermarket.

== See also ==
- South Yorkshire Police and Crime Commissioner
- Shaun Wright
