= Wath =

Wath may refer to:

== Places in England ==
- Wath (near Ripon), a village and civil parish near Ripon, North Yorkshire
- Wath, Hovingham, a village in North Yorkshire, west of Malton
- Wath-in-Nidderdale, a village near Pateley Bridge in Harrogate district, North Yorkshire
- Wath upon Dearne, a town in South Yorkshire
- Wath Rural District, a rural district in the North Riding of Yorkshire from 1894 to 1974

== Other uses ==
- Siddhesh Wath (born 1997), Indian first-class cricketer
- Baron Wath, an English title
- Wath railway station (disambiguation)
- Wath Athletic F.C., a former football club that was in Wath-upon-Dearne
- Wath Academy, Wath-upon-Dearne
- Wath Brow Hornets, an amateur rugby league football club from Cleator Moor, Cumbria
- Wath (Park Road) Secondary Modern School, Wath-upon-Dearne
- WATH, a radio station in Ohio

== See also ==
- Van der Wath, a surname
