= William Hague =

British politician and life peer (born 1961)

The Right Honourable The Lord Hague of Richmond CVO PC FRSL
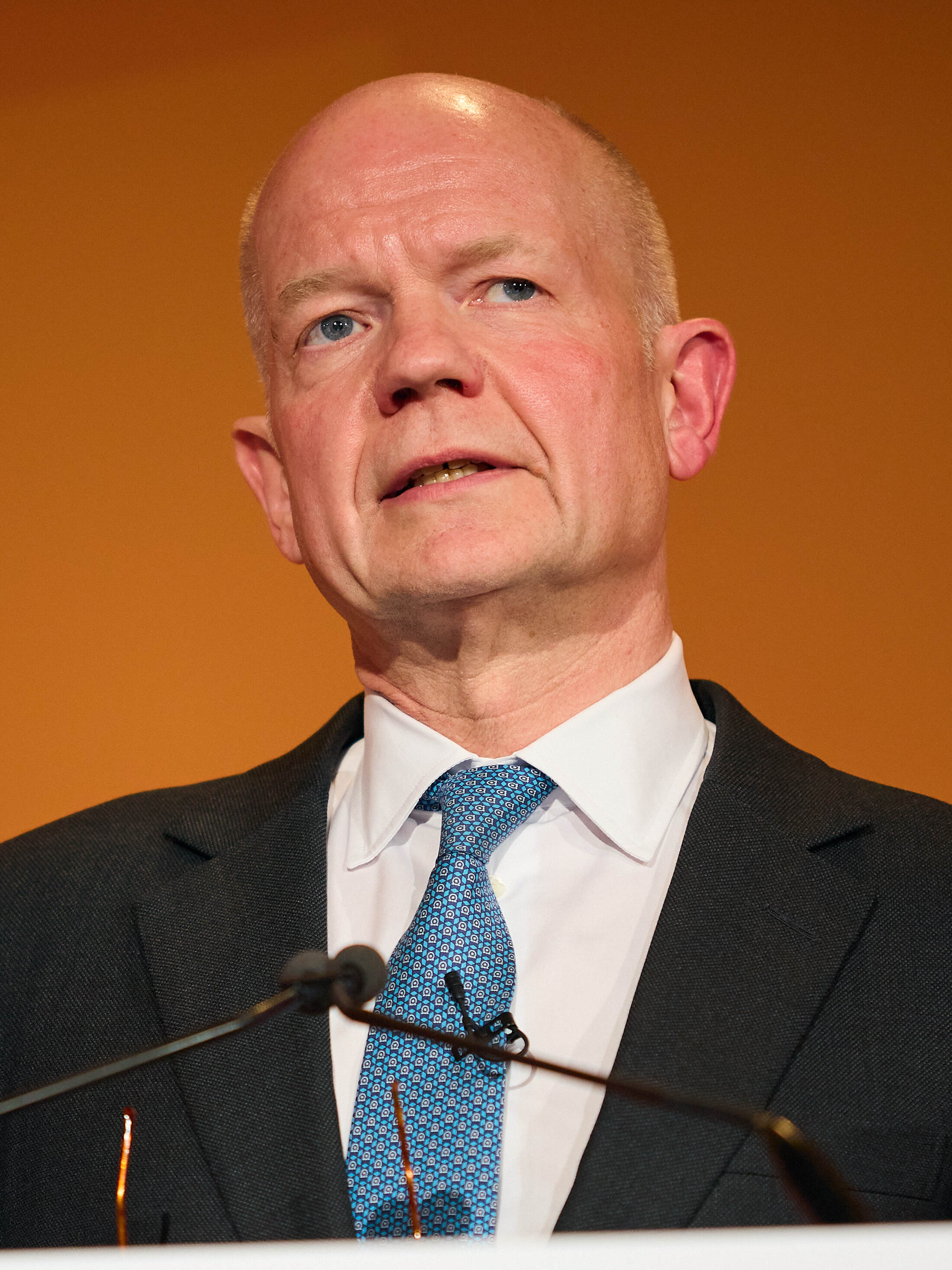
- Hague in 2022

Chancellor of the University of Oxford
- Incumbent
- Assumed office 19 February 2025
- Vice-Chancellor: Irene Tracey
- Preceded by: Chris Patten

Leader of the Opposition
- In office 19 June 1997 – 13 September 2001
- Monarch: Elizabeth II
- Prime Minister: Tony Blair
- Deputy: Peter Lilley (1998–1999)
- Preceded by: John Major
- Succeeded by: Iain Duncan Smith

Leader of the Conservative Party
- In office 19 June 1997 – 13 September 2001
- Deputy: Peter Lilley (1998–1999)
- Preceded by: John Major
- Succeeded by: Iain Duncan Smith
Ministerial offices
First Secretary of State
In office 12 May 2010 – 8 May 2015
Prime Minister	David Cameron
Preceded by	Peter Mandelson
Succeeded by	George Osborne
Leader of the House of Commons
In office 14 July 2014 – 8 May 2015
Prime Minister	David Cameron
Preceded by	Andrew Lansley
Succeeded by	Chris Grayling
Foreign Secretary
In office 12 May 2010 – 14 July 2014
Prime Minister	David Cameron
Preceded by	David Miliband
Succeeded by	Philip Hammond
Secretary of State for Wales
In office 5 July 1995 – 2 May 1997
Prime Minister	John Major
Preceded by	John Redwood
Succeeded by	Ron Davies
Junior ministerial offices
Minister of State for Social Security
In office 20 July 1994 – 5 July 1995
Prime Minister	John Major
Preceded by	Nicholas Scott
Succeeded by	Alistair Burt
Parliamentary Under-Secretary of State for Social Security
In office 27 May 1993 – 20 July 1994
Prime Minister	John Major
Preceded by	Ann Widdecombe
Succeeded by	Roger Evans
Shadow Cabinet posts
Senior Member of the Shadow Cabinet
In office 6 December 2005 – 11 May 2010
Leader	David Cameron
Preceded by	Michael Ancram (Note: as Deputy Leader of the Opposition)
Succeeded by	Jack Straw (Note: as Acting Shadow Deputy Prime Minister)
Shadow Foreign Secretary
In office 6 December 2005 – 11 May 2010
Leader	David Cameron
Preceded by	Liam Fox
Succeeded by	David Miliband
Shadow Secretary of State for Wales
In office 2 May 1997 – 19 June 1997
Leader	John Major
Preceded by	Ron Davies
Succeeded by	Michael Ancram
Shadow Constitutional Affairs Spokesperson
In office 2 May 1997 – 19 June 1997 Serving with Michael Howard
Leader	John Major
Preceded by	Office established
Succeeded by	Michael Ancram
Parliamentary offices
Member of the House of Lords
Lord Temporal
Life peerage 9 October 2015
Member of Parliament for Richmond (Yorks)
In office 23 February 1989 – 30 March 2015
Preceded by	Leon Brittan
Succeeded by	Rishi Sunak

Personal details
- Born: William Jefferson Hague; 26 March 1961 (age 65) Rotherham, West Riding of Yorkshire, England
- Party: Conservative
- Spouse: Ffion Jenkins (m. 1997)
- Education: Magdalen College, Oxford (BA); INSEAD (MBA)
- Website: williamhague.com

William Jefferson Hague, Baron Hague of Richmond (born 26 March 1961) is a British politician and life peer who was Leader of the Conservative Party and Leader of the Opposition from 1997 to 2001 and Deputy Leader from 2005 to 2010. He was the Member of Parliament (MP) for Richmond (Yorks) in North Yorkshire from 1989 to 2015. He was in the Cameron government as First Secretary of State from 2010 to 2015, Foreign Secretary from 2010 to 2014, and Leader of the House of Commons from 2014 to 2015. He has been Chancellor of the University of Oxford since February 2025. Hague was David Cameron’s Deputy as First Secretary of State, however, the Deputy Prime Minister title was held by Nick Clegg during the coalition.

Hague was educated at Wath-upon-Dearne Comprehensive School, the University of Oxford and INSEAD, subsequently being elected to the House of Commons at a by-election in 1989. Hague rose quickly through the ranks of the government of John Major and was appointed to Cabinet in 1995 as Secretary of State for Wales. Following the Conservatives' defeat at the 1997 general election by the Labour Party, he was elected Leader of the Conservative Party at the age of 36. Hague resigned as Conservative leader after the 2001 general election following his party's second defeat, at which the Conservatives made a net gain of just one seat. He returned to the backbenches, pursuing a career as an author, writing biographies of William Pitt the Younger and William Wilberforce. He also held several directorships, and worked as a consultant and public speaker. He was the first Leader of the Conservative Party since Austen Chamberlain (1921–1922) never to assume the office of Prime Minister.

After David Cameron was elected Leader of the Conservative Party in 2005, Hague was reappointed to the Shadow Cabinet as Shadow Foreign Secretary. He also assumed the role of Senior Member of the Shadow Cabinet, serving as Cameron's deputy. Following the formation of the coalition government in 2010, Hague was appointed First Secretary of State and Foreign Secretary. Cameron described him as his "de facto political deputy". On 14 July 2014, Hague stood down as Foreign Secretary and became Leader of the House of Commons. He did not stand for re-election at the 2015 general election and was succeeded, as MP for Richmond, by Rishi Sunak. He was awarded a life peerage in the 2015 Dissolution Honours List on 9 October 2015.

== Early life and education ==
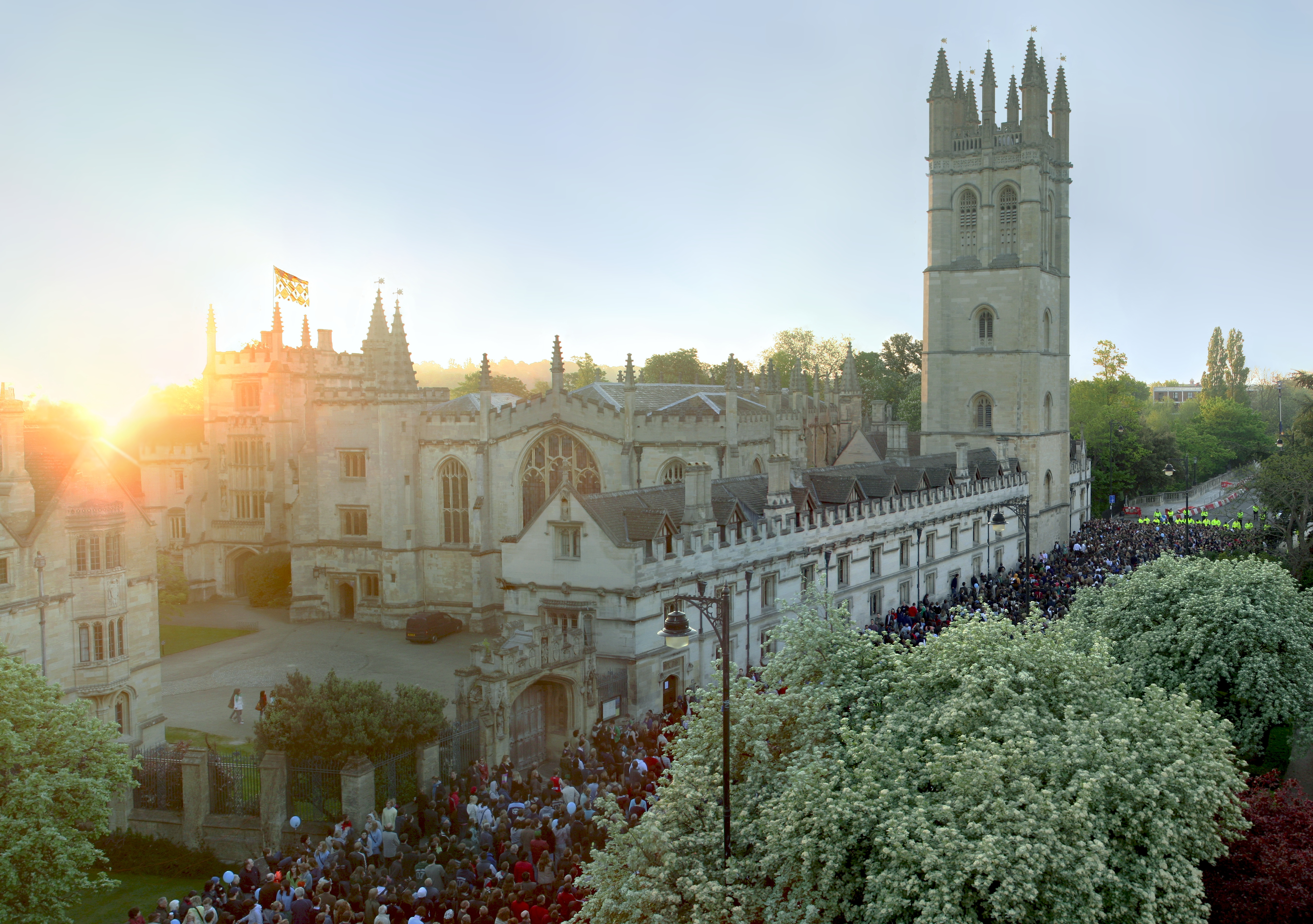
Magdalen College, Oxford

Hague was born on 26 March 1961 in Rotherham, West Riding of Yorkshire, England. He initially boarded at Ripon Grammar School and then attended Wath-upon-Dearne Comprehensive School, a state secondary school near Rotherham. His parents, Nigel and Stella Hague, ran a soft drinks manufacturing business where he worked during school holidays.

He first made the national news at the age of 16 by addressing the Conservatives at their 1977 Annual National Conference. In his speech he told the delegates: "half of you won't be here in 30 or 40 years' time..., but that others would have to live with consequences of a Labour Government if it stayed in power". Writing in his diary at the time Kenneth Rose noted that Peter Carrington told him that "he and several other frontbench Tories were nauseated by the much-heralded speech of a sixteen-year-old schoolboy called William Hague. Peter said to Norman St John-Stevas: 'If he is as priggish and self-assured as that at sixteen, what will he be like in thirty years' time? Norman replied: 'Like Michael Heseltine'".

Hague read philosophy, politics and economics at Magdalen College, Oxford, graduating with first-class honours "after last-minute cramming". He was President of the Oxford University Conservative Association (OUCA), but was "convicted of electoral malpractice" in the election process of his successor. OUCA's official historian, David Blair, notes that Hague was actually elected on a platform pledging to clean up OUCA, but that this was "tarnished by accusations that he misused his position as Returning Officer to help the Magdalen candidate for the presidency, Peter Havey. Hague was playing the classic game of using his powers as President to keep his faction in power, and Havey was duly elected.... There were accusations of blatant ballot box stuffing". He also served as President of the Oxford Union, an established route into politics.

After Oxford, Hague went on to study for a Master of Business Administration (MBA) degree at INSEAD, where he graduated with Distinction in 1986. He often refers to the year he spent there, living in Fontainebleau with friends from all over the world, as one of the happiest of his life. After the MBA, Hague got recruited and then worked as a management consultant at McKinsey & Company, where Archie Norman was his mentor.

== Public life ==
=== Early political career ===
Hague contested Wentworth unsuccessfully in 1987, before being elected to Parliament at a by-election in 1989 as Member for the safe Conservative seat of Richmond, North Yorkshire, where he succeeded former Home Secretary Leon Brittan. Following his election he became the then-youngest Conservative MP and despite having only recently become an MP, Hague was invited to join the Government in 1990, serving as Parliamentary Private Secretary to the Chancellor of the Exchequer, Norman Lamont. After Lamont was sacked in 1993, Hague moved to the Department of Social Security (DSS) where he was Parliamentary Under-Secretary of State. The following year he was promoted as Minister of State in the DSS with responsibility for Social Security and Disabled People. His fast rise up through Government ranks was attributed to his intelligence and debating skills.

Hague was appointed a Cabinet Minister in 1995 as Secretary of State for Wales; succeeding John Redwood, who had been castigated for being seen on TV apparently miming the Welsh national anthem at a conference; thus, Hague sought a Welsh Office civil servant, Ffion Jenkins, to teach him the words; they later married. He continued serving in Cabinet until the Conservatives were defeated after 18 years in government, by Labour at the 1997 general election.

=== Leadership of the Conservative Party ===
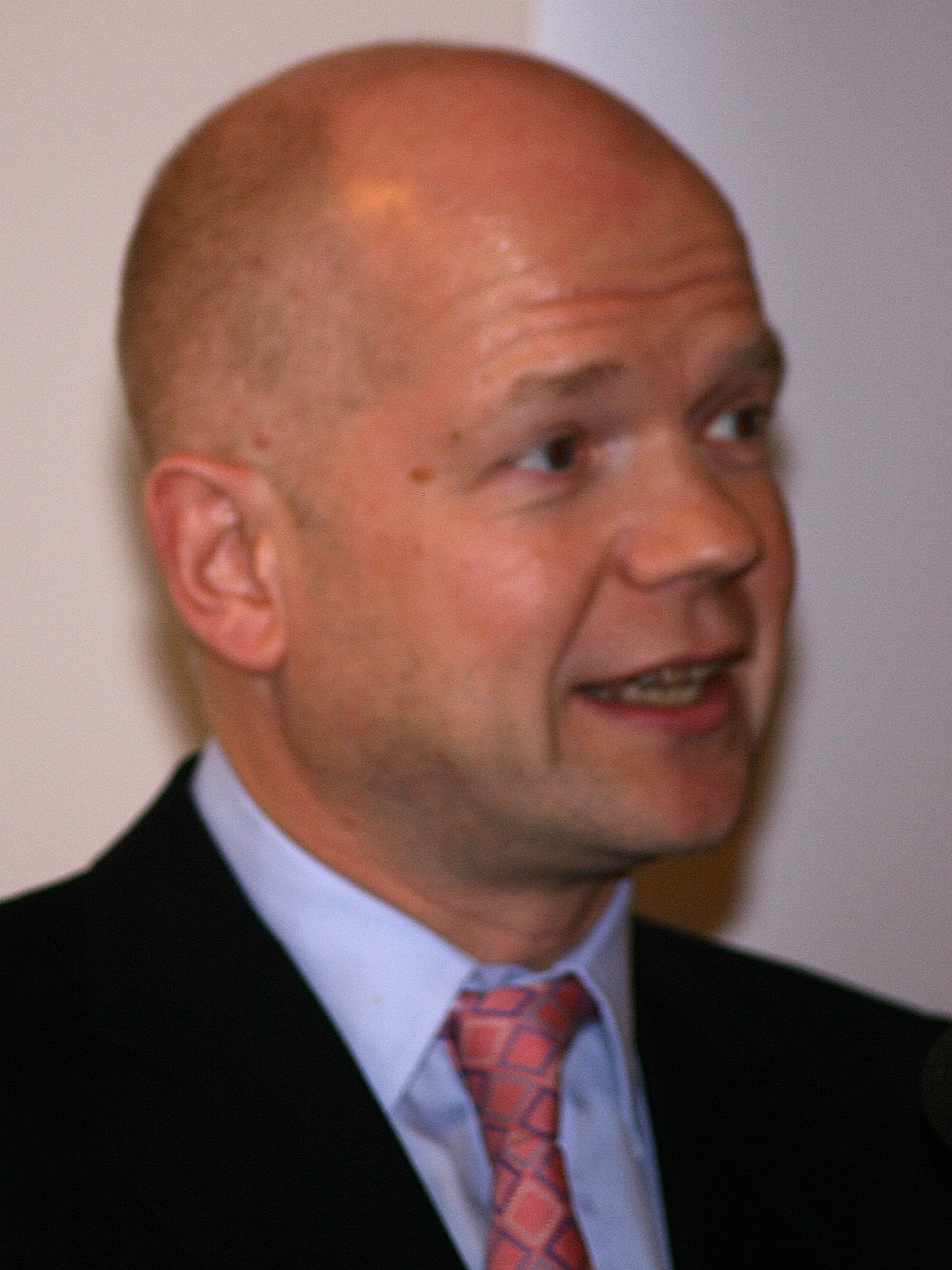
Hague in 2008

Following the 1997 general election defeat, Hague was elected Leader of the Conservative Party in succession to John Major, defeating more experienced figures such as Kenneth Clarke and Michael Howard. At the age of 36, Hague was tasked with rebuilding the Conservative Party (fresh from their worst general election result of the 20th century) by attempting to build a more modern image. £250,000 was spent on the "Listening to Britain" campaign to try to put the Conservatives back in touch with the public after losing power; he welcomed ideas about "compassionate conservatism" including from the then-Governor of Texas, later President George W. Bush.

Hague led the Conservatives to a successful result at the European parliamentary elections in June 1999, where the Conservatives gained 18 MEPs compared to Labour's loss of 33 MEPs.

Hague's authority was challenged by the appointment of Michael Portillo as Shadow Chancellor in 2000. Portillo had been widely tipped to be the next Conservative Party Leader before dramatically losing his seat at the 1997 general election; he was elected as MP for Kensington and Chelsea at a by-election two years later. Soon after Portillo's return to Parliament, Conservative policy on two of Labour's flagship policies was reversed: the minimum wage and independence of the Bank of England. From then and until the 2001 general election Hague's supporters waged an increasingly bitter battle with Portillo's faction; such internecine infighting significantly contributed to the Conservatives' two subsequent election defeats.

Hague was widely ridiculed for claiming he used to drink "14 pints of beer a day" as a teenager. His reputation suffered further damage when a 2001 poll for The Daily Telegraph found that 66% of voters considered him to be "a bit of a wally", and 70% of voters believed he would "say almost anything to win votes".

==== "Foreign Land" speech ====
At a Party Conference speech in March 2001, Hague said:

We have a Government that has contempt for the views of the people it governs.

There is nothing that the British people can talk about that this Labour Government doesn't deride.

Talk about Europe and they call you extreme. Talk about tax and they call you greedy. Talk about crime and they call you reactionary. Talk about immigration and they call you racist; talk about your nation and they call you Little Englanders.... This Government thinks Britain would be all right if we had a different people. I think Britain would be all right, if only we had a different government.

A Conservative government that speaks with the voice of the British people.

A Conservative government never embarrassed or ashamed of the British people.

A Conservative government that trusts the people [....] This country must always offer sanctuary to those fleeing from injustice. Conservative Governments always have, and always will. But it's precisely those genuine refugees who are finding themselves elbowed aside.

Former Conservative Deputy Prime Minister Michael Heseltine, a prominent One-nation Conservative, was critical of Hague's Eurosceptic view that Britain was becoming a "foreign land", betraying in newspaper interviews that he was uncertain as to whether he could support a Hague-led Conservative Party.

==== Skill in debate ====
Hague's critics assiduously monitored his performance at Prime Minister's Questions each Wednesday in Parliament, having difficulty to find fault. During one particular exchange, while responding to the Queen's Speech of 2000, Hague attacked Prime Minister Tony Blair's record:

In more than 20 years in politics, he has betrayed every cause he believed in, contradicted every statement he has made, broken every promise he has given and breached every agreement that he has entered into.... There is a lifetime of U-turns, errors and sell-outs. All those Honourable Members who sit behind the Prime Minister and wonder whether they stand for anything any longer, or whether they defend any point of principle, know who has led them to that sorry state.

Blair responded by criticising what he saw as Hague's "bandwagon politics":

... he started the fuel protest bandwagon, then the floods bandwagon; on defence it became armour-plated, then on air traffic control it became airborne.... Yes, the Right Honourable gentleman made a very witty, funny speech, but it summed up his leadership: good jokes, lousy judgment. I am afraid that in the end, if the Right Honourable gentleman really aspires to stand at this despatch box, he will have to get his policies sorted out and his party sorted out, and offer a vision for the country's future, not a vision that would take us backwards.

==== Resignation ====
On the morning of Labour's second consecutive landslide victory at the 2001 general election, Hague stated: "we have not been able to persuade a majority, or anything approaching a majority, that we are yet the alternative government that they need." At that election the Conservative Party gained just one parliamentary seat more than at the 1997 general election; following this defeat, Hague resigned as party leader. Hague thus became the second twentieth century Conservative party leader not to become Prime Minister (after Austen Chamberlain) and the first ever to spend his entire tenure in Opposition.

=== Backbenches ===
On the backbenches he occasionally spoke in the House of Commons on issues of the day. Between 1997 and 2002, he was the Chairman of the International Democrat Union. Hague's profile and personal popularity rose thereafter among both Conservative Party members and the wider public following his spell as Party Leader. He has written a biography of 18th-century Prime Minister Pitt the Younger (published in 2004), taught himself how to play the piano, and hosted the 25th anniversary programme for Radio 4 on the political television satire Yes Minister in 2005. In June 2007 he published his second book, a biography of the anti-slave trade campaigner William Wilberforce, shortlisted for the 2008 Orwell Prize for political writing.

Hague's annual income was the highest in Parliament, with earnings of about £400,000 a year from directorships, consultancy, speeches and his parliamentary salary. His income was previously estimated at £1 million annually, but he dropped several commitments and in effect took a salary cut of some £600,000 on becoming Shadow Foreign Secretary in 2005.

Together with former Prime Minister John Major, former Chancellor Kenneth Clarke, and Hague's successor Iain Duncan Smith, Hague served for a time on the Conservative Leadership Council, which was set up by Michael Howard upon his election unopposed as Leader of the Conservative Party in 2003.

At the 2005 Conservative leadership election he supported the eventual winner David Cameron. He is a member of Conservative Friends of Israel, a group which he joined when he was 15.

=== Return to the Shadow Cabinet ===
Following the 2005 general election, the Conservative Party Leader Michael Howard apparently offered Hague the post of Shadow Chancellor of the Exchequer, which he turned down citing that his business commitments would make it difficult for him to take on such a high-profile job.

On 6 December 2005, David Cameron was elected Leader of the Conservative Party. Hague was offered and accepted the role of Shadow Foreign Secretary and Senior Member of the Shadow cabinet, effectively serving as Cameron's deputy (though not formally, unlike previous Deputy Conservative Leaders William Whitelaw, Peter Lilley and Michael Ancram). He had been widely tipped to return to the frontbench under either Cameron or leadership contest runner-up David Davis.

On 30 January 2006, by Cameron's instructions, Hague travelled to Brussels for talks to pull Conservative Party MEPs out of the European People's Party–European Democrats Group (EPP-ED) in the European Parliament. (The Daily Telegraph, 30 January 2006). Further, on 15 February 2006, Hague deputed, during David Cameron's paternity leave, at Prime Minister's Questions (PMQs). This appearance gave rise to jokes at the expense of Blair, that all three parties that day were being led by 'stand-ins', with the Liberal Democrats represented by Acting Leader Sir Menzies Campbell, the Labour Party by the departing Blair, and the Conservatives by Hague. Hague again deputised for Cameron for several sessions in 2006.

=== Foreign secretary ===
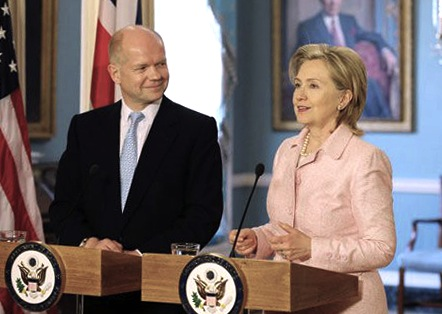
Hague met US Secretary of State Hillary Clinton following his appointment as Foreign Secretary.

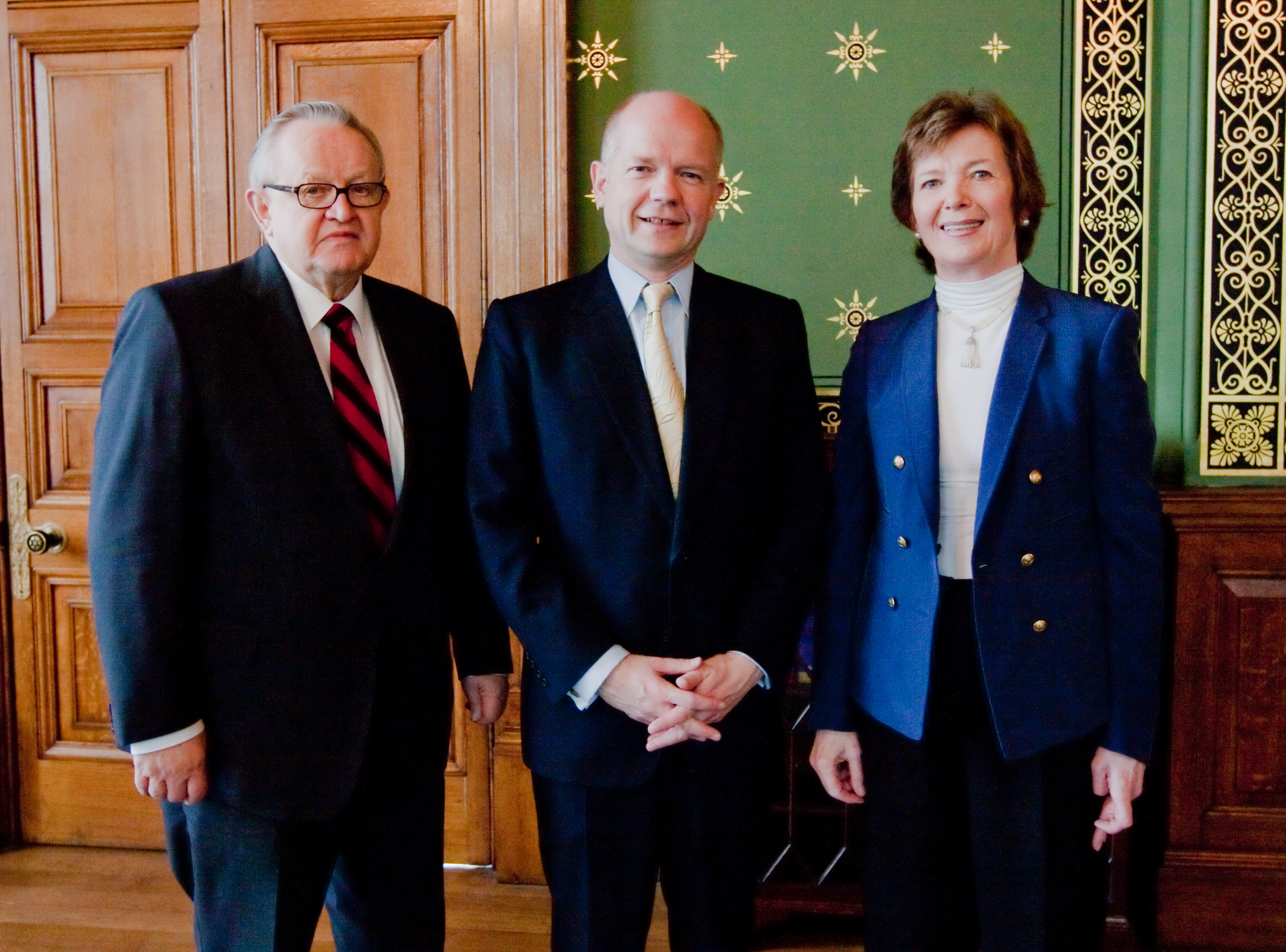
Hague stands with members of The Elders organisation: Martti Ahtisaari, former President of Finland and Nobel Peace Laureate, and Mary Robinson, former President of Ireland and former UN High Commissioner for Human Rights in London, 2010.

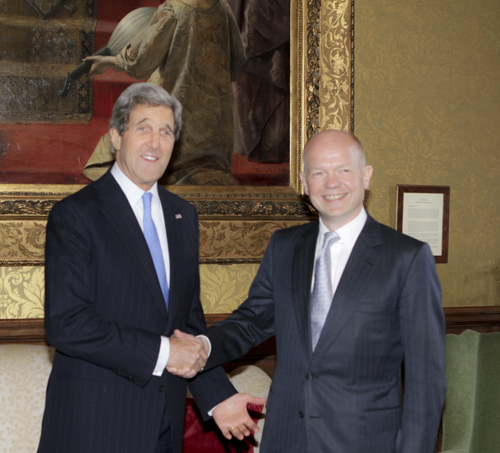
Hague met Clinton's successor, Secretary of State John Kerry, in 2013.

Prime Minister Cameron's first appointment was Hague as foreign secretary. He was also accorded the honorary title of First Secretary of State. In his first overseas visit as British Foreign Secretary, Hague met US Secretary of State, Hillary Clinton, at Washington.

In August 2010, Hague set out a values-based foreign policy, stating that: "We cannot have a foreign policy without a conscience. Foreign policy is domestic policy written large. The values we live by at home do not stop at our shores. Human rights are not the only issue that informs the making of foreign policy, but they are indivisible from it, not least because the consequences of foreign policy failure are human".

Hague further said that: "There will be no downgrading of human rights under this Government and no resiling from our commitments to aid and development". He continued by saying: "Indeed I intend to improve and strengthen our human rights work. It is not in our character as a nation to have a foreign policy without a conscience, and neither is it in our interests". However, in March 2011, Hague was criticised by Cardinal Keith O'Brien for increasing financial aid to Pakistan despite persecution of its Christian minority: "To increase aid to the Pakistan Government when religious freedom is not upheld and those who speak up for religious freedom are gunned down is tantamount to an anti-Christian foreign policy".

In September 2011, Hague told BBC Radio 4's File on 4 investigation Cyber Spies into the legality of domestic cyber surveillance and the export of this technology from the UK to countries with questionable human rights records that the UK had a strong export licence system. The programme also obtained confirmation from the UK's Department for Business Innovation and Skills that cyber surveillance products that break, as opposed to create, encryption do not require export licences.

In June 2012, he continued to stand in for David Cameron at PMQs when both the Prime Minister and Deputy Prime Minister Nick Clegg were out of the country.

In January 2013, Hague visited New Zealand in his capacity as Foreign Secretary, holding talks with New Zealand government ministers, Murray McCully and David Shearer. In March 2013, Hague established the International Leaders Programme, designed to identify and develop partnerships among future global leaders.

==== Media reaction to FCO appointment ====
In early September 2010, newspapers including The Daily Telegraph, The Independent and the Daily Mail released stories about allegations surrounding Hague's friendship with 25-year-old Christopher Myers, a history graduate from Durham University, whom he employed as a parliamentary special adviser. A spokesperson stated that "Any suggestion that the Foreign Secretary's relationship with Chris Myers is anything other than a purely professional one is wholly inaccurate and unfounded."

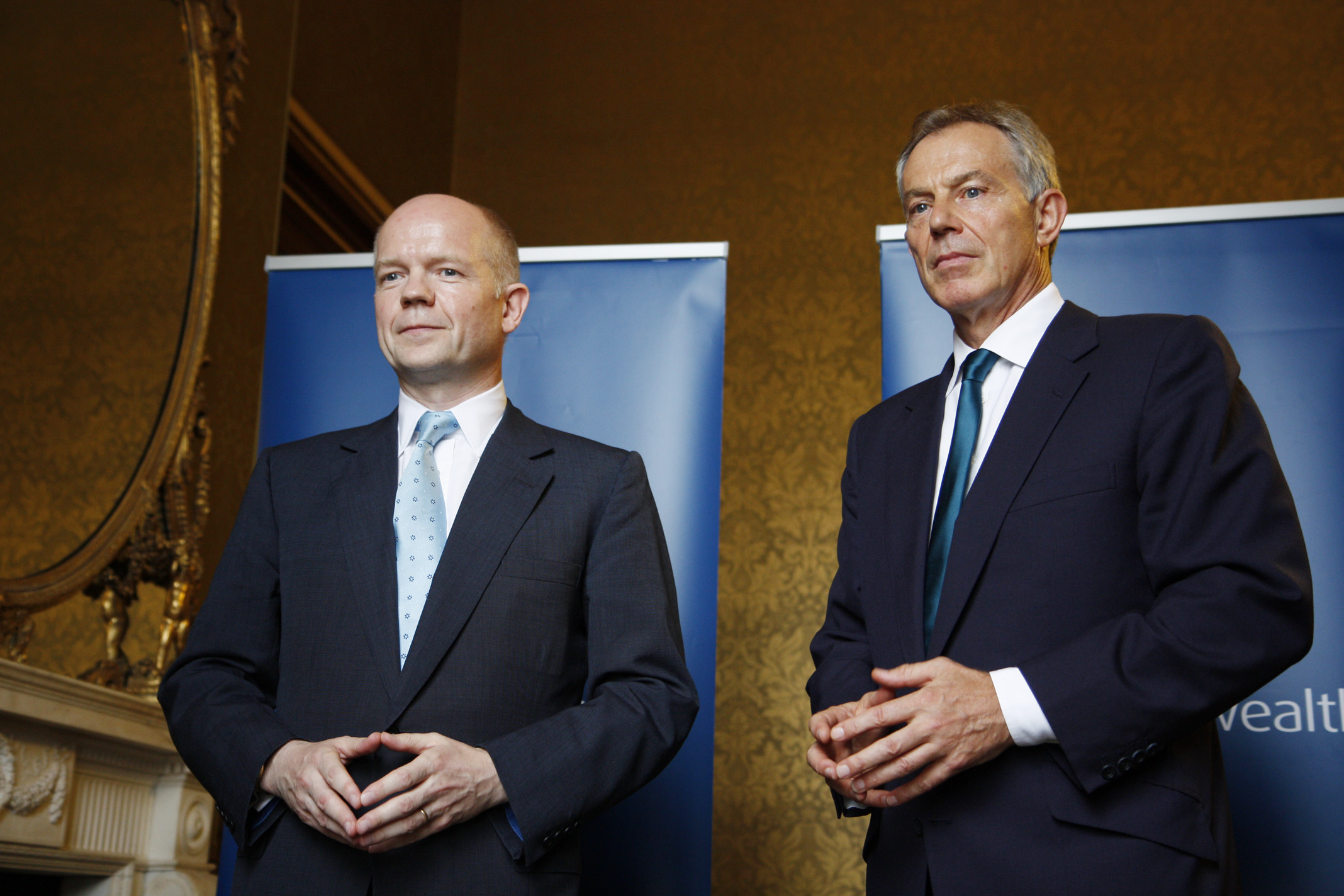
Hague with Quartet Representative and former prime minister Tony Blair in 2010

On 1 September 2010, Myers resigned from his appointment in light of that press speculation, which prompted Hague to issue a public statement, wherein he confirmed that he had "occasionally" shared a hotel room with Myers [for reasons of frugality by upbringing], but refuting the "utterly false" suggestions that he had ever been involved in a relationship with any man. A spokesperson for Prime Minister David Cameron reported that he gave his "full support" over the media rumours. Figures from both within and without the Conservative Party criticised Hague for his personal response to the stories, with former Conservative leadership candidate, John Redwood, commenting that Hague had shown "poor judgement", and the Speaker's wife, Labour-supporting Sally Bercow, speculating that Hague had been given "duff PR advice", whilst a parliamentary and ministerial colleague, the Conservative MP, Alan Duncan, described the media coverage as "contemptible".

==== Israel–Palestinian conflict ====
Hague was criticised by Israeli leaders after meeting with Palestinians who demonstrated against Israel's barrier in the West Bank. He expressed solidarity with the idea of non-violence and listened to the accounts of left-wing and Palestinian activists. Israeli Opposition Leader Tzipi Livni condemned the statements and said:

The security barrier has saved lives, and its construction was necessary. The barrier has separated Israel from Palestinian cities and completely changed the reality in Israel, where citizens were exposed to terror every day.

==== 2011 Middle East protests ====
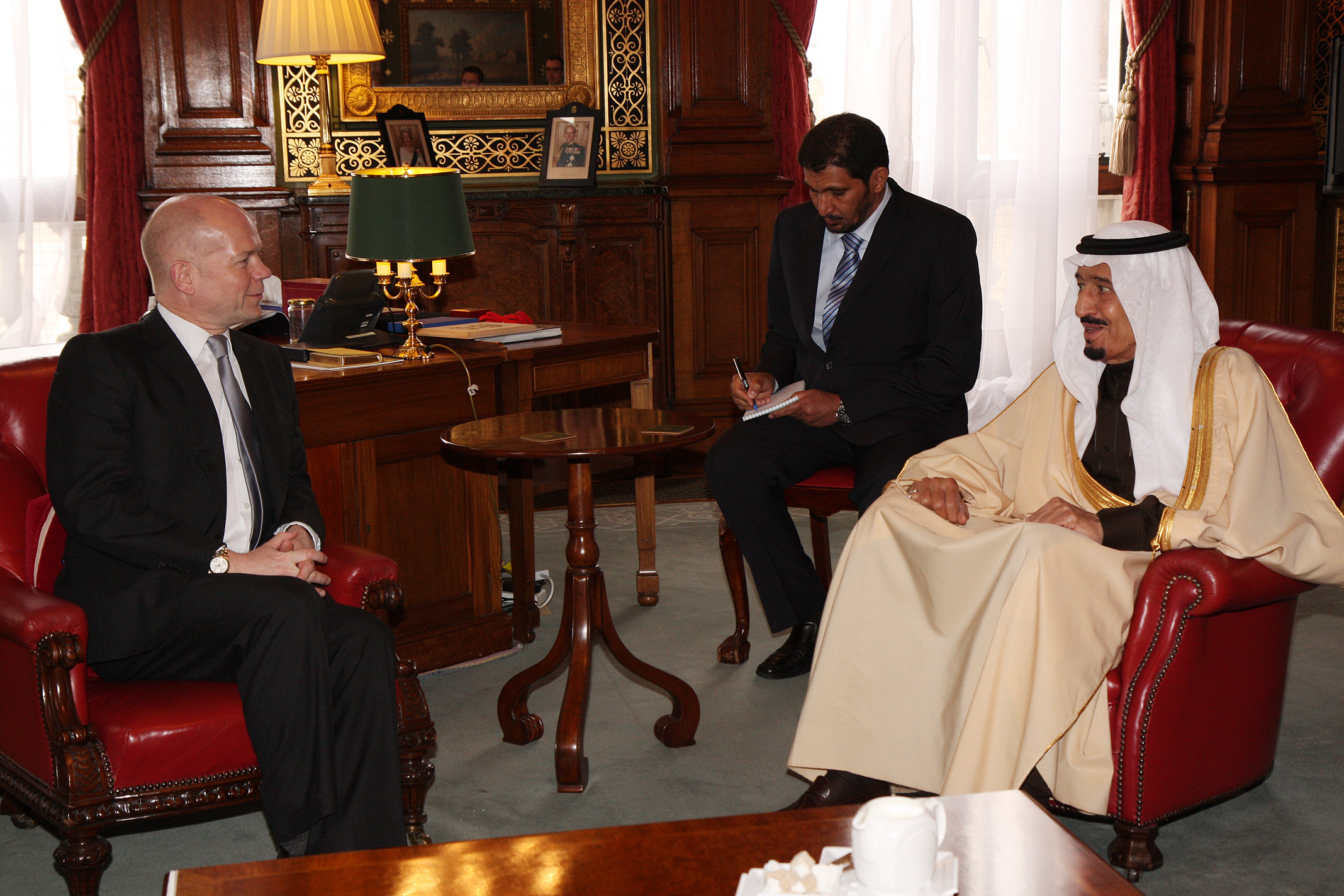
Hague meeting Saudi Defence Minister Salman of Saudi Arabia in London, 4 April 2012

In February 2011 security forces in the Bahrain dispersed thousands of anti-government protesters at Pearl Square in the centre of the capital, Manama. Hague informed the House of Commons that he had stressed the need for peaceful action in dealing with the protesters: "At least three people died in the operation, with hundreds more injured. We are greatly concerned about the deaths that have occurred. I have this morning spoken to the Foreign Minister of Bahrain and HM Ambassador spoke last night to the Bahraini Minister of the Interior. In both cases we stressed the need for peaceful action to address the concerns of protesters, the importance of respect for the right to peaceful protest and for freedom of expression".

Hague told Sky News that the use of force by the Libyan authorities during the 2011 Libyan Civil War was "dreadful and horrifying" and called on the leader to respect people's human rights. A vicious crackdown led by special forces, foreign mercenaries and Muammar Gaddafi loyalists was launched in the country's second city Benghazi, which has been the focus of anti-regime protests. Hague stated to Dermot Murnaghan on Sky: "I think we have to increase the international pressure and condemnation. The United Kingdom condemns what the Libyan Government has been doing and how they have responded to these protests, and we look to other countries to do the same".

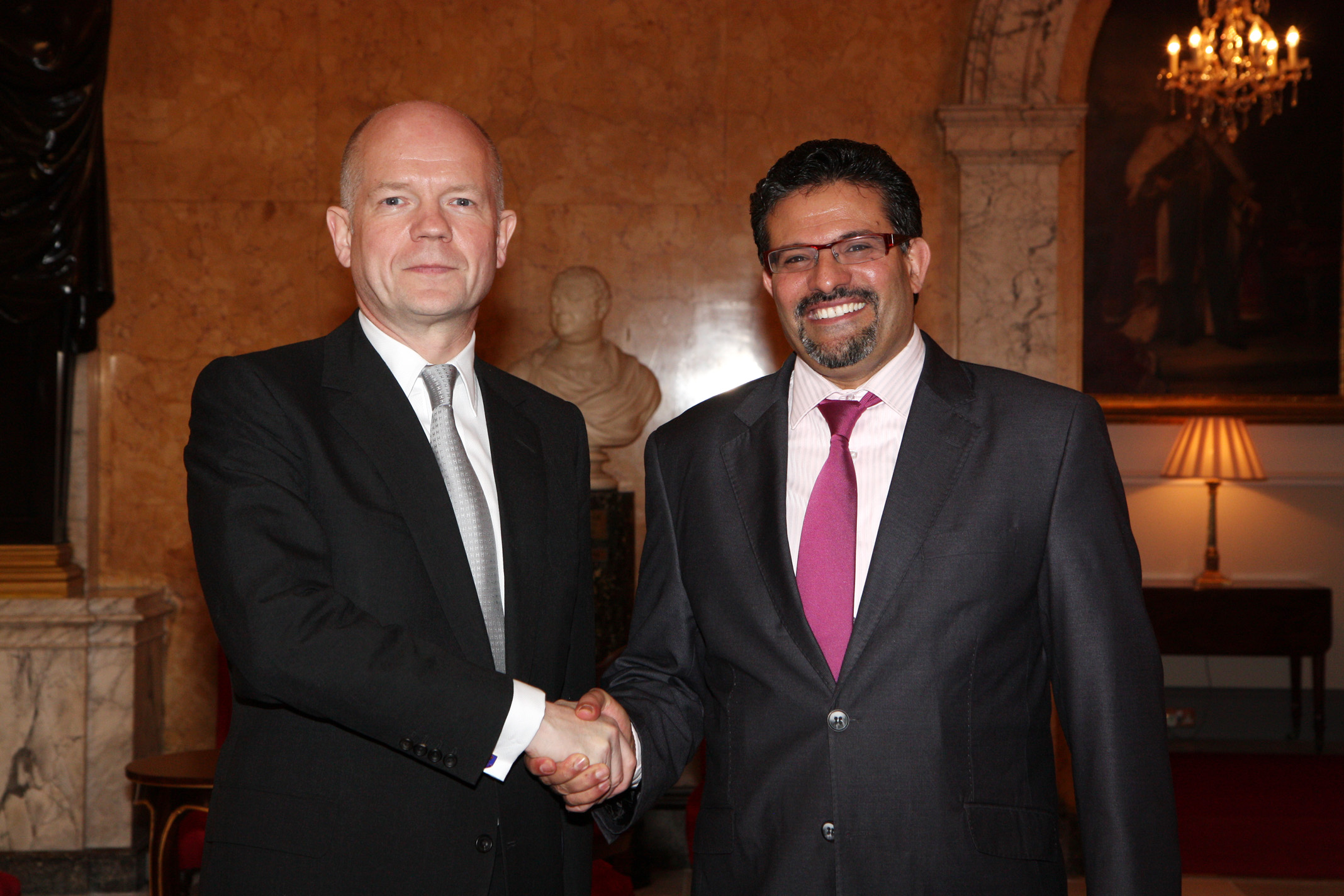
Foreign Secretary William Hague meeting Tunisian Foreign Affairs Minister Rafik Abdessalem, 2012

Following delays in extracting British citizens from Libya, a disastrous helicopter attempt to contact the protesters ending with eight British diplomats/SAS arrested and no aircraft carriers or Harriers to enforce a no-fly zone he was accused, by the Labour Opposition, of "losing his mojo" in March 2011.

In March 2011, Hague said in a speech to business leaders that the examples being set in North Africa and the Middle East will ultimately transform the relationship between governments and their populations in the region. However following the row over whether Libyan leader Muammar Gaddafi was being targeted by coalition forces, the Foreign Secretary stated that the Libyan people must be free to determine their own future. Hague said: "It is not for us to choose the government of Libya—that is for the Libyan people themselves. But they have a far greater chance of making that choice now than they did on Saturday, when the opposition forces were on the verge of defeat."

Hague has warned that autocratic leaders including Robert Mugabe, President of Zimbabwe, could be shaken and even toppled by a wave of popular uprisings rippling out from North Africa. He said that recent revolts against authoritarian leaders in countries including Libya and Egypt will have a greater historic significance than the 9/11 attacks on the US or the recent financial crisis. He stopped short of threatening military intervention against other dictators, but warned that they will inevitably face "judgement" for oppressing their people and suppressing democracy. Repressive African regimes will also face challenges from their populations and from the international community, Hague said: "Demands for freedom will spread, and that undemocratic governments elsewhere should take heed." He added: "Governments that use violence to stop democratic development will not earn themselves respite forever. They will pay an increasingly high price for actions which they can no longer hide from the world with ease, and will find themselves on the wrong side of history."

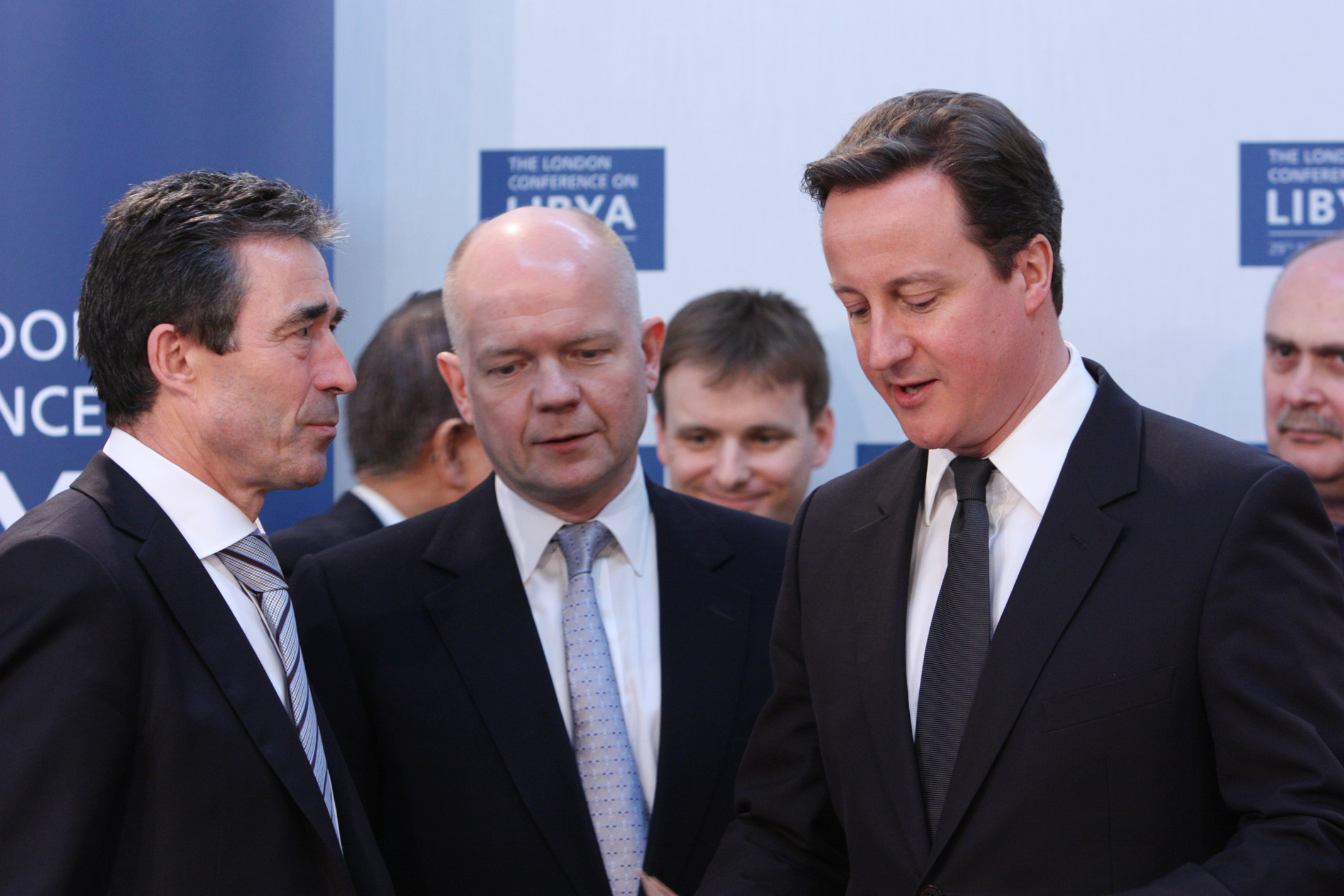
Hague and David Cameron speaking to NATO Secretary General Anders Fogh Rasmussen at the London Conference on Libya, 29 March 2011

Hague, on his way to Qatar Summit in April 2011, called for intensified sanctions on the Libyan regime and for a clear statement that Gaddafi must go: "we have sent more ground strike aircraft in order to protect civilians. We do look to other countries to do the same, if necessary, over time". "We would like a continued increase in our (NATO's) capability to protect civilians in Libya", he added. Whether NATO ratcheted up operations depended on what happened on the ground, Hague said. "These air strikes are a response to movements of, or attacks from, regime forces so what happens will be dependent on that", he said. Whether the Americans could again be asked to step up their role would also "depend on the circumstances", he added.

Hague, speaking on the protests in Syria, said: "Political reforms should be brought forward and implemented without delay." It is thought as many as 60 people were killed by security forces in the country on 22 April 2011, making it the worst day for deaths since protests against President Bashar al-Assad began over a month prior, reported BBC News.

==== Syria ====
Speaking on the Syrian civil war in August 2011, Hague dismissed the possibility of intervention. He cited the lack of a call from the Arab League as with Libya, as well as legal and moral justification. Hague added that it was a "frustrating situation" and that the "levers" at the international community's disposal were severely limited, but countries had to concentrate on other ways of influencing the Assad government. He advocated pressure from the West, the Arab nations, and Turkey, as well as a United Nations Security Council resolution.

During 2012, the UK started training Syrian opposition activists in Istanbul on media, civil society and local government matters, and supplying non-lethal equipment such as satellite communications and computers.

On 24 February 2012, Hague recognised the Syrian National Council as a "legitimate representative" of the country. Hague also said Bashar al-Assad's government had "forfeited the right to lead" by "miring itself in the blood of innocent people". He added that "Those responsible for the murder of entire families, the shelling of homes, the execution of detainees, the cleansing of political opponents and the torture and rape of women and children must be held to account",.

In March 2012, Hague ordered the evacuation of all British diplomats from Syria and closed the UK embassy in Damascus because of mounting security threats. Hague told Parliament that while the embassy was maintained to communicate with all parties and to observe the situation, the threats put the embassy at risk. Hague said that his decision "in no way reduces the UK's commitment to active diplomacy to maintain pressure on the Assad regime to end the violence".

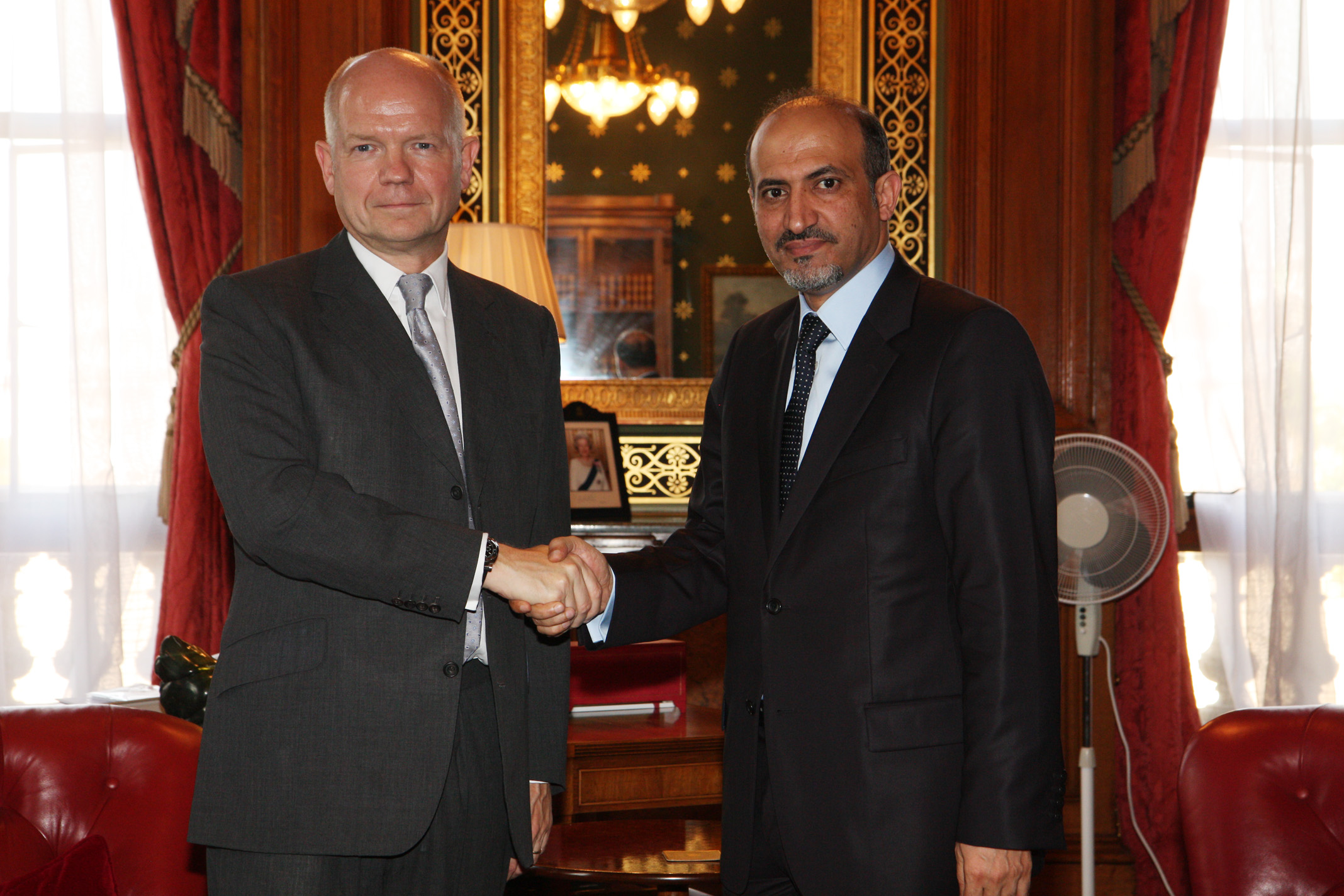
Hague meeting Ahmad Jarba, President of the National Coalition of Syrian Revolutionary and Opposition Forces, on 5 September 2013

On 1 April 2012, Hague met 74 other nations at a Friends of Syria Group conference in Istanbul, Turkey. Hague said the issue could return to the United Nations Security Council if current efforts to resolve the crisis fail. The government of President Assad has said it accepts a peace plan by the UN-Arab League envoy Kofi Annan, but there has been little evidence that it is prepared to end its crackdown on the opposition. Hague accused Assad of "stalling for time" and warned that if the issue does return to the Security Council, he may no longer be able to rely on the backing of Russia and China, who blocked a previous resolution calling for him to stand down. "There isn't an unlimited period of time for this, for the Kofi Annan process to work before many of the nations here want us to go back to the UN Security Council—some of them will call for arming the opposition if there isn't progress made," Hague told the BBC. He added that "What is now being put to them is a plan from Kofi Annan supported by the whole United Nations Security Council, and this is an important point, it's supported by Russia and by China as well as by the more obvious countries—the United States, the United Kingdom, France, the Arab League and so on".

On 20 November 2012, Hague recognised the National Coalition for Syrian Revolutionary and Opposition Forces as the "sole legitimate representative" of the Syrian people, and a credible alternative to the current Syrian Government.

On 29 August 2013, the British Parliament refused to ratify the British Government's plan to participate in military strikes against the Syrian Government in the wake of a chemical-weapons attack at Ghouta. Hague denied suggestions that he had threatened to resign over Prime Minister David Cameron's decision to go straight to a parliamentary vote. After the vote, Hague continued to urge other governments to take action against the Syrian Government, saying "If it is decided in the various parliaments of the world that no-one will stand up to the use of chemical weapons and take any action about that, that would be a very alarming moment in the affairs of the world". Ultimately a negotiated agreement was reached to eliminate Syria's chemical weapons.

==== Proposal of elected EU presidency ====
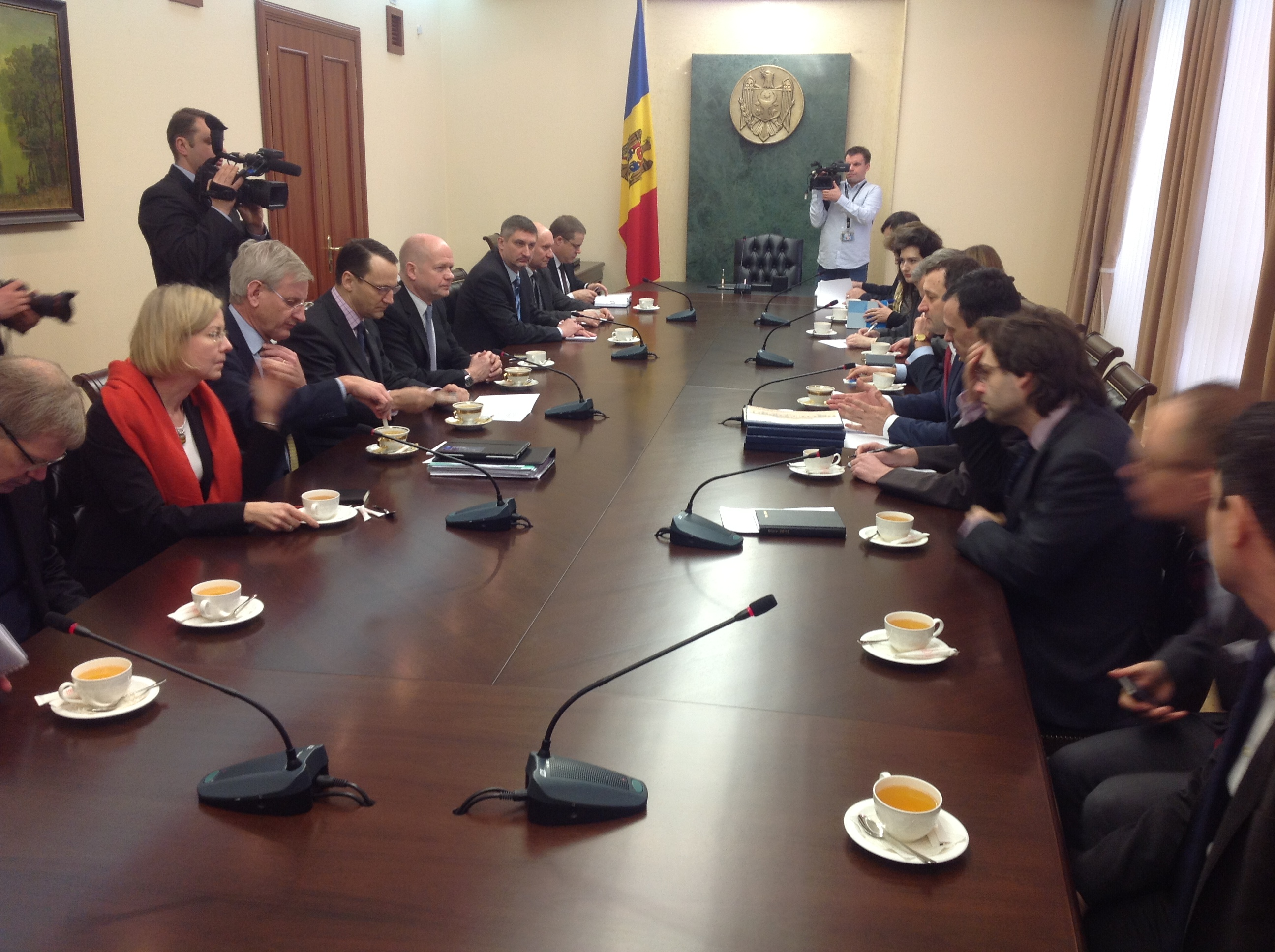
Hague, Carl Bildt and Radosław Sikorski meeting Vlad Filat, Prime Minister of Moldova, February 2013

In June 2011, Hague dismissed Tony Blair's vision for an elected-head of the European Union by insisting that member states have more pressing priorities than further "constitutional tinkering". Hague made clear his view after Blair argued that a directly elected President of Europe, representing almost 400m people from 27 countries, would give the EU clear leadership and enormous authority. In an interview with The Times, Blair set out the agenda that he thought a directly elected EU President should pursue, although he conceded, there was "no chance" of such a post being created "at the present time". Asked about the former Prime Minister's call for further European integration and the creation of an elected-President, Hague suggested that Blair may have been thinking of the role for himself. "I can't think who he had in mind", Hague joked, further adding on a serious note: "Elected presidents are for countries. The EU is not a country and it's not going to become a country, in my view, now or ever in the future. It is a group of countries working together".

==== Taliban talks ====
In June 2011, Hague said that Britain helped initiate "distasteful" peace talks with the Taliban in Afghanistan. Hague made the comments while on a three-day tour of the country to meet President Hamid Karzai and visited British troops. He told The Sun newspaper that Britain had led the way in persuading US President Barack Obama's administration that negotiation was the best potential solution to the conflict. Hague admitted that any deal might mean accepting "distasteful things" and could anger military veterans and relatives of the 374 British troops killed in Afghanistan. However, he said he believed that Britain as a whole was "realistic and practical" enough to accept that ending fighting and starting talks was the best way to safeguard national security. He told the newspaper: "An eventual settlement of these issues is the ultimate and most desirable way of safeguarding that national security." He added, "but reconciliation with people who have been in a military conflict can be very distasteful. In all these types of situations, you do have to face up to some distasteful things." The previous night US President Barack Obama told Americans that "the tide of war is receding" as he announced plans to withdraw 33,000 US troops from Afghanistan by September 2012.

==== Comments on the Euro ====
In September 2011, Hague said that the Euro is "a burning building with no exits" for some of the countries which adopted the currency. Hague first used the expression when he was Conservative Leader in 1998—and said in an interview with The Spectator he had been proved right: "It was folly to create this system. It will be written about for centuries as a kind of historical monument to collective folly. But it's there and we have to deal with it," he said. "I described the Euro as a burning building with no exits and so it has proved for some of the countries in it," he further said, adding "I might take the analogy too far but the Euro wasn't built with exits so it is very difficult to leave it".

==== Iran ====
In February 2012, Hague warned in a BBC interview about Iran's "increasing willingness to contemplate" terrorism around the world. He cited the 2011 Iran assassination plot, an attempt to assassinate Adel al-Jubeir, the Saudi Ambassador to the United States, as well as alleged involvement in recent attacks in New Delhi, Georgia, and Bangkok. He said it showed "the danger Iran is currently presenting to the peace of the world".

Hague spoke the Commons on 20 February about the nuclear program of Iran and said that if the Tehran regime managed to construct a viable weapon, its neighbours would be forced to build their own nuclear warheads too. He accused Iranian President Mahmoud Ahmadinejad of pursuing "confrontational policies" and described the country's enrichment of uranium in defiance of United Nations Security Council resolutions as "a crisis coming steadily down the track". "Our policy is that whilst we remain unswervingly committed to diplomacy, it is important to emphasise to Iran that all options are on the table," Hague told MPs.

In March he condemned the way parliamentary elections were staged, claiming they were not "free and fair". He said the poll had been held against a backdrop of fear that meant the result would not reflect the will of the people. Hague said: "It has been clear for some time that these elections would not be free and fair. "The regime has presented the vote as a test of loyalty, rather than an opportunity for people freely to choose their own representatives. The climate of fear, created by the regime's crushing of opposition voices since 2009, persists."

==== Falkland Islands ====
The 30th anniversary of the beginning of the 1982 Falklands War was on 2 April 2012. On 29 March, before the Lord Mayor of London's banquet guests, namely the entire foreign diplomatic corps of more than 100 ambassadors, including Alicia Castro (Argentinian Ambassador), Hague said the UK was keen to deepen its relationship with Latin America—and reiterated Britain's commitment to the Falklands. He said: "We are reversing Britain's decline in Latin America, where we are opening a new Embassy in El Salvador. This determination to deepen our relations with Latin America is coupled with our steadfast commitment to the right of self-determination of the people of the Falkland Islands".

Tensions over the Falklands had risen in the weeks prior to the anniversary. In February, Hague said deployments of a British warship, HMS Dauntless and the Duke of Cambridge to the Falklands were "entirely routine". Hague said that Britain affirmed the Falklanders' self-determination and would seek to prevent Argentina from "raising the diplomatic temperature" over the issue. He further said: "(the events) are not so much celebrations as commemorations. I think Argentina will also be holding commemorations of those who died in the conflict. Since both countries will be doing that I don't think there is anything provocative about that."

==== Turks and Caicos Islands ====
Hague set out Her Majesty's Government's plans, on 12 June 2012, for the reintroduction of self-government in the Turks and Caicos Islands, where direct rule of the Governor had been in place since the islands had been subject to corruption and maladministration under the previous autonomous administration.

==== Julian Assange and right of asylum ====
In August 2012, Hague declared that Julian Assange, the WikiLeaks organisation founder, would not be granted political asylum by the United Kingdom. Hague declared the UK's willingness to extradite Assange to the Swedish authorities who had requested his extradition; thus Swedish prosecutors, unwilling to break diplomatic protocol, have deferred from interrogating Assange at the Embassy of Ecuador, London.

Hague confirmed the British Government's position – that it is lawfully obliged to extradite Julian Assange. "We're disappointed by the statement by Ecuador's Foreign Minister today that Ecuador has offered political asylum to Julian Assange. Under our Laws, with Mr. Assange having exhausted all options of appeal, the British authorities are under a binding obligation to extradite him to Sweden. We must carry out that obligation and of course we fully intend to do so," Hague confirmed.

Following The Guardian newspaper outcry over a Foreign Office note sanctioned by Hague sent to the Ecuadorian Embassy—in which it raised the possibility of the revocation of their diplomatic status under the Diplomatic and Consular Premises Act 1987—the Foreign Secretary reaffirmed the UK remained "committed to a diplomatic solution" and played down any suggestion of a police raid of the Ecuadorian Embassy, stating "there is no threat here to storm an embassy".

The former ambassador to Uzbekistan, Craig Murray, warned that using the 1987 Act to raid the Ecuadorian Embassy would be in "breach of the Vienna Convention of 1961". Russia warned Britain against violating fundamental diplomatic principles (Vienna Convention on Diplomatic Relations, and in particular the Article 22 spelling out the inviolability of diplomatic premises), which the Government of Ecuador invoked.

Hague is the subject of a portrait in oil commissioned by Parliament.

=== Leader of the House of Commons and retirement ===
Once Hague had formally declared his intention not to seek re-election as MP for Richmond at the forthcoming 2015 general election, he told David Cameron he would be standing down as Foreign Secretary. Cameron instigated a Cabinet reshuffle whereby Hague became Leader of the House of Commons. Hague remained as Cameron's "de facto political deputy", retained his membership of the National Security Council and played a lead role in reaching out to voters in the North of England in the run up to the general election.

In a surprise motion on his last day in the House of Commons, Hague moved to make the election for Speaker in the next parliament a secret ballot, in what was seen as an effort to oust the incumbent John Bercow for lacking the neutrality expected of a Speaker of the House. Charles Walker, Conservative MP for Broxbourne, Chairman of the Procedure Committee and responsible for Speaker elections, stated that he had written a report about such an idea "years ago" and despite speaking with Hague and Michael Gove earlier that week, neither had told him of any such move. A visibly emotional Walker told the House, "I have been played as a fool. When I go home tonight, I will look in the mirror and see an honourable fool looking back at me. I would much rather be an honourable fool, in this and any other matter, than a clever man." Walker received a standing ovation, mainly from the Labour benches, while the Government lost its parliamentary motion by 228 to 202 votes. During the debate, Labour MP Gerald Kaufman denounced Hague, saying: "Is the right hon. Gentleman aware that this grubby decision is what he personally will be remembered for? After a distinguished career in the House of Commons, both as a leader of a party and as a senior Cabinet Minister, he has now descended to squalor in the final days of the Parliament."

He was succeeded as MP for Richmond (Yorks) by future Chancellor of the Exchequer, future Prime Minister, and future Leader of the Opposition Rishi Sunak.

== In retirement ==
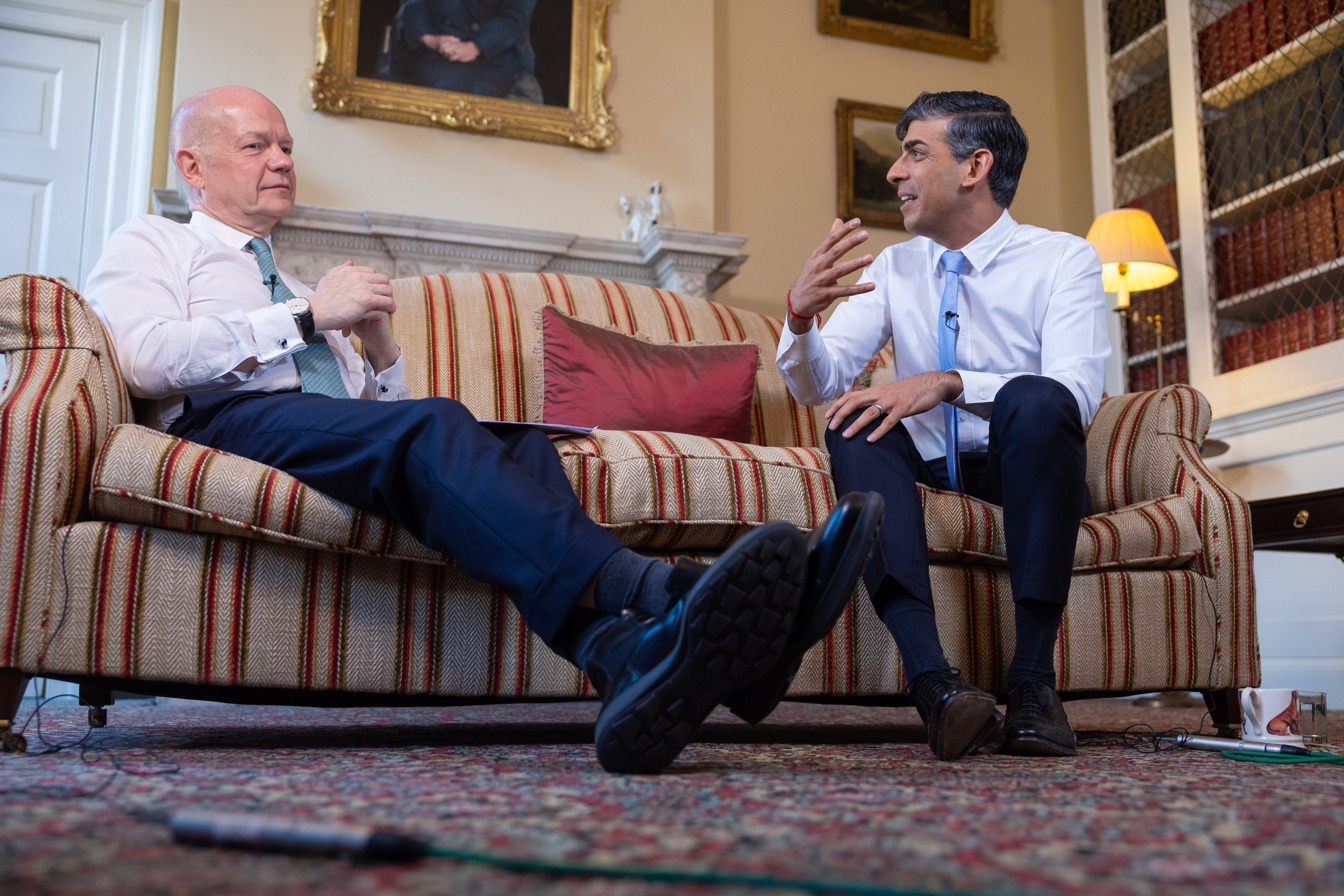
Hague interviewing Rishi Sunak in 2024

On 9 October 2015, Hague was created Baron Hague of Richmond, of Richmond in the County of North Yorkshire.

In August 2020, Hague endorsed Joe Biden for US president over incumbent Donald Trump, arguing that a Biden victory was in the UK's interest. In 2025, Hague became the honorary patron of GEMS School of Research and Innovation in Dubai, the United Arab Emirates.

=== Illegal wildlife trade fighter ===
Hague and the then Duke of Cambridge identified, while the former was in post as Foreign Secretary, that the illegal wildlife trade (IWT) was among the most profitable criminal enterprises in the world, and in order to combat it formed in 2014 the Transport Task Force (TTF). The TTF seeks to identify and stop wildlife trafficking. They continue to work at this in 2020. The Financial Task Force was created in 2018 to help further the goal.

=== Royal Foundation ===
In September 2020, Hague was appointed chairman of the Royal Foundation, the charity which supports the non-profit work of the Prince and Princess of Wales (then known as Duke and Duchess of Cambridge), in succession to Sir Keith Mills, who retired. (Note: It was previously known as "The Royal Foundation of The Duke and Duchess of Cambridge and Prince Harry" and then "The Royal Foundation of The Duke and Duchess of Cambridge" before being renamed "The Royal Foundation of The Prince and Princess of Wales" in September 2022.) He was succeeded as chairman by Simon Patterson, a managing director at the private equity firm Silver Lake.

=== Chancellor of the University of Oxford ===
See also 2024 University of Oxford Chancellor election

In October 2024, Hague put himself forward as a candidate for Chancellor of Oxford University. He wrote in a 750 word statement: "Oxford transformed my life. When I arrived as a 17-year-old from a comprehensive school for an interview at Magdalen, I didn't know a single person in the whole city, and no one in my family had ever been to university. I have never forgotten how Oxford equipped me to take on any challenge in the world."

On 27 November 2024, the University announced that Hague had been elected Chancellor. He formally assumed the role in January 2025.

== Publications ==
Hague is an author of political biographies, and since his retirement from public life he has maintained a weekly column in first the Daily Telegraph and subsequently The Times. Hague also writes the occasional book review and appears on TV shows and in radio presentations.

=== As author ===
- Hague, William (May 2005). William Pitt the Younger: A Biography. Harper Perennial. ISBN 978-0-00-714720-5.
- Hague, William (May 2008). William Wilberforce: The Life of the Great Anti-Slave Trade Campaigner. Harper Perennial. ISBN 978-0-00-722886-7.
- Hague, William (June 2010). The Times Great Military Lives: Leadership and Courage – from Waterloo to the Falklands in Obituaries. Times Books. ISBN 978-0-00-735930-1. (Foreword)

=== As columnist ===
==== On coronavirus ====
Hague has written about the COVID-19 pandemic, writing as early as 10 February 2020 that "Coronavirus is a calamity for China. It cannot continue its dangerous wildlife practices any longer." Hague wrote on 2 March that: "The rise of coronavirus is a clear indication that the degrading of nature will come back to hit humans very hard." Hague returned to the subject on 13 April, when he said that the "world must act now on wildlife markets or run the risk of worse pandemics in future".

== Personal life ==
Hague married Ffion Jenkins at the Chapel of St Mary Undercroft on 19 December 1997.

Hague serves as a vice-president of the Friends of the British Library, which provides funding support for the British Library to make new acquisitions. He is President of the Britain–Australia Society. Hague practises judo, and has a keen interest in music, learning to play the piano shortly after the 2001 general election. He is an enthusiast for the natural history and countryside of his native Yorkshire.

In 2015, Hague purchased a £2.5 million country house, Cyfronydd Hall, in Powys, Wales.

== Honours and awards ==
- 1995: Sworn in as a member of Her Majesty's Most Honourable Privy Council giving him the Honorific title "The Right Honourable" for life.
- 1998: The Spectator's "Parliamentarian of the Year Award"
- 2005: History Book of the Year at the British Book Awards, for William Pitt the Younger
- 2007: The Spectator's "Speech of the Year Award"
- 2008: The Trustees' Award at the Longman–History Today Awards
- 2009: Fellow of the Royal Society of Literature (FRSL)
- 2014: Britain-Australia Society Award for contribution to the relationship between Britain and Australia
- 2015: Freeman of the City of London
- 2015: Liveryman of the Worshipful Company of Stationers and Newspaper Makers
- 2015: Life peerage
- 2016: Honorary Degree from the University of York
- 2017: Grand Cordon of the Order of the Rising Sun (Japan)
- 2018: Honorary Degree of Doctor of Laws (LL.D) from Lancaster University
- 2025: Appointed Commander of the Royal Victorian Order (CVO) in the 2026 New Year Honours

=== Arms ===
Hague was granted arms on 7 April 2016

Coat of arms of William Hague
Crest An American bald eagle wings expanded Proper resting the dexter claws on a mullet Or. Escutcheon Azure a representation of the Keep of Richmond Castle between in fess two roses Argent barbed and seeded Proper all between three lions passant two and one Or. Supporters Dexter a polar bear Proper, sinister a dragon Gules. Motto Historia Est Vitae Magistra

== In popular culture ==
Hague was portrayed by Alex Avery in the 2015 Channel 4 television film Coalition.

== See also ==
- Tory Boy

== Notes ==
Parliament of the United Kingdom
Preceded by Leon Brittan	Member of Parliament for Richmond (Yorks); 1989–2015	Succeeded by Rishi Sunak
Political offices
Preceded by David Hunt	Secretary of State for Wales; 1995–1997	Succeeded by Ron Davies
Preceded by Ron Davies	Shadow Secretary of State for Wales; 1997	Succeeded by Michael Ancram
New office	Shadow Constitutional Affairs Spokesperson; 1997; Served alongside: Michael Howard	Succeeded by Michael Ancram
Preceded by John Major	Leader of the Opposition; 1997–2001	Succeeded by Iain Duncan Smith
Preceded by Michael Ancram	Deputy Leader of the Opposition; 2005–2010	Succeeded by Jack Straw; Acting as Shadow Deputy Prime Minister of the United Kingdom
New office	Senior Member of the Shadow Cabinet; 2005–2010	Succeeded by Jack Straw; Acting as Shadow Deputy Prime Minister of the United Kingdom
Preceded by Liam Fox	Shadow Foreign Secretary; 2005–2010	Succeeded by David Miliband
Preceded by David Miliband	Foreign Secretary; 2010–2014	Succeeded by Philip Hammond
Preceded by Peter Mandelson	First Secretary of State; 2010–2015	Succeeded by George Osborne
Preceded by Andrew Lansley	Leader of the House of Commons; 2014–2015	Succeeded by Chris Grayling
Party political offices
Preceded by John Major	Leader of the Conservative Party; 1997–2001	Succeeded by Iain Duncan Smith
Orders of precedence in the United Kingdom
Preceded by The Lord Foster of Bath	Gentlemen; Baron Hague of Richmond	Followed by The Lord Barker of Battle
Academic offices
Preceded by Chris Patten	Chancellor of the University of Oxford; 2025–present	Incumbent
