= Kenneth Burton =

British biochemist

Kenneth Burton FRS (26 June 1926 – 22 November 2010) was a British biochemist, and Professor at the University of Newcastle upon Tyne. He was educated at High Pavement Grammar School (Nottingham), Wath Grammar School and King's College, Cambridge. When elected a Fellow of the Royal Society he was described as 'Distinguished for his contributions to knowledge of DNA structure and the mechanism of synthesis of bacteriophage nucleic acids.'

== Career ==
=== University of Sheffield, 1949–52 ===
On completing his PhD in 1949, Burton applied for an advertised Assistant Lectureship in Krebs’s Department of Biochemistry at the University of Sheffield.

Ken’s PhD research on D-amino acid oxidase led him into the study of the Neurosporacrassa L-amino acid oxidase that had recently been discovered by Bender and Krebs. He tried unsuccessfully to concentrate the activity by adsorption on alumina or calcium phosphate and, because the activity was rugged and resistant to copper ions, he tried adding cupric sulphate plus enough alkali to make cupric hydroxide. The enzyme was adsorbed on the precipitate, and Ken showed that it had a firmly bound FAD prosthetic group.

=== University of Chicago, 1952–54 ===
In September 1952 Kenneth Burton sailed on the Queen Mary to New York. From there he travelled to the University of Chicago to join a group which included Frank W. Putnam and Lloyd M. Kozloff. It soon became clear that "at that time, all that was known was that phages grew, but nobody knew how; Ken decided to investigate the effect of preventing protein synthesis on the growth of the phages. Using amino acid auxotrophs of the E. coli host, he discovered the need for phage-directed protein synthesis immediately after infection of the host cells by the phage particles preceding the synthesis of phage DNA (identified by its 5-hydroxymethylcytosine content). This discovery proved to be of great significance in virology."

=== University of Oxford, 1954–66 ===
In September 1954 Burton sailed on the Queen Elizabeth to Southampton. In Oxford, he accepted Krebs's offer of a position in the MRC Cell Metabolism Research Unit.

Ken’s 1955 paper, in which he showed that viral DNA synthesis (in bacteria) required viral proteins to be synthesized first proved to be important. This is a very fundamental point in understanding viruses and antiviral medicines. Virus reproduction requires viral proteins.

Another, perhaps even more important paper appeared in 1957. "It was an appendix to a massive paper by Krebs and Kornberg, in which he calculated and listed the free energies of formation of all of the compounds of energy metabolism, from the sugar we eat to the CO_{2} we breathe out, and most things in between ... It allows us to understand why things happen, everything from the contraction of muscle to the synthesis of protein".

=== University of Newcastle upon Tyne, 1966–89 ===
In 1966 Burton became the first Professor of Biochemistry at the University of Newcastle. There he studied nucleic acid base pools and base transport into bacteria. His new Department was opened by Krebs.

== External activities ==
Burton served at the national level on several scientific and editorial committees:

- Editorial Board, Biochemical Journal (1959–64)
- Biological Research Board, MRC (1967–71)
- Chairman of Grants Committee 1, MRC Biological Research Board (1969–71)
- Joint MRC/CRC Committee on Support of Cancer Research (1970–72)
- Science Research Council Research Group 2 (grant committee) of Biological Sciences Committee (1974–77)
- Science Research Council Representative on MRC Subcommittee of Molecular Biology (1975–76)
- Biochemical Society Committee (1975–78)
- British National Committee for Biochemistry (1978–82)
- EMBL Users’ Committee (1979–81)
- Associate Editor, Royal Society (1979–82)

== Personal life ==
Ken married Hilda Marsden on 3 September 1955 at Heeley Church, Sheffield. Their son, Andrew James, was born in 1957 at home in Kidlington. Angela Mary was born a year later, also in Kidlington.

Ken was left seriously incapacitated by a severe stroke and took early retirement in 1989. In time, he taught himself to walk again using a self-propelled cylinder mower, and largely recovered his mobility and speech. Kenneth Burton died of cancer in Alfriston. He was survived by his wife and two children.
