= Kenneth Steer =

Kenneth Steer CBE
- Born: Kenneth Arthur Steer; 12 November 1913; Rotherham, Yorkshire, England
- Died: 20 February 2007 (aged 93)
- Education: Wath Grammar School
- Alma mater: Durham University
- Occupation: Archaeologist
- Employer: Royal Commission on the Ancient and Historical Monuments of Scotland (RCAHMS)
- Title: Secretary of the RCAHMS
- Term: 1957 to 1978
- Predecessor: Angus Graham
- Successor: John Dunbar
- Military career
- Allegiance: United Kingdom
- Branch: British Army
- Service years: 1941–1946
- Rank: Captain
- Conflicts: World War II: Italian Campaign; North West Europe Campaign
- Awards: Mentioned in dispatches

Kenneth Arthur Steer, CBE, FSA, FSA Scot (12 November 1913 – 20 February 2007) was a British archaeologist and British Army officer. During World War II, he saw active service in Italy and later served as a Monuments Man in Germany. From 1957 to 1978, he served as Secretary of the Royal Commission on the Ancient and Historical Monuments of Scotland.

== Early life ==
Steer was born on 12 November 1913 in Rotherham, Yorkshire, England. He was educated at Wath Grammar School, a selective state school in Wath-upon-Dearne. He went on to study history at Durham University, where he was the president of the Durham Colleges Historical Society in the Epiphany term of 1934. He graduated Bachelor of Arts (BA) in 1935. He stayed at Durham to undertake post-graduate study concerning the archaeology of Roman County Durham. He was awarded a Doctor of Philosophy (PhD) degree in 1938. Excavations as a student included the Roman villa in Rudston, and Hadrian's Wall under Eric Birley and Ian Richmond.

== Career ==
=== Early career ===
In 1938, having completed his university education, Steer was appointed to the Royal Commission on the Ancient and Historical Monuments of Scotland as an assistant archaeologist. Within the commission, he initially worked as an investigator looking at ancient monuments in Scotland. He mainly worked in Roxburghshire and the Southern Uplands.

In the early part of World War II, he worked as a civil servant with the Scottish Office at St Andrew's House.

=== Military service ===
Steer was called up for military service in 1941 and joined the Royal Artillery as a trooper. On 31 March 1943, he was commissioned into the Intelligence Corps as a second lieutenant. He saw active service in Italy during the Italian Campaign, and took part in the landings at Salerno and Anzio. From 1943 to 1945, he served as head of the Air Photographic Interpretation Service attached to the 56th Division. Near the end of the war he was transferred to the 5th Infantry Division.

In June 1945, when hostilities ceased, he joined the Monuments, Fine Arts, and Archives program. He was posted to the North Rhine Division which was based in Düsseldorf. His duties including directing the basic repairs of historic buildings. One example of this work is Cologne Cathedral that was saved for later restoration.

=== Later career ===
Upon returning from Europe, Steer rejoined the Royal Commission on the Ancient and Historical Monuments of Scotland. He worked on the archaeology of Roxburghshire, Selkirkshire and Stirlingshire. He used his experience of using aerial photography for military intelligence, and applied it to his civilian career, discovering many unknown sites. From 1950 to 1955, he worked on the RCAHMS survey of 'marginal lands' in Scotland that were at threat from encroaching agricultural development. In 1957, he was appointed Secretary, the Chief executive, of the RCAHMS.

He gave the Horsley Lecture of the Society of Antiquaries of Newcastle upon Tyne in 1964 and the Rhind Lecture for the Society of Antiquaries of Scotland in 1968. He served as President of the Society of Antiquaries of Scotland between 1972 and 1975.

== Honours and decorations ==
In April 1946, he was Mentioned in Dispatches 'in recognition of gallant and distinguished services in North-West Europe'. For his service during World War II, he received the following campaign medals; the 1939–1945 Star, the Italy Star, the France and Germany Star, and the War Medal 1939–1945.

In the 1978 New Year Honours, he was appointed Commander of the Order of the British Empire (CBE) in recognition of his service as Secretary of the Royal Commission on the Ancient and Historical Monuments of Scotland. He was an elected Fellow of the Society of Antiquaries of London (FSA) and of the Society of Antiquaries of Scotland (FSA Scot).
