= Paul McCue =

British military historian

Paul McCue (born 1958) is a British military historian, researcher and author.

== Life ==
Born in Wombwell, near Barnsley in the then West Riding of Yorkshire, and educated at Wath Grammar School, Yorkshire; The County Grammar School, Godalming, Surrey; and the University of Birmingham (School of International Studies).

Over 35 years in the public sector, followed by work in the private and charity sector. Retired 2018 as managing director of London-based Enable Leisure and Culture. Currently Executive Trustee of SECRET WW2, The Secret WW2 Learning Network, a UK-based educational charity www.secret-ww2.net.

== Published works ==
- Dunsfold - Surrey's Most Secret Airfield. Air Research Publications, 1992. ISBN 1-871187-12-5
- SAS Operation Bulbasket. Leo Cooper, 1996. ISBN 0-85052-489-X.
- Behind Enemy Lines with the SAS.The Story of Amédée Maingard - SOE Agent. Pen and Sword 2007. ISBN 978-1-84415-618-4.
- Wandsworth and Battersea Battalions in the Great War. Pen and Sword 2010. ISBN 978-1-84884-194-9
- Brighton's Secret Agents. Unicorn Press 2016.
