= Electoral history of William Hague =

List of elections featuring William Hague as a candidate

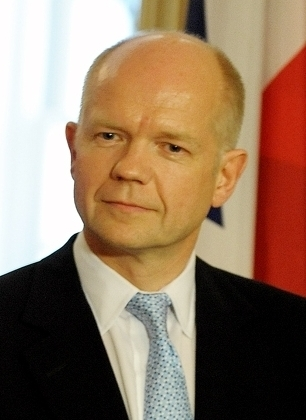

This is a summary of the electoral history of William Hague, who was leader of the Conservative Party from 19 June 1997 to 13 September 2001 and has been an MP since 1989.

== Parliamentary Elections ==
=== 1987 General Election, Wentworth ===
General Election 1987: Wentworth
Party	Candidate	Votes	%	±%
Labour	Peter Hardy	30,205	65.2	
Conservative	William Hague	10,113	21.8	
SDP	D. M. Elgin	6,031	13.0	
Majority		20,092	43.4	
Turnout			72.6	

=== By Election 1989, Richmond (Yorks) ===
Richmond by-election, 1989
Party	Candidate	Votes	%	±%
Conservative	William Hague	19,543	37.2	−24.0
SDP	Mike Potter	16,909	32.2	
SLD	Barbara Pearce	11,589	22.1	−4.9
Labour	Frank Robson	2,591	4.9	−6.9
Green	Dr. Robert Upshall	1,473	2.8	
Monster Raving Loony	David "Lord" Sutch	167	0.3	
Independent (politician)	Anthony Millns^{1}	113	0.2	
Corrective Party	Lindi St Clair	106	0.2	
Liberal	Nicholas Watkins	70	0.1	
Majority		2,634	5.0	
Turnout		52,561	64.4	
Conservative hold		Swing		

=== 1992 General Election, Richmond (Yorks) ===
General Election 1992: Richmond (Yorks)
Party	Candidate	Votes	%	±%
Conservative	William Hague	40,202	61.86	
Liberal Democrats	G. Irwin	16,698	25.69	
Labour	R. Cranston	7,523	11.58	
Independent	M. Barr	570	0.88	
Majority		23,504	36.16	
Turnout			78.42	
Conservative hold		Swing		

=== 1997 General Election, Richmond (Yorks) ===
General Election 1997: Richmond (Yorks)
Party	Candidate	Votes	%	±%
Conservative	William Hague	23,326	48.86	−13.00
Labour Co-op	Steven Merritt	13,275	27.81	+16.23
Liberal Democrats	Jane Harvey	8,773	18.38	−7.31
Referendum	Alex Bentley	2,367	4.96	N/A
Majority		10,051	21.05	−15.11
Turnout		47,741	73.38	−5.04
Conservative hold		Swing	-13.90	

=== 2001 General Election, Richmond (Yorks) ===
General Election 2001: Richmond (Yorks)
Party	Candidate	Votes	%	±%
Conservative	William Hague	25,951	58.9	+10.1
Labour Co-op	Fay Tinnion	9,632	21.9	−5.9
Liberal Democrats	Edward Forth	7,890	17.9	−0.5
Monster Raving Loony	Boney Maronie Steniforth	561	1.3	N/A
Majority		16,319	37.0	
Turnout		44,034	67.4	−6.0
Conservative hold		Swing		

=== 2005 General Election, Richmond (Yorks) ===
General Election 2005: Richmond (Yorks)
Party	Candidate	Votes	%	±%
Conservative	William Hague	26,722	59.1	+0.2
Labour	Neil Foster	8,915	19.7	−2.2
Liberal Democrats	Jacquie Bell	7,982	17.7	−0.2
Green	Leslie Rowe	1,581	3.5	N/A
Majority		17,807	39.4	
Turnout		45,200	65.0	−2.5
Conservative hold		Swing		

=== 2010 General Election, Richmond (Yorks) ===
General Election 2010: Richmond (Yorks)
Party	Candidate	Votes	%	±%
Conservative	William Hague *	33,541	62.8	+3.5
Liberal Democrats	Lawrence Meredith	10,205	19.1	+2.2
Labour	Eileen Driver	8,150	15.3	−5.3
Green	Leslie Rowe	1,516	2.8	−0.3
Majority		23,336	43.7	
Turnout		53,412	67.2	+2.6
Conservative hold		Swing		

== 1997 Conservative Party leadership election ==
First Ballot: 4 May 1997
Candidate	Votes	%
Kenneth Clarke	49	29.9
William Hague	41	25.0
John Redwood	27	16.5
Peter Lilley	24	14.6
Michael Howard	23	14.0
Turnout	164	100
Michael Howard eliminated.

Second Ballot: 5 May 1997
Candidate	Votes	%
Kenneth Clarke	64	39.0
William Hague	62	37.8
John Redwood	38	23.2
Turnout	164	100
John Redwood eliminated

Second Ballot: 6 May 1997
Candidate	Votes	%
William Hague	90	55.2
Kenneth Clarke	72	44.2
Abstentions	1	0.6
Turnout	163	99.4
Kenneth Clarke eliminated, William Hague elected

== United Kingdom general election, 2001 ==
UK General Election 2001
Party	Candidates						Votes		
Party	Stood	Elected	Gained	Unseated	Net	% of total	%	No.	Net %
Labour	640	413	2	8	−6	62.5	40.7	10,724,953	−2.5%
Conservative	643	166	9	8	+1	25.2	31.7	8,357,615	+1.0%
Liberal Democrats	639	52	8	2	+6	7.9	18.3	4,814,321	+1.5%
SNP	72	5	0	1	−1	0.8	1.8	464,314	−0.2%
UKIP	428	0	0	0	0	0.0	1.5	390,563	1.2%
UUP	17	6	1	5	−4	0.9	0.8	216,839	0.0%
Plaid Cymru	40	4	1	1	0	0.6	0.7	195,893	+0.2%
DUP	14	5	3	0	+3	0.8	0.7	181,999	+0.4%
Sinn Féin	18	4	2	0	+2	0.6	0.7	175,933	+0.3%
SDLP	18	3	0	0	0	0.5	0.6	169,865	0.0%
Green	145	0	0	0	0	0.0	0.6	166,477	+0.3%
Independent	136	0	0	1	−1	0.0	0.4	97,070	+0.3%
Scottish Socialist	72	0	0	0	0	0.0	0.3	72,516	N/A
Socialist Alliance	98	0	0	0	0	0.0	0.2	57,553	N/A
Socialist Labour	114	0	0	0	0	0.0	0.2	57,288	0.0%
BNP	33	0	0	0	0	0.0	0.2	47,129	+0.1%
Alliance	10	0	0	0	0	0.0	0.1	28,999	−0.1%
Health Concern	1	1	1	0	+1	0.2	0.1	28,487	N/A
Liberal	13	0	0	0	0	0.0	0.1	13,685	0.0%
UK Unionist	1	0	0	1	−1	0.0	0.1	13,509	+0.1%
ProLife Alliance	37	0	0	0	0	0.0	0.0	9,453	−0.1%
Legalise Cannabis	13	0	0	0	0	0.0	0.0	8,677	N/A
People's Justice	3	0	0	0	0	0.0	0.0	7,443	N/A
Monster Raving Loony	15	0	0	0	0	0.0	0.0	6,655	0.0%
PUP	2	0	0	0	0	0.0	0.0	4,781	0.0%
Mebyon Kernow	3	0	0	0	0	0.0	0.0	3,199	0.0%
NI Women's Coalition	1	0	0	0	0	0.0	0.0	2,968	0.0%
Scottish Unionist Party (modern)	2	0	0	0	0	0.0	0.0	2,728	N/A
Rock 'n' Roll Loony	7	0	0	0	0	0.0	0.0	2,634	N/A
National Front	5	0	0	0	0	0.0	0.0	2,484	0.0%
Workers' Party	6	0	0	0	0	0.0	0.0	2,352	0.0%
Neath Port Talbot Ratepayers	1	0	0	0	0	0.0	0.0	1,960	N/A
NI Unionist	6	0	0	0	0	0.0	0.0	1,794	N/A
Socialist Alternative	2	0	0	0	0	0.0	0.0	1,454	0.0%
Reform 2000	5	0	0	0	0	0.0	0.0	1,418	N/A
Isle of Wight	1	0	0	0	0	0.0	0.0	1,164	N/A
Muslim	4	0	0	0	0	0.0	0.0	1,150	N/A
Communist	6	0	0	0	0	0.0	0.0	1,003	0.0%
New Britain	1	0	0	0	0	0.0	0.0	888	0.0%
Free Party	3	0	0	0	0	0.0	0.0	832	N/A
Leeds Left Alliance	1	0	0	0	0	0.0	0.0	770	N/A
New Millennium Bean Party	1	0	0	0	0	0.0	0.0	727	N/A
Workers Revolutionary	6	0	0	0	0	0.0	0.0	607	0.0%
Tatton	1	0	0	0	0	0.0	0.0	505	N/A

Government's new majority	167
Total votes cast	26,368,204
Turnout	59.4%

All parties with more than 500 votes shown.
