= Wath (Park Road) Secondary Modern School =

Location
- Park Road; Wath-upon-Dearne; West Riding of Yorkshire; United Kingdom

Information
- Type: County school
- Closed: December 1963
- Local authority: West Riding County Council
- Gender: Mixed
- Age: 11 to 16
- Houses: Red, Green, Blue, Yellow
- Publication: The Roadster

Wath (Park Road) Secondary Modern School was a secondary modern school in Wath-upon-Dearne, then in the West Riding of Yorkshire in the United Kingdom. It closed in December 1963, with the neighbouring Wath Grammar School expanding to replace it.

- Notable Teachers
- Colin Fidler - Head of Mathematics
- Betty Corbridge - Senior Mistress

== History ==
The school was called Wath Park Road Council School in the 1930s.

The school merged into Wath Grammar School in January 1964. Park Road's old building become Wath's second site. Initially, it continued to be used as the basic wing of the school for former secondary modern students. It was then used as Wath's first form (later Year 7) wing until it was demolished in 2005.
