= Van der Wath =

Van der Wath is a South African surname. It may mean from the Watt, in reference to the Wadden Sea in the Netherlands.

Notable people with this surname include:

- Craig Van der Wath (born 1966), South African squash player
- Johan van der Wath (born 1978), South African cricketer
