= Wath Academy =

Location
- Sandygate; South Yorkshire, S63 7NW; England; 53.4967°N 1.3419°W

Information
- Former names: Wath Secondary School (1923–1931); Wath Grammar School (1931–1974); Wath Comprehensive School (1974–2001); Wath Comprehensive School: A Language College (2001–2019)
- Type: Academy
- Motto: Latin: Meliora Spectare (Look to Better Things)
- Opened: 17 September 1923
- Local authority: Rotherham
- Trust: Maltby Learning Trust
- Specialist: Languages
- Department for Education URN: 145848 Tables
- Ofsted: Reports
- Chair of governors: Nicola Parr
- Principal: Andrew Hopkin
- Gender: Mixed
- Age range: 11–18
- Enrolment: 2,104 (July 2026)
- Capacity: 1,800
- Sixth form students: 400
- Hours in school day: 5
- Houses: Athens, Carthage, Rome, Sparta, Thebes and Troy
- Colours: Maroon and gold
- Slogan: Delivering exceptional learning experiences that enable all young people to thrive in a competitive world and lead successful and fulfilling lives
- Publication: Torch
- Alumni: Old Wathonians
- Website: wathacademy.com
- Wath Academy Sixth Form logo

Wath Academy is a mixed secondary school on Sandygate in Wath-upon-Dearne in the Metropolitan Borough of Rotherham, South Yorkshire, England.

== Admissions ==
The school is a specialist Language College, though it is non-selective. It has approximately 2,000 pupils between the ages of 11 and 18 on roll, including around 400 in the sixth form.

There is also a school council, which contributes to the decisions made by the head and speaks on behalf of all the students in all years. The school is within the Maltby learning trust.

== History ==
The school was founded in 1923 as Wath Secondary School. Initially, the school was situated on Park Road, sharing the building of Park Road Infants School. The school was controlled by West Riding County Council.

Wath Secondary School rapidly outgrew its original accommodation, which led to lessons taking place in a number of borrowed locations scattered throughout Wath-upon-Dearne. To rectify this, the school moved into new, purpose-built accommodation on Sandygate in 1930. The institution became known as Wath Grammar School in 1931. The school was expanded with many new buildings and extensions in the early 1950s.

In January 1964 the school absorbed the neighbouring Wath (Park Road) Secondary Modern School. The expanded school initially still divided students into 'grammar' and 'basic' (secondary modern) streams and it was some time before it was formally designated a comprehensive school in 1972 and renamed Wath Comprehensive School in 1974 (which coincided with the school coming under the control of Rotherham Metropolitan Borough Council). The Park Road site initially continued to be used for the secondary modern stream, but later became a wing for first form (later known as Year 7) students. Due to further expansion, the school also occupied a corner of Wath Central Junior School site on Festival Road for a period, making a total of three sites.

On 31 December 1998, two students of the school, aged 14 and 15, died in a meningitis outbreak. Other students at the school were given antibiotics as a precaution. This was followed by an immunisation programme for all 1,700 students, which delayed the school reopening for lessons after the Christmas holiday by two days. The school itself was not thought to be the source of the outbreak.

The school was awarded language college status in 2001 and appended this to its name to become Wath Comprehensive School: A Language College.

Over time, the school's buildings, on all three sites, aged badly. In its 1997 report on the school, Ofsted described the accommodation as 'quite appalling', 'debilitating' and 'some of the worst working conditions the inspection team has seen'. The Inspectors highlighted 'damp seeping through the walls and ceilings', 'decaying door and window fittings', 'areas of crumbling asphalt and potholes' and 'falling plaster', before going on to conclude:

Floors are bowing and lifting in the IT rooms. In the sixth form common room, which is insufficient for the number of students, roof slates are missing, causing ceilings to collapse during wet weather. The roof also leaks in the girls' changing rooms, where pupils often have to move clothing to keep it from getting wet. Changing accommodation overall is insufficient. Many paths and steps are in a dangerous state of repair. No pupils should be expected to endure such conditions.

— Ofsted, Inspection Report: Wath Comprehensive School (November 1997)

The school was rebuilt from 2003 to 2005, under the Private Finance Initiative (PFI) initiative. A new building on Sandygate, opened after Easter 2005, now makes up the majority of the school accommodation. Some parts of the school dating back from the 1950s (such as the hall and sports hall) survive, though none of the older 1930s buildings were retained. The loss of the oldest buildings was not without controversy, particularly the traditional 1930s part of the school which was set around two quadrangles. The Park Road site was demolished completely (along with the neighbouring Wath Park Infant School – a direct descendant of Park Road Infant School, where the secondary school was first based – which closed and merged with Wath Central Junior School to form Wath Central Primary School) and was replaced by housing. As a result of the rebuild, the school became single-site for the first time since the 1960s (though a road divides the main site from some of the playing fields). In 2008, the rebuilding was fully completed with the addition of a public leisure centre, including a swimming pool. The old caretaker's house on the school grounds is now used as the isolation block.

The school transitioned from being a community school to a foundation school, within the newly-formed Wath Learning Community Co-operative Trust, on 1 September 2013.

Less than a decade after it was built, the school had already outgrown its new building. The school has an official capacity of 1,740 students, but numbers have grown to over 1,900. Plans were drawn up for a 12 classroom overspill building, but the school has twice been denied the funds for construction. In 2014, Rotherham Metropolitan Borough Council chose not to fund the building because a third of Wath's students do not live within the local authority's boundaries, meaning the building would not, in the council's eyes, benefit the people of Rotherham enough. The funding therefore went to a similar building at Wickersley School and Sports College, which was not as overcapacity as Wath, but does draw all its students from the borough of Rotherham. In 2015, the school secured funding from the Department for Education for the building, but this was withdrawn as part of cuts in 2016. Later in 2016, the local council proposed an extension of five classrooms, in return for the school taking on 20 additional students a year. After many delays, construction of this extension began in July 2018 and was completed in February 2019.

Following the controversial Ofsted inspection in March 2017, the school was forced to academise (and leave its current foundation trust) against its will. The regional schools commissioner proposed Maltby Learning Trust as the academy sponsor in July 2017. Originally, the school was due to become an academy on 1 April 2018. After being delayed 12 times, the school finally academised – a full year late – on 1 April 2019 and became known as Wath Academy. It immediately became the largest and highest performing school in Maltby Learning Trust.

On 17 September 2023, the school celebrated its 100th anniversary with an open day and the publication of a centenary book entitled Meliora Spectare: 100 Years of Wath Academy.

== School periodicals ==
Wath Academy's school magazine, Torch, has been published in its present form since September 2022. Previous publications include The Wath Magazine (c.1923–1930), The Wathonian (1930–c.1977 and 1991), The New Wathonian (1984–1985), The Wath Chronicle (1992–2001), Connexions (1996–2010), In Touch (mid-2000s–2014) and The Torch (2014–2022). The school also publishes a weekly newsletter during term time.

== School size ==
The school opened with 77 students in 1923, though had 520 students by 1929 (making it the fourth largest school in the West Riding local education authority area). Numbers then grew gradually, though were boosted to around 1,500 in the 1960s due to the closing of Wath (Park Road) Secondary Modern School. The school expanded again from the late 1970s, particularly boosted by the closure of the nearby Brampton Ellis Comprehensive School in 1985, and eventually reached 1,750 students. Numbers were at this level until as recently as 2007. However, further rises in student numbers (partially the sixth form, which has swelled from 300 to 400 students) have taken the total number of students to over 1,900: 300 students in each of Years 7 to 11 (rising to 320 from the 2018 intake and 330 from the 2019 intake onwards), with 200 in each year of the sixth form. As of 2013, the school is the 24th largest in England.

== Academic performance ==
The school's results, whether measuring progress or raw attainment, are all above national averages.

In 2017, the school's Progress 8 score, which measures the progress made by students between the end of Key Stage 2 and Key Stage 4 (GCSE), was +0.07 (above the national average of −0.03, putting the school in the top third of the country). Its Attainment 8 score, which converts GCSE and other qualification grades into points, was 47.1 (above the national average of 44.6). The percentage of students achieving GCSE grades 9–5 in English and Maths was 41% (above the national average of 39.6%). The percentage of students achieving the English Baccalaureate was 35% (well above the national average of 19.7%), with entries for the EBacc being 70% (double the national average of 35%).

The sixth form results for 2017 showed an A Level/academic progress rate of +0.20 (in the top 10% of the country). The progress of vocational students was +0.77 (also in the top 10% of the country). The progress rates for students resitting GCSEs were +1.00 grades for English (in the top 3% of the country) and +0.88 grades for Maths (in the top 5% of the country).

== Ofsted inspections ==
Since the commencement of Ofsted inspections in September 1993, the school has undergone seven full inspections. This includes the highly controversial inspection of 2017, where the school's results – officially classed as 'average' by the Department for Education – were inexplicably called 'dire' by Ofsted. As Wath Academy is legally a new institution, it received its first inspection in 2023.

Date of inspection	Outcome	Reference
14–?? February 1994	???	
3–7 November 1997	Good	Report
10–14 February 2003	Good	Report
14–15 February 2006	Good	Report
5–6 October 2011	Good	Report
15–16 March 2017	Inadequate (special measures)	Report
3–4 July 2023	Good	Report

== Headteachers/principals ==
- Rev. Arthur Grear, September 1923 – August 1940 (left to be an Air Force chaplain)
- John Ritchie, September 1940 – May 1954 (died in office)
- Sylvia Swift, May 1954 – April 1955 (acting headmistress)
- Dr Clifford Saffell, April 1955 – August 1972
- Roger Murphy, September 1972 – April 1977
- Elsa Clegg, April 1977 – August 1977 (acting headmistress)
- John Brothwell, September 1977 – February 1991 (died in office)
- Derek Kirby, February 1991 – August 1997 (acting until end of June 1991)
- Robert Godber, September 1997 – August 2002
- Eric Sampson, September 2002 – May 2003 (died in office)
- Jim Chisholm, May 2003 – December 2003 (acting headteacher)
- Patricia Ward, January 2004 – August 2016
- Jon Taylor, September 2016 – August 2020 (role name changed from 'headteacher' to 'principal' in September 2019)
- Liam Ransome, September 2020–May 2026
- Andrew Hopkin, June 2026–present

== Notable former pupils ==
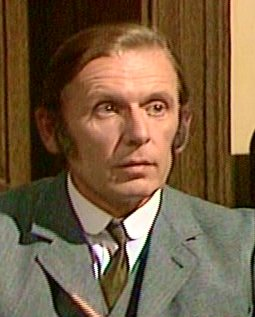
Alan Dobie, actor

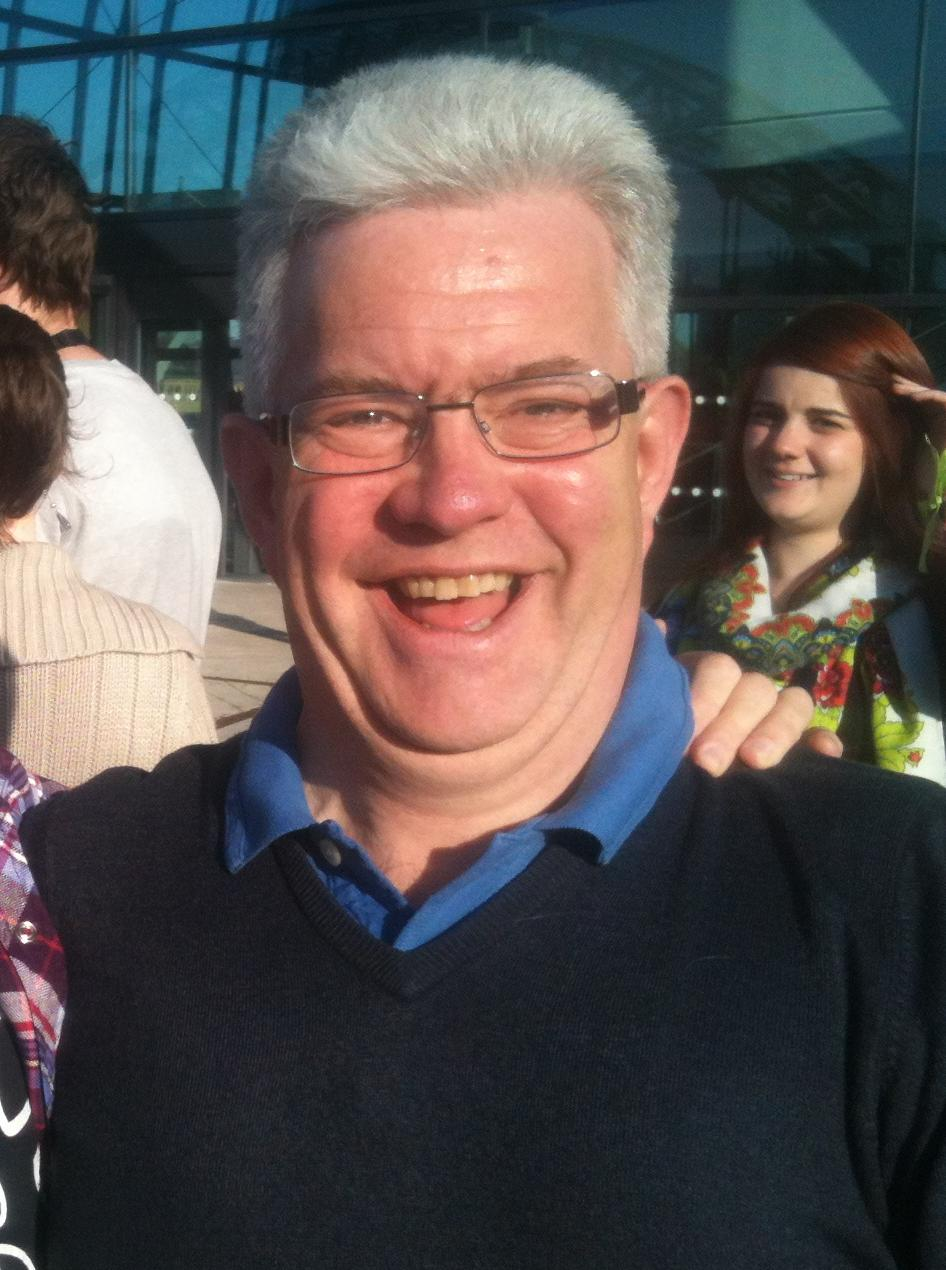
Ian McMillan, the Bard of Barnsley

- Ollie Banks, footballer
- David Bret, biographer
- Kenneth Burton (1939–1943), biochemist
- Brandon Crook (2004–2011), drummer in The Sherlocks
- Kiaran Crook (2007–2014), singer and guitarist in The Sherlocks
- Sir Charles Curran (1933–1940), former director-general of the BBC
- Rob Dawber (1967–1974), screenwriter
- Alan Dobie (1941–1948), actor
- Toby Foster, radio presenter and comedian
- John Goldthorpe (1946–1953), sociologist
- Bryan Gray (1964–1971), former chairman of the Northwest Regional Development Agency
- William Hague, Baron Hague of Richmond (1973–1979), former leader of the Conservative Party and Foreign Secretary
- Peter Hardy, Baron Hardy of Wath (1942–1949), politician
- Jonathan Holmes, theatre director
- Kingsley James, footballer
- Brian Key (1958–1965), politician
- Alec Lazenby (1938–1945), agronomist
- Paul McCue (1969–1970), military historian
- Ian McMillan (1967–1975), poet and radio presenter
- Kenneth Steer (1925–1932), archaeologist
- Josh Wale (1999–2004), boxer
- George Unwin (1913–2006), fighter pilot during the Second World War
- Johnny Wardle (1934–1938), cricketer

== Notable former staff ==
- Peter Cullen, javelinist
