= Wath railway station =

Wath railway station may refer to a number of railway stations in Yorkshire, England:

serving Wath-upon-Dearne, now in South Yorkshire

- Wath (Hull and Barnsley) railway station, open from 1902 to 1929
- Wath Central railway station, closed in 1959
- Wath North railway station, opened as Wath railway station in 1841, closed in 1968

serving Wath-in-Nidderdale, now in North Yorkshire

- Wath-in-Nidderdale railway station on the Nidd Valley Light Railway, open from 1907 to 1929

== See also ==
- Wath marshalling yard, an assembly point for coal trains near Wath-upon-Dearne, open from 1907 to 1988
