= Rotherham Metropolitan Borough Council elections =

Local government elections in South Yorkshire, England

Rotherham Metropolitan Borough Council is the local authority for Rotherham in South Yorkshire, England. The council is elected every four years. Since the last boundary changes in 2004, 63 councillors have been elected from 21 wards.

As part of the government's response to the Rotherham sexual abuses scandal, the Secretary of State for Communities and Local Government, Eric Pickles made an order under the Local Government Act 2000 to switch Rotherham council to holding all-out elections in 2016 and then every fourth year after (the boundaries were not changed). Until then, Rotherham was elected 'in thirds' like other Metropolitan Boroughs, with a third of the council being elected in 3 years out of every 4-year cycle.

== Council elections ==
- 1998 Rotherham Metropolitan Borough Council election
- 1999 Rotherham Metropolitan Borough Council election
- 2000 Rotherham Metropolitan Borough Council election
- 2002 Rotherham Metropolitan Borough Council election
- 2003 Rotherham Metropolitan Borough Council election
- 2004 Rotherham Metropolitan Borough Council election (whole council elected after boundary changes)
- 2006 Rotherham Metropolitan Borough Council election
- 2007 Rotherham Metropolitan Borough Council election
- 2008 Rotherham Metropolitan Borough Council election
- 2010 Rotherham Metropolitan Borough Council election
- 2011 Rotherham Metropolitan Borough Council election
- 2012 Rotherham Metropolitan Borough Council election
- 2014 Rotherham Metropolitan Borough Council election
- 2015 Rotherham Metropolitan Borough Council election
- 2016 Rotherham Metropolitan Borough Council election (whole council elected due to change in electoral system)
- 2021 Rotherham Metropolitan Borough Council election (new ward boundaries)
- 2024 Rotherham Metropolitan Borough Council election

== Results maps ==
2004 results map

2006 results map

2007 results map

2008 results map

2010 results map

2011 results map

2012 results map

2014 results map

2015 results map

2016 results map

2021 results map

2024 results map

== By-election results ==
=== 1994-1998 ===
Herringthorpe By-Election 20 March 1997
Party	Candidate	Votes	%	±%
Labour		1,015	90.7	
Conservative		104	9.3	
Majority		911	81.4	
Turnout		1,019		
Labour hold		Swing		

Aston, Orgreave & Ulley By-Election 31 July 1997
Party	Candidate	Votes	%	±%
Labour		894	70.8	−12.7
Independent		213	16.9	+16.9
Conservative		155	12.3	+12.3
Majority		681	53.9	
Turnout		1,262	10.8	
Labour hold		Swing		

=== 1998-2002 ===
Brampton, Melton and Wentworth By-Election 10 September 1998
Party	Candidate	Votes	%	±%
Labour		818	77.8	
Conservative		233	22.2	
Majority		585	55.6	
Turnout		1,051		
Labour hold		Swing		

Greasbrough By-Election 2 December 1999
Party	Candidate	Votes	%	±%
Labour		774	81.7	+13.9
Liberal Democrats		94	9.9	−7.9
Conservative		67	7.1	−4.7
Independent		12	1.3	−1.2
Majority		680	71.8	
Turnout		947	13.5	
Labour hold		Swing		

Aston, Orgreave & Ulley By-Election 21 September 2000
Party	Candidate	Votes	%	±%
Labour		759	48.0	−8.7
Conservative		349	22.1	+1.5
Liberal Democrats		331	20.9	+6.0
Socialist		107	6.8	−1.0
Democrat Party		35	2.2	+2.2
Majority		410	25.9	
Turnout		1,581		
Labour hold		Swing		

Thurcroft and Whiston By-Election 4 April 2002
Party	Candidate	Votes	%	±%
Labour	Daniel Evans	323	32.8	−11.3
Liberal Democrats		272	27.6	+7.1
Conservative		196	19.9	+7.6
Independent		193	19.6	+19.6
Majority		51	5.2	
Turnout		984	24.0	
Labour gain from Independent		Swing		

=== 2002-2006 ===
Thurcroft and Whiston By-Election 18 July 2002
Party	Candidate	Votes	%	±%
Labour		554	44.5	−8.1
Liberal Democrats		538	43.2	+11.9
Conservative		102	8.2	−7.9
Independent		51	4.1	+4.1
Majority		16	1.3	
Turnout		1,245	15.7	
Labour hold		Swing		

Herringthorpe By-Election 27 November 2003
Party	Candidate	Votes	%	±%
Labour		575	64.0	−6.1
Liberal Democrats		100	11.1	+1.7
Conservative		89	9.9	−1.2
Independent		78	8.7	+8.7
Green		57	6.3	−3.1
Majority		475	52.9	
Turnout		899	14.8	
Labour hold		Swing		

=== 2006-2010 ===
Rotherham West By-Election 26 October 2006
Party	Candidate	Votes	%	±%
Labour	John Foden	1,024	44.3	+3.8
BNP	Marlene Guest	606	26.2	+26.2
Independent	Caven Vines	538	23.2	−15.0
Conservative	Christopher Middleton	146	6.3	+6.3
Majority		418	18.1	
Turnout		2,314	26.3	
Labour hold		Swing		

Valley By-Election 12 July 2007
Party	Candidate	Votes	%	±%
Labour	Simon Currie	781	43.8	−1.5
BNP	Carol Myers	348	19.5	+2.0
Independent	James Wilson	308	17.3	+17.3
Conservative	Connor Swift	197	11.0	−10.4
Liberal Democrats	Eric Shaw	150	8.4	−7.4
Majority		433	24.3	
Turnout		1,784	19.5	
Labour hold		Swing		

Wickersley By-Election 28 August 2008
Party	Candidate	Votes	%	±%
Labour	Chris McMahon	871	31.1	−4.8
Conservative	Donald Ross	824	29.5	−9.4
BNP	Jon Round	538	19.2	+19.2
UKIP	Tina Dowdall	373	13.3	−11.9
Liberal Democrats	Steven Scutt	191	6.8	+6.8
Majority		47	1.6	
Turnout		2,797	30.0	
Labour hold		Swing		

=== 2010-2014 ===
Rawmarsh By-Election 16 May 2013
Party	Candidate	Votes	%	±%
UKIP	Caven Vines	1,143	46.5	
Labour	Lisa Marie Wright	1,039	42.3	
Conservative	Martyn Lawton Parker	107	4.4	
BNP	William George Baldwin	80	3.3	
TUSC	Andrew Tony Gray	61	2.5	
Liberal Democrats	Mohammed Meharban	28	1.1	
Majority		104	4.2	
Turnout		2,458	25.7	
UKIP gain from Labour		Swing		

=== 2016-2021 ===
Dinnington by-election 2 February 2017
Party	Candidate	Votes	%	±%
Labour	John Vjestica	670	36.1	▼3.9
UKIP	Lee Hunter	303	16.3	▼14.1
Conservative	Christopher Middleton	238	12.8	▲12.8
Independent	David Smith	232	12.5	▼12.8
Independent	Jean Hart	180	9.7	▲9.7
Independent	Scott Steven	81	4.4	▲4.4
Green	Charles Foulstone	78	4.2	▼7.9
Liberal Democrats	Stephen Thornley	75	4.0	▲4.0
Majority		367	19.8	
Turnout		1,857		
Labour gain from UKIP		Swing		

Brinsworth and Catcliffe by-election 2 February 2017
Party	Candidate	Votes	%	±%
Liberal Democrats	Adam Carter	2,000	66.0	▲50.4
Labour	Shabana Ahmed	519	17.1	▼26.2
UKIP	Steven Webster	389	12.8	▼16.4
Conservative	John Oliver	91	3.0	▲3.0
Green	Rebecca Whyman	30	1.0	▲1.0
Majority		1,481	48.9	
Turnout		3,029		
Liberal Democrats gain from Labour		Swing		

The 50% vote increase for the Liberal Democrats marked the highest ever swing in their favour since the creation of the council.

=== 2021-2024 ===
Anston and Woodsetts by-election 9 December 2021
Party	Candidate	Votes	%	±%
Liberal Democrats	Drew Simon Tarmey	1,016	38.6	+11.1
Conservative	Adrian John Knight	686	26.1	−1.8
Labour	Simon Andrew Tweed	533	20.3	−0.1
Independent	Clive Robert Jepson	189	7.2	−13.0
Independent	Jonathan Charles Ireland	118	4.5	−10.2
Green	Charles David Dowsing Foulstone	63	2.4	−7.9
Yorkshire	Christopher Michael Whitwood	20	0.8	New
Rotherham Democratic Party	Allen Cowles	6	0.2	New
Majority		330	12.5	N/A
Turnout		2,634	28.02	−10.41
Liberal Democrats gain from Conservative		Swing		

Aughton and Swallownest by-election 9 December 2021
Party	Candidate	Votes	%	±%
Labour	Robert Paul Taylor	645	50.8	+22.8
Conservative	Julia Helen Mitchell	496	39.1	+2.0
Green	Louisa Kathryn Barker	59	4.6	New
Yorkshire	Jack Bannan	35	2.8	New
TUSC	Paul Marshall	32	2.5	New
Rotherham Democratic Party	Gavin Peter Shawcroft	15	1.2	−17.8
Liberal Democrats	Mark Lambert	14	1.1	−4.9
Majority		149	11.7	N/A
Turnout		1,299	19.94	−7.22
Labour gain from Conservative		Swing		

Keppel by-election 27 January 2023
Party	Candidate	Votes	%	±%
Labour	Carole Ann Foster	745	36.1	+10.8
Liberal Democrats	Khoulod Ghanem	445	21.6	+12.7
Independent	Sid Currie	381	18.5	New
Yorkshire	Peter Robert Key	314	15.2	+0.2
Conservative	Mohammed Osman Suleman	119	5.8	−25.0
Green	Paul Neville Martin	59	2.9	New
Majority				
Turnout		2,067	19.94	−8.44
Labour gain from Rotherham Democratic Party		Swing		

Dinnington by-election 13 July 2023
Party	Candidate	Votes	%	±%
Conservative	Julz Hall	1,064	42.7	+6.5
Labour	John Vjestica	820	32.9	+7.4
Liberal Democrats	Matt Mears	262	10.5	+1.4
Independent	Dave Smith	196	7.9	−11.3
Reform	Tony Harrison	61	2.4	+2.4
Green	Paul Martin	59	2.4	−7.7
Yorkshire	Peter Key	28	1.1	+1.1
Majority		244	9.8	
Turnout		2,490		
Conservative hold		Swing		

Kilnhurst and Swinton East by-election 2 November 2023
Party	Candidate	Votes	%	±%
Labour	Nigel Harper	810	64.6	+7.1
Conservative	Patricia Collins	293	23.4	−7.3
Reform	Adam Wood	58	4.6	+4.6
Yorkshire	Peter Key	38	3.0	+3.0
Liberal Democrats	John Gelder	30	2.4	−4.1
Green	Paul Martin	25	2.0	+2.0
Majority		517	41.2	
Turnout		1,254		
Labour hold		Swing		

=== 2024-2028 ===
Keppel by-election 10 July 2025
Party	Candidate	Votes	%	±%
Reform	Tony Harrison	1,160	40.3	+40.3
Independent	Neil Collett	801	27.8	−1.9
Labour	Kieran Bold	558	19.4	−13.3
Conservative	Lewis Mills	105	3.6	−6.9
Yorkshire	Peter Key	100	3.5	−7.8
Liberal Democrats	Khoulod Ghanem	80	2.8	−1.4
Green	Tony Mabbott	77	2.7	−7.1
Majority		359	12.5	
Turnout		2,881		
Reform gain from Labour		Swing		

Anston and Woodsetts by-election 19 November 2026
Party	Candidate	Votes	%	±%
Conservative	Mike Hemingway	825	26.2	−9.0
Reform	Andy Damms	780	24.8	+24.8
Liberal Democrats	Bev Thornley	660	21.0	−11.6
Labour	Ashley Gregory	578	18.4	−1.4
Restore	Paul Vernon	239	7.6	+7.6
Green	Annie Blench	64	2.0	+2.0
Majority		45	1.4	
Turnout		3,146		
Conservative hold		Swing		
