= 2008 Rotherham Metropolitan Borough Council election =

2008 English local government election

Map of the 2008 Rotherham Metropolitan Borough Council election

The 2008 Rotherham Metropolitan Borough Council election took place on 1 May 2008 to elect a third of the members of Rotherham Metropolitan Borough Council, the council of Rotherham in England. This was on the same day as the other 2008 United Kingdom local elections. In the election, the council stayed under Labour control.

The previous council election took place in 2007 and the following election was held in 2010.

== Results ==
| Party | Previous | Seats +/- | 2008 |
|---|---|---|---|
| Labour | 54 | ▼4 | 50 |
| Conservative | 7 | ▲3 | 10 |
| British National Party | 0 | ▲2 | 2 |
| Others | 2 | ▼1 | 1 |

== See also ==
- Rotherham Metropolitan Borough Council elections
