= 2006 Rotherham Metropolitan Borough Council election =

2006 UK local government election

← 2004	4 May 2006	2007 →

21 of the 63 seats on Rotherham Metropolitan Borough Council 32 seats needed for a majority
	First party	Second party
Party	Labour	Conservative
Seats won	19	2
Seats after	55	6
Seat change	▲2	▼1
Popular vote	25,762	12,483
Percentage	42.9%	20.8%
Swing	▲5.1%	▼1.6%
- A map of the 2006 Rotherham Council election. Labour in red and Conservatives in blue.
Council control before election
Labour
Council control after election
Labour

Elections to Rotherham Metropolitan Borough Council were held on 4 May 2006. The Labour party kept overall control of the council. One third of the council was up for election and no boundary changes were made.

After the election, the composition of the council was:

- Labour 55
- Conservative 6
- Others 2

== Election result ==
Rotherham local election result 2006
Party	Seats	Gains	Losses	Net gain/loss	Seats %	Votes %	Votes	+/−
Labour	19	2	0	▲2	90.5	42.9	25,762	▲5.1
Conservative	2	0	1	▼1	9.5	20.8	12,483	▼1.6
Liberal Democrats	0	0	0	Steady	0.0	23.5	14,118	▲0.6
Independent	0	0	1	▼1	0.0	8.4	5,068	▼0.9
BNP	0	0	0	Steady	0.0	2.6	1,577	▲0.6
UKIP	0	0	0	Steady	0.0	1.0	576	▼0.4
CPA	0	0	0	Steady	0.0	0.9	533	▲0.7

== Ward results ==
=== Anston and Woodsetts ===
Anston and Woodsetts
Party	Candidate	Votes	%	±%
Labour	Josephine Burton	1,300	42.1	
Conservative	Keith Hunter	1,102	35.7	
Liberal Democrats	Steven Scutt	684	22.2	
Majority		198	6.4	
Turnout			35.3	
Labour hold		Swing		

=== Boston Castle ===
Boston Castle
Party	Candidate	Votes	%	±%
Labour	Rose McNeely	1,020	31.0	
Independent	Irene Furnell	1,006	30.5	
Conservative	Christian Kramer	648	19.7	
Liberal Democrats	Patricia Shaw	621	18.8	
Majority		14	0.5	
Turnout			38.3	
Labour hold		Swing		

=== Brinsworth and Catcliffe ===
Brinsworth and Catcliffe
Party	Candidate	Votes	%	±%
Labour	Fred Wright	1,542	54.0	
Liberal Democrats	Stanley Burgess	823	28.8	
Conservative	Raymond Philips	488	17.1	
Majority		719	25.2	
Turnout			31.8	
Labour hold		Swing		

=== Dinnington ===
Dinnington
Party	Candidate	Votes	%	±%
Labour	David Davies	1,238	47.3	
Conservative	Nigel Lee	827	31.6	
Liberal Democrats	George Hardwick	555	21.2	
Majority		411	15.7	
Turnout			30.6	
Labour hold		Swing		

=== Hellaby ===
Hellaby
Party	Candidate	Votes	%	±%
Conservative	Lynda Binnie	1,229	37.7	
Labour	Timothy Bowmar	881	27.0	
UKIP	John Wilkinson	576	17.7	
Liberal Democrats	Donald Ross	575	17.6	
Majority		348	10.7	
Turnout			36.6	
Conservative hold		Swing		

=== Holderness ===
Holderness
Party	Candidate	Votes	%	±%
Labour	Gerald Smith	1,327	46.9	
Liberal Democrats	Roger Beaverstock	970	34.3	
CPA	Paul Martin	533	18.8	
Majority		357	12.6	
Turnout			31.0	
Labour hold		Swing		

=== Hoober ===
Hoober
Party	Candidate	Votes	%	±%
Labour	Richard Russell	1,208	43.2	
BNP	Christopher-John Dannatt	641	22.9	
Conservative	Jon Fleming-Smith	523	18.7	
Liberal Democrats	Ann Jones	425	15.2	
Majority		567	20.3	
Turnout			32.1	
Labour hold		Swing		

=== Keppel ===
Keppel
Party	Candidate	Votes	%	±%
Labour	Ian Barron	1,110	32.9	
BNP	Marlene Guest	936	27.7	
Liberal Democrats	Annette Kelly	882	26.1	
Conservative	Christopher Middleton	450	13.3	
Majority		174	5.2	
Turnout			36.5	
Labour hold		Swing		

=== Maltby ===
Maltby
Party	Candidate	Votes	%	±%
Labour	Amy Rushforth	1,124	41.6	
Independent	Keith Stringer	1,018	37.7	
Liberal Democrats	Eric Broadhead	558	20.7	
Majority		106	3.9	
Turnout			30.9	
Labour hold		Swing		

=== Rawmarsh ===
Rawmarsh
Party	Candidate	Votes	%	±%
Labour	Shaun Wright	1,399	54.5	
Liberal Democrats	Paul Shaw	643	25.1	
Conservative	David Tiptaft	524	20.4	
Majority		756	29.4	
Turnout			28.0	
Labour hold		Swing		

=== Rother Vale ===
Rother Vale
Party	Candidate	Votes	%	±%
Labour	Georgina Boyes	1,078	45.9	
Independent	Vera Brockbank	754	32.1	
Liberal Democrats	Gisela Bryden	518	22.0	
Majority		324	13.8	
Turnout			27.3	
Labour hold		Swing		

=== Rotherham East ===
Rotherham East
Party	Candidate	Votes	%	±%
Labour	Shaukat Ali	1,329	64.1	
Liberal Democrats	Mohd Ilyas	745	35.9	
Majority		584	28.2	
Turnout			25.0	
Labour hold		Swing		

=== Rotherham West ===
Rotherham West
Party	Candidate	Votes	%	±%
Labour	Jahangir Akhtar	1,205	40.5	
Independent	Cav Vines	1,137	38.2	
Liberal Democrats	Lee Ridsdale	634	21.3	
Majority		68	2.3	
Turnout			34.1	
Labour gain from Independent		Swing		

=== Silverwood ===
Silverwood
Party	Candidate	Votes	%	±%
Labour	Patricia Russell	1,212	44.1	
Liberal Democrats	Eric Shaw	840	30.5	
Conservative	James Gelder	698	25.4	
Majority		372	13.6	
Turnout			30.8	
Labour hold		Swing		

=== Sitwell ===
Sitwell
Party	Candidate	Votes	%	±%
Conservative	Anthony Mannion	1,714	45.3	
Liberal Democrats	Alan Bryden	1,154	30.5	
Labour	John Foden	914	24.2	
Majority		560	14.8	
Turnout			41.2	
Conservative hold		Swing		

=== Swinton ===
Swinton
Party	Candidate	Votes	%	±%
Labour	Neil License	1,547	56.0	
Liberal Democrats	Martyn Parker	662	24.0	
Conservative	Brian Taylor	554	20.1	
Majority		885	32.0	
Turnout			31.1	
Labour hold		Swing		

=== Valley ===
Valley
Party	Candidate	Votes	%	±%
Labour	Dave Pickering	1,235	45.9	
Conservative	Lucie Brittain	583	21.7	
Liberal Democrats	Paul Turner	499	18.5	
Independent	Kath Reeder	375	13.9	
Majority		652	24.2	
Turnout			30.5	
Labour hold		Swing		

=== Wales ===
Wales
Party	Candidate	Votes	%	±%
Labour	Jennifer Whysall	1,168	42.2	
Conservative	Gavin Sharp	1,045	37.8	
Liberal Democrats	Bernard Baber	555	20.1	
Majority		123	4.4	
Turnout			34.3	
Labour gain from Conservative		Swing		

=== Wath ===
Wath
Party	Candidate	Votes	%	±%
Labour	Alan Atkin	1,498	56.1	
Conservative	Jennifer Tiptaft	611	22.9	
Liberal Democrats	Daniel Gallacher	562	21.0	
Majority		887	33.2	
Turnout			30.5	
Labour hold		Swing		

=== Wickersley ===
Wickersley
Party	Candidate	Votes	%	±%
Labour	Beryl Billington	1,227	38.7	
Conservative	Gabrielle Colley	1,172	36.9	
Liberal Democrats	Peter Ward	773	24.4	
Majority		55	1.8	
Turnout			34.3	
Labour hold		Swing		

=== Wingfield ===
Wingfield
Party	Candidate	Votes	%	±%
Labour	Keith Goulty	1,200	43.9	
Independent	David Newey	445	16.3	
Liberal Democrats	John Beaumont	440	16.1	
Independent	Harry Gresser	333	12.2	
Conservative	Basil Hammond	315	11.5	
Majority		755	27.6	
Turnout			30.2	
Labour hold		Swing		
