= 2015 Rotherham Metropolitan Borough Council election =

2015 local election in England

← 2014	7 May 2015	2016 →

One third of seats (22 of 63) to Rotherham Metropolitan Borough Council 32 seats needed for a majority
	First party	Second party
Party	Labour	UKIP
Seats won	18	3
Seat change	▼3	▲3
	Third party	Fourth party
Party	Conservative	Liberal Democrats
Seats won	0	1
Seat change	▼1	▲1
- Results of the 2015 Rotherham Metropolitan Borough Council election
Majority party before election
Labour
Majority party after election
Labour

The by-thirds 2015 Rotherham Metropolitan Borough Council election took place on Thursday 7 May 2015, to elect approximately one third of the members of the Rotherham Metropolitan Borough Council in England as part of the 2015 United Kingdom local elections held on the same day as the general election. All seats contested at this election were last contested in 2011, and of these, 20 were held by Labour Party councillors.

Following the premature resignation of former Cabinet member Cllr. Mahroof Hussain (L) elected in Boston Castle at a more recent election, his seat (for the Boston Castle ward) was also contested in the 2015 election. As the election is held by thirds, a Labour Party majority would fall if the party failed to win more than 2 of the 22 seats that were up for election in 2015.

Rotherham Metropolitan Borough Council Election Result 2015
Party	Seats	Gains	Losses	Net gain/loss	Seats %	Votes %	Votes	+/−
Labour	19			▼2	86.4	44.3	54,638	▲3.4
UKIP	3			▲3	13.6	35.3	43,569	▼9.0
Conservative	0			▼1	0.0	15.3	18,848	▲5.8
Independent	0			0	0.0	2.1	2,571	▼0.7
Green	0			0	0.0	1.7	2,079	▲1.2
Liberal Democrats	0			0	0.0	1.0	1,194	▲0.8
TUSC	0			0	0.0	0.4	492	▼0.2

== Council Composition ==
Prior to the election the composition of the council was:

↓
50	10	2	1
Labour	UKIP	C	I

After the election the composition of the council is:

↓
48	13	1	1
Labour	UKIP	C	I

C - Conservative Party
I - Independent

== Summary ==
Affiliation and year of election of Councillors before election
Party	Year of election			Total
Party	2011	2012	2014	Total
Labour	20	19	11	50
UKIP	0	0	10	10
Conservative	1	1	0	2
Independent (Clive Jepson)	0	1	0	1
Green	0	0	0	0
Liberal Democrats	0	0	0	0
TUSC	0	0	0	0

Result of election
Party			Change	After
Party	Not up	Won	±	2015 Council make-up
Labour	29	19	-2	48
UKIP	10	3	+3	13
Conservative	1	0	-1	1
Independent	1	0	±0	1

The governing group of councillors, holding a majority of 16, remained councillors of the Labour Party, with two fewer members within this group (now standing at 48 councillors) and one fewer within the smaller local party opposition group of councillors (Conservatives) as these three seats fell to UKIP affiliated candidates, bringing the official opposition group to 13 councillors. An Independent and a Conservative, who complete the Council Chamber, seek re-election in 2016.

== Election result ==
Rotherham Council Election Result 2014
Party	Candidates	Seats	Seats ±	Votes	Votes %	Next Council
Labour	21	11	– 8	27,793	43.40%	50
UKIP	21	10	+ 10	26,158	40.84%	10
Conservative	15	0	– 2	6,482	10.12%	2
Independents	4	0	unch.	1,886	2.94%	0
Green	2	0	unch.	487	0.76%	0
Respect	2	0	unch.	484	0.76%	0
TUSC	3	0	unch.	395	0.62%	0
PNP	1	0	unch.	223	0.35%	0
Liberal Democrats	1	0	unch.	136	0.21%	0
Total	70	21	—	64,044	100%	63
Rejected ballots				508	0.79%	

== Candidates in each ward ==
Ward	Candidates				Incumbent
Ward	Labour	UKIP	Conservative	Other	Incumbent
1. Anston and Woodsetts	Robert Taylor	Bernard Froggatt	Nichola Richardson	David Foulstone (Green); John Ireland (Ind.)	Dalton
2. Boston Castle (two seats)	Saghir Alam	Lisa Raby	Christian Kramer	Mohammed Ilyas (LibDem); Bingham Christopher (TUSAC)	Wooton
2. Boston Castle (two seats)	Taiba Yaseen	Peter Short	Christian Kramer	Mohammed Ilyas (LibDem); Bingham Christopher (TUSAC)	Hussain (resigned)
3. Brinsworth and Catcliffe	Andy Roddison	Ian Saunderson	Omar Mehban		Roddison
4. Dinnington	Jeanette Mallinder	Shaun Grice	Peter Higgins	Wendy Hamilton (Green); Dave Smith (Ind.)	Havenhand
5. Hellaby	Jenny Andrews	Richard Fleming	Anne Middleton	Shaun Barratt (Ind.)	Andrews
6. Holderness	Lyndsay Pitchley	John Jenkins	Michael Naughton	Helen Greer-Waring (Green); Michael Senior (Ind.)	Pitchley
7. Hoober	Jane Hamilton	Sandra Horridge	Brian Taylor	Steven Scutt (LibDem)	Hamilton
8. Keppel	Barry Kaye	Paul Hague	Kenneth Marshall	Neil Adshead (TUSAC); Janice Middleton (LibDem)	Kaye
9. Maltby	Christine Beaumont	Roger Jarvis	Jane Salt	Michael Conlon (Ind.)	Beaumont
10. Rawmarsh	Simon Evans	Alan Napper	Jo Taylor		Hamilton
11. Rother Vale	Darren Hughes	Robert Webster	William Salt		Swift
12. Rotherham East	Tajamal Khan	Leah Webster	Marilyn Marshall	Richard Penycate (Green)	Dodson
13. Rotherham West	Ian Jones	Steve Webster	Ruth Highfield		Foden
14. Silverwood	Jon Rosling	Melissa Owen	Denise Hall		Stone
15. Sitwell	Haroon Rashid	Julie Turner	Alex Walker		Gilding
16. Swinton	Eve Rose	Darren Corbett	Stephen Jones		Doyle
17. Valley	Dave Pickering	Brian Cutts	Anthony Kavanagh		Lakin
18. Wales	Dominic Beck	Dennis Flynn	John Cox	Paul Martin (Green)	Beck
19. Wath	Jayne Elliott	Brian Bailey	Lissa Higgins	Ann Roche (Green); Keith Roper (Ind.)	Sangster
20. Wickersley	Chris Read	Les Hince	Thomas Angel		Read
21. Wingfield	Richard Price	Rob Elliott	Ben Waters		Sharman
Total	19 seats (–2)	3 seats (+3)	0 seat (–1)		

== Results by Ward ==
In these results an asterisk indicates incumbent in the Ward, and Bold names highlight winning candidate.

=== Anston and Woodsetts ===
Rotherham Metropolitan Borough Council — Anston and Woodsetts Ward 2015
Party	Candidate	Votes	%	±%
Labour	Robert Taylor	1,873	31.7	
UKIP	Bernard Froggatt	1,819	30.8	
Conservative	Nichola Richardson	1,303	22.1	
Independent	John Ireland	523	8.9	
Green	David Foulstone	391	6.6	
Rejected ballots		26		
Turnout		5,935	66.5	
Registered electors		8,922		
Labour hold		Swing		
Majority		54	0.9	

=== Boston Castle ===
Rotherham Metropolitan Borough Council — Boston Castle Ward 2015 (two seats)
Party	Candidate	Votes	%	±%
Labour	Saghir Alam	2,703		
Labour	Taiba Yaseen	2,273		
UKIP	Peter Short	1,733		
UKIP	Lisa Raby	1,704		
Conservative	Christian Kramer	909		
Liberal Democrats	Mohammed Ilyas	448		
TUSC	Bingham Christophe	336		
Rejected ballots		48		
Turnout		5,826	61.42	
Registered electors		9,486		
Labour hold		Swing		
Labour hold		Swing		

=== Brinsworth and Catcliffe ===
Rotherham Metropolitan Borough Council — Brinsworth and Catcliffe Ward 2015
Party	Candidate	Votes	%	±%
Labour	Andy Roddison*	2,744	47.8	
UKIP	Ian Saunderson	2,318	40.3	
Conservative	Omar Mehban	684	11.9	
Rejected ballots		24		
Turnout		5,770	61.1	
Registered electors		9,444		
Labour hold		Swing		
Majority		426	7.5	

=== Dinnington ===
Rotherham Metropolitan Borough Council — Dinnington Ward 2015
Party	Candidate	Votes	%	±%
Labour	Jeanette Mallinder	2,037	35.4	
UKIP	Shaun Grice	1,746	30.3	
Conservative	Peter Higgins	1,106	19.2	
Independent	Dave Smith	515	8.9	
Green	Wendy Hamilton	351	6.1	
Rejected ballots		30		
Turnout		5,785	58.7	
Registered electors		9,850		
Labour hold		Swing		
Majority		291	5.1	

=== Hellaby ===
Rotherham Metropolitan Borough Council — Hellaby Ward 2015
Party	Candidate	Votes	%	±%
UKIP	Richard Fleming	2,317	37.1	
Labour	Jenny Andrews*	2,199	35.3	
Conservative	Anne Middleton	1,418	22.7	
Independent	Shaun Barratt	303	4.9	
Rejected ballots		36		
Turnout		6,273	66.2	
Registered electors		9,469		
UKIP gain from Labour		Swing		
Majority		118	1.8	

=== Holderness ===
Rotherham Metropolitan Borough Council — Holderness Ward 2015
Party	Candidate	Votes	%	±%
Labour	Lyndsay Pitchley*	2,570	42.0	
UKIP	John Jenkins	1,978	32.3	
Conservative	Michael Naughton	1,049	17.1	
Green	Helen Greer-Waring	266	4.3	
Independent	Michael Senior	257	4.2	
Rejected ballots		36		
Turnout		6,156	63.7	
Registered electors		9,663		
Labour hold		Swing		
Majority		592	9.7	

=== Hoober ===
Rotherham Metropolitan Borough Council — Hoober Ward 2015
Party	Candidate	Votes	%	±%
Labour	Jane Hamilton*	2,751	49.4	
UKIP	Sandra Horridge	1,642	29.5	
Conservative	Brian Taylor	860	15.4	
Liberal Democrats	Steven Scutt	320	5.7	
Rejected ballots		30		
Turnout		5,603	57.6	
Registered electors		9,731		
Labour hold		Swing		
Majority		1,109	19.9	

=== Keppel ===
Rotherham Metropolitan Borough Council — Keppel Ward 2015
Party	Candidate	Votes	%	±%
UKIP	Paul Hague	2,487	41.3	
Labour	Barry Kaye*	2,143	35.6	
Conservative	Kenneth Marshall	816	13.5	
Liberal Democrats	Janice Middleton	426	7.1	
TUSC	Neil Adshead	156	2.6	
Rejected ballots		30		
Turnout		6,058	65.3	
Registered electors		9,274		
UKIP gain from Labour		Swing		
Majority		344	5.7	

=== Maltby ===
Rotherham Metropolitan Borough Council — Maltby Ward 2015
Party	Candidate	Votes	%	±%
Labour	Christine Beaumont*	2,298	46.6	
UKIP	Roger Jarvis	1,658	33.6	
Independent	Michael Conlon	547	11.1	
Conservative	Jane Salt	432	8.8	
Rejected ballots		21		
Turnout		4,956	55.8	
Registered electors		8,886		
Labour hold		Swing		
Majority		640	13.0	

=== Rawmarsh ===
Rotherham Metropolitan Borough Council — Rawmarsh Ward 2015
Party	Candidate	Votes	%	±%
Labour	Simon Evans	2,702	51.9	
UKIP	Alan Napper	1,959	37.6	
Conservative	Jo Taylor	548	10.5	
Rejected ballots		33		
Turnout		5,242	54.5	
Registered electors		9,611		
Labour hold		Swing		
Majority		743	14.3	

=== Rother Vale ===
Rotherham Metropolitan Borough Council — Rother Vale Ward 2015
Party	Candidate	Votes	%	±%
Labour	Darren Hughes	2,529	44.7	
UKIP	Robert Webster	2,014	35.6	
Conservative	William Salt	1,112	19.7	
Rejected ballots		33		
Turnout		5,713	59.9	
Registered electors		9,537		
Labour hold		Swing		
Majority		515	9.1	

=== Rotherham East ===
Rotherham Metropolitan Borough Council — Rotherham East Ward 2015
Party	Candidate	Votes	%	±%
Labour	Tajamal Khan	2,527	53.2	
UKIP	Leah Webster	1,625	34.2	
Green	Richard Penycate	314	6.6	
Conservative	Marilyn Marshall	287	6.0	
Rejected ballots		35		
Turnout		4,788	52.6	
Registered electors		9,108		
Labour hold		Swing		
Majority		902	19.0	

=== Rotherham West ===
Rotherham Metropolitan Borough Council — Rotherham West Ward 2015
Party	Candidate	Votes	%	±%
Labour	Ian Jones	2,873	53.1	
UKIP	Steve Webster	1,964	36.3	
Conservative	Ruth Highfield	572	10.6	
Rejected ballots		33		
Turnout		5,442	56.9	
Registered electors		9,572		
Labour hold		Swing		
Majority		909	16.8	

=== Silverwood ===
Rotherham Metropolitan Borough Council — Silverwood Ward 2015
Party	Candidate	Votes	%	±%
Labour	Jon Rosling	2,527	44.5	
UKIP	Melissa Owen	2,251	39.6	
Conservative	Denise Hall	902	15.9	
Rejected ballots		33		
Turnout		5,713	59.8	
Registered electors		9,554		
Labour hold		Swing		
Majority		276	4.9	

=== Sitwell ===
Rotherham Metropolitan Borough Council — Sitwell Ward 2015
Party	Candidate	Votes	%	±%
UKIP	Julie Turner	2,716	41.7	
Labour	Haroon Rashid	2,056	31.6	
Conservative	Adam Walker	1,742	26.7	
Rejected ballots		58		
Turnout		6,572	69.1	
Registered electors		9,509		
UKIP gain from Conservative		Swing		
Majority		660	10.1	

=== Swinton ===
Rotherham Metropolitan Borough Council — Swinton Ward 2015
Party	Candidate	Votes	%	±%
Labour	Eve Rose	3,005	53.5	
UKIP	Darren Corbett	1,917	34.1	
Conservative	Stephen Jones	697	12.4	
Rejected ballots		27		
Turnout		5,646	61.1	
Registered electors		9,230		
Labour hold		Swing		
Majority		1,088	19.4	

=== Valley ===
Rotherham Metropolitan Borough Council — Valley Ward 2015
Party	Candidate	Votes	%	±%
Labour	Dave Pickering	2,566	48.8	
UKIP	Brian Cutts	2,066	39.3	
Conservative	Anthony Kavanagh	623	11.9	
Rejected ballots		45		
Turnout		5,300	56.3	
Registered electors		9,422		
Labour hold		Swing		
Majority		500	9.5	

=== Wales ===
Rotherham Metropolitan Borough Council — Wales Ward 2015
Party	Candidate	Votes	%	±%
Labour	Dominic Beck*	2,531	42.1	
Conservative	John Cox	1,615	26.8	
UKIP	Dennis Flynn	1,533	25.5	
Green	Paul Martin	337	5.6	
Rejected ballots		16		
Turnout		5,852	66.6	
Registered electors		8,789		
Labour hold		Swing		
Majority		916	15.3	

=== Wath ===
Rotherham Metropolitan Borough Council — Wath Ward 2015
Party	Candidate	Votes	%	±%
Labour	Jayne Elliott	2,834	46.0	
UKIP	Brian Bailey	1,733	28.1	
Conservative	Lissa Higgins	750	12.2	
Independent	Keith Roper	426	6.9	
Green	Ann Roche	420	6.8	
Rejected ballots		30		
Turnout		6,193	59.7	
Registered electors		10,382		
Labour hold		Swing		
Majority		1,101	17.9	

=== Wickersley ===
Rotherham Metropolitan Borough Council — Wickersley Ward 2015
Party	Candidate	Votes	%	±%
Labour	Chris Read*	2,786	46.8	
UKIP	Les Hince	2,186	36.8	
Conservative	Thomas Angel	976	16.4	
Rejected ballots		30		
Turnout		5,978	64.0	
Registered electors		9,342		
Labour hold		Swing		
Majority		600	10.0	

=== Wingfield ===
Rotherham Metropolitan Borough Council — Wingfield Ward 2015
Party	Candidate	Votes	%	±%
Labour	Richard Price	2,291	46.4	
UKIP	Rob Elliott	2,203	44.6	
Conservative	Ben Waters	447	9.0	
Rejected ballots		32		
Turnout		4,973	55.4	
Registered electors		8,980		
Labour hold		Swing		
Majority		88	1.8	
