= 2014 Rotherham Metropolitan Borough Council election =

2014 UK local government election

← 2012	22 May 2014	2015 →

One third of seats (21 of 63) to Rotherham Metropolitan Borough Council 32 seats needed for a majority
	First party	Second party
Party	Labour	UKIP
Seats won	11	10
Seat change	▼8	▲10
	Third party	Fourth party
Party	Conservative	Independent
Seats won	0	0
Seat change	▼2	Steady
- Results of the 2014 Rotherham Metropolitan Borough Council election
Majority party before election
Labour
Majority party after election
Labour

== Election result ==
Rotherham Council Election Result 2014
Party	Seats	Gains	Losses	Net gain/loss	Seats %	Votes %	Votes	+/−
UKIP	10	10	0	▲10	48.0	44.3	30,084	▲28.5
Labour	11	0	8	▼8	52.0	40.9	27,793	▼0.9
Conservative	0	0	2	▼2	0.0	9.5	6,482	▼12.6
Independents	0	0	0	Steady	0.0	2.8	1,886	▼6.8
Green	0	0	0	Steady	0.0	0.7	487	▲0.5
Respect	0	0	0	Steady	0.0	0.7	484	▲0.7
TUSC	0	0	0	Steady	0.0	0.6	395	▲0.6
PNP	0	0	0	Steady	0.0	0.3	223	▲0.3
Liberal Democrats	0	0	0	Steady	0.0	0.2	136	▼3.0

A total of 67,970 votes were cast. There were 508 spoiled ballots. The turnout was 34.79% The 2014 Rotherham Metropolitan Borough Council election took place on 22 May 2014 to elect members of Rotherham Metropolitan Borough Council in England. This was on the same day as other local elections.

A third of the seats was in play. The Councillors in this class were previously elected during the 2010 Rotherham Council election, in which Labour swept 19 out of 21 wards with 44% of the votes, thanks to the very divided opposition (Conservative, UKIP, BNP as well as Independents).

This was the first election since the Rotherham child sexual exploitation scandal broke. Turnout declined to about half of its 2010 figure (down to 34.79%). UKIP made huge gains, taking 10 of the 21 seats in play, their first ever at the Council.

Opposition to Labour was roughly equivalent to the levels of 2007, but Labour's majority on the Council was still safe despite being reduced from 58 to 50 (out of 63).

== Council Composition ==
Prior to the election the composition of the council was:

↓
58	4	1
Labour	Con	Ind

After the election the composition of the council was:

↓
50	10	2	1
Labour	UKIP	Con	Ind

== Ward results ==
Anston and Woodsetts
Party	Candidate	Votes	%	±%
Labour	Josephine Anne Burton*	1,339	38.8	−0.8
UKIP	Bernard Froggatt	1,308	37.9	+26.7
Conservative	Josephine Margaret Taylor	555	16.1	−19.7
Green	Charles David Foulstone	251	7.2	New
Majority		31	0.9	
Turnout		3,453	38.9	−28.7
Labour hold		Swing		

Boston Castle
Party	Candidate	Votes	%	±%
Labour	Rose Margaret McNeely*	1,428	39.2	−1.8
UKIP	Peter Gerard John Short	1,267	34.8	+21.5
Conservative	Christian Carl Backer Kramer	424	11.7	−9.1
Respect	Raisah Jan Mahmood	267	7.3	N/A
Liberal Democrats	Mohammed Meharban	136	3.8	−11.8
TUSC	Christopher James Edward Bingham	118	3.2	N/A
Majority		161	4.4	
Turnout		3,640	38.8	−22.7
Labour hold		Swing		

Brinsworth and Catcliffe
Party	Candidate	Votes	%	±%
Labour	Alan Buckley*	1,651	50.6	+3.7
UKIP	Julie Turner	1,611	49.4	+42.0
Majority		40	0.8	
Turnout		3,262	35.2	−26.4
Labour hold		Swing		

Dinnington
Party	Candidate	Votes	%	±%
UKIP	Ian Kenneth Finnie	1,293	42.1	+20.9
Labour	Jacqueline Margaret Falvey*	1,195	39.0	−10.8
Independent	David Smith	579	18.9	N/A
Majority		98	3.1	
Turnout		3,067	31.8	−26.9
UKIP gain from Labour		Swing		

Hellaby
Party	Candidate	Votes	%	±%
UKIP	Richard Arthur John Turner	1,825	51.7	+20.0
Labour	Janet Martin Mallinder	1,150	32.6	−10.2
Conservative	Omar Mehban	552	15.7	−5.3
Majority		201	19.1	
Turnout		3,527	37.9	−27.3
UKIP gain from Conservative		Swing		

Holderness
Party	Candidate	Votes	%	±%
Labour	Gerald Smith*	1,064	31.6	−1.4
UKIP	John Wilkinson	1,061	31.5	+27.4
Independent	Hilda Landells Jack	557	16.5	N/A
Conservative	Michael James Naughton	361	10.7	+3.3
Independent	David Henry Gee	226	6.7	N/A
TUSC	Paul Marshall	100	3.0	N/A
Majority		3	0.1	
Turnout		3,369	35.1	−27.8
Labour hold		Swing		

Hoober
Party	Candidate	Votes	%	±%
Labour	Brian Steele*	1,362	47.1	−4.1
UKIP	Michael John Pallant	1,151	39.8	+23.1
Conservative	Brian Eastwood Taylor	377	13.1	−9.1
Majority		211	7.3	
Turnout		2,890	30.6	−27.3
Labour hold		Swing		

Keppel
Party	Candidate	Votes	%	±%
UKIP	David Cutts	1,658	49.6	+23.8
Labour	Ian Colin Barron*	1,258	37.6	−9.3
Conservative	Michael Robinson	426	12.8	−1.3
Majority		400	12.0	
Turnout		3,342	36.3	−26.7
UKIP gain from Labour		Swing		

Maltby
Party	Candidate	Votes	%	±%
Labour	Amy Louise Rushforth*	1,183	41.9	+2.1
UKIP	Roger Jarvis	1,120	39.6	+30.9
Independent	Michael Conlon	524	18.5	+11.1
Majority		63	2.3	
Turnout		2,827	31.9	−23.6
Labour hold		Swing		

Rawmarsh
Party	Candidate	Votes	%	±%
UKIP	Caven Vines	1,563	52.0	+35.6
Labour	Jayne Christine Elliot	1,220	40.5	−14.5
Conservative	Beryl Charlotte Brown	227	7.5	−9.5
Majority		343	11.5	
Turnout		3,010	31.5	−22.6
UKIP gain from Labour		Swing		

Rother Vale
Party	Candidate	Votes	%	±%
UKIP	Gregory Reynolds	1,444	53.1	+22.0
Labour	Richard Scott Russell*	1,097	40.4	−15.8
TUSC	Neil Adshead	177	6.5	N/A
Majority		347	12.7	
Turnout		2,718	30.2	−28.0
UKIP gain from Labour		Swing		

Rotherham East
Party	Candidate	Votes	%	±%
Labour	Shaukat Ali	1,460	49.7	−15.8
UKIP	Timothy Michael Jones	1,240	42.2	+22.0
Green	Richard William Penycate	236	8.1	N/A
Majority		220	7.5	
Turnout		2,936	32.2	−17.5
Labour hold		Swing		

Rotherham West
Party	Candidate	Votes	%	±%
UKIP	Maureen Vines	1,567	44.0	+29.7
Labour	Jahangir Akhtar	1,528	42.9	−1.8
Conservative	Marilyn Marshall	248	7.0	−5.9
Respect	Sarah Kiran Mahmood	217	6.1	N/A
Majority		39	1.1	
Turnout		3,560	37.5	−19.7
UKIP gain from Labour		Swing		

Silverwood
Party	Candidate	Votes	%	±%
UKIP	Martyn Lawton Parker	1,672	51.8	+17.1
Labour	Patricia Anne Russell*	1,133	35.1	−14.3
Conservative	James Gedler	425	13.1	+0.7
Majority		539	16.7	
Turnout		3,230	33.8	−25.3
UKIP gain from Labour		Swing		

Sitwell
Party	Candidate	Votes	%	±%
UKIP	Allen Cowles	1,776	42.5	+30.2
Conservative	Anne Middleton	1,101	26.3	−15.2
Labour	Tajamal Khan	1,084	25.9	−8.7
Patients not Profits	Naveen Judah	223	5.3	N/A
Majority		675	16.2	
Turnout		4,184	44.3	−24.4
UKIP gain from Conservative		Swing		

Swinton
Party	Candidate	Votes	%	±%
Labour	Stuart James Sansome	1,464	46.4	−9.0
UKIP	Robert Eric Sanderson	1,405	44.5	+17.9
Conservative	Stephen Handel Jones	286	9.1	−9.4
Majority		59	1.9	
Turnout		3,155	34.5	−24.2
Labour hold		Swing		

Valley
Party	Candidate	Votes	%	±%
UKIP	Kathleen Ann Reeder	1,572	53.1	New
Labour	Dave Pickering*	1,387	46.9	+2.2
Majority		185	6.2	N/A
Turnout		2,959	32.0	+22.0
UKIP gain from Labour		Swing		

Wales
Party	Candidate	Votes	%	±%
Labour	Jennifer Whysall*	1,386	44.8	+3.5
UKIP	Dennis Flynn	1,108	35.8	+22.4
Conservative	Lucie Helen Brittain	601	19.4	−13.3
Majority		278	9.0	
Turnout		3,095	35.4	−30.6
Labour hold		Swing		

Wath
Party	Candidate	Votes	%	±%
Labour	Alan Atkin*	1,558	47.6	−7.5
UKIP	Brian Albert Bailey	1,409	43.1	+17.6
Conservative	Linda Elizabeth Higgins	303	9.3	−10.2
Majority		149	4.5	
Turnout		3,270	32.5	−26.5
Labour hold		Swing		

Wickersley
Party	Candidate	Votes	%	±%
Labour	Susan Ellis*	1,685	47.3	−1.2
UKIP	Brian Cutts	1,482	41.7	+26.5
Conservative	Alex Alan John Walker	392	11.0	−15.1
Majority		203	5.6	
Turnout		3,559	38.4	−24.5
Labour hold		Swing		

Wingfield
Party	Candidate	Votes	%	±%
UKIP	Lee James Hunter	1,552	53.2	+47.0
Labour	Keith Goulty*	1,161	39.8	+0.8
Conservative	Kenneth Rodney Marshall	204	7.0	−3.0
Majority		391	13.4	N/A
Turnout		2,917	32.2	−22.8
UKIP gain from Labour		Swing		
