= 2016 Rotherham Metropolitan Borough Council election =

2016 local election in England

- 5 May 2016

All 63 seats to Rotherham Metropolitan Borough Council 32 seats needed for a majority
| | First party | Second party |
|---|---|---|
| Party | Labour | UKIP |
| Seats won | 48 | 14 |
| Seat change | Steady | ▲2 |
Majority party before election
Labour
Majority party after election
Labour

2016 local election results in Rotherham

Rotherham Metropolitan Borough Council elections took place on Thursday 5 May 2016, alongside nationwide local elections. All 63 seats were up for election, 3 seats from each of the 21 wards.

Rotherham Metropolitan Borough Council Election Result 2016
| Party | Seats | Gains | Losses | Net gain/loss | Seats % | Votes % | Votes | +/− |
|---|---|---|---|---|---|---|---|---|
| Labour | 48 | 4 | 4 | Steady | 76.2 | 51.0 | 77,016 | ▲6.7 |
| UKIP | 14 | 3 | 1 | ▲2 | 22.2 | 29.5 | 44,563 | ▼5.8 |
| Conservative | 0 | 0 | 1 | ▼1 | 0.0 | 7.9 | 11,871 | ▼7.4 |
| Independent | 1 | 0 | 1 | ▼1 | 1.6 | 5.2 | 7,885 | ▲3.1 |
| Green | 0 | 0 | 0 | Steady | 0.0 | 3.6 | 5,426 | ▲1.9 |
| Liberal Democrats | 0 | 0 | 0 | Steady | 0.0 | 1.4 | 2,178 | ▲0.4 |
| Yorkshire First | 0 | 0 | 0 | Steady | 0.0 | 0.7 | 1,095 | ▲0.7 |
| TUSC | 0 | 0 | 0 | Steady | 0.0 | 0.6 | 960 | ▲0.2 |

This result has the following consequences for the total number of seats on the council after the elections:

| Party | Previous council | New council | +/- |
|---|---|---|---|
| Labour | 48 | 48 | 0 |
| UKIP | 12 | 14 | ▲2 |
| Independent | 2 | 1 | ▼1 |
| Conservatives | 1 | 0 | ▼1 |
| Total | 63 | 63 | |
| Working majority | 33 | 33 | |

== Ward results ==
Incumbent*

=== Anston and Woodsetts ===
Anston and Woodsetts 2016
| Party | Candidate | Votes | % | ±% |
|---|---|---|---|---|
| Independent | Clive Robert Jepson* | 1,240 | 15.6 | |
| Labour | Jonathan Charles Ireland | 1,183 | 14.9 | |
| Labour | Katherine Wilson | 1,038 | 13.1 | |
| UKIP | Bernard Froggatt | 1,003 | 12.6 | |
| UKIP | Phillip John Clarke | 974 | 12.2 | |
| Labour | Lauren Amy Edith Astbury* | 827 | 10.4 | |
| Independent | Christine Sadler | 724 | 9.1 | |
| Conservative | Anthony John Kavanagh | 582 | 7.3 | |
| Green | Charles David Foulstone | 382 | 4.8 | |
| Majority | | | | |
| Independent hold | | Swing | | |
| Labour hold | | Swing | | |
| Labour hold | | Swing | | |

=== Boston Castle ===
Boston Castle 2016
| Party | Candidate | Votes | % | ±% |
|---|---|---|---|---|
| Labour | Rose McNeely* | 1,843 | 24.1 | |
| Labour | Saghir Alam* | 1,662 | 21.7 | |
| Labour | Taiba Yasseen* | 1,626 | 21.2 | |
| UKIP | Lisa Michelle Raby | 1,201 | 15.7 | |
| Conservative | Christian Carl Backer Kramer | 844 | 11.0 | |
| TUSC | Christopher James Edward Bingham | 477 | 6.2 | |
| Majority | | | | |
| Labour hold | | Swing | | |
| Labour hold | | Swing | | |
| Labour hold | | Swing | | |

=== Brinsworth and Catcliffe ===
Brinsworth and Catcliffe 2016
| Party | Candidate | Votes | % | ±% |
|---|---|---|---|---|
| Labour | Alan Buckley* | 1,764 | 27.4 | |
| Labour | Andrew Scott Roddison* | 1,288 | 20.0 | |
| UKIP | Nigel Gary Simpson | 1,190 | 18.5 | |
| Labour | Shabana Ahmed* | 1,070 | 16.6 | |
| Liberal Democrats | Adam Jonathon Carter | 637 | 9.9 | |
| Conservative | Ruth Pauline Marsh | 480 | 7.5 | |
| Majority | | | | |
| Labour hold | | Swing | | |
| Labour hold | | Swing | | |
| UKIP gain from Labour | | Swing | | |

=== Dinnington ===
Dinnington 2016
| Party | Candidate | Votes | % | ±% |
|---|---|---|---|---|
| Labour | Simon Andrew Tweed* | 1,012 | 15.1 | |
| UKIP | Ian Kenneth Finnie* | 954 | 14.3 | |
| Labour | Jeanette Martin Mallinder* | 913 | 13.6 | |
| UKIP | Shaun Grice | 871 | 13.0 | |
| Independent | Dave Smith | 795 | 11.9 | |
| Independent | Jean Hart | 657 | 9.8 | |
| Independent | Les Clarke | 620 | 9.3 | |
| Conservative | Thomas Joseph Angel | 492 | 7.3 | |
| Green | Wendy Hamilton | 380 | 5.7 | |
| Majority | | | | |
| Labour hold | | Swing | | |
| Labour hold | | Swing | | |
| UKIP hold | | Swing | | |

=== Hellaby ===
Hellaby 2016
| Party | Candidate | Votes | % | ±% |
|---|---|---|---|---|
| UKIP | John Turner* | 1,406 | 16.7 | |
| UKIP | Brian Cutts | 1,324 | 15.7 | |
| Labour | Jenny Andrews | 1,233 | 14.6 | |
| UKIP | Richard Fleming* | 1,178 | 14.0 | |
| Labour | Janet Law | 1,147 | 13.6 | |
| Labour | Andrew James Fenwick-Green | 855 | 10.1 | |
| Conservative | Anne Middleton | 779 | 9.2 | |
| Green | Rebecca Louise Whyman | 520 | 6.2 | |
| Majority | | | | |
| UKIP hold | | Swing | | |
| UKIP hold | | Swing | | |
| Labour hold | | Swing | | |

=== Holderness ===
Holderness 2016
| Party | Candidate | Votes | % | ±% |
|---|---|---|---|---|
| Labour | Lyndsay Pitchley* | 1,679 | 21.8 | |
| Labour | Robert Paul Taylor* | 1,382 | 17.9 | |
| UKIP | Michael Elliott | 1,208 | 15.7 | |
| UKIP | John Jenkins | 1,188 | 15.4 | |
| Labour | Darren Jason Louis Hughes* | 1,177 | 15.3 | |
| Conservative | Michael James Naughton | 628 | 8.1 | |
| Green | Ian Barkley | 453 | 5.9 | |
| Majority | | | | |
| Labour hold | | Swing | | |
| Labour hold | | Swing | | |
| UKIP hold | | Swing | | |

=== Hoober ===
Hoober 2016
| Party | Candidate | Votes | % | ±% |
|---|---|---|---|---|
| Labour | Denise Lelliott* | 1,363 | 23.8 | |
| Labour | David John Roche* | 1,204 | 21.0 | |
| Labour | Brian Steele* | 1,185 | 20.7 | |
| UKIP | Amanda Cowles | 992 | 17.3 | |
| Conservative | Tyrrell Jane Bingham | 547 | 9.5 | |
| Liberal Democrats | Steven Scutt | 445 | 7.8 | |
| Majority | | | | |
| Labour hold | | Swing | | |
| Labour hold | | Swing | | |
| Labour hold | | Swing | | |

=== Keppel ===
Keppel 2016
| Party | Candidate | Votes | % | ±% |
|---|---|---|---|---|
| Labour | Maggi Clark* | 1,270 | 15.6 | |
| UKIP | David Cutts* | 1,227 | 15.1 | |
| UKIP | Paul Hague* | 1,153 | 14.2 | |
| Labour | John Foden | 1,110 | 13.7 | |
| UKIP | Christine Houghton | 1,082 | 13.3 | |
| Labour | Jo Baker-Rogers | 883 | 10.9 | |
| Liberal Democrats | Janice Middleton | 366 | 4.5 | |
| Conservative | Kenneth Rodney Marshall | 357 | 4.4 | |
| Yorkshire First | Peter Robert Key | 268 | 3.3 | |
| Green | Thomas Walter Hill | 266 | 3.3 | |
| TUSC | Neil Adshead | 135 | 1.7 | |
| Majority | | | | |
| Labour hold | | Swing | | |
| UKIP hold | | Swing | | |
| UKIP hold | | Swing | | |

=== Maltby ===
Maltby 2016
| Party | Candidate | Votes | % | ±% |
|---|---|---|---|---|
| Labour | Christine Beaumont* | 1,181 | 18.1 | |
| Labour | Amy Rushforth* | 1,037 | 15.9 | |
| Labour | Richard Price* | 984 | 15.0 | |
| UKIP | Roger Jarvis | 948 | 14.5 | |
| Independent | Jon Carratt | 750 | 11.5 | |
| Independent | Shaz Biggin | 555 | 8.5 | |
| Independent | Simon Ashley Ball | 452 | 6.9 | |
| Independent | Joy Bradford | 444 | 6.8 | |
| Conservative | Jane Rosemary Salt | 188 | 2.9 | |
| Majority | | | | |
| Labour hold | | Swing | | |
| Labour hold | | Swing | | |
| Labour hold | | Swing | | |

=== Rawmarsh ===
Rawmarsh 2016
| Party | Candidate | Votes | % | ±% |
|---|---|---|---|---|
| Labour | Bob Bird | 1,387 | 21.0 | |
| Labour | David Roy Sheppard | 1,234 | 18.7 | |
| UKIP | Sandra Marriott | 1,100 | 16.7 | |
| UKIP | Caven Vines* | 1,063 | 16.1 | |
| Labour | Emma Wallis* | 1,036 | 15.7 | |
| Green | Emily West | 442 | 6.7 | |
| Conservative | Josephine Margaret Taylor | 343 | 5.2 | |
| Majority | | | | |
| Labour hold | | Swing | | |
| Labour hold | | Swing | | |
| UKIP hold | | Swing | | |

=== Rother Vale ===
Rother Vale 2016
| Party | Candidate | Votes | % | ±% |
|---|---|---|---|---|
| Labour | Amy Caroline Brookes | 1,240 | 18.2 | |
| Labour | Bob Walsh | 1,146 | 16.9 | |
| Labour | Leon Allcock | 996 | 14.6 | |
| UKIP | Robert Donald Webster | 919 | 13.5 | |
| UKIP | Matthew Eyre | 916 | 13.5 | |
| UKIP | Greg Reynolds* | 855 | 12.6 | |
| Conservative | William Salt | 419 | 6.2 | |
| Green | Martin Brown | 308 | 4.5 | |
| Majority | | | | |
| Labour hold | | Swing | | |
| Labour hold | | Swing | | |
| Labour gain from UKIP | | Swing | | |

=== Rotherham East ===
Rotherham East 2016
| Party | Candidate | Votes | % | ±% |
|---|---|---|---|---|
| Labour | Wendy Cooksey | 1,336 | 23.0 | |
| Labour | Tajamal Khan* | 1,301 | 22.4 | |
| Labour | Deborah Fenwick-Green | 1,053 | 18.1 | |
| UKIP | Courtney Lea Webster | 999 | 17.2 | |
| Independent | Barry Dodson | 463 | 8.0 | |
| Green | Richard William Penycate | 420 | 7.2 | |
| Conservative | Marilyn Marshall | 241 | 4.1 | |
| Majority | | | | |
| Labour hold | | Swing | | |
| Labour hold | | Swing | | |
| Labour hold | | Swing | | |

=== Rotherham West ===
Rotherham West 2016
| Party | Candidate | Votes | % | ±% |
|---|---|---|---|---|
| Labour | Ian Paul Jones* | 1,589 | 24.3 | |
| Labour | Pat Jarvis | 1,552 | 23.8 | |
| Labour | Eve Rose Keenan* | 1,387 | 21.2 | |
| UKIP | Maureen Vines* | 1,232 | 18.9 | |
| Conservative | Keith Hunter | 423 | 6.5 | |
| TUSC | Pat McLaughlin | 348 | 5.3 | |
| Majority | | | | |
| Labour hold | | Swing | | |
| Labour hold | | Swing | | |
| Labour gain from UKIP | | Swing | | |

=== Silverwood ===
Silverwood 2016
| Party | Candidate | Votes | % | ±% |
|---|---|---|---|---|
| Labour | Ann Russell* | 1,200 | 15.8 | |
| UKIP | Alan Derek Napper | 1,170 | 15.4 | |
| Labour | Steve Marles | 1,157 | 15.2 | |
| UKIP | David Fleming | 1,095 | 14.4 | |
| UKIP | John Wilkinson | 1,041 | 13.7 | |
| Labour | Fakhary Saleh | 817 | 10.7 | |
| Conservative | Denise Helen Hall | 423 | 5.6 | |
| Independent | Martyn Lawton Parker* | 371 | 4.9 | |
| Green | Grant Thomas Morement | 327 | 4.3 | |
| Majority | | | | |
| Labour hold | | Swing | | |
| Labour hold | | Swing | | |
| UKIP gain from Independent | | Swing | | |

=== Sitwell ===
Sitwell 2016
| Party | Candidate | Votes | % | ±% |
|---|---|---|---|---|
| UKIP | Allen Cowles* | 1,466 | 15.0 | |
| UKIP | Peter Short | 1,304 | 13.3 | |
| UKIP | Julie Turner* | 1,277 | 13.0 | |
| Conservative | Christopher Norman Middleton* | 1,128 | 11.5 | |
| Labour | Jacquie Falvey | 1,024 | 10.5 | |
| Conservative | John Lester Oliver | 1,000 | 10.2 | |
| Labour | Neil Rushforth | 988 | 10.1 | |
| Yorkshire First | Mick Bower | 827 | 8.4 | |
| Labour | Abdul Rashid | 779 | 8.0 | |
| Majority | | | | |
| UKIP hold | | Swing | | |
| UKIP hold | | Swing | | |
| UKIP gain from Conservative | | Swing | | |

=== Swinton ===
Swinton 2016
| Party | Candidate | Votes | % | ±% |
|---|---|---|---|---|
| Labour | Victoria Cusworth | 1,621 | 23.4 | |
| Labour | Ken Wyatt* | 1,619 | 23.4 | |
| Labour | Stuart James Sansome* | 1,510 | 21.8 | |
| UKIP | Ruby Collins | 997 | 14.4 | |
| UKIP | Cassie Collins | 740 | 10.7 | |
| Conservative | Stephen Handel Jones | 426 | 6.2 | |
| Majority | | | | |
| Labour hold | | Swing | | |
| Labour hold | | Swing | | |
| Labour hold | | Swing | | |

=== Valley ===
Valley 2016
| Party | Candidate | Votes | % | ±% |
|---|---|---|---|---|
| Labour | Kerry Albiston | 1,227 | 18.0 | |
| Labour | Jayne Senior | 1,115 | 16.3 | |
| UKIP | Kath Reeder* | 1,087 | 15.9 | |
| Labour | Haroon Rashid | 878 | 12.8 | |
| UKIP | Leah Dawn Webster | 776 | 11.4 | |
| UKIP | Steven Benjamin Webster | 714 | 10.4 | |
| Independent | Dave Pickering* | 449 | 6.6 | |
| Independent | Simon Currie* | 365 | 5.3 | |
| Conservative | Omar Mehban | 222 | 3.2 | |
| Majority | | | | |
| Labour gain from Independent | | Swing | | |
| Labour gain from Independent | | Swing | | |
| UKIP hold | | Swing | | |

=== Wales ===
Wales 2016
| Party | Candidate | Votes | % | ±% |
|---|---|---|---|---|
| Labour | Dominic Edward Beck* | 1,584 | 22.3 | |
| Labour | Jenny Whysall* | 1,450 | 20.4 | |
| Labour | Gordon Watson* | 1,189 | 16.8 | |
| UKIP | Dennis Flynn | 1,065 | 15.0 | |
| Conservative | John Cox | 904 | 12.7 | |
| Green | Paul Neville Martin | 493 | 7.0 | |
| Liberal Democrats | Alan Vincent Marshall | 408 | 5.8 | |
| Majority | | | | |
| Labour hold | | Swing | | |
| Labour hold | | Swing | | |
| Labour hold | | Swing | | |

=== Wath ===
Wath 2016
| Party | Candidate | Votes | % | ±% |
|---|---|---|---|---|
| Labour | Alan Atkin* | 1,639 | 23.2 | |
| Labour | Jayne Elliot* | 1,496 | 21.2 | |
| Labour | Simon Evans* | 1,182 | 16.7 | |
| UKIP | Brian Albert Bailey | 1,095 | 15.5 | |
| UKIP | Jeffrey Cowles | 975 | 13.8 | |
| Green | Mykel Hedge | 364 | 5.1 | |
| Liberal Democrats | Abe Staples-McCall | 322 | 4.6 | |
| Conservative | Lissa Higgins | 316 | 4.5 | |
| Conservative | Beryl Brown | 307 | 4.3 | |
| Majority | | | | |
| Labour hold | | Swing | | |
| Labour hold | | Swing | | |
| Labour hold | | Swing | | |

=== Wickersley ===
Wickersley 2016
| Party | Candidate | Votes | % | ±% |
|---|---|---|---|---|
| Labour | Sue Ellis* | 1,814 | 22.0 | |
| Labour | Chris Read* | 1,426 | 17.3 | |
| Labour | Emma Hoddinott* | 1,424 | 17.2 | |
| UKIP | Dennis Harry Hardwick | 1,305 | 15.8 | |
| UKIP | Leslie James Hince | 1,224 | 14.8 | |
| Conservative | Peter Michael Higgins | 536 | 6.5 | |
| Green | Jo Baker | 531 | 6.4 | |
| Majority | | | | |
| Labour hold | | Swing | | |
| Labour hold | | Swing | | |
| Labour hold | | Swing | | |

=== Wingfield ===
Wingfield 2016
| Party | Candidate | Votes | % | ±% |
|---|---|---|---|---|
| UKIP | Robert William Elliott | 1,361 | 23.6 | |
| Labour | Sarah Ann Allen | 1,162 | 20.1 | |
| Labour | John Williams | 898 | 15.5 | |
| UKIP | Lee James Hunter* | 888 | 15.4 | |
| Labour | Mahroof Rashid | 644 | 11.1 | |
| Green | Keith Cooper | 540 | 9.3 | |
| Conservative | Barrie Marsh | 286 | 4.9 | |
| Majority | | | | |
| Labour hold | | Swing | | |
| Labour hold | | Swing | | |
| UKIP hold | | Swing | | |
