= 2010 Rotherham Metropolitan Borough Council election =

2010 UK local government election

Results of the 2010 Rotherham Metropolitan Borough Council election

The 2010 Rotherham Metropolitan Borough Council election took place on 6 May 2010 to elect members of Rotherham Council in South Yorkshire, England as part of the 2010 United Kingdom local elections. One third of the council was up for election.

After the election, the composition of the council was:

- Labour 50
- Conservative 10
- BNP 1
- Others 2

== Election result ==
Rotherham Council Election Result 2010
Party	Seats	Seats %	Votes	Votes %
Labour	19	90.48%	51,013	44.38%
Conservative	2	9.52%	26,158	22.76%
UKIP	0	0.00%	14,215	12.37%
Independents	0	0.00%	11,285	9.82%
British National Party	0	0.00%	8,322	7.24%
Liberal Democrats	0	0.00%	3,657	3.18%
Green	0	0.00%	292	0.25%

== Ward results ==
=== Anston and Woodsetts ===
Anston and Woodsetts
Party	Candidate	Votes	%
Labour	BURTON, Josephine Anne	2,369	39.56
Conservative	EDMUNDSON, Simon Paul	2,146	35.84
Independent	JEPSON, Clive Robert	801	13.38
UKIP	TAWN, Colin Edward	672	11.22
Turnout		5,988	67.6

=== Boston Castle ===
Boston Castle
Party	Candidate	Votes	%
Labour	MCNEELY, Rose Margaret	2,342	40.96
Conservative	HUSSAIN, Ashiq	1,191	20.83
Liberal Democrats	RAZAQ, Abdul	892	15.60
UKIP	MURDOCK, Peter Frederick	762	13.33
Independent	THOMPSON, Catherine Diane	531	9.29
Turnout		5,718	61.0

=== Brinsworth and Catcliffe ===
Brinsworth and Catcliffe
Party	Candidate	Votes	%
Labour	BUCKLEY, Alan	2,610	46.85
BNP	FIELDHOUSE, Terry Robert	982	17.63
Conservative	HUGHES, Shaun Richard	974	17.48
Independent	LOCKLEY, Keith	594	10.66
UKIP	WALSH, Margaret Rose	411	7.38
Turnout		5,571	61.6

=== Dinnington ===
Dinnington
Party	Candidate	Votes	%
Labour	FALVEY, Jacqueline Margaret	2,713	49.75
Conservative	DENMAN, Kristian	1,584	29.05
UKIP	HICKSON, Denise Margaret	1,156	21.20
Turnout		5,453	58.7

=== Hellaby ===
Hellaby
Party	Candidate	Votes	%
Conservative	DONALDSON, Lynda	2,254	37.97
Labour	ROBINSON, Glyn Barry	1,970	33.18
UKIP	FAIRFAX, Douglas	861	14.50
Independent	FOSTER, Andrew David	852	14.35
Turnout		5,937	65.2

=== Holderness ===
Holderness
Party	Candidate	Votes	%
Labour	SMITH, Gerald	2,891	48.59
Conservative	MARIC, Jovan	1,234	20.74
BNP	HOLMES, Thomas David	715	12.02
Independent	MARTIN, Paul Neville	632	10.62
UKIP	HICKSON, Martin	478	8.03
Turnout		5,950	62.9

=== Hoober ===
Hoober
Party	Candidate	Votes	%
Labour	STEELE, Brian	2,653	51.24
Conservative	JONES, Stephen Handel	1,150	22.21
UKIP	PALLANT, Michael John	862	16.65
Independent	NEWTON, Andrew	513	9.91
Turnout		5,178	57.9

=== Keppel ===
Keppel
Party	Candidate	Votes	%
Labour	BARRON, Ian Colin	2,077	35.13
Liberal Democrats	MIDDLETON, Janice	1,314	22.23
Conservative	WELLS, Russell James	1,287	21.77
BNP	KIRBY, Joanna Margaret	641	10.84
UKIP	CUTTS, David	593	10.03
Turnout		5,912	63.0

=== Maltby ===
Maltby
Party	Candidate	Votes	%
Labour	RUSHFORTH, Amy Louise	1,992	39.81
BNP	BURKE, Michael John	810	16.19
Independent	MILLWARD, Edward	787	15.73
Conservative	HUNTER, Keith	610	12.19
UKIP	BROWN, Gordon Hugh	433	8.65
Independent	CONLON, Michael James	372	7.43
Turnout		5,004	55.5

=== Rawmarsh ===
Rawmarsh
Party	Candidate	Votes	%
Labour	WRIGHT, Shaun	2,656	51.22
Conservative	TIPTAFT, David Howard Palmer	772	14.89
BNP	BALDWIN, William George	744	14.35
UKIP	STINSON, Douglas	721	13.91
Green	PENYCATE, Richard William	292	5.63
Turnout		5,185	54.1

=== Rother Vale ===
Rother Vale
Party	Candidate	Votes	%
Labour	RUSSELL, Richard Scott	2,468	47.33
Independent	FOULDS, Robert	1,588	30.45
Conservative	LEE, Nigel Haywood Wilton	1,159	22.22
Turnout		5,215	58.2

=== Rotherham East ===
Rotherham East
Party	Candidate	Votes	%
Labour	ALI, Shaukat	2,199	48.62
Liberal Democrats	ILYAS, Mohd	714	15.79
BNP	STEVENSON, Matthew	663	14.66
UKIP	GRIFFITH, Peter Crichton	421	9.31
Conservative	KRAMER, Christian Carl Backer	396	8.76
Independent	ARMESON, David	130	2.87
Turnout		4,523	49.7

=== Rotherham West ===
Rotherham West
Party	Candidate	Votes	%
Labour	AKHTAR, Jahangir	2,403	44.71
BNP	JESSOP, Brian	775	14.42
UKIP	VINES, Caven	767	14.27
Liberal Democrats	DAD, Basharat	737	13.71
Conservative	COOKE, Michael	693	12.89
Turnout		5,375	57.2

=== Silverwood ===
Silverwood
Party	Candidate	Votes	%
Labour	RUSSELL, Patricia Anne	2,359	42.00
Conservative	PARKER, Melissa	1,237	22.03
Independent	OUTRAM, Geoffrey	735	13.09
BNP	MITCHELL, John William	687	12.23
UKIP	WILKINSON, John	598	10.65
Turnout		5,616	59.1

=== Sitwell ===
Sitwell
Party	Candidate	Votes	%
Conservative	MANNION, Anthony Martin	2,684	41.51
Labour	DALTON, Judith Oliver	2,238	34.61
UKIP	WILKINSON, Valerie Irene	793	12.26
Independent	THIRLWALL, Jean	751	11.61
Turnout		6,466	68.7

=== Swinton ===
Swinton
Party	Candidate	Votes	%
Labour	LICENSE, Neil	2,902	54.98
UKIP	O'DELL, Shaun	1,402	26.56
Conservative	TAYLOR, Brian Eastwood	974	18.45
Turnout		5,278	58.7

=== Valley ===
Valley
Party	Candidate	Votes	%
Labour	PICKERING, Dave	2,188	44.70
BNP	PEARSON, Jason Paul	943	19.26
Conservative	BRITTAIN, Lucie Helen	936	19.12
Independent	RIDGWAY, David	828	16.92
Turnout		4,895	54.0

=== Wales ===
Wales
Party	Candidate	Votes	%
Labour	WHYSALL, Jennifer	2,320	41.33
Conservative	BLENCOWE, Charlotte Alicia	1,837	32.72
UKIP	FLYNN, Dennis	753	13.41
Independent	BLANKSBY, Peter Harold	704	12.54
Turnout		5,614	66.0

=== Wath ===
Wath
Party	Candidate	Votes	%
Labour	ATKIN, Alan	2,901	55.05
UKIP	BAILEY, Brian Albert	1,344	25.50
Conservative	TAYLOR, Josephine Margaret	1,025	19.45
Turnout		5,270	59.0

=== Wickersley ===
Wickersley
Party	Candidate	Votes	%
Labour	ELLIS, Susan	2,814	48.48
Conservative	ROSS, Donald Bruce	1,517	26.14
UKIP	DOWDALL, Tina Charisse	881	15.18
BNP	TURNBULL, Alan Norman	592	10.20
Turnout		5,804	62.9

=== Wingfield ===
Wingfield
Party	Candidate	Votes	%
Labour	GOULTY, Keith	1,948	39.04
Independent	SYLVESTER, Michael Donald Paul	1,467	29.40
BNP	GUEST, Marlene	770	15.43
Conservative	MIDDLETON, Christopher Norman	498	9.98
UKIP	VINES, Maureen	307	6.15
Turnout		4,990	55.0
