= 2007 Rotherham Metropolitan Borough Council election =

2007 English local government election

Results of the 2007 Rotherham Metropolitan Borough Council election

Elections to Rotherham Metropolitan Borough Council were held on 3 May 2007. The Labour Party kept overall control of the council. One third of the council was up for election and no boundary changes were made.

After the election, the composition of the council was:

- Labour 54
- Conservative 7
- Others 2

== Election result ==
Rotherham local election result 2007
Party	Seats	Gains	Losses	Net gain/loss	Seats %	Votes %	Votes	+/−
Labour	54		1		87.3			-1
Conservative	7	1			0.1			1
Other parties	2				0.03			0
