= Devon County Council elections =

Local government elections in Devon, England

Devon County Council elections are held every four years in order to elect the members of Devon County Council. Since the last boundary changes in 2017 the council has comprised 60 councillors, representing 58 electoral divisions. Since 1998, Plymouth and Torbay have been unitary authorities, making them independent of Devon County Council.

== Council elections ==
Year	Conservative	Liberal Democrats (Note: Liberal Party, 1973–1981; SDP–Liberal Alliance, 1985.)	Labour	Reform	Green (Note: Ecology Party, 1981–1985; Green Party (UK), 1989.)	Liberal	UKIP	NDM	SDP (Note: Social Democratic Party (UK, 1988–1990), 1989.)	Independent	Council control after election
1973	54	11	20	–	–	–	–	1	–	12	Conservative
1977	85	2	3	–	–	–	–	1	–	7	Conservative
1981	65	10	16	–	0	–	–	1	–	6	Conservative
1985 (Note: Boundary changes reduced the number of seats by 13.)	37	36	10	–	0	–	–	0	–	2	No overall control
1989	55	12	13	–	0	–	–	–	2	3	Conservative
1993	19	39	21	–	0	1	–	–	0	5	No overall control
1997 (Note: The number of seats decreased by 31 due to the removal of Plymouth and Torbay.)	13	31	4	–	0	2	–	–	–	4	Liberal Democrats
2001	22	21	5	–	0	2	0	–	–	4	No overall control
2005 (Note: Boundary changes increased the number of seats by eight.)	23	33	4	–	0	0	0	–	–	2	Liberal Democrats
2009	41	14	4	–	1	0	0	–	–	2	Conservative
2013	38	9	7	–	1	0	4	–	–	3	Conservative
2017 (Note: Boundary changes reduced the number of seats by two.)	42	7	7	–	1	0	0	–	–	3	Conservative
2021	39	9	7	0	2	–	0	–	–	3	Conservative
2025	7	27	0	18	6	–	–	–	–	2	No overall control

== County result maps ==
2005 results map

2009 results map

2013 results map

2017 results map

2021 results map

2025 results map

== By-election results ==
=== 1993-1997 ===
Plymstock Radford By-Election 7 November 1996
Party	Candidate	Votes	%	±%
Conservative		796	37.9	
Labour		659	32.5	
Liberal Democrats		599	29.5	
Majority		110	5.4	
Turnout		2,054	24.3	
Conservative hold		Swing		

=== 1997-2001 ===
Honickknowle By-Election 7 August 1997
Party	Candidate	Votes	%	±%
Labour		1,339	61.7	−16.5
Conservative		414	19.1	−2.8
Liberal Democrats		345	15.9	+15.9
		72	3.3	+3.3
Majority		925	42.6	
Turnout		2,170	23.0	
Labour hold		Swing		

Exwick and Cowick By-Election 10 December 1997
Party	Candidate	Votes	%	±%
Labour		1,036	59.4	+10.3
Conservative		336	19.3	−7.0
Liberal Democrats		282	16.2	−2.7
Liberal		90	5.2	−0.5
Majority		700	40.1	
Turnout		1,744		
Labour hold		Swing		

Ilfracombe By-Election 19 February 1998
Party	Candidate	Votes	%	±%
Conservative		1,163	45.5	+27.5
Liberal Democrats		700	27.4	−3.9
Labour		695	27.3	+15.9
Majority		463	18.1	
Turnout		2,558	32.0	
Conservative gain from Independent		Swing		

Bradnich and Creedy By-Election 31 March 1999
Party	Candidate	Votes	%	±%
Conservative		1,811	51.0	+7.7
Liberal Democrats		1,505	42.4	+4.6
Labour		150	4.2	−5.4
Liberal		82	2.3	−6.9
Majority		306	8.6	
Turnout		3,548	40.0	
Conservative hold		Swing		

Dawlish By-Election 28 October 1999
Party	Candidate	Votes	%	±%
Conservative		1,344	46.2	+7.8
Liberal Democrats		1,291	44.3	+1.4
Labour		277	9.5	−9.3
Majority		53	1.9	
Turnout		2,912	29.0	
Conservative gain from Liberal Democrats		Swing		

=== 2001-2005 ===
Ilfracombe By-Election 27 November 2003
Party	Candidate	Votes	%	±%
Liberal Democrats		756	39.0	+7.9
Conservative		686	35.4	−2.6
Independent		318	16.4	+8.9
Independent		178	9.2	+4.2
Majority		70	3.6	
Turnout		1,938	23.6	
Liberal Democrats gain from Conservative		Swing		

Exeter St Davids and Pennsylvania By-Election 26 February 2004
Party	Candidate	Votes	%	±%
Liberal Democrats	Sheila Hobden	1,330	41.3	+7.3
Conservative	Jeffrey Coates	1,090	33.8	+3.0
Labour	Lesley Robson	452	14.0	−13.0
Independent	Sylvia Hardy	351	10.9	+10.9
Majority		240	7.5	
Turnout		3,223	26.3	
Liberal Democrats hold		Swing		

=== 2005-2009 ===
Yealmpton By-Election 2 March 2006
Party	Candidate	Votes	%	±%
Conservative	William Mumford	1,530	49.5	+3.8
Liberal Democrats	Keith Baldry	1,421	46.0	+3.1
Labour	David Trigger	140	4.5	+4.5
Majority		109	3.5	
Turnout		3,091	35.9	
Conservative hold		Swing		

Alphington and Cowick By-Election 13 July 2006
Party	Candidate	Votes	%	±%
Liberal Democrats	Vanessa Newcombe	1,265	39.3	−4.5
Conservative	Margaret Baldwin	1,211	37.6	+17.8
Labour	Allan Hart	568	17.7	−8.7
Green	Andrew Bell	174	5.4	+0.8
Majority		54	1.7	
Turnout		3,218	30.0	
Liberal Democrats hold		Swing		

Exminster and Kenton By-Election 27 November 2008
Party	Candidate	Votes	%	±%
Liberal Democrats	Alan Connett	1,969	62.5	+12.1
Conservative	Francine Tullis	1,182	37.5	+0.4
Majority		787	25.0	
Turnout		3,151	42.9	
Liberal Democrats hold		Swing		

=== 2013-2017 ===
Yealmpton by-election 22 May 2014
Party	Candidate	Votes	%	±%
Conservative	Richard Hosking	2,493	57.9	+6.8
Liberal Democrats	Brian Blake	1,028	23.9	+6.2
Labour	David Trigger	706	16.4	+16.4
Majority		1,465	34.0	+1.8
Turnout		4,307	47.6	+11.8
Conservative hold		Swing		

=== 2017-2021 ===
Heavitree and Whipton Barton by-election 24 October 2019
Party	Candidate	Votes	%	±%
Labour	Greg Sheldon	1032	31.9	−19%
Conservative	John Harvey	992	30.7	−1%
Liberal Democrats	Rowena Squires	576	17.8	+11%
Green	Lizzie Woodman	563	17.4	+11%
For Britain	Frankie Rufolo	70	2.2	+2.2%
Majority		40	1.2%	−18.7%
Turnout		3,248	30.6	−10.4%
Labour hold		Swing		
