= Stuart Hughes (politician) =

British politician

Councillor for Sidmouth Sidford
- Incumbent
- Assumed office 1991

Member of Devon County Council for Sidmouth
- In office 1993–2025

Cabinet Member for Highways Management, Devon County Council

Cabinet Portfolio Holder for Communications, East Devon District Council
- In office 2003–2011

Personal details
- Party: Conservative
- Other political affiliations: Raving Loony Green Giant Party (until 1997)
- Occupation: Disc jockey, hotelier

Stuart "Huggy" Hughes is an English politician who has represented voters at all three levels of local government in Devon, in the West of England. He represents Sidmouth Sidford as a councillor on East Devon District Council and is also a Sidmouth town councillor. He was the councillor for Sidmouth on Devon County Council until the 2025 Devon County Council election, and was also the Cabinet member for Highways Management.

After twice standing unsuccessfully for the House of Commons for the Official Monster Raving Loony Party, he was elected at the district level in Devon in 1991 for the Raving Loony Green Giant Party, becoming the party's first successful candidate at a contested election of any kind. He was elected as an Independent at county level in 1993. However, he defected to the Conservatives in 1997 and was subsequently reelected in 2001, 2005, 2009, 2013, 2017, and 2021.

== Career ==
Hughes became a disc jockey in 1969. In the 1980s, he was a hotelier also an active member of the Official Monster Raving Loony Party. At the European Parliament election, 1989, Hughes stood for the Official Monster Raving Loony Party in the Devon constituency of the European Parliament, gaining 2,241 votes, less than 1% of the votes cast.

In 1989, he and others formed the breakaway Raving Loony Green Giant Party (RLGGP), mainly due to personality clashes with their local party leader, Howling Laud Hope.

He stood for parliament at the Mid Staffordshire by-election of 22 March 1990 and the Ribble Valley by-election of 7 March 1991, using the party labels "Raving Loony Green Giant Supercalafragalistic Party" and "Raving Loony Green Giant Clitheroe Kid" respectively. In Mid Staffordshire, he gained 59 votes, but improved on this in Ribble Valley to score 60.

In May 1991, Hughes was elected under the Raving Loony Green Giant Party banner to East Devon District Council and Sidmouth Town Council in the Sidmouth Woolbrook ward, after changing his name to 'Stuart Basil Fawlty Hughes', becoming the first "Raving Loony" candidate to win a contested election. He formed an alliance of Independents and a sole Green Party councillor which was known as "The Coastals", because of the seaside seats they held. In 1993, Hughes was elected as an Independent to Devon County Council, representing the Sidmouth Rural county division.

Hughes joined the Conservatives in March 1997. This was just in time to stand as a Conservative candidate at the 1997 local elections, when he was re-elected to Devon County Council. He was re-elected again at the 2001, 2005, and 2009 elections.

A supporter of the Sidmouth Folk Week, during the early 2000s Hughes was still organising local live musical events, staging bands such as The Strawbs and The Wurzels. Some forty years on from his debut as a disc jockey, he is still operating the 'Stuart Hughes Disco Show', using a Remote Control Frequencies sound system, a light show with LED technology and laser.

In Devon County Council, Hughes was the Cabinet member for Highways Management until 2025, and he remains a member of East Devon District Council, where he served as the Cabinet portfolio holder for Communications from 2003 to 2011. He previously served as Chairman of the county's Environment Economy and Culture Overview Scrutiny Committee.

Hughes is also a member of the South West Regional Flood & Coastal Committee, President of Sidmouth Town Football Club, Chairman of PATROL Parking & Traffic Regulations Outside London & a member of LGA Public Transport Consortium "Climate change poses the greatest threat to Sidmouth", and his political priorities include a coastal protection scheme, the creation of employment in the Sid Valley, maximising the potential of the Jurassic Coast World Heritage Site, and pedestrianisation.

At the 2009 Devon County Council election, Hughes won 3,553 votes, being 70.7 per cent of the votes cast, and had a majority of 2,428 over the Liberal Democrat runner-up.

At the 2013 Devon County Council election, Hughes won with 1,923 votes, being 47.2% of the total. The runner-up was Lawrie Brownlee of UKIP, who received 1,505 votes or 36.9% of the total.

Hughes again won reelection in 2017. He received 2,390 votes, being 47.3%. He beat his closest opponent, Marianne P Rixson of the East Devon Alliance by 481 votes. Rixson received 1,909 votes, or 37.7%.

In 2021, the East Devon Alliance was once again the principal opposition. Hughes received 2,601 votes, or 49.4%. Louise McAllister, the East Devon Alliance candidate, received 2,431 and 46.2%.

At the 2025 Devon County Council election, Hughes lost his seat to Denise Bickley of the Liberal Democrats.
