= 2005 Devon County Council election =

2005 UK local government election

- 5 May 2005

All 62 seats to Devon County Council 32 seats needed for a majority
- Registered: 563,668
- Turnout: 379,920; 67.4% (▼1.7 pp)
	First party	Second party	Third party
	LD	Con	Lab
Party	Liberal Democrats	Conservative	Labour
Last election	22 seats, 35.8%	22 seats, 37.4%	4 seats, 16.7%
Seats won	33	23	4
Seat change	▲12 (Note: Seats changes since the 2001 election are skewed by the increase of the number of council seats from 54 to 62 at the 2005 election)	▲1	▼1
Popular vote	142,414	142,732	44,813
Percentage	38.0%	38.0%	11.9%
Swing	▲2.1%	▲0.6%	▼4.6%
Reference
	Fourth party	Fifth party
	Ind	Lib
Party	Independent	Liberal
Last election	3 seats, 6.1%	3 seats, 2.0%
Seats won	2	0
Seat change	▼1	▼3
Popular vote	16,692	4,300
Percentage	4.4%	1.1%
Swing	▼1.7%	▼0.9%
Reference
Council control before election
No overall control
Council control after election
Liberal Democrat

The 2005 Devon County Council election was an election to Devon County Council which took place on 5 May 2005 as part of the 2005 United Kingdom local elections. 62 councillors were elected from various electoral divisions, which returned either one or two county councillors each by first-past-the-post voting for a four-year term of office. The electoral divisions had been redrawn since the last election in 2001. No elections were held in Plymouth and Torbay, which are unitary authorities outside the area covered by the County Council.

All locally registered electors (British, Irish, Commonwealth and European Union citizens) who were aged 18 or over on election day were entitled to vote in the local elections.

== Summary ==
The election saw the Liberal Democrats regain control of the council, which had last been under Liberal Democrat control after the 1997 election, but had been under no overall control since the 2001 election. The Conservative Party gained only one seat, despite the increase in the number of seats from 54 to 62 after redistricting, becoming the second-largest party on the council and therefore the official opposition party. The Liberal Party lost all three of its seats in the election, while the Independent grouping lost one seat. The Gallagher index for the election, which measures the disproportionality of seat allocation, was 11.94. (Note: A lower value indicates a more proportional outcome in the election; historically, UK general elections have had a value of around 16. The Gallagher index is worked out using the formula: $$\mathrm{Index} = \sqrt{ \frac{1}{2} \sum_{i=1}^n ( V_i-S_i ) ^2}$$ where $V_i$ is the per cent of votes and $S_i$ is the per cent of seats for each of the parties ($i=1,\ldots,n$). (Note: For this election, the Gallagher Index can be worked out as: Party / % of votes / % of seats / difference / difference squared; Liberal Democrats / 38.0 / 53.2 / 15.2 / 231.04; Conservatives / 38.0 / 37.1 / -0.9 / 0.81; Labour / 11.9 / 6.5 / -5.4 / 29.16; Independent / 4.4 / 3.2 / -1.2 / 1.44; UKIP / 3.9 / 0.0 / -3.9 / 15.21; Green / 2.5 / 0.0 / -2.5 / 6.25; Liberal / 1.1 / 0.0 / -1.1 / 1.21; Other / 0.02 / 0.0 / -0.02 / 0.0004; total of squares of differences / / / / 285.1204; total / 2 / / / / 142.5602; square root of (total / 2) / / / / 11.93986))

== Results ==
Devon County Council election, 2005
Party	Seats	Net gain/loss	Seats %	Votes %	Votes	+/−
Liberal Democrats	33	▲12	53.2	38.0	142,414	
Conservative	23	▲1	37.1	38.0	142,732	
Labour	4	▼1	6.5	11.9	44,813	
Independent	2	▼2	3.2	4.4	16,692	
UKIP	0	Steady	0.0	3.9	14,643	
Green	0	Steady	0.0	2.5	9,539	
Liberal	0	▼2	0.0	1.1	4,300	

== Electoral division results ==
Alphington and Cowick
Party	Candidate	Votes	%	±%
Liberal Democrats	M. Browning	3,188	43.8	
Labour	R. Harris	1,919	26.4	
Conservative	M. Baldwin	1,443	19.8	
Green	A. Bell	331	4.6	
UKIP	D. Challice	282	3.9	
Liberal	P. Smith	109	1.5	
Majority		1,269	17.5	
Turnout		7,272	67.2	
Registered electors		10,829		
Liberal Democrats win (new seat)				

Ashburton and Buckfastleigh
Party	Candidate	Votes	%	±%
Conservative	Stuart Barker	2,793	38.9	
Liberal Democrats	Graham Wickham	2,663	37.1	
Labour	Michael Harriott	999	13.9	
UKIP	Kim Van Der Kiste	636	8.9	
Majority		130	1.8	
Rejected ballots		83	1.2	
Turnout		7,174	71.5	
Registered electors		10,030		
Conservative win (new seat)				

Axminster
Party	Candidate	Votes	%	±%
Liberal Democrats	Douglas Hull	2,912	44.9	
Conservative	Iain Chubb	2,908	44.9	
Labour	Jeremy Walden	581	9.0	
Majority		4	0.1	
Rejected ballots		82	1.3	
Turnout		6,483	73.1	
Registered electors		8,874		
Liberal Democrats win (new seat)				

Barnstaple North
Party	Candidate	Votes	%	±%
Liberal Democrats	Brian Greenslade	3,411	56.1	
Conservative	John Gill	1,305	21.5	
Labour	Annie Brenton	720	11.9	
Green	Earl Bramley-Howard	572	9.4	
Majority		2,106	34.7	
Rejected ballots		67	1.1	
Turnout		6,075	60.4	
Registered electors		10,055		
Liberal Democrats win (new seat)				

Barnstaple South
Party	Candidate	Votes	%	±%
Liberal Democrats	Christopher Haywood	3,116	49.6	
Conservative	David Brailey	1,999	31.8	
Green	Robert Cornish	596	9.5	
Independent	Terence Bawden	474	7.5	
Majority		1,117	17.8	
Rejected ballots		103	1.6	
Turnout		6,288	64.7	
Registered electors		9,726		
Liberal Democrats win (new seat)				

Bickleigh and Wembury
Party	Candidate	Votes	%	±%
Conservative	Thomas Hart	3,073	50.3	
Liberal Democrats	Cedric Tarsky	2,219	36.3	
UKIP	James McOustra	763	12.5	
Majority		854	9.6	
Rejected ballots		55	0.9	
Turnout		6,110	68.4	
Registered electors		8,937		
Conservative win (new seat)				

Bideford East
Party	Candidate	Votes	%	±%
Liberal Democrats	Hugo Barton	2,613	46.9	
Ind. Conservative	Christopher Leather	1,891	33.9	
Labour	David Brenton	1,001	18.0	
Majority		722	13.0	
Rejected ballots		67	1.2	
Turnout		5,572	62.7	
Registered electors		8,883		
Liberal Democrats win (new seat)				

Bideford South and Hartland
Party	Candidate	Votes	%	±%
Liberal Democrats	Humphrey Temperley	2,825	46.8	
Ind. Conservative	Robert Williamson	2,162	35.8	
Labour	Vivian Gale	978	16.2	
Majority		663	11.0	
Rejected ballots		76	1.3	
Turnout		6,041	67.4	
Registered electors		8,957		
Liberal Democrats win (new seat)				

Bovey Tracey Rural
Party	Candidate	Votes	%	±%
Liberal Democrats	Sally Morgan	3,041	48.2	
Conservative	Audrey Warren	2,627	41.6	
Labour	Jacqueline Lamont	587	9.3	
Majority		414	6.6	
Rejected ballots		55	0.9	
Turnout		6,310	74.5	
Registered electors		8,468		
Liberal Democrats win (new seat)				

Braunton Rural
Party	Candidate	Votes	%	±%
Liberal Democrats	Jennifer Jenkins	2,325	36.1	
Conservative	Jasmine Chesters	2,250	34.9	
Independent	Charles Piper	610	9.5	
Green	Michael Harrison	607	9.4	
Labour	Danny Neary	566	8.8	
Majority		75	1.2	
Rejected ballots		82	1.3	
Turnout		6,440	69.0	
Registered electors		9,327		
Liberal Democrats win (new seat)				

Broadclyst and Whimple
Party	Candidate	Votes	%	±%
Liberal Democrats	Derek Button	3,039	47.1	
Conservative	Peter Bowden	2,863	44.3	
Liberal	Grace Burns	411	6.4	
Majority		176	2.7	
Rejected ballots		145	2.2	
Turnout		6,458	72.4	
Registered electors		8,922		
Liberal Democrats win (new seat)				

Budleigh
Party	Candidate	Votes	%	±%
Conservative	Christine Channon	3,454	55.0	
Liberal Democrats	Phillip Frewin-Smith	1,862	29.7	
Labour	Stuart Fegan	865	13.8	
Majority		1,592	25.4	
Rejected ballots		94	1.5	
Turnout		6,275	73.1	
Registered electors		8,579		
Conservative win (new seat)				

Chudleigh Rural
Party	Candidate	Votes	%	±%
Conservative	Francis Brook	2,330	35.0	
Liberal Democrats	Keith Smith	2,052	30.8	
Independent	Raymond Frost	1,451	21.8	
Labour	Barbara Errington	754	11.3	
Majority		278	4.2	
Rejected ballots		75	1.1	
Turnout		6,662	73.7	
Registered electors		9,040		
Conservative win (new seat)				

Chulmleigh and Swimbridge
Party	Candidate	Votes	%	±%
Liberal Democrats	Frederick Tucker	3,209	45.4	
Conservative	Richard Edgell	2,848	40.3	
Green	Ian Godfrey	915	13.0	
Majority		361	5.1	
Rejected ballots		90	1.3	
Turnout		7,062	74.1	
Registered electors		9,529		
Liberal Democrats win (new seat)				

Combe Martin Rural
Party	Candidate	Votes	%	±%
Conservative	Vivienne Davis	2,522	44.1	
Liberal Democrats	Derrick Spear	2,414	42.2	
Green	Jon Hooper	706	12.3	
Majority		108	1.9	
Rejected ballots		81	1.4	
Turnout		5,723	70.4	
Registered electors		8,126		
Conservative win (new seat)				

Crediton Rural
Party	Candidate	Votes	%	±%
Liberal Democrats	Nicholas Way	3,105	49.9	
Conservative	Margaret Squires	2,183	35.1	
UKIP	Alan Green	472	7.6	
Green	Elizabeth Culpeper	380	6.1	
Majority		922	14.8	
Rejected ballots		82	1.3	
Turnout		6,222	69.3	
Registered electors		8,977		
Liberal Democrats win (new seat)				

Cullompton Rural
Party	Candidate	Votes	%	±%
Conservative	Edgar Berry	3,072	47.6	
Liberal Democrats	Rita Keylock	2,266	35.1	
Green	Colin Matthews	416	6.4	
UKIP	Gatson Dezart	407	6.3	
Liberal	Janett Rice	233	3.6	
Majority		806	12.5	
Rejected ballots		66	1.0	
Turnout		6,460	66.3	
Registered electors		9,741		
Conservative win (new seat)				

Dartmouth and Kingswear
Party	Candidate	Votes	%	±%
Conservative	Jonathan Hawkins	2,435	50.0	
Liberal Democrats	Anthony Phillips	1,280	26.3	
Labour	Brian Boughton	649	13.3	
UKIP	Roger Kempton	471	9.7	
Majority		1,155	23.7	
Rejected ballots		31	0.6	
Turnout		4,866	69.2	
Registered electors		7,031		
Conservative win (new seat)				

Dawlish
Party	Candidate	Votes	%	±%
Conservative	John Clatworthy	3,246	45.1	
Liberal Democrats	Alan Connett	2,843	39.5	
Labour	James Court	1,051	14.6	
Majority		403	5.6	
Rejected ballots		56	0.8	
Turnout		7,196	68.3	
Registered electors		10,535		
Conservative win (new seat)				

Duryard and Pennsylvania
Party	Candidate	Votes	%	±%
Liberal Democrats	Sheila Hobden	2,486	45.6	
Conservative	Daniel Thomas	1,690	31.0	
Labour	Dorothy Parker	981	18.0	
UKIP	Graham Stone	166	3.0	
Socialist Alternative	Trevor Clissold	65	1.2	
Majority		796	14.6	
Rejected ballots		66	1.2	
Turnout		5,454	63.7	
Registered electors		8,565		
Liberal Democrats win (new seat)				

Exminster and Kenton
Party	Candidate	Votes	%	±%
Liberal Democrats	B. Berman	2,582	50.4	
Conservative	S. Webber	1,901	37.1	
Labour	G. Hesse	641	12.5	
Majority		681	13.3	
Turnout		5,124	71.6	
Registered electors		7,153		
Liberal Democrats win (new seat)				

Exmouth Brixington and Withycombe
Party	Candidate	Votes	%	±%
Liberal Democrats	Brenda Taylor	3,458	52.0	
Conservative	Jill Elson	2,097	31.6	
UKIP	David Wilson	685	10.3	
Independent	Raymond Widdowson	239	3.6	
Majority		1,361	20.5	
Rejected ballots		166	2.5	
Turnout		6,645	64.8	
Registered electors		10,259		
Liberal Democrats win (new seat)				

Exmouth Halsdon and Woodbury
Party	Candidate	Votes	%	±%
Conservative	Bernard Hughes	2,405	40.1	
Liberal Democrats	Patricia Graham	2,351	39.2	
Labour	Carole Newton	779	13.0	
UKIP	John Kelly	422	7.0	
Majority		54	0.9	
Rejected ballots		40	0.7	
Turnout		5,997	70.8	
Registered electors		8,467		
Conservative win (new seat)				

Exmouth Littleham and Town
Party	Candidate	Votes	%	±%
Liberal Democrats	Eileen Wragg	2,690	42.0	
Conservative	Kathleen Bamsey	2,166	33.8	
Labour	Patrick Canavan	1,017	15.9	
UKIP	Colin Evans	438	6.8	
Majority		524	8.2	
Rejected ballots		96	1.5	
Turnout		6,407	64.2	
Registered electors		9,985		
Liberal Democrats win (new seat)				

Exwick and St Thomas
Party	Candidate	Votes	%	±%
Liberal Democrats	Rob Hannaford	3,141	43.1	
Labour	Lesley Robson	2,626	36.0	
Conservative	David Henson	1,080	14.8	
UKIP	Lawrence Harper	378	5.2	
Majority		515	7.1	
Rejected ballots		66	0.9	
Turnout		7,291	64.8	
Registered electors		11,253		
Liberal Democrats win (new seat)				

Fremington Rural
Party	Candidate	Votes	%	±%
Conservative	Rodney Cann	2,758	48.4	
Independent	David Jury	1,765	31.0	
Green	Linda Mack	997	17.5	
Majority		993	17.4	
Rejected ballots		174	3.1	
Turnout		5,694	70.7	
Registered electors		8,058		
Conservative win (new seat)				

Hatherleigh and Chagford
Party	Candidate	Votes	%	±%
Conservative	James McInnes	3,358	47.6	
Liberal Democrats	Anne Carter	2,609	37.0	
UKIP	Susan Bamford	529	7.5	
Labour	Brenda Lopez	493	7.0	
Majority		749	10.6	
Rejected ballots		62	0.9	
Turnout		7,051	76.8	
Registered electors		9,178		
Conservative win (new seat)				

Heavitree and Whipton Barton
Party	Candidate	Votes	%	±%
Labour	Olwen Foggin	2,419	35.6	
Liberal	Christopher Gale	1,454	21.4	
Liberal Democrats	Tessa Barrett	1,379	20.3	
Conservative	Keith Nelson-Tomsen	1,201	17.7	
UKIP	Rosalinde Myrone	285	4.2	
Majority		965	14.2	
Rejected ballots		62	0.9	
Turnout		6,800	66.8	
Registered electors		10,174		
Conservative win (new seat)				

Holsworthy Rural
Party	Candidate	Votes	%	±%
Liberal Democrats	Desmond Shadrick	3,864	54.4	
Conservative	Gaye Tabor	2,617	36.9	
Labour	William Vanstone	517	7.3	
Majority		1,247	17.6	
Rejected ballots		100	1.4	
Turnout		7,098	73.4	
Registered electors		9,665		
Liberal Democrats win (new seat)				

Honiton St Michael's
Party	Candidate	Votes	%	±%
Conservative	Barry Nicholson	2,889	47.8	
Liberal Democrats	Amanda Pettet	1,751	29.0	
Labour	Richard Price	831	13.7	
Liberal	Lucy Collins	481	8.0	
Majority		1,138	18.8	
Rejected ballots		92	1.5	
Turnout		6,044	69.1	
Registered electors		8,741		
Conservative win (new seat)				

Honiton St Paul's
Party	Candidate	Votes	%	±%
Conservative	Roger Boote	3,145	49.0	
Liberal Democrats	Roy Coombs	1,736	27.0	
Labour	Sally Boom	972	15.1	
Liberal	Roy Collins	510	7.9	
Majority		1,409		
Rejected ballots		56	0.9	
Turnout		6,419	71.5	
Registered electors		8,980		
Conservative win (new seat)				

Ilfracombe
Party	Candidate	Votes	%	±%
Liberal Democrats	Geoffrey Fowler	2,132	41.6	
Conservative	Paul Crabb	1,783	34.8	
Independent	Ivan Frances	716	14.0	
Green	Franklin Pearson	443	8.6	
Majority		349	6.8	
Rejected ballots		51	1.0	
Turnout		5,125	58.4	
Registered electors		8,778		
Liberal Democrats win (new seat)				

Ivybridge
Party	Candidate	Votes	%	±%
Conservative	Roger Croad	2,115	36.1	
Labour	Evonne Beeson	1,592	27.1	
Liberal Democrats	David Corney	1,586	27.0	
UKIP	Brian Gerrish	541	9.2	
Majority		523	8.9	
Rejected ballots		31	0.5	
Turnout		5,865	65.9	
Registered electors		8,894		
Conservative win (new seat)				

Axminster
Party	Candidate	Votes	%	±%
Liberal Democrats	Douglas Hull	2,912	44.9	
Conservative	Iain Chubb	2,908	44.9	
Labour	Jeremy Walden	581	9.0	
Majority		4	0.1	
Rejected ballots		82	1.3	
Turnout		6,483	73.1	
Registered electors		8,874		
Liberal Democrats win (new seat)				

Kingsbridge and Stokenham
Party	Candidate	Votes	%	±%
Liberal Democrats	Julian Brazil	2,806	48.5	
Conservative	Owen Masters	2,266	39.2	
UKIP	Stephen Dooley	625	10.8	
Majority		540	9.3	
Rejected ballots		90	1.6	
Turnout		5,787	72.2	
Registered electors		8,012		
Liberal Democrats win (new seat)				

Kingsteignston
Party	Candidate	Votes	%	±%
Liberal Democrats	John Smith	2,450	43.0	
Conservative	Michael Walters	1,978	34.7	
Labour	James White	1,200	21.1	
Majority		472	8.3	
Rejected ballots		72	1.3	
Turnout		5,700	65.4	
Registered electors		8,712		
Liberal Democrats win (new seat)				

Newton Abbot North
Party	Candidate	Votes	%	±%
Liberal Democrats	Anne Fry	2,829	51.9	
Conservative	Mark Johnson	1,641	30.1	
Labour	Barry Kaye	903	16.6	
Majority		1,188	21.8	
Rejected ballots		82	1.5	
Turnout		5,455	62.6	
Registered electors		8,710		
Liberal Democrats win (new seat)				

Newton Abbot South
Party	Candidate	Votes	%	±%
Liberal Democrats	Gordon Hook	3,275	52.2	
Conservative	Allan Vizor	1,819	29.0	
Labour	Louise Lewis	1,048	16.7	
Majority		1,456	23.2	
Rejected ballots		135	2.2	
Turnout		6,277	65.6	
Registered electors		9,565		
Liberal Democrats win (new seat)				

Newton St Cyres and Sandford
Party	Candidate	Votes	%	±%
Conservative	Michael Lee	3,425	50.6	
Liberal Democrats	Gillian Elston	2,144	31.3	
Green	Linda Lever	736	10.9	
UKIP	Robert Edwards	449	6.6	
Majority		1,311	19.4	
Rejected ballots		39	0.6	
Turnout		6,736	76.9	
Registered electors		8,795		
Conservative win (new seat)				

Newtown and Polsloe
Party	Candidate	Votes	%	±%
Labour	Richard Westlake	1,779	32.9	
Conservative	Yolanda Henson	1,387	25.7	
Liberal Democrats	Pamela Thickett	1,380	25.5	
Green	Nicholas Discombe	695	12.9	
Independent	Dale Woolner	100	1.8	
Majority		392	7.2	
Rejected ballots		66	1.2	
Turnout		5,407	64.4	
Registered electors		8,390		
Labour win (new seat)				

Northam
Party	Candidate	Votes	%	±%
Liberal Democrats	Leonard Ford	2,459	36.8	
Conservative	Anthony Collins	2,151	32.2	
UKIP	Andrew Eastman	1,190	17.8	
Labour	Sharon Prokowski	799	12.0	
Majority		308	4.6	
Rejected ballots		79	1.2	
Turnout		6,678	69.1	
Registered electors		9,668		
Liberal Democrats win (new seat)				

Okehampton Rural
Party	Candidate	Votes	%	±%
Conservative	Christine Marsh	3,216	43.4	
Liberal Democrats	Kenneth Williams	2,747	37.1	
Labour	Alison Young	740	10.0	
UKIP	William Kelly	632	8.5	
Majority		469	6.3	
Rejected ballots		69	0.9	
Turnout		7,404	72.0	
Registered electors		10,283		
Conservative win (new seat)				

Ottery St Mary Rural
Party	Candidate	Votes	%	±%
Independent	Arthur Giles	3,718	55.3	
Conservative	Thomas Fraser	1,815	27.0	
Liberal Democrats	Marion Olive	733	10.9	
Labour	Alfred Boom	416	6.2	
Majority		1,903	28.3	
Rejected ballots		46	0.7	
Turnout		6,728	74.6	
Registered electors		9,022		
Liberal Democrats win (new seat)				

Pinhoe and Mincinglake
Party	Candidate	Votes	%	±%
Labour	Saxon Spence	2,480	42.6	
Conservative	Ruth Smith	1,805	31.0	
Liberal Democrats	Nigel Gooding	1,442	24.8	
Majority		675	11.6	
Rejected ballots		89	1.5	
Turnout		5,816	66.8	
Registered electors		8,713		
Labour win (new seat)				

Priory and St Leonards
Party	Candidate	Votes	%	±%
Labour	Jill Owen	2,773	41.0	
Conservative	Norman Shiel	1,908	28.2	
Liberal Democrats	Rodney Ruffle	1,367	20.2	
UKIP	Leon Courtney	331	4.9	
Liberal	Keith Danks	297	4.4	
Majority		865	12.8	
Rejected ballots		89	1.3	
Turnout		6,765	65.1	
Registered electors		10,395		
Labour win (new seat)				

Seaton Coastal
Party	Candidate	Votes	%	±%
Liberal Democrats	Margaret Rogers	3,538	53.5	
Conservative	James Knight	2,624	39.7	
UKIP	Bernard Partridge-Hogbin	299	4.5	
Majority		914	13.8	
Rejected ballots		154	2.3	
Turnout		6,615	70.9	
Registered electors		9,327		
Liberal Democrats win (new seat)				

Sidmouth Sidford
Party	Candidate	Votes	%	±%
Conservative	Stuart Hughes	4,736	62.4	
Liberal Democrats	Brian Toye	1,733	22.8	
Labour	Ray Davison	973	12.8	
Majority		3,003	39.6	
Rejected ballots		143	1.9	
Turnout		7,585	72.4	
Registered electors		10,472		
Conservative win (new seat)				

South Brent and Dartington
Party	Candidate	Votes	%	±%
Conservative	James Pennington	2,903	45.5	
Liberal Democrats	Catherine Pannell	2,749	43.1	
Labour	Bill Reeves	614	9.6	
Majority		154	2.4	
Rejected ballots		116	1.8	
Turnout		6,382	73.4	
Registered electors		8,689		
Conservative win (new seat)				

South Molton Rural
Party	Candidate	Votes	%	±%
Conservative	Jeremy Yabsley	3,042	48.5	
Liberal Democrats	Susan Sewell	2,472	39.4	
Green	Jacqueline Morningmist	664	10.6	
Majority		570	9.1	
Rejected ballots		94	1.5	
Turnout		6,272	73.2	
Registered electors		8,573		
Conservative win (new seat)				

St David's and St James
Party	Candidate	Votes	%	±%
Liberal Democrats	Philip Brock	2,194	42.9	
Labour	John Poat	1,176	11.5	
Conservative	Simon Smith	952	18.6	
Green	Isaac Price-Sosner	586	11.5	
UKIP	Mark Fitzgeorge-Parker	140	2.7	
Majority		1,018	19.9	
Rejected ballots		69	1.3	
Turnout		5,117	59.5	
Registered electors		8,597		
Liberal Democrats win (new seat)				

St Loyes and Topsham
Party	Candidate	Votes	%	±%
Conservative	Andrew Leadbetter	2,081	35.9	
Labour	Rachel Lyons	1,261	21.8	
Liberal Democrats	Benjamin Noble	954	16.5	
Liberal	Margaret Danks	914	15.8	
UKIP	Eric Bransden	265	4.6	
Green	Paul Edwards	259	4.5	
Majority		820	14.2	
Rejected ballots		61	1.1	
Turnout		5,795	74.5	
Registered electors		7,776		
Conservative win (new seat)				

Tavistock
Party	Candidate	Votes	%	±%
Liberal Democrats	Roy Connelly	2,109	30.7	
Conservative	Philip Sanders	1,898	27.7	
Independent	Edward Sherrell	1,769	25.8	
Labour	Debra Hardy	565	8.2	
UKIP	Doreen Mudge	464	6.8	
Majority		211	3.1	
Rejected ballots		59	0.9	
Turnout		6,864	70.8	
Registered electors		9,698		
Liberal Democrats win (new seat)				

Teign Estuary
Party	Candidate	Votes	%	±%
Liberal Democrats	David Cox	1,837	32.0	
Conservative	Cecilia Brown	1,491	26.0	
Independent	Christopher Clarance	957	16.7	
Labour	Mary Kennedy	802	14.0	
UKIP	Christopher Whitlock	594	10.4	
Majority		346	60.3	
Rejected ballots		56	1.0	
Turnout		5,737	68.0	
Registered electors		8,433		
Liberal Democrats win (new seat)				

Teignbridge South
Party	Candidate	Votes	%	±%
Liberal Democrats	Philip Cook	2,406	37.4	
Conservative	William Long	2,088	32.4	
Independent	Mary Colclough	1,192	18.5	
Labour	Edony Verbrugge	660	10.3	
Majority		318	4.9	
Rejected ballots		92	1.4	
Turnout		6,438	73.5	
Registered electors		8,756		
Liberal Democrats win (new seat)				

Teignmouth Town
Party	Candidate	Votes	%	±%
Liberal Democrats	Christopher Bray	1,883	35.1	
Conservative	Geoffrey Bladon	1,465	27.3	
Independent	Sylvia Russell	784	14.6	
Labour	Margaret Tucker	564	10.5	
Independent	Roy Phillips	590	11.0	
Majority		418	7.8	
Rejected ballots		83	1.5	
Turnout		5,369	70.7	
Registered electors		7,593		
Liberal Democrats win (new seat)				

Thurlestone, Salcombe and Allington
Party	Candidate	Votes	%	±%
Conservative	Simon Day	2,820	52.1	
Liberal Democrats	Rosalind Spears	2,006	37.0	
Labour	David Trigger	530	9.8	
Majority		814		
Rejected ballots		59	1.1	
Turnout		5,415	70.0	
Registered electors		7,732		
Conservative win (new seat)				

Tiverton East
Party	Candidate	Votes	%	±%
Liberal Democrats	Desmond Hannon	2,485	44.6	
Conservative	Dennis Knowles	2,269	40.7	
UKIP	Christopher Caffin	735	13.2	
Majority		216	3.9	
Rejected ballots		80	1.4	
Turnout		5,569	60.9	
Registered electors		9,146		
Liberal Democrats win (new seat)				

Tiverton West
Party	Candidate	Votes	%	±%
Independent	Mary Turner	2,327	35.8	
Conservative	Alan Griffiths	1,693	26.1	
Liberal Democrats	Paul Williams	1,199	18.5	
Labour	Andrew Siantonas	594	9.1	
UKIP	Kenneth Gilderthorp	343	5.3	
Green	David Cottam	269	4.1	
Majority		634	9.8	
Rejected ballots		68	1.0	
Turnout		6,493	68.3	
Registered electors		9,503		
Independent win (new seat)				

Torrington Rural
Party	Candidate	Votes	%	±%
Liberal Democrats	John Rawlinson	2,849	40.6	
Conservative	William Morrish	2,788	39.7	
Labour	Heathcliffe Pettifer	714	10.2	
UKIP	Piers Merchant	596	8.5	
Majority		61	0.9	
Rejected ballots		70	1.0	
Turnout		7,017	70.6	
Registered electors		9,943		
Liberal Democrats win (new seat)				

Totnes Rural
Party	Candidate	Votes	%	±%
Liberal Democrats	Geoff Date	2,811	49.3	
Conservative	Ivor Hawkins	1,398	24.5	
Labour	Lorna Hughes	892	15.6	
UKIP	Peter Wyatt	531	9.3	
Majority		1,413	24.8	
Rejected ballots		69	1.2	
Turnout		5,701	70.6	
Registered electors		8,076		
Liberal Democrats win (new seat)				

Willand and Uffculme
Party	Candidate	Votes	%	±%
Conservative	Raymond Radford	3,115	46.1	
Liberal Democrats	Kevin Wilson	1,744	25.8	
Labour	Richard Bentley	835	12.4	
Green	William Cheesbrough	524	7.8	
UKIP	Marshall Haines	473	7.0	
Majority		1,371	20.3	
Rejected ballots		70	1.0	
Turnout		6,761	71.2	
Registered electors		9,501		
Conservative win (new seat)				

Yealmpton
Party	Candidate	Votes	%	±%
Conservative	E. Mitchell	2,873	39.4	
Liberal Democrats	K. Baldry	2,700	42.9	
UKIP	J. Williamson	714	11.4	
Majority		173	2.8	
Turnout		6,287	71.8	
Registered electors		8,756		
Conservative win (new seat)				

Yelverton Rural
Party	Candidate	Votes	%	±%
Liberal Democrats	Alan Hosking	2,810	38.9	
Conservative	Patrick Hitchins	2,770	38.4	
Labour	Edward Lopez	809	11.2	
UKIP	Andrew Mudge	783	10.8	
Majority		40	0.6	
Rejected ballots		50	0.7	
Turnout		7,222	73.9	
Registered electors		9,770		
Liberal Democrats win (new seat)				
