= Raving Loony Green Giant Party =

Satirical political party

- Leader: Stuart Hughes
- Founded: 1989
- Split from: Official Monster Raving Loony Party
- Ideology: Environmentalism; Political satire

The Raving Loony Green Giant Party was a political party in the United Kingdom.

== History ==
A splinter from the Official Monster Raving Loony Party (OMRLP), the party was led by Stuart Hughes, who had formerly been an election agent for the OMRLP. He fell out with the OMRLP party leadership following the 1989 European Parliament election, at which Hughes claimed to have become a Member of the European Parliament for 30 seconds after the returning officer incorrectly awarded him the Conservative Party candidate's votes.

The party stood candidates in the 1990 Mid Staffordshire by-election and the 1991 Ribble Valley by-election, where they finished behind the OMRLP, and in the 1992 general election.

The party adopted a mixture of joke and genuine policies: for example, that dog food should be luminous so that dog faeces would glow and people would not step in it at night, or that pensioners should receive free bus passes and street cleaning should be more frequent. Hughes described the approach as using humour as a gimmick to interest the press in his real priorities. The party's headquarters were the Fawlty Towers hotel in Sidmouth, owned by Hughes, with its facade painted as the Union Flag.

The party managed to stand a full slate of candidates for the Cannock Chase District Council elections in Staffordshire in 1990. Leader Stuart Hughes was elected to East Devon District Council and to Sidmouth Town Council in 1991, along with another RLGGP candidate, Stuart Greenwood. Hughes' first council meeting was recorded by a television crew from Australia and a reporter for The Observer newspaper, although he agreed with other council members that he would not wear his Loony campaigning outfit. Also in 1991, David and June Beesley were elected in Ribble Valley. In 1993, Hughes was elected to Devon County Council, representing the Sidmouth Rural ward.

The party became effectively defunct after Hughes's election to Devon County Council in 1993 and the defection of Danny Bamford (aka Danny Blue) back to the OMRLP. It has not stood any candidates for a number of years and is not registered with the Electoral Commission. Hughes officially joined the Conservative Party just before the 1997 United Kingdom local elections.

== See also ==
- List of frivolous political parties
- Rock 'n' Roll Loony Party
