= 2013 Devon County Council election =

2013 UK local government election

- 2 May 2013

All 62 seats to Devon County Council 32 seats needed for a majority
- Registered: 595,469
- Turnout: 198,448; 33.3% (▼10.6 pp)
	First party	Second party	Third party
Party	Conservative	Liberal Democrats	Labour
Last election	41 seats, 41.9%	14 seats, 29.9%	4 seats, 6.1%
Seats won	38	9	7
Seat change	▼3	▼4	▲1
Popular vote	69,825	31,683	26,044
Percentage	35.3%	16.0%	13.2%
Swing	▼6.6%	▼13.9%	▲7.1%
	Fourth party	Fifth party	Sixth party
Party	UKIP	Independent	Green
Last election	0 seats, 9.0%	2 seats, 4.6%	1 seats, 6.8%
Seats won	4	3	1
Seat change	▲4	Steady	Steady
Popular vote	45,550	11,148	12,785
Percentage	23.0%	5.6%	6.5%
Swing	▲9.0%	▲1.0%	▼0.3%
- Map showing the results of the 2013 Devon County Council elections.
Council control before election
Conservative
Council control after election
Conservative

An election to Devon County Council took place on 2 May 2013 as part of the 2013 United Kingdom local elections. 62 councillors were elected from electoral divisions which returned one county councillor each by first-past-the-post voting for a four-year term of office. The electoral divisions were the same as those used at the previous election in 2009. No elections were held in Plymouth and Torbay, which are unitary authorities outside the area covered by the County Council.

All locally registered electors (British, Irish, Commonwealth and European Union citizens) who were aged 18 or over on Thursday, 2 May 2013, were entitled to vote in the local elections. Those who were temporarily away from their ordinary address (for example, away working, on holiday, in student accommodation or in hospital) were also entitled to vote in the local elections, although those who had moved abroad and registered as overseas electors cannot vote in the local elections. It is possible to register to vote at more than one address (such as a university student who has a term-time address and lives at home during holidays) at the discretion of the local Electoral Register Office, but it remains an offence to vote more than once in the same local government election.

== Summary ==
The election saw the Conservative Party maintain overall control with a reduced majority of fourteen seats. The Liberal Democrats remained the council's largest single opposition party, while the Labour Party made a net gain of one seat. UKIP took its first seats on the council, winning four. The Green Party regained its seat (Totnes Rural) following an interim defection to the Labour Party. The election also saw three independent councillors elected.

== Results ==
Devon County Council election, 2013
Party	Seats	Gains	Losses	Net gain/loss	Seats %	Votes %	Votes	+/−
Conservative	38	2	5	-3	61.3	35.3	69,825	▼6.6
Liberal Democrats	9	2	6	-4	14.5	16.0	31,683	▼13.9
Labour	7	2	1	+1	11.3	13.2	26,044	▲7.1
UKIP	4	4	0	+4	6.5	23.0	45,550	▲9.0
Independent	3	1	0	+1	4.8	5.6	11,148	▲1.0
Green	1	1	0	+1	1.6	6.5	12,785	▼0.3
Other parties	0	0	0	0	0.0	0.2	447	
Liberal	0	0	0	0	0.0	0.2	422	▼0.8
BNP	0	0	0	0	0.0	0.0	28	▼0.5

Note: seat changes reflect the council composition immediately before the election, taking into account the defection of the Liberal Democrat councillor for Exwick & St Thomas to the Labour Party, and the June 2012 defection of the Green Party councillor for Totnes Rural to the Labour Party.

== Election result by division ==
=== Alphington and Cowick ===
Alphington and Cowick
Party	Candidate	Votes	%
Labour	Roy Hill	1,291	34.9
Liberal Democrats	Vanessa Newcombe	976	26.4
UKIP	Dutch Dudgeon	750	20.3
Conservative	Louis Ten-Holter	499	13.5
Green	Diana Frances Moore	175	4.7
Majority		315	8.5
Turnout		3,695	32.5
Labour gain from Liberal Democrats			

=== Ashburton and Buckfastleigh ===
Ashburton and Buckfastleigh
Party	Candidate	Votes	%
Conservative	Stuart Denis Barker	1,314	36.6
UKIP	Alan Derek Whitton	734	20.4
Green	Anna Clarke	674	18.8
Labour	Michael Harriott	451	12.6
Liberal Democrats	John Nutley	408	11.4
Majority		580	16.2
Turnout		3,591	33.5
Conservative hold			

=== Axminster ===
Axminster
Party	Candidate	Votes	%
Conservative	Andrew T Moulding	1,741	47.1
Independent	Paul G Hayward	1,060	31.1
Liberal Democrats	Rob Jordan	302	8.9
Labour	Jerry Walden	219	6.4
Majority		740	21.7
Turnout		3,404	36.2
Conservative hold			

=== Barnstaple North ===
Barnstaple North
Party	Candidate	Votes	%
Liberal Democrats	Brian Carol Greenslade	959	30.5
Conservative	Simon Peter Harvey	672	21.4
UKIP	Michael Edward Pagram	603	19.2
Green	Ricky Knight	526	16.7
Labour	Mark Michael Robert Cann	262	8.3
Independent	Tom Prideaux	59	1.9
Communist	Gerrard Anthony Sables	53	1.7
Majority		287	9.1
Turnout		3,143	28.9
Liberal Democrats hold			

=== Barnstaple South ===
Barnstaple South
Party	Candidate	Votes	%
Conservative	John Vincent Mathews	955	31.6
Liberal Democrats	Chris Haywood	824	27.3
UKIP	Christopher Frederick William Turner	759	25.1
Labour	Geoff Moody	285	9.4
Green	Rosemary Haworth-Booth	184	6.1
Majority		131	4.3
Turnout		3,019	29.4
Conservative gain from Liberal Democrats			

=== Bickleigh and Wembury ===
Bickleigh and Wembury
Party	Candidate	Votes	%
Conservative	John Hart	1,691	59.6
UKIP	Hugh Martyn Williams	805	28.4
Liberal Democrats	Sue Bridgwater	315	11.1
Majority		886	31.2
Turnout		2,838	29.7
Conservative hold			

=== Bideford East ===
Bideford East
Party	Candidate	Votes	%
UKIP	Gaston Amedee Dezart	862	30.5
Conservative	Sam Robinson	827	29.3
Labour	David George Brenton	557	19.7
Liberal Democrats	Trevor John Johns	393	13.9
Green	John Paul Hextall	175	6.2
Majority		35	1.2
Turnout		2,824	26.9
UKIP gain from Conservative			

=== Bideford South and Hartland ===
Bideford South and Hartland
Party	Candidate	Votes	%
UKIP	Robin Julian	944	31.0
Conservative	Alison Jane Boyle	794	26.1
Independent	Adam James Symons	774	25.4
Labour	Anne Brenton	261	8.6
Liberal Democrats	Bob Wootton	138	4.5
Green	Colin David Jones	128	4.2
Majority		150	4.9
Turnout		3,045	31.4
UKIP gain from Conservative			

=== Bovey Tracey Rural ===
Bovey Tracey Rural
Party	Candidate	Votes	%
Conservative	George Gribble	1,658	46.9
UKIP	Bruce Andrew Meechan	781	22.1
Liberal Democrats	Sally Angela Morgan	506	14.3
Labour	Lisa Collette Robillard Webb	401	11.4
Green	Anna Murray Preece	182	5.2
Majority		877	24.8
Turnout		3,532	39.4
Conservative hold			

=== Braunton Rural ===
Braunton Rural
Party	Candidate	Votes	%
Conservative	Caroline Jean Chugg	1,073	36.1
UKIP	Stephen James Crowther	742	24.9
Liberal Democrats	Elizabeth Mary Spear	680	22.9
Labour	Valerie Jean Cann	305	10.3
Green	Jooley Fowles-Smith	165	5.5
Majority		331	11.1
Turnout		2,975	31.3
Conservative hold			

=== Broadclyst and Whimple ===
Broadclyst and Whimple
Party	Candidate	Votes	%
Conservative	Peter N Bowden	1,159	36.3
UKIP	Sylvia M Brownlee	691	21.6
Liberal Democrats	Derek G Button	652	20.4
Green	Henry F Gent	455	14.2
Labour	Gillian Nicholls	235	7.4
Majority		468	14.6
Turnout		3,195	34.6
Conservative hold			

=== Budleigh ===
Budleigh
Party	Candidate	Votes	%
Conservative	Christine Channon	1,373	42.2
UKIP	Graham A Hooker	939	28.8
Liberal Democrats	Lesley Miszewska	425	13.1
Green	Roger P Saunders	291	8.9
Labour	Tony Badcott	221	6.8
Majority		434	13.3
Turnout		3,255	37.4
Conservative hold			

=== Chudleigh Rural ===
Chudleigh Rural
Party	Candidate	Votes	%
Conservative	Jerry Brook	1,153	34.7
UKIP	Geoffrey Raymond Trezise	808	24.3
Independent	Stephen John Kinross Purser	509	15.3
Liberal Democrats	Stephen Barnes	308	9.3
Green	Patricia Langman	273	8.2
Labour	Chris Raybould-Gooding	266	8.0
Majority		345	10.4
Turnout		3,325	33.7
Conservative hold			

=== Chulmleigh and Swimbridge ===
Chulmleigh and Swimbridge
Party	Candidate	Votes	%
Conservative	Richard Colin Edgell	1,482	42.3
Liberal Democrats	David John Worden	846	24.1
UKIP	John Baglow	731	20.8
Green	Mark Haworth-Booth	228	6.5
Labour	Marion Elizabeth Mason	212	6.0
Majority		636	18.1
Turnout		3,507	36.9
Conservative hold			

=== Combe Martin Rural ===
Combe Martin Rural
Party	Candidate	Votes	%
Conservative	Andrea Vivienne Davis	1,452	52.6
UKIP	Andy Norden	718	26.0
Liberal Democrats	Rodney Hillman Hawes	274	9.9
Green	Scott Lawley Burrows	174	6.3
Labour	Heathcliffe Guy Pettifer	138	5.0
Majority		734	26.6
Turnout		2,762	33.3
Conservative hold			

=== Crediton Rural ===
Crediton Rural
Party	Candidate	Votes	%
Liberal Democrats	Nick Way	1,367	35.7
Conservative	Derek Roy Coren	1,336	34.9
UKIP	Mike Szabo	656	17.1
Labour	Lynne Richards	457	11.9
Majority		31	0.8
Turnout		3,828	38.4
Liberal Democrats hold			

=== Cullompton Rural ===
Cullompton Rural
Party	Candidate	Votes	%
Conservative	John Berry	1,422	44.7
UKIP	Lloyd Knight	653	20.5
Liberal	Jenny Roach	422	13.3
Liberal Democrats	Luke Daniel Taylor	315	9.9
Labour	Paul Jason Stone	241	7.6
Green	Colin Matthews	118	3.7
Majority		769	24.2
Turnout		3,180	30.2
Conservative hold			

=== Dartmouth and Kingswear ===
Dartmouth and Kingswear
Party	Candidate	Votes	%
Conservative	Jonathan Hawkins	1,170	46.4
Labour	Ben Cooper	675	26.8
UKIP	Martyn Brian Cocks	507	20.1
Liberal Democrats	Janice Claire Henshall	163	6.5
Majority		495	19.6
Turnout		2,522	35.6
Conservative hold			

=== Dawlish ===
Dawlish
Party	Candidate	Votes	%
Conservative	John Clatworthy	1,579	43.8
UKIP	Martin Heath	1,094	30.4
Labour	Bernard Mills	371	10.3
Liberal Democrats	Mike James	294	8.2
Green	Gilly Robinson	259	7.2
Majority		485	13.5
Turnout		3,602	32.4
Conservative hold			

=== Duryard and Pennsylvania ===
Duryard and Pennsylvania
Party	Candidate	Votes	%
Conservative	Percy Prowse	1,057	42.8
Labour	Hannah Packham	541	21.9
UKIP	Colin Stewart	361	14.6
Liberal Democrats	Kevin Martin Chun	288	11.7
Green	Chris Barnett	216	8.7
Majority		516	20.9
Turnout		2,469	26.8
Conservative hold			

=== Exminster and Kenton ===
Exminster and Kenton
Party	Candidate	Votes	%
Liberal Democrats	Alan Michael Connett	1,508	49.3
Conservative	Kevin Andrew Lake	930	30.4
UKIP	Elizabeth Mary Burton	355	11.6
Green	Andy Bragg	150	4.9
Labour	Paul David Bull	113	3.7
Majority		578	18.9
Turnout		3,061	41.6
Liberal Democrats hold			

=== Exmouth Brixington and Withycombe ===
Exmouth Brixington and Withycombe
Party	Candidate	Votes	%
UKIP	John A Hone	926	33.3
Liberal Democrats	Brenda O Taylor	742	26.7
Conservative	Jill Elson	690	24.8
Labour	Stuart Fegan	280	10.1
Green	Oliver Davey	138	5.0
Majority		184	6.6
Turnout		2,780	27.4
UKIP gain from Liberal Democrats			

=== Exmouth Halsdon and Woodbury ===
Exmouth Halsdon and Woodbury
Party	Candidate	Votes	%
Conservative	Bernard C Hughes	1,210	42.5
UKIP	Patrick C McAndrew	707	24.9
Liberal Democrats	Tim Dumper	642	22.6
Labour	Lesley Johnson	274	9.6
Majority		503	17.7
Turnout		2,845	32.5
Conservative hold			

=== Exmouth Littleham and Town ===
Exmouth Littleham and Town
Party	Candidate	Votes	%
Liberal Democrats	Eileen E Wragg	1,009	31.7
Conservative	John T Humphreys	934	29.3
UKIP	Ann Prior	795	24.9
Labour	Ray Davison	309	9.7
Green	Ben Jones	131	4.1
Majority		75	2.4
Turnout		3,187	30.7
Liberal Democrats hold			

=== Exwick and St. Thomas ===
Exwick and St. Thomas
Party	Candidate	Votes	%
Labour	Rob Hannaford	1,593	49.9
UKIP	Brian Jeffery	755	23.6
Conservative	Lizzie Roberts	340	10.6
Liberal Democrats	Sally Elizabeth Willcox	244	7.6
Green	Audaye Khalid Elesedy	147	4.6
Independent	Lee Matthew Gillett	110	3.4
Majority		838	26.2
Turnout		3,193	27.4
Labour hold			

=== Fremington Rural ===
Fremington Rural
Party	Candidate	Votes	%
Independent	Frank Biederman	1,526	45.6
Independent	Rodney Sheridan Cann	904	27.0
UKIP	Caroline Susan Crowther	514	15.4
Conservative	John Himan	203	6.1
No label	Joanne Bell	73	2.2
Labour	Danny James Neary	72	2.2
Green	Liz Wood	50	1.5
Majority		622	18.6
Turnout		3,346	39.0
Independent gain from Independent			

=== Hatherleigh and Chagford ===
Hatherleigh and Chagford
Party	Candidate	Votes	%
Conservative	James Raymond McInnes	1,981	49.9
UKIP	Alan Gross	1,195	30.1
Labour	Irene S Wareing	401	10.1
Green	William Douglas-Mann	383	9.6
Majority		786	19.8
Turnout		3,969	37.3
Conservative hold			

=== Heavitree and Whipton Barton ===
Heavitree and Whipton Barton
Party	Candidate	Votes	%
Labour	Olwen Foggin	1,655	48.1
Conservative	Peter Geoffrey Holland	803	23.3
UKIP	Richard Timmis	605	17.6
Liberal Democrats	Ditch Townsend	190	5.5
Green	Rouben Scott Freeman	186	5.4
Majority		852	24.7
Turnout		3,444	33.6
Labour hold			

=== Holsworthy Rural ===
Holsworthy Rural
Party	Candidate	Votes	%
Conservative	Barry Parsons	1,912	47.0
UKIP	Penny Mills	1,548	38.0
Green	Keith Stuart Funnell	203	5.0
Independent	Sandra Louise Willetts	201	4.9
Labour	Viv Gale	197	4.8
Majority		364	8.9
Turnout		4,069	38.7
Conservative hold			

=== Honiton St. Michael's ===
Honiton St. Michael's
Party	Candidate	Votes	%
Conservative	Sara M Randall Johnson	1,034	35.9
UKIP	Brian J Smith	798	27.7
Green	Sharon D Pavey	709	24.6
Labour	Michael J Teare	181	6.3
Liberal Democrats	Jonathan W Underwood	159	5.5
Majority		236	8.2
Turnout		2,883	32.4
Conservative hold			

=== Honiton St. Paul's ===
Honiton St. Paul's
Party	Candidate	Votes	%
Conservative	Paul A Diviani	1,130	38.3
UKIP	Peter C Townsend	790	26.8
Independent	Cathy Gardner	352	11.9
Labour	Sally Broom	317	10.7
Liberal Democrats	Paul Newman	176	6.0
Green	Martin R Paine	169	5.7
Majority		340	11.5
Turnout		2,953	32.5
Conservative hold			

=== Ilfracombe ===
Ilfracombe
Party	Candidate	Votes	%
Independent	Mike Edmunds	851	36.4
Conservative	Paul Edwards Crabb	747	31.9
UKIP	Alan Roy Whittle	482	20.6
Labour	Marianna Holdsworth	253	10.8
Majority		104	4.4
Turnout		2,339	25.2
Independent gain from Liberal Democrats			

=== Ivybridge ===
Ivybridge
Party	Candidate	Votes	%
Conservative	Roger Frederick Croad	1,028	40.6
UKIP	Edward James Lally	714	28.2
Green	Katie Anne Reville	601	23.7
Liberal Democrats	Jon May	185	7.3
Majority		314	12.4
Turnout		2,534	27.1
Conservative hold			

=== Kingsbridge and Stokenham ===
Kingsbridge and Stokenham
Party	Candidate	Votes	%
Liberal Democrats	Julian Charles Brazil	1,418	40.4
Conservative	Keith Robert Henry Wingate	1,153	32.8
UKIP	Joshua John Alexander Gardner	772	22.0
Labour	Louise Lewis	159	4.5
Majority		265	7.5
Turnout		3,513	42.9
Liberal Democrats hold			

=== Kingsteignton ===
Kingsteignton
Party	Candidate	Votes	%
UKIP	Tony Dempster	908	36.5
Conservative	Mike Walters	753	30.2
Liberal Democrats	Michael John Hocking	458	18.4
Labour	Robert Alexander Kennedy	286	11.5
Green	David Philip Bailey	78	3.1
Majority		155	6.2
Turnout		2,490	27.5
UKIP gain from Conservative			

=== Newton Abbot North ===
Newton Abbot North
Party	Candidate	Votes	%
Conservative	Eve Louise Barisic	700	28.3
Liberal Democrats	Jackie Brodie	620	25.1
UKIP	Will Forrow	500	20.2
Independent	Anne Fry	347	14.0
Labour	Mary Brenda Kennedy	211	8.5
Green	Julie Anne Boultby	87	3.5
Majority		80	3.2
Turnout		2,472	25.9
Conservative gain from Liberal Democrats			

=== Newton Abbot South ===
Newton Abbot South
Party	Candidate	Votes	%
Liberal Democrats	Gordon Nicholas Hook	1,450	47.4
Conservative	John Gadie	669	21.8
UKIP	Rod Peers	662	21.6
Labour	Paula Joan Black	268	8.8
Majority		781	25.5
Turnout		3,062	30.8
Liberal Democrats hold			

=== Newton St. Cyres and Sandford ===
Newton St. Cyres and Sandford
Party	Candidate	Votes	%
Conservative	Margaret Edith Squires	1,735	46.4
UKIP	Bob Edwards	855	22.9
Labour	Charlie Werner	591	15.8
Liberal Democrats	John Downes	308	8.2
Green	Keith Povey	246	6.6
Majority		880	23.5
Turnout		3,741	40.1
Conservative hold			

=== Newtown and Polsloe ===
Newtown and Polsloe
Party	Candidate	Votes	%
Labour	Richard Westlake	1,314	56.5
Conservative	Rob Newby	363	15.6
UKIP	Jacqueline Holdstock	297	12.8
Green	Tom Milburn	210	9.0
Liberal Democrats	Alan Williamson	106	4.6
TUSC	Carlos Hudson	29	1.2
Majority		951	40.9
Turnout		2,324	29.1
Labour hold			

=== Northam ===
Northam
Party	Candidate	Votes	%
Conservative	Andrew John Eastman	1,616	40.5
UKIP	Chris Leather	1,475	36.9
Green	Peter Graham Hames	329	8.2
Labour	James Andrew Craigie	303	7.6
Liberal Democrats	David Berryman	258	6.5
Majority		141	3.5
Turnout		3,992	39.4
Conservative hold			

=== Okehampton Rural ===
Okehampton Rural
Party	Candidate	Votes	%
Conservative	Kevin Ball	1,477	40.9
UKIP	Daniel Pledger	1,156	32.0
Labour	Terry Cummings	520	14.4
Liberal Democrats	Christopher John Bones	438	12.1
Majority		321	8.9
Turnout		3,607	31.8
Conservative hold			

=== Ottery St. Mary Rural ===
Ottery St. Mary Rural
Party	Candidate	Votes	%
Independent	Claire L Wright	2,970	74.1
Conservative	Chris Wale	522	13.0
UKIP	John Kelly	382	9.5
Labour	Andrew V Blackwell	124	3.1
Majority		2,448	61.1
Turnout		4,007	43.4
Independent hold			

=== Pinhoe and Mincinglake ===
Pinhoe and Mincinglake
Party	Candidate	Votes	%
Labour	Emma Morse	1,354	43.1
UKIP	Keith Crawford	809	25.7
Conservative	Cynthia Thompson	782	24.9
Liberal Democrats	John Robert Orm Ashton	97	3.1
Green	Isaac Micah Euan Price-Sosner	92	2.9
Majority		545	17.3
Turnout		3,142	34.1
Labour hold			

=== Priory and St. Leonard's ===
Priory and St. Leonard's
Party	Candidate	Votes	%
Labour	Andy Hannan	1,711	44.1
Conservative	Stephanie Warner	1,129	29.1
UKIP	Jacalyn Warwick	481	12.4
Green	Alison Harcourt	243	6.3
Liberal Democrats	Joel Mason	143	3.7
Your Decision To Keep Lights On	Nicola Guagliardo	133	3.4
BNP	Christopher Stone	28	0.7
Majority		582	15.0
Turnout		3,879	35.7
Labour hold			

=== Seaton Coastal ===
Seaton Coastal
Party	Candidate	Votes	%
Conservative	Jim Knight	1,312	38.8
UKIP	Warwick J Knowles	956	28.3
Liberal Democrats	Peter W Burrows	713	21.1
Labour	Stephen R Williams	372	11.0
Majority		356	10.5
Turnout		3,379	35.4
Labour hold			

=== Sidmouth Sidford ===
Sidmouth Sidford
Party	Candidate	Votes	%
Conservative	Stuart Hughes	1,923	47.2
UKIP	Lawrie Brownlee	1,505	36.9
Labour	Judy Blackwell	361	8.9
Liberal Democrats	Martin Gammell	278	6.8
Majority		418	10.3
Turnout		4,078	37.5
Conservative hold			

=== South Brent and Dartington ===
South Brent and Dartington
Party	Candidate	Votes	%
Conservative	Rosemary Rowe	1,114	34.1
Green	Jacqi Hodgson	940	28.8
UKIP	Ray Harrington	594	18.2
Labour	Tony Whitty	375	11.5
Liberal Democrats	David Allan Robinson	238	7.3
Majority		174	5.3
Turnout		3,267	36.7
Conservative hold			

=== South Molton ===
South Molton Rural
Party	Candidate	Votes	%
Conservative	Jeremy Owen Yabsley	1,419	42.8
Liberal Democrats	Matthew Thomas Bushell	933	28.2
UKIP	Brian David Hockin	696	21.0
Labour	Hilary Kathryn Greenfield	167	5.0
Green	L'Anne Knight	90	2.7
Majority		486	14.7
Turnout		3,314	34.9
Conservative hold			

=== St. Davids and St. James ===
St. Davids and St. James
Party	Candidate	Votes	%
Labour	Jill Owen	732	34.3
Liberal Democrats	Philip John Brock	671	31.4
Green	Andrew Wallace Bell	294	13.8
UKIP	Ralph Gay	207	9.7
Conservative	James Roberts	188	8.8
TUSC	Luke Christopher Pilling	34	1.6
Majority		61	2.9
Turnout		2,136	22.5
Labour gain from Liberal Democrats			

=== St. Loyes and Topsham ===
St. Loyes and Topsham
Party	Candidate	Votes	%
Conservative	Andrew Robert Leadbetter	1,487	49.8
Labour	Elliot Wright	731	24.5
UKIP	Valerie Angus	482	16.2
Green	Mark Stephen Cox	144	4.8
Liberal Democrats	Christine Vince	133	4.5
Majority		756	25.3
Turnout		2,983	31.0
Conservative hold			

=== Tavistock ===
Tavistock
Party	Candidate	Votes	%
Conservative	Debo Sellis	1,544	40.7
UKIP	George Edward Mudge	804	21.2
Liberal Democrats	Alison Clish-Green	795	20.9
Labour	Moira Brown	392	10.3
Green	Judy Sara Maciejowska	249	6.6
Majority		740	19.5
Turnout		3,796	34.1
Conservative hold			

=== Teign Estuary ===
Teign Estuary
Party	Candidate	Votes	%
Conservative	Christopher Stuart Clarance	1,178	37.2
Liberal Democrats	David Nicholas Cox	1,121	35.4
UKIP	Richard Stanton	613	19.4
Labour	Anthony Ronald Randall	252	8.0
Majority		57	1.8
Turnout		3,166	35.9
Conservative hold			

=== Teignbridge South ===
Teignbridge South
Party	Candidate	Votes	%
Liberal Democrats	Alistair Dewhirst	1,396	41.3
Conservative	Dennis Esmond Smith	1,001	29.6
UKIP	Sue Doidge	683	20.2
Labour	Jacqueline Anne Stewart	161	4.8
Green	Keith Clements	139	4.1
Majority		395	11.7
Turnout		3,383	37.1
Liberal Democrats gain from Conservative			

=== Teignmouth ===
Teignmouth
Party	Candidate	Votes	%
Liberal Democrats	Richard Younger-Ross	1,185	37.2
Conservative	James Robert McMurray	913	28.7
UKIP	Mike Smith	749	23.5
Labour	Niall Thomas Duffy	248	7.8
TUSC	Sean Brogan	78	2.5
Majority		272	8.5
Turnout		3,182	39.4
Liberal Democrats gain from Conservative			

=== Thurlestone, Salcombe and Allington ===
Thurlestone, Salcombe and Allington
Party	Candidate	Votes	%
Conservative	Rufus Gilbert	1,447	47.8
UKIP	Dennis Hobday	1,009	33.3
Labour	Michael Connelly	196	6.5
Liberal Democrats	Laurel Lawford	195	6.4
Green	Daniel Forster	174	5.7
Majority		438	14.5
Turnout		3,028	38.9
Conservative hold			

=== Tiverton East ===
Tiverton East
Party	Candidate	Votes	%
Liberal Democrats	Des Hannon	1,093	37.4
Conservative	Neal Vincent Davey	726	24.8
UKIP	George Birch	644	22.0
Labour	Christopher James Chesney	272	9.3
Green	Robert Harper Rickey	138	4.7
TUSC	Steve Bush	47	1.6
Majority		367	12.5
Turnout		2,926	28.7
Liberal Democrats hold			

=== Tiverton West ===
Tiverton West
Party	Candidate	Votes	%
Conservative	Polly Colthorpe	1,032	35.4
UKIP	Tony McIntyre	798	27.4
Labour	Anne Kilshaw	366	12.6
Liberal Democrats	Henry George Edwin Oliver	263	9.0
Independent	Steve Flaws	188	6.5
Independent	Clive McIntyre	139	4.8
Green	Catherine Povey	120	4.1
Majority		234	8.0
Turnout		2,913	29.5
Conservative hold			

=== Torrington Rural ===
Torrington Rural
Party	Candidate	Votes	%
Conservative	Andy Boyd	1,284	38.4
UKIP	James Conabere	955	28.6
Liberal Democrats	Adrian Stuart Freeland	531	15.9
Green	Catherine Hannah Simmons	299	8.9
Labour	Gillian Tesh	264	7.9
Majority		329	9.8
Turnout		3,341	31.1
Conservative hold			

=== Totnes Rural ===
Totnes Rural
Party	Candidate	Votes	%
Green	Robert Vint	984	31.9
Conservative	Colin Edward Hair	761	24.7
Labour	Carole Whitty	581	18.9
UKIP	Ian Campbell Keir	462	15.0
Liberal Democrats	Andrew Bridgwater	290	9.4
Majority		223	7.2
Turnout		3,082	35.8
Green hold			

=== Willand and Uffculme ===
Willand and Uffculme
Party	Candidate	Votes	%
Conservative	Ray Radford	1,243	39.1
UKIP	David Ewart Graham	759	23.9
Independent	David Follett Pugsley	499	15.7
Labour	Jocelyn Anne Pritchard	325	10.2
Liberal Democrats	Richard John Foord	172	5.4
Green	Hugh Meller	168	5.3
Majority		484	15.2
Turnout		3,175	30.7
Conservative hold			

=== Yealmpton ===
Yealmpton
Party	Candidate	Votes	%
Conservative	Will Mumford	1,655	51.1
UKIP	Stuart Edward Munnery	611	18.9
Liberal Democrats	Brian Samuel Blake	574	17.7
Green	Janet Elsie Chapman	388	12.0
Majority		1,044	32.2
Turnout		3,240	35.8
Conservative hold			

=== Yelverton Rural ===
Yelverton Rural
Party	Candidate	Votes	%
Conservative	Philip Richard Sanders	1,291	37.6
UKIP	Andrew George James Mudge	963	28.0
Liberal Democrats	Gail Bones	518	15.1
Labour	Samantha Louise Loveridge	374	10.9
Green	Lynton Jon Wells North	283	8.2
Majority		328	9.5
Turnout		3,436	33.5
Conservative hold			
