= 2001 Devon County Council election =

Local election in Devon

- 7 June 2001

All 54 seats to Devon County Council 28 seats needed for a majority
- Registered: 539,622
- Turnout: 372,985 (69.1%)
	First party	Second party	Third party
Party	Conservative	Liberal Democrats	Labour
Seats won	22	21	5
Seat change	▲8	▼8	▲1
Popular vote	139,365	133,524	62,315
	Fourth party	Fifth party
Party	Independent	Liberal
Seats won	4	2
Seat change	▼1	Steady
Popular vote	22,839	7,342

Elections to Devon County Council were held on 7 June 2001, alongside other local elections across the United Kingdom. All 54 seats were up for election. The Liberal Democrats lost the council to no overall control.

== Results ==
The Conservative party won a plurality of seats with 22, ahead of the Liberal Democrats on 21 seats.

2001 Devon County Council election
Party	Seats	Gains	Losses	Net gain/loss	Seats %	Votes %	Votes	+/−
Conservative	22	9	1	+8			139,365	
Liberal Democrats	21	1	9	-8			133,524	
Labour	5	1	0	+1			62,315	
Independent	4	0	1	-1			22,839	
Liberal	2	0	0	0			7,342	
Total	54						539,622	

== See also ==
- Devon County Council elections
