= 2025 Devon County Council election =

2025 English local election

- 1 May 2025

All 60 seats to Devon County Council 31 seats needed for a majority
- Registered: 640,785
- Turnout: 231,027; 36.05% (▼4.6 pp)
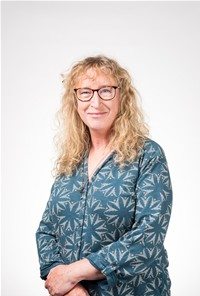

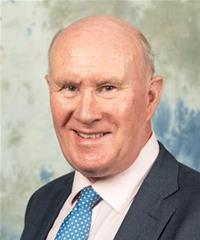

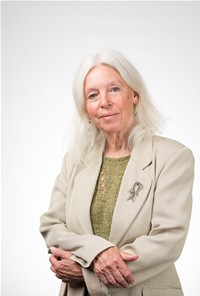

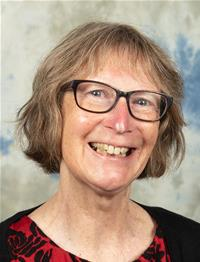
	First party	Second party	Third party
Leader	Caroline Leaver		James McInnes
Party	Liberal Democrats	Reform	Conservative
Leader's seat	Barnstaple South		Hatherleigh & Chagford (retired)
Last election	9 seats, 17.93%	0 seats, 0.2%	39 seats, 42.55%
Seats before	10	0	40
Seats won	27	18	7
Seat change	▲18	▲18	▼32
Popular vote	68,823	64,446	53,023
Percentage	28.33%	26.53%	21.83%
Swing	▲10.4%	▲26.3%	▼20.72%
	Fourth party	Fifth party	Sixth party
Leader	Jacqi Hodgson	N/A	Carol Whitton
Party	Green	Independent	Labour
Leader's seat	Totnes & Dartington		St David's & Haven Banks (defeated)
Last election	2 seats, 11.17%	3 seats, 10.8%	7 seats, 16.05%
Seats before	2	2	6
Seats won	6	2	0
Seat change	▲4	▼1	▼7
Popular vote	25,954	11,154	19,020
Percentage	10.68%	4.8%	7.83%
Swing	▼0.49%	▼3.8%	▼8.22%
Leader before election
James McInnes
Conservative
Leader after election
Julian Brazil
Liberal Democrat
No overall control

The 2025 Devon County Council election took place on 1 May 2025 to elect members to Devon County Council in Devon, England. All 60 seats were up for election. This was on the same day as other local elections. The council was under Conservative majority control prior to the election. The council went under no overall control at the election, with the Liberal Democrats becoming the largest party.

== Background ==
At the 2021 election, the Conservatives won an outright majority of seats. The party had held control of the council since 2009. The council was led by Conservative councillor James McInnes prior to the election; he did not stand for re-election in 2025.

== Previous council composition ==
After 2021 election		Before 2025 election	
Party	Seats	Party	Seats
Conservative	39	Conservative	40
Liberal Democrats	9	Liberal Democrats	10
Labour	7	Labour	6
Green	2	Green	2
Independent	3	Independent	2

=== Changes 2021–2025 ===
- November 2023: Rob Hannaford (Labour) suspended from party
- June 2024: Rob Hannaford (independent) joins Liberal Democrats
- July 2024: Rob Hannaford (Liberal Democrats) leaves party to sit as an independent
- February 2025: Frank Biederman (independent) joins Liberal Democrats; Rob Hannaford (independent) joins Conservatives

== Councillors standing down ==
28 Councillors did not stand for re-election.

Councillor	Ward	First elected	Party	References
John Hart	Bickleigh and Wembury	2009	Conservative	

== Summary ==
Following the election the council was under no overall control, with the Liberal Democrats the largest party. The Liberal Democrats changed their group leader immediately after the election, with Julian Brazil replacing Caroline Leaver. Julian Brazil was then formally appointed as the new leader of the council at the subsequent annual council meeting on 22 May 2025. The Liberal Democrats took nine of the ten seats on the council's cabinet, and the other place was taken by the Green Party.

Reform UK had no seats on the council prior to the election. They won 18 seats at the election, making them the second largest party on the council. They chose Michael Fife Cook as their new group leader.

2025 Devon County Council election
Party	Candidates	Seats	Gains	Losses	Net gain/loss	Seats %	Votes %	Votes	+/−
Liberal Democrats	60	27	18	0	▲18	45.0	28.6	66,639	+10.7
Reform	60	18	18	0	▲18	30.0	26.8	62,332	+26.6
Conservative	60	7	0	32	▼32	11.7	21.5	50,092	-21.3
Green	55	6	4	0	▲4	10.0	10.2	23,833	-0.9
Labour	60	0	0	7	▼7	0.0	7.8	18,216	-8.2
Independent	19	2	0	1	▼1	3.3	4.8	11,154	-3.8
TUSC	4	0	0	0	Steady	0.0	0.1	200	-0.2
Heritage	7	0	0	0	Steady	0.0	0.1	189	N/A
Liberal	1	0	0	0	Steady	0.0	0.0	92	N/A
Communist	1	0	0	0	Steady	0.0	0.0	13	N/A

== Results by district ==
Candidates marked with an asterisk (*) indicate an incumbent councillor.

=== East Devon ===
==== District summary ====
East Devon district summary
Party	Seats	+/-	Votes	%	+/-
Liberal Democrats	5	▲5	12,663	26.6	+17.7
Reform UK	2	▲2	11,876	25.0	+25.0
Conservative	1	▼8	10,758	22.6	–23.4
Independent	2	▲1	6,857	14.4	+2.5
Green	1	Steady	3,452	7.3	–0.7
Labour	0	Steady	1,890	4.0	–9.8
Heritage	0	Steady	57	0.1	N/A
Total	11	Steady	57,703		

==== Division results ====
Axminster
Party	Candidate	Votes	%	±%
Independent	Paul Graham Hayward	1,393	37.5	−0.1
Reform	Philip James Salway	993	26.8	N/A
Conservative	Jenny Brown	600	16.2	–27.4
Liberal Democrats	Sue Robinson	424	11.4	+5.9
Green	Matthew Denis Byrne	160	4.3	N/A
Labour Co-op	Honey Barlow Marshall	137	3.7	–9.3
Majority		400	10.8	N/A
Turnout		3,712	35.7	–3.0
Registered electors		10,397		
Independent gain from Conservative		Swing	+13.5	

Broadclyst (2 seats)
Party	Candidate	Votes	%	±%
Green	Henry Gent*	1,475	31.9	−13.6
Reform	Nat Vanstone	1,283	27.7	N/A
Reform	Fernando Gundin	1,268	27.4	N/A
Liberal Democrats	Eleanor Rylance	1,179	25.5	+5.1
Conservative	Brian Arthur Bailey	834	18.0	−20.1
Liberal Democrats	Andrea Glover	758	16.4	N/A
Conservative	Cynthia Thompson	756	16.3	−17.6
Green	Kate Jago	668	14.4	N/A
Labour	Molly Jane Holmes	309	6.7	−7.0
Labour	Kian Healy	282	6.1	−6.9
Heritage	Lisa Goudie	35	0.8	N/A
Turnout		4,632	26.7	–5.3
Registered electors		17,363		
Green hold		Swing		
Reform gain from Conservative		Swing		

Exmouth (2 seats)
Party	Candidate	Votes	%	±%
Reform	Helen Brown	2,601	30.2	N/A
Conservative	Jeff Trail*	2,320	26.9	−17.2
Reform	Si Fermor	2,299	26.7	N/A
Conservative	Richard Scott*	2,175	25.2	−18.4
Liberal Democrats	Matt Hall	2,108	24.5	+2.7
Independent	Daniel Wilson	1,645	19.1	N/A
Liberal Democrats	Fran McElhone	1,426	16.5	N/A
Green	Lou Doliczny	1,070	12.4	−2.0
Labour Co-op	Hilary Anne Ackland	570	6.6	−11.3
Labour	Ben Anthony Hawkes	522	6.1	−8.4
Registered electors		26,649		
Turnout		8,626	32.4	–0.5
Reform gain from Conservative		Swing		
Conservative hold		Swing		

Exmouth and Budleigh Salterton Coastal
Party	Candidate	Votes	%	±%
Liberal Democrats	Nick Hookway	1,518	31.7	+15.8
Conservative	Henry Lloyd Riddell	1,394	29.1	–20.1
Reform	Paul Thomas	1,169	24.4	+22.7
Labour	James Declan McIntosh	365	7.6	–2.6
Green	Mike Rosser	338	7.1	–3.6
Majority		124	2.6	N/A
Turnout		4,793	37.9	–0.8
Registered electors		12,635		
Liberal Democrats gain from Conservative		Swing	+17.9%	

Feniton and Honiton
Party	Candidate	Votes	%	±%
Liberal Democrats	Richard Jefferies	1,478	36.0	+27.8
Reform	Barry Alcock	1,121	27.3	N/A
Conservative	Phil Twiss*	1,078	26.3	–27.0
Green	Jane Collins	142	3.5	N/A
Independent	Peter Hamilton Faithfull	100	2.4	N/A
Labour	Steve Casemore	88	2.1	–35.8
Independent	Jo Fotheringham	84	2.0	N/A
Majority		357	8.7	N/A
Turnout		4,101	33.6	–0.5
Registered electors		12,223		
Liberal Democrats gain from Conservative		Swing		

Otter Valley
Party	Candidate	Votes	%	±%
Independent	Jess Bailey*	2,997	63.3	–1.9
Reform	Janice Aherne	983	20.7	N/A
Conservative	Paul Richard Carter	486	10.3	–15.6
Liberal Democrats	Beth Collins	197	4.2	+2.6
Labour	Rachel Helen Sutton	70	1.5	–1.2
Majority		2,014	42.6	+3.3
Turnout		4,738	40.1	–3.4
Registered electors		11,804		
Independent hold		Swing		

Seaton and Colyton
Party	Candidate	Votes	%	±%
Liberal Democrats	Paul Arnott	2,015	40.6	+37.5
Reform	Jim Walsh	1,308	26.3	N/A
Conservative	Ben Ingham	881	17.7	–27.0
Independent	John David Heath	638	12.8	N/A
Labour	Paul Graeme Knott	106	2.1	–3.8
Majority		707	14.3	N/A
Turnout		4,966	40.3	–2.2
Registered electors		12,309		
Liberal Democrats gain from Conservative		Swing		

Sidmouth
Party	Candidate	Votes	%	±%
Liberal Democrats	Denise Bickley	2,392	43.2	N/A
Conservative	Stuart Hughes*	1,911	34.5	–14.9
Reform	Basil Thomas Herbert	1,093	19.8	N/A
Labour	Suzanne Mary Bullock	115	2.1	–1.9
Majority		481	8.7	N/A
Turnout		5,532	44.9	+2.1
Registered electors		12,325		
Liberal Democrats gain from Conservative		Swing		

Whimple and Blackdown
Party	Candidate	Votes	%	±%
Liberal Democrats	Cathy Connor	1,352	31.0	+15.4
Reform	Dave Willey	1,325	30.4	N/A
Conservative	Iain Chubb	1,254	28.8	–28.6
Green	Steve Owen	267	6.1	–5.7
Labour	Johann Malawana	130	3.0	–11.1
Heritage	Andre Sabine	22	0.5	N/A
Majority		27	0.6	N/A
Turnout		4,357	38.4	–1.5
Registered electors		11,346		
Liberal Democrats gain from Conservative		Swing		

=== Exeter ===
Despite topping the polls in Exeter, Labour lost all of its seats.

==== District summary ====
Exeter district summary
Party	Seats	+/-	Votes	%	+/-
Labour	0	▼7	8,858	27.3	–15.3
Reform UK	4	▲4	7,779	24.0	N/A
Green	3	▲3	6,492	20.0	+3.6
Conservative	1	▼1	5,071	15.6	–16.4
Liberal Democrats	1	▲1	4,217	13.0	+5.9
TUSC	0	Steady	38	0.1	N/A
Total	9	Steady	32,455		

==== Division results ====
Alphington and Cowick
Party	Candidate	Votes	%	±%
Reform	Neil Stevens	1,126	26.7	N/A
Labour Co-op	Yvonne Atkinson*	1,054	25.0	–16.8
Liberal Democrats	Vanessa Newcombe	1,030	24.4	+14.1
Green	Holly Gillett	544	12.9	+2.1
Conservative	Lucille Baker	452	10.7	–25.6
Majority		72	1.7	N/A
Turnout		4,215	38.6	–3.6
Registered electors		10,926		
Reform gain from Labour		Swing		

Duryard and Pennsylvania
Party	Candidate	Votes	%	±%
Liberal Democrats	Michael Norman Mitchell	886	28.4	+13.5
Labour Co-op	Tony Badcott	815	26.1	–6.5
Reform	James Donald Holman	502	16.1	N/A
Conservative	Rob Hannaford*	470	15.1	–22.1
Green	Bernadette Chelvanayagam	445	14.3	+2.8
Majority		71	2.3	N/A
Turnout		3,122	40.0	–4.5
Registered electors		7,797		
Liberal Democrats gain from Conservative		Swing		

Exwick and St Thomas
Party	Candidate	Votes	%	±%
Reform	Tony Stevens	1,040	32.1	N/A
Labour Co-op	John Harvey	1,018	31.5	–19.8
Green	Andy Cooper	571	17.6	+4.6
Liberal Democrats	Jamie Liam Horner	329	10.2	+5.7
Conservative	Kayleigh Michelle Suzanne Luscombe	274	8.5	–17.2
Majority		22	0.7	N/A
Turnout		3,236	32.0	–3.4
Reform gain from Labour		Swing		

Heavitree and Whipton Barton
Party	Candidate	Votes	%	±%
Green	Jack Stanley Eade	1,070	26.1	+4.3
Reform	Tina Beer	1,045	25.5	N/A
Labour Co-op	Liz Pole	1,037	25.3	–18.9
Conservative	Katherine Helen New	474	11.6	–17.5
Liberal Democrats	Paul Stephen Richards	459	11.2	+7.6
Majority		25	0.6	N/A
Turnout		4,101	38.3	–2.2
Registered electors		10,700		
Green gain from Labour		Swing		

Pinhoe and Mincinglake
Party	Candidate	Votes	%	±%
Reform	Edward Clive Andrew Hill	1,313	33.9	N/A
Labour Co-op	Paula Joan Black	1,115	28.8	–19.5
Conservative	Ian Anthony Baldwin	631	16.3	–16.9
Green	Martin Ayres	424	11.0	+3.9
Liberal Democrats	Christine Anne Campion	370	9.6	+5.8
Majority		198	5.1	N/A
Turnout		3,868	33.9	–4.8
Registered electors		11,399		
Reform gain from Labour		Swing		

St David's and Haven Banks
Party	Candidate	Votes	%	±%
Green	Andy Ketchin	1,486	45.7	+8.9
Labour Co-op	Rose Lelliot	777	23.9	–17.3
Reform	Fran Wroe	484	14.9	N/A
Conservative	Rob Newby	260	8.0	–9.7
Liberal Democrats	Rod Ruffle	197	6.1	+1.9
TUSC	Myles Jefferson Hatcher	38	1.2	N/A
Majority		709	21.9	N/A
Turnout		3,253	33.6	
Registered electors		9,692		
Green gain from Labour		Swing		

St Sidwell's and St James
Party	Candidate	Votes	%	±%
Green	Thomas Morgan Richardson	1,049	35.8	+13.5
Labour Co-op	Lucy Findlay	981	33.5	–18.6
Reform	Jo Westlake	403	13.8	N/A
Liberal Democrats	Will Aczel	298	10.2	–1.6
Conservative	David Luscombe	188	6.4	–7.3
Majority		68	2.3	N/A
Turnout		2,929	29.7	–2.4
Registered electors		9,847		
Green gain from Labour		Swing		

Wearside and Topsham
Party	Candidate	Votes	%	±%
Conservative	Andrew Robert Leadbetter*	1,479	31.4	–16.9
Labour	Carol Whitton	1,276	27.1	–3.8
Reform	Chris Owen	916	19.5	N/A
Green	Rosie Green	609	12.9	–1.1
Liberal Democrats	Philip Alexander Thomas	417	8.9	+2.1
Majority		203	4.3	–13.0
Turnout		4,705	41.7	
Registered electors		11,291		
Conservative hold		Swing		

Wonford and St Loye's
Party	Candidate	Votes	%	±%
Reform	Angela Nash	950	30.5	N/A
Conservative	Anne Margaret Jobson	843	27.1	–15.9
Labour	Dave Mutton	785	25.2	–18.4
Green	Johanna Franziska Korndorfer	294	9.5	+0.1
Liberal Democrats	Adrian Lock	231	7.4	+3.4
Majority		107	3.4	N/A
Turnout		3,111	32.6	–2.5
Registered electors		9,548		
Reform gain from Labour		Swing		

=== Mid Devon ===
==== District summary ====
Mid Devon district summary
Party	Seats	+/-	Votes	%	+/-
Liberal Democrats	5	▲4	8,368	36.5	+15.8
Reform UK	1	▲1	6,650	29.0	N/A
Conservative	0	▼5	4,763	20.8	–28.6
Labour	0	Steady	1,457	6.4	–7.6
Green	0	Steady	1,224	5.3	–7.4
Independent	0	Steady	391	1.7	–0.9
Heritage	0	Steady	52	0.2	N/A
Communist	0	Steady	13	0.1	N/A
Total	6	Steady	22,918		

==== Division results ====
Crediton
Party	Candidate	Votes	%	±%
Liberal Democrats	Jim Cairney	1,259	35.5	–8.5
Reform	Charles Errington Beazley	869	24.5	N/A
Conservative	Angus Howie	602	17.0	–22.9
Labour	Paul Michael Vincent	423	11.9	–1.3
Green	Robert Harper Rickey	333	9.4	N/A
Heritage	Wesley Mitchell	52	1.5	N/A
Majority		390	11.0	+7.0
Turnout		3,543	33.2	–6.2
Registered electors		10,666		
Liberal Democrats hold		Swing		

Creedy Taw and Mid Exe
Party	Candidate	Votes	%	±%
Liberal Democrats	Steve Keable	1,652	35.6	+20.4
Reform	Andy Hankins	1,249	26.9	N/A
Conservative	Polly Colthorpe	1,148	24.8	–29.6
Labour	John William Dean	572	12.3	+3.0
Majority		403	8.7	N/A
Turnout		4,636	41.3	–5.2
Registered electors		11,226		
Liberal Democrats gain from Conservative		Swing		

Cullompton and Bradninch
Party	Candidate	Votes	%	±%
Liberal Democrats	James Timothy Buczkowski	1,531	42.3	+20.5
Reform	Barry Victor Myers	989	27.3	N/A
Conservative	Richard James Chesterton	780	21.5	–31.5
Green	Helen Marie Bottrill	199	5.5	–7.3
Labour	Piers Martin Kotting	117	3.2	–8.5
Majority		542	15.0	N/A
Turnout		3,620	33.8	
Registered electors		10,719		
Liberal Democrats gain from Conservative		Swing		

Tiverton East
Party	Candidate	Votes	%	±%
Reform	Neale Stephen Peter Raleigh	1,121	33.8	N/A
Liberal Democrats	Jane Lock	980	29.6	+6.3
Conservative	Colin Robert Slade*	739	22.3	–24.7
Green	Gill Westcott	200	6.0	N/A
Independent	Chris Berry	154	4.6	N/A
Labour	Jason Chamberlain	101	3.0	–16.5
Communist	Caio Whitmore	13	0.4	N/A
Majority		141	4.3	N/A
Turnout		3,312	32.4	+8.7
Registered electors		10,232		
Reform gain from Conservative		Swing		

Tiverton West
Party	Candidate	Votes	%	±%
Liberal Democrats	Steve Lodge	1,372	35.6	N/A
Reform	Richard Peter Ross Bullivant	1,228	31.9	N/A
Conservative	Toby William Gray	738	19.2	–26.4
Independent	Tim Bridger	237	6.2	N/A
Green	Simon Mark Tempest Brown	162	4.2	–21.9
Labour	Jeffrey Lee Pocock	107	2.8	–17.3
Majority		144	3.7	N/A
Turnout		3,851	34.0	–4.1
Registered electors		11,328		
Liberal Democrats gain from Conservative		Swing		

Willand and Uffculme
Party	Candidate	Votes	%	±%
Liberal Democrats	Simon Clist	1,574	39.4	+17.8
Reform	Clare Louise Berry	1,194	29.9	N/A
Conservative	Paul Andrew Osman	756	18.9	–32.8
Green	Laura Buchanan	330	8.3	–5.3
Labour	Terry Edwards	137	3.4	–7.1
Majority		380	9.5	N/A
Turnout		3,998	36.3	–1.6
Registered electors		11,022		
Liberal Democrats gain from Conservative		Swing		

=== North Devon ===
==== District summary ====
North Devon district summary
Party	Seats	+/-	Votes	%	+/-
Liberal Democrats	5	▲3	9,878	35.8	+13.2
Reform UK	1	▲1	7,456	27.0	N/A
Conservative	1	▼4	6,680	24.2	–17.5
Green	1	▲1	2,618	9.5	–3.5
Labour	0	Steady	900	3.3	–4.2
Independent	0	▼1	47	0.2	–13.4
Total	8	Steady	27,579		

==== Division results ====
Barnstaple North
Party	Candidate	Votes	%	±%
Liberal Democrats	Syed Jusef	1,433	45.6	+1.5
Reform	David Ian Jarvis	985	31.3	N/A
Conservative	Lisa Jayne MacKenzie	324	10.3	–11.5
Green	Howard Porter	247	7.9	–16.7
Labour	Helen Mary Marini	149	4.7	–2.0
Majority		448	14.3	–5.2
Turnout		3,142	29.5	–2.9
Registered electors		10,655		
Liberal Democrats hold		Swing		

Barnstaple South
Party	Candidate	Votes	%	±%
Liberal Democrats	Caroline Leaver*	1,348	42.6	+1.5
Reform	Anthony John Payne	846	26.8	N/A
Conservative	David William Hoare	633	20.0	–14.8
Green	Rosie Haworth-Booth	181	5.7	–1.5
Labour	Rhys Daniel Jones	130	4.1	–1.7
Independent	Nigel Andrew Johnson	19	0.6	N/A
Majority		502	15.9	+9.6
Turnout		3,162	30.6	–3.4
Registered electors		10,318		
Liberal Democrats hold		Swing		

Braunton Rural
Party	Candidate	Votes	%	±%
Liberal Democrats	Graham Matthew Bell	1,310	37.9	+9.2
Conservative	Pru Maskell*	1,194	34.6	–7.8
Reform	Richard Booth	623	18.0	N/A
Green	David Charles John Relph	185	5.4	–7.3
Labour	Tamsin Higgs	132	3.8	–10.1
Majority		116	3.4	N/A
Turnout		3,452	36.3	–1.2
Registered electors		9,501		
Liberal Democrats gain from Conservative		Swing		

Chulmleigh and Landkey
Party	Candidate	Votes	%	±%
Liberal Democrats	Ed Tyldesley	1,262	38.4	+25.7
Reform	Casey Ryback	866	26.3	N/A
Conservative	Glyn Lane	811	24.7	–20.3
Green	David James Smale	257	7.8	–5.4
Labour	Valerie Jean Cann	58	1.8	–4.3
Independent	Faye Marion Davies	28	0.9	N/A
Majority		396	12.1	N/A
Turnout		3,289	37.8	–3.7
Registered electors		8,692		
Liberal Democrats gain from Conservative		Swing		

Combe Martin Rural
Party	Candidate	Votes	%	±%
Conservative	Andrea Vivienne Davis*	1,365	39.1	–23.7
Reform	Kelvin Leigh McKechnie	1,038	29.8	N/A
Liberal Democrats	Josh Rutty	641	18.4	+4.3
Green	Kyle James Chivers	313	9.0	–2.6
Labour	Oliver John Leslie Bell	123	3.5	–4.9
Majority		327	9.4	–39.3
Turnout		3,488	35.3	–4.9
Registered electors		9,893		
Conservative hold		Swing		

Fremington Rural
Party	Candidate	Votes	%	±%
Liberal Democrats	Frank Lindsay Biederman*	2,284	59.0	+51.4
Reform	Lawrie Jenner	1,038	26.8	N/A
Conservative	Gary Lionel Beglin	362	9.4	–10.0
Green	Ricky Knight	146	3.8	+0.2
Labour	Gemma Lorraine Rolstone	37	1.0	–2.7
Majority		1,246	32.2	N/A
Turnout		3,871	37.1	+3.2
Registered electors		10,437		
Liberal Democrats gain from Independent		Swing		

Note: Frank Lindsay Biederman was previously elected as an independent with 64.6%. Changes are shown from the Liberal Democrat performance at the previous election.

Ilfracombe
Party	Candidate	Votes	%	±%
Green	Sara Jane Wilson	1,040	34.1	+4.8
Reform	Adrian John Emery	762	25.0	N/A
Conservative	Paul Edward Crabb*	728	23.9	–27.2
Liberal Democrats	June Williams	458	15.0	+5.2
Labour	Toby Ebert	56	1.8	–5.6
Majority		278	9.3	N/A
Turnout		3,048	34.9	+1.7
Green gain from Conservative		Swing		

South Molton
Party	Candidate	Votes	%	±%
Reform	Richard Leonard Alan Hopley	1,298	31.1	N/A
Conservative	Paul John Henderson	1,263	30.3	–23.8
Liberal Democrats	David John Worden	1,142	27.4	+4.2
Green	Gill Saunders	249	6.0	–0.9
Labour	Steven William Hinchliffe	215	5.2	–2.5
Majority		35	0.8	N/A
Turnout		4,174	37.4	–0.1
Registered electors		11,170		
Reform gain from Conservative		Swing		

=== South Hams ===
==== District summary ====
South Hams district summary
Party	Seats	+/-	Votes	%	+/-
Liberal Democrats	5	▲3	9,621	35.8	+11.8
Conservative	1	▼3	6,332	23.6	–23.1
Reform UK	0	Steady	6,162	22.9	+22.6
Green	1	Steady	3,346	12.5	–1.2
Labour	0	Steady	1,108	4.1	–8.8
Independent	0	Steady	197	0.7	N/A
TUSC	0	Steady	89	0.3	±0.0
Heritage	0	Steady	20	0.1	N/A
Total	7	Steady	26,875		

==== Division results ====
Bickleigh and Wembury
Party	Candidate	Votes	%	±%
Conservative	Tony Carson	1,289	35.0	–28.9
Reform	Peter Gold	1,258	34.2	N/A
Liberal Democrats	Laurel Lawford	798	21.7	+12.6
Labour	Denis Parsons	329	8.9	–4.9
Majority		31	0.8	–49.7
Turnout		3,682	33.4	–5.2
Registered electors		11,034		
Conservative hold		Swing		

Dartmouth and Marldon
Party	Candidate	Votes	%	±%
Liberal Democrats	Simon John Rake	1,234	34.1	+16.0
Conservative	Jonathan Hawkins*	1,117	30.9	–30.0
Reform	Lucina Ellicott	959	26.5	+24.1
Green	Jack Edward Neil Garner	203	5.6	N/A
Labour	Colin Chapman	99	2.7	–11.4
Majority		117	3.2	N/A
Turnout		3,619	38.5	–1.8
Registered electors		9,402		
Liberal Democrats gain from Conservative		Swing		

Ivybridge
Party	Candidate	Votes	%	±%
Liberal Democrats	Victor James Abbott	1,210	38.3	+14.2
Reform	Andy Dennett	876	27.7	N/A
Conservative	Lance Peter Austen	579	18.3	–37.5
Independent	Alan Charles Spencer	197	6.2	N/A
Green	Andrew Robert Pratt	113	3.6	N/A
Labour	Susan Louise Clarke	90	2.8	–14.7
TUSC	Tony Rea	89	2.8	N/A
Majority		334	10.6	N/A
Turnout		3,159	32.7	–5.1
Registered electors		9,661		
Liberal Democrats gain from Conservative		Swing		

Kingsbridge
Party	Candidate	Votes	%	±%
Liberal Democrats	Julian Brazil*	2,040	48.7	–3.8
Reform	Goncalo de Sousa	1,018	24.3	N/A
Conservative	Helena Penfold	695	16.6	–18.5
Green	Anna Presswell	254	6.1	+0.7
Labour	Wayne William Grills	176	4.2	–0.4
Majority		1,022	24.4	+6.8
Turnout		4,187	38.8	−9.2
Registered electors		10,801		
Liberal Democrats hold		Swing		

Salcombe
Party	Candidate	Votes	%	±%
Liberal Democrats	Louise Wainwright	1,534	39.5	+24.6
Conservative	Samantha Dennis	1,328	34.2	–25.7
Reform	Paul Leighton	810	20.9	N/A
Green	Miriam Clare Boyles	138	3.6	–7.5
Labour Co-op	Amanda Jayne Ford	64	1.6	–9.9
Majority		206	5.3	N/A
Turnout		3,883	41.9	–2.6
Registered electors		9,277		
Liberal Democrats gain from Conservative		Swing		

South Brent and Yealmpton
Party	Candidate	Votes	%	±%
Liberal Democrats	Dan Thomas*	2,397	52.3	+11.1
Conservative	Richard Hosking	941	20.5	–20.0
Reform	Jen Burdett	833	18.2	N/A
Green	Becky Warnes	288	6.3	N/A
Labour	Jack Stevens	115	2.5	–12.8
Majority		1,456	31.8	+31.1
Turnout		4,581	43.1	–5.6
Registered electors		10,630		
Liberal Democrats hold		Swing		

Totnes and Dartington
Party	Candidate	Votes	%	±%
Green	Jacqi Hodgson*	2,350	61.6	+2.0
Liberal Democrats	Lance Kennedy	408	10.7	N/A
Reform	Ainsley John Charlton	408	10.7	N/A
Conservative	Richard O'Connell	383	10.0	–11.4
Labour Co-op	Rick Gaehl	235	6.2	–8.3
Heritage	Becca Collings	20	0.5	N/A
Majority		1,942	51.1	+12.7
Turnout		3,814	36.8	–11.2
Registered electors		10,364		
Green hold		Swing		

=== Teignbridge ===
==== District summary ====
Teignbridge district summary
Party	Seats	+/-	Votes	%	+/-
Liberal Democrats	5	▲1	11,816	30.7	–5.8
Reform UK	4	▲4	11,190	29.1	+28.9
Conservative	1	▼4	7,157	18.6	–19.8
Independent	0	▼1	2,895	7.5	–0.8
Green	0	Steady	2,885	7.5	+2.0
Labour	0	Steady	2,294	6.0	–3.6
Liberal	0	Steady	92	0.2	N/A
TUSC	0	Steady	73	0.2	–1.2
Heritage	0	Steady	60	0.2	N/A
Total	10	Steady	38,462		

==== Division results ====
Ashburton and Buckfastleigh
Party	Candidate	Votes	%	±%
Conservative	Stuart Rodgers	1,021	27.1	–13.7
Reform	Matthew Stewart Sykes	906	24.1	N/A
Liberal Democrats	Jack Major	899	23.9	–10.0
Green	Pauline Angela Wynter	608	16.1	+3.2
Labour	Tristan Mark Snowsill	324	8.6	−3.1
Majority		115	3.1	–3.9
Turnout		3,766	37.4	–5.4
Registered electors		10,073		
Conservative hold		Swing		

Bovey Rural
Party	Candidate	Votes	%	±%
Liberal Democrats	Sally Angela Morgan	1,281	30.2	+9.6
Conservative	Martin Smith	1,161	27.4	–19.4
Reform	Kerri Anne Cuthbert	1,070	25.2	N/A
Labour	Lisa Collette Robillard Webb	449	10.6	–1.6
Green	Steve Day	274	6.5	–2.3
Majority		120	2.8	N/A
Turnout		4,243	40.5	–1.1
Registered electors		10,472		
Liberal Democrats gain from Conservative		Swing		

Chudleigh and Teign Valley
Party	Candidate	Votes	%	±%
Liberal Democrats	Richard Michael Keeling	1,217	30.5	–3.3
Reform	Terry Tume	1,114	27.9	N/A
Conservative	Tessa Tucker	834	20.9	–18.0
Green	Olly Giddings	457	11.4	–4.0
Labour	Rick Webb	370	9.3	–1.8
Majority		103	2.6	N/A
Turnout		3,996	37.9	–4.7
Registered electors		10,535		
Liberal Democrats gain from Conservative		Swing		

Dawlish
Party	Candidate	Votes	%	±%
Liberal Democrats	Rosie Dawson	1,923	41.5	+1.9
Reform	Christopher Graham Hilditch	1,649	35.6	+34.1
Conservative	Alex Hall	614	13.3	–24.2
Green	Kath Murphy	238	5.1	N/A
Labour	Joe Currey	192	4.1	–3.6
Majority		274	5.9	+3.8
Turnout		4,633	36.3	–2.2
Registered electors		12,753		
Liberal Democrats hold		Swing		

Exminster and Haldon
Party	Candidate	Votes	%	±%
Liberal Democrats	Alan Connett*	2,014	54.5	–10.5
Reform	Alex Johnstone	814	22.0	N/A
Conservative	Kevin Lake	515	13.9	–6.9
Green	Ben Temperton	208	5.6	–2.4
Labour	Ollie Pearson	138	3.7	–2.0
Majority		1,200	32.5	–11.9
Turnout		3,695	39.0	–3.5
Registered electors		9,464		
Liberal Democrats hold		Swing		

Ipplepen and The Kerswells
Party	Candidate	Votes	%	±%
Reform	Heather Maureen Horner	1,019	25.2	N/A
Independent	Jane Taylor	1,004	24.8	+5.1
Liberal Democrats	David Francis Palethorpe	974	24.1	–14.5
Conservative	Nick Yabsley	636	15.7	–18.0
Green	Paul David Wynter	212	5.2	+1.3
Labour	Jackie Jackson	146	3.6	±0.0
Independent	Karl Dennar Pedersen	48	1.2	N/A
Majority		15	0.4	N/A
Turnout		4,045	39.3	–5.6
Registered electors		10,305		
Reform gain from Liberal Democrats		Swing		

Kingsteignton and Teign Estuary
Party	Candidate	Votes	%	±%
Reform	Tony Dempster	1,315	35.4	N/A
Conservative	Ron Peart*	1,048	28.2	–30.7
Liberal Democrats	Pat Hackett	906	24.4	+2.5
Green	Jennie Osborne	271	7.3	N/A
Labour	Colin Baigent	172	4.6	–9.8
Majority		267	7.2	N/A
Turnout		3,717	30.8	
Registered electors		12,068		
Reform gain from Conservative		Swing		

Newton Abbot North
Party	Candidate	Votes	%	±%
Reform	Jacqueline Ann Fry	1,008	32.6	N/A
Liberal Democrats	Amanda Ineson	617	19.9	–4.0
Independent	Liam Mullone	594	19.2	–5.9
Conservative	Philip Bullivant*	509	16.4	–22.0
Green	Pip Harris	185	6.0	N/A
Labour	James Cookson	135	4.4	–4.5
Heritage	Monica Burns	29	0.9	N/A
TUSC	Tobias Matthew Robshaw	13	0.4	–2.5
Majority		391	12.7	N/A
Turnout		3,096	27.2	–2.8
Registered electors		11,362		
Reform gain from Conservative		Swing		

Newton Abbot South
Party	Candidate	Votes	%	±%
Reform	Mick Cockerham	1,045	32.9	N/A
Independent	Janet Bradford*	895	28.2	–4.9
Liberal Democrats	Rob Hayes	570	18.0	–9.7
Conservative	Richard David Jenks	321	10.1	–16.4
Green	Charlie West	155	4.9	+0.6
Labour	Duncan Moss	115	3.6	–1.8
TUSC	Jane Haden	60	1.9	+0.1
Heritage	Richard Paul Dobson	7	0.2	N/A
Majority		150	4.7	N/A
Turnout		3,175	33.4	–2.1
Registered electors		9,515		
Reform gain from Independent		Swing		

Teignmouth
Party	Candidate	Votes	%	±%
Liberal Democrats	David Cox*	1,415	33.9	–14.0
Reform	Steve Horner	1,250	30.0	N/A
Conservative	Joan Lilian Atkins	498	11.9	–22.2
Independent	Chris Clarance	354	8.5	N/A
Green	Ollie Hind	277	6.6	N/A
Labour	Lily Chasteau	253	6.1	–6.7
Liberal	Andrew Keir MacGregor	92	2.2	N/A
Heritage	Madeleine Hunt	24	0.6	N/A
Majority		165	3.9	–10.0
Turnout		4,171	36.3	–3.3
Registered electors		11,494		
Liberal Democrats hold		Swing		

=== Torridge ===
==== District summary ====
Torridge district summary
Party	Seats	+/-	Votes	%	+/-
Liberal Democrats	1	▲1	6,244	31.8	+13.7
Reform UK	3	▲3	6,240	31.7	N/A
Conservative	1	▼4	4,778	24.3	–23.2
Green	0	Steady	1,721	8.8	–0.5
Labour	0	Steady	679	3.5	–8.4
Total	5	Steady	19,662		

==== Division results ====
Bideford East
Party	Candidate	Votes	%	±%
Reform	Mark Andrew Barry	1,117	35.8	N/A
Conservative	Linda Hellyer*	637	20.4	–24.0
Green	Huw Thomas	620	19.9	–8.6
Liberal Democrats	Rachel Anne Clarke	559	17.9	+11.0
Labour	Zoe Moore	183	5.9	–12.0
Majority		480	15.4	N/A
Turnout		3,117	30.7	–1.5
Registered electors		10,143		
Reform gain from Conservative		Swing		

Bideford West and Hartland
Party	Candidate	Votes	%	±%
Reform	Robin Julian	1,079	36.9	N/A
Liberal Democrats	Claire Louise Davey-Potts	973	33.2	+25.8
Conservative	Jeff Wilton-Love*	519	17.7	–16.6
Green	Simon Mathers	274	9.4	–0.2
Labour	Sebastian Racisz	76	2.6	–11.3
Majority		106	3.6	N/A
Turnout		2,927	32.0	–0.5
Registered electors		9,152		
Reform gain from Conservative		Swing		

Holsworthy Rural
Party	Candidate	Votes	%	±%
Reform	Lynne Phyllis Rowsell	1,753	35.1	N/A
Liberal Democrats	Nigel John Evan Kenneally	1,665	33.3	+26.7
Conservative	Stephen Ralph Gibson	1,099	22.0	–36.7
Green	Tracey Beresford	363	7.3	–1.2
Labour	Catriona Kennard	113	2.3	–5.7
Majority		88	1.8	N/A
Turnout		5,000	38.6	–1.1
Registered electors		12,969		
Reform gain from Conservative		Swing		

Northam
Party	Candidate	Votes	%	±%
Conservative	Dermot McGeough*	1,500	38.8	+2.3
Reform	Derek Sargent	1,069	27.6	N/A
Liberal Democrats	Kerry Samantha O'Rourke	819	21.2	–1.2
Green	Keith Funnell	275	7.1	–0.5
Labour	Emma Louise Robbins	200	5.2	–3.8
Majority		431	11.2	N/A
Turnout		3,870	37.1	–5.7
Registered electors		10,443		
Conservative hold		Swing		

Torrington Rural
Party	Candidate	Votes	%	±%
Liberal Democrats	Cheryl Lavinia Cottle-Hunkin	2,228	46.7	+25.0
Reform	Liana Alexander Raye	1,222	25.6	N/A
Conservative	Thomas John Elliott	1,023	21.4	–33.5
Green	Colin Jones	189	4.0	–5.9
Labour Co-op	Deborah Charlotte Darling	107	2.2	–10.7
Majority		1,006	21.1	N/A
Turnout		4,772	41.1	+1.0
Registered electors		11,598		
Liberal Democrats gain from Conservative		Swing		

=== West Devon ===
==== District summary ====
West Devon district summary
Party	Seats	+/-	Votes	%	+/-
Reform UK	3	▲3	4,979	28.9	+27.9
Conservative	1	▼3	4,553	26.4	–20.9
Liberal Democrats	0	Steady	3,832	22.2	+14.2
Green	0	Steady	2,095	12.1	–3.6
Labour	0	Steady	1,030	6.0	–4.1
Independent	0	Steady	767	4.4	–13.4
Total	4	Steady	17,256		

==== Division results ====
Hatherleigh and Chagford
Party	Candidate	Votes	%	±%
Reform	Sue Davies	1,350	31.0	+29.0
Conservative	Lois Esther Samuel	1,263	29.0	–24.4
Green	Lynn Christine Daniel	962	22.1	–3.8
Liberal Democrats	Christian Adam Martin	571	13.1	+2.7
Labour	Thomas Ben Colliety	199	4.6	–2.9
Majority		87	2.0	N/A
Turnout		4,351	41.1	–0.8
Registered electors		10,577		
Reform gain from Conservative		Swing		

Okehampton Rural
Party	Candidate	Votes	%	±%
Reform	James George Grainger	1,380	33.7	+31.6
Conservative	Neil Jory	972	23.7	–22.1
Liberal Democrats	George Herbert Dexter	971	23.7	+18.2
Green	Tracy Belinda Kirnig	417	10.2	–2.8
Labour	Niall Duffy	248	6.1	–3.9
Independent	Nicholas John	99	2.4	N/A
Majority		408	10.0	N/A
Turnout		4,093	34.2	–2.2
Registered electors		11,977		
Reform gain from Conservative		Swing		

Tavistock
Party	Candidate	Votes	%	±%
Conservative	Debo Sellis*	1,316	31.9	–11.7
Liberal Democrats	Holly Greenberry-Pullen	1,169	28.4	+17.0
Reform	Gary Clifford	949	23.0	N/A
Labour	Gemma Christine Loving	351	8.5	–1.5
Green	Sara Louise Wood	312	7.6	–1.0
Majority		147	3.6	–14.5
Turnout		4,120	39.4	–2.4
Registered electors		10,449		
Conservative hold		Swing		

Yelverton Rural
Party	Candidate	Votes	%	±%
Reform	Michael Fife Cook	1,300	27.5	N/A
Liberal Democrats	Chris West	1,121	23.7	+18.3
Conservative	Philip Sanders*	1,002	21.2	–23.8
Independent	Mark Christian Renders	668	14.1	–8.2
Green	Judy Sara Maciejowska	404	8.5	–6.2
Labour	Uwem Eno Udo	232	4.9	–7.0
Majority		179	3.8	N/A
Turnout		4,733	41.9	–1.8
Registered electors		11,298		
Reform gain from Conservative		Swing		
