= 1991 East Devon District Council election =

1991 UK local government election

The 1991 East Devon District Council election took place on 2 May 1991 to elect members of East Devon District Council in England. This was on the same day as other local elections. There were minor changes to the district boundaries for this election.

== New district boundaries ==
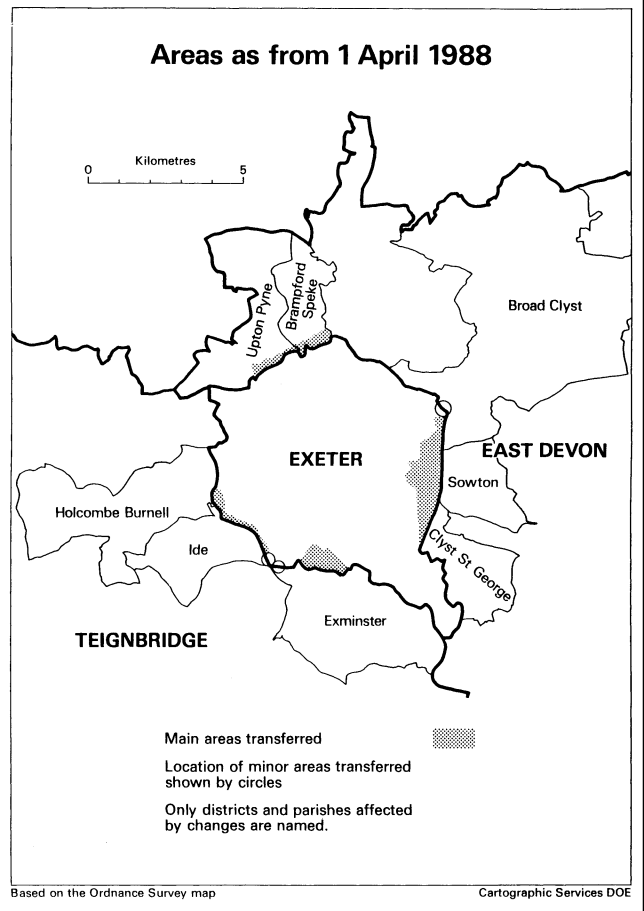

District boundary changes took place effective April 1988. No districts were added or created. All changes involved the city of Exeter, which borders East Devon to the west. The areas transferred from Exeter to East Devon had a population of about nine persons; the areas transferred from East Devon to Exeter had an estimated population of 189.

== Ward results ==
=== Axminster Hamlets ===
Axminster Hamlets
Party	Candidate	Votes	%
Conservative	K. Voysey	305	37.6
Liberal Democrats	S. Gudge	302	37.2
Labour	H. Self	204	25.2
Turnout			60.7
Conservative hold			

=== Axminster Town ===
Axminster Town
Party	Candidate	Votes	%
Conservative	A. Moulding	1,032	47.5
Liberal Democrats	D. Hull	832	38.3
Conservative	A. Drake	787	
Labour	R. Birnie	156	7.2
Green	P. Woods	152	7.0
Labour	M. Mincham	132	
Turnout			69.5
Conservative hold			
Liberal Democrats gain from Conservative			

=== Beer ===
Beer
Party	Candidate	Votes	%
Conservative	A. Boalch	428	58.1
Liberal Democrats	M. Rogers	309	41.9
Turnout			62.5
Conservative hold			

=== Broadclyst ===
Broadclyst
Party	Candidate	Votes	%
Liberal	D. Button	886	40.2
Liberal Democrats	D. Gent	797	36.2
Conservative	H. Dowell	519	23.6
Conservative	E. Derham	496	
Turnout			57.9
Liberal gain from Alliance			
Liberal Democrats gain from Conservative			

=== Budleigh Salterton ===
Budleigh Salterton
Party	Candidate	Votes	%
Independent	R. Franklin	1,726	41.2
Conservative	R. Mitchell	1,422	34.0
Conservative	E. Brookes	1,383	
Conservative	C. Piper	1,231	
Green	J. Philbrick	620	14.8
Labour	H. Leahy	419	10.0
Turnout			67.1
Independent gain from Conservative			
Conservative hold			
Conservative hold			

=== Clyst Valley ===
Clyst Valley
Party	Candidate	Votes	%
Conservative	E. Hart	613	74.5
Labour	G. Beamer	210	25.5
Turnout			53.0
Conservative hold			

=== Clystbeare ===
Clystbeare
Party	Candidate	Votes	%
Conservative	M. Laptain	397	53.9
Liberal Democrats	P. Dunning	245	33.2
Labour	G. Gregory	95	12.9
Turnout			56.3
Conservative hold			

=== Colyton ===
Colyton
Party	Candidate	Votes	%
Conservative	R. Collier	412	60.5
Liberal Democrats	L. Porch	269	39.5
Turnout			28.7
Conservative hold			

=== Eden Vale ===
Eden Vale
Party	Candidate	Votes	%
Conservative	H. Waterworth	492	51.3
Liberal Democrats	M. Olive	468	48.8
Turnout			61.4
Conservative hold			

=== Exe Valley ===
Exe Valley
Party	Candidate	Votes	%
Conservative	N. Whidden	481	53.3
Liberal	G. Burns	307	34.0
Green	M. Shearing	114	12.6
Turnout			56.2
Conservative hold			

=== Exmouth Brixington ===
Exmouth Brixington
Party	Candidate	Votes	%
Liberal Democrats	B. Toye	1,188	35.7
Conservative	K. Durkin	1,145	34.4
Liberal Democrats	M. Hardy	1,126	
Conservative	J. Mountford	1,029	
Conservative	B. Ingham	1,025	
Labour	S. Haine	594	17.9
Green	J. Rosser	397	11.9
Turnout			58.4
Liberal Democrats gain from Conservative			
Conservative hold			
Liberal Democrats gain from Conservative			

=== Exmouth Halsdon ===
Exmouth Halsdon
Party	Candidate	Votes	%
Conservative	B. Hughes	1,132	42.9
Conservative	A. Handford	1,068	
Conservative	J. Elson	1,067	
Liberal Democrats	K. Richardson	901	34.1
Labour	S. Gazzard	608	23.0
Turnout			66.6
Conservative hold			
Conservative hold			
Conservative hold			

=== Exmouth Littleham Rural ===
Exmouth Littleham Rural
Party	Candidate	Votes	%
Conservative	D. Shenton	1,065	37.4
Conservative	D. Gibbons	1,033	
Conservative	M. Stokes	1,028	
Liberal Democrats	A. Toye	857	30.1
Labour	C. Davison	502	17.6
Green	M. Rosser	427	15.0
Turnout			66.2
Conservative hold			
Conservative hold			
Conservative hold			

=== Exmouth Littleham Urban ===
Exmouth Littleham Urban
Party	Candidate	Votes	%
Conservative	B. Willoughby	617	40.0
Conservative	D. Scott	612	
Liberal Democrats	M. Hardy	453	29.3
Labour	H. Tapper	257	16.6
Green	R. Guest	217	14.1
Turnout			53.1
Conservative hold			
Conservative hold			

=== Exmouth Withycombe Raleigh ===
Exmouth Withycombe Raleigh
Party	Candidate	Votes	%
Liberal Democrats	G. Chamberlain	1,104	46.6
Liberal Democrats	B. Taylor	933	
Liberal Democrats	K. Turner	845	
Conservative	B. Costello	804	33.9
Conservative	G. Phillips	694	
Labour	J. Salter	463	19.5
Turnout			52.6
Liberal Democrats gain from Conservative			
Liberal Democrats gain from Alliance			
Liberal Democrats gain from Alliance			

=== Exmouth Withycombe Urban ===
Exmouth Withycombe Urban
Party	Candidate	Votes	%
Liberal Democrats	M. Parkinson	740	37.5
Conservative	J. Squire	587	29.8
Liberal Democrats	B. Worts	578	
Conservative	P. Marshall	455	
Labour	K. Eastwood	445	22.6
Green	D. Hill	199	10.1
Turnout			62.1
Liberal Democrats gain from Alliance			
Conservative gain from Alliance			

=== Honiton St. Michaels ===
Honiton St. Michaels
Party	Candidate	Votes	%
Conservative	W. Cogger	660	30.9
Green	A. Tootill	637	29.8
SDP	R. Coombs	554	25.9
Conservative	N. Page-Turner	492	
Labour	M. Macdonald	284	13.3
Turnout			61.3
Conservative hold			
Green gain from Alliance			

=== Honiton St. Pauls ===
Honiton St. Pauls
Party	Candidate	Votes	%
Independent	V. Ash	909	36.3
Conservative	R. Gigg	898	35.9
Conservative	A. Glanvill	841	
Labour	R. Sharpe	694	27.7
Turnout			67.8
Independent gain from Conservative			
Conservative hold			

=== Lympstone ===
Lympstone
Party	Candidate	Votes	%
Liberal Democrats	D. Hinchliffe	518	58.5
Conservative	D. Atkins	329	37.2
Labour	H. Davey	38	4.3
Turnout			65.5
Liberal Democrats gain from Conservative			

=== Newbridges ===
Newbridges
Party	Candidate	Votes	%
Conservative	V. Bowles	486	57.7
Liberal Democrats	S. Ward	263	31.2
Labour	P. Clive-Francis	94	11.2
Turnout			54.5
Conservative hold			

=== Newton Poppleford & Harpford ===
Newton Poppleford & Harpford
Party	Candidate	Votes	%
Conservative	V. Webber	378	46.7
Independent	G. Compton	296	36.5
Raving Loony Green Giant	S. Greenwood	74	9.1
Labour	S. Scott	62	7.7
Turnout			54.8
Conservative hold			

=== Otterhead ===
Otterhead
Party	Candidate	Votes	%
Conservative	E. Bartlett	382	55.4
Liberal Democrats	A. Cornish	262	38.0
Labour	E. Hayler	46	6.7
Turnout			35.9
Conservative hold			

=== Ottery St. Mary Rural ===
Ottery St. Mary Rural
Party	Candidate	Votes	%
Conservative	S. Randall Johnson	1,063	38.5
Independent	E. Hadley	1,054	38.2
Conservative	G. Brown	962	
Green	D. Hulin	382	13.8
Labour	J. Holme	185	6.7
Raving Loony Green Giant	D. Bamford	75	2.7
Turnout			45.5
Conservative hold			
Independent gain from Conservative			

=== Ottery St. Mary Town ===
Ottery St. Mary Town
Party	Candidate	Votes	%
Conservative	R. Ferguson	736	26.6
Green	P. Foggitt	676	24.4
Independent	B. Small	618	22.3
Conservative	R. Stuart	534	
Liberal	P. O'Neil	392	14.2
Labour	J. Gregory	347	12.5
Turnout			61.1
Conservative hold			
Green gain from Conservative			

=== Patteson ===
Patteson
Party	Candidate	Votes	%
Conservative	D. Bolt	680	53.0
Liberal Democrats	D. Rotherham	295	23.0
Independent	R. Bell	194	15.1
Labour	R. Price	113	8.8
Turnout			57.5
Conservative hold			

=== Raleigh ===
Raleigh
Party	Candidate	Votes	%
Conservative	R. Atkinson	0	N/A
Turnout			0.0
Conservative hold			

=== Seaton ===
Seaton
Party	Candidate	Votes	%
Conservative	A. Ffoulkes	1,399	30.6
Conservative	V. Hetherington	1,353	
Liberal Democrats	N. Rogers	1,272	27.8
Conservative	J. Knight	1,153	
Independent	S. Kastner	845	18.5
Green	R. Damon	533	11.7
Labour	T. Farnhill	521	11.4
Turnout			60.2
Conservative hold			
Conservative hold			
Liberal Democrats gain from Conservative			

=== Sidmouth Rural ===
Sidmouth Rural
Party	Candidate	Votes	%
Conservative	S. Gush	1,650	49.9
Conservative	J. Sutherland-Earl	1,401	
Conservative	F. Pinney	1,305	
Liberal Democrats	C. Wale	860	26.0
Labour	S. Mills	481	14.5
Raving Loony Green Giant	R. Ackford	315	9.5
Turnout			64.3
Conservative hold			
Conservative hold			
Conservative hold			

=== Sidmouth Town ===
Sidmouth Town
Party	Candidate	Votes	%
Conservative	B. Clark	1,207	61.8
Conservative	T. Fraser	1,097	
Liberal Democrats	J. Lee	445	22.8
Labour	D. Dorey	207	10.6
Raving Loony Green Giant	V. Prince	93	4.8
Turnout			67.4
Conservative hold			
Conservative hold			

=== Sidmouth Woolbrook ===
Sidmouth Woolbrook
Party	Candidate	Votes	%
Conservative	G. Liverton	1,141	38.7
Conservative	F. Lock	1,051	
Raving Loony Green Giant	S. Hughes	865	29.4
Conservative	G. Denton	797	
Raving Loony Green Giant	J. Hughes	540	
Liberal Democrats	R. Murch	524	17.8
Labour	S. Pollentine	417	14.1
Raving Loony Green Giant	C. Patch	359	
Turnout			68.8
Conservative hold			
Conservative hold			
Raving Loony Green Giant gain from Labour			

=== Tale Vale ===
Tale Vale
Party	Candidate	Votes	%
Conservative	W. Thorne	598	67.6
Green	W. Lees	170	19.2
Labour	L. Black	116	13.1
Turnout			56.0
Conservative hold			

=== Trinity ===
Trinity
Party	Candidate	Votes	%
Independent	S. Manfield	478	40.8
Conservative	B. Mason	416	35.5
Liberal Democrats	M. Hodder	184	15.7
Labour	S. Newman	53	4.5
Green	A. Evans	42	3.6
Turnout			66.2
Independent gain from Conservative			

=== Upper Axe ===
Upper Axe
Party	Candidate	Votes	%
Liberal Democrats	J. Sharratt	622	63.4
Conservative	J. Dugdale	325	33.1
Labour	R. Goodland	34	3.5
Turnout			71.8
Liberal Democrats gain from Conservative			

=== Woodbury ===
Woodbury
Party	Candidate	Votes	%
Conservative	S. Owen	649	73.9
Labour	T. Neal	229	26.1
Turnout			43.8
Conservative gain from Alliance			

=== Yarty ===
Yarty
Party	Candidate	Votes	%
Conservative	R. Long	647	67.1
Liberal Democrats	J. Metcalfe	215	22.3
Green	C. Tootill	52	5.4
Labour	K. Kellam	50	5.2
Turnout			61.4
Conservative hold			
