= 1997 Devon County Council election =

1997 UK local government election

- 1 May 1997

All 79 seats to Devon County Council 40 seats needed for a majority
- Turnout: 76.2%

The 1997 Devon County Council election was an election for all 79 seats on the council. Devon County Council was a county council that covered the majority of the ceremonial county of Devon. The elections took place concurrently with other local elections across England.

== Election results ==
1997 Devon County Council election
Party	Seats	Gains	Losses	Net gain/loss	Seats %	Votes %	Votes	+/−
Liberal Democrats	31					38.8		▼3.1
Conservative	13					34.4		▲0.1
Labour	4					17.8		▲3.1
Independent	4					5.4		▼1.3
Other parties	2					2.4		▲0.5
Green	0					1.3		▲0.7
