= 2009 Devon County Council election =

2009 UK local government election

- 7 May 2009

All 62 seats to Devon County Council 32 seats needed for a majority
- Registered: 583,496
- Turnout: 255,875; 43.9% (▼23.5 pp)
	First party	Second party	Third party
Party	Conservative	Liberal Democrats	Labour
Last election	23 seats, 37.7%	33 seats, 38.0%	4 seats, 12.1%
Seats won	41	14	4
Seat change	▲18	▼19	Steady
Popular vote	106,411	75,815	15,339
Percentage	41.9%	29.9%	6.1%
Swing	▲4.2%	▼8.1%	▼6.0%
	Fourth party	Fifth party
Party	Independent	Green
Last election	2 seats, 4.3%	0 seats, 2.5%
Seats won	2	1
Seat change	Steady	▲1
Popular vote	11,768	17,290
Percentage	4.6%	6.8%
Swing	▲0.3%	▲4.3%
- Mapped results by ward
Council control before election
Liberal Democrat
Council control after election
Conservative

An election to Devon County Council took place on 7 May 2009 as part of the 2009 United Kingdom local elections. The elections had been delayed from 7 May, to coincide with elections to the European Parliament. 62 councillors were elected from various electoral divisions, which returned either one or two county councillors each by first-past-the-post voting for a four-year term of office. The electoral divisions were the same as those used at the previous election in 2005. No elections were held in Plymouth and Torbay, which are unitary authorities outside the area covered by the County Council.

All locally registered electors (British, Irish, Commonwealth and European Union citizens) who were aged 18 or over on Thursday 2 May 2009 were entitled to vote in the local elections. Those who were temporarily away from their ordinary address (for example, away working, on holiday, in student accommodation or in hospital) were also entitled to vote in the local elections, although those who had moved abroad and registered as overseas electors cannot vote in the local elections. It is possible to register to vote at more than one address (such as a university student who had a term-time address and lives at home during holidays) at the discretion of the local Electoral Register Office, but it remains an offence to vote more than once in the same local government election.

== Summary ==
The election saw the Liberal Democrats lose control of the council to the Conservatives. The Liberal Democrats were reduced to the second largest party and hence the official opposition. Devon was one of 2 county councils controlled by the Liberal Democrats, the other being Somerset County Council, both were lost to the Conservative Party.

== Results ==
Devon County Council election, 2009
Party	Seats	Gains	Losses	Net gain/loss	Seats %	Votes %	Votes	+/−
Conservative	41	19	1	▲18	66.1	41.9	106,411	▲4.2
Liberal Democrats	14	0	19	▼19	22.6	29.9	75,815	▼8.1
Labour	4	0	0	Steady	6.5	6.1	15,339	▼6.0
Independent	2	1	1	Steady	3.2	4.6	11,768	▲0.9
Green	1	1	0	▲1	1.6	6.8	17,290	▲4.3
UKIP	0	0	0	Steady	0.0	9.0	22,809	▲4.9
Liberal	0	0	0	Steady	0.0	1.0	2,440	▼0.1
BNP	0	0	0	Steady	0.0	0.5	1,385	New
Communist	0	0	0	Steady	0.0	0.0	74	New
