= Devon County Council =

British administrative authority

Coordinates: 50°42′53″N 3°31′3″W

Type
- Type: Non-metropolitan county council

Leadership
- Chair: Rosie Dawson, Liberal Democrat since 28 May 2026
- Leader: Julian Brazil, Liberal Democrat since 22 May 2025
- Chief Executive: Donna Manson since 17 February 2023

Structure
- Seats: 60 councillors
- Graph of the party split among 60 seats.
- Political groups: Administration (35) Liberal Democrats (27) Green (6) Independent (2) Other parties (25) Reform UK (16) Conservative (7) Independent (2)
- Length of term: 4 years

Elections
- Voting system: First-past-the-post
- Last election: 1 May 2025

Meeting place
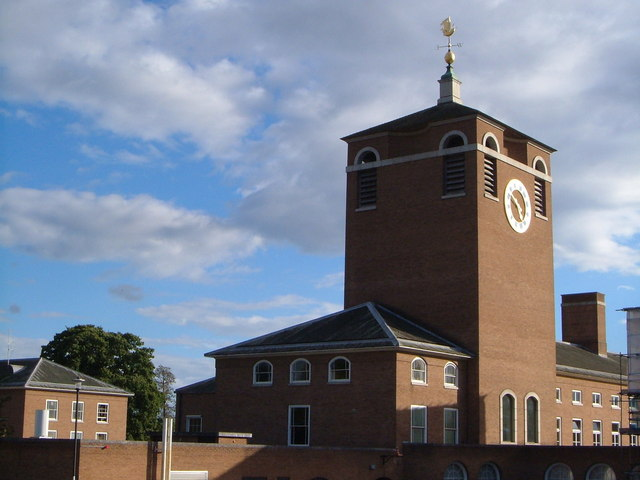
- County Hall, Topsham Road, Exeter, EX2 4QD

Website
- www.devon.gov.uk

Constitution
- The Constitution of Devon County Council

Devon County Council is the county council administering the English county of Devon. The council is based at Devon County Hall in the city of Exeter.

The area administered by the county council is termed the non-metropolitan county, which is smaller than the ceremonial county; the non-metropolitan county excludes Plymouth and Torbay. The population of the non-metropolitan county was estimated at 795,286 in 2018, making it the most populous local authority in South West England.

Devon is an area with "two-tier" local government, meaning that the county is divided into non-metropolitan districts carrying out less strategic functions, such as taking most planning decisions. There are eight such districts in the county council's area, each with its own district, borough, or city council.

== History ==
=== Administration ===
Devon County Council was established in 1889 under the Local Government Act 1888, which created elected county councils to take over the administrative functions previously performed by unelected magistrates at the quarter sessions. Three boroughs within the geographical county of Devon were excluded from the county council's authority: Devonport, Exeter, and Plymouth, which were each considered large enough for their existing councils to take on county-level functions. They were therefore made county boroughs. The county council was elected by and provided services to the remainder of Devon outside those three boroughs, an area termed the administrative county.

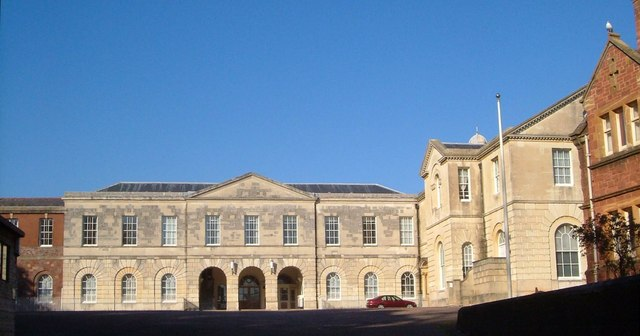
The old courthouse and county council offices within Rougemont Castle: County Council's headquarters until 1964.

The first county council elections were held on 16 January 1889, and the council formally came into being on 1 April 1889. On that day it held its first official meeting in the courthouse at Rougemont Castle (also known as Exeter Castle), which had been the meeting place of the quarter sessions which preceded the county council. Charles Hepburn-Stuart-Forbes-Trefusis, 20th Baron Clinton, a Conservative peer, was the first chairman of the council. He had been the chairman of the Devon quarter sessions since 1863 and was also the Lord Lieutenant of Devon.

The council's budget in its first year was £50,000 (equivalent to £5,560,000 in 2025). In 1907, women became eligible for election and the first female councillor was elected in 1931.

Stonehouse was removed from the administrative county in 1914 when it and Devonport were absorbed into the county borough of Plymouth. Torbay was created as a new county borough in 1968, removing it from the administrative county.

In 1971, Devon County Council signed a twinning charter with the Conseil General of Calvados to develop links with the French department of Calvados.

The council was significantly reformed in 1974 under the Local Government Act 1972. Exeter, Torbay and Plymouth were brought within the area controlled by the county council, which was reclassified as a non-metropolitan county. The lower tier of local government was reorganised at the same time. It had previously comprised numerous boroughs, urban districts and rural districts; after 1974 there were ten non-metropolitan districts in the county. Torbay and Plymouth subsequently regained their independence from the county council in 1998 when their councils took over county council functions, making them unitary authorities.

Between 2007 and 2010, plans were prepared for reorganising local government in Devon. Legislation was passed early in 2010 for making Exeter a unitary authority. However, following the 2010 general election the new government announced in May 2010 that the reorganisation would be stopped.

Since 2025 the county council has been a member of the Devon and Torbay Combined County Authority.

In July 2026, the government announced its decision to abolish the county council in 2028 as part of upcoming structural changes to local government in England. Four unitary authorities are proposed to cover Devon instead.

=== Data protection ===
In 2012 the council was fined £90,000 by the Information Commissioner's Office (ICO) after it sent confidential and sensitive information about twenty-two people, including criminal allegations and information about their mental health, to the wrong recipient. Commenting on Devon and other authorities who had made similar data protection breaches, the ICO said "It would be far too easy to consider these breaches as simple human error. The reality is that they are caused by councils treating sensitive personal data in the same routine way they would deal with more general correspondence. Far too often in these cases, the councils do not appear to have acknowledged that the data they are handling is about real people, and often the more vulnerable members of society."

=== Premises ===
The county council is based at Devon County Hall on Topsham Road in Exeter, which was completed in 1964 to the designs of Donald McMorran.

Prior to 1964 the council was based at Rougemont Castle in Exeter, where the quarter sessions for the county had been held for many years prior to the creation of the county council. An office building for the county council was built in 1895 adjoining the existing courthouse, which had been built in 1773 within the castle.

== Political composition ==
Map of the results of the 2025 Devon County Council election.

The council has been under no overall control since the 2025 election, with the Liberal Democrats the largest party, holding 27 of the 60 seats. The leader of the council, Julian Brazil, is a Liberal Democrat, and the party has nine of the ten seats on the council's cabinet. The other cabinet place is held by the Green Party.

As of 16 May 2026, the composition of the council was:

Party	Councillors
Liberal Democrats	27
Reform	16
Conservative	7
Green	6
Independent	4
Total:	60

Two of the independent councillors sit with the Green Party as the "Green and Independent Group".

Since the last boundary changes in 2017 the council has comprised 60 councillors, representing 58 electoral divisions. Most divisions elect one councillor, but two divisions (Broadclyst and Exmouth) elect two councillors. Elections are held every four years.

=== Historical control ===
Political control of the council since the 1974 reforms has been as follows:

Party in control	Years
Conservative	1974–1985
No overall control	1985–1989
Conservative	1989–1993
Liberal Democrats	1993–2001
No overall control	2001–2005
Liberal Democrats	2005–2009
Conservative	2009–2025
No overall control	2025–present

=== Leadership ===
The leaders of the council since 1974 have been:

Councillor	Party	From	To
George Creber	Conservative	1974	1981
Arnold Sayers	Conservative	1981	1985
David Morrish	Liberal	1985	Jul 1987
(no leader)		Jul 1987	May 1989
Ted Pinney	Conservative	May 1989	May 1991
Simon Day	Conservative	May 1991	1993
Brian Greenslade	Liberal Democrats	May 1993	2002
Christine Channon	Conservative	2002	2003
Brian Greenslade	Liberal Democrats	2003	2004
Christine Channon	Conservative	2004	May 2005
Brian Greenslade	Liberal Democrats	26 May 2005	Jun 2009
John Hart	Conservative	25 Jun 2009	May 2024
James McInnes	Conservative	23 May 2024	1 May 2025
Julian Brazil	Liberal Democrats	23 May 2025	

== Responsibilities for services ==
Map of Devon's eight districts and two unitary areas. Devon County Council is the top-tier authority in all but 8 and 10, the unitary authority areas of Plymouth and Torbay, which are self-governed but part of the ceremonial county of Devon.

Devon County Council's responsibilities include schools, social care for the elderly and vulnerable, road maintenance, libraries and trading standards. It is the largest employer in Devon, employing over 20,000 people, and has the largest minor road length (7,373 miles (11,866 km) — 2014) of any UK local authority; major roads are managed by National Highways. Devon County Council leads DevonBus, an Enhanced Partnership covering the county, with the purpose of improving the bus network and creating a unified brand for buses in the county. Devon County Council appoints eleven members to the Devon and Somerset Fire and Rescue Authority. The Office for National Statistics estimated that the mid-2014 population of the non-metropolitan area of Devon was 765,302, which is the largest in the South West England region.

The county council's area is also administered by eight smaller authorities that have their own district, borough or city councils. The responsibilities of these councils include local planning, council housing, refuse collection, sports and leisure facilities, and street cleaning. The district areas are further divided into civil parishes, which have "parish councils" or "town councils"; the latter of which often use a town hall. Typical activities undertaken by a parish council include maintaining allotments, footpaths, playing fields and the local community or village hall. On some matters, the county council share responsibilities with the district and parish councils. These include economic development and regeneration, emergency planning, tourism promotion and coastal protection.

No. ‡	District	Type of council	Population (mid-2014 est.)	Area (hectares)
5	Exeter	City council	124,328	4,789
4	East Devon	District council	136,374	82,372
3	Mid Devon	District council	79,198	91,290
1	North Devon	District council	94,059	110,504
2	Torridge	District council	65,618	99,566
6	West Devon	Borough council	54,260	116,472
9	South Hams	District council	84,108	90,525
7	Teignbridge	District council	127,357	68,101

‡ As shown on map

== Graphic symbols ==
The Flag of Devon; first raised in 2006

There was no established coat of arms for the county until 1926: the arms of the City of Exeter were often used to represent Devon, for instance in the badge of the Devonshire Regiment. During the formation of a county council by the Local Government Act 1888, adoption of a common seal was required. The seal contained three shields depicting the arms of Exeter along with those of the first chairman and vice-chairman of the council (Lord Clinton and the Earl of Morley).

On 11 October 1926, the county council received a grant of arms from the College of Arms. The main part of the shield displays a red crowned lion on a silver field, the arms of Richard Plantagenet, Earl of Cornwall. The chief or upper portion of the shield depicts an ancient ship on waves, for Devon's seafaring traditions. The Latin motto adopted was Auxilio Divino ("by divine aid"), that of Sir Francis Drake. The 1926 grant was of escutcheon (shield) alone. On 6 March 1962 a further grant of crest and supporters was obtained. The crest is the head of a Dartmoor Pony rising from a "Naval Crown". This distinctive form of crown is formed from the sails and sterns of ships, and is associated with the Royal Navy. The supporters are a Devon bull and a sea lion.

The County Council adopted a 'ship silhouette' logo after the 1974 reorganisation, adapted from the ship emblem on the coat of arms, but following the loss in 1998 of Plymouth and Torbay re-adopted the coat of arms. In April 2006 the council unveiled a new logo which was to be used in most everyday applications, though the coat of arms will continue to be used for "various civic purposes".

In 2002, the BBC Devon website held a poll in response to a discussion for a flag of Devon. Ryan Sealey's winning design of green, white, and black was raised outside County Hall in 2006 to celebrate Local Democracy Week and is endorsed by Devon County Council.

== See also ==
- List of articles about local government in the United Kingdom
