= East Devon District Council elections =

Local government elections in Devon, England

East Devon District Council is the local authority for East Devon in England. The council is elected every four years. Sixty councillors are elected from 30 wards since the last boundary changes in 2019.

== Election results ==
Composition of the council
Year	Conservative	Liberal Democrats (Note: Includes totals for the predecessors of the Liberal Democrats, the Liberal Party and SDP (both of which participated in the Alliance).)	Labour	Alliance	Green (Note: Includes totals for the predecessors of the Green Party of England and Wales, the Ecology Party and Green Party UK.)	Independents & Others	Council control after election
Local government reorganisation; council established (60 seats)
1973	15	3	1	–	–	41	Independent
1976	44	3	1	–	0	12	Conservative
New ward boundaries (60 seats)
1979	49	3	1	–	0	7	Conservative
1980	48	4	1	–	0	7	Conservative
1982	48	7	0	–	0	5	Conservative
1983	46	8	1	–	0	5	Conservative
1984	43	13	1	–	0	3	Conservative
1986	45	11	1	–	0	3	Conservative
1987	52	7	1	–	0	0	Conservative
1991	41	11	0	–	0	8	Conservative
1995	30	20	0	–	0	10	No overall control
1999	39	14	1	–	0	6	Conservative
New ward boundaries (59 seats)
2003	35	18	0	–	0	6	Conservative
2007	43	10	0	–	0	6	Conservative
2011	43	10	0	–	0	6	Conservative
2015	37	6	0	10	0	6	Conservative
New ward boundaries (59 seats)
2019	20	8	0	11	2	19	No overall control
2023	17	18	3	–	2	20 (Note: 19 Independents, 1 Liberal)	No overall control

== Results maps ==
2003 results map

2007 results map

2011 results map

2015 results map

2019 results map

2023 results map

== By-election results ==
=== 1995-1999 ===
Exe Valley By-Election 24 July 1997
Party	Candidate	Votes	%	±%
Liberal Democrats		405	53.4	+53.4
Conservative		316	41.7	−13.4
Labour		37	4.9	−21.4
Majority		89	11.7	
Turnout		758	51.5	
Liberal Democrats gain from Conservative		Swing		

Trinity By-Election 30 October 1997
Party	Candidate	Votes	%	±%
Conservative		373	51.1	+2.8
Liberal Democrats		357	48.9	−10.3
Majority		16	2.2	
Turnout		730		
Conservative hold		Swing		

Clystbeare By-Election 2 April 1998
Party	Candidate	Votes	%	±%
Conservative		445	57.5	+4.2
Liberal Democrats		329	42.5	+18.1
Majority		116	15.0	
Turnout		774		
Conservative hold		Swing		

Exmouth Littleham Rural By-Election 7 May 1998
Party	Candidate	Votes	%	±%
Liberal Democrats		654	38.6	−1.6
Conservative		617	36.4	+3.4
Independent		296	17.5	+8.8
Labour		128	7.6	−10.5
Majority		37	2.2	
Turnout		1,695	40.4	
Liberal Democrats gain from Conservative		Swing		

=== 1999-2003 ===
Patteson By-Election 18 April 2000
Party	Candidate	Votes	%	±%
Liberal Democrats		503	50.1	+50.1
Conservative		470	46.8	−14.0
Labour		31	3.1	−36.1
Majority		33	3.3	
Turnout		1,004	40.0	
Liberal Democrats gain from Conservative		Swing		

Exmouth Withycombe Urban By-Election 26 October 2000
Party	Candidate	Votes	%	±%
Liberal Democrats		400	51.2	+25.3
Conservative		171	21.9	−2.7
Liberal		126	16.1	−15.1
Independent		84	10.8	+10.8
Majority		229	29.3	
Turnout		781	24.1	
Liberal Democrats hold		Swing		

Honiton St. Pauls By-Election 8 February 2001
Party	Candidate	Votes	%	±%
Conservative		614	49.5	+15.0
Liberal Democrats		502	40.5	+20.9
Labour		124	10.0	−0.8
Majority		112	9.0	
Turnout		1,240	33.4	
Conservative hold		Swing		

Sidmouth Rural By-Election 9 May 2002
Party	Candidate	Votes	%	±%
Conservative		1,020	44.3	+4.2
Liberal Democrats		663	28.8	+11.5
Independent		312	13.5	+0.0
Independent		309	13.4	+13.4
Majority		357	15.5	
Turnout		2,304	49.3	
Conservative gain from Independent		Swing		

=== 2003-2007 ===
Sidmouth Town By-Election 27 January 2005
Party	Candidate	Votes	%	±%
Conservative		1,147	57.6	−5.4
Liberal Democrats		702	35.3	+35.3
Labour		141	7.1	−29.9
Majority		445	22.3	
Turnout		1,990		
Conservative hold		Swing		

Seaton By-Election 22 September 2005
Party	Candidate	Votes	%	±%
Conservative	Jim Knight	1,055	53.3	+21.7
Liberal Democrats		925	46.7	−2.1
Majority		130	6.6	
Turnout		1,980	33.6	
Conservative gain from Liberal Democrats		Swing		

Sidmouth Town By-Election 22 September 2005
Party	Candidate	Votes	%	±%
Conservative	Chris Gibbings	894	70.0	+12.4
Liberal Democrats		184	14.4	−20.9
Independent		136	10.6	+10.6
Labour		64	5.0	−2.1
Majority		709	55.6	
Turnout		1,279	29.0	
Conservative hold		Swing		

Honiton St Pauls By-Election 2 March 2006
Party	Candidate	Votes	%	±%
Conservative	Roger Boote	522	55.3	+24.9
Liberal Democrats	Vera Howard	208	22.0	−0.2
Labour	Vernon Whitlock	137	14.5	+7.7
Independent	Ronald Farnham	76	8.1	−28.4
Majority		314	33.3	
Turnout		943	26.0	
Conservative hold		Swing		

=== 2007-2011 ===
Dunkeswell By-Election 3 April 2008
Party	Candidate	Votes	%	±%
Conservative	Robert Buxton	349	68.3	+5.2
Liberal Democrats	Michael Gleed	162	31.7	−5.2
Majority		187	36.6	
Turnout		511	31.4	
Conservative hold		Swing		

Honiton St Michaels By-Election 26 February 2009
Party	Candidate	Votes	%	±%
Liberal Democrats	Marion Olive	636	51.1	+51.1
Conservative	Phillip Twiss	609	48.9	−20.9
Majority		27	2.2	
Turnout		1,245	23.7	
Liberal Democrats gain from Conservative		Swing		

Trinity By-Election 12 November 2009
Party	Candidate	Votes	%	±%
Conservative	Ian Thomas	unopposed		
Conservative gain from Independent		Swing		

Seaton By-Election 6 May 2010
Party	Candidate	Votes	%	±%
Liberal Democrats	Peter Burrows	2,414	57.4	+16.6
Conservative	John Meakin	1,795	42.6	+0.3
Majority		619	14.7	
Turnout		4,209	70.8	
Liberal Democrats hold		Swing		

=== 2011-2015 ===
Feniton and Buckerell By-Election 2 May 2013
Party	Candidate	Votes	%	±%
Independent	Susan Bond	772	87.2	+87.2
Conservative	Andrew Dinnis	113	12.8	−43.7
Majority		659	74.4	
Turnout		885		
Independent gain from Conservative		Swing		

=== 2015-2019 ===
Exmouth Littleham By-Election 21 July 2016
Party	Candidate	Votes	%	±%
Conservative	Bruce de Saram	547	45.3	+19.0
Liberal Democrats	Alex Sadiq	467	38.7	+20.2
Labour	Keith Edwards	193	16.0	+16.0
Majority		80	6.6	
Turnout		1,207		
Conservative hold		Swing		

Honiton St Michael's By-Election 21 July 2016
Party	Candidate	Votes	%	±%
Conservative	Jenny Brown	362	39.8	+0.3
East Devon Alliance	John Taylor	211	23.2	+2.8
Labour	Henry Brown	197	21.6	+21.6
UKIP	Ashley Alder	140	15.4	−5.3
Majority		151	16.6	
Turnout		910		
Conservative hold		Swing		

Exmouth Brixington By-Election 6 October 2016
Party	Candidate	Votes	%	±%
Conservative	Darryl Nicholas	425	41.1	+4.7
East Devon Alliance	Robin Humphreys	324	31.3	+2.9
Liberal Democrats	Alex Sadiq	286	27.6	+8.7
Majority		101	9.8	
Turnout		1,035		
Conservative hold		Swing		

Broadclyst By-Election 4 May 2017
Party	Candidate	Votes	%	±%
Liberal Democrats	Eleanor Rylance	1,045	52.3	+21.1
Conservative	Ray Bloxham	953	47.7	+10.4
Majority		92	4.6	
Turnout		1,998		
Liberal Democrats gain from Conservative		Swing		

Whimple By-Election 4 May 2017
Party	Candidate	Votes	%	±%
Conservative	Mark Evans-Martin	455	52.1	−2.0
Liberal Democrats	Martin Gammell	419	47.9	+2.0
Majority		36	4.2	
Turnout		874		
Conservative hold		Swing		

Exmouth Town By-Election 1 March 2018
Party	Candidate	Votes	%	±%
Liberal Democrats	Tim Dumper	187	28.2	−2.8
Independent	Daphne Currier	176	26.6	+26.6
Conservative	Tony Hill	142	21.5	−3.6
Labour	Dilys Hadley	86	13.0	−7.7
Green	Robert Masding	71	10.7	−12.6
Majority		11	1.7	
Turnout		662		
Liberal Democrats hold		Swing		

Exmouth Town By-Election 20 September 2018
Party	Candidate	Votes	%	±%
Independent	Geoff Pratt	755	59.4	+59.4
Conservative	John Sheaves	421	33.1	−12.3
Liberal Democrats	Nick Benson	51	4.0	+4.0
Green	Margaret Bargmann	24	1.9	+1.9
Labour	Richard May	20	1.6	+1.6
Majority		334	26.3	
Turnout		1,271		
Independent gain from East Devon Alliance		Swing		

=== 2019-2023 ===
Feniton By-Election 8 July 2021
Party	Candidate	Votes	%	±%
Conservative	Alasdair Bruce	239	53.5	
Labour	Linda Baden	126	28.2	
Liberal Democrats	Todd Olive	82	18.3	
Majority		113	25.3	
Turnout		447	21.0	
Conservative gain from Independent		Swing		

Honiton St Michael's By-Election 8 July 2021
Party	Candidate	Votes	%	±%
Labour	Jake Bonetta	807	58.0	
Conservative	Jenny Brown	522	37.5	
Liberal Democrats	Jules Hoyles	63	4.5	
Majority		285	20.5	
Turnout		1,393	25.0	
Labour gain from Liberal Democrats		Swing		

Exe Valley By-Election 23 September 2021
Party	Candidate	Votes	%	±%
Liberal Democrats	Jamie Kemp	190	36.9	−19.8
Conservative	Kevin Wraight	164	31.8	−11.5
Labour	Michael Daniell	161	31.3	+31.3
Majority		26	5.1	−8.3
Turnout		515	26.2	−9.3
Liberal Democrats hold		Swing		

Newton Poppleford and Harpford By-Election 10 November 2022
Party	Candidate	Votes	%	±%
Independent	Chris Burhop	560	67.1	+67.1
Labour	Caleb Early	162	19.4	+19.4
Conservative	Paul Carter	113	13.5	−0.3
Majority		398	47.7	
Turnout		835		
Independent gain from East Devon Alliance		Swing		

=== 2023-2027 ===
Exmouth Brixington By-Election 2 May 2024
Party	Candidate	Votes	%	±%
Conservative	Aurora Bailey	586	37.2	
Liberal Democrats	Dianne Conduit	513	32.6	
Labour	Julie Bennett	339	21.5	
Green	Michael Rosser	136	8.6	
Majority		73	4.6	
Turnout		1,574		
Conservative hold		Swing		

Exe Valley By-Election 13 March 2025
Party	Candidate	Votes	%	±%
Liberal Democrats	Fabian King	256	44.0	−26.5
Conservative	Patsy Hayman	137	23.5	−6.0
Reform	Nat Vanstone	135	23.2	+23.2
Labour	Julie Bennett	54	9.3	+9.3
Majority		119	20.4	
Turnout		582		
Liberal Democrats hold		Swing		

Exmouth Halsdon By-Election 4 December 2025
Party	Candidate	Votes	%	±%
Liberal Democrats	Fran McElhone	551	35.9	
Reform	Tony Quinn	438	28.5	
Conservative	Paula Burtoft	393	25.6	
Green	Tony Woodward	153	10.0	
Majority		113	7.4	
Turnout		1,539	25.5	
Registered electors		6,045		
Liberal Democrats hold		Swing		

Seaton By-Election 11 December 2025
Party	Candidate	Votes	%	±%
Liberal Democrats	Steve Hunt	789	41.3	+21.2
Reform	Simon Day	565	29.6	N/A
Conservative	Karen Boyes	400	20.9	−9.5
Independent	Paul Johns	156	8.2	N/A
Majority		224	11.6	N/A
Turnout		1,919	32.0	−4.3
Registered electors		6,042		
Liberal Democrats gain from Conservative		Swing		

Exmouth Brixington By-Election 23 July 2026
Party	Candidate	Votes	%	±%
Conservative	Lee Mason	537	35.2	
Liberal Democrats	Andrew Colman	450	29.5	
Reform	Paul Thomas	439	28.7	
Green	Mike Rosser	101	6.6	
Majority		87	5.7	
Turnout		1,517		
Conservative hold		Swing		

Honiton St Michael's By-Election 13 August 2026
Party	Candidate	Votes	%	±%
Liberal Democrats	Rhys Wallis	727	45.4	
Reform	Humphrey Clemens	401	25.0	
Conservative	Paul Carter	326	20.3	
Independent	Jo Fotheringham	74	4.6	
Labour	Jack Stacey	55	3.4	
Independent	John Taylor	19	1.2	
Majority		326	20.3	
Turnout		1,602		
Liberal Democrats gain from Labour		Swing		
