= 2019 East Devon District Council election =

2019 UK local government election

← 2015	2 May 2019	2023 →

All 60 seats to East Devon District Council 31 seats needed for a majority

	First party	Second party	Third party
Party	Conservative	Independent	East Devon Alliance
Last election	37 seats, 47.2%	6 seats, 9.2%	10 seats, 20.0%
Seats won	20	19	11
Seat change	▼17	▲13	▲1
Popular vote	28,388	18,542	10,991
Percentage	36.2%	23.6%	14.0%
Swing	▼11.0%	▲14.4%	▼6.0%
	Fourth party	Fifth party
Party	Liberal Democrats	Green
Last election	6 seats, 12.8%	0 seats, 3.1%
Seats won	8	2
Seat change	▲2	▲2
Popular vote	12,042	2,667
Percentage	15.3%	3.4%
Swing	▲2.5%	▲0.3%
- Winner of each seat at the 2019 East Devon District Council election
Council control before election
Conservative
Council control after election
No overall control

The 2019 East Devon District Council election took place on 2 May 2019 to elect members of East Devon District Council in England. This was on the same day as other local elections. The whole council was elected on new ward boundaries that increased the number of seats from 59 to 60.

== Summary ==
=== Election result ===
2019 East Devon District Council election
Party	Candidates	Seats	Gains	Losses	Net gain/loss	Seats %	Votes %	Votes	+/−
Conservative	55	20	N/A	N/A	▼17	33.3	36.2	28,388	–11.0
Independent	21	19	N/A	N/A	▲13	31.7	23.6	18,542	+14.4
East Devon Alliance	11	11	N/A	N/A	▲1	18.3	14.0	10,991	–6.0
Liberal Democrats	30	8	N/A	N/A	▲2	13.3	15.3	12,042	+2.5
Green	4	2	N/A	N/A	▲2	3.3	3.4	2,667	+0.3
Labour	21	0	N/A	N/A	Steady	0.0	6.3	4,974	+3.3
UKIP	2	0	N/A	N/A	Steady	0.0	1.1	887	–3.6

== Ward results ==
=== Axminster ===
Axminster
Party	Candidate	Votes	%	±%
East Devon Alliance	Sarah Jackson	1,001	46.1	
Conservative	Ian Hall	818	37.7	
Conservative	Andrew Moulding	740	34.1	
Conservative	Steve Holt	640	29.5	
Liberal Democrats	Douglas Hull	560	25.8	
Liberal Democrats	Susan Kerr	429	19.8	
Labour	Jeremy Walden	403	18.6	
Liberal Democrats	Martin Spurway	357	16.5	
Labour	Elizabeth Pole	306	14.1	
Labour	Martin Mynard	262	12.1	
Majority		100	4.6	
Turnout		2,186	35	
East Devon Alliance win (new seat)				
Conservative win (new seat)				
Conservative win (new seat)				

=== Beer & Branscombe ===
Beer & Branscombe
Party	Candidate	Votes	%	±%
Independent	Geoff Pook	601	85.0	
Labour	John Gregory	106	15.0	
Majority		495	70.0	
Turnout		724	32.99	
Independent win (new seat)				

=== Broadclyst ===
Broadclyst
Party	Candidate	Votes	%	±%
Liberal Democrats	Sarah Chamberlain	612	51.2	
Liberal Democrats	Eleanor Rylance	555	46.4	
Conservative	Chris Pepper	506	42.3	
Green	Henry Gent	426	35.6	
Liberal Democrats	Rebecca-Jayne Lipscombe	397	33.2	
Conservative	Rob Longhurst	345	28.9	
Conservative	Paul Diviani	319	26.7	
Majority		80	6.7	
Turnout		1,225	29.01	
Liberal Democrats win (new seat)				
Liberal Democrats win (new seat)				
Conservative win (new seat)				

=== Budleigh & Raleigh ===
Budleigh & Raleigh
Party	Candidate	Votes	%	±%
Independent	Paul Jarvis	1,187	44.2	
Conservative	Alan Dent	1,112	41.4	
Conservative	Thomas Wright	999	37.2	
Conservative	Patsy Hayman	982	36.5	
Green	Pete Duke	971	36.1	
Liberal Democrats	Penny Lewis	907	33.8	
UKIP	Brigitte Graham	518	19.3	
Majority		17	0.7	
Turnout		2,698	41.03	
Independent win (new seat)				
Conservative win (new seat)				
Conservative win (new seat)				

=== Clyst Valley ===
Clyst Valley
Party	Candidate	Votes	%	±%
Conservative	Mike Howe	Unopposed	N/A	
Majority		N/A	N/A	
Turnout		N/A	N/A	
Conservative win (new seat)				

=== Coly Valley ===
Coly Valley
Party	Candidate	Votes	%	±%
East Devon Alliance	Paul Arnott	938	55.6	
Conservative	Helen Parr	851	50.4	
Conservative	Andrew Pearsall	625	37.0	
Labour	Carol Dawson	382	22.6	
Majority		226	13.4	
Turnout		1,704	43.53	
East Devon Alliance win (new seat)				
Conservative win (new seat)				

=== Cranbrook ===
Cranbrook
Party	Candidate	Votes	%	±%
Independent	Kim Bloxham	506	62.4	
Independent	Kevin Blakey	427	52.7	
Independent	Sam Hawkins	392	48.3	
Conservative	Matthew Osborn	228	28.1	
Conservative	Nick Partridge	221	27.3	
Liberal Democrats	Pauline Garbutt	153	18.9	
Labour	Sue Mills	144	17.8	
Majority		164	20.2	
Turnout		818	25.45	
Independent win (new seat)				
Independent win (new seat)				
Independent win (new seat)				

=== Dunkeswell & Otterhead ===
Dunkeswell & Otterhead
Party	Candidate	Votes	%	±%
Conservative	David Key	842	55.9	
Conservative	Colin Brown	817	54.2	
Liberal Democrats	Karen Hoyles	537	35.6	
Labour	Stephen Kolek	310	20.6	
Majority		280	18.6	
Turnout		1,547	33.70	
Conservative win (new seat)				
Conservative win (new seat)				

=== Exe Valley ===
Exe Valley
Party	Candidate	Votes	%	±%
Liberal Democrats	Fabian King	378	56.7	
Conservative	Kevin Wraight	289	43.3	
Majority		89	13.4	
Turnout		683	35.50	
Liberal Democrats win (new seat)				

=== Exmouth Brixington ===
Exmouth Brixington
Party	Candidate	Votes	%	±%
Conservative	Maddy Chapman	662	47.0	
Liberal Democrats	Andrew Colman	652	46.2	
Conservative	Fred Caygill	633	44.9	
Conservative	Cherry Nicholas	632	44.8	
Liberal Democrats	Aurora Bailey	627	44.5	
Labour	Dilys Hadley	381	27.0	
Majority		1	0.1	
Turnout		1,458	23.16	
Conservative win (new seat)				
Liberal Democrats win (new seat)				
Conservative win (new seat)				

=== Exmouth Halsdon ===
Exmouth Halsdon
Party	Candidate	Votes	%	±%
Independent	Megan Armstrong	1,293	69.2	
Independent	Paul Millar	1,140	61.0	
Green	Tony Woodward	647	34.6	
Conservative	Jill Elson	475	25.4	
Conservative	Tony Hill	380	20.3	
Liberal Democrats	Andrew Toye	289	15.5	
Liberal Democrats	Brian Toye	260	13.9	
Majority		172	9.2	
Turnout		1,882	30.99	
Independent win (new seat)				
Independent win (new seat)				
Green win (new seat)				

=== Exmouth Littleham ===
Exmouth Littleham
Party	Candidate	Votes	%	±%
Independent	Chris Wright	1,071	50.4	
Independent	Nick Hookway	996	46.8	
Conservative	Bruce de Saram	606	28.5	
Conservative	Alan Whipps	536	25.2	
Conservative	Joy Whipps	534	25.1	
Liberal Democrats	Ono Olmedo	477	22.4	
Liberal Democrats	Brian Bailey	467	22.0	
Liberal Democrats	David Poor	434	20.4	
Labour	Keith Edwards	328	15.4	
Majority		70	3.3	
Turnout		2,160	32.89	
Independent win (new seat)				
Independent win (new seat)				
Conservative win (new seat)				

=== Exmouth Town ===
Exmouth Town
Party	Candidate	Votes	%	±%
Independent	Joe Whibley	664	46.3	
Green	Olly Davey	623	43.4	
Liberal Democrats	Eileen Wragg	527	36.7	
Liberal Democrats	Tim Dumper	488	34.0	
Liberal Democrats	Alexandra Sadiq	434	30.2	
Labour	Daniel Wilson	265	18.5	
Conservative	Steve Hall	235	16.4	
Conservative	Eden Smith	223	15.5	
Conservative	David Walsh	210	14.6	
Majority		39	2.7	
Turnout		1,452	25.23	
Independent win (new seat)				
Green win (new seat)				
Liberal Democrats win (new seat)				

=== Exmouth Withycombe Raleigh ===
Exmouth Withycombe Raleigh
Party	Candidate	Votes	%	±%
Liberal Democrats	Steve Gazzard	Unopposed	N/A	
Liberal Democrats	Brenda Taylor	Unopposed	N/A	
Majority		N/A	N/A	
Turnout		N/A	N/A	
Liberal Democrats win (new seat)				
Liberal Democrats win (new seat)				

=== Feniton ===
Feniton
Party	Candidate	Votes	%	±%
Independent	Susie Bond	638	82.6	
Conservative	John Tristram	97	12.6	
Labour	Adam Powell	37	4.8	
Majority		541	70.0	
Turnout		778	39.83	
Independent win (new seat)				

=== Honiton St Michael's ===
Honiton St Michael's
Party	Candidate	Votes	%	±%
Conservative	Phil Twiss	790	57.0	
Conservative	Mike Allen	763	55.0	
Liberal Democrats	Luke Jeffery	700	50.5	
Conservative	John Zarczynski	530	38.2	
Majority		170	12.3	
Turnout		1,428	25	
Conservative win (new seat)				
Conservative win (new seat)				
Liberal Democrats win (new seat)				

=== Honiton St Paul's ===
Honiton St Paul's
Party	Candidate	Votes	%	±%
Independent	Tony McCollum	632	54.8	
Conservative	Dean Barrow	385	33.4	
Conservative	Jenny Brown	384	33.3	
Liberal Democrats	Jules Hoyles	300	26.0	
Labour	Sally Boom	226	19.6	
Majority		1	0.1	
Turnout		1,175	30	
Independent win (new seat)				
Conservative win (new seat)				

=== Newbridges ===
Newbridges
Party	Candidate	Votes	%	±%
Conservative	Iain Chubb	617	74.1	
Labour	George Neate	216	25.9	
Majority		401	48.2	
Turnout		874	42.59	
Conservative win (new seat)				

=== Newton Poppleford & Harpford ===
Newton Poppleford & Harpford
Party	Candidate	Votes	%	±%
East Devon Alliance	Val Ranger	710	86.2	
Conservative	David Atkins	114	13.8	
Majority		596	72.4	
Turnout		817	44.98	
East Devon Alliance win (new seat)				

=== Ottery St Mary ===
Ottery St Mary
Party	Candidate	Votes	%	±%
Independent	Vicky Johns	1,501	67.7	
Independent	Geoff Pratt	1,044	47.1	
Independent	Peter Faithfull	878	39.6	
Conservative	Paul Carter	477	21.5	
Conservative	Anne Edwards	428	19.3	
Independent	Harv Sethi	422	19.0	
Labour	Luke Gray	381	17.2	
Conservative	Margaret Piper	245	11.1	
Majority		401	18.1	
Turnout		2,238	37.81	
Independent win (new seat)				
Independent win (new seat)				
Independent win (new seat)				

=== Seaton ===
Seaton
Party	Candidate	Votes	%	±%
East Devon Alliance	Dan Ledger	1,561	64.9	
East Devon Alliance	Jack Rowland	1,392	57.9	
Conservative	Mark Hartnell	1,095	45.5	
Liberal Democrats	Peter Burrows	515	21.4	
Conservative	Jacquie Russell	504	20.9	
Liberal Democrats	Juliette Williams	300	12.5	
Labour	Abi Jones	298	12.4	
Liberal Democrats	Terry Burrows	257	10.7	
Majority		580	24.1	
Turnout		2,414	40	
East Devon Alliance win (new seat)				
East Devon Alliance win (new seat)				
Conservative win (new seat)				

=== Sidmouth Rural ===
Sidmouth Rural
Party	Candidate	Votes	%	±%
East Devon Alliance	John Loudoun	375	42.3	
Independent	David Barratt	258	29.1	
Conservative	Chris Wale	184	20.8	
Liberal Democrats	Lewis Ragbourn	42	4.7	
Labour	Ray Davison	27	3.0	
Majority		117	13.2	
Turnout		897	46.97	
East Devon Alliance win (new seat)				

=== Sidmouth Sidford ===
Sidmouth Sidford
Party	Candidate	Votes	%	±%
East Devon Alliance	Marianne Rixson	1,326	73.5	
East Devon Alliance	Dawn Manley	1,303	72.3	
Conservative	Stuart Hughes	1,089	60.4	
Conservative	Jenny Ware	757	42.0	
Conservative	Zachary Marsh	721	40.0	
Labour	Colin Mills	381	21.1	
UKIP	Ken Warren	369	20.5	
Majority		332	18.4	
Turnout		1,809	28.02	
East Devon Alliance win (new seat)				
East Devon Alliance win (new seat)				
Conservative win (new seat)				

=== Sidmouth Town ===
Sidmouth Town
Party	Candidate	Votes	%	±%
East Devon Alliance	Cathy Gardner	971	60.6	
East Devon Alliance	Denise Bickley	922	57.5	
Conservative	Sheila Kerridge	549	34.2	
Conservative	Timothy Venner	409	25.5	
Labour	Nicholas Diprose	127	7.9	
Majority		373	23.3	
Turnout		1,617	40.54	
East Devon Alliance win (new seat)				
East Devon Alliance win (new seat)				

=== Tale Vale ===
Tale Vale
Party	Candidate	Votes	%	±%
Conservative	Philip Skinner	436	48.1	
Liberal Democrats	Mike Gray	378	41.7	
Labour	Chris East	92	10.2	
Majority		58	6.4	
Turnout		928	43.12	
Conservative win (new seat)				

=== Trinity ===
Trinity
Party	Candidate	Votes	%	±%
Conservative	Ian Thomas	635	71.8	
Labour	Sarah Birnie	249	28.2	
Majority		386	43.6	
Turnout		920	42.42	
Conservative win (new seat)				

=== West Hill & Aylesbeare ===
West Hill & Aylesbeare
Party	Candidate	Votes	%	±%
Independent	Jess Bailey	956	77.0	
Conservative	John Sheaves	285	23.0	
Majority		671	54.0	
Turnout		1,246	57.13	
Independent win (new seat)				

=== Whimple & Rockbeare ===
Whimple & Rockbeare
Party	Candidate	Votes	%	±%
Independent	Kathy McLauchlan	702	75.0	
Conservative	Mark Evans-Martin	234	25.0	
Majority		468	50.0	
Turnout		941	42.88	
Independent win (new seat)				

=== Woodbury & Lympstone ===
Woodbury & Lympstone
Party	Candidate	Votes	%	±%
Independent	Ben Ingham	1,453	76.0	
Independent	Geoff Jung	1,396	73.0	
Conservative	Cheryl McGauley	432	22.6	
Conservative	William Carter	383	20.0	
Majority		964	50.4	
Turnout		1,923	45.09	
Independent win (new seat)				
Independent win (new seat)				

=== Yarty ===
Yarty
Party	Candidate	Votes	%	±%
East Devon Alliance	Paul Hayward	492	52.3	
Conservative	Alasdair Bruce	296	31.5	
Liberal Democrats	Gillian Jordan	99	10.5	
Labour	Diane Cheshire	53	5.6	
Majority		196	20.8	
Turnout		951	44.90	
East Devon Alliance win (new seat)				

== By-elections ==
=== Whimple and Rockbeare ===
Whimple and Rockbeare: 6 May 2021
Party	Candidate	Votes	%	±%
Conservative	Richard Lawrence	502	56.2	+31.2
Liberal Democrats	Todd Olive	392	43.8	N/A
Majority		110	12.4	
Turnout		894		
Conservative gain from Independent		Swing	▲6.3	

The Whimple and Rockbeare by-election was triggered by the resignation of independent councillor Kathy McLauchlan.

=== Feniton ===
Feniton: 8 July 2021
Party	Candidate	Votes	%	±%
Conservative	Alasdair Bruce	239		
Labour	Linda Baden	126		
Liberal Democrats	Todd Olive	82		
Turnout			21	
Conservative gain from Independent		Swing		

The Feniton by-election was triggered by the resignation of independent councillor Sue Bond.

=== Honiton St Michael's ===
Honiton St Michael's: 8 July 2021
Party	Candidate	Votes	%	±%
Labour	Jake Bonetta	807	58.0	New
Conservative	Jenny Brown	522	37.5	−0.7
Liberal Democrats	Jules Hoyles	63	4.5	−46.0
Majority		285	20.5	N/A
Turnout		1392	24.4	
Labour gain from Liberal Democrats		Swing	▲58.0	

The Honiton St Michael's by-election was triggered by the resignation of Liberal Democrat councillor Luke Jeffery.

=== Exe Valley ===
Exe Valley: 23 September 2021
Party	Candidate	Votes	%	±%
Liberal Democrats	Jamie Kemp	190	36.9	−19.8
Conservative	Kevin Wraight	164	31.8	−11.5
Labour	Michael Daniell	161	31.3	N/A
Majority		26	5.1	
Turnout		517	26.2	
Liberal Democrats hold		Swing	▼4.2	

The Exe Valley by-election was triggered by the resignation of Liberal Democrat councillor Fabian King.

=== Newton Poppleford ===
Newton Poppleford: 10 November 2022
Party	Candidate	Votes	%	±%
Independent	Chris Burhop	560		
Labour	Caleb Early	162		
Conservative	Paul Carter	113		
Turnout			46	
Independent gain from East Devon Alliance		Swing		

The Newton Poppleford by-election was triggered by the death of East Devon Alliance councillor Val Ranger.
