= 2017 Devon County Council election =

2017 UK local government election

- 4 May 2017

All 60 seats to Devon County Council 31 seats needed for a majority
- Registered: 601,797
- Turnout: 241,924; 40.2% (▲6.9 pp)
	First party	Second party	Third party
Party	Conservative	Liberal Democrats	Labour
Last election	38 seats, 35.3%	9 seats, 16.0%	7 seats, 13.2%
Seats before	38	9	7
Seats won	42	7	7
Seat change	▲4	▼2	Steady
Popular vote	98,278	48,022	33,571
Percentage	44.4%	21.7%	15.2%
	Fourth party	Fifth party	Sixth party
Party	Independent	Green	UKIP
Last election	3 seats, 5.6%	1 seat, 6.5%	4 seats, 23.0%
Seats before		1	4
Seats won	3 (Note: Totals include the East Devon Alliance.)	1	0
Seat change	Steady	Steady	▼4
Popular vote	21,336	11,928	9,629
Percentage	9.6%	5.4%	4.4%
- Map of the results of the 2017 Devon council election.
Council control before election
Conservative
Council control after election
Conservative

The 2017 Devon County Council election took place on 4 May 2017 as part of the 2017 local elections in the United Kingdom. All 60 councillors were elected from 58 electoral divisions, which returned either one or two county councillors each by first-past-the-post voting for a four-year term of office.

Boundary changes to the electoral divisions took effect at this election after a review of the county by the Local Government Boundary Commission for England.

== Election result by division ==
=== Alphington and Cowick ===
Alphington and Cowick
Party	Candidate	Votes	%	±%
Labour	Yvonne Atkinson	1,980	43.3	+8.4
Conservative	Alex Traves	1,558	34.1	+20.6
Liberal Democrats	Rod Ruffle	617	13.5	−12.9
Green	Andrew Wallace Bell	280	6.1	+1.4
UKIP	Dutch Dudgeon	126	2.8	−17.5
Majority		422	9.2	+0.7
Turnout		4,572	41.4	+8.9
Labour hold		Swing		

=== Ashburton and Buckfastleigh ===
Ashburton and Buckfastleigh
Party	Candidate	Votes	%	±%
Conservative	Stuart Denis Barker	1,489	36.4	−0.2
Liberal Democrats	John Nutley	1,466	35.9	+23.3
Independent	Ronald Edward Paul Fox	666	16.3	N/A
Labour	Helen Lorna McGechie	342	8.4	−4.2
UKIP	Bruce Andrew Meechan	113	2.8	−17.6
Majority		23	0.6	−15.6
Turnout		4,087	41.6	+8.1
Conservative hold		Swing		

=== Axminster ===
Axminster
Party	Candidate	Votes	%	±%
Conservative	Ian L Hall	1,741	47.1	N/C
East Devon Alliance	Paul G Hayward	1,322	35.8	+4.7
Liberal Democrats	Bill Foster	320	8.7	−0.2
Labour	Jeremy W Walden	306	8.3	+1.9
Majority		419	11.3	−10.4
Turnout		3,693	39.5	+3.3
Conservative hold		Swing		

=== Barnstaple North ===
Barnstaple North
Party	Candidate	Votes	%	±%
Liberal Democrats	Brian Carol Greenslade	1,759	52.7	+22.2
Conservative	David William Hoare	780	23.4	+2.0
Labour	Roy Ernest Tomlinson	304	9.1	+0.8
UKIP	Andy Norden	252	7.5	−11.7
Green	Ricky Knight	238	7.1	−9.6
Majority		979	29.3	+20.2
Turnout		3,338	31.8	+2.9
Liberal Democrats hold		Swing		

=== Barnstaple South ===
Barnstaple South
Party	Candidate	Votes	%	±%
Conservative	John Vincent Mathews	1,585	44.6	+13.0
Liberal Democrats	David Nigel Chalmers	1,215	34.2	+6.9
Labour	Laurence Overend	344	9.7	+0.3
UKIP	Steve Crowther	228	6.4	−18.7
Green	Matt Chamings	178	5.0	−1.1
Majority		370	10.4	+6.1
Turnout		3,555	34.6	+5.2
Conservative hold		Swing		

=== Bickleigh and Wembury ===
Bickleigh and Wembury
Party	Candidate	Votes	%	±%
Conservative	John Hart	2,276	71.4	+11.8
Labour	John Harvey	360	11.3	N/A
Liberal Democrats	Caroline Voaden	304	9.5	−1.6
Green	Coral Smith	236	7.4	N/A
Majority		1,916	60.1	+28.9
Turnout		3,186	34.1	+4.4
Conservative hold		Swing		

=== Bideford East ===
Bideford East
Party	Candidate	Votes	%	±%
Conservative	Linda Joan Hellyer	938	29.9	+0.6
Labour Co-op	David George Brenton	626	19.9	+0.2
Independent	Phil Pennington	546	17.4	N/A
UKIP	Sam Robinson	444	14.1	−16.4
Liberal Democrats	Robert Ivor Wootton	311	9.9	−4.0
Green	Will Douglas-Mann	189	6.0	−0.2
No description	Stephen Barnes	78	2.5	N/A
Majority		312	10.0	
Turnout		3,139	31.6	+4.7
Conservative gain from UKIP		Swing		

=== Bideford West and Hartland ===
Bideford West and Hartland
Party	Candidate	Votes	%	±%
Conservative	Tony Inch	1,223	42.4	
UKIP	Robin Julian	589	20.4	
Liberal Democrats	Stephen Potts	556	19.3	
Labour	Anne Brenton	509	17.6	
Majority		634	22.0	
Turnout		2,886	32.3	
Conservative win (new seat)				

=== Bovey Rural ===
Bovey Rural
Party	Candidate	Votes	%	±%
Conservative	George John Gribble	2,149	49.9	+3.0
Liberal Democrats	Sally Angela Morgan	1,365	31.7	+17.4
Labour	Lisa Collette Robillard Webb	307	7.1	−4.3
Independent	Eoghan Eamon Kelly	194	4.5	N/A
Green	Roger Haworth	166	3.9	−1.3
UKIP	Graham John Walker	118	2.7	−19.4
Majority		784	18.2	−6.6
Turnout		4,304	43.7	+4.3
Conservative hold		Swing		

=== Braunton Rural ===
Braunton Rural
Party	Candidate	Votes	%
Conservative	Caroline Jean Chugg	1,479	40.7
Liberal Democrats	Liz Spear	1,219	33.5
Labour	Mark Michael Robert Cann	670	18.4
UKIP	Rob McConnell	247	6.8
Majority		260	7.2
Turnout		3,634	38.9
Conservative hold			

=== Broadclyst ===
Broadclyst (2 seats)
Party	Candidate	Votes	%
Conservative	Ray Bloxham	1,652	48.0
Conservative	Sara M Randall Johnson	1,516	44.1
Liberal Democrats	Eleanor A C Rylance	839	24.4
Green	Henry F Gent	679	19.7
Liberal Democrats	Peter M Hook	515	15.0
Labour	Jan Ross	411	12.0
Labour	Sue Mills	406	11.8
Independent	Eileen Lascelles	359	10.4
Turnout		3,454	45.7
Conservative win (new seat)			
Conservative win (new seat)			

- Two councillors elected for this division

=== Chudleigh and Teign Valley ===
Chudleigh and Teign Valley
Party	Candidate	Votes	%
Conservative	Jerry Brook	2,044	49.6
Liberal Democrats	Richard Michael Keeling	1,553	37.7
Labour	Anthony Krys	288	7.0
Green	Katie Anne Reville	226	5.5
Majority		491	11.9
Turnout		4,120	40.9
Conservative win (new seat)			

=== Chulmleigh and Landkey ===
Chulmleigh and Landkey
Party	Candidate	Votes	%
Conservative	Richard Colin Edgell	1,849	59.0
Liberal Democrats	David John Worden	884	28.2
Green	Lucie Catherine Puttipap	200	6.4
Labour	Marion Elizabeth Mason	194	6.2
Majority		965	30.8
Turnout		3,132	41.3
Conservative win (new seat)			

=== Combe Martin Rural ===
Combe Martin Rural
Party	Candidate	Votes	%
Conservative	Andrea Vivienne Davis	2,278	63.1
Liberal Democrats	Sue Haywood	562	15.6
Labour	Oliver John Leslie Bell	308	8.5
Green	Kyle James Chivers	290	8.0
UKIP	Jon Irving-Bell	165	4.6
Majority		1,716	47.5
Turnout		3,609	37.0
Conservative hold			

=== Crediton ===
Crediton
Party	Candidate	Votes	%
Liberal Democrats	Nick Way	2,093	48.8
Conservative	Clive Eginton	1,679	39.1
Labour	Susan Macrow-Hill	271	6.3
UKIP	Mike Szabo	238	5.5
Majority		414	9.7
Turnout		4,289	43.2
Liberal Democrats hold			

=== Creedy Taw and Mid Exe ===
Creedy Taw and Mid Exe
Party	Candidate	Votes	%
Conservative	Margaret Squires	2,622	53.4
Liberal Democrats	Frank William Letch	1,194	24.3
Labour	John Ross	402	8.2
Green	Paul Anthony Edwards	310	6.3
UKIP	Tim Matthews	262	5.3
Majority		1,428	29.1
Turnout		4,914	45.7
Conservative win (new seat)			

=== Cullompton and Bradninch ===
Cullompton and Bradninch
Party	Candidate	Votes	%
Conservative	John Berry	1,499	44.3
Liberal Democrats	Luke Daniel Taylor	810	24.0
Independent	David Follett Pugsley	478	14.1
Labour	Danny Barnes	332	9.8
UKIP	William Oliver Jones	185	5.5
Green	Gillian Margaret Westcott	70	2.1
Majority		689	20.4
Turnout		3,380	35.4
Conservative win (new seat)			

=== Dartmouth and Marldon ===
Dartmouth and Marldon
Party	Candidate	Votes	%
Conservative	Jonathan Hawkins	2,292	66.3
Liberal Democrats	Susie Jackson	456	13.2
Green	Heather Nicholson	360	10.4
Labour	Tessa Lannin	344	9.9
Majority		1,836	53.1
Turnout		3,459	36.1
Conservative win (new seat)			

=== Dawlish ===
Dawlish
Party	Candidate	Votes	%
Conservative	John Clatworthy	2,407	51.8
Liberal Democrats	Martin Wrigley	1,479	31.9
Labour Co-op	Christina Doyle	453	9.8
UKIP	David Antony Gunn	300	6.5
Majority		928	20.0
Turnout		4,643	39.5
Conservative hold			

=== Duryard and Pennsylvania ===
Duryard and Pennsylvania
Party	Candidate	Votes	%
Conservative	Percy Prowse	1,666	46.8
Labour	Jane Begley	1,130	31.8
Liberal Democrats	Michael Norman Mitchell	488	13.7
Green	Lizzie Woodman	204	5.7
UKIP	Sallie Cherie Waters	65	1.8
Majority		536	15.1
Turnout		3,557	47.5
Conservative hold			

=== Exminster and Haldon ===
Exminster and Haldon
Party	Candidate	Votes	%
Liberal Democrats	Alan Michael Connett	2,130	51.5
Conservative	Kevin Andrew Lake	1,510	36.5
Green	Andy Bragg	212	5.1
Labour	Sarah Elizabeth Krys	198	4.8
UKIP	Bob Edwards	82	2.0
Majority		620	15.0
Turnout		4,135	46.7
Liberal Democrats win (new seat)			

=== Exmouth ===
Exmouth (2 seats)
Party	Candidate	Votes	%
Conservative	Richard Scott	2,849	35.6
Conservative	Jeff Trail	2,725	34.0
Independent	Ben Ingham	2,199	27.5
Liberal Democrats	Eileen E Wragg	2,117	26.4
Liberal Democrats	Tim Dumper	1,719	21.5
UKIP	Brigitte Graham	799	10.0
Green	Robert N Masding	755	9.4
Labour	Dilys Hadley	700	8.7
Green	Oliver Davey	692	8.6
Labour	Pete Money	645	8.1
Turnout		8,013	31.4
Conservative win (new seat)			
Conservative win (new seat)			

- Two councillors elected for this division

=== Exmouth and Budleigh Salterton Coastal ===
Exmouth and Budleigh Salterton Coastal
Party	Candidate	Votes	%
Conservative	Christine Channon	2,456	54.7
Liberal Democrats	Steve Gazzard	960	21.4
Labour	Keith Edwards	448	10.0
UKIP	Gavin Graham	277	6.2
Green	Mike Rosser	246	5.5
Liberal	Harry J Tribble	87	1.9
Majority		1,496	33.3
Turnout		4,491	38.5
Conservative win (new seat)			

=== Exwick and St. Thomas ===
Exwick and St. Thomas
Party	Candidate	Votes	%
Labour	Rob Hannaford	2,089	57.3
Conservative	Azhar-Jamal Chaudhry	776	21.3
Green	Joe Levy	311	8.5
Liberal Democrats	Christine Vince	241	6.6
UKIP	Lawrence Simon Harper	216	5.9
Majority		1,313	36.0
Turnout		3,644	36.1
Labour hold			

=== Feniton and Honiton ===
Feniton and Honiton
Party	Candidate	Votes	%
Conservative	Phil Twiss	1,879	61.1
Labour	Andrew V Blackwell	543	17.7
Liberal Democrats	David N Cox	371	12.1
UKIP	Graham L Smith	269	8.8
Majority		1,336	43.5
Turnout		3,073	27.1
Conservative win (new seat)			

=== Fremington Rural ===
Fremington Rural
Party	Candidate	Votes	%
Independent	Frank Lindsay Biederman	2,202	55.8
Conservative	Rodney Sheridan	1,108	28.1
Liberal Democrats	Julie Sheelagh Adnams Hatch	327	8.3
Labour	Ian Crawford	124	3.1
UKIP	Pauline Lesley Davies	101	2.6
Green	Phillip Wearne	76	1.9
Majority		1,094	27.7
Turnout		3,943	45.6
Independent hold			

=== Hatherleigh and Chagford ===
Hatherleigh and Chagford
Party	Candidate	Votes	%
Conservative	James Raymond McInnes	2,615	62.6
Liberal Democrats	Ross Anthony Wolverson	543	13.0
Green	David Osbiston	444	10.6
Labour	Paula Louise Frisby	384	9.2
UKIP	Bob Rush	190	4.5
Majority		2,072	49.6
Turnout		4,179	40.8
Conservative hold			

=== Heavitree and Whipton Barton ===
Heavitree and Whipton Barton
Party	Candidate	Votes	%
Labour	Emma Brennan	2,151	51.2
Conservative	Emily Jane Croft	1,317	31.4
Liberal Democrats	Gerald Pryke	283	6.7
Green	Kay Powell	249	5.9
UKIP	Robert James Sheridan	192	4.6
Majority		834	19.9
Turnout		4,200	41.0
Labour hold			

=== Holsworthy Rural ===
Holsworthy Rural
Party	Candidate	Votes	%
Conservative	Barry Michael Parsons	3,185	67.2
Liberal Democrats	Caroline Frances Herringham Leaver	574	12.1
UKIP	Nigel Andrew Johnson	536	11.3
Labour	Vivian George Gale	439	9.3
Majority		2,611	55.0
Turnout		4,743	38.4
Conservative hold			

=== Ilfracombe ===
Ilfracombe
Party	Candidate	Votes	%
Conservative	Paul Edward Crabb	1,173	38.1
Green	Netti Pearson	822	26.7
Independent	Mike Edmunds	704	22.9
Labour	Toby Ebert	256	8.3
UKIP	Stuart Robertson	122	4.0
Majority		351	11.4
Turnout		3,078	34.9
Conservative gain from Independent			

=== Ipplepen and The Kerswells ===
Ipplepen and The Kerswells
Party	Candidate	Votes	%
Liberal Democrats	Alistair Dewhirst	2,128	46.0
Conservative	Chris Clarance	2,043	44.2
Green	Amy Caroline Walkden	160	3.5
Labour	Adam Matthew Benedict Bell	147	3.2
UKIP	Gerrie Williams	137	3.0
Majority		85	1.8
Turnout		4,626	44.8
Liberal Democrats win (new seat)			

=== Ivybridge ===
Ivybridge
Party	Candidate	Votes	%
Conservative	Roger Frederick Croad	1,751	55.7
Labour	Tony Rea	852	27.1
Liberal Democrats	Laurel Lawford	190	6.0
UKIP	Ian Ross	186	5.9
Green	Phil Picton	163	5.2
Majority		899	28.6
Turnout		3,145	35.2
Conservative hold			

=== Kingsbridge ===
Kingsbridge
Party	Candidate	Votes	%
Liberal Democrats	Julian Brazil	2,265	51.2
Conservative	Josh Gardner	1,845	41.7
Labour	Gerrie Lee Messer	306	6.9
Majority		420	9.5
Turnout		4,427	42.2
Liberal Democrats win (new seat)			

=== Kingsteignton and Teign Estuary ===
Kingsteignton and Teign Estuary
Party	Candidate	Votes	%
Conservative	Ron Peart	1,911	52.3
Liberal Democrats	Dave Rollason	900	24.6
Independent	Tony Dempster	359	9.8
Labour	James William Osben	317	8.7
Green	Jennie Osborne	158	4.3
Majority		1,011	27.7
Turnout		3,656	32.6
Conservative win (new seat)			

=== Newton Abbot North ===
Newton Abbot North
Party	Candidate	Votes	%
Liberal Democrats	Jackie Brodie	1,160	38.4
Conservative	Philip Andrew Bullivant	1,023	33.9
Independent	Mike Hocking	402	13.3
Labour	Carl Alderton	254	8.4
UKIP	Steven James Harvey	161	5.3
Majority		137	4.5
Turnout		3,017	30.1
Liberal Democrats gain from Conservative			

=== Newton Abbot South ===
Newton Abbot South
Party	Candidate	Votes	%
Liberal Democrats	Gordon Nicholas Hook	2,091	61.5
Conservative	Dennis Esmond Smith	938	27.6
Labour	Jackie Jackson	272	8.0
Green	Mike Rickard	91	2.7
Majority		1,153	33.9
Turnout		3,398	35.0
Liberal Democrats hold			

=== Northam ===
Northam
Party	Candidate	Votes	%
Conservative	Andrew John Eastman	2,189	53.6
UKIP	Chris Leather	719	17.6
Labour	Stan Coates	468	11.5
Liberal Democrats	David Berryman	356	8.7
Green	Peter Graham Hames	343	8.4
Majority		1,470	36.0
Turnout		4,087	40.8
Conservative hold			

=== Okehampton Rural ===
Okehampton Rural
Party	Candidate	Votes	%
Conservative	Kevin Ball	2,008	49.2
Independent	Tony Leech	702	17.2
Labour	Caleb William Mark Stevens	538	13.2
Liberal Democrats	John Farrand-Rogers	383	9.4
Green	Sally Parkins	248	6.1
UKIP	Alan Gross	187	4.6
Majority		1,306	32.0
Turnout		4,078	35.6
Conservative hold			

=== Otter Valley ===
Otter Valley
Party	Candidate	Votes	%
Independent	Claire L Wright	3,638	74.6
Conservative	Tim Venner	1,104	22.6
Labour	George E Downs	123	2.5
Majority		2,534	52.0
Turnout		4,875	46.1
Independent win (new seat)			

=== Pinhoe and Mincinglake ===
Pinhoe and Mincinglake
Party	Candidate	Votes	%
Labour	Hilary Ackland	1,718	46.2
Conservative	Lee Mottram	1,427	38.4
Liberal Democrats	Michael Geoffrey Payne	208	5.6
UKIP	Robert Julian Ball	190	5.1
Green	Bethany Amber Payne	160	4.3
Majority		291	7.8
Turnout		3,716	39.2
Labour hold			

=== Salcombe ===
Salcombe
Party	Candidate	Votes	%
Conservative	Rufus Gilbert	2,236	61.5
Liberal Democrats	Elizabeth Dawn Huntley	895	24.6
Labour	David Trigger	271	7.5
Green	John Green	231	6.4
Majority		1,341	36.9
Turnout		3,635	40.5
Conservative win (new seat)			

=== Seaton and Colyton ===
Seaton and Colyton
Party	Candidate	Votes	%
East Devon Alliance	Martin Shaw	1,826	38.0
Conservative	Helen E Parr	1,784	37.1
Liberal Democrats	Peter W Burrows	524	10.9
Independent	Jim Knight	441	9.2
Labour	Ian J Martin	222	4.6
Majority		42	0.9
Turnout		4,810	41.0
East Devon Alliance win (new seat)			

=== Sidmouth ===
Sidmouth
Party	Candidate	Votes	%
Conservative	Stuart Hughes	2,390	47.3
East Devon Alliance	Marianne P Rixson	1,909	37.7
Liberal Democrats	Peter W Burrows	524	10.9
Independent	Jim Knight	441	9.2
Labour	Ian J Martin	222	4.6
Majority		481	9.6
Turnout		4,810	41.0
Conservative win (new seat)			

=== South Brent and Yealmpton ===
South Brent and Yealmpton
Party	Candidate	Votes	%
Conservative	Richard Hosking	2,226	51.9
Liberal Democrats	Antony David Power	1,312	30.6
Green	Marianne Tissandier	403	9.4
Labour	Lisette Mai Granados	340	7.9
Majority		914	21.3
Turnout		4,290	42.0
Conservative win (new seat)			

=== South Molton ===
South Molton
Party	Candidate	Votes	%
Conservative	Jeremy Owen Yabsley	2,217	57.9
Liberal Democrats	Matt Bushell	1,152	30.1
Labour	Steven William Hinchliffe	277	7.2
Green	Ian Derek Henry Horsnell	172	4.5
Majority		1,065	27.8
Turnout		3,827	39.1
Conservative hold			

=== St. Davids and Haven Banks ===
St. Davids and Haven Banks
Party	Candidate	Votes	%
Labour	Marilyn Carol Whitton	1,556	44.1
Conservative	Aric Samuel David Glinsky	906	25.7
Green	Diana Frances Moore	620	17.6
Liberal Democrats	Kevin Martin Chun	342	9.7
UKIP	Brian Jeffery	95	2.7
Majority		650	18.4
Turnout		3,531	36.8
Labour win (new seat)			

=== St. Sidwells and St. James ===
St. Sidwells and St. James
Party	Candidate	Votes	%
Labour	Su Aves	2,135	60.7
Conservative	Anne Margaret Jobson	734	20.9
Green	Tom Milburn	353	10.0
Liberal Democrats	Alexandra Vanessa Newcombe	285	8.1
Majority		1,401	39.8
Turnout		3,519	36.6
Labour win (new seat)			

=== Tavistock ===
Tavistock
Party	Candidate	Votes	%
Conservative	Debo Sellis	1,922	49.2
Independent	Jeff Moody	1,098	28.1
Liberal Democrats	Chris Bones	297	7.6
Labour	Roy Kendrick	249	6.4
Green	Colin Bannon	229	5.9
UKIP	Duncan Stuart Elliott Parker	110	2.8
Majority		824	21.1
Turnout		3,910	38.5
Conservative hold			

=== Teignmouth ===
Teignmouth
Party	Candidate	Votes	%
Conservative	Sylvia Russell	1,736	40.0
Liberal Democrats	Richard Younger-Ross	1,714	39.5
Labour	Lillian Chasteau	437	10.1
UKIP	Jackie Hooper	249	5.7
Green	Benjamin Stevens	193	4.5
Majority		22	0.5
Turnout		4,335	37.3
Conservative gain from Liberal Democrats			

=== Tiverton East ===
Tiverton East
Party	Candidate	Votes	%
Conservative	Colin Slade	1,253	41.5
Liberal Democrats	Kevin Wilson	912	30.2
Labour	Steve Bush	550	18.2
UKIP	Jonathan Smith	294	9.7
Majority		341	11.3
Turnout		3,018	31.5
Conservative gain from Liberal Democrats			

=== Tiverton West ===
Tiverton West
Party	Candidate	Votes	%
Conservative	Polly Colthorpe	1,624	43.6
UKIP	Ron Dolley	691	18.6
Labour	Tim Bridger	617	16.6
Liberal Democrats	Ben Holdman	392	10.5
Liberal	Jenny Roach	383	10.3
Majority		933	25.1
Turnout		3,721	35.2
Conservative hold			

=== Torrington Rural ===
Torrington Rural
Party	Candidate	Votes	%
Conservative	Andrew Saywell	1,858	40.4
Liberal Democrats	Ray Auvray	855	18.6
Labour Co-op	James Andrew Craigie	678	14.7
UKIP	Roger Darch	576	12.5
No description	Andy Boyd	369	8.0
Green	Keith Stuart Funnell	260	5.6
Majority		1,003	21.8
Turnout		4,603	41.2
Conservative hold			

=== Totnes and Dartington ===
Totnes and Dartington
Party	Candidate	Votes	%
Green	Jacqi Hodgson	1,524	34.9
Liberal Democrats	Robert Vint	1,304	29.9
Conservative	Rose Rowe	892	20.4
Labour	Evelyn Ruth Burges	546	12.5
UKIP	Alan Langmaid	96	2.2
Majority		220	5.0
Turnout		4,368	44.3
Green win (new seat)			

=== Wearside and Topsham ===
Wearside and Topsham
Party	Candidate	Votes	%
Conservative	Andrew Robert Leadbetter	2,226	54.8
Labour	Eliot Paul Wright	1,335	32.8
Liberal Democrats	Mick Craig	272	6.7
Green	Mark Shorto	227	5.6
Majority		891	21.9
Turnout		4,065	43.3
Conservative win (new seat)			

=== Whimple and Blackdown ===
Whimple and Blackdown
Party	Candidate	Votes	%
Conservative	Iain Chubb	2,716	65.5
Liberal Democrats	Jules Hoyles	973	23.5
Labour	Steve Greenway	426	10.3
Majority		1,743	42.0
Turnout		4,146	38.4
Conservative win (new seat)			

=== Willand and Uffculme ===
Willand and Uffculme
Party	Candidate	Votes	%
Conservative	Ray Radford	1,932	52.5
Liberal Democrats	Simon John Clist	805	21.9
Independent	Margaret Dennis	414	11.3
Labour	Fiona Hutton	298	8.1
Green	Jo Norton	224	6.1
Majority		1,127	30.6
Turnout		3,678	35.0
Conservative hold			

=== Wonford and St. Loyes ===
Wonford and St. Loyes
Party	Candidate	Votes	%
Labour	Marina Asvachin	1,494	47.1
Conservative	Rob Newby	1,186	37.4
Liberal Democrats	Thomas Jacob Deakin	216	6.8
Green	Lynn Susan Wetenhall	135	4.3
UKIP	Alison Jane Sheridan	132	4.2
Majority		308	9.7
Turnout		3,170	33.7
Labour win (new seat)			

=== Yelverton Rural ===
Yelverton Rural
Party	Candidate	Votes	%
Conservative	Philip Richard Sanders	2,151	45.0
Independent	Ric Cheadle	989	20.7
Green	Lucy Wood	511	10.7
Liberal Democrats	Gail Bones	438	9.2
UKIP	David Pengelly	344	7.2
Labour	Ruth Mary Craigie	332	6.9
Majority		1,162	24.3
Turnout		4,778	41.7
Conservative hold			
