= 2021 Devon County Council election =

2021 UK local government election

- 6 May 2021

All 60 seats to Devon County Council 31 seats needed for a majority
- Registered: 630,144
- Turnout: 256,335; 40.7% (▲0.5 pp)
	First party	Second party	Third party
Party	Conservative	Liberal Democrats	Labour
Last election	42 seats, 44.4%	7 seats, 21.7%	7 seats, 15.2%
Seats won	39	9	7
Seat change	▼3	▲2	Steady
Popular vote	108,702	45,395	40,640
Percentage	42.4%	17.7%	15.9%
Swing	▼2%	▼4%	▲0.7%
	Fourth party	Fifth party
Party	Independent	Green
Last election	3 seats, 9.6%	1 seats, 5.4%
Seats won	3	2
Seat change	Steady	▲1
Popular vote	27,707	28,285
Percentage	10.8%	11.0%
Swing	▲1.4%	▲5.6%
- 2021 Devon County Council Election Results Map.
Council control before election
Conservative
Council control after election
Conservative

The 2021 Devon County Council election took place alongside the other local elections. All 60 councillors to Devon County Council were elected. A total of 256,974 votes were cast including spoiled ballots.

== Summary ==
=== Election result ===
2021 Devon County Council election
Party	Candidates	Seats	Gains	Losses	Net gain/loss	Seats %	Votes %	Votes	+/−
Conservative	60	39	2	4	▼2	65.0	42.8	108,702	–1.6
Liberal Democrats	55	9	4	2	▲2	15.0	17.9	45,395	–3.8
Labour	60	7	0	0	Steady	11.7	16.0	40,640	+0.8
Independent	27	3	1	0	Steady	9.6	8.6	21,962	–1.0
Green	45	2	1	0	▲1	5.4	11.1	28,285	+4.6
East Devon Alliance	3	0	0	1	▼1	0.0	2.4	6,046	
Freedom Alliance (UK)	20	0	0	0	Steady	0.0	0.6	1,472	N/A
TUSC	6	0	0	0	Steady	0.0	0.3	671	N/A
Reform	5	0	0	0	Steady	0.0	0.2	424	N/A
For Britain	2	0	0	0	Steady	0.0	0.1	242	N/A
Women's Equality	1	0	0	0	Steady	0.0	0.1	139	N/A
The Democratic Network	1	0	0	0	Steady	0.0	<0.1	95	N/A
UKIP	1	0	0	0	Steady	0.0	<0.1	68	–4.4

== Division results ==
=== East Devon ===
==== District summary ====
East Devon district summary
Party	Seats	+/-	Votes	%	+/-
Conservative	9	Steady	25,382	45.8	+2.0
Independent	1	Steady	6,592	11.9	–1.7
Green	1	▲1	4,436	8.0	+3.4
Labour	0	Steady	7,643	13.8	+5.2
East Devon Alliance	0	▼1	6,046	10.9	+1.2
Liberal Democrats	0	Steady	4,947	8.9	–8.1
Democratic Network	0	Steady	95	0.2	N/A
Freedom Alliance	0	Steady	84	0.2	N/A
Reform UK	0	Steady	78	0.1	N/A
UKIP	1	Steady	68	0.1	–2.5
Total	11	Steady	55,371		

==== Division results ====
Axminster
Party	Candidate	Votes	%	±%
Conservative	Ian Hall	1,672	43.6	−3.5
East Devon Alliance	Paul Hayward	1,439	37.6	+1.8
Labour Co-op	Oliver Tucker	498	13.0	+4.7
Liberal Democrats	Jules Hoyles	209	5.5	−3.2
Majority		233	6.1	−5.2
Turnout		3,832	38.7	−0.8
Conservative hold				

Broadclyst
Party	Candidate	Votes	%	±%
Green	Henry Gent	1,992	45.4	+25.7
Conservative	Sara Randall Johnson	1,671	38.1	−6.0
Conservative	Tom Hobson	1,488	33.9	−14.1
Liberal Democrats	Jamie Kemp	896	20.4	−4.0
Labour	Mathieu Holladay	599	13.7	+1.7
Labour	Ellis Davies	571	13.0	+1.2
Independent	Peter Faithfull	535	12.2	N/A
Majority				
Turnout		4,413	32.0	−13.7
Green gain from Conservative				
Conservative hold				

Exmouth
Party	Candidate	Votes	%	±%
Conservative	Jeff Trail	3,727	44.1	+10.1
Conservative	Richard Scott	3,685	43.6	+8.0
Independent	Joe Whibley	2,373	28.1	N/A
Liberal Democrats	Tim Dumper	1,844	21.8	+0.3
Labour Co-op	Josie Parkhouse	1,509	17.9	+9.2
Labour Co-op	Daniel Wilson	1,224	14.5	+6.5
Green	Michael Rosser	1,214	14.4	+5.0
Majority				
Turnout		8,566	32.9	+1.5
Conservative hold				
Conservative hold				

Exmouth and Budleigh Salterton Coastal
Party	Candidate	Votes	%	±%
Conservative	Christine Channon	2,307	49.2	−5.5
Liberal Democrats	Penny Lewis	747	15.9	−5.5
Green	David Ireson	503	10.7	+5.2
Labour	Keith Edwards	478	10.2	+0.2
Independent	Brian Bailey	460	9.8	N/A
Reform	David Hayward	78	1.7	N/A
UKIP	Brigitte Graham	68	1.5	−4.7
Majority		1,560	33.3	0
Turnout		4,685	38.7	+0.2
Conservative hold				

Feniton and Honiton
Party	Candidate	Votes	%	±%
Conservative	Phil Twiss	2,094	53.3	−7.8
Labour	Jake Bonetta	1,491	37.9	+20.2
Liberal Democrats	Cathy Connor	321	8.2	−3.9
Majority		603	15.3	−28.2
Turnout		3,930	34.1	+7
Conservative hold				

Otter Valley
Party	Candidate	Votes	%	±%
Independent	Jess Bailey	3,224	65.2	N/A
Conservative	Charlie Hobson	1,281	25.9	−3.3
Green	Luke Gray	204	4.1	N/A
Labour	Steve Bloomfield	134	2.7	+0.2
Liberal Democrats	Jake Slee	80	1.6	N/A
Majority		1,943	39.3	−12.7
Turnout		4,948	43.5	−2.6
Independent gain from Independent				

Seaton and Colyton
Party	Candidate	Votes	%	±%
Conservative	Marcus Hartnell	2,321	44.7	+7.6
East Devon Alliance	Martin Shaw	2,176	41.9	+3.9
Labour	George Tomkins	306	5.9	+1.3
Liberal Democrats	Martyn Wilson	160	3.1	−7.8
The Democratic Network	Angela Marynicz	95	1.8	N/A
Freedom Alliance	Paul Blackmore	84	1.6	N/A
Majority		145	2.8	+1.9
Turnout		5,190	42.5	+1.5
Conservative gain from East Devon Alliance				

Sidmouth
Party	Candidate	Votes	%	±%
Conservative	Stuart Hughes	2,601	49.4	+2.1
East Devon Alliance	Louise MacAllister	2,431	46.2	+8.5
Labour Co-op	Colin Mills	209	4.0	−0.6
Majority		170	3.2	−6.4
Turnout		5,265	42.8	+1.8
Conservative hold				

Whimple and Blackdown
Party	Candidate	Votes	%	±%
Conservative	Iain Chubb	2,535	57.4	−8.1
Liberal Democrats	Karen Hoyles	690	15.6	−7.8
Labour Co-op	Liz Pole	624	14.1	+3.8
Green	Wes Healey	523	11.8	N/A
Majority		1,845	41.8	−0.2
Turnout		4,419	39.9	+1.5
Conservative hold				

=== Exeter ===
==== District summary ====
Exeter district summary
Party	Seats	+/-	Votes	%	+/-
Labour	7	Steady	15,465	42.6	–3.4
Conservative	2	Steady	11,617	32.0	–2.8
Green	0	Steady	5,964	16.4	+8.9
Liberal Democrats	0	Steady	2,585	7.1	–1.6
Independent	0	Steady	273	0.8	N/A
For Britain	0	Steady	242	0.7	N/A
Women's Equality	0	Steady	136	0.4	N/A
Total	9	Steady	36,282		

==== Division results ====
Alphington and Cowick
Party	Candidate	Votes	%	±%
Labour Co-op	Yvonne Atkinson	1,955	41.8	−1.5
Conservative	Katherine New	1,700	36.3	+2.3
Green	Julyan Levy	507	10.8	+4.7
Liberal Democrats	Rod Ruffle	483	10.3	−2.2
Majority		255	5.5	−3.7
Turnout		4,677	42.22	+0.82
Labour hold				

Duryard and Pennsylvania
Party	Candidate	Votes	%	±%
Conservative	Percy Prowse	1,370	37.2	−9.6
Labour	Martyn Snow	1,201	32.6	+0.9
Liberal Democrats	Michael Mitchell	549	14.9	+1.2
Green	Rich Parker	425	11.5	+5.8
Women's Equality	Bea Gare	136	3.7	N/A
Majority		169	4.6	−10.5
Turnout		3,699	44.46	−3.04
Conservative hold				

Exwick and St Thomas
Party	Candidate	Votes	%	±%
Labour	Rob Hannaford	1,828	51.3	−6.0
Conservative	Lee Gillett	916	25.7	+4.4
Green	Jamie Lynde	464	13.0	+4.5
For Britain	Frankie Rufolo	197	5.5	N/A
Liberal Democrats	Maya Skelton	160	4.5	−2.1
Majority		912	25.6	−10.4
Turnout		3,565	35.35	−0.75
Labour hold				

Heavitree and Whipton Barton
Party	Candidate	Votes	%	±%
Labour	Danny Barnes	1,937	44.2	+12.3
Conservative	Alfie Carlisle	1,273	29.1	−1.6
Green	Lizzie Woodman	954	21.8	+4.4
Liberal Democrats	Lily James	157	3.6	−14.2
For Britain	Debbie Frayne	45	1.0	−1.2
Majority		664	15.2	−4.7
Turnout		4,378	40.48	−0.52
Labour hold				

Pinhoe and Mincinglake
Party	Candidate	Votes	%	±%
Labour	Tracy Adams	1,935	48.3	+2.1
Conservative	John Harvey	1,333	33.2	−5.2
Green	Paula Fernley	283	7.1	+2.8
Independent	Kate Jago	273	6.8	N/A
Liberal Democrats	Henry Mayall	151	3.8	−1.8
Majority		602	15.0	+7.2
Turnout		4,010	38.72	−0.48
Labour hold				

St David's and Haven Banks
Party	Candidate	Votes	%	±%
Labour	Carol Whitton	1,671	41.2	−2.9
Green	Andrew Bell	1,495	36.8	+19.2
Conservative	Arden Foster-Spink	720	17.7	−8.0
Liberal Democrats	Joel Hambly	172	4.2	−5.5
Majority		176	4.3	
Turnout		4,058	4.3	−14.1
Labour hold				

St Sidwell's and St James
Party	Candidate	Votes	%	±%
Labour	Su Aves	1,967	52.1	−8.6
Green	Johanna Korndorfer	844	22.3	+12.3
Conservative	David Moore	516	13.7	−7.2
Liberal Democrats	Kevin Mitchell	447	11.8	+3.7
Majority		1,123	29.8	−10.0
Turnout		3,774	32.05	−4.55
Labour hold				

Wearside and Topsham
Party	Candidate	Votes	%	±%
Conservative	Andrew Leadbetter	2,332	48.3	−6.5
Labour	Helen Dallimore	1,494	30.9	+1.9
Green	Jon Mills	675	14.0	+8.4
Liberal Democrats	Christine Campion	330	6.8	+0.1
Majority		838	17.3	−4.6
Turnout		4,831		
Conservative hold				

Wonford and St Loye's
Party	Candidate	Votes	%	±%
Labour	Marina Asvachin	1,477	43.6	−3.5
Conservative	Peter Holland	1,457	43.0	+5.6
Green	Jack Eade	317	9.4	+5.1
Liberal Democrats	Kris Mears	136	4.0	−2.8
Majority		20	0.6	−9.1
Turnout		3,387	35.11	+1.41
Labour hold				

=== Mid Devon ===
==== District summary ====
Mid Devon district summary
Party	Seats	+/-	Votes	%	+/-
Conservative	5	Steady	11,985	49.4	+2.9
Liberal Democrats	1	Steady	5,027	20.7	–6.5
Labour	0	Steady	3,395	14.0	+3.2
Green	0	Steady	3,087	12.7	+10.1
Independent	0	Steady	636	2.6	–1.3
Freedom Alliance	0	Steady	154	0.6	N/A
Total	6	Steady	24,284		

==== Division results ====
Crediton
Party	Candidate	Votes	%	±%
Liberal Democrats	Frank Letch	1,811	44.0	−4.8
Conservative	Martin Binks	1,645	39.9	+0.8
Labour	Elin Bold	543	13.2	+6.9
Freedom Alliance	Christopher Hurley	95	2.3	N/A
Majority		166	4.0	
Turnout		4,118	39.4	
Liberal Democrats hold				

Creedy Taw and Mid Exe
Party	Candidate	Votes	%	±%
Conservative	Margaret Squires	2,798	54.4	+1.0
Green	Paul Edwards	946	18.4	+12.1
Liberal Democrats	David Wilson	784	15.2	−9.1
Labour	Thomas Stephenson	477	9.3	+1.1
Freedom Alliance	Ann Conway	103	2.0	N/A
Majority		1,852	36.0	
Turnout		5,147	46.5	
Conservative hold				

Cullompton and Bradninch
Party	Candidate	Votes	%	±%
Conservative	John Berry	1,861	53.0	+8.7
Liberal Democrats	Andrea Glover	765	21.8	−2.2
Green	Hannah Watson	449	12.8	+10.7
Labour	Edward Southerden	411	11.7	+1.9
Majority		1,096	31.2	
Turnout		3,509	33.8	
Conservative hold				

Tiverton East
Party	Candidate	Votes	%	±%
Conservative	Colin Slade	1,598	47.0	+5.5
Liberal Democrats	Matt Farrell	792	23.3	−6.9
Labour	Jason Chamberlain	663	19.5	+1.3
Independent	Andrew Perris	335	9.8	N/A
Majority		806	23.7	
Turnout		3,403	33.9	

Tiverton West
Party	Candidate	Votes	%	±%
Conservative	Richard Chesterton	1,990	45.6	+2.0
Green	Trevor Cope	1,140	26.1	N/A
Labour	Peter Hill	878	20.1	+3.5
	Ana Hendy	301	6.9	N/A
Majority		850	19.5	
Turnout		4,360	38.1	
Conservative hold				

Willand and Uffculme
Party	Candidate	Votes	%	±%
Conservative	Ray Radford	2,093	51.7	−0.8
Liberal Democrats	Simon Clist	875	21.6	−0.3
Green	Adam Rich	552	13.6	+7.5
Labour	Fiona Hutton	423	10.5	+2.4
Freedom Alliance	Charles Kay	59	1.5	N/A
Majority		1,218	30.1	
Turnout		4,045	37.9	
Conservative hold				

=== North Devon ===
==== District summary ====
North Devon district summary
Party	Seats	+/-	Votes	%	+/-
Conservative	5	▼1	11,893	41.7	–2.7
Liberal Democrats	2	▲1	6,460	22.6	–2.8
Independent	1	Steady	3,891	13.6	+3.2
Green	0	Steady	3,719	13.0	+6.0
Labour	0	Steady	2,134	7.5	–1.3
Freedom Alliance	0	Steady	433	1.5	N/A
Total	8	Steady	28,530		

==== Division results ====
Barnstaple North
Party	Candidate	Votes	%	±%
Liberal Democrats	Ian Roome	1,499	44.1	−8.6
Green	Robbie Mack	837	24.6	+17.5
Conservative	Natasha Vukic	742	21.8	−1.6
Labour	Nicholas Agnew	227	6.7	−2.4
Freedom Alliance	Rob Pet	62	1.8	N/A
Majority		662	19.5	
Turnout		3,396	32.4	
Liberal Democrats hold				

Barnstaple South
Party	Candidate	Votes	%	±%
Liberal Democrats	Caroline Leaver	1,436	41.1	+6.9
Conservative	David Hoare	1,217	34.8	−9.8
Independent	David Luggar	328	9.4	N/A
Green	Lou Goodger	250	7.2	+2.2
Labour	Philip Hawkins	202	5.8	−3.9
Freedom Alliance	Josie Knight	41	1.2	N/A
Majority		219	6.3	
Turnout		3,496	34.0	
Liberal Democrats gain from Conservative				

Braunton Rural
Party	Candidate	Votes	%	±%
Conservative	Pru Maskell	1,514	42.4	+1.7
Liberal Democrats	Liz Spear	1,024	28.7	−4.8
Labour	Mark Cann	495	13.9	−4.5
Green	David Relph	454	12.7	N/A
Freedom Alliance	Stewart Johnstone	44	1.2	N/A
Majority		490	13.7	
Turnout		3,568	37.5	
Conservative hold				

Chulmleigh and Landkey
Party	Candidate	Votes	%	±%
Conservative	Paul Henderson	1,523	45.0	−14.0
Independent	Glyn Lane	620	18.3	N/A
Green	Nick Withers	447	13.2	+6.8
Liberal Democrats	Victoria Nel	431	12.7	−15.5
Labour	Valerie Cann	208	6.1	−0.1
Independent	Philip Mason	83	2.4	N/A
Freedom Alliance	Turtle Knight	55	1.6	N/A
Majority		903	26.7	
Turnout		3,388	41.5	
Conservative hold				

Combe Martin Rural
Party	Candidate	Votes	%	±%
Conservative	Andrea Davis	2,476	62.8	−0.3
Liberal Democrats	Julie Hunt	556	14.1	−1.5
Green	Steven White	456	11.6	+3.6
Labour	Oliver Bell	333	8.4	−0.1
Freedom Alliance	Katherine Armitage	79	2.0	N/A
Majority		1,920	48.7	
Turnout		3,945	40.2	
Conservative hold				

Fremington Rural
Party	Candidate	Votes	%	±%
Independent	Frank Biederman	2,627	64.6	+8.8
Conservative	Scott Paddon	789	19.4	−8.7
Liberal Democrats	Helen Walker	310	7.6	−0.7
Labour	Finola O'Neill	151	3.7	+0.6
Green	Stephen Jarvis	146	3.6	+1.7
Freedom Alliance	Paddy Sullivan	30	0.7	N/A
Majority		1,838	45.2	
Turnout		4,068	40.3	
Independent hold				

Ilfracombe
Party	Candidate	Votes	%	±%
Conservative	Paul Crabb	1,493	51.1	+13.0
Green	Netti Pearson	857	29.3	+2.6
Liberal Democrats	Syed Jusef	286	9.8	N/A
Labour	Cecily Blyther	215	7.4	−0.9
Freedom Alliance	Lesley Mason	45	1.5	N/A
Majority		636	21.8	
Turnout		2,924	33.2	
Conservative hold				

South Molton
Party	Candidate	Votes	%	±%
Conservative	Jeremy Yabsley	2,139	54.1	−3.8
Liberal Democrats	Alex White	918	23.2	−6.9
Labour	Steven Hinchliffe	303	7.7	+0.5
Green	Gill Saunders	272	6.9	+2.4
Independent	Steve Cotten	233	5.9	N/A
Freedom Alliance	Val Schenn	77	1.9	N/A
Majority		1,221	30.9	
Turnout		3,955	37.5	
Conservative hold				

=== South Hams ===
==== District summary ====
South Hams district summary
Party	Seats	+/-	Votes	%	+/-
Conservative	4	▼1	14,287	46.7	+0.6
Liberal Democrats	2	▲1	7,332	24.0	–1.5
Green	1	Steady	4,180	13.7	+2.8
Labour	0	Steady	3,942	12.9	+0.5
Freedom Alliance	0	Steady	648	2.1	N/A
Reform UK	0	Steady	92	0.3	N/A
TUSC	0	Steady	82	0.3	N/A
Total	7	Steady	30,563		

==== Division results ====
Bickleigh and Wembury
Party	Candidate	Votes	%	±%
Conservative	John Hart	2,470	63.9	−7.5
Labour	Edward Parsons	534	13.8	+2.5
Green	Win Scutt	416	10.8	+3.4
Liberal Democrats	Christopher Oram	353	9.1	−0.4
Freedom Alliance	Emma Relph	59	1.5	N/A
Majority		1,936		
Turnout			38.6	
Conservative hold				

Dartmouth and Marldon
Party	Candidate	Votes	%	±%
Conservative	Jonathan Hawkins	2,380	60.9	−5.4
Liberal Democrats	Simon Rake	707	18.1	+4.9
Labour	Kevin John	549	14.1	+4.2
Reform	Carlo Bragagnolo	92	2.4	N/A
TUSC	Lynn Gunnigle	82	2.1	N/A
Freedom Alliance	Christian Parkes	59	1.5	N/A
Majority		1,673		
Turnout			40.3	
Conservative hold				

Ivybridge
Party	Candidate	Votes	%	±%
Conservative	Roger Croad	1,982	55.8	+0.1
Liberal Democrats	Victor Abbott	855	24.1	+18.1
Labour	David Trigger	621	17.5	−9.6
Freedom Alliance	Simon Gedye	65	1.8	N/A
Majority		1,127		
Turnout			37.8	
Conservative hold				

Kingsbridge
Party	Candidate	Votes	%	±%
Liberal Democrats	Julian Brazil	2,683	52.5	+1.3
Conservative	Samantha Dennis	1,793	35.1	−6.6
Green	Bettina Rixon	276	5.4	N/A
Labour	Paul Furlong	237	4.6	−2.3
Freedom Alliance	Peter Burgess	89	1.7	N/A
Majority		890		
Turnout			48.0	
Liberal Democrats hold				

Salcombe
Party	Candidate	Votes	%	±%
Conservative	Rufus Gilbert	2,500	59.9	−1.6
Liberal Democrats	Mark Lawrence	622	14.9	−9.7
Labour	Jonno Barrett	479	11.5	+4.0
Green	Lily Rixon	462	11.1	+4.7
Freedom Alliance	Jim Blake	68	1.6	N/A
Majority		1,878		
Turnout			44.5	
Conservative hold				

South Brent and Yealmpton
Party	Candidate	Votes	%	±%
Liberal Democrats	Daniel Thomas	2,112	41.2	+10.6
Conservative	Richard Hosking	2,074	40.5	−11.4
Labour	Paul Bishop	784	15.3	+7.4
Freedom Alliance	James Sandy	119	2.3	N/A
Majority		38		
Turnout			48.7	
Liberal Democrats gain from Conservative				

Totnes and Dartington
Party	Candidate	Votes	%	±%
Green	Jacqi Hodgson	3,026	59.6	+24.7
Conservative	Jamie Rogers	1,088	21.4	+1.0
Labour	Jill Hannam	738	14.5	+2.0
Freedom Alliance	Stephen Hopwood	189	3.7	N/A
Majority		1,938		
Turnout			48.0	
Green hold				

=== Teignbridge ===
==== District summary ====
Teignbridge district summary
Party	Seats	+/-	Votes	%	+/-
Conservative	5	▼1	15,647	38.4	–4.5
Liberal Democrats	4	Steady	14,881	36.5	–3.2
Independent	1	▲1	3,380	8.3	+4.3
Labour	0	Steady	3,897	9.6	+2.1
Green	0	Steady	2,247	5.5	+2.5
TUSC	0	Steady	589	1.4	N/A
Reform UK	0	Steady	75	0.2	N/A
Total	10	Steady	40,716		

==== Division results ====
Ashburton and Buckfastleigh
Party	Candidate	Votes	%	±%
Conservative	Sarah Parker-Khan	1,741	40.8	+4.4
Liberal Democrats	John Nutley	1,444	33.9	−2.0
Green	Andy Williamson	549	12.9	N/A
Labour	Su Maddock	501	11.7	+3.3
Majority		297		
Turnout			42.8	
Conservative hold				

Bovey Rural
Party	Candidate	Votes	%	±%
Conservative	George Gribble	2,004	46.8	−3.1
Liberal Democrats	Sally Morgan	881	20.6	−11.1
Labour	Lisa Robillard Webb	522	12.2	+5.1
Independent	Eoghan Kelly	460	10.7	+6.2
Green	Anna Presland	378	8.8	+4.9
Majority		1,123		
Turnout			41.6	
Conservative hold				

Chudleigh and Teign Valley
Party	Candidate	Votes	%	±%
Conservative	Jerry Brook	1,704	38.9	−10.7
Liberal Democrats	Richard Keeling	1,479	33.8	−3.9
Green	Emily Simcock	674	15.4	+9.9
Labour	Rick Webb	485	11.1	+4.1
Majority		225		
Turnout			42.6	
Conservative hold				

Dawlish
Party	Candidate	Votes	%	±%
Liberal Democrats	Martin Wrigley	1,920	39.6	+7.7
Conservative	Noel Nickless	1,818	37.5	−14.3
Independent	Linda Petherick	571	11.8	N/A
Labour	Jeff Pocock	375	7.7	−2.1
Reform	Richard Ward	75	1.5	N/A
TUSC	Bruce Mattock	69	1.4	N/A
Majority		102		
Turnout			38.5	
Liberal Democrats gain from Conservative				

Exminster and Haldon
Party	Candidate	Votes	%	±%
Liberal Democrats	Alan Connett	2,521	65.0	+13.5
Conservative	Terry Tume	806	20.8	−15.7
Green	Lucy Rockliffe	312	8.0	+2.9
Labour	Bhav Studley	222	5.7	+0.9
Majority		1,715		
Turnout			42.5	
Liberal Democrats hold				

Ipplepen and The Kerswells
Party	Candidate	Votes	%	±%
Liberal Democrats	Alistair Dewhirst	1,822	38.6	−7.4
Conservative	Chris Clarance	1,590	33.7	−10.5
Independent	Jane Taylor	928	19.7	N/A
Green	Graham Read	183	3.9	+0.4
Labour	John Hodgson	171	3.6	+0.4
Majority		232		
Turnout			44.9	
Liberal Democrats hold				

Kingsteignton and Teign Estuary
Party	Candidate	Votes	%	±%
Conservative	Ron Peart	2,182	58.9	+6.6
Liberal Democrats	Andrew MacGregor	812	21.9	−2.7
Labour	Christopher Robillard	533	14.4	+5.7
TUSC	James Osben	153	4.1	−4.6
Majority		1,370		
Turnout			30.8	
Conservative hold				

Newton Abbot North
Party	Candidate	Votes	%	±%
Conservative	Phil Bullivant	1,280	38.4	+4.5
Independent	Liam Mullone	835	25.1	N/A
Liberal Democrats	Eloise Rokirilov	795	23.9	−14.5
Labour	Lesley Robson	298	8.9	+0.5
TUSC	Ryan Hall	98	2.9	N/A
Majority		445		
Turnout			30.0	
Conservative gain from Liberal Democrats				

Newton Abbot South
Party	Candidate	Votes	%	±%
Independent	Janet Bradford	1,157	33.1	N/A
Liberal Democrats	Colin Parker	967	27.7	−33.8
Conservative	Alex Hall	928	26.5	−1.1
Labour	John Fitzsimmons	190	5.4	−2.6
Green	Doug Pratt	151	4.3	+1.6
TUSC	Jane Haden	64	1.8	N/A
Majority		190		
Turnout			35.5	
Independent gain from Liberal Democrats				

Teignmouth
Party	Candidate	Votes	%	±%
Liberal Democrats	David Cox	2,240	47.9	+8.4
Conservative	Sylvia Russell	1,594	34.1	−5.9
Labour	Jackie Jackson	600	12.8	+2.7
TUSC	Sean Brogan	205	4.4	N/A
Majority		646		
Turnout			39.6	
Liberal Democrats gain from Conservative				

=== Torridge ===
==== District summary ====
Torridge district summary
Party	Seats	+/-	Votes	%	+/-
Conservative	5	Steady	9,484	47.5	–0.9
Independent	0	Steady	3,463	17.4	+12.3
Liberal Democrats	0	Steady	2,734	13.7	±0.0
Labour	0	Steady	2,370	11.9	–2.1
Green	0	Steady	1,857	9.3	+5.2
Freedom Alliance	0	Steady	50	0.3	N/A
Total	5	Steady	19,958		

==== Division results ====
Bideford East
Party	Candidate	Votes	%	±%
Conservative	Linda Hellyer	1,450	44.4	+14.5
Labour	Annie Brenton	585	17.9	−2.0
Green	Will Douglas-Mann	368	11.3	+5.3
Independent	James Craigie	304	9.3	N/A
Independent	Jude Gubb	298	9.1	N/A
Liberal Democrats	Stephen Potts	226	6.9	−3.0
Majority		865	26.5	
Turnout		3,267	32.2	
Conservative hold				

Bideford West and Hartland
Party	Candidate	Votes	%	±%
Conservative	Jeffrey Wilton-Love	1,003	34.3	−8.1
Independent	Tony Inch	465	15.9	−26.5
Labour	Dylan Billson	405	13.9	−3.7
Green	Keith Funnell	280	9.6	N/A
Independent	Joel Herron	265	9.1	N/A
Independent	Robin Julian	224	7.7	−12.7
Liberal Democrats	Bert Bruins	216	7.4	−11.9
Freedom Alliance	Paul Jelf	50	1.7	N/A
Majority		538	18.5	
Turnout		2,921	32.5	
Conservative hold				

Holsworthy Rural
Party	Candidate	Votes	%	±%
Conservative	James Morrish	2,927	58.7	−8.5
Independent	Pete Watson	873	17.5	N/A
Green	Cathrine Simmons	425	8.5	N/A
Labour	Jim Lowe	398	8.0	−1.3
Liberal Democrats	Claire Davey-Potts	328	6.6	−5.5
Majority		2,054	41.2	
Turnout		4,988	39.7	
Conservative hold				

Northam
Party	Candidate	Votes	%	±%
Conservative	Dermot McGeough	1,586	36.5	−17.1
Independent	Leonard Ford	1,034	23.8	N/A
Liberal Democrats	David Chalmers	971	22.4	+13.7
Labour	Jake McLean	390	9.0	−2.5
Green	Simon Mathers	330	7.6	−0.8
Majority		552	12.7	
Turnout		4,343	42.8	
Conservative hold				

Torrington Rural
Party	Candidate	Votes	%	±%
Conservative	Andrew Saywell	2,518	54.9	+14.5
Liberal Democrats	Chris Bright	993	21.7	+3.1
Labour	Siobhan Strode	592	12.9	−1.8
Green	Ruth Funnell	454	9.9	+4.3
Majority		1,525	33.2	
Turnout		4,585	40.1	
Conservative hold				

=== West Devon ===
==== District summary ====
West Devon district summary
Party	Seats	+/-	Votes	%	+/-
Conservative	4	Steady	8,407	47.3	–4.1
Independent	0	Steady	3,156	17.8	+1.3
Green	0	Steady	2,795	15.7	+7.2
Labour	0	Steady	1,794	10.1	+1.2
Liberal Democrats	0	Steady	1,429	8.0	–1.8
Reform UK	0	Steady	179	1.0	N/A
Total	4	Steady	17,760		

==== Division results ====
Hatherleigh and Chagford
Party	Candidate	Votes	%	±%
Conservative	James McInnes	2,355	53.4	−9.2
Green	Lynn Daniel	1,142	25.9	+15.3
Liberal Democrats	George Dexter	458	10.4	−2.6
Labour	Douglas Smith	330	7.5	−1.7
Reform	Matt Morton	89	2.0	N/A
Majority		1,213		
Turnout			41.9	
Conservative hold				

Okehampton Rural
Party	Candidate	Votes	%	±%
Conservative	Lois Samuel	1,942	45.8	−3.4
Independent	Tony Leech	948	22.4	+5.2
Green	Brian Wood	552	13.0	+6.9
Labour	Terry Edwards	424	10.0	−3.2
Liberal Democrats	Patrick Gilbert	235	5.5	−3.9
Reform	Bob Rush	90	2.1	N/A
Majority		994		
Turnout			36.4	
Conservative hold				

Tavistock
Party	Candidate	Votes	%	±%
Conservative	Debo Sellis	1,847	43.6	−5.6
Independent	Mandy Ewings	1,085	25.6	N/A
Liberal Democrats	Pete Squire	464	11.4	+3.8
Labour	Mike Sparling	442	10.0	+3.6
Green	Chris Jordan	364	8.6	+2.7
Majority		762		
Turnout			41.8	
Conservative hold				

Yelverton Rural
Party	Candidate	Votes	%	±%
Conservative	Philip Sanders	2,263	45.0	0.0
Independent	Mark Renders	1,123	22.3	N/A
Green	Judy Maciejowska	737	14.7	+4.0
Labour	Tony Marchese	598	11.9	+5.0
Liberal Democrats	Ashley-Ross West	272	5.4	−3.8
Majority		1,140		
Turnout			43.7	
Conservative hold				

== Changes 2021–2025 ==
- Paul Henderson, elected as a Conservative, left the party in March 2023 to sit as an independent.
- Rob Hannaford, elected for Labour, left the party in January 2024 to sit as an independent.
