= 2015 East Devon District Council election =

2015 UK local government election

Results of the 2015 East Devon District Council election

The 2015 East Devon District Council election took place on 7 May 2015 to elect members of East Devon District Council in England. This was on the same day as other local elections.

== Ward results ==
Axminster Rural, 2015
Party	Candidate	Votes	%	±%
Conservative	Ian L. Hall	1,065		
Labour	Jerry Walden	403		
Turnout		1,468	72.1	−
Conservative hold				

Axminster Town, 2015
Party	Candidate	Votes	%	±%
Conservative	Andrew T Moulding	1,105		
Liberal Democrats	Douglas R. Hull	910		
East Devon Alliance	Paul G. Hayward	819		
Conservative	Stephanie C. Jones	580		
UKIP	Lindy Bailhache	450		
Liberal Democrats	Martin D. Spurway	352		
Independent	Chris Tipping	298		
Turnout		2,480	70.5	
Conservative hold				
Liberal Democrats hold				

Broadclyst, 2015
Party	Candidate	Votes	%	±%
Conservative	Christopher Pepper	1,799		
Conservative	Maria Hale	1,657		
Independent	Paul Newman	1,519		
Liberal Democrats	Stephen W. Schlich	1,504		
Turnout		3,758	72.6	
Conservative hold				
Conservative gain from Liberal Democrats				

Budleigh Salterton 2015
Party	Candidate	Votes	%	±%
Conservative	Steve Hall	1,841		
Conservative	Alan Dent	1,817		
Conservative	Tom Wright	1,681		
East Devon Alliance	Les Cotton	1,525		
Green	Nick Barton	1,244		
Turnout		3,754	77.1	−
Conservative hold				
Conservative hold				
Conservative hold				

Coly Valley, 2015
Party	Candidate	Votes	%	±%
Conservative	Helen E. Parr	1,478		
Conservative	Graham S. Godbeer	1,478		
East Devon Alliance	Sheila M. Smith	1,159		
East Devon Alliance	Paul Arnott	1,133		
Turnout		2,765	74.6	
Conservative hold				
Conservative hold				

Dunkeswell, 2015
Party	Candidate	Votes	%	±%
Conservative	Colin Brown	595		
Independent	Bob Buxton	450		
Turnout		1,045	65.6	
Conservative hold				

Exe Valley, 2015
Party	Candidate	Votes	%	±%
Conservative	Simon P. Grundy	624		
East Devon Alliance	Erin B. Whitcroft	573		
Turnout		1,197	77.1	
Conservative hold				

Exmouth Brixington, 2015
Party	Candidate	Votes	%	±%
Conservative	Maddy Chapman	1,644		
Conservative	David Chapman	1,599		
Conservative	Cherry Nicholas	1,511		
East Devon Alliance	Mark O. Daughtrey	1,281		
Liberal Democrats	Andrew J. Toye	855		
Labour	Stuart N. Fegan	733		
Turnout		3,447	70.0	
Conservative hold				
Conservative hold				
Conservative gain from Independent				

Exmouth Halsdon, 2015
Party	Candidate	Votes	%	±%
Conservative	Jill M. Elson	1,644		
East Devon Alliance	Megan Armstrong	1,631		
Conservative	Pauline A. Scott	1,539		
Liberal Democrats	Tim Dumper	1,419		
Conservative	Emma V. Gibbons	1,418		
Labour	Hattie Ajderian	983		
Turnout		3,730	72.3	
Conservative hold				
East Devon Alliance gain from Conservative				
Conservative hold				

Exmouth Littleham, 2015
Party	Candidate	Votes	%	±%
Conservative	Alison Greenhalgh	1,667		
Conservative	John T. Humphreys	1,636		
Conservative	Mark Williamson	1,489		
East Devon Alliance	Robert Crick	1,224		
Liberal Democrats	Daphne A. Fensom	1,170		
UKIP	Tim Davey	1,164		
Green	Mike Rosser	1,102		
Turnout		3,912	67.9	
Conservative hold				
Conservative hold				
Conservative hold				

Exmouth Town, 2015
Party	Candidate	Votes	%	±%
Liberal Democrats	Eileen Elizabeth Wragg	1,069		
Liberal Democrats	Pat Graham	970		
Conservative	Bill Nash	865		
Conservative	Paul M. Dean	856		
Green	Robert N. Masding	804		
Liberal Democrats	Roger Bourgein	737		
Labour	Ray Davison	714		
Conservative	Jeff Trail	711		
Turnout		2,860	62.6	
Liberal Democrats hold				
Liberal Democrats hold				
Conservative gain from Liberal Democrats				

Exmouth Withycombe Raleigh, 2015
Party	Candidate	Votes	%	±%
Liberal Democrats	Brenda O. Taylor	1,317		
Liberal Democrats	Steve Gazzard	1,239		
Conservative	Brian A. Bailey	1,181		
Conservative	Richard Scott	1,028		
Liberal Democrats	Brian J. Toye	1,004		
Conservative	Brian J. Youle	940		
Green	Ben Jones	804		
Turnout		3,282	64.4	
Liberal Democrats hold				
Liberal Democrats hold				
Conservative gain from Liberal Democrats				

Feniton & Buckerell, 2015
Party	Candidate	Votes	%	±%
Independent	Susie Bond	1,048		
Conservative	John Z. Zarczynski	288		
Turnout		1,336	74.7	
Independent gain from Conservative				

Honiton St. Michael`s, 2015
Party	Candidate	Votes	%	±%
Conservative	David Foster	1,400		
Conservative	Mike Allen	1,390		
Conservative	Phil Twiss	1,304		
UKIP	Ashley Alder	734		
East Devon Alliance	Jackie Wadsworth	723		
Independent	John B. Taylor	690		
UKIP	Brian Smith	636		
UKIP	Bernard Walker	599		
Turnout		3,247	64.4	
Conservative hold				
Conservative hold				
Conservative hold				

Honiton St. Paul`s, 2015
Party	Candidate	Votes	%	±%
Conservative	John O'Leary	915		
Conservative	Dean Barrow	910		
Labour	Henry F. Brown	641		
UKIP	Roy E. Coombes	598		
Independent	Roger W. Boote	558		
UKIP	Leslie Smith	475		
Turnout		2,509	69.0	
Conservative hold				
Conservative hold				

Newbridges, 2015
Party	Candidate	Votes	%	±%
Conservative	Iain Chubb	1,014		
Liberal Democrats	Bill Foster	661		
Turnout		1,675	85.6	
Conservative hold				

Newton Poppleford and Harpford, 2015
Party	Candidate	Votes	%	±%
East Devon Alliance	Val Ranger	764		
Conservative	Pasty Hayman	486		
Turnout		1,250	73.3	
East Devon Alliance gain from				

Otterhead, 2015
Party	Candidate	Votes	%	±%
Conservative	David RA Key	817		
Independent	Graham G. Long	554		
Turnout		1,371	77.6	
Conservative hold				

Ottery St. Mary Rural, 2015
Party	Candidate	Votes	%	±%
East Devon Alliance	Matt Coppell	1,507		
Conservative	Paul R. Carter	1,255		
East Devon Alliance	Crawford IP Winlove	1,226		
Conservative	Alasdair S. Bruce	896		
Turnout		2,731	81.6	
East Devon Alliance gain from Independent				
Conservative hold				

Ottery St. Mary Town, 2015
Party	Candidate	Votes	%	±%
Independent	Roger Giles	2,087		
Independent	Peter H. Faithfull	987		
Conservative	Tim Venner	763		
Conservative	Nick Partridge	561		
Labour	Andrew V. Blackwell	513		
Turnout		2,810	73.4	
Independent hold				
Independent gain from Conservative				

Raleigh, 2015
Party	Candidate	Votes	%	±%
East Devon Alliance	Geoff Jung	950		
Conservative	Ray Bloxham	525		
Turnout		1,475	89.0	
East Devon Alliance hold				

Seaton, 2015
Party	Candidate	Votes	%	±%
Conservative	Marcus Hartnell	1,856		
Conservative	Jim Knight	1,399		
Liberal Democrats	Peter W. Burrows	1,329		
Conservative	Jenni Brown	1,124		
East Devon Alliance	Martin Shaw	1,068		
UKIP	Stephen Lee	828		
UKIP	John Walker	817		
Liberal Democrats	Mark A. Fisher	680		
Liberal Democrats	Jonathan WR Underwood	649		
Independent	Jeffrey K. Packman	493		
Turnout		4,122	70.0	
Conservative hold				
Conservative hold				
Liberal Democrats hold				

Sidmouth Rural, 2015
Party	Candidate	Votes	%	±%
Independent	David S. Barratt	813		
Conservative	Christine E. Drew	609		
Turnout		1,428	77.2	
Independent gain from Conservative				

Sidmouth Sidford, 2015
Party	Candidate	Votes	%	±%
Conservative	Stuart Hughes	1,779		
East Devon Alliance	Dawn Manley	1,479		
East Devon Alliance	Marianne P. Rixon	1,327		
Conservative	Ian J. McKenzie-Edwards	1,145		
East Devon Alliance	Debbie Tallis	1,115		
Conservative	Graham M. Troman	1,022		
Independent	Jack Brokenshire	898		
Liberal Democrats	Lewis S. Ragbourn	526		
Turnout		3,895	72.8	
Conservative hold				
East Devon Alliance hold				
East Devon Alliance hold				

Sidmouth Town, 2015
Party	Candidate	Votes	%	±%
East Devon Alliance	Matthew Booth	1,832		
East Devon Alliance	Cathy Gardner	1,704		
Independent	John GT Dyson	1,495		
Conservative	Sheila R. Kerridge	1,114		
Conservative	Francis I. Newth	1,068		
Conservative	Peter Sullivan	904		
Turnout		3,353	75.1	
East Devon Alliance gain from Conservative				
East Devon Alliance gain from Conservative				
Independent gain from Conservative				

Tale Vale, 2015
Party	Candidate	Votes	%	±%
Conservative	Philip Skinner	992		
Independent	Andrew EJ Dinnis	486		
Turnout		1,478	77.2	
Conservative hold				

Whimple, 2015
Party	Candidate	Votes	%	±%
Conservative	Peter N. Bowden	792		
Liberal Democrats	Martin Gammell	673		
Turnout		1,465	79.9	
Conservative gain from Liberal Democrats				

Woodbury & Lympstone, 2015
Party	Candidate	Votes	%	±%
East Devon Alliance	Ben Ingham	1,841		
East Devon Alliance	Rob Longhurst	1,526		
Conservative	David G. Atkins	1,013		
Turnout		2,599	75.8	
East Devon Alliance gain from Independent				
East Devon Alliance gain from Conservative				

Yarty, 2015
Party	Candidate	Votes	%	±%
Conservative	Paul A. Diviani	776		
East Devon Alliance	Steve Horner	473		
Green	Colin Boyd	168		
Liberal Democrats	Robert Jordan	154		
Turnout		1,571	81.5	
Conservative hold				
