= East Devon Alliance =

- Leader: Paul Arnott
- Chairperson: Cathy Gardner
- Founded: 2015
- Dissolved: 2023
- Merged into: Liberal Democrats (UK)
- Political position: Localism
- Slogan: Independents working for you

Website
- http://www.eastdevonalliance.com

The East Devon Alliance, also known as the Independent East Devon Alliance, was registered as a political party in East Devon at the Electoral Commission in 2015.

The party won 10 of the 59 seats in the 2015 East Devon District Council election. In 2017, EDA elected its first Devon County Councillor, former Labour Party member Martin Shaw, representing Seaton and Colyton. Martin Shaw is no longer a Devon County Councillor for Seaton and Colyton following the 2021 election when Marcus Hartnell (Conservative) was elected.

The party did not contest the 2023 East Devon District Council election, after which it therefore had no councillors. Of the 12 councillors it had prior to the election, four stood as Liberal Democrats, five stood as independent candidates and three did not stand for re-election. The East Devon Alliance leader Paul Arnott, who was also leader of East Devon District Council, was one of those who stood as a Liberal Democrat, having already joined that party at a national level in 2022 ahead of the Tiverton and Honiton by-election.

== See also ==
- South Devon Alliance
