= 2023 East Devon District Council election =

2023 English local election

- 4 May 2023

All 60 seats to East Devon District Council 31 seats needed for a majority

	First party	Second party	Third party
Leader			Philip Skinner (defeated)
Party	Independent	Liberal Democrats	Conservative
Last election	19 seats, 23.6%	8 seats, 15.3%	20 seats, 36.2%
Seats before	16	7	21
Seats after	19	18	17
Seat change	Steady	▲10	▼3
Popular vote	20,854	23,378	27,980
Percentage	25.6%	28.7%	34.4%
Swing	▲2.1%	▲13.5%	▼1.8%
	Fourth party	Fifth party	Sixth party
Party	Labour	Green	Liberal
Last election	0 seats, 6.3%	2 seats, 3.4%	0 seats, 0.0%
Seats before	2 (Note: Including one vacant seat previously held by Paul Millar, who was elected as an independent in 2019, joined Labour in July 2021, and resigned in early 2023 ahead of the election.)	2	0
Seats after	3	2	1
Seat change	▲3	Steady	▲1
Popular vote	4,698	3,898	534
Percentage	5.8%	4.8%	0.7%
Swing	▼0.6%	▲1.4%	N/A
	Seventh party
Leader	Paul Arnott
Party	East Devon Alliance
Last election	11 seats, 14.0%
Seats before	12
Seats after	0
Seat change	▼11
Popular vote	0
Percentage	0.0%
Swing	▼14.0%
- Winner of each seat at the 2023 East Devon District Council election
Leader before election
Paul Arnott
East Devon Alliance
No overall control
Leader after election
Paul Arnott
Liberal Democrat
No overall control

The 2023 East Devon District Council election took place on 4 May 2023 to elect all 60 members of East Devon District Council in Devon, England. This was on the same day as other local elections across England.

The council remained under no overall control, being led by an alliance of the Liberal Democrats, Greens, Labour and some of the independent councillors.

== Overview ==
Prior to the election the council was under no overall control, being led by the "Democratic Alliance Group" of 23 councillors, comprising the East Devon Alliance, Liberal Democrats, Greens, and two of the independent councillors. The group was led by Paul Arnott of the East Devon Alliance. They were supported by some of the other independent groups and Labour. The 16 independent councillors who did not represent a registered political party were divided into five different groupings:

- The Independents (5)
- Independent Progressive Group (4)
- Cranbrook Voice (3)
- Part of Democratic Alliance Group (2)
- Not aligned to a group (2)

There was also one vacant seat on the council.

The local party of the East Devon Alliance did not contest the 2023 election. Of the 12 councillors it had prior to the election, four stood as Liberal Democrats, five stood as independent candidates and three did not stand for re-election. The East Devon Alliance leader Paul Arnott, who was also leader of the council, was one of those who stood as a Liberal Democrat, having already joined the party at a national level in 2022.

The election saw the council remain under no overall control. The Conservative group leader, Philip Skinner, lost his seat. A Democratic Alliance Group formed again after the election, this time comprising the Liberal Democrats, Greens and nine of the independent councillors. Of the other independent councillors, nine formed the "Independent Group" and one sat with the single Liberal councillor as the "Independent Councillor Group". Paul Arnott was re-appointed leader of the council after the election, this time as a Liberal Democrat.

== Results summary ==
Following the results, the council remained under no overall control.

2023 East Devon District Council election
Party	Candidates	Seats	Gains	Losses	Net gain/loss	Seats %	Votes %	Votes	+/−
Independent	27	19	9	11	▼2	31.7	25.7	20,854	+2.1
Liberal Democrats	34	18	12	2	▲10	30.0	28.8	23,378	+13.5
Conservative	53	17	6	9	▼3	28.3	34.4	27,980	-1.8
Labour	8	3	3	0	▲3	5.0	5.7	4,698	-0.6
Green	8	2	1	1	Steady	3.3	4.8	3,898	+1.4
Liberal	1	1	1	0	▲1	1.7	0.7	534	+0.7
Heritage	1	0	0	0	Steady	0.0	0.1	57	+0.1
East Devon Alliance	0	0	0	11	▼11	0.0	0.0	0	-14.0
UKIP	0	0	0	0	Steady	0.0	0.0	0	–1.1

== Ward results ==
The ward results were as follow, with an asterisk (*) indicating a sitting councillor standing for re-election.

=== Axminster ===
Axminster
Party	Candidate	Votes	%	±%
Independent	Paul Hayward	1,219	55.4	N/A
Independent	Sarah Jackson*	1,065	48.4	+2.3
Independent	Simon Smith	893	40.6	N/A
Conservative	Ian Hall*	801	36.4	−1.3
Conservative	Steve Holt	544	24.7	−4.8
Liberal Democrats	Gillian Jordan	531	24.1	−1.7
Conservative	David Willey	420	19.1	−15.0
Labour	Jeremy Walden	395	17.9	−0.7
Majority				
Turnout		2,202	34.7	
Independent gain from East Devon Alliance		Swing		
Independent gain from Conservative		Swing		
Independent gain from Conservative		Swing		

=== Beer & Branscombe ===
Beer & Branscombe
Party	Candidate	Votes	%	±%
Independent	John Heath	431	56.9	N/A
Conservative	Maria Hall	170	22.5	N/A
Liberal Democrats	Peter Burrows	156	20.6	N/A
Majority				
Turnout		757	36.0	
Independent gain from Independent		Swing		

=== Broadclyst ===
Broadclyst
Party	Candidate	Votes	%	±%
Liberal Democrats	Sarah Chamberlain*	711	42.4	−8.8
Green	Paula Fearnley	700	41.8	+6.2
Liberal Democrats	Eleanor Rylance*	689	41.1	−5.3
Liberal Democrats	Katie Jones	661	39.4	+6.2
Independent	Jane Chanot	482	28.8	N/A
Conservative	Colin Trudgeon	474	28.3	−14.0
Conservative	Keith Bickers	430	25.7	−3.2
Majority				
Turnout		1,676	27.7	
Liberal Democrats hold		Swing		
Green gain from Conservative		Swing		
Liberal Democrats hold		Swing		

=== Budleigh & Raleigh ===
Budleigh & Raleigh
Party	Candidate	Votes	%	±%
Independent	Charlotte Fitzgerald	1,174	40.9	N/A
Conservative	Henry Riddell	1,086	37.8	−3.6
Independent	Melanie Martin	1,076	37.5	N/A
Conservative	Patsy Hayman	1,046	36.4	−0.1
Liberal Democrats	Catriona Cunningham	882	30.7	N/A
Liberal Democrats	Jed Falby	878	30.6	N/A
Liberal Democrats	Penny Lewis	865	30.1	−3.7
Conservative	David Walsh	848	29.5	−7.7
Majority				
Turnout		2,872	44.3	
Independent gain from Independent		Swing		
Conservative hold		Swing		
Independent gain from Conservative		Swing		

=== Clyst Valley ===
Clyst Valley
Party	Candidate	Votes	%	±%
Independent	Mike Howe*	361	53.3	+53.3
Conservative	Will French	182	26.9	+26.9
Liberal Democrats	Adrian Lock	134	19.8	N/A
Majority				
Turnout		677	35.9	
Independent gain from Conservative		Swing		

=== Coly Valley ===
Coly Valley
Party	Candidate	Votes	%	±%
Liberal Democrats	Paul Arnott*	959	58.1	+2.5
Conservative	Helen Parr*	845	51.2	+0.8
Conservative	John Tristram	567	34.3	−2.7
Majority				
Turnout		1,652	42.5	
Liberal Democrats gain from East Devon Alliance		Swing		
Conservative hold		Swing		

=== Cranbrook ===
Cranbrook
Party	Candidate	Votes	%	±%
Independent	Kim Bloxham*	614	60.4	−2.0
Independent	Kevin Blakey*	521	51.3	−1.4
Independent	Sam Hawkins*	458	45.1	−3.2
Independent	Vincent Wilton	424	41.7	N/A
Liberal Democrats	Rebecca Lipscombe	246	24.2	+5.3
Conservative	Barry Rogers	137	13.5	−14.6
Conservative	Alexandra Croft	123	12.1	−15.2
Heritage	Lisa Goudie	57	5.6	N/A
Majority				
Turnout		1,016	21.0	
Independent hold		Swing		
Independent hold		Swing		
Independent hold		Swing		

=== Dunkeswell & Otterhead ===
Dunkeswell & Otterhead
Party	Candidate	Votes	%	±%
Liberal Democrats	Yehudi Levine	758	46.4	+10.8
Conservative	Colin Brown*	741	45.4	−8.8
Independent	Gary Burford	370	22.7	N/A
Labour	Ollie Tucker	322	19.7	−0.9
Conservative	Ian Morgan	109	6.7	−49.2
Majority				
Turnout		1,633	36.5	
Liberal Democrats gain from Conservative		Swing		
Conservative hold		Swing		

The number of votes for Ian Morgan was in fact 682 (41.8%). However, his result was declared in error as 109 votes by the returning officer. Under UK election law this result stands, as it can only be changed through a petition to a court. This is unlikely to take place given the elected candidates were not affected by this error.

=== Exe Valley ===
Exe Valley
Party	Candidate	Votes	%	±%
Liberal Democrats	Jamie Kemp*	475	70.5	+13.8
Conservative	Kevin Wraight	199	29.5	−13.8
Majority				
Turnout		674	35.5	
Liberal Democrats hold		Swing		

=== Exmouth Brixington ===
Exmouth Brixington
Party	Candidate	Votes	%	±%
Conservative	Maddy Chapman*	734	42.2	−4.8
Conservative	Fred Caygill*	673	38.7	−6.2
Conservative	Cherry Nicholas	662	38.0	−6.8
Liberal Democrats	Andrew Colman*	579	33.3	−12.9
Labour	Jamie Wickenden	559	32.1	+5.1
Independent	Aurora Bailey	518	29.8	−14.7
Independent	Ian Kirvan	471	27.1	N/A
Green	Malcolm Marrett	434	24.9	N/A
Majority				
Turnout		1,740	28.4	
Conservative hold		Swing		
Conservative gain from Liberal Democrats		Swing		
Conservative hold		Swing		

=== Exmouth Halsdon ===
Exmouth Halsdon
Party	Candidate	Votes	%	±%
Liberal Democrats	Tim Dumper	1,099	56.2	+42.3
Liberal Democrats	Andrew Toye	964	49.3	+33.8
Labour	Daniel Wilson	839	42.9	N/A
Conservative	Pauline Stott	820	41.9	+21.6
Conservative	Richard Parr	638	32.6	+7.2
Majority				
Turnout		1,957	33.2	
Liberal Democrats gain from Independent		Swing		
Liberal Democrats gain from Independent		Swing		
Labour gain from Green		Swing		

=== Exmouth Littleham ===
Exmouth Littleham
Party	Candidate	Votes	%	±%
Liberal Democrats	Anne Hall	1,144	49.4	+27.0
Liberal Democrats	Nick Hookway*	1,075	46.5	−0.3
Conservative	Brian Bailey	986	42.6	+20.6
Conservative	Oliver Kerr	952	41.1	+12.6
Liberal Democrats	David Poor	834	36.0	+15.6
Green	Mike Rosser	784	33.9	N/A
Majority				
Turnout		2,314	34.5	
Liberal Democrats gain from Independent		Swing		
Liberal Democrats gain from Independent		Swing		
Conservative hold		Swing		

=== Exmouth Town ===
Exmouth Town
Party	Candidate	Votes	%	±%
Independent	Joe Whibley*	1,043	66.3	+20.0
Green	Olly Davey*	988	62.8	+19.4
Liberal Democrats	Eileen Wragg*	974	61.9	+25.2
Conservative	Dominic Nancekievill	338	21.5	+5.1
Conservative	Sylvia Wills	331	21.0	+5.5
Majority				
Turnout		1,573	27.8	
Independent hold		Swing		
Green hold		Swing		
Liberal Democrats hold		Swing		

=== Exmouth Withycombe Raleigh ===
Exmouth Withycombe Raleigh
Party	Candidate	Votes	%	±%
Liberal Democrats	Steve Gazzard*	521	58.5	+58.5
Liberal Democrats	Matt Hall	432	48.5	+48.5
Conservative	Josh Donald	242	27.2	N/A
Labour	Andrew Woodward	236	26.5	N/A
Conservative	Brian Richards	218	24.5	N/A
Majority				
Turnout		890	25.1	
Liberal Democrats hold		Swing		
Liberal Democrats hold		Swing		

=== Feniton ===
Feniton
Party	Candidate	Votes	%	±%
Conservative	Alasdair Bruce*	359	51.6	+39.2
Green	Jane Collins	351	49.4	N/A
Majority				
Turnout		710	31.7	
Conservative gain from Independent		Swing		

=== Honiton St Michael's ===
Honiton St Michael's
Party	Candidate	Votes	%	±%
Conservative	Jenny Brown	708	47.9	−9.1
Labour	Violet Bonetta	598	40.5	N/A
Liberal	Roy Collins	534	36.2	N/A
Conservative	Brice Cornelius	531	36.0	−19.0
Conservative	Paul Carter	508	34.4	−3.8
Independent	Joanne Fotheringham	477	32.3	N/A
Independent	Nicholas Ingham	419	28.4	N/A
Majority				
Turnout		1,477	26.7	
Conservative hold		Swing		
Labour gain from Conservative		Swing		
Liberal gain from Liberal Democrats		Swing		

=== Honiton St Paul's ===
Honiton St Paul's
Party	Candidate	Votes	%	±%
Independent	Tony McCollum*	642	58.6	+3.8
Conservative	John Diviani-O'Leary	460	42.0	+8.6
Conservative	Andrew Pearsall	454	41.4	+8.1
No Description	John Taylor	329	30.0	N/A
Majority				
Turnout		1,096	22.8	
Independent hold		Swing		
Conservative hold		Swing		

=== Newbridges ===
Newbridges
Party	Candidate	Votes	%	±%
Conservative	Iain Chubb*	423	49.7	−24.4
Liberal Democrats	Veronica Dower	335	39.4	N/A
Labour	Clara Douglas	93	10.9	−15.0
Majority				
Turnout		851	41.0	
Conservative hold		Swing		

=== Newton Poppleford & Harpford ===
Newton Poppleford & Harpford
Party	Candidate	Votes	%	±%
Independent	Christopher Burhop*	633	82.1	N/A
Conservative	Josh Harrison	138	17.9	+4.1
Majority				
Turnout		771	42.7	
Independent gain from East Devon Alliance		Swing		

=== Ottery St Mary ===
Ottery St Mary
Party	Candidate	Votes	%	±%
Independent	Vicky Johns*	1,565	70.8	+3.1
Independent	Peter Faithfull*	944	42.7	+3.1
Labour	Bethany Collins	794	35.9	+18.7
Liberal Democrats	Jamie Aylward	771	34.9	N/A
Liberal Democrats	Graham Woolnough	556	25.1	N/A
Conservative	Charlie Hobson	429	19.4	−2.1
Conservative	Mohammed Sarul Islam	192	8.7	−10.6
Conservative	Mohammed Zayan Islam	153	6.9	−4.2
Majority				
Turnout		2,212	36.0	
Independent hold		Swing		
Independent hold		Swing		
Labour gain from Independent		Swing		

=== Seaton ===
Seaton
Party	Candidate	Votes	%	±%
Independent	Dan Ledger*	1,404	65.7	+0.8
Conservative	Marcus Hartnell*	1,167	54.6	+9.1
Conservative	Derek Haggerty	858	40.1	+19.2
Liberal Democrats	Steve Hunt	770	36.0	+14.6
Labour	Honey Barlow Marshall	494	23.1	+10.7
Majority				
Turnout		2,138	36.3	
Independent gain from East Devon Alliance		Swing		
Conservative gain from East Devon Alliance		Swing		
Conservative hold		Swing		

=== Sidmouth Rural ===
Sidmouth Rural
Party	Candidate	Votes	%	±%
Independent	John Loudoun*	586	73.0	+30.7
Conservative	Christina Richards	217	27.0	+6.2
Majority				
Turnout		803	42.3	
Independent gain from East Devon Alliance		Swing		

=== Sidmouth Sidford ===
Sidmouth Sidford
Party	Candidate	Votes	%	±%
Liberal Democrats	Marianne Rixson*	1,256	53.0	−20.5
Conservative	Stuart Hughes*	1,216	51.3	−9.1
Conservative	Mike Goodman	1,191	50.3	+8.3
Liberal Democrats	Lisa Garner	1,119	47.2	N/A
Majority				
Turnout		2,370	37.5	
Liberal Democrats gain from East Devon Alliance		Swing		
Conservative gain from East Devon Alliance		Swing		
Conservative hold		Swing		

=== Sidmouth Town ===
Sidmouth Town
Party	Candidate	Votes	%	±%
Independent	Ian Barlow	994	60.6	N/A
Conservative	Charlotte Richards	811	49.4	−15.2
Independent	Denise Bickley*	785	47.8	−9.7
Conservative	John Zarczynski	406	24.7	−0.8
Majority				
Turnout		1,641	43.3	
Independent gain from East Devon Alliance		Swing		
Conservative gain from East Devon Alliance		Swing		

=== Tale Vale ===
Tale Vale
Party	Candidate	Votes	%	±%
Liberal Democrats	Richard Jefferies	627	59.8	+18.1
Conservative	Philip Skinner*	421	40.2	−7.9
Majority				
Turnout		1,048	48.3	
Liberal Democrats gain from Conservative		Swing		

=== Trinity ===
Trinity
Party	Candidate	Votes	%	±%
Liberal Democrats	Susan Westerman	512	53.7	N/A
Conservative	Andy Turner	441	46.3	−25.5
Majority				
Turnout		953	43.8	
Liberal Democrats gain from Conservative		Swing		

=== West Hill & Aylesbeare ===
West Hill & Aylesbeare
Party	Candidate	Votes	%	±%
Independent	Jess Bailey*	956	84.2	+7.2
Conservative	Alan Richardson	285	25.1	+2.1
Liberal Democrats	Iain Fairbarn	54	4.8	N/A
Majority				
Turnout		1,135	51.4	
Independent hold		Swing		

=== Whimple & Rockbeare ===
Whimple & Rockbeare
Party	Candidate	Votes	%	±%
Liberal Democrats	Todd Olive	440	51.0	N/A
Conservative	Richard Lawrence*	422	49.0	+24.0
Majority				
Turnout		862	40.0	
Liberal Democrats gain from Independent		Swing		

=== Woodbury & Lympstone ===
Woodbury & Lympstone
Party	Candidate	Votes	%	±%
Liberal Democrats	Geoff Jung*	929	53.9	−19.1
Conservative	Ben Ingham*	724	42.0	−34.0
Conservative	Cheryl McGauley	622	36.1	+13.5
Green	Alex Taylor	566	32.8	N/A
Labour	Amanda Ford	286	16.6	N/A
Majority				
Turnout		1,724	41.0	
Liberal Democrats gain from Independent		Swing		
Conservative gain from Independent		Swing		

=== Yarty ===
Yarty
Party	Candidate	Votes	%	±%
Liberal Democrats	Duncan MacKinder	442	52.3	+41.8
Conservative	Richard Norman	328	38.8	+7.3
Green	Duncan Staddon	75	8.9	N/A
Majority				
Turnout		845	40.0	
Liberal Democrats gain from East Devon Alliance		Swing		

== Post-election changes ==
=== Affiliation changes ===
- Alasdair Bruce, elected as a Conservative in 2023, left the party in February 2024 to sit as an independent in the Independent Group.
- Daniel Wilson, elected for Labour in 2023, left the party in April 2024 to sit as an ungrouped independent.
- Bethany Collins, elected for Labour in 2023, left the party in May 2024 to sit as an independent in the Democratic Alliance Group.
- Del Haggerty, elected as a Conservative in 2023, left the party in June 2024 to sit as an independent in the Democratic Alliance Group.

=== By-elections ===
==== Exmouth Brixington ====
Exmouth Brixington by-election, 2 May 2024
Party	Candidate	Votes	%	±%
Conservative	Aurora Bailey	586	37.2	−1.5
Liberal Democrats	Dianne Conduit	513	32.6	−0.7
Labour	Julie Bennett	339	21.5	−10.6
Green	Michael Rosser	136	8.6	−16.3
Majority		73	4.6	N/A
Turnout		1,593	26.1	−2.3
Registered electors		6,110		
Conservative hold		Swing		

By-election triggered by resignation of Conservative councillor Fred Caygill.

==== Exe Valley ====
Exe Valley by-election: 13 March 2025
Party	Candidate	Votes	%	±%
Liberal Democrats	Fabian King	256	44.0	–26.5
Conservative	Patsy Hayman	137	23.5	–6.0
Reform	Nat Vanstone	135	23.2	N/A
Labour	Julie Bennett	54	9.3	N/A
Majority		119	20.5	–20.5
Turnout		582		
Registered electors		2,042		
Liberal Democrats hold		Swing	▼10.3	

==== Exmouth Halsdon ====
Exmouth Halsdon by-election: 4 December 2025
Party	Candidate	Votes	%	±%
Liberal Democrats	Fran McElhone	551	35.9	–4.0
Reform	Tony Quinn	438	28.5	N/A
Conservative	Paula Burtoft	393	25.6	–4.1
Green	Tony Woodward	153	10.0	N/A
Majority		113	7.4	N/A
Turnout		1,535	25.5	–7.7
Registered electors		6,045		
Liberal Democrats hold		Swing		

==== Seaton ====
Seaton by-election: 11 December 2025
Party	Candidate	Votes	%	±%
Liberal Democrats	Steve Hunt	789	41.3	+21.2
Reform	Simon Day	565	29.6	N/A
Conservative	Karen Boyes	400	20.9	−9.5
Independent	Paul Johns	156	8.2	N/A
Majority		224	11.6	N/A
Turnout		1,919	32.0	−4.3
Registered electors		6,042		
Liberal Democrats gain from Conservative		Swing		

==== Exmouth Brixington ====
Exmouth Brixington by-election: 23 July 2026 Resignation of Maddy Chapman (Conservative)
Party	Candidate	Votes	%	±%
Conservative	Lee Mason	537	35.1	+9.2
Liberal Democrats	Andrew Colman	450	29.4	+9.0
Reform	Paul Thomas	439	28.7	N/A
Green	Mike Rosser	101	6.6	−8.8
Majority		87	5.7	N/A
Turnout		1,529	24.0	–4.4
Conservative hold		Swing	▲0.1	

==== Honiton St Michael's ====
Honiton St Michael's by-election: 13 August 2026 Resignation of Violet Bonetta (Labour)
Party	Candidate	Votes	%	±%
Liberal Democrats	Rhys Wallis	727	45.4	N/A
Reform	Humphrey Clemens	401	25.0	N/A
Conservative	Paul Carter	321	20.3	−10.3
Independent	Jo Fotheringham	74	4.6	−16.0
Labour	Jack Stacey	55	3.4	−22.4
Independent	John Taylor	19	1.2	N/A
Majority		326	20.4	N/A
Turnout		1,597	28.9	+2.2
Registered electors		5,532		
Liberal Democrats gain from Labour				
