= East Devon =

Coordinates: 50.679°N 3.239°W

East Devon District
- Non-metropolitan district
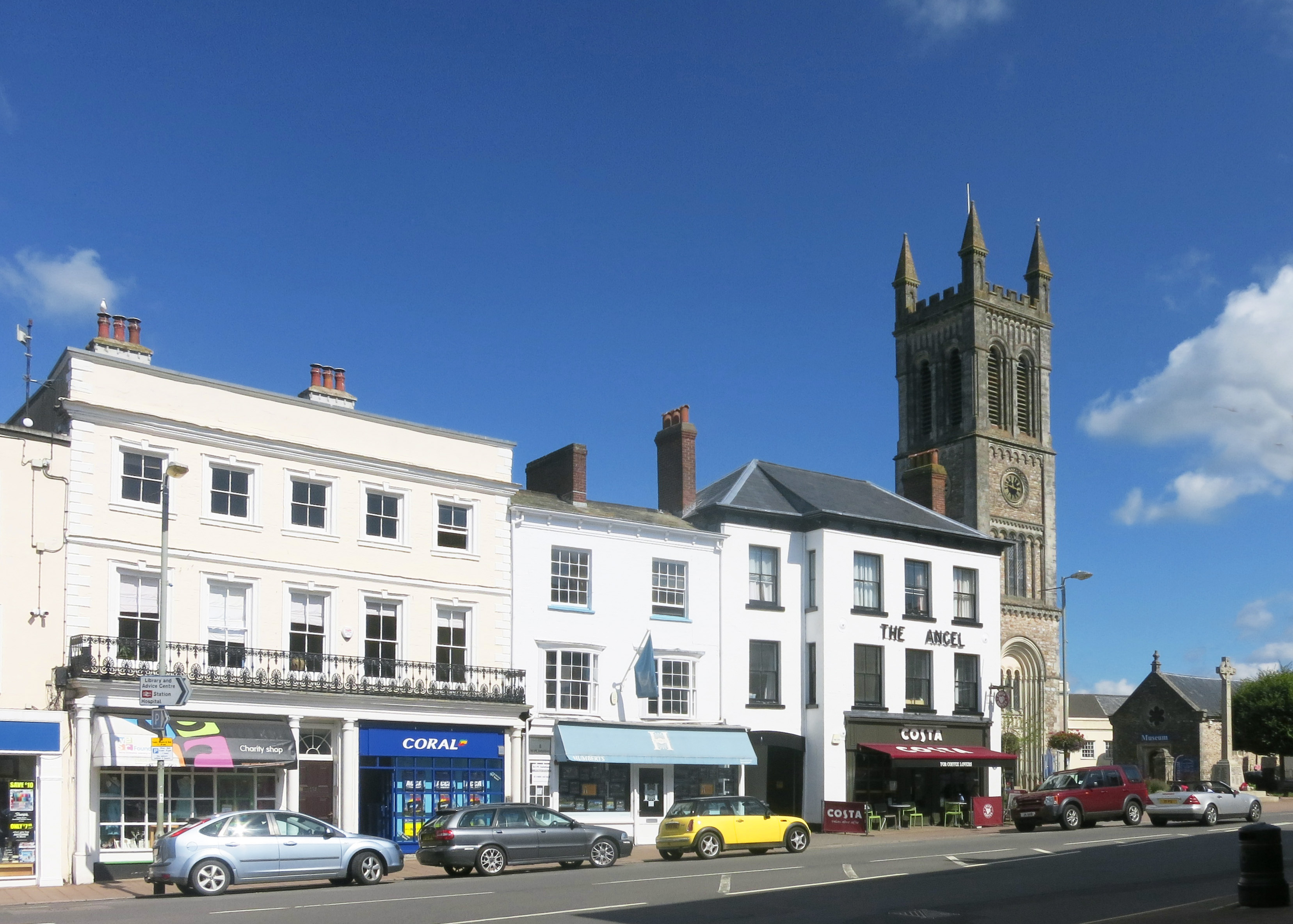
- Honiton town centre

- East Devon shown within Devon
- Sovereign state: United Kingdom
- Constituent country: England
- Region: South West England
- Non-metropolitan county: Devon
- Status: Non-metropolitan district
- Admin HQ: Honiton
- Incorporated: 1 April 1974

Government
  - Type: Non-metropolitan district council
  - Body: East Devon District Council
  - Leadership: Leader & Cabinet
  - MPs: Richard Foord; David Reed

Area
  - Total: 314.4 sq mi (814.4 km^{2})
  - Rank: 40th (of 296)

Population (2024)
  - Total: 158,239
  - Rank: 141st (of 296)
  - Density: 503.2/sq mi (194.3/km^{2})
  - Ethnicity: 97.4% White (94.2% White British)
- Time zone: UTC0 (GMT)
  - Summer (DST): UTC+1 (BST)
- ONS code: 18UB (ONS); E07000040 (GSS)
- OS grid reference: SY1247187389

East Devon is a local government district in Devon, England. Its council is based in the town of Honiton, although Exmouth is the largest town. The district also contains the towns of Axminster, Budleigh Salterton, Cranbrook, Ottery St Mary, Seaton and Sidmouth, along with numerous villages and surrounding rural areas.

The district borders Teignbridge and Exeter to the west, Mid Devon to the north, Somerset to the north-east, and Dorset to the east.

Two areas of the district are designated as National Landscapes (formerly Areas of Outstanding Natural Beauty): the Blackdown Hills in the north of the district and the East Devon National Landscape along much of the district’s coast and adjoining countryside. The East Devon coastline from Exmouth to the border with Dorset is also part of the designated World Heritage Site of the Jurassic Coast; the designated area continues into Dorset as far as the Old Harry Rocks near Swanage.

== Geography ==
East Devon is located in south-east Devon, extending from the eastern outskirts of Exeter to the county boundary with Dorset. It forms part of the South West England peninsula and encompasses a varied landscape of coastal cliffs, estuaries, river valleys, rolling farmland and heathland.

The district includes sections of two designated National Landscapes: the Blackdown Hills National Landscape in the north, and the East Devon National Landscape along much of the coastline and adjoining countryside. The coastal fringe between Exmouth and the Dorset border is also part of the Jurassic Coast UNESCO World Heritage Site.

=== River systems ===
The River Exe forms the western boundary of much of the district and is a major defining geographical feature. Its estuary broadens at Exmouth to form the Exe Estuary, a nationally important landscape for wildlife, recreation and floodplain management, and a key natural separation between East Devon and the City of Exeter.

The River Otter is the principal river wholly within the district, flowing southwards from the Blackdown Hills to the sea at Budleigh Salterton. The River Axe forms part of the eastern boundary of the district before entering Lyme Bay. Smaller rivers include the Clyst and the Sid, both of which drain into the Exe estuary system or directly into the English Channel.

=== Lowland heath and uplands ===
A significant proportion of the district is covered by lowland heath, particularly the Pebblebed Heaths to the west of the district near Exmouth and Woodbury Common. These form one of the largest surviving areas of lowland heath in southern England and are of high ecological importance. The area supports internationally rare habitats and species and is designated as a Site of Special Scientific Interest and Special Area of Conservation.

The northern part of the district includes the Blackdown Hills, a plateau of Upper Greensand capped with clay-with-flints, forming part of the Blackdown Hills National Landscape.

=== Geology ===
East Devon is geologically significant for its coastal exposures of Triassic and Jurassic formations, forming part of the Jurassic Coast World Heritage Site. These cliffs provide internationally important fossil records and demonstrate a continuous sequence of rock strata spanning the Mesozoic era.

Inland geology is dominated by sandstone, mudstone and greensand formations, while the Blackdown Hills are characterised by Upper Greensand deposits with overlying clay-with-flints.

=== Coastline and landscapes ===
The coastline is characterised by cliffs, beaches and estuaries, including the Exe Estuary at Exmouth and the Sidmouth and Beer cliff systems. These landscapes are subject to ongoing coastal erosion, which plays a significant role in shaping the Jurassic Coast and influences long-term coastal management strategies.

Land use across the district is predominantly agricultural in inland areas, with pasture and mixed farming being the most common forms. Coastal settlements have a stronger focus on tourism and residential use, particularly in areas with high landscape and heritage value.

According to the Office for National Statistics, East Devon covers an area of approximately 814 km², making it one of the larger non-metropolitan districts in England by land area.

== Demography ==
At the 2021 United Kingdom census, East Devon had a population of 150,828. This represented an increase from 132,457 in 2011, a growth of around 13.9%, reflecting a combination of net inward migration and natural change.

Mid-year population estimates from the Office for National Statistics indicate continued growth to approximately 158,000 in 2024. Population growth has been steady but uneven across the district, with higher rates in planned development areas such as Cranbrook and more limited change in some rural parishes.

East Devon has a markedly older age structure than England as a whole. In the 2021 census, around 30% of residents were aged 65 and over, compared with a national average of approximately 18.6%, while the proportion aged under 16 was lower than the national figure. The ageing profile is particularly pronounced in coastal settlements such as Sidmouth, Budleigh Salterton and Seaton, reflecting retirement migration patterns as well as long-term housing affordability pressures affecting younger households.

The district has relatively high levels of owner-occupation and a lower proportion of private rented housing than England overall, consistent with its older age profile and relatively stable, long-established population.

In terms of health, East Devon has a higher proportion of residents reporting “good” or “very good” health than many comparable districts, although the older age structure is associated with higher levels of long-term illness and disability, particularly among older age groups.

The 2021 census recorded the population as predominantly White, with over 95% of residents identifying within White ethnic categories, including White British as the largest single group. The district therefore has relatively low ethnic diversity compared with England as a whole, although modest increases have been recorded since 2011.

Overall, East Devon’s demography is characterised by sustained population growth, a pronounced ageing profile, and a relatively stable long-term resident population.

== History ==
The district was formed on 1 April 1974 under the Local Government Act 1972, which reorganised local government in England and Wales into a two-tier system of counties and non-metropolitan districts. East Devon was created by merging the whole areas of eight former districts and part of a ninth, all of which were abolished at the same time.

These were:

- Axminster Rural District
- Budleigh Salterton Urban District
- Exmouth Urban District
- Honiton Municipal Borough
- Honiton Rural District
- Ottery St Mary Urban District
- St Thomas Rural District (north-eastern parts only; remainder transferred to Teignbridge)
- Seaton Urban District
- Sidmouth Urban District

The new authority was named East Devon to reflect its geographical position within the county of Devon.

Under current local government restructuring plans it is planned that the district will be abolished in 2028 with its area become split between new unitary authorities for Exeter and Devon. Shadow elections to the new authorities will take place in May 2027.

== Governance ==
East Devon District Council

Type
- Type: Non-metropolitan district council

History
- Founded: 1 April 1974

Leadership
- Chair: Eleanor Rylance, Liberal Democrat since 24 May 2023
- Leader: Paul Arnott, Liberal Democrat since 29 May 2020
- Chief Executive: Tracy Hendren since May 2024

Structure
- Seats: 60 councillors
- Graph of the party split among 68 seats.
- Political groups: Administration (32) Liberal Democrats (22) Green (3) Independent (7) Other parties (28) Conservative (12) Liberal (1) Independent (15)

Elections
- Voting system: First-past-the-post
- Last election: 4 May 2023

Meeting place
- Blackdown House, Border Road, Honiton, EX14 1EJ

Website
- www.eastdevon.gov.uk

Constitution
- The Constitution of the East Devon District Council

East Devon District Council provides district-level services. County-level services are provided by Devon County Council. The whole district is also covered by civil parishes, which form a third tier of local government.

=== Political control ===
The council has been under no overall control since 2019. From May 2020 to May 2023, it was run by a political grouping composed of Liberal Democrats, Greens and Independents. Since the 2023 election the council has again been run by a coalition of the Liberal Democrats, Greens and some of the independent councillors. Paul Arnott was re-appointed leader of the council after the election, this time as a Liberal Democrat, having previously led as a member of the East Devon Alliance, which did not stand any candidates in 2023.

The first election to the council was held in 1973, initially operating as a shadow authority before coming into its powers on 1 April 1974. Political control of the council since 1974 has been held by the following parties:

Party in control	Years
Independent	1974–1976
Conservative	1976–1995
No overall control	1995–1999
Conservative	1999–2019
No overall control	2019–present

=== Leadership ===
The leaders of the council since 2001 have been:

Councillor	Party	From	To
Sara Randall Johnson	Conservative	2001	May 2011
Paul Diviani	Conservative	25 May 2011	16 May 2018
Ian Thomas	Conservative	16 May 2018	May 2019
Ben Ingham	Independent	22 May 2019	18 May 2020
Paul Arnott	East Devon Alliance	29 May 2020	May 2023
Paul Arnott	Liberal Democrats	May 2023	

=== Composition ===
Following the 2023 election, and subsequent changes of allegiance and by-elections up to August 2026, the composition of the council was:

Party	Seats
Liberal Democrats	22
Conservative	12
Green	3
Liberal	1
Independent	22
Total	60

The Liberal Democrats, Greens and seven of the independent councillors sit together as the "Democratic Alliance Group", which forms the council's administration. Of the other independent councillors, nine form the "Independent Group", three form the "Cranbrook Voice" group, one sits with the single Liberal councillor as the "Independent Councillor Group", and two others do not belong to a group.

=== Elections ===
Since the last boundary changes in 2019, the council has comprised 60 councillors representing 30 wards, with each ward electing one, two or three members under the multi-member first-past-the-post system. Elections are held every four years.

=== Parliamentary representation ===
East Devon District is divided between two parliamentary constituencies for elections to the House of Commons. These constituency boundaries do not exactly follow the district boundary, as they are drawn to achieve electoral parity across the wider region.

The constituencies are:

- Exmouth and Exeter East – covering Exmouth and parts of the Exeter urban fringe within East Devon, as well as areas within Exeter City Council
- Honiton and Sidmouth – covering the majority of the rural and coastal parts of East Devon, including Honiton, Sidmouth, Ottery St Mary and Seaton, as well as areas outside the district boundary

=== Premises ===
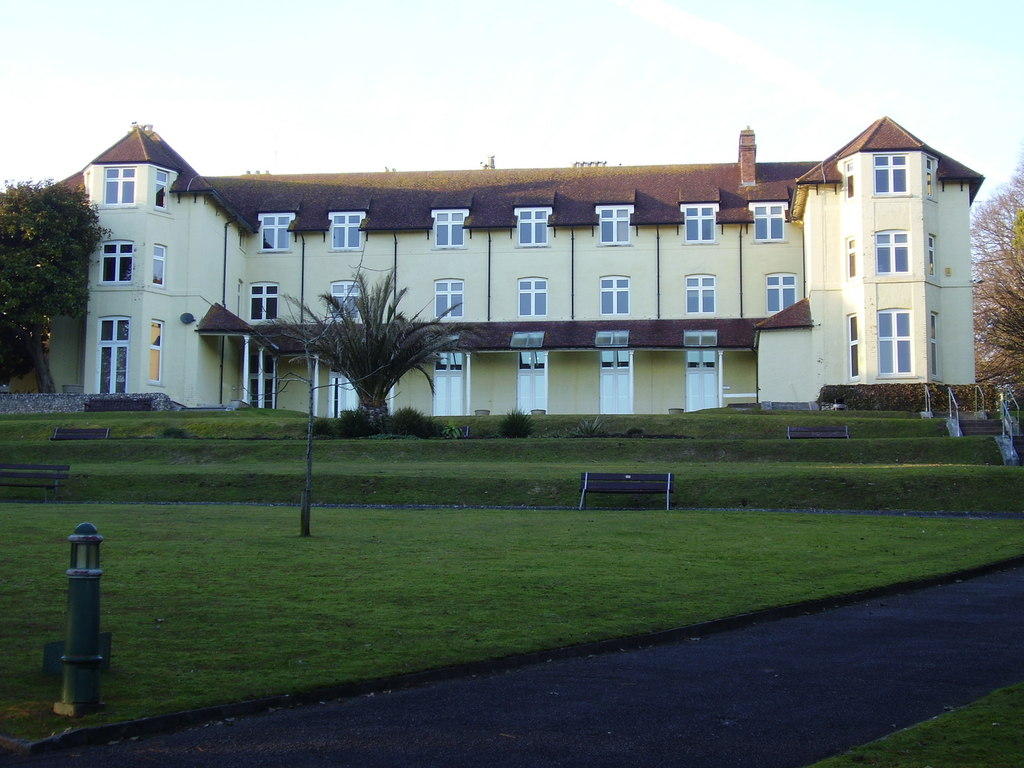
Knowle, Sidmouth: Council's headquarters until 2019.

In 2019 the council moved to new purpose-built offices called Blackdown House in Honiton. The building was officially opened on 27 February 2019. Prior to 2019 the council was based at Knowle, a large converted house in Sidmouth which had been the offices of the old Sidmouth Urban District Council since the 1960s, having previously been a hotel.

== Economy ==
The economy of East Devon is predominantly service-based, with key sectors including tourism, public services, agriculture, and commuting to nearby Exeter.

Tourism is a major component of the local economy, particularly along the Jurassic Coast at Exmouth, Sidmouth, Budleigh Salterton and Seaton. The coastline and surrounding countryside, including the East Devon and Blackdown Hills National Landscapes, attract significant numbers of visitors. The sector supports employment in accommodation, food services, retail, and leisure, with seasonal fluctuations in demand.

The district forms part of the wider Exeter functional economic area, with a substantial proportion of residents commuting to Exeter for employment in public administration, education, healthcare, and professional services. Commuting patterns reflect East Devon’s role as a predominantly residential and rural district within the Exeter labour market catchment.

Exeter Airport, located within the district near Clyst Honiton, is a significant regional transport hub and employer, supporting both aviation services and associated logistics and business activity.

Agriculture remains an important land use in the rural inland areas, particularly mixed farming, livestock rearing, and dairy production. However, as in most of South West England, agriculture accounts for a relatively small proportion of total employment.

Retail and local services are concentrated in the main settlements of Exmouth, Honiton, Sidmouth, Seaton, Axminster and Ottery St Mary. Several of these towns also function as market centres serving surrounding rural communities.

East Devon has relatively low levels of industrial activity, with manufacturing largely confined to small-scale and light industrial units. Economic development in the district is closely linked to housing delivery, infrastructure provision, and the management of tourism and environmental assets.

== Education ==
Education in East Devon is provided through a mixture of maintained schools and academies, with statutory responsibility for education services held by Devon County Council.

The district contains a number of secondary schools serving its dispersed rural and coastal population, including Sidmouth College, Exmouth Community College, The King's School (Ottery St Mary), and The Axe Valley Academy in Axminster. These schools commonly operate sixth forms offering A-level and vocational courses. Parts of the eastern fringe of the district are also served by schools in neighbouring Dorset, reflecting cross-boundary catchment patterns in rural areas.

Further education provision is mainly accessed in nearby Exeter, particularly at Exeter College, which offers a wide range of academic and vocational qualifications and serves a catchment that includes East Devon. Apprenticeships, traineeships and other work-based training routes are also widely used across the district.

Primary education is provided through a network of maintained and academy primary schools in towns and villages across East Devon, typically serving local catchment areas in rural settlements where provision is more dispersed.

There are no higher education institutions within East Devon. Higher education is primarily accessed in nearby Exeter, particularly at the University of Exeter, which serves as the main university provider for the wider region.

Population change within the district has influenced education demand, with housing growth in areas such as Cranbrook contributing to increased demand for school places, while some rural areas have experienced smaller cohorts in line with wider demographic ageing trends.

== Transport ==
East Devon is served by a mix of air, road and rail infrastructure, reflecting its rural character and coastal geography.

Exeter International Airport is located within the district, near the village of Clyst Honiton, and provides scheduled domestic and limited international services. It is the principal airport for Devon and the wider South West region.

Road access is provided in part by the M5 motorway, which passes through the western edge of the district, linking East Devon with Exeter, Bristol and the wider national motorway network. Several primary routes, including the A30 and A3052, provide east–west connectivity along the district’s coastal and inland corridors.

Rail services are provided by the West of England line, which runs through the district between Exeter and the Dorset border, serving stations including Exmouth, Honiton, Axminster and Whimple. The line provides connections to London Waterloo, Exeter and the South Coast.

== Media ==
East Devon falls within the broadcast areas of BBC South West and ITV West Country, which provide regional television news and programming for Devon and Cornwall.

Local radio services are provided by a mixture of BBC, commercial and community broadcasters. These include BBC Radio Devon, Heart West, and Greatest Hits Radio South West, alongside community stations such as Radio Exe and East Devon Radio.

Print media serving the district is primarily based in Exeter and surrounding towns, with coverage provided by regional and local titles. These include the Express & Echo, the Exmouth Journal, the Sidmouth Herald and the Midweek Herald, which together cover news from across East Devon and neighbouring areas of Devon and Dorset.

== Towns and parishes ==
East Devon is entirely divided into civil parishes. The parish councils for Axminster, Budleigh Salterton, Cranbrook, Exmouth, Honiton, Ottery St Mary, Seaton and Sidmouth take the style "town council".

== See also ==
- Grade I listed buildings in East Devon
- Grade II* listed buildings in East Devon
- East Devon National Landscape
- Jurassic Coast
- List of Sites of Special Scientific Interest in Devon
