= 1979 Clitheroe by-election =

UK parliamentary by-election

On 1 March 1979 a by-election was held for the UK House of Commons constituency of Clitheroe in Lancashire. It was won by the Conservative Party candidate David Waddington.

== Vacancy ==
The seat had become vacant when the Conservative Member of Parliament (MP), David Walder had died at the age of 49 on 26 October 1978. He had held the seat since the 1970 general election, having previously been MP for High Peak in Derbyshire.

== Candidates ==
The Conservative candidate was 49-year-old David Waddington, a barrister who had been MP for Nelson and Colne from 1968 until his defeat at the October 1974 general election. The Labour Party candidate was Lindsay Sutton, and the Liberals fielded Frank Wilson.

== Result ==
The result was a clear victory for Waddington, with a massively increased majority of 36.6% of the votes. The Labour vote fell by a few percent, but the Liberal share of the vote collapsed to 6.6% from its 20.8% high in October 1974. The Liberal candidate also lost their deposit.

Waddington held the seat until its abolition for the 1983 general election, when he was returned for the new Ribble Valley constituency. He went on to become Home Secretary and Leader of the House of Lords.

Clitheroe by-election, 1979
Party	Candidate	Votes	%	±%
Conservative	David Waddington	22,185	65.0	+17.0
Labour	Lindsay Sutton	9,685	28.4	−2.8
Liberal	Frank Wilson	2,242	6.6	−14.2
Majority		12,500	36.6	+19.8
Turnout		34,112		
Conservative hold		Swing	+9.9	

== Previous election ==
General election October 1974: Clitheroe
Party	Candidate	Votes	%	±%
Conservative	David Walder	19,643	48.0	+0.2
Labour	B. McColgan	12,775	31.2	+3.2
Liberal	C. W. Roberts	8,503	20.8	−3.4
Majority		6,868	16.8	−3.0
Turnout		40,921	78.6	−5.0
Conservative hold		Swing	−1.5	

== See also ==
- Clitheroe constituency
- The town of Clitheroe
- List of United Kingdom by-elections
