= Farnham (constituency) =

Former parliamentary constituency in the United Kingdom

Coordinates: 51.214°N 0.796°W

- Former county constituency for the House of Commons
- County: Surrey

1918–1983
- Seats: one
- Created from: Chertsey (Majority); Guildford (western and south-western parts of)
- Replaced by: South West Surrey (Majority); Guildford (Seale and Tongham)
- During its existence contributed to new seat(s) of: Woking (Majority, 1950)

Farnham was a constituency covering the south-westernmost and various western parts of Surrey for the House of Commons of the UK Parliament, 1918—1983. Its main successor was South West Surrey. The seat was formed with north-eastern territory including Woking from Chertsey in 1918 and shed the Woking area to form its own seat in 1950. It elected one Member of Parliament (MP). During its 65-year span its voters elected three Conservatives successively.

== Boundaries ==
The constituency took its name from the town of Farnham and included other towns and a large agricultural and forested hills area with significant sandy heathland rising up to the north. The boundaries were altered at each redistribution of parliamentary seats, reflecting the increase in population of the area and thus the splitting of Western Surrey (or Guildford) into South West Surrey or Guildford and North West Surrey, followed by South West Surrey, most of Surrey Heath, and Guildford covering this part of Surrey, the arrangement by 1983.

=== 1918–1950 ===
The constituency was created by the Representation of the People Act 1918 as one of seven county constituencies within Surrey.

The rural district of Farnham (based on the Hundred before it); in the Guildford Rural District — the civil parish Pirbright; and the Farnham, Frimley (including Camberley), Windlesham, (Note: As such including the later Bagshot Rural District, the contents of which were transferred to Chertsey in 1950) and Woking urban districts.

=== 1950–1983 ===
Rural Surrey had ten county constituencies in 1950 — Farnham was defined as comprising: (Note: Constituencies in Great Britain were redrawn by the Representation of the People Act 1948 leading to seats contested at the 1950 general election.)

- The borough of Godalming;
- the urban districts of Farnham and Haslemere;
- the parish of Seale in the rural district of Guildford (including Tongham)
- Parishes in the rural district of Hambledon: Chiddingfold, Dockenfield, Elstead, Frensham, Peper Harow, Thursley, Tilford and Witley.

To enable the above, Godalming and Haslemere were transferred from Guildford — Woking, Windlesham and Pirbright were transferred to the new seat of Woking.

The constituency was unaltered at the redistribution of 1974 which coincided with a major local government consolidation, the main local authority approximating to the seat becoming Waverley (district). (Note: Equally no changes were proposed to Farnham were proposed in the Boundary Commission for England's Third periodic review of Westminster seats)

== Type for returning officer and election expenses ==
The seat was a county constituency.

== Members of Parliament ==
Election	Member	Party	Notes
1918	Sir Arthur Samuel	Conservative	
1937 by-election	Godfrey Nicholson	Conservative	Member for Morpeth (1955–1964)
Constituency split, majority renamed Woking, minority merged with part of Guildford
1950	Godfrey Nicholson	Conservative	
1966	Maurice Macmillan	Conservative	Secretary of State for Employment (1972–1973); Member for Halifax (1964–1966); Contested South West Surrey following redistribution
1983	Constituency abolished: see South West Surrey		

== Elections ==
=== Elections in the 1910s ===
General election 1918: Farnham
Party		Candidate	Votes	%
C	Unionist	Arthur Samuel	7,558	52.5
	Labour	John Hayes	3,534	24.6
	Ind. Unionist	John Henry Harris	3,289	22.9
Majority			4,024	27.9
Turnout			14,381	44.0
Registered electors			32,720	
	Unionist win (new seat)			
C indicates candidate endorsed by the coalition government.

=== Elections in the 1920s ===
General election 1922: Farnham
Party	Candidate	Votes	%	±%
Unionist	Arthur Samuel	14,557	73.3	+20.8
Labour	Thomas Humphrey Marshall	5,312	26.7	+2.1
Majority		9,245	46.6	+18.7
Turnout		19,869	56.8	+12.8
Registered electors		34,980		
Unionist hold		Swing	+9.4	

General election 1923: Farnham
Party	Candidate	Votes	%	±%
Unionist	Arthur Samuel	12,534	59.6	−13.7
Liberal	Christopher a'Beckett Williams	4,979	23.7	New
Labour	Anne Corner	3,520	16.7	−10.0
Majority		7,555	35.9	−10.7
Turnout		21,033	59.6	+2.8
Registered electors		35,314		
Unionist hold		Swing	−1.9	

General election 1924: Farnham
Party	Candidate	Votes	%	±%
Unionist	Arthur Samuel	18,272	79.8	+20.2
Labour	Anne Corner	4,613	20.2	+3.5
Majority		13,659	59.6	+23.7
Turnout		22,885	63.1	+3.5
Registered electors		36,255		
Unionist hold		Swing	+8.4	

General election 1929: Farnham
Party	Candidate	Votes	%	±%
Unionist	Arthur Samuel	21,050	59.8	−20.0
Liberal	John William Todd	9,268	26.3	New
Labour	Francis Palmer	4,866	13.8	−6.4
Majority		11,782	33.6	−26.0
Turnout		35,184	66.9	+3.8
Registered electors		52,597		
Unionist hold		Swing	−6.8	

=== Elections in the 1930s ===
1931 general election: Farnham
Party	Candidate	Votes	%	±%
Conservative	Arthur Samuel	Unopposed		
Conservative hold				

1935 general election: Farnham
Party	Candidate	Votes	%	±%
Conservative	Arthur Samuel	28,211	78.5	N/A
Labour	Donald M. Fraser	7,725	21.5	New
Majority		20,486	57.0	N/A
Turnout		35,936		
Conservative hold		Swing		

1937 Farnham by-election
Party	Candidate	Votes	%	±%
Conservative	Godfrey Nicholson	20,580	66.7	−11.8
Labour	Peter Pain	7,792	25.3	+3.8
Ind. Conservative	Linton Thorp	2,327	7.5	New
Independent	Edward Miller	154	0.5	New
Majority		12,788	41.4	−15.6
Turnout		30,853		
Conservative hold		Swing		

General Election 1939–40

Another General Election was required to take place before the end of 1940. The political parties had been making preparations for an election to take place and by the Autumn of 1939, the following candidates had been selected;

- Conservative: Godfrey Nicholson
- Labour: C W Gittins

=== Elections in the 1940s ===
General election 1945: Farnham
Party	Candidate	Votes	%	±%
Conservative	Godfrey Nicholson	31,557	61.19	
Labour	Thomas W Gittins	20,013	38.81	
Majority		11,544	22.38	
Turnout		51,570	68.72	
Conservative hold		Swing		

=== Elections in the 1950s ===
General election 1950: Farnham
Party	Candidate	Votes	%
Conservative	Godfrey Nicholson	21,665	55.70
Labour	Eric Charles Neate	12,972	33.35
Liberal	Frederick Patrick Shannon	4,262	10.96
Majority		8,693	22.35
Turnout		38,899	83.11
Registered electors			
Conservative win (new boundaries)			

General election 1951: Farnham
Party	Candidate	Votes	%	±%
Conservative	Godfrey Nicholson	24,239	63.32	
Labour	Charles Leonard James	14,041	36.68	
Majority		10,198	26.64	
Turnout		38,280	80.44	
Conservative hold		Swing		

General election 1955: Farnham
Party	Candidate	Votes	%	±%
Conservative	Godfrey Nicholson	23,717	64.93	
Labour	John Stuart Paul Davey	12,811	35.07	
Majority		10,906	29.86	
Turnout		36,528	76.32	
Conservative hold		Swing		

General election 1959: Farnham
Party	Candidate	Votes	%	±%
Conservative	Godfrey Nicholson	23,538	59.03	
Labour	Joseph Greenwood Turner	9,800	24.58	
Liberal	Dennis William Saunders	6,538	16.40	N/A
Majority		13,738	34.45	
Turnout		39,876	79.36	
Conservative hold		Swing		

=== Elections in the 1960s ===
General election 1964: Farnham
Party	Candidate	Votes	%	±%
Conservative	Godfrey Nicholson	21,382	51.20	
Liberal	Dennis William Saunders	11,876	28.44	
Labour	Kenneth Frank Urwin	8,500	20.36	
Majority		9,506	22.76	
Turnout		41,758	78.71	
Conservative hold		Swing		

General election 1966: Farnham
Party	Candidate	Votes	%	±%
Conservative	Maurice Macmillan	21,028	48.84	
Liberal	Dennis William Saunders	12,036	27.96	
Labour	Leslie G R Pinchen	9,988	23.20	
Majority		8,922	20.88	
Turnout		43,052	80.00	
Conservative hold		Swing		

=== Elections in the 1970s ===
General election 1970: Farnham
Party	Candidate	Votes	%	±%
Conservative	Maurice Macmillan	25,113	56.87	
Liberal	Piers Millar Odger Stonham	10,178	23.05	
Labour	Leslie G R Pinchen	8,870	20.09	
Majority		14,935	33.82	
Turnout		44,161	73.59	
Conservative hold		Swing		

General election February 1974: Farnham
Party	Candidate	Votes	%	±%
Conservative	Maurice Macmillan	25,686	49.87	
Liberal	P Davies	19,224	37.32	
Labour	HC Hodge	6,347	12.32	
Independent	N Dane	251	0.49	N/A
Majority		6,462	12.55	
Turnout		51,508	82.96	
Conservative hold		Swing		

General election October 1974: Farnham
Party	Candidate	Votes	%	±%
Conservative	Maurice Macmillan	23,885	49.95	
Liberal	P Davies	15,626	32.68	
Labour	HC Hodge	8,305	17.37	
Majority		8,259	17.27	
Turnout		47,816	76.22	
Conservative hold		Swing		

General election 1979: Farnham
Party	Candidate	Votes	%	±%
Conservative	Maurice Macmillan	30,127	58.32	
Liberal	P Raynes	13,658	26.44	
Labour	PW Davies	7,497	14.51	
Independent - Citizens Protest Vote	SL Bradford	204	0.39	New
United Country Party	R Peel	170	0.33	New
Majority		16,469	31.88	
Turnout		51,656	79.95	
Conservative hold		Swing		

== Notes and references ==
Notes

- Leigh Rayment's Historical List of MPs – Constituencies beginning with "F"
