= Nigel Evans =

British Conservative politician (born 1957)

The Right Honourable Nigel Evans
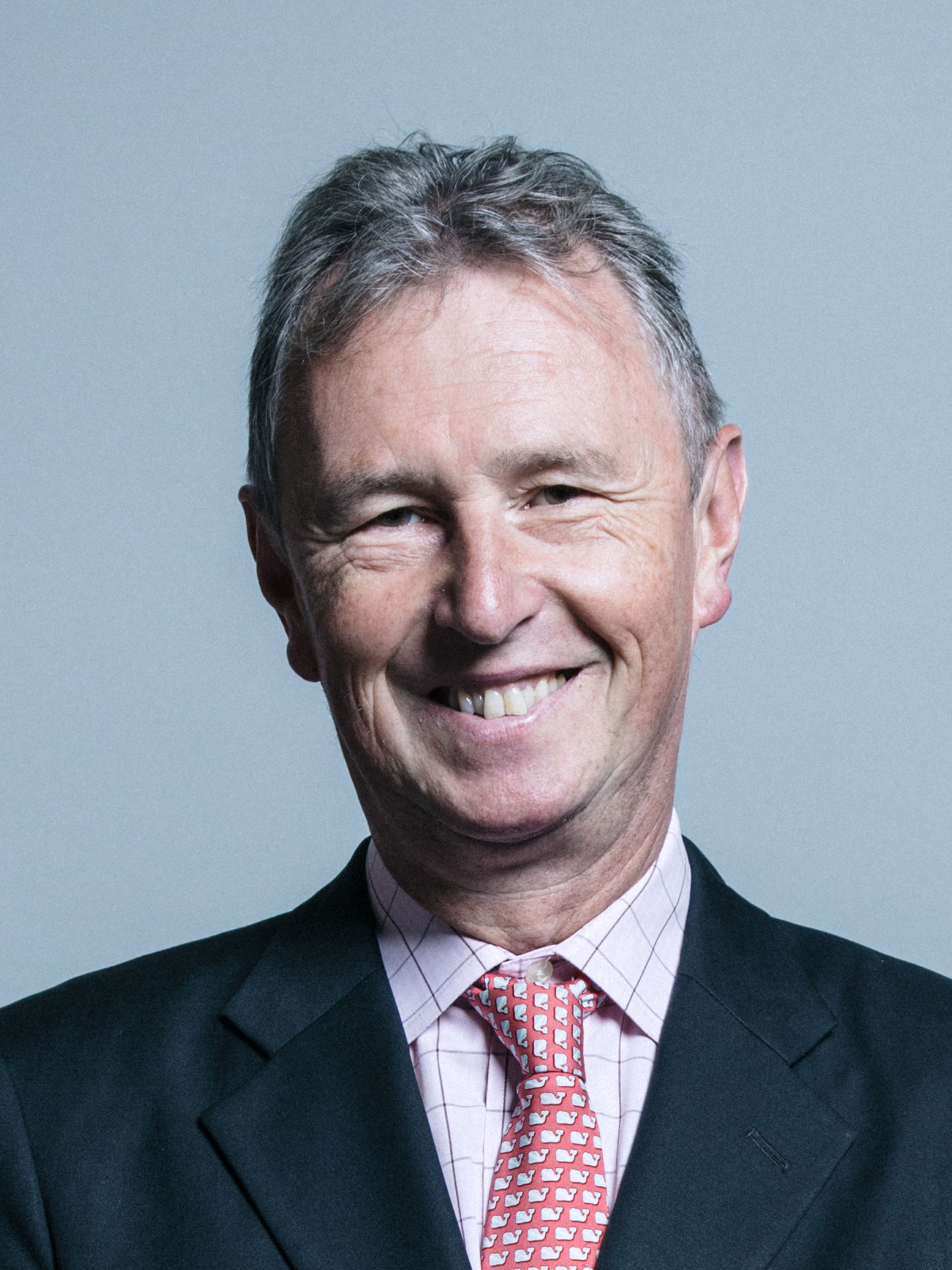
- Official portrait, 2017

Deputy Speaker of the House of Commons Second Deputy Chairman of Ways and Means
- In office 8 January 2020 – 30 May 2024
- Speaker: Lindsay Hoyle
- Preceded by: Rosie Winterton
- Succeeded by: Caroline Nokes

Executive Secretary of the 1922 Committee
- In office 11 October 2017 – 8 January 2020 Serving with Bob Blackman
- Leader: Theresa May; Boris Johnson
- Preceded by: Peter Bone & Christopher Chope
- Succeeded by: Gary Sambrook

Deputy Speaker of the House of Commons First Deputy Chairman of Ways and Means
- In office 8 June 2010 – 10 September 2013
- Speaker: John Bercow
- Preceded by: Sylvia Heal
- Succeeded by: Eleanor Laing

Shadow Secretary of State for Wales
- In office 11 June 2001 – 11 November 2003
- Leader: William Hague; Iain Duncan Smith; Michael Howard
- Preceded by: Angela Browning
- Succeeded by: Bill Wiggin

Member of Parliament for Ribble Valley
- In office 9 April 1992 – 30 May 2024
- Preceded by: Michael Carr
- Succeeded by: Maya Ellis

Personal details
- Born: Nigel Martin Evans; 10 November 1957 (age 68) Swansea, Wales
- Party: Conservative (until 2013, 2014–present); Independent (2013–2014)
- Education: Swansea University
- Website: Official website

Nigel Martin Evans (born 10 November 1957) is a former British Conservative Party politician who served as the Member of Parliament (MP) for Ribble Valley in Lancashire from 1992 until 2024. He was Joint Executive Secretary of the 1922 Committee from 2017 to 2019. He served as First Deputy Chairman of Ways and Means, one of the Speaker's three deputies, from 2010 to 2013. He was elected as Second Deputy Chairman of Ways and Means in 2020.

Evans is a strong critic of the European Union and supported Brexit in the 2016 EU Referendum. He has since been supportive of Leave Means Leave, a Eurosceptic campaign group and backed Boris Johnson for Prime Minister. He thereafter refrained from campaigning on issues such as Brexit in order to fulfill his role as one of the deputy speakers, until he lost his seat in 2024.

== Early life and career ==
Nigel Evans was born on 10 November 1957 in Swansea. He was educated at Dynevor School, and then went to Swansea University, where he gained a BA in politics in 1979. He was involved in the management of his family's newsagent's and convenience store in Swansea.

== Political career ==
In 1985, Evans was elected as a councillor to the West Glamorgan County Council. In 1990, he became the deputy Conservative group leader, before standing down as a councillor in 1991.

At the 1987 general election, Evans stood in Swansea West, coming second with 33% of the vote behind the incumbent Labour MP Alan Williams.

Evans was selected to contest the 1989 Pontypridd by-election, following the death of Brynmor John. At the election, he came third with 13.5% of the vote behind the Labour candidate Kim Howells and the Plaid Cymru candidate Syd Morgan.

Evans also stood in the 1991 Ribble Valley by-election, caused by the resignation of David Waddington to become the Leader of the House of Lords in 1990. At the election, Evans came second with 38.5% of the vote behind the Liberal Democrat candidate Michael Carr.

== Parliamentary career ==
At the 1992 general election, Evans was elected to Parliament as MP for Ribble Valley with 52.4% of the vote and a majority of 6,542. He made his maiden speech on 20 May 1992.

Evans was appointed as the Parliamentary Private Secretary (PPS) to Secretary of State for Employment David Hunt in 1993, and remained Hunt's PPS when he was appointed Chancellor of the Duchy of Lancaster in 1994. In 1995, Evans became the PPS to Tony Baldry the Minister of State at the Ministry of Agriculture, Fisheries and Food in 1995, and in 1996, he became the PPS to the new Secretary of State for Wales William Hague.

At the 1997 general election, Evans was re-elected as MP for Ribble Valley with a decreased vote share of 46.7% and an increased majority of 6,640. After the election, Evans was drafted onto the frontbench by former prime minister John Major as a spokesman on Welsh Affairs.

Evans was again re-elected at the 2001 general election, with an increased vote share of 51.5% and an increased majority of 11,238. He became a member of the Shadow Cabinet after the election under Iain Duncan Smith as the Shadow Secretary of State for Wales from 2001 to 2003. He had publicly criticised the government for not having a dedicated Secretary of State for Wales in a cabinet post, so when the new Conservative leader Michael Howard decided to take the role outside of the Shadow Cabinet, Evans chose to return to the backbenches.

He became a member of both the Trade and Industry and the Welsh Affairs Select committees in 2003. In November 2004, Evans was appointed a Vice-Chairman of the Conservative Party, with specific responsibility for overseeing Conservatives Abroad and mobilising the Conservative vote overseas.

At the 2005 general election, Evans was again re-elected with an increased vote share of 51.9% and an increased majority of 14,171.

He returned to the back benches on the election of David Cameron as party leader in 2005, deciding to dedicate more time to his work on the Council of Europe and Western European Union. He has been a member of the Culture Media and Sport Select Committee since 2005

In November 2009, Evans was ranked as the 570th most expensive MP out of the 646 MPs in the UK Parliament, based on his expenses claims. He was criticised for his £375 a month expense on phone bills, and his purchase of four digital cameras in 18 months. Evans later attracted criticism for saying that he struggled to live on his salary of over £64,000 per year. He responded by saying that the comments were made in jest.

Evans was again re-elected at the 2010 general election, with a decreased vote share of 50.3% and an increased majority of 14,769.

On 8 June 2010, Evans was elected First Deputy Chairman of Ways and Means, and a Deputy Speaker of the House of Commons. This was the first time the three Deputy Speakers had been elected by secret ballot of all MPs.

At the 2015 general election, Evans was again re-elected, with a decreased vote share of 48.6% and a decreased majority of 13,606.

Evans supported Brexit in the 2016 European Union referendum.

Evans is a supporter of the proposal to make 23 June a public holiday in the United Kingdom, to be known as British Independence Day. Following a Parliamentary debate on the topic, the announcement from the UK government in October 2016 to not proceed with the holiday at present, he said it was "a shame the government has made this decision, this is an absolute belter of an idea."

Evans was again re-elected at the snap 2017 general election, with an increased vote share of 57.8% and a decreased majority of 13,199. At the 2019 general election, he was again re-elected, with an increased vote share of 60.3% and an increased majority of 18,439.

On 8 January 2020, he was elected as Second Deputy Chairman of Ways and Means by the MPs.

Evans stood for re-election in the 2024 United Kingdom general election. He was defeated by Labour candidate Maya Ellis.

== Post-parliamentary career ==
Since his defeat at the 2024 general election, Evans has worked as a Senior Advisor at Fullbrook Strategies and a Consultant at Westminster & Whitehall Partners.

== Arrest and trial ==
On 4 May 2013, Evans was arrested on suspicion of rape and sexual assault. His trial began on 10 March 2014. He was acquitted of all charges on 10 April 2014. In 2012, he had supported cuts to legal aid which became part of the Legal Aid, Sentencing and Punishment of Offenders Act 2012 (LASPO); after losing his life savings defending himself in 2014, Evans said in 2018 that the experience had shown him that "It's wrong, completely wrong, to remove people's right to have expert legal representation ... We're definitely talking about justice being denied as a result of LASPO." Hannah Quirk, a criminal law lecturer at King's College London, referred to him as a victim of the so-called 'innocence tax'.

== Personal life ==
On 18 December 2010, following the death of his 86-year-old mother, Evans revealed to The Mail on Sunday that he was gay. He lives in Pendleton, Lancashire, a village in his former constituency.

Parliament of the United Kingdom
| Preceded by Michael Carr | Member of Parliament for Ribble Valley; 1992–2024 | Succeeded by Maya Ellis |
| Preceded by Sylvia Heal | First Deputy Chair of Ways and Means; 2010–2013 | Succeeded by Eleanor Laing |
| Preceded by Rosie Winterton | Second Deputy Chair of Ways and Means; 2020–2024 | Succeeded by Caroline Nokes |
Political offices
| Preceded by Angela Browning | Shadow Secretary of State for Wales; 2001–2003 | Succeeded by Bill Wiggin |
