= Maya Ellis =

British politician (born c. 1988)

Maya Ellis MP
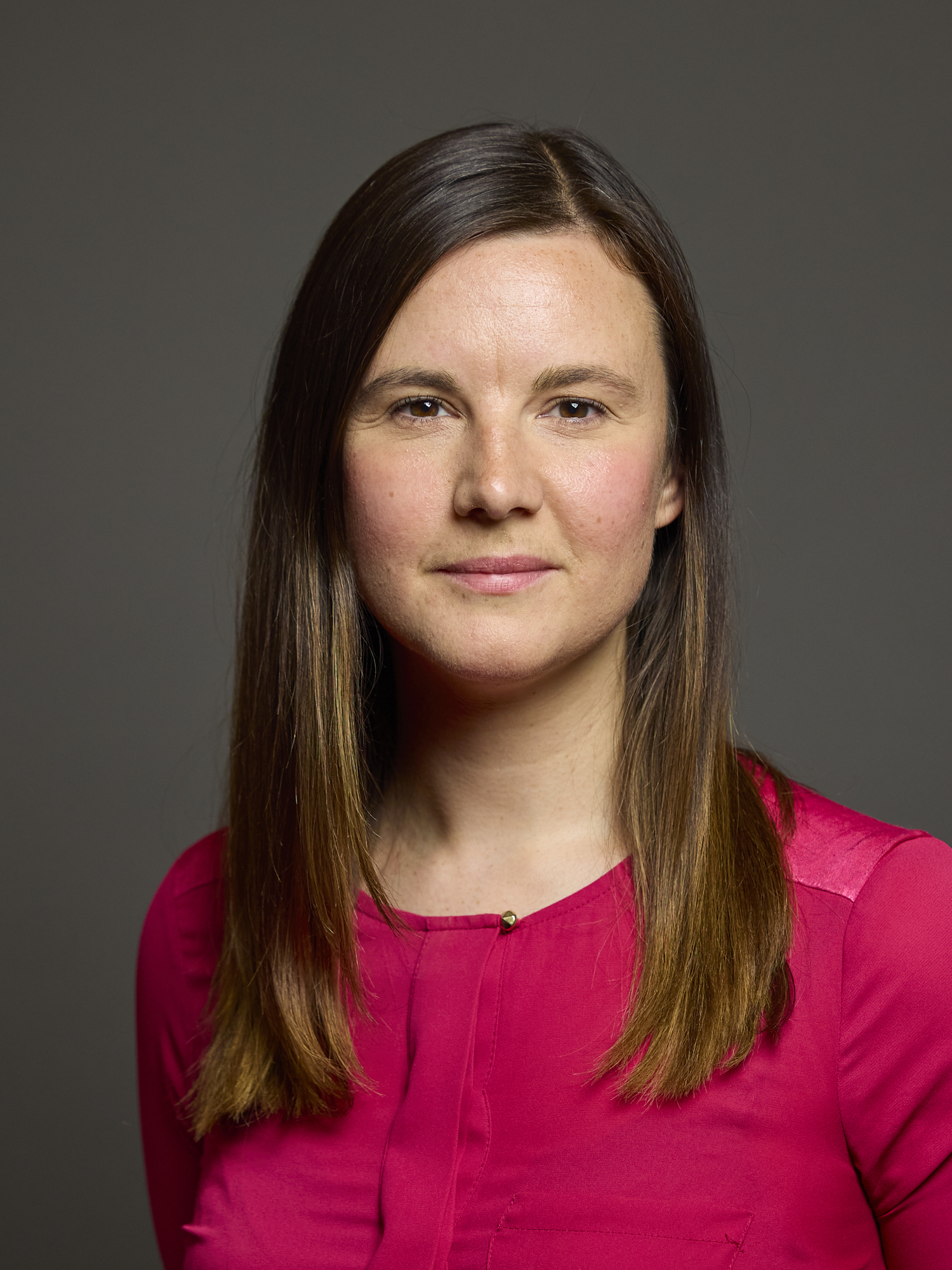
- Official portrait, 2024

Member of Parliament for Ribble Valley
- Incumbent
- Assumed office 4 July 2024
- Preceded by: Nigel Evans
- Majority: 856 (1.6%)

Personal details
- Born: 1987 or 1988 (age 37–38)
- Party: Labour
- Children: 2
- Education: Longridge High School
- Alma mater: Lancaster University, University of Central Lancashire

Maya Anneke Elsie Ellis is a British Labour Party politician who has been the Member of Parliament for Ribble Valley since 2024.

== Early life and career ==
Ellis attended Ribchester Primary School and Longridge High School before graduating in French and English Literature at Lancaster University. Ellis also has an MBA from Lancaster and Masters in Journalism from University of Central Lancashire.

Ellis worked in media in London later moving into local government roles at Salford City Council and as Innovation and Digital Lead in Economic Development Lancashire County Council.

== Political career ==
Ellis is a parish councillor for Ribchester Parish Council.

Ellis was elected as the first Labour MP for the Ribble Valley constituency at the 2024 General Election with a majority of 856 defeating Nigel Evans of the Conservatives who had been MP for 32 years.

== Personal life ==
She lives in Ribchester in her constituency with her husband and two young children.
