= Ribble Valley (constituency) =

UK Parliament constituency (since 1983)

Coordinates: 53.873°N 2.391°W

- County constituency for the House of Commons
- Interactive map of boundaries since 2024
- Location within North West England
- County: Lancashire
- Electorate: 75,993 (March 2020)
- Major settlements: Bamber Bridge, Fulwood, Gisburn, Longridge

Current constituency
- Created: 1983
- Member of Parliament: Maya Ellis (Labour)
- Seats: One
- Created from: Clitheroe, Preston North, Darwen, Skipton and Fylde South

Ribble Valley is a constituency (Note: A county constituency (for the purposes of election expenses and type of returning officer)) in Lancashire represented in the House of Commons of the UK Parliament since 2024 by Maya Ellis of the Labour Party. (Note: As with all constituencies, the constituency elects one Member of Parliament (MP) by the first past the post system of election at least every five years.)

== Constituency profile ==
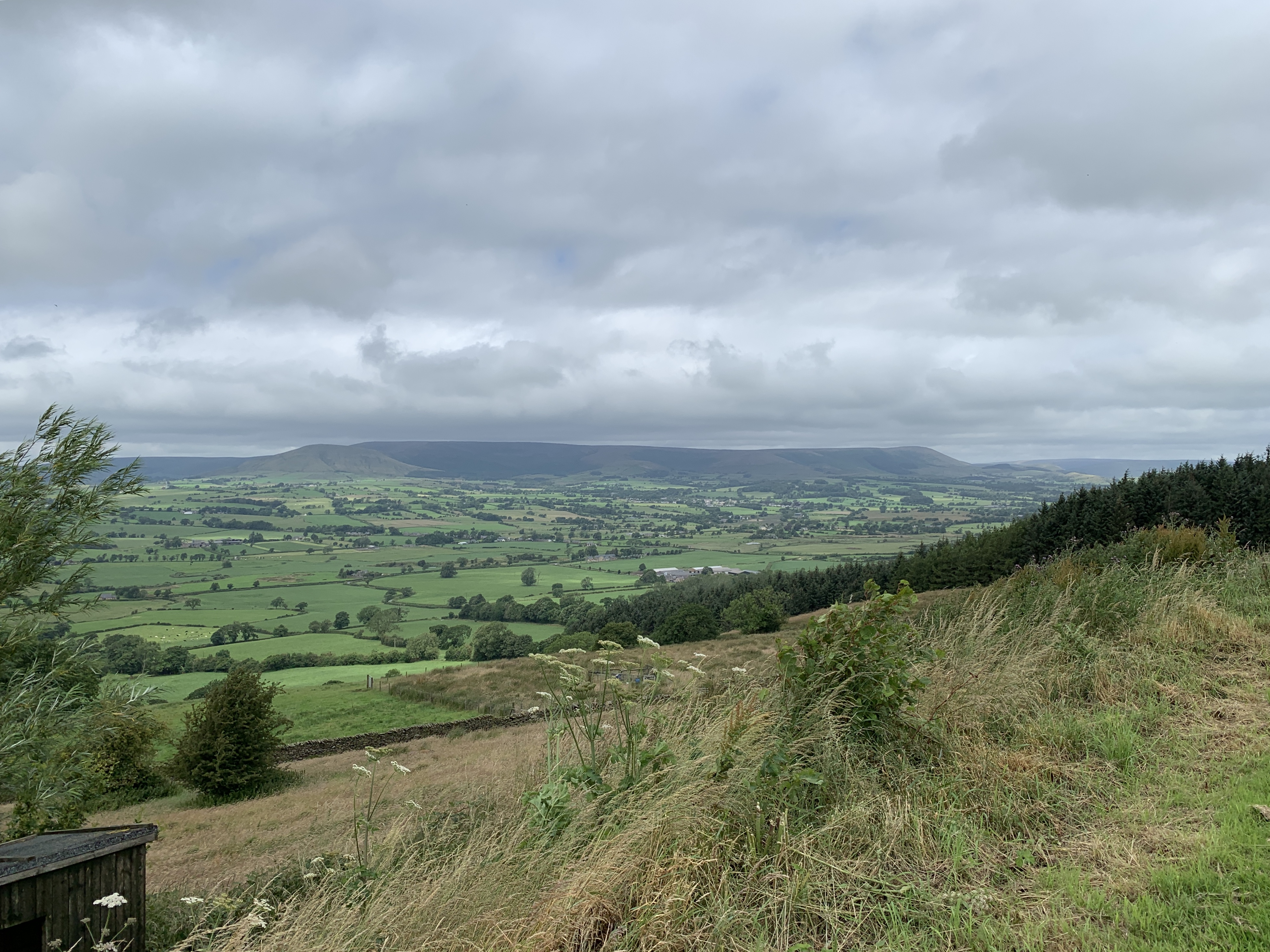
The view from Longridge Fell over Chipping Vale. The hills of Parlick and Fair Snape are visible in the distance

Ribble Valley is a constituency in Lancashire in North West England, covering parts of the Ribble Valley, South Ribble and City of Preston districts. It is named after the River Ribble, which flows through the constituency. Ribble Valley's primary population centre is the area just south of Preston based around the large village of Bamber Bridge, including the connected villages of Lostock Hall and Walton-le-Dale. The constituency also includes some northern Preston suburbs (Fulwood and Cottam) and the rural towns and villages of Longridge, Broughton, Grimsargh and Wilpshire.

Like many Lancashire settlements, the Bamber Bridge area south of Preston has a history of textile manufacturing, especially cotton spinning. The Fulwood residential area north of Preston was mostly developed during the 20th century to accommodate the city's expansion. Today, both areas are largely affluent and suburban in character with mostly detached and semi-detached housing. House prices across the constituency are generally higher than the rest of North West England but lower than the UK average.

The constituency then stretches north-east of Preston to cover a large, sparsely-populated rural area. Most of this region is taken up by the Forest of Bowland, a National Landscape and outlying part of the Pennines consisting of gritstone fells and peat moorland. This area contains many small villages, hamlets and farms. The main rural settlement is the small market town of Longridge, which was traditionally an important centre for quarrying. Like the suburban parts of this constituency, the rural area is also mostly wealthy.

Ribble Valley has a low proportion of young adults and an above-average retired population. Residents have high levels of income and homeownership and the child poverty rate is low. They are generally well-educated and more likely to be religious than the rest of the country; like the rest of Lancashire, there is a large Roman Catholic population here due to historic Irish migration. A high proportion of residents work in the health, manufacturing and agriculture sectors, and the percentage claiming unemployment benefits is around half the UK-wide rate. White people made up 91% of the population at the 2021 census. Asians, mostly of Indian origin, made up 6% of residents but were around a quarter of the population in the Fulwood area.

At the district council level, Longridge and the Bamber Bridge area are mostly represented by Labour Party councillors, Fulwood by Liberal Democrats and the rural areas by Conservatives. At the county council, which held elections in 2025, all seats in the constituency except Fulwood were won by Reform UK. An estimated 55% of voters in Ribble Valley supported leaving the European Union in the 2016 referendum, marginally higher than the UK-wide figure of 52%.

== History ==
The Ribble Valley constituency was created in 1983 almost wholly from the former seat of Clitheroe. Much of the eastern part of the constituency lies within the historic county boundaries of the West Riding of Yorkshire.

Until 2024, with the exception of one year when, following a by-election, it was represented by a Liberal Democrat, the MP had been a Conservative; the lowest majority was 11.6% in 1997. The seat was held by David Waddington from 1983 to 1990. He was previously MP for Clitheroe from 1979 to 1983 and Nelson and Colne from 1968 to 1974. He was Home Secretary from 1989 to 1990. From 1992 to 2024, the MP was Nigel Evans, who twice held the post of Deputy Speaker of the House of Commons.

In 2024, the seat fell to Labour for the first time. Maya Ellis defeated Evans with a majority of 1.6% as a result of a 16.9% swing.

== Boundaries ==
=== Historic ===
1983–1997: The Borough of Ribble Valley, and the Borough of Preston wards of Cadley, Greyfriars, Preston Rural East, and Sharoe Green.

1997–2010: The Borough of Ribble Valley, the City of Preston wards of Cadley, Greyfriars, Preston Rural East, Sharoe Green, and Sherwood, and the Borough of South Ribble wards of All Saints, and Samlesbury and Cuerdale.

2010–2015: The Borough of Ribble Valley, and the ten Borough of South Ribble wards of Bamber Bridge East, Bamber Bridge North, Bamber Bridge West, Coupe Green and Gregson Lane, Farington East, Farington West, Lostock Hall, Samlesbury and Walton, Tardy Gate, and Walton-le-Dale.

In the run up to the 2010 general election, the Boundary Commission's Fifth Periodic Review of Westminster constituencies led Parliament to approve the creation of a new seat of Wyre and Preston North, to which the City of Preston wards, including Fulwood, were transferred. To compensate, the constituency was extended further into the Borough of South Ribble to include the more urban communities of Bamber Bridge and Walton-le-Dale from Preston, and Farington from South Ribble.

2015–2024: The Borough of Ribble Valley, and the nine Borough of South Ribble wards of Bamber Bridge East, Bamber Bridge West, Coupe Green and Gregson Lane, Farington East, Farington West, Lostock Hall, Samlesbury and Walton, Walton-le-Dale East and Walton-le-Dale West.

The Local Government Boundary Commission for England modified the Borough of South Ribble ward boundaries and names in 2015, which altered the contents, but not the boundaries, of the constituency.

=== Current ===
Further to the 2023 review of Westminster constituencies which came into effect for the 2024 United Kingdom general election, the constituency is composed of the following (as they existed on 1 December 2020):

- The City of Preston wards of: Greyfriars; Preston Rural East; Preston Rural North; Sharoe Green.
- The Borough of Ribble Valley wards of: Alston & Hothersall; Billington & Langho; Bowland; Brockhall & Dinckley; Chipping; Clayton-le-Dale & Salesbury; Derby & Thornley; Dilworth; Gisburn & Rimington; Hurst Green & Whitewell; Mellor; Ribchester; Waddington, Bashall Eaves & Mitton; West Bradford & Grindleton; Whalley Nethertown; Wilpshire & Ramsgreave.
- The Borough of South Ribble wards of: Bamber Bridge East; Bamber Bridge West; Coupe Green & Gregson Lane; Lostock Hall; Samlesbury & Walton; Walton-le-Dale East; Walton-le-Dale West.

The seat lost the town of Clitheroe and its environs to the new constituency of Pendle and Clitheroe and regained parts of rural and northern Preston, including the centre of Fulwood, transferred from the abolished constituency of Wyre and Preston North. In the Borough of South Ribble, Farington was returned to the South Ribble seat.

== Members of Parliament ==
Election	Member	Party	Notes
1983	David Waddington	Conservative	Government Chief Whip 1987–1989; Home Secretary 1989–1990; Resigned 1990, on being raised to the peerage
1991 by-election	Michael Carr	Liberal Democrats	Defeated at the 1992 general election
1992	Nigel Evans	Conservative	First Deputy Chairman of Ways and Means (2010–2013); Executive Secretary of the 1922 Committee (2017–2020); Second Deputy Chairman of Ways and Means (2020–2024)
2013	Nigel Evans	Independent	First Deputy Chairman of Ways and Means (2010–2013); Executive Secretary of the 1922 Committee (2017–2020); Second Deputy Chairman of Ways and Means (2020–2024)
2014	Nigel Evans	Conservative	First Deputy Chairman of Ways and Means (2010–2013); Executive Secretary of the 1922 Committee (2017–2020); Second Deputy Chairman of Ways and Means (2020–2024)
2024	Maya Ellis	Labour	

== Elections ==
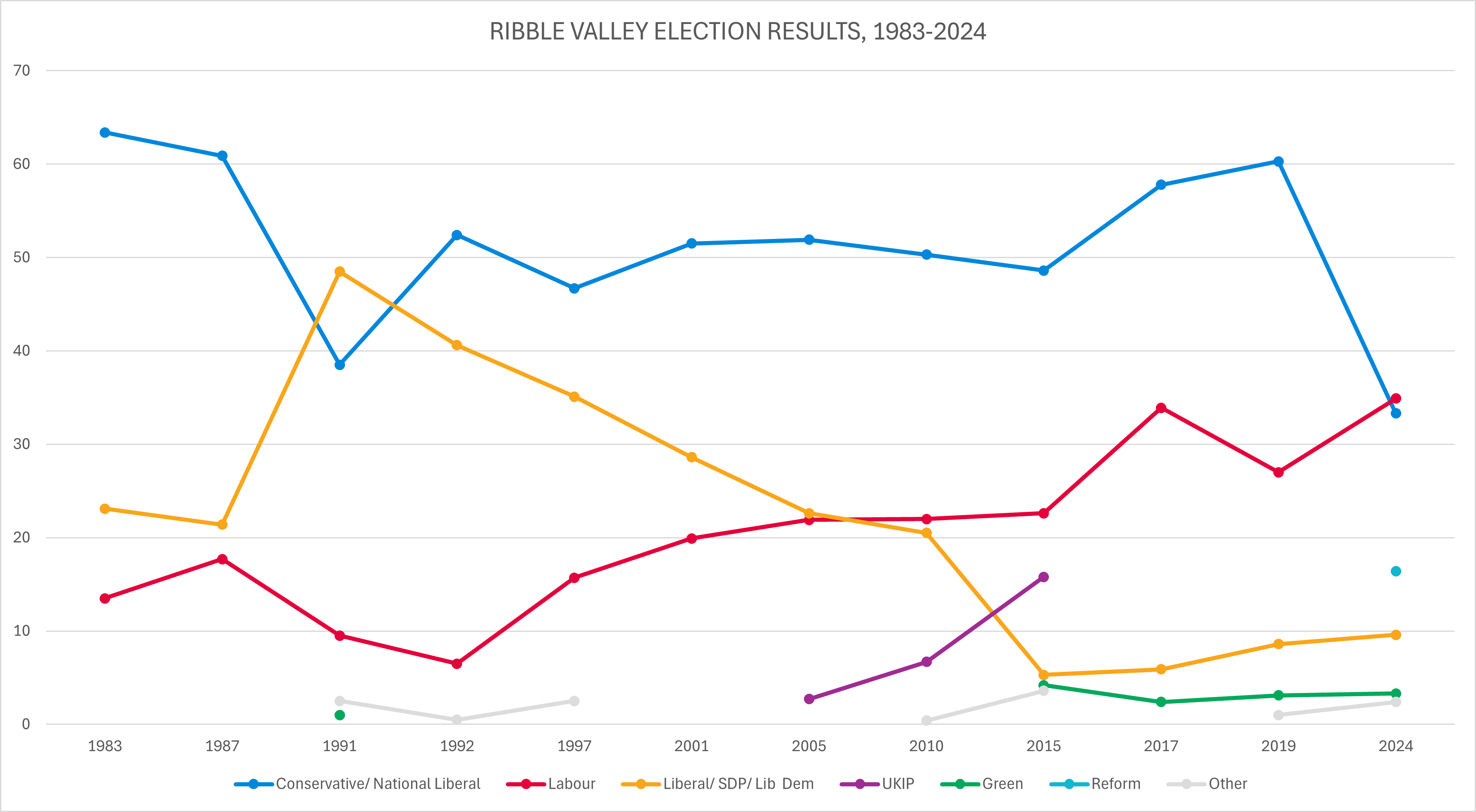
Election results 1983-2024

=== Elections in the 2020s ===
General election 2024: Ribble Valley
Party	Candidate	Votes	%	±%
Labour	Maya Ellis	18,177	34.9	+7.3
Conservative	Nigel Evans	17,321	33.3	−26.5
Reform	John Carroll	8,524	16.4	N/A
Liberal Democrats	John Potter	5,001	9.6	+1.6
Green	Caroline Montague	1,727	3.3	+0.5
Independent	Qasim Ajmi	1,273	2.4	N/A
Majority		856	1.6	N/A
Turnout		52,023	64.6	−4.1
Labour gain from Conservative		Swing	+16.9	

=== Elections in the 2010s ===
General election 2019: Ribble Valley
Party	Candidate	Votes	%	±%
Conservative	Nigel Evans	33,346	60.3	+2.5
Labour	Giles Bridge	14,907	27.0	−6.9
Liberal Democrats	Chantelle Seddon	4,776	8.6	+2.7
Green	Paul Yates	1,704	3.1	+0.7
Independent	Tony Johnson	551	1.0	New
Majority		18,439	33.3	+9.4
Turnout		55,284	69.8	−1.0
Conservative hold		Swing	+4.7	

General election 2017: Ribble Valley
Party	Candidate	Votes	%	±%
Conservative	Nigel Evans	31,919	57.8	+9.2
Labour	David Hinder	18,720	33.9	+11.3
Liberal Democrats	Allan Knox	3,247	5.9	+0.6
Green	Graham Sowter	1,314	2.4	−1.8
Majority		13,199	23.9	−2.1
Turnout		55,363	70.8	+3.7
Conservative hold		Swing	−1.0	

General election 2015: Ribble Valley
Party	Candidate	Votes	%	±%
Conservative	Nigel Evans	25,404	48.6	−1.7
Labour	David Hinder	11,798	22.6	+0.6
UKIP	Shirley Parkinson	8,250	15.8	+9.1
Liberal Democrats	Jackie Pearcey	2,756	5.3	−15.2
Green	Graham Sowter	2,193	4.2	New
Independent	David Brass	1,498	2.9	New
Independent	Grace Astley	288	0.6	New
Independent	Tony Johnson	56	0.1	−0.3
Majority		13,606	26.0	−2.3
Turnout		52,243	67.1	+0.1
Conservative hold		Swing	−1.1	

General election 2010: Ribble Valley
Party	Candidate	Votes	%	±%
Conservative	Nigel Evans	26,298	50.3	+5.4
Labour	Paul Foster	11,529	22.0	+0.1
Liberal Democrats	Allan Knox	10,732	20.5	−2.1
UKIP	Stephen Rush	3,496	6.7	+4.0
Independent	Tony Johnson	232	0.4	New
Majority		14,769	28.3	+13.2
Turnout		52,287	67.0	+5.5
Conservative hold		Swing	+2.6	

=== Elections in the 2000s ===
General election 2005: Ribble Valley
Party	Candidate	Votes	%	±%
Conservative	Nigel Evans	25,834	51.9	+0.4
Liberal Democrats	Julie Young	11,663	22.6	−6.0
Labour	Jack Davenport	10,924	21.9	+2.0
UKIP	Kevin Henry	1,345	2.7	New
Majority		14,171	29.3	+5.4
Turnout		49,776	65.7	−0.5
Conservative hold		Swing	+3.2	

General election 2001: Ribble Valley
Party	Candidate	Votes	%	±%
Conservative	Nigel Evans	25,308	51.5	+4.8
Liberal Democrats	Michael Carr	14,070	28.6	−6.5
Labour	Marcus B. Johnstone	9,793	19.9	+4.2
Majority		11,238	22.9	+11.3
Turnout		49,171	66.2	−12.3
Conservative hold		Swing	+5.7	

=== Elections in the 1990s ===
General election 1997: Ribble Valley
Party	Candidate	Votes	%	±%
Conservative	Nigel Evans	26,702	46.7	−5.9
Liberal Democrats	Michael Carr	20,062	35.1	−3.2
Labour	Marcus B. Johnstone	9,013	15.7	+7.0
Referendum	Julian Parkinson	1,297	2.3	New
Natural Law	Nicola Holmes	147	0.2	+0.0
Majority		6,640	11.6	−0.1
Turnout		57,221	78.5	−6.5
Conservative hold		Swing	−1.3	

General election 1992: Ribble Valley
Party	Candidate	Votes	%	±%
Conservative	Nigel Evans	29,178	52.4	−8.5
Liberal Democrats	Michael Carr	22,636	40.6	+19.2
Labour	Ronald Pickup	3,649	6.5	−11.2
Raving Loony Green Giant	David Beesley	152	0.3	N/A
Natural Law	Nicola Holmes	112	0.2	New
Majority		6,542	11.8	−27.7
Turnout		55,727	85.0	+5.9
Conservative gain from Liberal Democrats		Swing	−13.9	

By election 1991: Ribble Valley
Party	Candidate	Votes	%	±%
Liberal Democrats	Michael Carr	22,377	48.5	+27.1
Conservative	Nigel Evans	17,776	38.5	−22.4
Labour	Josephine Farrington	4,356	9.5	−8.2
Ind. Conservative	David Brass	611	1.3	New
Green	Halldora Ingham	466	1.0	New
Monster Raving Loony	Screaming Lord Sutch	278	0.6	New
Liberal	Simon Taylor	133	0.3	New
Independent – Corrective Party	Lindi St Claire	72	0.2	New
Raving Loony Green Giant Clitheroe Kid	Stuart Hughes	60	0.1	New
Majority		4,601	10.0	N/A
Turnout		46,129	71.1	−8.0
Liberal Democrats gain from Conservative		Swing	+24.7	

=== Elections in the 1980s ===
General election 1987: Ribble Valley
Party	Candidate	Votes	%	±%
Conservative	David Waddington	30,136	60.9	−2.5
SDP	Michael Carr	10,608	21.4	−1.7
Labour	Greg Pope	8,781	17.7	+4.2
Majority		19,528	39.5	−0.8
Turnout		49,525	79.1	+2.3
Conservative hold		Swing	−0.4	

General election 1983: Ribble Valley
Party	Candidate	Votes	%	±%
Conservative	David Waddington	29,223	63.4	
SDP	Michael Carr	10,632	23.1	
Labour	Edward Saville	6,214	13.5	
Majority		18,591	40.3	
Turnout		46,060	76.8	
Conservative win (new seat)				

== See also ==
- List of parliamentary constituencies in Lancashire
