= Benjamin Mancroft, 3rd Baron Mancroft =

British politician and businessman (born 1957)

The Right Honourable The Lord Mancroft
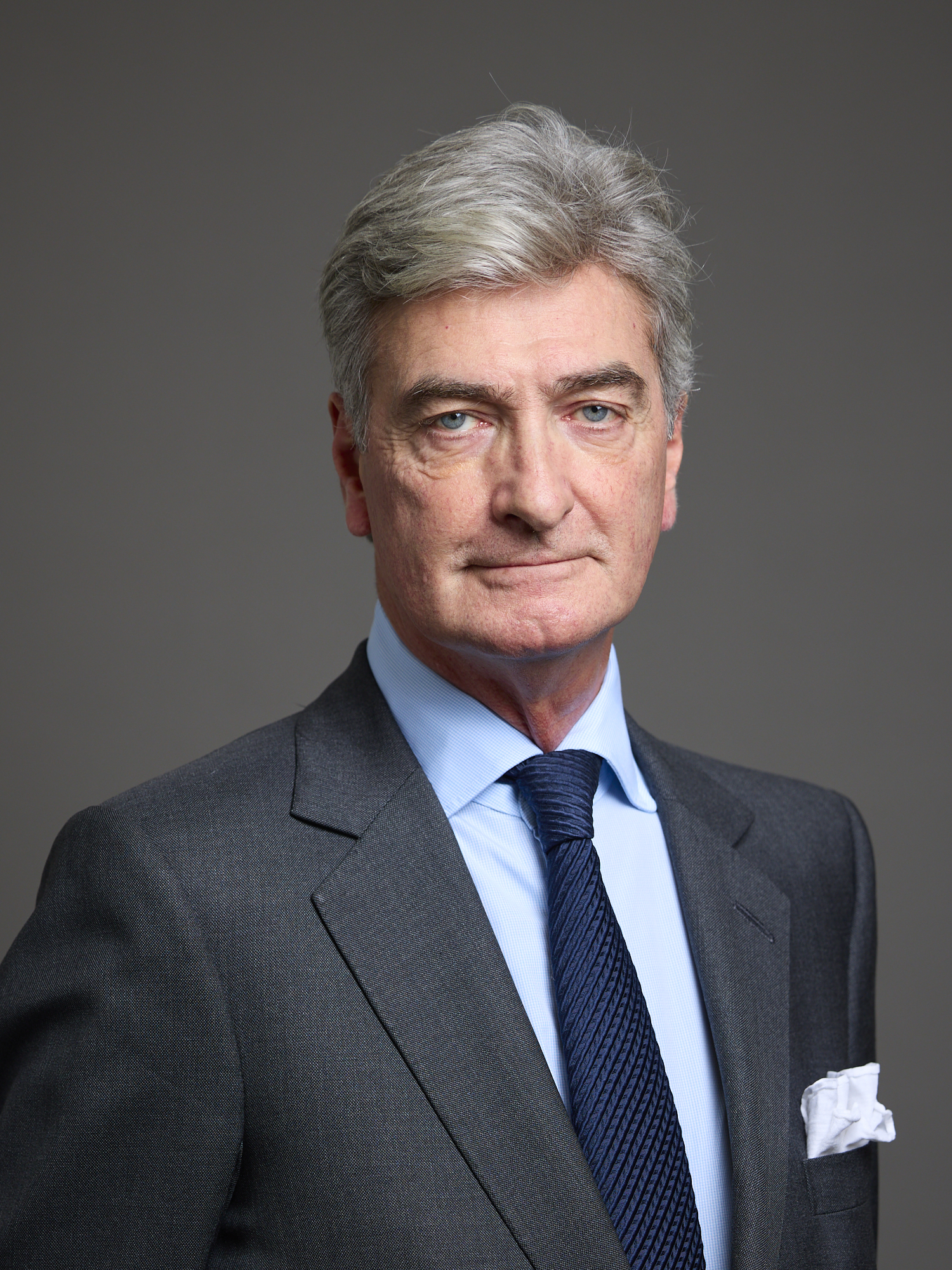
- Official portrait, 2024

Member of the House of Lords
- Lord Temporal
- Hereditary peerage 23 February 1988 – 11 November 1999
- Preceded by: The 2nd Baron Mancroft
- Succeeded by: Seat abolished
- Elected Hereditary Peer; 11 November 1999 – 29 April 2026
- Election: 1999
- Preceded by: Seat established
- Succeeded by: Seat abolished

Personal details
- Born: 16 May 1957 (age 69)
- Party: Conservative
- Education: Eton College

Benjamin Lloyd Stormont Mancroft, 3rd Baron Mancroft (born 16 May 1957), is a British peer, businessman and Conservative Party politician.

== Early life ==
Mancroft was born on 16 May 1957. He is the son of the 2nd Baron Mancroft and Diana Lloyd. He was educated at Eton College, an all-boys public school in Berkshire.

== Political career ==
In 1987 he succeeded to his father's titles and became the 3rd Baron Mancroft. He entered the House of Lords on 23 February 1988 and sits as a Conservative. In 1999 he was one of the ninety hereditary peers elected to remain in the House of Lords after the House of Lords Act 1999.

== Personal life ==
Lord Mancroft has been married to Emma Peart, daughter of Thomas Peart and his wife Gabriel, since 20 September 1990; they have one daughter and two sons:

- The Hon. Georgia Esmé Mancroft (born 25 April 1993)
- The Hon. Arthur Louis Stormont Mancroft (born 3 May 1995)
- The Hon. Maximilian Michael Mancroft (born 3 August 1998)

== Arms ==
Coat of arms of Benjamin Mancroft, 3rd Baron Mancroft
Crest In front of a representation of Norwich Castle with three cupolas issuant from each a staff Proper flying therefrom a banner Argent charged with a cross Gules a sword sheathed Gules garnished Or pommelled and hilted Or and a mace Gold in saltire (i.e. a representation of the ancient Crystal Mace and the Sword in the Regalia of the Corporation of the City of Norwich). Escutcheon Gules a chevron chequy Argent and Sable between in chief two portcullises chained Or and in base a representation of Farnham Castle triple towered Or on a chief Or a lion passant guardant Sable. Supporters On either side a whiffler of the Corporation of the City of Norwich Proper. Motto COURAGE, PATIENCE

== Controversies ==
=== NHS nurses controversy ===
In February 2008, Mancroft claimed that NHS nurses who had treated him at the Royal United Hospital in Bath were "grubby, drunken and promiscuous". The hospital's Chief Executive, James Scott, called the accusations "damaging and distressing", and requested that the peer retract them. Mancroft met him but refused to apologise.

=== Hunting controversy ===
In November 2020, Mancroft was involved in an online zoom webinar conspiring to actively flout the 2004 ban on hunting with hounds. At the end of the first seminar, Mancroft advises the audience: “Please take that on board everybody. Anything that comes out of these meetings is to be kept amongst ourselves it’s not for general coverage”. Mancroft was not charged; however, other co-conspirators were charged with “encouraging or assisting others to commit offences under the Hunting Act” following an investigation by the Devon and Cornwall Police.

== Notes ==
Peerage of the United Kingdom
Preceded by Stormont Mancroft	Baron Mancroft; 1987–present Member of the House of Lords (1988–1999)	Incumbent; Heir apparent: Hon. Arthur Mancroft
Parliament of the United Kingdom
New office created by the House of Lords Act 1999	Elected hereditary peer to the House of Lords under the House of Lords Act 1999; 1999–2026	Office abolished under the House of Lords (Hereditary Peers) Act 2026
