= Sydney Silverman =

British Labour politician (1895–1968)

Member of Parliament for Nelson and Colne
- In office 14 November 1935 – 9 February 1968
- Preceded by: Linton Thorp
- Succeeded by: David Waddington

Personal details
- Born: 8 October 1895 England, United Kingdom of Great Britain and Ireland
- Died: 9 February 1968 (aged 72) London, England, United Kingdom
- Party: Labour

Samuel Sydney Silverman (8 October 1895 – 9 February 1968) was a British Labour politician and vocal opponent of capital punishment.

== Early life ==
Silverman was born in poverty to migrant Jewish parents from Jassy, Romania. His father was a draper living in the Kensington Fields area of Liverpool.

Silverman attended Liverpool Institute and the University of Liverpool, thanks to scholarships. During the First World War he was a conscientious objector to military service and served three prison sentences, in Preston, Wormwood Scrubs and Belfast prisons.

== Career ==
Silverman was a lecturer in English at the National University of Finland from 1921 to 1925, and then returned to the University of Liverpool to teach and read law. After qualifying as a solicitor, he worked on workmen's compensation claims and landlord–tenant disputes.

From 1932 to 1938, Silverman served on Liverpool City Council. He contested Liverpool Exchange without success at a by-election in 1933, but was elected as Member of Parliament (MP) for Nelson and Colne in the general election in 1935.

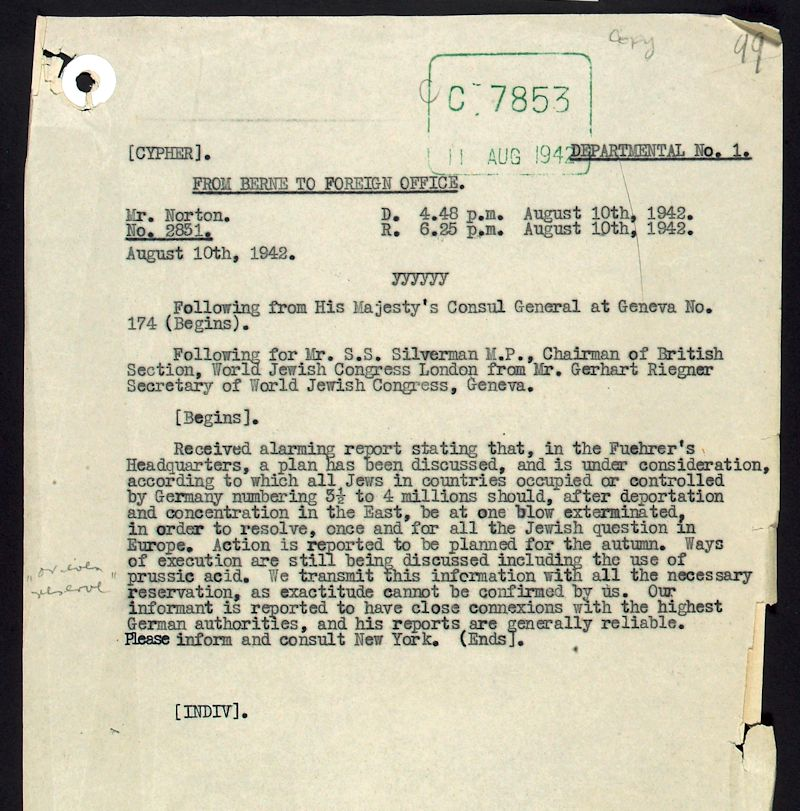
The Riegner Telegram, addressed to Sydney Silverman in August 1942, was one of the first pieces of evidence of the implementation of the Final Solution by the Nazis.

Silverman was prominent in his support for Jews worldwide and for their rights in Palestine. He rethought his pacifism in light of the reports of antisemitism in Europe, and reluctantly supported Britain's entry into the Second World War. He was vocal in asking from the government (and Churchill in particular) for a statement of war aims, which had become a contentious issue in the early years of the war. Silverman was prominent within the debates over the potential repatriation of Jewish refugees, telling Churchill "that it would be difficult to conceive of a more cruel procedure than to take people who have lost everything they have – their homes, their relatives, their children, all the things that make life decent and possible – and compel them against their will, to go back to the scene of those crimes".

Silverman was an ardent Zionist who criticized the anti-Zionist policies of Ernest Bevin. According to John Newsinger, he played down the Nakba, saying that the Israelis "did their utmost to persuade them [Palestinian Arabs] to stay."

Silverman was widely expected to join the government after the Labour victory in the general election in 1945, but, as he came from and stood prominently for the left of the Labour Party, he was not appointed by Clement Attlee. He became opposed to the government's foreign policy. He refused to support German rearmament in 1954 and had the Labour Party Whip withdrawn from November 1954 to April 1955. He was one of the founders of the Campaign for Nuclear Disarmament. In 1961, as a protest against bipartisan support for British nuclear weapons, he voted against the Royal Air Force, Royal Navy and British Army estimates in the House of Commons, and was suspended from the Labour Party Whip from March 1961 until May 1963.

Silverman died on 9 February 1968 following a stroke.

== Opponent of capital punishment ==
A fervent opponent of the death penalty, Silverman founded the National Campaign for the Abolition of Capital Punishment. In 1948 an amendment debated in the House of Commons proposing abolition of capital punishment passed but it was defeated in the House of Lords. He wrote about several miscarriages of justice in the 1940s and 1950s, such as the hanging of Timothy Evans when it later emerged that serial killer John Christie had murdered Evans's wife and had given perjured evidence at Evans's trial in 1949. Silverman proposed a private member's bill on abolition of the death penalty, which was passed by 200 votes to 98 on a free vote in the House of Commons on 28 June 1956; but was defeated in the House of Lords.

In 1965, he successfully piloted the Murder (Abolition of Death Penalty) Bill through Parliament, abolishing capital punishment for murder in the UK and in the British Armed Forces for a period of five years but with provision for abolition to be made permanent by affirmative resolutions of both Houses of Parliament before the end of that period. The appropriate resolutions were passed in 1969. Silverman was opposed at the 1966 general election in the Nelson and Colne constituency by Patrick Downey, the uncle of Lesley Anne Downey, a victim in the Moors murders case, who stood on an explicitly pro-hanging platform. Downey polled over 5,000 votes, 13.7%, then the largest vote for a genuinely independent candidate since 1945.

== Notes ==
Parliament of the United Kingdom
Preceded by Linton Thorp	Member of Parliament for Nelson and Colne; 1935–1968	Succeeded by David Waddington
