= 1937 Farnham by-election =

UK Parliamentary by-election

The 1937 Farnham by-election was held on 23 March 1937. The by-election was held due to the elevation to the peerage of the incumbent Conservative MP, Arthur Samuel. It was won by the Conservative candidate Godfrey Nicholson.

Peter Pain, a recently qualified barrister, contested the election for the Labour Party. Earlier in the decade, he had visited a Hitler Youth camp, and this experience convinced him that a war was inevitable, and that he should oppose Nazism by becoming a socialist.

Linton Thorp, who contested the election as an independent conservative, was a former Conservative MP who had left the party believing that some of its policies were too close to socialism. He stood with the support of the pro-Nazi Liberty Restoration League.

The election was won by the Conservative candidate Godfrey Nicholson.

Farnham by-election, 1937
Party	Candidate	Votes	%	±%
Conservative	Godfrey Nicholson	20,580	66.7	−11.8
Labour	Peter Pain	7,792	25.3	+3.8
Ind. Conservative	Linton Thorp	2,327	7.5	New
Independent	Edward Miller	154	0.5	New
Majority		12,788	41.4	−15.6
Turnout		30,853		
Conservative hold		Swing		
