= Arthur Samuel, 1st Baron Mancroft =

British politician (1872–1942)

The Right Honourable The Lord Mancroft

Chairman of the Public Accounts Committee
- In office 1929–1931
- Preceded by: William Graham
- Succeeded by: Morgan Jones

Financial Secretary to the Treasury
- In office 1 November 1927 – 5 June 1929
- Prime Minister: Stanley Baldwin
- Preceded by: Ronald McNeill
- Succeeded by: Frederick Pethick-Lawrence

Secretary for Overseas Trade
- In office 4 November 1924 – 1 November 1927
- Prime Minister: Stanley Baldwin
- Preceded by: William Lunn
- Succeeded by: Douglas Hacking

Member of the House of Lords Lord Temporal
- In office 23 December 1937 – 17 August 1942; Hereditary peerage
- Preceded by: Peerage created
- Succeeded by: The 2nd Baron Mancroft

Member of Parliament for Farnham
- In office 14 December 1918 – 23 March 1937
- Preceded by: Constituency created
- Succeeded by: Godfrey Nicholson

Personal details
- Born: Arthur Michael Samuel; 6 December 1872 Norwich, England
- Died: 17 August 1942 (aged 69) Uckfield, England
- Party: Conservative
- Spouse: Phoebe Fletcher (m. 1912)
- Education: Norwich School

Arthur Michael Samuel, 1st Baron Mancroft (6 December 1872 – 17 August 1942) was a British Conservative politician.

== Background ==
Born in Norwich, Lord Mancroft was the eldest son of Benjamin Samuel, of Norwich (19 April 1840 – 16 April 1890), and Rosetta Haldinstein (died 29 April 1907, daughter of Philip Haldinstein and wife Rachel Soman), and grandson of Michael Samuel (1799–1857), all of them were Ashkenazi Jews.

== Early life ==
He was educated at Norwich School. He was Lord Mayor of Norwich from 1912 to 1913. He was the first Jewish Lord Mayor of Norwich and was made an Honorary Freeman of the City of Norwich in 1928.

== Member of Parliament ==
in the two General elections of 1910 he stood for the Conservatives in the Stretford division of Lancashire, near Manchester, but was unsuccessful on both occasions. In 1918 he was elected as member of parliament (MP) for Farnham, a seat he would hold until 1937, and served under Stanley Baldwin as Secretary for Overseas Trade from 1924 to 1927 and as Financial Secretary to the Treasury from 1927 to 1929. He was also chairman of the Public Accounts Committee of the House of Commons in 1930 and 1931. Samuel was created a Baronet, of Mancroft, in the City of Norwich in the County of Norfolk, on 15 January 1932, and on 23 December 1937, he was raised to the peerage as Baron Mancroft, of Mancroft (referring to the area around St Peter Mancroft church) in the City of Norwich.

== Family ==
Lord Mancroft married Phoebe Fletcher, daughter of George Alfred Chune Fletcher and wife, in 1912. He died in Uckfield on 17 August 1942, aged 69, and was succeeded in the baronetcy and the barony by his son Stormont Mancroft, 2nd Baron Mancroft. He was also to become a Conservative government minister.

The papers of Lord Mancroft are in the Churchill Archives Centre, Churchill College, Cambridge.

== Author ==
He published: "Life of Giovanni Battista Piranesi"; "The Working of the Bill of Exchange with an Explanation of the Overseas Trade Balance"; "The Herring: its Effect on the History of Britain"; and "The Mancroft Essays".

== Arms ==
Coat of arms of Arthur Samuel, 1st Baron Mancroft
Crest In front of a representation of Norwich Castle with three cupolas issuant from each a staff Proper flying therefrom a banner Argent charged with a cross Gules a sword sheathed Gules garnished Or pommelled and hilted Or and a mace Gold in saltire (i.e. a representation of the ancient Crystal Mace and the Sword in the Regalia of the Corporation of the City of Norwich). Escutcheon Gules a chevron chequy Argent and Sable between in chief two portcullises chained Or and in base a representation of Farnham Castle triple towered Or on a chief Or a lion passant guardant Sable. Supporters On either side a whiffler of the Corporation of the City of Norwich Proper. Motto COURAGE, PATIENCE

== Sources ==
- Kidd, Charles; Williamson, David, eds. (1990). Debrett's Peerage and Baronetage (1990 ed.). New York: St Martin's Press.

Parliament of the United Kingdom
New constituency	Member of Parliament for Farnham; 1918–1937	Succeeded by Godfrey Nicholson
Political offices
Preceded by William Lunn	Secretary for Overseas Trade; 1924–1927	Succeeded by Douglas Hacking
Preceded by Ronald McNeill	Financial Secretary to the Treasury; 1927–1929	Succeeded by Frederick Pethick-Lawrence
Peerage of the United Kingdom
New creation	Baron Mancroft; 1937–1942	Succeeded by Stormont Mancroft
Baronetage of the United Kingdom
New creation	Baronet (of Mancroft); 1932–1942	Succeeded by Stormont Mancroft
