= Michael Carr (Liberal Democrat politician) =

British politician (born 1946)

Member of Parliament for Ribble Valley
- In office 7 March 1991 – 16 March 1992
- Preceded by: David Waddington
- Succeeded by: Nigel Evans

Personal details
- Born: 31 January 1946 (age 80) Preston, Lancashire
- Party: Liberal Democrats
- Education: St. Mary's Catholic College (Blackpool)

Michael Carr (born 31 January 1946) is a British teacher, lecturer, and politician for the Liberal Democrats. Originally a teacher, Carr became active in politics as a Conservative councillor before joining the Social Democratic Party. After two unsuccessful general election candidacies, Carr won a sensational by-election victory in 1991 to become the Member of Parliament (MP) for Ribble Valley. His victory was short-lived as he lost the seat in the general election that followed a year later, and he twice failed to regain it.

== Early life ==
Carr was born in Preston, and grew up in the Ribble Valley village of Sabden. He was educated at St Josephs College, Blackpool, and Preston Catholic College. After a year as an engineering apprentice, Carr became a local government administrative officer in 1964. He left this job four years later to work as a partner in the family newsagents.

== Career ==
In 1970, Carr decided on a change of career and embarked on a course at the Margaret McMillan Memorial College of Education in Bradford from where he obtained a Certificate in Education. Later he obtained a Diploma in Special Educational Needs at the Bradford and Ilkley Community College. His first teaching jobs were as a geography teacher at Brookside secondary school and Stainsby School in Middlesbrough, and in 1975 he was appointed head of geography at St Thomas Aquinas Roman Catholic High School in Darwen, Lancashire. He moved in 1982 to be head of general studies at Blackthorn County Secondary School in Bacup where he remained for five years. He joined the Lancashire County Council School Support Team dealing with disruptive behaviour in 1988.

Carr joined the National Association of Schoolmasters/Union of Women Teachers in 1975, and served as Rossendale district NAS/UWT secretary from 1984 to 1987. He was press officer for the Lancashire federation of the NAS/UWT from 1984 to 1987 and from 1988 to 1990.

Brought up a Roman Catholic, Carr later converted to Anglicanism. He married, but after the birth of his son his wife died of cancer in 1979. Carr remarried in 1980 and had four sons and three daughters with his second wife who was the daughter of a farmer from East Anglia.

== Politics ==
Initially a member of the Conservative Party, Carr was a member of Sabden Parish Council from 1976 to 1978, and from 1979 to 1983. He was elected, unopposed, as a Conservative representing Sabden on Ribble Valley borough council in 1979. He left the Conservatives and joined the Social Democratic Party when the party was founded in 1981, motivated mainly by the Conservative council's lack of interest in providing cheap rural housing. He did not stand for re-election as a councillor in 1983. Carr was SDP candidate for Ribble Valley at the 1983 general election, polling 23% of the vote to take second place. He fought the seat again in 1987, with his share of the vote falling slightly to 21.4%. After the election Carr supported the merger of the SDP with the Liberal Party, and he joined the Liberal Democrats on their formation.

== By-election ==
When John Major formed his government in November 1990, he appointed the sitting MP for Ribble Valley David Waddington as Leader of the House of Lords. This action vacated his seat and brought about a by-election for a new MP which was held in early 1991. Carr was selected as Liberal Democrat candidate, and benefited from a campaign run by the same team which had won the Eastbourne by-election four months before. Carr highlighted his local roots in contrast with the Conservative candidate who came from Swansea; one Liberal Democrat leaflet contained 26 mentions of the fact that Carr was local.

During the by-election Carr said that he found that the issue which most animated voters was the Community Charge or Poll Tax, which the Major government was reviewing with a view to replacing but which was still being levied. He admitted that under the alternative local income tax system favoured by his party, a rate of 5.6% would be needed for Ribble Valley, meaning a bill of £550-£600 for each taxpayer which was significantly more than the Community Charge level.

== Member of Parliament ==
With a majority of 4,601, Carr won the by-election and declared in his victory speech that "If ever there was any doubt of the issue that was going to settle this by-election there is no doubt now. When the poll tax is finally put to rest in the grave, its epitaph will read 'Here lies the poll tax, killed in Ribble Valley'." When he took his seat on 12 March, Labour MP Dennis Skinner heckled "Don't take your coat off, you'll not be stopping!". It was reported at the end of April that the local Liberal Democrats had asked to rent a venue for Carr to hold his constituency surgeries for no more than six months, rather than the three years offered.

Admitting he was breaking with tradition, Carr made his maiden speech the day after taking his seat because there was a Labour-initiated debate on abolition of the Poll Tax. He reported some of the conversations he had had on the campaign trail, and then outlined the case for a local income tax. He used his professional knowledge to speak on teachers' pay, which was being reformed at the time he entered Parliament; in June 1991 he welcomed the appointment of an independent body to decide pay levels, explaining that morale in the profession was low because of previous government decisions.

Before arriving in Westminster to take his seat, Carr had made contact with Conservative MP Ken Hargreaves, who represented a neighbouring constituency and who was an organiser of the anti-abortion campaign in Parliament, to offer his help. In December 1991 he presented a petition from Roman Catholic churches in his constituency opposing the use of abortifacient drug RU486. He was called at Prime Minister's Questions on 4 February 1992, and asked about a constituent who was told to wait 14 months for a hip replacement but offered the chance to pay to have the operation done privately without delay.

== Defeat ==
Carr faced a tough fight to retain his seat at the 1992 general election. He told the press that he saw no sign of movement away from him, commenting that local small businesses were still "clobbered by the uniform business rate and by a deep recession made worse by government policies". On polling day, Carr was defeated by Nigel Evans, who beat him by 6,542 votes. After his defeat he went back to teaching but was initially only able to find positions as a supply teacher. He fought the Ribble Valley seat at the 1997 election and was defeated again. After the election Carr (who was in the process of divorcing) said that he would now put his political ambitions on hold and spend more time looking after his children. Carr was persuaded to return and was a candidate there in the 2001 election, coming second again.

== Rossendale politics ==
Carr continued to work in Education in local schools as a behaviour support consultant. In January 2004 he was selected as Liberal Democrat candidate for Rossendale and Darwen constituency. He stood for Rossendale Borough Council in Greensclough ward in the 2004 local election, losing by 40 votes. He was selected to fight a council by-election in Longholme ward in autumn 2004 but his nomination papers were not submitted in time. Living in Weir, he called on Rossendale Borough Council to fence off a "deathtrap" building site where local children had been seen playing. At the 2005 general election he came third with 6,670 votes.

In autumn 2005, Carr was Liberal Democrat candidate in a Rossendale council by-election in Hareholme ward, coming in third place as Labour gained the seat from the Conservatives. A further attempt to win Greensclough ward in the 2006 local elections produced a greater defeat, and when he fought in 2007 he finished in third place with 23% of the vote. He was bottom of the poll in the 2008 contest in the ward. Since 2006 Carr has been helping Bacup Borough Football Club as a part-time promotions manager. In August 2010, Carr wrote to the local newspaper, noting that "I am seldom tempted these days to air my views via letters to papers". He criticised hypocrisy and tribalism in the Labour Party.

Since 2008 Carr has been Chairman of Mashed Youth Project; an organisation which was started in Greater Manchester by two youth workers who approached him for support. Since then the organisation has been registered as a charity in Scotland since 2010 and has recently been registered as a charity in England and Wales. Mashed Youth Project is currently offering a range of educational opportunities to 14- to 19-year-olds in various Highland Region communities including Fort William, Kinlochleven, Ullapool, Thurso and Balintore.

Parliament of the United Kingdom
Preceded by David Waddington	Member of Parliament for Ribble Valley; 1991–1992	Succeeded by Nigel Evans
