= Godfrey Nicholson =

British politician (1901–1991)

The Right Honourable Sir Godfrey Nicholson, Bt

Member of Parliament for Farnham
- In office 1937–1966
- Preceded by: Sir Arthur Samuel
- Succeeded by: Maurice Macmillan

Member of Parliament for Morpeth
- In office 1931–1935
- Preceded by: Ebby Edwards
- Succeeded by: Robert Taylor

Personal details
- Born: 9 December 1901
- Died: 14 July 1991 (aged 89)
- Party: Conservative
- Spouse: Lady Katharine Lindsay (m. 1936; died 1972)
- Relations: William Nicholson (grandfather); William Graham Nicholson (uncle); John Sanctuary Nicholson (uncle)
- Children: 4, including Emma Harriet Nicholson
- Parent(s): Richard Francis Harrison; Helen Violet Portal
- Education: Winchester College; Christ Church, Oxford

Sir Godfrey Nicholson, 1st Baronet (9 December 1901 – 14 July 1991) was a British Conservative Party Member of Parliament (MP).

== Early life ==
Nicholson was born on 9 December 1901. he was a younger son of Richard Francis Harrison (1865–1940) and Helen Violet (née Portal) Nicholson (1867–1927). Through his father, he was a member of the family which founded London-based gin distillers J&W Nicholson & Co.

His paternal grandparents were William Nicholson and the former Isabella Sarah Meek. Among his paternal family were uncles, William Graham Nicholson and John Sanctuary Nicholson. His maternal grandparents were Helen Mary Charlotte (née Soulsby) Portal and Rev. George Raymond Portal (a brother of Sir Wyndham Portal, 1st Baronet), the President of the Oxford Union who served as rector of Albury, Surrey and of Burghclere.

He was educated at Winchester College and graduated from Christ Church, Oxford, in 1925.

== Career ==
In 1931, he contested and won Morpeth and held the seat until 1935. Two years later, he contested and won Farnham in a by-election and on the outbreak of World War II in 1939, he served with The Royal Fusiliers until 1942. He was subsequently a captain in the Home Guard and as MP criticized that an issue of pikes to the Home Guard made during a shortage of rifles "if not meant as a joke, was an insult".

On 20 March 1958, Nicholson was made a baronet and retired from politics in 1966.

== Personal life ==
On 30 June 1936, he had married Lady Katharine Lindsay (1912–1972), a younger daughter of David Lindsay, 27th Earl of Crawford, and the former Constance Lilian Pelly (a daughter of Sir Henry Pelly, 3rd Baronet). Together, they had four daughters:

- Rose Helen Nicholson (b. 1937), who married Richard Luce, Baron Luce, a son of Margaret (née Napier) and Sir William Luce.
- Laura Violet Nicholson (1939–2021), who married Sir John Montgomery-Cuninghame, 12th Baronet, the youngest son of Sir Thomas Montgomery-Cuninghame, 10th Baronet and, his second wife, Nancy Macaulay Foggo, in 1964.
- Emma Harriet Nicholson (b. 1941), who married Sir Michael Harris Caine, in 1987.
- Harriet Mary Nicholson (b. 1946), who married Charles Hugh Flower (a maternal great-great-grandson of the 1st Duke of Abercorn).

Sir Godfrey was a favourite at the London Gliding Club where they appreciated his passing of favourable laws regarding gliding.

As Nicholson had no sons from his marriage, his title became extinct upon his death in 1991.

== Arms ==
Coat of arms of Godfrey Nicholson
| Crest Out of an antique crown Gules a lion's head Ermine gorged with a collar gemel Azure. Escutcheon Per pale Azure and Gules two bars gemel Ermine in chief three suns in splendour Or. Motto Sol Et Scutum Deus |

Parliament of the United Kingdom
| Preceded by Ebby Edwards | Member of Parliament for Morpeth; 1931–1935 | Succeeded by Robert Taylor |
| Preceded by Sir Arthur Samuel | Member of Parliament for Farnham; 1937–1966 | Succeeded by Maurice Macmillan |
Baronetage of the United Kingdom
| New creation | Baronet (of Winterbourne); 1958–1991 | Extinct |
