= Anne Corner =

British political activist and writer

Anne Elizabeth Corner (1886 – 15 November 1930) was a British political activist and writer.

Born in Plymouth as Anne Squire, she was the sister of writer J. C. Squire. She studied singing in London and Paris, and had a short career as a professional singer. She also joined the Women's Freedom League, in support of women's suffrage. During World War I, she worked for the Food Ministry, and also sang to raise money for charity.

She joined the Fabian Society in 1914, and was chair of the Fabian Women's Group in 1922. She also served on the executive of the Fabian Nursery Committee, and the Labour Party Standing Joint Committee of Women's Industrial Organisations. She served on the executive of the Fabian Society from 1923.

Corner stood unsuccessfully for the Labour Party in Farnham at the 1923 and 1924 United Kingdom general elections.

During the late 1920s, Corner lived in Milford, Surrey, where she worked as a lecturer and occasional actor, producing community theatre in her spare time. She was also active in the League of Nations Union, and wrote short stories. She died in November 1930, following an operation.
