= Stormont Mancroft, 2nd Baron Mancroft =

British politician (1914–1987)

The Right Honourable The Lord Mancroft KBE TD
- Lord Mancroft in 1963

Minister without Portfolio
- In office 11 June 1957 – 23 October 1958
- Prime Minister: Harold Macmillan
- Preceded by: The Earl of Munster
- Succeeded by: The Earl of Dundee

Parliamentary Secretary to the Minister of Defence
- In office 10 January 1957 – 11 June 1957
- Prime Minister: Harold Macmillan
- Preceded by: The Earl of Gosford
- Succeeded by: Office vacant

Parliamentary Under-Secretary of State for Home Affairs
- In office 18 October 1954 – 9 January 1957
- Prime Minister: Winston Churchill; Anthony Eden
- Preceded by: The Lord Lloyd
- Succeeded by: Patricia Hornsby-Smith

Lord-in-waiting Government Whip
- In office 15 December 1952 – 18 October 1954
- Prime Minister: Winston Churchill
- Preceded by: The Lord Lloyd
- Succeeded by: The Lord Fairfax of Cameron

Member of the House of Lords Lord Temporal
- In office 15 August 1942 – 14 September 1987; Hereditary peerage
- Preceded by: The 1st Baron Mancroft
- Succeeded by: The 3rd Baron Mancroft

Personal details
- Born: 27 July 1914
- Died: 14 September 1987 (aged 73)
- Party: Conservative

Stormont Mancroft Samuel Mancroft, 2nd Baron Mancroft KBE TD (27 July 1914 – 14 September 1987), born Stormont Mancroft Samuel, was a British Conservative politician.

== Early life ==
Mancroft was the son of Arthur Samuel, 1st Baron Mancroft, and Phoebe Fletcher. In 1925 he assumed by deed poll the surname "Mancroft". He was educated at Winchester College, Kingsgate House (K), Christ Church, Oxford, obtaining a law degree, and Bonn University, where he studied music. In 1938 he became a barrister at the Inner Temple. He served in the Second World War as a Lieutenant-Colonel in the British Army, was twice Mentioned in Despatches and awarded the Croix de Guerre.

== Political career ==
After the war, he served in the Conservative administrations of Winston Churchill and Anthony Eden as a government whip from 1952 to 1954 and as Under-Secretary of State for the Home Department from 1954 to 1957. When Harold Macmillan became Prime Minister in January 1957, Mancroft was appointed Parliamentary Secretary to the Minister of Defence, Duncan Sandys, a post he held until June the same year, and was then Minister without Portfolio from 1957 to 1958.

== Writing ==
He was a frequent contributor of humorous articles to Punch magazine and other publications. Three books of his articles have been published:

- Booking the Cooks, 1969.
- A Chinaman in My Bath, and Other Pieces, 1974.
- Bees in Some Bonnets, 1979.

Over half of the third book consists of material published in the previous two books.

== Family ==
Lord Mancroft married Diana Lloyd, daughter of Lieutenant-Colonel Horace Lloyd, on 8 May 1951. They have three children:

- Hon. Victoria Lucinda Mancroft (b. 7 March 1952), married Prince Frederick Nicholas of Prussia (son of Prince Frederick of Prussia) on 27 February 1980.
- Hon. Jessica Rosetta Mancroft (b. 10 May 1954), married Simon Dickinson on 15 October 1983.
- Benjamin Mancroft, 3rd Baron Mancroft (b. 16 May 1957), married Emma Louisa Peart on 20 September 1990.

Diana Lloyd was married before to Richard Bridges St. John Quarry. They have two daughters: Venetia, Mrs Frederick Barker, then Viscountess Wimborne (born 1942), and Miranda, Countess of Stockton (1947–2020).

== Arms ==
Coat of arms of Stormont Mancroft, 2nd Baron Mancroft
Crest In front of a representation of Norwich Castle with three cupolas issuant from each a staff Proper flying therefrom a banner Argent charged with a cross Gules a sword sheathed Gules garnished Or pommelled and hilted Or and a mace Gold in saltire (i.e. a representation of the ancient Crystal Mace and the Sword in the Regalia of the Corporation of the City of Norwich). Escutcheon Gules a chevron chequy Argent and Sable between in chief two portcullises chained Or and in base a representation of Farnham Castle triple towered Or on a chief Or a lion passant guardant Sable. Supporters On either side a whiffler of the Corporation of the City of Norwich Proper. Motto COURAGE, PATIENCE

Political offices
Preceded by The Lord Lloyd	Lord-in-waiting; 1952–1954	Succeeded by The Lord Fairfax of Cameron
Preceded by The Lord Lloyd	Under-Secretary of State for the Home Department; 1954–1957	Succeeded by Patricia Hornsby-Smith
Peerage of the United Kingdom
Preceded by Arthur Samuel	Baron Mancroft; 1942–1987	Succeeded by Benjamin Mancroft
