= 1991 Ribble Valley by-election =

By-election in Lancashire, England

- 7 March 1991

Constituency of Ribble Valley
- Turnout: 71.1% (▼8.0%)
	First party	Second party	Third party
	LD	Con	Lab
Candidate	Michael Carr	Nigel Evans	Josie Farrington
Party	Liberal Democrats	Conservative	Labour
Popular vote	22,377	17,776	4,356
Percentage	48.5%	38.5%	9.5%
Swing	▲27.1%	▼22.3%	▼8.3%
MP before election
David Waddington
Conservative
Subsequent MP
Michael Carr
Liberal Democrats

The 1991 Ribble Valley by-election, in Lancashire, England, took place on 7 March 1991 following the elevation of MP David Waddington to the House of Lords. Michael Carr of the Liberal Democrats won election at his third attempt.

The seat, based largely on the market town of Clitheroe, had previously been safely Conservative but at the time Margaret Thatcher's controversial "Poll Tax" policy was used by opposition parties against the Conservative candidate. The tax was abolished soon afterwards by Thatcher's successor John Major, who had succeeded Thatcher on her resignation in November 1990.

The then-young Liberal Democrats maintained the record of their parent parties at often scoring by-election "scalps" by winning apparently-safe seats, although rarely holding them at subsequent general elections. Indeed, despite their victory at Ribble Valley, the Lib Dems lost the seat a little over a year later at the 1992 general election to the Conservative Nigel Evans who held the seat until the 2024 general election.

== Result ==
Ribble Valley by-election, 1991
Party	Candidate	Votes	%	±%
Liberal Democrats	Michael Carr	22,377	48.5	+27.1
Conservative	Nigel Evans	17,776	38.5	−22.3
Labour	Josephine Farrington	4,356	9.5	−8.3
Ind. Conservative	David Brass	611	1.3	N/A
Green	Halldora Ingham	466	1.0	N/A
Monster Raving Loony	Screaming Lord Sutch	278	0.6	N/A
Liberal	Simon Taylor	133	0.3	N/A
Corrective Party	Lindi St Claire	72	0.2	N/A
Raving Loony Green Giant Clitheroe Kid	Stuart Hughes	60	0.1	N/A
Majority		4,601	10.0	N/A
Turnout		46,129	71.1	−8.0
Liberal Democrats gain from Conservative		Swing	+24.7	

== Previous result ==
General election 1987: Ribble Valley
Party	Candidate	Votes	%	±%
Conservative	David Waddington	30,136	60.9	―2.5
SDP	Michael Carr	10,608	21.4	―1.7
Labour	Greg Pope	8,781	17.7	+4.2
Majority		19,528	39.5	―0.8
Turnout		49,525	79.1	+2.3
Conservative hold		Swing	―0.4	

== See also ==
- Lists of United Kingdom by-elections
- List of parliamentary constituencies in Lancashire
