= Albert Smith (British politician) =

British politician (1867–1942)

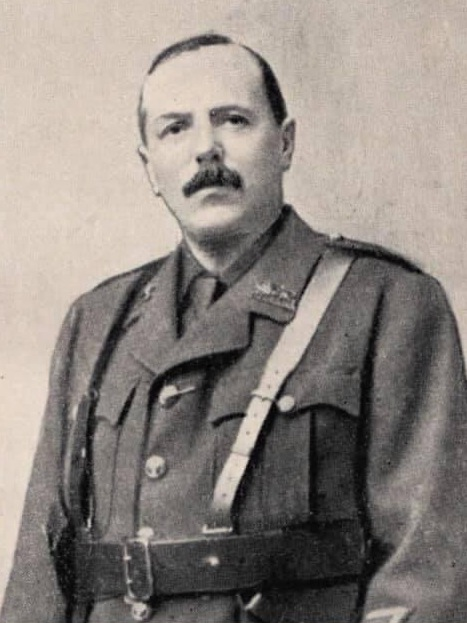
- Born: 15 June 1867; Cowling, Yorkshire
- Died: 7 April 1942 (aged 74)
- Military career
- Allegiance: United Kingdom
- Branch: British Army
- Rank: Captain
- Unit: Royal Lancaster Regiment
- Conflicts: World War I Gallipoli campaign Third Battle of Krithia
- Awards: Order of the British Empire

Captain Albert Smith OBE, JP, DL (15 June 1867 – 7 April 1942) was a British trade unionist and Labour Party politician from Nelson in Lancashire. He sat in the House of Commons from 1910 to 1920.

== Early life and political career ==
The son of Leeming Smith and Martha Smith from Cowling in Yorkshire, he was first employed as a mill boy at the age of 8. He became vice-president and Secretary of the Colne Overlookers Association in 1898, and later secretary of the Nelson Overlookers Association. In 1902, and again from 1920 to 1927, he was the president of the General Union of Powerloom Overlookers, and he was also president of the Nelson and District Textile Trades Federation.

He married Elizabeth Ann and they together had a daughter Martha Lizzie in 1892, but she died on 21 February 1918.

Smith served on Nelson town council from 1902 to 1912, became an alderman of Nelson, served as the town's mayor from 1908 to 1910, and was also a justice of the peace in Nelson. He was elected at the December 1910 general election as the member of parliament (MP) for the Clitheroe division of Lancashire.

He was present at the Burnley 1914 FA Cup Final game as well as the post-game celebration dinner, giving a speech detailing how the day had gone after the match.

== Military service ==
During World War I, he served with the Royal Lancaster Regiment as a captain. He declared on commission that prior to this he had served for three years in the 4th Battalion of the same regiment during his youth.

On 1 November 1914 he attended a meeting at Sabden with cross-party support, giving a speech that was reported on as follows:

"They deplored from the bottom of their hearts that civilised nations had millions of men killing one another, and the only end to it could be suffering and distress. He was an Englishman and he believed their cause was just and true, and as far as he was concerned he was prepared to do all he could to get out of it as quickly and successfully as possible. Had we never gone to the assistance of Belgium, had we stood by and shirked our duty, had we refrained from carrying out our compact, what would the world have said of us? Such a course would have been the negation of all our national aspirations, and all that our national flag stood for. When the Germans determined to walk through Belgium, and threatened if force were used, to destroy Belgium as a nation, it was to Belgium’s everlasting credit that they manifested an undying spirit and determination to defend their national aspirations and their hearths and their homes. Nothing could defeat a spirit of that kind. Disastrous as the war might be, they would rise up again as a nation. In Belgium there were ruined homes, scattered families, wives separated from husbands, brothers from sisters, parents from children. They were going to succour them as a mother, and do all they could to make them comfortable. It was our duty as a nation to assist them in arms, and also to assist them to keep body and soul together. He had been chastised for sinking political differences and uniting on the question of the war, but it made no difference to him; he was going to ask men to come to their assistance. It was better to volunteer than to have conscription".

He arrived at Gallipoli on 13 May 1915 attached to the 1/7th Manchester Regiment, taking command of D Company from 17 June 1915, but was invalided out in late July 1915 due to dysentery and severe heat stroke (with the heat stroke being so severe that the ship returning him home was forced to leave him at Gibraltar), returning to service in 1917. A photograph of him smoking at Fort Stamford in Plymouth was taken whilst he was serving with the 3rd Battalion of his regiment during this time. He resigned from active military service in December 1917 due to his advancing age and the long term medical effects of his earlier illness.

Albert’s youngest brother, William Henry Smith

On 28 April 1917 his youngest brother Private William Henry Smith of the Royal Marine Light Infantry 1st Battalion was killed during the Battle of Arras, with Albert being informed that his brother was Missing in Action by the Admiralty. Confirmation of William's death came months later, with no known grave.

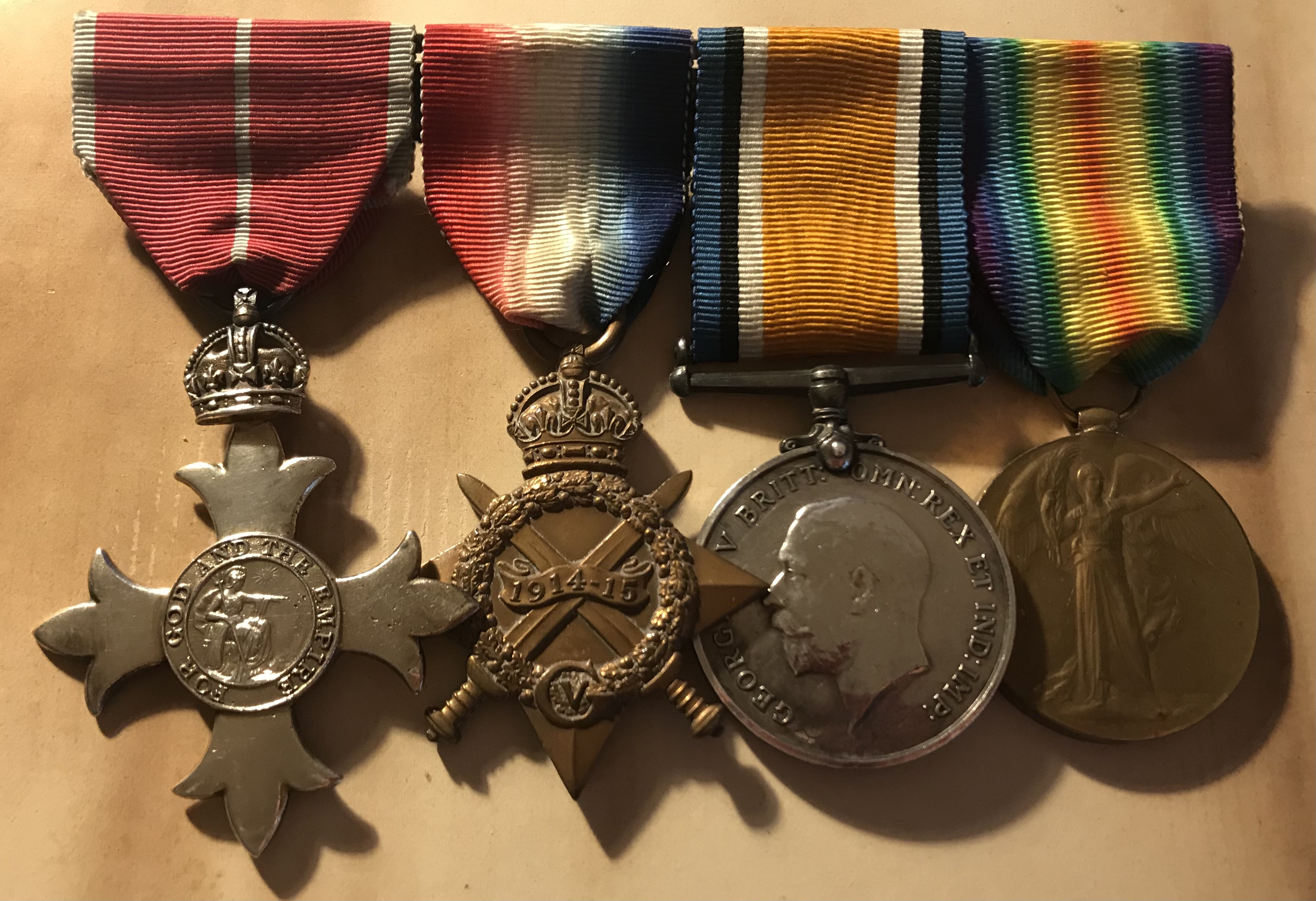
The medals awarded to Captain Smith for his WWI service

For his war services he was awarded the 1914-15 Star, the British War Medal, the Victory Medal and the Order of the British Empire.

== Post-war career ==
Smith held his seat until the 1918 general election, when he was elected for the new parliamentary borough of Nelson and Colne, but resigned his seat on 20 June 1920 by the procedural device of accepting appointment as Steward of the Manor of Northstead in order to take up a full-time post as a trade union official. He later also served as Deputy Lieutenant of the County of Lancashire.

== Death and burial ==
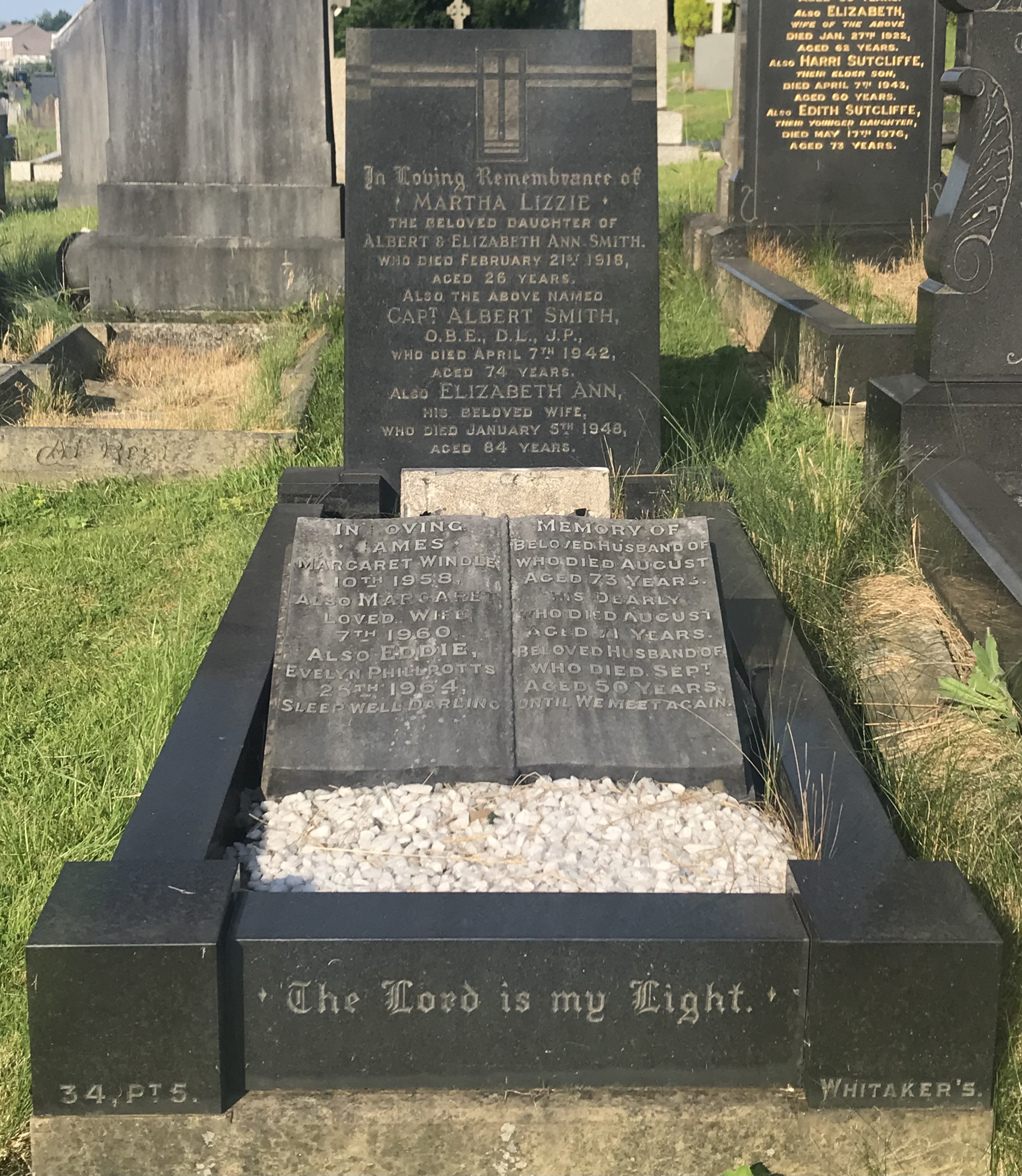
Captain Smith's grave

Smith died on 7 April 1942, and is buried at Walton Lane Cemetery, Nelson.

Parliament of the United Kingdom
Preceded by David James Shackleton	Member of Parliament for Clitheroe; Dec 1910–1918	Succeeded by Alfred Davies
New constituency	Member of Parliament for Nelson & Colne; 1918–1920	Succeeded by Robinson Graham
Trade union offices
Preceded by William C. Robinson	Vice President of the United Textile Factory Workers' Association; 1913–1919	Succeeded by Edward Duxbury
