= Robinson Graham =

British trade unionist and politician

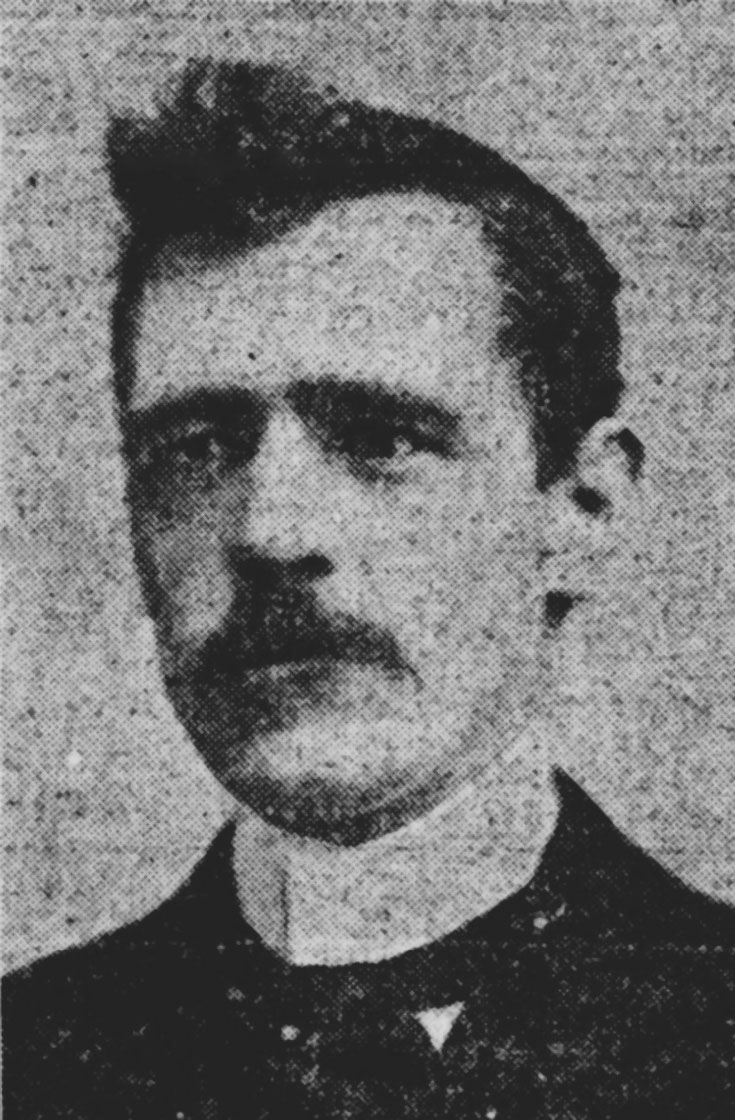

Member of Parliament for Nelson and Colne
- In office June 1920 – October 1922
- Preceded by: Albert Smith
- Succeeded by: Arthur Greenwood

Personal details
- Born: 1878 Burnley, Lancashire
- Died: 13 May 1953 (aged 74–75) Burnley, Lancashire
- Party: Labour

Robinson Graham (1878 – 13 May 1953) was a British trade unionist and politician.

Born in Burnley, Graham became a weaver and was active in the Burnley Weavers' Association, becoming its assistant secretary in 1911 and serving for many years. He was also active in Labour Party, for whom he stood in the 1920 Nelson and Colne by-election. He won the seat, but fell out with the United Textile Factory Workers' Association, which was sponsoring his candidacy, and the Labour Party leadership, and was pressured into standing down at the 1922 general election. He was only one of two Labour MPs to not seek re-election. He concentrated on his trade union office; in 1941, he became secretary of the Burnley Weavers, serving until 1947.

Towards the end of his life, Graham developed loss of sight and became depressed after his wife died. He died on 13 May 1953 from inhalation of coal gas.

Parliament of the United Kingdom
Preceded by Albert Smith	Member of Parliament for Nelson and Colne; 1920–1922	Succeeded by Arthur Greenwood
Trade union offices
Preceded by James Hindle	Secretary of the Burnley Weavers' Association; 1940 – 1947	Succeeded by Harold Dickinson
