= 1968 Nelson and Colne by-election =

UK Parliamentary by-election

The 1968 Nelson and Colne by-election was a by-election held for the British House of Commons constituency of Nelson and Colne on 27 June 1968, following the death of Labour Member of Parliament (MP) Sydney Silverman.

The constituency was considered usually safe, having been won by Labour at the 1966 general election by over 4,500 votes.

== Candidates ==
- Betty Boothroyd, at the time a Hammersmith councillor, was chosen to represent Labour. She would eventually go on to become the first female Speaker of the House of Commons.
- David Waddington was the Conservative candidate. He had been called to the Bar in 1951.
- The local Liberal association nominated David Chadwick. In March, when it was first known that there would be a by-election, the Liberal Party approached Sir Learie Constantine to stand as its candidate. Constantine was a former West Indies cricketer who had played professionally in Lancashire and lived in London. He had spoken out against the Commonwealth Immigrants Act 1968, and Liberal Leader Jeremy Thorpe thought that he would be an ideal candidate to make a stand against racism in society. However, Constantine declined the offer.
- Brian Tattersall stood as a candidate with the label "English Nationalist".

== Result of the previous general election ==
General election 1966: Nelson and Colne
| Party | Candidate | Votes | % | ±% |
|---|---|---|---|---|
| Labour | Sydney Silverman | 18,406 | 49.28 | |
| Conservative | Peter Davies | 13,829 | 37.02 | |
| Independent | Patrick Downey | 5,117 | 13.70 | |
| Majority | | 4,577 | 12.26 | |
| Turnout | | 37,352 | 81.0 | +0.2 |
| Labour hold | | Swing | +2.3 | |

== Result of the by-election ==
Nelson and Colne by-election, 27 June 1968
| Party | Candidate | Votes | % | ±% |
|---|---|---|---|---|
| Conservative | David Waddington | 16,466 | 48.89 | +11.87 |
| Labour | Betty Boothroyd | 12,944 | 38.43 | −10.85 |
| Liberal | David Chadwick | 3,016 | 8.95 | −4.75 |
| English Nationalist | Brian Tattersall | 1,255 | 3.73 | New |
| Majority | | 3,522 | 10.46 | N/A |
| Turnout | | 33,681 | | |
| Conservative gain from Labour | | Swing | +11.4 | |
