= Baron Mancroft =

Barony in the Peerage of the United Kingdom

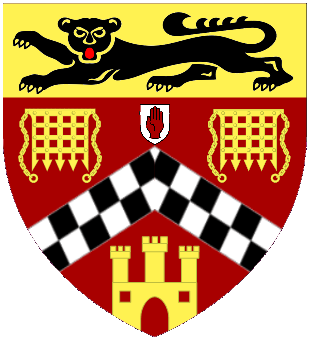
Escutcheon of Lord Mancroft

Baron Mancroft, of Mancroft in the City of Norwich, is a title in the Peerage of the United Kingdom. It was created in 1937 for the Conservative politician Sir Arthur Samuel, 1st Baronet. He had already been created a Baronet, of Mancroft in the City of Norwich in the County of Norfolk, in 1932. His son, the second Baron, was also a Conservative politician. In 1925 he assumed by deed poll the surname of Mancroft. As of 2010 the titles are held by the latter's only son, the third Baron, who succeeded in 1987. He is one of the ninety elected hereditary peers that remain in the House of Lords after the passing of the House of Lords Act of 1999. Lord Mancroft sits on the Conservative benches.

== Barons Mancroft (1937) ==
- Arthur Michael Samuel, 1st Baron Mancroft (1872–1942)
- Stormont Mancroft Samuel Mancroft, 2nd Baron Mancroft (1914–1987)
- Benjamin Lloyd Stormont Mancroft, 3rd Baron Mancroft (b. 1957)

The heir apparent is the present holder's eldest son Hon. Arthur Louis Stormont Mancroft (b. 1995)

== Arms ==
Coat of arms of the Barons Mancroft
Crest In front of a representation of Norwich Castle with three cupolas issuant from each a staff Proper flying therefrom a banner Argent charged with a cross Gules a sword sheathed Gules garnished Or pommelled and hilted Or and a mace Gold in saltire (i.e. a representation of the ancient Crystal Mace and the Sword in the Regalia of the Corporation of the City of Norwich). Escutcheon Gules a chevron chequy Argent and Sable between in chief two portcullises chained Or and in base a representation of Farnham Castle triple towered Or on a chief Or a lion passant guardant Sable. Supporters On either side a whiffler of the Corporation of the City of Norwich Proper. Motto COURAGE, PATIENCE
