= David Waddington =

British politician (1929–2017)

The Right Honourable The Lord Waddington GCVO PC QC DL
- Portrait by Nick Sinclair, 1991

Governor of Bermuda
- In office 11 April 1992 – 2 May 1997
- Monarch: Elizabeth II
- Premier: John Swan; David Saul; Pamela Gordon
- Preceded by: Desmond Langley
- Succeeded by: Thorold Masefield

Leader of the House of Lords; Lord Keeper of the Privy Seal
- In office 28 November 1990 – 11 April 1992
- Prime Minister: John Major
- Preceded by: The Lord Belstead
- Succeeded by: The Lord Wakeham

Home Secretary
- In office 26 October 1989 – 28 November 1990
- Prime Minister: Margaret Thatcher
- Preceded by: Douglas Hurd
- Succeeded by: Kenneth Baker

Government Chief Whip in the House of Commons; Parliamentary Secretary to the Treasury
- In office 13 June 1987 – 24 July 1989
- Prime Minister: Margaret Thatcher
- Preceded by: John Wakeham
- Succeeded by: Tim Renton

Minister of State for Immigration
- In office 6 January 1983 – 13 June 1987
- Prime Minister: Margaret Thatcher
- Preceded by: Timothy Raison
- Succeeded by: Tim Renton

Parliamentary Under-Secretary of State for Employment
- In office 5 January 1981 – 6 January 1983
- Prime Minister: Margaret Thatcher
- Preceded by: Patrick Mayhew
- Succeeded by: John Gummer

Lord Commissioner of the Treasury
- In office 16 May 1979 – 5 January 1981
- Prime Minister: Margaret Thatcher
- Preceded by: Alfred Bates
- Succeeded by: John Wakeham

Member of the House of Lords
- Lord Temporal
- Life peerage 4 December 1990 – 26 March 2015

Member of Parliament for Ribble Valley Clitheroe (1979–1983)
- In office 1 March 1979 – 29 November 1990
- Preceded by: David Walder
- Succeeded by: Michael Carr

Member of Parliament for Nelson and Colne
- In office 27 June 1968 – 20 September 1974
- Preceded by: Sydney Silverman
- Succeeded by: Doug Hoyle

Personal details
- Born: David Charles Waddington; 2 August 1929 Burnley, Lancashire, England
- Died: 23 February 2017 (aged 87) South Cheriton, Somerset, England
- Party: Conservative
- Spouse: Gillian Green (m. 1958)
- Children: 5
- Education: Hertford College, Oxford; Gray's Inn

David Charles Waddington, Baron Waddington, GCVO, PC, QC, DL (2 August 1929 – 23 February 2017) was a British politician and barrister.

A member of the Conservative Party, he served as a Member of Parliament (MP) in the House of Commons from 1968 to 1974 and 1979 to 1990, and was then made a life peer in the House of Lords. During his parliamentary career, Waddington worked in government as Chief Whip, then as Home Secretary and finally as Leader of the House of Lords. He then served as the Governor of Bermuda between 1992 and 1997.

== Early life ==
Waddington was born in Burnley, Lancashire, the youngest of five. His father and grandfather were both solicitors in Burnley. He was educated at Cressbrook School and Sedbergh School, both independent schools.

He then attended Hertford College, Oxford, where he became President of the Oxford University Conservative Association. He was called to the Bar at Gray's Inn in 1951.

Waddington failed to adequately defend Stefan Kiszko, a civil servant accused of the murder of Lesley Molseed, at Leeds Crown Court in July 1976 in what would become one of the most notorious miscarriages of justice in British legal history. Waddington did not review or question any of the 6000+ statements that the prosecution presented at the last minute. He also failed to ask about semen evidence that could have proved Kiszko's innocence since the sample Kiszko provided did not match semen retained from Molseed's body. Kiszko served 16 years in prison, receiving frequent violent attacks for being a "child killer", after wrongly being found guilty. He died of a massive heart attack 20 months after he was fully released. The real murderer was eventually convicted in 2007. Waddington was a strong supporter of capital punishment.

== Political career ==
Waddington stood for election several times before being successful. He was the Conservative candidate at Farnworth in the 1955 general election, at Nelson and Colne in 1964, and at Heywood and Royton in 1966.

He was first elected to Parliament at the 1968 Nelson and Colne by-election, caused by the death of Labour MP Sydney Silverman. He was re-elected there in 1970 and in February 1974, but lost his seat at the October 1974 general election by a margin of 669 votes to Labour's Doug Hoyle.

Waddington was returned to Parliament for Clitheroe at a by-election in March 1979, and was subsequently elected for the broadly similar Ribble Valley constituency in 1983.

=== In government ===
A junior minister under Margaret Thatcher, Waddington was a Lord Commissioner of the Treasury and Government Whip (1979–81), Parliamentary Under-Secretary at the Department of Employment (1981–83), Minister of State at the Home Office (1983–87), and Chief Whip from 1987 until his elevation to Cabinet level in 1989, when he became Home Secretary. On Monday 5 November 1990, he was the guest-of-honour at the annual dinner of the Conservative Monday Club

=== Life peer ===
On 4 December 1990, he was created a life peer as Baron Waddington, of Read in the County of Lancashire. He served as Lord Privy Seal and Leader of the House of Lords until 1992. He then served as Governor of Bermuda from 1992 until 1997.

Lord Waddington was appointed a Knight Grand Cross of the Royal Victorian Order (GCVO) in 1994. In 2008, his amendment to the Criminal Justice and Immigration Bill, known as the Waddington Amendment, inserted a freedom of speech clause into new anti-homophobic hate crime legislation.

In November 2009, the Government failed to repeal the Waddington Amendment in the Coroners and Justice Bill. On 26 March 2015, Lord Waddington retired from the House of Lords pursuant to Section 1 of the House of Lords Reform Act 2014.

== Personal life ==
Waddington married Gillian Rosemary Green (born 1939), the daughter of Alan Green, on 20 December 1958. The couple had three sons and two daughters.

Lord Waddington died of pneumonia on 23 February 2017, at his home in South Cheriton, Somerset, aged 87.

== Arms ==
Coat of arms of David Waddington
Coronet A Coronet of a Baron Crest An Arm embowed vested Azure, issuing from the Sleeve of a Silk Gown Sable, the Hand proper, holding a Wreath of four Roses Gules, barbed and seeded proper, enfiled by a Sword point upwards Argent, Hilt Pommel and Quillons Or. Escutcheon Ermine, on a Cross Azure, between four Roses Gules, barbed and seeded proper, a Lion's Head guardant Or, langued Gules. Supporters Dexter: A Lion in trian aspect; Sinister: a Griffin, both Or, armed and langued Gules, gorged with a Bar dancetty Ermine, edged Azure, each statant erect amid Reeds growing from a Grassy Mount proper. Motto Deus Noster Refugium Et Virtus (God is our refuge and courage)

Parliament of the United Kingdom
Preceded by Sydney Silverman	Member of Parliament for Nelson and Colne; 1968–1974	Succeeded by Doug Hoyle
Preceded by David Walder	Member of Parliament for Clitheroe; 1979–1983	Constituency abolished
New constituency	Member of Parliament for Ribble Valley; 1983–1990	Succeeded by Michael Carr
Political offices
Preceded by John Wakeham	Chief Whip of the Conservative Party; 1987–1989	Succeeded by Tim Renton
Preceded by John Wakeham	Parliamentary Secretary to the Treasury; 1987–1989	Succeeded by Tim Renton
Preceded by Douglas Hurd	Home Secretary; 1989–1990	Succeeded by Kenneth Baker
Preceded by The Lord Belstead	Leader of the House of Lords; 1990–1992	Succeeded by The Lord Wakeham
Preceded by The Lord Belstead	Lord Privy Seal; 1990–1992	Succeeded by The Lord Wakeham
Party political offices
Preceded by The Lord Belstead	Leader of the Conservative Party in the House of Lords; 1990–1992	Succeeded by The Lord Wakeham
Government offices
Preceded by Desmond Langley	Governor of Bermuda; 1992–1997	Succeeded by Thorold Masefield
