= 1920 Nelson and Colne by-election =

UK Parliamentary by-election

- 17 June 1920 (Polling); 30 June 1920 (Declaration)
- Registered: 43,757
- Turnout: 65.2%
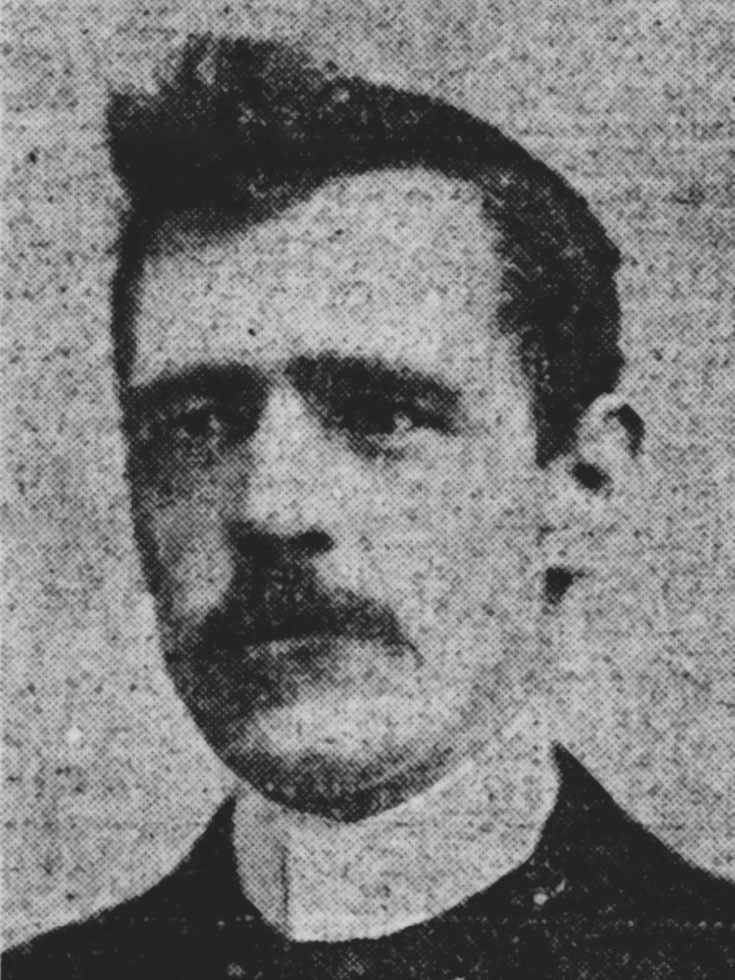

		Uni
Candidate	Robinson Graham	Frederick Wainwright	Walter Rea
Party	Labour	Unionist	Liberal
Alliance		Coalition
Popular vote	14,134	8,577	5,805
Percentage	49.6%	30.1%	20.4%
Swing	▼12.4%	New	▼17.6%
MP before election
Albert Smith
Labour
Subsequent MP
Robinson Graham
Labour

The 1920 Nelson and Colne by-election was held on 17 June 1920 after the resignation of the incumbent Labour MP, Albert Smith. It was retained by the Labour candidate Robinson Graham.

== Background ==
Albert Smith who won the inaugural election for in seat in 1918 (having held Clitheroe since December 1910) resigned his seat on 20 June 1920 by the procedural device of accepting appointment as Steward of the Manor of Northstead in order to take up a full-time post as a trade union official.

== Candidates ==
=== Labour ===
- Robinson Graham, Assistant Secretary of the Burnley Weavers' Association

==== Shortlisted candidates ====
- E. Boothman, County Alderman
- Alexander Campbell, Local Councillor
- Andrew Smith, Local Councillor
- Samuel Perry, National Secretary of the Co-operative Party and candidate for Stockport in March 1920

=== Unionist ===
- Frederick Wainwright, Nelson Town Councillor

==== Withdrawn candidates ====
- Amos Nelson, Justice of the peace

=== Liberal ===
- Walter Rea, Lord Commissioner of the Treasury (1915–1916), member for Scarborough (1906–1918)

== Result ==
Nelson and Colne by-election, 1920
Party		Candidate	Votes	%	±%
	Labour	Robinson Graham	14,134	49.6	–12.4
C	Unionist	Frederick Wainwright	8,577	30.1	New
	Liberal	Walter Rea	5,805	20.4	–17.6
Majority			5,557	19.5	–4.5
Turnout			28,516	65.2	+12.9
Registered electors			43,757		+376
	Labour hold		Swing	N/a	
C indicates candidate endorsed by the coalition government.
