= Josie Farrington, Baroness Farrington of Ribbleton =

British Labour Party politician

The Right Honourable The Baroness Farrington of Ribbleton
- Farrington in parliament, 2017

Member of the House of Lords
- Lord Temporal
- Life peerage 29 September 1994 – 30 March 2018

Personal details
- Born: Josephine Cayless; 29 June 1940 Loughborough, England
- Died: 30 March 2018 (aged 77) London, England
- Party: Labour
- Spouse: Michael Farrington (m. 1960)
- Children: 3

Josephine Farrington, Baroness Farrington of Ribbleton (née Cayless; 29 June 1940 – 30 March 2018) was a British Labour Party politician, active in local government internationally before her elevation to the Lords in 1994.

== Early life ==
Josephine Cayless was born in Loughborough in 1940. She worked as a teacher, even though she had left school at age sixteen.

== Politics ==
She was a Preston Borough Councillor from 1973 to 1976. In 1977, she was elected to Lancashire County Council and held several senior positions, including chair of the Education Committee. From 1981 to 1994 she was a Member of the Council of Europe Standing Conference of Local and Regional Authorities and of its successor the Congress of the Council of Europe. She acted as an international observer at local elections in Poland, Ukraine and Albania. She was also a Member of the Committee of the Regions of the European Union and was Chairman of Education and Training in 1994.

Farrington was the Labour candidate at the 1983 general election for the constituency of West Lancashire and stood for the party again at the 1991 Ribble Valley by-election. On 29 September 1994, she was created a life peer as Baroness Farrington of Ribbleton, of Fulwood in the County of Lancashire. She was a government spokesperson in the Lords for several issues between 1997 and 2010.

== Personal life ==
Cayless married Michael Farrington in 1960; the couple had three sons. She died from lung cancer at her residence in Dolphin Square, London, on 30 March 2018, at the age of 77.
