= Thorold Masefield =

British diplomat

John Thorold Masefield, CMG (born 1 October 1939) is a British retired diplomat.

== Career ==
From 1994 to 1997, he served as High Commissioner of the United Kingdom to Nigeria and from 1989 to 1992, he served as High Commissioner of the United Kingdom to Tanzania. Masefield served as Governor of Bermuda from 4 June 1997 to 17 November 2001. During his tenure, he oversaw the banning of McDonald's and other fast food restaurants from the island.

== Personal life ==
Masefield was married to Jennifer Masefield, an orthopaedic nurse and physiotherapist who was active in charitable work during his governorship. The couple had three children: Nigel, Sally and Roger. During their years in Bermuda, she served as patron of Pals, the island’s cancer charity, and the couple were known for their support of community and compassionate-care initiatives. In later life, she developed Alzheimer’s disease and died in April 2019 at the age of 79.
