= Longridge High School =

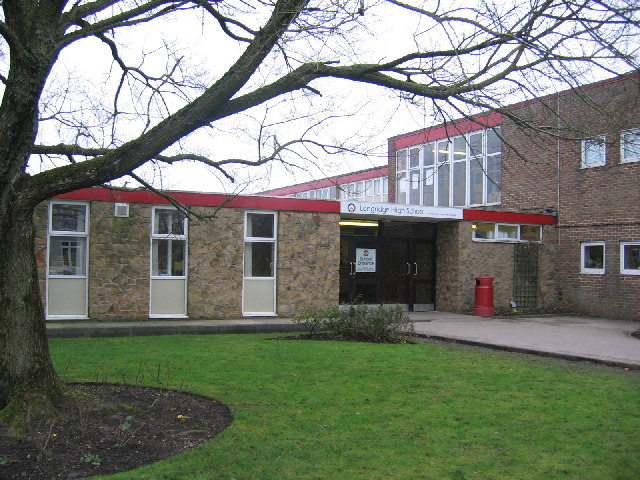
- Main entrance (2006)

Location
- Preston Road; Longridge; Lancashire, PR3 3AR; England
- Coordinates: 53.82614°N 2.6073°W

Information
- Type: Academy
- Local authority: Lancashire
- Trust: The Bay Learning Trust
- Department for Education URN: 150092 Tables
- Ofsted: Reports
- Headteacher: Jane Green
- Gender: Coeducational
- Age: 11 to 16
- Enrolment: 801 as of September 2023
- Website: https://www.lhs.lancs.sch.uk/

Longridge High School is a coeducational secondary school located in Longridge in the English county of Lancashire.

Previously a community school administered by Lancashire County Council, in October 2023 Longridge High School converted to academy status. The school is now sponsored by The Bay Learning Trust.

Longridge High School offers GCSEs, BTECs and OCR Nationals as programmes of study for pupils.
