= Peter Pain =

British judge (1913-2003)

Sir Peter Richard Pain (6 September 1913 – 16 January 2003) was a British High Court judge, who for many years specialised in labour law.

Born in Marlborough in Wiltshire, Pain's father was a solicitor. He was educated at Westminster School and Christ Church, Oxford, then became a barrister at Lincoln's Inn. In the early 1930s, he visited a Hitler Youth camp, and the experience convinced him that war was inevitable, and that he should oppose it by becoming a socialist. He joined the Labour Party, for which he stood unsuccessfully in the 1937 Farnham by-election.

Pain was rejected for military service in World War II due to his health, so he joined the Auxiliary Fire Service. He worked with John Horner for the right of auxiliary fire crew to join the Fire Brigades Union.

After the war, Pain initially worked for Walter Raeburn, then built up a practice with Morris Finer and other colleagues, in later years become its head of chambers. He initially focusing on personal injury claims. and his expertise in the field was often called on by trade unions. In 1965, he was made a Queen's Counsel, and in 1972 he was made a Bencher at Lincoln's Inn. He became a leader in the developing field of labour law, taking many cases at the National Industrial Relations Court. When this closed, in 1975, he was appointed as a judge at the High Court of Justice.

Pain was strongly opposed to racism, and following Enoch Powell's Rivers of Blood speech, he volunteered as the chair of the Race Relations Board Conciliation Committee, serving from 1968 until 1971. He then became chair of the South Metropolitan Conciliation Committee. He also served on the Parole Board from 1978 to 1980.

In 1988, Pain was given his own court, with responsibility for adjudicating on pre-trial procedures such as injunctions. He retired in 1993, the last British judge to work regularly past the age of 80.

== Arms ==
Coat of arms of Peter Pain
| Motto Si Bene Statuas Nil Metuas |
