= Linton Thorp =

British politician and judge

Linton Thorp KC

Member of Parliament for Nelson and Colne
- In office 27 October 1931 – 14 November 1935
- Preceded by: Arthur Greenwood
- Succeeded by: Sydney Silverman

Personal details
- Born: Linton Theodore Thorp; 21 February 1884 Marlow, Buckinghamshire, England
- Died: 6 July 1950 (aged 66)
- Party: Conservative (until 1935)
- Education: University College London

Linton Theodore Thorp (21 February 1884 – 6 July 1950) was a British politician and judge.

Born in Marlow in Buckinghamshire, Thorp was educated at Manchester Grammar School and University College London. He became a barrister at Lincoln's Inn in 1906, and from 1919 served as a judge overseas: firstly, in the Egyptian Supreme Court, then from 1921 until 1924 in the Ottoman Porte. He later returned to the UK, was made a King's Counsel in 1932, and a bencher of Lincoln's Inn in 1936. He served as the recorder of Saffron Walden and Maldon from 1932 to 1950.

Thorp was also active in the Conservative Party, and stood for the party in Nelson and Colne at the 1929 general election. Although he was unsuccessful, he stood again in 1931 and won the seat.

In May 1935, Thorp resigned the whip of the National Government, along with Frederick Wolfe Astbury, Joseph Nall, Alfred Todd and Katharine Stewart-Murray, Duchess of Atholl, as they argued some aspects of government policy were too close to socialism, and were unhappy with government policy on India. However, Thorp continued to identify himself with the Conservative Party. He stood in the 1935 general election as an independent Conservative, losing his seat. He was again unsuccessful when he stood as an independent with the backing of the pro-Nazi Liberty Restoration League in the 1937 Farnham by-election.

Parliament of the United Kingdom
| Preceded by Arthur Greenwood | Member of Parliament for Nelson and Colne; 1931 – 1935 | Succeeded by Sydney Silverman |
