= Nelson and Colne =

Parliamentary constituency in the United Kingdom, 1918–1983

- Former borough constituency for the House of Commons
- Nelson and Colne in Lancashire, showing boundaries used from 1974–1983

1918–1983
- Seats: one
- Created from: Clitheroe
- Replaced by: Pendle

Nelson and Colne was a constituency in Lancashire which returned one Member of Parliament (MP) to the House of Commons of the Parliament of the United Kingdom from 1918 until it was abolished for the 1983 general election.

It was largely succeeded by the Pendle constituency.

== Boundaries ==
1918–1950: The Boroughs of Nelson and Colne, the Urban Districts of Barrowford, Brierfield, and Trawden, and the detached part of the parish of Foulridge which was bordered on the north, west and south by the Borough of Colne.

1950–1983: The Boroughs of Nelson and Colne, and the Urban Districts of Barrowford, Brierfield, and Trawden.

== Members of Parliament ==
Election	Member	Party
1918	Albert Smith	Labour
1920 by-election	Robinson Graham	Labour
1922	Arthur Greenwood	Labour
1931	Linton Thorp	Conservative
1935	Sydney Silverman	Labour
1968 by-election	David Waddington	Conservative
Oct 1974	Doug Hoyle	Labour
1979	John Lee	Conservative

== Elections ==
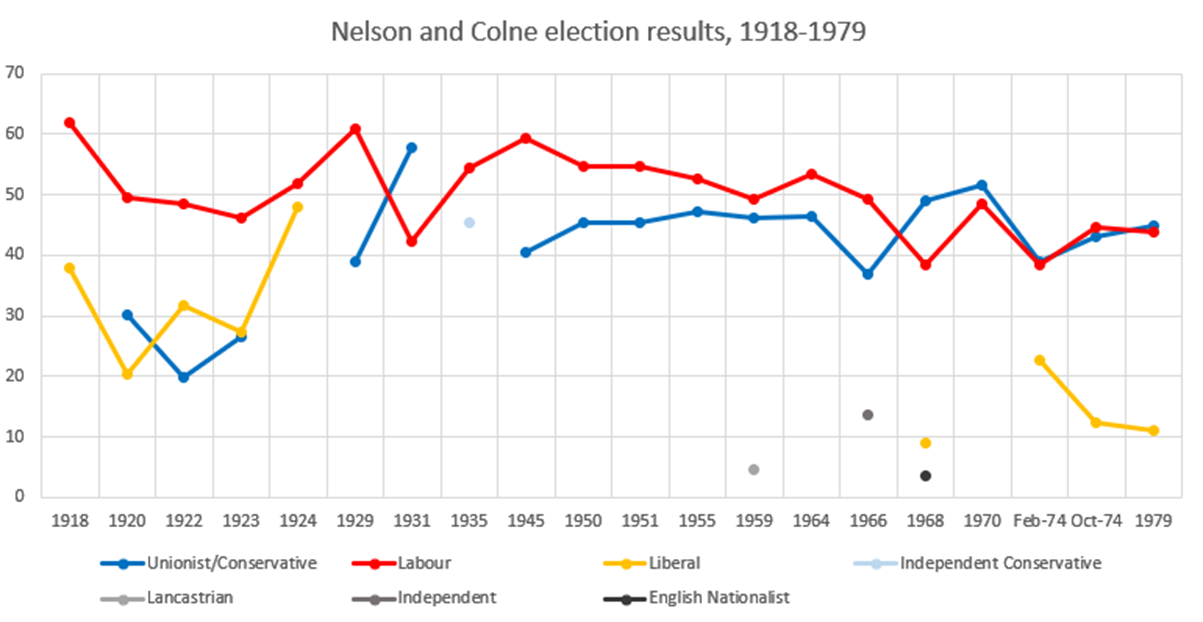
Nelson and Colne election results

=== Elections in the 1910s ===
General election 1918: Nelson and Colne
Party	Candidate	Votes	%	±%
Labour	Albert Smith	14,075	62.0	
Liberal	Fred Greenwood	8,623	38.0	
Majority		5,452	24.0	
Turnout		22,698	52.3	
Registered electors		43,381		
Labour win (new seat)				

=== Elections in the 1920s ===
By-election 1920: Nelson and Colne
Party		Candidate	Votes	%	±%
	Labour	Robinson Graham	14,134	49.5	−12.5
C	Unionist	Frederick Norman Wainwright	8,577	30.1	N/A
	Liberal	Walter Rea	5,805	20.4	−17.6
Majority			5,557	19.4	−4.6
Turnout			28,516	65.2	+12.9
Registered electors			43,757		
	Labour hold		Swing	+2.6	
C indicates candidate endorsed by the coalition government.

General election 1922: Nelson and Colne
Party	Candidate	Votes	%	±%
Labour	Arthur Greenwood	17,714	48.5	−13.5
Liberal	James Henry Sutherland Aitken	11,542	31.6	−6.4
Unionist	Frederick Norman Wainwright	7,286	19.9	N/A
Majority		6,172	16.9	−7.1
Turnout		36,542	83.2	+30.9
Registered electors		43,914		
Labour hold		Swing	−3.6	

General election 1923: Nelson and Colne
Party	Candidate	Votes	%	±%
Labour	Arthur Greenwood	17,083	46.1	−2.4
Liberal	James Henry Sutherland Aitken	10,103	27.3	−4.3
Unionist	Amos Nelson	9,861	26.6	+6.7
Majority		6,980	18.8	+1.9
Turnout		37,047	83.4	+0.2
Registered electors		44,432		
Labour hold		Swing	+1.0	

General election 1924: Nelson and Colne
Party	Candidate	Votes	%	±%
Labour	Arthur Greenwood	19,922	51.9	+5.8
Liberal	James Henry Sutherland Aitken	18,479	48.1	+20.8
Majority		1,443	3.8	−15.0
Turnout		33,348	85.6	+2.2
Registered electors		44,871		
Labour hold		Swing	−7.5	

General election 1929: Nelson and Colne
Party	Candidate	Votes	%	±%
Labour	Arthur Greenwood	28,533	61.0	+9.1
Unionist	Linton Thorp	18,236	39.0	−9.1
Majority		10,297	22.0	+18.2
Turnout		46,769	82.8	−2.8
Registered electors		56,465		
Labour hold		Swing	+9.1	

=== Elections in the 1930s ===
General election 1931: Nelson and Colne
Party	Candidate	Votes	%	±%
Conservative	Linton Thorp	28,747	57.71	
Labour	Arthur Greenwood	21,063	42.29	
Majority		7,684	15.43	N/A
Turnout		49,810	75.93	
Conservative gain from Labour		Swing		

General election 1935: Nelson and Colne
Party	Candidate	Votes	%	±%
Labour	Sydney Silverman	26,011	54.52	
Ind. Conservative	Linton Thorp	21,696	45.48	N/A
Majority		4,315	9.04	
Turnout		47,707	84.73	
Labour gain from Conservative		Swing		

=== Elections in the 1940s ===
General election 1945: Nelson and Colne
Party	Candidate	Votes	%	±%
Labour	Sydney Silverman	25,610	59.4	+11.8
Conservative	Harmar Nicholls	17,484	40.5	−8.5
Majority		8,126	18.9	
Turnout		43,094	76.2	−2.2
Labour hold		Swing		

=== Elections in the 1950s ===
General election 1950: Nelson and Colne
Party	Candidate	Votes	%	±%
Labour	Sydney Silverman	25,358	54.6	
Conservative	Alan Green	21,116	45.4	
Majority		4,242	9.13	
Turnout		46,474	88.28	
Labour hold		Swing		

General election 1951: Nelson and Colne
Party	Candidate	Votes	%	±%
Labour	Sydney Silverman	25,611	54.7	
Conservative	Alan Green	21,211	45.3	
Majority		4,400	9.4	
Turnout		46,822		
Labour hold		Swing		

General election 1955: Nelson and Colne
Party	Candidate	Votes	%	±%
Labour	Sydney Silverman	22,135	52.7	−2.0
Conservative	Elaine Kellett	19,844	47.3	+2.0
Majority		2,291	5.5	
Turnout		41,979	88.4	
Labour hold		Swing	−2.0	

General election 1959: Nelson and Colne
Party	Candidate	Votes	%	±%
Labour	Sydney Silverman	20,407	49.3	−3.4
Conservative	John Crabtree	19,143	46.2	−1.1
Lancastrian Party	Tom Emmott	1,889	4.6	N/A
Majority		1,287	3.1	
Turnout		41,439	85.5	
Labour hold		Swing		

=== Elections in the 1960s ===
General election 1964: Nelson and Colne
Party	Candidate	Votes	%	±%
Labour	Sydney Silverman	20,205	53.5	+4.2
Conservative	David Waddington	17,561	46.5	+0.3
Majority		2,644	7.0	+3.9
Turnout		37,766	80.8	−4.7
Labour hold		Swing	+2.0	

General election 1966: Nelson and Colne
Party	Candidate	Votes	%	±%
Labour	Sydney Silverman	18,406	49.3	−4.2
Conservative	Peter Davies	13,829	37.0	−9.5
Independent	Patrick Downey	5,117	13.7	N/A
Majority		4,577	12.3	
Turnout		37,352	81.0	+0.2
Labour hold		Swing	+2.3	

By-election 1968: Nelson and Colne
Party	Candidate	Votes	%	±%
Conservative	David Waddington	16,466	48.9	+11.9
Labour	Betty Boothroyd	12,944	38.4	−10.9
Liberal	David Chadwick	3,016	9.0	N/A
English Nationalist	Brian Tattersall	1,255	3.7	N/A
Majority		3,522	10.5	
Turnout		33,681		
Conservative gain from Labour		Swing	+11.4	

=== Elections in the 1970s ===
General election 1970: Nelson and Colne
Party	Candidate	Votes	%	±%
Conservative	David Waddington	19,881	51.5	+14.5
Labour	Doug Hoyle	18,471	48.5	−0.8
Majority		1,410	3.0	N/A
Turnout		38,622	78.3	−2.7
Conservative gain from Labour		Swing	+7.7	

General election February 1974: Nelson and Colne
Party	Candidate	Votes	%	±%
Conservative	David Waddington	15,692	38.9	−12.6
Labour	Doug Hoyle	15,515	38.4	−10.1
Liberal	Tony Greaves	9,166	22.7	N/A
Majority		177	0.4	
Turnout		40,373	84.2	+5.9
Conservative hold		Swing	1.3	

General election October 1974: Nelson and Colne
Party	Candidate	Votes	%	±%
Labour	Doug Hoyle	17,506	44.7	+6.3
Conservative	David Waddington	16,836	43.0	+4.1
Liberal	Tony Greaves	4,850	12.4	−10.3
Majority		669	1.7	
Turnout		39,192	81.1	
Labour gain from Conservative		Swing	+1.1	

General election 1979: Nelson and Colne
Party	Candidate	Votes	%	±%
Conservative	John Lee	17,522	45.0	+2.0
Labour	Doug Hoyle	17,086	43.9	−0.8
Liberal	David Hewitt	4,322	11.1	−1.3
Majority		436	1.1	N/A
Turnout		38,930	81.6	+0.5
Conservative gain from Labour		Swing	+1.4	
