= James Morris (British politician) =

British politician (born 1967)

James Morris OBE
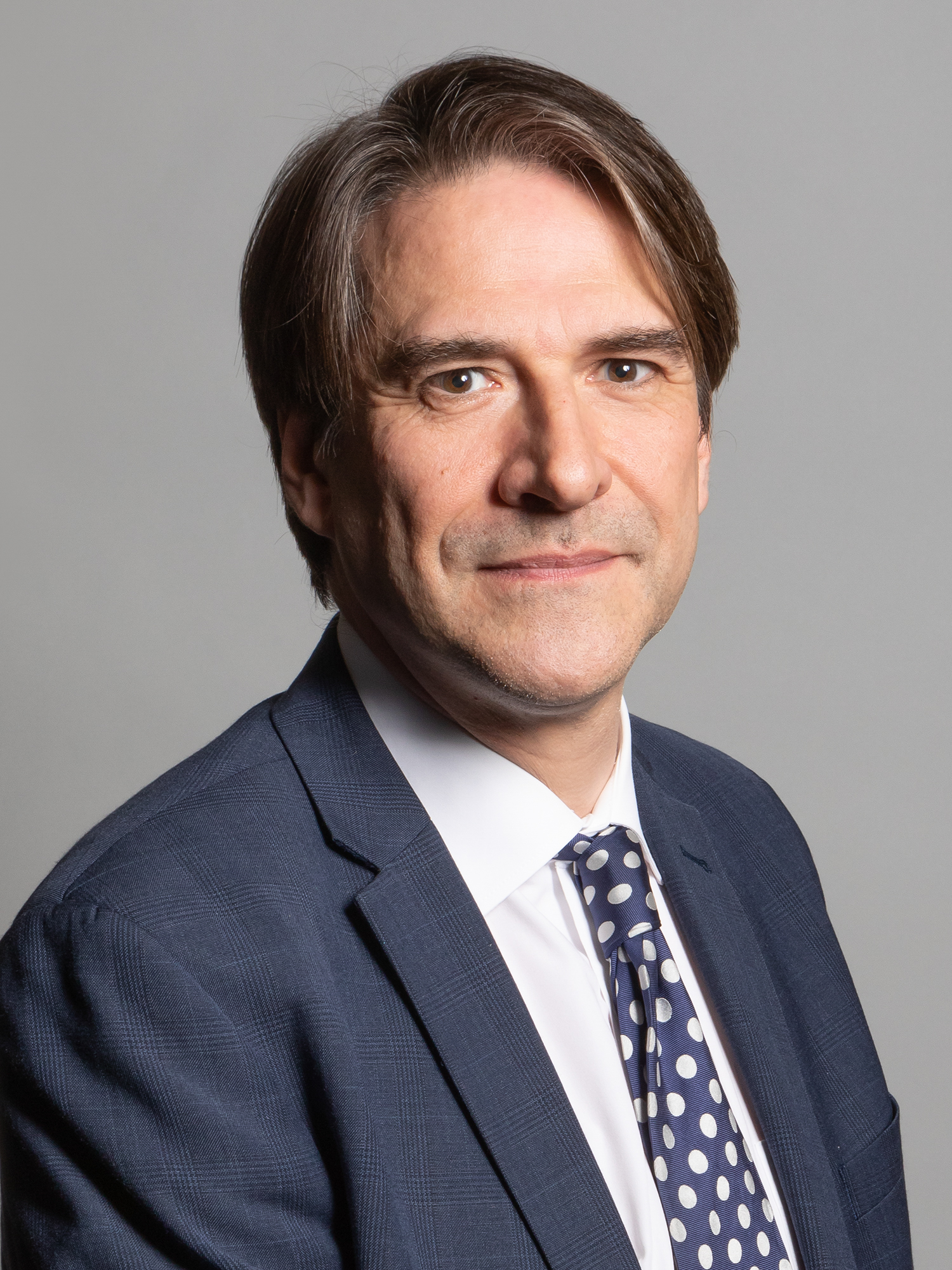
- Official portrait, 2020

Parliamentary Under-Secretary of State for Primary Care and Patient Safety
- In office 8 July 2022 – 8 September 2022
- Prime Minister: Boris Johnson
- Preceded by: Maria Caulfield
- Succeeded by: Neil O'Brien

Vice-Chamberlain of the Household
- In office 17 September 2021 – 8 July 2022
- Prime Minister: Boris Johnson
- Preceded by: Marcus Jones
- Succeeded by: Michael Tomlinson

Lord Commissioner of the Treasury
- In office 14 February 2020 – 17 September 2021
- Prime Minister: Boris Johnson
- Preceded by: Michelle Donelan

Member of Parliament for Halesowen and Rowley Regis
- In office 6 May 2010 – 30 May 2024
- Preceded by: Sylvia Heal
- Succeeded by: Constituency abolished

Personal details
- Born: 4 February 1967 (age 59) Nottingham, Nottinghamshire, England
- Party: Conservative
- Education: University of Birmingham (BA) Wadham College, Oxford (MPhil) Cranfield School of Management (MBA)
- Website: www.jamesmorris.co.uk

James George Morris OBE (born 4 February 1967) is a British politician who served as Parliamentary Under-Secretary of State for Primary Care and Patient Safety from July to September 2022. He served as the Member of Parliament (MP) for Halesowen and Rowley Regis in the West Midlands between 2010 and 2024. He also served as Vice-Chamberlain of the Household from 2021 to 2022. He is a member of the Conservative Party.

== Early life and career ==
Morris was born on 4 February 1967 in Nottingham and grew up in Nottinghamshire. He has roots in the Black Country: his grandfather worked in the Halesowen Steel works in the 1930s and 1940s, his parents are from the Black Country and his uncle lives in Rowley Regis.

Morris was privately educated at Nottingham High School, an independent school for boys in his home city of Nottingham, followed by the University of Birmingham, where he obtained a degree in English Literature. He then undertook Postgraduate research at Wadham College, Oxford. He later studied at Cranfield School of Management.

Before becoming involved in politics in Halesowen and Rowley Regis, Morris had a successful career as a small businessman specialising in computer software. In 2003 he founded Mind the Gap, an independent campaign to promote civic action and to encourage more grass roots involvement in politics. In 2004 he wrote a pamphlet entitled "Change Starts Small" – which explored how to get more local grass roots involvement in politics and argued that the British political system needed fundamental change. Morris is married to Anna and they have two children.

Prior to the 2010 Election, Morris was the Chief Executive of Localis, a local government and localist think tank, where the mission was to 'stimulate and challenge the current orthodoxy of the governance of the UK.' During his time at the think tank, Localis released a number of reports, including The Million Vote Mandate, Can Localism Deliver?, and For Good Measure, all of which he edited.

== Parliamentary career ==
Morris was selected as the seat's Conservative candidate after previous candidate Nigel Hastilow stepped down in November 2007 following Hastilow's remarks stating that warnings by Enoch Powell in his "rivers of blood" speech in 1968 had proved correct.

Morris served on the Communities and Local Government Committee between 2010 and 2014. He is a member of a number of APPGs, including Youth Affairs, United Nations and Mental Health. In March 2011, the Sunday Mercury confirmed that Morris had the best attendance record of all 57 West Midlands MPs – attending 96% of votes. In the local area, Morris has been a supporter of the successful campaign to Save Rowley Hospital which secured and maintained in-patient facilities at the hospital. He has also raised questions over the future for Halesowen Abbey in Parliament.

Morris generally voted against gay rights and against allowing marriage between two people of the same sex.

Morris was PPS to Esther McVey, but resigned his position in January 2015 in order to vote for a change in the law that would require planning permission to demolish or change the use of local pubs.

Morris was opposed to Brexit prior to the 2016 referendum, but since then has consistently voted for the UK to leave.

On 14 February 2020, Morris was appointed a Lord Commissioner of the Treasury (Government Whip) in the second Johnson ministry. On 17 September 2021, he was appointed Vice-Chamberlain of the Household, a senior Government Whip, in the second cabinet reshuffle of the second Johnson ministry. On account of this role, he was "taken hostage" at Buckingham Palace during the 2022 State Opening of Parliament.

== Post-parliamentary career ==
Following his defeat at the 2024 UK General Election, Morris has worked as a Director at cybersecurity firm CSBR.

Parliament of the United Kingdom
Preceded by Sylvia Heal	Member of Parliament for Halesowen & Rowley Regis; 2010–2024	Constituency abolished
