= Localis =

English think tank

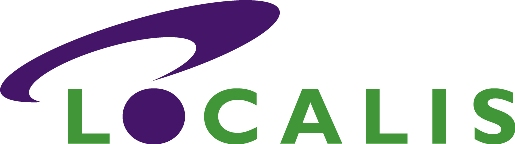
- Formation: 2001; 25 years ago
- Founded at: London, United Kingdom
- Type: Think tank
- Purpose: Localism and Devolution
- Headquarters: Vox Studios, 1-45 Durham Street; London, SE11 5JH
- Chief Executive: Jonathan Werran
- Website: localis.org.uk

Localis is an independent think tank that promotes neo-localist ideas. It was founded in 2001 and is currently based in Westminster, United Kingdom. Its research programme is guided by the concept of neo-localism which it describes as giving places and people more control over the effects of globalisation.

Localis publish papers on a variety of public policy areas, including reshaping the economy; culture, tradition and beauty; reforming public services; and improving family life. Past publications have argued for greater financial autonomy for local authorities, the creation of a national infrastructure bank and that the Right to Buy should be extended into equity slivers. The think tank has also published reports on topics including health and social integration, Local Enterprise Partnerships and municipal enterprise.

Current members of the board include Sir Merrick Cockell (who is also chairman), Councillor Paul Carter, Councillor Paul Bettison, Councillor Louise Goldsmith and former Councillor and Leader of Swindon Borough Council, David Renard. Former chief executives include James Morris, elected as the Member of Parliament (MP) for Halesowen and Rowley Regis in May 2010.

On 25 July 2016, Liam Booth-Smith took over the role of Chief Executive, replacing the outgoing Alex Thomson. Booth-Smith stepped down in 2018, with Jonathan Werran replacing him in July of the same year.

== Notable publications ==
=== Can Localism Deliver? Lessons from Manchester ===
In 2009, Localis published a report entitled Can Localism Deliver? Lessons from Manchester. It series of recommendations to devolve powers to local government was highly influential in the establishment of the Greater Manchester Combined Authority.

The report included a foreword by Michael Heseltine who was influential in the 2010-15 coalition government’s attempts to promote the advancement of devolution, especially through the Northern Powerhouse. Heseltine mentioned in the report that “we need mechanisms that drive communities together, embracing academia, the private sector, the voluntary sector and others with a stake in our society to seek solutions designed in the circumstances on the ground and not forged as a national ‘one solution fits all’ diktat from London.”

=== The Rate Escape: Freeing Local Government to Drive Economic Growth ===
In 2011, the think tank also published a report which argued that local government must be given greater local financial autonomy through being allowed to retain business rates. The report attracted support from a range of prominent figures. Bob Neill said that the report “underlines the real importance of Government's drive to end councils' dependence on the whims of Whitehall grants” whilst Miles Templeman called it a “powerful model for business rate reform”. In 2015, George Osborne announced that English councils would be able to keep all of the proceedings from business rates, calling it “the biggest transfer of power” in recent history.

== Current members of the board ==
- Councillor Merrick Cockell, Chairman
- Councillor Paul Carter
- Councillor Paul Bettison
- Councillor Louise Goldsmith
- David Renard

== See also ==
- List of think tanks in the United Kingdom
