= 1990 Mid Staffordshire by-election =

1990 UK Parliamentary by-election

- 22 March 1990

Constituency of Mid Staffordshire
- Turnout: 77.5% (▼1.9%)
	First party	Second party	Third party
		Con	LD
Candidate	Sylvia Heal	Charles Prior	Timothy Jones
Party	Labour	Conservative	Liberal Democrats
Popular vote	27,649	18,200	6,315
Percentage	49.1%	32.3%	11.2%
Swing	▲24.4%	▼18.3%	▼12.0%
MP before election
John Heddle
Conservative
Subsequent MP
Sylvia Heal
Labour

The 1990 Mid Staffordshire constituency of the United Kingdom Parliament held a by-election on 22 March 1990. The result was the election of Labour candidate Sylvia Heal to succeed the previous Conservative Member of Parliament John Heddle, who had precipitated the by-election by committing suicide.

== Background ==
John Heddle was first elected to Parliament in the 1979 general election when he had gained the Lichfield and Tamworth constituency from Labour. Following boundary changes, he represented Mid Staffordshire from 1983. He was a popular extrovert at Westminster but in the late 1980s he found himself with severe financial problems due to the property price crash, and on 19 December 1989 he was found dead in his Jaguar car in an isolated spot near Chartham, Kent. At the previous general election in 1987 the result had been:

Election	Political result	Candidate	Party	Votes	%
General election, June 1987; Electorate 71,252; Turnout 79.4%	Conservative hold Majority 14,654 (25.9%)	John Heddle	Conservative	28,644	50.6
General election, June 1987; Electorate 71,252; Turnout 79.4%	Conservative hold Majority 14,654 (25.9%)	Crispin St. Hill	Labour	13,990	24.7
General election, June 1987; Electorate 71,252; Turnout 79.4%	Conservative hold Majority 14,654 (25.9%)	Timothy Jones	Liberal	13,114	23.2
General election, June 1987; Electorate 71,252; Turnout 79.4%	Conservative hold Majority 14,654 (25.9%)	James Bazeley	Independent Conservative	836	1.5

== Candidate selection ==
=== Conservative ===
Reports in the press indicated that the local Conservative Association was reported to be in 'some disarray' at the start of the by-election campaign; an experienced agent was sent up from London to run the campaign. The party received 250 applications to stand as candidate, among whom were said to be Lady Olga Maitland; the Conservatives denied rumours that Jeffrey Archer was hoping to stand. On 2 February the Conservatives selected Charles Prior, a 43-year-old chartered accountant from Newbury who was a former member of Berkshire county council and a member of the Bow Group. Prior, managing director of a publishing and training company, was the nephew of former Northern Ireland Secretary James Prior, and beat former MP Richard Ottaway in the final selection.

=== Labour ===
Following criticism of Labour candidates for previous by-elections, the party had set up a panel of five senior members to draw up shortlist of approved candidates, from which the local Constituency Labour Party would make the final selection. Deputy Leader Roy Hattersley was in charge of the process. A shortlist was drawn up during January, with some concerns being reported about whether the candidate from the 1987 election, Crispin St Hill, would be on it. St Hill was a black community worker from Brent and previous by-elections had seen the party resist selecting black candidates for by-elections. He did secure a place on the shortlist but the local party selected Sylvia Heal, who had made a prominent speech at the 1989 party conference supporting the leadership's change of policy on nuclear disarmament from unilateral disarmament to a multilateralist approach. Heal was a social worker and magistrate from Egham, Surrey, who had not previously fought an election.

=== Other parties ===
The first party to announce a candidate was the Social Democratic Party who confirmed on 23 January 1990 that Ian Wood, a 33-year-old solicitor from Lichfield, would stand for them. The Liberal Democrats, although expecting the SDP to stand, were not pleased because they feared being marginalised if the two parties opposed each other. They chose Tim Jones (aged 38), a barrister who had fought the seat in two previous elections and lived in the constituency in Rugeley.

The Green Party candidate Robert Saunders was 29 years old and had lost his job as a buyer in an engineering firm at the start of the campaign. Jim Bazeley, a former Mayor of Lichfield and Conservative leader on Lichfield district council who had fought in 1987 as an Independent Conservative, declared that he would stand again as an 'anti-Thatcher Conservative'. On 6 March the newly formed NHS Supporters Party announced that its candidate would be Dr Christopher Abell, a 34-year-old General practitioner from East Dereham in Norfolk; the party had hoped to find a local candidate and blamed the political connections of the chairman of the Staffordshire Family Practitioner Committee, who was also chairman of Mid Staffordshire Conservative Association.

When nominations closed on 8 March there were seven further candidates. Screaming Lord Sutch of the Official Monster Raving Loony Party, a frequent by-election candidate, was nominated under the name 'Lord David Sutch' after changing his name by deed-poll. He chose the description 'Monster Raving Loony Green Teeth' but was faced with a rival: Stuart Hughes, who was a member of a breakaway group, stood as a Raving Loony Green Giant Supercalifragilistic candidate with the assistance of election agent Danny Bamford. John Hill was the candidate of the National Front while David Black stood as 'Christian Patriotic Alliance Save Britain Campaign' and Nicholas Parker-Jervis stood as 'Against Immigration Conservative Green'.

Lindi St Clair, nicknamed "Miss Whiplash" and famous for running a brothel in London where she claimed there were many MP clients, stood as the "National Independent Correct Edification - NICE" candidate. She campaigned for 'nicer and more mature European attitudes towards sexuality.' Finally, Bernard 'Smiley' Mildwater, protesting Citroën's decision to cease production of the 2CV car, stood as a 'Save the 2CV' candidate. He had resigned from the RAF to fight the election.

== Campaign ==
Polling day was inevitably going to come around the time of the budget, which had been set for 20 March, and initially it was expected that it would be timed to take place before the budget. However Margaret Thatcher decided, in conjunction with Conservative Party chairman Kenneth Baker and Chief Whip Tim Renton to "take it on the chin" and hold the by-election two days after the budget. The by-election was formally called by Renton moving the writ in the House of Commons on 28 February.

At the first Labour campaign press conference on 1 March, Roy Hattersley made an outspoken personal attack on Thatcher for being "arrogant, autocratic and unscrupulous in the pursuit of power", and claimed the main issue of the campaign would be the new local government Community Charge or 'Poll Tax' which was shortly to come into effect. Charles Prior supported the principle of the new tax and blamed the Labour controlled Staffordshire county council and Cannock Chase district council for higher than expected tax levels in Rugeley. When he launched his campaign together with his uncle, Prior visited an old people's home in Rugeley and was reportedly delighted to find may residents agreed with his view; his uncle attacked the Labour alternative tax while expecting that the Government's scheme would eventually be altered. Labour also attempted to focus on the Conservative proposals for the National Health Service, challenging Prior to say whether he supported them and the rise in prescription charges.

=== Opinion polling ===
The Sunday Times commissioned an opinion poll from Mori in the constituency which was published on 4 March. It found that Labour was leading with 50%, the Conservatives had 36% support, and the other parties were trailing: Liberal Democrats 5%, SDP 4% and Green Party 4%. The poll also found that four out of five voters thought the poll tax was the main issue in the election. Labour downplayed the poll. Liberal Democrat leader Paddy Ashdown highlighted the fact that their candidate, alone among the main parties, was local and had not been "chosen in London and parachuted in". He believed Labour's alternative local government 'roof tax' was ridiculous and that his own party's proposal of a local income tax would win votes.

A second poll undertaken by the Birmingham Post was published on 8 March. It also showed a Labour lead, although narrower with Labour at 49% and the Conservatives at 41%. The Green Party and Social Democrat were put at 4% and the Liberal Democrats 2%. On the day it was published the Shadow Chancellor John Smith distanced the party from violent protests against the poll tax but doubted that the Militant tendency (whom the Conservatives were blaming for poll tax disruption) could be behind peaceful protests in places like Barnet and Windsor and Maidenhead. Militant set up public meetings in Rugeley and Lichfield to oppose the poll tax and distributed flyers advertising the All Britain Anti-Poll Tax Federation rally in London planned for 31 March; in reaction Labour rushed out a leaflet based on a speech by party leader Neil Kinnock denouncing 'toytown revolutionaries'. The Conservatives denounced 'rent-a-mob Militants' but pointed to the Labour MPs who had declared that they would refuse to pay the poll tax, demanding that Kinnock remove the party whip.

=== Michael Heseltine ===
Labour noted that Staffordshire police's budget for vehicle replacement had been cut by £1m which meant that the force could not update its motorway patrol cars although they had done 250,000 miles and were on their second engines. David Icke visited on 11 March to assist the Green Party campaign, prompting an attack on the party by the Liberal Democrats who claimed their solution for every problem was to set up a committee. On 12 March the Conservative campaign had to explain that invitations to join the campaign had been sent by the candidate's minder Gerald Howarth to nearly every Conservative MP but had not yet been delivered to former Defence Secretary Michael Heseltine, who was unofficially known to be keen to challenge Thatcher's leadership. Charles Prior was reported to look 'flustered' but insisted that Heseltine would be a tremendous asset if he came to the constituency. Heseltine arrived on 14 March, drawing a far greater number of Conservative activists than had campaigned with Cecil Parkinson three nights previously.

=== Labour campaign ===
The Labour campaign was very tightly controlled by the party officials, under the director of communications Peter Mandelson. Heal held no public meetings and the morning press conferences were limited to 20 minutes (with senior party figures often replying rather than Heal); most of her campaign was conducted on personal appearances in pubs and clubs and 'Red Rose Rallies'. The other parties were angered by this approach, with Liberal Democrat leader Paddy Ashdown denouncing the way Sylvia Heal was "packaged and handled .. as if she was some Walworth Road barbie woman", and that her leaflets said nothing about her ideas or Labour policies. After initially implying that Heal was a 'birdbrain', the Conservatives switched to claiming her control by the party was done in order to conceal Labour policies. The Daily Mail sent a reporter armed with a long list of questions to try to get answers from Heal, but her minder Peter Snape determined to stop him. The Conservatives noted that at the 1989 Labour Party conference Heal had supported a motion to cut defence spending by £5 billion.

A further Birmingham Post poll on 15 March showed an increased Labour lead with Labour on 50%, the Conservatives on 38%, the Green Party and SDP on 4%, Liberal Democrats on 3% and Independents at 1%, while polls in the Daily Telegraph and the Daily Mail put the Labour lead at 20% and 25% respectively. Charles Prior responded to poor polls by issuing a warning that a Labour win in the by-election would damage the Pound. Labour leader Neil Kinnock visited the campaign in Lichfield on 16 March, forecasting victory which he said would be a notice to quit for Thatcher.

The Guardian reporter Ian Aitken found the Liberal Democrat campaign a 'pale shadow' of those run by its former campaign director Andy Ellis. However the party held off Labour to retain a local council seat in Western Springs ward, part of Rugeley, on 14 March. A poll by Mori for The Times published on 19 March showed that the poll tax was identified by 88% of voters as one of the three most important issues. The only other issues scoring significantly were mortgage and interest rates and the National Health Service, which each had 31%. Voting intentions were Labour 55%, Conservatives 29%, Liberal Democrats 9%, Green Party 3%, SDP 2% and Others 2%.

=== Budget reaction ===
A protest meeting was organised in the constituency by Staffordshire Police Federation on 19 March, to protest at changes to police housing allowances which they accused the Government of having imposed despite an agreement to abide by arbitration; the organisers invited Labour police spokesperson Barry Sheerman. The Budget, two days before polling day, announced help to poll tax rebates and was praised by Charles Prior as "a highly responsible yet imaginative Budget". However Prior's relaxed manner in the last week of the campaign was taken by The Times correspondent as an indication that he knew the election was lost and hoped instead to regain the seat at the following general election. The Guardian's Patrick Wintour thought that one of Prior's faults was being too nice, and too rarely giving "the impression of a man willing to go for the jugular".

As the campaign ended Sylvia Heal allowed herself to be "somewhat optimistic" and concentrated on appealing to their supporters against complacency. The party claimed its canvass had shown more than 50% support, and Roy Hattersley appealed for a resounding Labour victory to force changes in the poll tax.

== Result ==
Shortly after voting ended, two exit polls conducted for broadcasters found that Labour was on course for victory. Harris, for ITN, gave Labour 50%, Conservatives 32% and Liberal Democrats 11%, while NOP for the BBC found Labour on 51%, the Conservatives 32% and the Liberal Democrats 10%. Labour were so confident of winning that a champagne celebration was held for the benefit of news photographers who would have deadlines long before the result was declared. It was 3:30 AM before the Returning Officer announced the actual result.

Election	Political result	Candidate	Party	Votes	%	±%
1990 Mid Staffordshire by-election Death of previous MP; Electorate: 77,728; Turnout: 77.5% (-1.9)	Labour Gain; Majority: 9,449 (16.8%)	Sylvia Heal	Labour	27,649	49.1	+24.4
1990 Mid Staffordshire by-election Death of previous MP; Electorate: 77,728; Turnout: 77.5% (-1.9)	Labour Gain; Majority: 9,449 (16.8%)	Charles Prior	Conservative	18,200	32.3	-18.3
1990 Mid Staffordshire by-election Death of previous MP; Electorate: 77,728; Turnout: 77.5% (-1.9)	Labour Gain; Majority: 9,449 (16.8%)	Timothy Jones	Liberal Democrats	6,315	11.2	-12.0
1990 Mid Staffordshire by-election Death of previous MP; Electorate: 77,728; Turnout: 77.5% (-1.9)	Labour Gain; Majority: 9,449 (16.8%)	Ian Wood	SDP	1,422	2.5	N/A
1990 Mid Staffordshire by-election Death of previous MP; Electorate: 77,728; Turnout: 77.5% (-1.9)	Labour Gain; Majority: 9,449 (16.8%)	Robert Saunders	Green	1,215	2.2	N/A
1990 Mid Staffordshire by-election Death of previous MP; Electorate: 77,728; Turnout: 77.5% (-1.9)	Labour Gain; Majority: 9,449 (16.8%)	James Bazeley	Anti-Thatcher Conservative	547	1.0	N/A
1990 Mid Staffordshire by-election Death of previous MP; Electorate: 77,728; Turnout: 77.5% (-1.9)	Labour Gain; Majority: 9,449 (16.8%)	Screaming Lord Sutch	Monster Raving Loony	336	0.6	N/A
1990 Mid Staffordshire by-election Death of previous MP; Electorate: 77,728; Turnout: 77.5% (-1.9)	Labour Gain; Majority: 9,449 (16.8%)	John Hill	National Front	311	0.6	N/A
1990 Mid Staffordshire by-election Death of previous MP; Electorate: 77,728; Turnout: 77.5% (-1.9)	Labour Gain; Majority: 9,449 (16.8%)	Christopher Abell	NHS Supporters Party	102	0.2	N/A
1990 Mid Staffordshire by-election Death of previous MP; Electorate: 77,728; Turnout: 77.5% (-1.9)	Labour Gain; Majority: 9,449 (16.8%)	Nicholas Parker-Jervis	Against Immigration Conservative Green	71	0.1	N/A
1990 Mid Staffordshire by-election Death of previous MP; Electorate: 77,728; Turnout: 77.5% (-1.9)	Labour Gain; Majority: 9,449 (16.8%)	Stuart Hughes	Raving Loony Green Giant	59	0.1	N/A
1990 Mid Staffordshire by-election Death of previous MP; Electorate: 77,728; Turnout: 77.5% (-1.9)	Labour Gain; Majority: 9,449 (16.8%)	Lindi St Clair	National Independent Correct Edification	51	0.1	N/A
1990 Mid Staffordshire by-election Death of previous MP; Electorate: 77,728; Turnout: 77.5% (-1.9)	Labour Gain; Majority: 9,449 (16.8%)	Bernard Mildwater	Save the 2CV	42	0.1	N/A
1990 Mid Staffordshire by-election Death of previous MP; Electorate: 77,728; Turnout: 77.5% (-1.9)	Labour Gain; Majority: 9,449 (16.8%)	David Black	Christian Patriotic Alliance - Save Britain Campaign	39	0.1	N/A

== Aftermath ==
The result was reported as a "spectacular defeat" for Thatcher, and renewed speculation about whether there would be an attempt by Conservative MPs to remove her. Indeed, after her victory, Sylvia Heal declared that the "dark age of Thatcherism is drawing to a close". The result would prove to be the second of seven Conservative by-election losses in the 1987-1992 Parliament, but all would be regained by the Party in 1992.

== See also ==
- Lists of United Kingdom by-elections
