= Pierrepont School =

Pierrepont School is the name of several educational institutions.

== United Kingdom ==
- Pierrepont School, Frensham

== United States ==
- Pierrepont School (Westport, CT)
- Pierrepont School (Rutherford, NJ)
