= Sylvia Heal =

British politician

Dame Sylvia Heal DBE

Deputy Speaker of the House of Commons First Deputy Chairman of Ways and Means
- In office 23 October 2000 – 12 April 2010
- Speaker: Michael Martin; John Bercow
- Preceded by: Michael Martin
- Succeeded by: Nigel Evans

Member of Parliament for Halesowen and Rowley Regis
- In office 1 May 1997 – 12 April 2010
- Preceded by: Constituency Created
- Succeeded by: James Morris

Member of Parliament for Mid Staffordshire
- In office 22 March 1990 – 16 March 1992
- Preceded by: John Heddle
- Succeeded by: Michael Fabricant

Personal details
- Born: Sylvia Lloyd Fox; 20 July 1942 (age 84) Shotton, Wales
- Party: Labour
- Spouse: Keith Heal
- Relations: Ann Keen, Alan Keen
- Education: Swansea University

Dame Sylvia Lloyd Heal DBE (née Fox; born 20 July 1942) is a British Labour Party politician who was the Member of Parliament (MP) for Halesowen and Rowley Regis from 1997 to 2010, having previously been the MP for Mid Staffordshire from 1990 to 1992. She served as the First Deputy Chairman of Ways and Means and a Deputy Speaker of the House of Commons from 2000 until she stood down from Parliament in 2010.

== Early life ==
Born in Hawarden, Flintshire in north-east Wales, the daughter of Shotton steelworker John Lloyd-Fox and Ruby Hughes, she was educated at the Elfed Secondary Modern School (now Elfed High School) on Mill Lane in Buckley, the Coleg Harlech, and at Swansea University, where she was awarded a BSc in Economics in 1968.

She worked as a medical records clerk at the Chester Royal Infirmary for six years from 1957. In 1968 she was appointed as a social worker with the Department of Employment for two years. For ten years from 1980 she worked as a social worker within a drug rehabilitation centre. During her parliamentary interregnum she worked as a young carers officer with the National Carers Association from 1992 to 1997.

== Parliamentary career ==
She was a member of the Young Socialists National Council for four years from 1960, and was appointed as a Justice of the Peace in 1973. She was first elected to the House of Commons at the Mid Staffordshire by-election on 22 March 1990, which followed the suicide of the sitting Conservative MP John Heddle. She won the seat with a majority of 9,449 on a massive 21% swing from Conservative to Labour in a contest that was fought largely on the single issue of the Poll Tax. She lost the Mid Staffordshire seat two years later at the 1992 general election when she was ousted by the Conservative Michael Fabricant by a majority of 6,236. She was re-elected to Parliament at the 1997 general election for the new West Midlands seat of Halesowen and Rowley Regis with a majority of 10,337 and remained the MP in the 2001 and 2005 general elections.

In her first spell in Parliament she served for two years as a member of the education select committee. She was also promoted to the front bench by Neil Kinnock in 1991 as a spokeswoman for health and women. Following her re-election in 1997 she was appointed as the Parliamentary Private Secretary to the Secretary of State for Defence George Robertson and from 1999 his successor Geoff Hoon. She was appointed as a Deputy Speaker of the House in 2000, in which capacity she remained until her retirement from politics.

Sylvia Heal announced on 9 March 2010 that she would be stepping down at the 2010 general election, and was succeeded by Conservative James Morris as MP.

She was appointed Dame Commander of the Order of the British Empire (DBE) in the 2022 New Year Honours for political and public service.

== Personal life ==
Heal is the sister of Ann Keen, who was a Labour MP from 1997 to 2010, and sister-in-law to Alan Keen, who was a Labour MP from 1992 until his death in 2011. She lives in Egham, Surrey, and she takes a keen interest in South Africa and enjoys gardening.

== Electoral history ==
=== Local elections ===
Runnymede District Council Election 7 June 1973: Foxhills
Party	Candidate	Votes	%	±%
Conservative	B. Jarvis	873	57.6	New
Conservative	G. Tollett	817		
Conservative	J. Walbridge	773		
Liberal	C. Boyde	399	26.3	New
Labour	Sylvia Heal	243	16.0	New
Labour	John Pierce	180		
Majority		474	31.3	
Turnout			43.1	
Conservative win (new seat)				
Conservative win (new seat)				
Conservative win (new seat)				

Runnymede District Council Election 6 May 1976: Egham
Party	Candidate	Votes	%	±%
Conservative	R. Elliott	1,262	50.2	
Conservative	R. Try	1,120		
Conservative	A. Collins	1,076		
Independent	S. Oliver	552	22.0	
Labour	Sylvia Heal	442	17.6	
Labour	Joyce Capper	442		
Labour	Rhys Price Jones	348		
Liberal	M. Brooks	255	10.2	
Majority		710	28.3	
Turnout			56.1	
Conservative win (new seat)				
Conservative win (new seat)				
Conservative win (new seat)				

=== Parliamentary elections ===
Mid Staffordshire parliamentary by-election, 22 March 1990
Party	Candidate	Votes	%	±%
Labour	Sylvia Heal	27,649	50.2	+24.4
Conservative	Charles Prior	18,200	32.3	−18.3
Liberal Democrats	Timothy Jones	6,315	11.2	−12.0
SDP	Ian Wood	1,422	2.5	New
Green	Robert Saunders	1,215	2.2	New
Ind. Conservative	James Bazeley	547	1.0	New
Monster Raving Loony	Screaming Lord Sutch	336	0.6	New
National Front	John Hill	311	0.6	New
NHS Supporters Party	Christopher Abell	102	0.2	New
Independent	Nicholas Parker-Jenkins	71	0.1	New
Raving Loony Green Giant	Stuart Hughes	59	0.1	New
Independent	Lindi St Clair	51	0.1	New
Independent	Bernard Mildwater	42	0.1	New
Christian Patriotic Alliance	David Black	39	0.1	New
Majority		9,449	16.8	
Turnout		56,359	77.5	−1.9
Labour gain from Conservative		Swing	+21.4	

General election 1992: Mid Staffordshire
Party	Candidate	Votes	%	±%
Conservative	Michael Fabricant	31,227	49.7	−0.9
Labour	Sylvia Heal	24,991	39.8	+15.1
Liberal Democrats	BJ Stamp	6,402	10.2	−13.0
Natural Law	D Grice	239	0.4	New
Majority		6,236	9.9	−16.0
Turnout		62,859	85.6	+6.2
Conservative hold		Swing	−8.0	

General election 1997: Halesowen and Rowley Regis
Party	Candidate	Votes	%	±%
Labour	Sylvia Heal	26,366	54.1	
Conservative	John Kennedy	16,029	32.9	
Liberal Democrats	Elaine Todd	4,169	8.5	
Referendum	Alan White	1,244	2.6	
National Democrats	Karen Meads	592	1.2	
Green	Tim Weller	361	0.7	
Majority		10,337	21.2	
Turnout		48,761	73.6	
Labour win (new seat)				

General election 2001: Halesowen and Rowley Regis
Party	Candidate	Votes	%	±%
Labour	Sylvia Heal	20,804	53.0	−1.1
Conservative	Leslie Jones	13,445	34.2	+1.3
Liberal Democrats	Patrick Harley	4,089	10.4	+1.9
UKIP	Alan Sheath	936	2.4	New
Majority		7,359	18.8	−2.4
Turnout		39,274	59.8	−13.8
Labour hold		Swing	-1.2	

General election 2005: Halesowen and Rowley Regis
Party	Candidate	Votes	%	±%
Labour	Sylvia Heal	19,243	46.6	−6.4
Conservative	Leslie Jones	14,906	36.1	+1.9
Liberal Democrats	Martin Turner	5,204	12.6	+2.2
UKIP	Nikki Sinclaire	1,974	4.8	+2.4
Majority		4,337	10.5	−10.3
Turnout		41,327	62.9	+3.1
Labour hold		Swing	-4.2	

== Publication ==
- Couldn't Care More: Study of Young Carers and their Needs by Jenny Frank, foreword by Sylvia Heal, 1995, The Children's Society ISBN 0-907324-96-7

Parliament of the United Kingdom
Preceded by John Heddle	Member of Parliament for Mid Staffordshire; 1990–1992	Succeeded by Michael Fabricant
New constituency	Member of Parliament for Halesowen and Rowley Regis; 1997–2010	Succeeded by James Morris
Preceded by Michael Martin	First Deputy Chairman of Ways and Means; 2000–2010	Succeeded by Nigel Evans
