= Local Capital Finance Company =

- Company type: Quango
- Key people: Merrick Cockell (Chairman)
- Services: Loans to local authorities

The Local Capital Finance Company is a United Kingdom-based quango and private company that provides loans to local authorities. It is an alternative for local authorities to borrowing via the Public Works Loan Board of the UK Debt Management Office, which in turn is part of UK Governments HM Treasury.

== History ==
The official reason for the creation of the Local Capital Finance Company is that it increases competition and diversifies funding sources for local authorities, giving them greater independence. The company aims to deliver the larger, more liquid bond issues in response to capital market demand. It also provides a centre of expertise between local authorities and capital markets. On the other hand, there are fears that it is a means by which the British government can pretend that government debt is lower than it actually is. While all local government debt, whether sourced from the UK Debt Management Office or the open market, is included within measures of government debt, the force of the criticism is that by the nature of sovereign debt, no private issuer can have a lower risk premium than the sovereign issuer for the jurisdiction of the debt issued.

Municipal bond agencies have a proven track record in other countries internationally. In countries such as Sweden and Finland they have arguably improved local government financing.

As of February 2015, nearly 50 local authorities have signed up to the Local Capital Finance Company.

== Structure ==
The chairman of the LCF is Sir Merrick Cockell, who was previously head of the Local Government Association; its deputy chairman is Adrian Bell, head of Debt Markets UK for Canaccord Genuity in London;, its chief executive is Aidan Brady, who was previously a chief operating officer at Deutsche Bank, an investment bank and its Interim Chief Risk Officer is Markus Krebsz.
