= Halesowen and Rowley Regis =

UK Parliament constituency (1997–2024)

- Former borough constituency for the House of Commons
- 2010–2024 boundary of Halesowen and Rowley Regis in West Midlands

- Location of West Midlands within England
- County: West Midlands
- Electorate: 67,656 (December 2010)
- Major settlements: Blackheath, Cradley Heath, Halesowen

1997–2024
- Seats: One
- Created from: Halesowen & Stourbridge, Warley West
- Replaced by: Halesowen; West Bromwich (minor part); Smethwick (minor part)

Halesowen and Rowley Regis was a House of Commons constituency (Note: A borough constituency (for the purposes of election expenses and type of returning officer)) in the West Midlands represented in the UK Parliament from 1997 until 2024. (Note: As with all constituencies, the constituency elected one Member of Parliament (MP) by the first past the post system of election at least every five years.)

By the decision of the 2023 Periodic Review of Westminster constituencies, the seat was abolished and replaced by the new Halesowen constituency with similar boundaries except for Rowley Regis and Blackheath transferred to the new seats of West Bromwich and Smethwick respectively. All new seats were contested for the first time at the 2024 general election.

== Members of Parliament ==
Election	Member	Party
1997	Sylvia Heal	Labour
2010	James Morris	Conservative
2024	Constituency abolished	

== Boundaries ==
Map of boundaries 2010–2024

Halesowen and Rowley Regis straddled the borders of Dudley and Sandwell. (Note: Adding to the three seats in each of the two boroughs) It covered the south-east part of the Metropolitan Borough of Dudley.

1997–2010: The Metropolitan Borough of Dudley wards of Belle Vale and Hasbury, Halesowen North, Halesowen South, and Hayley Green, and the Metropolitan Borough of Sandwell wards of Blackheath, Cradley Heath and Old Hill, and Rowley.

2010–2024: The Metropolitan Borough of Dudley wards of Belle Vale, Halesowen North, Halesowen South, and Hayley Green and Cradley South, and the Metropolitan Borough of Sandwell wards of Blackheath, Cradley Heath and Old Hill, and Rowley.

== History ==
The constituency was formed for the 1997 general election, taking in the eastern part of the former Halesowen and Stourbridge constituency (Note: The western part recreated the Stourbridge seat) and the western part of the former Warley West seat. Halesowen and Stourbridge had been held by a Conservative but Labour candidates took its two replacements in 1997. (Note: Warley West in 1997 remained held by Labour Party)

The area formerly in the Halesowen and Stourbridge constituency is in the Dudley borough, while the area formerly in Warley West is within the Sandwell borough (which in turn had formed part of the boroughs of Warley and originally Rowley Regis).

From 1997 until she stood down before the 2010 general election, the seat's MP was Sylvia Heal of the Labour Party. Heal held Mid Staffordshire from a 1990 by-election until she was defeated by the Conservatives in 1992. On becoming the MP for Halesowen and Rowley Regis, she gained more than half of the votes in 1997 and 2001, before her popularity dipped slightly in 2005, still managing to hold on to the constituency comfortably.

James Morris of the Conservative Party won the seat in the 2010 general election. With approximately half of the constituency situated within Sandwell borough, it was the first time that any part of the borough had been represented by a Conservative MP since its creation in 1974. Morris was voted by the local party as Conservative candidate for the seat after previous candidate Nigel Hastilow stepped down in November 2007 following a public outcry over his claims that Enoch Powell's Rivers of Blood speech had been proven correct.

== Election results 1997–2024 ==
=== Elections in the 1990s ===
General election 1997: Halesowen and Rowley Regis
Party	Candidate	Votes	%	±%
Labour	Sylvia Heal	26,366	54.1	
Conservative	John Kennedy	16,029	32.9	
Liberal Democrats	Elaine Todd	4,169	8.5	
Referendum	Alan White	1,244	2.6	
National Democrats	Karen Meads	592	1.2	
Green	Tim Weller	361	0.7	
Majority		10,337	21.2	
Turnout		48,761	73.6	
Labour win (new seat)				

=== Elections in the 2000s ===
General election 2001: Halesowen and Rowley Regis
Party	Candidate	Votes	%	±%
Labour	Sylvia Heal	20,804	53.0	▼1.1
Conservative	Leslie Jones	13,445	34.2	▲1.3
Liberal Democrats	Patrick Harley	4,089	10.4	▲1.9
UKIP	Alan Sheath	936	2.4	New
Majority		7,359	18.8	▼2.4
Turnout		39,274	59.8	▼13.8
Labour hold		Swing		

General election 2005: Halesowen and Rowley Regis
Party	Candidate	Votes	%	±%
Labour	Sylvia Heal	19,243	46.6	▼6.4
Conservative	Leslie Jones	14,906	36.1	▲1.9
Liberal Democrats	Martin Turner	5,204	12.6	▲2.2
UKIP	Nikki Sinclaire	1,974	4.8	▲2.4
Majority		4,337	10.5	▼10.3
Turnout		41,327	62.9	▲3.1
Labour hold		Swing	▼4.2	

=== Elections in the 2010s ===
General election 2010: Halesowen and Rowley Regis
Party	Candidate	Votes	%	±%
Conservative	James Morris	18,115	41.2	▲4.6
Labour	Sue Hayman	16,092	36.6	▼9.7
Liberal Democrats	Philip Tibbetts	6,515	14.8	▲2.3
UKIP	Derek Baddeley	2,824	6.4	▲1.7
Independent	Derek Thompson	433	1.0	New
Majority		2,023	4.6	N/A
Turnout		43,979	69.0	▲5.9
Conservative gain from Labour		Swing	▲7.1	

General election 2015: Halesowen and Rowley Regis
Party	Candidate	Votes	%	±%
Conservative	James Morris	18,933	43.2	▲2.0
Labour	Stephanie Peacock	15,851	36.2	▼0.4
UKIP	Dean Perks	7,280	16.6	▲10.2
Liberal Democrats	Peter Tyzack	905	2.1	▼12.7
Green	John Payne	849	1.9	New
Majority		3,082	7.0	▲2.4
Turnout		43,818	59.1	▼9.9
Conservative hold		Swing	▲1.2	

General election 2017: Halesowen and Rowley Regis
Party	Candidate	Votes	%	±%
Conservative	James Morris	23,012	51.9	▲8.7
Labour	Ian Cooper	17,759	40.0	▲3.8
UKIP	Stuart Henley	2,126	4.8	▼11.8
Liberal Democrats	Jamie Scott	859	1.9	▼0.2
Green	James Robertson	440	1.0	▼0.9
Independent	Tim Weller	183	0.4	New
Majority		5,253	11.9	▲4.9
Turnout		38,982	64.5	▲5.4
Conservative hold		Swing	▲2.4	

General election 2019: Halesowen and Rowley Regis
Party	Candidate	Votes	%	±%
Conservative	James Morris	25,607	60.5	▲8.6
Labour	Ian Cooper	13,533	32.0	▼8.1
Liberal Democrats	Ryan Priest	1,738	4.1	▲2.2
Green	James Windridge	934	2.2	▲1.2
Independent	Jon Cross	232	0.5	New
Independent	Ian Fleming	190	0.4	New
Independent	Tim Weller	111	0.3	▼0.2
Majority		12,074	28.5	▲16.6
Turnout		42,345	62.0	▼2.5
Conservative hold		Swing	▲8.35	

== See also ==
- List of parliamentary constituencies in the West Midlands (county)

== Sources ==
- BBC (2005). Election 2005 – Halesowen & Rowley Regis. Retrieved May 9, 2005.
