= Michael Fabricant =

British politician (born 1950)

Sir Michael Fabricant
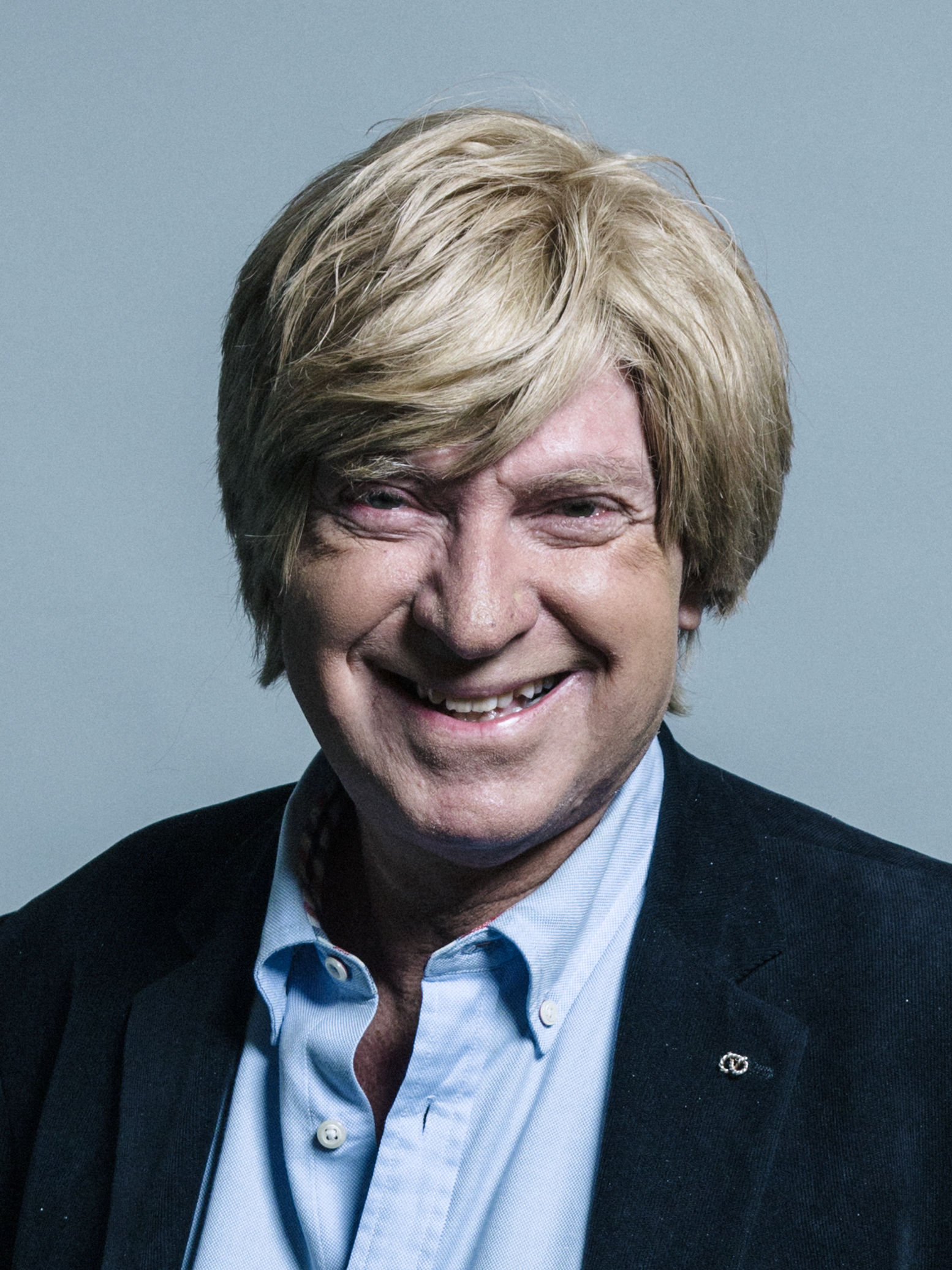
- Official portrait, 2017

Lord Commissioner of the Treasury
- In office 11 May 2010 – 4 September 2012
- Prime Minister: David Cameron
- Preceded by: Bob Blizzard
- Succeeded by: Desmond Swayne

Member of Parliament for Lichfield Mid Staffordshire (1992–1997)
- In office 9 April 1992 – 30 May 2024
- Preceded by: Sylvia Heal
- Succeeded by: Dave Robertson

Personal details
- Born: Michael Louis David Fabricant; 12 June 1950 (age 76) Brighton, Sussex, England
- Party: Conservative
- Domestic partner: Andy Street (1990–present)
- Education: Brighton, Hove and Sussex Grammar School
- Alma mater: Loughborough University (BSc); University of Sussex (MSc)
- Website: www.michael.fabricant.mp.co.uk

Sir Michael Louis David Fabricant (born 12 June 1950) is a British politician. A member of the Conservative Party, he served as the Member of Parliament (MP) for Lichfield in Staffordshire, formerly Mid Staffordshire, from 1992 until his defeat in 2024.

Fabricant was the vice-chairman of the Conservative Party for parliamentary campaigning, responsible for the Conservative Campaign Headquarters strategy on marginal seats at the 2015 general election, as well as UK parliamentary by-elections. In April 2014, he was dismissed from this position over comments he had made about his colleague Maria Miller's resignation. Fabricant also served as Shadow Minister for Trade and Industry and then for Trade and Economic Affairs from 2003 to 2005, and as Opposition Whip from 2005 to 2010.

== Early life and career ==
Michael Louis David Fabricant was born on 12 June 1950 in Rottingdean, Brighton, into a Jewish family, to Helena (née Freed; 1911–2004) and Rabbi Isaac Fabricant (1906–1989), rabbi of the Brighton and Hove Synagogue.

Fabricant attended Brighton Secondary Technical School and Brighton, Hove and Sussex Grammar School. He studied economics at Loughborough University, receiving a Bachelor of Science degree. He went on to study at the University of Sussex, where he was awarded a master's degree in operations research in 1974, and undertook research at the University of Oxford, University of London, and the University of Southern California in economics and econometrics.

He was director and co-founder of an international broadcast manufacturing and management group for 11 years prior to his election to Parliament.

Fabricant was the Conservative candidate in South Shields at the 1987 general election, coming second with 25.7% of the vote behind the incumbent Labour MP David Clark. Fabricant was appointed the chairman of the Brighton Pavilion Conservative Association in 1990 and remained chairman until his election to the House of Commons.

== Parliamentary career ==
Fabricant was elected to Parliament at the 1992 general election as MP for Mid Staffordshire with 49.7% of the vote and a majority of 6,236. He made his maiden speech on 2 July 1992.

In Parliament, Fabricant joined the European Legislation Select Committee in 1992, and served on it until the 1997 general election. He joined the National Heritage Select Committee in 1993 and was a member of that committee until his appointment as the Parliamentary Private Secretary to the Financial Secretary to the Treasury Michael Jack in 1996.

Prior to the 1997 general election, Fabricant's constituency of Mid Staffordshire was abolished, and replaced with Lichfield. At the election, Fabricant was elected as MP for Lichfield with 42.9% of the vote and a majority of 238.

Following the Conservative defeat at the 1997 general election, Fabricant joined the Culture, Media and Sport Select Committee until moving to the Home Affairs Select Committee in 1999.

At the 2001 general election, Fabricant was re-elected as MP for Lichfield with an increased vote share of 49.1% and an increased majority of 4,426.

Fabricant rejoined the Culture, Media and Sport committee following the 2001 general election, and also at this time became the chairman of the Information Committee. He moved up to the opposition frontbench as a trade and industry spokesman under Michael Howard in 2003. Later in the year he was moved to the post of spokesman on economic affairs.

Fabricant was again re-elected at the 2005 general election, with a decreased vote share of 48.6% and an increased majority of 7,080.

He became an opposition whip following the 2005 general election and remained in the position following the appointment of new leader David Cameron. In 2008, Fabricant founded Conservative Friends of America.

Also in 2008, Fabricant took part in a series of adjournment debates on government funding for inland waterways, and called for heavy goods freight to move off Britain's roads and back onto the restored canal network.

At the 2010 general election, Fabricant was again re-elected, with an increased vote share of 54.4% and an increased majority of 17,683.

In November 2012, Fabricant published a pamphlet entitled "The Pact", which called for a political pact between UKIP and the Conservative Party, in exchange for an In/out EU referendum.

Fabricant was sacked as vice-chairman of the Conservative Party in April 2014 after he tweeted "about time" with regard to Maria Miller's resignation as cabinet minister. George Eaton of the New Statesman believed his sacking related to his threat to rebel over the HS2 rail development and was necessary to deter other potential Conservative rebels on the same issue. He opposes HS2 on the grounds of its financial and environmental cost.

At the 2015 general election, Fabricant was again re-elected, with an increased vote share of 55.2% and an increased majority of 18,189.

In a 2016 debate, Fabricant yelled "bollocks" over a discussion of the impacts of Brexit. He was expressing disagreement with the former justice minister Jonathan Djanogly's statement that UK law firms could lose £1.7 billion in earnings if the UK were to leave the European Union. In the 2016 EU Referendum campaign Fabricant said he would be voting to leave the EU. A staunch believer in free trade, he commented: "I think we are part of a global economy and that we will be far wealthier trading globally than the current situation".

Fabricant was again re-elected at the snap 2017 general election with an increased vote share of 63.6% and an increased majority of 18,581.

Fabricant wrote in The Guardian in November 2017 to rebut claims about him that had appeared on a Westminster dossier making assertions about the behaviour of Conservative MPs. He wrote that no one he had contacted, including lobby journalists and a former chief whip with an "elephantine memory", had previously heard the claim made against him of "inappropriate behaviour with a male journalist in a taxi".

In the House of Commons, he sat on the Administration Committee and previously sat on the Committee of Selection, the Finance and Services Committee, the Liaison Committee (Commons), the Culture, Media and Sport Committee, the Home Affairs Committee and the National Heritage Committee.

Fabricant attracted media attention for having an apartheid-era flag of South Africa on display on the mantelpiece of his parliamentary office. He responded that he had several flags on display from countries where his former company had clients in the 1980s. Asked in 2018 if he regretted working for what was effectively an arm of the apartheid state in South Africa, he replied: "There is so much we can all regret with hindsight" and said he did not condone what was going on at the time.

At the 2019 general election, Fabricant was again re-elected with an increased vote share of 64.5% and an increased majority of 23,638.

On 12 April 2022, Fabricant urged Boris Johnson to apologise after he was fined for a breach of Covid rules. Fabricant said: "I don't think at any time he thought he was breaking the law. I think that at the time he just thought like many teachers and nurses who after a very long shift would tend to go back to the staff room and have a quiet drink". The remark was criticised by official bodies representing teachers and nurses, who said they did no such thing, and Fabricant said he had not intended to cause offence.

Fabricant endorsed Penny Mordaunt during the July–September 2022 Conservative Party leadership election. He was knighted in Johnson's resignation honours.

In March 2024, Fabricant was re-selected as the Conservative candidate for Lichfield at the 2024 general election, in which he lost his seat.

== Use of social media ==
In June 2014, Fabricant came under criticism when, following an exchange between Yasmin Alibhai-Brown and Rod Liddle on Channel 4 News the evening before, he tweeted that he "could never appear" on a discussion programme with her, as he "would either end up with a brain haemorrhage or by punching her in the throat." Gloria De Piero, then Shadow Secretary of State for Women and Equalities, described the tweet as "utterly appalling" while a Conservative Party spokesman commented that the MP's comment was "completely unacceptable". Fabricant subsequently apologised, but Alibhai-Brown thought his apology was "useless". A few days later, Fabricant wrote that he was "still deeply embarrassed and ashamed" and his tweet "appeared to have undone" his socially liberal voting record over the last 20 years.

In August 2014, after Sayeeda Warsi resigned from David Cameron's government over its policy towards Israel's Operation Protective Edge, Fabricant was criticised for a Twitter remark that appeared to suggest Gaza was a "Muslim issue". He subsequently clarified that he believed that Gaza was a humanitarian issue and that his comment about Warsi's "strong views on Muslim issues" was more general.

In May 2018, Fabricant called a teenage constituent a 'complete twat' on Twitter after she had questioned his commitment to working in part of the constituency. Fabricant criticised the constituent for not being clearer in detailing who she was and stated that he thought the post came from a 'Russian troll'.

In July 2018, Fabricant was accused of being Islamophobic over a subsequently-deleted tweet he shared depicting London mayor Sadiq Khan, who is a Muslim, in a sex act with a pig. Some Labour MPs called for Fabricant's suspension and former Conservative Party chairman Sayeeda Warsi responded, describing Islamophobia in the Conservative party as "widespread". Fabricant said he had been distracted in a meeting when he sent it and did not spot what the image actually showed.

In May 2021, Fabricant was accused by Hope not Hate of racism, after he tweeted that pro-Palestinian protesters in London were "primitives" that are "trying to bring to London what they do in the Middle East". Fabricant subsequently deleted the tweet, stating that "attacks on the British police as shown in the video are disgraceful". The Conservative party was asked by The Guardian for comment but declined.

In March 2022, Fabricant commented on social media that a proposed bill outlawing cyberflashing should include an exemption for dating apps. This was criticised by local councillor Joanne Grange.

In May 2022 Fabricant commented in relation to the arrest of an anonymous Conservative MP for rape, tweeting: "I am expecting a strong turnout of Conservative MPs at PMQs today, not only to demonstrate their strong support for Boris! BUT also to prove they are NOT the one told by the Chief Whip to stay at home. I'll be there!" The tweet was described by Labour Deputy Leader Angela Rayner as "grotesque". Fabricant said: "No-one is making light of rape or assault. Far from it. But those who want to read something into a comment will contrive to do so whatever. They are professional offence takers." Fabricant deleted his original tweet just over two hours later.

== Media work ==
Fabricant was political adviser to the 1995 BBC drama series The Final Cut and made a cameo appearance in the broadcast. During Prime Minister's Question Time on 13 September 2017, the prime minister, Theresa May, said that Fabricant would be appearing on the Channel 4 series Celebrity First Dates. She asked: "What I'm not sure about is whether my honourable friend is the celebrity or the first date". Nearly two months later, at the beginning of November 2017, Fabricant came out as bisexual on the show. In April 2025, Fabricant entered the Celebrity Big Brother house to appear as a housemate on the twenty-fourth series and was the first contestant to be voted out.

== Personal life ==
Fabricant lives in London and Lichfield. He co-owns a holiday home in Snowdonia with his partner Andy Street, the former Mayor of the West Midlands. Fabricant, who in December 2021 described Street as his 'life partner', is bisexual.

In 2015 Fabricant was diagnosed with skin cancer and prostate cancer, undergoing a prostatectomy as treatment for the latter. He spoke of his treatment for prostate cancer in the House of Commons the following year, highlighting the shortage of specialist prostate cancer nurses in the National Health Service (NHS). Then Labour Party leader Jeremy Corbyn responded to Fabricant's illness by stating he hoped "the treatment he got is the same treatment everyone else got". Following criticism, Corbyn apologised for his remarks.

Fabricant's blond hair has been the subject of speculation, with some people suggesting he wears a wig. He has stated his hair is a personal matter, and has refused to confirm whether it is his natural hair or a wig while reiterating this stance, most recently in his 2025 appearance on Celebrity Big Brother.

== Honours ==
Fabricant was appointed a Knight Bachelor on 9 June 2023 as part of the 2022 Prime Minister's Resignation Honours.

Parliament of the United Kingdom
Preceded by Sylvia Heal	Member of Parliament for Mid Staffordshire; 1992–1997	Constituency abolished
New constituency	Member of Parliament for Lichfield; 1997–2024	Succeeded by Dave Robertson
