= Whom the gods would destroy, they first make mad =

Long-standing maxim

Whom the gods would destroy, they first make mad is a saying that has appeared in English literature in varying forms since the 17th century. In some variations, "gods" is replaced with "God" or "Jupiter," and the saying is sometimes rendered in Latin: Quos Deus / Quem Iuppiter vult perdere, prius dementat. Although sometimes falsely attributed to Euripides, the phrase does have classical Greek antecedents.

The saying first appears in English in exactly the above form in the Reverend William Anderson Scott's book Daniel, a Model for Young Men (1854) and is attributed to a "heathen proverb." It later appears in Henry Wadsworth Longfellow's poem "The Masque of Pandora" (1875) and other places.

== Classical origins ==
An early precedent appears in verses 620–623 of Sophocles' play Antigone: τὸ κακὸν δοκεῖν ποτ᾽ ἐσθλὸν τῷδ᾽ ἔμμεν' ὅτῳ φρένας θεὸς ἄγει πρὸς ἄταν; translated "Evil seems good to him whose mind the god is driving towards disaster".

Plato's Republic (380a) quotes a fragment attributed to Aeschylus (but otherwise unattested): θεὸς μὲν αἰτίαν φύει βροτοῖς, / ὅταν κακῶσαι δῶμα παμπήδην θέλῃ; translated "A god implants the guilty cause in men / When he would utterly destroy a house."

== 17th- and 18th-century use ==
In the 17th century the phrase was used in the neo-Latin form Quem Iuppiter vult perdere, dementat prius (Whom Jupiter would ruin, he first makes mad); in a Christianized Greek version, iuppiter was replaced by "lord" as in μωραίνει Κύριος ον βούλεται απολέσαι. Benjamin Franklin quotes this phrase in his essay "On Civil War", delivered to the printer of the London Public Advertiser, August 25, 1768.

A prior Latin version is Quos Deus vult perdere, prius dementat (Life of Samuel Johnson, 1791) but this involves a single God, not "the gods".

Jean-Jacques Rousseau quotes this phrase in The Confessions in the form of Quos vult perdere Jupiter dementet (Whom Jupiter destroys, he first makes mad), authored in 1769 but published in 1782.

== 20th-century use ==
A version of the phrase ("those whom the gods wish to destroy, they first make mad") was used by Enoch Powell in his 1968 Rivers of Blood speech.

== See also ==
The dictionary definition of the road to hell is paved with good intentions at Wiktionary
