= Mid Staffordshire =

UK Parliament constituency (1983–1997)

- Former county constituency for the House of Commons
- County: Staffordshire
- Major settlements: Lichfield, Rugeley, Stone

1983–1997
- Seats: one
- Created from: Lichfield & Tamworth, Stafford & Stone and Cannock
- Replaced by: Lichfield, Stone, Cannock Chase, Stafford

Mid Staffordshire was a parliamentary constituency in the United Kingdom from 1983 until 1997.

It covered a swathe of territory across the centre of Staffordshire, stretching from Lichfield and Rugeley in the south to Stone in the north.

At the 1983 general election, the seat was won by John Heddle of the Conservative Party, who had previously represented the Lichfield and Tamworth constituency. Heddle held the seat at the 1987 general election.

Following Heddle's suicide in December 1989, a by-election followed on 22 March 1990. The by-election attracted a blaze of publicity, and a large number of candidates (14), as it took place at the height of the public dissatisfaction with the Conservative government over the Community Charge or poll tax (indeed, the notorious poll tax riots took place only days after the by-election). Sylvia Heal of the Labour Party was victorious in the by-election; however she failed to retain the seat at the 1992 general election, losing to the Conservatives' Michael Fabricant.

In 1997, a review by the Boundary Commission reorganised the constituencies in Staffordshire, and Mid Staffordshire was abolished. It was replaced by parts of four constituencies: mostly by the Lichfield and Stone constituencies, apart from Rugeley which was included in Cannock Chase, and the area around the village of Great Haywood which was covered by the Stafford constituency. Michael Fabricant became MP for Lichfield at the 1997 general election.

== Boundaries ==
The District of Lichfield wards of Armitage with Handsacre, Central, Chadsmead, Colton and Ridwares, Curborough, King's Bromley, Longdon, Leomansley, St John's, and Stowe, the Borough of Stafford wards of Barlaston, Chartley, Fulford, Haywood, Milwich, Oulton, St Michael's, and Stonefield and Christchurch, and the District of Cannock Chase wards of Brereton and Ravenhill, Brindley Heath, Etching Hill, Hagley, and Western Springs.

== Members of Parliament ==
Election	Member	Party	Notes
1983	John Heddle	Conservative	Previously MP for Lichfield and Tamworth from 1979; died in office December 1989
1990 by-election	Sylvia Heal	Labour	Subsequently MP for Halesowen and Rowley Regis 1997–2010 and a Deputy Speaker of the House of Commons 2000–2010
1992	Michael Fabricant	Conservative	Subsequently MP for Lichfield since 1997
1997	constituency abolished		

== Elections ==
=== Elections in the 1980s ===
General election 1983: Mid Staffordshire
Party	Candidate	Votes	%	±%
Conservative	John Heddle	27,210	52.1	
Liberal	Timothy Jones	13,330	25.5	
Labour	Peter Lane	11,720	22.4	
Majority		13,880	26.6	
Turnout		52,260	77.5	
Conservative win (new seat)				

General election 1987: Mid Staffordshire
Party	Candidate	Votes	%	±%
Conservative	John Heddle	28,644	50.6	−1.5
Labour	Crispin St. Hill	13,990	24.7	+2.3
Liberal	Timothy Jones	13,114	23.2	−2.3
Ind. Conservative	James Bazeley	836	1.5	New
Majority		14,654	25.9	−0.7
Turnout		56,584	79.4	+1.9
Conservative hold		Swing		

=== Elections in the 1990s ===
By-election 1990: Mid Staffordshire
Party	Candidate	Votes	%	±%
Labour	Sylvia Heal	27,649	49.1	+24.4
Conservative	Charles Prior	18,200	32.3	−18.3
Liberal Democrats	Timothy Jones	6,315	11.2	−12.0
SDP	Ian Wood	1,422	2.5	New
Green	Robert Saunders	1,215	2.2	New
Anti-Thatcher Conservative	James Bazeley	547	1.0	New
Monster Raving Loony	Screaming Lord Sutch	336	0.6	New
National Front	John Hill	311	0.5	New
NHS Supporters Party	Christopher Abell	102	0.2	New
Against Immigration Conservative Green	Nicholas Parker-Jervis	71	0.1	New
Raving Loony Green Giant Supercalafragalistic Party	Stuart Hughes	59	0.1	New
National Independent Correct Edification	Lindi St Clair	51	0.1	New
Independent 'Save the 2CV'	Bernard Mildwater	42	0.1	New
Christian Patriotic Alliance - Save Britain Campaign	David Black	39	0.1	New
Majority		9,449	16.8	N/A
Turnout		56,359	77.5	−1.9
Labour gain from Conservative		Swing	+21.0	

General election 1992: Mid Staffordshire
Party	Candidate	Votes	%	±%
Conservative	Michael Fabricant	31,227	49.7	−0.9
Labour	Sylvia Heal	24,991	39.8	+15.1
Liberal Democrats	BJ Stamp	6,402	10.2	−13.0
Natural Law	D Grice	239	0.4	New
Majority		6,236	9.9	−16.0
Turnout		62,859	85.6	+6.2
Conservative hold		Swing	−8.0	

== Sources ==
- United Kingdom Election Results
