= John Heddle =

British politician

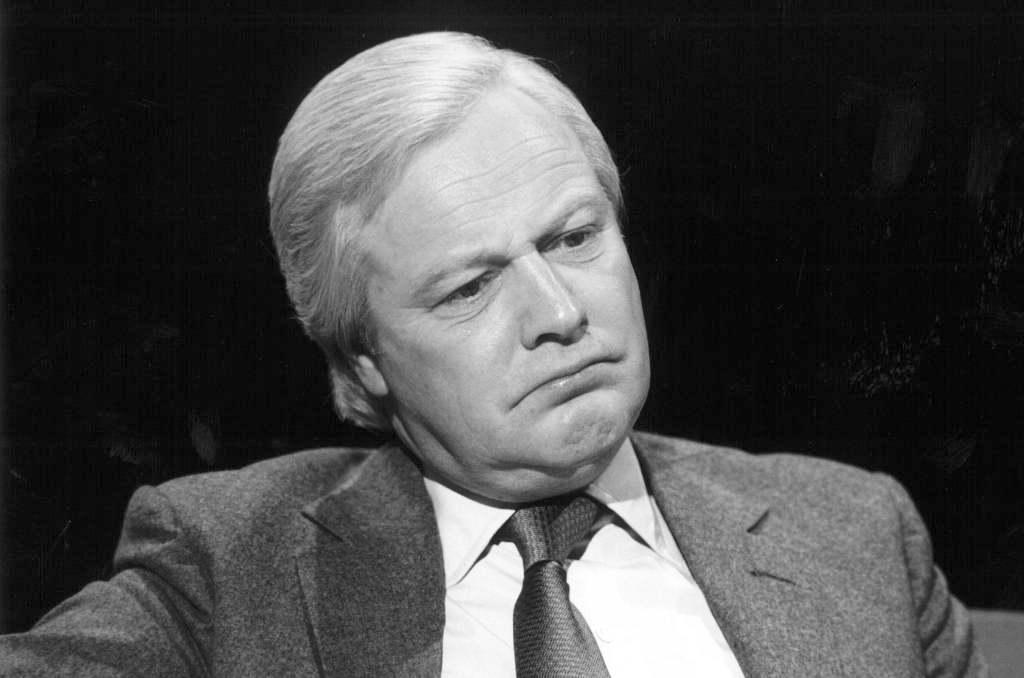
- On the television discussion programme After Dark, March 1988 – "No Place Like Home"

Member of Parliament for Mid Staffordshire Lichfield and Tamworth (1979–1983)
- In office 3 May 1979 – 19 December 1989
- Preceded by: Bruce Grocott
- Succeeded by: Sylvia Heal

Personal details
- Born: Bentley John Heddle; 15 September 1943
- Died: 19 December 1989 (aged 46) near Chartham, Kent, England
- Party: Conservative

Bentley John Heddle (15 September 1943 – 19 December 1989) was a British Conservative Party politician.

== Political career ==
Heddle contested Gateshead West in February 1974, being beaten by Labour's John Horam. In October 1974 he stood in Bolton East, but was again defeated.

He was Member of Parliament for Lichfield and Tamworth from 1979 to 1983, and for Mid Staffordshire from 1983.

== Death ==
Early on 19 December 1989, Heddle was found dead in his car in a chalk pit near Chartham in Kent. A hose was found connected to the car's exhaust pipe. The death was ruled a suicide; he reportedly killed himself owing to the debts of his property businesses. The subsequent by-election was won by Labour's Sylvia Heal.

Parliament of the United Kingdom
Preceded by Bruce Grocott	Member of Parliament for Lichfield and Tamworth; 1979–1983	Constituency abolished
New constituency	Member of Parliament for Mid Staffordshire; 1983–1989	Succeeded by Sylvia Heal
