= Lesley Collier =

English ballerina and teacher of dance

Lesley Collier CBE
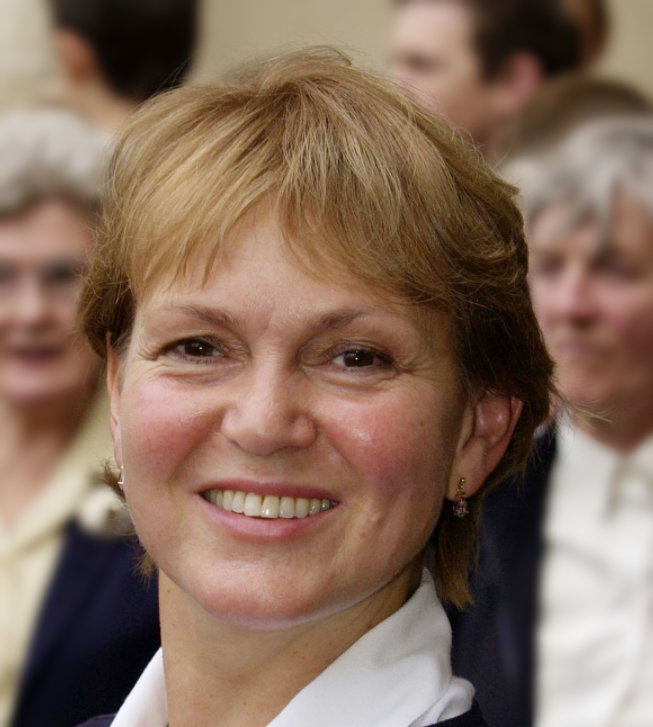
- Born: Lesley Faye Collier; 13 March 1947 (age 78); Orpington, England
- Occupation(s): Dancer and dance teacher
- Years active: 1965–present

Lesley Faye Collier CBE (born 13 March 1947) is an English ballerina and teacher of dance. In 1972 she became a principal dancer of the Royal Ballet. In 1995 she left the company and began to teach at the Royal Ballet School. She is a rèpetiteur at the Royal Ballet.

== Early life ==
Born at Orpington in Kent to Roy Collier and Mavis (née Head), Collier began dancing at the age of two and won a scholarship to attend the Royal Ballet School. In 1965 she completed her years at the school and for her graduation performance danced the leading role in Frederick Ashton's The Two Pigeons.

== Dancing career ==
Upon leaving the Royal Ballet School in 1965, Collier joined the Royal Ballet. In 1968 she was given her first solo roles. She went on to perform in all of the important classical ballets, and in 1972 became a principal dancer.

On 13 November 1978 Collier danced with Wayne Sleep in a Royal Variety Performance at the London Palladium.

In 1981 The Ballet Goer's Guide called her "a dancer of sparkling technique and speed".

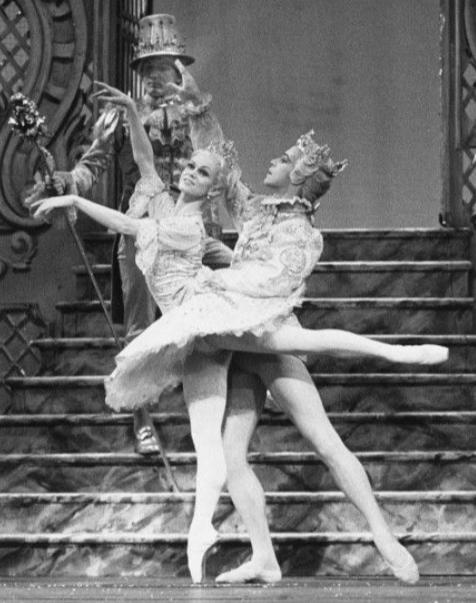

During her dance career Collier played leading roles in the ballets Giselle, La fille mal gardée, Anastasia, Romeo and Juliet, Mayerling and Cinderella. She also played the lead in Tchaikovsky's The Sleeping Beauty, The Nutcracker and Swan Lake.

== Subsequent career ==
After retiring in 1995 she joined the teaching staff of the Royal Ballet School.

== Family ==
In 1977 in Westminster, Collier married Nicholas Dromgoole, once headmaster of Pierepont House School, and latterly ballet correspondent of The Times.

== On DVD ==
- Great Pas de Deux (NVC Arts/Warner Music Group, 1997): dancing The Nutcracker with Anthony Dowell
- 'La Fille Mal Gardee' DVD 1981 with Michael Coleman Royal Ballet Covent Garden Arranged by John Lanchbery
