= 1976 Runnymede District Council election =

1976 English local election

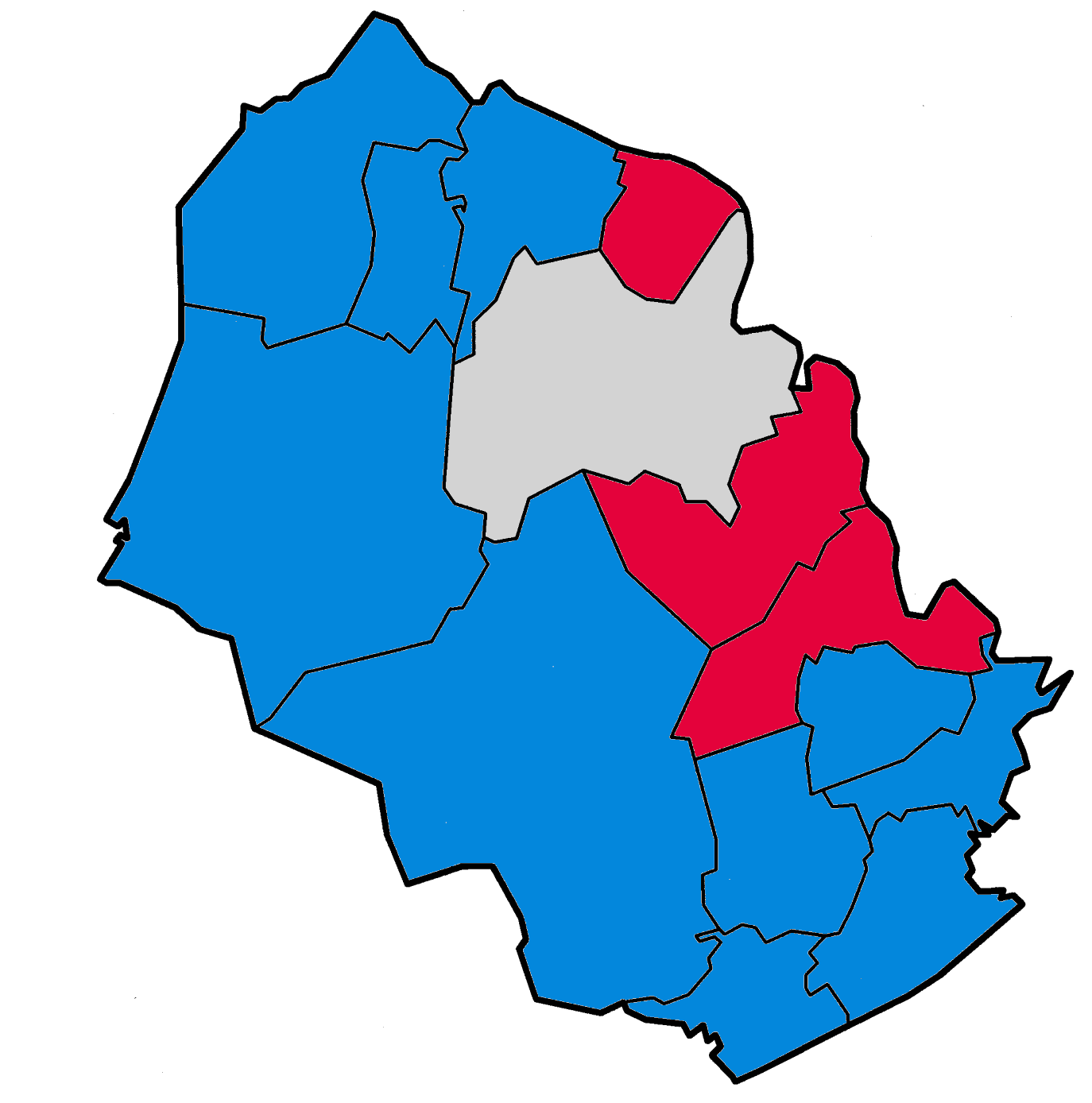
Map showing the parties of the candidates with the most votes in each ward.

Elections to Runnymede Council were held on 6 May 1976. The whole council was up for election with boundary changes since the last election in 1973. The Conservative Party retained overall control of the council and increased their majority to 31 out of 42 seats.

After the election, the composition of the council was:

- Conservative 31
- Labour 7
- Residents Association 3
- Liberal 1

== Election result ==
1976 Runnymede District Council election
Party	Candidates	Seats	Gains	Losses	Net gain/loss	Seats %	Votes %	Votes	+/−
Conservative	37	31			▲8	73.8	58.5	33,064	
Labour	26	7			▼8	16.7	25.7	14,516	
Residents	3	3			▲1	7.1	5.8	3,266	
Liberal	14	1			▲1	2.4	9.1	5,150	
Independent	1	0			0	0.0	1.0	552	

== Ward results ==
Addlestone Bourneside
Party	Candidate	Votes	%	±%
Conservative	S. Brunger	652	45.7	
Conservative	A. Read	644		
Conservative	P. Quaife	635		
Labour	Les Taylor	533	37.3	
Labour	George Honeyball	520		
Labour	Geoff Tucker	519		
Liberal	M. Beal	243	17.0	
Liberal	B. Cain	231		
Liberal	H. Fotheringham	213		
Majority		119	8.3	
Turnout			34.0	
Conservative win (new seat)				
Conservative win (new seat)				
Conservative win (new seat)				

Addlestone North
Party	Candidate	Votes	%	±%
Conservative	A. Birchall	752	52.0	
Conservative	R. Taylor	729		
Conservative	Ann Widdecombe	695		
Labour	S. Allen	401	27.7	
Labour	T. Finn	399		
Labour	Joyce Keene	388		
Liberal	Geoffrey Pyle	294	20.3	
Majority		328	24.3	
Turnout			38.4	
Conservative win (new seat)				
Conservative win (new seat)				
Conservative win (new seat)				

Addlestone St. Paul's
Party	Candidate	Votes	%	±%
Conservative	M. Cunningham	809	42.4	
Liberal	K. Lloyd	798	41.8	
Conservative	D. Tuckwood	790		
Conservative	G. Quaife	774		
Liberal	A. Brentnall	572		
Liberal	D. Hopwood	555		
Labour	Cyril Watts	301	15.8	
Majority		11	0.6	
Turnout			50.1	
Conservative win (new seat)				
Liberal win (new seat)				
Conservative win (new seat)				

Chertsey Meads
Party	Candidate	Votes	%	±%
Labour	Ray Lowther	1,352	44.6	
Conservative	W. Collett	1,255	41.4	
Conservative	D. Wyke	1,226		
Conservative	G. Paris	1,166		
Labour	B. Harris	894		
Labour	Anthony Anderson	832		
Liberal	R. Benfield	421	13.9	
Majority		97	3.2	
Turnout			60.2	
Labour win (new seat)				
Conservative win (new seat)				
Conservative win (new seat)				

Chertsey St. Ann's
Party	Candidate	Votes	%	±%
Labour	Gordon Light	699	43.5	
Labour	D. Hughes	655		
Labour	Ronald Plamer	642		
Conservative	B. Harmer	532	33.1	
Conservative	M. Anderson	525		
Conservative	J. Williams	508		
Liberal	J. Elfer	375	23.3	
Majority		167	10.4	
Turnout			46.1	
Labour win (new seat)				
Labour win (new seat)				
Labour win (new seat)				

Egham
Party	Candidate	Votes	%	±%
Conservative	R. Elliott	1,262	50.2	
Conservative	R. Try	1,120		
Conservative	A. Collins	1,076		
Independent	S. Oliver	552	22.0	
Labour	Sylvia Heal	442	17.6	
Labour	Joyce Capper	442		
Labour	Rhys Price Jones	348		
Liberal	M. Brooks	255	10.2	
Majority		710	28.3	
Turnout			56.1	
Conservative win (new seat)				
Conservative win (new seat)				
Conservative win (new seat)				

Englefield Green East
Party	Candidate	Votes	%	±%
Conservative	P. Barry	1,100	78.6	
Conservative	C. Clarke	1,062		
Conservative	D. Head	1,047		
Labour	John Hawkes	300	21.4	
Majority		800	57.1	
Turnout			44.4	
Conservative win (new seat)				
Conservative win (new seat)				
Conservative win (new seat)				

Englefield Green West
Party	Candidate	Votes	%	±%
Conservative	J. Ellison	761	49.9	
Conservative	R. Thompson	733		
Conservative	R. Wykeham	717		
Labour	L. Dick Carey	569	37.3	
Labour	Joan Holder	505		
Labour	Tom Reddy	505		
Liberal	S. Thatcher	195	12.8	
Liberal	P. Deane	193		
Majority		192	12.6	
Turnout			44.4	
Conservative win (new seat)				
Conservative win (new seat)				
Conservative win (new seat)				

Foxhills
Party	Candidate	Votes	%	±%
Conservative	B. Jarvis	1,018	67.7	
Conservative	G. Tollett	934		
Conservative	J. Walbridge	788		
Liberal	C. Boyde	486	32.3	
Majority		532	35.4	
Turnout			44.5	
Conservative win (new seat)				
Conservative win (new seat)				
Conservative win (new seat)				

Hythe
Party	Candidate	Votes	%	±%
Labour	K. Capper	813	60.0	
Labour	E. Austin	808		
Labour	D. Terry Baker	801		
Conservative	M. Fox	541	40.0	
Majority		272	20.1	
Turnout			27.2	
Labour win (new seat)				
Labour win (new seat)				
Labour win (new seat)				

New Haw
Party	Candidate	Votes	%	±%
Conservative	A. Blowers	1,032	48.6	
Conservative	J. Weedon	875		
Conservative	D. Clarke	801		
Liberal	J. Graham	621	29.3	
Labour	Joyce Taylor	469	22.1	
Majority		411	19.4	
Turnout			58.5	
Conservative win (new seat)				
Conservative win (new seat)				
Conservative win (new seat)				

Thorpe
Party	Candidate	Votes	%	±%
Residents	J. Smith	1,168	63.2	
Residents	A. Wreglesworth	1,066		
Residents	Eiry Price	1,032		
Labour	A. Sandey	233	16.6	
Majority		935	66.7	
Turnout			40.8	
Residents win (new seat)				
Residents win (new seat)				
Residents win (new seat)				

Virginia Water
Party	Candidate	Votes	%	±%
Conservative	F. Passmore	1,181	89.1	
Conservative	J. Allen	1,168		
Conservative	R. Hervey	1,141		
Labour	Norah Williams	145	10.9	
Majority		1,036	78.1	
Turnout			36.0	
Conservative win (new seat)				
Conservative win (new seat)				
Conservative win (new seat)				

Woodham
Party	Candidate	Votes	%	±%
Conservative	P. Hicks	1,027	67.4	
Conservative	M. Heard	1,002		
Conservative	E. Hargreaves	986		
Liberal	R. Morrall	496	32.6	
Majority		531	34.9	
Turnout			39.8	
Conservative win (new seat)				
Conservative win (new seat)				
Conservative win (new seat)				
