= Rivers of Blood speech =

1968 speech by the British politician Enoch Powell

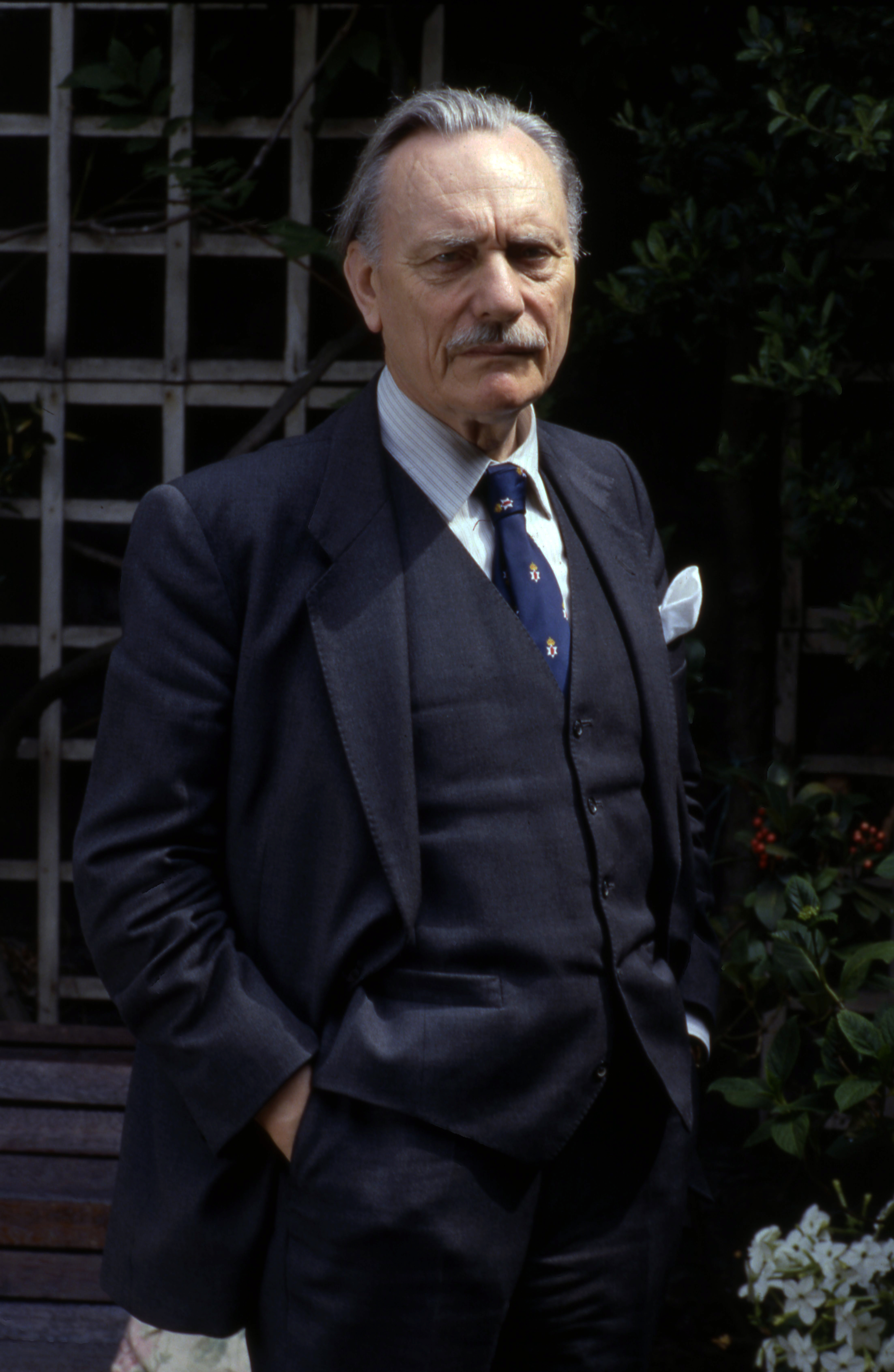
Powell in 1987

The "Rivers of Blood" speech was made by the British politician Enoch Powell on 20 April 1968 to a meeting of the Conservative Political Centre in Birmingham. In it, Powell, who was then Shadow Secretary of State for Defence in the Shadow Cabinet of Edward Heath, strongly criticised the rates of immigration from the Commonwealth of Nations (mostly former colonies of the British Empire) to the United Kingdom since the Second World War. He also opposed the Race Relations Bill, an anti-discrimination bill which upon receiving royal assent as the Race Relations Act 1968 criminalised the refusal of housing, employment, or public services to persons on the grounds of colour, race, or ethnic or national origin. Powell himself called it "the Birmingham speech"; "Rivers of Blood" alludes to a prophecy from Virgil's Aeneid that Powell (a classical scholar) quoted:

As I look ahead, I am filled with foreboding; like the Roman, I seem to see 'the River Tiber foaming with much blood'.

The speech was a national controversy, and it made Powell one of the most talked-about and divisive politicians in Britain. Heath, the leader of the Conservative Party at the time, dismissed him from the Shadow Cabinet the day after the speech. According to most accounts the popularity of Powell's views on immigration might have been a decisive factor in the Conservative Party's unexpected victory at the 1970 general election, although he became one of the most persistent opponents of the subsequent Heath ministry.

== Background ==
Powell, the member of Parliament (MP) for Wolverhampton South West and Shadow Secretary of State for Defence for the Conservative Party, was addressing the general meeting of the West Midlands Area Conservative Political Centre. The Labour government's 1968 Race Relations Bill was to have its second reading three days later, and the Conservative Opposition had tabled an amendment significantly weakening its provisions. The bill was a successor to the Race Relations Act 1965.

The Birmingham-based television company ATV saw an advance copy of the speech on the Saturday morning, and its news editor ordered a television crew to go to the venue, where they filmed sections of the speech. Earlier in the week, Powell had said to his friend Clem Jones, a journalist and then editor at the Wolverhampton Express & Star, "I'm going to make a speech at the weekend and it's going to go up 'fizz' like a rocket; but whereas all rockets fall to the earth, this one is going to stay up."

In preparing his speech, Powell had applied Jones's advice that to make hard-hitting political speeches and short-circuit interference from his party organisation, his best timing was on Saturday afternoons, after delivering embargoed copies the previous Thursday or Friday to selected editors and political journalists of Sunday newspapers. This tactic could ensure coverage of the speech over three days through Saturday evening bulletins, then Sunday newspapers, thus the coverage would be picked up in Monday newspapers.

Powell's critics suspected he fabricated some of his stories. In later years, the veracity of elements of the speech – namely, within the story about the widow – have been questioned, with the Express & Star claiming evidence suggests "the most controversial speech in post-war British politics was a web of lies, involving a vulnerable, mentally-ill woman, Druscilla "Trudy" Cotterill".

== Speech ==
In the speech, Powell recounted a conversation with one of his constituents, a middle-aged working man, a few weeks earlier. Powell said that the man told him: "If I had the money to go, I wouldn't stay in this country... I have three children, all of them been through grammar school and two of them married now, with family. I shan't be satisfied till I have seen them all settled overseas." The man finished by saying to Powell: "In this country in 15 or 20 years' time the black man will have the whip hand over the white man".

Powell said:

I can already hear the chorus of execration. How dare I say such a horrible thing? How dare I stir up trouble and inflame feelings by repeating such a conversation? The answer is that I do not have the right not to do so. Here is a decent, ordinary fellow Englishman, who in broad daylight in my own town says to me, his Member of Parliament, that the country will not be worth living in for his children. I simply do not have the right to shrug my shoulders and think about something else. What he is saying, thousands and hundreds of thousands are saying and thinking—not throughout Great Britain, perhaps, but in the areas that are already undergoing the total transformation to which there is no parallel in a thousand years of English history. Those whom the gods wish to destroy, they first make mad. We must be mad, literally mad, as a nation to be permitting the annual inflow of some 50,000 dependents, who are for the most part the material of the future growth of the immigrant descended population. It is like watching a nation busily engaged in heaping up its own funeral pyre. So insane are we that we actually permit unmarried persons to immigrate for the purpose of founding a family with spouses and fiancées whom they have never seen.

Powell quoted a letter he received from a woman in Northumberland, about an elderly woman living on a Wolverhampton street where she was the only white resident. The woman's husband and two sons had died in the Second World War and she had rented out the rooms in her house. Once immigrants had moved into the street in which she lived, her white lodgers left. Two black men had knocked on her door at 7:00 am to use her telephone to call their employers, but she refused, as she would have done to any other stranger knocking at her door at such an hour, and was subsequently verbally abused. The woman had asked her local authority for a rates reduction, but was told by a council officer to let out the rooms of her house. When the woman said the only tenants would be black, the council officer replied: "Racial prejudice won't get you anywhere in this country."

Powell advocated voluntary re-emigration by "generous grants and assistance" and he mentioned that immigrants had asked him whether it was possible. He said that all citizens should be equal before the law, and that:

This does not mean that the immigrant and his descendants should be elevated into a privileged or special class or that the citizen should be denied his right to discriminate in the management of his own affairs between one fellow-citizen and another or that he should be subjected to an inquisition as to his reasons and motives for behaving in one lawful manner rather than another.

He argued that journalists who urged the government to pass anti-discrimination laws were "of the same kidney and sometimes on the same newspapers which year after year in the 1930s tried to blind this country to the rising peril which confronted it". Powell described what he perceived to be the evolving position of the White British population:

For reasons which they could not comprehend, and in pursuance of a decision by default, on which they were never consulted, they found themselves made strangers in their own country. They found their wives unable to obtain hospital beds in childbirth, their children unable to obtain school places, their homes and neighbourhoods changed beyond recognition, their plans and prospects for the future defeated; at work they found that employers hesitated to apply to the immigrant worker the standards of discipline and competence required of the native-born worker; they began to hear, as time went by, more and more voices which told them that they were now the unwanted. On top of this, they now learn that a one-way privilege is to be established by Act of Parliament; a law which cannot, and is not intended to, operate to protect them or redress their grievances, is to be enacted to give the stranger, the disgruntled and the agent provocateur the power to pillory them for their private actions.

Powell warned that if the legislation proposed for the then–Race Relations Bill were to be passed it would bring about discrimination against the native population:

The discrimination and the deprivation, the sense of alarm and of resentment, lies not with the immigrant population but with those among whom they have come and are still coming. This is why to enact legislation of the kind before parliament at this moment is to risk throwing a match on to gunpowder.

Powell was concerned about the current level of immigration and argued that it must be controlled:

In these circumstances nothing will suffice but that the total inflow for settlement should be reduced at once to negligible proportions, and that the necessary legislative and administrative measures be taken without delay.

Powell argued that he felt that although "many thousands" of immigrants wanted to integrate, he felt that the majority did not, and that some had vested interests in fostering racial and religious differences "with a view to the exercise of actual domination, first over fellow-immigrants and then over the rest of the population". Powell's peroration of the speech gave rise to its popular title. He quotes the Sibyl's prophecy in the epic poem Aeneid, 6, 86–87, of "Terrible war, and the river Tiber foaming / With streams of blood".

As I look ahead, I am filled with foreboding. Like the Roman, I seem to see "the River Tiber foaming with much blood". That tragic and intractable phenomenon which we watch with horror on the other side of the Atlantic but which there is interwoven with the history and existence of the States itself, is coming upon us here by our own volition and our own neglect. Indeed, it has all but come. In numerical terms, it will be of American proportions long before the end of the century. Only resolute and urgent action will avert it even now. Whether there will be the public will to demand and obtain that action, I do not know. All I know is that to see, and not to speak, would be the great betrayal.

== Reaction ==
=== Political ===
According to C. Howard Wheeldon, who was present at the meeting in which Powell gave the speech, "it is fascinating to note what little hostility emerged from the audience. To the best of my memory, only one person voiced any sign of annoyance." The day after the speech, Powell went to Sunday Communion at his local church, and when he emerged, there was a crowd of journalists, and a local plasterer said to Powell: "Well done, sir. It needed to be said." Powell asked the assembled journalists: "Have I really caused such a furore?" At midday, Powell went on the BBC's World This Weekend to defend his speech, and he appeared later that day on ITN news.

The Labour MP Ted Leadbitter said he would refer the speech to the Director of Public Prosecutions, and the Liberal Party leader Jeremy Thorpe spoke of a prima facie case against Powell for incitement. Lady Gaitskell called the speech "cowardly", and the West Indian cricketer Sir Learie Constantine condemned it.

The leading Conservatives in the Shadow Cabinet were outraged by the speech. Iain Macleod, Edward Boyle, Quintin Hogg and Robert Carr all threatened to resign from the front bench unless Powell was dismissed. Margaret Thatcher, who was then the Shadow Cabinet's Fuel and Power Spokesman, thought that some of Powell's speech was "strong meat", and said to the Conservative leader, Edward Heath when he telephoned her to inform her Powell was to be sacked: "I really thought that it was better to let things cool down for the present rather than heighten the crisis". Heath dismissed Powell from his post as Shadow Defence Secretary, telling him on the telephone that Sunday evening. They never spoke to each other again. Heath said of the speech in public that it was "racialist in tone and liable to exacerbate racial tensions". Conservative MPs on the right of the party—Duncan Sandys, Gerald Nabarro, Teddy Taylor—spoke against Powell's sacking. On 22 April 1968 Heath went on Panorama, telling Robin Day: "I dismissed Mr Powell because I believed his speech was inflammatory and liable to damage race relations. I am determined to do everything I can to prevent racial problems developing into civil strife ... I don't believe the great majority of the British people share Mr Powell's way of putting his views in his speech."

The Times declared it "an evil speech", stating "This is the first time that a serious British politician has appealed to racial hatred in this direct way in our postwar history." The Times went on to record incidents of racial attacks in the immediate aftermath of Powell's speech. One such incident, reported under the headline "Coloured family attacked", took place on 30 April 1968 in Wolverhampton itself: it involved a slashing incident with 14 white youths chanting "Powell" and "Why don't you go back to your own country?" at patrons of a West Indian christening party. One of the West Indian victims, Wade Crooks of Lower Villiers Street, was the child's grandfather. He had to have eight stitches over his left eye. He was reported as saying, "I have been here since 1955 and nothing like this has happened before. I am shattered." An opinion poll commissioned by the BBC television programme Panorama in December 1968 found that eight per cent of immigrants believed that they had been treated worse by white people since Powell's speech, 38 per cent would like to return to their country of origin if offered financial help, and 47 per cent supported immigration control, with 30 per cent opposed.

The speech generated much correspondence to newspapers, most markedly with the Express & Star in Wolverhampton itself, whose local sorting office over the following week received 40,000 postcards and 8,000 letters addressed to its local newspaper. Jones recalled:

Ted Heath made a martyr out of Enoch, but as far as Express & Star's circulation area was concerned, virtually the whole area was determined to make a saint out of him. From the Tuesday through to the end of the week, I had ten, fifteen to twenty bags full of readers' letters: 95 per cent of them were pro-Enoch.

At the end of that week there were two simultaneous processions in Wolverhampton, one of Powell's supporters and another of opponents, who each brought petitions to Jones outside his office, the two columns being kept apart by police.

On 23 April 1968 the Race Relations Bill had its second reading in the House of Commons. Many MPs referred or alluded to Powell's speech. For Labour, Paul Rose, Maurice Orbach, Reginald Paget, Dingle Foot, Ivor Richard and David Ennals were all critical. Among the Conservatives, Quintin Hogg and Nigel Fisher were critical, while Hugh Fraser, Ronald Bell, Dudley Smith and Harold Gurden were sympathetic. Powell was present for the debate but did not speak.

Earlier that day, 1,000 London dockers had gone on strike in protest of Powell's sacking and marched from the East End to the Palace of Westminster carrying placards with sayings such as "we want Enoch Powell!", "Enoch here, Enoch there, we want Enoch everywhere", "Don't knock Enoch" and "Back Britain, not Black Britain". Three hundred of them went into the palace, 100 to lobby the MP for Stepney, Peter Shore, and 200 to lobby the MP for Poplar, Ian Mikardo. Shore and Mikardo were shouted down and some dockers kicked Mikardo. Lady Gaitskell shouted: "You will have your remedy at the next election." The dockers replied: "We won't forget." The organiser of the strike, Harry Pearman, headed a delegation to meet Powell and said after: "I have just met Enoch Powell and it made me feel proud to be an Englishman. He told me that he felt that if this matter was swept under the rug he would lift the rug and do the same again. We are representatives of the working man. We are not racialists."

The first strikes in support of Powell were on 22 April, with fifty construction workers at Rugeley power station and fifty workers at the Metro-Cammell factory in Birmingham. Six hundred Smithfield meat porters struck and marched to Westminster and handed Powell a 92-page petition supporting him. Powell advised against strike action and asked them to write to Harold Wilson, Heath or their MP. However, strikes continued, particularly in the West Midlands and among London dockworkers,. By 27 April, 4,500 dockers were on strike. On 28 April, 1,500 people marched to Downing Street chanting "Arrest Enoch Powell". Powell said he had received 43,000 letters and 700 telegrams supporting him by early May, with 800 letters and four telegrams against. On 2 May, the attorney general, Sir Elwyn Jones, announced he would not prosecute Powell after consulting the Director of Public Prosecutions.

The Gallup Organization took an opinion poll at the end of April and found that 74 per cent agreed with what Powell had said in his speech; 15 per cent disagreed. 69 per cent felt Heath was wrong to sack Powell and 20 per cent believed Heath was right. Before his speech Powell was favoured to replace Heath as Conservative leader by one per cent, with Reginald Maudling favoured by 20 per cent; after his speech 24 per cent favoured Powell and 18 per cent Maudling. 83 per cent now felt immigration should be restricted (75 per cent before the speech) and 65 per cent favoured anti-discrimination legislation. Opinion polls showed broad disapproval for the pro-Powell strikes. According to George L. Bernstein, the speech made the British people think that Powell "was the first British politician who was actually listening to them".

Powell defended his speech on 4 May through an interview for the Birmingham Post: "What I would take 'racialist' to mean is a person who believes in the inherent inferiority of one race of mankind to another, and who acts and speaks in that belief. So the answer to the question of whether I am a racialist is 'no'—unless, perhaps, it is to be a racialist in reverse. I regard many of the peoples in India as being superior in many respects—intellectually, for example, and in other respects—to Europeans. Perhaps that is over-correcting." On 5 May the prime minister, Harold Wilson, made his first public statement on race and immigration since Powell's speech. He told Labour supporters at a May Day rally in Birmingham Town Hall:

I am not prepared to stand aside and see this country engulfed by the racial conflict which calculating orators or ignorant prejudice can create. Nor in the great world confrontation on race and colour, where this country must declare where it stands, am I prepared to be a neutral, whether that confrontation is in Birmingham or Bulawayo. In these issues there can be no neutrals and no escape from decision. For in the world of today, while political isolationism invites danger and economic isolationism invites bankruptcy, moral isolationism invites contempt.

In a speech to the Labour Party conference in Blackpool that October, Wilson said:

We are the party of human rights—the only party of human rights that will be speaking from this platform this month. (Loud applause.) The struggle against racialism is a worldwide fight. It is the dignity of man for which we are fighting. If what we assert is true for Birmingham, it is true for Bulawayo. If ever there were a condemnation of the values of the party which forms the Opposition it is the fact that the virus of Powellism has taken so firm a hold at every level.

Powell himself criticised the "Rivers of Blood" title attributed to the speech, which he claimed was the misappropriation of his words. Whilst defending the contents, he told a rally in Bristol that he only saw the "prospect of a bloody conflict". In his notes, he termed it "Speech in Birmingham".

During the 1970 general election the majority of the Parliamentary Labour Party did not wish to "stir up the Powell issue". However, the Labour MP Tony Benn said:

The flag of racialism which has been hoisted in Wolverhampton is beginning to look like the one that fluttered 25 years ago over Dachau and Belsen. If we do not speak up now against the filthy and obscene racialist propaganda ... the forces of hatred will mark up their first success and mobilise their first offensive. ... Enoch Powell has emerged as the real leader of the Conservative Party. He is a far stronger character than Mr. Heath. He speaks his mind; Heath does not. The final proof of Powell's power is that Heath dare not attack him publicly, even when he says things that disgust decent Conservatives.

According to most accounts, the popularity of Powell's perspective on immigration may have played a decisive contributory factor in the Conservatives' surprise victory in the 1970 general election, although Powell became one of the most persistent opponents of the subsequent Heath government. In "exhaustive research" on the election, the American pollster Douglas Schoen and the University of Oxford academic R. W. Johnson believed it "beyond dispute" that Powell had attracted 2.5 million votes to the Conservatives, but nationally the Conservative vote had increased by only 1.7 million since 1966. In his own constituency at that election—his last in Wolverhampton—his total vote of 26,220, majority of 14,467 and a 64.3 per cent share of the vote were then the highest of his career.

=== Powell's reflection on the speech ===
Powell reflected on the speech in an interview in 1977 when the interviewer asked him, "nine years after the speech, are we still in your view on a kind of funeral pyre?":

Yes, I've been guilty I suppose of, I've said this before, of under-estimating rather than over-estimating. And I was just looking back at the figures that I was then talking about in 1968 for the end of the century. Do you know my estimates which were regarded with such ridicule and denounced, behold the academics forgive me, they are less than the official estimate which the Franks reported at the beginning of this year are thought. So upon the whole I have leaned, perhaps it's a fault, towards the under-estimation of the magnitude and of the danger.

The interviewer then asked him, "what do you see as the likely prospect now? Still the 'River Tiber foaming with blood'?":

My prospect is that, politicians of all parties will say "Well Enoch Powell is right, we don't say that in public but we know it in private, Enoch Powell is right and it will no doubt develop as he says. But it's better for us to do nothing now, and let it happen perhaps after our time, than to seize the many poisonous nettles which we would have to seize if we were at this stage going to attempt to avert the outcome." So let it go on until a third of Central London, a third of Birmingham, Wolverhampton, are coloured, until the Civil War comes, let it go on. We won't be blamed, we'll either have gone or we'll slip out from under somehow.

=== Cultural ===
Polls in the 1960s and 1970s showed that Powell's views were popular among the British population at the time. A Gallup poll, for example, showed that 75% of the population were sympathetic to Powell's views. An NOP poll showed that approximately 75% of the British population agreed with Powell's demand for non-white immigration to be halted completely, and about 60% agreed with his call for the repatriation of non-whites already resident in Britain.

The Rivers of Blood speech has been blamed for leading to violent attacks against British Pakistanis and other British South Asians, which became frequent after the speech in 1968; however, there is "little agreement on the extent to which Powell was responsible for racial attacks". These "Paki-bashing" attacks later peaked during the 1970s and 1980s.

Powell was mentioned in early versions of the 1969 song "Get Back" by the Beatles. This early version of the song, known as the "No Pakistanis" version, parodied the anti-immigrant views of Enoch Powell.

On 5 August 1976 the musician Eric Clapton provoked an uproar and lingering controversy when he spoke out against increasing immigration during a concert in Birmingham. Visibly intoxicated, Clapton voiced his support of the controversial speech, and announced on stage that Britain was in danger of becoming a "black colony". Among other things, Clapton said "Keep Britain white!" which was at the time a National Front slogan.

In November 2010 the actor and comedian Sanjeev Bhaskar recalled the fear which the speech instilled in Britons of Indian origin: "At the end of the 1960s, Enoch Powell was quite a frightening figure to us. He was the one person who represented an enforced ticket out, so we always had suitcases that were ready and packed. My parents held the notion that we may have to leave."

While a section of the white population appeared to warm to Powell over the speech, the Guyanese-born author Mike Phillips recalls that it legitimised hostility, and even violence, towards black Britons like himself.

In his book The British Dream (2013), David Goodhart claims that Powell's speech in effect "put back by more than a generation a robust debate about the successes and failures of immigration".

Just when a discussion should have been starting about integration, racial justice, and distinguishing the reasonable from the racist complaints of the white people whose communities were being transformed, he polarised the argument and closed it down.

== Identity of the woman mentioned in the speech ==
There were attempts to locate the Wolverhampton constituent whom Powell described as being victimised by non-white residents. The editor of the local Wolverhampton newspaper the Express & Star, Clem Jones, claimed he was unable to identify the woman using the electoral roll and other sources.

Shortly after Powell's death Kenneth Nock, a Wolverhampton solicitor, wrote to the Express and Star in April 1998 to claim that his firm had acted for the woman in question, but that he could not name her owing to rules concerning client confidentiality. In January 2007 the BBC Radio 4 programme Document claimed to have uncovered the woman's identity. They said she was Druscilla Cotterill (1907–1978), the widow of Harry Cotterill, a battery quartermaster sergeant with the Royal Artillery who had been killed in the Second World War. She lived in Brighton Place in Wolverhampton, which by the 1960s had a larger proportion of immigrant families. In order to increase her income, she rented rooms to lodgers, but ceased to take in any more when the Race Relations Act 1968 prevented her from discriminating against certain lodgers on the basis of their race and nationality.

In 2008, Dr Simon Burgess, the researcher for the BBC documentary, said Powell was "dealing in trumped-up hearsay" about Cotterill being racially abused by her neighbours. Ferdinand Mount mentions details of the story that were incorrect: Cotterill had not had excrement pushed through her letterbox; she did not have children; and she got on quite well with her neighbours, babysitting their children. Further investigating, he says, also brought into question other elements of the account, such as whether it was likely Cotterill had a telephone; whether West Indian children could not speak English, or whether the only English word such children would know was "racialist".

== Support for the speech ==
In the United Kingdom, particularly in England, "Enoch [Powell] was right" is a phrase of political rhetoric, inviting comparison of aspects of current English society with the predictions made by Powell in the "Rivers of Blood" speech. The phrase implies criticism of racial quotas, immigration and multiculturalism. Badges, T-shirts and other items bearing the slogan have been produced at different times in the United Kingdom. Powell gained support from both right-wing and traditionally left-leaning, working-class voters for his anti-immigration stance.

Powell gained the support of the far-right in Britain. Badges, T-shirts and fridge magnets emblazoned with the slogan "Enoch was right" are regularly seen at far-right demonstrations, according to Vice News. Powell also has a presence on social media, with an Enoch Powell page on Facebook run by the far-right Traditional Britain Group which amassed several thousands of likes, and similar pages which post "racist memes and Daily Mail stories" have been equally successful, such as British nationalist and anti-immigration Britain First's Facebook page.

In The Trial of Enoch Powell, a Channel 4 television broadcast in April 1998, on the thirtieth anniversary of his Rivers of Blood speech (and two months after his death), 64 per cent of the studio audience voted that Powell was not a racist. Some in the Church of England, of which Powell had been a member, took a different view. Upon Powell's death, Barbados-born Wilfred Wood, then Bishop of Croydon, stated, "Enoch Powell gave a certificate of respectability to white racist views which otherwise decent people were ashamed to acknowledge".

In March 2016 the German historian Michael Stürmer wrote a retrospective pro-Powell piece in Die Welt, opining that nobody else had been "punished so mercilessly" by fellow party members and media for their viewpoints.

Trevor Phillips wrote in May 2016 in The Daily Telegraph: "Rome may not yet be in flames, but I think I can smell the smouldering whilst we hum to the music of liberal self-delusion" by ignoring the effects of mass immigration. He explicitly compared his warning to Powell's: "He too summoned up echoes of Rome with his reference to Virgil's dire premonition of the River Tiber 'foaming with much blood'". From the damage the reaction to the speech did to Powell's career, Phillips wrote, "Everyone in British public life learnt the lesson: adopt any strategy possible to avoid saying anything about race, ethnicity (and latterly religion and belief) that is not anodyne and platitudinous".

In October 2018 support for the speech was expressed by the Plymouth University Conservatives, who referenced the phrase "Enoch was Right" on one of the apparel worn for a society gathering.

In November 2022 the conservative political commentator Calvin Robinson, who is also a deacon for the Free Church of England, praised Powell's speech in an article for his blog.

In May 2026, Simon Heffer, the author of the Enoch Powell biography Like the Roman, published an article in The Spectator in support of the speech titled "It’s time to uncancel Enoch Powell".

== Acknowledgement from politicians ==
In an interview for Today shortly after her departure from office as prime minister in 1990, Margaret Thatcher said that Powell had "made a valid argument, if in sometimes regrettable terms".

Thirty years after the speech, Heath said that Powell's remarks on the "economic burden of immigration" had been "not without prescience".

The former Labour Party leader, Michael Foot, remarked to a reporter that it was "tragic" that this "outstanding personality" had been widely misunderstood as predicting actual bloodshed in Britain, when in fact he had used the Aeneid quotation merely to communicate his own sense of foreboding.

In November 2007 Nigel Hastilow resigned as the Conservative candidate for Halesowen and Rowley Regis after he wrote an article in the Wolverhampton Express & Star that included the statement: "Enoch, once MP for Wolverhampton South-West, was sacked from the Conservative front bench and marginalised politically for his 1968 'Rivers of Blood' speech, warning that uncontrolled immigration would change Britain irrevocably. He was right and immigration has changed the face of Britain dramatically."

In January 2014 the UK Independence Party leader Nigel Farage, after being told during an interview that a statement just read to him had come from Powell's speech, said: "Well what he was warning about was the large influx of people into an area, that change an area beyond recognition, there is tension – the basic principle is right." In June of that year, in response to the alleged Islamist Operation Trojan Horse, the Conservative peer and former minister Norman Tebbit wrote in The Daily Telegraph, "No one should have been surprised at what was going on in schools in Birmingham. It is precisely what I was talking about over 20 years ago and Enoch Powell was warning against long before that. We have imported far too many immigrants who have come here not to live in our society, but to replicate here the society of their homelands." The Conservative MP Gerald Howarth said on the same issue, "Clearly, the arrival of so many people of non-Christian faith has presented a challenge, as so many of us, including the late Enoch Powell, warned decades ago."

In April 2018 the leader of UKIP in Wales, Neil Hamilton, said that "the idea that Enoch Powell was some kind of uniquely racist villain is absolute nonsense". Hamilton said that Powell had been "proved right by events" in terms of social change if not violence. In response, the leader of Plaid Cymru, Leanne Wood, accused Hamilton of "keeping Powell's racist rhetoric going". The Labour AM Hefin David described Hamilton's comments as "outrageous".

In May 2025 following Reform UK's electoral success at the 2025 local elections, the prime minister, Keir Starmer, gave a press conference in which he promised a significant fall in net migration by the end of the Parliament, stating: "This plan means migration will fall – that's a promise." His line "we risk becoming an island of strangers" when discussing stricter immigration controls was criticised by media outlets and MP Zarah Sultana as echoing Powell's "strangers in their own country" line from the speech.

== Dramatic portrayals ==
The speech is the subject of a play, What Shadows, written by Chris Hannan. The play was staged in Birmingham from 27 October to 12 November 2016, with Powell portrayed by Ian McDiarmid and Jones by George Costigan.

The Speech, a novel by the author Andrew Smith set in Wolverhampton during the ten days before and after the speech and featuring Powell as a character, was published in October 2016 by Urbane Publications.

In April 2018 the BBC announced that Archive on 4 would transmit 50 Years On: Rivers of Blood, a programme marking the 50th anniversary of the speech. Ian McDiarmid would read the entire speech, the first time it would be broadcast on British radio, and it would be discussed and analysed. Several commentators criticised the BBC for this.

On New Year's Day 2023, Season 12 Episode 1 of Call the Midwife ('April 1968') aired, dealing with the aftermath and impact of the speech, including the 1968 dockworkers' strike.

== See also ==
- Criticism of multiculturalism
- Demographics of the United Kingdom
- Great Replacement
- Le bruit et l'odeur
- Protests of 1968
- Racism in the British Conservative Party
- Swamped by Asians speech by Australian Pauline Hanson
