= Merrick Cockell =

British politician (born 1957)

- Born: 16 June 1957 (age 69)
- Education: Pierrepont School, Frensham

Sir Merrick Richard Cockell (born 16 June 1957) is a Conservative politician in the United Kingdom, former Leader of the Royal Borough of Kensington and Chelsea and former chairman of the Local Government Association. He was made a Knight Bachelor in 2010.

== Early life ==
Cockell was born on 16 June 1957 to Peter Colvile Cockell and Hildegard Christina Cockell (née Kern). He was educated at Pierrepont School, Frensham.

== Career ==
Cockell became a trader with F. M. Barshall Ltd. From 1977 to 1982, he served the company overseas in Ghana, Togo, Sierra Leone, Gambia, and China. In 1982 he founded and became a director of Abingdon Cockell Ltd, an import-export company, remaining with it until 2006. He has served as a director of Localis, a local government think-tank, since 2008 and as its chairman since 2009. From 1999 he was also a director of Peter Barshall Ltd.

In 1990, as a director of the importers Barber Cockell, he was quoted in China Trade Report as saying "Everyone was shocked by events in June last year, but in reality what occurred in Tiananmen Square had little effect on our business even during the troubles."

More recently Sir Merrick joined PA Consulting Group as a senior advisor. The Local Government Chronicle reported on this move in 2014 with Sir Merrick quoting: "PA Consulting Group is at the forefront of breaking down barriers between the public and private sectors and encouraging new approaches to co-operation. Having been part of the ongoing transformation of local public services, I am looking forward to working with such an innovative organisation."

Sir Merrick was appointed deputy chairman of London Pensions Fund Authority in 2013 and made chairman in 2015. He was appointed executive chairman of Cratus Communications in 2014.

=== Politics ===
In 1986, Cockell was elected as a councillor of the Kensington and Chelsea London Borough Council, representing the Stanley ward, in which he was Chairman of Education 1992–1995, Conservative Chief Whip 1995–2000, and Leader of the Council 2000–2013.

He was deputy chairman of the Conservative Councillors' Association from 2005 to 2008 and its chairman from 2008, when he also was given a seat on the Conservative Party Board. and served as a member of the Audit Commission from 2009.

He was a member of the London Governance Commission from 2004 to 2006 and was Chairman of London Councils from 2006 to 2010.

In 2011 he became chairman of the Local Government Association, succeeding Baroness Eaton. He stood down on 8 July 2014.

In 2015 he became the first chairman of the UK Municipal Bonds Agency plc, a local government owned body that will issue bonds and other financial instruments to allow local authorities to borrow more competitively.

In August 2015, The mayor of London appointed Sir Merrick to be the chairman of the Crossrail 2 Growth Commission, which reported on the economic viability of the proposed rail route linking North East and South West suburbs under central London.

== Honours ==
Cockell was knighted in the Queen's Birthday Honours List, 2010, "for services to local government".

Political offices
Preceded by The Baroness Eaton	Chair of the Local Government Association; 2011–2014	Succeeded by The Lord Porter of Spalding
