= Pierrepont School, Frensham =

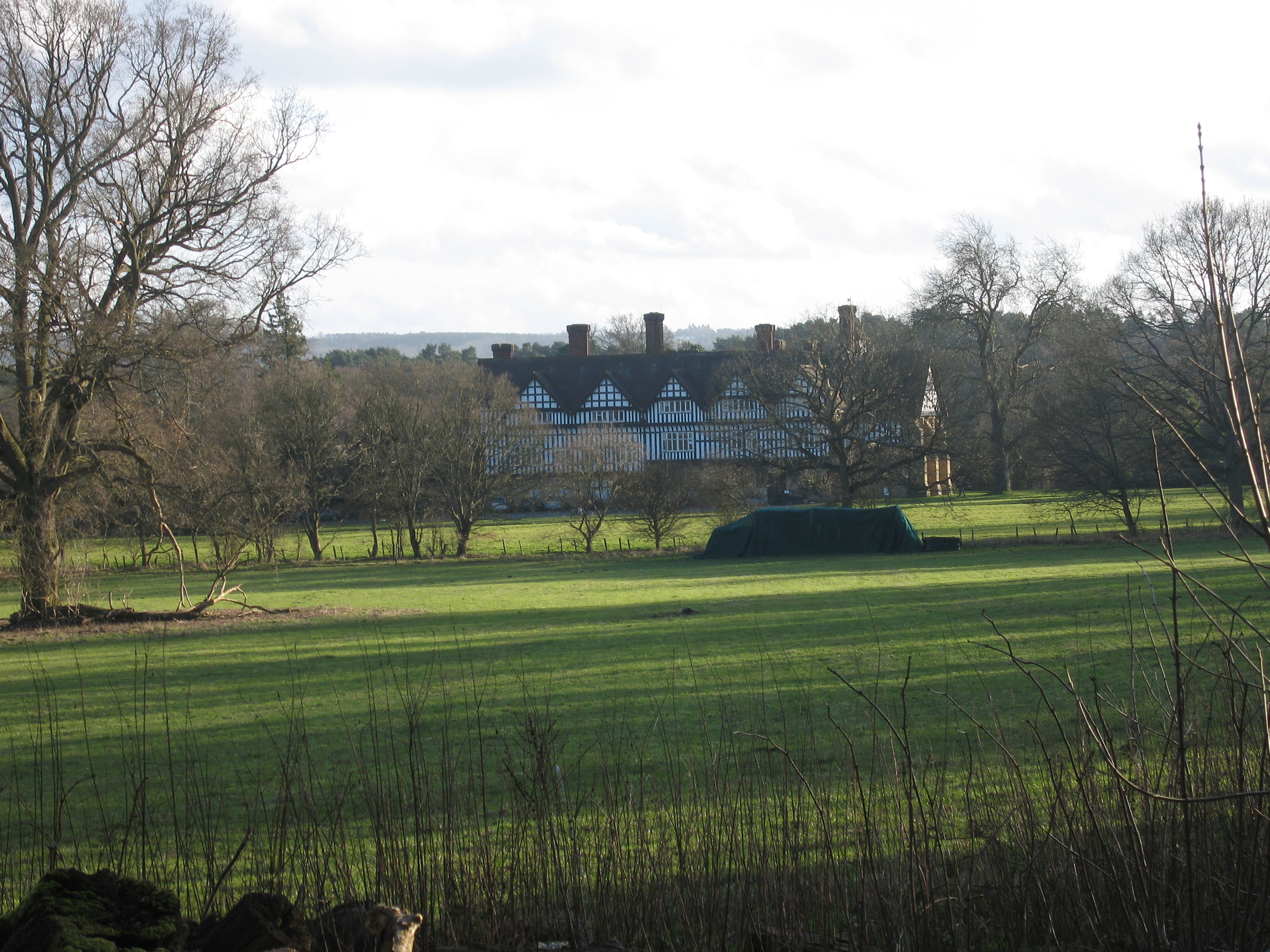

Location
- Frensham, Surrey, GU10 3DW; United Kingdom; 51°10′19″N 0°47′03″W

Information
- Type: Independent
- Motto: A posse ad esse (From possibility to actuality)
- Religious affiliation: Church of England
- Established: 1947
- Closed: 1993
- Gender: Boys, co-educational from 1970
- Former pupils: Old Pierrepontians

Pierrepont School, Frensham, originally known as Pierrepont House School, was a private school in Surrey, England, with day pupils as well as boarders. Founded in 1947 as a school for boys, it became co-educational in 1983 and closed in 1993.

== History ==
Pierrepont House School was founded in 1947 as an independent school for boys by its first headmaster, Thomas Joyce Parry. The following year Parry established a school Combined Cadet Force, with himself as its commanding officer, and became known in the school as 'Major Parry'. He had served in the British Army in both the 1st and 2nd World War. This distinguished him from his son Thomas Parry who joined the staff after returning to England in 1947 after serving in India as an officer in the 4th Battalion the 9th Gurkha Rifles. The CCF, or 'Corps', became the heart of the school's ethos. In 1970 the original Army section was joined by a Royal Air Force section and in 1983 by a Royal Navy section.

The school's main building was a 19th-century country house designed by the architect Richard Norman Shaw around an earlier house. In 1973 this was listed as Grade II*.

The school's aim for its boys – and for its girls from 1983 onwards – was to give them a good all-round education while developing character through sports and other outdoor activities, and its syllabus included adventure training, leadership, and personal survival. Like most British independent schools, it was divided into houses, all with names recalling military history: Agincourt, Trafalgar, and Waterloo. Day houses took the names of men associated with the school's architecture and design: initially there were two, Shaw and Combe Houses, and later a third day house, Birch, was added.

In the late 1980s the school ran into financial difficulties. In 1989 it took over St George's Preparatory School, Farnham, and at about the same time built a new craft, technology and design centre, but these added to its financial problems.

In the economic downturn of the 1990s, parental opinion lost confidence in the school's focus on character-building at the expense of academic studies.

The school closed in 1993. Pierrepont School Trust Limited, an educational charity connected with the school, was created in 1966 and dissolved in 1996.

The school's former premises were bought by Ellel Ministries International and became the home of the new Ellel Pierrepont Centre.

== Motto ==
The school's motto, a posse ad esse, is drawn from the Latin philosophical principle "Ab esse ad posse valet, a posse ad esse non-valet consequentia", meaning "It is valid to conclude from actuality to possibility, but not from possibility to actuality".

== Headmasters ==
- 1947–1955: Thomas Joyce Parry
- 1955–1962: Nicholas A. Dromgoole, later Ballet correspondent for The Sunday Telegraph, married Lesley Collier, Principal ballerina of the Royal Ballet in Q4. 1977 in London
- 1962–1983: Anthony George Hill (7 April 1926 - Q1, 1983) (died in office)
- 1983–1992: John Payne
- 1993: Nigel Taylor

== Notable Old Pierrepontians ==
- Michael Baden-Powell, 4th Baron Baden-Powell and Scouting Leader
- Sir Merrick Cockell, Conservative politician
- Jonny Wilkinson, rugby player
- Sean Pertwee, actor
- Mark Williams-Thomas, Investigative TV reporter
