= Nigel Hastilow =

English politician (born 1956)

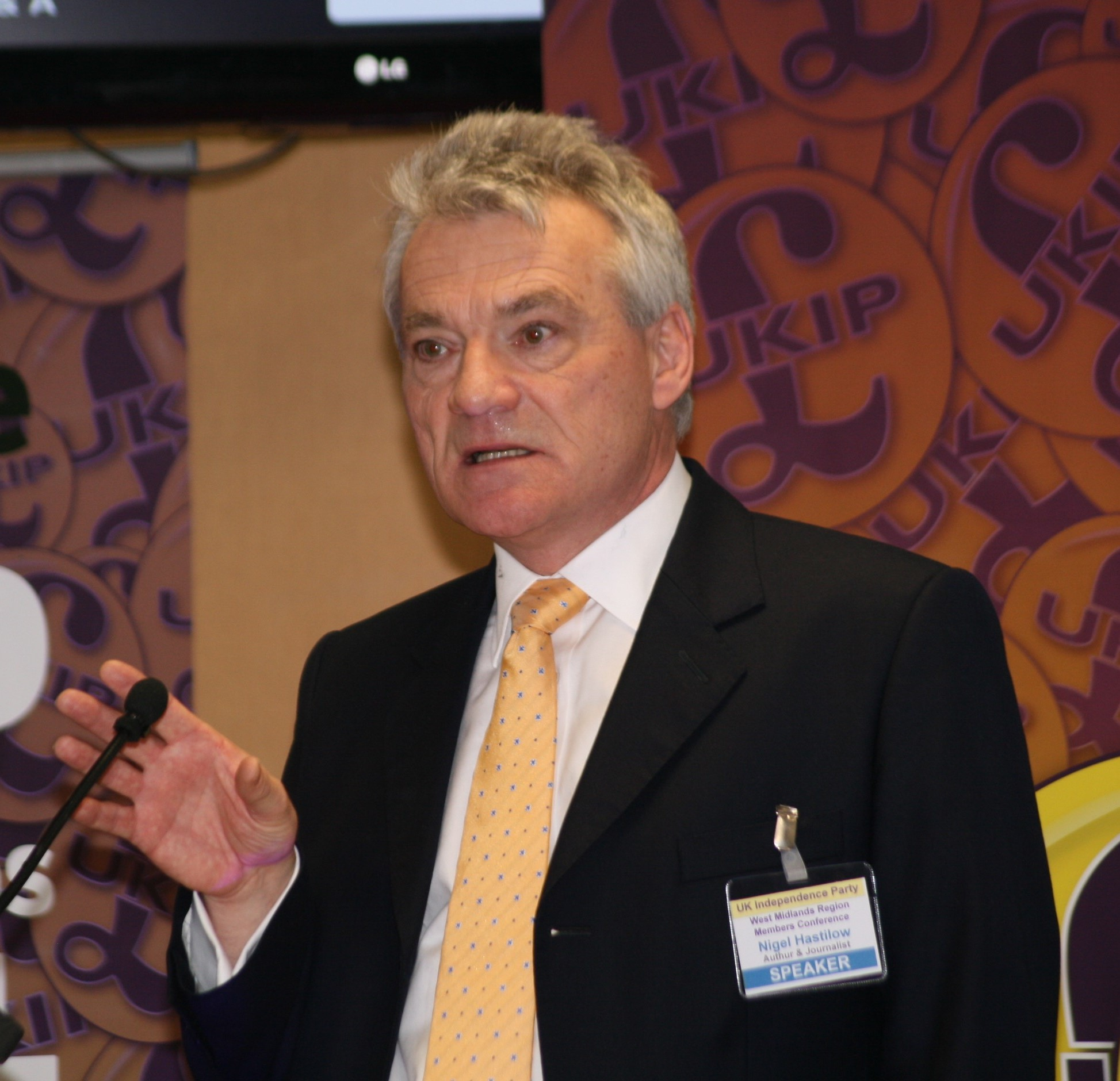
Hastilow in 2016

Nigel Hastilow (born 1956) is an English journalist, author, businessman and politician. He is a former editor of the Birmingham Post and was the Conservative Party candidate for Birmingham Edgbaston in the 2001 general election. In April 2007, Hastilow was selected a prospective parliamentary candidate (PPC) for the Conservative Party for the Halesowen and Rowley Regis constituency, but was deselected after he received criticism about a newspaper column he wrote for the Express & Star which included the statement "Enoch Powell was right" (in actuality quoting constituents he'd met whilst canvassing), sparking a national controversy about immigration and racism.

== Education ==
Hastilow was born in Birmingham and educated at Mill Hill School in London. After graduating from the University of Birmingham, he trained as a journalist.

== Journalism ==
Working for a variety of local newspapers in Birmingham, Hastilow became first political correspondent and then editor of the Birmingham Post. He subsequently became a columnist, set up his own publishing company which he later sold and also worked for the Institute of Directors and the Institute of Chartered Accountants. He writes regularly for the Express & Star and is author of The Last of England and Tomorrow's England.

== Political career ==
In 2001 Hastilow stood as a Conservative Party candidate in the constituency of Birmingham Edgbaston but lost to the Labour Party candidate, Gisela Stuart, at general election.

Earlier that year it had emerged that Hastilow had put a comment on his website which was subsequently taken up to attack Hague's leadership by Tony Blair at Prime Minister's Questions. However, the article itself had been approved by then party chairman Michael Ancram and argued that, contrary to the Prime Minister's claims, the Conservatives were the only party capable of defending Britain's interests and warning of Tony Blair's ambition to become the first President of the European Union.

In 2002 Hastilow was elected to Stratford-on-Avon District Council where he served as a councillor for two years. During that period he claimed no expenses. He was the only Conservative to oppose a 52 per cent council tax increase and also succeeded in committing the local authority to opposing the Labour Party's hunting ban.

In April 2007. Hastilow was selected to represent the Conservative Party in the constituency of Halesowen and Rowley Regis. However, he was dumped following the publication of his column in the 5 November edition of the Express & Star which caused political controversy. He stated how allegedly "uncontrolled" immigration was becoming an increasingly big issue for people in his Halesowen and Rowley Regis constituency. He said his constituents claimed that Enoch Powell, a politician noted for his Rivers of Blood speech, was right to warn that uncontrolled immigration would change the country dramatically.

This led to Hastilow being heavily criticised by fellow Conservatives such as David Davis. Labour MP Peter Hain, then Work and Pensions Secretary, said that Hastilow's remarks showed the Conservative Party's "racist underbelly".

== Political beliefs ==
Hastilow is an active member of the TaxPayers' Alliance, which campaigns for lower taxes and greater value for money in public spending. He is a supporter of The Freedom Association, and has spoken at some of its events including a debate on the future of the BBC, and he is a backer of the Drivers' Alliance, an organisation dedicated to defending the interests of motorists.

Hastilow is a strong advocate of free market economics, believing high taxes and increased regulation stifle entrepreneurialism and force businesses to abandon Britain. He believes in the importance of manufacturing industry and regrets that successive governments have neglected this vital aspect of the economy.

A traditionalist on education, Hastilow was for some time a member of the Conservative Party committee (chaired by John Bercow, a previous Speaker of the House of Commons) campaigning to protect the country's remaining grammar schools.

In 2015, Hastilow wrote an article stating that he wanted the UK to leave the European Union and he regarded Nigel Farage as "the most honest of our political leaders", but that he would not be voting for the UK Independence Party.
