= Lindi St Clair =

British madam

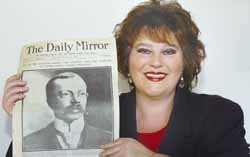
- Born: Marian June Akin; 11 August 1952 (age 74); London, England
- Occupations: Author; Political campaigner (retired)

Marian June Akin (born 11 August 1952), formerly known professionally as Lindi St Clair or Lindi St Claire, is a British author, leader of the Corrective Party, and campaigner for prostitutes' rights.

Originally a prostitute, but now retired and confirmed as a Christian, in 1993 St Clair accused the Inland Revenue in the High Court of England of being "Her Majesty's pimps", and living off immoral earnings, after its classification of prostitution as a trade in a high-profile court case.

St Clair stood for election to Parliament 11 times, and once to the European Parliament.

== Biography ==
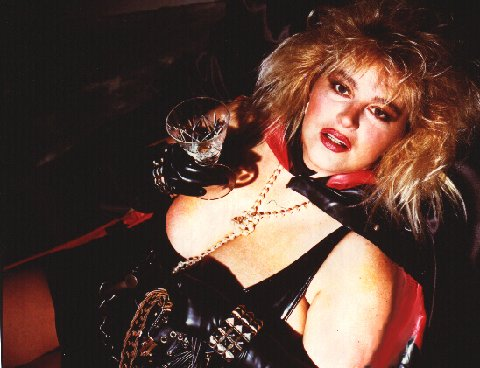
Lindi St Clair, aka Miss Whiplash.

Born in Hackney, London, Lindi St Clair's real name was Marian June Akin. She grew up in Swindon, Wiltshire, where she went to school and at 14 years of age became a beatnik, then a mod, then a rocker and a biker, running away from home to London where she associated with the rockers and Hells Angels. She found employment in a few menial jobs before becoming a prostitute on the streets and, not drinking, smoking or taking drugs, was able to save enough money to buy a large freehold Victorian end-of-terrace house in Earls Court. Here she ran a lavish brothel frequented by British and international politicians and aristocrats as a high-profile madam and dominatrix.

For many years from the mid-1970s until her bankruptcy in 1992 (after the Inland Revenue pursued her for tax evasion), St Clair offered sexual services from her own large four-storey house at Eardley Crescent in Earls Court, London. A successful professional dominatrix and madam, she once owned a yellow Rolls-Royce and had her own yacht, which she kept at Bray in Berkshire. In 1991 it emerged St Clair was renting Chancellor of the Exchequer Norman Lamont's basement flat in Notting Hill. At one time, she claimed that 252 Members of Parliament had been her clients. She has appeared on television and radio on many occasions, including on The Ruby Wax Show and The James Whale Show.

Despite being taxed on her earnings, St Clair found when she attempted to register the companies "Prostitutes Ltd", "Hookers Ltd" and "Lindi St Clair (French Lessons) Ltd" that they were all rejected by the Registrar of Companies, and then "Lindi St Clair (Personal Services) Ltd" by the Attorney General.

St Clair spelled her surname "St Claire" between 1974 and 1985 and has also used the names Miss Whiplash, Carla Davis and Lily Lavender.

== Corrective Party ==
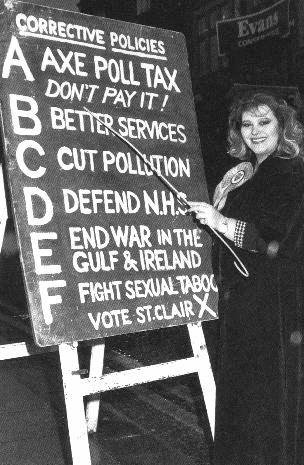
St Clair campaigning as a prospective Member of Parliament on behalf of the Corrective Party for the Ribble Valley by-election in 1991.

Described as the fastest growing fringe party in 1993, the Corrective Party was a radical British political party that campaigned for social justice, civil liberties, animal rights and sexual freedom.

St Clair attempted to become elected to the House of Commons, in eleven by-elections, on one occasion threatening to expose the depraved lives of hundreds of MPs. The Corrective Party shared its election agent with the Monster Raving Loony Party.

In June 1991 she was involved in a controversy when Norman Lamont, the then Chancellor of the Exchequer, was investigated for using taxpayers' money to handle the fall-out from press stories concerning 'Miss Whiplash' (not Lindi St Clair), who was using a flat he owned (the Treasury contributed £4,700 of the £23,000 bill which had been formally approved by the Head of the Civil Service and the Prime Minister).

== Inland Revenue case ==
She accused the Inland Revenue of trying to live off immoral earnings when they asked her to pay £112,779.92 in back income tax, because they classed prostitution as a trade. She was pursued by tax inspector S. J. Pinkney, and her accountant claimed that as a result of the case she made two suicide attempts. She lost the case claiming, "The tax man is a pimp and the government is a pimp as well."

== Religious conversion ==
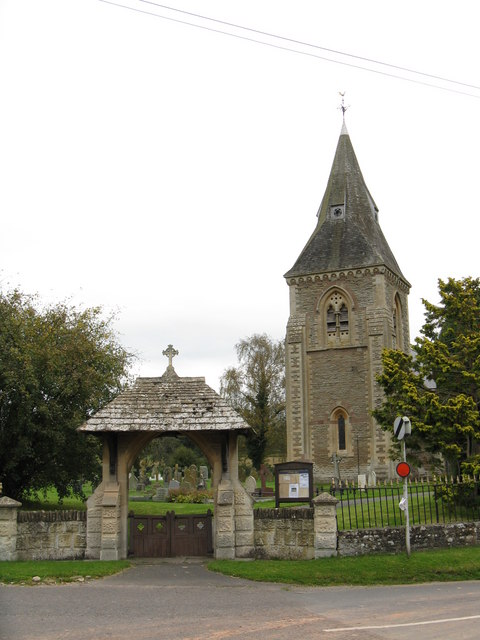
Stoke Lacy Church in Herefordshire.

On 27 February 2009 it was reported that St Clair had been rescued from her car and flown to hospital after the vehicle left a Herefordshire road near Risbury and landed upside down in a stream, trapping her for up to 24 hours. This experience led her to embrace Christianity.

== Bibliography ==
- Lindi St. Clair and Pamela Winfield, It's Only a Game: The Autobiography of Miss Whiplash, Piatkus, 1992. ISBN 0-7499-1171-9
- Lindi St. Clair and Pamela Winfield, Miss Whiplash: My Sensational Life Story, Pan Books, 1993. ISBN 0-330-33080-2.
