= 2011 East Devon District Council election =

Local election in Devon, UK

Results of the 2011 East Devon District Council election

Elections to East Devon District Council were held on 5 May 2011, alongside other local elections across the United Kingdom. All 59 seats on the council were up for election. Following the election the Conservative Party remained in overall control.

== Results summary ==
2011 East Devon District Council election
Party	Seats	Change
Conservative Party	43	▲1
Liberal Democrats	10	Steady
Others	6	▼1

== Results by ward (A-Z) ==
=== Axminster Rural (1) ===
Axminster Rural
Party	Candidate	Votes	%	±%
Independent	John Jeffery *	Unopposed	N/A	N/A
Majority		N/A	N/A	N/A
Turnout		N/A	N/A	N/A
Independent gain from Conservative		Swing	N/A	

Councillor Jeffery was elected as a Conservative in 2007, but sought re-election as an independent. He would ultimately be returned to the council unopposed.

=== Axminster Town (2) ===
Axminster Town
Party	Candidate	Votes	%	±%
Liberal Democrats	Douglas Hull *	838	43.5	−3.2
Conservative	Andrew Moulding *	826	42.9	−3.9
Conservative	Wendy Cryer	585		
Liberal Democrats	John Stevenson	356		
Labour	Jeremy Walden	262	13.6	+7.1
Majority		N/A	0.6	+0.5
Turnout		2867	N/A	N/A
Liberal Democrats hold		Swing	N/A	
Conservative hold		Swing	N/A	

=== Beer & Branscombe (1) ===
Beer & Branscombe
Party	Candidate	Votes	%	±%
Independent	Geoff Pook	430	51.5	N/A
Conservative	John Tristram	270	32.3	N/A
Liberal Democrats	Lewis Ragbourn	135	16.2	N/A
Majority		160	19.2	N/A
Turnout		835	N/A	N/A
Independent hold		Swing	N/A	

=== Broadclyst (2) ===
Broadclyst
Party	Candidate	Votes	%	±%
Liberal Democrats	Derek Button *	975	51.8	+10.0
Conservative	Peter Bowden *	907	48.2	+0.7
Conservative	Karl Busch	679		
Liberal Democrats	Stephen Schlich	584		
Majority		N/A	3.6	−2.1
Turnout		3145	N/A	N/A
Liberal Democrats hold		Swing	N/A	
Conservative hold		Swing	N/A	

=== Budleigh (3) ===
Budleigh
Party	Candidate	Votes	%	±%
Conservative	Steve Hall *	1,900	44.8	−6.9
Conservative	Alan Dent	1,392		
Conservative	Thomas Wright	1,290		
Independent	Caz Sismore-Hunt	938	22.1	−13.2
UKIP	Graham Hooker	725	17.1	N/A
Green	Miriam Brown	676	15.9	N/A
Majority		N/A	22.7	+6.3
Turnout		6921	N/A	N/A
Conservative hold		Swing	N/A	
Conservative hold		Swing	N/A	
Conservative hold		Swing	N/A	

=== Clyst Valley (1) ===
Clyst Valley
Party	Candidate	Votes	%	±%
Conservative	Michael Howe	710	75.3	+1.4
Liberal Democrats	Marion Gammell	233	24.7	−1.4
Majority		477	50.6	+2.8
Turnout		943	N/A	N/A
Conservative hold		Swing	N/A	

=== Coly Valley (2) ===
Coly Valley
Party	Candidate	Votes	%	±%
Conservative	Helen Parr *	1,225	55.6	+0.6
Conservative	Graham Godbeer *	1,045		
Independent	Paul Arnott	646	29.3	+2.1
Independent	Sheila Smith	545		
UKIP	Alec Yates	331	15.0	N/A
Majority		N/A	26.3	−1.5
Turnout		3792	N/A	N/A
Conservative hold		Swing	N/A	
Conservative hold		Swing	N/A	

=== Dunkeswell (1) ===
Dunkeswell
Party	Candidate	Votes	%	±%
Conservative	Bob Buxton	Unopposed	N/A	N/A
Majority		N/A	N/A	N/A
Turnout		N/A	N/A	N/A
Conservative hold		Swing	N/A	

=== Exe Valley (1) ===
Exe Valley
Party	Candidate	Votes	%	±%
Conservative	Deborah Custance Baker	491	60.2	−8.9
Liberal Democrats	Sue Button	324	39.8	+19.2
Majority		167	20.4	−28.1
Turnout		815	N/A	N/A
Conservative hold		Swing	N/A	

=== Exmouth Brixington (3) ===
Exmouth Brixington
Party	Candidate	Votes	%	±%
Independent	Trevor Cope *	894	31.9	N/A
Conservative	David Chapman *	800	28.5	−12.5
Conservative	Maddy Chapman	777		
Independent	Jeff Trail	730		
Conservative	Cherry Nicholas	714		
Liberal Democrats	Andrew Toye	408	14.6	−28.1
Liberal Democrats	Brian Toye	407		
UKIP	John Hone	366	13.1	N/A
Labour	Stuart Fegan	335	12.0	−4.3
Majority		N/A	3.4	+1.7
Turnout		5431	N/A	N/A
Independent gain from Liberal Democrats		Swing	N/A	
Conservative hold		Swing	N/A	
Conservative hold		Swing	N/A	

Councillor Cope was elected as a Liberal Democrat in 2007, but sought re-election as an independent. He would ultimately win re-election.

=== Exmouth Halsdon (3) ===
Exmouth Halsdon
Party	Candidate	Votes	%	±%
Conservative	Jill Elson *	1,174	34.2	−12.2
Conservative	Viviene Duval Steer *	1,115		
Conservative	Pauline Stott *	1,108		
Liberal Democrats	Tim Dumper	1058	30.8	+1.9
Labour	Carole Newton	660	19.2	+9.9
UKIP	John Kelly	545	15.9	+0.5
Majority		N/A	3.4	−14.1
Turnout		5660	N/A	N/A
Conservative hold		Swing	N/A	
Conservative hold		Swing	N/A	
Conservative hold		Swing	N/A	

=== Exmouth Littleham (3) ===
Exmouth Littleham
Party	Candidate	Votes	%	±%
Conservative	John Humphreys *	1,577	44.9	−2.9
Conservative	Mark Williamson *	1,548		
Conservative	Tim Wood *	1,474		
Labour	David Gwilliam	764	21.7	+12.5
Independent	Mark Hawkins	679	19.3	N/A
UKIP	Lesley Kelly	493	14.0	+5.9
Majority		N/A	23.2	+10.3
Turnout		6535	N/A	N/A
Conservative hold		Swing	N/A	
Conservative hold		Swing	N/A	
Conservative hold		Swing	N/A	

=== Exmouth Town (3) ===
Exmouth Town
Party	Candidate	Votes	%	±%
Liberal Democrats	Eileen Wragg *	833	37.3	−12.4
Liberal Democrats	Patricia Graham *	758		
Liberal Democrats	Steve Gazzard	676		
Conservative	May Hardy *	547	24.5	−1.4
Conservative	Richard Turner	478		
Conservative	Bill Nash	467		
Green	Paul Bennett	397	17.8	N/A
UKIP	David Wilson	270	12.1	N/A
Independent	Sarka Andersonova	185	8.3	N/A
Majority		N/A	12.8	−11.0
Turnout		4611	N/A	N/A
Liberal Democrats hold		Swing	N/A	
Liberal Democrats hold		Swing	N/A	
Liberal Democrats hold		Swing	N/A	

May Hardy was elected as a Liberal Democrat in 2007, but sought re-election as a Conservative. She would ultimately fail to be re-elected.

=== Exmouth Withycombe Raleigh (3) ===
Exmouth Withycombe Raleigh
Party	Candidate	Votes	%	±%
Liberal Democrats	Brenda Taylor *	1,066	58.9	−3.5
Liberal Democrats	Steve Wragg *	941		
Liberal Democrats	Geoff Chamberlain *	921		
Conservative	Cecilia Brown	744	41.1	+3.5
Conservative	Alison Greenhalgh	672		
Conservative	Sandy Sutton	661		
Majority		N/A	17.8	−7.0
Turnout		5005	N/A	N/A
Liberal Democrats hold		Swing	N/A	
Liberal Democrats hold		Swing	N/A	
Liberal Democrats hold		Swing	N/A	

=== Feniton & Buckerell (1) ===
Feniton & Buckerell
Party	Candidate	Votes	%	±%
Conservative	Graham Brown *	512	56.5	+5.9
Liberal Democrats	James Tomkins	394	43.5	−5.9
Majority		118	13.0	+11.8
Turnout		906	N/A	N/A
Conservative hold		Swing	N/A	

=== Honiton St Michael's (3) ===
Honiton St Michael's
Party	Candidate	Votes	%	±%
Conservative	Peter Halse	998	34.4	−35.4
Conservative	Mike Allen	963		
Conservative	Phil Twiss	813		
Green	Sharon Pavey	676	23.3	N/A
Independent	David Foster	543	18.7	N/A
Labour	Susan Groves	375	12.9	−17.3
Liberal Democrats	Jonathan Underwood	307	10.6	N/A
Independent	John Taylor	294		
Liberal Democrats	William Foster	215		
Liberal Democrats	Geoffrey Hucklebridge	167		
Majority		N/A	11.1	−28.5
Turnout		5351	N/A	N/A
Conservative hold		Swing	N/A	
Conservative hold		Swing	N/A	
Conservative hold		Swing	N/A	

=== Honiton St Paul's (2) ===
Honiton St Paul's
Party	Candidate	Votes	%	±%
Conservative	Roger Boote **	849	42.8	+9.2
Conservative	John O'Leary	711		
Liberal Democrats	Roy Coombs	455	23.0	+0.6
Labour	Sharon Holloway	342	17.3	+10.0
Green	Christine Tootill	336	17.0	N/A
Majority		N/A	19.8	+16.7
Turnout		2693	N/A	N/A
Conservative gain from Independent		Swing	N/A	
Conservative hold		Swing	N/A	

Councillor Boote was elected as a Conservative for Honiton St Michael's in 2007, but sought re-election in Honiton St Paul's. He would ultimately win re-election.

=== Newbridges (1) ===
Newbridges
Party	Candidate	Votes	%	±%
Conservative	Iain Chubb *	818	70.6	+1.3
Liberal Democrats	Christina Eddy	341	29.4	−1.3
Majority		477	41.2	+2.6
Turnout		1159	N/A	N/A
Conservative hold		Swing	N/A	

=== Newton Poppleford & Harpford (1) ===
Newton Poppleford & Harpford
Party	Candidate	Votes	%	±%
Conservative	Kenneth Potter *	Unopposed	N/A	N/A
Majority		N/A	N/A	N/A
Turnout		N/A	N/A	N/A
Conservative hold		Swing	N/A	

=== Otterhead (1) ===
Otterhead
Party	Candidate	Votes	%	±%
Conservative	David Key *	Unopposed	N/A	N/A
Majority		N/A	N/A	N/A
Turnout		N/A	N/A	N/A
Conservative hold		Swing	N/A	

=== Ottery St Mary Rural (2) ===
Ottery St Mary Rural
Party	Candidate	Votes	%	±%
Independent	Claire Wright	1,364	55.7	N/A
Conservative	Tony Howard	822	33.6	−42.3
Conservative	Sara Randall Johnson *	797		
Labour	Judith Blackwell	263	10.7	N/A
Majority		N/A	22.1	−29.7
Turnout		3246	N/A	N/A
Independent gain from Conservative		Swing	N/A	
Conservative hold		Swing	N/A	

=== Ottery St Mary Town (2) ===
Ottery St Mary Town
Party	Candidate	Votes	%	±%
Independent	Roger Giles *	1,546	59.7	−3.6
Conservative	David Cox *	628	24.2	−3.7
Labour	Andrew Blackwell	417	16.1	+7.3
Majority		918	35.5	+0.1
Turnout		2591	N/A	N/A
Independent hold		Swing	N/A	
Conservative hold		Swing	N/A	

=== Raleigh (1) ===
Raleigh
Party	Candidate	Votes	%	±%
Conservative	Ray Bloxham	Unopposed	N/A	N/A
Majority		N/A	N/A	N/A
Turnout		N/A	N/A	N/A
Conservative hold		Swing	N/A	

=== Seaton (3) ===
Seaton
Party	Candidate	Votes	%	±%
Conservative	Jim Knight *	1,086	30.2	−12.1
Liberal Democrats	Peter Burrows	1,039	28.9	−11.9
Conservative	Steph Jones *	983		
Conservative	Julian Broomfield	805		
Liberal Democrats	Dawn Squire	789		
Liberal Democrats	Mark Fisher	755		
Green	Emily McIvor	593	16.5	N/A
UKIP	Jeremy Allison	494	13.7	+2.2
UKIP	Alan Walsh	437		
Labour	Stephen Williams	388	10.8	+5.4
Majority		N/A	1.3	−0.2
Turnout		7369	N/A	N/A
Conservative hold		Swing	N/A	
Liberal Democrats hold		Swing	N/A	
Conservative hold		Swing	N/A	

=== Sidmouth Rural (1) ===
Sidmouth Rural
Party	Candidate	Votes	%	±%
Conservative	Chris Wale	587	56.2	N/A
Independent	David Barratt	282	27.0	N/A
Green	Sharon Howe	175	16.8	N/A
Majority		305	29.2	N/A
Turnout		1044	N/A	N/A
Conservative hold		Swing	N/A	

=== Sidmouth Sidford (3) ===
Sidmouth Sidford
Party	Candidate	Votes	%	±%
Conservative	Christine Drew *	Unopposed	N/A	N/A
Conservative	Stuart Hughes *	Unopposed	N/A	N/A
Conservative	Graham Trotman *	Unopposed	N/A	N/A
Majority		N/A	N/A	N/A
Turnout		N/A	N/A	N/A
Conservative hold		Swing	N/A	
Conservative hold		Swing	N/A	
Conservative hold		Swing	N/A	

=== Sidmouth Town (3) ===
Sidmouth Town
Party	Candidate	Votes	%	±%
Conservative	Sheila Kerridge	1,224	37.0	−13.4
Conservative	Frances Newth *	1,193		
Conservative	Peter Sullivan	1,058		
Independent	John Dyson	999	30.2	−0.8
UKIP	Lawrie Brownlee	615	18.6	+0.1
Labour	Ian Walker	466	14.1	N/A
Majority		N/A	6.8	−12.6
Turnout		5555	N/A	N/A
Conservative hold		Swing	N/A	
Conservative hold		Swing	N/A	
Conservative hold		Swing	N/A	

=== Tale Vale (1) ===
Tale Vale
Party	Candidate	Votes	%	±%
Conservative	Philip Skinner *	703	67.9	−16.5
Green	Elizabeth Anstis	332	32.1	N/A
Majority		371	35.8	−33.0
Turnout		1035	N/A	N/A
Conservative hold		Swing	N/A	

=== Trinity (1) ===
Trinity
Party	Candidate	Votes	%	±%
Conservative	Ian Thomas	764	74.8	+25.2
Liberal Democrats	Robert Jordan	257	25.2	N/A
Majority		507	49.6	+48.8
Turnout		1021	N/A	N/A
Conservative gain from Independent		Swing	N/A	

=== Whimple (1) ===
Whimple
Party	Candidate	Votes	%	±%
Liberal Democrats	Martin Gammell	516	50.8	+3.7
Conservative	Andrew Dinnis *	500	49.2	−3.7
Majority		16	1.6	−4.2
Turnout		1016	N/A	N/A
Liberal Democrats gain from Conservative		Swing	N/A	

=== Woodbury & Lympstone (2) ===
Woodbury & Lympstone
Party	Candidate	Votes	%	±%
Independent	Benjamin Ingham *	1,081	54.7	+10.5
Conservative	David Atkins	894	45.3	+17.1
Conservative	Dave Moore	264		
Majority		N/A	9.4	−6.6
Turnout		2239	N/A	N/A
Independent hold		Swing	N/A	
Conservative gain from Independent		Swing	N/A	

=== Yarty (1) ===
Yarty
Party	Candidate	Votes	%	±%
Conservative	Paul Diviani *	Unopposed	N/A	N/A
Majority		N/A	N/A	N/A
Turnout		N/A	N/A	N/A
Conservative hold		Swing	N/A	

== See also ==
- East Devon District Council elections
