= Kate Hollern =

British Labour politician

Kate Hollern CBE
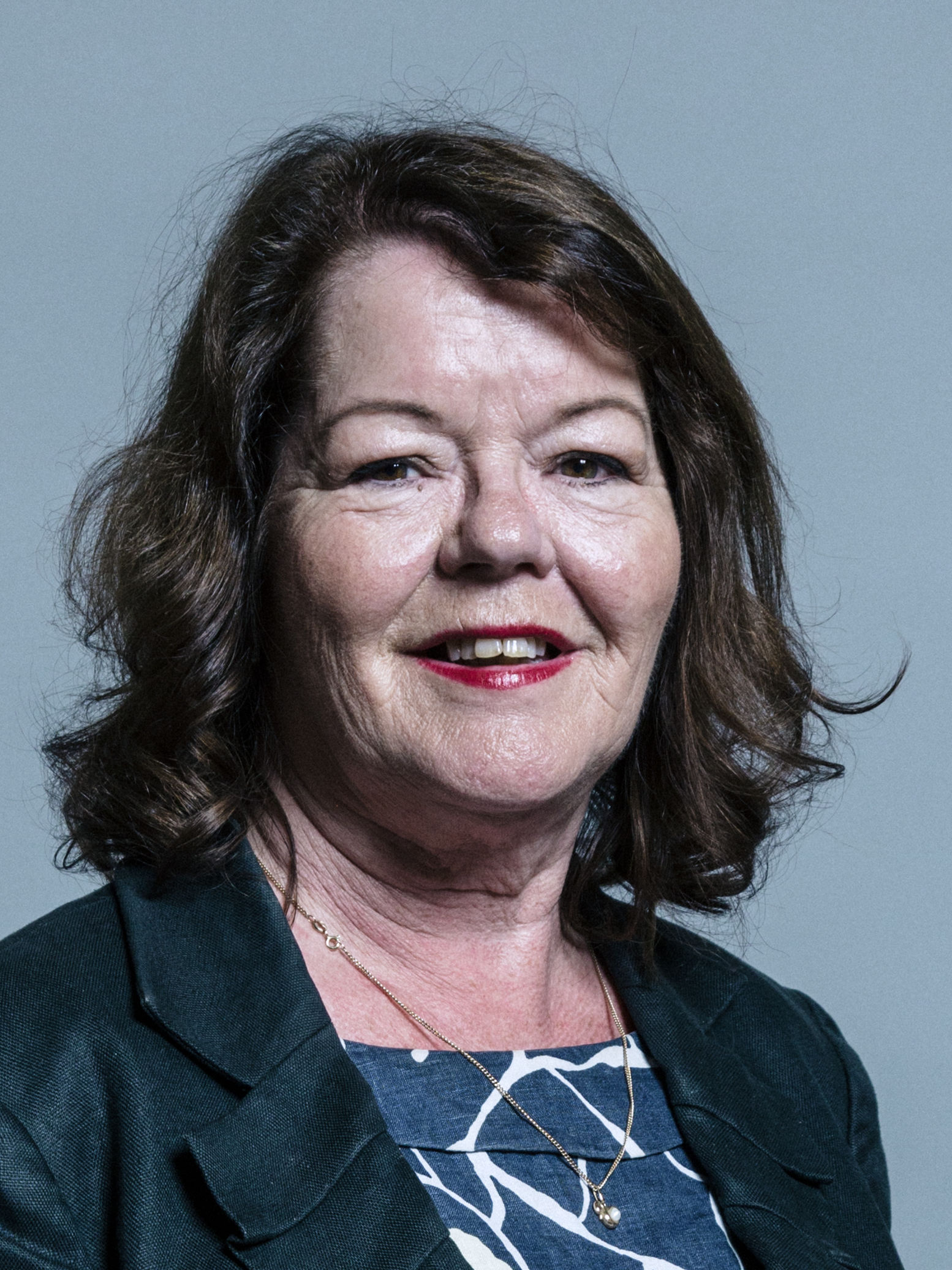
- Official portrait, 2017

Member of Parliament for Blackburn
- In office 7 May 2015 – 30 May 2024
- Preceded by: Jack Straw
- Succeeded by: Adnan Hussain

Leader of Blackburn with Darwen Council
- In office 14 September 2010 – 1 April 2015
- Preceded by: Michael Lee
- Succeeded by: Mohammed Khan
- In office 1 July 2004 – 17 May 2007
- Preceded by: Bill Taylor
- Succeeded by: Colin Rigby

Member of Blackburn with Darwen Council
- In office 4 May 1995 – 7 May 2015
- Preceded by: Christine Cramsie
- Succeeded by: Quesir Mahmood
- Constituency: Wensley Fold (1997–2015); Bank Top (1995–1997)

Personal details
- Born: Catherine Malloy Hollern; 12 April 1955 (age 71) Dumbarton, Scotland
- Party: Labour
- Spouse: John Roberts (c.1990; died 2017)
- Children: 2

Catherine Malloy Hollern CBE (born 12 April 1955) is a British politician who served as Member of Parliament (MP) for Blackburn from 2015 to 2024. A member of the Labour Party, she was Leader of Blackburn with Darwen Council from 2004 to 2007 and 2010 to 2015.

== Early life and career ==
Catherine Hollern was born on 12 April 1955 in Dumbarton. She moved to Blackburn in the late 1970s. Hollern worked in management at a Blackburn footwear factory and later Blackburn College.

At the 1995 local elections, Hollern was elected to represent Bank Top on Blackburn with Darwen Council. She defeated the incumbent councillor, a former Labour representative standing as an independent.

Hollern was re-elected to represent Wensley Fold following boundary changes in 1997, and in 2004 she succeeded Bill Taylor to become Council Leader. She continued as group leader after Labour lost control in 2007, she returned to lead the Council once they regained power in 2010.

Hollern stepped down as Council Leader and as a councillor in March 2015.

== Parliamentary career ==
In March 2014, Hollern was selected, using an all-women shortlist, to succeed former cabinet minister Jack Straw as the Labour candidate for Blackburn. At the 2015 general election, Hollern was elected to Parliament as MP for Blackburn with 56.3% of the vote and a majority of 12,760.

Hollern served as a Shadow Defence Minister from January 2016 to October 2016.

She supported Owen Smith in the failed attempt to replace Jeremy Corbyn in the leadership election. On 10 October 2016, she was appointed Shadow Minister for Communities and Local Government.

At the snap 2017 general election, Hollern was re-elected as MP for Blackburn with an increased vote share of 69.8% and an increased majority of 20,368.

In July 2017, Hollern was appointed as Corbyn's Parliamentary private secretary (PPS).

Hollern was again re-elected at the 2019 general election, with a decreased vote share of 64.9% and a decreased majority of 18,304.

Following Keir Starmer's election as Labour leader, Hollern served as Shadow Minister for Communities and Local Government from 2020. She resigned on 12 May 2021 after being accused of trying to "isolate a parliamentary worker who had made allegations of sexual harassment" against former Labour MP Mike Hill.

In January 2024, Hollern was re-selected as the Labour candidate for Blackburn at the 2024 general election. She lost in that election to Independent candidate Adnan Hussain by 132 votes.

== Personal life ==
Hollern's partner of 26 years was politician and trade unionist John Roberts. Roberts served as a Member of Blackburn with Darwen Council and Chair of Blackburn Labour. He died in 2017 at the age of 61, having been diagnosed with cancer shortly after Hollern's election to Parliament in 2015.

Parliament of the United Kingdom
Preceded by Jack Straw	Member of Parliament for Blackburn; 2015–2024	Succeeded by Adnan Hussain
Political offices
Preceded by Kevan Jones	Shadow Minister for the Armed Forces; 2016	Succeeded by Wayne David
Preceded by Steve Rotheram	Parliamentary Private Secretary to the Leader of the Opposition; 2017–2020	Succeeded by Tan Dhesi
Preceded by Jim McMahon	Shadow Minister for Local Government; 2020–2021	Succeeded by Jeff Smith
