= John Sumner =

John Sumner may refer to:

== Entertainment ==
- John Sumner (actor) (died 1649), English theatre actor during the Caroline era
- J. D. Sumner (1924–1998), American gospel singer and songwriter
- John Sumner (director) (1924–2013), English-born Australian artistic director and founder of Melbourne Theatre Company

== Religion ==
- John Sumner (priest) (died 1772), Canon of Windsor and Headmaster of Eton College
- John Bird Sumner (1780–1862), bishop in the Church of England and Archbishop of Canterbury

== Other ==
- John Robert Sumner (1850–1933), amateur footballer and 1873 FA Cup finalist
- John Sumner (tea merchant) (1856–1934)
- John S. Sumner (1876–1971), headed the New York Society for the Suppression of Vice
- John Sumner (climber) (1936–2004), British climber

== See also ==
- Jack Sumner (1840–1907), American explorer
