= Blackburn College =

Blackburn College may refer to:

- Blackburn College (Blackburn with Darwen), United Kingdom
- Blackburn College (Illinois), United States
