= William Marsden =

William Marsden may refer to:

- William Marsden (diplomat) (1940–2019), former British Ambassador to Argentina and Costa Rica
- William Marsden (orientalist) (1754–1836), the British First Secretaries to the Admiralty. Also an orientalist, linguist and numismatist
- William Marsden (sport shooter) (1860–1942), British Olympic sport shooter
- William Marsden (surgeon) (1796–1867), English surgeon
- William Marsden (footballer, born 1871) (1871–1943), English footballer
- Billy Marsden (1901–1983), English international footballer
- William Milnes Marsden (1873–1956), British solicitor and philatelist

== See also ==
- William Marston (disambiguation)
