= Blackburn University Centre =

British higher education provider

Coordinates: 53.748°N 2.489°W

- Former name: East Lancashire Institute of Higher Education (ELIHE)
- Established: 2009
- Affiliations: University of Wales, University of Central Lancashire, Lancaster University
- Principal: Dr Fazal Dad
- Location: Blackburn, England
- Campus: Urban
- Website: http://www.blackburn.ac.uk/university/welcome/

Blackburn University Centre (or BUC) is a higher education institute based in Blackburn, Lancashire, England, as part of Blackburn College.

University Centre offers degrees, HNC/HNDs and postgraduate courses, each validated by the University of South Wales, the University of Central Lancashire or Lancaster University.

== History ==
Formerly known as the East Lancashire Institute of Higher Education (ELIHE), the institution was formed in 1993 with the purchase of the old seven-floor former British Telecom building for £2.5 million and formally named the ELIHE in 2003. Each floor was given over to one of the various schools of education within the university structure, but the condition of the building meant that a new location for the institute would have to be found by the late 2000s.

Construction began on the new University Centre building near the main College campus in 2008 with a total investment cost of £13 million, the work was completed for the start of the 2009 academic year in 2009 when the building was opened by local MP Jack Straw and the then manager of Blackburn Rovers Football Club, Sam Allardyce.

In 2010, a further investment of £500,000 saw the canteen area, known as the Curve, expanded to improve student study and social space after an increase in student numbers during the building's second year of existence. In 2011, further expansion plans were revealed as University Centre looked to create places for a further 600 students. The planned extension will house facilities to focus on degree courses in sciences, technology, engineering and mathematics and will bring the total number of degree-level students to almost 3,000.

Also in 2011, the institute began the process of applying for the rights to validate its own degree programmes, The college applied to the Privy Council of the United Kingdom in 2011 for Foundation Degree Awarding Powers (FDAP), the decision on this application is expected in July 2016. The outcome of the FDAP application has been communicated to the governing body on 8 July; the FDAP application has been unsuccessful. The college are currently running degree courses that are validated externally by the University of Central Lancashire and Lancaster University

== University structure ==
The university contains the following schools:

- University Centre Business School
- School of Arts, Humanities and Social Science
- School of Law, Justice and Community Studies
- School of Education and Professional Studies
- School of Science and Technology

== Student life ==
=== Students' Union ===
The UCBC Students' Union has been active at the college since 2009 and during the final years of the ELIHE. The institution has also appointed a designated SU Liaison Officer to work with the Union.

As well as representing students, the Union also engages in campaigning on issues relevant to the student body, event organisation and has its own bar located near the SU Office.
