= Blackburn =

Town in Lancashire, England

Coordinates: 53.748°N 2.482°W

- Town
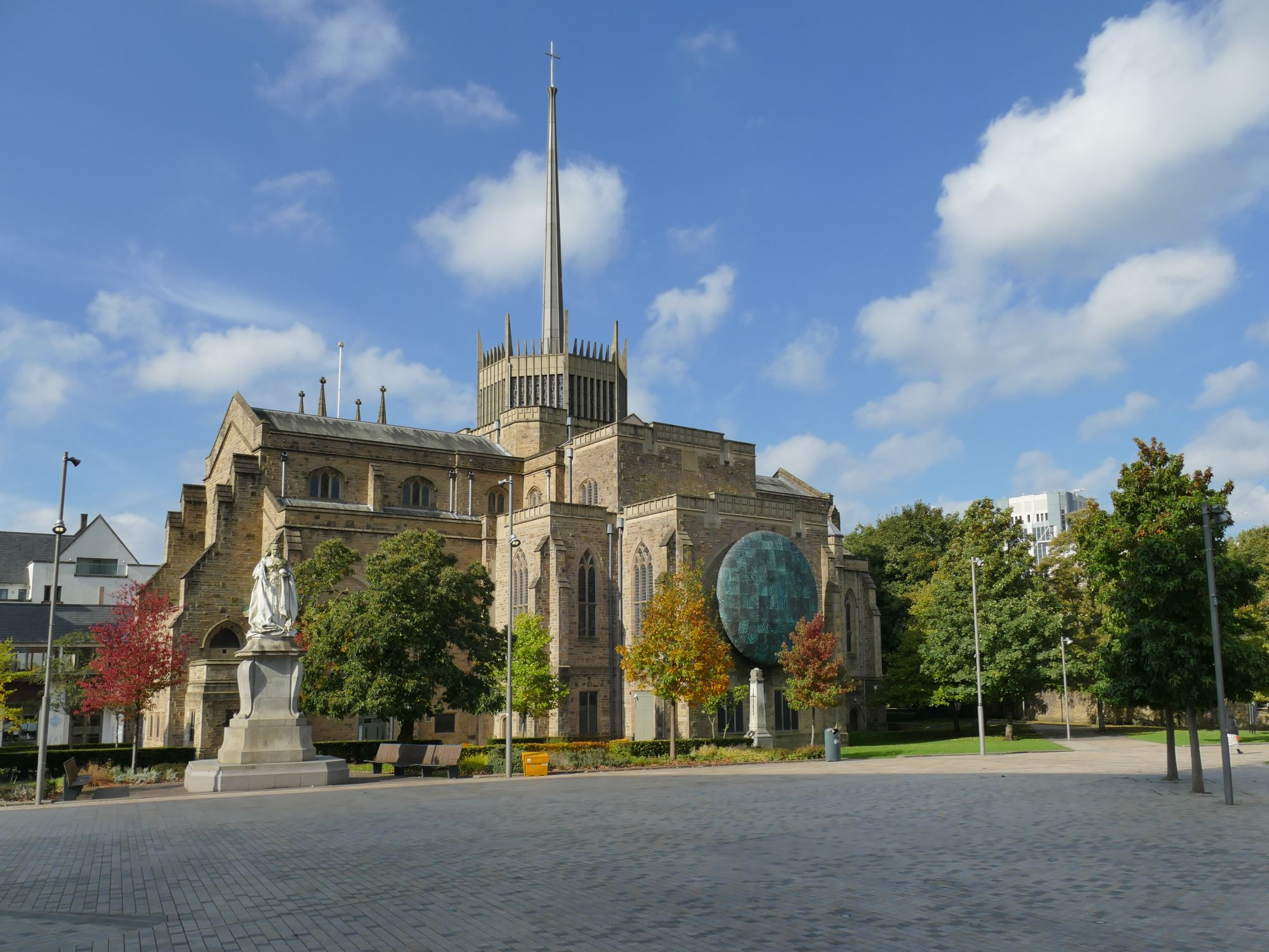
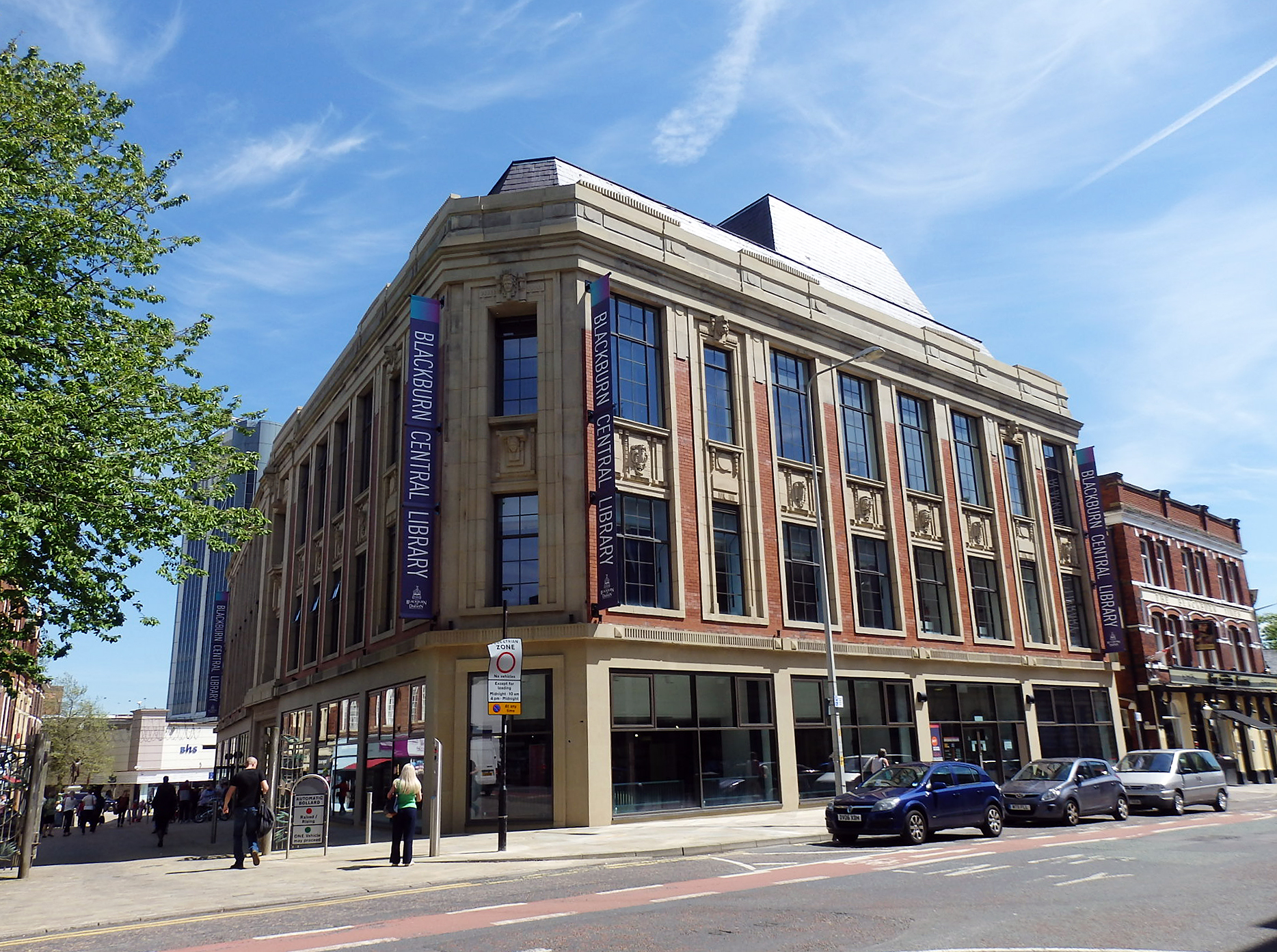
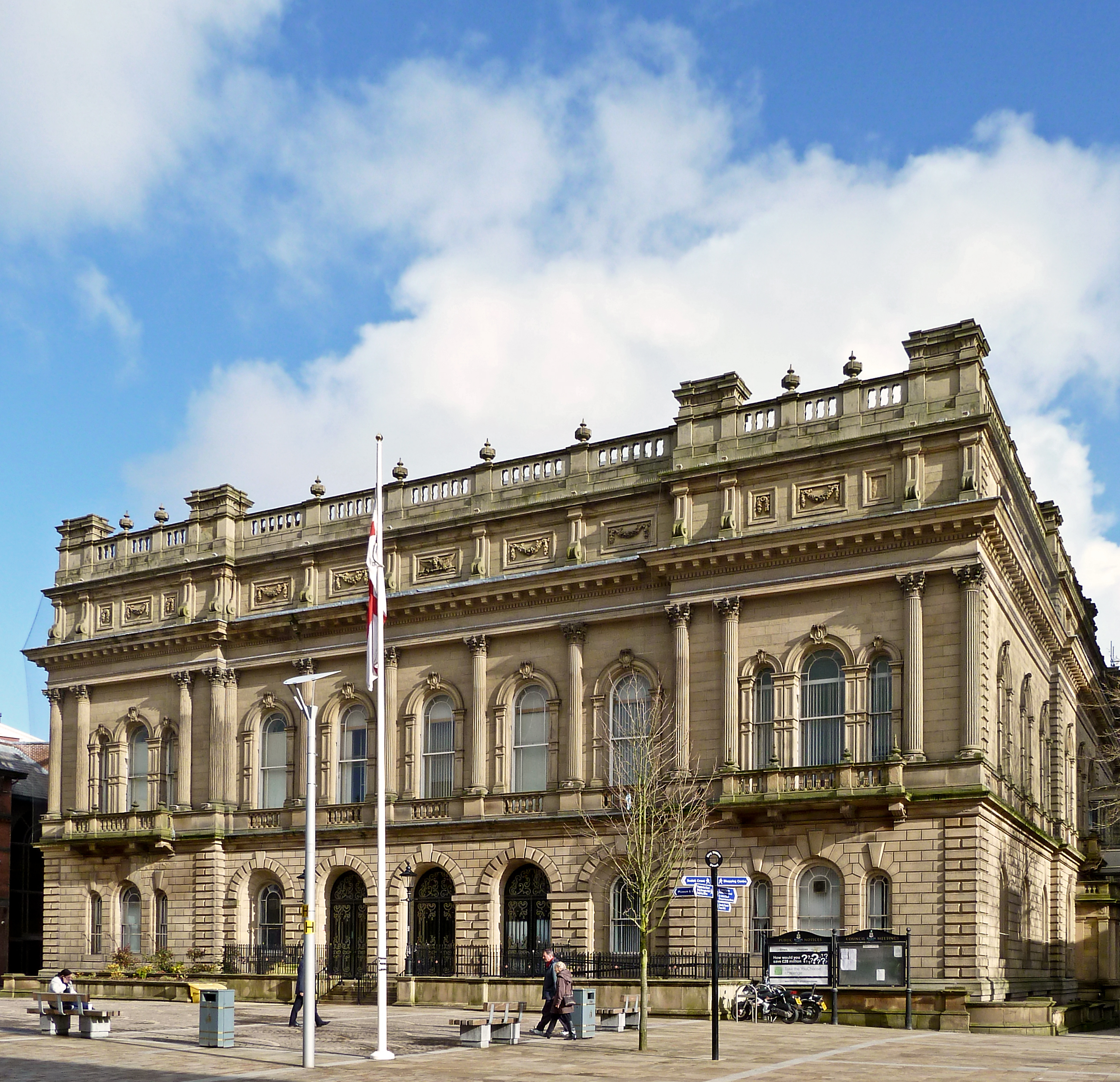
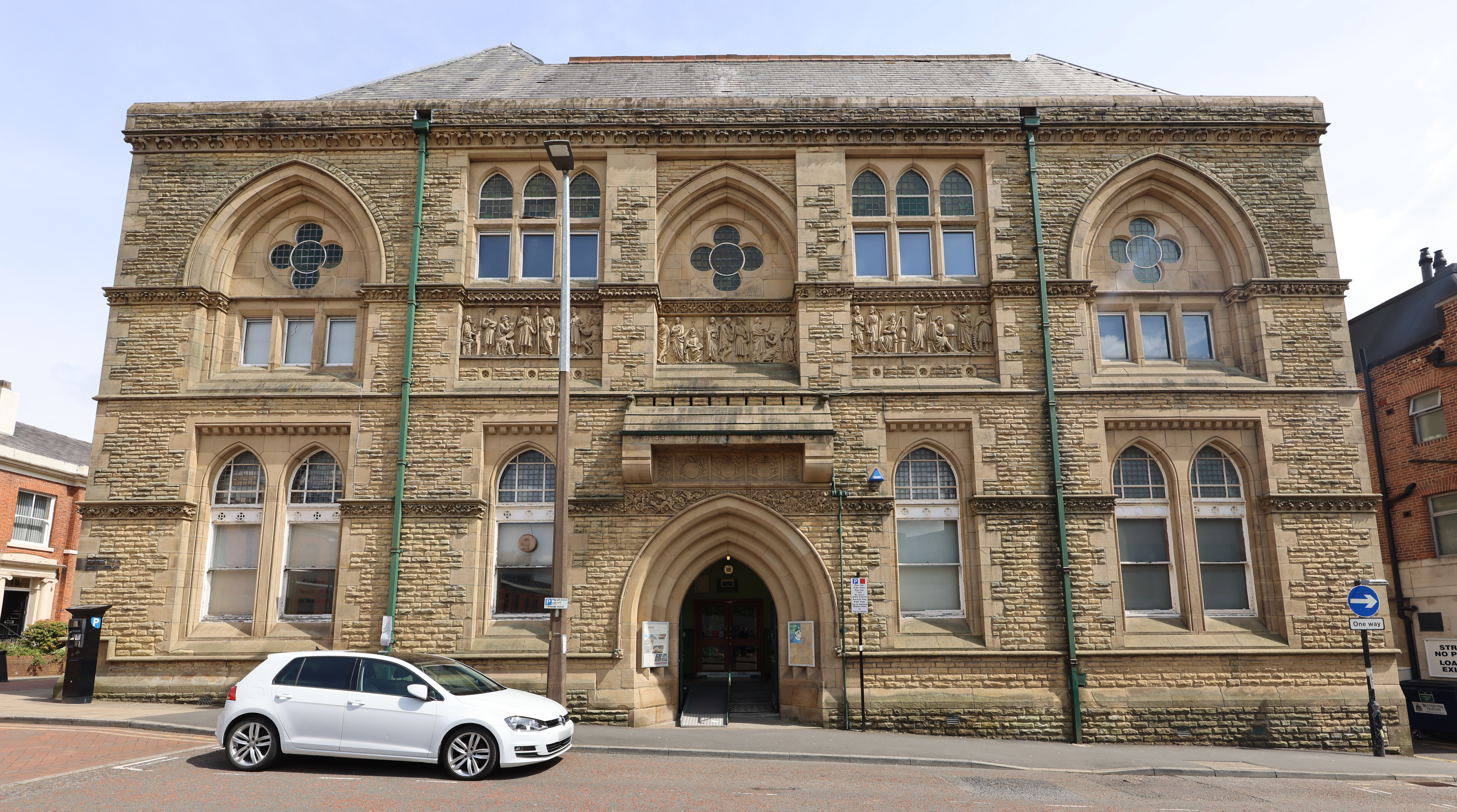
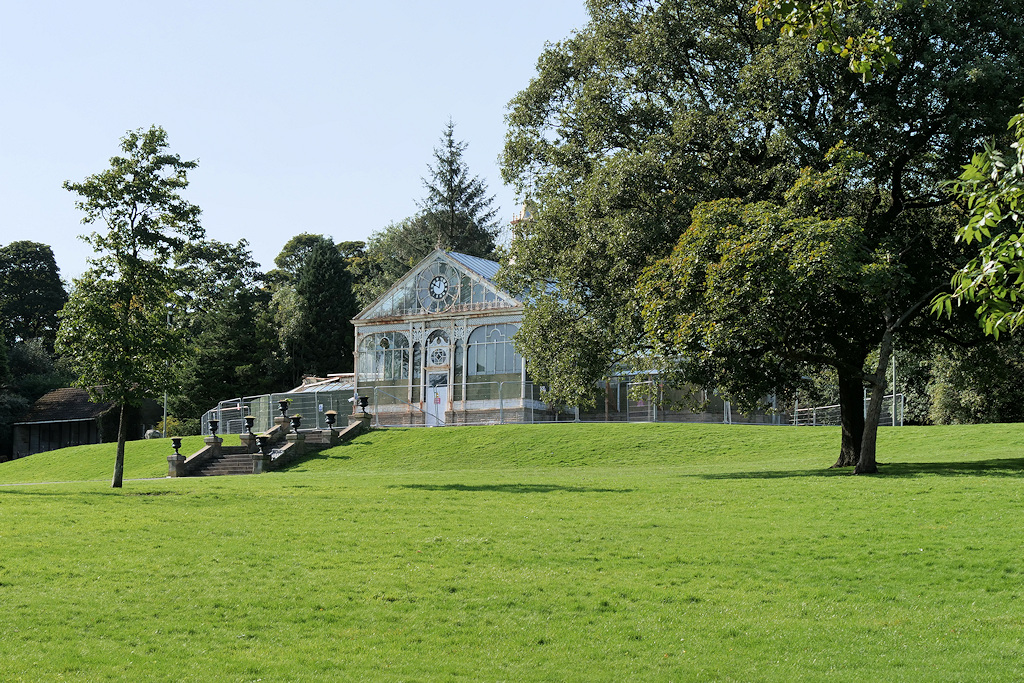
- Blackburn Cathedral Library Town Hall Museum and Art Gallery Corporation Park

- Location within Lancashire
- Population: 124,983 (2021)
  - Density: 11,114/sq mi (4,291/km^{2})
- Demonym: Blackburnian
- OS grid reference: SD685277
  - London: 184 mi (296 km) SSE
- Unitary authority: Blackburn with Darwen
- Ceremonial county: Lancashire
- Region: North West
- Country: England
- Sovereign state: United Kingdom
- Post town: BLACKBURN
- Postcode district: BB1, BB2
- Dialling code: 01254
- Police: Lancashire
- Fire: Lancashire
- Ambulance: North West
- UK Parliament: Blackburn
- Website: https://www.blackburn.gov.uk/

Blackburn (/ˈblækbɜːrn/) is an industrial town and the administrative centre of the Blackburn with Darwen borough, in Lancashire, England. The town lies north of the West Pennine Moors on the southern edge of the Ribble Valley, 8 miles (13 km) east of Preston and 21 miles (34 km) north-north-west of Manchester. (Note: By road 27 miles (43 km)) Blackburn is at the centre of the wider unitary authority area along with the town of Darwen. It is the second-largest town in Lancashire, after Blackpool.

At the 2021 census, Blackburn had a population of 124,983, while the wider borough of Blackburn with Darwen had a population of 154,922; 30.8% of the population of the town were people of ethnic backgrounds other than White British.

A former mill town, Blackburn has been the site of textile production since the mid-13th century, when wool was woven in people's houses in the domestic system. Flemish weavers who settled in the area in the 14th century helped to develop the woollen cottage industry. The most rapid period of growth and development in Blackburn's history coincided with the industrialisation and expansion of textile manufacturing.

Blackburn's textile sector fell into decline from the mid-20th century and subsequently faced similar challenges to other post-industrial northern towns, including deindustrialisation, economic deprivation and housing problems. The town has had significant investment and redevelopment since 1958 through government funding and the European Regional Development Fund.

== Toponymy ==
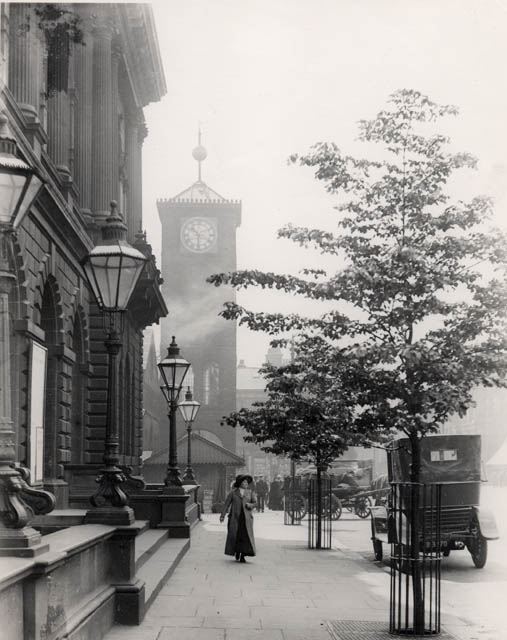
Blackburn's old clock tower in 1906 with time ball at the top of its mast

The origins of the town's name are uncertain. It has been suggested that it may be a combination of the River Blakewater and an Old English word "burn", meaning stream. Local author William Abram, in his 1877 history of the town and parish, cited the ancient name as Blake Burne. Abram also confirms that the region, later known as the Blackburn Hundred, was known as Blakeburneshyre. Blackburn was recorded in Domesday Book (1086) as Blacheburne and Blacheburn. By the time of John Speed's map of 1610, the spelling of the town was Blackburn, while the region was Blackburne. There is anecdotal speculation that the name of the town may simply mean "black burn" or "black stream".

== History ==
=== Prehistory ===
There is little evidence of prehistoric settlement in the Blakewater valley, in which Blackburn developed. Evidence of activity in the form of two urn burials has been discovered from the Bronze Age in the hills around Blackburn. In 1879, a cinerary urn was discovered at a tumulus at Revidge, north of the town; another was excavated in 1996 at Pleasington Cemetery, west of the town, by gravedigger Grant Higson. The presence of a sacred spring—perhaps in use during the Iron Age—provides evidence of prehistoric activity in the town centre, at All Hallows Spring on Railway Road.

=== Roman era ===
Blackburn is located where a Roman military road crossed the river Blakewater. The road linked Bremetennacum Veteranorum (Ribchester) and Mamucium (a major Roman fort that occupied Castlefield in Manchester). The route of the road passed east of Blackburn Cathedral and probably crossed the river in the Salford neighbourhood (Note: Not to be confused with Salford, in Greater Manchester.) just east of the modern town centre. It is not clear whether the road predated the settlement.

George C. Miller, in his Blackburn: The Evolution of a Cotton Town, said:

The ancient military way from Mamucium (Manchester) to (Bremetennacum) (Ribchester), passing over Blacksnape, plunges on its unswerving course through Blackamoor, over the scarp at Whinney Heights, to pass across the Blakewater in the vicinity of Salford. This fact alone presents a reasonable argument for the existence of a British oppidum or walled village on the site, it being customary for such primitive communities to cluster in the vicinity of a ford or bridge.

According to William Abram (1877):

The Parish of Blackburn contains many interesting vestiges. Three of the four principal roads constructed by the Romans in Lancashire traversed some portion of the Parish : —I. The lower road from the south to Carlisle, intersected the township of Walton-in-le-Dale. 2. The road from Manchester to Overborough crossed the Parish at its broadest part. 3. The road from the sea to the interior, which formed the conmiunication between the "Sistuntian Port" (on the Wyre) and Ribchester, Ilkley-in-Wharfedale, Aldborough andYork, enters Blackburn Parish at Ribchester, by a ford over the Ribble. The late Rev. E. Sibson, in a paper on the Roman Roads of the Wigan district, speaks of a road of this kind which branched off eastward from Blackrod, "Street-fold and Water-street, near Rivington, and by White Hough, in Tockholes, to the small Roman station at Blackburn, near the new road to Preston."

==== Roman temple spring at All Hallows ====
All Hallows Spring was excavated by Antiquarians in 1654 and found to contain an inscribed stone commemorating the dedication of a temple to Serapis by Claudius Hieronymus, legate of Legio VI Victrix.

=== Middle Ages ===
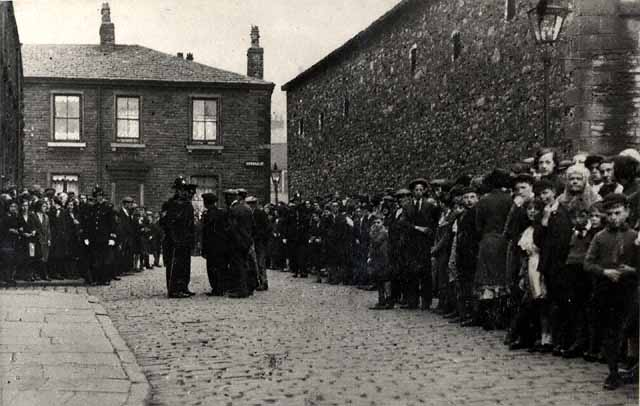
Strike of cotton mill workers in 1920 in Cowell Street in the Nab Lane area

Christianity is believed to have come to Blackburn by the end of the 6th century, in either 596 (as there is a record of a "church of Blagbourne" in that year) or 598 AD. The town was important during the Anglo-Saxon era when the Blackburnshire Hundred came into existence as a territorial division of the kingdom of Northumbria.

The name of the town appears in the Domesday Book as both Blacheburne and Blacheburn, a royal manor during the days of Edward the Confessor and William the Conqueror. Archaeological evidence from the demolition of the medieval parish church on the site of the cathedral in 1820 suggests that a church was built during the late 11th or early 12th century. A market cross was also erected nearby in 1101. The manor came into the possession of Henry de Blackburn, who divided it between his two sons. Later, one half was granted to the monks of Stanlow Abbey and this moiety was subsequently granted to the monks of Whalley Abbey. During the 12th century, the town's importance declined as Clitheroe became the regional centre. In addition to a settlement in the town centre area, there were several other medieval domiciles nearby.

=== Industrial Revolution and textiles ===
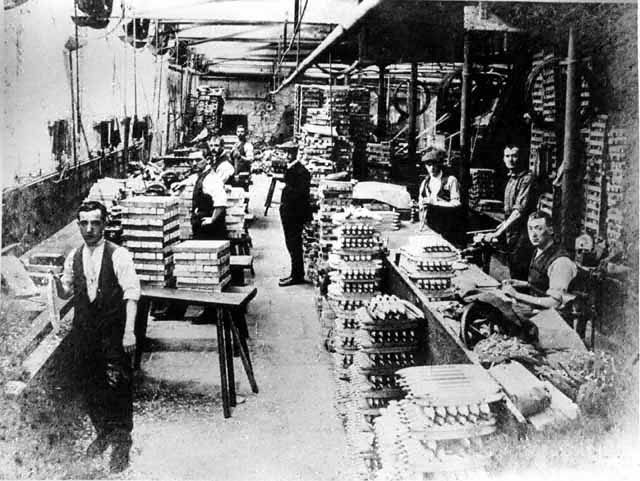
Workers producing shuttles for the textile industry, c. 1920. Rowland Baguley and Company, based on Addison Street, produced a wide range of shuttles for the home textile industry and for export before it closed in the early 1930s.

Textile manufacturing in Blackburn dates from the mid-13th century, when wool produced locally by farmers was woven in their homes. Flemish weavers who settled in the area in the 14th century developed the industry. By 1650 the town was known for the manufacture of blue and white "Blackburn checks", and "Blackburn greys" became famous not long afterwards. By the first half of the 18th century textile manufacture had become Blackburn's main industry. From the mid-18th to the early 20th century Blackburn evolved from a small market town into "the weaving capital of the world", and its population increased from less than 5,000 to over 130,000.

John Bartholomew's Gazetteer of the British Isles provides a profile of Blackburn in 1887:

Blackburn. parl. and mun. bor., parish and township, NE. Lancashire, 9 miles [14 km] E. of Preston and 210 miles [340 km] NW. of London by rail – par., 48,281 ac., pop. 161,617; township, 3681 ac., pop. 91,958; bor., 6974 ac., pop. 104,014; 4 Banks, 2 newspapers. Market-days, Wednesday and Saturday. It is one of the chief seats of cotton manufacture, besides producing calico, muslin, &c., there being over 140 mills at work. There are also factories for making cotton machinery and steam-engines. Blackburn has been associated with many improvements in the manufacture of cotton, among which was the invention (1767) of the "spinning jenny" which was invented in nearby Oswaldtwistle by James Hargreaves, who died in 1770. There are several fine churches and public buildings. A Corporation Park (50 acres in area) is on the outskirts of the town. Several lines of railway converge here, passing through one principal station belonging to the Lancashire and Yorkshire Rly. Co. Bl. returns two members to Parliament.

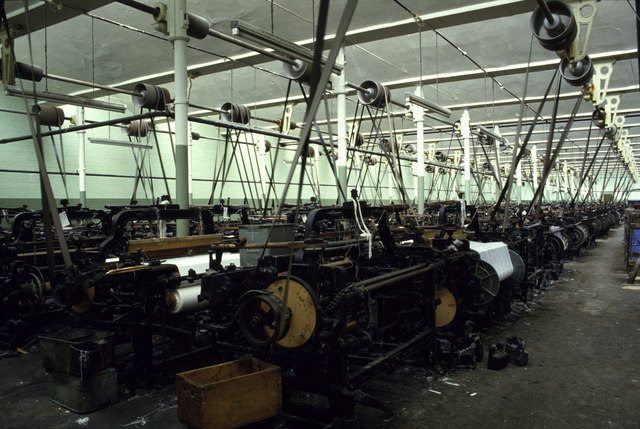
A typical weaving shed at Queen Street Mill Textile Museum, Burnley

From around 1750, cotton textile manufacturing expanded rapidly. Supplied with cotton by merchants, and paid by the piece, cottagers spun cotton into thread and wove it into cloth. The merchants arranged for cloth to be bleached and dyed.

After 1775, spinning mills were built in the town. Early mills were warehouse conversions; the first purpose-built spinning mill was constructed in 1797 and by 1824 there were 24. The number of spindles reached 2.5 million by 1870 and spinning mills were constructed up to that time – 24 since 1850. Spinning declined between 1870 and 1900 as the sector transferred to south Lancashire.

In 18th-century Blackburn, weaving was primarily undertaken by handloom weavers working from their own cottages. However, as powerlooms were introduced into the mills after 1825, the percentage of handloom weavers began to decline and this occurred more rapidly in areas closer to the town. In 1826 the Power-loom riots came through Blackburn in response to the loss of jobs and low wages. Handloom weavers continued to make up a sizeable portion of the workforce in outlying rural areas. The last handloom shop in Blackburn closed in 1894.

=== 1800s ===
Duke Street Mill being destroyed

In 1807, the Daniel Thwaites & Co brewery was established; the company is still in business today and is now based at Sykes Holt in Mellor.

Improvements to the power loom in the early 1840s, and the construction of a railway line in 1846, led to greater investment in power looms in Blackburn in the second half of that decade. The railway brought opportunities for expansion of the cotton trade, and in subsequent decades many new mills were constructed: between 1850 and 1870, sixty-eight weaving-only and four combined weaving/spinning mills were built and nine weaving mills were built per decade between 1870 and 1890.

Improvements in power loom efficiency meant that weaving, the primary source of wealth and income for handloom weavers, began to transfer from the cottage industry to factories. This led to high rates of unemployment: according to figures published in March 1826, some 60% of all handloom weavers in Blackburn and Rishton, Lower Darwen and Oswaldtwistle were unemployed. High unemployment led to the Lancashire weavers' riots. At 3:00 pm on 24 April 1826, a mob arrived in Blackburn after attacking power looms in Accrington. Proceeding to Bannister Eccles' Jubilee Factory on Jubilee Street, the mob destroyed 212 power looms in the space of 35 minutes. They then turned their attention to John Houghton and Sons' Park Place factory, located nearby, and destroyed another 25 looms, before seeking more machinery to attack. The crowd began to disperse at around 6:00 pm, troops having arrived at 3:30 pm to try to quell the rioting.

The Audley Hall Mills, Dickens Street, Blackburn. 1916.

=== 20th-century decline of the cotton industry ===
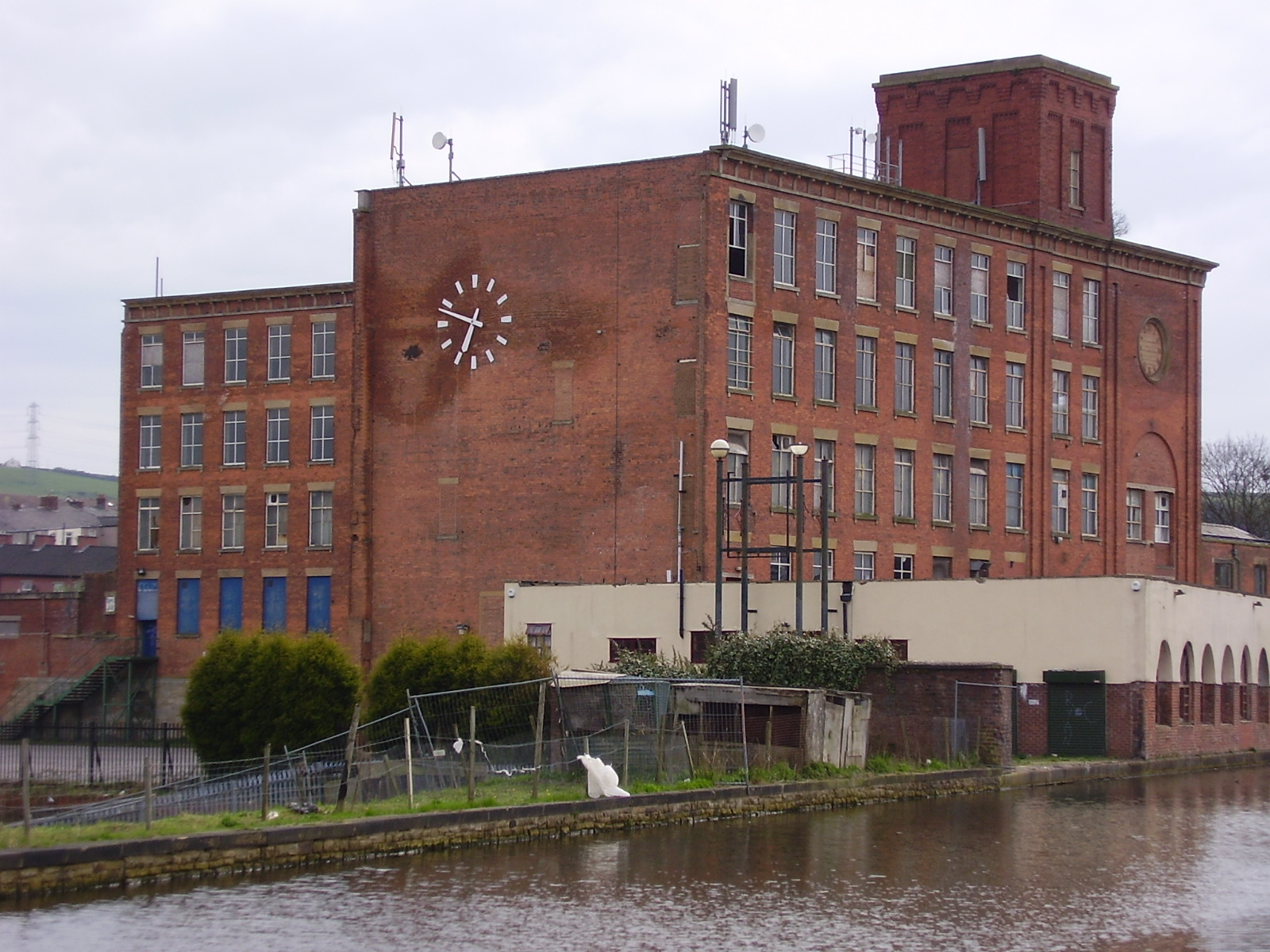
Albion Mill photographed in 2008. The mill ceased production in 1975 and was demolished in 2010.

In 1890, Blackburn's Chamber of Commerce had recognised that the town was overly dependent on the cotton industry, warning of the dangers of "only having one string to their bow in Blackburn." The warning proved prophetic when, in 1904, a slump hit the cotton industry and other industries dependent on it, such as engineering, brewing and building. In 1908, another slump saw 43 mills stop production and a quarter of the town's looms lay idle.

During the First World War suspension of trade with India resulted in the expansion of colonial British India's cotton industry at the expense of Britain's, and the imposition of an 11% import tariff by the colonial British Government led to a dramatic slump in trade in 1921, a situation which worsened in 1922 after the Indian Government raised the tariff to 14%. This caused the number of stopped mills to increase to 47, with 43,000 looms lying idle. Two years into the slump, Foundry and Limbrick Mills became the first to close permanently.

Not long afterwards, the General Strike of 1926 saw production suspended at half of the town's mills and 12,000 unemployed.

In 1927, Matthew Brown & Co. relocated to the town's Lion Brewery, on Coniston Road, following their acquisition of local brewer Nuttall & Co, later the subject of a hostile takeover by Scottish & Newcastle Breweries in 1987, ceasing brewing in 1991.

In 1928, there was another slump in textile production, and another strike in 1929 after employers requested a 12% wage cut; 40,000 cotton workers struck for a week and eight mills closed, making 28 closures in six years. By the start of 1930, 50 mills had shut and 21,000 people were unemployed. A financial crisis in 1931 led to 24,000 unemployed, with 1,000 houses and 166 shops lying empty in the town. A total of 26 mills closed down between 1930 and 1934.

==== 1948 mass fingerprinting ====
Blackburn became the first town to undertake the mass fingerprinting of people following the murder of June Anne Devaney in May 1948. June Anne Devaney was a three-year-old patient at Queens Park Hospital when she was abducted from her cot and murdered in the hospital grounds on 15 May 1948. Fingerprints on a bottle underneath her cot led the police to fingerprint every male over the age of 16 who was present in Blackburn on 14 and 15 May 1948. After taking over 46,500 sets of fingerprints, a match was made with Peter Griffiths, a 22-year-old ex-serviceman. Griffiths admitted his guilt and his trial ascertained if he was sane or not. After deliberating for 23 minutes, the jury found him sane and he was hanged at Liverpool Prison on Friday 19 November 1948. After his conviction, the police destroyed all fingerprints they had taken.

==== 1948–1999 ====
Between 1948 and 1950, the textile industry experienced a short post-war boom, during which sales increased, industry training methods improved and automatic looms were introduced, which allowed a single weaver to control 20 to 25 looms. Loom sheds were rebuilt to house new, larger looms. Despite the post-war boom, the cotton industry continued to decline and only 25% of the town's population were employed in textiles by 1951; this figure had stood at 60% up to the beginning of the Great Depression in 1929. In 1952, the number of weavers fell from 10,890 to 9,020. By 1955 more cloth was imported from India than was exported and between 1955 and 1958 another 16 mills closed. In 1959, due in part to the reorganisation of the textile industry as a result of the Textiles Act, another 17 mills closed. By 1960, there were 30 mills operating in Blackburn.

Closures continued in the 1960s with The Parkside, Fountains, Malvern and Pioneer Mills shutting in 1964. In 1967 the Eclipse Mill at Feniscowles closed, unable to compete with imported cloth sold at nine pence cheaper per yard than the mill could produce. By the end of that year there were 26 mills operating. The 1970s saw further closures, and the number of textile workers in Blackburn reduced to 6,000 by January 1975, the year in which the Albion and Alston mills stopped production with the loss of 400 jobs. In 1976, there were 2,100 looms in operation in the town, compared with 79,405 in 1907.

=== 21st-century revitalisation ===
After continued economic decline in the 2000s, new investment began in the 2010s. In 2015, Scottish designer Patrick Grant rescued Cookson & Clegg, a factory founded in Blackburn in 1860 that was facing closure. The following year he launched the Blackburn-based clothing brand Community Clothing to boost employment in British mills and factories.

The inaugural British Textile Biennial, a month-long festival celebrating textiles through art and exhibitions, was held in Blackburn in 2019. The second edition took place in October 2021; it included an exhibition from Turner Prize winner Lubaina Himid and a film starring Maxine Peake.

In 2021, the Blackburn with Darwen Council proposed a £250 million Blackburn Master Plan to revitalise central Blackburn over the next decade, with the goal of building 500 new homes and creating 1,000 jobs. In 2022, £200 million in government, council and private investments were announced for the revitalisations of the town centres in both Blackburn and Darwen. The Townscape Heritage Project will create a new cultural quarter in Blackburn's historic town centre. Councillor Phil Riley stated that additional investment over the next decade could lead to 100,000 jobs in the borough.

==== St Peter's Burial Ground ====
During late 2015, work done on St Peter's Burial Ground in advance of road construction involved disinterring the remains of nearly 2,000 individuals buried there during the cemetery's period of operation (1821–1945). The burial ground had been connected with the former St Peter's Church, a large one that seated some 1,500 people, which was demolished in 1976. Archaeologists found that nearly half of the bodies were those of young children, who appeared to have died quickly during the mid-19th century from illnesses affected the lungs and gastrointestinal system. The numbers are taken as reflecting the massive increase in the city's population during that period due to its booming textile industry, which led to unhealthy living situations among the working classes.

The remains were to be relocated to another section of the cemetery. A memorial service conducted by Julian Henderson, the Bishop of Blackburn, for those being reburied was scheduled to be held during the summer of 2016.

== Governance ==
Blackburn is administered by Blackburn with Darwen unitary authority, which encompasses Blackburn and the small town of Darwen to the south. The town sends one MP to the House of Commons.

=== Parliamentary representation ===
The historic constituency of Blackburn was created for the 1832 general election and sent two MPs to Westminster, until it was abolished in 1950 and replaced for one parliamentary term by two new single-member constituencies, Blackburn East and Blackburn West. At the 1955 general election, Blackburn East and Blackburn West were merged into the current Blackburn constituency, which is relatively tightly formed and returns a single MP.

Until 2015, the MP was the former Foreign Secretary Jack Straw.

=== Local government ===
Blackburn council and its successor have been predominantly controlled by the Labour Party since 1945 and continuously for 19 years until May 2007, when it fell under no overall control. In 2008, the constituency of Blackburn was characterised as "a mix of deprived inner-city wards dominated by Muslim voters, white working class areas and Conservative voting suburbs."

The distribution of seats, as of May 2018, was 44 seats for Labour, 17 for the Conservatives and three for the Liberal Democrats.

The council has been elected "by thirds" since 1996 (Note: One councillor from each of the three-member wards is elected in each of three years of four; candidates in two member wards are elected in two years of four. No elections are required in the other years of the four-year cycle.)

==== History ====
In its 2007 Comprehensive Performance Assessment (CPA), the Audit Commission described the council as "improving well" and gave it the highest four star overall performance rating.

Although children's services, adult social care and GCSE results were praised, the commission highlighted "significant health problems" and increased "levels of repeat victims of domestic violence" as causes for concern. Despite generally good performance, overall user satisfaction levels with the council are below average and not improving. The borough has Beacon Council status and shares its best practice in education policy with other councils as part of the scheme.

In July 1992, white and Asian youths rioted for several nights in Blackburn, as a newsagents in Brookhouse was set on fire and police had to disperse "small groups of white youths attempting to join a confrontation between the town's ethnic minorities."

The next resurgence of support for the far right came in 2002; the incumbent Liberal Democrats were pushed into third place behind Labour. Commenting on the elections, Blackburn MP Jack Straw said: "It is very sad. We had the far right in Blackburn 26 years ago, when they won two seats in Shadsworth, but there the whole community decided they wouldn't have it. You can never say they won't put candidates in Blackburn, but we will work hard on community relations."

Prior to 2008, the council had two members for the England First party: Mark Cotterill for Meadowhead ward and Michael Johnson for Fernhurst; Cotterill has since stood down and Johnson joined the For Darwen party. Members of the BNP won a council seat in the town in November 2002, following elections in May which saw three of their colleagues elected in nearby Burnley. The BNP's Robin Evans secured a 16-vote majority in Mill Hill ward with two recounts following a campaign using pub meetings and leafleting. Robin Evans resigned from the party in October 2003.

=== Coat of arms ===
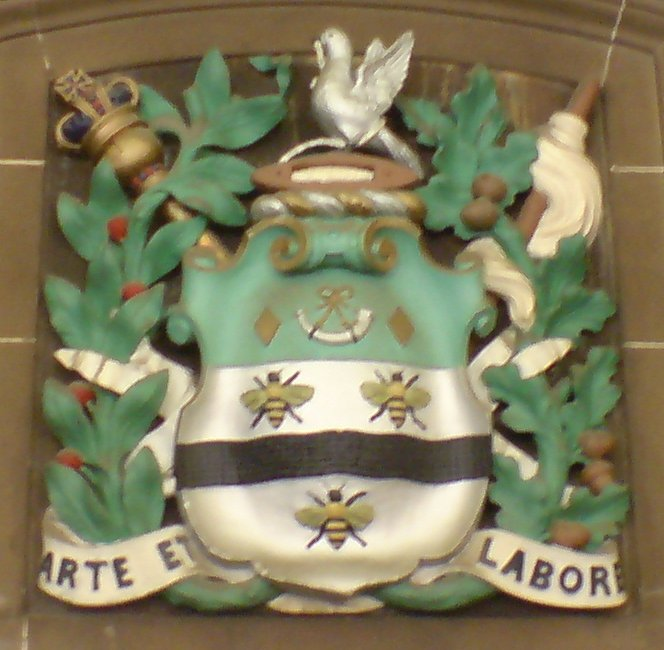
Arms of the former Blackburn Borough Council on display in the Town Hall

The coat of arms of the former Blackburn Borough Council has many distinctive emblems. The blazon of the arms is: Argent a Fesse wavy Sable between three Bees volant proper on a Chief Vert a Bugle stringed Argent between two Fusils Or. On the crest, a Wreath of the Colours a Shuttle Or thereon a Dove wings elevated Argent and holding in the beak the Thread of the Shuttle reflexed over the back and an Olive Branch proper. The Latin motto of the town is Arte et Labore, correctly translated as "By art and by labour, but is often translated as "By skill and hard work."

The motto, granted on 14 February 1852 to the former Borough of Blackburn, is poignant as Blackburn, once a small town, had risen to importance through the energy and enterprise of her spinners and manufacturers, combined with the skill and labour of her operatives. The Borough of Blackburn was formed by the amalgamation of the County Borough of Blackburn, the Borough of Darwen, part of the Turton Urban District and the parishes of Yate and Pickup Bank, Eccleshill, Livesey, Pleasington and Tockholes from the Blackburn Rural District.

== Geography ==
Blackburn

Climate chart (precipitation, max. and min. temperature)
J	F	M	A	M	J	J	A	S	O	N	D
70 6 1	50 7 1	60 9 3	50 12 4	60 15 7	70 18 10	70 20 12	80 20 12	70 17 10	80 14 8	80 9 4	80 7 2
- █ Average max. and min. temperatures in °C
- █ Precipitation totals in mm
- Source: "Records and averages". Yahoo! Weather. 2007. Archived from the original on 8 June 2011.
Imperial conversion
J	F	M	A	M	J	J	A	S	O	N	D
2.8 43 34	2 45 34	2.4 48 37	2 54 39	2.4 59 45	2.8 64 50	2.8 68 54	3.1 68 54	2.8 63 50	3.1 57 46	3.1 48 39	3.1 45 36
- █ Average max. and min. temperatures in °F
- █ Precipitation totals in inches

Blackburn lies 122 metres (401 ft) above sea level, 9 miles (14 km) east of Preston and 21 miles (34 km) north-north-east of Manchester. The Ribble Valley and West Pennine Moors lie to the north and south respectively. Blackburn experiences a temperate maritime climate, like much of the British Isles, with relatively cool summers and mild winters. There is regular but generally light precipitation throughout the year.

Although the City of Preston, the administrative centre for Lancashire, is located about 9 miles (14 km) west, Blackburn is the largest municipality in East Lancashire. The town is bounded on other sides by the towns of Accrington to the east and Darwen to the south. The village of Wilpshire is 2 1/2 miles (4 km) north of Blackburn and is partly contiguous (development-touching) however in the Ribble Valley local government district. Other nearby villages are Langho, approximately 1 1/4 miles (2 km) north-east and Mellor to the north-west.

The towns of Rishton, to the east, and Great Harwood, to the north-east, are both in the local government district of Hyndburn. The town of Burnley lies 11 miles (18 km) to the east.

=== Geology and terrain ===
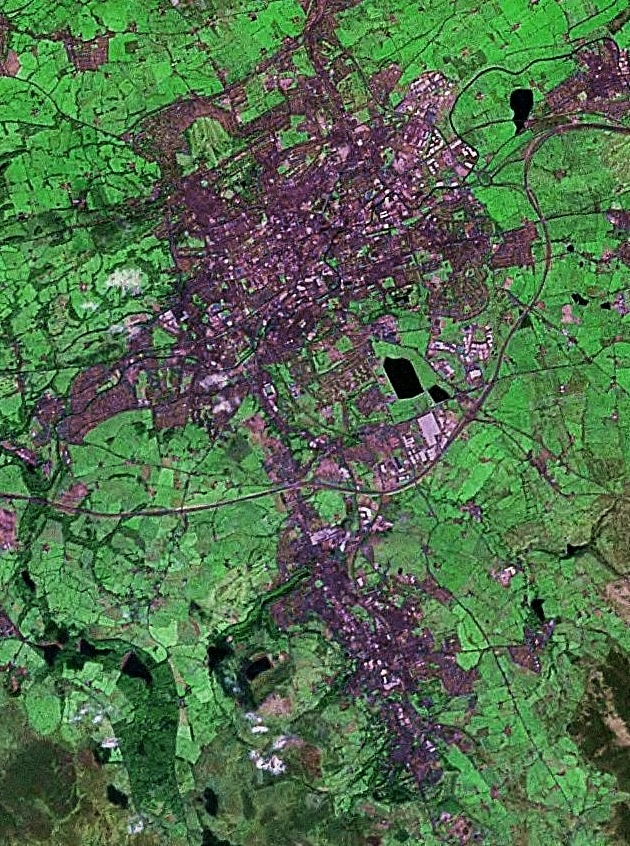
Blackburn and the southern town of Darwen as viewed from space by the Landsat 7 satellite in 2000 (false colour image)

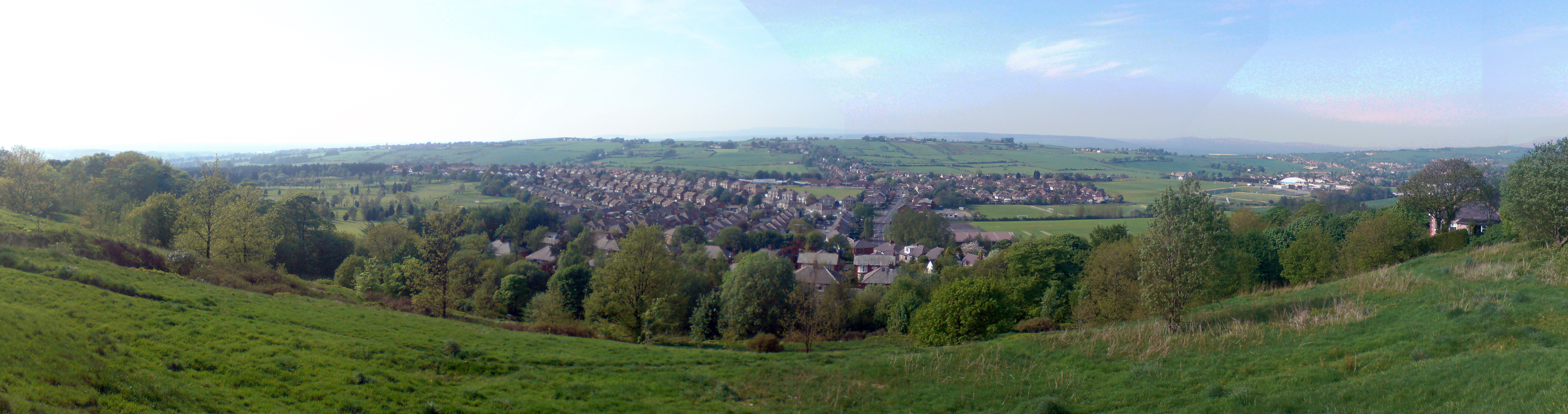
View north over Lammack and Pleckgate from one of the highest points in Blackburn at the site of the old water tank at Revidge

Located in the midst of the East Lancashire Hills, some areas of the town are characterised by steep slopes. The town centre centres in a plain of 91–110 m (299–361 ft) above sea level surrounded by hills. The Revidge to the north can be reached via a steep climb up Montague Street and Dukes Brow to reach a peak of 218 metres (715 ft) above sea level. (Note: The centre of the ridge is covered by the town's main cricket ground and Corporation park.)

To the west, the wooded Billinge Hill in Witton Country Park is 245 metres (804 ft) high, while Royal Blackburn Teaching Hospital is situated to the east of the town at a vantage point of 202 metres (663 ft). These figures can be considered in the context of other hills and mountains in Lancashire, including Great Hill at 381 metres (1,250 ft), Winter Hill at 456 metres (1,496 ft), Pendle Hill at 557 metres (1,827 ft) and Green Hill at 628 metres (2,060 ft).

The River Blakewater, which gives its names to the town, flows down from the moors above Guide and then through the areas of Whitebirk, Little Harwood, Cob Wall and Brookhouse to the town centre. The river is culverted and runs underground in the town centre, under Ainsworth Street and between Blackburn Cathedral and the Boulevard. On the western side of the town centre the Blakewater continues through the Wensley Fold area before joining the river Darwen outside Witton Country Park; the Darwen flows into the river Ribble at Walton-le-Dale.

The geology of the Blackburn area yields numerous resources which underpinned its development as a centre of manufacturing during the Industrial Revolution. Mineable coal seams have been used since the mid-to-late 16th century.

The Coal Measures in the area overlie the Millstone Grit which has been quarried in the past for millstones and, along with local limestone deposits, used as a construction material for roads and buildings. In addition, there were deposits of iron ore in the Furness and Ulverston districts.

The Blackburn area was subjected to glaciation during the Pleistocene ice age, and the sandstone-and-shale bedrock is overlain in much of the area by glacial deposits called till (which is also called "boulder clay") of varying thickness up to several tens of feet. Glacial outwash (sand and gravel) also occur in small patches, including along Grimshaw Brook.

=== Green belt ===
Blackburn is within a green belt region that extends into the wider surrounding counties, and is in place to reduce urban sprawl, prevent the towns in the nearby Greater Manchester and Merseyside conurbations from further convergence, protect the identity of outlying communities, encourage brownfield reuse, and preserve nearby countryside. This is achieved by restricting inappropriate development within the designated areas and imposing stricter conditions on permitted building.

Sizeable areas of green belt exist within the borough, west and south of Blackburn surrounding Witton Country Park and Pleasington parish, with other parishes in the borough containing portions of green belt, Tockholes, Eccleshill, Yate and Pickup Bank parish, Livesy, Darwen, with North Turton largely covered. The green belt was first drawn up in 1982 under Lancashire County Council and the size in the borough in 2017 amounted to 5,260 hectares (13,000 acres).

== Demography ==
At the time of the UK Government's 2001 census, Blackburn, defined as an urban area, had a population of 105,085 and a population density of 11,114/sq mi (4,291/km^{2}). According to further statistics from the same census, this time defining Blackburn as a Westminster parliamentary constituency, the population was 69.22% White British (national average for England 89.99%) with significant Pakistani (14.31%) and Indian (11.45%) ethnic minorities. 12.33% of the population was born outside the European Union. In terms of religion, 57.53% of residents were Christian (average for England 71.74%), 25.74% Muslim (average for England 3.1%) and 15.98% no religion or not stated.

With regard to the economic activity of those aged 16–74, the 2001 Census indicates that 33.93% were full-time employees (average for England 40.81%), 11.72% part-timers, 5.97% self-employed (the average for England 8.32%) and 4.5% unemployed (average for England 3.35%).

The 2001 census also records the social grade of the constituency's 72,418 people aged 16 and over: using the NRS social grades system, 10,748 were classed as AB (higher and intermediate managerial/administrative/professional), 17,514 as C1 (supervisory, clerical, junior managerial/administrative/professional), 11,691 as C2 (skilled manual workers), 19,212 as D (semi-skilled and unskilled manual workers) and 13,253 as E (on state benefit, unemployed, lowest grade workers).

Additionally, Blackburn with Darwen Borough Council manages a site for gypsies and travellers in the Ewood area of the town.

In the 2021 census, the population of Blackburn with Darwen was 154,922, according to mid-2021 population figures published by the ONS. Blackburn with Darwen's population growth rate between mid-2020 and mid-2021 was 0.2% per year. Blackburn with Darwen covers an area of 53 square miles (140 km^{2}) and has a population density of 437 square miles (1,131 km^{2}) people, based on the latest population estimates taken in mid-2021.

According to the latest 2021 census, the population in Blackburn with Darwen is predominantly white (60%), with non-White minorities representing the remaining 40% of the population. The largest religious group in Blackburn with Darwen is Christian, who account for 38% of the population.

English is spoken as the main language by 87.5% of people in Blackburn with Darwen, and spoken either well or very well by 8% of the population. 3.4% reported having poor English language skills and the remaining 0.8% spoke no English at all.

=== Ethnicity ===
Ethnic Group	Year													
Ethnic Group	1961 estimations		1971 estimations		1981 estimations		1991 census		2001 census		2011 census		2021 census	
Ethnic Group	Number	%	Number	%	Number	%	Number	%	Number	%	Number	%	Number	%
White: Total	–	–	–	–	121,847	89.2%	116,142	84.2%	107,124	78%	102,009	69.1%	93,392	60.4%
White: British (Note: New category created for the 2001 census.)	–	–	–	–	–	–	–	–	104,629	76.1	98,144	66.5	87,997	56.9%
White: Irish	–	–	–	–	–	–	–	–	1,172	0.9	794	0.5	589	0.4%
White: Gypsy or Irish Traveller (Note: New category created for the 2001 census.)	–	–	–	–	–	–	–	–	–	–	161	0.1	101	0.1%
White: Roma	–	–	–	–	–	–	–	–	–	–			143	0.1%
White: Other (Note: New category created for the 2001 census.)	–	–	–	–	–	–	–	–	1,323	1.0	2,910	2.0	4,562	2.9%
Asian or Asian British: Total	–	0.2%	–	4.3%	13,646	10%	20,192	14.6%	28,588	20.8%	41,494	28.1%	55,178	35.8%
Asian or Asian British: Indian	–	–	–	–	7,485	5.5%	10,824	7.8%	14,654	10.7	19,791	13.4	24,389	15.8%
Asian or Asian British: Pakistani	–	–	–	–	5,468	4%	8,299	6%	12,020	8.7	17,801	12.1	27,525	17.8%
Asian or Asian British: Bangladeshi	–	–	–	–	158		316		523	0.4	1,525	1.0	1,473	1.0%
Asian or Asian British: Chinese (Note: Listed under the 'Other ethnic group' heading in 2001.)	–	–	–	177		237		204	0.1	721	0.5	400	0.3%	
Asian or Asian British: Other Asian	–	–	–	–	358		516		1,187	0.9	1,656	1.1	1,391	0.9%
Black or Black British: Total	–	–	–	–	444	0.3%	606	0.4%	318	0.2%	933	0.6%	1,406	0.9%
Black or Black British: African	–	–	–	–	145		178		183	0.1	614	0.4	1,061	0.7%
Black or Black British: Caribbean	–	–	–	–	73		100		106	0.1	202	0.1	170	0.1%
Black or Black British: Other Black	–	–	–	–	226		328		29	0.0	117	0.1	175	0.1%
Mixed or British Mixed: Total (Note: New category created for the 2001 census.)/>	–	–	–	–	–	–	–	–	1,262	0.9%	1,823	1.2%	2,596	1.6%
Mixed: White and Black Caribbean	–	–	–	–	–	–	–	–	200	0.1	315	0.2	368	0.2%
Mixed: White and Black African	–	–	–	–	–	–	–	–	109	0.1	162	0.1	231	0.1%
Mixed: White and Asian	–	–	–	–	–	–	–	–	703	0.5	989	0.7	1,329	0.9%
Mixed: Other Mixed	–	–	–	–	–	–	–	–	250	0.2	357	0.2	668	0.4%
Other: Total	–	–	–	–	678	0.5%	960	0.8%	178	0.1%	1,230	0.8%	2,169	1.4%
Other: Arab (Note: New category created for the 2001 census.)	–	–	–	–	–	–	–	–	–	–	585	0.4	841	0.5%
Other: Any other ethnic group	–	–	–	–	678	0.5%	960	0.8%	178	0.1	645	0.4	1,328	0.9%
Non-White: Total	–	–	–	–	14,768	10.8%	21,758	15.8%					61,349	39.6%
Total	–	–	–	100%	136,615	100%	137,900	100%	137,470	100%	147,489	100%	154,741	100%

== Economy ==
As of 2007, the town centre was subject to a multi-million pound investment. Blackburn with Darwen Council made some refurbishments and renovations of key public places, notably the Church Street area with its Grade II listed classical style Waterloo Pavilions complemented by street furniture and sculptures. As of 2006, The Mall Blackburn (formerly known as Blackburn Shopping Centre) was the main shopping centre in Blackburn with over 130 shops and 400 further outlets close by.

In June 2011, Blackburn Market opened in a new site under the shopping centre and opened six days a week (Monday–Saturday). The previous market was based on the other side of Ainsworth Street. It first opened on this site in 1964, where there was a three-day market (Wednesday, Friday and Saturday) and the Market Hall (Monday–Saturday).

In May 2008, one of the town's most well-known shops, the shoe store Tommy Ball's, closed due to insolvency. The town's oldest store, Mercer & Sons, also closed after a decline in sales blamed on the credit crunch. It opened in 1840 and was originally an ironmonger, but it converted to selling toys, household goods and hardware. In January 2009, the directors of the company announced that the shop would close after a 30-day statutory consultation, unless they changed their minds or a buyer was found.

Markets continue to offer a wide range of local produce, such as Lancashire cheeses, tripe, Bowland beef and lamb. Walsh's Sarsaparilla stall decided not to join the move into the Mall shopping centre in 2011, and opens six days a week.

Major employers in the town include:

- Blackburn College
- Thwaites Brewery
- BAE Systems at its Samlesbury Aerodrome site, to the north-west
- Blackburn with Darwen Borough Council
- East Lancashire Hospitals NHS Trust, based at the Royal Blackburn Hospital).

Drumstone Trade Park, near the town centre. has trade outlets.

== Transport ==
=== Railway ===
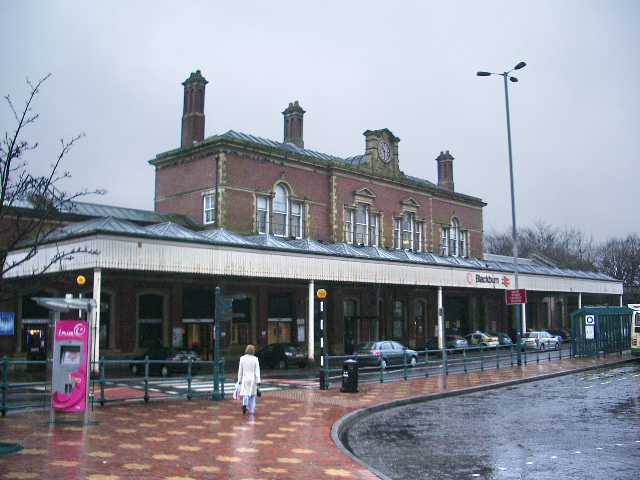
Blackburn station building and forecourt

Blackburn railway station is sited in the town centre and is managed by Northern Trains, which also operates all of its passenger services. It lies on two lines:

- Ribble Valley line between Clitheroe and Manchester Victoria; trains to Manchester typically take around 50 minutes and continue on to Rochdale
- East Lancashire Line services eastwards to Burnley, Colne, Leeds and York; services westwards go to Preston and Blackpool North.

=== Buses ===
Blackburn's new bus station in Ainsworth Street opened in May 2016. A new interchange was built outside the station as part of the Cathedral Quarter redevelopment.

Routes are operated by Blackburn Bus Company, Vision Bus, Stagecoach Cumbria and North Lancashire Travel Assist and Moving People; these connect the town with Darwen, Accrington, Bolton, Chorley, Clitheroe and Preston.

=== Air ===
Manchester Airport, the busiest airport in the UK outside London, provides scheduled flights. It is located about 28 mi (45 km) south-east of the town.

=== Waterways ===
The Leeds and Liverpool Canal runs through Blackburn from Feniscowles in the south-west to Whitebirk in the north-east, skirting the town centre to the east of Blackburn station. This important early industrial artery arrived in 1810 and became the chief focus for industrial growth in the 19th century, with raw cotton imported via Liverpool. While it suffered neglect in the wake of the area's industrial decline, the Blackburn stretch has benefited from a number of regeneration projects since the 1990s. British Waterways residential moorings are to be found at Finnington Lane Bridge on the western edge of the borough.

=== Roads ===
The M65 motorway passes to the south of Blackburn. It runs from Colne, about 17 mi (27 km) north-east of the town, to a point close to the village of Lostock Hall near Preston, about 12 mi (19 km) west. Junction six of the motorway is located at the eastern edge of Blackburn, near the Intack area; junctions five and four are located to the south, near the village of Guide and the Lower Darwen area, respectively; and junction three is located at the south-western edge of the town, close to the Feniscowles area. The M65 links Blackburn to the national motorway network, connecting to junction nine of the M61 and junction 29 of the M6.

Other major roads in and around Blackburn include the A666 and the A677. The A666 runs from the A59 near the village of Langho, some 3 3/4 mi (6 km) north-west of Blackburn. It passes through the town centre and continues south through the towns of Darwen and Bolton, then south-west to the town of Pendlebury, near Manchester, where it joins the A6 at Irlams o' th' Height. The A677 runs from the east part of Blackburn, about 1 1/2 mi (2.5 km) from the centre. It passes through the centre of the town and continues to the western outskirts. It then heads north-west to the village of Mellor Brook before continuing west towards the city of Preston. It joins the A59 about 5 1/2 miles (9 km) west of Blackburn, about halfway between Blackburn and Preston. Barbara Castle Way, named after the former local MP, runs from Montague Street to Eanam Roundabout; it passes close to the town centre as part of the A6078 town centre orbital route.

== Landmarks ==
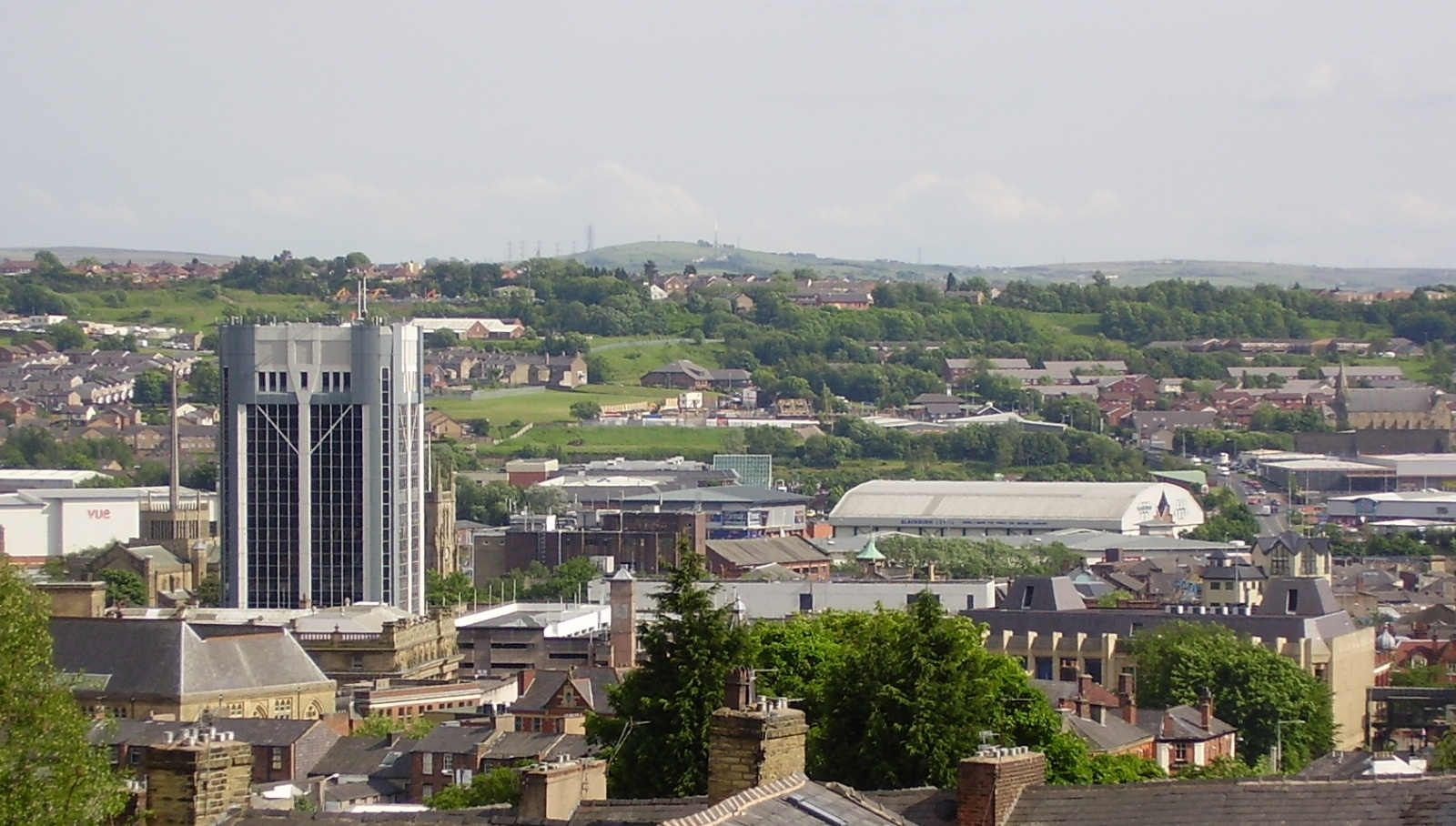
Blackburn skyline with the cathedral and Town Hall Tower

=== Cathedral ===
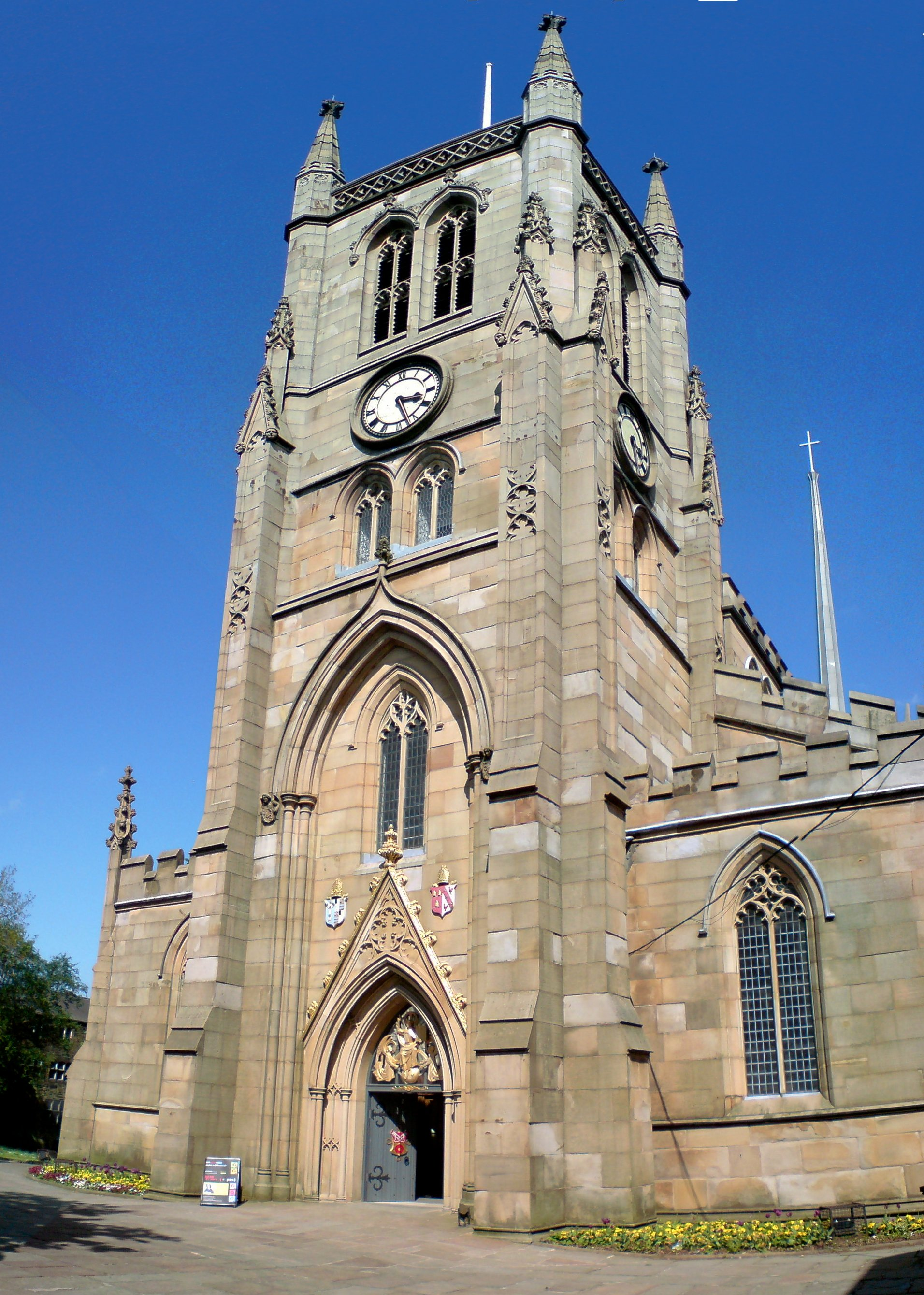
Blackburn Cathedral is sited in the middle of the town centre

The cathedral was formerly St Mary's parish church. It was reconsecrated in 1826 on the site of a previous church that had stood for several hundred years. In 1926, the Diocese of Blackburn was created and the church gained cathedral status. Blackburn was selected above other locations for the new wave of Archbishop Temple's cathedrals because of its then excellent public transport infrastructure – the cathedral stands next to the bus and railway station. (Note: Both interchanges have been reduced in scale since.) Between the 1930s and 1960s, an enlarged cathedral was built using the existing building as the nave. Six of the cathedral's bells were cast in 1737 and are claimed to derive from even older bells. An image of the cathedral is used behind BBC interviews filmed at BBC Radio Lancashire in Darwen Street, opposite the cathedral.

=== Ewood Park ===
The ground was opened in AprIl 1882. Work on the redeveloped, all-seater stadium got underway in February 1993 when the old Darwen End stand was demolished. This stand, with the old Blackburn End stand, was redeveloped before the Nuttall Street stand was also demolished ready for redevelopment in January 1994. Almost two years later, on 18 November 1995, the new stadium was officially opened. With a capacity of 31,367, it consists of four sections: the Darwen End, Riverside Stand (so named as it stands on the banks of the River Darwen), Blackburn End and the Jack Walker Stand, named after the late local industrialist and club supporter. The stadium also has conference and banqueting facilities.

=== Queen Victoria's statue ===
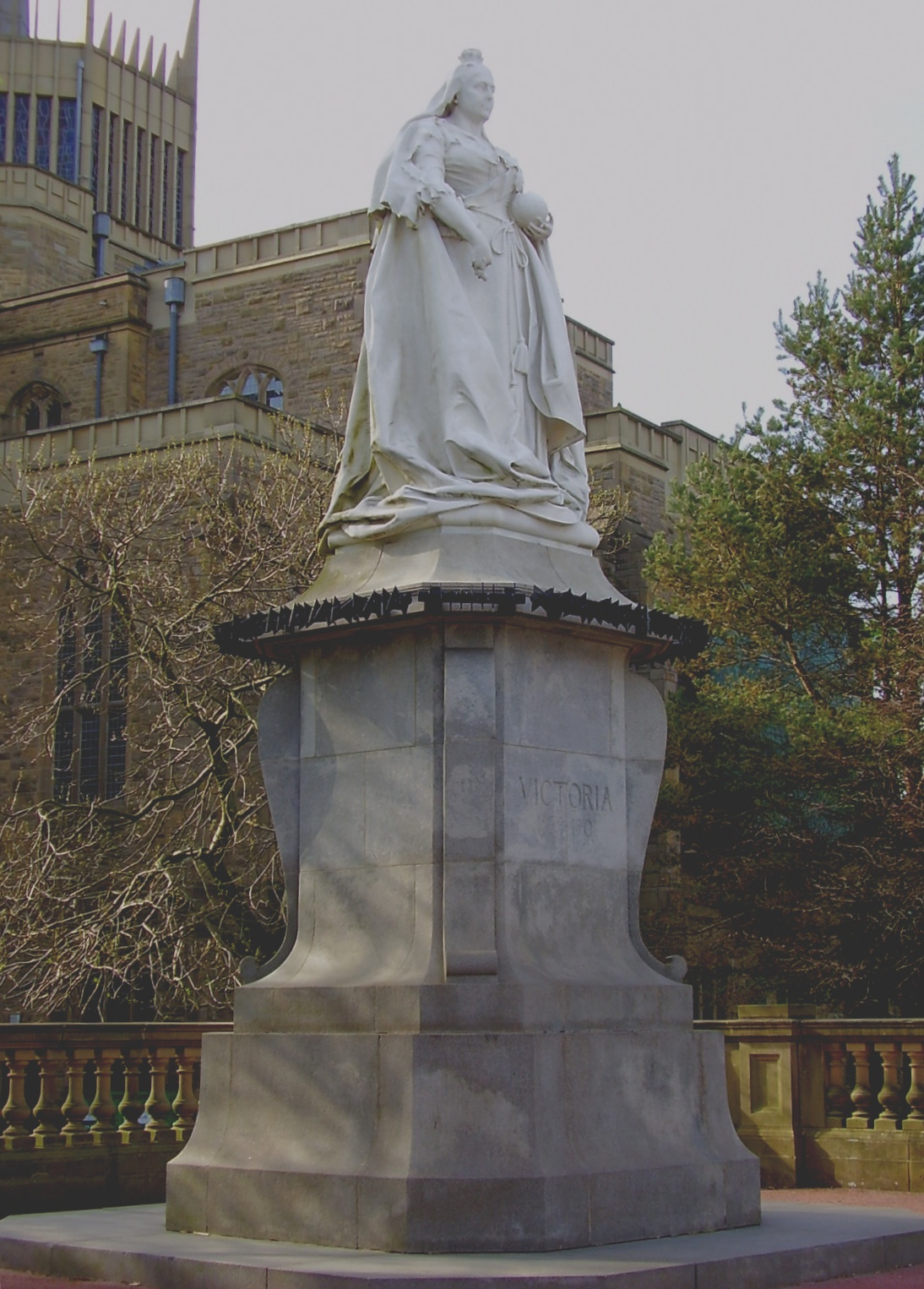
Blackburn's Statue of Queen Victoria with the cathedral in the background

Blackburn's statue of Queen Victoria stands next to the cathedral grounds overlooking the Cathedral Square. Victoria's fourth daughter, Princess Louise, Duchess of Argyll, unveiled the statue on 30 September 1905. It was sculpted by the Australian Sir Bertram Mackennal out of white Sicilian marble and stands on a grey granite plinth. It is 11 feet (3.4 m) high and weighs nine long tons (nine tonnes), while the plinth is 14 feet (4.3 m) high and weighs 30 long tons (30 tonnes).

=== Town Hall ===
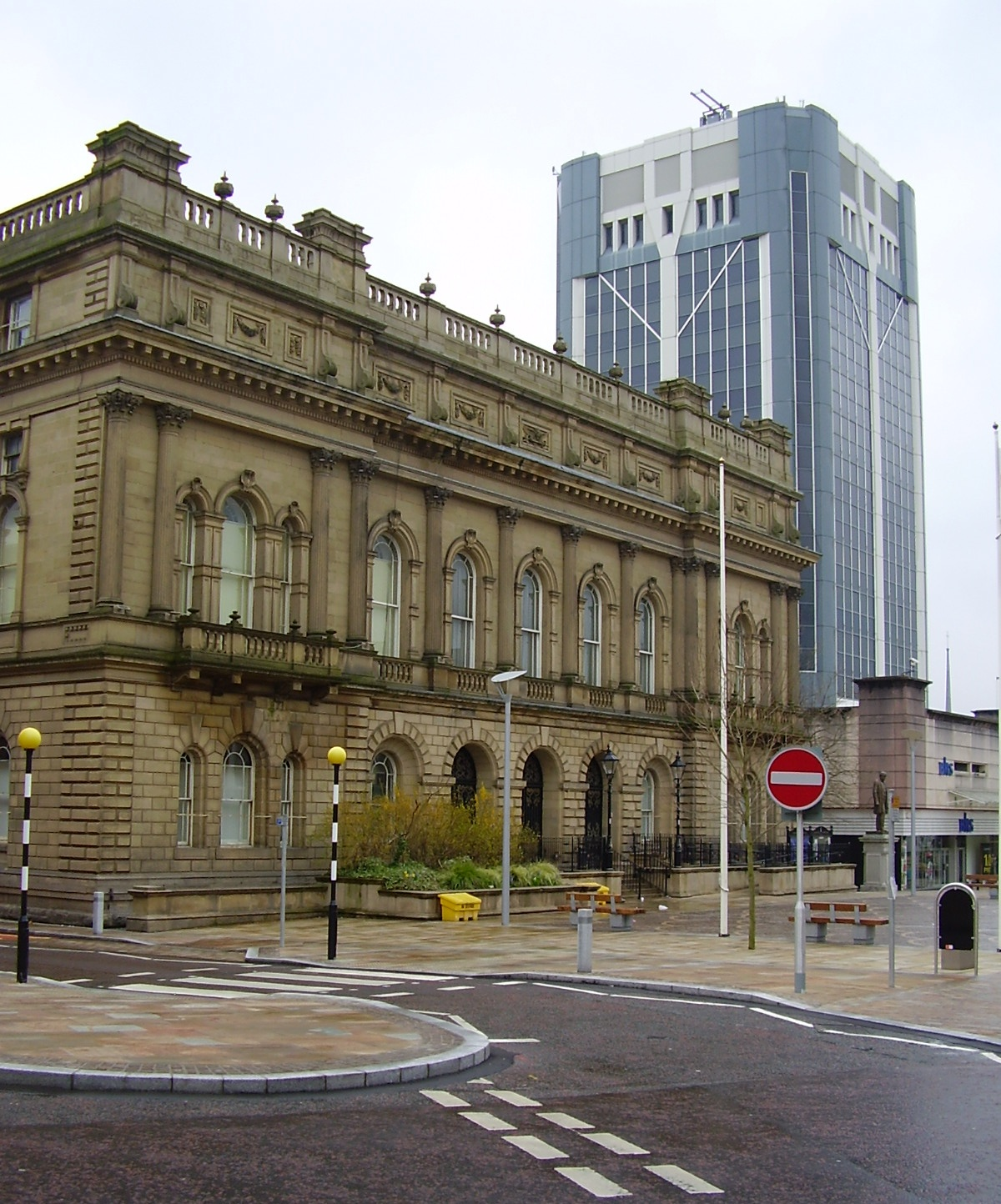
The Italianate 19th-century Old Town Hall and its 1960s counterpart, the reclad New Town Hall

The construction of Blackburn's original, Italian Renaissance style Town Hall was completed in 1856 at a cost of £35,000, equivalent to about £1.5 million as at 2008. The architect was James Paterson and the contractors were Richard Hacking and William Stones. It originally housed a police station with 18 cells, a large assembly room and a council chamber. A tower block extension was constructed in 1969 at a cost of £650,000, equal to about £6.6 million as at 2008.

The tower block is not strictly an extension to the earlier building: the two buildings are connected only by an elevated, enclosed footbridge. The tower block was 198 ft (60.4 m) high and the top was 545 ft 9 in (166.3 m) above sea-level when built, although it has since been re-clad and these figures may have altered slightly. The two buildings are known locally as the New Town Hall and Old Town Hall respectively.

=== Technical school ===
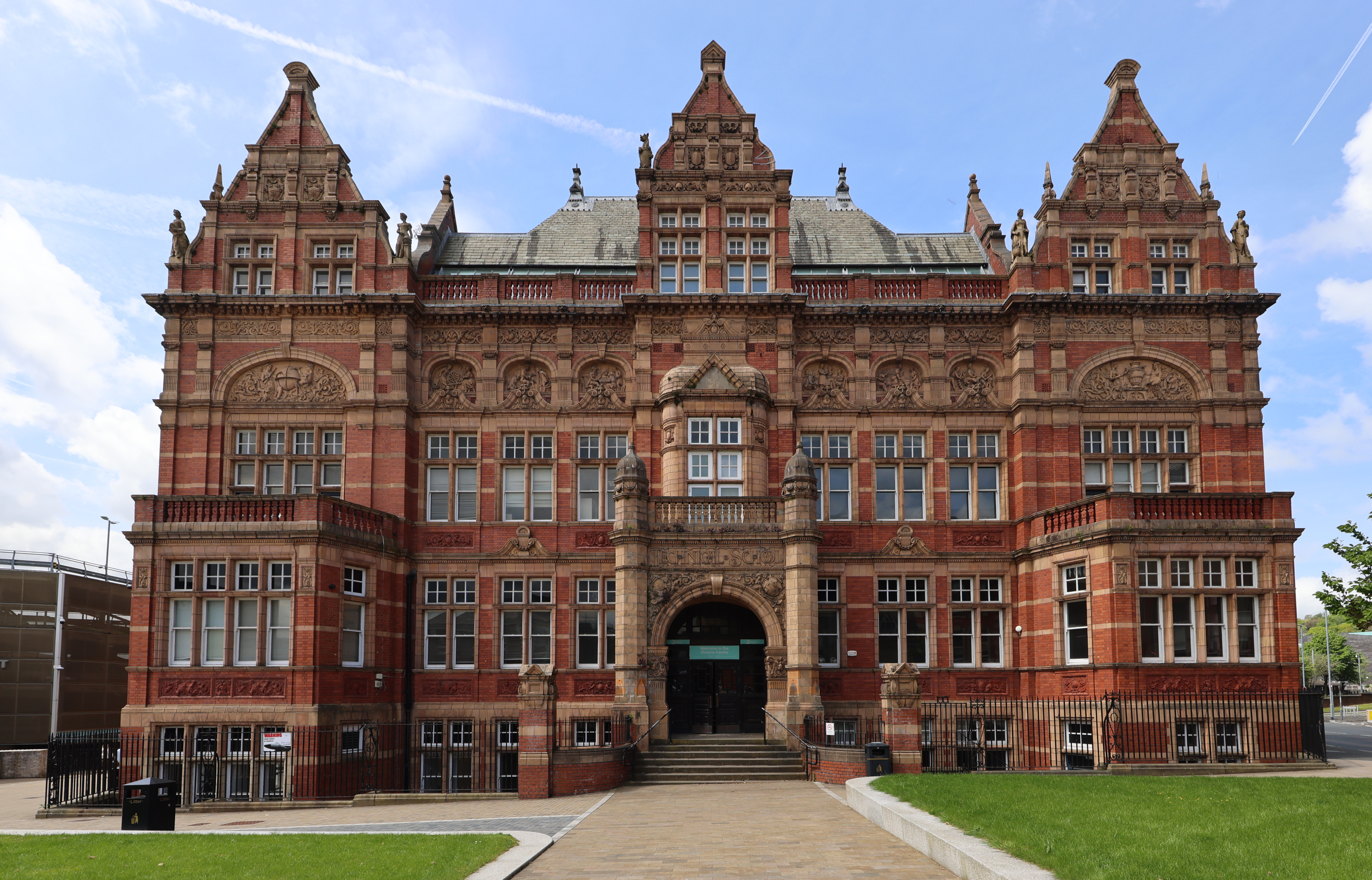
Blackburn's 19th-century Technical School

The school was built in the Northern Renaissance style and has a slate roof, an attic, a basement and two intermediate storeys. Made mainly of red brick and yellow terra cotta, it is profusely decorated. There are ornate gables, a round-arched entrance with angled turrets and balcony above; in addition, there is a frieze below the top storey with panels depicting art and craft skills. A Grade II listed building, it is now part of Blackburn College. The Prince of Wales placed a time capsule in the wall of the college during his visit. The college celebrated its 125th anniversary in 2013.

=== Cotton Exchange ===
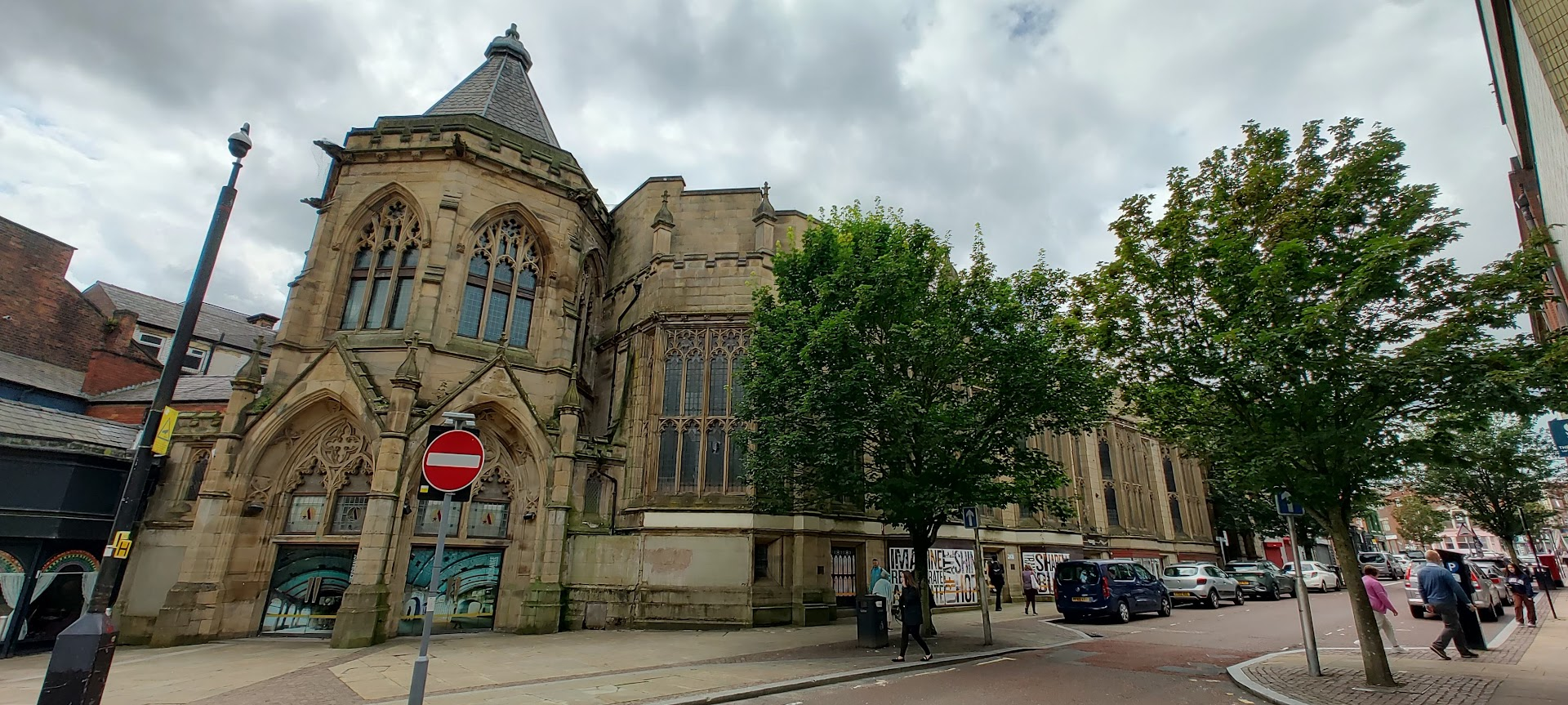
Blackburn Cotton Exchange Building

The Cotton Exchange was built in 1865 as a trading point for the local cotton industry. Designed by William Brakspear, the building was repurposed in 1881 to make it more suitable as a performance hall. In 1918, it was refurbished as a cinema and continued to serve this purpose until its closure in 2005. The building was bought by the Re:Source charity in 2015 and has since hosted events such as the National Festival of Making, Adidas' Spezial Exhibition, and the Confessional Music and Arts Festival.

=== Other landmarks ===
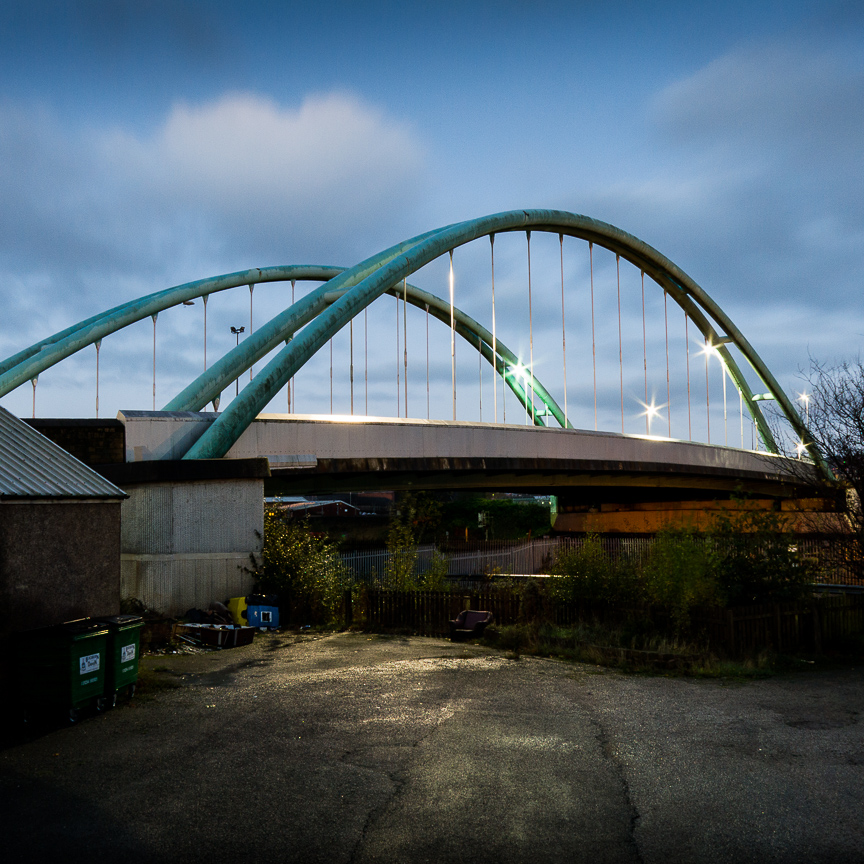
Wainwright Bridge, October 2017

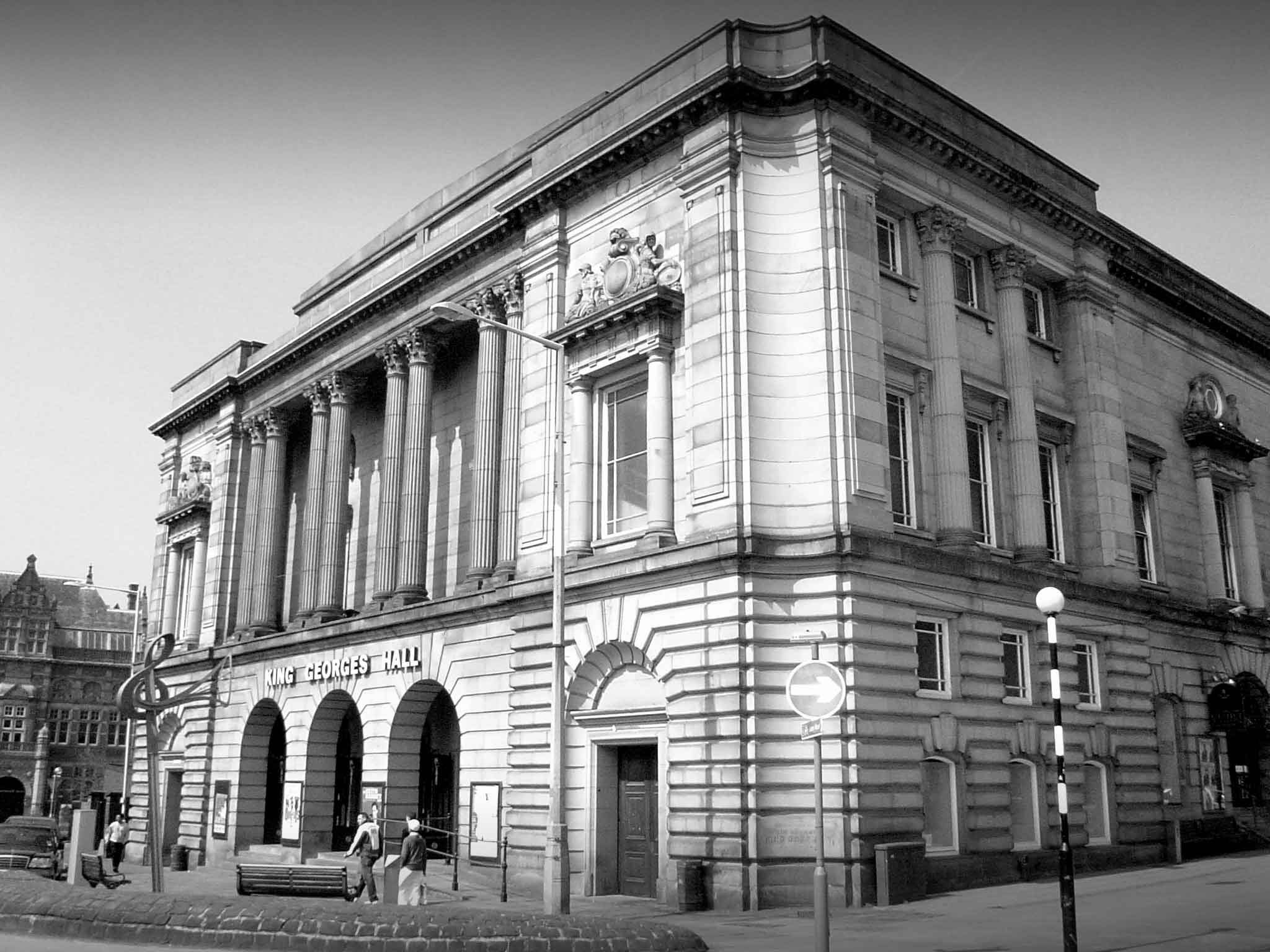
King George's Hall

The Wainwright Bridge was opened in June 2008. The £12 million bowstring arch bridge crosses the East Lancashire and Ribble Valley railway lines west of the town centre and forms part of the A6078 Town Centre Orbital Route. The bridge is named after Alfred Wainwright, after a vote by the townspeople. Blackburn Arena, opened in 1991, houses an ice rink and is home to the Blackburn Hawks ice hockey team.

Blackburn railway station features a 24-foot (7.3 m) mural by the Ormskirk-based artist Stephen Charnock. It shows eight famous faces associated with the town, including Mohandas Gandhi, who visited nearby Darwen in 1931. The station was renovated in 2000.

BBC Radio Lancashire has its studios in Darwen Street in the town centre. Thwaites Brewery, which produces cask ale, has had a position in the centre of the town since 1870. There is also King George's Hall, which is an arts and entertainment centre and Thwaites Empire Theatre. A section of the Leeds and Liverpool Canal runs through the town. St Anne's Roman Catholic Church, also situated in the centre of the town, is a Lombard Romanesque church, built in 1926; it was destroyed by arson in 2002 and rebuilt in 2004. The Canterbury Street drill hall was completed in 1870.

=== Parks ===
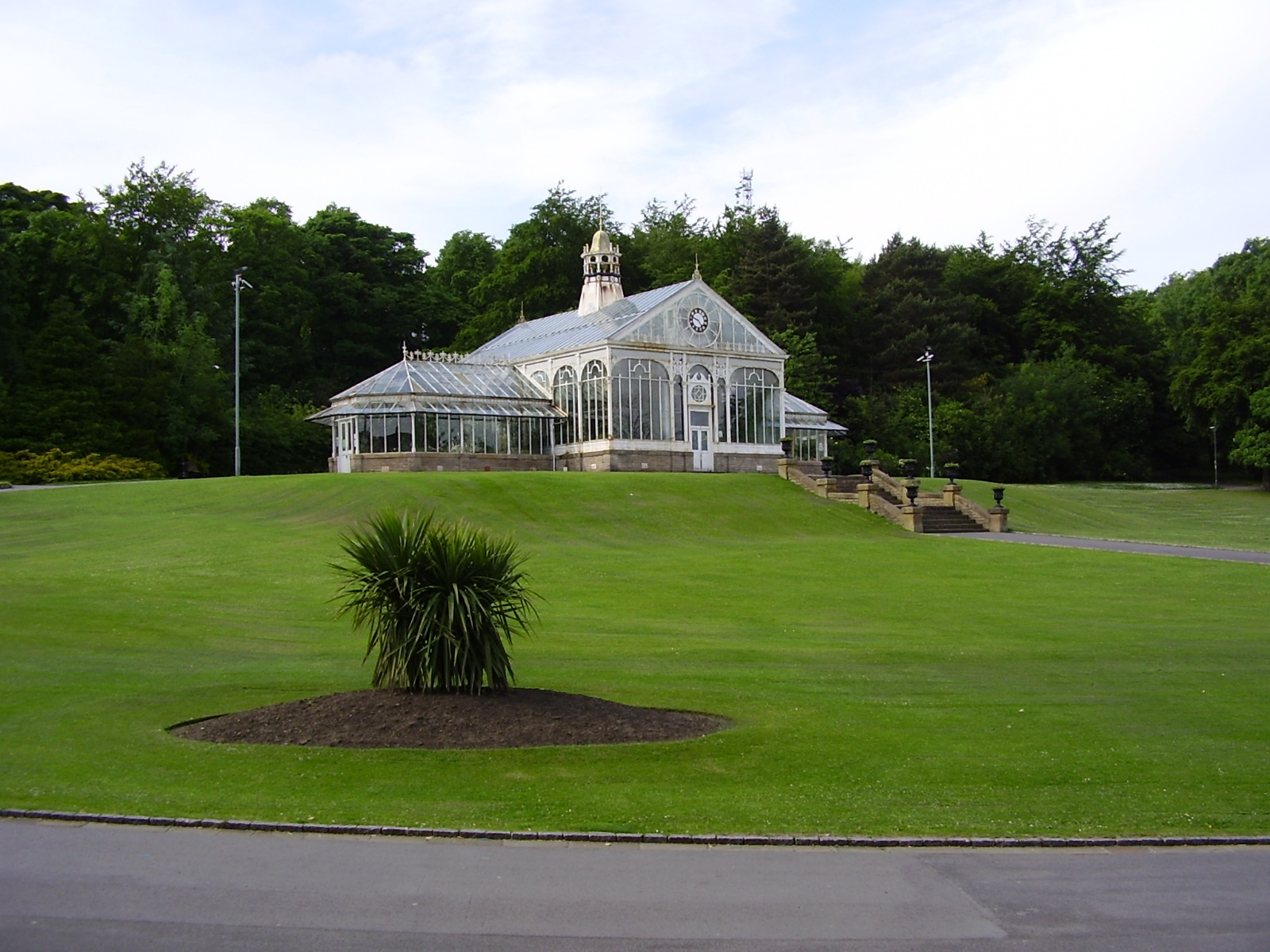
Corporation Park's conservatory, which dates from 1900

Corporation Park, north-west of the town centre, was built on 20 hectares (50 acres) of land bought from Joseph Feilden, lord of the manor, for £50 per acre (£120 per hectare) in 1855. It opened on 22 October 1857, with shops and mills closing for the day, church bells ringing and flags flying from public buildings. Railway companies claimed 14,000 people travelled to the opening. A conservatory was opened on 16 May 1900. Corporation Park contains the Blackburn War Memorial which commemorates those who lost their lives in the two World Wars. The town's annual Armistice parade concludes at the war memorial.

The town's Queen's Park was opened in June 1887, having been laid out at a cost of £10,000 on land acquired by Blackburn Corporation from the Ecclesiastical Commissioners in 1882. It originally had two bowling greens, two tennis courts, a lake of over 1.2 hectares (3 acres), a children's paddling pool, a bandstand and a refreshment room. Two additional bowling greens and a pavilion were added in 1932.

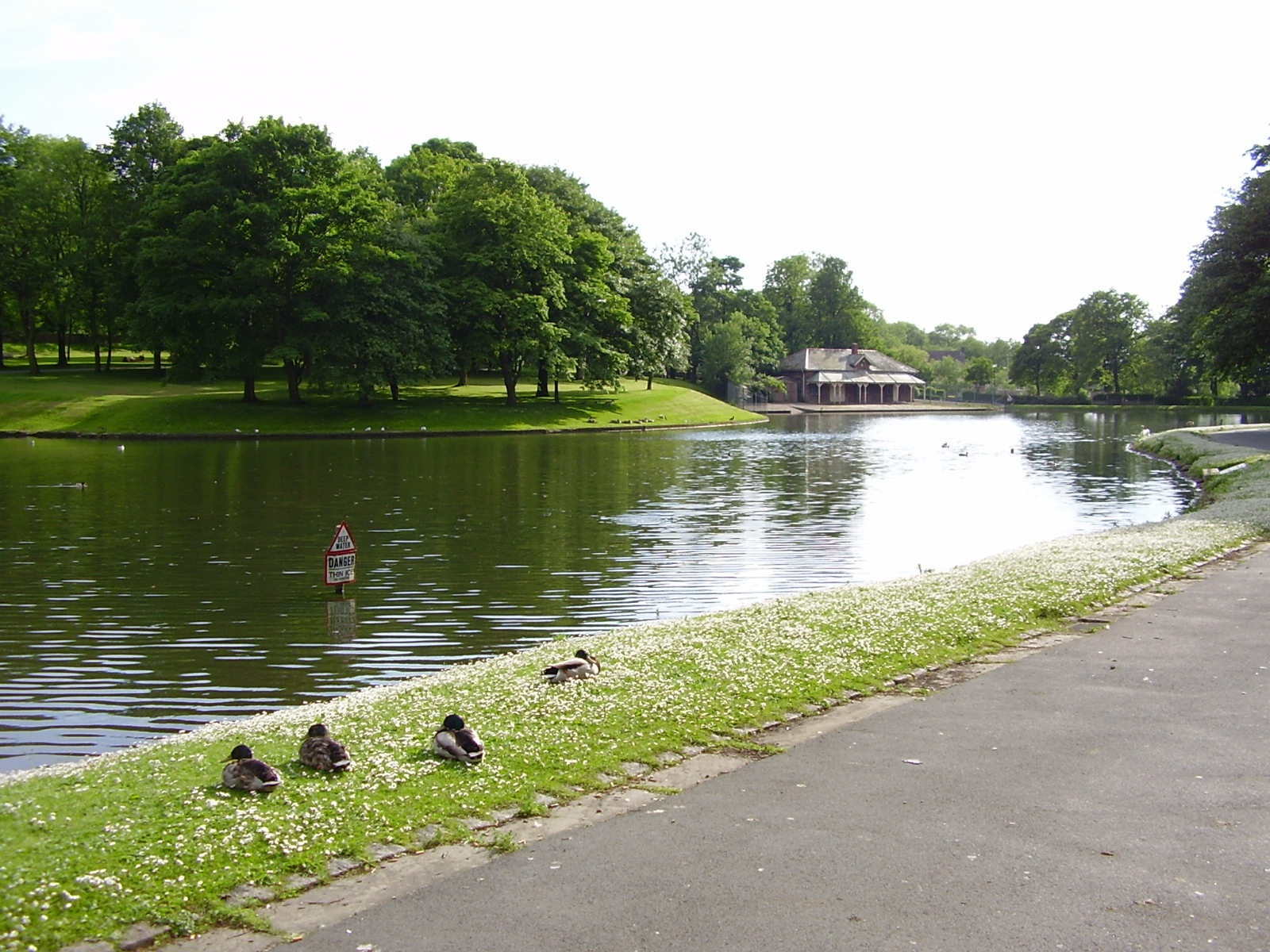
The main lake in Queen's Park

Witton Country Park is a 190-hectare (480-acre) space to the west of the town. The land was purchased in 1946 and was the ancestral home of the Feilden family. It is larger than all the town's other parks and playing fields put together. Witton Park High School is located within the park, as are three astroturf football pitches and a full-size athletic track, which is home to the Blackburn Harriers. The Blackburn model aircraft club also uses the park for radio-controlled aircraft. Pleasington Cemetery and crematorium lie on its edges.

Roe Lee Park, in the north of the town, was opened on 30 May 1923 to commemorate a visit by George V. It was originally a 6.5-hectare (16-acre) site with five tennis courts and three bowling greens. It was described as a 7-hectare (17-acre) "urban fringe park with bowling greens, kick around area and children's playground." In 2007, all four parks described here were winners of Green Flag awards.

Blackburn Cemetery is located to the north of the town centre, in Roe Lee.

=== Libraries ===
Blackburn Central Library, located in the town centre close to the Town Hall, is described as "the seventh most visited library in England". The library has an information and reference section, a media section, a community history section, a children's library and a creche; the ICT training suite has been named the Bill Gates Room. Blackburn has smaller libraries for the Mill Hill, Livesey and Roman Road parts of the town, and a mobile library service.

== Education ==
See List of schools in Blackburn with Darwen

Secondary education in Blackburn is provided by nine state-funded schools and one private school. In 2005, Tauheedul Islam Girls' High School became the first Muslim state school in the North West. It had previously been an independent school. Since then Tauheedul Islam Boys' High School has been established and Queen Elizabeth's Grammar School joined the state-funded sector.

The town also has a few special schools. St Thomas's and Sunnyhurst Pupil Referral Unit educates children unable to attend mainstream school for health reasons or other difficulties.

Over £25 million was invested in educational initiatives in Blackburn with Darwen in the late 2000s, including new schools, city learning centres and children's centres. Over 11,000 adults take part in some form of educational programme. Blackburn with Darwen council has twice had Beacon Status for education in the "Fostering School Improvement" and "Transforming the School Workforce" categories. Compared with 56.5% nationally, 51.3% of pupils in Blackburn with Darwen achieve grades A*–C. The average GCE/VCE A/AS and Equivalent Point Score per Student is 649.7, compared with 716.7 nationally.

Although the town's proportion of ethnic minorities is below 25%, in some schools the vast majority of pupils are from the ethnic minority population, whilst other schools are almost entirely white. This has been identified as a problem to racial integration in the town.

The independent school sector is represented by Westholme School and Jamiatul Ilm Wal Huda.

The two further education colleges in the town are Blackburn College and the sixth-form St. Mary's College. The town does not have a university, but some higher education courses for over-18s are provided by the East Lancashire Institute of Higher Education (ELIHE).

== Media ==
Local TV coverage is provided by BBC North West Tonight and ITV Granada Reports.

BBC Radio Lancashire is the main local radio station, along with Central Radio North West (which broadcasts from the town), Heart North West, Greatest Hits Radio Lancashire and Capital Manchester and Lancashire

The Lancashire Telegraph and Lancashire Post are the town's local newspapers.

== Sport ==
=== Football ===
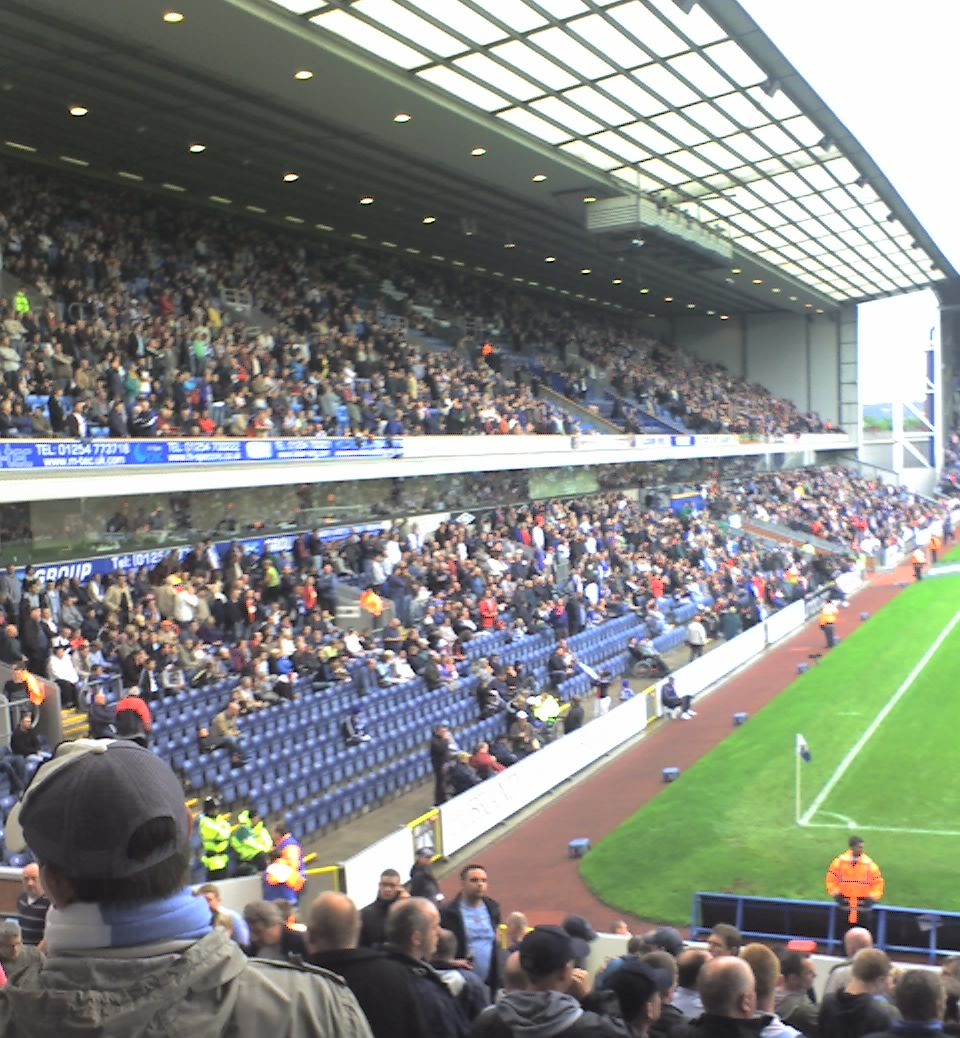
Ewood Park's Jack Walker Stand

EFL Championship side Blackburn Rovers is based at the Ewood Park stadium. It was established in 1875, becoming a founder member of The Football League in 1888. In 1890, Rovers moved to its current home ground. Until the formation of the FA Premier League in 1992, most of Rovers' success was pre-1930, when they won the league twice and FA Cup six times. After finishing runners-up to Manchester United in 1993–1994, Rovers won the Premier League in the following season. In 2002 they won the League Cup.

=== Ice hockey ===
Blackburn has an Olympic-sized ice rink housed at the 3,200-seat Blackburn Arena. The arena is the home of the Blackburn Hawks and Lancashire Raptors ice hockey teams, both of which play in the English National Ice Hockey League.

=== Cricket ===
Although Lancashire County Cricket Club plays inter-county cricket at Old Trafford Cricket Ground, the town club at Alexandra Meadows on Dukes Brow is the East Lancashire Cricket Club.

Blackburn Northern Cricket Club states it has recently leased the Ribchester Cricket Ground for its matches.

== In popular culture ==
Blackburn is mentioned in The Beatles' song "A Day in the Life," the closing track of their 1967 record Sgt. Pepper's Lonely Hearts Club Band.

I read the news today—oh, boy
4,000 holes in Blackburn, Lancashire
And though the holes were rather small
They had to count them all
Now they know how many holes it takes to fill the Albert Hall.

The title of the unofficial fanzine of Blackburn Rovers is 4,000 Holes, and the 1968 Beatles film Yellow Submarine has John Lennon, the band's rhythm guitarist and one half of its chief songwriting partnership with bassist Paul McCartney, mentioning the lyric as well in the "Sea of Holes".

The 2005 British film Love + Hate, directed by Dominic Savage, was shot in Blackburn.

== Notable people ==
=== Politics and industry ===
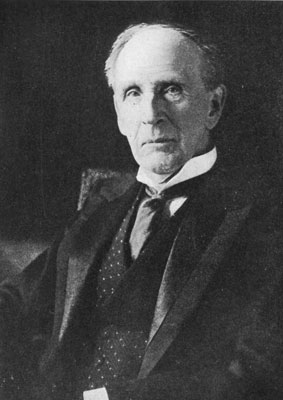
John Morley, British Liberal statesman, writer and newspaper editor, was born in Blackburn in 1838

- Jack Walker, steel baron and owner of the local steel company Walkersteel, was born in the town in 1929 and lived locally until he moved to the Channel Islands in 1974. He was a former owner of Blackburn Rovers.
- William Henry Hornby, a leading industrialist, the first mayor of Blackburn, and Chairman of the Conservative Party was born in the town in 1805.
- John Morley, 1st Viscount Morley of Blackburn, Liberal statesman, writer and newspaper editor was born in the town in 1838.
- Barbara Castle, an MP in Blackburn for 34 years (1945–1979) and holder of the positions of Secretary of State for Employment and Productivity, First Secretary of State and Secretary of State for Social Services under Labour governments of the 1960s and 1970s
- Sajjad Karim (born 1970) served as a Member of the European Parliament for the North West England between 2004 and 2019.
- George Dewhurst (1789-1857), Radical, Reformer and Reedmaker. "One of Blackburn's most remarkable sons".
- Louisa Entwistle was a suffragette from Blackburn, arrested in 1907.
- Mohsin Issa and Zuber Issa are owners of EG Group.

=== Arts and music ===
- Tony Ashton (1946–2001), rock musician
- Michael Billington (1941–2005), actor, star of UFO
- William Billington (1825–1884), writer, known as the "Blackburn Poet"
- Josephine Cox (1938–2020), fiction writer
- Ross Eccles (born 1937), contemporary artist; many of his paintings feature scenes and landmarks of Blackburn and Lancashire
- Kathleen Ferrier (1912–1953), contralto
- Christina Gabbitas (born 1967), author
- Clive Gardiner (1891-1960), artist, designer and illustrator
- Michael Gibson (born 1980), television presenter and documentary director
- Barry Gray (1908–1984), composer
- Kathleen Harrison (1892–1995), actress
- Tez Ilyas (born 1983), stand-up comedian
- Russell Harty (1934–1988), broadcaster
- Ethel Carnie Holdsworth (born Ethel Carnie; 1886–1962), writer and feminist
- Lee Mack, (born 1968), actor/comedian
- Grace Davies, (born 1997), singer/songwriter
- Sarah Martin (born 1974), musician, member of Belle and Sebastian
- Ian McShane (born 1942), actor
- Tony O'Neill, (born 1978), author
- Steve Pemberton (born 1967), actor
- Wendi Peters (born 1968), actress
- Ronald Stevenson (1928–2015), Scottish composer
- Jeanette Threlfall (1821–1880), Christian hymnist and poet
- Debbie Travis (born 1960), television host
- Anthony Valentine (1939–2015), actor
- Diana Vickers (born 1991), singer and actress
- Alfred Wainwright (1907–1991), guidebook author
- Jon Walmsley (born 1956), musician and actor
- Michael Winterbottom (born 1961), film maker
- William Wolstenholme (1865–1931), blind composer and organist
- William Woodruff (1916–2008), historian and author
- AJ Odudu (born 1988), television host.

=== Sport ===
- Gareth Ainsworth (born 1973), footballer and football manager
- Farakh Ajaib (born 1991), snooker player
- Iain Balshaw (born 1979), England rugby union player
- Nathon Burns (Born 1989) Judoka for Ireland
- John Byrom (born 1944), footballer
- Bernard Cafferty (born 1934), chess player, author and translator
- Albert Clough (1901–1957), professional footballer
- Matt Derbyshire (born 1986), footballer for Bradford City
- Anastasios Donis (born 1996), footballer for Stade Reims and Greece
- Keith Duckworth (1933–2005), motor-racing engine designer
- David Dunn (born 1979), footballer for Blackburn Rovers and England, then football coach
- Russell Edmonds (born 1977), former cricketer
- Frank Fielding (born 1988), footballer for Stoke City
- Carl Fogarty (born 1965), four time motorcycle World Superbike champion
- Joe Garner (born 1988), footballer for Carlisle United
- Will Greenwood (born 1972), England rugby union player
- Roy Isherwood (1934-2024), footballer for Blackburn Rovers
- Connor Mahoney (born 1997), footballer for Huddersfield Town
- William Marsden (1871-1944), footballer
- Oliver Newby (born 1984), cricketer for Lancashire
- Geoffrey Phillips (born 1931), England cricketer
- Anthony Pilkington (born 1988), footballer
- John Sumner (1936–2004), rock climber
- William Townley (1866–1950), footballer and coach
- Adam Wharton (born 2004), footballer for Blackburn Rovers, younger brother of Scott
- Scott Wharton (born 1997), footballer for Blackburn Rovers, elder brother of Adam.

=== Sciences ===
- Timothy Leighton (born 1963), ultrasonics and underwater acoustics professor, Institute of Sound and Vibration Research, University of Southampton
- Barbara Mawer (1936–2006), biochemist and medical researcher
- Noel Slater (1912–1973), mathematician and astronomer
- Eric Fawcett (1927–2000), professor in the Department of Physics at the University of Toronto, credited with discovering the Hall effect in type-II superconductors

=== Other ===
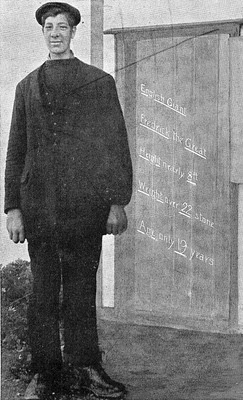
Frederick Kempster, British giant and showman, known for his extreme height

Born in Blackburn, Frederick Kempster was dubbed "The English Giant" at a height of 7 feet 9 inches (2.36 m). He lived from 1889–1918 and remains one of England's tallest people by the Guinness Book of Records.

== Twin towns ==
Blackburn is twinned with

- Altena, Germany
- Péronne, Somme, France
- Tarnów, Poland.

== See also ==
- Listed buildings in Blackburn
