= Louisa Entwistle =

English suffragette (born 1887)

Louisa Entwistle (born 1887) was an English suffragette.

== Biography ==
Entwistle was born in 1887 in Blackburn, Lancashire, England. She worked as a factory hand in a mill.

When she was 20, Entwistle travelled to London to a demonstration outside Parliament which was organised by the Women’s Social and Political Union (WSPU). She was among a group of sixty protestors for women's suffrage who raided the House of Commons and were arrested. Entwistle was tried on 14 February 1907 at Westminster Police Court in London. The Lancashire Evening Post reported that during her trial Entwistle said to the magistrate that she was:

"here to get votes for women. I am here on behalf of my companions who work in the mill and until we get votes we shall not be satisfied. We don’t want to make a name for ourselves, and it is for women who work in the mills, and who have their homes and their children to look after, that single women are trying to get the vote. It is for these helpless women that we are fighting. Our opponents know that if we get the vote we shall alter a lot of things, and they are frightened."

Entwistle was imprisoned for a week in HM Holloway Prison. After returning home, she was interviewed about her actions by the Blackburn Weekly Telegraph.

In 2018, an artwork was created featuring Entwistle on hoardings opposite Blackburn Museum and Art Gallery for International Women's Day. In 2020, a street on a housing estate in Blackburn was named in Entwistle's honour.
