= William Marston =

William Marston may refer to:

- William Moulton Marston (1893–1947), American psychologist, inventor and comic book writer who created the character Wonder Woman
- William H. Marston (1835–1926), early resident of Berkeley, California

== See also ==
- William Marsden (disambiguation)
