= Albert Clough =

English footballer

Personal information
- Full name: Albert Edward Clough
- Date of birth: 1901
- Place of birth: Blackburn, England
- Date of death: 1 January 1957 (aged 56)
- Place of death: Blackburn, England
- Height: 5 ft 11 in (1.80 m)
- Position: Left back

Senior career*
Years	Team	Apps	(Gls)
	Great Harwood	?	(?)
1919	Blackburn Rovers	1	(0)
1921	Blackpool	1	(0)
	Great Harwood	?	(?)
- * Club domestic league appearances and goals

Albert Edward Clough (1901 – 1 January 1957) was an English professional footballer. A left back, he played one game each in the Football League for Blackburn Rovers and Blackpool.
