= Roy Isherwood =

English footballer

Personal information
- Full name: Roy Edward Isherwood
- Date of birth: 24 January 1934
- Place of birth: Blackburn, England
- Date of death: February 2024 (aged 90)
- Position: Right winger

Senior career*
| Years | Team | Apps | (Gls) |
- Nelson
| 1956–1962 | Blackburn Rovers | 49 | (9) |
| 1962–1963 | Chelmsford City | 26 | (9) |
| 1963–1964 | Altrincham | | |
- * Club domestic league appearances and goals

Roy Edward Isherwood (24 January 1934 — February 2024) was an English footballer who played as a right winger.

== Career ==
Isherwood signed for Blackburn Rovers in 1956 from non-league club Nelson. Blackburn gained promotion from the Second Division in Isherwood's first season at the club. Isherwood would go on to make 49 league appearances, scoring nine times, during his time at Blackburn. In 1962, Isherwood signed for Chelmsford City for £5,000 as part of a bid to gain election into the Football League. In 1963, Isherwood signed for Altrincham.
