= Geoffrey Phillips =

English cricketer

Personal information
- Full name: Alan Geoffrey Phillips
- Born: 27 March 1931; Blackburn, Lancashire, England
- Died: 2023 (aged 92); Kempsey, Worcestershire
- Batting: Right-handed
- Bowling: Leg break

Domestic team information
- Years: Team
- 1953–1954: Oxford University
- 1960: Shropshire

Career statistics
Competition	First-class
Matches	3
Runs scored	71
Batting average	14.20
100s/50s	–/–
Top score	31
Catches/stumpings	1/–
- Source: Cricinfo, 10 July 2019

Alan Geoffrey Phillips (27 March 1931 – 2023) was an English first-class cricketer.

Phillips was born at Blackburn in March 1931. While studying at Worcester College at the University of Oxford, he made three appearances in first-class cricket for Oxford University against Worcestershire in 1931, followed by matches against Middlesex and Worcestershire in 1954. He scored 71 runs in these three matches, with a high score of 31. In addition to playing first-class cricket, Phillips also played minor counties cricket for Shropshire in 1960, making a single appearance in the Minor Counties Championship.

Outside of cricket, Phillips had a career as a teacher which included a spell as housemaster at Shrewsbury School. He died in 2023 at the age of 92.
