= Guide, Lancashire =

Coordinates: 53.725°N 2.442°W

Guide
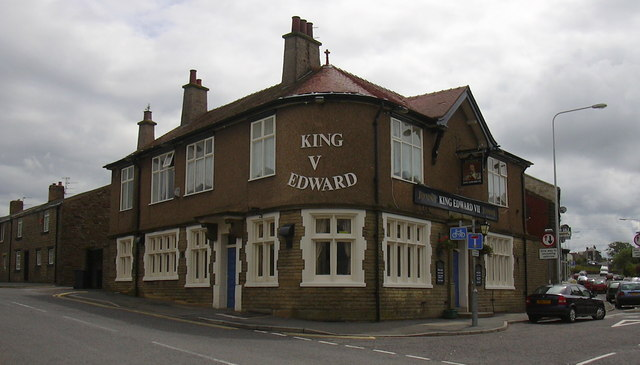
- The King Edward VII public house, Guide

- Shown within Blackburn with Darwen Location within Lancashire
- OS grid reference: SD708255
- Unitary authority: Blackburn with Darwen
- Ceremonial county: Lancashire
- Region: North West
- Country: England
- Sovereign state: United Kingdom
- Post town: BLACKBURN
- Postcode district: BB1
- Dialling code: 01254
- Police: Lancashire
- Fire: Lancashire
- Ambulance: North West
- UK Parliament: Blackburn

Guide is a village on the edge of Blackburn, in Lancashire, England. It is located south of the town centre, and the M65 Motorway passes around the south and east of the village, with Junction 5 situated immediately to the southwest of the village.

People who are born and have lived in Guide all of their lives are known as "Guiders". The traditional village pub, The King Edward, is on the corner of the original crossroads. The village also includes a post office, a Micro Brewery called The Patrons Tap, and a working men's club. A recreation ground features stone benches and flowers.

There are a number of industrial and office buildings in the area, many of which have been built since the motorway was extended in late 1990s. Residents have protested against the increasing industrial development of the area.

The Guide reservoir is surrounded by countryside. The area has a nearby pub, The Willows, and a DW Sports soccerdome and gym.

The main roads in the village were originally Haslingden Road (the former B6232), Blackamoor Road and School Lane (both B6231). As part of the extension work of the M65, which was completed in 1997, one section of Haslingden Road including the crossroads was bypassed and the road became part of the A6077, which connects the town centre of Blackburn to the motorway.
