= William Marsden (footballer, born 1871) =

English footballer

Personal information
- Full name: William Fish Marsden
- Date of birth: 20 June 1871
- Place of birth: Blackburn, England
- Date of death: 1943 (aged 71–72)
- Position: Forward

Senior career*
Years	Team	Apps	(Gls)
1891–1892	Darwen	19	(7)
- * Club domestic league appearances and goals

William Fish Marsden (20 June 1871 – 1943) was an English footballer who played in the Football League for Darwen. Marsden scored a consolation goal for Darwen in the 3-1 1891 Lancashire Cup Final defeat against Blackpool at Anfield.
