= Bill Taylor (English politician) =

Sir Bill Taylor (born 1952) is the former leader of Blackburn with Darwen Council in England and election agent for Blackburn MP and former Justice Minister Jack Straw from 1979 to 2010. He was Mayor of the Borough of Blackburn from 1989–90 and was knighted in 2003 for services to local government. From its creation in the late 1990s, Blackburn with Darwen was Council of the Year twice. He was approached to assume the role of Chair of 3rd Sector Lancashire to coordinate Lancashire's 4,500+ voluntary groups. From 2009 till 2013 he chaired the Blackburn with Darwen ground breaking NHS Care Trust Plus.

== Education and professional life ==
Taylor graduated in Politics, Education and Trade Union Studies at Lancaster University in 1973, and in 1976 achieved an Advanced Certificate of Education at Manchester Polytechnic. He returned to Lancaster University to gain an MA in Education in 1985.

He worked in youth and community work as a detached worker, centre-based, area-focused and a school-based youth tutor. He was a youth and community work trainer and manager in multi-ethnic Blackburn for 22 years and neighbouring more rural Ribble Valley for 11 until he retired in early 2006.

== Politics ==
Within Blackburn's local government he chaired various committees. His leadership qualities were frequently highlighted as crucial factors in service development and delivery.

== Consultancy work ==
After retiring Taylor established a consultancy and worked with the now merged Local Government Association and the Improvement and Development Agency. He has also worked with Community Business Partners, Enterprise for All, RCU, & Capita. Having first sat on the Board of Blackburn College in 1981, he became the Chair in 2008 & supervised the multimillion-pound transformational buildings programme of the new HE University Centre, FE Beacon Centre, Admin Harrison Centre. The new STEM building & motor technology building are on schedule too. He is involved in the Trust movement & the Action Group as a Patron relating to the Rao family takeover as owners of Blackburn Rovers FC & has chaired the collaboration meetings of all such groups.
