= Michael Gibson (TV presenter) =

- Nationality: British
- Website: www.me-tv.co

Michael Gibson is a TV presenter and documentary director. He presented the MTV Select television program which aired weekday afternoons on MTV across Europe.

== Career ==
After spending some time working as a runner at Talkback Thames, Gibson was hired by MTV to work as a presenter and began presenting MTV Select in the UK and Europe in 2006. He then went on to work as a researcher at Betty TV, working on Freaky Eaters. He worked as a freelance editor, working with corporate clients like Belvedere Vodka and Nokia. He left London and started teaching media for a few years, then setting up a business renting out a video guestbook for special events in 2011. He now works at the BBC and just finished on series 12 of Dragons' Den.

== Personal life ==
Gibson was diagnosed with Parkinson's disease at the age of 18. It is rare for someone to be diagnosed with Parkinson's at such a young age. Gibson lived in denial about his condition for six years. He then pitched a documentary proposal to Channel 4, who commissioned him to make a documentary following Michael's journey with Parkinson's. All shook up: Parkinson's at 25 aired on Channel 4 in 2006.

== Sources ==
- Thisislondon.co.uk
- MTV.co.uk
- BBC.co.uk
- Channel4.com
- Parkinsons.org
- BBC.co.uk
- MMU.ac.uk
