= Comprehensive Performance Assessment =

In the United Kingdom, the Comprehensive Performance Assessment (CPA), conducted by the Audit Commission, assessed the performance of every local authority and the services that they provide for local people.

The Audit Commission first introduced CPA in 2002. It evolved in response to changes in the operational and regulatory environment, rising public expectations, and local government performance.

CPA measured how well councils delivered services for local people and communities. It looked at performance from a range of perspectives and combined a set of judgements to provide both a simply understood rating and a more complete picture of where to focus activity to secure improvement.

The Comprehensive Area Assessment replaced CPA in April 2009.

Note: CPA should not be confused with the Comprehensive Annual Financial Reports, or CAFR a practice started after World War II in the United States (replacing "off the books" practices such as "general fixed asset account group"); A CAFR is one of several standard Government financial reports.
