= Blackburn College, Lancashire =

Coordinates: 53.748°N 2.488°W

Blackburn College
- Blackburn, Lancashire; England

Information
- Established: 1888
- Department for Education URN: 130736 Tables
- Ofsted: Reports
- Principal: Dr Fazal Dad
- Enrollment: 5,000 students
- Website: http://www.blackburn.ac.uk

Blackburn College is a further and higher education college in Blackburn, North West England.

== History ==
Blackburn College started as Blackburn Technical College, which was established in 1888 by public subscription. The foundation stone was officially laid by the Prince (later Edward VII) and Princess of Wales. It originally specialised in engineering and textiles, later introducing tertiary courses, such as A–levels in 1984.

== Locations ==
The main campus is located close to Blackburn Town Centre, and consists of several buildings.

== Development ==
In the 2000s, four phases of construction were announced, as the college aimed to modernise its campus, and increase the range of degrees offered.

The first was St Paul's Centre, with IT and sixth form facilities, which was completed in 2007 at a cost of £8.8 million, and was opened in September 2007 by the Archbishop of York John Sentamu. Construction of this building began in July 2006. Phase 2, the University Centre, was completed in 2009, costing £14 million, and was opened in September 2009, by Labour MP Jack Straw and then Blackburn Rovers manager Sam Allardyce.

Phase 3 of the re development is the largest building in the entire programme, the £18.3 million Beacon Centre, opposite the Construction Centre on St. Paul's Street, which was completed in the end of 2011, and was opened in February 2012, by chair of governors Sir Bill Taylor and The X Factor finalist Amelia Lily. It includes teaching spaces, for art and photography studios and IT suites, as well as a male and female multi faith prayer room.

In July 2012, demolition of the 1960s Feilden Street building, which housed the colleges Sixth Form until the St Paul's Centre in 2007, began (with a little help from Vice Chair and ex Borough Council Chief Executive Phil Watson and Mark Felix), making room for Phase 4, as well as Phase 5. In September 2013, Phase 4 of the re development, the STEM(MM) (Science, Technology, Engineering and Maths (Media and Music)) building opened, the Sir Bill Taylor Futures Centre, named after the long serving governor and chair, and is placed next to the University Centre.

In September 2014, the college's new Regional Automotive Hub opened, and was officially opened in August 2014 by Phil Watson accompanied by Carl Fogarty, and has had developed input by representatives from both Nissan and Škoda. The Regional Automotive Hub is Phase 5 of the colleges re development, and possibly one of the last buildings to be built, along with a new leisure centre, which was opened in March 2015 by College Chair Sir Bill Taylor and Council Leader Cllr Kate Hollern with guest Rebecca Adlington. Construction began in November 2013, and was completed in August 2014. It was originally set to open in September 2014, a month after the opening of the Regional Automotive Hub.

It is called Blackburn Sports & Leisure Centre, and includes a six lane pool, learner pool, two sports halls, gym, aerobics studio, wet/dry changing facilities, as well as a new coach drop off point. It replaces the 1980s Waves Water Fun Centre, opened by Council Recreation Chair Cllr Bill Taylor, which closed in February 2015, and was demolished during March 2016.

== Reports ==
In January 2008, the college was rated as outstanding in an Ofsted report, which took place in November 2007. In September 2008, it was one of five colleges in the North West to be awarded Beacon status by the Quality Improvement Agency.

The college currently has a status of Good with Ofsted after being inspected in January 2022.

== Notable alumni ==
- Adnan Hussain (born 1989), Member of Parliament for Blackburn.

== See also ==
- Sir Robert Howson Pickard FRS, head of chemistry and principal 1900 to 1920, later Vice-Chancellor of the University of London from 1937 to 1939.
- List of UCAS institutions
- List of universities in the United Kingdom
