= John Sumner (climber) =

British rock climber

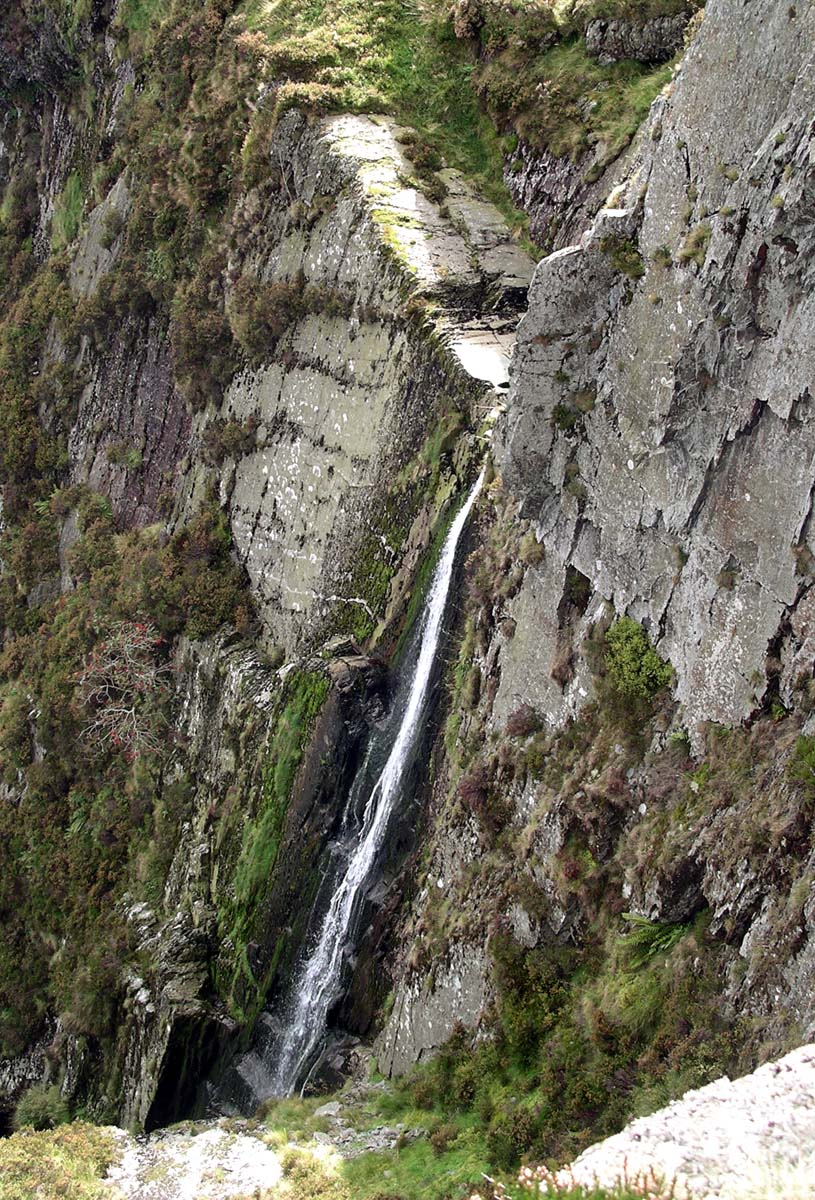
Sumner dominated climbing in Mid Wales, including routes on the waterfalls of Maesglase.

John (Fritz) Sumner (17 March 1935, in Didsbury – 2004) was the pre-eminent exploratory climber in his chosen domain of Mid Wales, climbing cutting-edge routes on the remote crags and cliff-faces south of southern Snowdonia starting in the mid-1950s.

== Books ==
- John A Sumner (1973). Central Wales. West Col. p.153. SBN 901516 69 4.
- John A Sumner (1975). Dolgellau Area. West Col. p.139. SBN 901516 99 6.
- J. A. Sumner (1980). Aran Cader Idris Climbers' Guide Supplement. West Col. p. 64. SBN 906227 09 7
- John Sumner (1988). Mid-Wales. Climbers Club. p. 231. ISBN 0-901601-42-X.
- Martin Crocker, John Sumner, et al. (2002). Meirionnydd. Climbers Club. p. 512 ISBN 0-901601-63-2
