= Blackburn with Darwen Borough Council elections =

Local government elections in Lancashire, England

Blackburn with Darwen Borough Council elections are held three years out of every four, with a third of the council being elected each time. Blackburn with Darwen Borough Council is the local authority for the unitary authority of Blackburn with Darwen in Lancashire, England. Since the last boundary changes in 2018, 51 councillors have been elected from 17 wards.

== Council elections ==
- 1973 Blackburn Borough Council election
- 1976 Blackburn Borough Council election
- 1979 Blackburn Borough Council election (New ward boundaries)
- 1980 Blackburn Borough Council election
- 1982 Blackburn Borough Council election
- 1983 Blackburn Borough Council election
- 1984 Blackburn Borough Council election
- 1986 Blackburn Borough Council election
- 1987 Blackburn Borough Council election
- 1988 Blackburn Borough Council election
- 1990 Blackburn Borough Council election
- 1991 Blackburn Borough Council election
- 1992 Blackburn Borough Council election
- 1994 Blackburn Borough Council election (Borough boundary changes took place but the number of seats remained the same)
- 1995 Blackburn Borough Council election
- 1996 Blackburn Borough Council election
- 1997 Blackburn with Darwen Borough Council election (New ward boundaries)
- 1999 Blackburn with Darwen Borough Council election
- 2000 Blackburn with Darwen Borough Council election
- 2002 Blackburn with Darwen Borough Council election
- 2003 Blackburn with Darwen Borough Council election
- 2004 Blackburn with Darwen Borough Council election (New ward boundaries increased the number of seats by 2)
- 2006 Blackburn with Darwen Borough Council election
- 2007 Blackburn with Darwen Borough Council election
- 2008 Blackburn with Darwen Borough Council election
- 2010 Blackburn with Darwen Borough Council election
- 2011 Blackburn with Darwen Borough Council election
- 2012 Blackburn with Darwen Borough Council election
- 2014 Blackburn with Darwen Borough Council election
- 2015 Blackburn with Darwen Borough Council election
- 2016 Blackburn with Darwen Borough Council election
- 2018 Blackburn with Darwen Borough Council election (New ward boundaries)
- 2019 Blackburn with Darwen Borough Council election
- 2021 Blackburn with Darwen Borough Council election
- 2022 Blackburn with Darwen Borough Council election
- 2023 Blackburn with Darwen Borough Council election
- 2024 Blackburn with Darwen Borough Council election
- 2026 Blackburn with Darwen Borough Council election

== Results maps ==
2004 results map

2006 results map

2007 results map

2008 results map

2010 results map

2011 results map

2012 results map

2014 results map

2015 results map

2016 results map

2018 results map

2019 results map

2021 results map

2022 results map

2023 results map

2024 results map

2026 results map

== By-election results ==
=== 2002-2006 ===
Mill Hill By-Election 21 November 2002
Party	Candidate	Votes	%	±%
BNP	Robin Evans	578	32.1	+32.1
Labour	Gail Barton	562	31.2	−16.3
Liberal Democrats	David D'Arcy	505	28.1	−24.4
Conservative	Karl Turner	154	8.6	+8.6
Majority		16	0.9	
Turnout		1,799	39.4	
BNP gain from Liberal Democrats		Swing		

Earcroft By-Election 15 July 2004 (2)
Party	Candidate	Votes	%	±%
Labour	Moira Barrett	492	20.4%	
Labour	Francis Davis	443	18.3%	
Liberal Democrats	John East	300	12.4%	
Liberal Democrats	Anthony Melia	277	11.4%	
Conservative	Julie Slater	212	8.7%	
Conservative	Konrad Tapp	201	8.3%	
BNP	Nicholas Holt	133	5.5%	
Independent	Sam Stone	114	4.7%	
Independent	Trevor Maxfield	109	4.5%	
BNP	Anthony Dailly	106	4.3%	
British National Socialist Party	Robin Evans	14	0.5%	
British National Socialist Party	Natalia Finn	10	0.4%	
Turnout		2,411	37.9	
Labour hold		Swing		
Labour gain from Conservative		Swing		

=== 2006-2010 ===
East Rural By-Election 28 September 2006
Party	Candidate	Votes	%	±%
Independent	Julie Slater	209	28.1	+28.1
Conservative	John Raseta	201	27.0	−66.7
England First	Stephen Hart	99	13.3	+13.3
Liberal Democrats	Brian Dunning	91	12.2	+12.2
Labour	Stella McLennan	75	10.1	+3.8
BNP	Nicholas Holt	70	9.4	+9.4
Majority		8	1.1	
Turnout		745	46.2	
Independent gain from Conservative		Swing		

Queens Park By-Election 4 February 2010
Party	Candidate	Votes	%	±%
Labour	Mustafa Desai	638	54.2	+3.0
Liberal Democrats	Imtiaz Patel	366	31.1	−17.8
Conservative	Asghar Ali	174	14.8	+14.8
Majority		272	23.1	
Turnout		1,178	28.4	
Labour gain from Liberal Democrats		Swing		

=== 2010-2014 ===
Beardwood with Lammack By-Election 28 July 2011
Party	Candidate	Votes	%	±%
Conservative	Julie Daley	1,097	63.8	+3.4
Labour	Ashley Whalley	572	33.3	+0.1
Liberal Democrats	Salim Lorgat	51	3.0	−3.4
Majority		525	30.5	
Turnout		1,720		
Conservative hold		Swing		

=== 2014-2018 ===
Mill Hill By-Election 23 July 2015
Party	Candidate	Votes	%	±%
Labour	Carl Nuttall	505	58.8	+9.0
UKIP	Michael Longbottom	179	20.8	−7.6
Conservative	Helen Tolley	106	12.3	−4.9
Liberal Democrats	Alan Dean	69	8.0	+3.4
Majority		326	38.0	
Turnout		859		
Labour hold		Swing		

Higher Croft By-Election 15 December 2016
Party	Candidate	Votes	%	±%
Labour	Amy Johnson	435	58.2	−15.7
UKIP	Ian Grimshaw	187	25.0	+25.0
Conservative	Maureen McGarvey	125	16.7	−9.4
Majority		248	33.2	
Turnout		747		
Labour hold		Swing		

Higher Croft By-Election 23 March 2017
Party	Candidate	Votes	%	±%
Labour	Adam Holden	446	59.6	−14.3
UKIP	Ian Grimshaw	169	22.6	+22.6
Conservative	Maureen McGarvey	133	17.8	−8.3
Majority		277	37.0	
Turnout		748		
Labour hold		Swing		

Marsh House By-Election 4 May 2017
Party	Candidate	Votes	%	±%
Conservative	Lynn Perkins	748	41.5	+7.7
Liberal Democrats	Paul Browne	580	32.2	+15.3
Labour	Kieran Richards	474	26.3	−7.4
Majority		168	9.3	
Turnout		1,802		
Conservative gain from Labour		Swing		

Higher Croft By-Election 8 June 2017
Party	Candidate	Votes	%	±%
Labour	Matt Gibson	1,579	57.6	−16.3
Conservative	Ann Tolley	818	29.9	+3.8
UKIP	Ian Grimshaw	343	12.5	+12.5
Majority		761	27.8	
Turnout		2,740		
Labour hold		Swing		

=== 2022-2026 ===
Darwen South By-Election 17 November 2022
Party	Candidate	Votes	%	±%
Labour	Matt Jackson	569	44.9	+6.6
Conservative	Janine Crook	562	44.3	−1.8
Liberal Democrats	Mark Peter Davies	137	10.8	−4.9
Majority		7	0.6	
Turnout		1,271	19.9	
Labour gain from Conservative		Swing		
