= 2024 Blackburn with Darwen Borough Council election =

Local election in Blackburn with Darwen, England

- 2 May 2024

17 out of 51 seats to Blackburn with Darwen Borough Council 26 seats needed for a majority

	First party	Second party	Third party
Leader	Phil Riley		John Slater
Party	Labour	Independent	Conservative
Seats before	31	9	11
Seats won	7	8	2
Seats after	29	13	9
Seat change	▼2	▲4	▼2
Popular vote	12,749	10,964	7,094
Percentage	40.4%	34.7%	22.5%
Swing	▼22.6%	▲34.2%	▼7.8%
- Winner of each seat at the 2024 Blackburn with Darwen Borough Council election
Leader before election
Phil Riley
Labour
Leader after election
Phil Riley
Labour

The 2024 Blackburn with Darwen Borough Council election took place on Thursday 2 May 2024, alongside the other local elections in the United Kingdom being held on the same day, to elect one-third of the 51 members of Blackburn with Darwen Borough Council in Lancashire.

Labour retained control of the council. Both Labour and the Conservatives lost seats to independent candidates, many of whom were allied to the '4 BwD' group of independents which had formed on the council in autumn 2023. After the election there were 12 councillors in the 4BwD group, overtaking the Conservatives who were left with 9 seats. The 4 BwD group therefore became the council's official opposition.

== Background ==
The Labour Party have governed Blackburn with Darwen for most of its history. They controlled the council from its creation in 1997 as a unitary authority to 2007, and again from 2011 to the present, with a period of no overall control between. In the previous election, Labour won 14 seats (up 2) with 63.0% of the vote, the Conservatives won 3 (down 1) with 30.3%, and the Liberal Democrats lost the seat they were defending with 5.1%.

The seats up for election in 2024 were last contested in 2021; because of the delay of all local elections due to the COVID-19 pandemic, the seats are up for election after 3 years rather than the usual 4. In that election, Labour won 11 seats with 55.4%, the Conservatives won 6 with 38.8%, and the Liberal Democrats won 0 with 5.0%.

== Previous council composition ==
After 2023 election		Before 2024 election		After 2024 election	
Party	Seats	Party	Seats	Party	Seats
Labour	39	Labour	31	Labour	29
Conservative	12	Conservative	11	Conservative	9
Independent	0	Independent	9	Independent	13

Changes:

- October 2023: Saj Ali, Mustafa Desai, Samim Desai, Suleman Khonat, Abdul Patel, Salma Patel, and Salim Sidat leave Labour to sit as independents; (Note: Sit as part of the 4 BwD group on the council, which is not registered as a political party.) Mohammed Irfan suspended from Labour; Altaf "Tiger" Patel leaves Conservatives to sit as an independent

== Results summary ==
2024 Blackburn with Darwen Borough Council election
Party	This election			Full council			This election		
Party	Seats	Net	Seats %	Other	Total	Total %	Votes	Votes %	+/−
Labour	7	▼2	41.2	22	29	56.9	12,749	40.4	-22.6
Independent	8	▲4	47.1	5	13	25.5	10,964	34.7	+34.2
Conservative	2	▼2	11.8	7	9	17.6	7,094	22.5	-7.8
Green	0	Steady	0.0	0	0	0.0	762	2.4	+1.5

== Ward results ==
=== Audley & Queen's Park ===
Audley & Queen's Park
Party	Candidate	Votes	%	±%
Independent	Amin Kapadia	1,068	49.2	N/A
Labour	Faryad Hussain	664	30.6	–36.5
Green	Aadil Chopdat	311	14.3	N/A
Conservative	Lyall Ainscow	129	5.9	−12.5
Turnout		2,202	34.2	+5.8
Independent hold				

=== Bastwell & Daisyfield ===
Bastwell & Daisyfield
Party	Candidate	Votes	%	±%
Independent	Rana Khan	1,273	52.6	N/A
Labour	Iftakhar Hussain*	936	38.7	–41.7
Conservative	Ella Hardman	139	5.7	−13.9
Independent	Khurram Shahzad	71	2.9	N/A
Turnout		2,442	41.3	+6.1
Independent gain from Labour				

=== Billinge & Beardwood ===
Billinge & Beardwood
Party	Candidate	Votes	%	±%
Independent	Waqar Hussain	1,512	62.7	N/A
Labour	Aadil Patel	509	21.1	–40.9
Conservative	Reece Macaulay	389	16.1	−16.6
Turnout		2,423	38.3	+4.1
Independent hold				

=== Blackburn Central ===
Blackburn Central
Party	Candidate	Votes	%	±%
Independent	Tahir Mahmood	799	51.2	N/A
Labour	Liyakatali Patel	596	38.2	–38.2
Conservative	Keith Murray	166	10.6	−5.5
Turnout		1,561	25.0	
Independent hold				

=== Blackburn South & Lower Darwen ===
Blackburn South & Lower Darwen
Party	Candidate	Votes	%	±%
Labour	Liz Johnson	809	53.8	+9.8
Conservative	Denise Gee*	696	46.2	−9.8
Turnout		1,531	26.7	+0.4
Labour gain from Conservative		Swing	▲9.8	

=== Blackburn South East ===
Blackburn South East
Party	Candidate	Votes	%	±%
Labour	Tony Humphrys*	628	58.3	−15.1
Independent	Riff Haworth	259	24.0	N/A
Conservative	Henry Arnold	191	17.7	−8.9
Turnout		1,093	17.8	+1.1
Labour hold				

=== Darwen East ===
Darwen East
Party	Candidate	Votes	%	±%
Labour	Katrina Fielding*	773	58.6	−0.5
Independent	Paul Browne	331	25.1	N/A
Conservative	Ryan Slater	214	16.2	+0.4
Turnout		1,335	20.7	–1.2
Labour hold				

=== Darwen South ===
Darwen South
Party	Candidate	Votes	%	±%
Labour	Matt Jackson*	903	49.0	+3.7
Conservative	Steve Duncan	734	39.8	−1.0
Green	Denise Morgan	206	11.2	N/A
Turnout		1,868	28.5	–0.3
Labour hold		Swing	▲2.4	

=== Darwen West ===
Darwen West
Party	Candidate	Votes	%	±%
Labour	Brian Taylor*	1,293	73.7	+10.9
Conservative	Lilian Salton	460	26.2	−5.1
Turnout		1,775	28.7	–2.1
Labour hold		Swing	▲8.0	

=== Ewood ===
Ewood
Party	Candidate	Votes	%	±%
Labour	Ashley Whalley	657	52.8	−5.4
Conservative	Rick Moore	397	31.9	−9.9
Green	John Milburn	128	10.3	N/A
Independent	Saraj Mohammed	63	5.1	N/A
Turnout		1,256	20.3	–0.5
Labour gain from Conservative		Swing	▲2.3	

=== Little Harwood & Whitebirk ===
Little Harwood & Whitebirk
Party	Candidate	Votes	%	±%
Independent	Tiger Patel	809	36.5	N/A
Independent	Ismail Esat	755	34.1	N/A
Labour	Naushad Surve	480	21.7	–58.6
Conservative	Les Cade	170	7.7	−5.6
Turnout		2,247	36.7	+11.4
Independent hold				

=== Livesey with Pleasington ===
Livesey with Pleasington
Party	Candidate	Votes	%	±%
Conservative	Mark Russell*	1,441	74.7	+7.2
Labour	Isma Sajid	487	25.3	−7.2
Turnout		1,955	29.6	–1.9
Conservative hold		Swing	▲7.2	

=== Mill Hill & Moorgate ===
Mill Hill & Moorgate
Party	Candidate	Votes	%	±%
Labour	Julie Gunn*	697	64.0	−4.1
Conservative	John Murphy	272	25.0	+2.0
Independent	Natasha Shah	120	11.0	N/A
Turnout		1,127	19.8	–0.4
Labour hold		Swing	▼3.1	

=== Roe Lee ===
Roe Lee
Party	Candidate	Votes	%	±%
Independent	Imran Ahmed	999	46.9	N/A
Labour	Sylvia Liddle*	723	34.0	–33.4
Conservative	Helen Voegt	406	19.1	−4.7
Turnout		2,151	33.1	+5.3
Independent gain from Labour				

=== Shear Brow & Corporation Park ===
Shear Brow & Corporation Park
Party	Candidate	Votes	%	±%
Independent	Muntazir Patel	1,957	70.9	N/A
Labour	Hussain Akhtar*	740	26.8	–63.7
Conservative	Judith Pearson	65	2.4	−7.1
Turnout		2,787	45.0	+17.1
Independent gain from Labour				

=== Wensley Fold ===
Wensley Fold
Party	Candidate	Votes	%	±%
Independent	Iqbal Masters	948	46.7	N/A
Labour	Dave Harling*	881	43.4	−46.7
Green	Robin Field	117	5.8	N/A
Conservative	Mags Marrow	86	4.2	−5.7
Turnout		2,055	33.8	+3.6
Independent gain from Labour				

=== West Pennine ===
West Pennine
Party	Candidate	Votes	%	±%
Conservative	Neil Slater*	1,139	53.9	+2.0
Labour	Simon Charlesworth	973	46.1	+13.4
Turnout		2,157	35.1	–2.3
Conservative hold		Swing	▼5.7	

== Changes 2024–2026 ==
- 27 February 2026: Elaine Whittingham (Ewood) left the Labour Party, citing the toxic and divisive tone of national politics and abuse she had received on social media, and continued to sit as an independent councillor.
- March 2026: Tasleem Fazal (Billinge & Beardwood) left the Labour Party and joined the 4 BwD independent group.
