= 2010 Blackburn with Darwen Borough Council election =

Results of the 2010 Blackburn with Darwen Borough Council election

Elections to Blackburn with Darwen Borough Council were held on 6 May 2010. They coincided with the 2010 United Kingdom general election and the other 2010 United Kingdom local elections. One third of the council was up for election.

== Ward results ==
=== Audley ===
Audley
Party	Candidate	Votes	%	±%
Labour	Salim Sidat	1,901	53.2	
Liberal Democrats	Salim Lorgat	1473	41.2	
Independent	Saadat Ali	200	5.6	
Majority		428		
Labour gain from Liberal Democrats		Swing		

=== Bastwell ===
Bastwell
Party	Candidate	Votes	%	±%
Labour	Parwaiz Akhtar	1,967	50.6	
Liberal Democrats	Saj Ali	1923	49.4	
Majority		44		
Labour gain from Liberal Democrats		Swing		

=== Beardwood with Lammack ===
Beardwood with Lammack
Party	Candidate	Votes	%	±%
Conservative	James Hurst	1,973	61.7	
Labour	Ashleigh Whalley	1227	38.3	
Majority		746		
Conservative hold		Swing		

=== Corporation Park ===
Corporation Park
Party	Candidate	Votes	%	±%
Labour	John Wright	1,992	59.9	
Liberal Democrats	Ansar Rafiq	1122	33.7	
Independent	Ismail Patel	212	6.4	
Majority		870		
Labour hold		Swing		

=== East Rural ===
East Rural
Party	Candidate	Votes	%	±%
Conservative	Julie Slater	756	62.3	
Liberal Democrats	Brian Dunning	188	15.5	
Labour	Frank Davis	184	15.2	
For Darwen	Nella Melia	86	7.1	
Majority		568		
Conservative hold		Swing		

=== Ewood ===
Ewood
Party	Candidate	Votes	%	±%
Labour	Florence Oldfield	1,390	58.3	
Conservative	Lee Black	995	41.7	
Majority		395		
Labour hold		Swing		

=== Fernhurst ===
Fernhurst
Party	Candidate	Votes	%	±%
Conservative	Denise Gee	1,411	47.6	
Labour	Annette Murphy	899	30.3	
Liberal Democrats	Daniel Wilson	501	16.9	
For Darwen	Wilf Helliwell	156	5.3	
Majority		512		
Conservative gain from England First		Swing		

=== Higher Croft ===
Higher Croft
Party	Candidate	Votes	%	±%
Labour	Andy Kay	1,361	48.7	
Conservative	Paul Marrow	885	31.6	
BNP	Darren Jeal	551	19.7	
Majority		476		
Labour hold		Swing		

=== Little Harwood ===
Little Harwood
Party	Candidate	Votes	%	±%
Labour	Pat McFall	1,360	47.6	
Liberal Democrats	Abu Lorgat	852	29.8	
Conservative	Ashgar Ali	647	22.6	
Majority		508		
Labour hold		Swing		

=== Livesey with Pleasington ===
Livesey with Pleasington
Party	Candidate	Votes	%	±%
Conservative	John Pearson	2,660	68.3	
Labour	Katie Howarth	1236	31.7	
Majority		1324		
Conservative hold		Swing		

=== Marsh House ===
Marsh House
Party	Candidate	Votes	%	±%
Liberal Democrats	Chris Thayne	915	30.3	
Conservative	Neil Slater	851	28.2	
Labour	Frank Connor	835	27.6	
For Darwen	Stephen Potter	419	13.9	
Majority		64		
Liberal Democrats hold		Swing		

=== Meadowhead ===
Meadowhead
Party	Candidate	Votes	%	±%
Conservative	Konrad Tapp	1,395	52.1	
Labour	Carl Nuttall	1285	47.9	
Majority		110		
Conservative gain from England First		Swing		

=== Mill Hill ===
Mill Hill
Party	Candidate	Votes	%	±%
Labour	Jim Smith	1,055	43.8	
Liberal Democrats	Alan Dean	583	24.2	
Conservative	James Kenyon	436	18.1	
BNP	Robin Evans	332	13.8	
Majority		472		
Labour hold		Swing		

=== Queen's Park ===
Queen's Park
Party	Candidate	Votes	%	±%
Labour	Salim Mulla	1,511	64.5	
Liberal Democrats	Faraz Ali	833	35.5	
Majority		678		
Labour hold		Swing		

=== Roe Lee ===
Roe Lee
Party	Candidate	Votes	%	±%
Conservative	David Pearson	1,721	56.0	
Labour	Phil Riley	1354	44.0	
Majority		367		
Conservative hold		Swing		

=== Shadsworth with Whitebirk ===
Shadsworth with Whitebirk
Party	Candidate	Votes	%	±%
Labour	Tony Humphreys	1,548	59.0	
Conservative	Lorraine Chesterton	593	22.6	
BNP	Glenn Evans	484	18.4	
Majority		955		
Labour hold		Swing		

=== Shear Brow ===
Shear Brow
Party	Candidate	Votes	%	±%
Labour	Shahabuddin Solkar	1,559	45.1	
Independent	Arif Waghat	794	23.0	
Conservative	Zah Hussein	576	16.7	
Liberal Democrats	Hanif Patel	524	15.2	
Majority		765		
Labour gain from Liberal Democrats		Swing		

=== Sudell ===
Sudell
Party	Candidate	Votes	%	±%
Labour	Eileen Entwistle	813	32.4	
Liberal Democrats	Mark Davies	793	31.6	
Conservative	Angela Lee	454	18.1	
For Darwen	Heather Ashurst	448	17.9	
Majority		20		
Labour hold		Swing		

=== Sunnyhurst ===
Sunnyhurst
Party	Candidate	Votes	%	±%
Labour	Dave Smith	1,296	43.3	
Conservative	David Collier	680	22.8	
Liberal Democrats	John East	523		
For Darwen	Martin McCaughran	486	16.3	
Majority		616		
Labour hold		Swing		

=== Wensley Fold ===
Wensley Fold
Party	Candidate	Votes	%	±%
Labour	Mohammed Khan	1,926	74.7	
Conservative	Nasser Sajid	653	25.3	
Majority		1273		
Labour hold		Swing		

=== Whitehall ===
Whitehall
Party	Candidate	Votes	%	±%
Liberal Democrats	David Foster	1,142	53.2	
Conservative	Andrew Baker	503	23.4	
Labour	Brian Taylor	284	13.2	
For Darwen	Joan Helliwell	216	10.1	
Majority		639		
Liberal Democrats hold		Swing		
