= 2016 Blackburn with Darwen Borough Council election =

2016 UK local government election

← 2015	5 May 2016	2018 →

22 council seats
- Turnout: .**%
	First party	Second party	Third party
Leader	Mohammed Khan	Mike Lee
Party	Labour	Conservative	Liberal Democrats
Leader since	2015	2009
Last election	53.9%	34.4%	*.*%
Seats won	14	6	2
Seat change	▼2	▲2	Steady
Popular vote	20,649	10,481	1,892
Percentage	58.2%	29.5%	5.3%
Swing	▲**.**%	▼**.**%	▼%
Council control before election
Labour Party (UK)
Council control after election
Labour Party (UK)

Results of the 2016 Blackburn with Darwen Borough Council election

The 2016 Blackburn with Darwen Borough Council election took place on 5 May 2016 to elect members of Blackburn with Darwen Borough Council in England. This was the same day as other local elections.

The elections saw a gain of two seats by the Conservative Party from the Labour Party.

The resulting balance on the council after the elections was:

Labour 44

Conservative 16

Liberal Democrat 3

Independent 1

== Election result ==
Blackburn with Darwen Borough Council local election result 2016
Party	Seats	Gains	Losses	Net gain/loss	Seats %	Votes %	Votes	+/−
Labour	14	0	2	▼2	63.64	58.2	20,649	+**.**%
Conservative	6	2	0	▲2	27.27	29.5	10,481	-*.*%
Liberal Democrats	2	0	0	Steady	9.09	5.3	1,892	-*.*%
UKIP	0	0	0	Steady	0	4.8	1,692	+*.*%
Independent	0	0	0	Steady	0	2.2	783	+*.*%

After the election, the composition of the council was as follows:

Summary of the 5 May 2016 local election results for Blackburn with Darwen Council
Parties	Seats	Previous	Net Gain/Loss
Labour	44	46	-2
Conservative	16	14	+2
Liberal Democrats	3	3	0
Independent	1	1	0
Total	64	64	

== Council Composition ==
Prior to the election the composition of the council was:

↓
46	14	3	1
Labour	Conservative	Lib Dem	I

After the election, the composition of the council was:

↓
44	16	3	1
Labour	Conservative	Lib Dem	I

I - Independent

== Ward results ==
=== Audley ===
Audley
Party	Candidate	Votes	%	±%
Conservative	Saleem Kapadi	508		
Independent	Raja Basharat Hussin Khan	126		
Labour	Zamir Khan	1587		
Spoilt Ballots		31		
Majority				
Turnout		2334	39.1	
Labour hold		Swing		

=== Bastwell ===
Bastwell
Party	Candidate	Votes	%	±%
Conservative	Sabir Esa	492		
Labour	Shaukat Hussain	2151		
Spoilt Ballots		22		
Majority				
Turnout		2665	52.3	
Labour hold		Swing		

=== Beardwood with Lammack ===
Beardwood with Lammack
Party	Candidate	Votes	%	±%
Conservative	Julie Margaret Daley	1105		
Labour	Paul Mason	660		
Spoilt Ballots		16		
Majority				
Turnout		1781	39.5	
Conservative hold		Swing		

=== Corporation Park ===
Corporation Park
Party	Candidate	Votes	%	±%
Labour	Tassy Fazal	1821		
Conservative	Riaz Valli	303		
Spoilt Ballots		33		
Majority				
Turnout		2157	45.1	
Labour hold		Swing		

=== Earcroft ===
Earcroft
Party	Candidate	Votes	%	±%
Labour	Stephanie Rose Brookfield	399		
Liberal Democrats	John East	106		
Conservative	Lynn Perkins	299		
Spoilt Ballots		13		
Majority				
Turnout		817	26.9	
Labour hold		Swing		

=== Ewood ===
Ewood
Party	Candidate	Votes	%	±%
Labour	Jamie Groves	841		
Conservative	Eleanor Sutcliffe	285		
Spoilt Ballots		16		
Majority				
Turnout		1142	25.05	
Labour hold		Swing		

=== Fernhurst ===
Fernhurst
Party	Candidate	Votes	%	±%
Conservative	John Slater	791		
Labour	Donna Marie Talbot	442		
Spoilt Ballots		9		
Majority				
Turnout		29.8	1242	
Conservative hold		Swing		

=== Higher Croft ===
Higher Croft
Party	Candidate	Votes	%	±%
Conservative	Michael Brooks	309		
Labour	Don McKinlay			
Spoilt Ballots		23		
Majority				
Turnout		1206	23.9	
Labour hold		Swing		

=== Little Harwood ===
Little Harwood
Party	Candidate	Votes	%	±%
UKIP	Liz Lawson	331		
Labour	Abdul Samad Patel	1409		
Conservative	Ghulam Sabir	162		
Spoilt Ballots		19		
Majority				
Turnout		1921	40.9	
Labour hold		Swing		

=== Livesey with Pleasington ===
Livesey with Pleasington
Party	Candidate	Votes	%	±%
Labour	Adam Holden	639		
Conservative	Paul Marrow	1427		
Spoilt Ballots		17		
Majority				
Turnout		2083	39.2	
Conservative hold		Swing		

=== Marsh House ===
Marsh House
Party	Candidate	Votes	%	±%
UKIP	Madeline Allen-Holmes	258		
Labour	Frank Connor	558		
Liberal Democrats	Simon Huggill	279		
Conservative	Neil Slater	560		
Spoilt Ballots		14		
Majority				
Turnout		1669	36.53	
Conservative hold		Swing		

=== Meadowhead ===
Meadowhead
Party	Candidate	Votes	%	±%
Conservative	Keith Murray	743		
Labour	Ashley Richard Whalley	660		
Spoilt Ballots		23		
Majority				
Turnout		1426	33.8	
Conservative hold		Swing		

=== Mill Hill ===
Mill Hill
Party	Candidate	Votes	%	±%
UKIP	Michael Longbottom	309		
Labour	Carl Peter Nuttall	702		
Conservative	Ann Marie Tolley	152		
Spoilt Ballots		6		
Majority				
Turnout		1169	30.1	
Labour hold		Swing		

=== North Turton with Tockholes ===
North Turton with Tockholes
Party	Candidate	Votes	%	±%
Independent	Phil McDermott	657		
Conservative	Colin Rigby	692		
Labour	Diane Catherine Waddington	274		
Spoilt Ballots		8		
Majority				
Turnout		1631	46.87	
Conservative hold		Swing		

=== Queen's Park ===
Queen's Park
Party	Candidate	Votes	%	±%
Labour	Faryad Hussain	932		
Conservative	Imraan Valimulla	239		
Spoilt Ballots		32		
Majority				
Turnout		1203	29.4	
Labour hold		Swing		

=== Roe Lee ===
Roe Lee
Party	Candidate	Votes	%	±%
Labour	Sylvia Liddle	968		
Conservative	Maureen McGarvey	727		
Spoilt Ballots		19		
Majority				
Turnout		1714	37.9	
Labour hold		Swing		

=== Shadsworth with Whitebirk ===
Shadsworth with Whitebirk
Party	Candidate	Votes	%	±%
UKIP	Michael Andrew Madigan	349		
Labour	Vicky McGurk	876		
Conservative	Margaret Rawlinson	86		
Spoilt Ballots		6		
Majority				
Turnout		1317	25.1	
Labour hold		Swing		

=== Shear Brow ===
Shear Brow
Party	Candidate	Votes	%	±%
Conservative	Mohmed Irfan Balapatel	543		
Labour	Suleman Khonat	1811		
Spoilt Ballots		25		
Majority				
Turnout		2379	46.8	
Labour hold		Swing		

=== Sudell ===
Sudell
Party	Candidate	Votes	%	±%
Conservative	Jean Brindle	145		
Liberal Democrats	Roy Davies	741		
Labour	Kate Stirton	478		
Spoilt Ballots		11		
Majority				
Turnout		1375	30.37	
Liberal Democrats hold		Swing		

=== Sunnyhurst ===
Sunnyhurst
Party	Candidate	Votes	%	±%
Conservative	Travis Frain	337		
UKIP	Ian Grimshaw	279		
Labour	Peter Andrew Hollings	1015		
Liberal Democrats	Ros Myers	116		
Spoilt Ballots		17		
Majority				
Turnout		1764	39.4	
Labour hold		Swing		

=== Wensley Fold ===
Wensley Fold
Party	Candidate	Votes	%	±%
Labour	Dave Harling	1392		
Conservative	Tariq Mahmood	309		
Spoilt Ballots		32		
Majority				
Turnout		1733	38.4	
Labour hold		Swing		

=== Whitehall ===
Whitehall
Party	Candidate	Votes	%	±%
Labour	Joanne Sarah Birkner	160		
Conservative	Steve Duncan	267		
Liberal Democrats	Karimeh Foster	650		
UKIP	Austin Molloy	166		
Spoilt Ballots		14		
Majority				
Turnout		1257	41.27	
Liberal Democrats hold		Swing		
