= 2008 Blackburn with Darwen Borough Council election =

2008 UK local government election

Results of the 2008 Blackburn with Darwen Borough Council election

Elections to Blackburn with Darwen Borough Council were held in 2008 on 1 May along with all other local elections in the UK.

== Election result ==
The party tallies before the 2008 poll were different from the results from the 2007 election. Arif Waghat was sacked from the Liberal Democrats in August 2007 and Michael Johnson quit For Darwen in March 2008. Both are continuing as independents.

In this first summary, "seats" represent the number of wards each party are defending.

Blackburn with Darwen local election result 2008
Party	Seats	Gains	Losses	Net gain/loss	Seats %	Votes %	Votes	+/−
Labour	12	0	0	0	0	0	0	0
Conservative	6	0	0	0	0	0	0	0
Liberal Democrats	4	0	0	0	0	0	0	0
For Darwen	0	0	0	0	0	0	0	0
Independent	0	0	0	0	0	0	0	0

This summary shows the picture for the whole council.

Summary of the 1 May 2008 local election results for Blackburn with Darwen Council
Parties	Seats	Previous	Net Gain/Loss
Labour		31	
Conservative		17	
Liberal Democrats		11	
For Darwen		3	
Independent		2	
Total		64	64

== Ward results ==
=== Audley ===
Previously won by ? in 200? with a majority of ?

Audley
Party	Candidate	Votes	%	±%
Independent	Saadat Ali	100		
Liberal Democrats	Ash Hussain	1102		
Labour	Zamir Khan	1214		
Spoilt Ballots		109		

=== Bastwell ===
Previously won by ? in 200? with a majority of ?

Bastwell
Party	Candidate	Votes	%	±%
Labour	Parwaiz Akhtar	1351		
Liberal Democrats	Mohammed Rizwan	1582		
Spoilt Ballots		131		

=== Beardwood with Lammack ===
Previously won by ? in 200? with a majority of ?

Beardwood with Lammack
Party	Candidate	Votes	%	±%
Labour	Donna Bowlay-Williams	353		
Conservative	Sheila June Williams	1586		
Spoilt Ballots		30		

=== Corporation Park ===
Previously won by Labour in 2007 with a majority of 305.

Corporation Park
Party	Candidate	Votes	%	±%
Labour	Shaukat Hussain	1082		
Liberal Democrats	Abdul Rehman	1196		
Spoilt Ballots		108		

=== Earcroft ===
Previously won by ? in 200? with a majority of ?

Earcroft
Party	Candidate	Votes	%	±%
Labour	Moira Barrett	390		
Liberal Democrats	Brian Dunning	65		
Conservative	Vince Hitchen	233		
For Darwen	Anthony Meleady	493		
England First	Mark Waring	130		
Spoilt Ballots		37		

=== Ewood ===
Previously won by ? in 200? with a majority of ?

Ewood
Party	Candidate	Votes	%	±%
Labour	Florence Oldfield	635		
Conservative	Joseph Anthony Smith	638		
Spoilt Ballots		–		

=== Fernhurst ===
Previously won by ? in 200? with a majority of ?

Fernhurst
Party	Candidate	Votes	%	±%
Labour	Barbara Arkley	256		
Green	David Carter	112		
For Darwen	Glenn Evans	143		
Conservative	John Slater	981		
Spoilt Ballots		11		

=== Higher Croft ===
Previously won by ? in 200? with a majority of ?

Higher Croft
Party	Candidate	Votes	%	±%
BNP	Darren Jeal	396		
Conservative	Jim Kenyon	487		
Labour	Dorothy Walsh	723		
Spoilt Ballots		37		

=== Little Harwood ===
Previously won by ? in 200? with a majority of ?

Little Harwood
Party	Candidate	Votes	%	±%
Conservative	Imran Khan	949		
Labour	Abdul Samad Patel	976		
Spoilt Ballots		63		

=== Livesey with Pleasington ===
Previously won by ? in 200? with a majority of ?

Livesey with Pleasington
Party	Candidate	Votes	%	±%
Conservative	Alan Cottam	2060		
Labour	Elaine Whittingham	413		
Spoilt Ballots		36		

=== Marsh House ===
Previously won by ? in 200? with a majority of ?

Marsh House
Party	Candidate	Votes	%	±%
Labour	Frank Connor	506		
Liberal Democrats	Kevin Connor	491		
Conservative	Denise Gee	502		
For Darwen	Phil Jones	650		
Spoilt Ballots		2		

=== Meadowhead ===
Previously won by ? in 200? with a majority of ?

Meadowhead
Party	Candidate	Votes	%	±%
Conservative	Brian Gerard Gordon	996		
Labour	Carl Nuttall	642		
Spoilt Ballots		26		

=== Mill Hill ===
Previously won by ? in 200? with a majority of ?

Mill Hill
Party	Candidate	Votes	%	±%
Liberal Democrats	Alan Dean	608		
Labour	Malcom Terence Doherty	676		
Spoilt Ballots		48		

=== North Turton with Tockholes ===
Previously won by ? in 200? with a majority of ?

North Turton with Tockholes
Party	Candidate	Votes	%	±%
England First	Nicholas Holt	173		
Labour	Bernard Mathews	220		
Green	Kenneth Graham McIver	346		
For Darwen	Steve Potter	74		
Conservative	Colin Rigby	854		
Spoilt Ballots		16		

=== Queen's Park ===
Previously won by ? in 200? with a majority of ?

Queen's Park
Party	Candidate	Votes	%	±%
Labour	Faryad Hussain	756		
Liberal Democrats	Salim Ismail Makda	722		
Spoilt Ballots		80		

=== Roe Lee ===
Previously won by ? in 200? with a majority of ?

Roe Lee
Party	Candidate	Votes	%	±%
Independent	Trevor Holden	177		
Conservative	Michael Joseph Law-Riding	1134		
Labour	Phil Riley	434		
Spoilt Ballots		22		

=== Shadsworth with Whitebirk ===
Previously won by ? in 200? with a majority of ?

Shadsworth with Whitebirk
Party	Candidate	Votes	%	±%
Labour	Ron O'Keeffe	804		
Conservative	Simon Wilkinson	526		
Spoilt Ballots		39		

=== Shear Brow ===
Previously won by ? in 200? with a majority of ?

Shear Brow
Party	Candidate	Votes	%	±%
Liberal Democrats	Iiyas Akubat	1218		
Independent	Francis Kwasi Beeby Apaloo	144		
Labour	Solly Khonat	1449		
Spoilt Ballots		136		

=== Sudell ===
Previously won by ? in 200? with a majority of ?

Sudell
Party	Candidate	Votes	%	±%
For Darwen	Heather Ashurst	636		
Liberal Democrats	Paul Browne	686		
Labour	Nigel Anthony Nuttall	282		
Spoilt Ballots		28		

=== Sunnyhurst ===
Previously won by ? in 200? with a majority of ?

Sunnyhurst
Party	Candidate	Votes	%	±%
For Darwen	Andrew Graham	875		
Conservative	David James Grogan	366		
Liberal Democrats	Pietro Sciambarella	124		
Labour	David Smith	808		
Spoilt Ballots		23		

=== Wensley Fold ===
Previously won by ? in 200? with a majority of ?

Wensley Fold
Party	Candidate	Votes	%	±%
Labour	Dave Harling	1088		
Conservative	Mark Slater	424		
Spoilt Ballots		55		

=== Whitehall ===
Previously won by ? in 200? with a majority of ?

Whitehall
Party	Candidate	Votes	%	±%
For Darwen	Margaret Binns	357		
Labour	Frank Davis	88		
Liberal Democrats	Karimeh Foster	778		
Conservative	Angela Lee	191		
Spoilt Ballots		46		
