= 2012 Preston City Council election =

2012 UK local government election

Results of the 2012 Preston City Council election

Elections to Preston City Council took place on 3 May 2012, the same day as other 2012 United Kingdom local elections.

Preston council is elected "in thirds", which means one councillor from each three-member ward, and one councillor from a number of two-member wards, are elected each year, followed by one year free from elections to ensure all councillors serve a full term.

In 2012 two wards had 'double elections' due to early resignations.

Due to the "in thirds" system, the 2012 election results below are directly compared with the corresponding elections in 2008, with the change in vote share calculated on this basis. Other elections can be found at Preston local elections.

== Summary ==
Preston local election result 2012
Party	Seats	Gains	Losses	Net gain/loss	Seats %	Votes %	Votes	+/−
Labour	7	3	-1	9		46.1	14,191	+40.1
Conservative	8		-2	6		31.6	9,718	-27.8
Liberal Democrats	3		1	2		13.7	4,207	-73.4
Independent	1	1		2		6.5	1,990	+55.2
Green						1.3	391	+81.1
England First						1.0	293	+63.0

== Ashton ==
Won in corresponding 2008 elections by Conservative Party, majority 113. Ashton was a Labour gain from the Conservatives at the 2011 elections

Preston City Council elections: Ashton ward 2012
Party	Candidate	Votes	%	±%
Labour	Elizabeth Wildgoose	682	55.3	+10.0
Conservative	Keith Sedgewick	480	38.9	−15.8
Liberal Democrats	Stephen Mullen	72	5.8	N/A
Majority		202		
Turnout		1,234		
Labour gain from Conservative		Swing		

== Brookfield ==
Won in corresponding 2008 elections by Conservatives, with a majority of 91. The Brookfield ward is in the north-east of the borough.

Preston City Council elections: Brookfield ward 2012
Party	Candidate	Votes	%	±%
Labour	Philip Corker	1,020	75.6	+28.7
Conservative	Christopher Rigby	329	24.4	−28.7
Majority		69.1		
Turnout		1,349		
Labour gain from Conservative		Swing		

== Cadley ==
Won in corresponding 2008 elections by Liberal Democrats, majority 386. When this councillor resigned in 2010, it was held by the Liberal Democrats in the resulting by-election. Cadley is at the west of the Fulwood area of the borough.

Preston City Council elections: Cadley ward 2012
Party	Candidate	Votes	%	±%
Liberal Democrats	John Potter	826	50.2	−6.9
Conservative	Yvonne Driver	411	25.0	−10.3
Labour	John Young	408	24.8	+17.7
Majority		415		
Turnout		1,645		

== Deepdale ==
Won in corresponding 2008 elections by an independent candidate, majority 348. Labour won the seat at the 2011 elections.

Preston City Council elections: Deepdale ward 2012
Party	Candidate	Votes	%	±%
Independent	Terry Cartwright	1,023	53.4	−4.0
Labour	Samir Vohra	865	45.1	+10.1
Conservative	Sheila Heys	28	1.5	−6.1
Majority		158		
Turnout		1,916		

== Fishwick ==
Won in corresponding 2008 elections by the Labour Party, majority over the Liberal Democrats of 41. The former township lies to the east of the A6 London Road.

Preston City Council elections: Fishwick ward 2012
Party	Candidate	Votes	%	±%
Labour	Martyn Rawlinson	909	84.3	+36.2
Conservative	Steve Allen	169	15.7	N/A
Majority		740		
Turnout		1,078		

== Garrison ==
Won in corresponding 2008 elections by Conservative Party, majority 883. Garrison is in the northeast of the borough, with Fulwood Barracks at its centre.

Preston City Council elections: Garrison ward 2012
Party	Candidate	Votes	%	±%
Conservative	Stuart Greenhalgh	828	50.2	−16.6
Labour	Steve Ratcliffe	566	34.3	+16.4
Green	Ian McCormick	146	8.9	N/A
Liberal Democrats	Greg Vickers	109	6.6	−8.7
Majority		262		
Turnout		1,649		

== Greyfriars ==
Won in corresponding 2008 elections by Conservative Party, majority 1,237. It lies at the north of the Fulwood area, with the M55 motorway at its northern edge, intersected by the West Coast Main Line. The ward is predominantly suburban, and a white population of nearly 95%

Preston City Council elections: Greyfriars ward 2012
Party	Candidate	Votes	%	±%
Conservative	Damien Moore	1,077	55.1	−16.2
Labour	Alan Woods	550	28.1	+18.1
Liberal Democrats	Michael Yates	328	16.8	−1.9
Majority		527		
Turnout		1,955		

== Ingol ==
Won in corresponding 2008 elections by Liberal Democrats, majority 154. Ingol and Tanteron lie in the north of the borough, to the east of the A6 Garstang Road.

Preston City Council elections: Ingol ward 2012
Party	Candidate	Votes	%	±%
Liberal Democrats	Pauline Brown	698	43.3	−5.6
Labour	John Rochford	572	35.5	+24.3
Conservative	Andrew Jagger-Walker	342	21.2	−18.7
Majority		126		
Turnout		1,612		

=== Ingol and Tanterton Neighbourhood Council ===
There were inaugural elections to a 10-member Neighbourhood Council covering the Ingol ward on the same day. There was 13 candidates, all independent.

== Larches ==
Won in corresponding 2008 elections by Liberal Democrats, majority 384. This ward has been won by the Labour Party in the preceding 2009 and 2010 elections

Preston City Council elections: Larches ward 2012
Party	Candidate	Votes	%	±%
Labour	Mark Yates	863	48.2	+9.9
Liberal Democrats	Elaine Abbot	732	40.8	−20.9
Conservative	Owen Wordley	197	11.0	N/A
Majority		131		
Turnout		1,792		
Labour gain from Liberal Democrats		Swing		

== Lea ==
Won in corresponding 2008 elections by the Conservative Party, gaining from the Liberal Democrats, with a majority of 88. The ward is coterminous with Lea and Cottam civil parish.

Preston City Council elections: Lea ward 2012
Party	Candidate	Votes	%	±%
Conservative	Trevor Hart	773	50.0	+1.4
Labour	Lee Bradshaw	404	26.1	+18.4
Liberal Democrats	Jason Jeffrey	369	23.9	−19.8
Majority		369		
Turnout		1,546		

== Rural East ==
Preston Rural East is a large rural division won in corresponding 2008 elections by Conservative Party, majority 785. The ward contains the civil parishes of Broughton, Haighton, and Grimsargh.

Preston City Council elections: Preston Rural East ward 2012
Party	Candidate	Votes	%	±%
Conservative	Thomas Davies	741	62.4	−11.5
Labour	Gerard Parke-Hatton	273	23.0	+13.9
Green	Ulrike Zeshan	92	8.3	N/A
Liberal Democrats	Peter Lawrence	81	7.3	−9.7
Majority		468		
Turnout		1,187		

== Rural North ==
Won in corresponding 2008 elections by Conservative Party, majority 1,628, the ward of Preston Rural North covers the civil parishes of Woodplumpton, Barton, Whittingham, and Goosnargh

Due to the resignation of Councillor Kate Calder the poll for Rural North was a double vacancy, making direct comparison with the corresponding 2008 election too inaccurate.

Preston City Council elections: Preston Rural North ward 2012
Party	Candidate	Votes	%	±%
Conservative	Lona Smith	1,423		
Conservative	Alexandra Thompson-Ortega	1,208		
Labour	Alan Mathews	353		
Liberal Democrats	Rebecca Finch	269		

== Ribbleton ==
Won in corresponding 2008 elections by Labour Party, majority 381 over the Conservatives. Situated in the east of the borough, Ribbleton extends across to the Red Scar industrial estate in addition to the mix of suburban and terraced communities closer to Preston City Centre. Parts of the division are amongst the most deprived in England

Preston City Council elections: Ribbleton ward 2012
Party	Candidate	Votes	%	±%
Labour	Nicholas Pomfret	881	66.1	+9.1
England First	Mark Cotterill	293	22.0	N/A
Conservative	Daryl Bamber	158	11.9	−15.8
Majority		588		
Turnout		1,332		

== Riversway ==
Won in corresponding 2008 elections by Labour Party, majority 251. Labour regained the seat in a 2010 by-election. Riversway contains the former Preston Dock, suburban residential areas and County Hall.

Preston City Council elections: Riversway ward 2012
Party	Candidate	Votes	%	±%
Labour	Linda Crompton	955	80.1	+38.2
Conservative	Hussain Mulla	125	10.5	−3.3
Liberal Democrats	Wilf Gavin	112	9.4	−14.0
Majority		830		
Turnout		1,192		

== Sharoe Green ==
Won in corresponding 2008 elections by Conservative Party, majority 787. This division contains the Royal Preston Hospital.

Preston City Council elections: Sharoe Green ward 2012
Party	Candidate	Votes	%	±%
Conservative	David Walker	856	45.6	−16.9
Labour	John Wilson	734	39.1	+22.3
Green	Helen Disley	153	8.1	N/A
Liberal Democrats	Peter Mylroie	136	7.2	−13.5
Majority		122		
Turnout		1,879		

== St George's ==
Won in corresponding 2008 elections by Labour, majority 173, the ward of St George's consists of terraces off Deepdale Road, some University of Central Lancashire Halls of Residence, and recently built private apartments. The ward has a population which is approximately 65% white and 30% Asian.

Due to the resignation of Councillor Taalib Shamduddin the contest for St George's was a double vacancy, which makes direct comparison with the corresponding 2008 election inaccurate.

Preston City Council elections: St George's ward 2012
Party	Candidate	Votes	%	±%
Labour	Anis Faruki	679		
Labour	James Hull	659		
Conservative	Louise Petherwick	71		
Conservative	Philip Ceurden	61		
Liberal Democrats	Stephen Wilkinson	54		

== St Matthew's ==
Won in corresponding 2008 elections by Labour Party, majority 199, the St Matthew's ward contains Preston Prison at the far corner of the ward, at the junction of the A6 London Road. At the 2001 Census, the ethnic profile of St Matthews was over 70% white, with three areas within the division amongst the 10% most deprived in England

Preston City Council elections: St Matthews ward 2012
Party	Candidate	Votes	%	±%
Labour	Veronica Afrin	1,114	89.3	+25.4
Conservative	Linda Hubberstey	133	10.7	−5.8
Majority		981		
Turnout		1,247		

== Town Centre ==
Based on the areas of Avenham, Frenchwood and the City Centre, the ward of Town Centre is the largest non-rural ward in the borough. The 2008 result was a Labour hold, with a majority of 74 over an independent candidate. The ward is over 60% white and almost a third Asian or Asian British

Preston City Council elections: Town Centre ward 2012
Party	Candidate	Votes	%	±%
Independent	Michael Lavalette	967	48.5	N/A
Labour	Salim Desai	872	43.8	+2.9
Conservative	David Treasure	154	7.7	−5.2
Majority		95		
Turnout		1,993		
Independent gain from Labour		Swing		

== Tulketh ==
Won in corresponding 2008 elections by Labour Party, majority 54 over the Liberal Democrats, and in a by-election later that year with a majority of 23.

Preston City Council elections: Tulketh ward 2012
Party	Candidate	Votes	%	±%
Labour	Matthew Brown	832	59.1	+22.7
Liberal Democrats	Neil Darby	421	29.9	−2.6
Conservative	Sharon Riley	154	10.9	−20.1
Majority		411		
Turnout		1,407		
