= 2012 Blackburn with Darwen Borough Council election =

Local election in Lancashire, UK

Results of the 2012 Blackburn with Darwen Borough Council election

2012 Elections to Blackburn with Darwen Borough Council were held on 3 May 2012, alongside other local elections across the United Kingdom. 22 seats (one third) of the council were up for election. The Labour Party remained in control of the council.

== Results summary ==
Results
Party	Seats	Change
Labour Party	35	▲7
Conservative Party	14	▼3
Liberal Democrats	5	▼1
Other	0	▼3

== See also ==
- Blackburn with Darwen Borough Council elections
