= 2014 Blackburn with Darwen Borough Council election =

2014 UK local government election

- 22 May 2014

21 council seats
- Turnout: %
	First party	Second party	Third party
Leader		Mike Lee
Party	Labour	Conservative	Liberal Democrats
Leader since		2009
Seats won	17	4	1
Swing	▲%	▼%	▼%
Council control before election
Labour Party (UK)
Council control after election
Labour Party (UK)

Results of the 2014 Blackburn with Darwen Borough Council election

The 2014 Blackburn with Darwen Borough Council election took place on 22 May 2014 to elect members of Blackburn with Darwen Council in England. This was on the same day as other local elections.
