= Mark Cotterill =

British politician

Mark Adrian Cotterill (born 3 October 1960) is a far right political figure and former borough councillor in Lancashire, who has been involved in a number of movements throughout his career. He is noted for activity to establish links between the far right in Britain and America, by founding the American Friends of the British National Party, and since 1999 as the long-serving editor and publisher of the nationalist journal Heritage and Destiny.

== National Front and Patriotic Forum years ==
Cotterill was a member of the National Front (NF) from 1977 to 1979 and again from 1984 to 1992, and was the party's South West England organiser from 1985 to 1991. He "helped promulgate the New Atlantic Charter, signed between the National Front and the Nationalist Movement, pledging Anglo-American solidarity" and was "instrumental in arranging the exchange visit of (Nick) Griffin to America".

In 1992 Cotterill left the NF and formed the Patriotic Forum. The Patriotic Forum was largely composed of fellow ex-NF members, such as Darren Copeland (as Chairman), Keith Jowsey (as secretary), and Alan Harvey. The Patriotic Forum published a right-wing conservative magazine entitled British Patriot which Cotterill edited, and which also featured articles by Steve Brady and Alan Harvey.

Alan Harvey had formed the short-lived White Rhino Club, which supported apartheid in South Africa; Harvey later accused Cotterill of sabotaging the club's activities, but without substantiating the claim. In turn Cotterill claimed to have expelled Harvey from the Patriotic Forum, although the organisation had no formal membership. Cotterill was, for a short time, a member of the Conservative Party in Torquay in 1993, and was active in the Revolutionary Conservative Caucus. In 1994, he was attacked, receiving severe head injuries, by two members of Anti-Fascist Action who were subsequently "charged with unlawful wounding". He stood as an Independent Conservative in the local elections in 1995.

Cotterill wound up the Patriotic Forum and ceased publication of British Patriot in 1995.

== British National Party years ==
Cotterill then moved to the British National Party (BNP). In 1998, when he lived just outside Washington, D.C., he formed and ran the American Friends of the British National Party (AFBNP), which raised funds for the BNP.

While living in the United States he campaigned for David Duke in his bid to be elected to the United States Congress in 1999, and worked for Pat Buchanan's bid to be elected President of the United States in the 2000 U.S. presidential election. However, "Buchanan's campaign threw out Cotterill and other racist volunteers after their presence was exposed by the Center for New Community and other groups". This involved Buchanan losing three-quarters of his Northern Virginia campaign staff.

Cotterill became an associate of William Pierce, editing one issue of his Resistance magazine in 1999; he was also the U.S. distributor for Right Now! magazine. Cotterill was by now defined by the Southern Poverty Law Center as a "key British neofascist". In 2002, Cotterill was excluded from the U.S. for ten years.

== England First Party years ==
Back in England, Cotterill broke with the BNP and in 2004 founded the England First Party (EFP). Since 1999 he has published and edited an ethnic nationalist bimonthly magazine called Heritage and Destiny.

He was elected councillor for Meadowhead on Blackburn with Darwen Borough Council in the 2006 local elections as leader of the England First Party, defeating the incumbent Labour councillor by more than 400 votes. However, Cotterill resigned the seat in May 2007 and also stood down from the party leadership.

In the Preston local council elections in 2008, 2010, 2011 and 2012, Cotterill stood as the EFP candidate. In 2009 he was a candidate for the Preston East division of Lancashire County Council.

== Media coverage ==
On 7 May 2019, Cotterill was interviewed for an article about the UK far right published in the Financial Times.

On 21 September 2023, the Lancashire Evening Post detailed how Cotterill hired a conference room claiming it was for a meeting of military veterans (securing a discount) whereas in reality it was for his far right group Heritage and Destiny.
