= 2023 Blackburn with Darwen Borough Council election =

- 4 May 2023

17 of 51 seats to Blackburn with Darwen Borough Council 26 seats needed for a majority
- Turnout: 27.4%

	First party	Second party
Leader	Phil Riley	John Slater
Party	Labour	Conservative
Last election	36 seats, 60.3%	13 seats, 32.4%
Seats before	37	13
Seats won	14	3
Seats after	39	12
Seat change	▲2	▼1
Popular vote	17,949	8,633
Percentage	63.0%	30.3%
Swing	▲2.7%	▼2.1%
- Winner of each seat at 2023 Blackburn with Darwen Borough Council election
Leader before election
Phil Riley
Labour
Leader after election
Phil Riley
Labour

The 2023 Blackburn with Darwen Borough Council election took place on 4 May 2023 to elect members of Blackburn with Darwen Borough Council. It took place on the same day as other local elections. Seventeen members of the council were elected, one from each of the wards. This set of seats was last up for election in 2019.

Labour retained its majority on the council, making two gains in Darwen.

== Background ==
The 17 seats being contested were held prior to the election as follows:

- Labour: 12 defences (25 other seats)
- Conservative: 4 defences (9 other seats)
- Liberal Democrat: 1 defence (0 other seats)

== Summary ==
=== Election result ===
2023 Blackburn with Darwen Borough Council election
Party	This election				Full council			This election		
Party	Candidates	Seats	Net	Seats %	Other	Total	Total %	Votes	Votes %	+/−
Labour	{{{candidates}}}	14	▲2	82.4	25	39	76.5	17,949	63.0	+2.7
Conservative	{{{candidates}}}	3	▼1	17.6	9	12	23.5	8,633	30.3	–2.1
Liberal Democrats	{{{candidates}}}	0	▼1	0.0	0	0	0.0	1,440	5.1	+1.8
Green	{{{candidates}}}	0	Steady	0.0	0	0	0.0	255	0.9	N/A
Independent	{{{candidates}}}	0	Steady	0.0	0	0	0.0	153	0.5	–3.6
ADF	{{{candidates}}}	0	Steady	0.0	0	0	0.0	56	0.2	N/A

=== Councillors standing down ===
Councillor	Ward	First elected	Party	Date announced
Paul Browne	Darwen East	2019	Liberal Democrats	28 March 2023
Zainab Rawat	Shear Brow and Corporation Park	2019	Labour	28 March 2023

== Ward results ==
Comparisons for the purpose of determining a gain, hold or loss of a seat, is to the last time these specific seats were up for election in 2019. An asterisk indicates the incumbent councillor (*).

The Statement of Persons Nominated details the candidates standing in each ward. It was released on 5 April 2023.

=== Audley & Queen's Park ===
Audley & Queen's Park
Party	Candidate	Votes	%	±%
Labour	Salim Sidat*	1,213	67.1	+27.6
Conservative	Amin Kapadia	333	18.4	+5.7
Independent	Tariq Mahmood	139	7.7	N/A
Liberal Democrats	Rameez Mukadam	109	6.0	N/A
Independent	Ahsan Bhatti	14	0.8	N/A
Spoilt Ballots	—	9	—	—
Majority		880	48.7	+40.4
Turnout		1,817	28.4	–4.6
Labour hold		Swing	▲11.0	

=== Bastwell & Daisyfield ===
Bastwell & Daisyfield
Party	Candidate	Votes	%	±%
Labour	Shaukat Hussain*	1,666	80.4	+4.0
Conservative	Ismail Ibrahim Bapu Patel	406	19.6	–4.0
Spoilt Ballots	—	9	—	—
Majority		1,260	60.8	+8.0
Turnout		2,081	35.2	–2.6
Labour hold		Swing	▲4.0	

=== Billinge & Beardwood ===
Billinge & Beardwood
Party	Candidate	Votes	%	±%
Labour	Jackie Floyd*	1,303	62.0	–2.7
Conservative	Imtiaz Ali	687	32.7	+5.0
Liberal Democrats	Tahir Mahmood	110	5.2	N/A
Spoilt Ballots	—	13	—	—
Majority		616	29.3	–7.7
Turnout		2,113	34.3	–2.9
Labour hold		Swing	▼3.9	

=== Blackburn Central ===
Blackburn Central
Party	Candidate	Votes	%	±%
Labour	Mahfooz Hussain*	1,043	76.4	+8.9
Conservative	Ghulam Sabir	220	16.1	–4.1
Liberal Democrats	Siama Bhatti	103	7.5	N/A
Spoilt Ballots	—	10	—	—
Majority		823	60.3	+13.0
Turnout		1,376	22.1	–3.9
Labour hold		Swing	▲6.5	

=== Blackburn South & Lower Darwen ===
Blackburn South & Lower Darwen
Party	Candidate	Votes	%	±%
Conservative	John Slater*	839	56.0	–4.0
Labour	Liz Johnson	659	44.0	+4.0
Spoilt Ballots	—	8	—	—
Majority		180	12.0	–8.0
Turnout		1,506	26.3	+0.6
Conservative hold		Swing	▼4.0	

=== Blackburn South East ===
Blackburn South East
Party	Candidate	Votes	%	±%
Labour	Vicky Ellen McGurk*	722	73.4	+0.3
Conservative	Henry Arnold	262	26.6	–0.3
Spoilt Ballots	—	20	—	—
Majority		460	46.8	+0.6
Turnout		1,004	16.7	–1.9
Labour hold		Swing	▲0.3	

=== Darwen East ===
Darwen East
Party	Candidate	Votes	%	±%
Labour	Matt Gibson	828	59.1	+4.6
Liberal Democrats	Mark Davies	351	25.1	–1.8
Conservative	Ryan Slater	222	15.8	–2.7
Spoilt Ballots	—	6	—	—
Majority		477	34.0	+6.4
Turnout		1,407	21.9	–3.7
Labour gain from Liberal Democrats		Swing	▲3.2	

=== Darwen South ===
Darwen South
Party	Candidate	Votes	%	±%
Labour	Anthony Nicholas Shaw	848	45.3	+7.0
Conservative	Lilian Salton*	764	40.8	–5.3
Liberal Democrats	Simon Huggill	204	10.9	–4.8
ADF	David Stephen Wilson-Parr	56	3.0	N/A
Spoilt Ballots	—	2	—	—
Majority		84	4.5	N/A
Turnout		1,874	28.8	–1.5
Labour gain from Conservative		Swing	▲6.2	

=== Darwen West ===
Darwen West
Party	Candidate	Votes	%	±%
Labour	Stephanie Rose Brookfield*	1,196	62.8	–2.9
Conservative	Janine Crook	596	31.3	+0.6
Liberal Democrats	Connor Plumley	113	5.9	+2.3
Spoilt Ballots	—	15	—	—
Majority		600	31.5	–3.5
Turnout		1,920	30.8	–3.9
Labour hold		Swing	▼1.8	

=== Ewood ===
Ewood
Party	Candidate	Votes	%	±%
Labour	Jim Casey*	740	58.2	–2.2
Conservative	Rick Moore	532	41.8	+2.2
Spoilt Ballots	—	11	—	—
Majority		208	16.4	–4.4
Turnout		1,283	20.8	–2.5
Labour hold		Swing	▼2.2	

=== Little Harwood & Whitebirk ===
Little Harwood & Whitebirk
Party	Candidate	Votes	%	±%
Labour	Mustafa Ali Desai*	1,222	80.3	+9.1
Conservative	Arshad Mahmood	203	13.3	–15.5
Liberal Democrats	Ahmed Miah	97	6.4	N/A
Spoilt Ballots	—	12	—	—
Majority		1,019	67.0	+24.6
Turnout		1,534	25.3	–6.7
Labour hold		Swing	▲12.3	

=== Livesey with Pleasington ===
Livesey with Pleasington
Party	Candidate	Votes	%	±%
Conservative	Paul David Marrow*	1,360	67.5	+1.5
Labour	Michael John Jackson	655	32.5	–1.5
Spoilt Ballots	—	11	—	—
Majority		705	35.0	+3.0
Turnout		2,026	31.5	–1.1
Conservative hold		Swing	▲1.5	

=== Mill Hill & Moorgate ===
Mill Hill & Moorgate
Party	Candidate	Votes	%	±%
Labour	Damian Talbot*	765	68.1	+5.6
Conservative	Les Cade	259	23.0	–14.5
Green	Robin Field	100	8.9	N/A
Spoilt Ballots	—	6	—	—
Majority		506	45.1	+20.1
Turnout		1,130	20.2	–2.9
Labour hold		Swing	▲10.1	

=== Roe Lee ===
Roe Lee
Party	Candidate	Votes	%	±%
Labour	Phil Riley*	1,182	67.4	+1.5
Conservative	Carl Lever	418	23.8	–10.3
Green	Paul Morley	155	8.8	N/A
Spoilt Ballots	—	13	—	—
Majority		764	43.6	N/A
Turnout		1,768	27.8	–5.5
Labour hold		Swing	▲5.9	

=== Shear Brow & Corporation Park ===
Shear Brow & Corporation Park
Party	Candidate	Votes	%	±%
Labour	Salma Patel	1,536	90.5	–0.4
Conservative	Zak Hussain	161	9.5	+0.4
Spoilt Ballots	—	18	—	—
Majority		1,375	81.0	N/A
Turnout		1,715	27.9	–5.7
Labour hold		Swing	▼0.4	

=== Wensley Fold ===
Wensley Fold
Party	Candidate	Votes	%	±%
Labour	Quesir Mahmood*	1,621	90.1	+1.1
Conservative	Margaret Marrow	179	9.9	–1.1
Spoilt Ballots	—	14	—	—
Majority		1,442	80.2	+2.2
Turnout		1,814	30.2	–1.7
Labour hold		Swing	▲1.1	

=== West Pennine ===
West Pennine
Party	Candidate	Votes	%	±%
Conservative	Jean Rigby*	1,192	51.9	–4.4
Labour	Liam Dobson	750	32.7	+0.1
Liberal Democrats	John East	353	15.4	+4.4
Spoilt Ballots		11		
Majority		442	19.2	–4.5
Turnout		2,306	37.4	–1.4
Conservative hold		Swing	▼2.3	

== Changes 2023–2024 ==
- Hussain Akhtar (Shear Brow & Corporation Park) left the Labour Party in July 2023 and sat as an independent councillor before rejoining Labour in February 2024.
- 14 October 2023: Mohammed Irfan (Billinge & Beardwood) was suspended by the Labour Party over an anti-Israel social media post, and sat thereafter as an independent councillor.
- 19 October 2023: Tiger Patel (Audley & Queen's Park) left the Conservative Party over the government's stance on the Israel–Gaza war and continued to sit as an independent councillor.
- 26 October 2023 – 6 November 2023: Saj Ali (Roe Lee), Abdul Patel (Little Harwood & Whitebirk), Salim Sidat (Audley & Queen's Park), Salma Patel (Shear Brow & Corporation Park), Mustafa Desai (Little Harwood & Whitebirk), Suleman Khonat (Shear Brow & Corporation Park) and Samim Desai (Blackburn Central) left the Labour Party over its position on the Israel–Gaza war, as part of the same wave of resignations, and continued to sit as independent councillors.
