= 2007 Blackburn with Darwen Borough Council election =

2007 UK local government election

Results of the 2007 Blackburn with Darwen Borough Council election

Elections to Blackburn with Darwen Borough Council were held in 2007 on 3 May – the same day as other local elections in the UK.

== Election result ==
Summary of the 3 May 2007 local election results for Blackburn with Darwen Council
Parties	Seats	Previous	Net Gain/Loss
Labour	31	32	-1
Conservative	17	15	+2
Liberal Democrats	13	13	0
For Darwen	3	1	+2
England First	0	0	0
Independent	0	1	-1
Vacant	0	2	-2
Total		64	64

== Ward results ==
=== Corporation Park ===
One councillor to be elected.

Corporation Park
Party	Candidate	Votes	%	±%
Liberal Democrats	Ajaib Hussain	704	30.2	+3.7
Conservative	Jim Kenyon	609	26.1	−1.2
Labour	Arshid Mahmood	1009	43.2	+8.7
Majority		305	13.1	
Turnout		2334	47.87	
Labour hold		Swing	5.0	

=== Meadowhead ===
Two councillors to be elected.

Meadowhead
Party	Candidate	Votes	%	±%
Liberal Democrats	Ray Askew	247		
Conservative	Alan Howard Barry	761		
BNP	Nicholas Holt	457		
Labour	Ron O'Keeffe	642		
Conservative	Konrad Jan Tapp	661		
Labour	Elaine Wittingham	590		
Turnout		1857	42.69	
