= 2007 Burnley Borough Council election =

2007 UK local government election

Results of the 2007 Burnley Borough Council election

Elections to Burnley Borough Council in Lancashire, England were held on 3 May 2007. One third of the council was up for election and no party won overall control of the council. The winner of the Rosegrove with Lowerhouse ward had to be drawn by lot after the Labour and BNP candidates received an identical number of votes. Sam Holgate, the incumbent in the Rosegrove with Lowerhouse ward joined the Lib Dems in September 2006, being previously elected as an Independent.

After the election, the composition of the council was:

- Liberal Democrat 18
- Labour 17
- Conservative 6
- British National Party 4

== Election result ==
Burnley local election result 2007
Party	Seats	Gains	Losses	Net gain/loss	Seats %	Votes %	Votes	+/−
Liberal Democrats	7	3	2	+1	46.7	34.2	8,359	-2.7
Labour	5	2	1	+1	33.3	27.3	6,706	-4.0
Conservative	2	1	0	+1	13.3	15.4	3,779	-1.4
BNP	1	0	3	-3	6.7	17.5	4,286	+4.2
England First	0	0	0	0	0.0	3.1	770	+3.1
Green	0	0	0	0	0.0	0.3	84	+0.3
Independent	0	0	0	0	0.0	2.2	546	+0.5

== Ward results ==
Bank Hall
Party	Candidate	Votes	%	±%
Labour	Imtiaz Hussain	699	46.9	−3.1
Liberal Democrats	Justin Birtwistle	608	40.8	−1.9
Conservative	Paul Coates	184	12.3	+4.6
Majority		91	6.1	
Turnout		1,491	35.9	
Labour gain from Liberal Democrats		Swing		

Briercliffe
Party	Candidate	Votes	%	±%
Liberal Democrats	Anne Kelly	1,074	58.7	−9.7
BNP	Patricia Thomson	515	28.1	+28.1
Labour	Brian Fenn	185	10.1	−1.5
Conservative	Peter Raistrick	115	6.3	−13.2
Majority		559	30.5	−18.4
Turnout		1,834	39.8	
Liberal Democrats gain from BNP		Swing		

Brunshaw
Party	Candidate	Votes	%	±%
Liberal Democrats	John Jones	680	38.1	+4.7
Labour	Karen Baker	499	28.0	−9.7
BNP	Paul McDevitt	467	26.2	+7.6
Conservative	Tony Coulson	139	7.7	−2.6
Majority		181	10.1	
Turnout		1,785	35.8	
Liberal Democrats hold		Swing		

Cliviger with Worsthorne
Party	Candidate	Votes	%	±%
Conservative	Cosima Towneley	840	38.0	−19.6
England First	Steven Smith	372	16.8	+16.8
BNP	David Shapcott	260	11.8	+11.8
Labour	Brenda Lambert	225	10.2	−6.6
Independent	Paula Riley	216	9.8	+9.8
Liberal Democrats	Michael McHugh	213	9.6	−16.0
Green	Richard Wyatt	84	3.8	+3.8
Majority		468	21.2	−10.9
Turnout		2,210	50.2	
Conservative gain from BNP		Swing		

Coalclough with Deerplay
Party	Candidate	Votes	%	±%
Liberal Democrats	Maureen McCaffrey	1,055	79.9	−3.1
Labour	Angela Donovan	265	20.1	+3.1
Majority		790	59.8	−7.6
Turnout		1,320	33.1	
Liberal Democrats hold		Swing		

Daneshouse with Stoneyholme
Party	Candidate	Votes	%	±%
Labour	Wajid Khan	1,405	60.0	+9.7
Liberal Democrats	Qurban Ali	935	40.0	−9.7
Majority		470	20.0	+19.3
Turnout		2,340	59.1	
Labour hold		Swing		

Gannow
Party	Candidate	Votes	%	±%
Liberal Democrats	Charlie Briggs	560	33.0	+6.4
BNP	Carol Hughes	484	28.5	−3.2
Labour	Peter Kenyon	446	26.3	−1.1
Conservative	Sharon Everitt	209	12.2	−2.2
Majority		76	4.5	
Turnout		1,699	39.0	
Liberal Democrats gain from BNP		Swing		

Gawthorpe
Party	Candidate	Votes	%	±%
Labour	John Harbour	854	53.1	+20.0
BNP	Scott Atkinson	405	25.2	−6.2
Conservative	Barry Robinson	201	12.5	−5.7
Liberal Democrats	Denise Embra	149	9.2	−8.1
Majority		449	27.9	+25.9
Turnout		1,609	34.8	
Labour hold		Swing		

Hapton with Park
Party	Candidate	Votes	%	±%
BNP	Len Starr	674	37.7	+3.3
Labour	Jean Cunningham	544	30.4	−1.6
Liberal Democrats	William Brindle	299	16.7	−1.2
Conservative	Alan Marsden	271	15.1	−0.6
Majority		130	7.3	+4.9
Turnout		1,788	37.5	
BNP hold		Swing		

Lanehead
Party	Candidate	Votes	%	±%
Liberal Democrats	Martin Smith	693	42.6	+0.8
Labour	Peter Marland	398	24.5	+3.5
Independent	Anne Royle	330	20.3	+6.3
Conservative	Michael Raistrick	204	12.6	+1.8
Majority		295	18.2	+3.0
Turnout		1,625	36.0	
Liberal Democrats hold		Swing		

Queensgate
Party	Candidate	Votes	%	±%
Liberal Democrats	Arif Khan	489	31.5	−21.5
Labour	Laurence Embley	432	27.8	−6.6
England First	Simon Bennett	398	25.6	+25.6
Conservative	Arthur Coats	233	15.1	+2.5
Majority		57	3.7	−14.9
Turnout		1,552	36.9	
Liberal Democrats hold		Swing		

Rosegrove with Lowerhouse
Party	Candidate	Votes	%	±%
Labour	Paul Reynolds	489	30.7	+0.8
BNP	John Rowe	489	30.7	+0.4
Liberal Democrats	Sam Holgate	452	28.3	−4.9
Conservative	Ian Pool	164	10.3	+3.7
Majority		0	0.0	
Turnout		1,594	33.7	
Labour gain from Liberal Democrats		Swing		

Rosehill with Burnley Wood
Party	Candidate	Votes	%	±%
Liberal Democrats	Francis Ashworth	564	35.5	−14.7
Labour	Janice Swainston	462	29.0	+0.2
BNP	Elaine Kirby	300	18.9	+18.9
Conservative	David Tierney	264	16.6	−4.4
Majority		102	6.4	−15.0
Turnout		1,590	35.9	
Liberal Democrats gain from Labour		Swing		

Trinity
Party	Candidate	Votes	%	±%
Labour	Elizabeth Monk	514	39.8	+5.8
BNP	John Cave	369	28.6	−3.9
Liberal Democrats	Martyn Hurt	311	24.1	+3.0
Conservative	Thomas Picton	96	7.5	−4.9
Majority		145	11.2	+9.8
Turnout		1,290	32.7	
Labour hold		Swing		

Whittlefield with Ightenhill
Party	Candidate	Votes	%	±%
Conservative	Ida Carmichael	1,060	53.5	+10.4
BNP	Joan Shapcott	323	16.3	−6.8
Labour	Alex Mclachlan	322	16.2	−0.3
Liberal Democrats	Bernie Kyriacou	277	14.0	−3.4
Majority		737	37.2	+20.6
Turnout		1,982	40.9	
Conservative hold		Swing		
