= 2022 Blackburn with Darwen Borough Council election =

- 5 May 2022

18 of 51 seats to Blackburn with Darwen Borough Council 26 seats needed for a majority

	First party	Second party
Leader	Phil Riley	John Slater
Party	Labour	Conservative
Last election	36 seats	13 seats
Seats before	36	13
Seats won	14	4
Seats after	36	13
Seat change	0	0
Popular vote	20,109	10,792
Percentage	60.3%	32.4%
- Winner of each seat at 2022 Blackburn with Darwen Borough Council election
Leader before election
Mohammed Khan
Labour
Leader after election
Phil Riley
Labour

The 2022 Blackburn with Darwen Borough Council election took place on 5 May 2022 to elect members of Blackburn with Darwen Borough Council in England. This was on the same day as other local elections. One-third of the seats were up for election.

== Results summary ==
2022 Blackburn with Darwen Borough Council election
Party	This election			Full council			This election		
Party	Seats	Net	Seats %	Other	Total	Total %	Votes	Votes %	+/−
Labour	14	Steady	77.8	22	36	70.6	20,109	60.3	+4.9
Conservative	4	Steady	22.2	9	13	25.5	10,792	32.4	-6.4
Independent	0	Steady	0.0	1	1	2.0	1,351	4.1	+3.3
Liberal Democrats	0	Steady	0.0	1	1	2.0	1,084	3.3	-1.7

== Ward results ==
=== Audley & Queen's Park ===
Audley & Queen's Park
Party	Candidate	Votes	%	±%
Labour	Ehsan Raja	811	39.5	−8.0
Independent	Yusuf Jan-Virmani	642	31.2	N/A
Independent	Mohammed Patel	340	16.5	N/A
Conservative	Hifzur Lorgat	262	12.7	−39.8
Majority		169	8.3	
Turnout		2,076	33.0	
Labour hold		Swing	N/A	

=== Bastwell & Daisyfield ===
Bastwell & Daisyfield
Party	Candidate	Votes	%	±%
Labour	Parwaiz Akhtar	1,713	76.4	−8.5
Conservative	Fajila Patel	529	23.6	+8.5
Majority		1,184	52.8	
Turnout		2,246	37.8	
Labour hold		Swing	▼8.5	

=== Billinge & Beardwood ===
Billinge & Beardwood
Party	Candidate	Votes	%	±%
Labour	Tasleem Fazal	1,451	64.7	+9.6
Conservative	Rizwan Shah	620	27.7	−13.3
Independent	Tahir Mahmood	170	7.6	N/A
Majority		831	37.0	
Turnout		2,263	37.2	
Labour hold		Swing	▲11.5	

=== Blackburn Central ===
Blackburn Central
Party	Candidate	Votes	%	±%
Labour	Zamir Khan	1,093	67.5	−7.6
Conservative	Ghulam Sabir	328	20.2	−4.7
Independent	Ismail Patel	115	7.1	N/A
Independent	Siama Bhatti	84	5.2	N/A
Majority		765	47.3	
Turnout		1,627	26.0	
Labour hold		Swing	▼1.5	

=== Blackburn South & Lower Darwen ===
Blackburn South & Lower Darwen
Party	Candidate	Votes	%	±%
Conservative	Jacqueline Slater	878	60.0	−10.1
Labour	Liz Johnson	586	40.0	+10.1
Majority		292	20.0	
Turnout		1,475	25.7	
Conservative hold		Swing	▼10.1	

=== Blackburn South East ===
Blackburn South East
Party	Candidate	Votes	%	±%
Labour	Jim Shorrock	820	73.1	+14.1
Conservative	Keith Murray	302	26.9	−5.2
Majority		518	46.2	
Turnout		1,130	18.6	
Labour hold		Swing	▲9.7	

=== Darwen East ===
Darwen East
Party	Candidate	Votes	%	±%
Labour	Martin McCaughran	902	54.5	+16.3
Liberal Democrats	Mark Davies	446	26.9	−8.8
Conservative	Ryan Slater	307	18.5	±0.0
Majority		456	27.6	
Turnout		1,668	25.6	
Labour hold		Swing	▲12.6	

=== Darwen South ===
Darwen South
Party	Candidate	Votes	%	±%
Conservative	Kevin Connor	880	46.1	−7.9
Labour	Matthew Jackson	731	38.3	+11.8
Liberal Democrats	John East	299	15.7	−3.8
Majority		149	7.8	
Turnout		1,918	30.3	
Conservative hold		Swing	▼9.9	

=== Darwen West ===
Darwen West
Party	Candidate	Votes	%	±%
Labour	David Smith	1,411	65.7	+8.7
Conservative	Janine Crook	660	30.7	−7.7
Liberal Democrats	Connor Plumley	77	3.6	−1.0
Majority		751	35.0	
Turnout		2,171	34.7	
Labour hold		Swing	▲8.2	

=== Ewood ===
Ewood
Party	Candidate	Votes	%	±%
Labour	Elaine Whittingham	860	60.4	+11.5
Conservative	Les Cade	564	39.6	−11.5
Majority		296	20.8	
Turnout		1,439	23.3	
Labour hold		Swing	▲11.5	

=== Little Harwood & Whitebirk ===
Little Harwood & Whitebirk
Party	Candidate	Votes	%	±%
Labour	Sonia Khan	1,357	71.2	−1.6
Conservative	Mohmmed Kapadia	549	28.8	+1.6
Majority		808	42.4	
Turnout		1,928	32.0	
Labour hold		Swing	▼1.6	

=== Livesey with Pleasington ===
Livesey with Pleasington
Party	Candidate	Votes	%	±%
Conservative	Derek Hardman	1,355	66.0	−7.4
Labour	Michael Jackson	698	34.0	+7.4
Majority		657	32.0	
Turnout		2,081	32.6	
Conservative hold		Swing	▼7.4	

=== Mill Hill & Moorgate ===
Mill Hill & Moorgate
Party	Candidate	Votes	%	±%
Labour	Jim Smith	801	62.5	+8.3
Conservative	Rick Moore	481	37.5	−8.3
Majority		320	25.0	
Turnout		1,294	23.1	
Labour hold		Swing	▲8.3	

=== Roe Lee ===
Roe Lee (2 seats due to by-election)
Party	Candidate	Votes	%	±%
Labour	Saj Ali	1,312	67.8	+8.8
Labour	Phil Riley	1,217	62.9	+3.9
Conservative	Henry Arnold	680	35.1	−5.9
Conservative	Helen Voegt	663	34.2	−6.8
Turnout			33.3	
Labour hold		Swing		
Labour hold		Swing		

Roe Lee elected two councillors at this election: the ward's ordinary seat, and a second seat filled at a poll held on the same day to fill the vacancy caused by the resignation of the sitting Labour councillor, Ron Whittle. Saj Ali was elected to the ordinary seat, succeeding fellow Labour councillor Phil Riley, who was in turn elected to the seat vacated by Whittle's resignation.

=== Shear Brow & Corporation Park ===
Shear Brow & Corporation Park
Party	Candidate	Votes	%	±%
Labour	Suleman Khonat	1,875	90.9	−0.2
Conservative	Carolyn Marrow	188	9.1	+0.2
Majority		1,687	81.8	
Turnout		2,072	33.6	
Labour hold		Swing	▼0.2	

=== Wensley Fold ===
Wensley Fold
Party	Candidate	Votes	%	±%
Labour	Sabahat Imtiaz	1,697	89.0	+1.2
Conservative	Aaliyah Alli	210	11.0	−1.2
Majority		1,487	78.0	
Turnout		1,921	31.9	
Labour hold		Swing	▲1.2	

=== West Pennine ===
West Pennine
Party	Candidate	Votes	%	±%
Conservative	Julie Slater	1,336	56.3	−3.7
Labour	Jude Rowley	774	32.6	+10.0
Liberal Democrats	Bernard Johnson	262	11.0	−6.4
Majority		562	23.7	
Turnout		2,388	38.8	
Conservative hold		Swing	▼6.9	

== Aftermath ==
Council leader Mohammed Khan CBE, a councillor since 1992 and Leader since 2015, did not seek re-election and retired from the council at this election. Phil Riley, the outgoing deputy leader, was confirmed as the new Leader of the Council at the annual council meeting on 19 May 2022.

== Changes 2022–2023 ==
=== By-elections ===
==== Darwen South ====
Darwen South: 17 November 2022
Party	Candidate	Votes	%	±%
Labour	Matt Jackson	569	44.9	+6.6
Conservative	Janine Crook	562	44.3	–1.8
Liberal Democrats	Mark Davies	137	10.8	–4.9
Majority		7	0.6	N/A
Turnout		1,271	19.9	–10.4
Labour gain from Conservative		Swing	▲4.2	

Andrew Walker, who by the time of his disqualification was sitting as an independent councillor having left the Conservative Party, was automatically disqualified in October 2022 under section 85 of the Local Government Act 1972 for failing to attend a council meeting for six consecutive months.
