= 2011 Blackburn with Darwen Borough Council election =

Local election in Lancashire, UK

Results of the 2011 Blackburn with Darwen Borough Council election

2011 Elections to Blackburn with Darwen Borough Council were held on 5 May 2011, alongside other local elections across the United Kingdom. 21 seats (one third) of the council were up for election. Following the election the council remained under Labour control.

== Results summary ==
Results
Party	Seats before	Change	Seats after
Labour	32	▲5	37
Conservative Party	19	▼2	17
Liberal Democrats	8	▼2	6
Others	5	▼1	4

== See also ==
- Blackburn with Darwen Borough Council elections
