= 2015 Blackburn with Darwen Borough Council election =

2015 UK local government election

- 7 May 2015

21 council seats
	First party	Second party	Third party
Leader		Mike Lee
Party	Labour	Conservative	Liberal Democrats
Leader since		2009
Seats won	15	6	2
Swing	▲%	▼%	▼%
Council control before election
Labour Party (UK)
Council control after election
Labour Party (UK)

Results of the 2015 Blackburn with Darwen Borough Council election

The 2015 Blackburn with Darwen Borough Council election took place on 7 May 2015 to elect members of Blackburn with Darwen Borough Council in England. This was on the same day as other local elections.
