= 2026 Blackburn with Darwen Borough Council election =

2026 English local government election

- 7 May 2026

17 out of 51 seats to Blackburn with Darwen Borough Council 26 seats needed for a majority
| | First party | Second party |
|---|---|---|
| Leader | Phil Riley |
| Party | Labour | Independent |
| Last election | 29 seats, 40.4% | 13 seats, 34.7% |
| Seats before | 27 | 15 (Note: Of the 15 Independent councillors before the election, 13 sat in the 4 BwD group and 2 were non-aligned.) |
| Seats won | 2 | 6 |
| Seats after | 20 | 17 (Note: Of the 17 Independent councillors after the election, 10 sat in the 4 BwD group and 7 were non-aligned, according to the council's own published results; the split between the two is described there as "subject to Regulation 8 confirmation of political groups".) |
| Seat change | ▼7 | ▲2 |
| Popular vote | 10,018 | 10,389 |
| Percentage | 23.3% | 24.2% |
| Swing | ▼17.1 | ▼10.5 |
| | Third party | Fourth party |
| Leader | | John Slater |
| Party | Reform | Conservative |
| Last election | did not stand | 9 seats, 22.5% |
| Seats before | 0 | 9 |
| Seats won | 9 | 0 |
| Seats after | 9 | 5 |
| Seat change | ▲9 | ▼4 |
| Popular vote | 12,699 | 4,663 |
| Percentage | 29.6% | 10.9% |
| Swing | | ▼11.6 |
- Results by Ward
Leader before election
Phil Riley
Labour
Leader after election
Phil Riley
Labour
No overall control

The 2026 Blackburn with Darwen Borough Council election took place on 7 May 2026 to elect members of Blackburn with Darwen Borough Council in Lancashire, England. This was on the same day as other local elections.

Prior to the election, the council was under Labour majority control. At the election, the council went under no overall control. Labour remained the largest party, but fell six seats short of a majority. They managed to form a minority administration, and the incumbent Labour leader of the council, Phil Riley, was reappointed to the role at the subsequent annual council meeting on 21 May 2026.

== Summary ==
=== Election result ===
2026 Blackburn with Darwen Borough Council election
| Party | This election | | | | Full council | | | This election | | |
| Party | Candidates | Seats | Net | Seats % | Other | Total | Total % | Votes | Votes % | +/− |
|---|---|---|---|---|---|---|---|---|---|---|
| Labour | 14 | 2 | ▼7 | 11.8 | 18 | 20 | 39.2 | 10,018 | 23.3 | -17.1 |
| Independent | 16 | 6 | ▲2 | 35.3 | 11 | 17 | 33.3 | 10,389 | 24.2 | -10.5 |
| Conservative | 17 | 0 | ▼4 | 0.0 | 5 | 5 | 9.8 | 4,663 | 10.9 | -11.6 |
| Reform | 17 | 9 | ▲9 | 52.9 | 0 | 9 | 17.6 | 12,699 | 29.6 | N/A |
| Green | 17 | 0 | Steady | 0.0 | 0 | 0 | 0.0 | 4,992 | 11.6 | +9.2 |
| Liberal Democrats | 2 | 0 | Steady | 0.0 | 0 | 0 | 0.0 | 126 | 0.3 | N/A |
| Workers Party | 1 | 0 | Steady | 0.0 | 0 | 0 | 0.0 | 73 | 0.2 | N/A |

== Incumbents ==
| Ward | Incumbent councillor | Party | Re-standing |
|---|---|---|---|
| Audley & Queen's Park | Ehsan Raja | Labour | Yes |
| Bastwell & Daisyfield | Parwaiz Akhtar | Labour | Yes |
| Billinge & Beardwood | Tasleem Fazal (Note: Originally elected as Labour, but left the party to sit as an independent.) | Independent | Yes |
| Blackburn Central | Zamir Khan | Labour | Yes |
| Blackburn South & Lower Darwen | Jacqueline Slater | Conservative | Yes |
| Blackburn South East | Jim Shorrock | Labour | Yes |
| Darwen East | Martin McCaughran | Labour | Yes |
| Darwen South | Kevin Connor | Conservative | Yes |
| Darwen West | David Smith | Labour | Yes |
| Ewood | Elaine Whittingham (Note: Originally elected as Labour, but left the party to sit as an independent.) | Independent | Yes |
| Little Harwood & Whitebirk | Sonia Khan | Labour | No |
| Livesey with Pleasington | Derek Hardman (Note: Was deselected as a Conservative candidate and stood as an independent.) | Conservative | Yes |
| Mill Hill & Moorgate | Jim Smith | Labour | No |
| Roe Lee | Saj Ali (Note: Originally elected as Labour, but left the party to sit as an independent.) | Independent | Yes |
| Shear Brow & Corporation Park | Suleman Khonat | Independent | Yes |
| Wensley Fold | Sabahat Imtiaz | Labour | No |
| West Pennine | Julie Slater | Conservative | Yes |

== Candidates ==
=== Audley & Queen's Park ===
Audley & Queen's Park
| Party | Candidate | Votes | % | ±% |
|---|---|---|---|---|
| Independent | Aadil Chopdat | 886 | 38.3 | N/A |
| Independent | Yusuf Jan-Virmani | 489 | 21.1 | N/A |
| Labour | Ehsan Raja* | 427 | 18.4 | −21.1 |
| Reform | Catherine Richards | 177 | 7.6 | N/A |
| Green | Michael Nickson | 173 | 7.5 | N/A |
| Independent | Zain Ghulam | 104 | 4.5 | N/A |
| Conservative | Tristan Marrow | 46 | 2.0 | −10.7 |
| Majority | | 397 | 17.1 | +8.8 |
| Turnout | | 2315 | 35 | +2.0 |
| Independent gain from Labour | | Swing | | |

=== Bastwell & Daisyfield ===
Bastwell & Daisyfield
| Party | Candidate | Votes | % | ±% |
|---|---|---|---|---|
| Independent | Shakeel Choudhry | 1,332 | 46.5 | N/A |
| Labour | Parwaiz Akhtar* | 1127 | 39.4 | −37.0 |
| Green | Matthew Khan-Dyer | 149 | 5.2 | N/A |
| Independent | Fajila Patel | 133 | 4.6 | N/A |
| Reform | Maurice Robinson | 97 | 3.4 | N/A |
| Conservative | Reece MacAulay | 17 | 0.6 | −23.0 |
| Majority | | 206 | 7.2 | −45.6 |
| Turnout | | 2864 | 47.2 | +9.4 |
| Independent gain from Labour | | Swing | | |

=== Billinge & Beardwood ===
Billinge & Beardwood
| Party | Candidate | Votes | % | ±% |
|---|---|---|---|---|
| Independent | Tasleem Fazal* | 1,173 | 41.6 | N/A |
| Labour | Shabbir Dudhara | 470 | 16.7 | −48.0 |
| Conservative | Imtiaz Ali | 397 | 14.1 | −13.6 |
| Green | Aimee Dewse | 395 | 14.0 | N/A |
| Reform | Danny Wilson | 365 | 13.0 | N/A |
| Majority | | 703 | 24.9 | −12.3 |
| Turnout | | 2818 | 42.9 | +5.7 |
| Independent gain from Labour | | Swing | | |

=== Blackburn Central ===
Blackburn Central
| Party | Candidate | Votes | % | ±% |
|---|---|---|---|---|
| Labour | Zamir Khan* | 865 | 40.9 | −26.6 |
| Independent | Aliraza Tariq | 586 | 27.7 | N/A |
| Reform | Isaac Cowans | 359 | 17.0 | N/A |
| Green | Saul Whittle | 186 | 8.8 | N/A |
| Liberal Democrats | Simon Huggill | 55 | 2.6 | N/A |
| Conservative | Keith Murray | 54 | 2.6 | −17.6 |
| Majority | | 279 | 13.2 | −34.1 |
| Turnout | | 2114 | 32.7 | +6.7 |
| Labour hold | | Swing | | |

=== Blackburn South & Lower Darwen ===
Blackburn South & Lower Darwen
| Party | Candidate | Votes | % | ±% |
|---|---|---|---|---|
| Reform | Daniel Matchett | 1,313 | 55.6 | N/A |
| Conservative | Jacquie Slater* | 531 | 22.5 | −37.5 |
| Green | Hazel Walsh | 499 | 21.1 | N/A |
| Majority | | 782 | 33.1 | +13.1 |
| Turnout | | 2360 | 39.9 | +14.2 |
| Reform gain from Conservative | | Swing | | |

=== Blackburn South East ===
Blackburn South East
| Party | Candidate | Votes | % | ±% |
|---|---|---|---|---|
| Reform | Andy Mahon | 840 | 46.5 | N/A |
| Labour | Jim Shorrock* | 487 | 27.0 | −46.1 |
| Green | Ahmed Abdelrahman | 346 | 19.2 | N/A |
| Conservative | Henry Arnold | 130 | 7.2 | −19.7 |
| Majority | | 373 | 20.7 | −25.5 |
| Turnout | | 1806 | 27.8 | +9.2 |
| Reform gain from Labour | | Swing | | |

=== Darwen East ===
Darwen East
| Party | Candidate | Votes | % | ±% |
|---|---|---|---|---|
| Reform | Christine Dawson | 919 | 45.0 | N/A |
| Labour | Martin McCaughran* | 568 | 27.8 | −26.7 |
| Green | Yasmin Connell | 362 | 17.7 | N/A |
| Conservative | Ryan Slater | 184 | 9.0 | −9.5 |
| Majority | | 351 | 17.2 | −10.4 |
| Turnout | | 2043 | 30.5 | +4.9 |
| Reform gain from Labour | | Swing | | |

=== Darwen South ===
Darwen South
| Party | Candidate | Votes | % | ±% |
|---|---|---|---|---|
| Reform | Bradley Langford | 1,405 | 50.9 | N/A |
| Labour | Sue Skipper | 573 | 20.8 | −17.5 |
| Conservative | Kevin Connor* | 471 | 17.1 | −29.0 |
| Green | Denise Morgan | 306 | 11.1 | N/A |
| Majority | | 832 | 30.2 | +22.4 |
| Turnout | | 2758 | 40.8 | +10.5 |
| Reform gain from Conservative | | Swing | | |

=== Darwen West ===
Darwen West
| Party | Candidate | Votes | % | ±% |
|---|---|---|---|---|
| Reform | Janine Crook | 1,136 | 42.9 | N/A |
| Labour Co-op | David Smith* | 986 | 37.2 | −28.5 |
| Green | Eleanor Hill | 233 | 8.8 | N/A |
| Conservative | Steve Duncan | 207 | 7.8 | −22.9 |
| Liberal Democrats | Ian Thomas | 71 | 2.7 | −0.9 |
| Majority | | 150 | 5.7 | −29.3 |
| Turnout | | 2650 | 43.1 | +8.4 |
| Reform gain from Labour | | Swing | | |

=== Ewood ===
Ewood
| Party | Candidate | Votes | % | ±% |
|---|---|---|---|---|
| Reform | John Clayton | 1,034 | 50.8 | N/A |
| Independent | Elaine Whittingham* | 391 | 19.2 | N/A |
| Green | Willem Evans | 351 | 17.2 | N/A |
| Conservative | Les Cade | 245 | 12.0 | −27.6 |
| Majority | | 643 | 31.6 | +10.8 |
| Turnout | | 2037 | 32.2 | +8.9 |
| Reform gain from Labour | | Swing | | |

=== Little Harwood & Whitebirk ===
Little Harwood & Whitebirk
| Party | Candidate | Votes | % | ±% |
|---|---|---|---|---|
| Independent | Haroon Khan | 1,203 | 48.4 | N/A |
| Labour | Salim Lorgat | 627 | 25.2 | −46.0 |
| Reform | John Black (Note: Was expelled from Reform UK following his past membership of the British National Party) | 283 | 11.4 | N/A |
| Green | James Schofield | 269 | 10.8 | N/A |
| Conservative | Emma MacAulay | 98 | 3.9 | −24.9 |
| Majority | | 576 | 23.2 | −19.2 |
| Turnout | | 2487 | 39.7 | +7.7 |
| Independent gain from Labour | | Swing | | |

=== Livesey with Pleasington ===
Livesey with Pleasington
| Party | Candidate | Votes | % | ±% |
|---|---|---|---|---|
| Reform | Helen Voegt | 1,448 | 43.2 | N/A |
| Conservative | Rick Moore | 823 | 24.5 | −41.5 |
| Independent | Derek Hardman* | 427 | 12.7 | N/A |
| Labour | Oscar Marshall | 325 | 9.7 | −24.3 |
| Green | Paul Florentine | 323 | 9.6 | N/A |
| Majority | | 625 | 18.6 | −13.4 |
| Turnout | | 3353 | 46.4 | +8.1 |
| Reform gain from Conservative | | Swing | | |

=== Mill Hill & Moorgate ===
Mill Hill & Moorgate
| Party | Candidate | Votes | % | ±% |
|---|---|---|---|---|
| Reform | Stephen Hartley | 1,047 | 53.5 | N/A |
| Labour | Donna Talbot | 465 | 23.7 | −38.8 |
| Green | Charlotte Bradley | 277 | 14.1 | N/A |
| Conservative | Tillie Delaney | 162 | 8.3 | −29.2 |
| Majority | | 582 | 29.7 | +6.8 |
| Turnout | | 1958 | 34.2 | +11.1 |
| Reform gain from Labour | | Swing | | |

=== Roe Lee ===
Roe Lee
| Party | Candidate | Votes | % | ±% |
|---|---|---|---|---|
| Independent | Sajid Ali* | 1,119 | 42.1 | N/A |
| Reform | Tommy Temperley | 676 | 25.5 | N/A |
| Green | Hassan Ul-Haq | 436 | 16.4 | N/A |
| Conservative | Sarah Morrison | 282 | 10.6 | −24.1 |
| Workers Party | Mudassir Shaheen | 73 | 2.7 | N/A |
| Independent | Liyakat Sidat | 52 | 2.0 | N/A |
| Majority | | 443 | 16.7 | −13.9 |
| Turnout | | 2655 | 39.6 | +6.3 |
| Independent gain from Labour | | Swing | | |

=== Shear Brow & Corporation Park ===
Shear Brow & Corporation Park
| Party | Candidate | Votes | % | ±% |
|---|---|---|---|---|
| Labour | Hussain Akhtar | 1,440 | 47.8 | −43.1 |
| Independent | Suleman Khonat* | 1345 | 44.6 | N/A |
| Green | Alex Wareing | 128 | 4.2 | N/A |
| Reform | Christopher Powell | 74 | 2.5 | N/A |
| Conservative | Adrian Hoole | 20 | 0.7 | −8.4 |
| Majority | | 95 | 3.2 | −78.6 |
| Turnout | | 3015 | 47.6 | +14.0 |
| Labour hold | | Swing | | |

=== Wensley Fold ===
Wensley Fold
| Party | Candidate | Votes | % | ±% |
|---|---|---|---|---|
| Independent | Mohmed Patel | 1,100 | 41.2 | N/A |
| Labour | Tahyub Naser | 962 | 36.0 | −53.0 |
| Reform | Jordan Sands | 262 | 9.8 | N/A |
| Green | Jane Wareing | 228 | 8.5 | N/A |
| Conservative | Carolyn Marrow | 57 | 2.1 | −8.9 |
| Independent | Altaf Patel | 39 | 1.5 | N/A |
| Independent | Safvan Patel | 10 | 0.4 | N/A |
| Majority | | 138 | 5.2 | −72.8 |
| Turnout | | 2669 | 42.4 | +10.5 |
| Independent gain from Labour | | Swing | | |

=== West Pennine ===
West Pennine
| Party | Candidate | Votes | % | ±% |
|---|---|---|---|---|
| Reform | Angela Crane | 1,264 | 38.9 | N/A |
| Conservative | Julie Slater* | 939 | 28.9 | −27.4 |
| Labour | Jude Rowley | 696 | 21.4 | −11.2 |
| Green | Simon Charlesworth | 331 | 10.2 | N/A |
| Majority | | 325 | 10.0 | −13.7 |
| Turnout | | 3251 | 51.8 | +13.0 |
| Reform gain from Conservative | | Swing | | |
