= American Friends of the British National Party =

US-based BNP political activist group

American Friends of the British National Party (sometimes abbreviated as AFBNP) was a political activist group founded by British far-right expatriate Mark Cotterill in January 1999 that facilitated financial assistance for the British National Party (BNP) from American supporters. It also fostered links between far-right groups and individuals in the United States and the United Kingdom. According to BNP Chairman Nick Griffin, the group made a "significant contribution to the BNP's [2001] general election campaign".

== History and activities ==
It operated from a small apartment in Falls Church, Virginia for much of its history. Griffin and party figure Richard Barnbrook attended meetings to give support and to connect with American far-right activists. In an April 2000 seminar in Texas, Griffin met with David Duke, Samuel T. Francis, Kirk Lyons, chairman of Southern Legal Resource Center and Roy Armstrong, a member of the National Democratic Party of Germany. He gave a speech in which he said:

The BNP isn't about selling out its ideas, which are your ideas too, but we are determined to sell them. Basically, that means to use saleable words – such as freedom, identity, security, democracy. [...]

Once we're in a position where we control the British broadcasting media, then perhaps one day the British people might change their mind and say, 'yes, every last one must go'. But if you hold that out as your sole aim to start with, you're not going to get anywhere. So, instead of talking about racial purity, we talk about identity. [...]

There's a difference between selling out your ideas and selling your ideas, and the British National Party isn't about selling out its ideas, which are your ideas too, but we are determined now to sell them, and that means basically to use the saleable words, as I say, freedom, security, identity, democracy. Nobody can criticise them. Nobody can come at you and attack you on those ideas. They are saleable.

He met with white nationalist Don Black in another meeting.

Issues advocated by the AFBNP included opposition to the NATO's intervention in the former Yugoslavia and the importance of "pan-Aryan" internationalism. Members of far right movements such as the Christian Identity, the Council of Conservative Citizens, American neo-Nazism, and various neo-confederate groups participated in their meetings. The AFBNP also published a bimonthly magazine called Heritage and Destiny. In fall 2000, it attempted to gain influence within state chapters of the American Reform Party, but it was unsuccessful.

On November 7, 2002, the Immigration and Naturalization Service prevented Cotterill from re-entering the country, saying that he lied about his initial reasons for coming in 1999 and summarily violated the Foreign Agents Registration Act. Cotterill stated that he would modify the organization into the "Overseas Friends of the British National Party". However, the group has since essentially folded.

White supremacist and anti-Semite James W. von Brunn was a member of the AFBNP in its short history, and he said that he met Nick Griffin twice through its connections. Brunn committed the United States Holocaust Memorial Museum shooting, in which museum guard Stephen Tyrone Johns was murdered. A BNP spokesperson later said that the party had "never heard of" Brunn.

== See also ==
- Umbrella organization
- Organizations affiliated with the British National Party
