= For Darwen Party =

- Leader: Stephen Potter
- Founders: Tony Melia; Michael Johnson
- Founded: March 2007
- Dissolved: 5 November 2013, announced 2014
- Headquarters: Duckworth Street, Darwen
- Ideology: Localism; Hard Euroscepticism
- Colours: Cyan

Website
- fordarwen.org.uk (archived)

The For Darwen Party was a local political party in Darwen, south of Blackburn, England, with a platform that Darweners were not properly represented on Blackburn with Darwen Borough Council.

Founded in 2007, the party had three Borough Councillors following the May elections and five in 2008. Councillors included former members of the Liberal Democrats, England First Party and the BNP. They formed a coalition administration with the Liberal Democrats and Conservatives from 2007 to 2010, and successfully campaigned for the creation of Darwen Town Council in 2009, on which they won seven seats.

In 2010 they suffered three defections and Labour regained control of the borough council. By 2012 For Darwen had lost all their seats and the party folded in 2014, most of the remaining membership joining UKIP.

== History ==
The party was cofounded in March 2007 by businessman Tony Melia, and Michael Johnson who was the elected councillor for Lower Darwen and Fernhurst Tony Melia had previously stood as a Liberal Democrat candidate against Jack Straw in the 2005 general election in Blackburn. He said he quit the Liberal Democrats to form For Darwen as he was tired of what the Labour-controlled council was doing, particularly with the Darwen Academy, leisure centre, and regeneration. Melia was joined by Michael Johnson, who had been elected in May 2006 as a councillor for the far-right England First Party but publicly left the party at the full council meeting after disagreeing with a racist Christmas card on the party website. After the 2007 local elections, For Darwen had three councillors and formed a ruling coalition with the Conservatives and Liberal Democrats. Melia was re-elected and Trevor Maxfield, a former BNP organiser, was also elected.

Cllr Johnson left For Darwen in March 2008 over "Back stabbing and lies made by some party members stating he had been banned from pubs in Darwen and other matters which could not be substantiated and were proven to be completely untrue. This and other policy differences with certain unelected party members was his reason for leaving"; he stayed a member of the coalition, but this reduced the number of seats For Darwen held in the coalition. In June 2008, Melia was criticised for going on a council-funded twin town trip to Altena, Germany, despite a campaign pledge, "There will be no more trips abroad for councillors paid for by us, the council taxpayers".

The party led the successful campaign for the formation of Darwen Town Council and gained seven seats - half the seats - in June 2009. Liberal Democrat Paul Browne, also a Borough Councillor, became Town Mayor in July and For Darwen councillor Phil Jones became deputy leader.

The party stayed in coalition with the Liberal Democrats and Conservatives after the May 2010 borough council elections, with five councillors, arguing successfully for the town council not to be charged for use of Darwen Town Hall. Cllr Trevor Maxfield became executive member for leisure and culture in June. However, in opposition to coalition budget cuts, Cllrs Maxfield and Anthony Meleady became independents in August, returning Labour to a majority - Labour won a motion of no confidence in September and regained control of the council. Maxfield regained his seat in Earcroft in 2011 for Labour. Martin McCaughran, Sudell ward town councillor, joined the Liberal Democrats in June 2010. That October, deputy leader Phil Jones was criticised for living in nearby Rishton, rather than in Darwen.

Melia lost his seat on the borough council in May 2011. He relinquished the leadership of the party and stood down as a Town Councillor in March 2012 and was replaced by Cllr Stephen Potter. All For Darwen Town and Borough Councillors either stood down in 2012 or, after significant gains by the Labour Party, lost their seats.

After the party lost its last councillors in 2012, the leader Stephen Potter announced the end of For Darwen in June 2014. Potter joined UKIP and aimed for the remaining For Darwen members to form a Darwen branch of UKIP, which founder Melia said was not his choice.

== Electoral history ==
=== 2007 ===
For Darwen stood four candidates for the Borough Council: Tony Melia seeking re-election in Sunnyhurst, Trevor Maxfield in Earcroft, Phil Jones in Marsh House, and Anthony Meleady in Sudell. Melia and Maxfield were elected.

=== 2008 ===
Despite losing a councillor before the election, For Darwen stood seven candidates and gained a further three seats in the May 2008 Borough Council elections, two in the same wards (Earcroft, Sunnyhurst) as 2007. The third was in Marsh House.

=== 2010 ===
For Darwen stood six candidates for the Borough Council: Heather Ashurst, Joan Helliwell, Wilf Helliwell, Martin McCaughran, Nella Melia, Stephen Potter.

Tony Melia also stood in Rossendale and Darwen for the anti-immigration Impact Party, gaining 243 votes (0.5% of votes cast). He remained leader of For Darwen.

=== 2011 ===
For Darwen stood six candidates for the borough council, but none were elected. Melia was defeated by returning veteran Labour Councillor Dave Smith in Sunnyhurst by 700 votes; Melia came third.

=== 2012 ===
New leader Stephen Potter lost his seat in Earcroft in May 2012 to Labour's Stephanie Brookfield, coming joint second. David Jackson came second in Sudell.

== Councillors ==
Numbers following May elections.

=== Blackburn with Darwen Council ===
64 seats in total.

- 2007: 3. Tony Melia (defected from Liberal Democrats, re-elected as For Darwen); Michael Johnson (defected from England First); Trevor Maxfield elected. Michael Johnson left the party in March 2008.
- 2008: 5. Three gains: Andrew Graham, Phil Jones, Anthony Meleady
- 2009: 5.
- 2010: 5. Trevor Maxfield and Anthony Meleady left the party in August 2010.
- 2011: 2, following loss of Melia's seat.
- 2012: 0.

=== Darwen Town Council ===
Thirteen seats, founded in 2009.

- 2009 - 7. Joan Helliwell, Phil Jones, Trevor Maxfield, Martin McCaughran, Nella Melia, Tony Melia, Stephen Potter
- 2010. Martin McCaughran joined the Liberal Democrats in June.
- 2011. 4. Joan Helliwell, Nella Melia, Tony Melia, Steve Potter.
- 2012. 0.
