= 2018 Blackburn with Darwen Borough Council election =

2018 UK local government election

Blackburn with Darwen Borough Council Election, 2018
- 3 May 2018

All 51 council seats
- Turnout: %
	First party	Second party	Third party
Leader	Mohammed Khan	John Slater
Party	Labour	Conservative	Liberal Democrats
Leader since	2015	2016
Last election	58.2%	29.5%	5.3%
Seats won	37	13	1
Seat change	Boundary Changes	Boundary Changes	Boundary Changes
Popular vote	59,068	33.962	3,223
Percentage	59.52%	34.22%	3.25%
Swing	▲%	▼%	▼%
- Winner of each seat at 2018 Blackburn with Darwen Borough Council election
Council control before election
Labour Party (UK)
Council control after election
Labour Party (UK)

The 2018 Blackburn with Darwen Borough Council election took place on 3 May 2018 to elect members of Blackburn with Darwen Borough Council in England. This was the same day as other local elections.

== Election result ==
Blackburn with Darwen Borough Council local election result 2018
Party	Seats	Gains	Losses	Net gain/loss	Seats %	Votes %	Votes	+/−
Labour	37	0	0	0	72.55	59.52	59,068	+**.**%
Conservative	13	0	0	0	25.49	34.22	33,962	-*.*%
Liberal Democrats	1	0	0	0	1.96	3.25	3,223	-*.*%
Independent	0	0	0	0	0.00	0.97	960	+*.*%
UKIP	0	0	0	0	0.00	0.85	840	+*.*%
Green	0	0	0	0	0.00	0.72	719	+*.*%
Spoilt Ballots	0	0	0	0	0.00	0.48	472	+*.*%
Total	51							

== Council Composition ==
Prior to the election the composition of the council was:

↓
44	16	3	1
Labour	Conservative	LD	I

LD - Liberal Democrat

I - Independent

After the election, the composition of the council was:

↓
37	13	1
Labour	Conservative	LD

LD - Liberal Democrat

== Ward Results ==
All results are listed below:

=== Audley & Queen's Park ===
Audley & Queen's Park (3 councillors)
Party	Candidate	Votes	%	±%
Labour	Yusuf Jan-Virmani	1,528	70.4	
Labour	Maryam Batan	1,515	69.8	
Labour	Salim Sidat	1,484	68.4	
Green	Tariq Khan	316	14.6	
Conservative	Zafar-Ul Malik	308	14.2	
Conservative	Lee Parker	219	10.1	
Spoilt Ballots	—	18	—	—
Turnout		2,187	36.07	
Labour win (new seat)				
Labour win (new seat)				
Labour win (new seat)				

=== Bastwell & Daisyfield ===
Bastwell & Daisyfield (3 councillors)
Party	Candidate	Votes	%	±%
Labour	Parwaiz Akhtar	2,192	85.4	
Labour	Iftakhar Hussain	2,114	82.4	
Labour	Shaukat Hussain	2,075	80.9	
Conservative	Andrew Eastham	193	7.5	
Conservative	Michaely Coker	183	7.1	
Conservative	Francis Mathew Winkley Riding	166	6.5	
Spoilt Ballots		27		
Turnout		2,593	44.4	
Labour win (new seat)				
Labour win (new seat)				
Labour win (new seat)				

=== Billinge & Beardwood ===
Billinge & Beardwood (3 councillors)
Party	Candidate	Votes	%	±%
Labour	Tasleem Fazal	1,273	49.1	
Conservative	Julie Margaret Daley	1,206	46.5	
Labour	Jackie Floyd	1,192	46.0	
Labour	Arshid Mahmood	1,182	45.6	
Conservative	Sabir Esa	1,159	44.7	
Conservative	Imtiaz Ali	1,080	41.7	
Spoilt Ballots		48		
Turnout		2,641	44.93	
Labour win (new seat)				
Conservative win (new seat)				
Labour win (new seat)				

=== Blackburn Central ===
Blackburn Central (3 councillors)
Party	Candidate	Votes	%	±%
Labour	Zamir Khan	1,215	73.3	
Labour	Saima Afzal	1,174	70.9	
Labour	Faryad Hussain	1,127	68.0	
Conservative	Abdul Gaffar Makda	1400	75%	
Conservative	Rizwana Sindhu	236	14.2	
Conservative	Filip Szary	218	13.2	
Spoilt Ballots		63		
Turnout		1,720	29.7	
Labour win (new seat)				
Labour win (new seat)				
Labour win (new seat)				

=== Blackburn South & Lower Darwen ===
Blackburn South & Lower Darwen (3 councillors)
Party	Candidate	Votes	%	±%
Conservative	Jacquie Slater	1,055	64.4	
Conservative	Denise Gee	1,029	62.8	
Conservative	John Harold Slater	1,014	61.9	
Labour	Matt Gibson	645	39.4	
Labour	Tony Humphrys	624	38.1	
Labour	Carl Peter Nuttall	610	37.2	
Spoilt Ballots		36		
Turnout		1,675	29.47	
Conservative win (new seat)				
Conservative win (new seat)				
Conservative win (new seat)				

=== Blackburn South East ===
Blackburn South East (3 councillors)
Party	Candidate	Votes	%	±%
Labour	Jim Shorrock	826	59.2	
Labour	Andy Kay	811	58.1	
Labour	Vicky Ellen McGurk	773	55.4	
Conservative	Joan Bamber	346	24.8	
UKIP	Andrew Michael Madigan	280	11.3	
Conservative	Athshaam Hussain	263	10.6	
Spoilt Ballots		18		
Turnout		1,413	23.29	
Labour win (new seat)				
Labour win (new seat)				
Labour win (new seat)				

=== Darwen East ===
Darwen East (3 councillors)
Party	Candidate	Votes	%	±%
Labour	Jane Margaret Oates	828	46.4	
Liberal Democrats	Roy Peter Davies	800	44.8	
Labour	Kieran Robert Richards	750	42.0	
Liberal Democrats	Paul Nathaniel Browne	723	40.5	
Labour	Katrina Louise Shepherd	714	40.0	
Conservative	Ryan John David Slater	341	19.1	
Conservative	Lynn Perkins	293	16.4	
Conservative	Emily Kate Topping	265	14.8	
Spoilt Ballots		15		
Turnout		1,801	28.86	
Labour win (new seat)				
Liberal Democrats win (new seat)				
Labour win (new seat)				

=== Darwen South ===
Darwen South (3 councillors)
Party	Candidate	Votes	%	±%
Conservative	Kevin Connor	934	46.0	
Conservative	Neil Andrew Slater	874	43.1	
Conservative	Lilian Gladys Salton	817	40.3	
Labour	Lee Austin Ball	624	30.8	
Labour	Sarah Louise Rose	598	29.5	
Labour	Morgan Ann Crawshaw	577	28.4	
Liberal Democrats	Simon Huggill	574	28.3	
Liberal Democrats	Joan Hepple	545	26.9	
Spoilt Ballots		9		
Turnout		2,038	33.13	
Conservative win (new seat)				
Conservative win (new seat)				
Conservative win (new seat)				

=== Darwen West ===
Darwen West (3 councillors)
Party	Candidate	Votes	%	±%
Labour	David Smith	1,344	54.1	
Labour	Brian Taylor	1,237	49.8	
Labour	Stephanie Rose Brookfield	1,146	46.1	
Conservative	Konrad Jan Tapp	1,096	44.1	
Conservative	Andrew Stuart Walker	1,056	42.5	
Conservative	Joe Wilson Morgan	997	40.1	
UKIP	Ian John Grimshaw	131	5.3	
Spoilt Ballots		10		
Turnout		2,495	38.43	
Labour win (new seat)				
Labour win (new seat)				
Labour win (new seat)				

=== Ewood ===
Ewood (3 councillors)
Party	Candidate	Votes	%	±%
Labour	Maureen Bateson	993	57.8	
Labour	Jamie Groves	928	54.0	
Labour	Jim Casey	889	51.7	
Conservative	Keith Vincent Murray	680	39.6	
Conservative	Maureen McGarvey	634	36.9	
Conservative	Martin Needham	583	33.9	
Spoilt Ballots		21		
Turnout		1,740	27.87	
Labour win (new seat)				
Labour win (new seat)				
Labour win (new seat)				

=== Little Harwood & Whitebirk ===
Little Harwood & Whitebirk (3 councillors)
Party	Candidate	Votes	%	±%
Labour	Pat McFall	1,550	70.7	
Labour	Abdul Samad Patel	1,533	69.9	
Labour	Naushad Surve	1,490	67.9	
Conservative	David Robert Walsh	414	18.9	
Conservative	Asad Iqbal	380	17.3	
Conservative	Ismail Patel	356	16.2	
UKIP	Arlene Noone	193	8.8	
Spoilt Ballots		21		
Turnout		2,214	38.05	
Labour win (new seat)				
Labour win (new seat)				
Labour win (new seat)				

=== Livesey with Pleasington ===
Livesey with Pleasington (3 councillors)
Party	Candidate	Votes	%	±%
Conservative	Derek James Hardman	1,629	70.7	
Conservative	John Christopher Pearson	1,583	68.7	
Conservative	Paul David Marrow	1,578	68.5	
Labour	Pete Hollings	623	27.0	
Labour	Paul Rigby Mason	560	24.3	
Labour	Ashley Richard Whalley	560	24.3	
Spoilt Ballots		30		
Turnout		2,334	38.43	
Conservative win (new seat)				
Conservative win (new seat)				
Conservative win (new seat)				

=== Mill Hill & Moorgate ===
Mill Hill & Moorgate (3 councillors)
Party	Candidate	Votes	%	±%
Labour	Jim Smith	959	55.2	
Labour	Julie Louise Gunn	948	54.6	
Labour	Damian Talbot	903	52.0	
Conservative	Mark Russell	537	30.9	
Conservative	Ann Marie Helen Tolley	510	29.4	
Conservative	Judith Anne Pearson	494	28.5	
UKIP	Michael Longbottom	236	13.6	
Spoilt Ballots		3		
Turnout		1,739	30.48	
Labour win (new seat)				
Labour win (new seat)				
Labour win (new seat)				

=== Roe Lee ===
Roe Lee (3 councillors)
Party	Candidate	Votes	%	±%
Labour	Phil Riley	1,292	57.4	
Labour	Sylvia Liddle	1,253	55.7	
Labour	Ron Whittle	1,222	54.3	
Conservative	Tommy Temperley	875	38.9	
Conservative	Bilal Afzal	802	35.6	
Conservative	Asghar Ali	783	34.8	
Spoilt Ballots		33		
Turnout		2,284	37.5	
Labour win (new seat)				
Labour win (new seat)				
Labour win (new seat)				

=== Shear Brow & Corporation Park ===
Shear Brow & Corporation Park (3 councillors)
Party	Candidate	Votes	%	±%
Labour	Suleman Khonat	2,270	78.1	
Labour	Hussain Akhtar	1,947	67.0	
Labour	Mahfooz Hussain	1,547	53.2	
Independent	Muntazir Patel	960	33.0	
Conservative	Helen Alexandria Roscoe Voegt	583	20.1	
Conservative	Naseer Sajid	325	11.2	
Conservative	Mark Marrow	255	8.8	
Spoilt Ballots		36		
Turnout		2,943	48.97	
Labour win (new seat)				
Labour win (new seat)				
Labour win (new seat)				

=== Wensley Fold ===
Wensley Fold (3 councillors)
Party	Candidate	Votes	%	±%
Labour	Mohammed Khan	1,853	75.5	
Labour	Dave Harling	1,781	72.6	
Labour	Quesir Mahmood	1,742	71.0	
Conservative	Tariq Mahmood	415	16.9	
Green	Robin Richard Cubitt Field	403	16.4	
Conservative	Mags Marrow	314	12.8	
Conservative	Ghulam Sabir	248	10.1	
Spoilt Ballots		48		
Turnout		2,502	42.37	
Labour win (new seat)				
Labour win (new seat)				
Labour win (new seat)				

=== West Pennine ===
West Pennine (3 councillors)
Party	Candidate	Votes	%	±%
Conservative	Julie Helen Slater	1,530	57.0	
Conservative	Colin Rigby	1,411	52.6	
Conservative	Jean Valerie Rigby	1,369	51.0	
Labour	Matt Jackson	702	26.1	
Labour	Jude Rowley	697	26.0	
Labour	David John Hollings	648	24.1	
Liberal Democrats	John East	581	21.6	
Spoilt Ballots		36		
Turnout		2,721	43.87	
Conservative win (new seat)				
Conservative win (new seat)				
Conservative win (new seat)				
