= 2019 Blackburn with Darwen Borough Council election =

2019 UK local government election

- 2 May 2019

17 of 51 seats to Blackburn with Darwen Borough Council 26 seats needed for a majority

	First party	Second party
Leader	Mohammed Khan	John Slater
Party	Labour	Conservative
Last election	37 seats	13 seats
Seats before	37	13
Seats won	12	4
Seats after	36	13
Seat change	▼1	Steady
Popular vote	18,200	9,350
Percentage	55.3%	28.4%
- Winner of each seat at 2019 Blackburn with Darwen Borough Council election
Leader before election
Mohammed Khan
Labour
Leader after election
Mohammed Khan
Labour

The 2019 Blackburn with Darwen Borough Council election took place on 2 May 2019 to elect members of Blackburn with Darwen Borough Council in England. This was the same day as other local elections.

== Results summary ==
Blackburn with Darwen Borough Council, 2019
Party	This election			Full council			This election		
Party	Seats	Net	Seats %	Other	Total	Total %	Votes	Votes %	+/−
Labour	12	▼1	70.6%	24	36	70.6%	18,200	55.3%	
Conservative	4	Steady	23.5%	9	13	25.5%	9,350	28.4%	
Liberal Democrats	1	▲1	5.9%	1	2	3.9%	1,042	3.2%	
Independent	0	Steady	0%	0	0	0%	2,966	9.0%	
UKIP	0	Steady	0%	0	0	0%	1,134	3.4%	
For Britain	0	Steady	0%	0	0	0%	220	0.7%	N/A

== Council Composition ==
Prior to the election, the composition of the council was:

↓
37	13	1
Labour	Conservative	LD

LD - Liberal Democrat

After the election, the composition of the council was:

↓
36	13	2
Labour	Conservative	LD

LD - Liberal Democrat

== Ward results ==
All results are listed below:

=== Audley & Queen's Park ===
Audley & Queen's Park
Party	Candidate	Votes	%	±%
Labour	Salim Sidat	1,431	65.0	
Independent	Tiger Patel	584	26.5	
Conservative	Sarah Louise Morrison	188	8.5	
Majority		847	38.4	
Turnout		2,218	36.08	
Registered electors		6,147		
Labour hold		Swing		

=== Bastwell & Daisyfield ===
Bastwell & Daisyfield
Party	Candidate	Votes	%	±%
Labour	Shaukat Hussain	2,024	90.9	
Conservative	Henry Anthony Julian Arnold	203	9.1	
Majority		1,821	81.8	
Turnout		2,244	38.65	
Registered electors		5,806		
Labour hold		Swing		

=== Billinge & Beardwood ===
Billinge & Beardwood
Party	Candidate	Votes	%	±%
Labour	Jackie Floyd	1,144	48.2	
Conservative	Mark Russell	727	30.6	
Independent	Imtiaz Ali	502	21.2	
Majority		417	17.6	
Turnout		2,395	40.87	
Registered electors		5,860		
Labour hold		Swing		

=== Blackburn Central ===
Blackburn Central
Party	Candidate	Votes	%	±%
Labour	Mahfooz Hussain	1,274	81.7	
Conservative	Cameron Richard Prasher	286	18.3	
Majority		988	63.3	
Turnout		1,591	27.13	
Registered electors		5,864		
Labour hold		Swing		

=== Blackburn South & Lower Darwen ===
Blackburn South & Lower Darwen
Party	Candidate	Votes	%	±%
Conservative	John Slater	985	65.9	
Labour	Liz Johnson	509	34.1	
Majority		476	31.9	
Turnout		1,547	26.89	
Registered electors		5,753		
Conservative hold		Swing		

=== Blackburn South East ===
Blackburn South East
Party	Candidate	Votes	%	±%
Labour	Vicky Ellen McGurk	732	57.3	
UKIP	Liam Walsh	375	29.3	
Conservative	Martin Frank Kerry	171	13.4	
Majority		357	27.9	
Turnout		1,294	21.35	
Registered electors		6,060		
Labour hold		Swing		

=== Darwen East ===
Darwen East
Party	Candidate	Votes	%	±%
Liberal Democrats	Paul Nathaniel Browne	728	46.1	
Labour	Katrina Louise Shepherd	649	41.1	
Conservative	Ryan Slater	203	12.8	
Majority		79	5.0	
Turnout		1,626	25.51	
Registered electors		6,373		
Liberal Democrats gain from Labour		Swing		

=== Darwen South ===
Darwen South
Party	Candidate	Votes	%	±%
Conservative	Lilian Salton	949	52.2	
Labour	Lee Austin Ball	648	35.7	
For Britain	Liam David Robinson	220	12.1	
Majority		301	16.6	
Turnout		1,850	30.42	
Registered electors		6,081		
Conservative hold		Swing		

=== Darwen West ===
Darwen West
Party	Candidate	Votes	%	±%
Labour	Stephanie Rose Brookfield	1,145	54.5	
Conservative	Konrad Tapp	956	45.5	
Majority		189	9.0	
Turnout		2,156	33.38	
Registered electors		6,459		
Labour hold		Swing		

=== Ewood ===
Ewood
Party	Candidate	Votes	%	±%
Labour	Jim Casey	784	58.9	
Conservative	Keith Murray	546	41.1	
Majority		238	17.9	
Turnout		1,414	22.64	
Registered electors		6,246		
Labour hold		Swing		

=== Little Harwood & Whitebirk ===
Little Harwood & Whitebirk
Party	Candidate	Votes	%	±%
Labour	Mustafa Ali Desai	1,547	77.2	
UKIP	Grant Carl Pugh	252	12.6	
Conservative	Judith Anne Pearson	206	10.3	
Majority		1,295	64.6	
Turnout		2,014	34.50	
Registered electors		5,838		
Labour hold		Swing		

=== Livesey with Pleasington ===
Livesey with Pleasington
Party	Candidate	Votes	%	±%
Conservative	Paul David Marrow	1,478	76.1	
Labour	Paul Rigby Mason	463	23.9	
Majority		1,015	52.3	
Turnout		2,008	32.75	
Registered electors		6,131		
Conservative hold		Swing		

=== Mill Hill & Moorgate ===
Mill Hill & Moorgate
Party	Candidate	Votes	%	±%
Labour	Damian Talbot	713	47.5	
UKIP	Michael Longbottom	507	33.8	
Conservative	Ann Marie Helen Tolley	281	18.7	
Majority		206	13.7	
Turnout		1,518	27.10	
Registered electors		5,601		
Labour hold		Swing		

=== Roe Lee ===
Roe Lee
Party	Candidate	Votes	%	±%
Labour	Ron Whittle	1,314	66.4	
Conservative	Asghar Ali	664	33.6	
Majority		650	32.9	
Turnout		2,038	33.01	
Registered electors		6,173		
Labour hold		Swing		

=== Shear Brow & Corporation Park ===
Shear Brow & Corporation Park
Party	Candidate	Votes	%	±%
Labour	Zainab Rawat	1,457	53.2	
Independent	Muntazir Patel	1,033	37.7	
Conservative	Helen Alexandria Roscoe Voegt	247	9.0	
Majority		424	15.5	
Turnout		2,746	45.22	
Registered electors		6,072		
Labour hold		Swing		

=== Wensley Fold ===
Wensley Fold
Party	Candidate	Votes	%	±%
Labour	Quesir Mahmood	1,958	89.2	
Conservative	Carolyn Marrow	238	10.8	
Majority		1,720	78.3	
Turnout		2,236	37.39	
Registered electors		5,981		
Labour hold		Swing		

=== West Pennine ===
West Pennine
Party	Candidate	Votes	%	±%
Conservative	Jean Rigby	1,022	39.4	
Independent	Philip McDermott	847	32.7	
Labour	Jude David Rowley	408	15.7	
Liberal Democrats	John East	314	12.1	
Majority		175	6.8	
Turnout		2,614	42.15	
Registered electors		6,201		
Conservative hold		Swing		

== Changes 2019–2021 ==
- 16 February 2021 – 26 April 2021: Iftakhar Hussain (Bastwell & Daisyfield) briefly left the Labour Party to sit as an independent councillor, before rejoining Labour shortly before the 2021 election.
