= 2021 Blackburn with Darwen Borough Council election =

2021 UK local government election

- 6 May 2021

17 of 51 seats to Blackburn with Darwen Borough Council 26 seats needed for a majority

	First party	Second party
Leader	Mohammed Khan	John Slater
Party	Labour	Conservative
Last election	36 seats	13 seats
Seats before	35	13
Seats won	11	6
Seats after	35	14
Seat change	Steady	▲1
Popular vote	18,325	12,854
Percentage	55.4%	38.8%
- Winner of each seat at 2021 Blackburn with Darwen Borough Council election
Leader before election
Mohammed Khan
Labour
Leader after election
Mohammed Khan
Labour

The 2021 Blackburn with Darwen Borough Council election took place on 6 May 2021 to elect members of Blackburn with Darwen Borough Council in England. This was on the same day as other local elections. One-third of the seats were up for election.

== Result summary ==
2021 Blackburn with Darwen Council election
Party	This election			Full council			This election		
Party	Seats	Net	Seats %	Other	Total	Total %	Votes	Votes %	+/−
Labour	11	Steady	64.7	24	35	68.6	18,325	55.4	+0.1
Conservative	6	▲1	35.3	8	14	27.5	12,854	38.8	+10.4
Liberal Democrats	0	▼1	0.0	1	1	2.0	1,654	5.0	+1.8
Independent	0	Steady	0.0	1	1	2.0	260	0.8	-8.2

== Council Composition ==
Prior to the election, the composition of the council was:

↓
35	13	1	1
Labour	Conservative	LD	Ind

LD - Liberal Democrat
Ind - Independent politician

After the election, the composition of the council was:

↓
35	14	1
Labour	Conservative	Ind

Ind - Independent politician

== Ward results ==
=== Audley & Queen's Park ===
Audley & Queen's Park
Party	Candidate	Votes	%	±%
Conservative	Tiger Patel	1,209	52.5	+26.0
Labour	Maryam Batan	1,096	47.5	–17.5
Majority		113	4.9	N/A
Turnout		2,330	36.7	
Conservative gain from Labour		Swing		

=== Bastwell and Daisyfield ===
Bastwell and Daisyfield
Party	Candidate	Votes	%	±%
Labour	Iftakhar Hussain	1,932	84.9	−6.0
Conservative	Les Cade	344	15.1	+6.0
Majority		1,588	69.8	
Turnout		2,304	39	
Labour hold		Swing		

=== Billinge and Beardwood ===
Billinge and Beardwood
Party	Candidate	Votes	%	±%
Labour	Mohammed Irfan	1,188	54.1	+5.9
Conservative	Rizwan Shah	884	40.3	+9.7
Independent	Ismail Patel	124	5.6	N/A
Majority		304	13.8	
Turnout		2,232	36.9	
Labour gain from Conservative		Swing		

=== Blackburn Central ===
Blackburn Central
Party	Candidate	Votes	%	±%
Labour	Samim Desai	1,158	75.1	−6.6
Conservative	Carolyn Marrow	383	24.9	+6.6
Majority		775	50.3	
Turnout		1,569	25.6	
Labour hold		Swing		

=== Blackburn South and Lower Darwen ===
Blackburn South and Lower Darwen
Party	Candidate	Votes	%	±%
Conservative	Denise Gee	1,140	70.1	+4.2
Labour	Liz Johnson	487	29.9	−4.2
Majority		653	40.1	
Turnout		1,647	28	
Conservative hold		Swing		

=== Blackburn South East ===
Blackburn South East
Party	Candidate	Votes	%	±%
Labour	Tony Humphrys	720	59.0	+1.7
Conservative	Ann Tolley	392	32.1	+18.7
Liberal Democrats	Connor Plumley	108	8.9	N/A
Majority		328	26.9	
Turnout		1,228	20	
Labour hold		Swing		

=== Darwen East ===
Darwen East
Party	Candidate	Votes	%	±%
Labour	Katrina Fielding	678	38.2	−2.9
Liberal Democrats	Roy Davies	634	35.7	−10.4
Conservative	Ryan Slater	329	18.5	+5.7
Independent	Sue Prynn	136	7.7	N/A
Majority		44	2.5	N/A
Turnout		1,796	27.1	
Labour gain from Liberal Democrats		Swing		

=== Darwen South ===
Darwen South
Party	Candidate	Votes	%	±%
Conservative	Andrew Walker	1,037	54.0	+1.8
Labour	Sarah Rose	509	26.5	−9.2
Liberal Democrats	Simon Huggill	374	19.5	N/A
Majority		528	27.5	
Turnout		1,942	30.9	
Conservative hold		Swing		

=== Darwen West ===
Darwen West
Party	Candidate	Votes	%	±%
Labour	Brian Taylor	1,257	57.0	+2.5
Conservative	Janine Crook	846	38.4	−7.1
Liberal Democrats	Diane McVee	101	4.6	N/A
Majority		411	18.6	
Turnout		2,231	34.7	
Labour hold		Swing		

=== Ewood ===
Ewood
Party	Candidate	Votes	%	±%
Conservative	Jon Baldwin	740	51.1	+10.0
Labour	Ashley Whalley	709	48.9	−10.0
Majority		31	2.1	N/A
Turnout		1,471	23.4	
Conservative gain from Labour		Swing		

=== Little Harwood and Whitebirk ===
Little Harwood and Whitebirk
Party	Candidate	Votes	%	±%
Labour	Abdul Patel	1,423	72.8	−4.4
Conservative	Iain Sykes	533	27.2	+16.9
Majority		890	45.5	
Turnout		1,967	32.4	
Labour hold		Swing		

=== Livesey with Pleasington ===
Livesey with Pleasington
Party	Candidate	Votes	%	±%
Conservative	Mark Russell	1,616	73.4	−2.7
Labour	Michael Jackson	585	26.6	+2.7
Majority		1,031	46.8	
Turnout		2,235	35	
Conservative hold		Swing		

=== Mill Hill and Moorgate ===
Mill Hill and Moorgate
Party	Candidate	Votes	%	±%
Labour	Julie Gunn	724	54.2	+6.7
Conservative	Rick Moore	612	45.8	+27.1
Majority		112	8.4	
Turnout		1,356	24.1	
Labour hold		Swing		

=== Roe Lee ===
Roe Lee
Party	Candidate	Votes	%	±%
Labour	Sylvia Liddle	1,165	59.0	−7.4
Conservative	Martin Kerry	810	41.0	+7.4
Majority		355	18.0	
Turnout		1,999	31.1	
Labour hold		Swing		

=== Shear Brow and Corporation Park ===
Shear Brow and Corporation Park
Party	Candidate	Votes	%	±%
Labour	Hussain Akhtar	2,428	91.1	+37.9
Conservative	Aaliyah Alli	237	8.9	−0.1
Majority		2,191	82.2	
Turnout		2,692	43	
Labour hold		Swing		

=== Wensley Fold ===
Wensley Fold
Party	Candidate	Votes	%	±%
Labour	Dave Harling	1,698	87.8	−1.4
Conservative	Helen Voegt	235	12.2	+1.4
Majority		1,463	75.7	
Turnout		1,948	31.9	
Labour hold		Swing		

=== West Pennine ===
West Pennine
Party	Candidate	Votes	%	±%
Conservative	Neil Slater	1,507	60.0	+20.6
Labour	Matthew Jackson	569	22.6	+6.9
Liberal Democrats	John East	437	17.4	+5.3
Majority		938	37.3	
Turnout		2,536	40.7	
Conservative hold		Swing		
