= England First Party =

English nationalist political party

- Abbreviation: EFP
- Leader: Mark Cotterill, 2003– 2012
- Founded: 2 September 2003
- Dissolved: 14 June 2012
- Ideology: Ethnic nationalism English nationalism English independence Euroscepticism
- National affiliation: Nationalist Alliance (2005–2008)
- Colours: Black White

Website
- efp.org.uk (Archive)

The England First Party (EFP) was an English nationalist political party. It had two councillors on Blackburn with Darwen council between 2006 and 2007.

== Formation and policies ==
They were formed in 2004 by Mark Cotterill who had been the founder and chairman of American Friends of the British National Party. However, he began to disagree with the BNP politically, and so formed the EFP, after a spell in the White Nationalist Party.

The EFP differed from the BNP in its analysis of the United Kingdom. It criticised British nationalism and supported English nationalism instead. Most members of the EFP were former BNP members like their chairman, Cotterill.

The EFP campaigned against the creation of regional assemblies across England. They also campaigned on issues such as opposing immigration in England and opposing the UK's continued membership of the European Union.

On the economy, the EFP supported the gradual nationalisation of most national and public services in attempts to achieve autarky. While not aiming to abolish capitalist ownership, the EFP claimed the interests of workers to be paramount and subsequently supported worker co-operatives. The EFP also aimed to end the connections between trade unions and the Labour Party while encouraging trade union membership and re-nationalising and re-opening coal mines which had a "reasonable working life".

According to the accounts filed with the Electoral Commission the party had 27 full members at year-end 2004 and 85 "supporters". By the end of 2005 this had increased to 39 paid members and 97 registered supporters. For the year end 2007 the party recognised "100 supporters". By year end 2010, England First had 42 full members and recognised 111 supporters.

It sold a magazine Heritage and Destiny, which ran issues every year from July 1999. It provided news on the progress of racial nationalism in Britain, Europe and America.

=== Policies on religion ===
The EFP was criticised for a section of its manifesto that promised "the abolition of all non-European faiths and religions". On 4 June 2010 Mark Cotterill issued a statement that "[f]ar from wishing to "abolish" any religion (from the East or West!), the EFP is committed to traditional English values of religious freedom." A later version of the party manifesto, last edited 28 April 2010, did not contain the call for abolition of non-European religions.

== Elections ==
In their first electoral test, a local government by-election in February 2004 for the Heysham South ward in Lancaster, the EFP polled 14%. In the May 2004 local elections, the EFP contested three seats in Blackburn, Preston and Macclesfield, polling an average of 18% of the vote.

Two candidates contested the May 2006 local elections in Blackburn, polling an average of 37% of the vote and both were elected as councillors. In a by-election in the East Rural ward of Blackburn in September 2006, they polled 13%. They also contested a by-election in the Danehouse and Stoneyholme ward in Burnley in February 2007, polling 7%. Despite the party campaigning for a ban on mixed-race marriages it was revealed that one of the two elected councillors was reported to have a great-grandmother from the West Indies and a grandfather from Wales. Steven Smith and Simon Bennett stood in the Cliviger with Worsthorne and Queensgate wards respectively, at the 2007 Burnley council elections. Smith came a very distant second with Bennett third in a closer vote.

=== 2010 elections ===
The EFP fielded seven candidates for the 2010 local elections three of them to compete against the BNP in Stoke, but it did not stand in the general election and they had encouraged EFP supporters to vote for the National Front.

It came fourth place with 606 votes in the Longton North ward, fifth place with 117 votes in the Weston and Meir ward and sixth place in the Fenton ward with 236 votes in the Stoke-on-Trent local elections.

In the Preston Ribbleton ward, Mark Cotterill came fourth place with 315 votes; it came fourth place in the St James ward in Oldham with 425 votes, in the Bradley ward of Pendle it received 279 coming fourth place and sixth place in the Ince ward of Wigan with 134 votes.

== Resignations ==
In March 2007 the EFP's two councillors announced their intentions to quit. Michael Johnson stated that he would be joining a new party created by himself and Tony Melia For Darwen, while Mark Cotterill signalled his intention to stand down as a councillor and party leader at the 3 May local elections. Johnson's move followed a rift with the party after he objected to an anti-Islamic cartoon of Jesus on YouTube, while Cotterill—who remained a leading EFP activist—has put his decision down to a work-related move to Preston.

== Defection to England First Party ==
On 1 May 2009, a former British National Party councillor, John Gamble, confirmed that he had defected to the EFP, after criticising the BNP. In the preceding months, he had become increasingly disillusioned with the BNP's national and local leadership, this resulted in him being expelled from the BNP. He sat as an independent for a few days and then he decided to "join a party that offers a serious, radical challenge to the corrupt political establishment".

On 12 March 2010, John Gamble defected from the EFP to the National Front. This was after he told The Star newspaper in Sheffield he had "jumped ship" to the NF because he wanted to join a "more active" organisation than England First.

On 1 April 2010, Gamble defected back to England First because he stated to The Star, "I am not aware of the severity of these opinions" when some of the NF's recorded views were put to him. On 5 April 2010 England First refused to take him back. England First's chairman, Mark Cotterill, said: "While we have nothing against Cllr. Gamble, the fact is that despite his various and contradictory public statements he has had no involvement with the EFP – and is no longer an EFP member." Mr Cotterill went on to release a statement to The Sheffield Star saying, "We don't want anything to do with Councillor Gamble. He has done nothing for the party, and when he left we washed our hands of him."

== Support to the English Democrats ==
In May 2009, the England First Party decided to stand a candidate in the County council elections in Lancashire but did not stand any European candidates. For the European Parliament, the England First Party worked with the English Democrats and attended and spoke at the English Democrats' conference in Darwen. Cotterill stated that the parties had differences on race, immigration and independence but they had in common withdrawal from EU and putting England first.

The party was de-registered on 14 June 2012, and as such the name "England First Party" cannot be used on ballot papers by candidates at elections.
