= Blackburn with Darwen Borough Council =

Local authority in England

Type
- Type: Unitary authority

Leadership
- Mayor: Mahfooz Hussain, Labour since 21 May 2026
- Leader: Phil Riley, Labour since 19 May 2022
- Chief Executive: Denise Park since May 2019

Structure
- Seats: 51 councillors
- Graph of the party split among 51 seats.
- Political groups: Administration (20) Labour (20) Other parties (31) Reform (9) Conservative (5) Independent (17)
- Length of term: 4 years

Elections
- Voting system: First-past-the-post
- Last election: 7 May 2026
- Next election: 6 May 2027

Motto
- Arte et Labore

Meeting place
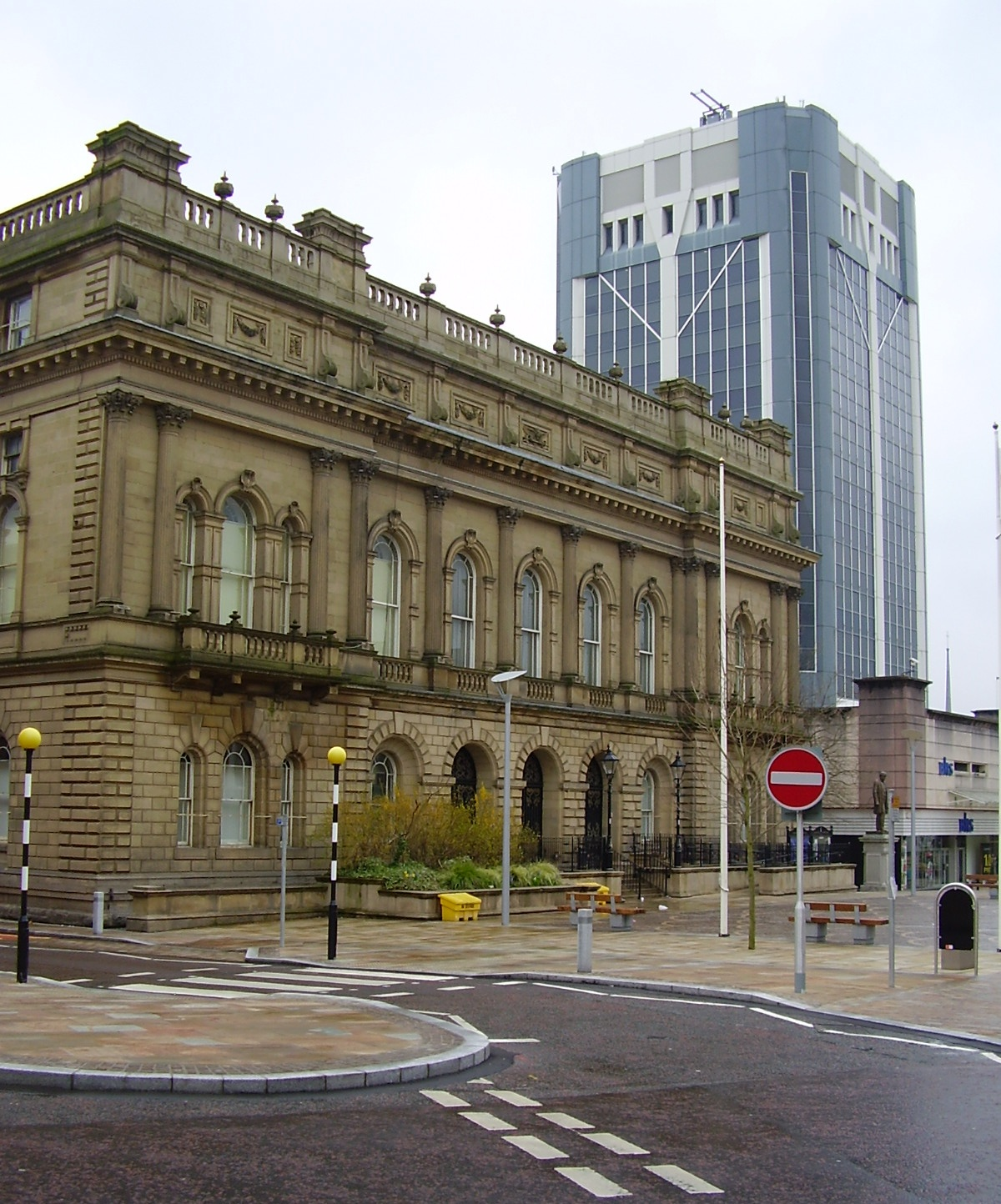
- Town Hall, King William Street, Blackburn, BB1 7DY

Website
- www.blackburn.gov.uk

Blackburn with Darwen Borough Council is the local authority of Blackburn with Darwen in the ceremonial county of Lancashire, England. Since 1998 it has been a unitary authority, being a district council which also performs the functions of a county council; it is independent from Lancashire County Council. The borough council has been a member of the Lancashire Combined County Authority since its formation in 2025.

The council has been under no overall control since the 2026 election, being run by a Labour minority administration. It is based at Blackburn Town Hall.

== History ==
The town of Blackburn was governed by a body of improvement commissioners from 1803. The town was incorporated to become a municipal borough in 1851, after which it was governed by a body formally called the 'mayor, aldermen and burgesses of the borough of Blackburn', generally known as the corporation, town council or borough council. When elected county councils were established in 1889, Blackburn was considered large enough for its existing council to provide county-level services, and so it was made a county borough, independent from the new Lancashire County Council, whilst remaining part of the ceremonial county of Lancashire.

A larger Blackburn district was created in 1974 under the Local Government Act 1972. It gained the neighbouring town of Darwen and several other rural parishes, and became a non-metropolitan district, with Lancashire County Council providing county-level services. Blackburn's borough status was transferred to the enlarged district, allowing the chair of the council to take the title of mayor, continuing Blackburn's series of mayors dating back to 1851.

The borough was renamed Blackburn with Darwen in May 1997.

The council became a unitary authority on 1 April 1998. The way the change was implemented was to create a new non-metropolitan county covering the same area as the borough, but with no separate county council; instead, the existing borough council took on county council functions. Blackburn with Darwen remains part of the ceremonial county of Lancashire for the purposes of lieutenancy.

In 2025, the council became a member of the new Lancashire Combined County Authority.

== Governance ==
As a unitary authority, Blackburn with Darwen Borough Council provides both district-level and county-level functions. Parts of the borough are covered by civil parishes, which form an additional tier of local government for their areas. The exceptions are the main part of the Blackburn urban area (roughly corresponding to the pre-1974 borough) and the Hoddlesden area, which are unparished.

=== Political control ===
The council went under no overall control at the 2026 election. Labour remains the largest party, and runs the council as a minority administration.

Political control of the council since the 1974 reforms has been as follows:

Lower tier non-metropolitan district

Party in control	Years
No overall control	1974–1983
Labour	1983–1984
No overall control	1984–1986
Labour	1986–1987
No overall control	1987–1988
Labour	1988–1998

Unitary authority

Party in control	Years
Labour	1998–2007
No overall control	2007–2011
Labour	2011–2026
No overall control	2026-present

=== Leadership ===
The role of mayor is largely ceremonial in Blackburn with Darwen. Political leadership is instead provided by the leader of the council. The leaders since 1989 have been:

Councillor	Party	From	To
Frank Higham	Labour		11 May 1989
Peter Greenwood	Labour	11 May 1989	15 Feb 1994
Malcolm Doherty	Labour	Feb 1994	Jun 2001
Bill Taylor	Labour	Jun 2001	Jun 2004
Kate Hollern	Labour	1 Jul 2004	May 2007
Colin Rigby	Conservative	May 2007	Jan 2009
Michael Lee	Conservative	Jan 2009	14 Sep 2010
Kate Hollern	Labour	14 Sep 2010	31 Mar 2015
Mohammed Khan	Labour	21 May 2015	May 2022
Phil Riley	Labour	19 May 2022	

=== Composition ===
Following the 2026 election the composition of the council was:

Party	Seats
Labour	20
Reform	9
Conservative	5
Independent	17
Total	51

Of the independent councillors, 11 sit together as the '4BwD' group, and the other six do not belong to a group. The next election is due in 2027.

== Elections ==
Since the last boundary changes in 2018, the council has comprised 51 councillors elected from 17 wards, with each ward electing three councillors. Elections are held three years out of every four, with a third of the council (one councillor for each ward) being elected each time for a four-year term.

== Premises ==
The council is based at Blackburn Town Hall on King William Street in the centre of Blackburn. The building was built for the old Blackburn Borough Council and completed in 1856. A tower block annexe was added in 1969, linked to the old building by a bridge. The council also maintains an area office at Darwen Town Hall, completed in 1882 for the old Darwen Borough Council.

Awards and achievements
Preceded by Hammersmith and Fulham	LGC Council of the Year; 2011	Succeeded by Southend-on-Sea
