= Blackburn Exchange Assembly Rooms =

Historic building built in 1860

Exchange Assembly Rooms
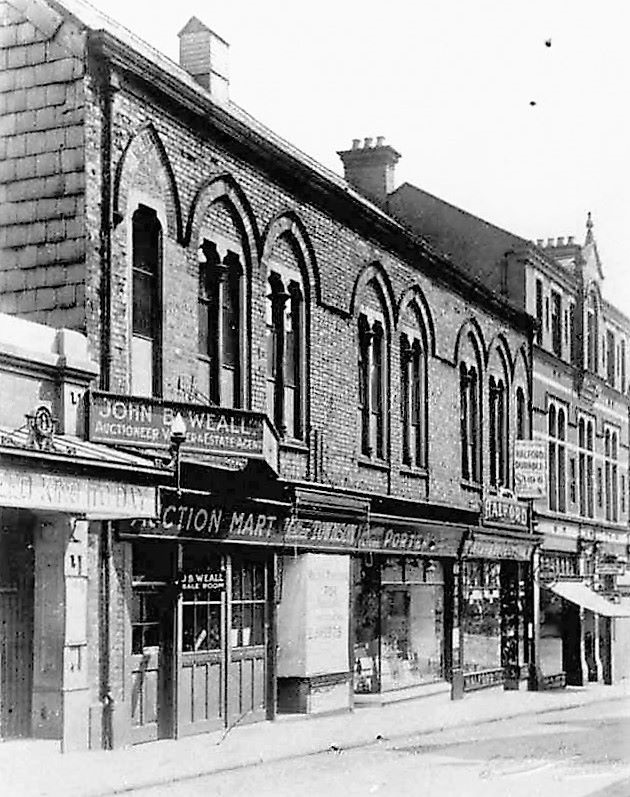
- Interactive map of the Exchange Assembly Rooms area

General information
- Location: Blackburn, England
- Coordinates: 53°44′59″N 2°29′06″W
- Completed: 1860; 166 years ago
- Demolished: 1936
- Cost: £960 1d 1s
- Client: Catholic Brethren

Technical details
- Floor area: 528 square yards

The Exchange Assembly Rooms were on Town Hall Street, Blackburn. Built by the Catholic Brethren in 1860, the rooms were later purchased by the Blackburn Exchange Company and become part of their Cotton Exchange estate, accommodating businesses and entertainment until their demolition in 1936.

== History ==
=== Catholic hall ===
The building was constructed in 1860, at a cost of £960 1s 1d, by the Catholic Brethren for use as a Catholic Hall. Adverts from 1860 show it was used as a place for auctions of china, glass and other houseware. It also hosted community activities such as reading classes for local men during the Cotton Famine in 1861, and dance classes for children and adults in 1863.

=== Sale to the Exchange Company ===
While the building was still under construction in 1860, the Blackburn Exchange Company were looking for sites to build their new Cotton Exchange. The Exchange Company were keen to obtain the land opposite Blackburn Town Hall as they felt their new Exchange should have a central location in the town close to other prominent buildings. At the time, the site included the Feilden's Arms and the partly built Catholic Hall, which the Exchange Company planned to buy and demolish to make way for their new building. Initial talks took place, and the Exchange Company thought that a sale of the Catholic Hall would be forthcoming.

However, by February 1860, a dispute arose over the sale price of the building. The Catholic Brethren were seeking £1600, which they considered a fair price for the site, but after some discussions, the Exchange Company backed out of talks and announced they would continue their plans without acquiring the site.

The dispute continued and became a public matter through a series of letters published in the local press. Opinion pieces in favour of the Exchange Company were printed accusing the Catholic Brethren of asking for too much for the site and of trying to take advantage of the Exchange Company. In response, Robert Davenport, secretary to the Catholic Hall Committee wrote an open letter defending their position. Davenport wrote that he recognised that the Exchange Company were unhappy at the asking price of £1,600, but claimed their costs for the building would be £2,348 9s 9d, broken down to include £960 1s 1d for contractor costs; £656 5s for increased land costs, to which the Exchange Co had agreed; £19 19s 9d a year in additional land rental expenses from moving to another site; £621 10s 11d that would need to be invested in Government bonds to cover an increased rent; £45 for loss by delay on completion; £50 for cash paid on contract; and £215 12 10d for unexpected costs.

While the sale of the Catholic Hall did not proceed at this time, the Exchange Company did buy the Feilden's Arms, renaming it to the Exchange Hotel, and modifiying their plans for a smaller site.

On the 30 September 1863, the Catholic Hall came up for sale in an auction held by Mr John Salisbury at the Borough Arms Hotel, Exchange Street. The hall was described as having three large shops, an assembly room, outbuildings and appurtenances, and a yearly rent of £25 5s 0d. The auction was won by Mr J W Blackburn, acting for the Exchange Company, and so the Catholic Hall was sold to the Exchange Company for a price of £1,300. Soon after, the hall came to be known as the "Exchange Assembly Rooms".

=== Alterations ===
By 1885, the Assembly Rooms were connected by a corridor to the Exchange Hall, also owned by the Blackburn Exchange Company. This allowed the Assembly Rooms to be used as an extension to the Hall for larger events, such as at the Venetian Fair held at the Exchange Hall in 1885, where the Assembly Rooms held a waxwork show, a panorama of Egypt, and magic show.

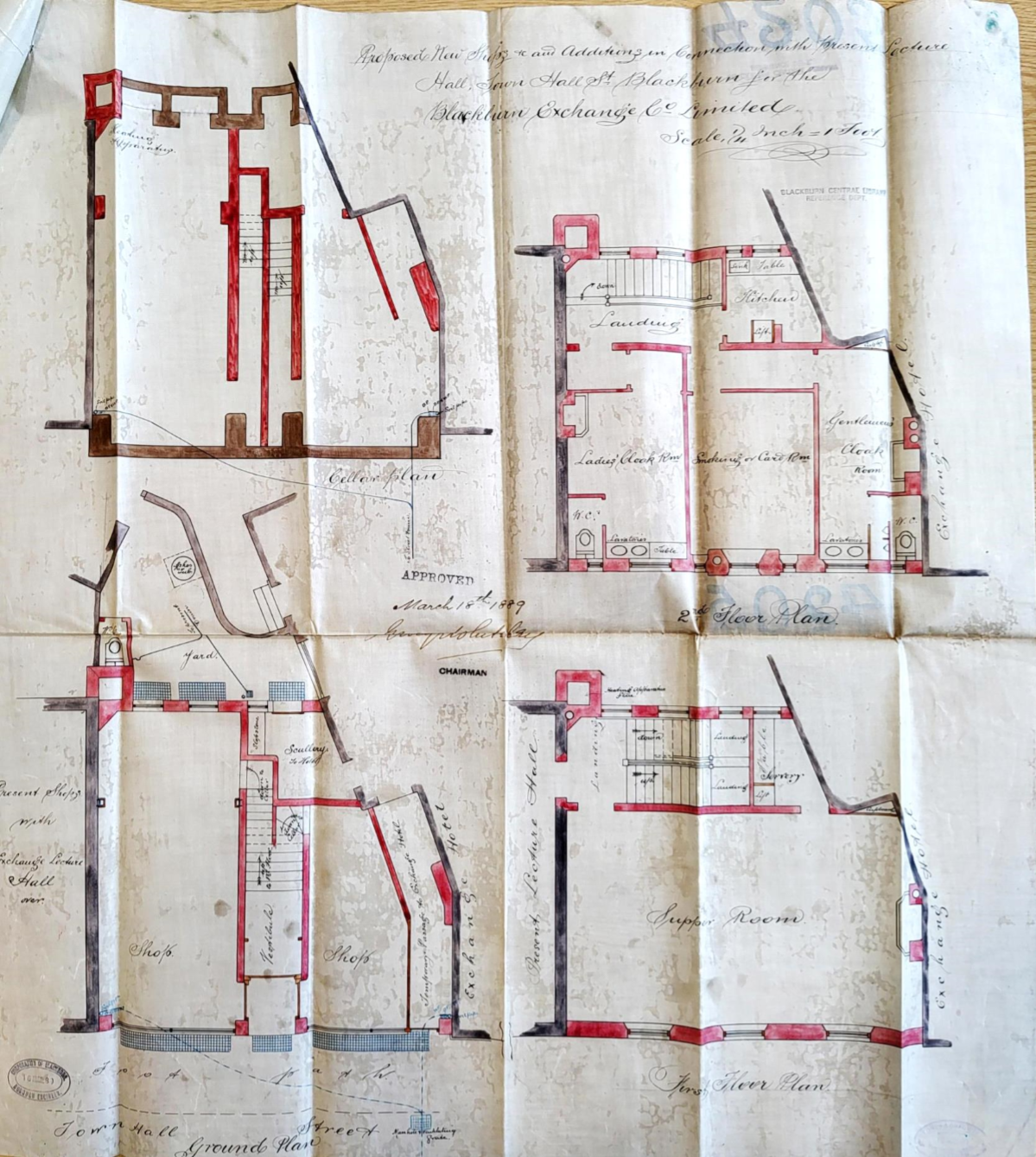
Planning Application for Proposed New Shops and Alterations to Exchange Lecture Hall for Exchange Company 1889

In March 1889, the Exchange Company submitted plans for a new building on a vacant plot between the Assembly Rooms and the Exchange Hotel. This building consisted of two self-contained shops on the ground floor, a supper room on the first floor that connected to the Assembly Rooms, and cloak rooms and a smoking room on the second floor.

Further building changes were made in 1898 with a new bridge connecting to the Exchange Hall, and some space within the Assembly Rooms repurposed as a retiring or ante room for performers at the Exchange Hall.

=== Demolition ===
Around the start of the 20th century, there were talks of replacing the existing Town Hall of Blackburn Corporation with new administrative buildings. There was a need for more space as the Corporations duties grew, and some thought that the town should have grander public buildings to match its prominent role in the cotton industry. The Post Office were also looking for a site for a new Blackburn office, and both the Town Hall and Exchange Hall sites were under consideration.

A public discussion followed, which included leaflets and correspondence in the local newspaper. One contributor under the pseudonym "Civicus" suggested that the whole block containing the Exchange Hall and Assembly Rooms should be demolished and a new "Queen's Hall" be constructed as a temporary town hall while a larger site was erected on Northgate.

In 1913, local businessman Thomas Ritzema, published plans in which the Exchange block would have been demolished and left as an open green space with a statue, leaving an unobstructed view from the Town Hall to Northgate. These plans were rejected by the Corporation, but modified plans were submitted that would have still demolished the block but replaced it with a smaller construction with space for twenty-four shops.

The Assembly Rooms were finally demolished in 1935 while under the ownership of auctioneer John Weall, who had an auction room on the ground floor. The site was rebuilt as a three-storey building, and became the home of Tony Billington's dancehall, known as the New Empress Ballroom.

== Uses ==
The building was split into three retail units on the lower floor, and a large room on the upper floor.

=== Retail units ===
The retail units hosted several businesses, including:

- Telegraph Office
- W Smith Spirit Merchant
- C Balshaw Provision Merchant
- John Waring Auctioneer
- Thomas Whewell Spirit Merchant
- J B Weall Auctioneer
- Crompton and Davies Motor Engineers

=== Assembly room ===
The upstairs assembly room was used for one off events, though for some periods had regular or long-term tenants. These include:

- Free Library - used by the town's Free Library between 1864 and 1874 before the construction of Blackburn Museum and Art Gallery
- Charles Dickens - as part of his Farewell Readings, Charles Dickens visited the Exchange Assembly to read from Christmas Carol and Mr Bob Sawyer's Party on 19 April 1869.

== Other names ==
The Assembly Rooms were known by various names due to its changing ownership and use. Names used in historical documents include:

- Catholic Hall
- Wesleyan Mission Rooms
- Exchange Assembly Rooms
- Exchange Lecture Hall
- Town Hall Street Assembly Rooms
