= Listed buildings in Blackburn =

Blackburn is a town in Lancashire, England. It contains 72 buildings that are recorded in the National Heritage List for England as designated listed buildings. Of these, five are listed at Grade II*, the middle grade, and the others are at Grade II, the lowest grade. Until the coming of the Industrial Revolution, Blackburn was a market town, but then became a centre of the cotton industry. The Leeds and Liverpool Canal came to the town in 1806, and the Blackburn and Preston Railway opened in 1846. Following this there was a boom on the building of mills, with associated housing and the creation of civic buildings.

The listed buildings reflect the history of the town. The earliest examples are farmhouses and farm buildings. These are followed by houses for the wealthy and for the workers. Later listed buildings relate to the canal, the railway, and industry; there are churches, civic buildings, a former fire station, shops, structures in the public park, and the parish church that later became a cathedral.

== Key ==
Grade	Criteria
II*	Particularly important buildings of more than special interest
II	Buildings of national importance and special interest

== Buildings ==
Name and location	Photograph	Date	Notes	Grade
Myles Wife Hey; 53.76881°N 2.46567°W		1543	A stone farmhouse with a flagged roof. The central portion is in a single storey, and this is flanked by two two-storey gabled wings. Each portion contains mullioned windows, and in the right wing is a doorway with a four-centred arch, and a circular window in the gable.	II*
Eddy Holes, stables and shippon 53.77403°N 2.46310°W		16th century	A stone farmhouse with attached farm buildings under a stone flagged roof. The building has two storeys, with a two-storey porch containing stone benches on the front, and mullioned windows. To the right are stables, and to the left is a shippon. The house has associations with the Knights Templars.	II*
Upper Mickle Hey Farmhouse and farm buildings 53.77637°N 2.46213°W	—	1591	The stone farmhouse is long and low, with a slate roof, and is in two storeys, with a wing on the left. There is a two-storey gabled porch with a sash window and a datestone. The other windows vary, some of them being mullioned. Attached to the farmhouse are farm buildings of various dates, including shippons, stables, and barns, which are included in the listing.	II
Bank House, fountain and statues 53.75218°N 2.49615°W	—	17th century (probable)	A stone house with a stone flagged roof and a rear extension in brick, in two storeys. There is a two-storey porch with ball finials, and the windows are mullioned with sashes. In the garden is a 19th-century fountain consisting of a naked boy on a square stone column blowing up a jet of water. Also in the garden are two statues, one of Orpheus with a lyre and the other of Eurydice in chains. The fountain and the statues are included in the listing.	II
Further Wilworth; 53.77142°N 2.48458°W	—	17th century	A row of four stone cottages with flagged roofs in two low storeys. Each cottage has two windows in each floor, some of which are mullioned, and others are sashes.	II
St Stephen's Conservative Club; 53.75934°N 2.46416°W	—	17th century	This building originated as a house, Little Harwood Hall, and it was refronted in the 18th century. The south front is the older part, it is in stone and has three storeys. Two wings in Jacobean style project from it, and the windows are mullioned. The north front is stuccoed, and in two storeys. It has a Tuscan doorway with a fluted frieze, a broken pediment, and a fanlight, and the windows are sashes. The building is joined by a curved wall to a former coach house, both of which are included in the listing.	II
43 King Street and 1 Freckleton Street; 53.74612°N 2.48734°W	—	Late 17th century (probable)	Formerly an inn, the front on King Street is in brick with stone dressings, and that on Freckleton Street is in stone. The building has three storeys, and contains mullioned windows and a pilastered doorway.	II
Fernhurst Court; 53.72478°N 2.48923°W	—	1700	Originally a farmhouse, it is in stone with a roof that is partly flagged and partly slated, and there are two storeys. On the front is a gabled porch that has a lintel inscribed with the date, and ball finials. The windows were mullioned; some mullions remain and elsewhere sash windows have been inserted.	II
Red Lion Inn; 53.75388°N 2.44586°W		1735	A public house in stone with two storeys. In each floor are two four-light and one three-light windows, all of which are mullioned. The door has a moulded opening.	II
2 King Street; 53.74735°N 2.48489°W	—	1745	The building is in painted brick, in three storeys with a five-bay front. In the centre is a doorway with Tuscan half-columns, a broken pediment, and a round-arched fanlight. In the ground floor are shop fronts, and above are sash windows.	II
4 King Street; 53.74724°N 2.48496°W	—	18th century	A brick house, later used as an office, with a stuccoed base, and stone dressings. It has two storeys and a symmetrical five-bay front. In the centre is a doorway with Tuscan half-columns, a broken pediment, and a round-arched fanlight. There is a three-bay extension to the left in three storeys.	II
35 and 37 King Street, 2 Heaton Street; 53.74628°N 2.48675°W	—	18th century	Three brick shops on a stone plinth with three storeys. In the ground floor are shop fronts, and the upper floors contain sash windows. The entrance to No. 37 King Street is approached up steps and has a doorcase with slim Ionic columns and a modillion cornice. Along the top of the shops is another modillion cornice.	II
Revidge Fold; 53.76090°N 2.48883°W	—	18th century	A stone house with a slate roof in two storeys. There is a central doorway and stair window. All the windows contain modern glazing.	II
2 and 4 France Street; 53.74664°N 2.48692°W	—	Late 18th century	A rendered house with stone dressings, in three storeys and five bays. The windows have wedge lintels, and some original sashes have survived. The central window in the top floor is blind.	II
40–46 King Street; 53.74659°N 2.48671°W	—	Late 18th century	A row of three brick shops with stone dressings and a slate roof in three storeys. The left shop is rendered and has two bays, and the others have three bays. In the ground floor are shop fronts, and above are windows with wedge lintels, some containing sashes. The left side has a pedimented gable containing a blind oculus.	II
1 Princes Street; 53.74619°N 2.48775°W	—	Late 18th century	A brick house on a stone plinth with stone dressings, in three storeys and with three bays. The central entrance is round-headed, and has an architrave with engaged columns, a broken pediment, and a fanlight. The windows are sashes.	II
39 and 41 King Street; 53.74616°N 2.48696°W	—	1778	A pair of brick houses with stone dressings in two storeys with basements. No. 39 is the larger, in five bays, with a pediment containing a round-headed window. The doorway is approached by a double flight of steps, and has a doorcase with three-quarter Ionic columns, a frieze, a cornice and a broken pediment. No. 41 has four bays, and a simpler Tuscan doorcase with a cornice. The windows are sashes, and between the houses is a carriage entrance.	II
St John the Evangelist's Church; 53.75065°N 2.48212°W	—	1787–89	The tower was added in 1802, the vestry in 1865, and the chancel in 1898–1900. The church is now redundant, and has been used as offices. The west tower has four stages; the lowest stage is rusticated, the bottom two stages are square, and the top two are octagonal, the lower of these containing Doric columns. Along the sides of the church are three three-light windows above which are lunettes, and at the east end is a Venetian window. Inside the church are three galleries.	II
51 and 53 James Street; 53.75097°N 2.48223°W	—	1791	A pair of brick houses with stone dressings in three storeys. Both houses have doorways approached by steps. No. 51 has a round-headed doorway. No. 53 has a doorcase with Ionic three-quarter columns, a frieze, a cornice, a rudimentary pediment, and a fanlight. Most of the windows are sashes.	II
Bank Cottage; 53.74891°N 2.47398°W		c. 1800	A stone cottage at Eanam Wharf on the Leeds and Liverpool Canal. On a sloping site, it has two storeys at the front and three at the rear. On the front are three bays containing a central porch flanked by two-storey mullioned bay windows with sashes.	II
Iron structure, Eanam Wharf; 53.74913°N 2.47215°W		c. 1800 (probable)	The iron structure, whose purpose is not known, stands at Eanam Wharf on the Leeds and Liverpool Canal. It consists of a large, tapering, cylindrical iron column on two hexagonal steps.	II
33 King Street; 53.74641°N 2.48629°W		1804 (probable)	A stuccoed building in three storeys in Georgian style. It has a front of nine bays, the outer two bays on each side projecting forward. The central doorcase is decorated with lions' masks and festoons, and has a round-headed doorway.	II
Hollin Bridge; 53.73486°N 2.49140°W		c. 1816–20	The bridge carries Hollin Bridge Street over the Leeds and Liverpool Canal. It is in sandstone, and consists of a single semi-elliptical arch with rusticated voussoirs and a keystone. The parapets have rounded coping, the abutments are curved, and at the ends are rectangular piers.	II
1–12 Mile End Row; 53.75288°N 2.50828°W	—	1817–30	A terrace of twelve stone workers' cottages in two storeys. Most have one window in each floor, and Nos. 4–9 have round-headed doorways with imposts, keystones, and solid fanlights.	II
1 and 5–29 West View Place; 53.75306°N 2.50785°W	—	1817–30	A terrace of 14 stone cottages with slate roofs. They are in two storeys, and each cottage has one window in each floor. The doorways are round-headed with imposts and keystones. Some cottages have cellars, with three steps leading up to the doorways.	II
2–28 West View Place; 53.75293°N 2.50801°W	—	1817–30	A terrace of 14 stone cottages with slate roofs. They are in two storeys, and each cottage has one window in each floor. The doorways are round-headed with imposts and keystones. Some cottages have cellars, with three steps leading up to the doorways.	II
Canal House; 53.74927°N 2.47345°W	—	c. 1820	The building is in stone on a sloping site. There are two storeys at the front and three at the rear. On the front is a small porch with a side entrance between Tuscan jambs. The windows are sashes.	II
Blackburn Cathedral; 53.7474°N 2.4813°W		1820–26	Originally a parish church by John Palmer, it became a cathedral in 1926. The church was damaged by fire in 1831 and repaired, it was extended at the east end from 1938, and in the 1960s a corona was added over the crossing. The cathedral is built in stone with a slate roof. It consists of a west tower, a nave with a clerestory, aisles, transepts, and a choir with side chapels. The original part of the cathedral is in Decorated style, and the later parts are in a simpler Gothic style. The corona is octagonal in Modernist style, surrounded by tall windows, and with pinnacles and a tall spire.	II*
Gateway, Blackburn Cathedral; 53.74762°N 2.48272°W	—	c. 1825	The gateway is at the northwest corner of the churchyard. It consists of a pair of octagonal stone piers surmounted by small spires. Between the piers are three elaborately decorated cast iron gates.	II
Beardwood Old Hall; 53.75927°N 2.51197°W	—	Early 19th century	A pebbledashed house with a slate roof in Gothic style, later used as a hospital. It has an L-shaped plan, and is in two storeys. There is a glazed porch, and the gables have pierced bargeboards.	II
Ewood Aqueduct; 53.73367°N 2.49239°W		Early 19th century	The aqueduct carries the Leeds and Liverpool Canal over Aqueduct Road. It is in sandstone and consists of a straight tunnel with a semicircular arch at each end. The arches have keystones, they are flanked by rectangular pilasters, and above the arches are plain friezes, moulded cornices, and parapets.	II
Office, Eanam Wharf; 53.74929°N 2.47309°W	—	Early 19th century	The office serving the Leeds and Liverpool Canal is in stone with a flagged roof. It is in a single storey and has curved ends and a cornice. The building contains mullioned windows with double sashes. At the rear is a square loading bay.	II
New Row Methodist Church; 53.72096°N 2.50250°W		1828	A pebbledashed Methodist church with a slate roof. It has a rectangular plan with two storeys and a symmetrical three-bay front. The central doorway is round headed, flanked by Tuscan jambs, and surmounted by a shaped pediment containing the date in the tympanum. The flanking windows also have shaped pediments.	II
Turner's Almshouses; 53.74310°N 2.49516°W		1833	A terrace of single-storey stone cottages with a hipped slate roof. There are six doors and six windows, all with Gothic-style arches. At the top is a cornice and a central pediment. The stone garden walls are included in the listing.	II
Warehouses, Eanam Wharf; 53.74906°N 2.47331°W		Early to mid 19th century	A row of five adjoining stone warehouses with flagged roofs adjacent to the Leeds and Liverpool Canal. They have two storeys, and contain small-paned windows, hoists, three-light mullioned windows, and a large segmental-arched entrance. On the canal side are large cantilevered canopies on cast iron columns.	II
1–21 Richmond Terrace; 53.75074°N 2.48492°W		c. 1835	A terrace of 21 brick houses with stone dressings in two storeys. At the top is a moulded cornice and a plain parapet. Each house has one window in the ground floor and two above. All the houses have Ionic doorcases with friezes and cornices, varying in detail. Above the doorway of No. 11 is a pediment containing a coat of arms.	II
22–27 Richmond Terrace; 53.75063°N 2.48357°W	—	c. 1835	A terrace of six brick houses with stone dressings in two storeys. They have doorcases with Tuscan pilasters and cornices, and windows with stone lintels and sills. At the top is a moulded cornice and a plain parapet.	II
St Mark's Church; 53.74390°N 2.50835°W		1836–38	A stone church with slate roofs designed by Edmund Sharpe in Romanesque style. Transepts and a northwest vestry were added in about 1880. The church consists of a nave with a west porch, asymmetrical transepts, the south transept containing a porch, a tower over the chancel, and a shallow sanctuary. The tower has a square base, the upper part is octagonal and contains two tiers of round-headed gabled windows, and on the top is a short spire.	II*
Holy Trinity Church; 53.75110°N 2.47446°W		1837–46	The church was a Commissioners' church designed by Edmund Sharpe in Gothic Revival style. It became redundant in 1981 and passed into the care of the Churches Conservation Trust. The church consists of a nave with a clerestory, aisles, transepts, a chancel, and a west tower. The tower is in three stages with pinnacles and a plain parapet.	II
20 Church Street; 53.74764°N 2.48251°W		c. 1840	A stone house in Classical style, with two storeys and a square plan. It has corner pilasters, a cornice, and a panelled parapet. In the ground floor is a shop front, and above are sash windows in moulded frames.	II
28 and 30 Church Street; 53.74772°N 2.48214°W	—	c. 1840	A stone house in Classical style, with two storeys and a square plan. It has corner pilasters, a cornice, and a panelled parapet. In the ground floor is a shop front, and above are sash windows in moulded frames.	II
Barclays Bank; 53.74775°N 2.48208°W	—	c. 1840	The bank is in stone, it is in Classical style with a square plan, and has two storeys. There are corner pilasters. a cornice, and a panelled parapet. In the upper floor are sash windows in moulded frames.	II
34 Darwen Street; 53.74652°N 2.48281°W	—	c. 1850	A brick office building with sandstone dressings and a Welsh slate roof. It has two storeys and a principal entrance front of three bays. There is a central doorway with a semicircular fanlight, and paired round-headed windows containing sashes.	II
2–12 Springfield Street; 53.74035°N 2.50592°W	—	Mid 19th century (probable)	A terrace of six stone cottages with a slate roof in two storeys. The doorways are plain, and there are eight windows in the upper floor, and six in the ground floor, some of which are sashes.	II
7–11 Springfield Street; 53.74055°N 2.50590°W	—	Mid 19th century (probable)	A terrace of three stone cottages with a slate roof in two storeys. The doorways are plain, and there is one window in each floor of each cottage.	II
Stone setts, Springfield Street; 53.74040°N 2.50603°W	—	Mid 19th century (probable)	The stone setts are laid along the road between the cottages.	II
Griffin Lodge; 53.74009°N 2.50391°W	—	Mid 19th century	A house later used as offices, in brick on a stone plinth with stone dressings and a slate roof. The main block has two storeys and three bays. There is a central porch with a round-headed entrance, and the windows are sashes with architraves. The house also has large angle pilasters, a frieze and a cornice. To the right are later extensions.	II
Town Hall; 53.74982°N 2.48405°W		1852–56	The town hall was designed by J. Patterson in Italianate style. It is in stone, with two storeys, an attic and a basement, and has a front of seven bays, the outer bays projecting forward. The ground floor is rusticated and contains arched openings, and in the upper floor are round-arched windows, Corinthian columns, and a balustraded parapet. Above these is a frieze containing decorative panels, and another balustrade. Inside is a domed hall, and a council chamber with pilasters and coffered walls.	II
South Entrance, Corporation Park; 53.75235°N 2.49194°W		1855	The entrance consists of a triumphal arch flanked by lodges. It is in stone with a central large arch and has two tiers of smaller arches at the sides. At the top is a cornice and a pediment decorated with shields, scrolls, and a bird finial. The lodges contain pairs of round-arched windows.	II
Cotton Exchange; 53.74996°N 2.48517°W		1862–65	The cotton exchange was designed by W. H. Brackspear in High Victorian Gothic style with mainly Perpendicular features, but was never completed as planned. It is in stone with a slate roof. The building has an octagonal entrance bay with two gabled entrances containing tracery, above which are three-light windows, gargoyles, and an octagonal roof. Along the side to the right are five canted crenellated bay windows with mullions and transoms.	II
3 Princes Street; 53.74624°N 2.48787°W	—	Mid to late 19th century	A brick house with stone dressings in three storeys with five bays. The main doorway in the fourth bay has a semicircular arch with moulded imposts, a keystone, and a fanlight; there is a similar blocked doorway in the first bay. The windows are sashes.	II
Drill Hall; 53.74370°N 2.48526°W		1870	The drill hall was built for the Rifle Volunteer Corps, and later incorporated and modified the adjacent skating rink to the east. The original part is in sandstone with hipped slate roofs, and is in Gothic style. The hall has a sloping plinth, corner buttresses, a dentilled cornice, and is in two storeys and five bays. The central bay projects forward, it contains an arched entrance and is gabled. The windows on the front include triple lancets.	II
Lloyds Bank; 53.74754°N 2.48332°W		c. 1870 (possible)	The back was built for the Cunliffe and Brooks Banks on a corner site. It is in brick and has a square plan. The entrance is angled across the corner with iron gates under a round arch. Along the sides are linked round-arched windows divided by Composite columns, three on Darwen Street, and two on Church Street. At the top of the building is a cornice on modillions, and a balustraded parapet.	II
42–46 Preston New Road; 53.75215°N 2.48862°W	—	Victorian	A terrace of three brick houses with stone dressings and a hipped slate roof in two storeys with attics. The central house is larger and set forward, the doorways have round heads, and the windows are sashes, also with round heads. There are four half-dormers.	II
25–31A Victoria Street, 10 James Street; 53.75072°N 2.48271°W	—	Victorian	A row of houses on a corner site in Georgian style. They are in brick with stone dressings, and have two storeys. There are two shop fronts on the corner house. The doorways have half-columns with palm leaf capitals, friezes, cornices, and fanlights. The windows in the upper floor are sashes with stone sills and lintels.	II
Former barn, Fernhurst Court; 53.72448°N 2.48940°W	—	Victorian	A large stone barn on a sloping site that has been converted into residential use. It contains quoins and round pitch holes. Originally there were shippons at the lower end and the barn was at the upper end.	II
Lewis Textile Museum; 53.75006°N 2.48426°W		Victorian	The building is in brick and in the style of a palazzo, with three storeys and three bays. The ground floor contains a bow window, and a doorway with a segmental head and a fanlight. Above, the windows are round-headed with sashes, those in the middle floor having iron balconies. At the top of the building is a projecting cornice on brackets.	II
Blackburn Museum and Art Gallery; 53.75044°N 2.48415°W		1872–74	A museum, library and art gallery designed by Thomas Collcutt in Gothic Revival style with Arts and Crafts features. It was enlarged later in the 19th century, and altered in the following century. It is in sandstone with a slate roof, and has an L-shaped plan on a corner site, two storeys, and a symmetrical five-bay front. There is a central arched entrance containing ornate gates, above which is a carved panel. There are further panels on both fronts with relief carvings by G. W. Seale.	II
Daisyfield signal box 53.75439°N 2.46638°W		1873	The signal box was built for the Lancashire and Yorkshire Railway, and is a rare survival of a Saxby and Farmer Type 6 signal box. It is in brick with a Welsh slate hipped roof in two storeys. There are two entrances on the south side, and the western face has continuous glazing.	II
Blackburn railway station 53.74659°N 2.47954°W		1886–88	The station was built for the Lancashire and Yorkshire Railway in Italianate style. It is brick with sandstone dressings, and with a slate roof. The booking hall is in two storeys with four bays, flanked by single-storey wings, and with a canopy at the front carried on cast iron columns. At the top of the building, in the centre, is a clock in a decorative upstand.	II
College of Technology and Design; 53.74888°N 2.48740°W		1888–89	The college was designed by Smith, Woodhouse and Wiloughby in free French Renaissance style. It is in brick with decoration in yellow terracotta, and it has a slate roof. The college has two storeys, and attic and a basement, and a symmetrical front of nine bays. Its features include a central entrance with flanking turrets and a balcony, canted bay windows with balustraded balconies, ornamental terracotta arcading, and gables, the centre one shaped, and the outer ones triangular.	II
National Westminster Bank; 53.74881°N 2.48424°W	—	1891	The bank was designed by Mills and Murgatroyd in Neoclassical style. It stands on a corner site, has an L-shaped plan, is built in sandstone with a Welsh slate roof, and has two storeys. There are three bays on King William Street and seven on New Market Street, with an angled bay on the corner. The bays are divided by pilasters, and at the top of the building is a frieze and cornice under a balustraded parapet.	II
St Silas' Church; 53.75160°N 2.50731°W		1894–1900	The church was designed by Paley and Austin in free Perpendicular style, and the tower was added in 1913–14. It is built in sandstone with a slate roof, and consists of a nave, aisles, a southwest porch, transepts, a chancel with vestries, and a west tower. The tower is in three stages, and has buttresses, a southwest polygonal stair turret, pinnacles, and a pierced parapet.	II*
St Alban's Church; 53.75301°N 2.47475°W		1898–1901	A Roman Catholic church designed by Edward Goldie in Decorated style, built in Longridge sandstone with a slate roof. It consists of a nave with a clerestory, north and south aisles, a west narthex and baptistry, north and south transepts, a sanctuary with chapels, and a west tower. The four-stage tower has stepped buttresses, a three-sided stair turret, a gabled entrance with a carved Crucifixion in the tympanum, a west window containing Geometrical tracery and a parapet with corner pinnacles.	II
Conservatory, Corporation Park; 53.75528°N 2.49812°W		1902	The conservatory is in iron and glass on a stone base. The central part is rectangular and is richly ornamented. It is gabled with a clock in the pediment, and from the centre rises a louvred chimney. There are wings on each sides with curved ends, and a glazed lean-to verandah.	II
Imperial Mill; 53.75312°N 2.45627°W		1902	A spinning mill by Sidney Stott in brick with three and four storeys. It has a long rectangular plan, with a flat roof, and water and stair towers at the ends surmounted by tall elongated copper domes. An engine house with round arched window projects to the south.	II
Railings and statue, Blackburn Cathedral; 53.74709°N 2.48058°W		1905	The railings are in cast iron and border the east side of the churchyard of the cathedral. At intervals there are square stone piers carrying iron lamp holders. In the centre is a curved stone balustrade around a statue of Queen Victoria, which was carved by Bertram Mackennal.	II
Central Police Station and Court House; 53.74985°N 2.48617°W		1912–21	The police station and court house were designed by Briggs, Wolstenholme and Thornley in Classical style. They are in sandstone with slate roofs, and have a rectangular plan on a corner site. The building is in two and three storeys over a basement. Features include a giant Ionic colonnade, a Tuscan porch, and a parapet expanding to frame sculptures of allegorical figures.	II
King George's Hall; 53.74906°N 2.48611°W		1913–21	A public hall by Briggs, Wolstenholme and Thornley in Classical style. It is in sandstone with a slate roof, and has a large rectangular plan with three storeys and an attic. The ground floor is rusticated, and at the entrance front are three arched openings, above which is a portico with four pairs of Corinthian columns. Along the right side are eleven bays, the central five bays containing tall windows with Tuscan architraves and bull's eyes windows above, and the outer bays having windows flanked by Corinthian half-columns.	II
Former fire station and wall 53.74294°N 2.48698°W		1915–21	The former fire station is in red brick with sandstone dressings and slate roofs. The main block has two storeys and six bays. Between the bays in the ground floor are engaged Tuscan columns over which is a band with decorated panels and a Greek frieze. The upper floor contains windows with sandstone surrounds and roundels in the corners, and at the top is an entablature and a parapet with panels alternating with openwork. On each side are lower two-storey pavilions with hipped roofs, each with the middle bay projecting, pedimented, and containing a doorway. At the rear the buildings include a single-storey wing, containing the former the stables and ambulance room, the latter with three engaged columns, and a drill tower, 80 feet (24 m) high, with six stages, the top stage in Baroque style. Also at the rear is the former drill yard that is surrounded on three sides by a high red brick wall with rounded copings.	II
Telephone kiosk 53.74869°N 2.48537°W	—	1935	A K6 type telephone kiosk, designed by Giles Gilbert Scott. Constructed in cast iron with a square plan and a dome, it has three unperforated crowns in the top panels.	II
Entrance, Griffin Park; 53.74055°N 2.50571°W	—	Undated	The entrance consists of a pair of stone gates and flanking walls at the end of Springfield Street.	II
