= Cotton Exchange =

Cotton Exchange may refer to:

- Bremen Cotton Exchange (Bremer Baumwollbörse)
- Karachi Cotton Exchange
- Liverpool Cotton Exchange Building
- Royal Exchange, Manchester, the United Kingdom's principal cotton exchange from 1729 until 1968
- Blackburn Cotton Exchange Building
- New Orleans Cotton Exchange
- New York Cotton Exchange
- Mobile Cotton Exchange
- Memphis Cotton Exchange
- Savannah Cotton Exchange
- The Seam, online cotton exchange

== See also ==
- Cotton Exchange Building (disambiguation)
