= Listed buildings in Darwen =

Darwen is a town in Lancashire, England. It contains 33 buildings that are recorded in the National Heritage List for England as designated listed buildings. Of these, three are listed at Grade II*, the middle grade, and the others are at Grade II, the lowest grade. Until the coming of the Industrial Revolution, Darwen was mainly agricultural, and the older listed buildings consist of farms, churches and a cottage. The later listed buildings vary considerably, and include more churches, and houses, memorials, bridges, a mill and its chimney, tram shelters, and the entrance to a railway tunnel.

== Key ==
Grade	Criteria
II*	Particularly important buildings of more than special interest
II	Buildings of national importance and special interest

== Buildings ==
Name and location	Photograph	Date	Notes	Grade
Whitehall; 53.68044°N 2.46192°W	—	1557	Originally one house, altered in the 17th and 18th centuries, and later divided into three dwellings. It is in sandstone with roofs of stone-slate and some slate. The building has an L-shaped plan and is in two and three storeys, with windows of varying types, some of which have been altered.	II
Middle Moss and Higher Moss Farmhouse; 53.71293°N 2.48517°W	—	Early 17th century (probable)	Originally a single farmhouse, it was extended and converted into two dwellings in the 18th century. The building is in sandstone with a stone-slate roof, and is in two storeys. The houses have two-storey porches, and windows that vary, some of which are mullioned and other are casements. Inside, there is a large inglenook, and some timber-framing.	II
Bury Fold; 53.68306°N 2.46658°W	—	1675	A farmhouse, later divided into two houses, in sandstone with tiled roofs. It has two storeys and a four-bay front that contains a 2 1/2-storey porch. The windows vary, some are mullioned, and one is a five-light stepped window. On the left side is a modern two-storey lean-to extension.	II
Barn, Earcroft Farm; 53.71717°N 2.48276°W	—	1688	The barn is in sandstone with a stone-slate roof, and has a front of four bays, the first bay projecting forward. It contains doorways, windows and a cart entrance.	II
Lower Chapel; 53.70383°N 2.46450°W		1719	A Congregational church in domestic vernacular style, built in sandstone with a slate roof. It has a rectangular plan with outbuildings, and is in two storeys. The entry front has a single-story gabled porch, three windows, and four datestones, these indicating the years in which the chapel was altered or extended. The windows on the sides are mullioned, and on the corners are quoins.	II
St James' Church; 53.70320°N 2.46243°W	—	1722	The church was restored in 1852–53, altered in about 1878 and, apart from the west front, rebuilt in 1937–40. It is in stone with a slate roof, and is in Renaissance with Gothic details. The church consists of a nave and a chancel at right angles with a semicircular apse. On the west front is an entrance flanked by Doric half-columns. Above this is a gable with a bellcote and containing three five-light windows. The front is flanked by pilasters, and there are more pilasters along the sides of the church between round-headed windows.	II
Sunnyhurst Cottage; 53.70237°N 2.48846°W		18th century	A cottage, now renamed Dennis Gillibrand Cottage and used as a visitor centre, in built of sandstone with a stone-slate roof. It has two storeys and a cellar, and a symmetrical front with a central doorway. There are two casement windows on each floor. On the right side is a lean-to garage.	II
Bog Bank Farmhouse; 53.71632°N 2.50134°W	—	1756	A sandstone farmhouse with a stone-slate roof, it has two storeys and three bays. The doorway is in the south gable end, where there is a window in each floor, a blocked attic opening. and a datestone. Most of the windows are later top-hung casements.	II
Low Hill House; 53.68437°N 2.46440°W		c. 1812	A house built for Samuel Crompton, subsequently enlarged for Eccles Shorrock, and later divided into flats. It is in sandstone with a slate roof. The original part has two storeys and a symmetrical three-bay front. This has a central Tuscan doorcase with an open pediment and a fanlight. The flanking wings also have two storeys and are higher; they contain three-light pedimented windows.	II
St Peter's Church; 53.69552°N 2.46465°W		1827–29	A Commissioners' church by Thomas Rickman and Henry Hutchinson in Perpendicular style. It is in sandstone with a slate roof, and consists of nave with a clerestory, aisles, porches, a north vestry, an apsidal east end, and a west tower. The tower contains a west doorway, and has a battlemented parapet with eight flat-topped pinnacles.	II*
Belgrave Chapel; 53.69420°N 2.46783°W		1847	Originally a Congregational church by Edward Walters, it has since been divided into flats. The chapel is in sandstone with roofs partly of slate but mainly of corrugated iron, and is in Early English style. It consists of a nave, north porch, aisles, an east transept, and a chancel. Rising from the junction of the porch and nave is an openwork arcaded screen with three gablets set between octagonal turrets with pinnacles.	II
Entrance to Sough Tunnel; 53.68303°N 2.44468°W		1847–48	The tunnel was built on the Blackburn, Darwen and Bolton Railway line. The northern portal is built in gritstone and is in medieval style. It has a horseshoe-shaped arch with rusticated voussoirs, and a battlemented parapet. The portal is flanked by machicolated turrets.	II
Old Chapel, Wetherspoons; 53.69597°N 2.46523°W		1864–66	Originally a Methodist chapel, the building was designed by Ernest Bates, and is in stone with a hipped slate roof. The building has a rectangular plan in two storeys, and is in Classical style. The entrance front has a portico over which is an entablature with a dentilled and modillioned cornice; this is carried by Corinthian half-columns and pilasters. Above the central doorway is a Venetian window, and flanking it are two tiers of windows with keystones and archivolts.	II
Woodlands; 53.67971°N 2.46487°W	—	1860s	A large house in red brick with blue brick diapering, stone dressings and slate roofs in Jacobean style. It has a central block and two unequal wings with shaped gables, and is in 2 1/2 storeys and a basement. Linking the gables is a moulded cornice with a balustrade and urn finials.	II
India Mill; 53.6915°N 2.4647°W		1867	A cotton spinning mill designed by Ernest Bates for Eccles Shorrock, it is in sandstone and has a flat roof. The mill has a rectangular plan measuring 330 feet (100.6 m) by 99 feet (30.2 m), it is in six storeys, and it has towers at the comers and in the centre of both sides. Projecting from it on both sides are engine houses, the one on the south side being in Classical style, and including Venetian style windows.	II
Chimney, India Mill; 53.69111°N 2.46531°W		1867	The chimney is 300 feet (91.4 m) high, it has a square section, and is in the style of an Italian campanile. It is in red brick on a stone base, with stone dressings, and decoration in blue and yellow brick. There are two levels of blind arcading and, near the top, is a cornice with a stone balustrade and urn finials. The chimney is linked to an office and the engine house.	II*
Drinking fountain 53.67744°N 2.46375°W	—	Late 19th century (probable)	The drinking fountain is in Whitehall Park, and is in cast iron, It stands on a pedestal on octagonal stone steps, and consists of a bowl and a fountain under an elaborate canopy that is surmounted by a cupola.	II
Greenhouse, Woodlands; 53.67936°N 2.46498°W	—	Late 19th century	The greenhouse has a brick base, and consists of a long range with an octagonal bay in the centre with doors at the front. On top of this is a glazed hipped roof with an octagonal lantern and a weathervane.	II
St Cuthbert's Church; 53.70521°N 2.47798°W		1875–78	The church was designed by Paley and Austin in Gothic style, and the tower was added in 1907–08 when the nave was lengthened. It is built in yellow sandstone with pink bands and has a slate roof. The church consists of a nave, aisles, a chancel with a north vestry and a south chapel, and a west tower. The tower has a rectangular plan and is in three stages. It has a west entrance, a polygonal stair tower, clock faces in the top stage, and a saddleback roof.	II
Jubilee Tower; 53.68965°N 2.48798°W		1897	The tower was built partly to commemorate the diamond jubilee of Queen Victoria, and partly to celebrate the success of a campaign to open the moors to the general public. It is in sandstone and consists of an octagonal tower 86 feet (26.2 m) high. Around the base is a circular crenellated loggia with Tudor arches. On the tower are lancet windows, and at the top is a cast iron lantern with a domed top and a weathervane. Inside the tower is a spiral staircase leading to a deck over the loggia, and then to the summit of the tower.	II
Boer War Memorial; 53.69467°N 2.46740°W		1902	A memorial to the local men who died in the Second Boer War. It consists of a stone pedestal on a plinth on which there is the bronze statue of a roaring lion with its paw resting on a ball. On the memorial are bronze plaques with inscriptions, including the names of those who died.	II
Tram shelters 53.69467°N 2.46743°W		1902	A pair of octagonal stone shelters in a single storey, and in Baroque style. They have large round-headed windows, separated by Ionic half-columns, and above them is a balustraded parapet with scroll consoles and ball finials. The associated iron railings with stone piers are included in the listing.	II
Stone bridge, Sunnyhurst Wood; 53.70218°N 2.48834°W		1903	The bridge carries a track across a brook, and is in medieval style. It is in sandstone, and consists of a single Tudor arch, and has cutwaters that rise to form pedestrian refuges. It contains two inscribed tablets.	II
Chadwick Lychgate, Sunnyhurst Wood; 53.69746°N 2.48703°W		1903	The lych gate forms one of the entrances to the wood. It has a sandstone base carrying a timber superstructure. On both sides are four bays, and the roof is tiled with gables at each end. The gables contain mock timber framing, arched braces, and decorative bargeboards. The east gable has a carved inscription and floral motifs. The gateway contains double five-bar timber gates.	II
Potter Gateway, Sunnyhurst Wood; 53.70214°N 2.48646°W		1903	The gateway is in the form of a lych gate at one of the entrances to the wood. The building has an octagonal plan, and has a sandstone wall with two entrances. On the wall are eight timber Tuscan columns carrying a pyramidal tiled roof with a domed plaster ceiling. On the top is a carved stone finial.	II
Lightbown Drinking Fountain, Sunnyhurst Wood; 53.70236°N 2.48778°W		1907	The drinking fountain was restored in 1982. It stands on a circular base of four steps, and is in sandstone. The fountain consists of a deep cylindrical basin with circular seating on three sides, and a tapering obelisk containing the fountain head and an inscription. The top of the obelisk has been truncated and replaced by a later stone finial.	II
Darwen Library and Theatre; 53.69673°N 2.46594°W		1908	The building was funded by Andrew Carnegie, and originally consisted of a library and a lecture room, the lecture room later being converted into a theatre. It stands on a curved sloping corner site, and is built in Yorkshire stone with a slate roof. The entrance hall on the corner is octagonal, it is surmounted by a cupola with an octagonal drum and a copper-clad dome, and approached by a bridge over a deep channel. Behind the entrance hall are three storeys, the basement forming the theatre, which has a separate entrance.	II
Olde English Tea House and gate piers, Sunnyhurst Wood; 53.70220°N 2.48916°W		1911–12	The building, known as the Kiosk, is in sandstone and has a stone slate roof with finials. It has two storeys and five bays, with a central main entrance and side gabled entrances with verandahs. The main entrance is flanked by two-storey canted bay windows with pyramidal roofs and finials. All the windows have timber mullions. To the north and south of the building are pairs of square gate piers with moulded caps.	II
Carved bridge, Sunnyhurst Wood; 53.70184°N 2.48965°W		1912	The bridge carries a track across a brook, and is in Jacobean style. It is in sandstone, and consists of a single segmental arch with voussoirs, carved keystones, and balustrades. The curved approach wall has balusters, panelled pedestals, and ball finials.	II
Greenway Shelter, Sunnyhurst Wood; 53.69993°N 2.49171°W		1912	The shelter, known as the bandstand, has an octagonal plan. Eight sandstone columns with Tuscan-style columns support a conical roof with timber and iron beams and a stone slate covering. Around the shelter is a stone kerb, now flush with the ground.	II
War Memorial, Bold Venture Park; 53.69225°N 2.47200°W		1920	The war memorial in Bold Venture Park was designed by L. F. Roslyn. It consists of a square stone base and plinth on three steps carrying a tall tapering pillar. Standing on the pillar is a bronze statue of an angel with wings outspread. On front of the pillar is an inscribed panel, and on the other sides are bronze panels with depictions in low relief of a soldier, a sailor and a nurse.	II*
Park Road Methodist Church War Memorial; 53.67828°N 2.45825°W		Undated	The war memorial is near the entrance to Darwen Cemetery, and has been moved there from its original position by the church. It is in stone, and consists of a pillar surmounted by a cornice with a curved head and egg and dart moulding, and stands on a two-stepped base. The memorial is carved with a wreath and a serpent, and carries an inscription and the names of the church members who lost their lives in the First World War.	II
War Memorial, Lower Darwen; 53.72386°N 2.46314°W		Undated	The war memorial is adjacent to St James' Church. It consists of a tapering white granite pedestal on a low plinth. On the pedestal is a cooper statue of a soldier, standing with his head bowed. Around the pedestal is a copper ribbon and a wreath, and on the sides are inscriptions in bronze lettering. Around the memorial is a low cast iron railing with pine cone finials.	II
