= Cotton Exchange Building =

Cotton Exchange Building may refer to:

in the United Kingdom

- Liverpool Cotton Exchange Building, England
- Manchester Royal Exchange the United Kingdom's principal cotton exchange from 1729 until 1968
- Blackburn Cotton Exchange Building

in the United States

- Augusta Cotton Exchange Building, Augusta, Georgia
- New Orleans Cotton Exchange Building, New Orleans, Louisiana
- New York Cotton Exchange, New York, New York
- Cotton-Exchange Building (Oklahoma City, Oklahoma), listed on the National Register of Historic Places (NRHP)
- Houston Cotton Exchange Building, Houston, Texas
- Old Cotton Exchange Building, Nacogdoches, Texas, listed on the NRHP

== See also ==
- Cotton Exchange (disambiguation)
