= PCCA =

PCCA may refer to:

- Pine Castle Christian Academy, a private school in Pine Castle, Florida
- Pinellas County Center for the Arts, a magnet school in Pinellas County, Florida
- Plains Cotton Cooperative Association
- Professional Compounding Centers of America, a pharmaceutical organization
- Propionyl Coenzyme A carboxylase, alpha polypeptide
- Portable Computer and Communications Association
- Partners in Confronting Collective Atrocities
- Pewter Collectors Club of America, Inc., a non-profit educational group
