= St Cuthbert's Church, Darwen =

Coordinates: 53.7052°N 2.4781°W

St Cuthbert's, Darwen
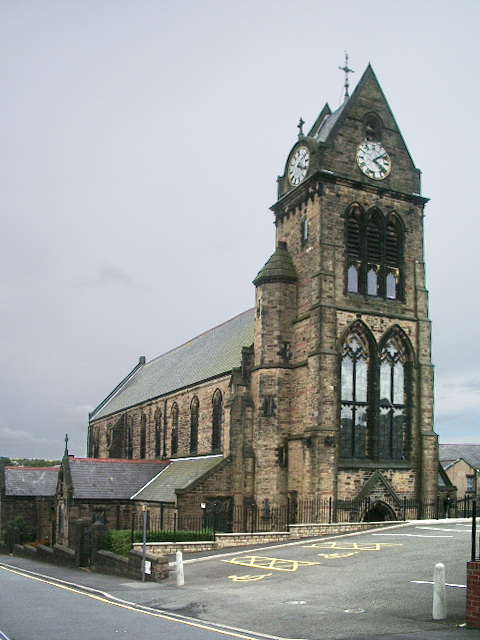
- St Cuthbert's Church in 2008

- Location in Blackburn with Darwen
- OS grid reference: SD 68537 23302
- Location: Darwen, Lancashire
- Country: England
- Denomination: Anglican

Architecture
- Functional status: Active
- Heritage designation: Grade II
- Architect: Paley and Austin

Specifications
- Materials: Sandstone

Administration
- Province: York
- Diocese: Blackburn
- Archdeaconry: Blackburn
- Deanery: Blackburn with Darwen
- Parish: Darwen with Tockholes

Clergy
- Vicar: The Rev’d Nicholas E. Davis Claire Marsden

St Cuthbert's Church is an Anglican church in the English market town of Darwen, Lancashire. It is an active parish church in the Diocese of Blackburn and the archdeaconry of Blackburn. The church was built 1875–1878 by Paley and Austin. It has been designated a Grade II listed building by English Heritage.

== History and administration ==
St Cuthbert's was built 1875–1878 to a design by Lancaster architecture firm Paley and Austin. A tower was added 1907–1908. English Heritage designated the church a Grade II listed building on 27 September 1984. The Grade II designation—the lowest of the three grades—is for buildings that are "nationally important and of special interest". An active church in the Church of England, St Cuthbert's is part of the diocese of Blackburn, which is in the Province of York. It is in the archdeaconry of Blackburn and the Deanery of Blackburn with Darwen. Both the parish and benefice are called Darwen St Cuthbert with Tockholes St Stephen.

== Architecture ==
=== Exterior ===
St Cuthbert's is built in yellow sandstone with slate roofs. There is a tower at the west end, a nave with aisles, a chancel and a vestry. There are transepts to the north and south of the nave. The rectangular tower has three stages and a gabled roof. There are clock faces high on each side of the tower. At the north-east corner of the tower, where it joins the nave, there is a polygonal turret. The west wall of the tower has a pair of large windows with transoms and tracery; there are also belfry windows on that wall.

The windows of the clerestoried nave have two lights and cinqufoil heads. There is a five-light east window in the chancel with tracery.

=== Interior ===
Internally, the nave is of four bays. The arcade has octagonal columns. In the chancel there is a marble reredos designed by Powell. The stained glass in the church includes a war memorial by Morris & Co. and an image of Saint Chad and Saint Cuthbert by Lancaster-based firm Shrigley and Hunt.

In 1877 the organ was brought from the parish church at Kendal; the casework is by Bernard Smith.

== See also ==
- Listed buildings in Darwen
- List of ecclesiastical works by Paley and Austin
