= Darwen Cemetery =

Cemetery in Lancashire, England

Coordinates: 53.6787°N 2.4600°W

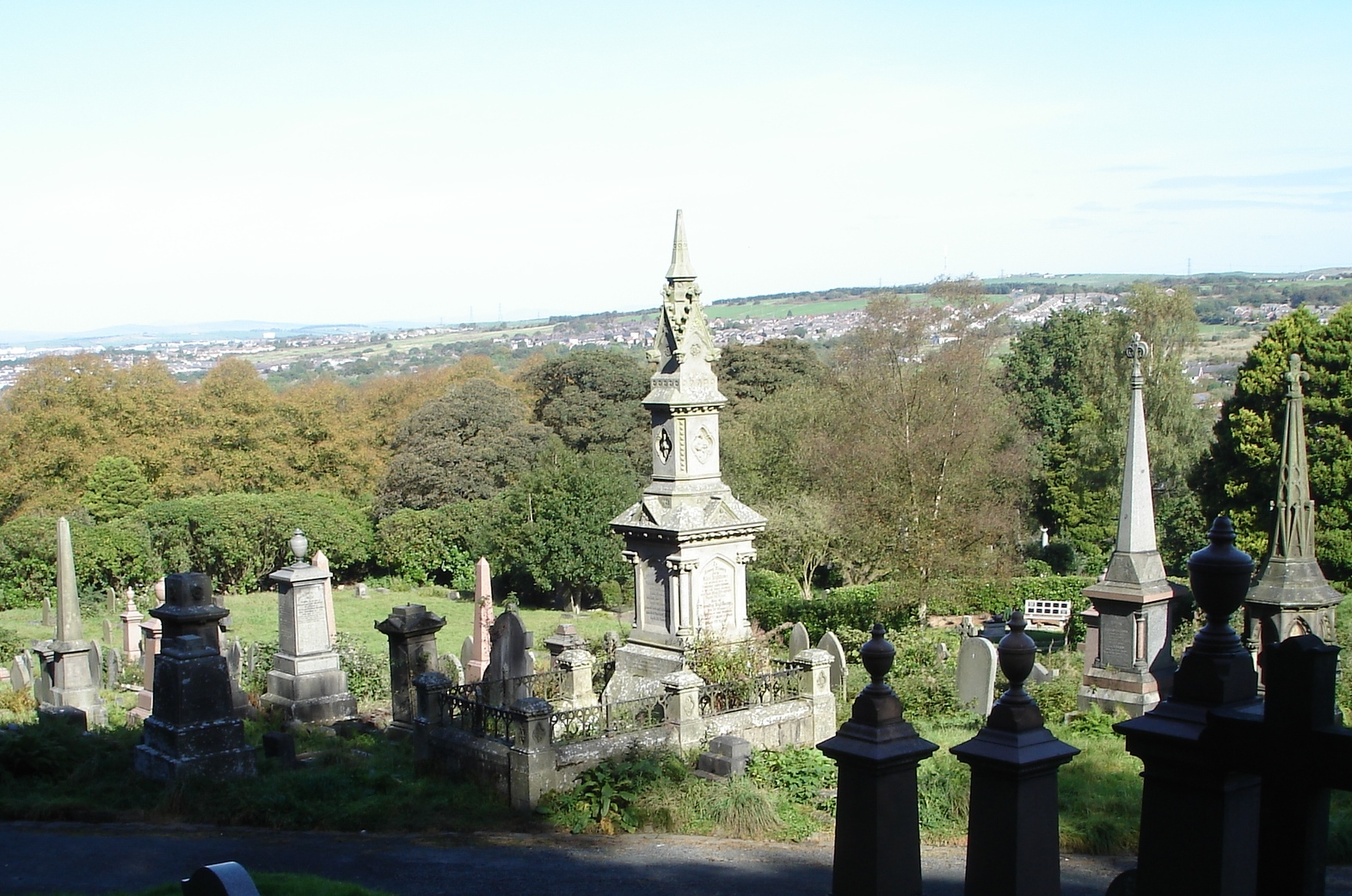
Darwen Cemetery looking north

Darwen Cemetery is a public cemetery in the town of Darwen, Lancashire, England, which lies on both sides of Bolton Road with views across Darwen to the hills beyond. A Cross of Sacrifice erected to burials of First World War service personnel stands by the entrance of the older part.

== History ==
When space for burials in local churchyards became limited the local Board of Health acquired land on the western side of Bolton Road to provide a public burial site. The plot was divided into separate Church of England, Roman Catholic and Non-Conformist sections, each provided with their own Mortuary Chapels and opened as a cemetery in June 1861. In 1876 it was enlarged to cover 20 acres and by the end of the Second World War it was again expanded by the acquisition of further land on the other side of Bolton Road, now known as the Darwen East Cemetery. This too was expanded in the 1970s.

The Non-Conformist chapel was demolished in the 1970s and the other two in the 1980s. The cemetery has undergone considerable restoration in recent years by the Friends of Darwen Cemetery, who unveiled a World War One monument on 1 July 2018.

== Notable interments ==
- Sir Henry Leslie Huntington, 2nd Baronet Huntington – Wallpaper manufacturer (Walpamur)
- Eccles Shorrock – Cotton manufacturer, responsible for building India Mill.
- Martha Jane Bury – Campaigner for women's rights
- The cemetery contains 100 Commonwealth service war graves, 76 from the First World War and 24 from the Second and 1 Ministry of Defence grave
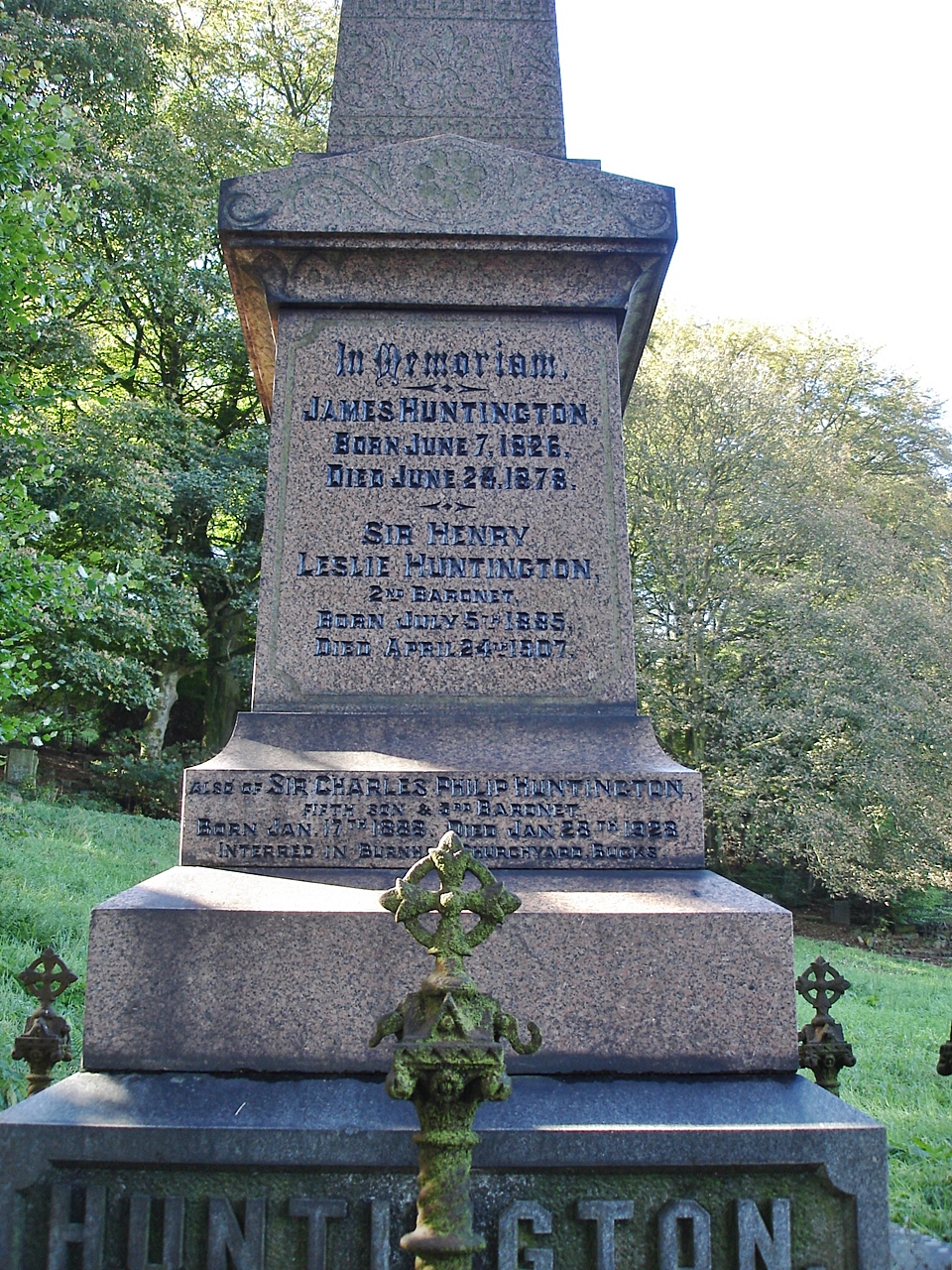
Sir Henry Huntington memorial

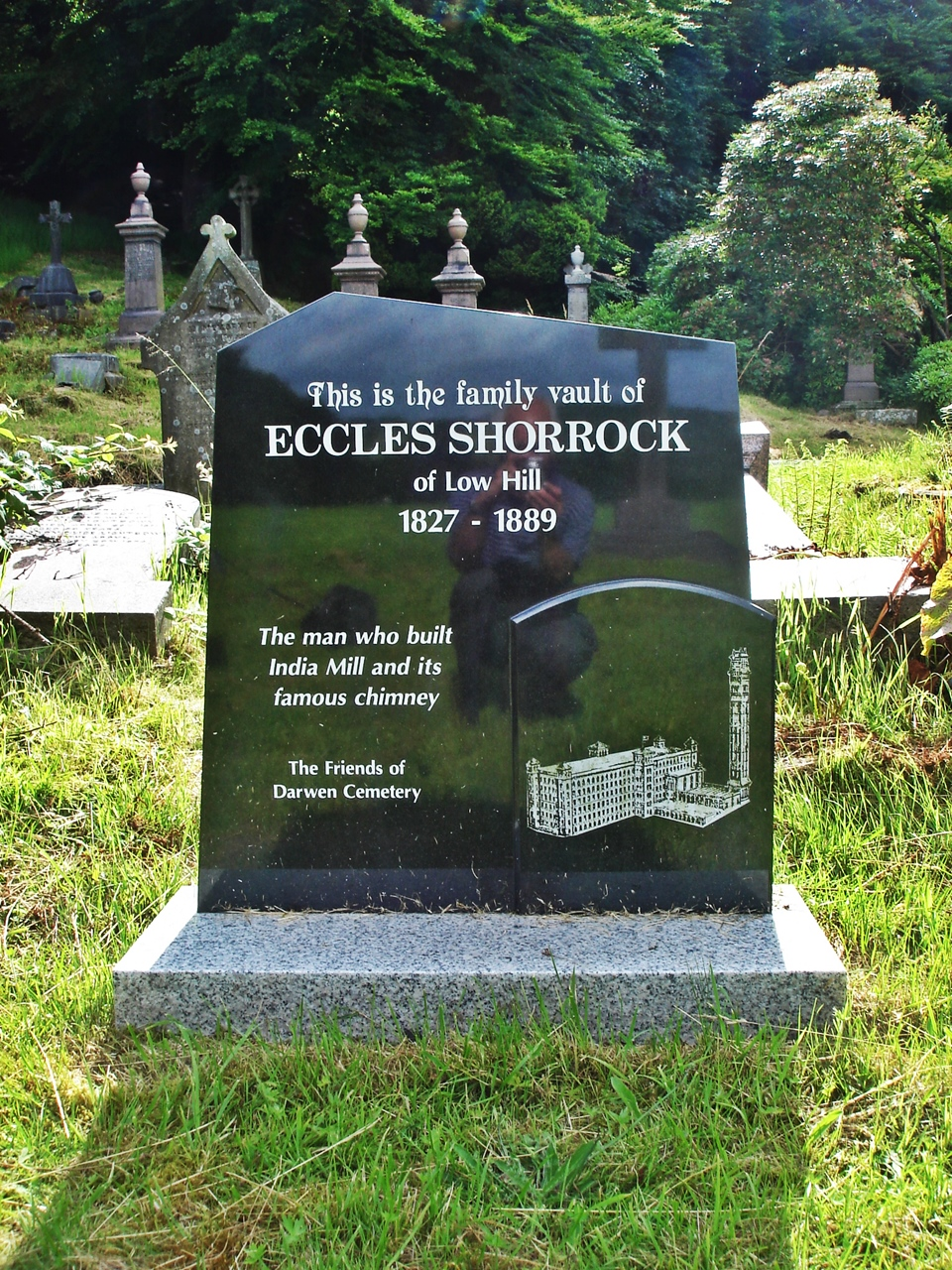
Eccles Shorrock memorial

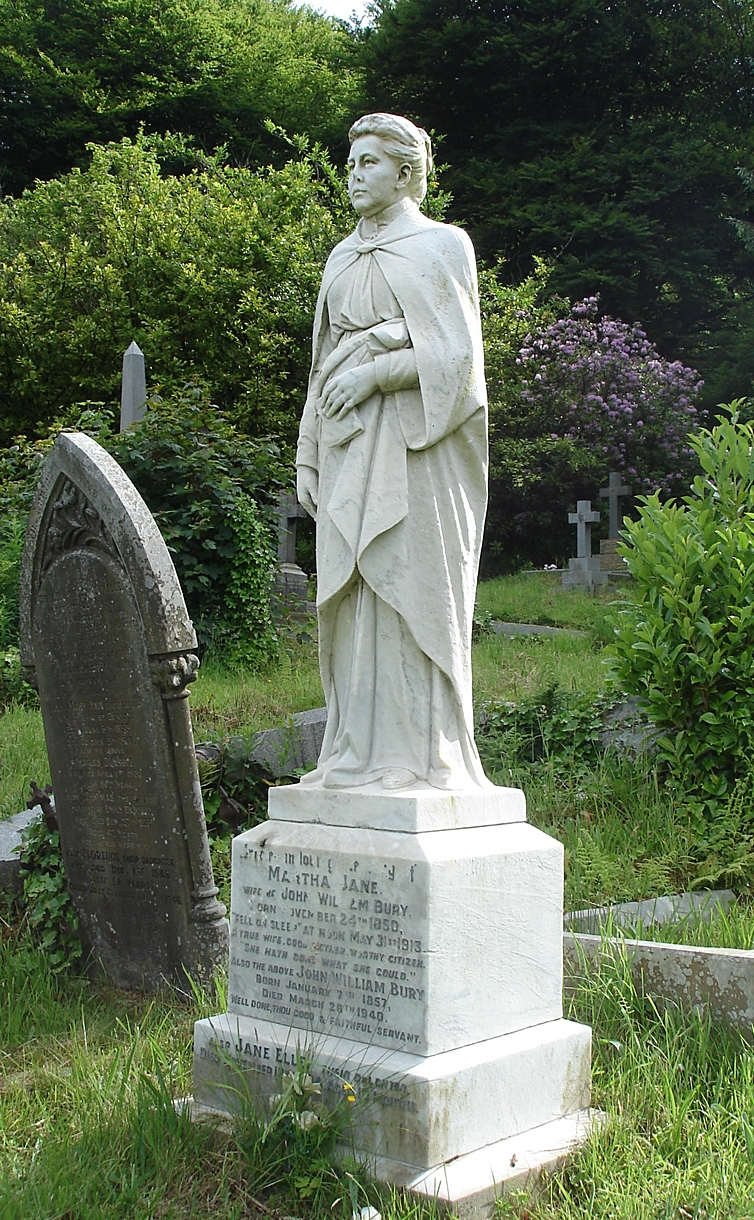
Martha Jane Bury memorial

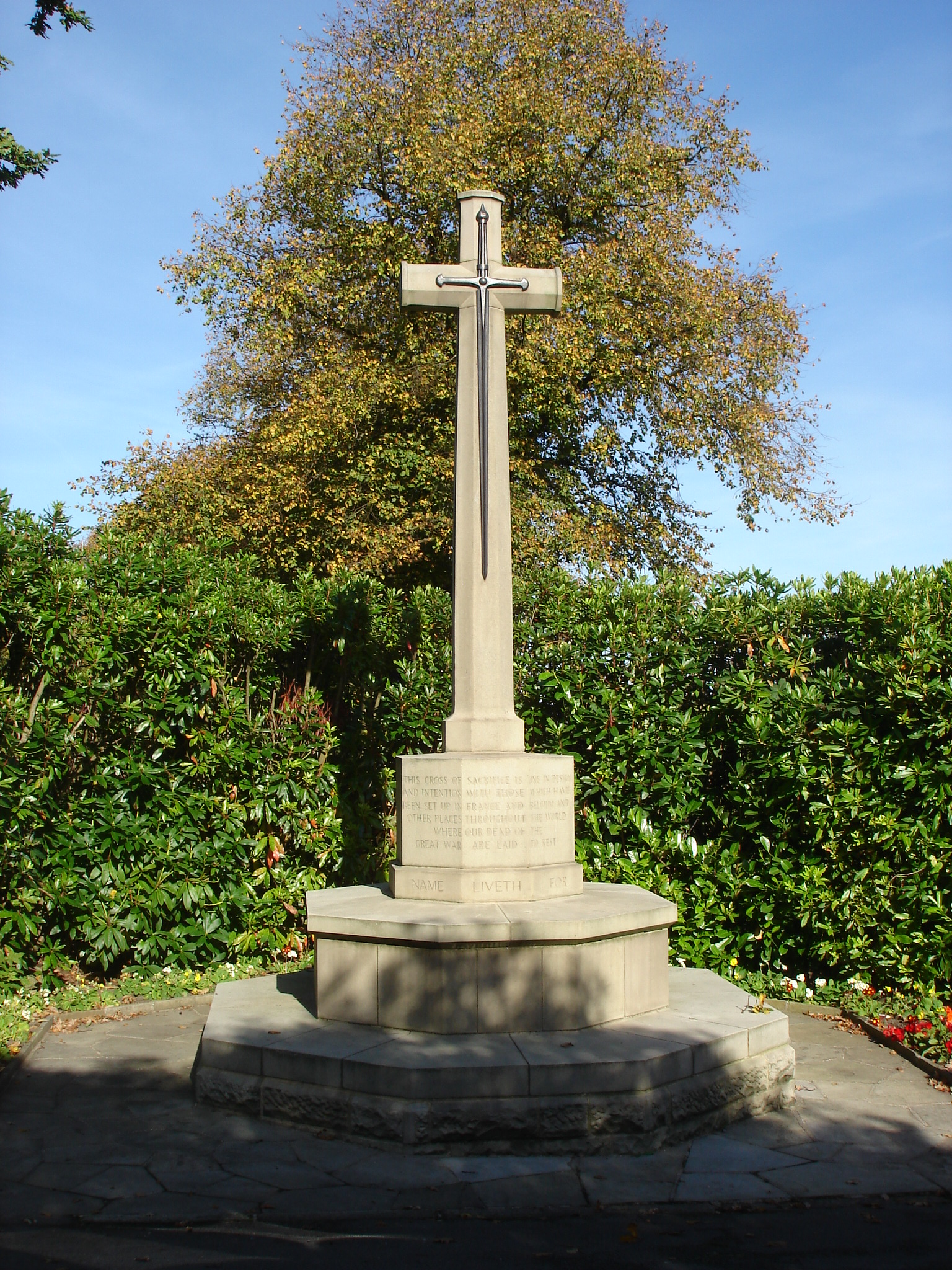
Cross of Sacrifice
