= Martha Jane Bury =

English co-operator (1850–1913)

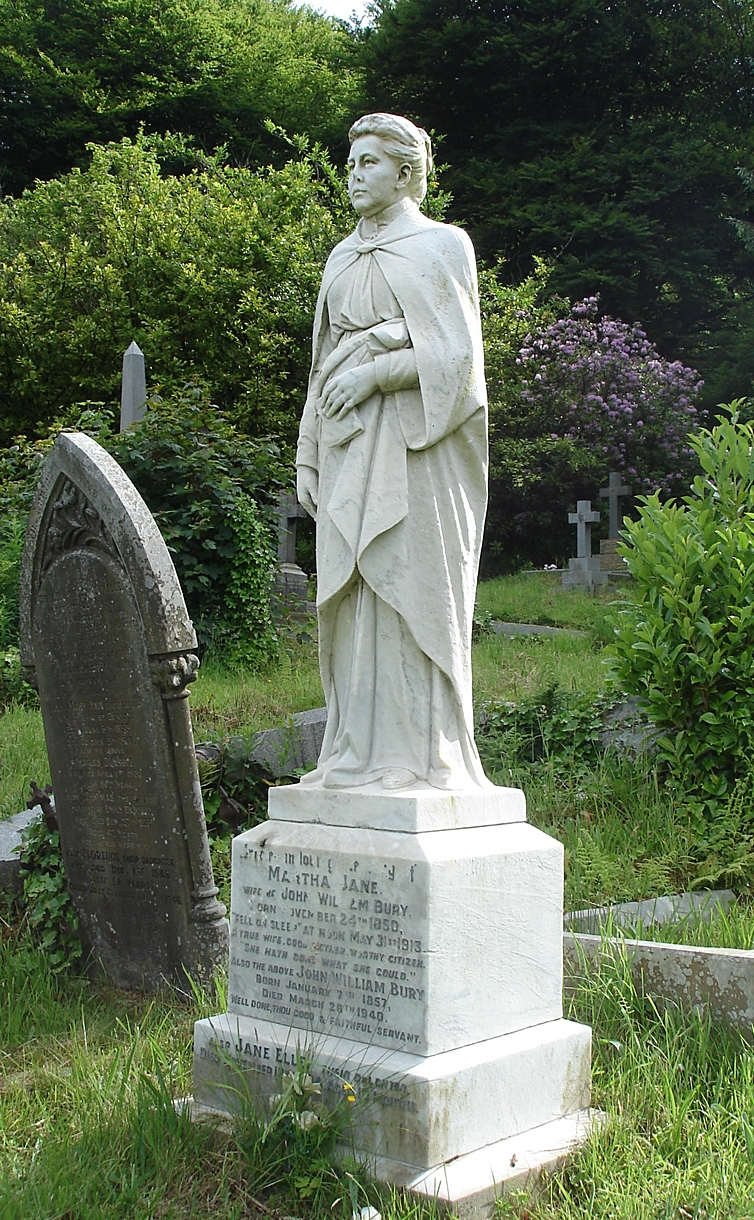
- Bury's monument in Darwen Cemetery
- Born: Martha Jane Walmsley; 24 November 1850; Blackburn, Lancashire, England
- Died: 31 May 1913 (aged 62); Darwen, Lancashire, England
- Movement: Co-operative
- Spouse: John William Bury (m. 1882)
- Children: 5

Martha Jane Bury (née Walmsley: 24 November 1850 – 31 May 1913) was an English suffragist and co-operative organiser active in the Co-operative Women's Guild.

== Life ==
Bury was born in Blackburn, Lancashire, England to George Walmsley, a headmaster, and Jane Walmsley (née Pearson). Her father died when she was two, forcing her mother to not only work as a draper, but also to take in lodgers. After some basic schooling at the age of eleven, Bury started working in a textile mill. Her education was improved by her own efforts assisted by night school. In 1868 she began working in a cotton mill in Darwen, Lancashire, and she bought herself a share in the Darwen Industrial Co-operative Society.

She ceased paid work in 1892 after her husband was promoted. Her family had joined the middle classes but she remembered her upbringing and she devoted her energies to the co-operative society. By the following year she was the society's secretary. She later became the President and under her leadership the Darwen society became the largest co-operative in the UK. Bury was a keen suffragist.

She was a keen supporter of the Women's Co-operative Guild and she served three terms on the committee and she was elected as its president in three different years. She crossed swords with the Guild's General secretary Margaret Llewelyn Davies over the approach to women's suffrage and the reform of the divorce laws.

== Private life ==
In 1882 she married John William Bury, a weaver with whom she had five children.

== Death and legacy ==
Bury died in 1913 and a statue was created as her memorial. The statue is known as the "White Lady" in time it fell and it was restored by a local mason and the friends of Darwen cemetery in 2010.
