= The Seam =

American software company

- Type: Private company
- Industry: Software
- Founded: November 2000; 25 years ago
- Headquarters: Memphis, United States
- Key people: Mark Pryor, CEO
- Services: Commodities exchange
- Website: theseam.com

The Seam is an American software company that designs and operates platforms for commodities trading, particularly in cotton. It was launched in December 2000 by four cotton companies and is based in Memphis, Tennessee. Though specializing in cotton trading, its platforms have added other commodities such as dairy and peanuts over time.

== History ==
In 2000, Allenberg Cotton, Cargill (then Hohenberg Brothers), Dunavant Enterprises, and the Plains Cotton Cooperative Association (PCCA) joined to create an online marketplace for electronic cotton trading. The Seam was officially established as a company on November 6, and launched in December 2000. Forbes described it as "the world's first online, neutral trading exchange for cotton".

The company subsequently transitioned to cloud-based systems for its trading, processing more than $7 billion in sales through its cloud-based platforms. Mark Pryor, a specialist in banking software architecture, was named the CEO in 2015; he had previously spent eleven years developing The Seam's technology as Vice President, Information Technology. That same year, the China National Cotton Exchange announced that it would begin buying cotton on The Seam.

In January 2017, IBM CEO Ginni Rometty announced that IBM and The Seam were collaborating to create a blockchain for cotton trading, "a secure, distributed, and immutable digital ledger".
