= Blackburn Cotton Exchange Building =

Grade II listed building in Blackburn, England

Cotton Exchange
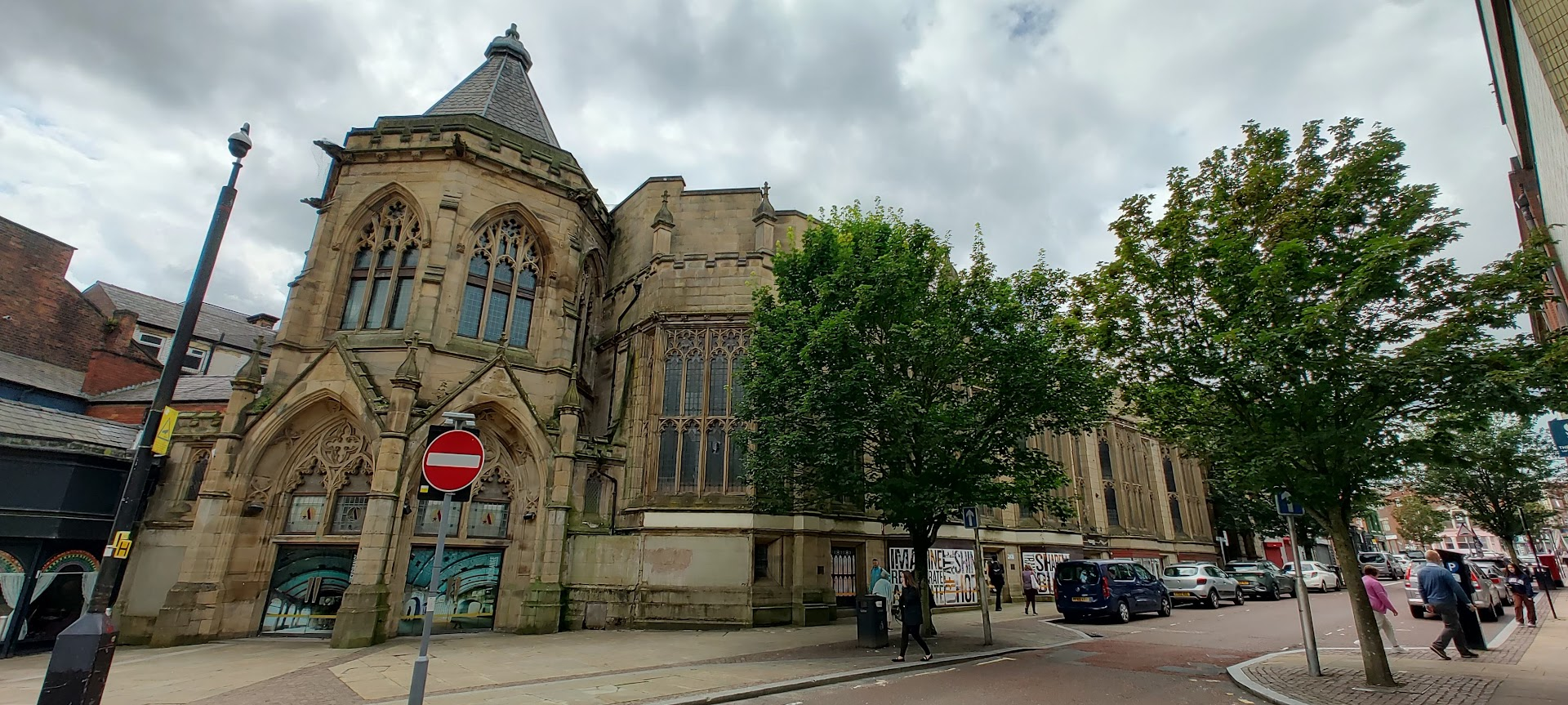
- Exterior of the Cotton Exchange

General information
- Architectural style: High Victorian Gothic

Listed Building – Grade II
- Official name: The Cotton Exchange
- Designated: 2 September 1985
- Reference no.: 1222896
- Location: Blackburn, England
- Coordinates: 53°45′00″N 2°29′06″W
- Construction started: 1863
- Completed: 1865; 161 years ago
- Client: Blackburn Exchange Company Ltd

Design and construction
- Architect: William Brakspear

Website
- https://exchangeblackburn.org.uk/

The Cotton Exchange is a grade II listed building in Blackburn, England. It is located on King William Street, opposite the Town Hall.

The building was used briefly as a cotton exchange, then a performance hall and cinema, before closing in 2005. It was bought by the Re:Source charity in 2015, and is currently used by community groups and as an event space.

== History ==
=== Background ===
The cotton industry grew in the 1800s as a result of trade from South America to the port of Liverpool and the development of machinery for cotton spinning and weaving. Blackburn benefited from this development, with a fast growth of cotton mills, weaving and industrial development.

Local traders bought and sold cotton for use in their mills, and as the number of traders grew, there came a desire for a dedicated exchange and to cement Blackburn's place in the cotton industry.

=== Northgate path ===
Textiles were a small cottage industry for some time, with families spinning and weaving fabrics by hand in their home and trading locally. Early reports exist of a broad footpath off Northgate in Blackburn known as the "Cotton Exchange", where local handloom workers would meet to buy and sell thread and woven cloth.

=== Bull Inn and Market Place ===
Cotton trade later took place at the Bull Inn, Church Street. For many years, traders used this and the surrounding street as a place for trading. As the number of traders and volume of trade increased, those involved decided they would prefer a dedicated building.

In 1846, land on the corner of Church Street and Darwen Street was bought from the estate of John Fleming for this purpose and a competition was held inviting architects to submit plans for the exchange. Thirty entries were displayed at the Assembly Room, Heaton Street, and judged by the architect Charles Robert Cockerell. The design submitted by William Hayward Brakspear and Thomas Dickson of Manchester was chosen as the winning design.

The economic situation at the time meant plans were put on hold until November 1849. Fundraising attempts were then restarted in 1850, with adverts placed in the local press, and subscribers included local firms such as Sir W Feilden, Bart., Son and Co, Messrs William Henry Hornby and Co, and Eccles Shorrock. The committee aimed to raise £20,000 to fund the building by inviting members of the public to buy shares of £10 each.

However, the committee were unable to raise sufficient funds and the project was cancelled. The site was put up for auction in 1851.

=== Town Hall ===
Blackburn was incorporated in 1851, and the Town Hall completed in October 1856.

In January 1857, the exchange committee voted to leave the Bull Inn and move to the newly built Town Hall from January 1857, taking up rooms on the south side of the building for a news room and exchange.

By 1859, the exchange group had grown such that their meetings filled both the dedicated rooms and Town Hall vestibule, and there were concerns that the Council would soon need the rooms for municipal purposes. At this point, the exchange committee again considered a new purpose built building.

== Exchange building ==
By January 1860, the committee had again decided that a dedicated exchange building should be created. Multiple sites were investigated, including the earlier proposed site at the junction of Church Street and Darwen Street, a plot at the junction of Ainsworth Street and Victoria Street, a plot by the Police Station, and a plot opposite the Town Hall. The site opposite the Town Hall was chosen as the most appropriate, and a budget of £12,000 was set to be raised through the sale of shares to the public.

The chosen site at King William Street was then in use by the Catholic Brethren, who were building a Catholic Hall at the site. The exchange committee agreed that this should be bought and demolished to make way for the exchange building. Adjacent to this site was the Feilden's Arms public house. Initially, the committee also planned to buy and demolish this, though it was kept and later renamed the Exchange Hotel.

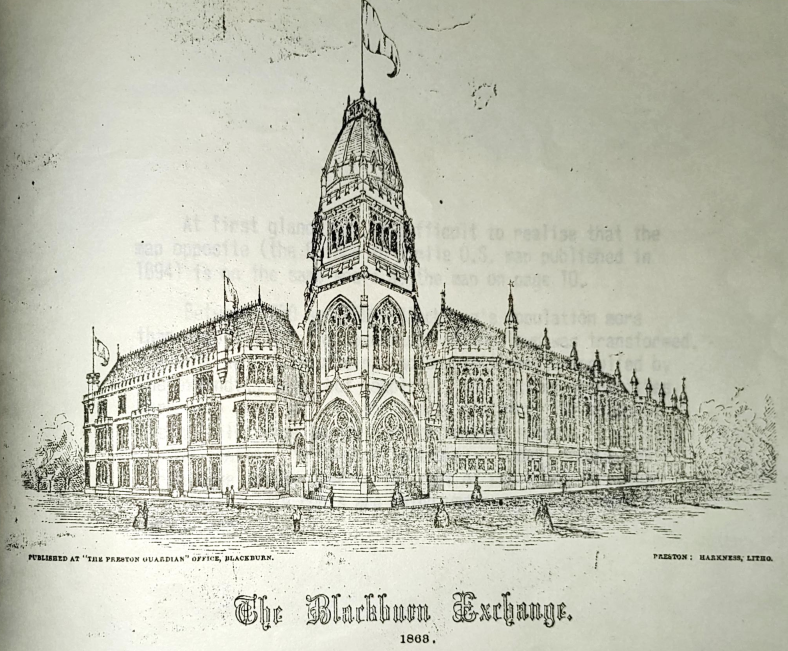
The original design for the Cotton Exchange, Blackburn, designed by William Hayward Brakspear

In April 1860, a competition was held to invite designs for the new building. The winning design, named Suum cuique, was submitted by William Hayward Brakspear, winner of the previous competition in 1846. Brakspear's Victorian Gothic design featured a central tower with two wings holding the exchange sales room, a news room and supporting rooms. Construction was to begin in 1861, and a holding company, the Exchange Company Blackburn Ltd, was founded to manage the site and sell shares to raise funds.

The start of construction was delayed however until 1862 due to workers strikes and excessively high costs quoted by builders. The Exchange Company eventually instructed foundation work to be carried out though in readiness for the building construction to begin.

In 1863, work began on the building. Fundraising for the building had failed to reach the expected amount, in part due to the Lancashire Cotton Famine having an impact on local businesses, and so the building plans were amended so that only the central tower and one wing would now be built, with the option to build the second wing at a later date.

=== Laying of the foundation stone ===
On 10 March 1863, the building's foundation stone was laid by Mayor James Sturdy as part of a day's celebrations for the wedding of Prince Albert and Princess Alexandra. The event took place during a period of economic downturn, in which many were struggling with poverty. Under these circumstances, the event was both ceremonial and a call for hope for the future prosperity of the town in which the Cotton Exchange would have a central role.

The Town Hall Square was reported to have been decorated with flags and banners, with viewing platforms for town dignitaries including businessmen, landowners, and politicians. Local workers and artillery men also attended the event

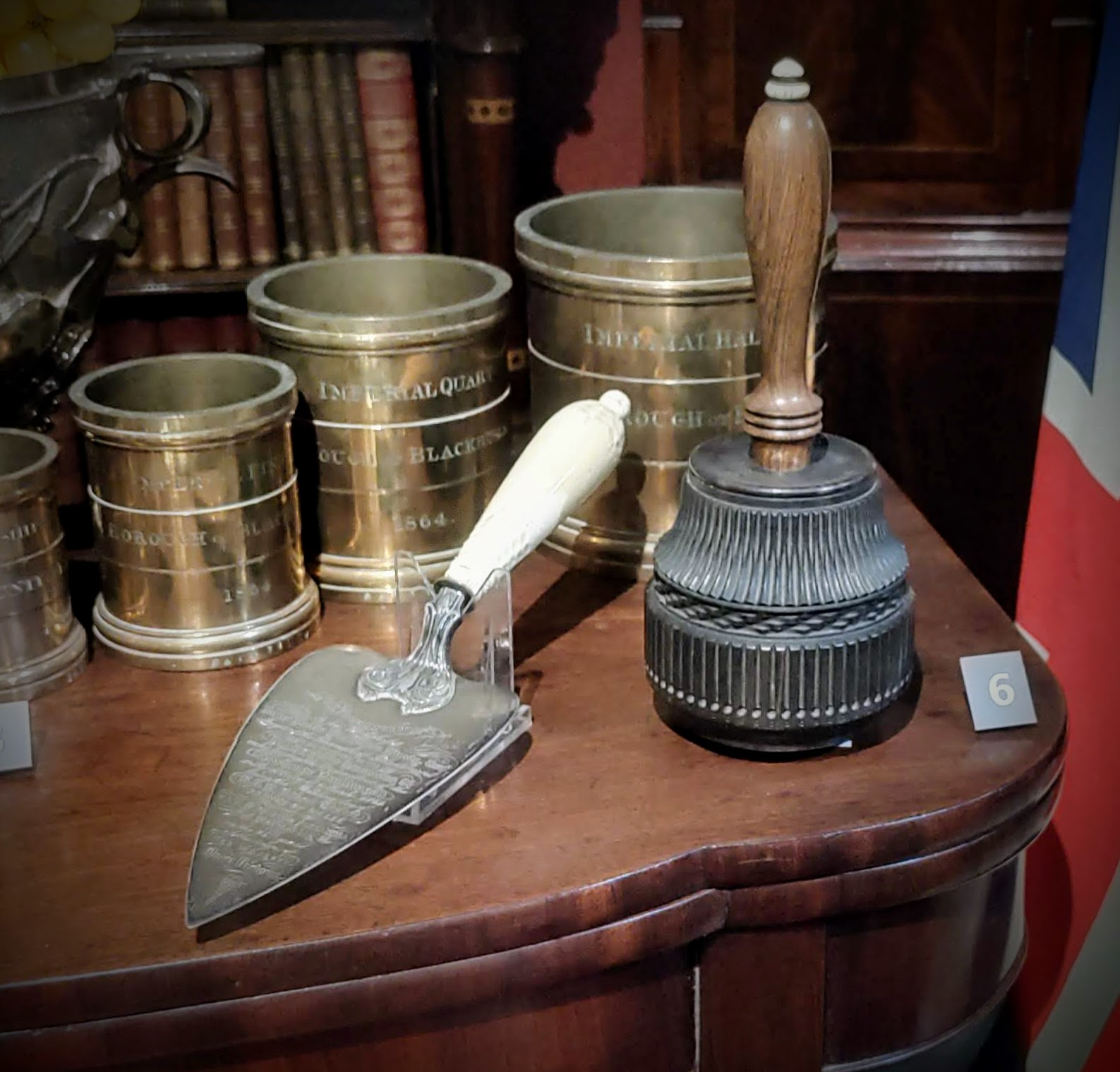
The ceremonial trowel and mallet gifted to and used by the Mayor in the laying of the foundation stone of the Cotton Exchange, Blackburn

For the ceremony, Mayor James Sturdy was gifted an engraved silver trowel and an ebony mallet to carry out the actions of setting and levelling the foundation stone. While doing this, a time capsule containing coins, newspapers and other documents was placed into a recess in the foundation stone before the stone was lowered into place and covered. The trowel and mallet are now on display at Blackburn Museum and Art Gallery.

Speeches were made by directors of the Exchange Company Ltd and Mayor James Sturdy, followed by feu de joie from rifle volunteers and cheers from the crowd.

We all hope that the gloom which overhangs the present, and the cloud that obscures the future, will soon uplift and roll away; that Blackburn will soon again experience a renewal of the trade which, coupled with the energy of its inhabitants, has earned for it the character of one of the most enterprising and prosperous of the boroughs of Lancashire; and on the return of these better times will be better understood than at present the importance of the Exchange Building we are now assembled to inaugurate.

— William Stones, Director, Exchange Company Ltd,

A painting of the laying of the foundation stone was made by Vladimir Sherwood. The painting shows the event with the Town Hall in the background, and a square filled with watchers. Dignitaries shown include Mayor James Sturdy, land owner Joseph Feilden and his family, and directors of the Exchange Company including Joseph Harrison, Stones, Dickinson and Hutchinson. The painting is now on display at Blackburn Museum and Art Gallery.

=== Opening ===
The Cotton Exchange officially opened on 3 May 1865. The opening itself was a quiet event with no celebration, reportedly due to the inability to arrange for a suitable dignitary to attend. However, a musical concert was held, conducted by David Johnson, featuring vocals from Madame Parepa performing I Dreamt I Dwelt in Marble Halls, and music from Mendelssohn's violin concerto.

== Blackburn Exchange Building Company – 1850 ==
The first company to be registered relating to the building of an Exchange was the Blackburn Exchange Building Company, which was registered with the Joint Stock Companies Registry Office on 20 April 1850.

The founding members were listed as:

- Sir William Feilden Baronet
- William Henry Hornby
- William Kenworthy
- Robert Hopwood (the elder)
- Robert Hopwood (the younger)
- Montague Joseph Feilden
- Eccles Shorrock
- Thomas Eccles
- Richard Eccles
- James Forrest
- Thomas Bolton
- Henry Hall

This company was later dissolved when the plans to build an Exchange were cancelled.

== Exchange Committee and the Blackburn Exchange Company Ltd – 1860 ==
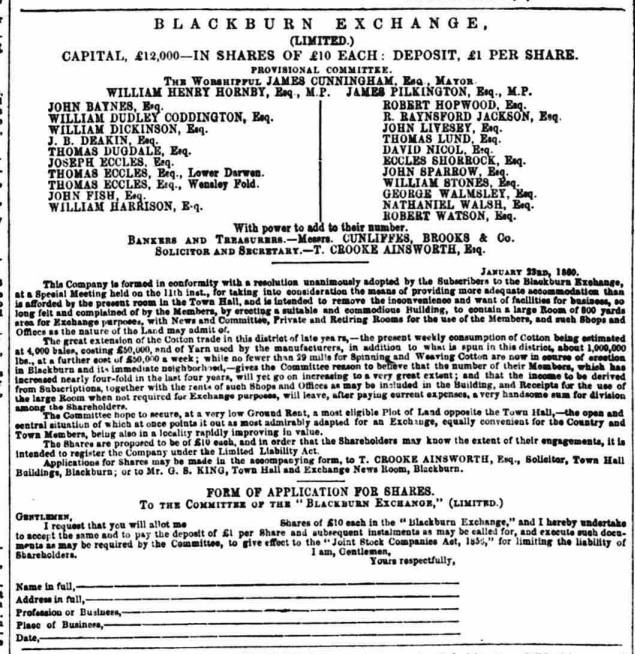
An advert inviting buyers for shares in Blackburn Exchange Company Ltd to fund the Cotton Exchange building

The Exchange Committee was formed by the subscribers to the cotton exchange group in January 1860 with the purpose of overseeing the work required to build the Cotton Exchange. The committee comprised the following local business men and dignitaries:

- James Cunningham, Mayor
- William Henry Hornby, MP
- James Pilkington, MP
- John Baynes
- William Dudley Coddington
- William Dickinson
- J B Deakin
- Thomas Dugdale
- Joseph Eccles
- Thomas Eccles (Lower Darwen)
- Thomas Eccles (Wensley Fold)
- John Fish
- William Harrison
- Robert Hopwood
- R Raynsford Jackson
- John Livesey
- Thomas Lund
- David Nicol
- Eccles Shorrock
- John Sparrow
- William Stones
- George Walmsley
- Nathaniel Walsh
- Robert Watson

To support the groups work, Cunliffes, Brooks & Co were appointed bankers and treasurers, and T Crooke Ainsworth the solicitor and secretary.

The committee subsequently founded Exchange Company Ltd as a holding business for legal purposes and fund raising for the new building.

The Exchange Company Blackburn Ltd was wound up in June 1899, and the building put up for sale.

== Repurpose ==
By the 1880s, the cotton industry in Blackburn was suffering a decline, largely due to the Cotton Famine, and the Manchester Cotton Exchange established itself as the primary trading venue. The reduced activity led to the Cotton Exchange being repurposed. While it had already been used for performances, the building was refurbished to make it a more appropriate space with a larger stage area and dressing rooms. The building became host to a variety of musical, theatrical and other performances.

The building was converted into a cinema in 1918 and named the Exchange Picture Hall. Through the 20th century, it was operated by various companies and known under several names including Essoldo and Apollo 5.

== Closure ==
The building was being used by the Apollo 5 cinema from 1992 to 2005. In 2002 a rival cinema opened on the edge of Blackburn town centre. This led to a reduction in trade at the Apollo 5 and its closure in 2005.

By 2007, the Hurstwood Group had bought the building with a view to redevelop it and find a new occupier. The interior cinema fittings were removed, and efforts were made to find new tenants, but this was unsuccessful, and the building remained unused and deteriorating for many years.

== Current usage ==
The Re:Source charity bought the Cotton Exchange in 2015 to refurbish the building and bring it back into use.

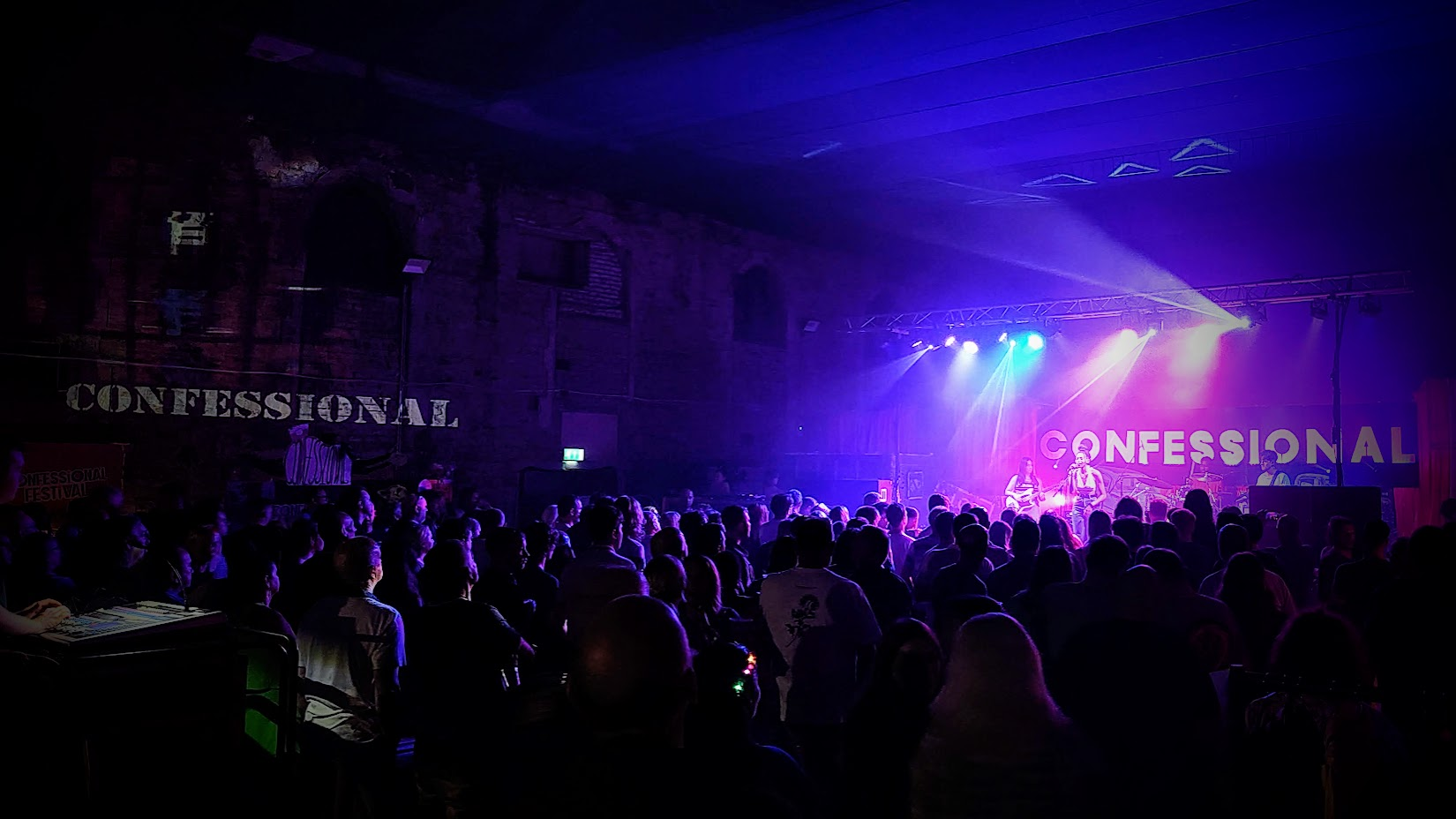
The Confessional Festival 2023 at the Exchange

The building has been host to events including the National Festival of Making, adidas Spezial Exhibition, and the Confessional Music and Arts Festival.

In 2024, £1.5m government funding was granted to allow initial works to the entrance tower to take place, commencing in November 2024.
