= Blackburn Town Hall =

Municipal building in Blackburn, Lancashire, England

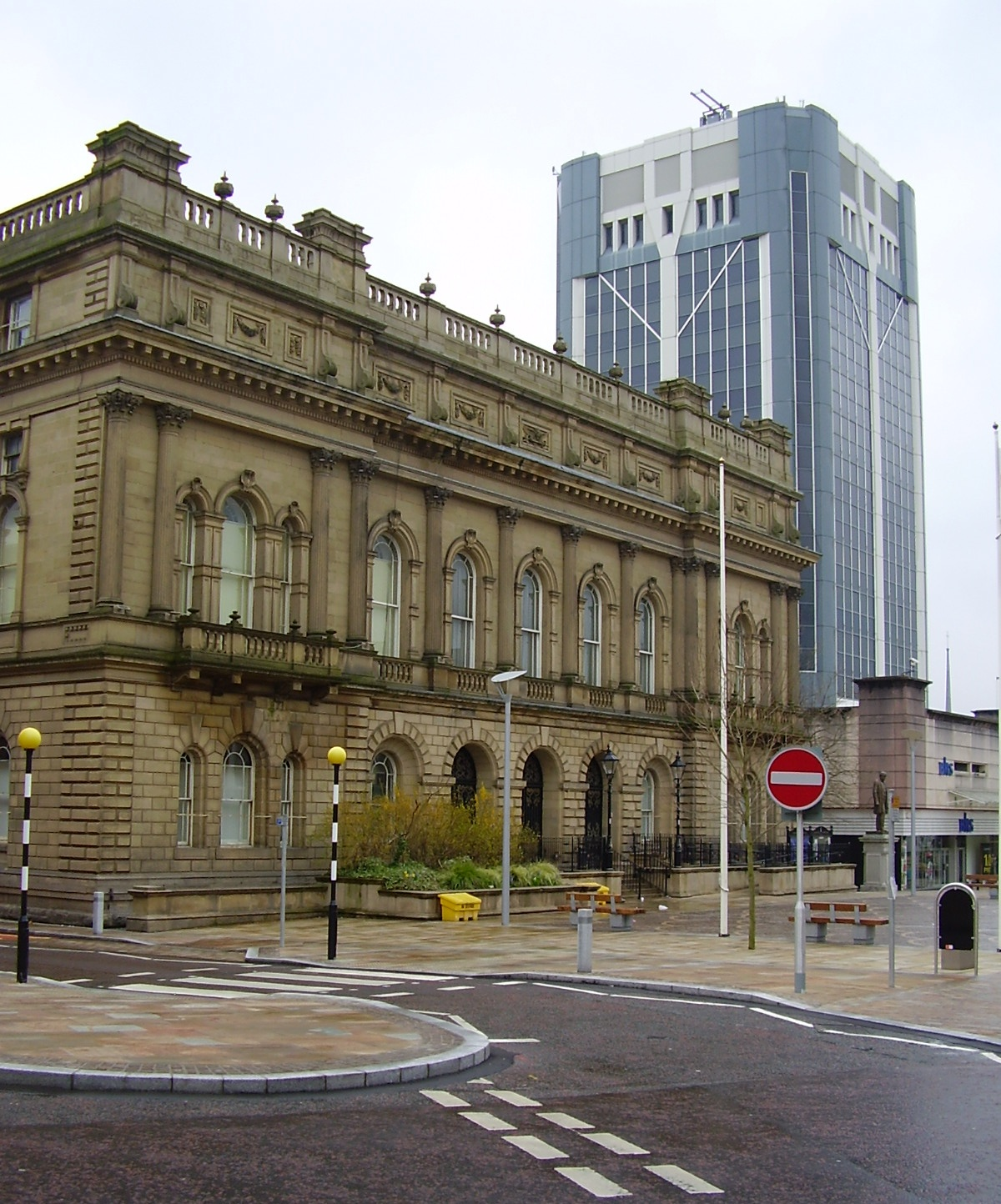
- The Italianate 19th-century town hall in the foreground and the 1960s tower block in the background

- Shown in Lancashire Location in Borough of Blackburn with Darwen
- 53.7499°N 2.4837°W
- Location: King William Street, Blackburn, England

History
- Built: 1856

Site notes
- Architect: James Patterson
- Architectural style: Italianate style

Listed Building – Grade II
- Official name: Town Hall
- Designated: 19 April 1974
- Reference no.: 1239734

Blackburn Town Hall is a municipal building on King William Street in Blackburn, England. The town hall, which is the headquarters of Blackburn with Darwen Borough Council, is a Grade II listed building.

== History ==
The foundation stone for the building was laid by Joseph Feilden of Witton Park, Lancashire, on 28 October 1852. The building, which was designed by James Patterson in the Italianate style and built by Richard Hacking and William Stones, was officially opened by William Hoole, the mayor, on 30 October 1856. The design for the front of the building involved Corinthian order columns on the first floor. It originally housed a police station with 18 cells, a large assembly room, and a council chamber. The town hall became the headquarters of the Municipal Borough of Blackburn on its completion, and the headquarters of Blackburn County Borough in 1889.

King George V and Queen Mary visited the town hall in July 1913, and Queen Elizabeth II, accompanied by the Duke of Edinburgh, visited the building in April 1955.

A tower block annexe was constructed in 1969; the two buildings were connected by an elevated, enclosed footbridge. The tower block was 198 feet (60 m) tall and the top was 545 feet (166 m) 9 inches (23 cm) above sea-level when built. The complex went on to be the headquarters of the Lancashire borough of Blackburn in 1974 before becoming the headquarters of the new unitary authority, Blackburn with Darwen Borough Council, in 1998.

A paving stone was laid outside the town hall in August 2017 to commemorate the life of Company Quartermaster-Sergeant William Grimbaldeston from Blackburn who was awarded the Victoria Cross during the First World War. Additional paving stones were laid outside the town hall in April 2018 to commemorate the lives of Lieutenant-Commander Percy Dean and Second-Lieutenant John Schofield, both of whom achieved the same distinction. A fourth paving stone was laid outside the town hall in June 2019 to commemorate the life of Private James Pitts who had achieved the distinction in the Second Boer War.

In May 2019, Blackburn with Darwen Borough Council announced plans to refurbish the third and fourth floors of the 19th-century listed building which remains the main offices of the council.

== See also ==
- Listed buildings in Blackburn

== Sources ==
- Abram, William Alexander (1877). A History of Blackburn: Town and Parish. J. G. & J. Toulmin.
- J. Burrow and Co., ed. (1970). Blackburn: Official Handbook. Cheltenham and London. ISBN 0-85026-110-4.
- Alan Duckworth (2005). Blackburn: Town and City memories. The Francis Frith Collection. ISBN 1-85937-986-9.
