= William Henry Grimbaldeston =

English recipient of the Victoria Cross

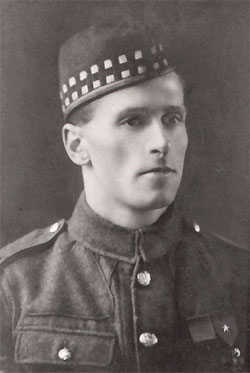
- Born: 19 September 1889; Blackburn, Lancashire
- Died: 13 August 1959 (aged 69); Blackburn
- Military career
- Allegiance: United Kingdom
- Branch: British Army
- Rank: Company Quartermaster-Sergeant
- Service number: 13531
- Units: The King's Own Scottish Borderers
- Conflicts: World War I
- Awards: Victoria Cross; Croix de Guerre (France)

William Henry Grimbaldeston VC (19 September 1889 – 13 August 1959) was an English recipient of the Victoria Cross, the highest and most prestigious award for gallantry in the face of the enemy that can be awarded to British and Commonwealth forces.

Grimbaldeston was 27 years old, and an Acting Company Quartermaster-Sergeant in the 1st Battalion, The King's Own Scottish Borderers, British Army at the Battle of Passchendaele during the First World War when he performed a deed for which he was awarded the Victoria Cross.

On 16 August 1917 at Wijdendrift, Belgium, Company Quartermaster-Sergeant Grimbaldeston noticed that the unit on his left was held up by enemy machine-gun fire from a blockhouse. Arming himself with a rifle and hand grenade he started to crawl towards his objective, and when he had advanced about 100 yards another soldier came forward to give covering support. Although wounded, he pushed on to the blockhouse, threatened the machine-gun teams inside with a hand grenade and forced them to surrender. This action resulted in the capture of 36 prisoners, six machine-guns and one trench mortar.

He was also awarded the French Croix de Guerre.

== The medal ==
His Victoria Cross is displayed at the Regimental Museum of The Kings Own Scottish Borderers, Berwick upon Tweed, Northumberland, England.
