= Plains Cotton Cooperative Association =

Formed in 1953, the Plains Cotton Cooperative Association (PCCA) is a farmed-owned cooperative effort in the United States. PCCA distributes its cotton through its computerized trading system, The Seam.
