= Lewis Textile Museum =

Former museum in Blackburn, Lancashire

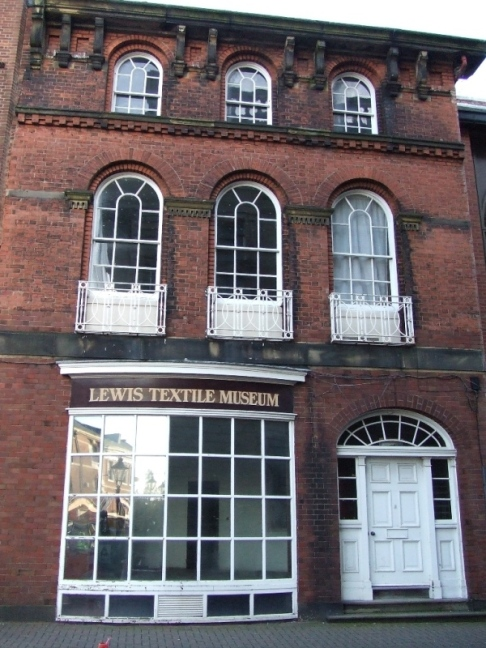
- Building of the Lewis Textile Museum

- Location within Blackburn town centre

General information
- Architectural style: Victorian, palazzo style, ground floor of Regency style
- Location: Blackburn, Lancashire, England
- Coordinates: 53.7501°N 2.4843°W

Technical details
- Material: Brick
- Floor count: 3

Listed Building – Grade II
- Official name: Textile Museum
- Designated: 19 April 1974
- Reference no.: 1273699

The Lewis Textile Museum was bequeathed to the people of Blackburn by a local cotton industrialist, Thomas Boys Lewis (1869–1942). The Lewis Textile Museum was closed in 2006 and a new gallery with its collection of looms and textile machinery was moved to Blackburn Museum and Art Gallery. The gallery which now houses the exhibits at the main Museum & Art Gallery was named CottonTown and opened in April 2007 by Jack Straw, the local Labour MP.

The closure of the Lewis Textile Museum caused surprise which the local paper, the Lancashire Telegraph reported.

In 2006 the building of the Lewis Textile Museum, was planned to become a drugs centre although this was met with local uproar.

== See also ==
- Blackburn Museum and Art Gallery
