= Blackburn Museum and Art Gallery =

Museum in Lancashire, England

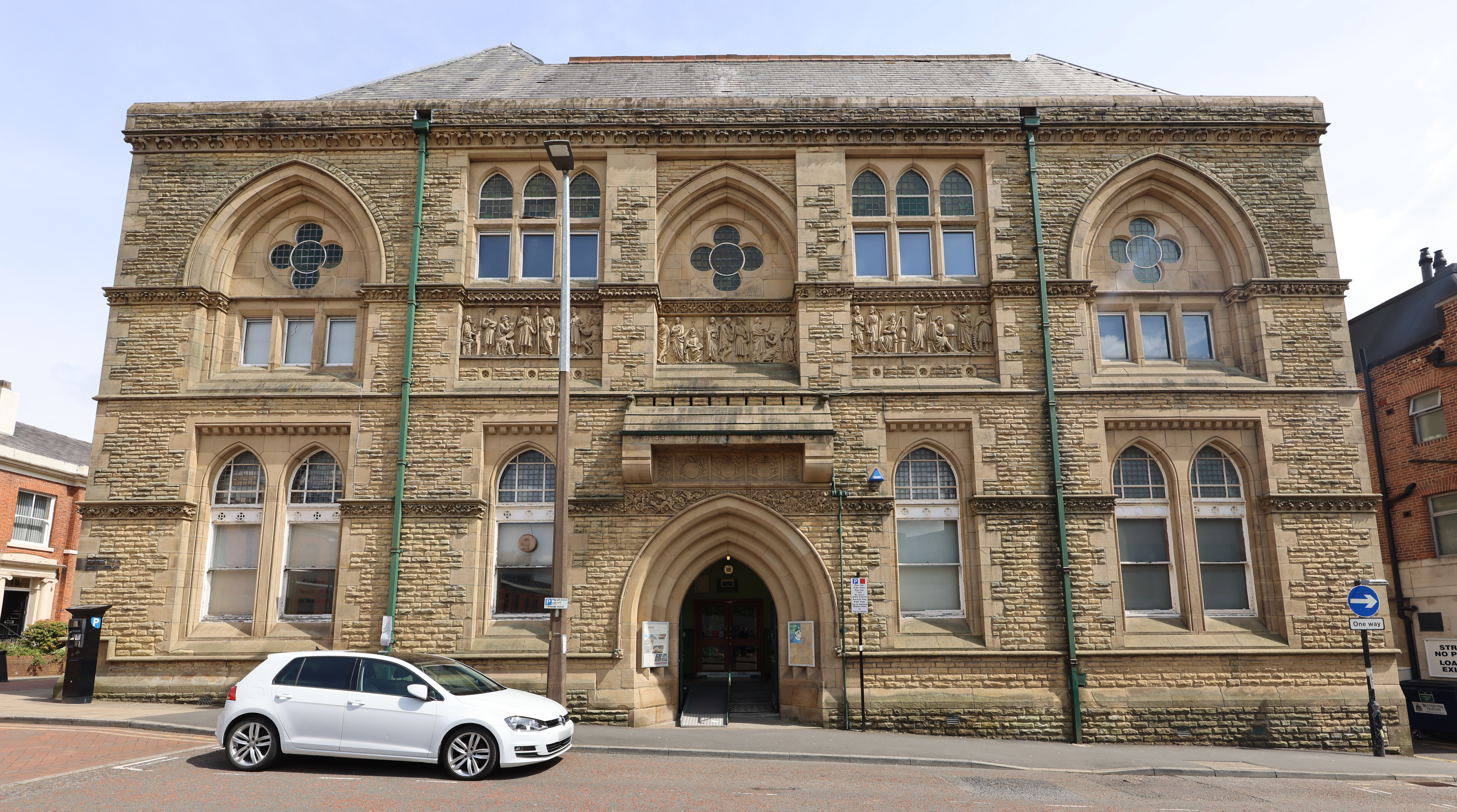
- entrance side of the museum

- Location within Blackburn town centre
- Established: 1874
- Location: Blackburn
- Coordinates: 53.7501°N 2.4841°W
- Collections: Japanese Print, Cotton Town the Manuscript, Numismatic
- Owner: Blackburn with Darwen Borough Council
- Website: blackburnmuseum.org.uk

Listed Building – Grade II
- Official name: Blackburn Museum
- Designated: 1 August 1995
- Reference no.: 1223411

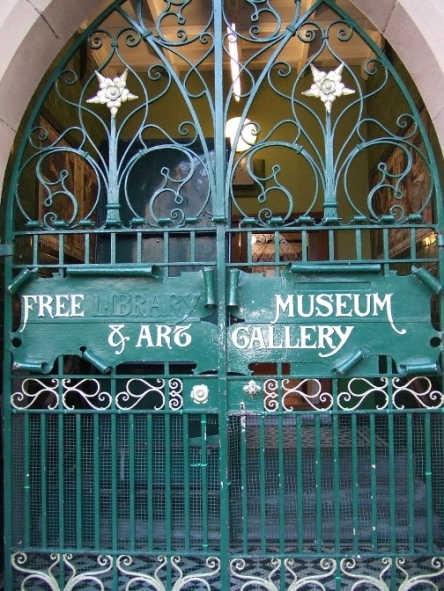
The original gate to the building

The Blackburn Museum and Art Gallery is the local museum service for the borough of Blackburn with Darwen Borough Council. It is a museum with collections of Christian icons, Egyptian hieroglyphs, and local history, as well as those of the former Lewis Textile Museum.

== The building ==
The museum is in a Grade II listed building, on the corner of Museum Street and Richmond Terrace. It was originally opened as an art gallery and library in 1874, with the library occupying the ground floor and the art gallery on the first floor. The building was enlarged in 1893. In the 1970s, the library moved to Town Hall Street, occupying the former premises of the Co-operative Central Store, providing more space for the display of the local and social history collections which formed Blackburn Museum & Art Gallery. A project to repair the roof began in July 2023. It was completed by March 2024.

== Lewis Textile Museum ==
The museum service was also responsible for the Lewis Textile Museum before it was closed. The contents of the Lewis Textile Museum have now been moved into the main museum building on Museum Street and the gallery which houses the collection of looms renamed Cottontown. The Lewis Textile Museum was bequeathed by Thomas Boys Lewis, a local cotton industrialist.

== Collections ==
The most notable collections include the Japanese Print Collection which was amassed by Thomas Boys Lewis. The Manuscript and Numismatic Collections, both of which were bequeathed by Edward Hart and the Icon Collection.

The museum has an Egyptology collection based on items collected by John Garstang. It also holds the Victoria Cross of Marcus Ervine-Andrews, the last Irish man awarded the VC, who was educated at Stonyhurst College.

== Exhibitions ==
In 2006, Blackburn Museum and Art Gallery took part in the touring exhibition, C21, which was part of the Fukuoka Asian Art Trinennale. Reviews of the exhibition were reported by agencies such as the BBC.

== See also ==
- Listed buildings in Blackburn
