= Eccles Shorrock =

Eccles Shorrock (born Eccles Shorrock Ashton) (1827–1889) was a Lancashire cotton industrialist who was responsible for commissioning the India Mill and its chimney, a major landmark in Darwen, Lancashire.

== Early life ==
Shorrock was born Eccles Shorrock Ashton to Thomas Ashton and Mary Ashton in Clitheroe, Lancashire and named after his uncle, the first Eccles Shorrock, who had purchased the Bowling Green Mill in Darwen from the Carrs in 1830. Shorrock was eleven years old when his uncle had thrown his Queen Victoria's Coronation Celebrations, a dinner celebration that lasted from 10:00 a.m. to 8:00 p.m. when his 1,400 work employees and tenants consumed 3,300 pounds of roast beef and plum pudding and drank 220 gallons of nut brown ale. The entire dinner celebration was filled with jubilation.

In 1829, Shorrock's mother died just two weeks after giving birth to his brother Ralph, leaving Thomas Ashton a widower with two young sons, the toddler Shorrock and the infant Ralph. Thomas Ashton soon remarried and with that new marriage came Shorrock and Ralph's half-brother William, causing Thomas to decide to give up his first two children. They were taken in and raised by Mary's brother Eccles Shorrock who had means and resources to do so and made the decision to formally adopt Shorrock and Ralph. Because of Shorrock's uncle's great charity and officially taking in him and his brother Ralph as sons, Eccles Shorrock Ashley decided to unofficially drop the surname Ashton and change his name to Eccles Shorrock II,

Shorrock's uncle made certain the boys had a good education and sent them to the Hoole's Academy in Blackburn for their formative years. After the Hoole's Academy Shorrock and Ralph were privately tutored and entered University College, London.

== Early adult life ==
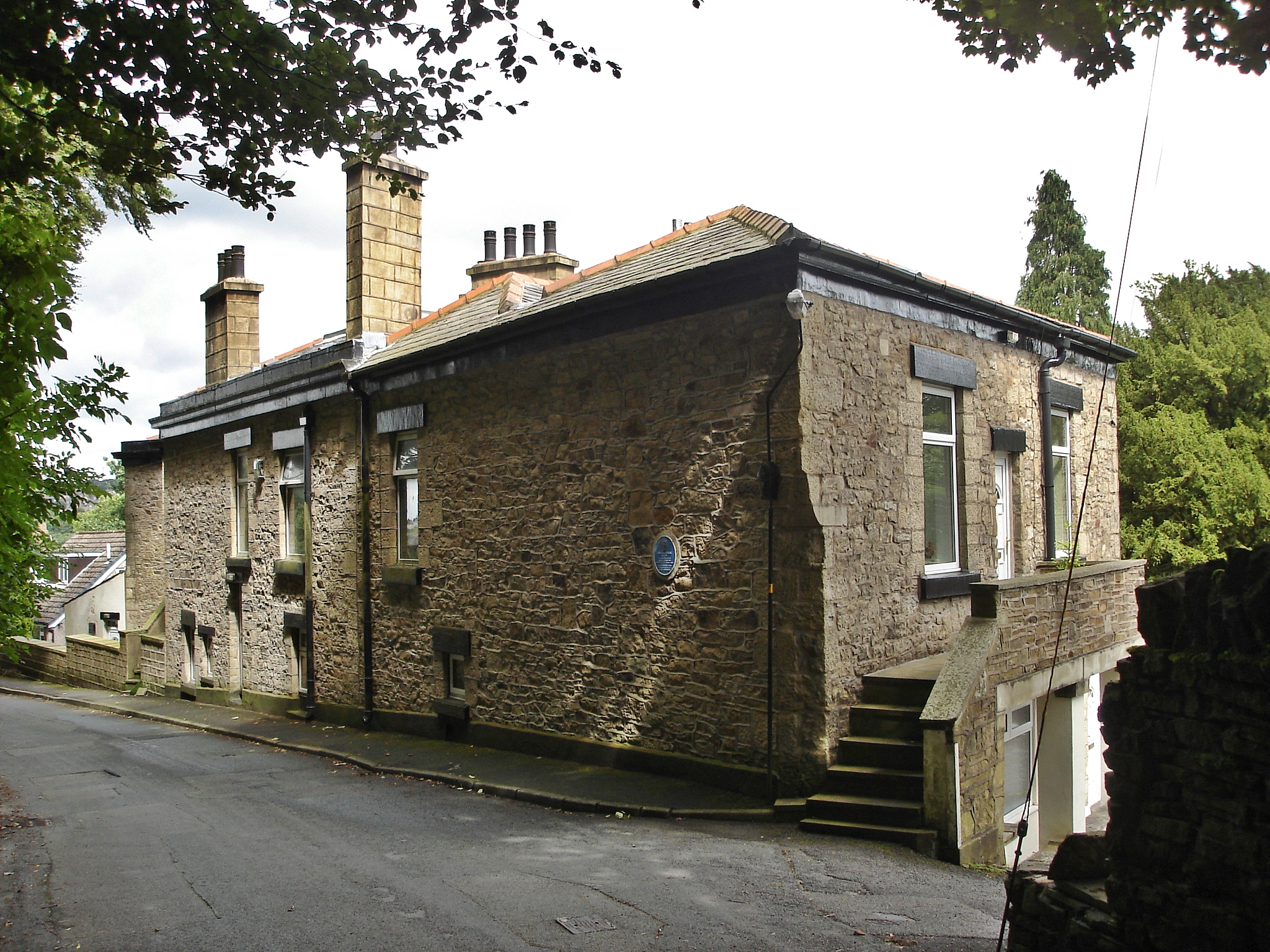
Low Hill House, Darwen

On April 23, 1851, Eccles Shorrock married Sarah Dimmock. In 1853, Shorrock's uncle died without a natural born heir despite two marriages and therefore bequeathed Shorrock his estate. Shorrock moved into his uncle's home, Low Hill House in Darwen (originally built for Samuel Crompton) and took over his uncle's mills in Darwen, including Darwen Mill and New Mill. Eccles Shorrock was only twenty-six years old when he received his uncle's inheritance and his company. He immediately took in his brother Ralph and his half-brother William as partners in the business. One year after taking over the India Mill Company Shorrock had expanded the firm's operations to papermaking, a coal-pit, and a sawmill. Following the success of his businesses he decided to build another mill, calling it Hope Mill and giving it to his cousin W.T. Ashton.

From this point on Shorrock's civic duties, public speaking, business interests and family life would be an important element in the industrial expansion of East Lancashire. Shorrock had taken up the particular civic duty of being elected to the Local Board of Health. In 1855 he had been made a justice of the peace in Darwen and in 1858 become the chairman of the Darwen Health Board. Before the end of the 1850s he was an active participant in all educational matters in the town of Darwen, including being chairman of the Mechanic's Institute a good number of times.

In 1856 he came to a formal agreement with his family members on matters of positions and remuneration with the "New Article For Ten Year Partnership". In 1859 work commenced on building the current India Mill, although it would be 1871 before the mill would be ready for production.

== The 1860s ==
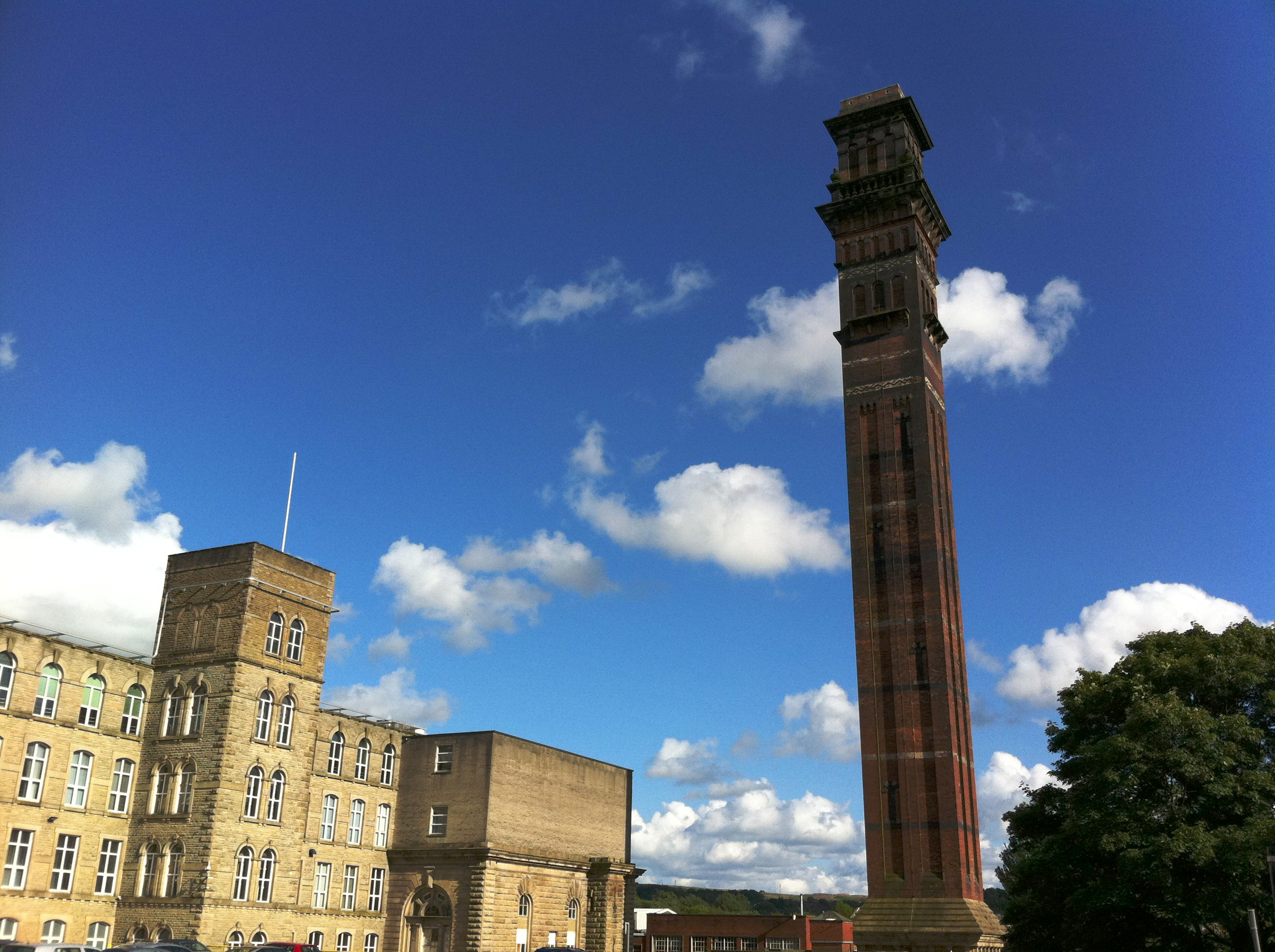
India Mill

The 1860s was a difficult time for Eccles Shorrock and his India Mill Company and proved to be a definitive decade for both of them. The decade started with the American Civil War which had an effect not only on Shorrock and his India Mill Company but also on the entire cotton trade/milling industry.

This effect was due to the fact that the whole of the Southern United States was dominated by cotton farming and production and during the war the production of cotton fell because of the Confederate States of America's focus on military production. Certain trade embargoes also lead to a considerable reduction in the export of cotton from the United States. The lack of American cotton lead to a large influx of Indian cotton, which was of a significantly lesser quality and yet still more expensive because of transportation expenses. The lack of American cotton had caused the price of Indian cotton to skyrocket.

Shorrock luckily had purchased plenty of American cotton to fill his reserves at the beginning of the war and there was no need for him to pay a 300% increase in cotton prices. Cotton reserves meant that Shorrock was able to weather the storm of the "Cotton Famine" when other cotton mill companies which had not taken similar precautions at the start of the war were forced to suffer.

Eccles Shorrock's uncle had opened the William Street School for the purpose of educating people who had lost their job in the cotton mill industry in new trades, believing that the William Street School would combat unemployment problems in the town of Darwen and the larger area. In 1862, the numbers of those who needed assistance in the William Street School and under the Darwen Relief Fund that Shorrock had founded went from 600 at the start of the year to 3000 at the end. Eccles Shorrock had personally donated 1000 British Pounds to the Darwen Relief Fund .

In 1862, Eccles Shorrock and many others that were a part of the Darwen Relief Fund donated 2000 Christmas dinner tickets to the unemployed and needy. In tandem with the Darwen Relief Fund the Lord of the local Manor, William Duckworth, donated the money for an addition 2000 Christmas dinner tickets to match Shorrock and the relief fund. The economic casualties from the Queensland Cotton Growing Company were invited to the assembly room in 1863; the address to these people was headed with the title "Emigration or Starvation!".

Despite the despair that the Cotton Famine caused by the American Civil War had inflicted on the English cotton mill industry, Eccles Shorrock and the India Mill Company were able to prosper during and after this period. In the mid-1860s the new India Mill was completed with its mock campanile chimney. The India Mill Company's building and chimney would be and is looked at as a symbol of prosperity and productiveness for the town of Darwen as it stands as the greatest monument the town has to offer.

It is also worth stating that the chimney was not completed without daring and bold actions by the common man. As was accounted in the "Blackburn Times" on October 1, 1864, Briggs Knowles had volunteered to climb the height of the chimney to untangle and free the rope that was used to bus the materials (in a box) at the top of the chimney in progress. Knowles had climbed the chimney without any safety measures other than his own sure-handedness and his wits. Knowles was successful in his attempt and Shorrock had awarded him 20 shillings. As evidence to the aforementioned the building became a symbol for prosperity in the town of Darwen because the town and the India Mill Company was seemingly at its height in the realm of commerce. An 1867 table of works in Darwen projected extremely positive numbers for the town and the India Mill Company; unemployment in Darwen had drastically improved from the years of 1861–1864. In Darwen's table of works in 1867 it also showed that the Shorrocks had 32 cotton weaving works that were employing approximately 7000 individuals producing over 28,550,000 pounds of cloth per annum.

Eccles Shorrock and the India Mill Company's enjoyed great success and recognition for its new building and iconic chimney. There were many social gatherings and dinners that had been arranged in the new building to celebrate holidays and special occasions; including—initially after—the completion of the building itself. In May 1868, Shorrock had been able to commission the Art Treasures Exhibit to be held at the India Mill Company building in Darwen. Shorrock and his more philanthropic intentions had hoped that the funds that would be procured from hosting such an event would be substantial enough to build a new Belgrave Congressional School. The Art Treasure Exhibit at the India Mill Company building was considered to be gigantic and epic. Not only did the people from all over the county of Lancashire come to the exhibit but from all over the North Western region of England came to see the exhibit in Darwen.

== Post 1860s ==
Eccles Shorrock came out of the 1860s a success in everything he lent himself towards; this considering the great adversities that had befallen him during the decade. Despite all of these trials that he had to face he had pretty much made his legacy and the India Mill Company was on a strong footing to start the 1870s. By 1871 the India Mill had been equipped with machinery and could start production. An 1871 census record of the Low Hill estate read that Eccles Shorrock was the landowner, cotton spinning and manufacturer that employs 630 males, 652 Women, 122 males under 13, 102 females under 13 for a total of 1,505 employees to the India Mill Company. By 1876, these census figures would have certainly increased at a significant amount.

In May 1874, there was full-time working and ever increasing sales which made it the perfect time for Eccles Shorrock to found his new cotton mill company "India Mills (Darwen) Cotton Spinning Company". Also during this year Eccles Shorrock had been elected as the chairman of the "North East Liberal Association", this experience had greatly influenced Shorrock and piqued his interest in matters of politics. During Shorrock's time with the North East Liberal Association he had the opportunity to make acquaintance and connection with many prominent people in the "Liberal Party"; for instance he had made contact with Lord Cavendish who would later succeed Gladstone as the leader of their party.

Eccles Shorrock and the India Mills Cotton Spinning Company would get through to 1876 successfully but 1877 was a different story. In 1877, a recession hit England and this time Shorrock and the India Mills would not dodge the financial stresses that lay ahead. The recession was the result of a number of things: firstly, the Russo-Turkish War had ignited that year and destabilized the economy, not only England but in all of Europe, next there was discontent over taxation within England that caused businesses and investors to be wary about taking risks, and lastly the Import/Export duties that the English manufacturers had to endure was not helping the situation. England imposed no tariffs on goods imported from France but France had imposed excruciatingly high tariffs on English goods. This of course had negatively affected Shorrock and the India Mills Cotton Spinning Company along with other entire industries within England.

By July 1877, Eccles Shorrock's India Mills Cotton Spinning Company was in an apparent decline and facing major difficulties. On August 18, 1877, the "Darwen News" published an article that painted a picture of the company's apparent distress. The article forwarded some sympathies and hopes for the Company's recovery, noting that the company and its people "demonstrates a general conviction of high character and honourable conduct". That said the article believed that the company would weather the current economic uncertainties and "retain its important position as a large employer of labour in Darwen".

By 1878, the situation and economic distress that the India Mills Cotton Spinning Company was suffering had got worse. In fact, the economic downturn suffered by the community of Darwen made the previous problems caused by the cotton famine during the American Civil War seemed inconsequential. Employees in the industry were being laid off and wages were temporarily cut by 10%. The millworkers started to protest, but the protests turned violent and very quickly the protesters became rioters. Eccles Shorrock was negatively affected by the rioting, the workers suffering being due as he saw it to his company's failures. During this time was the first evidence of Shorrock's drop in his prowess as a business leader and in his health. Shorrock was advised by his doctor to leave all the commotion behind and go abroad. Shorrock was only sent abroad for a short period of time just to avoid and get away from the rioters and their disruptions and destruction. However Eccles Shorrock's absence from Darwen didn't stop the riots from happening in Darwen and Blackburn. The unrest would continue not only there but in all of the cotton districts of England, starting in 1878 and only ending in 1880.

== Family fallout ==
There was now evidence that there was discontent and conflict between Eccles Shorrock and his two brothers Ralph and William; the antagonism between the three brothers was reported by the Darwen News in August 1880. Ralph Shorrock and William Ashton were both interested in bringing in receivers to liquidate the company but Eccles Shorrock had been adamantly opposed to the idea. In August 1880 Ralph Shorrock and William Ashton both sought an injunction from the High Court in London to put an end to Eccles Shorrock's interference with their interests. However, Eccles Shorrock disregarded the court injunction and evaded the London authorities by returning to Lancashire.

In September 1880, Darwen News had reported that Eccles Shorrock had ordered the company to seize operations and extinguish the boilers in the mill, bringing the mill's production on an indefinite halt. Charles Costeker, the town clerk for Darwen, informed Shorrock that he would have to appear in front of the High Court in London to answer for the injunction, and that if he did not change his "stance" that he would be held in contempt of court and imprisoned. Shorrock had decided to ignore Charles Costeker's letter and did not heed the warning that it contained. Shorrock had also ordered the stopping of payments made to all the wages and accounts. He had also told the bank not to recognize Ralph Shorrock and William Ashton's signatures and told the postman not to deliver any letters and messages to anyone but himself. These actions had dire consequences for Eccles Shorrock and his brothers; the family ultimately became split over the issue.

On August 23, 1880, Ralph Shorrock had stated in an affidavit that he had completely given up on any possibility of the partnership with his brother (Eccles Shorrock) to continue and that he had serious doubts about his sanity. A little later on August 28, 1880, William Ashton had stated in an affidavit that the New Mill which had 840 looms and 40,000 spindles and Darwen Mill with 50,000 spindles had also been stopped.

Eccles Shorrock was hurried out of Darwen one Saturday morning in September 1880 to catch a 10:27 a.m. train in order to avoid his workers who got off at 12:30 p.m. and the press. The Darwen News reported on 18 September 1880 on Eccles Shorrock's departure from the town: "...taken to the station with his legs dangling out of the cab, by an indirect route, so as to avoid publicity." Shorrock was designated to be received at the Holloway Prison where he would reside for four months. He was released earlier than expected based on condition that he would stay away from the town of Darwen for at least four months. After Shorrock's family had disowned him and Darwen had ousted him, he never returned to his former glory in matters of business and local respect. Shorrock's finances and fortunes would take an inevitable decline after being released from prison; and as expected...his health would accompany his fortunes in their demise. He wrote a pamphlet about his experiences in the prison.

In 1887 his mental health finally gave way and he was admitted to Edinburgh asylum suffering from manic depression.

== Death and legacy ==
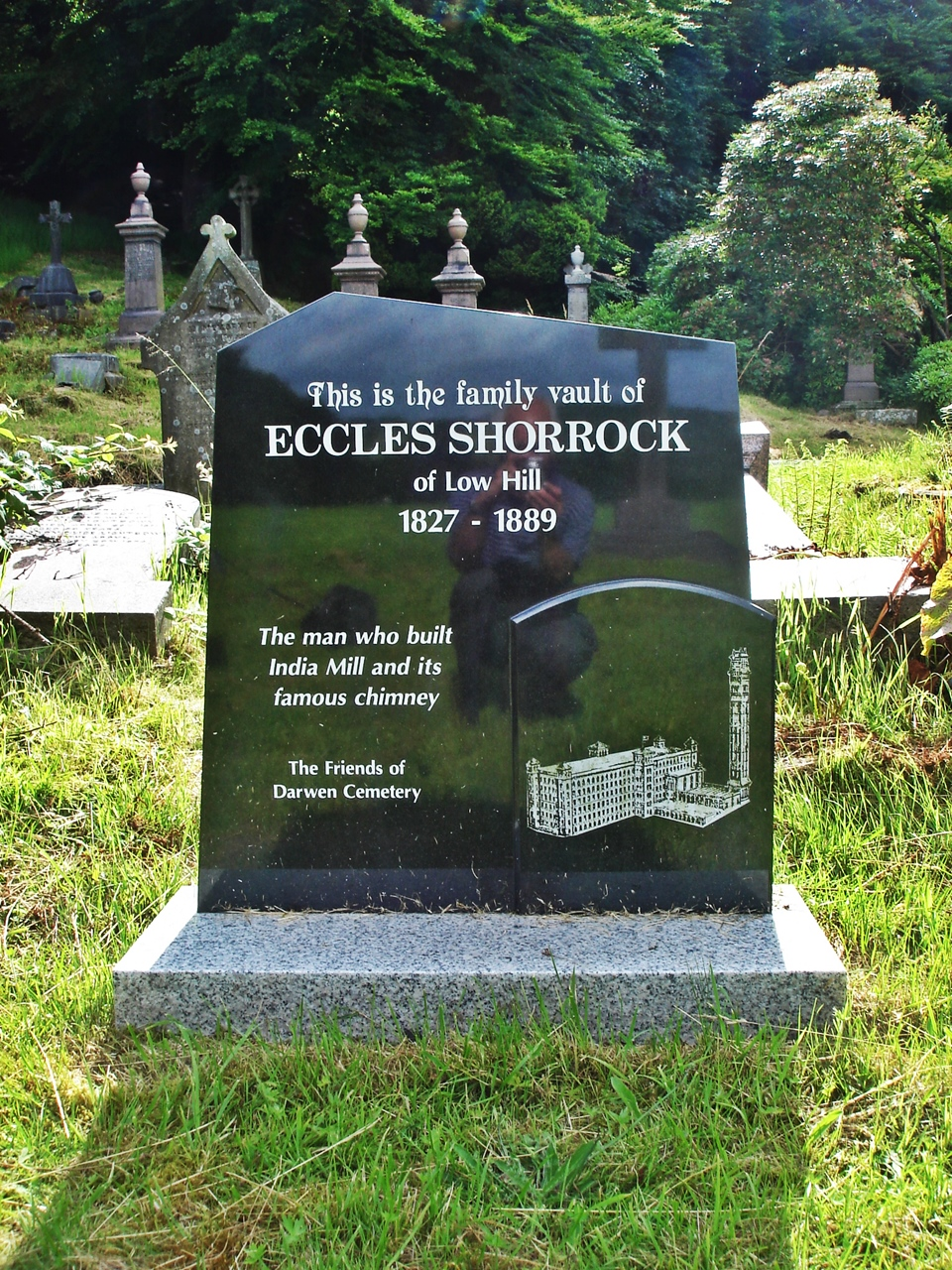
Eccles Shorrock's grave, Darwen cemetery

Eccles Shorrock died in the Edinburgh Asylum on 28 September 1889 and his body was taken back to Darwen to be buried in the family plot at Darwen Cemetery. Several of his children also suffered from similar mental issues.

The India Mill building today is privately owned and leases out spaces for local enterprises to carry out their business.
