= List of schools in Blackburn with Darwen =

This is a list of schools in Blackburn with Darwen in the English county of Lancashire.

== State-funded schools ==
=== Primary schools ===
- Ashleigh Primary School, Darwen
- Audley Infant School, Blackburn
- Audley Junior School, Blackburn
- Avondale Primary School, Darwen
- Blackburn St Thomas' CE Primary School, Blackburn
- Blackburn the Redeemer CE Primary, Blackburn
- Brookhouse Primary School, Blackburn
- Cedars Primary School, Blackburn
- Daisyfield Primary School, Blackburn
- Darwen St Barnabas CE Primary Academy, Darwen
- Darwen St James CE Primary Academy, Darwen
- Darwen St Peter's CE Primary School, Darwen
- Feniscowles Primary School, Feniscowles
- Griffin Park Primary School, Blackburn
- Hoddlesden St Paul's CE Primary School, Hoddlesden
- Holy Souls RC Primary School, Blackburn
- Holy Trinity CE School, Darwen
- Intack Primary School, Blackburn
- Lammack Primary School, Blackburn
- Livesey St Francis' CE Primary School, Blackburn
- Longshaw Community Junior School, Blackburn
- Longshaw Infant School, Blackburn
- Lower Darwen Primary School, Lower Darwen
- Meadowhead Infant School, Blackburn
- Meadowhead Junior School, Blackburn
- The Olive School, Blackburn
- Our Lady of Perpetual Succour RC Primary School, Blackburn
- Queen Elizabeth's Grammar School, Blackburn
- Roe Lee Park Primary School, Blackburn
- Sacred Heart RC Primary School, Blackburn
- St Aidan's CE Primary School, Blackburn
- St Alban's RC Primary School, Blackburn
- St Anne's RC Primary School, Blackburn
- St Antony's RC Primary School, Blackburn
- St Barnabas and St Paul's CE Primary School, Blackburn
- St Cuthbert's CE Primary School, Blackburn
- St Edward's RC Primary School, Darwen
- St Gabriel's CE Primary School, Blackburn
- St James' CE Primary School, Blackburn
- St James' CE Primary School, Lower Darwen
- St Joseph's RC Primary School, Darwen
- St Luke and St Philips CE Primary School, Blackburn
- St Mary's and St Joseph's RC Primary School, Blackburn
- St Matthew's CE Primary School, Blackburn
- St Michael with St John CE Primary School, Blackburn
- St Paul's RC Primary School, Feniscowles
- St Peter's RC Primary School, Blackburn
- St Silas' CE Primary School, Blackburn
- St Stephen's CE Primary School, Blackburn
- St Stephen's Tockholes CE Primary School, Tockholes
- Shadsworth Infant School, Blackburn
- Shadsworth Junior School, Blackburn
- Sudell Primary School, Darwen
- Turton and Edgworth CE Primary School, Edgworth
- Turton Belmont Community Primary School, Belmont
- Wensley Fold CE Primary Academy, Blackburn

=== Secondary schools ===
- Blackburn Central High School, Blackburn
- Darwen Aldridge Community Academy, Darwen
- Darwen Aldridge Enterprise Studio, Darwen
- Darwen Vale High School, Darwen
- Our Lady and St John Catholic College, Blackburn
- Pleckgate High School, Blackburn
- Queen Elizabeth's Grammar School, Blackburn
- St Bede's RC High School, Blackburn
- St Wilfrid's Church of England Academy, Blackburn
- Tauheedul Islam Boys' High School, Blackburn
- Tauheedul Islam Girls' High School, Blackburn
- Witton Park Academy, Blackburn

=== Special and alternative schools ===
- Crosshill Special School, Darwen
- Eden School, Blackburn
- The Heights Free School, Blackburn
- Newfield School, Blackburn
- St Thomas's Centre, Blackburn

=== Further education ===
- Blackburn College, Blackburn
- St Mary's Sixth Form College, Blackburn [Now closed]

== Independent schools ==
=== Primary and preparatory schools ===
- Dar Ul Madinah, Blackburn
- Rawdhatul Uloom Islamic Primary School, Blackburn

=== Senior and all-through schools ===
- Al Islah Girls' High School, Blackburn
- Islamiyah School, Blackburn
- Jamiatul Ilm Wal Huda, Blackburn
- Markazul Uloom, Blackburn
- Noorul Uloom, Blackburn
- Rawdhatul Ilm Wal Huda, Blackburn
- Westholme School, Blackburn

=== Special and alternative schools ===
- Aurora Woodlands School, Darwen
- Lower Pastures, Hoddlesden
