= Edward Chapman =

Edward Chapman may refer to:

- Edward Chapman (British Army officer) (1840–1926)
- Edward Chapman (actor) (1901–1977), British comic actor, best remembered for his work with Norman Wisdom
- Edward Chapman (politician) (1839–1906), British academic and Conservative politician
- Edward Chapman (publisher) (1804–1880), British publisher and co-founder of Chapman & Hall
- Edward Thomas Chapman (1920–2002), Welsh World War II Corporal
- Ed Chapman (artist) (born 1971), British artist, best known for mosaic portraits
- Ed Chapman (baseball) (1905–2000), American major league player
- Eddie Chapman (1914–1997), British double agent code name Zig-Zag during World War II
- Eddie Chapman (footballer) (1923–2002), West Ham United player and club secretary
- Edward Chapman, rector and founder of Bishop's College School (1836)
- Edward Chapman (solicitor) (c. 1813–1884), English solicitor, magistrates' clerk, and municipal official

== See also ==
- Ted Chapman (1934–2005), Australian politician
- Edwards and Chapman Building, a heritage-listed building in Brisbane, Queensland, Australia
