= Timothy Marsden =

English footballer

Personal information
- Full name: Timothy Marsden
- Date of birth: 1865
- Place of birth: Darwen, England
- Date of death: 1932 (aged 66–67)
- Position: Forward

Senior career*
Years	Team	Apps	(Gls)
1891–1894	Darwen	11	(1)
- * Club domestic league appearances and goals

Timothy Marsden (1865–1932) was an English footballer who played in the Football League for Darwen.
