= Alan Bolton =

Alan Bolton may refer to:

- Alan Bolton (darts player), New Zealand darts player
- Alan Bolton (cricketer) (1939–2003), English cricketer
