= Marsh House, Darwen =

Coordinates: 53.698°N 2.461°W

- Location within Lancashire
- OS grid reference: SD695225
- Civil parish: Darwen
- Unitary authority: Blackburn with Darwen
- Ceremonial county: Lancashire
- Region: North West
- Country: England
- Sovereign state: United Kingdom
- Post town: DARWEN
- Postcode district: BB3
- Dialling code: 01254
- Police: Lancashire
- Fire: Lancashire
- Ambulance: North West
- UK Parliament: Rossendale and Darwen

Marsh House is an area of Darwen, Lancashire, England.

== History ==
The Marsh House area itself was used for industrial purposes in the 19th and 20th centuries. The main industry was mining and, due to the after-effects of this, certain parts of Marsh House cannot be built on for safety reasons even to this day. Parts of the mine at Ellison Fold still remain in Bailey's field next to Avallon Way.

The ward once had a railway station known as "Sough". This station was situated between the main Darwen Station and the Entiwstle Station. However this was closed after the number of people using the station fell. In recent years, there has been a push to reopen the station and the case for this is improving year on year because of a number of factors.

The ward also has the listed Turncroft Hall within its boundaries.

== Modern day ==
Over the past 40 years or so, the area has had large amount of investment put into it. Most of the money has gone into building housing on Green Belt land. However, there is an area where houses have been built on land previously used for factories.

=== Local government ===
The result of the 2014 local government election in Marsh House ward was as follows:

Name	Party	Votes
Kevin Connor	Conservative	650
John Roberts	Labour	658
Mark Westall	Liberal Democrat	851

Traditionally, the area had been a Conservative stronghold but all councillors now represent the Labour Party (UK) Sadly John Roberts died in 2017 at the subsequent by-election the seat was re taken by the Conservatives

=== Facilities ===
Marsh House had several pubs - The Borough, The Craven Heifer (named for the eponymous Craven Heifer), The Crown and Thistle, The Victoria and The Greenfield. The area also has a Working Men's Club.Only The Craven Heifer, The Victoria and The Greenfield remain. The Borough is now apartments and the WMC is now a gym.

=== Education ===
The ward is served by a primary school called St Peter's Church of England. The area has no secondary education institutions but the town of Darwen has two secondary schools (D.A.C.A and Vale). Many parents decide though to send their children, out of the town to one of the following-(a) Q.E.G.S- Independent (b) Westholme- Independent (c) Lords- Independent (d) Canon Slade-Bolton State (e) St Bede's RC - Blackburn State (f) St Wilfrid's- Blackburn State or (g) Turton- Bolton State.

== Future ==
In recent months, there has been a big move towards restoring the heritage of the area. Things such as stone walls, field gates for the abandoned farm land, the Rosehill Riverbed, the original Blacksnape gates and the mining history have all been brought to the attention of both local community groups and the council.

There is also going to be a big push towards tourism for the area over the next year alongside the rest of Darwen.

== Areas of the ward ==
Due to most of the housing being built in the north of the ward, areas have been split up according to their position in the north of the ward.

=== North Marsh House ===
- Avallon Way and Lisbon Drive
- Bailey's Field

=== East Marsh House ===
- The Housing areas of Chapter Road, Pole Lane and Priory Drive
- The Village of Clear Water
- The Woodland and Fields of Rosehill
- Half of The Village of Blacksnape and playing fields

=== West Marsh House ===
- Ashton Park
- The Sidings
- The Hall of Turncroft and surrounding housing area
- The Housing area of Highfield

=== South Marsh House ===
- The housing area and fields of Sough
- The housing area and fields of Cranberry
- Spring Vale Garden Village
- Part of the West Pennine Moors (including the rural area of Grimehills)
