= James Watson (author) =

English writer (1936–2015)

James Arnold Watson (8 November 1936 – 28 April 2015) was an English writer. The best known of his twelve children's novels is Talking in Whispers—winner of The Other Award from the Children's Rights Workshop, runner-up for the 1984 Carnegie Medal, and, in its German translation, winner of the 1987 Buxtehude Bull award. Two others are Ticket to Prague and The Bull Leapers. He was a lecturer in media and communication studies and he has written three books in the field.

== Biography ==
Watson was born in Darwen, Lancashire, England.

His book The Noisy Ducks of Buxtehude is a dual-language text (English/German) aimed at very young readers.

A 1989 profile in the U.K. children's books magazine Books for Keeps noted that a theme of Watson's work was "a universal fight for human rights", and that three of his novels, "adventure thrillers set amid the Spanish Civil War (The Freedom Tree), the Chile of the ‘disappeared’ (Talking in Whispers), and a contemporary Britain where the Establishment closes ranks over nuclear secrecy (Where Nobody Sees)" had been praised "for their exciting action, their passion and their challenge to debate." The Carnegie Medal panel described Talking in Whispers as covering "the difficult theme of oppression in Chile, as seen through the eyes of three teenagers, with great honesty and sincerity."

He wrote two plays for senior schools and four plays for radio. He published the novel Fair Game – Steps of the Odessa in 2008 and "Pigs Might Fly", an original e-reader (Kindle), in 2013.

He died on 28 April 2015.

== Works ==
=== Fiction ===
- Sign of the Swallow
- The Bull Leapers
- Legion of The White Tiger
- The Freedom Tree
- Talking in Whispers
- Where Nobody Sees
- No Surrender
- Ticket to Prague
- Justice of the Dagger
- The Ghosts of Izieu
- "Make Your Move" and Other Stories
- Fair Game – Steps of the Odessa
- " Pigs Might Fly"

=== Dramas ===
- Banned! Tom Paine, This Was Your Life
- Gotcha!*Wars-R-Us.com
- Robin Hood: the Play, or How Prince John Pitted His Wits Against the Outlaws of Sherwood Forest
- The Noisy Ducks of Buxtehude
- Fair Game – Steps of the Odessa
- " Pigs Might Fly"

=== Educational ===
- "What is Communication Studies?"
- "The Dictionary of Media & Communication Studies" (with Anne Hill)
- "Media Communication: An Introduction to Theory & Process"
