= Ed Chapman (artist) =

British mosaic artist

- Born: Darwen, Lancashire, England
- Known for: Mosaics, 'Newsaics'
- Notable work: "McVitie's Chocolate Digestives" (2025); Jimi in Plectrums (2011); Lemmy in ceramic tiles (2006)

Ed Chapman (born 1971), in Darwen, Lancashire is a British mosaic artist. He is known the have used a vast array of differing materials in his work, from the familiar ceramic and stone tile, to plectrums, records and bullet casings.

He is the son of artist Margaret Chapman who was from the Northern School who was known for her detailed paintings of Edwardian street scenes.

Chapman became a professional artist in the 1990s. His artistic influences include Chuck Close, Robert Rauschenberg, and Jamie Reid. His work has sold original works on every continent and has been exhibited in galleries in the UK and around the world. He has raised more than a quarter of a million pounds for international charities through his artwork.

He has created several 'firsts' in mosaic, including Jimi Hendrix from Fender guitar picks, tennis star Andy Murray on carpet made from household items like tomato sauce and lipstick, Albert Einstein in metal, a chewing gum mosaic, a bullets mosaic and several others. Among his mosaics are portraits of David Bowie, Nelson Mandela, David Beckham in penny coins, Alan Sugar (done in sugar cubes) and Eric Cantona. Annie Lennox, Lemmy the founding member of Motörhead and chef Gordon Ramsay are among the clients who have commissioned a work by him. His portrait of Richard Burton incorporating 500 million-year-old Welsh slate was commissioned by the actor's widow Sally Burton in 2015 to mark 90 years since the actor's birth. The portrait is at Swansea University.

Chapman's mosaic of Jimi Hendrix, made of 5000 Fender guitar picks was auctioned for £23,000/$35000, another of John Lennon made on an easel once used by Lennon for £75.000 - one of the highest prices ever paid for a mosaic piece of art - with proceeds going to Cancer Research UK.
