= Darwen Library =

Library in Darwen, England

Coordinates: 53.6967°N 2.4660°W

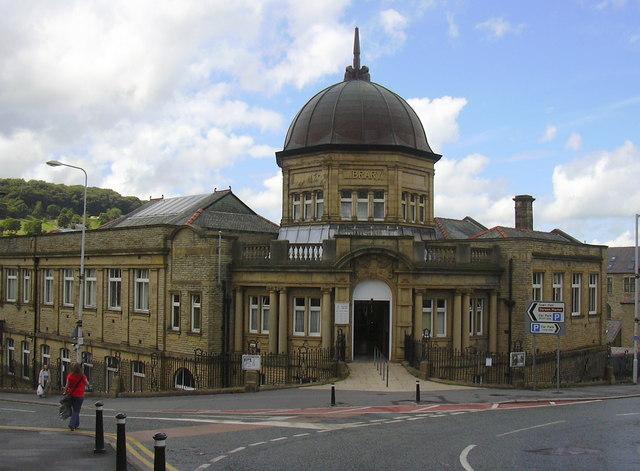
- Location: Darwen, Lancashire
- Established: 1908

Other information
- Website: https://www.blackburn.gov.uk/Pages/Darwen-library.aspx

Darwen Library is a Carnegie library in Darwen, Lancashire, England. It opened in 1908 and is located on Knott Street.

== History ==
The library was officially opened in May 1908 by Andrew Carnegie, who had donated £8,000 to build it. It has continued to provide book-lending services to members of the local community.

=== Centenary of library ===
As part of the library's centenary celebrations in 2008, the library ran a number of events throughout May. In April 2008, local brewers Fallons Exquisite Ales announced they had created a new beer and were dedicating it to the library.
