= John Leach (footballer) =

English footballer (1866–1931)

Personal information
- Full name: John Ralph Leach
- Date of birth: 12 May 1866
- Place of birth: Darwen, England
- Date of death: 1931 (aged 64–65)
- Position: Defender

Senior career*
Years	Team	Apps	(Gls)
1891–1898	Darwen	176	(7)
- * Club domestic league appearances and goals

John Ralph Leach (12 May 1866 – 1931) was an English footballer who played in the Football League for Darwen.
