= Darwen Town Council =

Parish council in Darwen, Lancashire, England

- Logo

Type
- Type: Parish council

History
- Founded: 2 April 2009; 17 years ago

Leadership
- Mayor: Jonathan Hamer, (Labour)
- Leader: Anthony Shaw, (Labour)
- Clerk: Rebecca Hay, (non-political post)

Structure
- Seats: 13 councillors
- Political groups: Labour Party: 12 seats Conservative Party: 1 seat
- Length of term: Whole council elected every four years

Elections
- Voting system: First-past-the-post
- Last election: 2 May 2024
- Next election: TBA

Meeting place
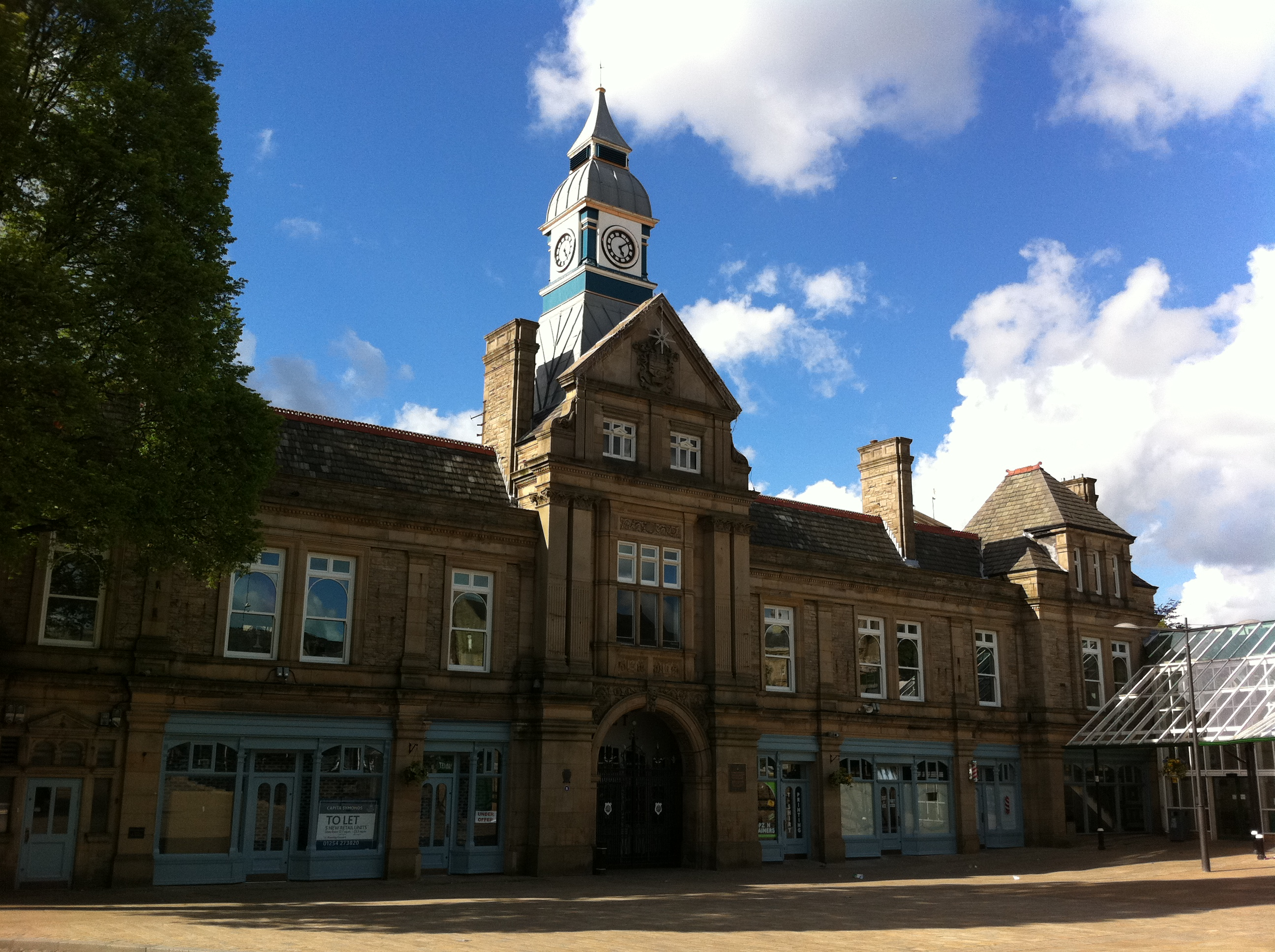
- Darwen Town Hall

Website
- darwentowncouncil.gov.uk

Darwen Town Council is the parish council covering the town of Darwen, England. It serves 27,200 residents. The council has its headquarters at Darwen Town Hall.

== History ==
On 16 October 2008 a referendum was held in Darwen on the creation of a town council. Of the 20,495 electors eligible to vote, a total of 4,198 took part in the referendum. The result of the referendum was as follows: 2,378 voted yes, 1,725 (8.42%) voted no, 95 ballot papers were rejected and turnout was 20.49%.

In December, following the referendum Blackburn with Darwen Borough Council approved the creation of the council. the council was created on 2 April 2009 with the first election in June.

== Responsibilities ==
The town council receives funding by levying a "precept" on the council tax paid by the residents of the civil parish. The council runs events and projects to promote Darwen and also provide funding in the community for projects and parks.

== Political control ==
Party in control	Years
For Darwen	2009–2012
Labour	2012–2021
No overall control	2021–2024
Labour	2024–present

At the first elections to the council in June 2009, the For Darwen Party took control, winning 7 seats, the Liberal Democrats won 4 and the Conservative Party and Labour Party won one each. At the second election in May 2012 For Darwen lost all their seats with Labour taking control with 8 seats to the Lib Dems 5. In the 2016 elections Labour won 7, Lib Dems 4 and Conservatives 2.

In the 6 May 2021 election seats were as follows; 5 Labour, 4, Conservative and 4 Lib Dem.

On the 2 May 2024 elections, Labour took back firm control by winning 12 of the 13 seats with the Conservatives winning the other remaining seat.

== Wards and Councillors ==
Since 2009, Darwen is served by a Town Council, which since 2018 is divided into 4 Wards, 3 of which are represented by four town councillors and the other by one town councillor.

Current town council
Ward	Councillor	Party
Darwen East	Julie Dugan	Labour
Darwen East	Matt Gibson	Labour
Darwen East	Martin McCaughran	Labour
Darwen East	Mark Westall	Labour
Darwen South	Liam Dobson	Labour
Darwen South	Paul O'Garr	Labour
Darwen South	Anthony Shaw	Labour
Darwen South	Sue Skipper	Labour
Darwen South Rural	Steve Duncan	Conservative
Darwen West	Stephanie Brookfield	Labour
Darwen West	Jonathan Hamer	Labour
Darwen West	Dave Smith	Labour
Darwen West	Brian Taylor	Labour

== Elections ==
Labour: 12 seats Conservative: 1 seat

=== 2024 ===
==== Darwen East ====
Darwen East (4 councillors)
Party	Candidate	Votes	%	±%
Labour	Martin McCaughran	771		
Labour	Julie Dugan	719		
Labour	Matt Gibson	688		
Labour	Mark Westall	645		
Independent	Paul Browne	477		
Independent	Mark Davies	422		
Conservative	Ryan Slater	302		
Spoilt Ballots	—	6	—	—
Turnout		4,030	20.96	
Labour hold		Swing		
Labour gain from Liberal Democrats		Swing		
Labour gain from Liberal Democrats		Swing		
Labour gain from Liberal Democrats		Swing		

==== Darwen South ====
Darwen South (4 councillors)
Party	Candidate	Votes	%	±%
Labour	Anthony Shaw	947		
Labour	Sue Skipper	883		
Labour	Liam Dobson	870		
Labour	Paul O'Garr	862		
Conservative	Kevin Connor	786		
Conservative	Neil Slater	753		
Conservative	Lilian Salton	729		
Conservative	Joan Hepple	689		
Spoilt Ballots	—	28	—	—
Turnout		6,547	28.58	
Labour gain from Conservative		Swing		
Labour gain from Conservative		Swing		
Labour gain from Conservative		Swing		
Labour gain from Conservative		Swing		

==== Darwen South Rural ====
Darwen South Rural (1 councillor)
Party	Candidate	Votes	%	±%
Conservative	Steve Duncan	263		
Labour	Simon Charlesworth	188		
Spoilt Ballots	—	13	—	—
Turnout		464	31.52	
Conservative gain from Liberal Democrats		Swing		

==== Darwen West ====
Darwen West (4 councillors)
Party	Candidate	Votes	%	±%
Labour	David Smith	1,212		
Labour	Brian Taylor	1,212		
Labour	Stephanie Brookfield	1,029		
Labour	Jonathan Hamer	984		
Conservative	Jacqueline Slater	419		
Spoilt Ballots	—	12	—	—
Turnout		4,868	28.50	
Labour hold		Swing		
Labour hold		Swing		
Labour hold		Swing		
Labour hold		Swing		

Labour: 5 seats Conservative: 4 seats Liberal Democrats: 4 seats

=== 2021 ===
==== Darwen East ====
Darwen East (4 councillors)
Party	Candidate	Votes	%	±%
Labour	Eileen Entwistle	853		
Liberal Democrats	Roy Davies	838		
Liberal Democrats	Paul Browne	688		
Liberal Democrats	Mark Davies	666		
Labour	Martin McCaughran	663		
Labour	Liz Johnson	569		
Liberal Democrats	Simon Huggill	558		
Labour	Steven Johnson	550		
Spoilt Ballots	—	44	—	—
Turnout		5,524	26.78	
Labour win (new seat)				
Liberal Democrats win (new seat)				
Liberal Democrats win (new seat)				
Liberal Democrats win (new seat)				

==== Darwen South ====
Darwen South (4 councillors)
Party	Candidate	Votes	%	±%
Conservative	Kevin Connor	1,026		
Conservative	Neil Slater	1,003		
Conservative	Lilian Salton	988		
Conservative	Andrew Walker	975		
Labour	Sarah Rose	586		
Labour	Matt Gibson	572		
Labour	Laura Higab	518		
Liberal Democrats	Joan Hepple	426		
Labour	Jude Rowley	404		
Spoilt Ballots	—	15	—	—
Turnout		6,513	31.30	
Conservative win (new seat)				
Conservative win (new seat)				
Conservative win (new seat)				
Conservative win (new seat)				

==== Darwen South Rural ====
Darwen South Rural (1 councillor)
Party	Candidate	Votes	%	±%
Liberal Democrats	John East	425		
Labour	Matt Jackson	94		
Spoilt Ballots	—	21	—	—
Turnout		540	36.50	
Liberal Democrats win (new seat)				

==== Darwen West ====
Darwen West (4 councillors)
Party	Candidate	Votes	%	±%
Labour	David Smith	1,171		
Labour	Brian Taylor	1,113		
Labour	Stephanie Brookfield	990		
Labour	Jonathan Hamer	923		
Conservative	Lynn Perkins	735		
Conservative	Janine Crook	883		
Conservative	Rob Toner	669		
Conservative	Ryan Slater	664		
Spoilt Ballots	—	18	—	—
Turnout		7,166	33.90	
Labour win (new seat)				
Labour win (new seat)				
Labour win (new seat)				
Labour win (new seat)				

== Mayors ==
List of mayors of Darwen
Tenure	Name	Party	Notes
2009–2012	Paul Browne	Liberal Democrats	
2012–2016	Eileen Entwistle	Labour	
2016–2017	Brian Taylor	Labour	
2017-2019	Roy Davies	Liberal Democrats	
2019–2022	Lillian Salton	Conservative	
2022–2026	Stephanie Brookfield	Labour	
2026–present	Jonathan Hamer	Labour	

== Leaders ==
List of leaders of Darwen
Tenure	Name	Party	Notes
2009–2010	Phil Jones	For Darwen	
2010	Trevor Maxfield	For Darwen	
2010–2012	Steve Duncan	Liberal Democrats	
2012-2017	Trevor Maxfield	Labour	
2017–2024	Kevin Conner	Conservative	
2024–2026	Jonathan Hamer	Labour	
2026–present	Anthony Shaw	Labour	
