= Darwen Town Hall =

Municipal building in Darwen, Lancashire, England

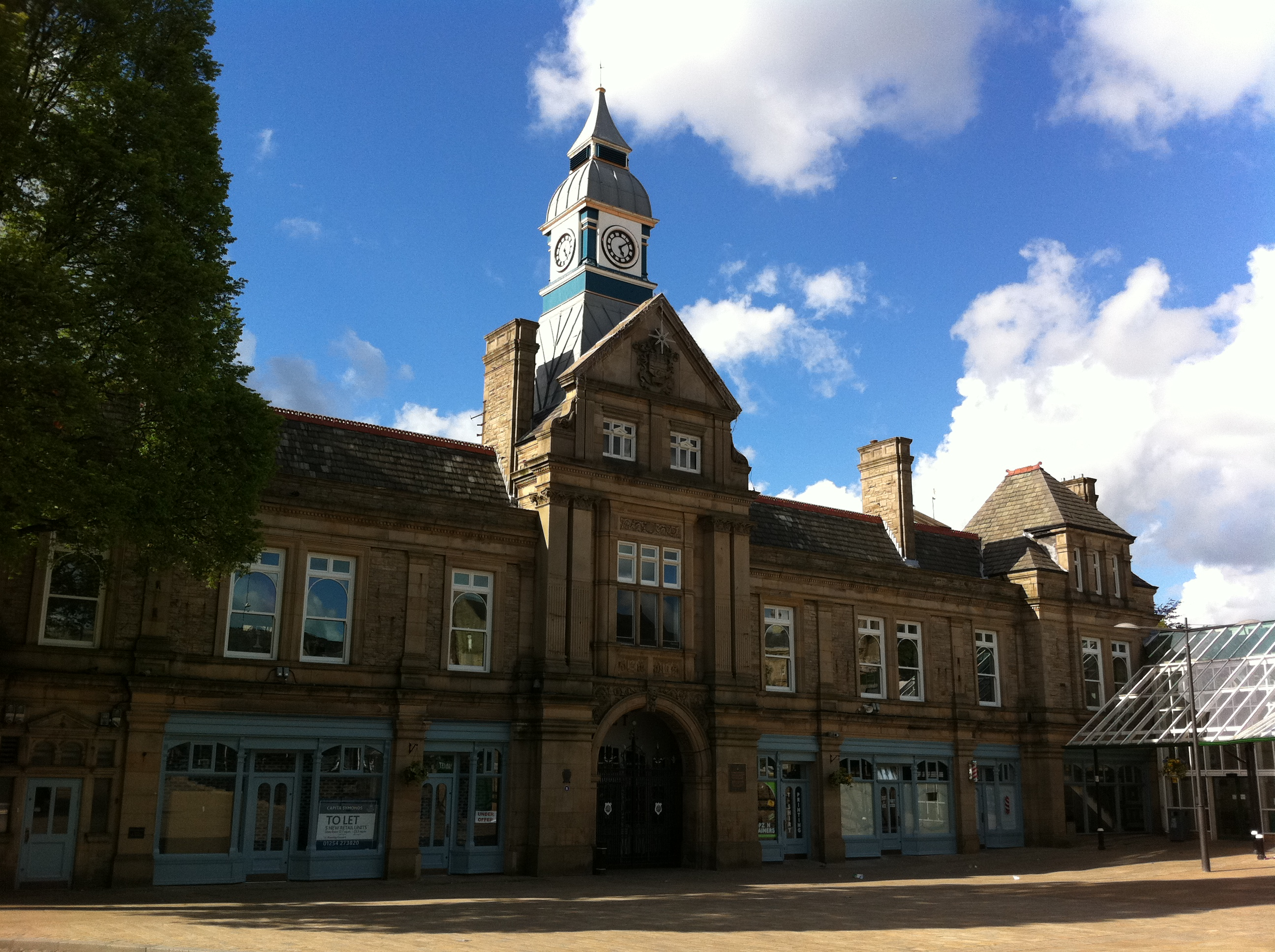
- Darwen Town Hall

- Shown in Lancashire Location in Borough of Blackburn with Darwen
- 53.6960°N 2.4670°W
- Location: Croft Street, Darwen

History
- Built: 1882

Site notes
- Architect: Charles Bell
- Architectural style: Neoclassical style

Darwen Town Hall is a municipal building in Croft Street, Darwen, Lancashire, England. It is the meeting place of Darwen Town Council.

== History ==
After significant population growth in the second half of the 19th century, particularly associated with the textile industry, Darwen became a municipal borough in March 1878. Civic leaders decided it was necessary to procure a town hall and a market hall: the original concept was to have two separate structures but after some debate civic leaders decided to have a combined facility. The site they selected was a piece of derelict and marshy land traversed by the River Darwen and owned by the Reverend Charles Greenway.

The scheme was subject to a design competition which was supervised by Alfred Waterhouse and won by Charles Bell. The finance for the scheme was authorised under the Over Darwen Improvement Act 1879 and, after the River Darwen had been diverted into an underground culvert, the foundation stone for the new building was laid by the mayor, Alderman William Snape on 2 October 1880. The structure was built by a local contractor, J. Orrel & Sons, and the building was officially opened by the local member of parliament, Frederick Grafton on 21 June 1882. (Note: Grafton was standing in for the Secretary of State for India, the Marquess of Hartington, who had been scheduled to open the building but was called to a Cabinet Meeting at short notice.)

The design involved a symmetrical main frontage with thirteen bays facing onto the Croft Street with the end bays slightly projected forward and topped with mansard roofs; the central bay, which also slightly projected forward, featured an arched doorway on the ground floor with a triple sash window flanked by pairs of Corinthian order pilasters on the first floor, two smaller windows on the second floor and a pediment containing the town's coat of arms above. There was a small tower with a dome and weather vane at roof level. Internally, the principal rooms were the council chamber, the council offices and the fish market. An hour-striking clock by Potts of Leeds, paid for by the mayor, Dr James Ballantyne, was installed in the tower in 1899. In the 1920s part of the site, to the south west of the main building, was released for use as a bus station.

The building served as the headquarters of Darwen Borough Council for much of the 20th century but ceased to be the local seat of government when the enlarged Blackburn with Darwen Borough Council was formed in 1974. A new fish annex, located to the north east of the main building, opened in February 1969 and a new hexagonal structure, with space for 66 market traders, located to the south east of the main building, was completed in October 1975. The council chamber was converted for use as a magistrates' court in 1983 and remained in that use until 1992.

The town hall continued to be used as workspace by some departments of Blackburn with Darwen Borough Council and by the local Neighbourhood Policing Team. Meanwhile, the council chamber became the home of Darwen Town Council when it was formed in 2009. A scheme, funded by the Heritage Lottery Fund, which saw five small retail units re-instated on the ground floor of the main building was completed in July 2011.

Works of art in the town hall include a mural by an unknown artist which celebrates the centenary of the Darwen Jubilee Tower which had been built in 1898.
