= Darwen Aldridge Enterprise Studio =

Location
- Police St; Darwen, Lancashire, BB3 1AF; England; 53.6962°N 2.4707°W

Information
- Type: Studio School
- Established: 2013
- Department for Education URN: 139924 Tables
- Ofsted: Reports
- Principal: Colin Grand
- Staff: too many
- Gender: Mixed
- Age: 13 to 19
- Capacity: 1000
- Website: http://www.daestudio.biz/

Darwen Aldridge Enterprise Studio (DAES) is a mixed studio school located in Lancashire, UK. It opened in September 2013. It is part of the Aldridge Education multi-academy trust.

The school offers GCSEs and A Levels with a focus on creative digital, health and child-care and business-related subjects. These are delivered through real commercial business based projects. Students also receive professional work placements.

== Location ==
In 2014 DAES moved into the former Model Lodging House in Police Street, Darwen, following a £4.1m refurbishment and extension.

== History ==
Proposals to open the school were officially approved by the Department for Education in July 2012. The Studio initially opened within sister school Darwen Aldridge Community Academy buildings before moving to new facilities in September 2014 in Police Street. The site underwent a £4.1m refurbishment and extension to turn the historic former lodging house into a school.

== Ofsted Results ==
Ofsted awarded Darwen Aldridge Enterprise Studio a 'Good' rating in March 2015.
