= Earcroft =

- ward
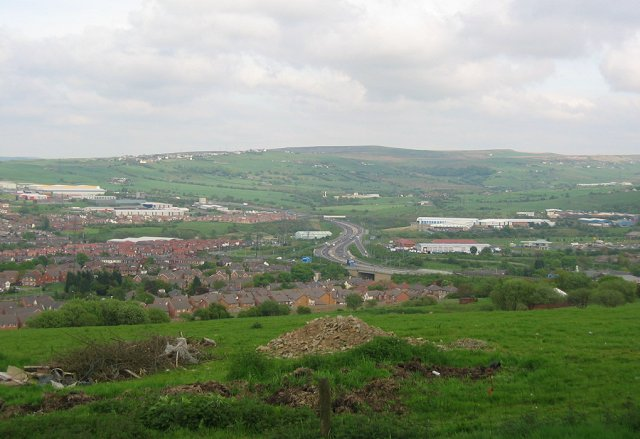
- Earcroft
- Interactive map of Earcroft
- Coordinates: 53°42′26″N 2°29′14.2″W
- Country: England
- County: Lancashire
- Borough: Blackburn with Darwen

Earcroft is the northern ward in the town of Darwen, Lancashire, England. It borders Blackburn on the A666.

It has a mix of residential, manufacturing and retail areas, and is serviced by both the A666 and the M65 Junction 4.

It is also home to the Darwen Golf Club, A.F.C. Darwen (successor to Darwen F.C.) and Darwen Cricket Club.
