= Travis D. Frain =

British anti-terrorism campaigner

Travis D. Frain OBE BCA DL

Deputy Lieutenant for Lancashire
- Incumbent
- Assumed office November 2024
- Appointed by: Amanda Parker JP
- Monarch: HM King Charles III

Personal details
- Born: Travis Dylan Frain; 1998 (age 27–28) Darwen, Lancashire, England
- Education: Edge Hill University; Lancaster University
- Awards: Officer of the Most Excellent Order of the British Empire

Travis Dylan Frain OBE BCA DL (born 1998) is an English counter-extremism campaigner from Lancashire, who survived the 2017 Westminster Bridge terrorist attack. After recovering from injuries sustained in the attack, he became an advocate for victims of terrorism and fighting against violent extremism. In November 2024, he was commissioned as the youngest Deputy Lord-Lieutenant, a personal representative of the Monarch, in the United Kingdom.

== Early life and education ==
Frain was born in 1998 and was raised in Darwen, Lancashire. During his undergraduate studies at Edge Hill University, Frain travelled to London on a study trip with course-mates organised by the university. Whilst on the trip, he and his friends were injured when they were hit by a vehicle driven by an Islamic terrorist, Khalid Masood. The attacker killed five people, and injured over fifty. Frain sustained fractures to his leg and hand.

== Career ==
Over the years following the terrorist attack on Westminster Bridge, Frain has served across a number of roles within the British national security space, primarily across the Counter Terrorism Policing network. These include as an Advisor, Ambassador, and National Chair of their Counter Terrorism Youth Advisory Group.

In January 2018, Frain was one of six British survivors of terrorism who co-founded the charity Survivors Against Terror in order to proactively campaign for improvements in state support provided to victims of terrorism and lobby Government for the requisite changes.

In March 2021, Frain joined other survivors in campaigning for a plaque in commemoration of the event to be installed at Westminster Bridge.

In November 2021, Frain founded the Resilience in Unity Project, an organisation aimed at preventing the proliferation of online extremist content spread during the COVID19 Pandemic. Their launch event was supported by The Countess of Wessex, General The Lord Dannatt, former Chief of the General Staff of the British Army, and Matt Jukes, Head of Counter Terrorism Policing. The Project records the testimonies of victims of terrorism worldwide and crafts these into counter-narrative resources that can be used by schools, colleges, and other interested parties to raise awareness of the impacts of violent extremism on those most intimately affected. They also organise events and discussions to enable survivors of terrorism with opportunities to become involved in counterterrorism work should they wish to do so.

As a result of his work, he has been called upon as an expert by the Council of Europe, United Nations, and the UK Parliament, and has given statements at several conferences.

Frain has also voiced support for several charities operating within the space of emergency preparedness and resilience-building. These include RAPAID, a charity distributing emergency bleed-control kits to forms of black cab taxis and crowded places, and the National Emergencies Trust, a charity with the patronage of The Prince of Wales, that collates and distributes public fundraising to those worst affected in the event of a domestic emergency or disaster.

In addition to his advocacy and work in counterterrorism, Frain has also worked for several universities, teaching on terrorism and national security. These include Edge Hill University, The University of Salford, teaching Greater Manchester Police recruits, and the University of Central Lancashire.

== Honours and awards ==
Frain was nominated for a National Crimebeat Award by the High Sheriff of Lancashire, Edwin Booth, in 2022. He received second place, and was presented with the award by the serving Commissioner of the Police of the Metropolis, Dame Cressida Dick QPM.

In 2023, Frain was included on the British Citizen Award Roll of Honour and was entitled to use the postnominals of 'BCA' in recognition of the award after being presented with his medal at a ceremony in the House of Lords.

Frain was appointed an Officer of the Most Excellent Order of the British Empire (OBE) by King Charles III in his 2024 New Years' Honours List for services to counter-extremism and to victims of terrorism, and was commissioned as Deputy Lord-Lieutenant of Lancashire by Amanda Parker JP in November 2024, after receiving non-disapproval from the Monarch.
