= Cowley International College =

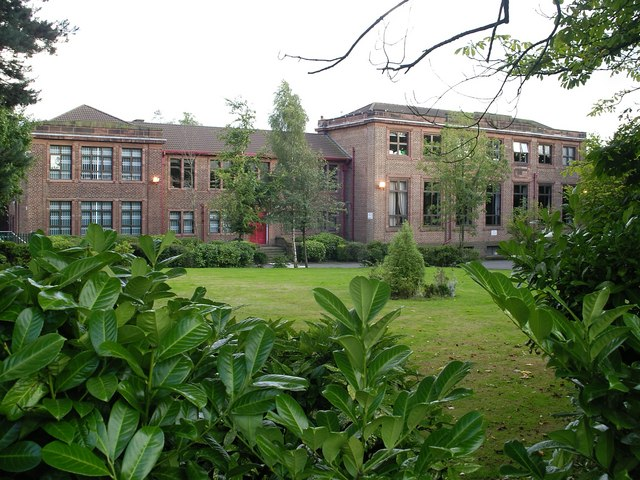

Location
- Hard Lane; St. Helens, Merseyside, WA10 6LB; England
- Coordinates: 53.464646°N 2.756110°W

Information
- Type: Comprehensive school. Soon to be Academy in late 2024.
- Motto: Non sibi sed omnibus
- Established: 1716
- Founder: Sarah Cowley
- Local authority: St. Helens
- Department for Education URN: 104829 Tables
- Ofsted: Reports
- Principal: R Cormack
- Gender: Mixed
- Age: 11 to 18
- Enrolment: 1590
- Website: http://www.cowley.st-helens.sch.uk

Cowley International College, formerly Cowley Language College and originally Cowley School, is an 11-18 secondary school located on Cowley Hill, in Windle, St Helens, Merseyside.

== History ==
=== Grammar school ===
A former part of the school was on Cowley Hill Lane. There were two grammar schools, the Cowley Girls' Secondary Grammar School (also known as the Cowley Girls' School) with around 650 girls, and Cowley Boys' Secondary Grammar School (also known as Cowley School) with around 550 boys. In 1965, the St Helens Education Committee council introduced proposals for comprehensive education.

The changing rooms at the boys' school, and the gym at the girls' school were used as locations for the film Chariots of Fire (1981).

=== Comprehensive ===
The comprehensive plans took effect in September 1970 with each school becoming a 13-18 single sex comprehensive school - the Cowley Boys' School and Cowley Girls' School which soon became 11-18 schools in 1974 with around 700 at each school. For a short time from 1976 to 1978, these schools were the Cowley High School for Boys and the Cowley High School for Girls. By 1978 it had become the Cowley High School with around 1,400 boys and girls.

In 2001, it gained Language College specialist status and changed its name. In the summer of 2010 the school changed its name once again to Cowley International College.

=== Academy conversion ===
In May 2024 it was proposed Cowley International College would close and reopen as an academy by September 2024. However, by 2025 the academy proposal was put on hold, and the school remains local authority run.

== New building ==
The school has recently been subject to a £20 million redevelopment, with a new building for the 11-16 site opened in October 2009 by Ed Balls, Head of Education. The previous site is currently being redeveloped into a state-of-the-art Sixth Form which opened to students in September 2010.

== Notable former pupils ==
=== Cowley School (Grammar, High and College) ===
- Sir Hugh Stott Taylor (1890-1974), Professor of Chemistry, Princeton University
- Walter H. Longton First World War flying ace
- George Groves (1901-1976), sound engineer
- Winifred Frost (1902-1979), freshwater biologist
- Sir Harold Macdonald Steward (1904-1977), consulting engineer and Conservative Party politician
- Jack Heaton (1912–1998), rugby player
- Robert Dorning (1913-1989), actor, musician
- Gerry Pickavance (1915-1991), director of the Rutherford High Energy Lab
- Theo Barker (1923-2001), professor of economic and social history
- Geoff Duke (1923-2015), racing motorcyclist during the 1950s
- Ray French (born 1939), rugby player and commentator
- Margaret Chapman (1940-2000), artist and illustrator
- Geoff Pimblett (born 1944), rugby player
- Gary Stretch (born 1965), boxer
- Tim Jonkers (born 1981), rugby player
- James Roby (born 1985), rugby player
- Adam Swift (born 1993), rugby player

== Notable masters ==
- Leonard Brockington (1888-1966), Classics and English Master at the School, later the first head of the Canadian Broadcasting Corporation
- Isaac Shapiro (1904-2004), lecturer in English at Birmingham University
- Watcyn Thomas (1906–77), a Welsh rugby union player
- Roland Mathias (1915-2007), poet
- Viv Harrison (1921-1989), teacher and rugby player
- Derek Norcross (1930-2006), later headmaster of St Paul's Church of England School (East Sussex), Deputy Lieutenant of East Sussex
- Ray French (born 1939), BBC rugby league commentator, also taught at the school
- Mike Bennett (rugby league)
