= Margaret Chapman =

English painter

- Born: Eileen Margaret Duxbury; 18 November 1940; Darwen, United Kingdom
- Died: 28 July 2000 (aged 59); Birkdale, United Kingdom
- Known for: Painting, illustration
- Notable work: Pretty Polly (1976); The New Rover (1973)
- Website: www.margaretchapmanart.com

Eileen Margaret Chapman (née Duxbury; 18 November 1940 – 28 July 2000) was an English illustrator and painter. Born in Darwen, Lancashire, her skill at painting was obvious from an early age, and she studied at Liverpool College of Art alongside Stuart Sutcliffe (with whom she competed for 'best painter in class') and John Lennon. Her work was often reproduced as limited edition prints and sold in more than fifty countries.

== Career ==
Her oil and gouache paintings often featured Edwardian street scenes, usually in the north of England, and drew favourable comparisons with L. S. Lowry, with whom she was often thought to be a contemporary despite being more than fifty years younger. Chapman's work is often more detailed, with many works featuring billboards selling products of the Edwardian Period such as Bovril, Cadbury's confectionary, and Oxo. She matched Lowry for prices in the early/mid-1970s, and interest in her work has steadily increased more than a decade after her death.

Well-known works include 'Piccadilly Circus', 'The New Rover', and 'Pretty Polly', with typically busy crowds fascinated with a snake oil salesman or itinerant gas iron seller.

In 1978, she published a book of her paintings called When Steak was a Shilling a Pound, which included her own prose and thoughts on the Edwardian period.

== Personal life ==
She was married in 1965 and had four children. Her great-uncle was Charles Lightoller, who was second officer of the RMS Titanic and a survivor of its sinking.

While studying at art college and living at nearby Gambier Terrace, she recalled a young Paul McCartney and George Harrison coming in through an upstairs window via a back fire escape to rehearse with her flatmate John Lennon. She introduced Lennon to J.D. Salinger's novel The Catcher in the Rye while they were students in Liverpool, where she was affectionately called 'Duckie'.

== Early life ==
Eileen Margaret Duxbury was born on 18 November 1940 at Durham Road, Darwen, Lancashire, the second child to parents Ethel Duxbury (née Pearson; 1911–1992), a seamstress, and Alan Holt Duxbury (1906–1955), chief accountant for the North West Gas Board. Ethel recalled how the birth was during an air raid over the cotton mill town, and a neighbour suggested she call her daughter 'Sirena' as sirens had been wailing when Margaret was born. She had an older sister, Kathleen Mavis (1938–2004).

The family lived in Darwen for a number of years, where there were many aunts and uncles and Ethel's parents James and Bertha, until Alan Duxbury's accountancy job took them first to Stalybridge and then St Helens.

Chapman recalled her childhood in an interview on BBC1's Look North (now BBC North West Tonight) in 1977, saying "It was such a contrast, or seemed to me as a child, to move from the soot-blackened factories and terraced houses of Darwen to the relative luxury of a semi-detached in the suburbs, which is what happened when my father's work took us there. I think those early cotton mill town days and the hard-working folk rushing to work I saw every day made a lasting impression upon me. It wasn't until a long time later that I attempted to capture the spirit of that busy movement and activity in paintings."

== Education ==
Chapman was a gifted student, showing ability in maths and English as well as art. She passed her 11-plus examination a year early and was enrolled at Cowley School in St Helens.

Chapman said of her first day at the school: "I was terrified, literally shaking with fear, every girl was bigger than me it seemed and I had no friends at all. I cried in private."

== Early career ==
By 1970, after five years of marriage and with three young children, she decided to take up painting seriously again. She was motivated to record something of the local Lancashire townscapes, which were undergoing big changes as a result of town planning.

She was attracted to the lifestyle of an earlier age, particularly the Edwardian period, respecting the strength of character and traditions of ordinary folk from that time, despite their privations. She was meticulous in recording the period accurately in her work, in terms of the figures' clothing, billboards and buildings as these provided the rich content and context for which she became renowned.

Her skill in the medium was soon apparent and easily recognised from its distinctive style, and it wasn't long before her work was noticed as a result of small exhibitions in local libraries in Darwen and Blackburn. This provided the opportunity for her first major exhibition of more than 30 paintings in Manchester. This first exhibition was an opening-night sell-out, which would become a common occurrence at future shows, some of which attended by contemporary artists such as L. S. Lowry and Vladimir Tretchikoff.

== Mid-career success ==
By 1974 Chapman was selling for as much as fellow-Lancastrian L. S. Lowry and topping £1,000 per picture. The Guardian newspaper famously headlined a London auction of northern artists with: "Mrs Chapman Gives Lowry a run for his money". Anything she painted was sold more or less immediately, with clients from all over the world requesting works. As a result, most of her original work was sold before reaching her audience, and consequently she had few exhibitions.

This presented her with an ideal situation, as it allowed her to maintain an orderly family life – with four children under eight by 1973 – and let her paintings and drawings speak for themselves.

She featured regularly on local and national TV, memorably on the BBC's The Succeeders in 1972, a series which also featured Wigan Athletic F.C. owner Dave Whelan, on individuals who were at the height of their profession and likely to be so in the future. Her paintings were also regularly shown in national and international press.

She painted consistently, often prolifically throughout the 1970s. As her style became more well known, she was invited to authorise reproductions of her best known work, to give her countless fans worldwide an opportunity to enjoy her art. Famous collectors included ex-England football captain Jimmy Armfield and several members of the Coronation Street cast. Some of her most famous paintings were published as limited editions and some brought together with her original text, in illustrated books When Steak Was A Shilling A Pound and In Great Great Grandmother's Day.
