= Blackburn Central High School =

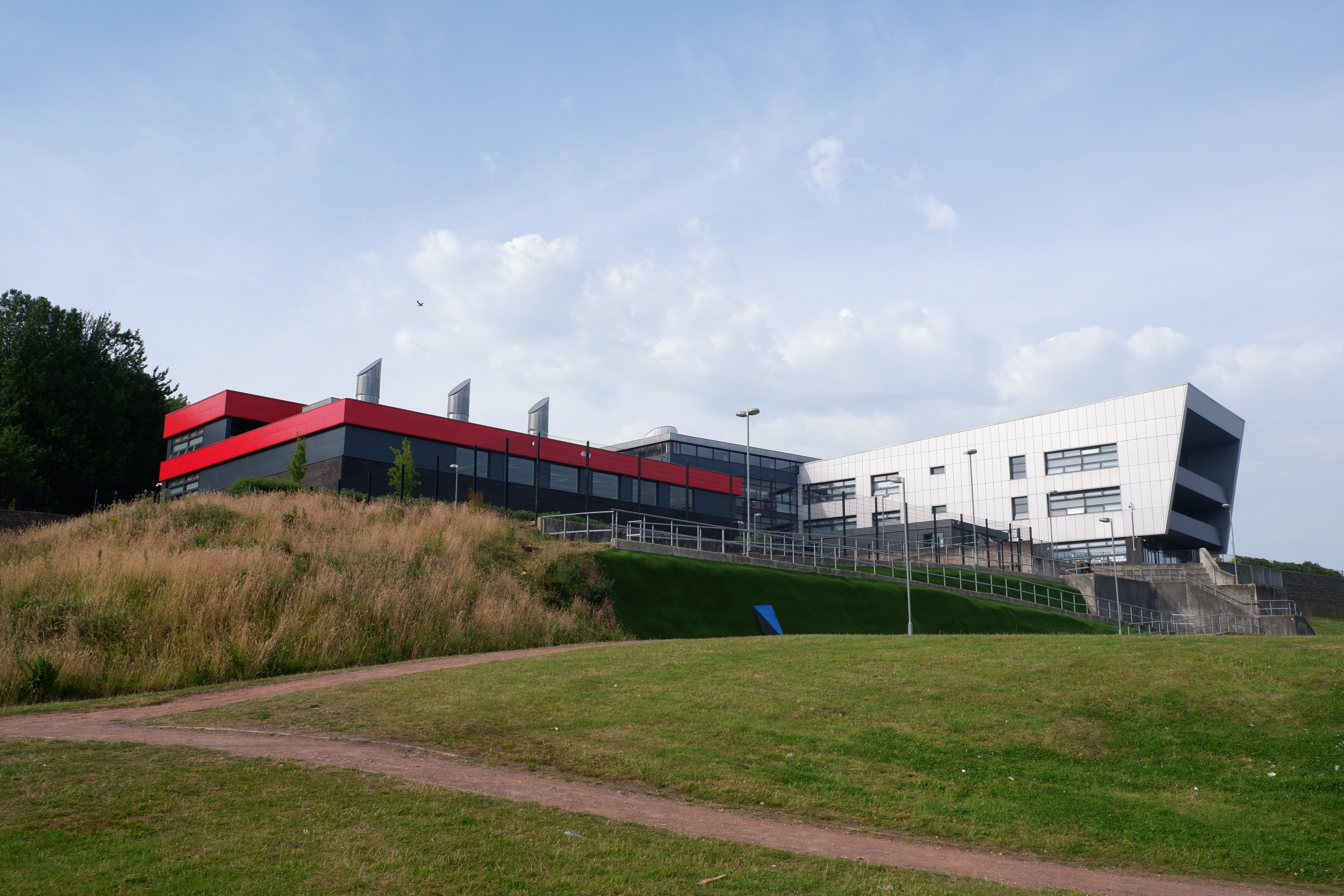

Location
- Haslingden Road; Blackburn; Blackburn, Lancashire, BB2 3HJ; England
- 53.73847°N 2.46829°W

Information
- Type: Academy
- Motto: Aspire and achieve
- School district: Blackburn with Darwen
- Local authority: Blackburn with Darwen
- Trust: Champion Education Trust
- Department for Education URN: 146936 Tables
- Ofsted: Reports
- Trust Leader: Diane Atkinson
- Headteacher: William Clements
- Gender: Co-educational
- Age: 11 to 16
- Website: https://www.bchs.co.uk/

Blackburn Central High School is a co-educational secondary school located in Blackburn, Lancashire.

The school was formed from the merger of William Clements and relocated to a new combined campus in September 2012. Construction of the new school site was funded by the Building Schools for the Future programme. Previously a foundation school administered by Blackburn with Darwen Borough Council, in October 2019 Blackburn Central High School converted to academy status and is now sponsored by the Champion Education Trust.

Blackburn Central High School offers GCSEs as programmes of study for pupils.

Until 2022, the school shared a campus with Crosshill Special School. Crosshill Special School relocated to their own premises in Darwen in January 2022.

== Performance ==
In a Full Inspection in 2012 Ofsted rated Blackburn Central High School to be 'Good', during a Short Inspection in 2017, Ofsted judged that the school continued to be 'Good'.

== Awards ==
In 2021, Blackburn Central High School was awarded 'The Renee Black Integration Award' at The Community Volunteer Awards. In 2022, Blackburn Central High School was awarded 'The Together Award' at the BBC Radio Lancashire Make a Difference Awards.
