= Alan Bolton (cricketer) =

English cricketer

Alan Bolton (1 July 1939 – 1 January 2003) was an English cricketer active from 1956 to 1963 who played for Lancashire. He was born in Darwen and died in Keighley. He appeared in 40 first-class matches as a righthanded batsman who bowled right arm off break. He scored 1,223 runs with a highest score of 96 and held 15 catches. He took two wickets with a best analysis of one for 13.
