= Darwen Aldridge Community Academy =

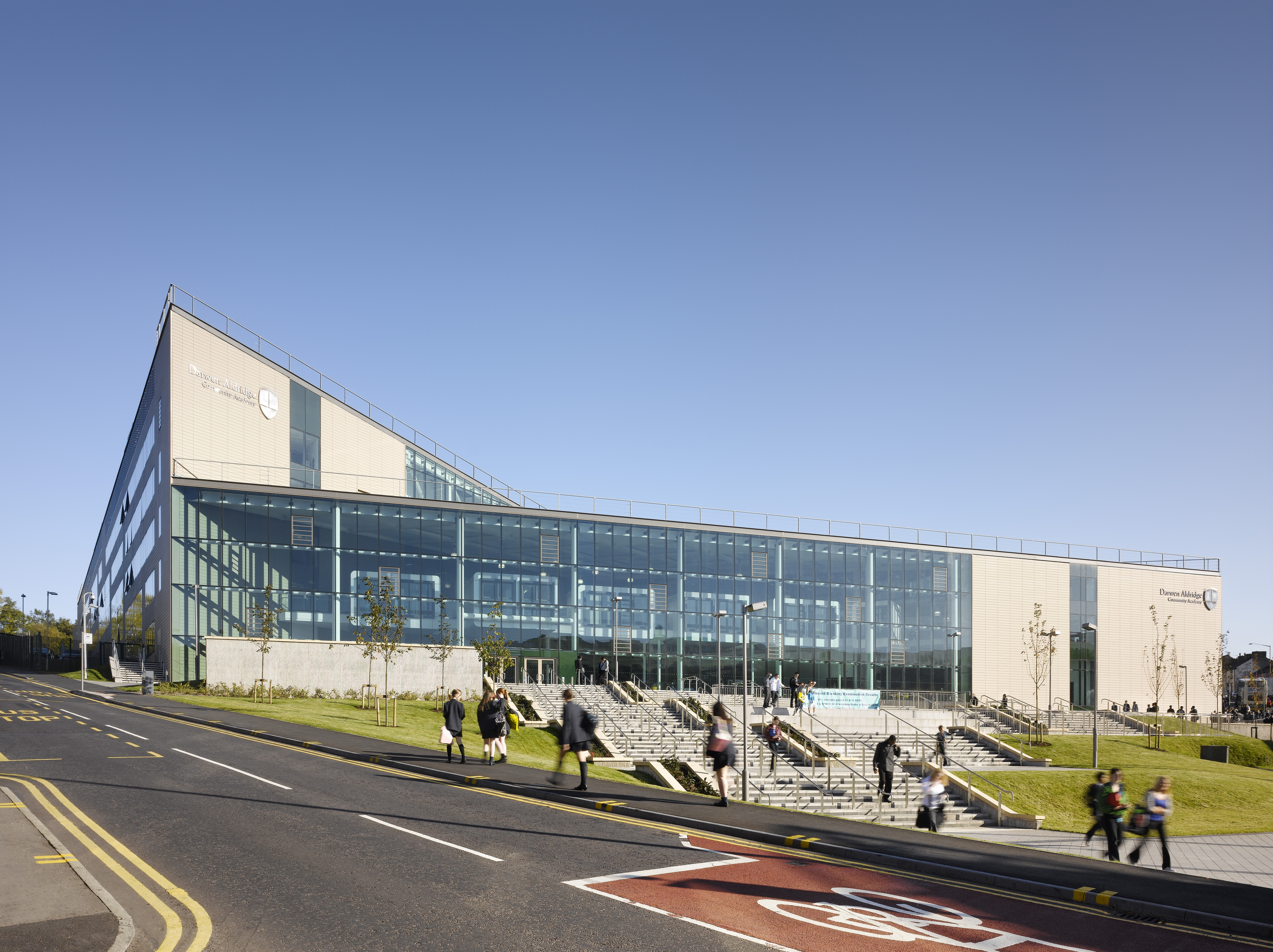
- The academy seen from Redearth Road

Location
- Sudell Road; Darwen, Lancashire, BB3 3HD; England; 53.694°N 2.464°W

Information
- Type: Academy
- Established: 2 September 2008; 17 years ago
- Department for Education URN: 135580 Tables
- Ofsted: Reports
- Principal: Claire Bailey
- Gender: Mixed
- Age: 11 to 19
- Enrolment: 1,400
- Capacity: 1,600
- Website: www.daca.uk.com

Darwen Aldridge Community Academy (DACA) is a secondary school and sixth form with academy status in the Blackburn with Darwen borough of Lancashire, England. It specialises in entrepreneurship and is part of the Aldridge Education Multi Academy Trust.

== History ==
Darwen Aldridge Communuity Academy replaced Darwen Moorland High School in September 2008, opening on the site of the former school at Holden Fold (53.70423°N 2.45873°W). The academy is sponsored by the Aldridge Foundation and was officially opened by the foundation chairman, Sir Rod Aldridge, on 16 October 2008. Brendan Loughran was appointed the school's first principal.

The academy moved to a new purpose-built site in September 2010, located in the Redearth area at the centre of Darwen. The new site features a five-storey main building, a sports hall, a dance/drama studio, a café and office spaces for young entrepreneurs. It was designed by architecture firm Aedas.

The new school cost an estimated £49 million, with the controversial clearance of houses in the area of Redearth involving the council in a long legal dispute, including a hearing by the High Court and two public inquiries. Prince William and Catherine Middleton visited the new school to formally open it on 11 April 2011 as part of their final public engagement before their wedding.

== GCSE results ==
The school saw 57% of students achieve five or more GCSEs at an A* to C Grade in August 2015, which was up from 52% the previous year.

== Ofsted ratings ==
In its inspection by Ofsted by in January 2013, the school was rated as good overall. The previous inspection in January 2011 had rated the school satisfactory.

== Notable former pupils ==
- Neil Arthur, singer of the 1980s synth band Blancmange
- Rhiannon Clements, actress (Hollyoaks)
