= Darwen =

Town in Lancashire, England

Coordinates: 53.698°N 2.461°W

- Market town and civil parish
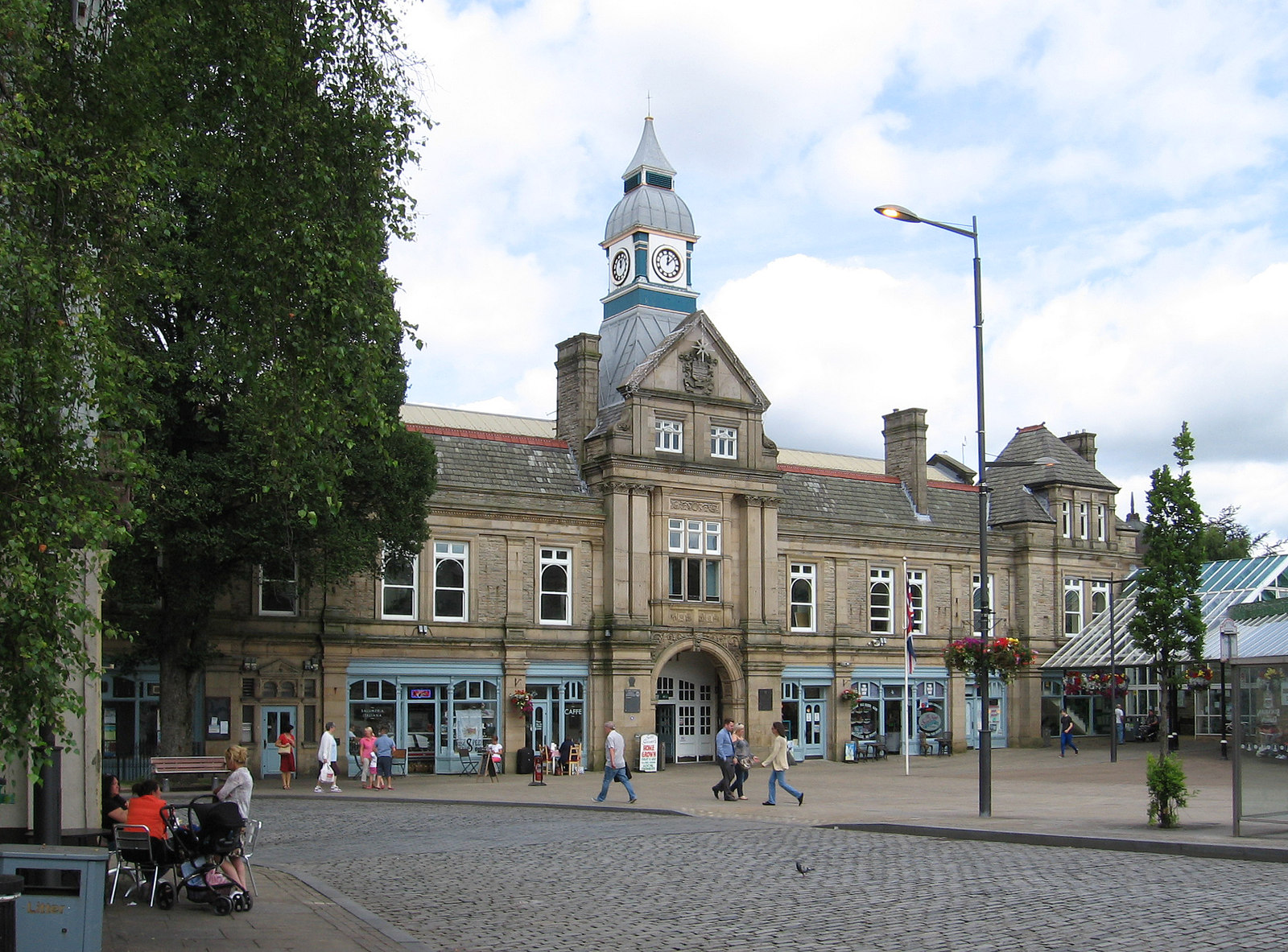
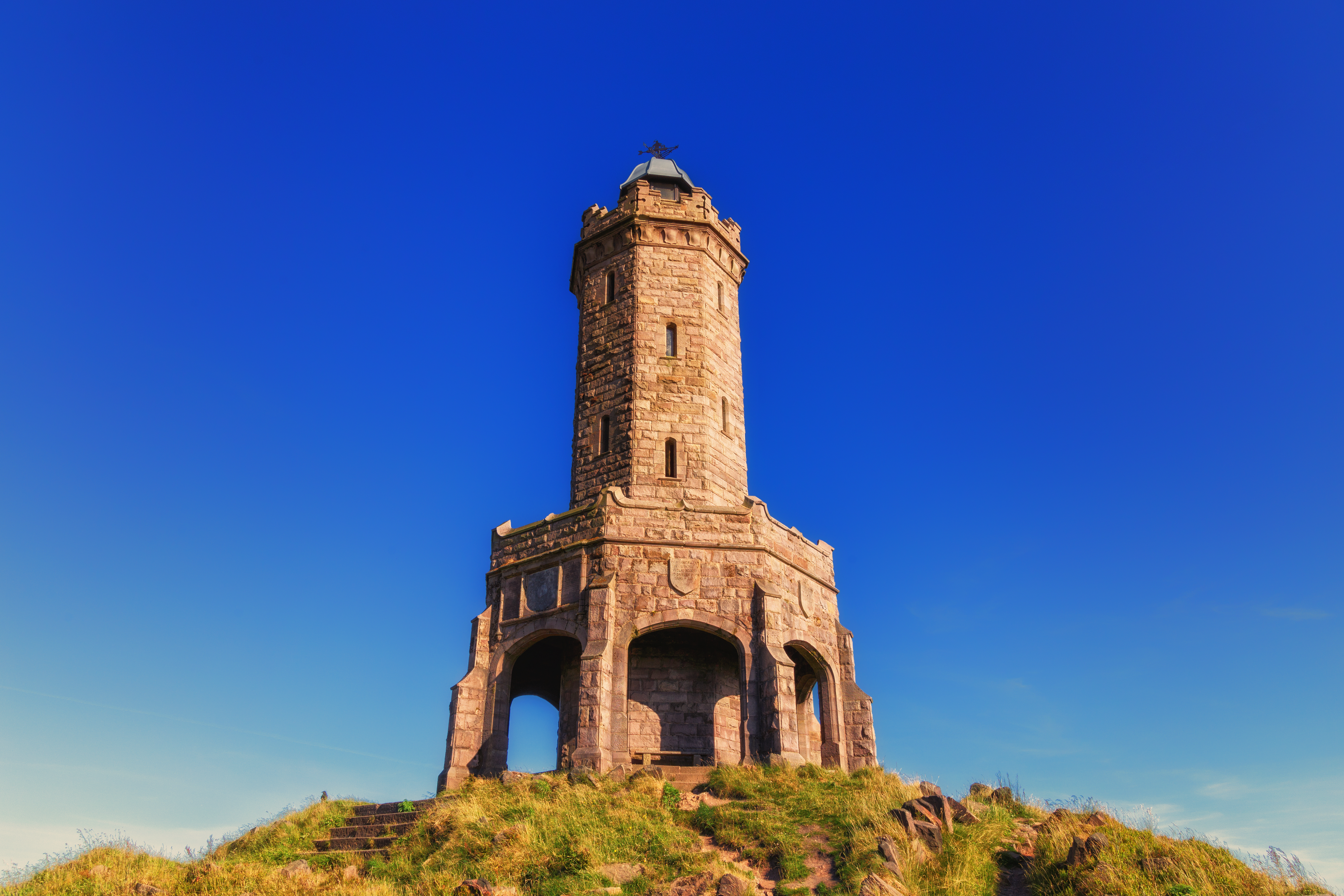
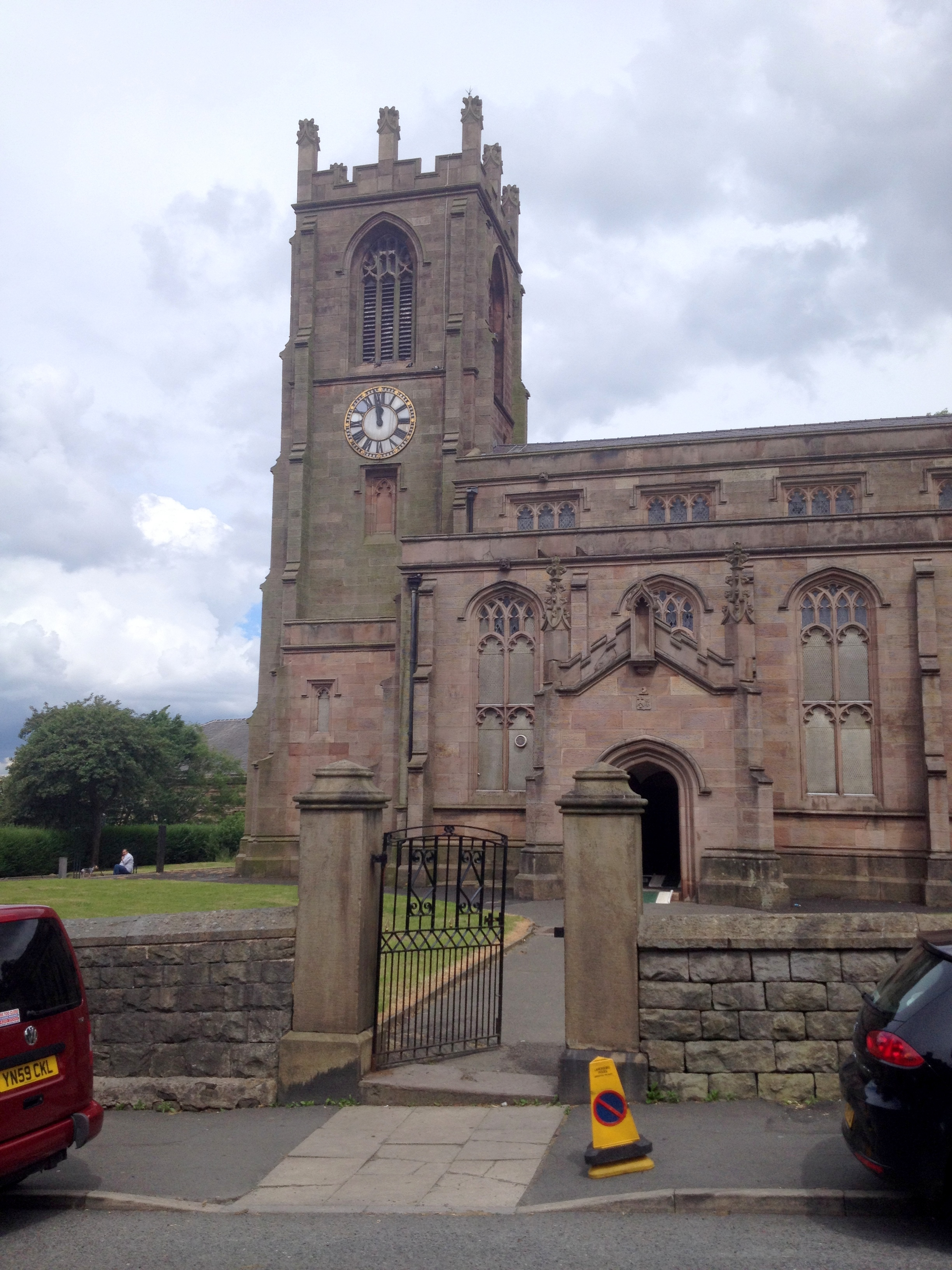
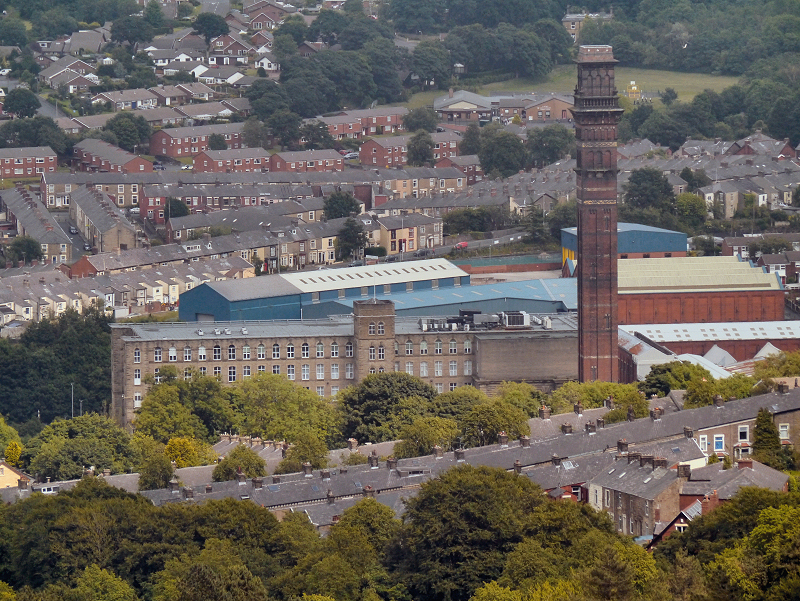
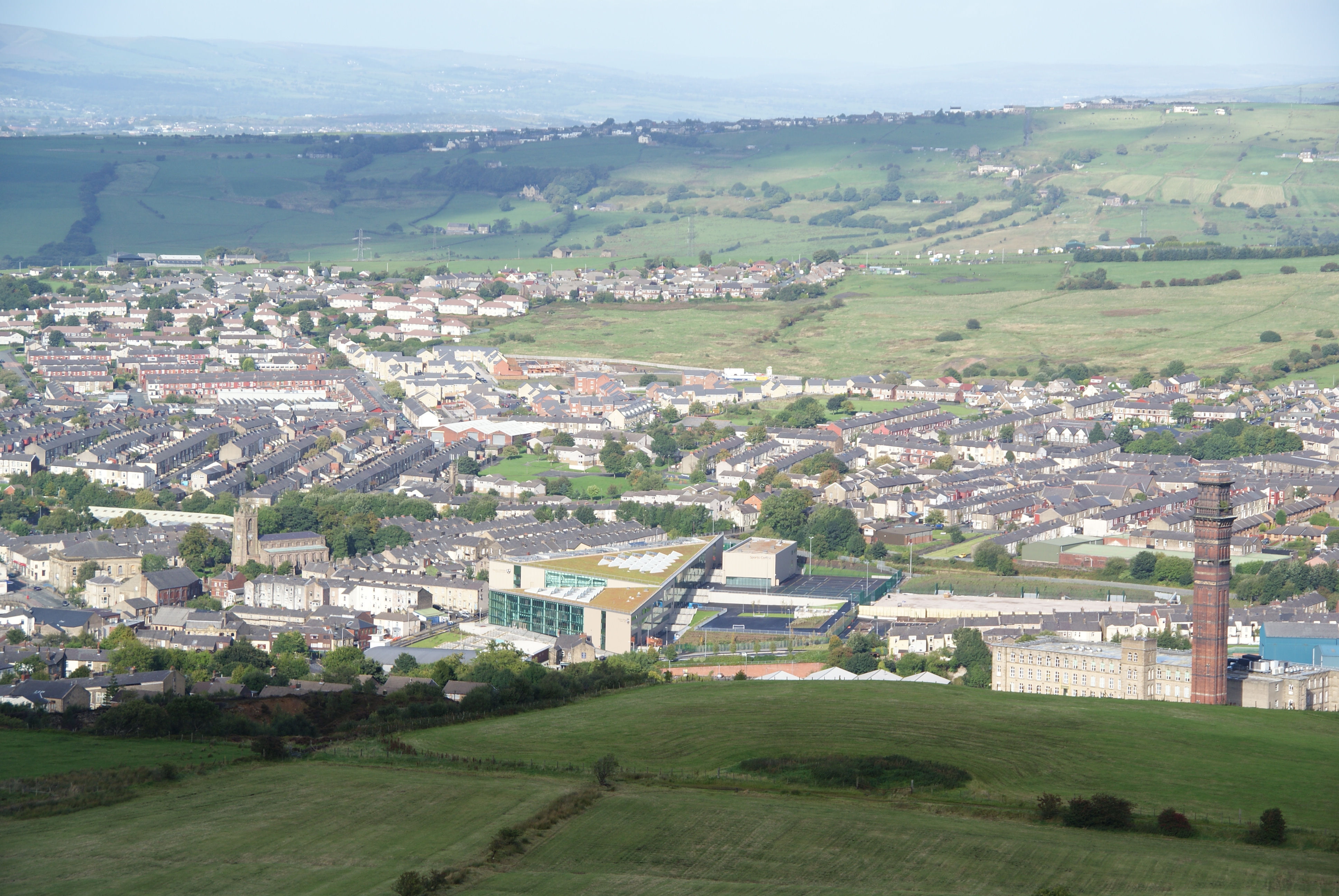
- From left to right: Top: Darwen Town Hall; Middle: Jubilee Tower and Parish church; Bottom: India Mill with surrounding properties and skyline from Darwen Moor

- Shown within Blackburn with Darwen Location within Lancashire
- Interactive map showing the parish boundary
- Area: 19.8 km^{2} (7.6 sq mi)
- Population: 28,124 (2021 census)
  - Density: 1,420/km^{2} (3,700/sq mi)
- Demonym: Darrener
- OS grid reference: SD695225
- Civil parish: Darwen
- Unitary authority: Blackburn with Darwen
- Ceremonial county: Lancashire
- Region: North West
- Country: England
- Sovereign state: United Kingdom
- Post town: Darwen
- Postcode district: BB3
- Dialling code: 01254
- Police: Lancashire
- Fire: Lancashire
- Ambulance: North West
- UK Parliament: Rossendale and Darwen

Darwen is a market town and civil parish in the Blackburn with Darwen borough of Lancashire, England. The residents of the town are known as "Darreners". The town lies on the River Darwen, which flows from south to north and is seen in parks in the town centre. The A666 road passes through Darwen towards Blackburn to the north, Bolton to the south and Pendlebury, where it joins the A6, about 18 miles (29 km) north-west of Manchester. The population of Darwen stood at 28,124 in the 2021 census. It comprises four wards and has its own town council.

== Toponymy ==
Darwen's name is Celtic in origin. In Sub Roman Britain, it was within the Brythonic kingdom of Rheged, a successor to the Brigantes tribal territory. The Brythonic language name for oak is derw and this is etymologically linked to Derewent (1208), an ancient spelling for the river Darwen. Despite the area becoming part of the Anglo-Saxon Kingdom of Northumbria by the mid-eighth century, its Brythonic name was never supplanted by an Old English place name.

== History ==
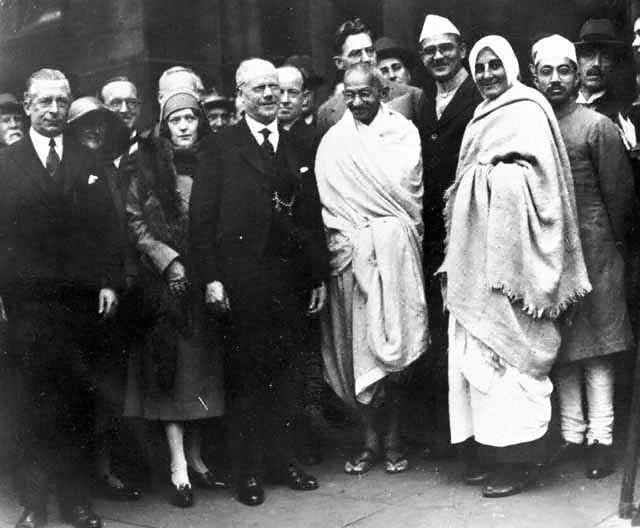
Mahatma Gandhi in Darwen, 26 September 1931 with Mirabehn (Madeleine Slade)

The area around Darwen has been inhabited since the early Bronze Age and the remains of a round barrow from approximately 2000 BCE have been partially restored at the Ashleigh Barrow in Whitehall. The barrow had ten interments, nine of which were Collared Urn burials; as well as human remains, items found at the barrow included a bronze dagger some 7.5 inches (19 cm) in length, a flint thumb scraper, a sub-plano-convex knife and a clay bead. Copies of the Collared Urns may be seen at the Darwen Library.

The Romans once had a force in Lancashire and a Roman road is visible on the Ordnance Survey map of the area; medieval Darwen was tiny and little or nothing survives. One of the earliest remaining buildings is a farmhouse at Bury Fold, dated 1675. Whitehall Cottage is thought to be the oldest house in the town and was built mostly in the 17th and 18th centuries, but contains a chimney piece dated 1557.

Like many towns in Lancashire, Darwen was a centre for textile manufacture during the Industrial Revolution. Samuel Crompton, inventor of the spinning mule, lived there for part of his life. The railway and the Leeds and Liverpool Canal arrived in the mid-19th century. The most important textile building in Darwen is India Mill, built by Eccles Shorrock & Company. The company was ruined, however, by the effects of the Lancashire Cotton Famine of the 1860s. Cotton manufacture was an important industry and the Darwen Weavers', Winders' and Warpers' Association had more than 8,000 members in the town by 1907.

In the early 1840s. Eccles Shorrock created a large mill lodge (industrial reservoir) in what is now the lower part of Bold Venture Park, by constructing a dam where Inverness Road now runs across the valley cut by Bold Venture Brook. In 1848, during a night of heavy thunder storms and torrential rain, water rushed down from the moors and the dam failed catastrophically. The water level dropped by 40 feet (12 m) almost instantly and a wall of water swept down into the town centre, causing considerable damage and drowning several people who slept in cellars under shops and houses in the Market Street area.

Much of the town was built between about 1850 and 1900. Many clues reflect this: placenames, date stones in terraces, the vernacular architecture of cellars, local stone, locally-made brick, pipework, tiles and leaded glass. It was one of the first places in the world to have steam trams.

Andrew Carnegie financed a Darwen Library; the town also had an art and technology college, and a grammar school. In 1931, Darwen was visited by Mahatma Gandhi, he had accepted the invitation from Corder Catchpool, Quaker manager of the Spring Vale Garden Village Ltd, to see the effects of India's boycott of cotton goods.

India Mill is now home to many companies, including Brookhouse (producers of aeroplane parts) and Capita Group, which runs TV licensing. Since the 1950s, the textile industry has strongly declined in the region, although many industrial buildings from the period survive, now used for other purposes. India Mill and its chimney were sold in a £12 million deal.

Among Darwen's other notable employers include:

- Crown Paints, formerly Walpamur Paints, the earliest British paint manufacturer, which named one of its paints Darwen Satin Finish
- Crown Wallpaper manufactured wallpaper, Lincrusta and Anaglypta in the town. In 2004, Crown Wallcoverings, previously one of the biggest businesses in the town, closed with the loss of more than 200 jobs.
- ICI Acrylics (now called Lucite International) was where acrylic glass (Perspex for windows and signage, and Sani-ware or Lucite used for the manufacture of baths and shower trays) was invented; it is still manufactured in two separate plants within the town
- Spitfire canopies and (later) coloured polythene washing-up bowls were first made here. A heritage centre opened in 2016

== Geography ==
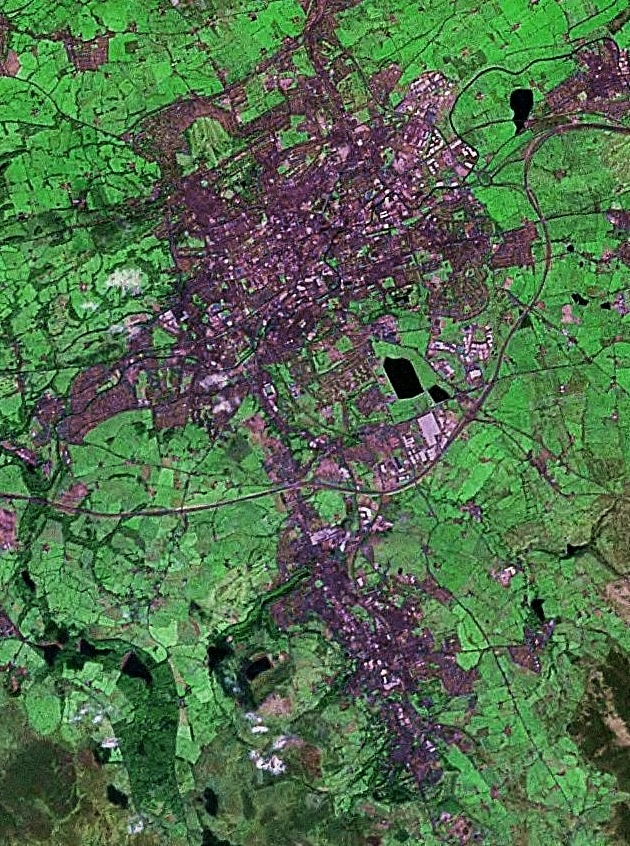
NASA Landsat 7 image of Blackburn (North) and Darwen (South)

Darwen is located amid the West Pennine Moors south of Blackburn; it stands within a valley with the river Darwen flowing at its base. The river passes through the town from south to north, subsequently joining the River Ribble, which flows into the Irish Sea between Lytham St Annes and Southport. The A666 road follows the valley through the town centre as part of its route from the Ribble Valley, north of Blackburn, to Bolton and the boundary between Pendlebury and Irlams o' th' Height in Salford. The town's weather conditions made it perfect for cotton weaving and, as a result, it became one of the largest mill towns in Lancashire.

The Guinness Book of Records records that Darwen had one of the largest flash floods in the United Kingdom, in 1848; 12 people died.

== Governance ==
The municipal borough of Darwen was created in 1878; it was merged with Blackburn in 1974 under the Local Government Act 1972. The town became part of the Lancashire non-metropolitan district of Blackburn, which was renamed Blackburn with Darwen in 1997, shortly before it became a unitary authority.

Locally, Darwen has been represented by Labour, Conservative and Liberal Democrat councillors in the main council wards for the town. In the 2008 local elections, the For Darwen Party picked up the majority of the wards in the town to put pressure on Blackburn with Darwen Borough Council for Darwen to have its own council again. In April 2009, Darwen Town Council was formed.

There are five council wards within Darwen, out of the 23 in the Borough of Blackburn with Darwen; these are:

- Earcroft
- Marsh House
- Sudell
- Sunnyhurst
- Whitehall.

The Darwen parliamentary constituency existed until 1983, when it became part of the present Rossendale and Darwen constituency. This seat is currently held by Andy MacNae.

=== Coat of arms ===
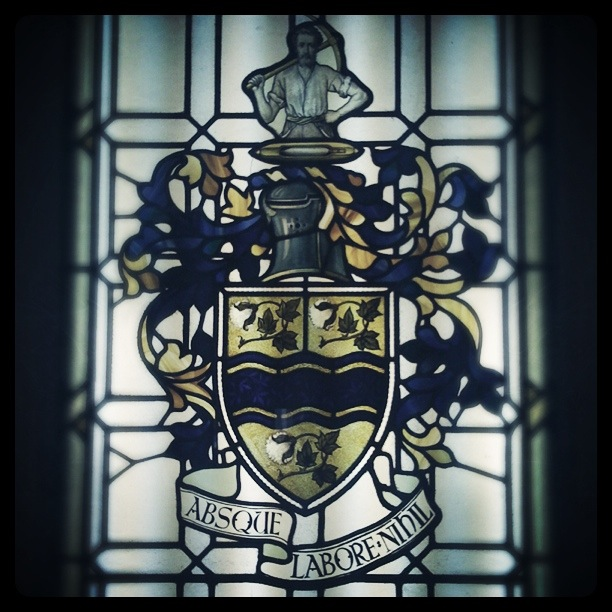
Darwen coat of arms depicted in stained glass at Royal Blackburn Hospital

Darwen has its own coat of arms, which was granted on 7 August 1878; this is different from that of the unitary authority of Blackburn with Darwen, which uses the coat of arms for Blackburn. At the foot of the coat of arms is the town motto in Latin, Absque Labore Nihil, which translates as "Nothing without labour". The arms depicts three cotton bolls and the River Darwen which runs through the town. The cotton represents the cotton industry in which the town grew and prospered during the Industrial Revolution and the three bolls to represent the three main areas of Darwen: Over Darwen, Lower Darwen and Hoddlesden. At the helm of the coat of arms is a barred helmet representing nobility and, above it, is the torse in the town colours of blue and gold. At the crest, a man stands shouldering a pickaxe, which refers to the town's motto and also represents the mining industry that was present to the east of the town at that time.

== Demographics ==
At the 2021 census, Darwen civil parish had a population of 28,124 people in 12,676 households.

The population of the town declined from 40,000 in the 1911 census to 30,000 in the 1971 census.

Census population of Darwen parish
Census	Population	Female	Male	Households	Source
2011	28,046	14,217	13,829	12,306	
2021	28,124	14,242	13,882	12,676	

== Culture and community ==
The Darwen News published a Maudley Medley on 9 March 1878:

'Tween two hillsides, both bleak and barren,
Lies lovely little "Dirty Darren"

The locals refer to themselves as Darreners; they are generally resistant to any attempts at submerging the identity of the town within Blackburn. A motorway service area at junction 4 of the M65 motorway lies within the town, and was originally named "Blackburn Services". Following local protests it was renamed "Blackburn with Darwen Services".

Darwen is twinned with Lamin, Gambia.

=== Music ===
The Darwen School of Music (formerly Elite School of Music) is situated on Blackburn Road; it has a majority focus on popular music and is the parent school of the popular Begin2Sing workshop project.

Darwen Live (formerly Darwen Music Live) is a free two-day music festival held each year over the second bank holiday in May. The main stage is built outside the town hall, with other smaller stages are usually based around the town in pubs and bars. The festival has attracted artists such as Buzzcocks, China Crisis, Toyah, The Hoosiers, The Undertones and Paul Young, as well as being a showcase for local bands. It currently holds the title of the biggest free music festival in the UK by attendance, with its crowd of roughly 35-40,000 in 2024 even leading to the claim that it could be the largest in Europe.

Record label Sunbird Records (Note: No connection to the American label of the same name.) and an associated venue/recording studio are based in Darwen, established by locals Steven Lindley and Ian Almond. Following the label's closure in 2013, the venue was opened in the town centre in 2016 by Steven's son Jonathan to "provide a performance space, recording studio and record label all under one roof." The venue is notable for being saved from closure in 2023, during a campaign which was supported by Ed Sheeran and Music Venue Trust.

Two labels associated with the donk genre of music, Bad Records and Bncy Music, are based in Darwen. The group Bad Behaviour (DJ Greenie and Bon Lee), founders of Bad, are also known for appearing on major labels such as Ministry of Sound. Bncy Music is associated with the local YouTube channel and podcast series Flexxed TV.

Darwen has one of the oldest brass bands in the country. Now named Blackburn and Darwen Band, its roots can be traced back to 1840. Another brass band, Darwen Brass, was formed in 2007 and has enjoyed many notable competition successes, including fourth section wins throughout the North West. In 2012, Darwen Brass qualified for the National Brass Band Championships, finishing fifth.

=== In popular culture ===
The TV series Hetty Wainthropp Investigates was filmed in the town.

Darwen has a few footnotes in entertainment history; its theatre (now demolished) had appearances by Charlie Chaplin and it featured in the film, There Was a Crooked Man, which starred Norman Wisdom and Alfred Marks.

The Beatles played in Darwen on 25 January 1963, at the Co-operative Hall. They headlined "The Greatest Teenage Dance" which was commissioned by the Darwen Baptist Youth Club. Support acts included the Electones, the Mike Taylor Combo and the Mustangs with Ricky Day.

== Landmarks ==
=== Darwen Jubilee Tower ===
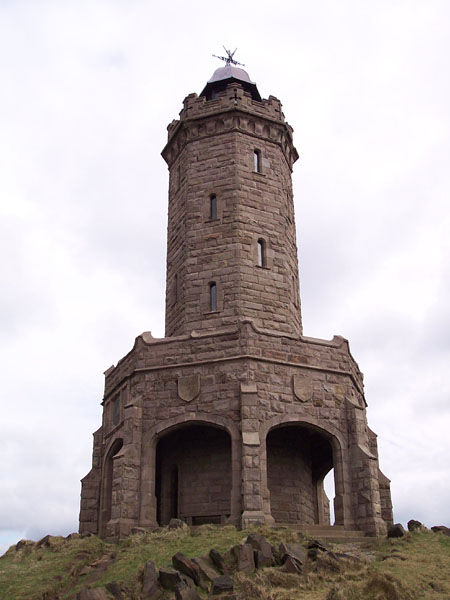
Darwen Jubilee Tower

In 1897, the town council met to deliberate how best to celebrate Queen Victoria's Diamond Jubilee. The idea of building the Jubilee Tower was put forward, in conjunction with public access to the moors. A competition to design the tower was won by Ralph Ellison from the borough engineer's department and work began on 22 June 1897. On 24 September 1898. the opening ceremony was attended by over 3,000 people. Present at the ceremony were Councillor Alexander Carus, Mayor Charles Huntington, the High Sheriff of Lancashire and Lord of the manor Rev. W.A. Duckworth.

The tower, which is open to the public, overlooks the town from the moors; it stands at an altitude of 1,227 feet (374 m) and has a height of 85 feet (26 m). A spiral staircase leads to the top from where, on a clear day, Blackpool Tower, the Isle of Man, North Wales and the Furness Peninsula can be seen. In November 2010, the dome of the tower was blown off by strong winds; it was restored in January 2012.

=== Darwen Library ===
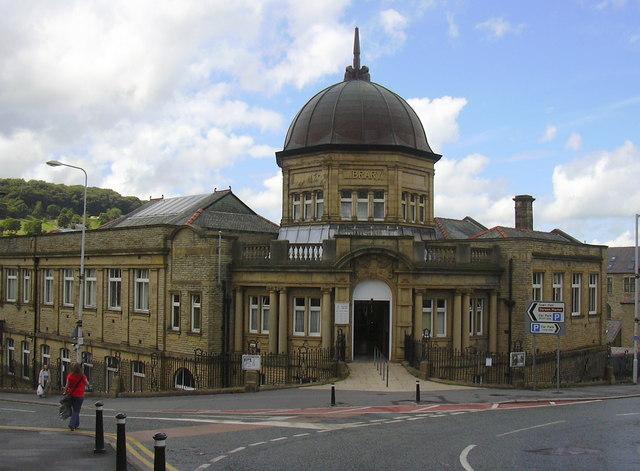
Darwen Library, as seen from Railway Road

Originally situated in the Peel Street, Darwen Library was transferred to the new technical school building in 1895.

Today, Darwen Library stands at the corner of Knott Street and School Street, to the north of the Circus. It was commissioned by Andrew Carnegie, a Scottish migrant to the USA, who made his fortune as a producer of iron and steel. He donated £8,000 in response to a speculative appeal for funds by the Library Committee. The opening took place on 27 May 1908 and was attended by mayor G.P. Holde, councillor Ralph Yates and Carnegie himself. The library has served the town ever since, with the original lecture hall being transformed into the Library Theatre in June 1971. On 27 April 2017, the library and theatre were designated as a grade II listed building.

=== Darwen Town Hall ===
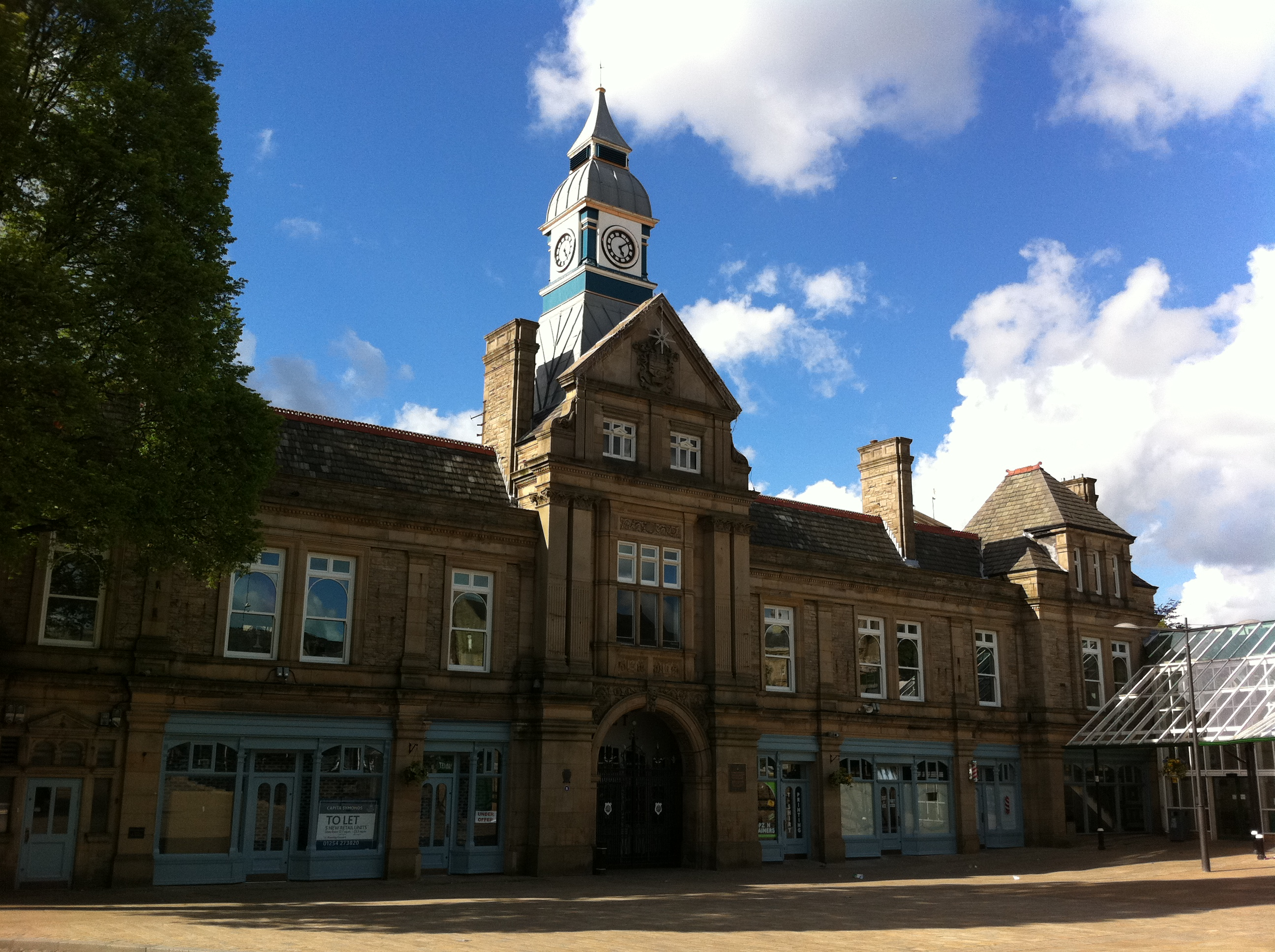
Darwen Town Hall

Darwen Town Hall was opened on 11 July 1882 and the clock tower was added in 1899, when Dr. James Ballantyne became mayor. In the 1920s, part of the market ground was made into the town's bus station which remains today. Although local government proceedings were transferred to Blackburn in the 1970s, the council chambers remained in the building; they were used by the magistrates' court from 1983 until 1992. The town hall currently houses offices of Blackburn with Darwen borough council and the local Neighbourhood Policing Team, and is a venue for meetings of the Darwen Town Council. Five shop units opened in 2011.

=== Parks ===
Darwen has four parks: three are on the west of the main road through the town, with paths leading to countryside and to Jubilee Tower; the fourth and newest is Ashton Park, which is on the east side of Bolton Road, just behind the Spinners Arms pub.

==== Bold Venture Park ====
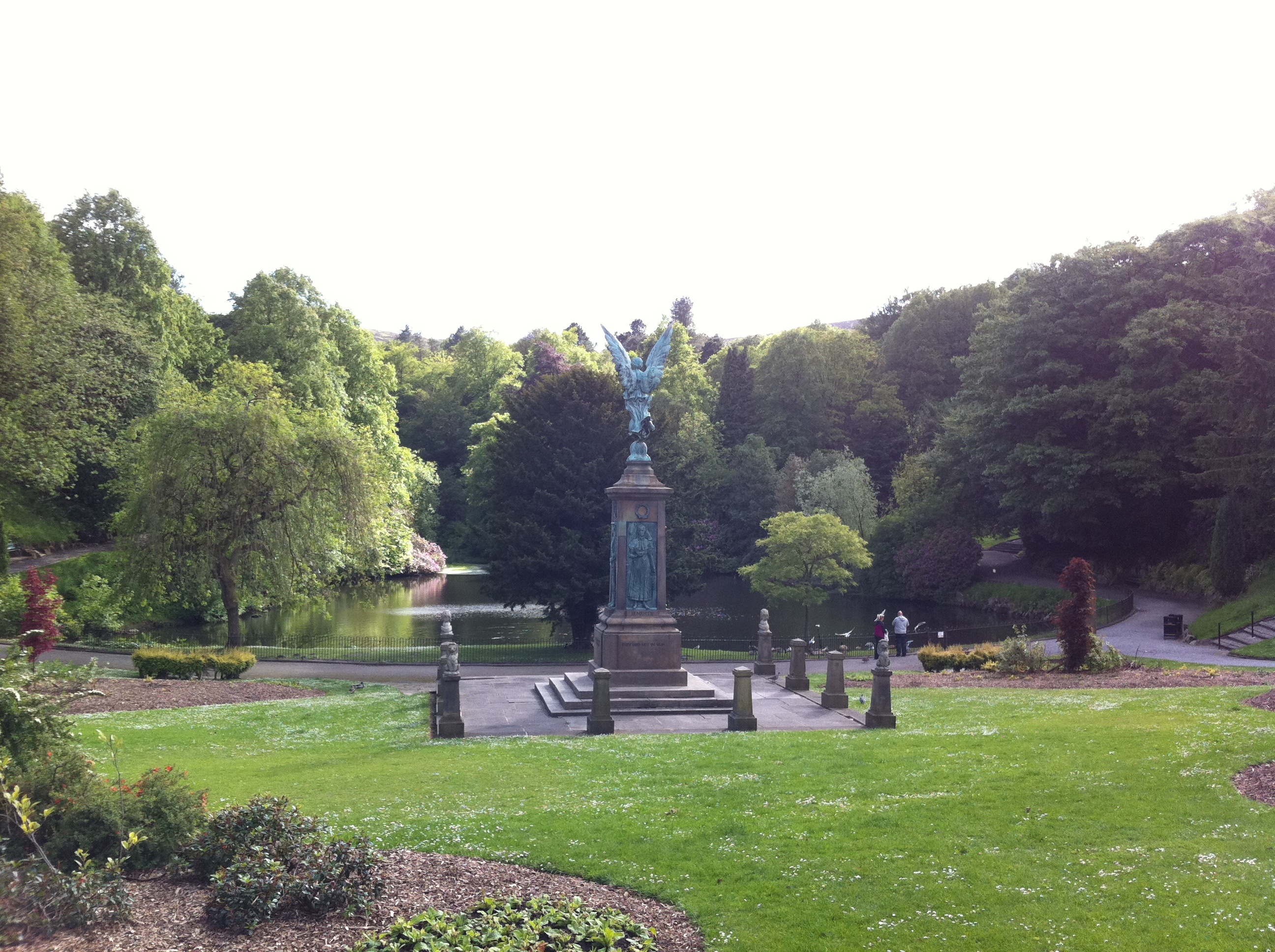
Bold Venture Park from the main entrance. The picture also shows the Darwen War Memorial

Bold Venture Park stands to the west of the town, at the foot of the moors and the path which leads to the Jubilee Tower. The land in which the park lies was bought by Darwen Corporation from Rev. W.A. Duckworth. It was designed by R. W. Smith-Saville, the borough engineer, and opened in 1889.

==== Sunnyhurst Wood ====
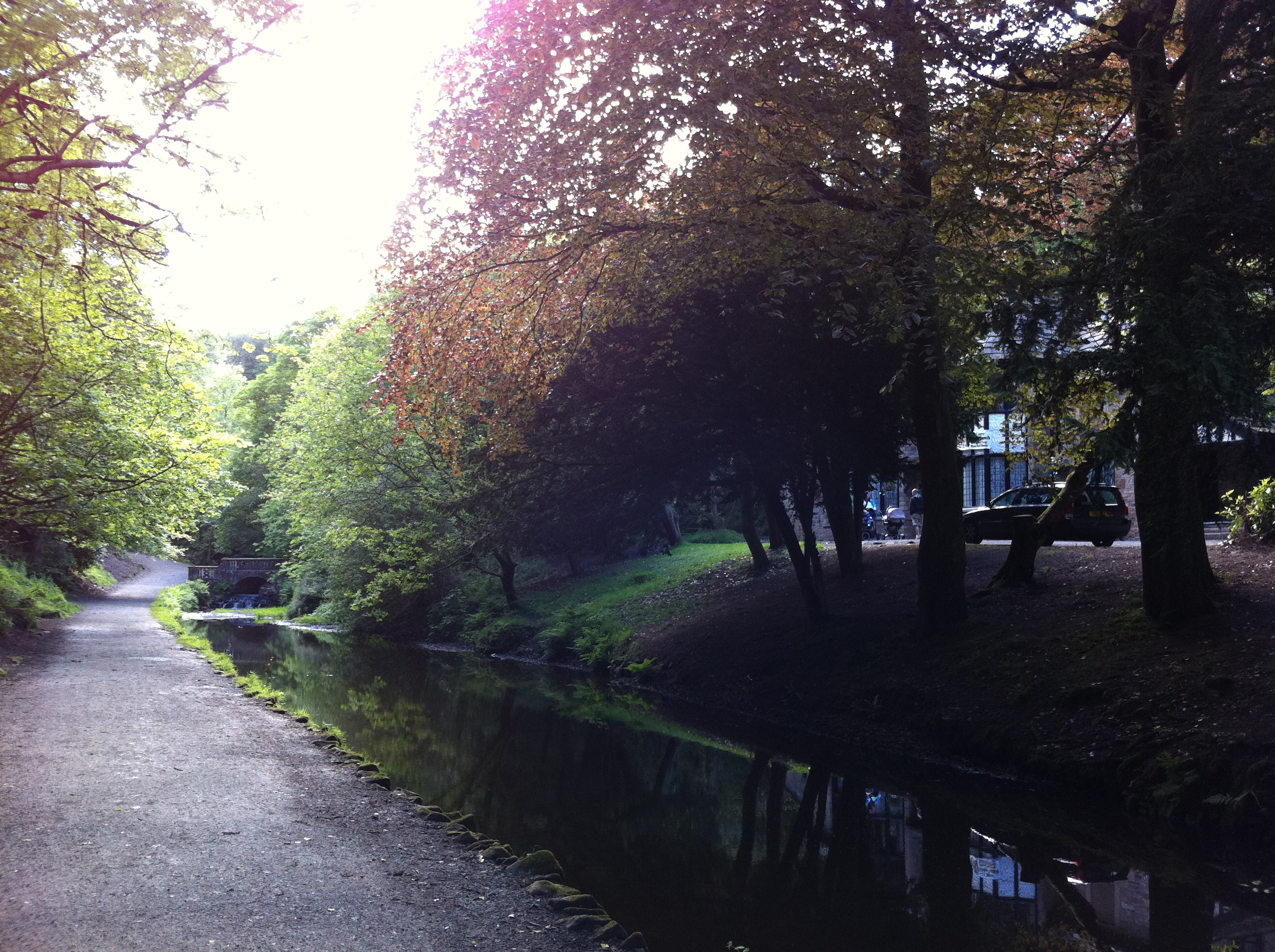
Sunnyhurst Wood

The wood was originally owned by the Brock-Hollinshead family and used for hunting stag; the area was later sold to Eccles Shorrock. To commemorate the coronation of Edward VII, the land was turned into a public park on 2 July 1903.

==== Whitehall Park ====
Whitehall Park is a 16-acre (6.5 ha) park in the south of the town. It was opened in 1879, on land acquired from John Adamson.

=== Crown Wallcovering building ===
The Crown building was a large red brick ten-storey building, with numerous chimneys. In 2006, the empty building and the 200 feet (61 m) chimney was demolished.

== Transport ==
Darwen lies in a large valley, strung along the A666 road along the valley floor. It is connected to the motorway system at junction 4 of the M65 at Earcroft, on the town's northern boundary. Considerable traffic passes through the town centre along the A666, causing high levels of air pollution. The local council has recently attempted to address the situation by adding a new road layout to the town centre, with public transport and junction improvements to reduce traffic.

Darwen railway station is a stop on the Ribble Valley line; Northern Trains operates a regular service between Clitheroe, Blackburn, Bolton, Manchester Victoria and Rochdale.

Local bus services centre around the town's bus terminal, Darwen Circus. Routes are operated by Blackburn Bus Company, Stagecoach Cumbria and North Lancashire, Vision Bus, Travel Assist and Moving People; these connect the town with Blackburn, Accrington, Bolton, Bury and Clitheroe.

== Education ==
After the passing of the Education Act 1870, many schools were established to serve the ever-growing population (many were later demolished):

- Darwen Aldridge Community Academy opened in September 2008 at the premises of the former Darwen Moorland High School on the outskirts of the town, which had closed in July 2008 to reopen as the academy after the summer holidays. All pupils from Darwen Moorland transferred to the academy. Pupils have subsequently moved down to the new site, into a state-of-the-art £49 million academy, with sixth form and modern facilities.
- Darwen Vale High School was temporarily moved to the old Moorland site, whilst a new build was completed on the original site. The original school façade was incorporated into the new build and Darwen Vale was transferred back to the original site in 2012. However, the move had caused major issues with the management at the school, which led to the head leaving and a new head taking over in 2013. Later in 2013, Ofsted ruled that the school was failing and the government ordered the school's conversion to academy status, sponsored by the Aldridge Foundation, despite teaching staff and parents protesting governmental imposition on the school's management.
- In September 2013, Darwen Aldridge Enterprise Studio opened and the school moved to its permanent home in 2014 in the renovated former Model Lodging House on Police Street.
- In January 2022, Crosshill School completed a £2 million move from Blackburn Central High School to the vacant Sunnyhurst Centre on Salisbury Road, with the move adding extra places at the school. It is part of the Champion Education Trust.

== Religion ==
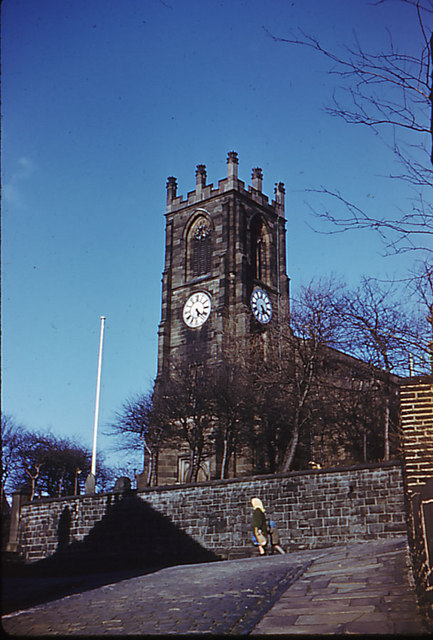
St Peter's church, the main parish church of Darwen

The Parish Church of Darwen is St Peter's, a large and active Anglican church consecrated in 1829. Further Anglican Churches in Darwen include St Cuthbert's (consecrated in 1878) serving the north of the town and St Barnabas (built 1884) serving the south.

Darwen Methodist Church meets on two sites in the town, at Bright Street and Spring Vale.

The Medina Mosque and Islamic Centre, Darwen's first mosque, is located on Victoria Street. Faizaan e Jamal e Mustafa is located on Railway Road and was opened in 2018.

== Media ==
Local news and television programmes are provided by BBC North West and ITV Granada. Television signals are received from Winter Hill transmitting station and the local relay transmitters.

Local radio stations are BBC Radio Lancashire, Heart North West, Smooth North West, Capital Manchester and Lancashire, Greatest Hits Radio Lancashire, and Central Radio North West, a community-based station.

The Lancashire Telegraph is the local newspaper that covers the town.

== Sport ==
The town was the home of Darwen FC, formed in 1870 and the world's first football club to have paid professional players. The team reached the semi-final of the FA Cup in 1880-81 and played in the Football League at the Barley Bank ground between 1891 and 1899. The club was wound up at the end of the 2008–09 season and replaced almost immediately by A.F.C. Darwen. The new club plays in the First Division North of the North West Counties Football League and is based at the Anchor Ground.

The town has a strong cricketing tradition and Darwen Cricket Club was originally founded in the late 1800s as Darwen Etrurians CC playing at Barley Bank. The current club was constituted in 1911 and since 1920 has been based at Birch Hall Cricket Ground. The club was a founder member of the Northern League in 1951, winning that competition five times before successfully applying to play in the Lancashire League from the 2017 season. This change heralded a golden era for the club and, within five seasons, it had won every club competition in the county. Twice holders of the Worsley Cup (2017 and 2019), T20 champions in 2021 and LCF Knockout Cup winners in 2018 with the set completed when crowned 2022 Lancashire League champions after defeating Greenmount by 13 runs on 4 September 2022. Past professionals include David Wiese, George Linde (SA) Keith Semple (WI) and Scott Hookey (AUS). Sangeeth Cooray will be the clubs first Sri Lankan professional in 2026.

To the north-west of the town lies Darwen Golf Club. The characteristics of the course have changed little since it was established in 1893. Due to its geographical location within the moors, the course is regarded as a tough test of golfing ability.

Until the sports centre was demolished, Darwen was home to the North West Open Karate tournament, which hosted many national and world champions. Tower Shukokai Karate Club was resident at the sports centre from 1988 and remains active. Tower's instructors, Andy Allwood, 5th Dan and Martyn Skipper 4th Dan, both won this tournament in their respective weight categories (Allwood, heavyweight, in the 1990s and Skipper, lightweight, in 2006 after the tournament had moved to Bury). In 2013, Martyn Skipper won the WUKF European Veterans' title when the European Championships were held in Sheffield.

== Notable people ==
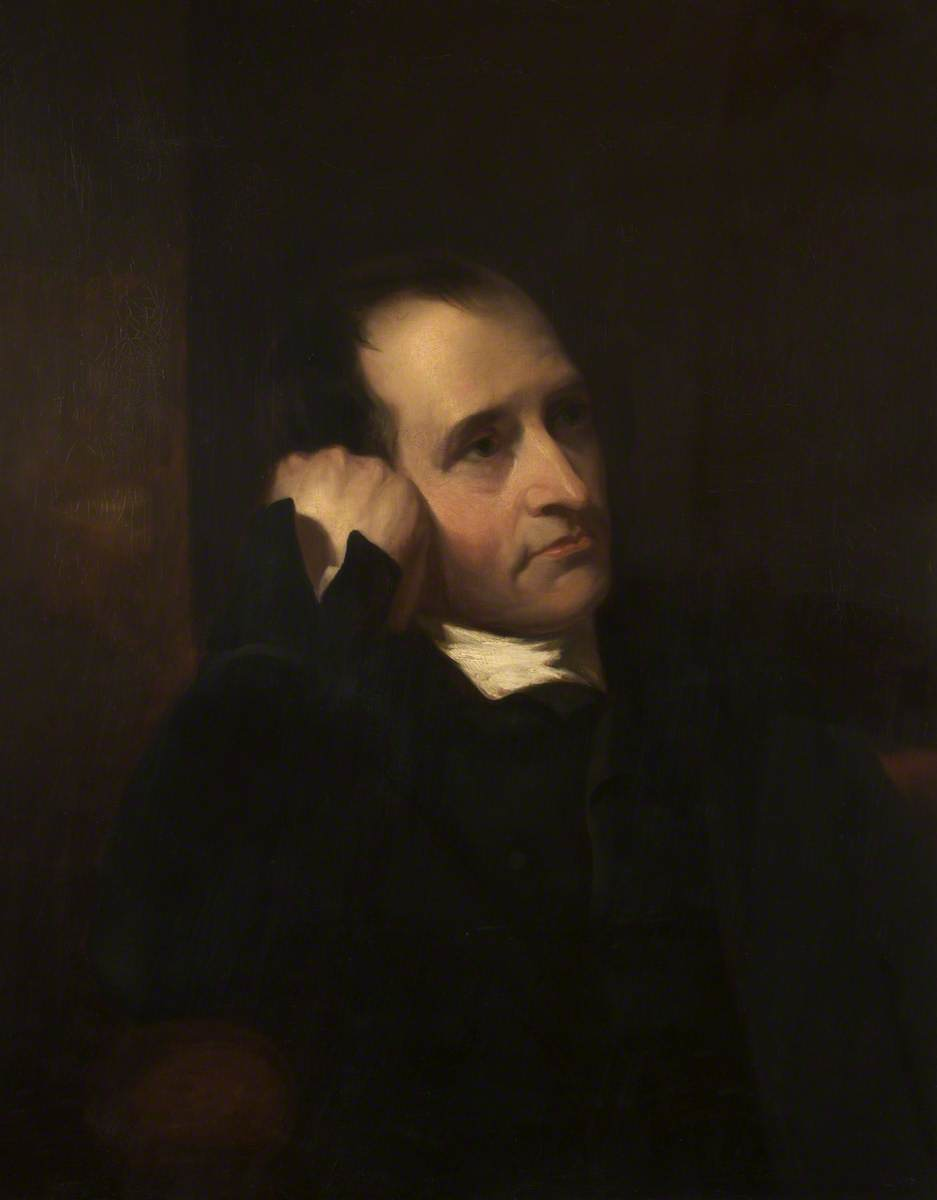
Samuel Crompton, ca.1800

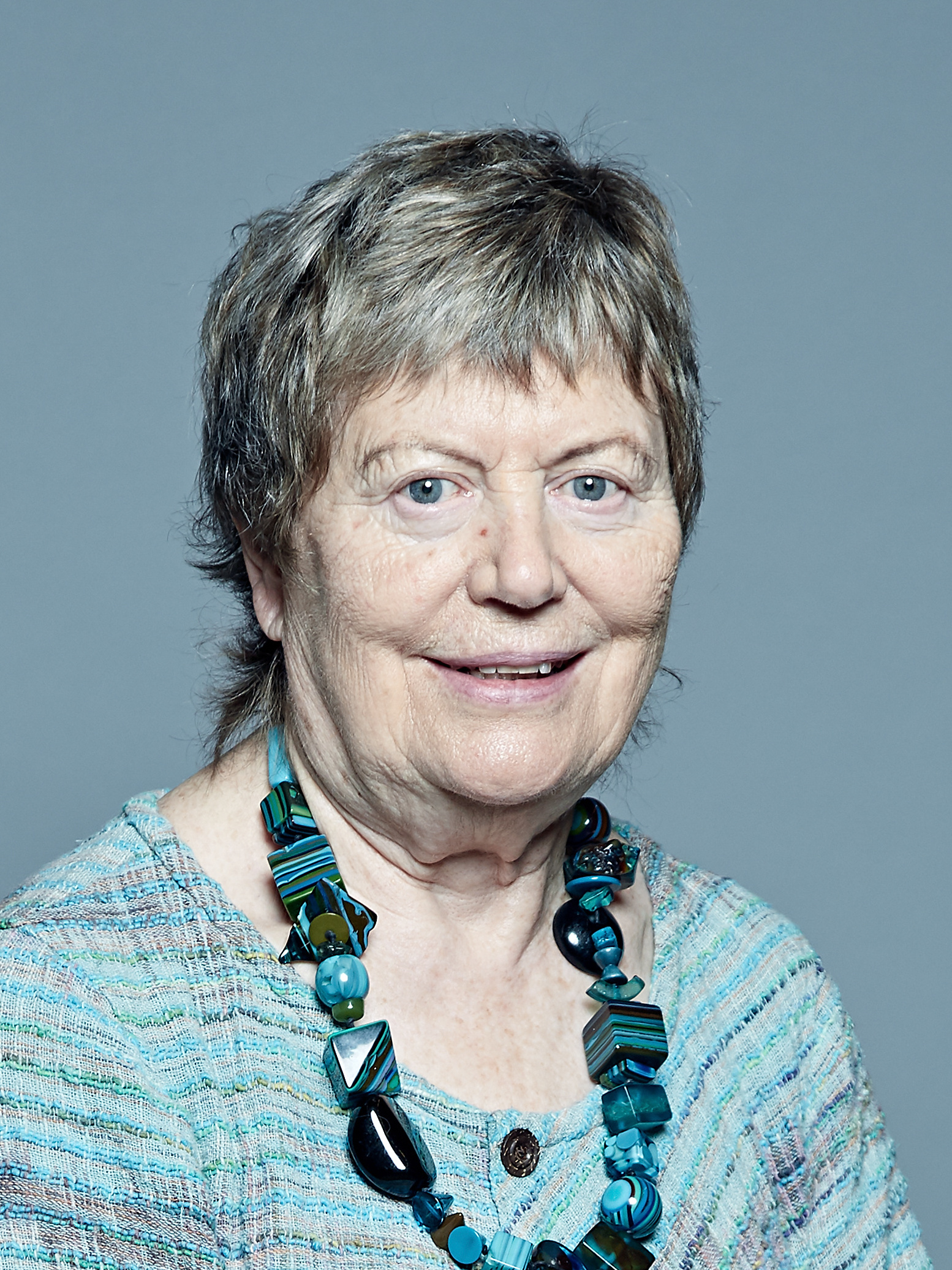
Doreen Massey, Baroness Massey of Darwen, 2017

- Edward Harwood (1707–1787), composer of hymns, anthems and songs.
- Edward Harwood (1729–1794), a prolific English classical scholar and biblical critic.
- Samuel Crompton (1753–1827), inventor of the Spinning Mule built and lived at Low Hill House, in Darwen.
- Lawrence John de Whalley (1853–1937), chemist, improved sugar refining and making Golden Syrup.
- Herbert Samuel, 1st Viscount Samuel (1870-1963), MP for Darwen, when he was leader of the Liberal Party and Home Secretary in the National Government (1931–1935).
- Stanley Webb Davies (1894–1978), a premier maker of Arts and Crafts furniture
- Charles Fletcher-Cooke (1914–2001), MP for Darwen from 1951–1983, promoted the Suicide Act 1961.
- Sigrid Augusta Green (1920–2012) gathered intelligence during WWII and a code breaker at Bletchley Park
- James Watson (born 1936), award-winning author including Children's literature
- Doreen Massey, Baroness Massey of Darwen (1938-2024), peer in the House of Lords, educator, public servant
- Margaret Chapman (1940–2000), illustrator and painter including oil and gouache paintings
- Alan Kendall (born 1944), Lead guitarist with the Bee Gees between 1971-1980 and 1987-2001
- Bryn Haworth (born 1948), British singer-songwriter and acclaimed slide guitarist and mandolin player
- Glyn Webster (born 1951), retired Anglican bishop, was Bishop of Beverley, 2013/2022 and acting Dean of York.
- Judy Hunt (born 1957), priest, who served as Archdeacon of Suffolk from 2009 to 2012.
- Neil Arthur (born 1958), lead vocalist of 1980s group Blancmange.
- John Cryer, Baron Cryer (born 1964), politician, previously the MP for Hornchurch from 1997 to 2005 and Leyton and Wanstead from 2015 to 2024
- Gary Aspden (born 1969) consultant and designer, chief curator of Adidas Spezial line, which he created in 2013.
- Ed Chapman (born 1971), a mosaic artist, born and went to school locally.
- Paul Stuart Davies (born 1982), hit songwriter and award winning vocal coach
- Kimmie Taylor (born 1989), English fighter with the YPJ - the Kurdish Women's Protection Units
- Travis D. Frain (born 1998), counter-extremism campaigner following the 2017 Westminster attack.
- Max Balegde, English social media personality

=== Sport ===
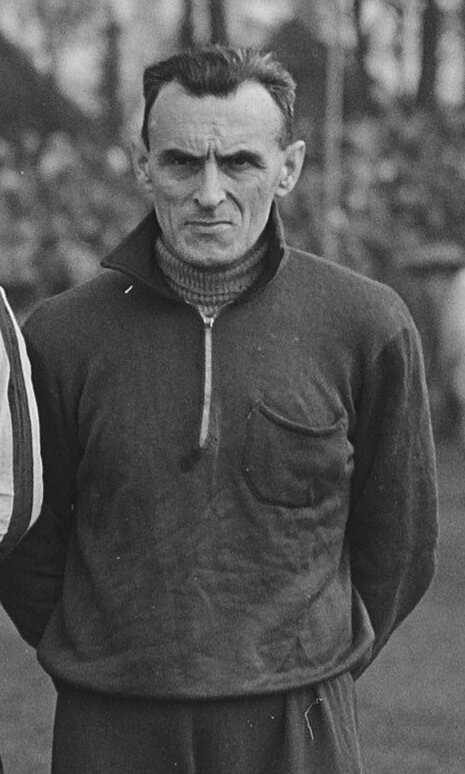
Sam Wadsworth, 1951

- Fergus Suter (1857–1916), footballer, joined Darwen F.C. (1870) in 1878; the world's first professional footballer
- John Leach (1866–1931), footballer who played 176 games for Darwen.
- George Parsonage (1880–1919), footballer, played 176 games for Brentford
- Sam Wadsworth (1896–1961), played 281 games for Huddersfield Town and 9 for England, of which he was captain
- Dick Burton (1907–1974), golf's Open champion, 1939
- Brian Booth (1935–2020), Lancashire and Leicestershire county cricketer, played 350 first-class cricket matches
- Alan Bolton (1939–2003), Lancashire county cricketer; played 40 first-class cricket matches
- Mark Patterson (born 1965), footballer, played about 500 games including 101 for Blackburn Rovers and 169 for Bolton Wanderers.
- Luke Jones (born 1987), footballer, played about 300 league matches
- Alex Davies (born 1994), cricketer, played 141 first-class cricket matches.

== Gallery ==
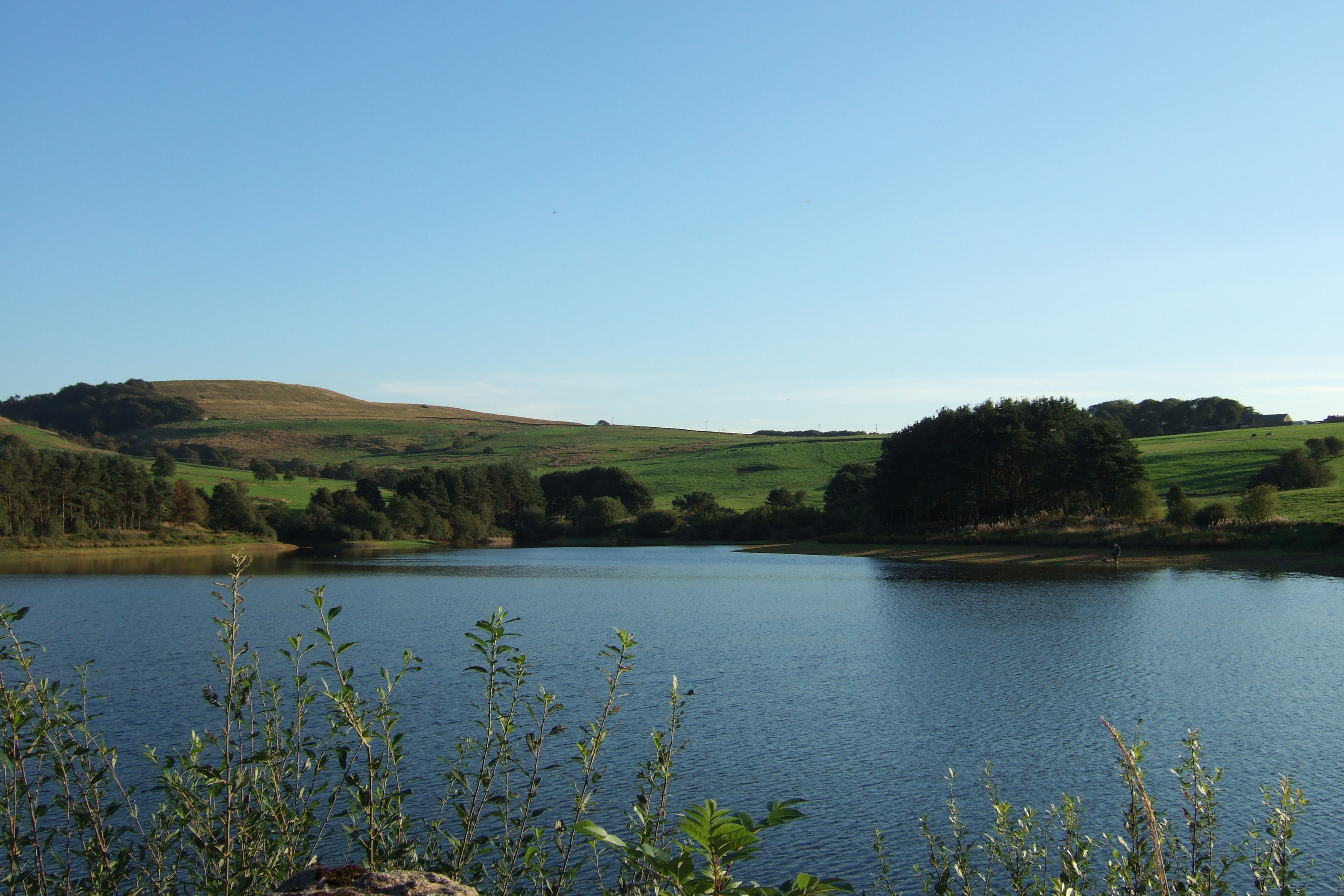
Darwen countryside

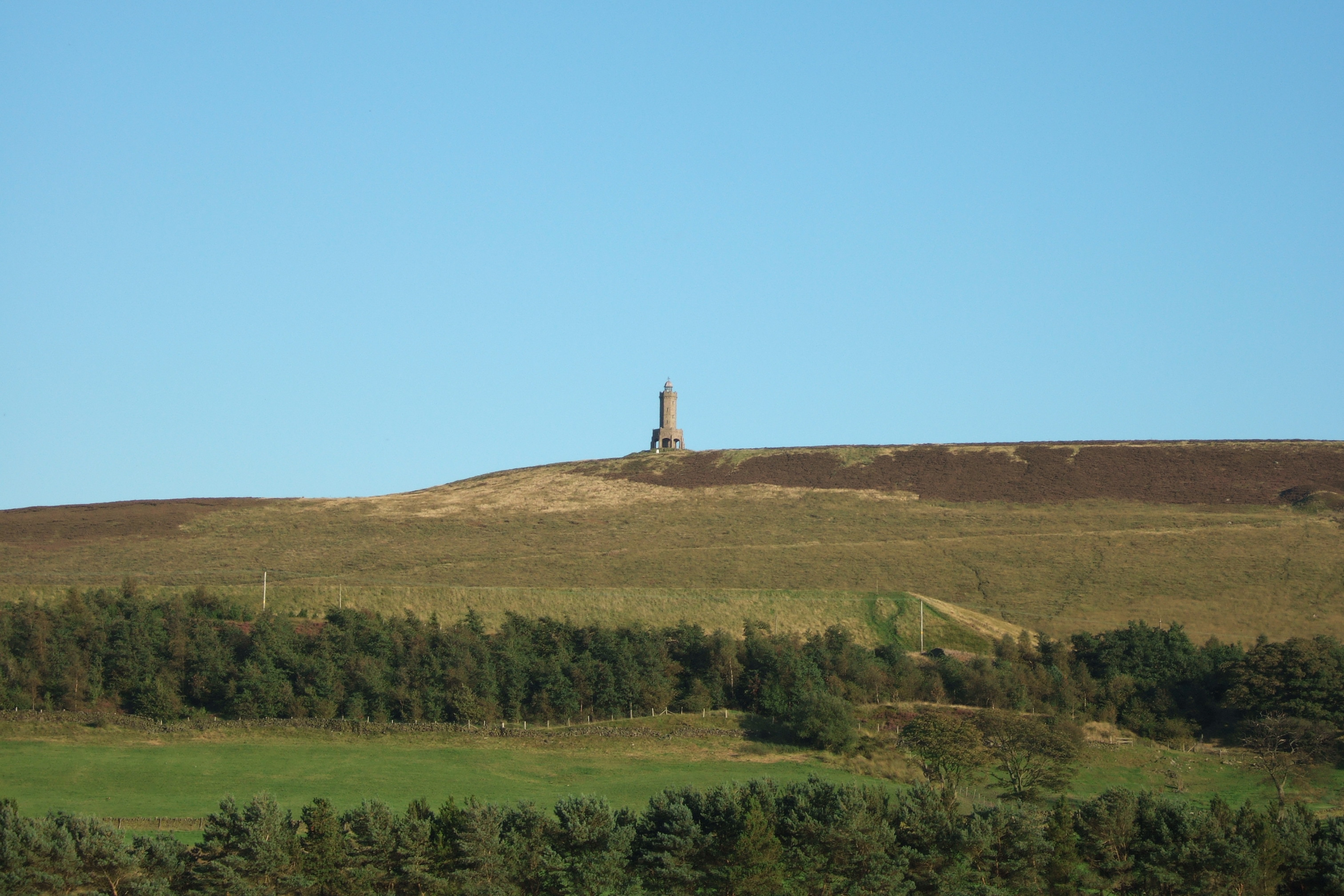
Darwen countryside

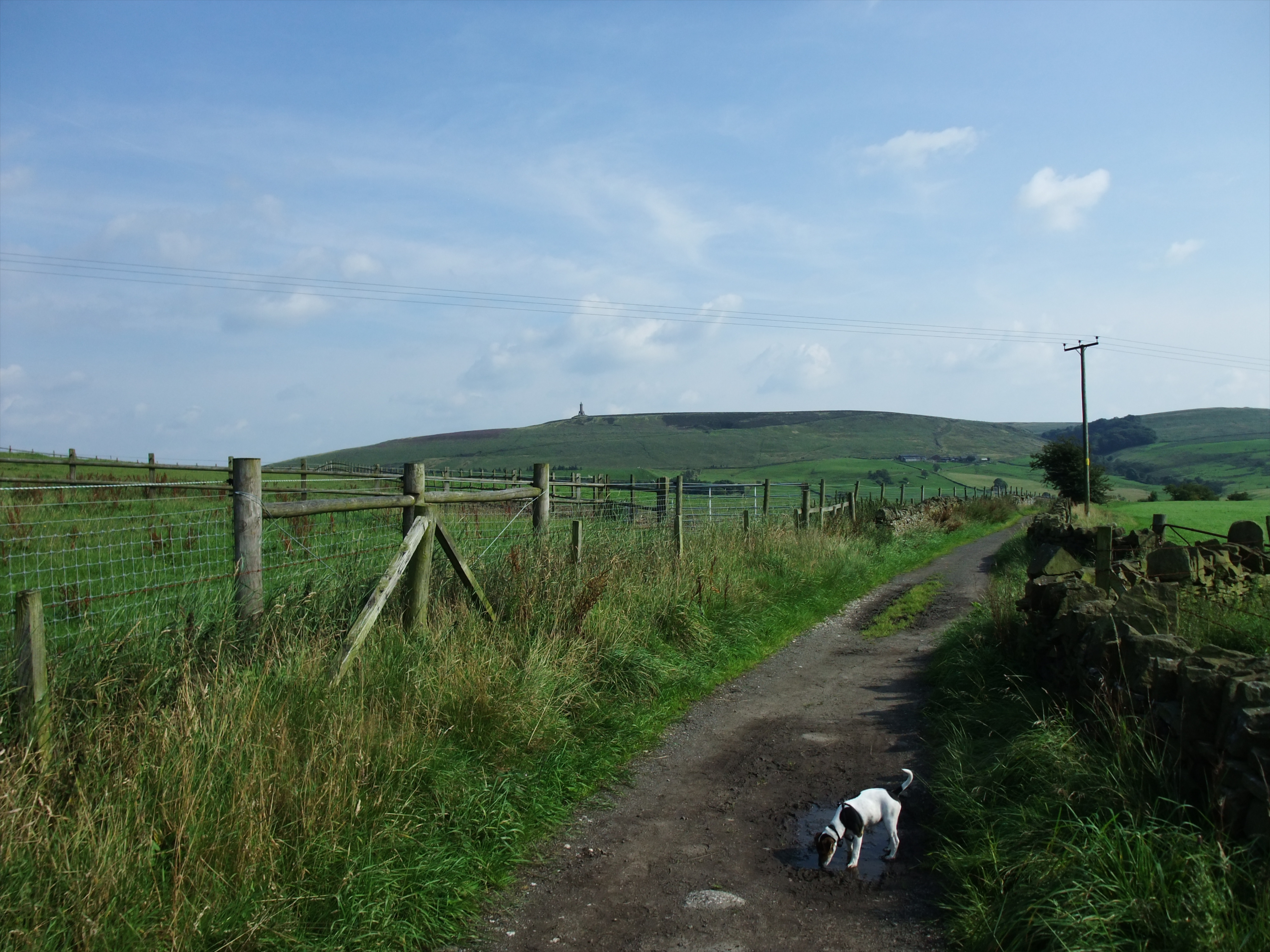
Tower view from Weasel Lane

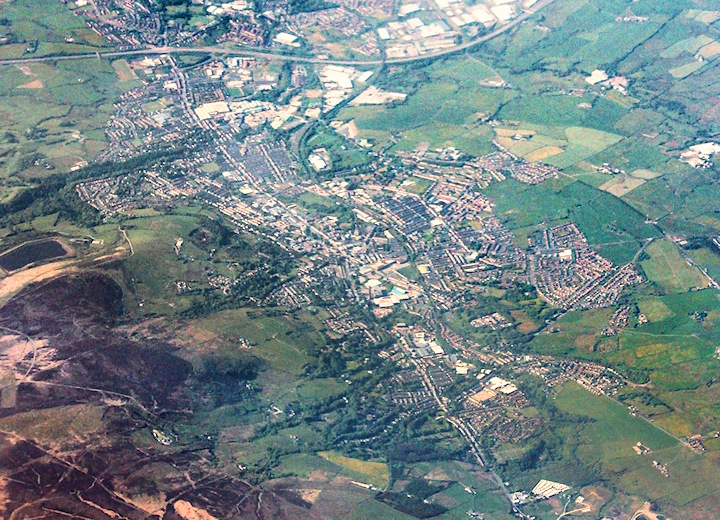
Aerial view of the town, with the M65 motorway visible at the top

== See also ==
- Darwen Cemetery
