= Bullimore =

Bullimore is a surname. Notable people with the surname include:

- Tony Bullimore (1939–2018), English sailor and businessman
- Wayne Bullimore (born 1970), English footballer
