= Listed buildings in Sutton-in-Ashfield =

Sutton-in-Ashfield is a market town in the Ashfield district of Nottinghamshire, England. The town and its surrounding area contain 13 listed buildings that are recorded in the National Heritage List for England. Of these, one is listed at Grade II*, the middle of the three grades, and the others are at Grade II, the lowest grade. The listed buildings consist of two churches, a headstone in a churchyard, houses, a public house, a former cotton mill and associated structures, and three war memorials.

== Key ==
| Grade | Criteria |
|---|---|
| II* | Particularly important buildings of more than special interest |
| II | Buildings of national importance and special interest |

== Buildings ==
| Name and location | Photograph | Date | Notes | Grade |
|---|---|---|---|---|
| Church of St Mary Magdalene; 53.12560°N 1.27010°W | | 12th century | The church has been altered and extended through the centuries, including alterations in 1854 and in 1867, and the spire was restored in 1885. The church is built in stone with slate roofs, and consists of a nave with a clerestory, north and south aisles, a south porch, a chancel with an organ chamber and a vestry, and a west steeple. The steeple has a tower with two stages, a moulded plinth, diagonal buttresses, a chamfered string course, coved eaves, an embattled parapet and a recessed spire with a weathercock. In the bottom stage is a doorway with a moulded surround and a hood mould, and the bell openings have two lights. | II* |
| The Manor House; 53.12578°N 1.26502°W | | Early 17th century | The house, to which a service range was added in the 18th century, is in stone on a plinth, and has a tile roof with coped gables and kneelers. There are two storeys and attics, five bays, a lower service wing to the rest, and at the rear is a three-storey stair tower. On the front is a gabled porch, most of the windows are casements with hood moulds, and there are two gabled dormers. | II |
| Headstone, Church of St Mary Magdalene; 53.12543°N 1.26991°W | | 1628 | The headstone in the churchyard is to the memory of Elizabeth Wright. It is in stone, it has a shouldered round head, and it carries an inscription. | II |
| Fulwood Farmhouse; 53.11475°N 1.28581°W | | c. 1700 | The farmhouse is in colourwashed brick, and has slate roofs with coped gables and kneelers. There are two storeys and attics, and a double depth plan with a front of two gabled bays. Most of the windows are mullioned casements, there are two circular windows, and on the side is a gabled porch with an elliptical-arched doorway. | II |
| Hunter's Bar; 53.12481°N 1.26520°W | | Early 18th century | A stone house, partly rendered with a slate roof, two storeys and attics, three bays, and a single-storey extension to the west. On the front is a flat-roofed porch, the windows are casements, and there are three flat-roofed dormers. | II |
| The Old Blue Bell; 53.12621°N 1.26494°W | | Mid 18th century | The public house is rendered, and has quoins, dentilled eaves, and pantile roofs with coped gables and kneelers. There are three storeys, two parallel ranges, a front of three bays, and rear extensions. The right corner is splayed and corbelled. The windows are a mix of mullioned casements and sashes. | II |
| Unwin's Mill; 53.12582°N 1.24512°W | | c. 1770 | The former cotton mill, which has been remodelled and converted for residential use, is in stone and brick with slate roofs. It is partly in two and partly in one storey, and has eight bays. It contains an ogee-headed carriage opening, a loading door and casement windows. | II |
| Unwin's Mill House and outbuildings 53.12604°N 1.24517°W | | Late 18th century | The house and attached outbuildings are in stone with slate roofs. The house has a sill band, moulded eaves, and a stepped coped gable. There are three storeys, a double depth plan and five bays. In the left bay is a two-storey canted bay window, and the other windows are a mix of sashes and casements. To the right are outbuildings converted for residential use, with two storeys. They contain carriage openings with segmental heads, doorways and casement windows. | II |
| The Windmill; 53.12117°N 1.26365°W | | c. 1820 | The former windmill is in stone on a plinth, and is partly tarred. It consists of a tapering conical tower with four stages, and is roofless. In the ground floor are two doorways, and above are casement windows. | II |
| United Reformed Church; 53.12280°N 1.26146°W | | 1905–06 | The church is in red brick with stone dressings and slate roofs. It consists of a nave and a chancel under a continuous roof, north and south transepts, vestries, a bell tower, and a southwest tower. The southwest tower has three stages, string courses, bands, a cornice with gargoyles, a shaped parapet with pinnacles, and a slim octagonal spire. In the bottom stage is a datestone, a double lancet window, and a doorway with a moulded surround. The middle stage contains slit windows, and the top stage has diagonal buttresses, and a double ogee louvred lancet window on each side. | II |
| Huthwaite War Memorial; 53.12793°N 1.29513°W | — | c. 1920 | The war memorial is in sandstone, and consists of a cenotaph with a stepped top. This stands on a chamfered pedestal, on a rectangular base of two steps with a flower trough. On the north side of the cenotaph is a bronze cross, and on the south side is a bronze wreath. The pedestal has a bronze tablet on the north side, and an inscription on the south side. | II |
| Sutton War Memorial; 53.12422°N 1.27157°W | | c. 1920 | The war memorial in the cemetery is in marble. It has a stepped square base, and a square pedestal on which is a statue of a standing soldier with a rifle. On the pedestal are recessed inscribed panels. The memorial is in a square paved area with obelisk boundary posts linked by chains. | II |
| Sutton in Ashfield War Memorial; 53.13080°N 1.25647°W | | 1921 | The war memorial is in an enclosure by a road junction, where it was moved in 2009. It is in sandstone, and consists of a wheel cross with a tapered shaft, on an octagonal plinth, on an octagonal base of three steps. On the plinth are slate tablets with inscriptions, and the names of those lost in the First World War and subsequent conflicts. | II |
