= Regency Dance Centre =

Municipal building in Sutton-in-Ashfield, Nottinghamshire, England

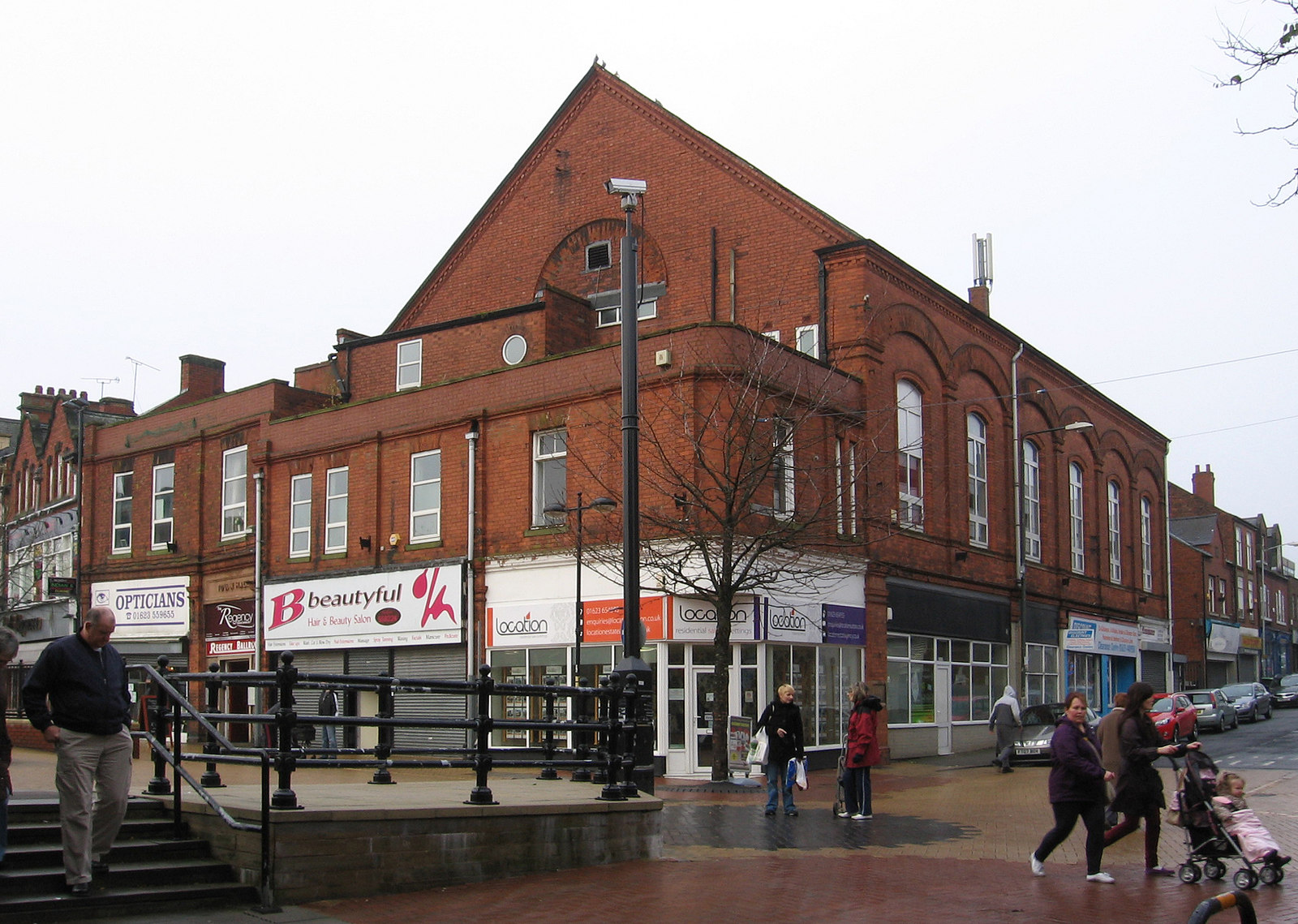
- The building in 2012

- Shown in Nottinghamshire
- 53.1245°N 1.2634°W
- Location: Market Place, Sutton-in-Ashfield

History
- Built: 1889

Site notes
- Architect: J. P. Adlington
- Architectural style: Victorian style

The Regency Dance Centre, formerly Sutton-in-Ashfield Town Hall, is a ballroom and former municipal building in Sutton-in-Ashfield, a town in Nottinghamshire, in England.

== History ==
In 1876, a group of local businessmen decided to form a company, to be known as the "Sutton-in-Ashfield Town Hall Company", to finance and commission a town hall for the town. The site they selected on the northwest side of the Market Place was purchased from the Unwin family of Sutton Hall who were significant landowners in the area as well as proprietors of the local textile mills. The foundation stone for the new building was laid by William Cavendish-Bentinck, 6th Duke of Portland, whose seat was at Welbeck Abbey, on 10 December 1888. It was designed by J. P. Adlington of High Pavement in Sutton-in-Ashfield in the Victorian style, built in red brick for £3,500 and was opened, with a performance of "Messiah" by George Frideric Handel, early the following year.

The original design involved a main frontage facing onto the Market Place. The front section, which was projected forward and fenestrated by shop fronts on the ground floor and by casement windows on the first floor, was surmounted by a balustrade and a balcony. The hall behind featured a modillioned gable, which contained a large oculus and was surmounted by a small clock tower. The entrance was on the Market Street frontage, which was fenestrated by six segmental headed windows flanked by pilasters supporting voussoirs, and was surmounted by a modillioned cornice. In 1906, the building was remodelled: a new entrance on the Market Place frontage was created, and the old entrance in Market Street was replaced by a shop. The balcony and clock tower were subsequently removed. This remodelling gave the building two halls, the larger of which was 90 feet (27 m) long and 45 feet (14 m) wide, while the smaller was 60 feet (18 m) long and 28 feet (8.5 m) wide.

A film was shown in the town hall for the first time in 1896, and from 18 November 1908, it operated as a full-time cinema. This closed in 1924, and the building became the Palais Dance Hall, which operated until 1930. In 1932, the Rialto Dance Hall opened, but closed during the Second World War. By the early 1980s, it had re-opened again and was operating as the Regency Ballroom. After being closed for 18 months, it started again under new management as the Regency Dance Centre in April 2009. The new management refurbished the building in 2010.

The management specialises in teaching ballroom dancing and Latin-American dancing. In February 2022, they organised an event entitled "Light Night Ashfield" which saw some 400 visitors to the ballroom, which was lit up in bright colours using neon lighting.
