= Our Lady Star of the Sea Church, Lowestoft =

Our Lady Star of the Sea Church
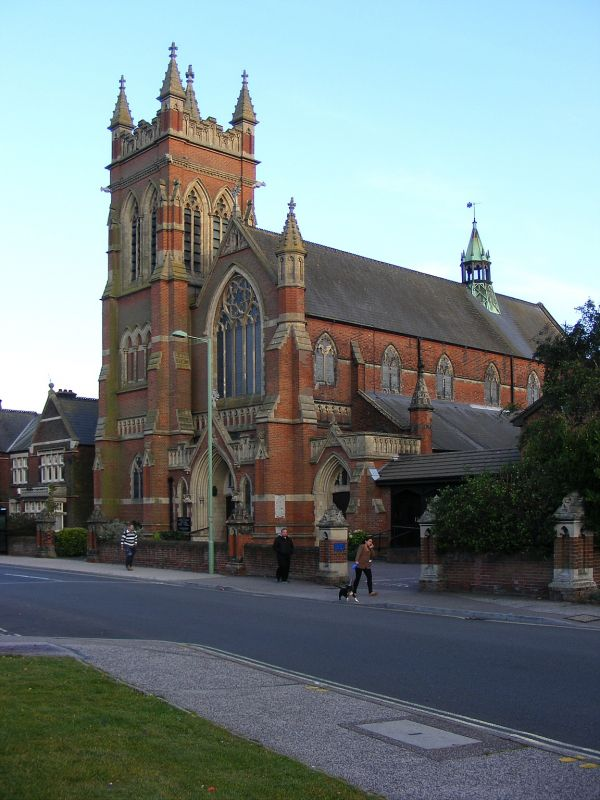
- Exterior
- Our Lady Star of the Sea Church
- 52.4771°N 1.7513°E
- Location: Lowestoft
- Country: England
- Denomination: Roman Catholic
- Website: OurLadyLowestoft.com

History
- Status: Parish church
- Founder: Diocese of Northampton
- Dedication: St Mary

Architecture
- Functional status: Active
- Heritage designation: Grade II listed
- Designated: 21 June 1993
- Architect(s): George Baines and F.W. Richards
- Style: Gothic Revival
- Groundbreaking: August 1900
- Completed: 5 June 1902

Administration
- Province: Westminster
- Diocese: East Anglia
- Deanery: Great Yarmouth

Our Lady Star of the Sea Church is a Roman Catholic Parish church in Lowestoft, Suffolk. It is situated on Gordon Road in the centre of the town. It was founded by the Diocese of Northampton in 1881 and it is now administered by the Diocese of East Anglia. The church is in the Arts and Crafts style. The architects were George Baines and F.W. Richards, and it is a Grade II listed building. It is the most easterly Catholic parish church in the British Isles.

== History ==
=== Foundation ===
From 1867, the Catholic community in Lowestoft was served by a Jesuit mission from St Mary's Church, Great Yarmouth. The small Catholic population worshipped in rooms hired in three different buildings in Lowestoft until a permanent chapel was established in a net loft in 1881, when the diocesan parish was founded under the leadership of Apostolic Missionary, Fr. Geoffrey Brennan. However, the chapel became too small to accommodate the increasing congregation, and under a new priest Fr. Alexander Scott, fundraising was started in order that a larger location could be bought.

=== Construction ===
Construction of the church began in August 1900 when the foundation stone was laid. The architects were from the local area: George Baines and F. W. Richards. They designed the church in the Arts and Crafts style. George Baines was born in 1852 and started work in Great Yarmouth. Although most of the churches he designed were for the Baptists, he also designed churches for other denominations. F. W. Richards had his practice on Stanley Street, Lowestoft, and also designed the Primitive Methodist Chapel in Oulton Broad, Suffolk. On 5 June 1902, the church was opened and it hosted its first Mass.

=== Developments ===
On 13 March 1976 the Diocese of Northampton split into two dioceses, continuing in the west as Northampton and in the east as a new Diocese of East Anglia with Lowestoft still the easternmost parish in the land.

In 2017, the church received £25,400 from the Heritage Lottery Fund, this was to help repair the exterior of the church building.

== Parish ==
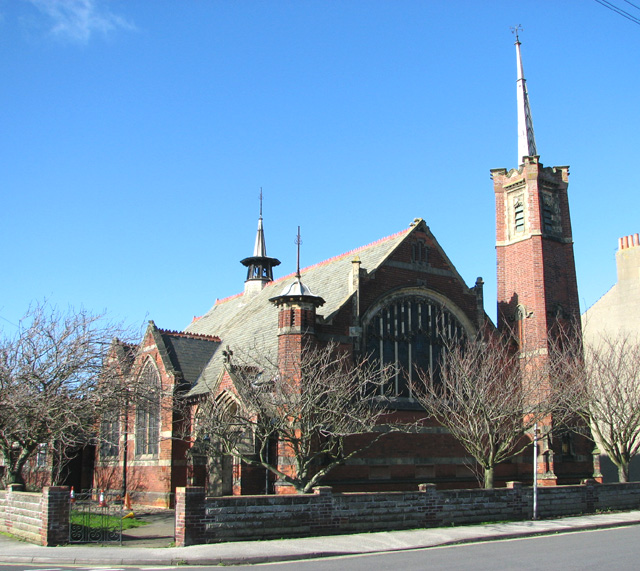
St Nicholas Church in Pakefield

St Nicholas' Church in Pakefield is in the same parish as Our Lady Star of the Sea Church and is a Grade II listed building. From 1955, there was a chapel of ease to Our Lady Star of the Sea Church in a former billiards hall. However, in 1995, the church bought a disused congregationalist church originally called South Cliff Congregational Church.

The former congregationalist church was also designed by George Baines and F. W. Richards and in the Arts and Crafts style. The foundation stone of the church was laid on 8 May 1902, a month before Our Lady Star of the Sea Church opened, and construction was paid for by Sir Jeremiah Colman. Some time after 1961, when the church was renamed Pakefield United Reformed Church, the church closed. In 1995, the Catholic community in Lowestoft bought the church from the United Reformed Church. On 11 August 1995, an ecumenical ceremony took place that involved the handing over of a Gospel book from the United Reformed Church to the Catholic community.

Our Lady Star of the Sea Church has two Sunday Masses at 5:00pm on Saturday and at 10:30am on Sunday. St Nicholas' Church has its Sunday Mass at 9:00am.

== See also ==
- Society of Jesus
- Diocese of East Anglia
