= Church of St Mary Magdalene, Sutton-in-Ashfield =

Church in Nottinghamshire, England

Coordinates: 53°07′31″N 01°16′12″W

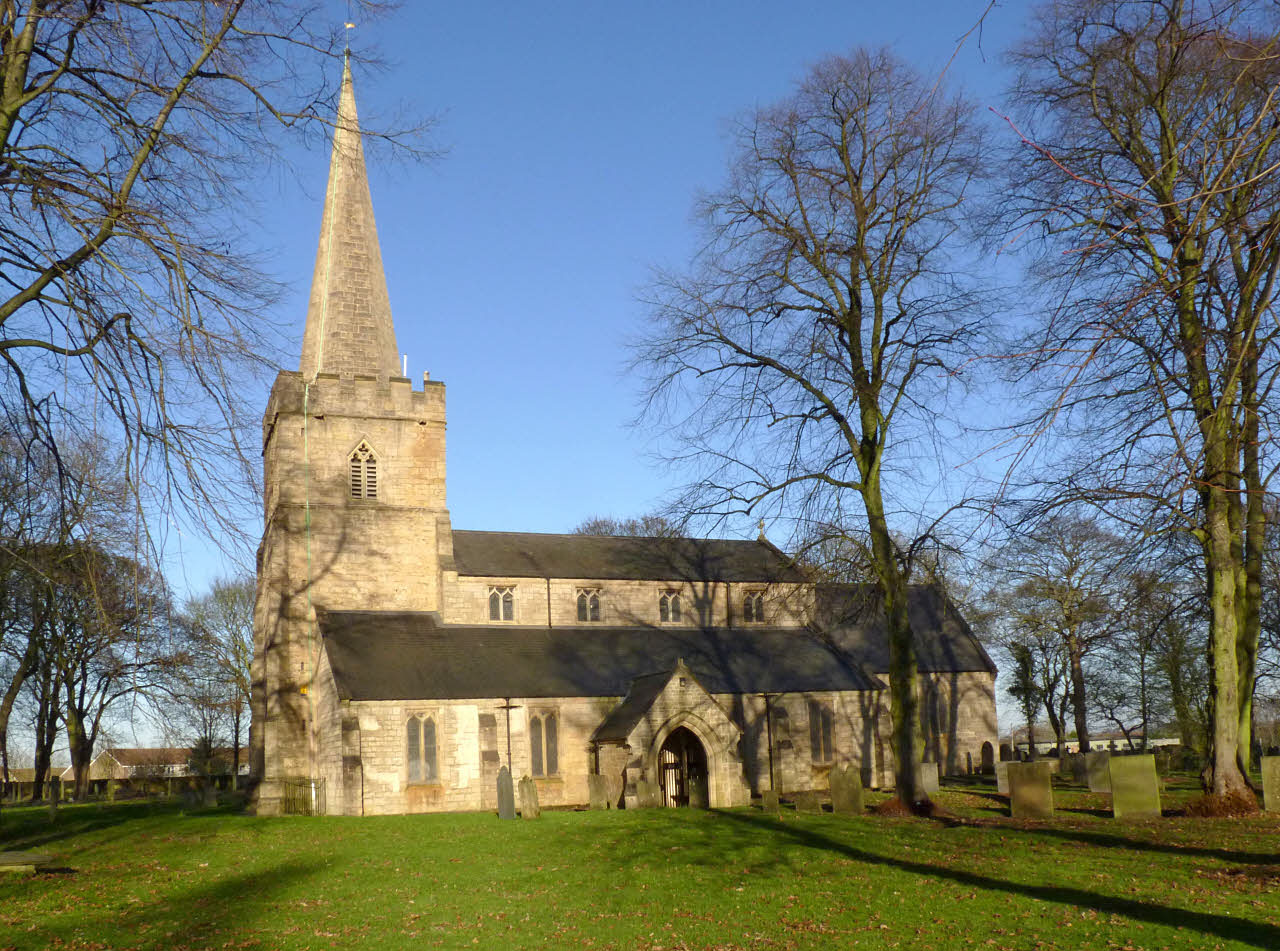
- Church of St Mary Magdalene, Sutton-in-Ashfield
- Denomination: Church of England
- Churchmanship: Modern Anglo-Catholic
- Website: http://www.stmarysutton.org.uk/

History
- Dedication: St Mary Magdalene

Administration
- Province: York
- Diocese: Southwell and Nottingham
- Archdeaconry: Newark
- Deanery: Newstead
- Parish: Sutton-in-Ashfield

Clergy
- Vicar: Rev Julie Cotterill

The Church of St Mary Magdalene, Sutton-in-Ashfield is a parish church in the Church of England in Sutton-in-Ashfield, Nottinghamshire. The church is Grade II* listed by the Department for Digital, Culture, Media and Sport as it is a particularly significant building of more than local interest.

== History ==
The church is medieval but was rebuilt in 1854 and 1867. It contains a rare 12th century pillar piscina and the remains of the font top from the original Norman church.

By American searches, on 5 July 1607, Edward FitzRandolph was baptised at St. Mary's Church Sutton, marrying Elizabeth Blossom in Scituate, Massachusetts - they are Barack Obama's 10x great-grandparents.

== See also ==
- Grade II* listed buildings in Nottinghamshire
- Listed buildings in Sutton-in-Ashfield
