= Sutton-in-Ashfield United Reformed Church =

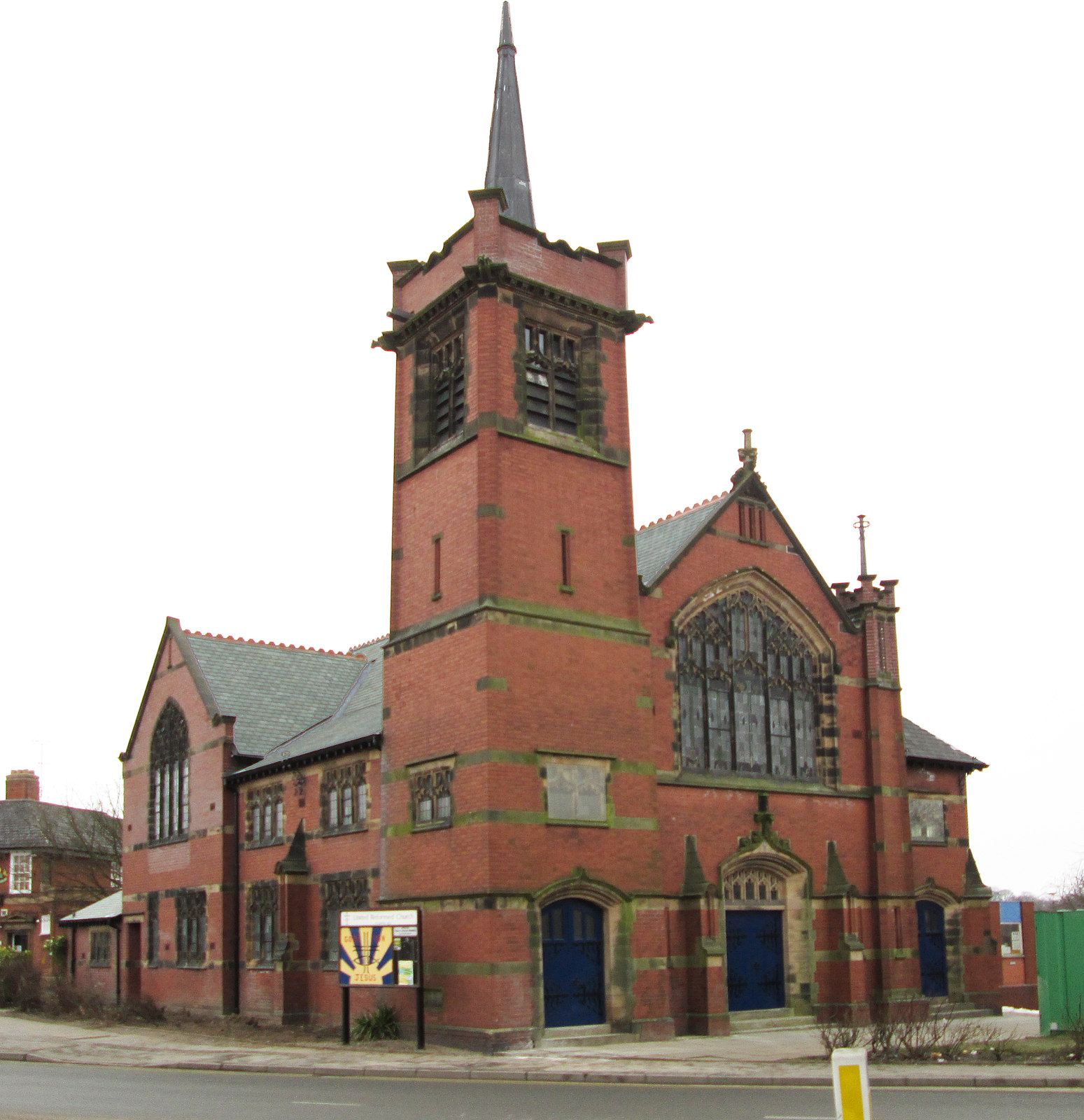
- Sutton-in-Ashfield United Reformed Church

- Location within Nottinghamshire
- 53°7′21.8″N 1°15′42″W
- Location: Sutton-in-Ashfield, Nottinghamshire
- Country: England
- Denomination: United Reformed
- Previous denomination: Congregational

History
- Former name: Sutton-in-Ashfield Congregational Church

Architecture
- Heritage designation: Grade II listed
- Architect(s): George Baines FRIBA and R. Palmer Baines
- Completed: 4 April 1906
- Construction cost: £5,600 (equivalent to £588,700 in 2025)

Specifications
- Capacity: 830 persons

Sutton-in-Ashfield United Reformed Church is a Grade II listed United Reformed church in Sutton-in-Ashfield, Nottinghamshire.

== History ==
The building was designed by the architects George Baines FRIBA and R. Palmer Baines and opened on 4 April 1906 by Mrs. Alliott of Nottingham and Rev. Clifton Somervell. It was faced externally with red bricks, with dressings and tracery of Derbyshire stone. The seating was circular radiating from the pulpit as a centre, and accommodation was provided for 830 persons. The contractor was Mr. Greenwood of Mansfield.

In 1972 the union between the Presbyterian Church of England and the Congregational Church in England and Wales formed the United Reformed Church and from then it was known as Bury Park United Reformed Church.

== Organ ==
The church had a 2 manual 19 stop pipe organ by Albert Keates of Sheffield dating from 1910.

== See also ==
- Listed buildings in Sutton-in-Ashfield
