= Bury Park United Reformed Church, Luton =

Bury Park United Reformed Church
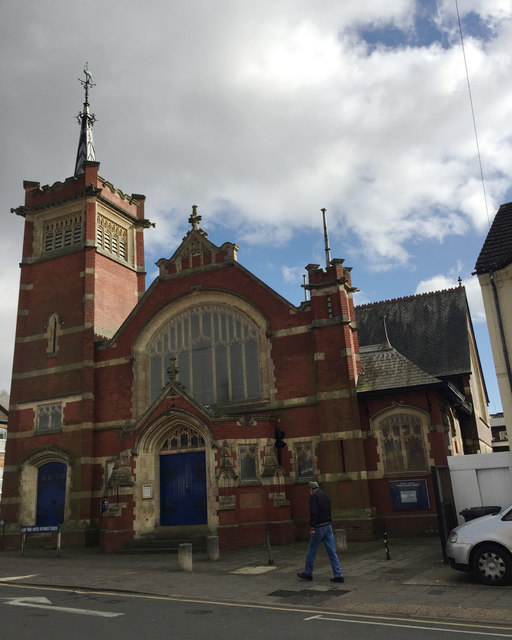
- Bury Park United Reformed Church

- Location within Bedfordshire
- 51°53′6.5″N 0°25′36″W
- Location: Luton, Bedfordshire
- Country: England
- Denomination: United Reformed
- Previous denomination: Congregational

History
- Former name: Bury Park Congregational Church

Architecture
- Heritage designation: Grade II listed
- Architect: George Baines
- Groundbreaking: 1895
- Completed: 1903
- Construction cost: £4,429 (equivalent to £465,600 in 2025)
- Closed: 9 July 2023

Specifications
- Capacity: 610 persons

Bury Park United Reformed Church is a Grade II listed former United Reformed church in Luton, Bedfordshire.

== History ==
The initiative to build the chapel came from the King Street Congregational Chapel. The foundation stone was laid on 3 June 1895 and the opening services in the new temporary building took place on 9 October 1895 The construction cost £800.

Fundraising for the permanent building took some time. On 7 April 1903 the foundation stone was laid and on 18 November 1903 it was opened for worship. It was built in the perpendicular gothic style to the designs of the architect George Baines. It was faced with red brick with Costessey stone dressings. Four red granite columns support the four crossing arches within.

In 1972 the union between the Presbyterian Church of England and the Congregational Church in England and Wales formed the United Reformed Church and from then it was known as Bury Park United Reformed Church.

The congregation amalgamated with the other United Reformed Churches in Luton and the building closed its doors for worship after a service on 9 July 2023.

== Organ ==
The church has a 2 manual 13 stop pipe organ by Norman and Beard. It cost £430 and was opened on 19 February 1906 by Mr. F. Gostclow FRCO ARAM.
