= Sutton-in-Ashfield =

Market town in Nottinghamshire, England

Coordinates: 53°07′30″N 1°15′40″W

- Town
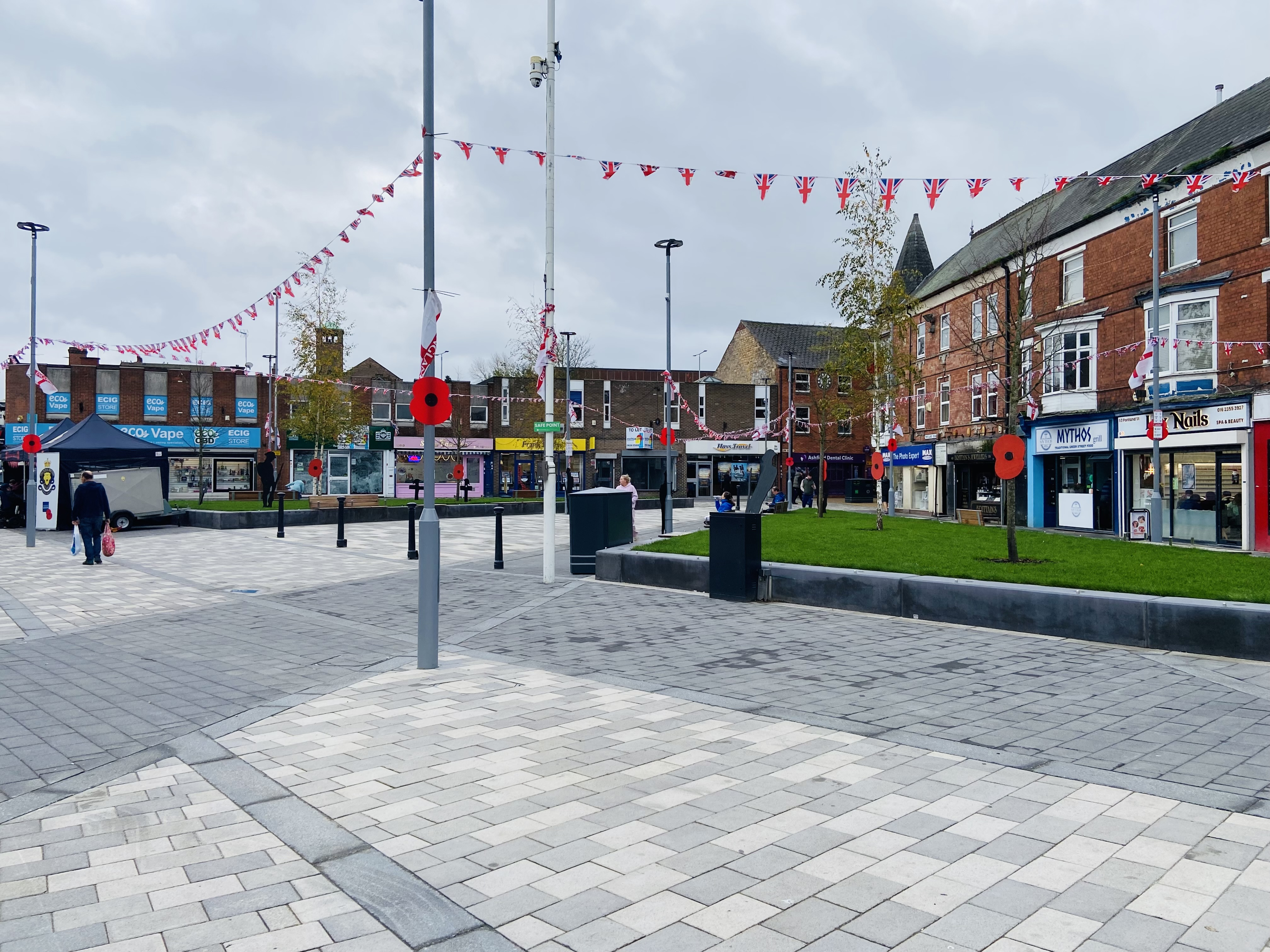
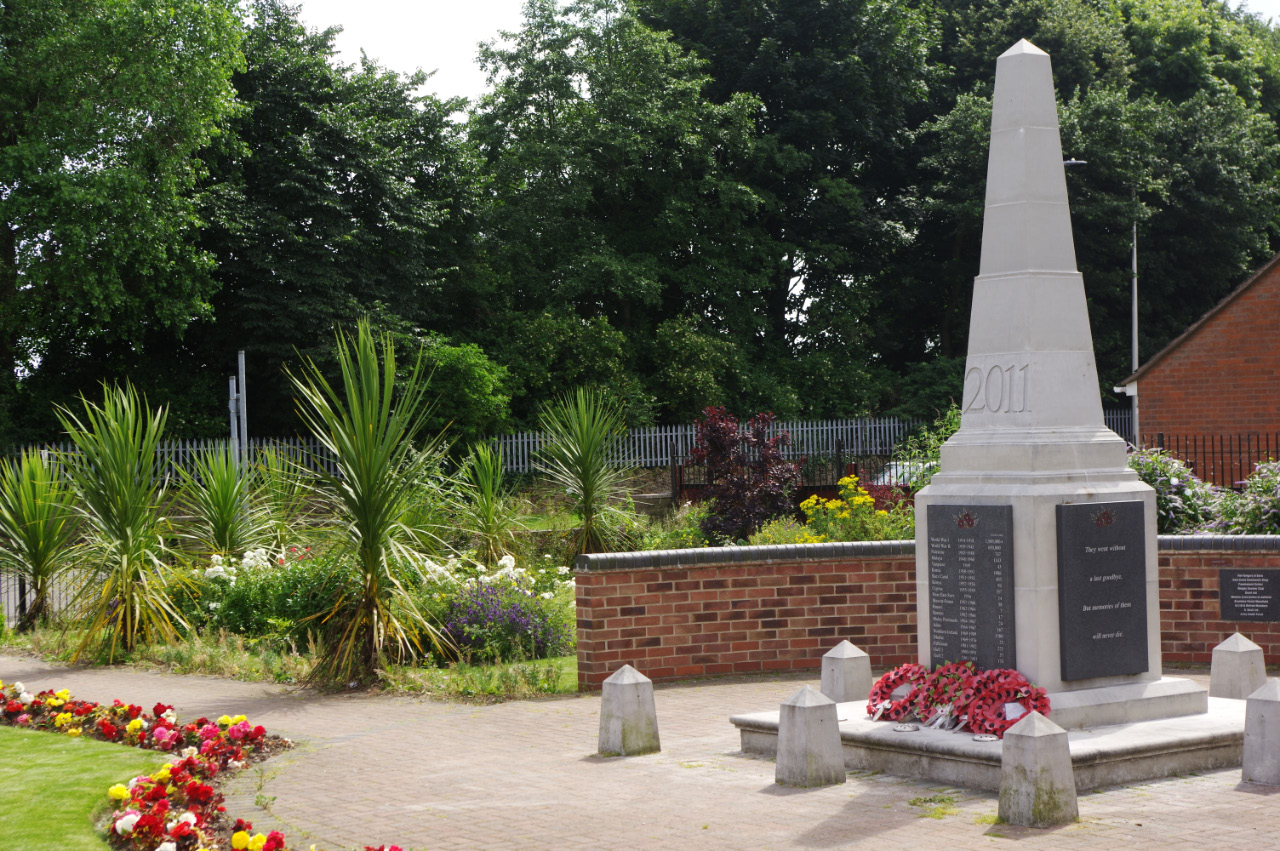
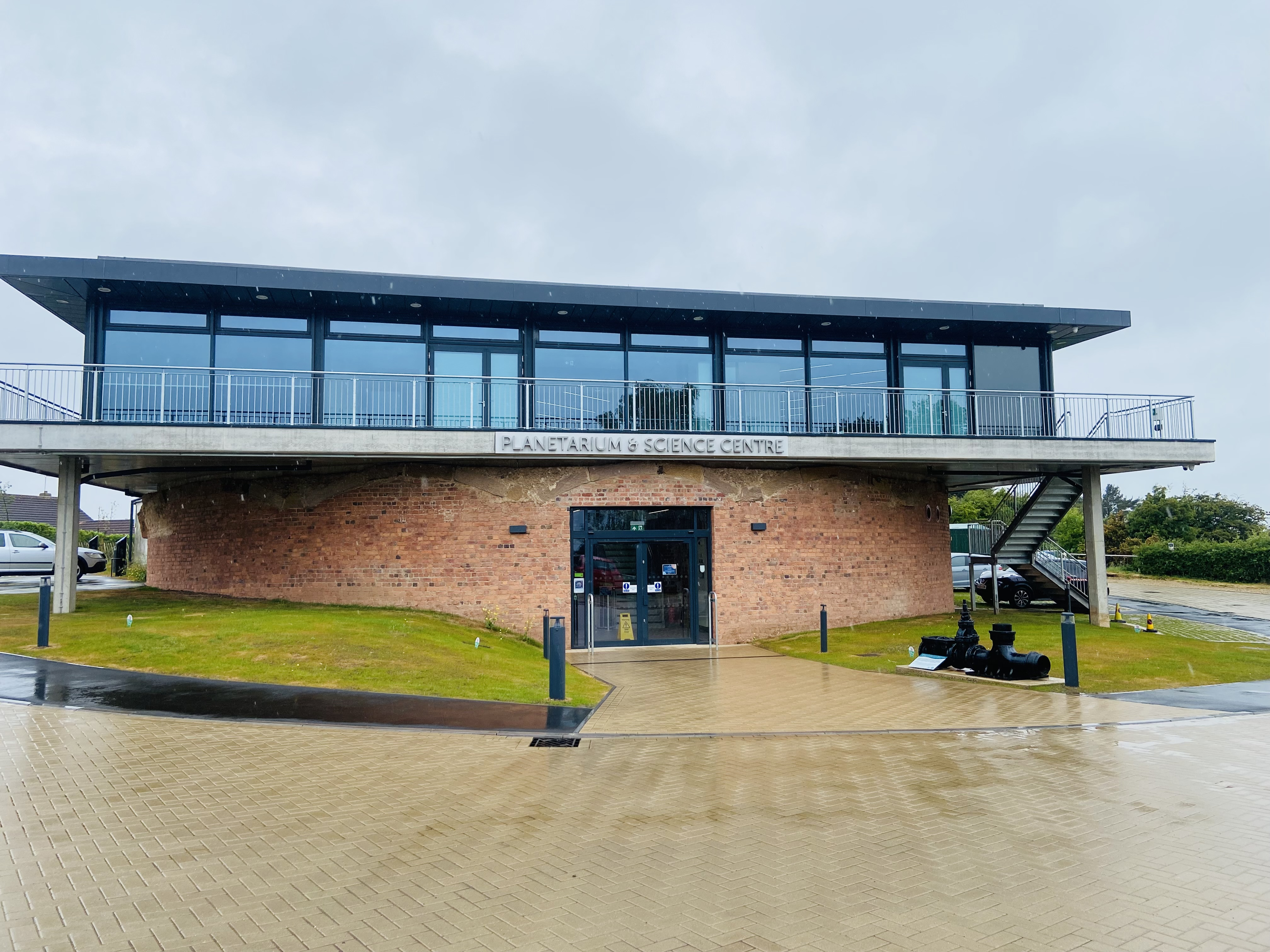
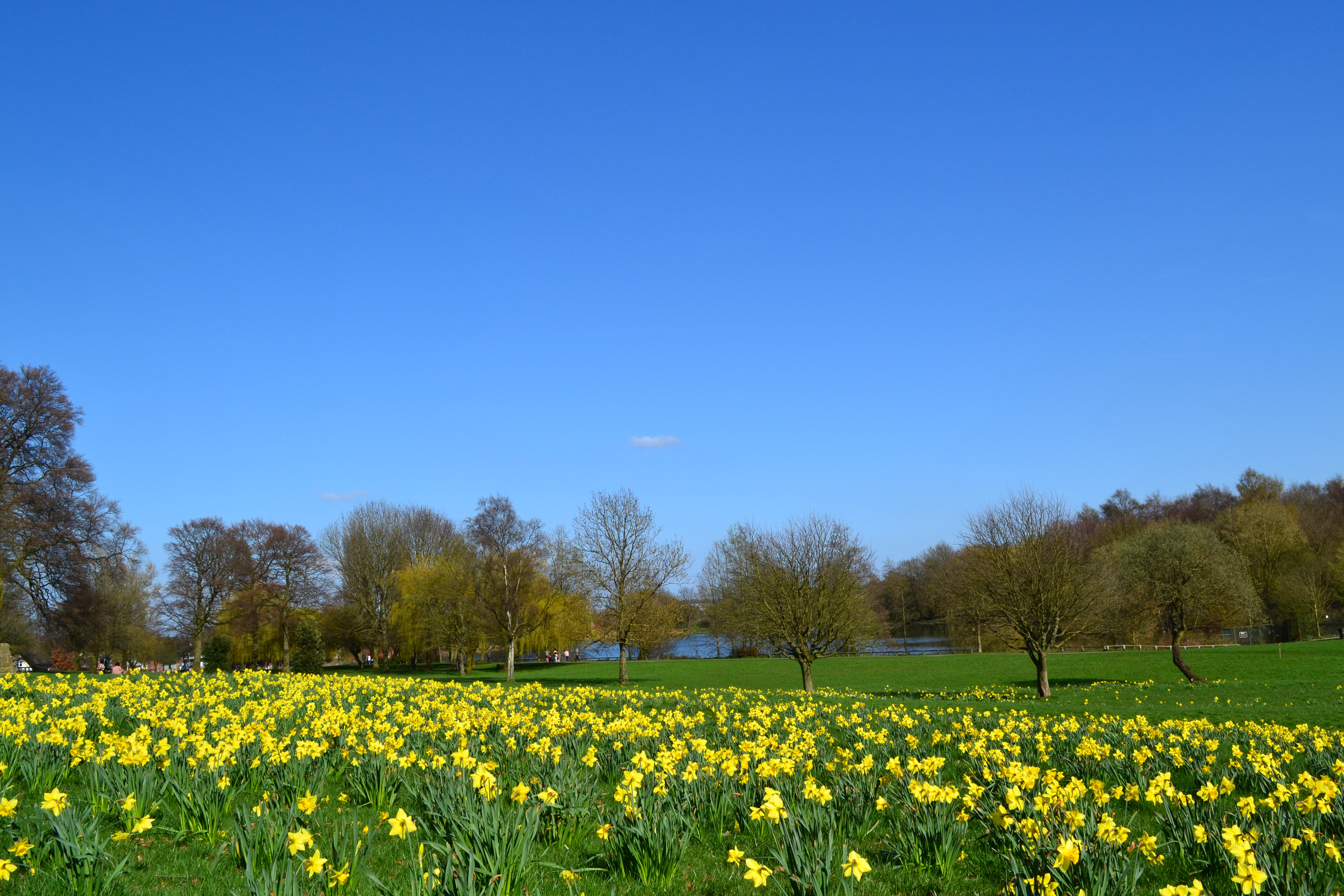
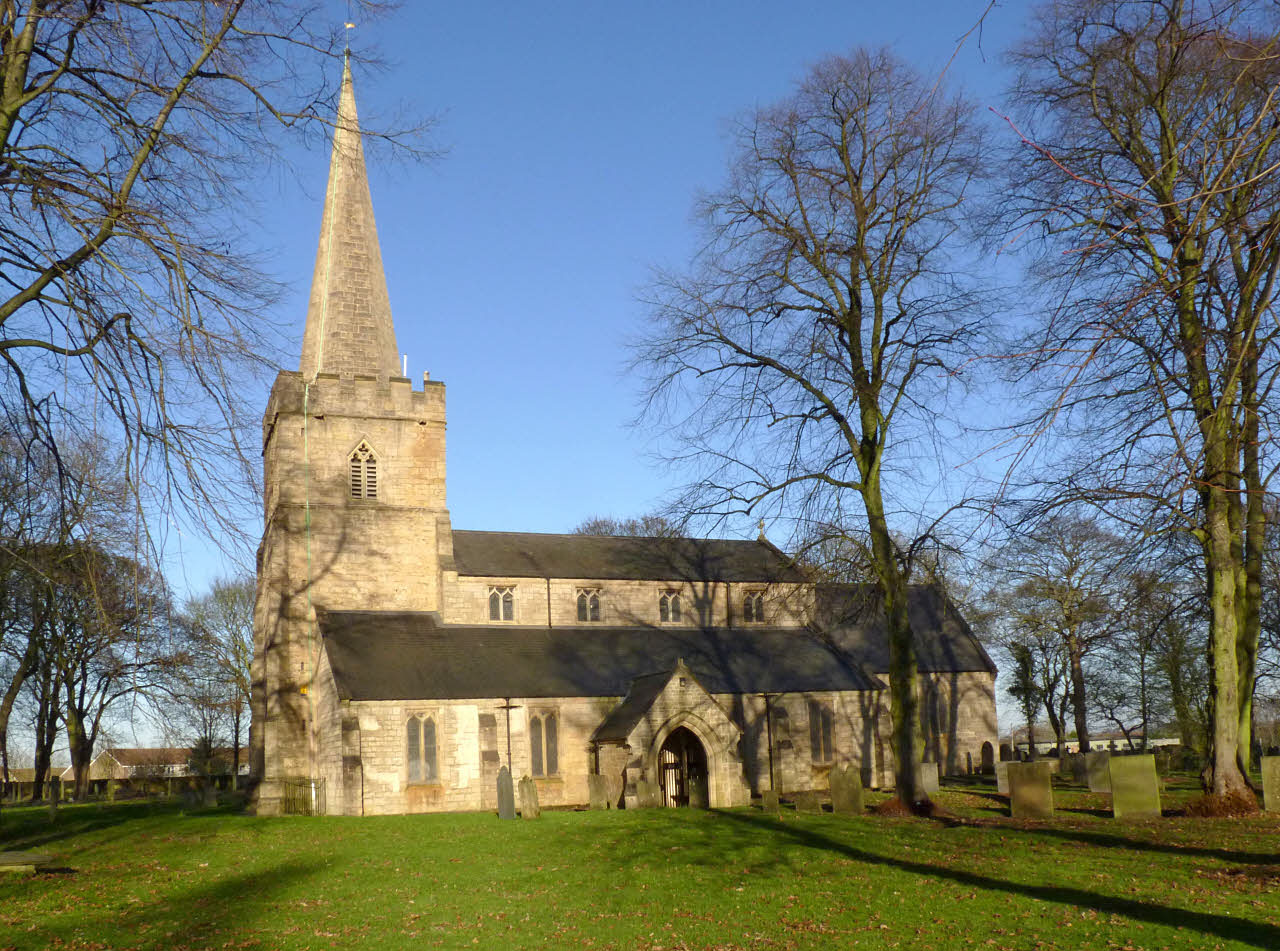
- Portland Square War memorial The Observatory Sutton Lawn St Mary Magdalene

- Location within Nottinghamshire
- Population: 36,404 (2021 Census)
- OS grid reference: SK 49446 58935
- District: Ashfield
- Shire county: Nottinghamshire
- Region: East Midlands
- Country: England
- Sovereign state: United Kingdom
- Areas of the town: List: Fackley; Huthwaite; Skegby; Stanton Hill; Teversal; Town Centre
- Post town: Sutton-in-Ashfield
- Postcode district: NG17
- Dialling code: 01623
- Police: Nottinghamshire
- Fire: Nottinghamshire
- Ambulance: East Midlands
- UK Parliament: Ashfield
- Website: ashfield.gov.uk

Sutton-in-Ashfield is a market town in Nottinghamshire, England, with a population of 36,404 in 2021. It is the largest town in the district of Ashfield, 4 miles (6 km) west of Mansfield, 2 miles (3 km) from the Derbyshire boundary and 12 miles (19 km) north of Nottingham.

== History ==
The area was first settled in the Saxon times and the Saxon suffix "ton" means "an enclosure or fenced in clearing". The town appears in the Domesday Book in 1086 as "Sutone".

Sutton-in-Ashfield, like Mansfield, was part the land of Edward the Confessor and later the land of William the Conqueror upon the Norman Conquest in 1066. Both towns are situated close to the ancient Sherwood Forest.

There are also documents from 1189 showing that Gerard, son of Walter de Sutton, gave two bovates of land and the church at Sutton to Thurgarton Priory.

Edward the Confessor and William the Conqueror were also the lord of the manor house of Sutton in Ashfield.

In the 16th century the former manor house was passed unto James Hardwick, the brother of Countess of Shrewsbury Bess of Hardwick. On the death of her brother Bess passed the manor house unto her daughter Mary Talbot.

The sick and disgraced (about the annulment of Henry VIII and Catherine of Aragon) Cardinal Wolsey travelled through Sutton in Ashfield in 1530 via "Carr Sike Lane" which is now known as Carsic. He stayed at Kirkby Hardwick which belonged to the George Talbot, 6th Earl of Shrewsbury.

Sutton Lawn, was the home of Sutton Hall, the former home of Samuel Unwin who moved to the town from London in the eighteenth century and became a textile merchant.

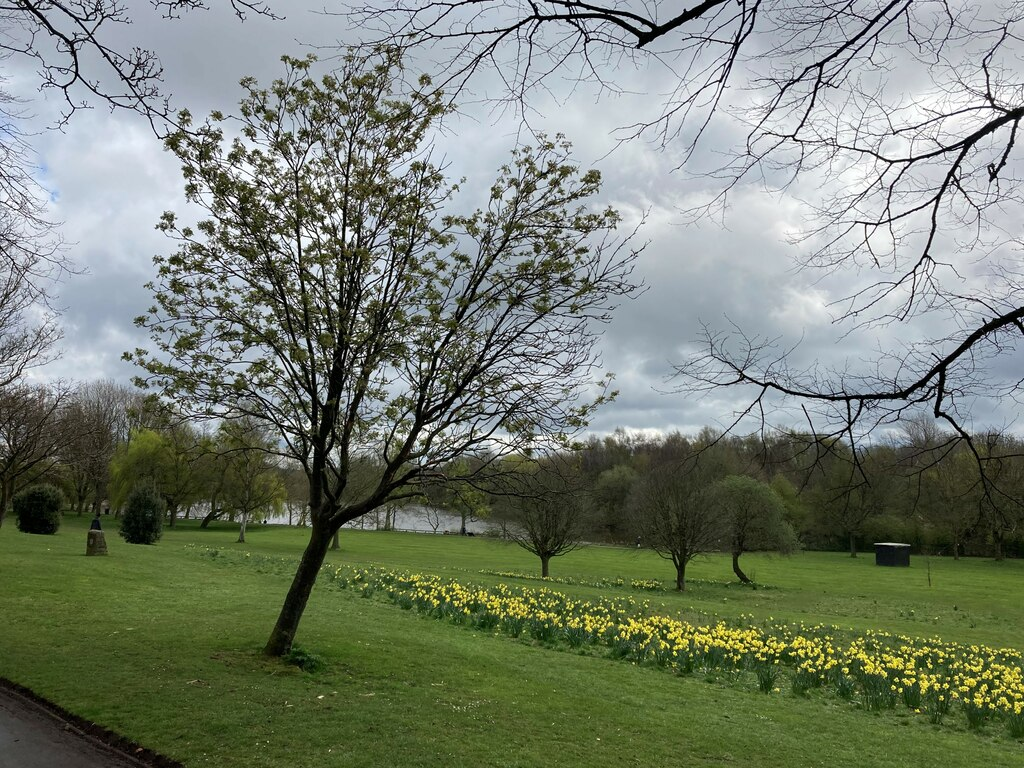
Sutton Lawn

== Geography ==
For demographic purposes Sutton-in-Ashfield is included in the Mansfield Urban Area, although it administratively forms part of the separate council district of Ashfield, which is based in Kirkby-in-Ashfield. To the north is Teversal, Skegby and Stanton Hill.

== Economy ==
=== Regeneration ===
The Sutton Town Centre Spatial Masterplan (2019) sets out the investment and regeneration for Sutton in Ashfield. Projects have included the Portland Square renovation, the creation of the Cornerstone Theatre, and new car park, pop up market. The former Wilco store in Portland Square is set to become a campus for students at Vision West Nottinghamshire College. This work is currently underway.

A new waterside restaurant has been built at Kings Mill Reservoir, the restaurant is meant to be opening in spring 2026.

A major new employer arrived in the area when Amazon created in 2020 a new warehouse and distribution facility, known as a "fulfilment centre", with the promise of 1,000 new vacancies. It is situated at Summit Park, just off the MARR road, on the outskirts of Sutton in Ashfield, close to the boundary with Mansfield. Mansfield's MP Ben Bradley stated it was fortunate that the development would help to mitigate slightly the harmful financial effects of COVID-19 restrictions on the community.

The Sherwood Observatory area was developed by creating a planetarium and science discovery centre in 2023. The facility was financed by £5.3 million in grants, National Lottery funding, the government's Towns Fund via Ashfield District Council and private donations.

=== Industrial Revolution ===
==== Coal mining ====
Sutton Colliery was outside of the town in Stanton Hill. It closed in 1989.

==== Hosiery ====
Pretty Polly hosiery originated in the town around 1927 and was manufactured on Unwin Road until April 2005. Samuel Eden Socks closed in July 2005.

== Landmarks ==
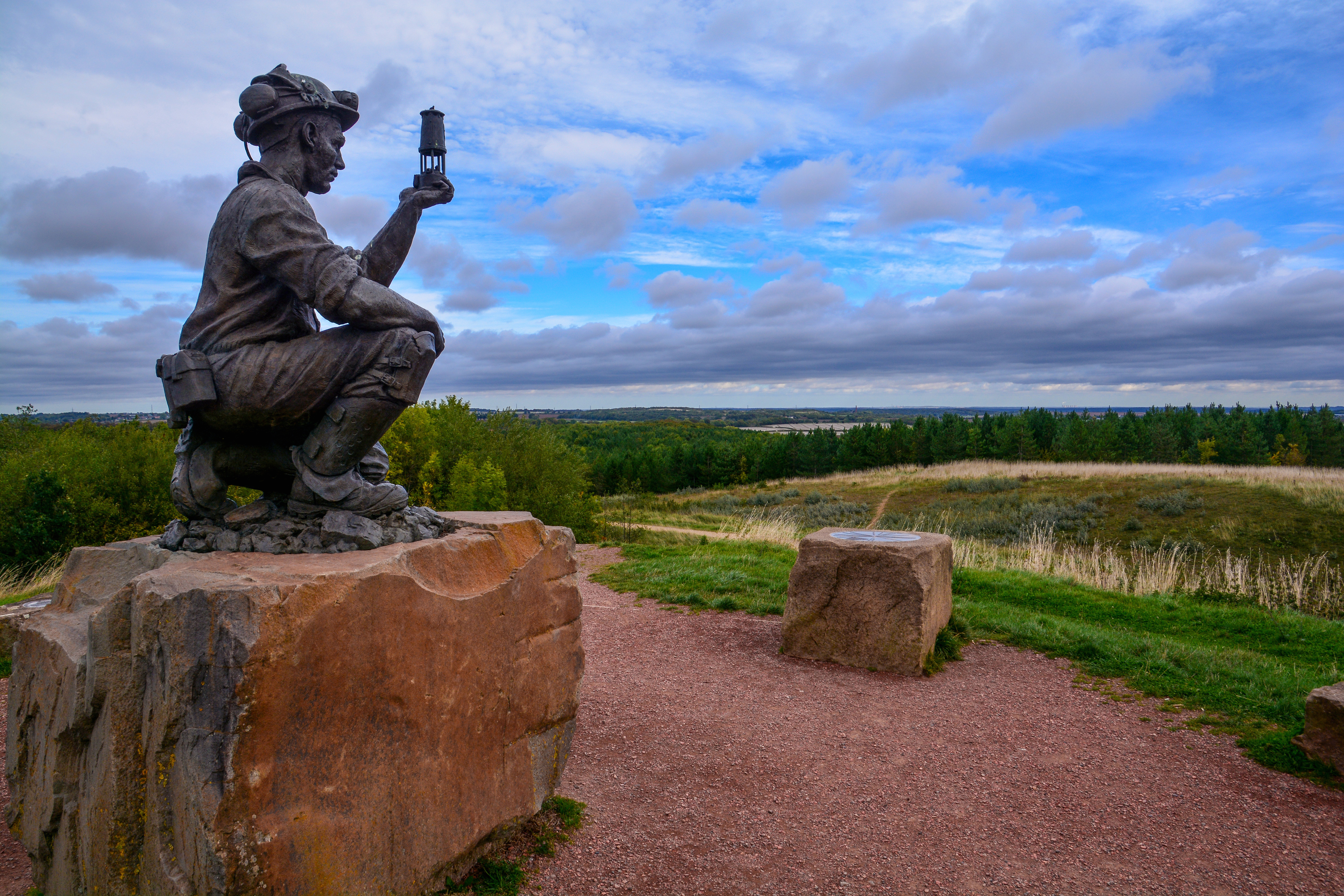
Testing for Gas monument at Silverhill

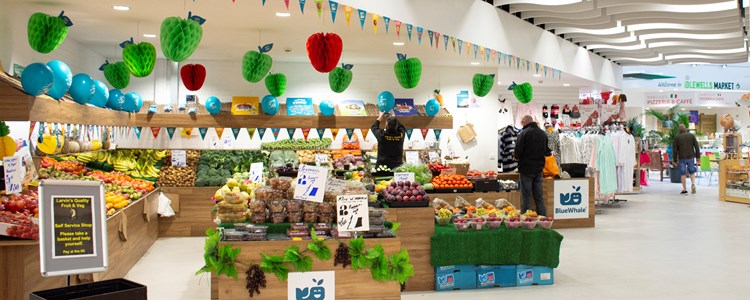
The Idlewells Indoor Market.

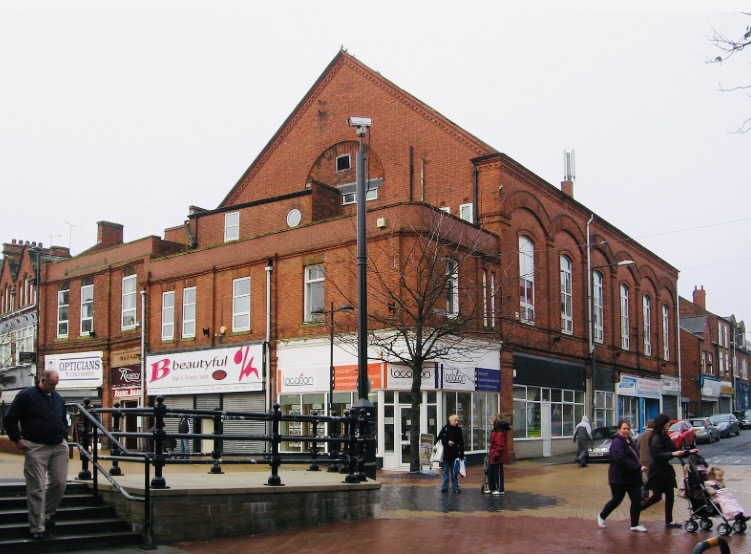
The Regency Dance Centre, formerly Sutton-in-Ashfield Town Hall

Sutton-in-Ashfield was home to what was the largest sundial in Europe. It was located in the middle of Portland Square, adjacent to the Idlewells Shopping Centre and Sutton Community Academy. The sundial was unveiled on 29 April 1995 and was removed in late 2024 Sutton-in-Ashfield Town Hall opened in 1889 and later served as a cinema before becoming the Regency Dance Centre.

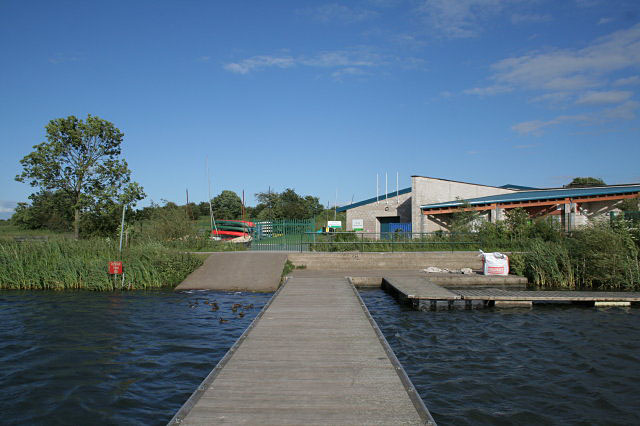
The Mill Adventure Centre

The former site of Silverhill Colliery, close to the village of Teversal on the north-west edge of Ashfield, has been transformed from the colliery to a woodland. At the highest point is the "Testing for Gas" monument, by Antony Dufort, erected in 2004.

King's Mill Hospital is between Sutton-in-Ashfield and Mansfield, next to the A38.

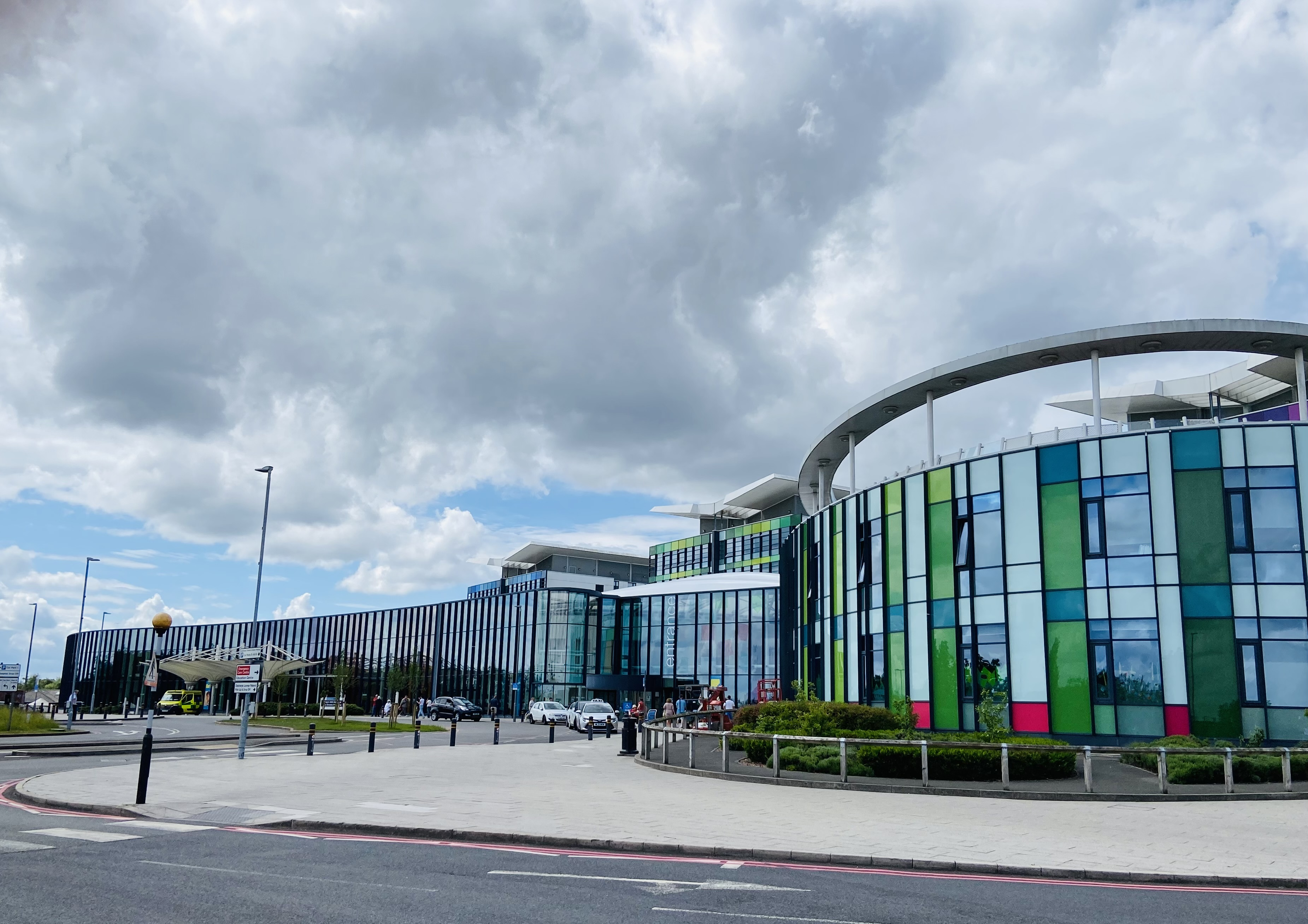
Kings Mill Hospital

The town has a supermarket that, in April 1999, held the first blessing ceremony and reception to take place in a UK supermarket. It had been unable to get a wedding ceremony licence.

The Sherwood Observatory is located on the B6139 and is run by the Mansfield and Sutton Astronomical Society.

== Churches ==
The Sutton-in-Ashfield area was first settled in Saxon times and the first records of a place of worship in the area date from Norman times (1170). As the population of the settlement grew so the variety of religious denominations represented increased. This was particularly true during the industrial expansion of the nineteenth century. The following is a list of the churches that still have a presence in Sutton, together with brief historical details.

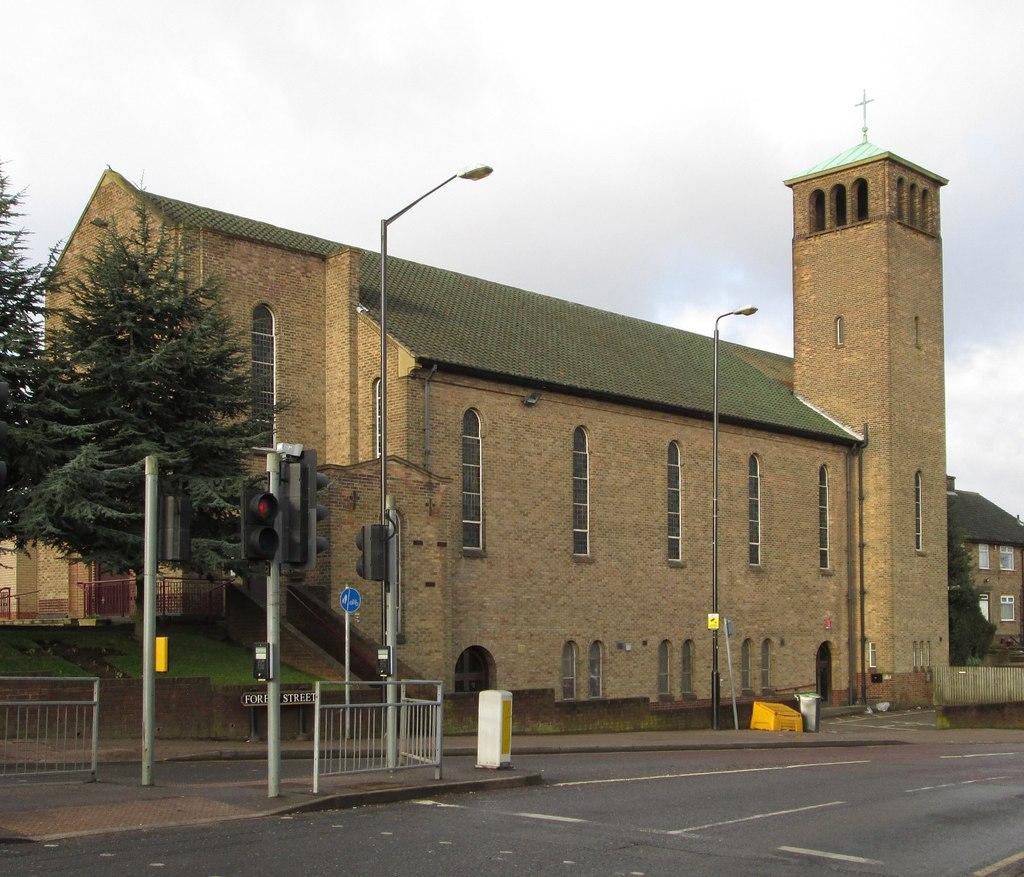
Church of St Joseph the Worker

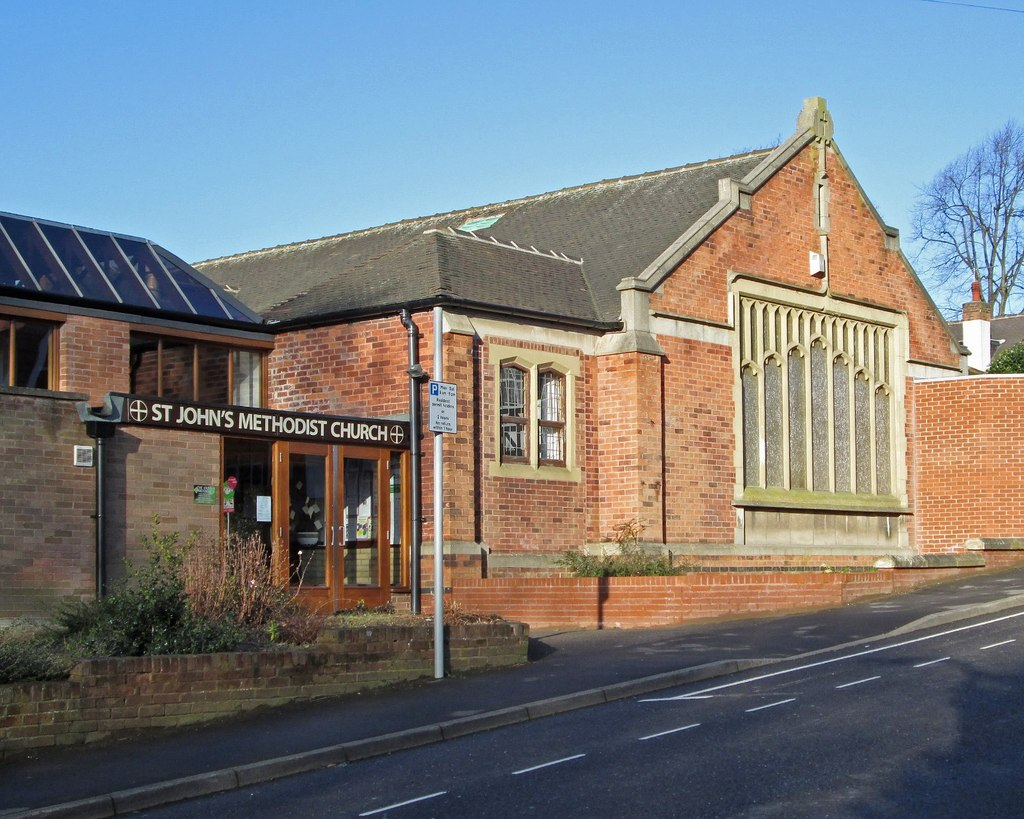
Church of St John

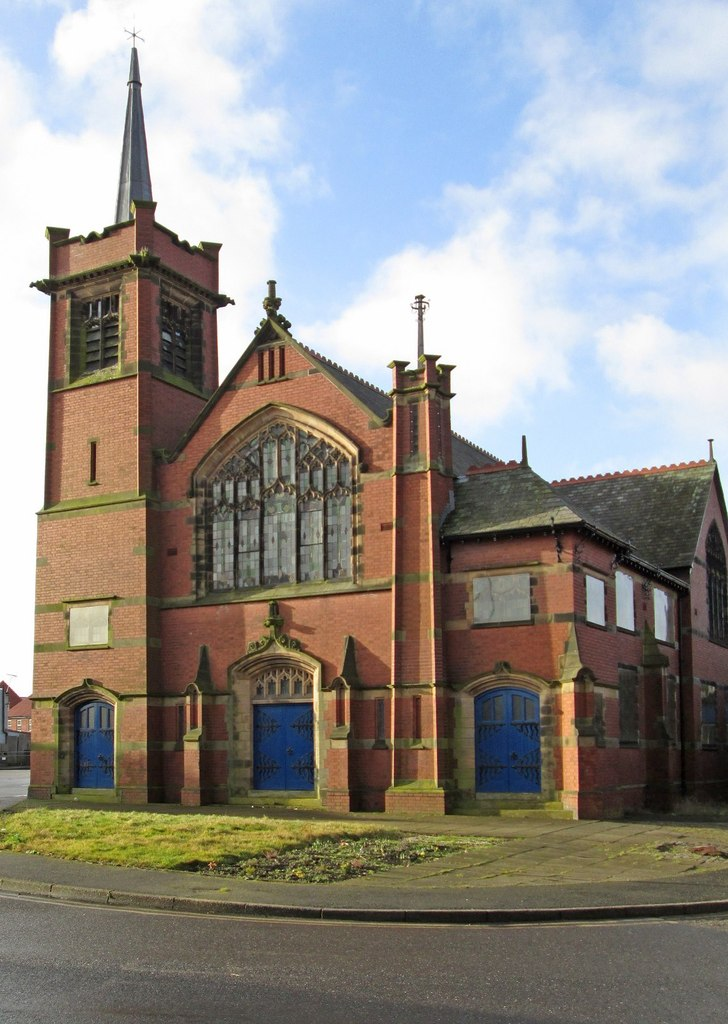
United Reformed Church

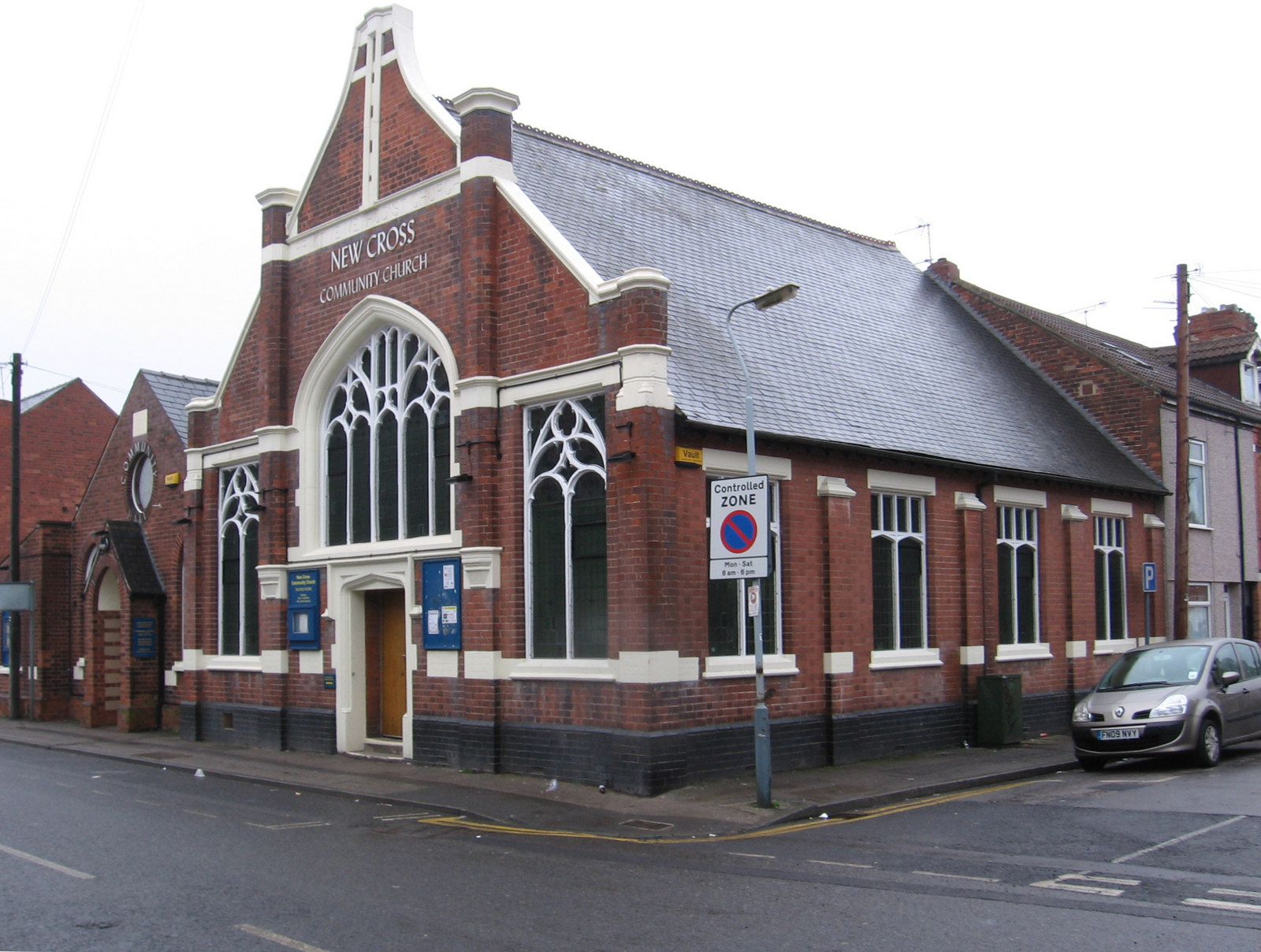
New Cross Community Church

=== Church of St Mary Magdalene ===
This Anglican church, situated off Lammas Road and built in local stone, contains a few parts that date back to 1170. The tower and spire date from 1395. However, much of the rest of the church was subject to re-building in the second half of the nineteenth century. The church is a Grade II* listed building.

By American searches, on 5 July 1607, Edward Fitzrandolph was baptised at St. Mary's Church Sutton, marrying Elizabeth Blossom in Scituate, Massachusetts - they are Barack Obama's 10x great-grandparents.

=== Church of St Michael and All Angels ===
This was another Anglican church in Sutton, situated at the junction of Outram Street with St Michael's Street. The church was built in two stages. The first stage was designed by James Fowler (architect) of Louth and opened in 1887. The second stage was designed by Louis Ambler and completed in 1909. The church building is still standing but is no longer in use for worship.

=== Church of St Joseph the Worker ===
In the early part of the twentieth century, Catholics worshipped in one another's homes or in a room above a garage off of Outram Street. In 1961, a full-size church was opened in Forest Street. This was designed in a Romanesque style with a 70 feet tall bell tower.

=== Church of St John ===
In 2015, Methodism in Sutton-in-Ashfield is represented by St John's Methodist Church in Titchfield Avenue. This church was built (and later extended) in the twentieth century. Over the years, there have been Methodist churches in several locations around the town:

- There were Primitive Methodist churches on Mansfield Road (built 1866, now a Zion Baptist Church) and at New Cross (built 1895, now the Ecumenical Partnership Community Church).
- There was a Wesleyan Methodist Chapel on the south side of Outram Street. This was erected in 1882. An adjoining Sunday School in Welbeck Street was opened in 1904 and was demolished around 2011.

=== United Reformed Church ===
This church on High Pavement was opened in 1906. The architects of the building were G. Baines & Son of London and the builders were J. Greenwood's of Mansfield. Mainly because of the unusual nature of the pews inside, it is a Grade II Listed Building.

=== New Cross Community Church ===
This was built in 1895 as a Primitive Methodist Church. It is now run by the New Cross Community Church Anglican/Methodist Local Ecumenical Partnership.

=== Zion Baptist Church ===
This was built in 1866 as a Primitive Methodist Chapel. It is now a Zion Baptist Church and is closely associated with the adjoining Eastside Community Centre.

== Transport ==
=== Road ===
The town is located about two miles from Junction 28 of the M1 motorway and accessed via the A38.

The A38 Bypass, which opened in July 1989, is a wide single-carriageway that passes through much of the eastern part of the town, meeting the A617 Mansfield Bypass at Kings Mill. The bypass cost £16m, being built by A.F. Budge of Retford. The Coxmoor Road to Station Road section was opened in March 1988 by the Nottinghamshire County Council chairman.

The former main road through the town centre is now identified as the B6023 and includes Alfreton Road, Lammas Road, Priestsic Road and Mansfield Road. Other main roads include Kirkby Road, Station Road, Huthwaite Road and Outram Street.

=== Buses ===
Sutton-in-Ashfield is served by Trentbarton which provides regular bus services from Nottingham, Mansfield and Derby and Stagecoach East Midlands with its Mansfield Miller 1 route between Mansfield and Alfreton, with service to the East Midlands Designer Outlet. The bus station is located next to the Idlewells Shopping Centre.

=== Rail ===
The town was served by five stations. Only one is now open:

- Sutton Junction on the Robin Hood Line which closed in the 1960s.
- Sutton Parkway which now serves the town on the Robin Hood Line which has since the 1990s provided the town with regular rail service between Nottingham and Worksop. The station is two miles south of the town centre at the junction of Low Moor Road (B6021) towards Kirkby-in-Ashfield and Penny Emma Way. The railway was formerly mostly used by the area's pits, which closed in the early 1990s.
- Sutton-in-Ashfield Central was on the now-defunct Mansfield Railway and the station was located south of the town centre. The site is now occupied by a steel merchant.
- Sutton General which was on a very short branch from Sutton Junction. The station was closed to passengers in the 1920s and the site is now occupied by a retail store.
- Sutton-in-Ashfield Town which was on the branch line from Nottingham Victoria to Shirebrook North. The station closed in 1931 and the line in 1968. The site has been razed but the old abandoned station master's house can be seen, in a state of decay. The line is now part of the Skegby Trail.

== Media ==
=== Television ===
The town receives its television signals from various regional transmitters: Belmont (BBC Yorkshire and Lincolnshire/ITV Yorkshire East), Emley Moor (BBC Yorkshire/ITV Yorkshire West), and Waltham (BBC East Midlands/ITV Central).

=== Radio ===
Takeover Radio 106.9FM, Ashfield's OFCOM licenced community radio station, broadcasts across the district from studios in Sutton in Ashfield. Other local radio stations are BBC Radio Nottingham on 95.5 FM, Capital Midlands on 96.5 FM and community based station, Mansfield 103.2 FM which broadcast from nearby Mansfield.

=== Newspapers ===
The town is served by the local newspaper, Mansfield and Ashfield Chad.

== Recreation ==
=== Sport ===
==== Recreation facilities ====
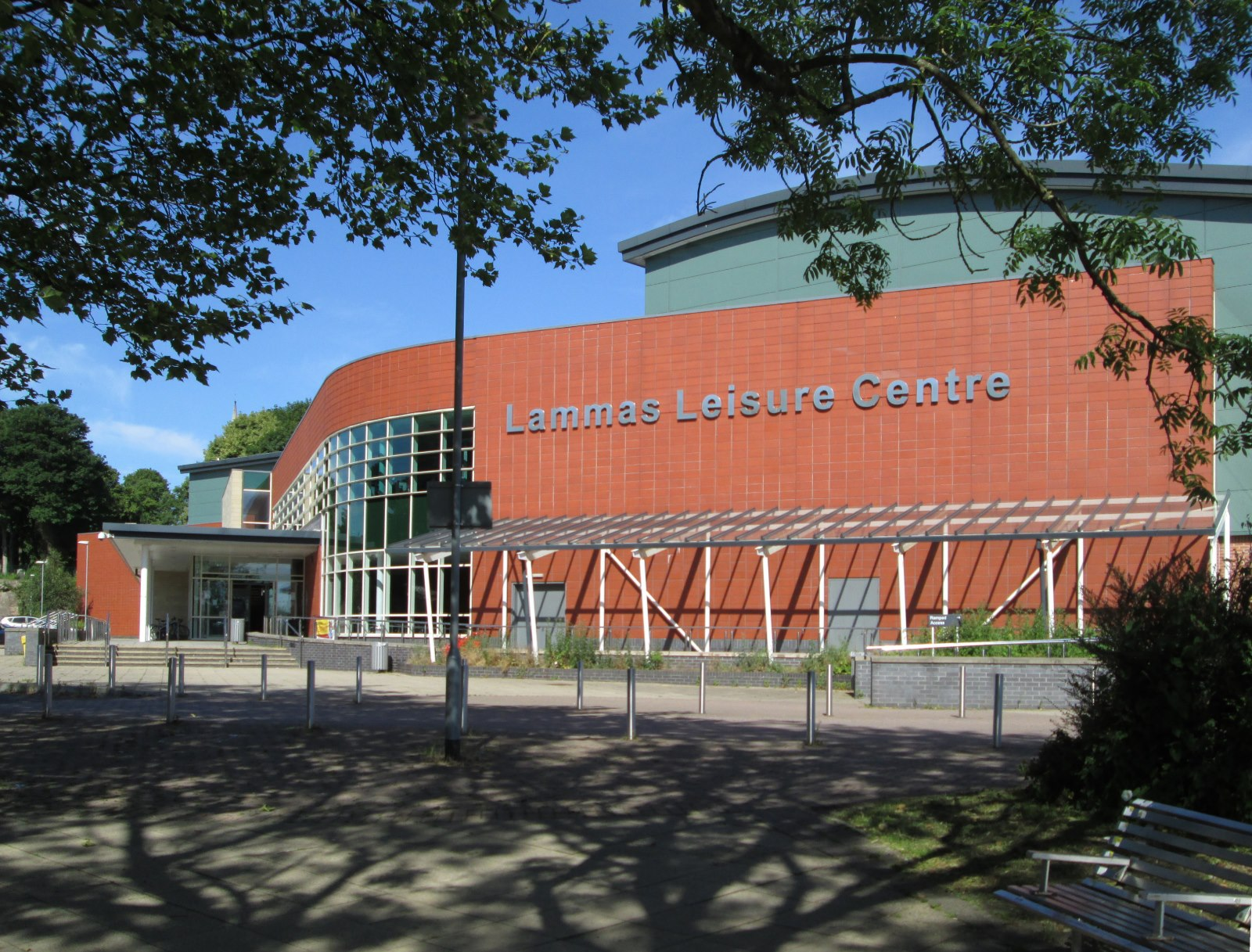
Lammas Leisure Centre

Sutton-in-Ashfield has had a public swimming pool since 1926. The first one was built on Brook Street and was paid for by the local Miners Welfare fund. Initially, the pool was only open during the summer months, with the pool being covered and used as a dancehall in the winter. In 1969, a new 25m-long pool (with high diving board and 4m deep end) was opened next door to the original pool (which was from then on used as a teaching pool). In the 1970s, as part of the construction of the Sutton Centre School, a public ice rink was provided. In 2008, the Brook Street swimming pools and the Sutton Centre ice rink were closed and the Lammas Leisure Centre on Lammas Road opened. The formal opening was performed by Dame Kelly Holmes. The Lammas Leisure Centre has 2 swimming pools (main and teaching), an ice rink (home to Sutton Sting Ice Hockey Academy), 2 squash courts (home to Sutton Squash Club), a gym, a multi-purpose sports hall and an indoor bowling green.

==== Sports clubs ====
There is a local athletics club, the Sutton-in-Ashfield Harriers & Athletics Club, and swimming club associated with both local schools and the Lammas Leisure Centre itself. There is also the Coxmoor Golf Club on Coxmoor Road (B6139), next to the A611. As a result of local council grant applications for sport development, Sebastian Coe opened a new athletics track for the town at the nearby Ashfield School in February 2007.

==== Sutton Town AFC ====
Sutton Town was a football club founded in 1923. Known as the Snipes, the team was a member of the Midland League from 1923 to 1927. The club was reborn in 1958 and was a member of the Midland League until 1982 when the club became a founding member of the Northern Counties East League. In 1992, the team name was changed to Ashfield United, but the team folded after the 1996–97 season. North Notts Football Club began operations in 2000 as a member of the Central Midlands League, changing its name to Sutton Town AFC for the 2001–03 season. The team finished runner up in 2002–03, winning promotion to the Northern Counties East League. In 2004-05 the club won promotion to the NCEL Premier Division. However, in 2007–08, the club resigned from the NCEL and moved down the football pyramid to the Central Midlands League. The club was promoted to the East Midlands Counties League in 2013 but in June 2014 the club resigned from the league after they were unable to come to a suitable agreement over a lease at home ground "The Fieldings" that would enable them to get promoted in the future, which was a league requirement.

==== Greyhound racing ====
A greyhound racing track was opened around the Avenue Ground situated on the Mansfield Road behind the Pot Makers Arms, a venue used by Sutton Town AFC. The first meeting took place on 14 May 1932. The racing was independent (not affiliated to the sports governing body the National Greyhound Racing Club) and was known as a flapping track, which was the nickname given to independent tracks. Racing came to an end there on 13 May 1972.

=== Kings Mill Reservoir ===
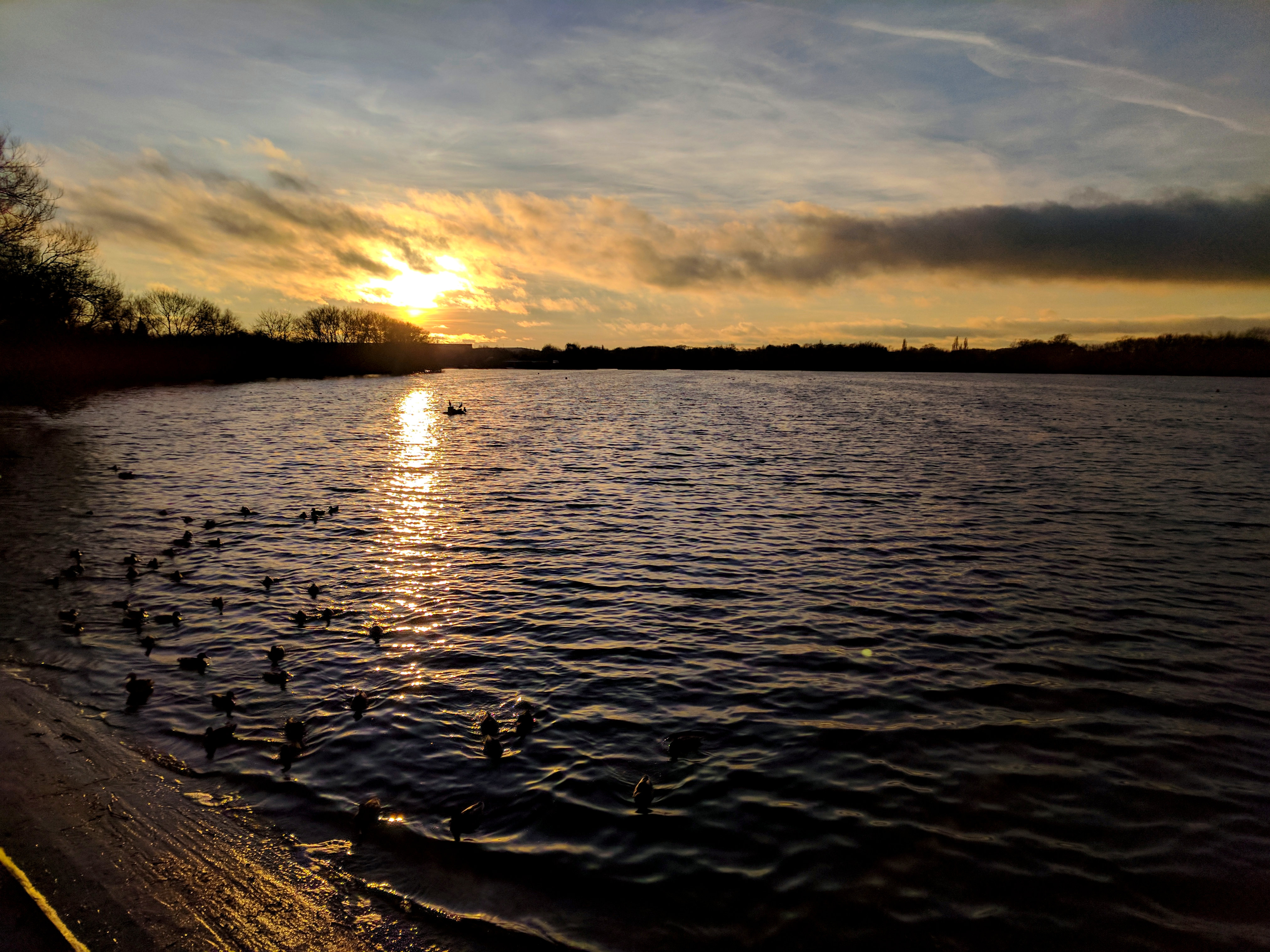
Kings Mill Reservoir at dusk

Kings Mill Reservoir lies within Sutton in Ashfield itself and not in the neighbouring town of Mansfield, it is home to the Mill Adventure Base with sailing activities. This is one of three Nottinghamshire adventure bases, with the other two at Holme Pierrepont (Lakeside) and Worksop (Sandhill), all of which are available for people aged 11–19. The sailing club has used the reservoir since 1959. Kings Mill received its name from a mill on the north-east of the reservoir, once owned by John Cockle and his wife, who gave Henry II of England a night's lodgings and breakfast during his reign.

=== Nature ===
To the west is the 250 acres (100 ha) Brierley Forest Park, built on the site of Sutton Colliery, also known as Brierley Colliery, which was named due to many of the miners coming from Brierley Hill. It is a nature reserve and opened in 1999, it holds the Green Flag Award. Kings Mill Reservoir is also a nature reserve.

== Notable people ==
- Pascal Broadley, cricketer
- Jake Buxton, footballer for Mansfield Town, Burton Albion and Derby County
- Elizabeth Hooton, one of the earliest preachers of the Quakers, who lived in Skegby where she met George Fox the founder.
- Henry Herbert, 3rd Earl of Carnarvon of Highclere Castle (1800–1849) who had a secondary residence at Teversal Manor in the village of Teversal. As did his son Henry Herbert, 4th Earl of Carnarvon(1831–1890) who had a central role in the creation of Canada, Lord Lieutenant of Ireland. George Herbert, 5th Earl of Carnarvon then owned the estate. The 5th Earl funded the excavations of Tutankhamun's tomb in 1922.
- Kris Commons, footballer for Stoke City, Nottingham Forest, Derby County and Celtic. He was educated in Sutton in Ashfield.
- Andrew Lewis, composer
- Neil Hardwick British/Finnish Theatre Director and Writer, from Teversal
- Chris Gascoyne, Coronation Street actor who plays Peter Barlow.
- Lee Anderson, current MP for Ashfield
- Sam Walker (b.1995), table tennis player
- Jack Butterworth, Baron Butterworth former Lawyer and the first Vice Chancellor of the University of Warwick.
- Leonard Rotherham was a British metallurgist and vice chancellor of the University of Bath.
- Jeremiah Brandreth, last person to be publicly beheaded with an axe in the United Kingdom in 1817. He was part of the Pentrich rising and lived in the town.
- Trevor Ashmore, famous for his museum quality forgeries of Anglo-Saxon and early English coinage
- Michael Willetts, one of the first British soldiers to be killed during The Troubles in Northern Ireland
- James Walker, known as Jimmy Walker football goalkeeper previously of Walsall and West Ham.
- Alex Baptiste, football defender for Mansfield Town, Blackpool F.C. and Bolton Wanderers.
- Horace Burrows, footballer for Sheffield Wednesday and England
- Wayne Bullimore, footballer for Barnsley.
- Lisa McKenzie, sociologist based at Durham University
- Johnny Briggs (1862–1902) born in Lord Street, the only man to have scored a 100 and taken a hat-trick in the history of Ashes cricket
- Parosha Chandran, first professor of modern slavery law at King's College London and human rights barrister.

== See also ==
- Listed buildings in Sutton-in-Ashfield
