= George Baines (architect) =

British architect

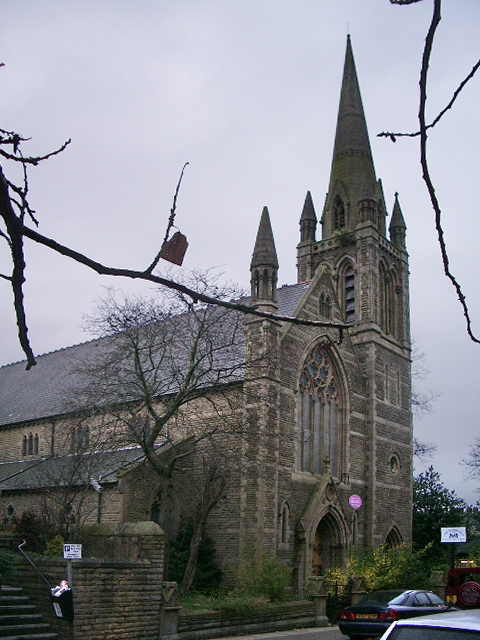
Cannon Street Baptist Church, Accrington 1874

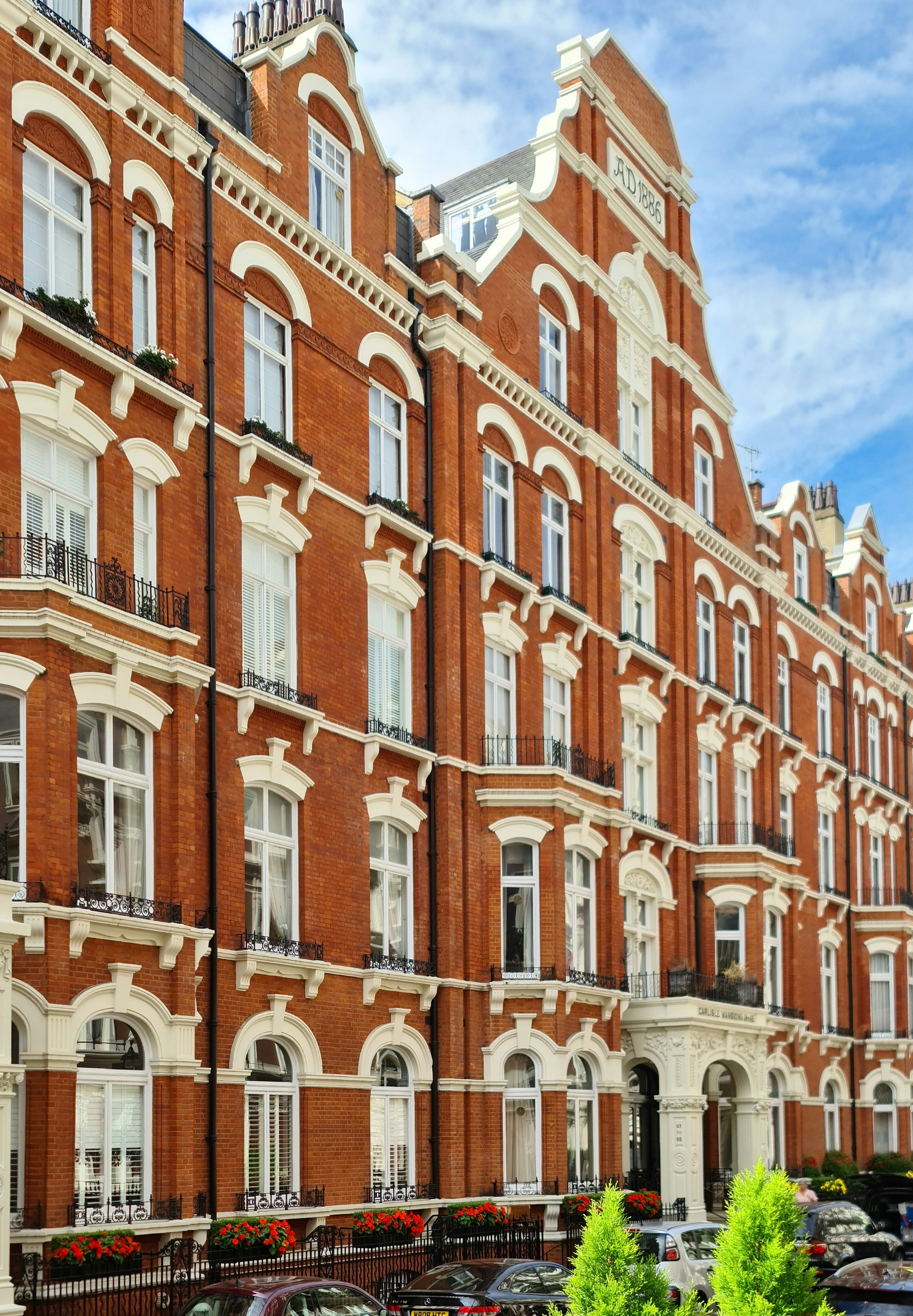
Carlisle Mansions, London 1885-89

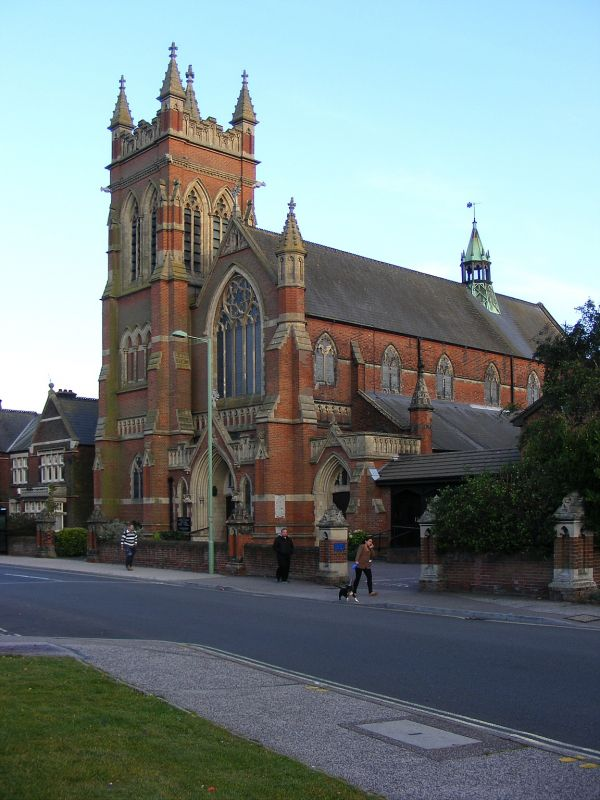
Our Lady Star of the Sea, Lowestoft 1902-10

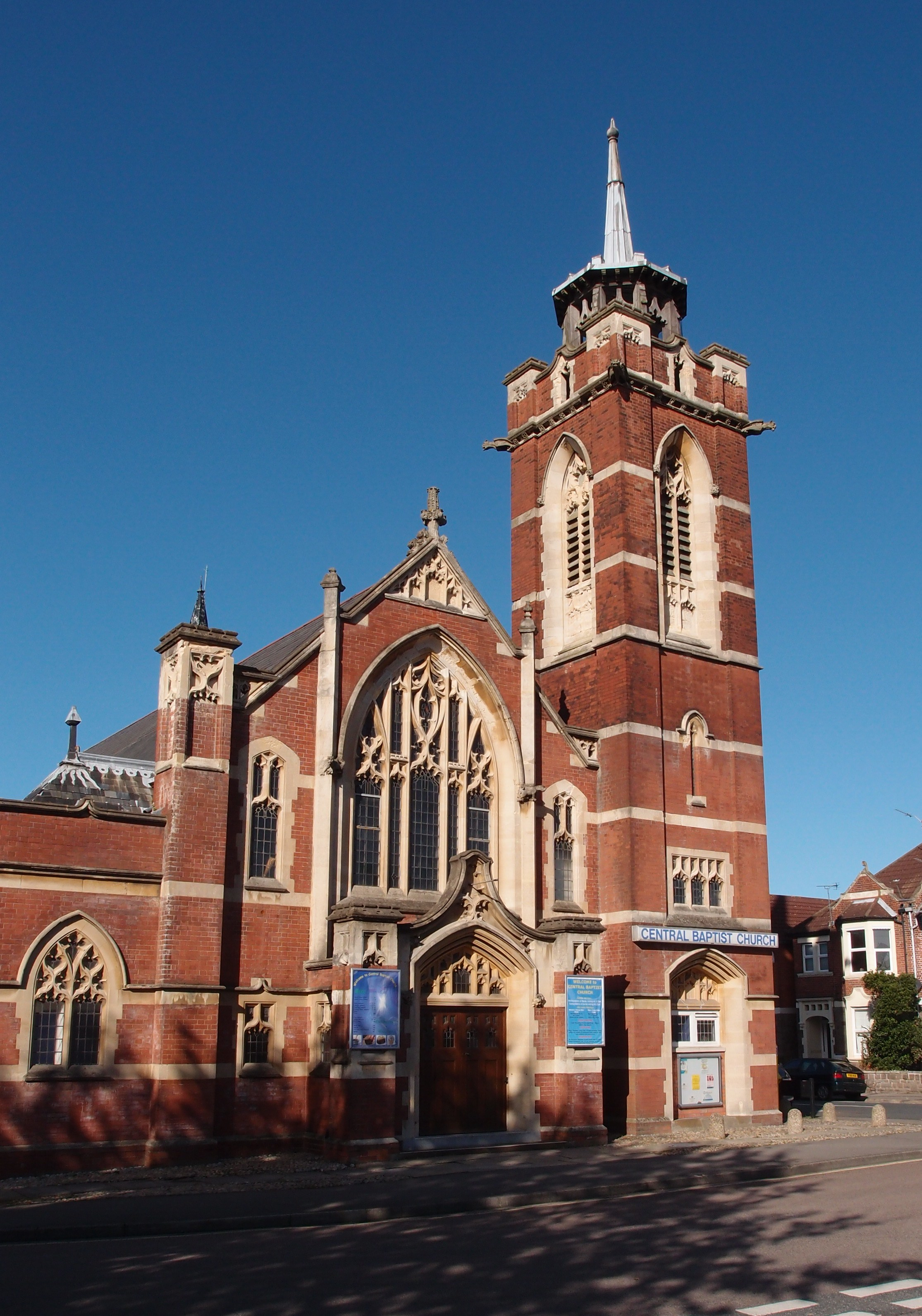
Central Baptist Church, Southampton 1910

George Baines FRIBA (1851 - 17 March 1934) was an architect based first in Accrington, Lancashire and then London who is known for designing many non-conformist chapels and churches.

== Life and career ==
He was born in 1851 in Kimbolton, Huntingdon, the son of Joseph Baines (1825-1854), draper, and Eleanor Constin (1819-1915).

He married Alice Maria Palmer, daughter of the late N.B. Palmer of Great Yarmouth on 25 November 1875 in The Congregational Church, Stratford, London and they had the following children:

- Florence Alice Baines (b. 1877)
- Reginald Palmer Baines (1879 - 1960)
- Edith Ellen Baines (b.1882)
- Mildred Emma Baines (b. 1891)

He was articled to Jonathan Tobbs Bottle and Henry Olley in Great Yarmouth from 1867 to 1870 and then assistant to William Gilbee Habershorn and Alfred Robert Pite. He established an independent practice in Post Office Chambers, Accrington, Lancashire in 1871, but moved to London in 1884. He was appointed a Fellow of the Royal Institute of British Architects in 1892.

He entered into a partnership with his son Reginald Palmer Baines in 1901 as G & R P Baines. He retired in 1929.

== Works ==
- Baptist Church, Cannon Street, Accrington, Lancashire 1874
- Baptist Chapel, Huncoat, Lancashire 1875
- Baptist Church Sunday School, Mount Pleasant Chapel, Burnley 1875-76
- Ebeneezer Baptist Church, Bury Road, Haslingden, Lancashire 1876-90
- Wesleyan Methodist Chapel, Scaitcliffe, Accrington 1877
- Baptist Chapel, New Lane, Oswaldtwistle, Lancashire 1877-78 (demolished)
- Mount Pleasant Baptist Chapel, Burnley 1879 (alterations and renovations)
- Baptist Chapel, Anglesea Street, Clayton-le-Moors 1881-82
- Pair of Semi Detached Houses, Clayton-le-Moors, Accrington, Lancashire 1883
- Baptist Church, Great Clowes Street, Lower Broughton, Salford 1883
- Carey Baptist School, Pole Street, Preston, Lancashire 1883
- Trinity Baptist Church and School, Keighley Road, Colne, Lancashire 1883
- Working Lads’ Institute, Whitechapel Road, London 1885
- Baptist Church, Cann Hall Road, Leyton, London 1886-87
- Home of Industry, Bethnal Green Road, Hackney, London 1887
- Congregational Chapel, Oakleigh Park, Whetstone, London 1887-88
- Baptist Church, Main Road, Sidcup, London 1887-88
- Congregational Church, Station Road, Sidcup, London 1888
- Carlisle Mansions, Carlisle Place, Westminster, London 1885-89
- Ceylon Baptist School, Wellington Street, Luton 1888-89
- Christian Mission, Lower Thames Street, Billingsgate, London 1889
- Congregational Church, Hurst Road, Bexley, London 1890
- Clarendon Baptist Church, Councillor Street, Camberwell, London 1889-91
- Baptist Church, Forest Hill Road, Honor Oak, London 1891-92
- Congregational Church, Wood Street, Barnet, London 1892
- Liberal Club, Gordon Road, Lowestoft 1892
- Baptist Church, Florence Road, Preston, Brighton 1894
- Baptist Church, Ilderton Road, Bermondsey, London 1894-95
- Baptist Schools, Vicarage Road, Leyton, London 1894-95
- Baptist Church, Woolwich Road, East Greenwich, London 1895-97
- Richmond Street Mission, East Street, Walworth, London 1896-97
- Baptist Chapel, Ferme Park Hornsey, London 1898
- Gymnasium, Durham Grammar School 1898-99
- Baptist Church, Grove Estate, London Road, Lowestoft 1898-99
- Baptist Church and School, Station Road, Histon, Cambridgeshire 1899-1900 (school 1902)
- Methodist Church, Fentiman Road, South Lambeth, London 1900-01
- Baptist Church, Brighton Road, Newhaven, Sussex 1901
- Trinity Methodist, Argyll Road, Southend on Sea, Essex 1901
- Baptist Church, Dukes Avenue, Muswell Hill, London 1901-02
- Baptist Church, Lewin Road, Streatham, London 1901-02
- Baptist Church (old), Creighton Avenue, East Finchley, London 1902
- Our Lady Star of the See Roman Catholic Church, Gordon Road, Lowestoft 1900-02
- West Streatham Baptist Church 1902-03
- South Cliff Congregational Church, Pakefield Road, Lowestoft 1902-03
- Presbyterian Church, Broadway, Muswell Hill, London 1902-03
- Baptist Church, Mitcham Lane, West Streatham, London 1902-03
- Baptist Church, Gloucester Place, Brighton Sussex 1903
- Bury Park Congregational Church, Waldeck Road, Luton 1903
- Methodist Church, Winchester Road, Highams Park, London 1903
- Baptist Church, St Andrew Street, Cambridge 1903
- Congregational Church, High Road, Little Ilford, London 1903-04
- United Methodist Church, Seven Kings Road, Seven Kings, London 1904
- Baptist Church, Chapel Road, Breachwood Green, Hertfordshire 1904-05
- Baptist Church, Miles Street, Middlesbrough 1905
- Free Methodist Church, Fife Street, Nuneaton 1905
- Baptist Church, Regent Place, Rugby 1905
- Mill Road Baptist Church, Mill Road, Wellingborough, Northamptonshire 1905
- Dovedale Baptist Church, Dovedale Road, Watertree, Liverpool 1904-06
- Trafalgar Street Baptist Church, Beverley Road, Hull 1904-06
- Congregational Church, High Pavement, Sutton in Ashfield, Nottinghamshire 1905-06
- Primitive Methodist Church, Derby Road, Long Eaton 1906
- Hertford Baptist Church, Cowbridge 1906
- Congregational Church, Cobden Road, South Norwood, London 1906-07
- Wesleyan Methodist Church, Pirton, Hertfordshire 1906-07
- Banner Cross Methodist Church, Eccleshall Road, Sheffield 1907 (now the church hall)
- Braemar Avenue Baptist Church, Braemar Avenue, Wood Green, London 1907
- Congregational Church, Meads Lane, Seven Kings, London 1907
- Baptist Church, High Road, Ilford, London 1904-08
- Baptist Church, Coventry Road, Market Harborough 1907-08
- Congregational Mission Church, Martins Road, Shortlands, London 1908
- Baptist Church, Leavesden Road North, Watford, Hertfordshire 1909
- Primitive Methodist Church, Albion Terrace, Saltburn by Sea 1905-10
- Beulah Baptist Church, Beulah Crescent, Thornton Heath, London 1909-10
- Christ Church Congregational Church, Friern Barnet Road, Friern Barnet, London 1909-10
- Methodist Church, Cuckfield Road, Hurstpierpont, Sussex 1909-10
- Methodist Church, Bryant Street, Stratford, London 1909-10
- Central Baptist Church, Devonshire Road, Southampton 1910
- Primitive Methodist Church School, Ormonde Street, Ashton under Lyne, Lancashire 1910
- Primitive Methodist Church, St Neots Road, Sandy, Bedfordshire 1910
- Baptist Church, Crosby Road North, Waterloo, Lancashire 1910-11
- Wesleyan Methodist Church, Biggleswade 1912
- Russell Baptist Church, Denmark Street, Bedford 1912
- Baptist Church, Cardigan Road, Winton, Bournemouth 1912
- Congregational Church, Doncaster Road, Scunthorpe, Lincolnshire 1912
- Wesleyan Methodist Church, Ampthill Road, Shefford, Bedfordshire 1912
- United Methodist Church, Nottingham Road, Mansfield, Nottinghamshire 1913
- Congregational Church, Fox Lane, Southgate, London 1914
- Baptist Church, Burford Street, Hoddesdon, Hertfordshire 1910-14
- Baptist Church, London Road, Newcastle under Lyme 1914
- Methodist Church, Norton Way, Letchworth, Hertfordshire 1914
- United Methodist Church, Chantrey Road, Woodseats, Sheffield 1915
- Congregational Church, South Street, Haywards Heath, Sussex 1912-15
- St Andrew's Methodist Church, Beckett Road, Wheatley, Doncaster 1915-16
- Primitive Methodist Church, Elim Dew's Road, Salisbury 1916-17
- Foleshill Baptist Church, Broad Street, Coventry 1924
- Primitive Methodist Church, Abington, Northamptonshire 1924
- Methodist Church, Towcester Road, Northampton 1923-24
- Methodist Church, Park Avenue, Northampton 1924-25
- Ravensdale Methodist Church, Ravensdale Road, Stamford Hill, London 1925
- Blackhill Baptist Church, Durham Road, Consett, County Durham 1914-25
- Crowstone Congregational Church, Kings Road, Southend on Sea, Essex 1924-26
- Methodist Church, Station Road, North Chingford, London 1927
- Methodist Church, The Drive, Redbridge, London 1927-28
- Congregational Church, Blandford Road, Pool, Dorset 1928
- Congregational Church, Sefton Road, Heysham, Lancashire 1928-29
- Stoke Congregational Church, Harefield Road, Coventry 1929
- Congregational Church, Longfeet Road, Poole, Dorset 1925-30
- Baptist Church (new), Creighton Avenue, East Finchley, London 1930
