= Central Baptist Church, Southampton =

Southampton Central Baptist Church
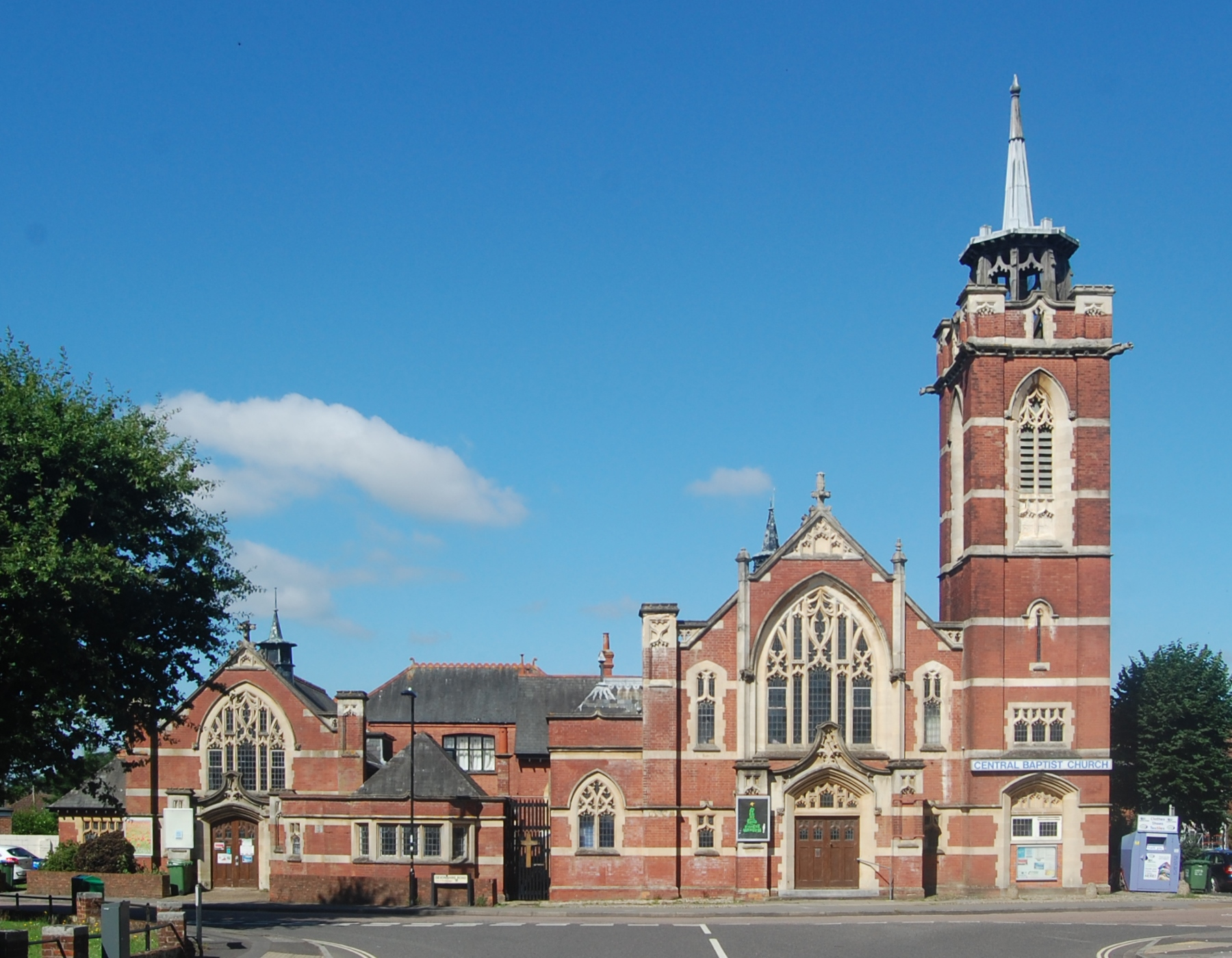
- Southampton Central Baptist Church in 2021

- Shown within Southampton
- 50.9122°N 1.4093°W
- Location: The Polygon, Southampton
- Denomination: Baptist
- Website: http://www.southamptoncbc.org.uk

Architecture
- Architect: George Baines

Southampton Central Baptist Church is a Baptist church located in the Polygon area of Southampton, Hampshire. The building in which the church meets is a Grade II listed building.
