= Andrew Lewis (composer) =

British composer

Andrew Lewis (born in Sutton-in-Ashfield, Nottinghamshire on 14 May 1963) is a British composer known mainly for his acousmatic music, that is, electroacoustic music heard only over loudspeakers, though he also composes some chamber and orchestral music.

== Education ==
He studied music at the University of Birmingham in England, first as an undergraduate (1981–84), then as a postgraduate studying composition with Jonty Harrison. It was during this time that he became one of the original members of BEAST, performing electroacoustic music throughout the United Kingdom under Harrison's direction. After gaining a PhD in 1992 he worked briefly in the Music department at the University of Surrey (England) (1992–93) before becoming lecturer at the Bangor University (Wales). He is currently a Professor of music there, as well as directing the work of the Electroacoustic Music Studios and Electroacoustic WALES, which performs electroacoustic and acousmatic music.

== Music ==
Much of his acousmatic music displays an interest in the abstraction of unseen and unrecognisable sounds, an approach particularly strongly evident in earlier works such as Arrivals (1987) and Time and Fire (1991). However, with the composition of Scherzo (1992) a parallel concern with the anecdotal and pictorial possibilities of recognisable sounds began to emerge, and much of his subsequent work plays on the tensions between these two approaches. Since moving to Wales, much of the evocation of image in his music relates to the landscape of the area in which he lives and works. Ascent (1994) evokes the wildness of the mountain landscape of Snowdonia, which was awarded a ‘Euphonie d’Or’ by the Bourges electroacoustic music competition, as one of the most notable former prizewinning works between 1975 and 2005. The cycle of works Four Anglesey Beaches (Penmon Point; Cable Bay; Benllech Shells; Llanddwyn Skies) (1999-2003) takes as its inspiration the seascapes and coastal locations of the area. 'Skyline' (2016) uses the sound of a blackbird's song, while 'Two Lakes' (2022) and 'Three Storms' (2023) use sonified climate change data.

Lewis's more recent work includes more music for orchestras and ensembles, though an acousmatic concern with the materiality of sound remains: Eclipse (orchestra, 2004) was premiered under Elgar Howarth, while in the same year Tempo Reale (string quartet, 2004) was chosen by Sir Peter Maxwell Davies for a performance in London's Wigmore Hall. Fern Hill (orchestra and electronics, 2014) combines the orchestra with recordings of Dylan Thomas reciting his poem of the same name, and Lebenslieder (orchestra and electronics, 2017) takes a similar approach using recordings of interviews with people with dementia. In Memory (orchestra and electronics, 2021) was a BBC Radio 3 commission, and also explores dementia, using interviews with unpaid family carers.

Some writings on the analysis of electroacoustic music exist, in particular ‘Francis Dhomont’s Novars’ in Journal of New Music Research, and ‘Spectromorphology, motion and meta-motion in Denis Smalley’s Vortex’ in Polychrome Portrait No. 15.

== Works ==
- The Song of Five Anger, acousmatic (1982)
- Empire canons, two trumpets (1982)
- Logos, acousmatic (1983)
- Quad, four clarinets (1983)
- Sonnerie aux morts, acousmatic (1984)
- La Corona, ensemble (1984)
- Adagio, acousmatic (1985)
- Rond'eau, acousmatic (1985)
- FM, music theatre for solo guitarist (1985)
- Principles of Flight, shakuhachi and electroacoustic sounds (1986, rev. 1991)
- MARanaTHA, four amplified voices and live electronics (1986)
- Storm-song, piano and electroacoustic sounds (1987)
- Arrivals, acousmatic (1987)
- ...a cord of three strands..., ensemble, computer and live electronics (1988)
- Time and Fire, acousmatic (1990)
- Changes, flute, viola and harp (1990)
- Tracking, piano trio (1990)
- int/EXT, harpsichord and electroacoustic sounds (1991)
- PulseRates (with BEAST), acousmatic (1991)
- Scherzo, acousmatic (1992, revised 1993)
- Ascent, acousmatic (1994, revised 1997)
- Eclipse, orchestra (1996, rev. 2004)
- môr(G)wyn, acousmatic (1996)
- Cân, acousmatic (1997)
- Nunc dimittis, boys' choir and organ (1998)
- Cable Bay, acousmatic (1999)
- CHROMA - Thema, flute (alto flute), oboe, horn, trombone, viola, harp (1999)
- Shadow Play, small orchestra (1999)
- Tempo Reale, string quartet (1999, rev. 2004)
- Dawns, harp and electroacoustic sounds (2000)
- Jeux d'ombres, flute, oboe, clarinet, bassoon and piano (2000)
- double (fragment), 2fl, 2ob, 2clt (2bcl), hn, 2pno, 2vln, vla, vlc, elec bs (2001)
- double (serenâd), 2 ob, 2 cl, 2 basset hn, 2 bsn, 4 hn, cb (2002)
- Penmon Point, acousmatic (2003)
- Llanddwyn Skies, acousmatic (2003)
- Benllech Shells, acousmatic (2003)
- 'Budo' Variations, trumpet, percussion and computer (2006)
- Danses acousmatiques, acousmatic (2007)
- Schattenklavier, piano and computer (2009)
- X-over, piano or toy piano (2009)
- Number Nine Dream, orchestra (2010)
- Vox Populi, interactive installation (2011)
- Vox Dei, 8 amplified voices and live processing (2011)
- Dark Glass, acousmatic (2011)
- Tantana, acousmatic (2011)
- Air, bassoon and computer (2012)
- Lexicon, acousmatic with video (2012)
- Il re lunaire, fl, cl, vl, vc, vib, pno (2013)
- Fern Hill, orchestra and electronics (2014)
- Straatmuziek, flute (alto fl), clarinet (bass cl), piano (2016)
- Skyline, acousmatic (2016)
- Lebenslieder, orchestra or chamber orchestra and electronics (2017)
- Étude aux objets, alto fl (picc), cl, bn, sop tbn (or tp), perc, hp, 2 vln, vla, vlc, cb (2018)
- Earthline, solo bass & alto flutes and electronics (2019)
- Canzon in Double Echo, large ensemble and electronics (2020)
- In Memory, orchestra and electronics (2021)
- Fantazia Upon One Note, solo violin and electronics (2022)
- Cori Spezzati, acousmatic (2022)
- Three Storms, acousmatic (2022)
- Two Lakes, acousmatic (2023)
