= Cannon Street Baptist Church, Accrington =

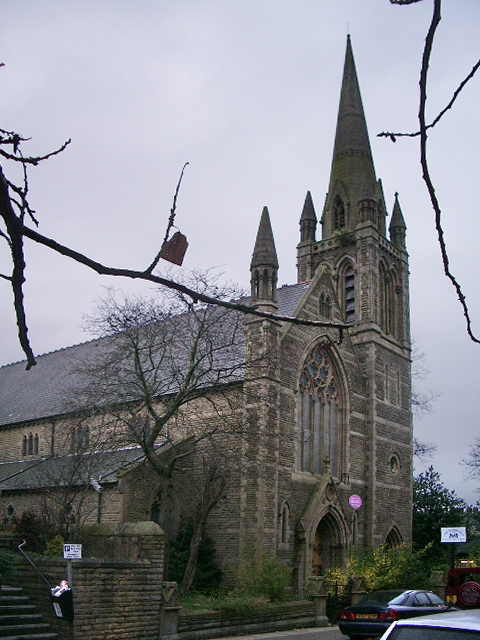
- Cannon Street Baptist Church, Accrington

- Location within Lancashire
- 53°45′8″N 2°22′2″W
- OS grid reference: SD 75883 28515
- Location: Accrington, Lancashire
- Country: England
- Denomination: Baptist

Architecture
- Heritage designation: Grade II listed
- Architect: George Baines
- Groundbreaking: Whit Monday 1872
- Completed: 19 March 1874
- Construction cost: £12,000 (equivalent to £1,173,200 in 2025)

Specifications
- Capacity: 1,000 persons

Cannon Street Baptist Church, Accrington is a Grade II listed former Baptist church in Accrington, Lancashire.

== History ==
The congregation for which the Cannon Street Chapel was built originated in Oakenshaw about 1735 when a few members met in the house of John Ellison. In 1754 they constructed a purpose-built chapel and by 1760 they separated from the congregation at Bacup to form an independent community. A new chapel was required by 1765 and this was replaced in 1836 by a chapel on Blackburn Road. The initiative to build the chapel started in 1863 when the congregation started fundraising.

The foundation stone for the new chapel was laid on Whit Monday 1872 by James Barlow Esq. The cost of the chapel and the school was around £12,000 and it opened for worship on 19 March 1874.

== Organ ==
The church installed a 3 manual 23 stop organ in 1874 by William Hill & Son. This was enlarged to 30 stops in 1899 by Jardine and Co and subsequent enlargements brought it to 35 stops.

== See also ==
- Listed buildings in Accrington
