= Listed buildings in Accrington =

Accrington is a town in Hyndburn, Lancashire, England. It contains 43 listed buildings, which are designated by Historic England and recorded in the National Heritage List for England. Of these, two are listed at Grade II*, the middle grade, and the others are at Grade II.

Until the arrival of industry in the later part of the 18th century the area was rural, containing only small settlements. Most of the older listed buildings are, or originated as, farmhouses or farm buildings. There is one surviving industrial building, a former engineering workshop, that has been listed. Many of the other listed buildings are associated with the development of a substantial town, and with its road and rail links. The buildings associated with transport are a former coaching inn (now a public house), a road toll house, and a railway viaduct. A number of public and commercial buildings are listed, including the town hall, the public library, the former mechanics' institute, a market hall, a shopping arcade, and a former bank. The other listed buildings include large houses, some of which have been adapted for other purposes, a political club, churches, and memorials. The newest buildings to have been listed are a complex consisting of a fire station, magistrates' courts, and a police station, which were built in the 1930s.

== Key ==
| Grade | Criteria |
|---|---|
| II* | Particularly important buildings of more than special interest |
| II | Buildings of national importance and special interest |

== Buildings ==
| Name and location | Photograph | Date | Notes | Grade |
|---|---|---|---|---|
| Huncoat Hall and barn 53.76640°N 2.33476°W | — | Late medieval to early 16th century | Originally a hall house, later altered and used as a house and a barn. It is in stone with a stone-slate roof, in two storeys, and has an H-shaped plan. The central range was possibly an open hall, with projecting gabled wings, that on the left being a barn. On the right side is a two-storey extension containing a former garderobe. Other features include a stair turret with a stone spiral staircase, and a possible chapel in the upper storey. | II |
| Higher Antley Hall and Cottage; 53.74495°N 2.37361°W | — | Early 17th century | This originated as a farmhouse, and it was altered in 1927 to make two dwellings. It is in pebbledashed stone, and has stone-slate roofs. The building has two storeys, a three-bay front, and a short two-storey outshut at the rear. On the front is a two-storey gabled porch with a Tudor arched doorway. Most of the windows have been altered, but some mullioned windows remain. | II |
| High Riley Cottages; 53.75092°N 2.33629°W | — | 1628 | Originally a farmhouse, extended in the 19th century, and later divided into three dwellings. It is in stone with stone-slate roofs, and the original building has an L-shaped plan with three bays and a wing to the third bay. There is a porch with a datestone above, and the windows are mullioned. | II |
| Hill House Farmhouse; 53.77011°N 2.33924°W | — | 17th century | A former farmhouse in stone with a stone-slate roof, it has two storeys and three-bays with a two-storey gabled rear extension. On the front is a two-storey gabled porch. The windows are mullioned. | II |
| Slate Pits Farmhouse; 53.75732°N 2.33614°W | — | 17th century | The farmhouse was extended in the 18th century. It is in stone with a stone-slate roof, and has two storeys and three bays. There is an outshut at the rear, and the third bay has been extended forward to make a cottage. On the front is a lean-to porch that has a moulded Tudor arched doorcase. The windows are mullioned. | II |
| Higher Hey Farmhouse and Cottage; 53.74636°N 2.32806°W | — | 1688 | A farmhouse that was extended and later divided into two dwellings. It is in rendered stone with exposed quoins and a stone-slate roof. The building has a cruciform plan, with a two-bay main range, later extended with a bay added to the left. On the front is a two-storey gabled porch with a Tudor arched doorway and a datestone, and at the rear is a gabled stair turret. Most of the windows have been altered, but some mullions remain. | II |
| Sundial; 53.75191°N 2.36562°W | | 1712 | The sundial is in the churchyard of St James' Church. It is in sandstone and consists of a square panelled pillar about 1.5 metres (4 ft 11 in) high standing on two octagonal steps. On top of the sundial is a moulded cap with an octagonal plate and a triangular gnomon. | II |
| Village stocks 53.76968°N 2.33916°W | | 1712 | The stocks are in Huncoat and in an enclosure bounded by railings. The stocks consist of two square stone uprights, and two wooden cross bars with spaces for two pairs of legs. | II |
| Friar Hill Farmhouse; 53.72983°N 2.35492°W | — | 1744 | The former farmhouse was later extended by the addition of a loomshop to the right. The building is in sandstone with a stone-slate roof. Both parts are in two storeys, the house having a symmetrical two-bay front with a gabled single-storey porch. The loomshop has a four-light mullioned window on the ground floor and two square windows above. | II |
| St James' Church; 53.75195°N 2.36534°W | | 1772–63 | The church was altered and enlarged on a number of occasions during the 19th century. It is built in sandstone with a slate roof, and has a simple rectangular plan with the nave embracing a west tower. The tower has four stages, rusticated quoins, a round-headed west door and window, and an embattled parapet. The nave is in two storeys and has two tiers of round-headed windows. The east window contains Gothic tracery. Inside there are galleries on three sides. | II |
| Barns at rear of former Red Lion Inn; 53.75092°N 2.36144°W | — | Late 18th century | The barns, which incorporate an earlier basement shippon, are in sandstone with stone roofs. In the north front are a cart opening with a depressed arch, and former shippon openings converted into windows at the ends, and between them are windows with stone lintels and sills. | II |
| Former Red Lion Inn and 106 Abbey Street; 53.75078°N 2.36115°W | | c. 1800 | This originated as the Red Lion Inn, the first coaching inn in the town, it was extended in 1822, and has since been used for other purposes. It is in sandstone with a slate roof, in two storeys, with a symmetrical three-bay front, and a wing at the rear of the left bay. There are round-headed doorways in the centre of the front, and on the right side. There is also a two-storey bay window on the right side. Most of the windows are sashes. | II |
| High Brake Hall; 53.77562°N 2.34352°W | | c. 1800 | A house in Georgian style. later used for other purposes. It is built in stone with a hipped slate roof, with two storeys and a symmetrical five-bay front. In the centre of the front is a doorway with a fanlight and a Doric surround. At the top of the house is a moulded cornice and a parapet. The windows are sashes. | II |
| Oak Hill Park Mansion; 53.74692°N 2.35715°W | | 1815 | A large house in Classical style, built in stone with a hipped slate roof, it has two storeys and a symmetrical five-bay front. The central three bays project slightly forward, they are pedimented with a dentilled cornice, and contain a Doric porch with fluted columns, a frieze, and a segmental fanlight. On the right side is another pillared porch. The windows are sashes. | II |
| 100 and 102 Blackburn Road; 53.75379°N 2.36896°W | — | Early 19th century (probable) | A house later altered for other purposes, in ashlar stone with a slate roof. It has a front of five bays, with two storeys at the front, and three at the back, where there is a three-storey extension. The central three bays are pedimented, the ground floor windows have been changed, and the windows above are sashes. | II |
| Old Toll House; 53.74545°N 2.35568°W | | Early 19th century | The former toll house is in sandstone with a slate roof. It is in Tudor style, with two storeys and four bays, the gable facing the road. On the south side is a gabled porch. Most of the windows are rectangular with hood moulds, and there is an arched window in the upper floor. | II |
| Warner Arms public house 53.75175°N 2.36436°W | | c. 1830 | A sandstone public house with a slate roof, it has two storeys and a symmetrical five-bay front. The second and fourth bays contain wide segmental bay windows, between which is a narrow bay that has a round-headed doorway with imposts and a keystone. The windows are sashes. | II |
| New High Riley Farmhouse; 53.75151°N 2.33858°W | | 1834 | A farmhouse with attached shippon, barn, and tower, the latter built to be an eye-catcher. The buildings are in sandstone with stone-slate roofs, and have a U-shaped plan. The tower has two stages, two arched openings, windows, and an embattled parapet. | II |
| 9 and 11 Black Abbey Street; 53.75098°N 2.36193°W | — | 1839–44 | A house and a pair of back-to-back cottages and a former cellar dwelling on a corner site, they are in buff sandstone with slate roofs. On the north front are two storeys, and four bays, and the south front has 2½ storeys and an outshut. At the rear is a garden wall with blocked openings. | II |
| Railway viaduct 53.75579°N 2.36671°W | | 1847 | The viaduct was built for the East Lancashire Railway and was restored in 1866–67. It is built in brick on stone plinths, and is faced with gritstone. The viaduct takes a curved line and has 19 (originally 21) semicircular arches with spans of 40 feet (12 m) at a height of 60 feet (18 m). At the south end a bridge carries the line over Blackburn Road on a segmental arch, and there is a similar bridge at the north end over the Whalley Road. | II |
| Former Christ Church School; 53.74757°N 2.36028°W | | Mid-19th century | The former school is in stone with a slate roof, and is in Early English style. It has a single storey, and is in a T-shaped plan, with a symmetrical six-bay front facing the church. On this front is a gabled double porch, and at the rear is a lower single-storey wing. The windows are lancets. | II |
| Town Hall; 53.75314°N 2.36533°W | | 1857–58 | The building was designed by James Green, and was originally the Peel Institute, becoming the town hall in 1865. It is built in stone and has a hipped slate roof. There are two storeys, and fronts of seven and three bays. In the centre is a porte-cochère with large arches, above which is a portico of six Corinthian columns, behind which is a Venetian window. The ground floor windows are round-headed with rusticated surrounds and keystones, and the upper floor windows have segmental heads, balustrades and segmental pediments. | II* |
| 21 Cannon Street; 53.75216°N 2.36810°W | — | c. 1860 | A house in Classical style, built in stone with a hipped slate roof. There are two storeys and a symmetrical three-bay front. The ground floor is rusticated, and at the top of the house is a moulded cornice on consoles. The central doorway has a fanlight and a recessed architrave, and the windows are sashes. | II |
| Monument to Adam Westwell; 53.75219°N 2.36607°W | — | 1860 | The monument was erected by members of the Accrington Brass Band in the churchyard of St James' Church to the memory of one of their musicians who played the ophicleide. It is in stone and consists of a Gothic pedestal on which is a draped musical instrument. The monument has a square base, a moulded plinth, diagonal buttresses, a chamfered cornice, and a pierced parapet with crocketed corner pinnacles. | II |
| Church of St John the Evangelist; 53.75763°N 2.36072°W | | 1864–70 | Designed by H. Macauley in Early English style, the church is in sandstone with slate roofs decorated with bands of green slate. It consists of a nave, a west porch, a south aisle, transepts, a chancel, and a southeast steeple. The steeple has a three stage tower, corner pinnacles on short shafts with foliated caps, and an octagonal spire. Inside the church is a south arcade having piers with crocketed capitals. | II |
| Old People's Day Centre; 53.75244°N 2.36809°W | | c. 1865 | Originally the Manchester and Liverpool Bank, it is in free Italian Gothic style, and built in stone with slate roofs. The main front has a single-storey pavilion on the left and a two-storey block to the right. Between these is a porch with a round-headed doorway above which is a shaped gable containing a coat of arms. The pavilion has five bays, the centre three bays projecting forward. The block to the right has four bays, and between the windows are medallions with badges and monograms. | II |
| Market Hall; 53.75309°N 2.36446°W | | 1868–69 | The market hall, designed by J. F. Doyle, is in ornate Renaissance style, and has a front of ashlar stone. The hall behind is built on an iron frame with a roof of slate and glass. The front has two storeys and is symmetrical with nine bays containing Corinthian pilasters. The central three bays project forward and contain a round-headed entrance, and a clock face surrounded by cherubs with cornucopias. At the top are two statues of figures holding agricultural produce. The outer bays are surmounted by balustraded parapets. Inside the hall are galleries on all sides. | II |
| Baptist Church; 53.75231°N 2.36735°W | | 1874 | The church was designed by George Baines in Early English style. It is in sandstone with a slate roof, and consists of a nave with a clerestory, aisles, transepts, a three-sided apse, and a southwest steeple. At the northeast corner is a turret with an octagonal lantern and a small spire. The steeple has a four-stage tower with a doorway, lancet windows, a pierced parapet, corner pinnacles on shafts, and a tall spire with lucarnes. | II |
| Church of St John the Baptist; 53.73476°N 2.34684°W | | 1877 | Designed by H. Varley in Early English style, the church is in stone with s slate roof. It consists of a nave with a clerestory, aisles, a chancel with a three-sided apse, and a south steeple. The steeple has a three stage tower with a south doorway, a canted stair turret, an octagonal bell stage, and an octagonal splayed spire. | II |
| Mechanics' Institution; 53.75250°N 2.36633°W | — | 1878 | The Mechanics' Institution was designed by George Baines in Classical style. It is in sandstone with a slate roof, and has two storeys and a rectangular plan with symmetrical fronts of five and three bays. In the Willow Street face is a central round-headed doorway with an Ionic pedimented architrave. The St James' Street face has in the upper floor a modified Venetian window under a pediment. The other windows are sashes. | II |
| St Peter's Church; 53.74912°N 2.37509°W | | 1886–89 | The church was designed by Henry Ross, with details mainly in Geometrical style. It is built in sandstone with slate roofs, and consists of a nave and chancel under one roof. There are aisles with porches, the nave has a clerestory, and chapels flank the chancel. On the roof at the junction of the nave and chancel is a gabled bellcote with a flèche. | II |
| Richmond Hill Street Works; 53.74947°N 2.37288°W | | 1888 | The engineering workshop, originally part of Howard & Bullough's Globe Works, is in sandstone. It has a rectangular plan with four storeys and fronts of thirteen and four bays. In the ground floor are round-headed openings with voussoirs and keystones, and the upper floors contain segmental-headed windows with keystones. | II |
| Conservative Club; 53.75204°N 2.36772°W | | 1890–91 | Designed by Morley and Woodhouse in Renaissance style, the building was in stone with a slate roof. There were three storeys, a basement and attics, and a symmetrical five-bay front. In the centre is a round-headed doorway flanked by pairs of granite columns, and with an entablature and a pediment. In the outer bays were two-storey canted bay windows with parapets and finials. At the top was a balustrade with finials, and gabled dormers. Damaged by fire in 2016 and storeys above ground floor doorway demolished. | II |
| Arcade; 53.75202°N 2.36405°W | | 1896 | A shopping arcade on a curved plan with shop fronts divided by panelled pillars. It has a glazed roof carried on slim pieced columns. At the Warner Street entrance is a block in brick with white terracotta dressings and a slate roof. Above the entrance is a gabled attic and a lunette, and at the sides are shop fronts. | II |
| Carnegie Public Library; 53.75237°N 2.36643°W | | 1906–08 | The library was designed by W. J. Newton in Renaissance style. It is in stone and has a slate roof. There are two storeys and five bays, with an entrance in the right bay. The entrance has an Ionic doorway with polished columns, and to the left are rectangular windows with keystones in the form of heads. In the upper floor are Corinthian pilasters, and round-headed windows, each with a balustrade. At the top of the building is an inscribed frieze. | II |
| Dyke Nook Lodge; 53.76328°N 2.37085°W | — | 1907 | A house designed by Walter Brierley in 17th-century style, and later used for other purposes. It is in sandstone with stone-slate roofs, is in two storeys and has an irregular plan. The main block has three bays, and there are two unequal wings. The windows are mullioned or mullioned and transomed. | II |
| Gate piers and wall, Dyke Nook Lodge; 53.76326°N 2.37115°W | — | 1907 | The gate piers consist of square sandstone pillars with decorative bands, flat copings, and large ball finials. The wall encloses the rectangular garden, it is in sandstone and has ridged coping. | II |
| Haworth Art Gallery; 53.74038°N 2.35436°W | | 1908–09 | Originating as a large house called Hollins Hall, later used as an art gallery. It was designed by W. H. Brierley in Jacobean style. It is built in sandstone with slate roofs, in 2 1/2 storeys, and has an E-shaped plan with five bays and a T-shaped service wing at the rear. In the centre is a two-storey porch with a pierced parapet, and the outer bays contain two-storey canted bay windows. Most of the windows are mullioned and transomed. | II |
| St Augustine's Church; 53.76579°N 2.34808°W | | 1908–09 | The church was designed by Grimshaw and Cunliffe in Perpendicular style with Arts and Crafts features. It is built in sandstone with slate roofs, and consists of a nave with a west baptistry, transepts, a chancel, and a northwest tower. The tower has three stages, a north porch, buttresses that rise to be topped by battlements, and a pyramidal roof. In the south transept is a wheel window. | II |
| St Andrew's Church; 53.75324°N 2.38253°W | | 1912–13 | The church was designed by Grimshaw and Cunliffe in Perpendicular style with Arts and Crafts features. It is in sandstone with a banded slate roof. The church consists of a nave, aisles, double transepts, a chancel with a chapel and a vestry, and a southeast tower. The tower has a Tudor arched doorway, a chequered band, buttresses, and a simple battlemented parapet. | II |
| War Memorial; 53.74482°N 2.35758°W | | 1920s | The war memorial is in Oak Hill Park, it was designed by Charles Reilly, and the sculpture is by Herbert Tyson Smith. The memorial is in stone and consists of a statue representing Compassion in front of a tall obelisk with fluted pilasters up to the half-way point of the obelisk. These stand on a pedimented plinth with bronze plates containing the names of the fallen. | II* |
| Fire Station; 53.74961°N 2.35995°W | | 1932–33 | The fire station was designed by Percy Thomas, and is in stone. All in a single storey, it has a taller central main block and two lower, smaller wings. The main block contains five tall garage doorways and a staff entrance. The wings each contains three smaller doorways and a window. At the rear is a six-storey tower, with pilaster strips in the top storey, and a pedimented roof. | II |
| Magistrates Courts and Police Station; 53.74988°N 2.36082°W | | 1933 | The building was designed by Percy Thomas, and is in stone with flat roofs. The magistrates' court faces Manchester Road, and is in a single storey with a central porch rising to a higher level. The porch has a giant arch with voussoirs, and contains a recessed doorway. The court is attached to the police station, which faces Spring Gardens, and has two storeys. | II |
