= Pascal Broadley =

English cricketer

Personal information
- Full name: Vaughan John Pascal Broadley
- Born: 4 April 1972 (age 54); Sutton-in-Ashfield, Nottinghamshire, England
- Batting: Right-handed
- Bowling: Right-arm medium-fast

Domestic team information
- Years: Team
- 1991: Nottinghamshire

Career statistics
Competition	First-class
Matches	1
Runs scored	6
Batting average	6.00
100s/50s	–/–
Top score	6
Balls bowled	192
Wickets	1
Bowling average	111.00
5 wickets in innings	–
10 wickets in match	–
Best bowling	1/92
Catches/stumpings	–/–
- Source: Cricinfo, 13 November 2011

Vaughan John Pascal Broadley (born 4 April 1972) is a former English cricketer. Broadley was a right-handed batsman who bowled right-arm medium-fast. He was born at Sutton-in-Ashfield, Nottinghamshire.

Broadley made a single first-class appearance for Nottinghamshire against Derbyshire in the 1991 County Championship. In this match, he batted once, scoring 6 runs before being dismissed by Dominic Cork. With the ball he took a single wicket, that of Indian batsman Mohammad Azharuddin. This wicket came at an overall cost of 111 runs from 32 overs.
