= Haworth Art Gallery =

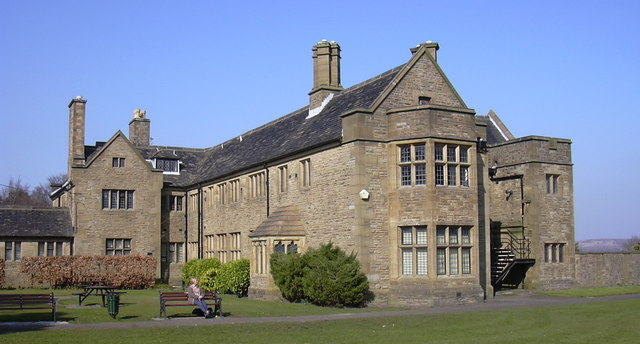

- Location within the Borough of Hyndburn
- Established: 21 September 1921
- Location: Accrington, Lancashire, England
- Coordinates: 53.7411°N 2.3550°W
- Type: Art gallery, museum and park
- Collections: Tiffany glass Oil paintings and watercolours
- Owner: Hyndburn Borough Council
- Website: www.hyndburnbc.gov.uk/hag

The Haworth Art Gallery is a public art gallery located in Accrington, Lancashire, northwest England, and is the home of the largest collection in Europe of Tiffany glass from the studio of Louis Comfort Tiffany. The museum, a Tudor-style house, was originally built in 1909 to be the home of William Haworth, a manufacturer of textiles. The house was designed by Walter Brierley (1862–1926), a York architect known as "the Yorkshire Lutyens". It was bequeathed to the people of Accrington in 1920, and stands in nine acres of parkland on the south side of Accrington Town Centre.

The Haworth's Tiffany collection is the largest outside the United States, with almost every type of Tiffany glass, including 140 pieces, including Favrile glass tiles, jewels, samples and mosaics. It was the gift of Joseph Briggs, a design apprentice who left Accrington at 17 to emigrate to the United States, where he worked for Tiffany for 40 years from about 1892. In 1933, he sent his Tiffany collection home.

The collection is on permanent public display in four themed-rooms: 'Tiffany and Interior Design', 'Tiffany and the Past', 'Tiffany and Nature', and 'The Tiffany Phenomenon'. Notable in the Gallery's Tiffany collection are over 70 vases, including a group of 'Millefiore Paperweight' and 'Intaglio' or cut-glass examples, 'flowerform' vases, vases shaped like vegetables, 'Cypriote' and 'Tel-El-Amarna' vases inspired by Roman and Egyptian examples. There are also samples relating to decorative schemes Briggs was involved with, and his 'Sulphur-crested Cockatoos' mosaic.

The museum also has a collection of mainly 19th-century oil paintings and watercolours including works by Frederic, Lord Leighton, Claude Joseph Vernet, John Frederick Herring and others.

== See also ==
- Listed buildings in Accrington
