= Wayne Bullimore =

English footballer

Personal information
- Full name: Wayne Alan Bullimore
- Date of birth: 12 September 1970 (age 56)
- Place of birth: Sutton-in-Ashfield, England
- Height: 5 ft 10 in (1.78 m)
- Position: Midfielder

Youth career
- 1988–1991: Manchester United

Senior career*
Years	Team	Apps	(Gls)
1991–1993	Barnsley	35	(1)
1993	Stockport County	0	(0)
1993–1995	Scunthorpe United	81	(11)
1995–1997	Bradford City	2	(0)
1996	→ Doncaster Rovers (loan)	4	(0)
1997–1998	Peterborough United	21	(1)
1998–1999	Scarborough	35	(1)
1999	Grantham Town	8	(0)
1999–2003	Barrow	112	(13)
	Wakefield & Emley	6	(1)
	Belper Town	6	(1)
	Stocksbridge Park Steels	?	(?)
	Stalybridge Celtic	3	(0)
	Bradford Park Avenue	4	(0)
2004–2006	Stocksbridge Park Steels	?	(?)
- * Club domestic league appearances and goals

Wayne Bullimore (born 12 September 1970 in Sutton-in-Ashfield, England) is an English former footballer who played midfield for seven clubs.

== Playing career ==
Bullimore started as a trainee at Manchester United but was released without playing a game. He signed on a free transfer for Barnsley where he made his professional start. He also signed for Stockport County, Scunthorpe United, Bradford City, Peterborough United and Scarborough. He also had a loan spell at Doncaster Rovers. He works for former club Barnsley in their Community Sports and Education Trust. He likes Barnsley as a town, said so in an interview once

== Honours ==
Individual

- PFA Team of the Year: 1994–95 Third Division
