= Accrington =

Town in Lancashire, England

Coordinates: 53.75337°N 2.36384°W

Accrington: Accy
- Town
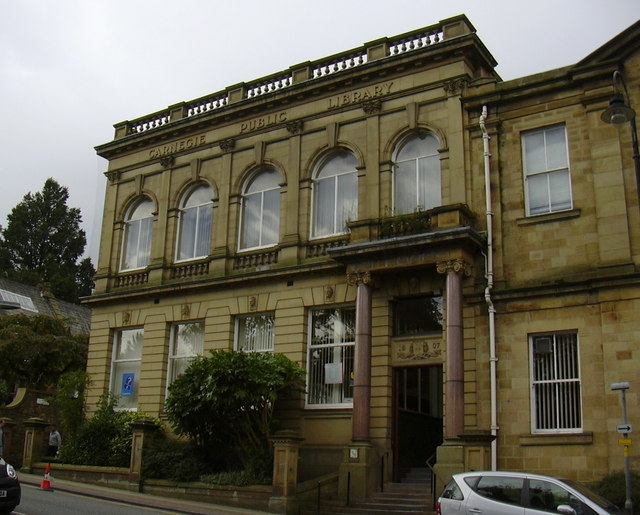
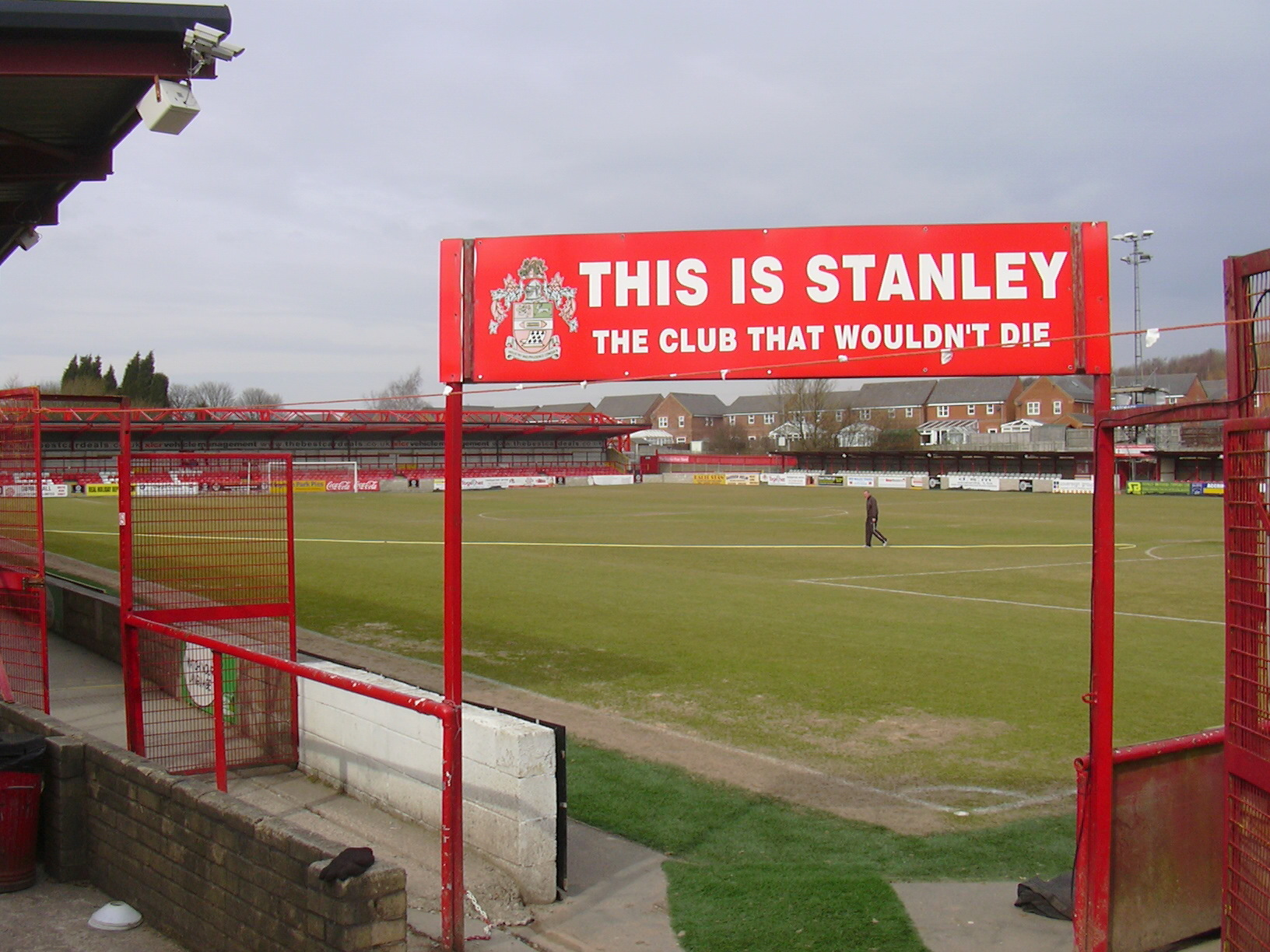
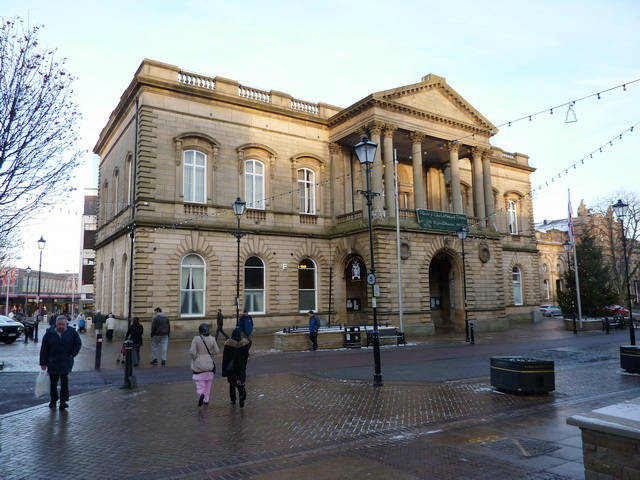
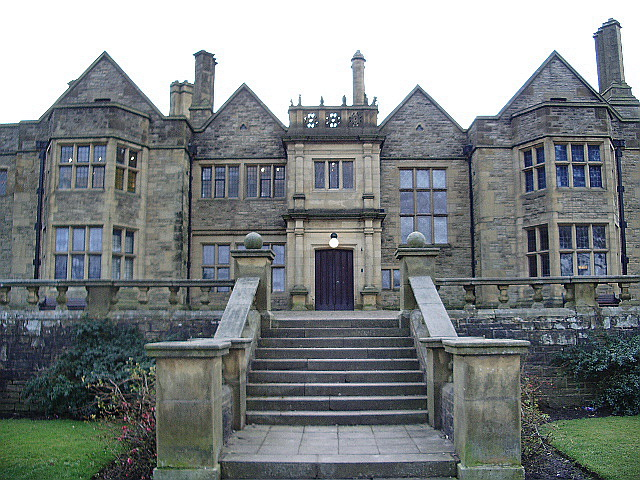
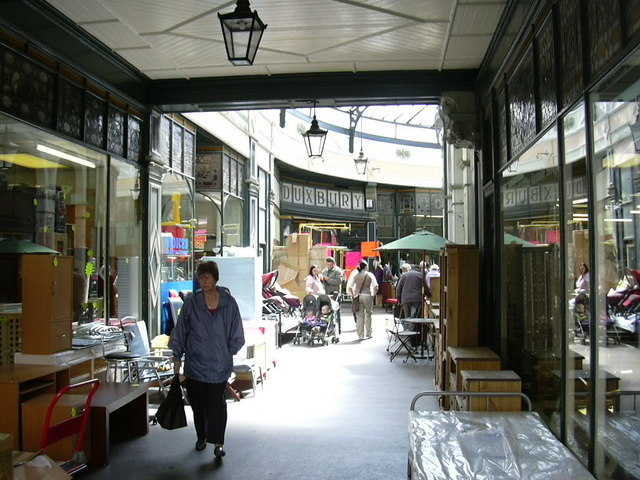
- The Library Crown Ground Accrington Town Hall Haworth Gallery Victorian Arcade

- Shown within Hyndburn Location within Lancashire
- Population: 34,897 (2021)
- OS grid reference: SD761286
- District: Hyndburn
- Shire county: Lancashire
- Region: North West
- Country: England
- Sovereign state: United Kingdom
- Post town: ACCRINGTON
- Postcode district: BB5
- Dialling code: 01254
- Police: Lancashire
- Fire: Lancashire
- Ambulance: North West
- UK Parliament: Hyndburn

Accrington /ˈækrɪŋtən/ is a town in the Hyndburn borough of Lancashire, England. It lies about 4 miles (6 km) east of Blackburn, 6 miles (10 km) west of Burnley, 13 miles (21 km) east of Preston, 20 miles (32 km) north of Manchester and is situated on the culverted River Hyndburn. Commonly abbreviated by locals to "Accy", the town has a population of 35,456 according to the 2011 census. Accrington is the largest settlement and the seat of the Hyndburn borough council.

Accrington is a former centre of the cotton and textile machinery industries. The town is famed for manufacturing the hardest and densest building bricks in the world, "The Accrington NORI" (iron), which were used in the construction of the Empire State Building and for the foundations of Blackpool Tower and the Haworth Art Gallery which holds Europe's largest collection of Tiffany glass. The club is home to EFL club Accrington Stanley. The town played a part in the founding of the football league system, with a defunct club (Accrington F.C.) being one of the twelve original clubs of the English Football League.

== History ==
=== Toponymy ===
The name "Accrington" likely has Anglo-Saxon origins. The earliest known recording of the name is found in the Parish of Whalley records from 850, where it is written as "Akeringastun". In subsequent records, the name appears in various forms, including "Akarinton" in 1194, "Akerunton", "Akerinton", and "Akerynton" in 1258, "Acrinton" in 1292, "Ackryngton" in 1311, and "Acryngton" in 1324. The name may derive from the Old English words "æcern", meaning "acorn", and "tun", meaning "farmstead" or "village", thus possibly meaning "acorn farmstead". However, some sources argue that this interpretation is not definitive and that alternative explanations may exist.

New Accrington, the southern part of the town, was historically part of the Forest of Blackburnshire. The area's abundance of oak trees can be inferred from local place names such as Broad Oak and Oak Hill. Acorns, a product of oak trees, were once a crucial food source for swine, which may have led to the naming of a farmstead after this resource. In the Lancashire dialect, "acorn" is pronounced "akran", which might have influenced the name's development.

No known Old English personal name corresponds to the first element in "Accrington". Nevertheless, the Frisian names "Akkrum" and "Akkeringa", as well as the Dutch name "Akkerghem", are believed to derive from the personal name "Akker". This finding suggests the possibility of a related Old English name from which "Accrington" could have originated. It is also worth noting that "Ingas" is the Old Norse word for "tribe", which may be relevant to the name's origin.

Overall, the etymology of "Accrington" is complex and there are several theories about its origin. While the "acorn farmstead" interpretation is the most commonly accepted explanation, further research and analysis may be needed to confirm or refute this theory, or to identify alternative possibilities.

=== Early history ===
There appears to be no mention of Accrington from the Roman period. The area typically appears to be heavily forested, with very few established settlements. According to folklore, a tall Danish tribal leader named Wada invaded the area between 760 and 798; who seems to have founded Waddington, Paddington (Padiham) and Akeringastun (Accrington). Descendants of the Wada held much of the lands until the sixteenth century. In 1442, the Waddingtons' hold leases on Berefeld (Bellfield), and in 1517 it is recorded that Thomas Waddington transferred the lands Scaytcliff (Scaitcliffe) and Peneworth (Pennyworth) to Nicholas Rishton and to his Son Geoffrey.

Accrington covers two townships which were established in 1507 following disafforestation; those of Old Accrington and New Accrington; which were merged in 1878 with the incorporation of the borough council. The William Yates map of The county Palatine of Lancaster printed in 1786 shows Old Accrington included the area of Oaklea and also the intersection of the Winburn River (now the River Hyndburn) and Warmden Brook. New Accrington included the area of Green Haworth and Broadfield. There have been settlements there since the medieval period, likely in the Grange Lane and Black Abbey area, and the King's Highway which passes above the town was at one time used by the kings and queens of England when they used the area for hunting when the Forest of Accrington was one of the four forests of the hundred of Blackburnshire.

Robert de Lacy gave the manor of Accrington to the monks of Kirkstall in the 12th century. The monks built a grange there; removing the inhabitants to make room for it. The locals got their revenge by setting fire to the new building, destroying its contents and in the process killing the three lay brothers who occupied it. An area of the town is named 'Black Abbey', a possible reference to the murders. Regardless of whatever happened, Accrington did not remain under monastic control for long before reverting to the de Lacys.

It is thought the monks of Kirkstall may have built a small chapel there during their tenure for the convenience of those in charge residing there and their tenants, but the records are uncertain. What is known is that there was a chapel in Accrington prior to 1553 where the vicar of Whalley was responsible for the maintenance of divine worship. However it did not have its own minister and it was served, when at all, by the curate of one of the adjacent chapels. In 1717 Accrington was served by the curate of Church, who preached there only once a month. St. James's Church was built in 1763, replacing the old chapel however it did not achieve parochial status until as late as 1870.

=== Industrial Revolution ===
Until around 1830, visitors considered Accrington to be just a "considerable village". The Industrial Revolution, however, resulted in large changes and Accrington's location on the confluence of a number of streams made it attractive to industry and a number of mills were built in the town in the mid-18th century. Further industrialisation then followed in the late-18th century and local landowners began building mansions in the area on the outskirts of the settlement where their mills were located while their employees lived in overcrowded unsanitary conditions in the centre.

Industrialisation resulted in rapid population growth during the 19th century, as people moved from over North West England to Accrington, with the population increasing from 3,266 in 1811 to 10,376 in 1851 to 43,211 in 1901 to its peak in 1911 at 45,029.

This fast population growth and slow response from the established church allowed non-conformism to flourish in the town. By the mid-19th century, there were Wesleyan, Primitive Methodist, United Free Methodist, Congregationalist, Baptist, Swedenborgian, Unitarian, Roman Catholic and Catholic Apostolic churches in the town. The Swedenborgian church was so grand that it was considered to be the 'Cathedral' of that denomination.

For many decades the textiles industry, the engineering industry and coal mining were the central activities of the town. Cotton mills and dye works provided work for the inhabitants, but often in very difficult conditions. There was a regular conflict with employers over wages and working conditions. On 24 April 1826 over 1,000 men and women, many armed, gathered at Whinney Hill in Clayton-le-Moors to listen to a speaker from where they marched on Sykes's Mill at Higher Grange Lane, near the site of the modern police station and magistrates' courts, and smashed over 60 looms. These riots spread from Accrington through Oswaldtwistle, Blackburn, Darwen, Rossendale, Bury and Chorley. In the end, after three days of riots 1,139 looms were destroyed, 4 rioters and 2 bystanders shot dead by the authorities in Rossendale and 41 rioters sentenced to death (all of whose sentences were commuted).

In 1842 'plug riots' a general strike spread from town to town due to conditions in the town. In a population of 9,000 people as few as 100 were fully employed. From 15 August 1842 the situation boiled over and bands of men entered the mills which were running and stopped the machinery by knocking out the boiler plugs. This allowed the water and steam to escape shutting down the mill machinery. Thousands of strikers walked over the hills from one town to another to persuade people to join the strike in civil disturbances that lasted about a week. The strike was associated with the Chartist movement but eventually proved unsuccessful in its aims.

In the early 1860s the Lancashire cotton famine badly affected Accrington, although less so than the wider area due to its more diverse economy, with as many as half of the town's mill employees out of work at one time.

Conditions were such that a Local Board of Health was constituted in 1853 and the town itself incorporated in 1878 allowing the enforcement of local laws to improve the town.

=== Accrington Pals ===
One well-known association the town has is with the 'Accrington Pals', the nickname given to the smallest home town battalion of volunteers formed to fight in the First World War. The Pals battalions were a peculiarity of the 1914-18 war: Lord Kitchener, the Secretary of State for War, believed that it would help recruitment if friends and work-mates from the same town were able to join up and fight together. Strictly speaking, the 'Accrington Pals' battalion is properly known as the '11th East Lancashire Regiment': the nickname is a little misleading, since of the four 250-strong companies that made up the original battalion only one was composed of men from Accrington. The rest volunteered from other east Lancashire towns such as Burnley, Blackburn and Chorley.

The Pals' first day of action, 1 July 1916, took place in Serre, near Montauban in the north of France. It was part of the 'Big Push' (later known as the Battle of the Somme) that was intended to force the German Army into a retreat from the Western Front, a line they had held since late 1914. The German defences in Serre were supposed to have been obliterated by sustained, heavy, British shelling during the preceding week; however, as the battalion advanced it met with fierce resistance. 235 men were killed and a further 350 wounded – more than half of the battalion – within half an hour. Similarly, desperate losses were suffered elsewhere on the front, in a disastrous day for the British Army (approximately 19,000 British soldiers were killed in a single day).

Later in the year, the East Lancashire Regiment was rebuilt with new volunteers – in all, 865 Accrington men were killed during World War I. All of these names are recorded on a war memorial, an imposing white stone cenotaph, which stands in Oak Hill Park in the south of the town. The cenotaph also lists the names of 173 local fatalities from World War II. The trenches from which the Accrington Pals advanced on 1 July 1916 are still visible in John Copse west of the village of Serre, and there is a memorial there made of Accrington brick.

After the war and until 1986, Accrington Corporation buses were painted in the regimental colours of red and blue with gold lining. The mudguards were painted black as a sign of mourning.

== Demography ==
The 2001 census gave the population of Accrington town as 35,200. The figure for the urban area was 71,220, increased from 70,442 in 1991. This total includes Accrington, Church, Clayton-le-Moors, Great Harwood and Oswaldtwistle.

The 2011 census gave a population of 35,456 for the Accrington built-up area subdivision (which includes Huncoat, Baxenden and Rising Bridge in Rossendale) and a population of 125,000 for the wider Accrington/Rossendale Built-up area. The area in 2001 was listed as 696 hectares (2.69 mi^{2}), whereas in 2011 it was 742.25 hectares (2.87 mi^{2}).

The borough of Hyndburn as a whole has a population of 80,734. This includes Accrington Urban Area and other outlying towns and villages such as; Altham, Rishton, part of Belthorn, and Knuzden and Whitebirk (considered suburbs of Blackburn).

== Economy ==
Historically, cotton and textile machinery were important industries in Accrington, with many mills and factories operating in the town during the 19th and early 20th centuries. The town was renowned for its production of cotton cloth, and several of its mills became famous for their high-quality fabrics, including the Victoria and Jubilee mills. However, like many other towns in Lancashire, the decline of the cotton industry in the mid-20th century led to a significant reduction in manufacturing activity in Accrington.

One notable industrial product associated with Accrington is NORI bricks, a type of iron-hard engineering brick that was produced in nearby Huncoat. The NORI brickworks were established in the 1860s, and their products were widely used in the construction of mills, factories, and other industrial buildings throughout the north of England, as well as Blackpool Tower and the Empire State Building. The brickworks closed in 2013 due to declining demand, but reopened in 2015 after being acquired by a local businessman.

Today, the town's economy is more diverse, with a range of businesses and services operating in the area. Many of the old mill and factory buildings have been repurposed as offices, workshops, and other facilities, providing space for a variety of enterprises. The town also has a number of retail and commercial areas, including the Arndale Centre and the Peel Centre, which are home to a range of shops, restaurants, and other businesses.

Accrington power station was a coal and refuse-fired electricity generating station that operated on Argyle Street adjacent to the gasworks between 1900 and 1958. The power station supplied electricity to Accrington, Haslingden, and the Altham and Clayton-le-Moors areas. The site is now a residential area.

Accrington remains a local centre of business and industry in the region, with a rich history of manufacturing and innovation. The area benefits from its location close to major transport links, including the M65 motorway and the East Lancashire railway line, which connect Accrington to other parts of the county and beyond.

In recent years, the town has seen investment in new development projects, including the £60 million "Civic Quarter" regeneration scheme, which aims to revitalize the town center and create new jobs and opportunities for local people. The project includes the construction of a new public square, a state-of-the-art leisure center, and new office and retail spaces, as well as the refurbishment of existing buildings.

In addition to its commercial and industrial activities, Accrington is also home to a number of cultural and recreational amenities. The town has a rich sporting heritage, with Accrington Stanley Football Club, founded in 1968, representing the town in the English Football League. The town also has a strong tradition of brass band music, with several local bands competing at regional and national level. Other cultural attractions in the town include the Haworth Art Gallery, which houses a collection of British art and decorative arts, and the Accrington Market Hall, which runs events and activities.

=== Poverty, regeneration and investment ===
Some areas of Accrington have high levels of poverty and deprivation. In one area of the town in 2020, 77% of children were living in poverty. Deprivation increased in Accrington from 2004 to 2010. The Accrington Town Centre Investment Plan 2022-2032 states "Accrington has severe pockets of deprivation – particularly around employment, income and living environment - which has been getting worse during the last 20 years".

The council has a regeneration plan in place, which will, according to the council, boost the local economy. The plan is to upgrade old shops and to build a bus station. A memorial for the Accrington Pals may be built outside the town hall.

The Hyndburn Borough Council plans to spend £10 million to refurbish the town centre, including:

- Revitalising the town square to attract visitors.
- Building a new bus station. Plans for the new bus station were put forward in January 2013 and approved in October 2014. The bus station was completed during and officially opened on 11 July 2016. The new station was criticised by traders as the old station was closer and easier to get to.

Half of Blackburn Road is being refurbished and is now being made into a more attractive shopping street, upgrading shops, adding more trees, and repaving the pavements.

As of 2014, two new phases were being built: the first one called the Acorn Park, where new houses were being built with balconies and greener spaces, and Project Phoenix, which will also include new housing.

== Geography ==
Accrington is a hill town located at between the Pennines and the West Pennine Moors, within a bowl and largely encircled by surrounding hills to rising to a height of 409 metres (1,342 ft) in the case of Hameldon Hill to the east. The River Hyndburn or Accrington Brook flows through the centre of the town. Hill settlements origins were as the economic foci of the district engaging in the spinning and weaving of woollen cloth. Wool, lead and coal were other local industries.

Geographical coordinates: 53° 46' 0" North, 2° 21' 0" West. Height above sea level: there is a spot height outside the Market Hall which is 133.5 metres (438 ft) the benchmark on the side of the neighbouring Town Hall is 441.10 feet (134.45 m). The highest height in the town is 320 metres (1,050 ft) which is in Baxenden and the lowest at the town hall which is at 132.5 metres (435 ft). Accrington is lowering in elevation travelling northwards towards the Hyndburn. North of the river the elevation rises again, crossing over the watershed between Hyndburn and River Calder, both eventually leading into River Ribble via separate routes. The Hyndburn district further north eventually falls to the modest elevation of the Calder river banks.

== Transport ==
=== Railway ===
Accrington railway station, located on the East Lancashire Line, provides strong local travel links. The station runs trains locally and from Blackpool to York. However, recent changes to the train timetables have increased the journey time to Preston by up to 1.5 hours, a vital link to London or Scotland. In 2015, a train service to Manchester via the Todmorden Curve opened, providing a new rail link south to Manchester.

=== Roads ===
The town is served by junction seven of the M65 motorway and the A680 road, which runs from Rochdale to Whalley. The town is also linked from the A56 dual carriageway which briefly merges with the A680, connecting to the M66 motorway heading towards Manchester. The closest airports are Manchester Airport, Blackpool Airport, and Leeds Bradford Airport, all within 30 miles.

=== Bus ===
Several bus companies provide services in the town, including Pilkington Bus, Stagecoach Cumbria and North Lancashire and Transdev Blazefield subsidiaries Blackburn Bus Company and Burnley Bus Company.Regular bus services connect Accrington to other towns in East Lancashire, including Blackburn, Oswaldtwistle, Rishton, Burnley, and Clitheroe.

=== Cycleways and footpaths ===
The trackbed from Accrington to Baxenden, which was once a rail link south to Manchester, is now a linear treelined cycleway/footpath. The cycleway/footpath is a popular route for cycling and walking, offering views

== Public services ==
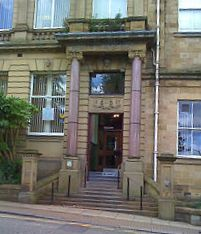
Entrance to Accrington Library

Accrington Library, on St James Street was built in 1908 as a Carnegie library. It has a stained glass window by Gustav Hiller and was a place of inspiration for the young Jeanette Winterson.

Near the Tesco supermarket, there is Accrington Skate Park which is popular during the school holidays. On Broadway, Accrington Police Station serves the Borough of Hyndburn. In April 2003, Hyndburn Community Fire Station opened, also serving the Borough of Hyndburn.

== Police services ==
The town is served by the Lancashire Constabulary Police station on Broadway after moving into town from its previous location on Manchester Road as an effort to save money due to rising expenses and decreasing funding by the government. Crime is very low in Accrington compared to nearby towns.

Policing of the Railway station and railway-owned properties are served by the British Transport Police, nearest post in Preston.

== Social ==
=== Governance ===
Accrington is represented in parliament as a part of the constituency of Hyndburn. The constituency boundaries do not align exactly with those of the district of the same name.

Accrington was first represented nationally after the Redistribution of Seats Act 1885 after the 1885 general election by Accrington (UK Parliament constituency). This seat was abolished in the 1983 general election and replaced with the present constituency of Hyndburn (UK Parliament constituency).

Accrington became incorporated as a municipal borough in 1878. Under the Local Government Act 1972, since 1974, the town has formed part of the larger Borough of Hyndburn including the former Urban Districts of Oswaldtwistle, Church, Clayton-le-Moors, Great Harwood and Rishton.

Hyndburn consists of 16 wards, electing a total of 35 councillors. Due to its size Accrington is represented by a number of wards in the Borough of Hyndburn. The town largely consists of the Milnshaw, Peel, Central, Barnfield and Spring Hill wards, although some parts of those wards are in other towns in the borough.

=== Health ===
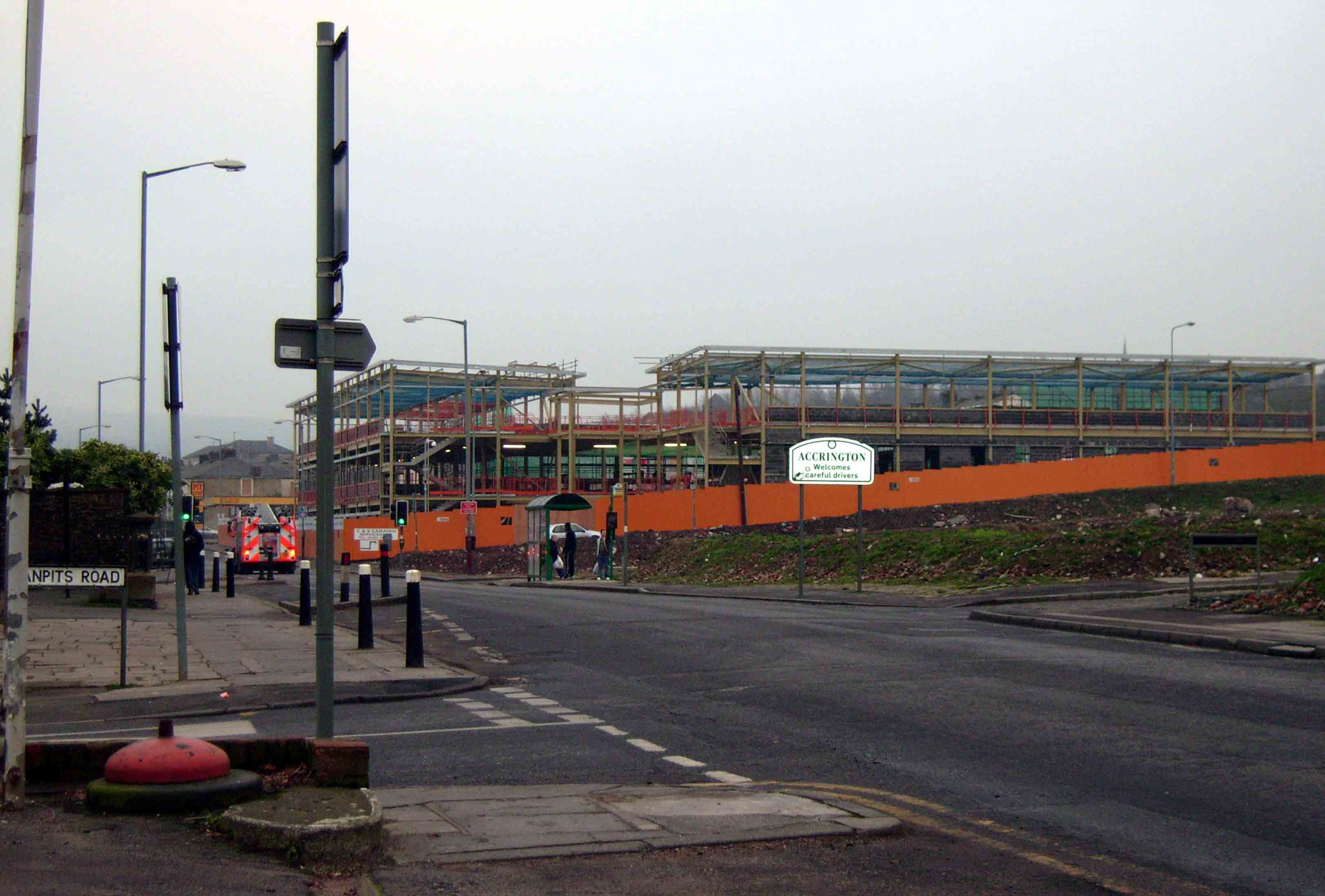
Accrington Acorn PHCC under construction

The local hospital is Accrington Victoria Hospital however, as it only deals with minor issues, Accident and Emergency is provided by the Royal Blackburn Hospital. Other services are provided at the Accrington Pals Primary Health Care Centre and the Accrington Acorn Primary Health Care Centre.

=== Media ===
The principal local radio station is Central Radio North West broadcasting on DAB across East Lancashire, providing local news, talk, and music. Accrington also falls in the coverage area of BBC Radio Lancashire, Hits Radio Lancashire, Greatest Hits Radio Lancashire, Smooth North West and Heart North West.

Local news and television programmes are provided by BBC North West and ITV Granada. Television signals are received from the Winter Hill TV transmitter and one of the three local relay transmitters (Woodnook, Pendle Forest and Haslingden).

The town is served by the local newspaper, Accrington Observer, which publishes on Fridays, and by the Lancashire Post and Lancashire Telegraph.

== Ancient customs and traditions of Accrington ==
Accrington, as a historic town, has been home to several ancient customs and traditions that have shaped its local culture and identity. While some of these customs may no longer be practised, they offer valuable insights into the town's past.

=== Rush-Bearing Festival ===
One of the most notable ancient customs in Accrington was the rush-bearing festival. This annual event involved the gathering of rushes from nearby marshlands and meadows to be used as fresh flooring material in local churches. The rushes were then transported to the churches in decorative carts or wagons, accompanied by a festive procession, music, and dancing. This event was once widespread across Lancashire and the North of England, but its prevalence in Accrington is particularly noteworthy.

=== Wakes Week ===
Another significant custom in Accrington was Wakes Week, a holiday period that took place in the town and surrounding areas. Typically, it occurred during the summer months and lasted for one week. During this time, local mills and factories closed, allowing workers to enjoy a much-needed break from their labor-intensive occupations. Wakes Week often featured various festivities, such as fairs, carnivals, and other communal events, which brought the community together in celebration.

=== Local sports and games ===
In the past, Accrington was known for hosting traditional sports and games, which were enjoyed by the local community. Some of these sports included football, cricket, and quoits. These games not only provided entertainment but also fostered a sense of community spirit and camaraderie.

== Sport ==
=== Football team ===
Accrington Stanley F.C., entered the Football League in 1921 with the formation of the old Third Division (North); after haunting the lower reaches of English football for forty years, they eventually resigned from the League in 1962, due to financial problems, and folded in 1965. The club was reformed three years later and then worked its way through the non-league divisions to reach the Nationwide Conference in 2003. In the 2005–06 season, Stanley, after winning against Woking with three matches to spare, secured a place back in the Football League and the town celebrated with a small parade and honours placed on senior executives of the team. One of the teams relegated— and thus being replaced by Stanley—were Oxford United, who was voted into the Football League to replace the previous Accrington Stanley. The football stadium is called the Crown Ground. Until the 2012–13 season, when Fleetwood Town entered the league, Accrington was the smallest town in England and Wales with a Football League club.

Accrington Stanley Football Club has had its own pub in the town, the Crown, since July 2007.

==== Team history ====
An earlier club, Accrington F.C., was one of the twelve founder members of the Football League in 1888. However, their time in league football was even less successful and considerably briefer than that of Accrington Stanley: they dropped out of the league in 1893 and folded shortly afterwards due to financial problems. The town of Accrington thus has the unique "distinction" of having lost two separate clubs from league football. Accrington Stanley F.C. are currently placed in EFL League Two after being relegated from EFL League One in the 2022/23 season, having finished 23rd.

=== Cricket ===
Accrington Cricket Club plays at Thorneyholme Road in the Lancashire League. Cricket is also played in parks. Schools nearby have shown major interest in cricket and have held cricket training and tournaments.

=== Other sports ===
There are two sports centres, the main one being the Hyndburn Sports Centre, which recently renovated its swimming pool area and is situated near Lidl.

== Education ==
Accrington has the following primary schools:

- St Mary's RC Primary School, Clayton le Moors
- Hyndburn Park Primary School,
- Peel Park Primary School,
- Sacred Heart Primary School,
- Benjamin Hargreaves CE Primary School,
- Springhill County Primary School,
- Accrington Huncoat Primary School,
- St Johns and St Augustines CE Primary School,
- St Mary Magdalen's CE Primary School,
- St Nicholas' CE Primary School,
- Woodnook Primary School,
- St James CE Primary School, Altham,
- St Johns CE Primary School, Baxenden,
- All Saints CE Primary School,
- Mount Pleasant Primary School,
- Green Haworth CE Primary School,
- Stonefold CE Primary School,
- St Peters CE Primary School.
- St Mary's RC Primary School, Oswaldtwistle.
- St Anne's and St Joseph's RC Primary School
- St Oswald's RC Primary School
- Hippings Methodist Primary School Oswaldtwistle
- St Andrews CoE Primary School Oswaldtwistle
- St Oswalds CoE Primary School Knuzden
- West End Primary School Oswaldtwistle
- Moor End Community Primary School Oswaldtwistle
- St Paul's CoE Primary School Oswaldtwistle

The secondary schools serving Accrington are:

- Accrington Academy
- The Hollins
- The Hyndburn Academy
- Mount Carmel Roman Catholic High School
- Rhyddings
- St Christopher's Church of England High School

The college in the town centre is Accrington and Rossendale College; nearby universities include University Centre at Blackburn College, and the University of Central Lancashire in Preston.

== Landmarks ==
=== Haworth Art Gallery ===
The Haworth Art Gallery is an art museum located in Accrington, Lancashire, England. The gallery is housed in a Tudor-style mansion, originally known as Hollins Hill, which was built in 1909 by William Haworth, a local cotton manufacturer. Upon his death in 1913, William Haworth bequeathed the mansion and its surrounding parkland to the people of Accrington. The gallery opened in 1921.

The Haworth Art Gallery holds the largest public collection of Tiffany glass in Europe, known as the Tiffany Glass Collection. The collection was donated by Joseph Briggs, an Accrington native who worked for the famous American artist and designer Louis Comfort Tiffany. In addition to the Tiffany Glass Collection, the gallery holds a range of artwork, including 19th and 20th-century oil paintings, watercolours, prints, and sculptures.

The Haworth Art Gallery also holds temporary exhibitions showing contemporary art by local and national artists.

=== The Viaduct ===
The Viaduct is a bridge which has a railway line on it, it goes through the town and has many storage units and shop on sale by National Rail. The Viaduct ends at the Accrington Eco Station.

=== Town Hall ===
Accrington Town Hall was built in memory of Sir Robert Peel and opened as the Peel Institute in 1858; it is also listed.

=== The Arcade ===
The Arcade is a Victorian shopping centre with about 10-15 shops and restaurants.

=== Oak Hill Park ===
Oak Hill Park is a large and old park with a view of Accrington. It has won awards, such as the Green Flag Award in 2024–25. It has also been awarded an Eco Award. It is on Manchester Road.

=== Haworth Park ===
Haworth Park can be accessed from Manchester Road and is off Hollins Lane at the top of Harcourt Road. The Park was originally William Haworth's private residence. The Haworth Art Gallery holds the Tiffany Glass collection.

== The Coppice and Peel Park ==
Peel Park is a green space in the centre of Accrington. The park was opened by William Peel on 29 September 1909 and was originally called the Corporation Park. The park was renamed in honour of William Peel, the grandson of Sir Robert Peel, in recognition of his service as a Liberal MP for the town. The park covers an area of approximately 18 acres and includes a wide range of features, including a lake, flower gardens, a bandstand, and a bowling green.

The Coppice is a hill in the park, and provides a 2.2-mile scenic walk around the park, offering visitors views of the surrounding area. The Coppice has been part of the park since it was first opened, and there have been refurbishments to the paths and monuments at the top of the hill over the years.

In 2009, the people of Accrington celebrated the centenary of the Coppice being handed over to the town. The occasion was marked with a series of events and activities, including a refurbishment of the paths and monument at the top of the hill. Since then, there have been several revamps to the playground area of the park.

Events and festivals are held in the park throughout the year, including the annual Accrington Food and Drink Festival, which takes place in the summer.

== Early landowners ==
This section outlines the contributions of landowning families, including the de Lacy, Walmsley, Peel, Hargreaves and Haworth families, to the development of Accrington.

=== De Lacy family ===
The de Lacy family were the first recorded landowners in Accrington, instrumental in the town's establishment as a regional center for agriculture and trade.

=== Walmsley family ===
The Walmsley family acquired the manor of Accrington in the 16th century and owned several mills, contributing to the expansion of Accrington's textile industry.

=== Peel family ===
The Peel family were key figures in the 18th and 19th centuries, with Sir Robert Peel, 1st Baronet, establishing textile mills in the area, significantly boosting Accrington's economy.

=== Hargreaves family ===
The Hargreaves family built the Broad Oak Print Works in 1778, which became one of the largest textile printing establishments in the region.

=== Haworth family ===
The Haworth family were prominent landowners in Accrington, with James Haworth establishing Haworth Mill in the early 1800s. The family's investments in local industry contributed to the town's economic development.

=== Peel, Yates and Co. ===
Peel, Yates and Co. was a partnership between the Peel family and the Yates family. The Peel family, led by Robert Peel (1750–1830), and the Yates family, led by William Yates (1769–1849), established Peel, Yates and Co. in 1795. The company owned and operated several cotton mills in Accrington, including the Woodnook Mill, which employed around 800 people during its peak operation.

=== Duckworth family ===
The Duckworth family were landowners and industrialists in Accrington during the 19th century. They invested in the local textile industry, owning several mills, such as the Broad Oak Mill and the Spring Hill Mill. The Duckworth family's mills employed hundreds of workers.

=== Birtwistle family ===
The Birtwistle family were involved in the cotton industry in Accrington, owning and operating cotton mills during the 19th century. Members of the family, including John Birtwistle (1807–1884), owned mills like the Church Bank Mill and the Wellington Mill, employing over 1,000 workers between the two establishments.

=== Holden family ===
The Holden family contributed to Accrington's development through their involvement in various industries, such as coal mining and brick manufacturing. The family-owned Accrington Brick and Tile Company, established by Joseph Holden

== Notable residents ==
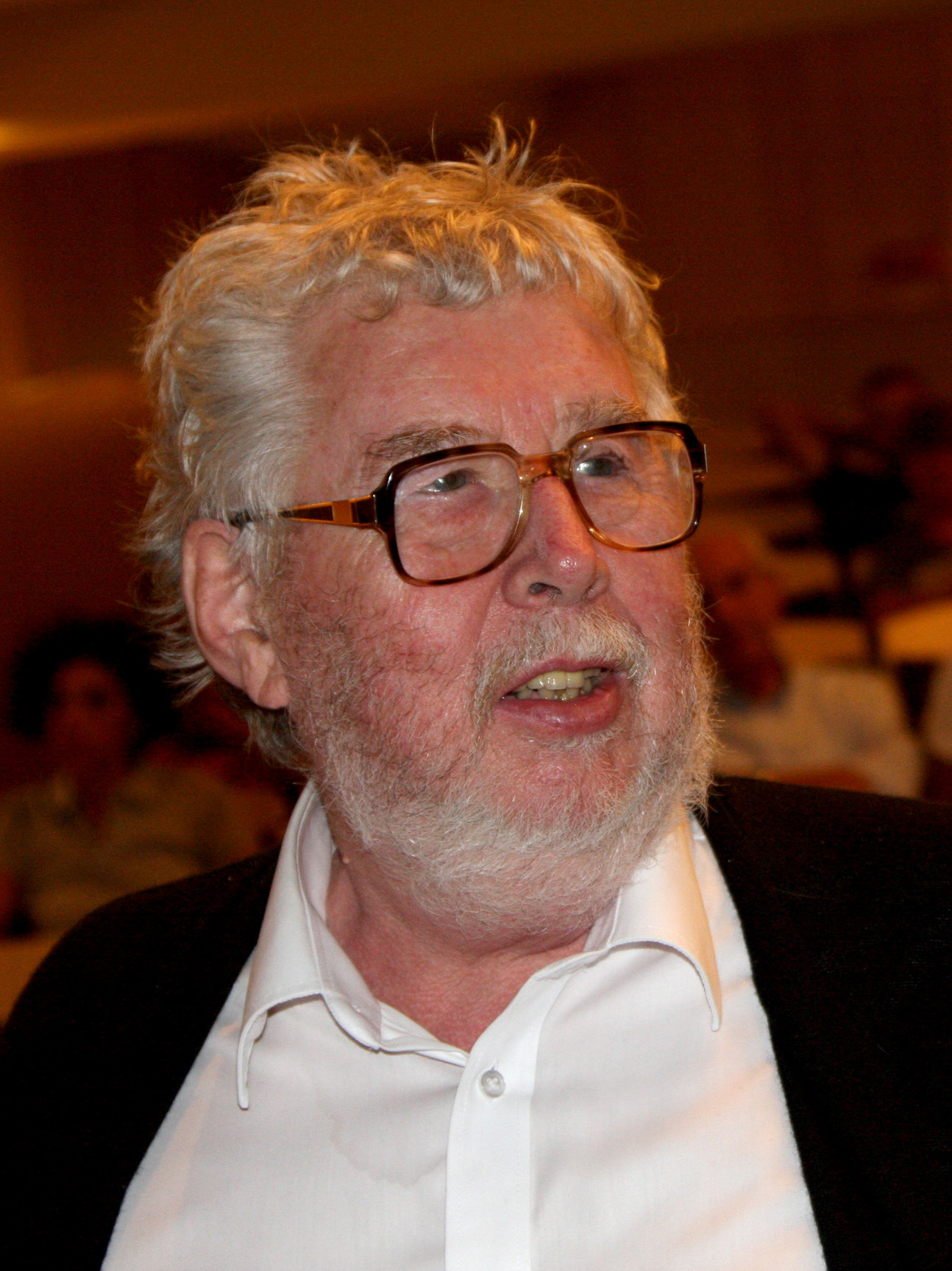
Harrison Birtwistle, 2008

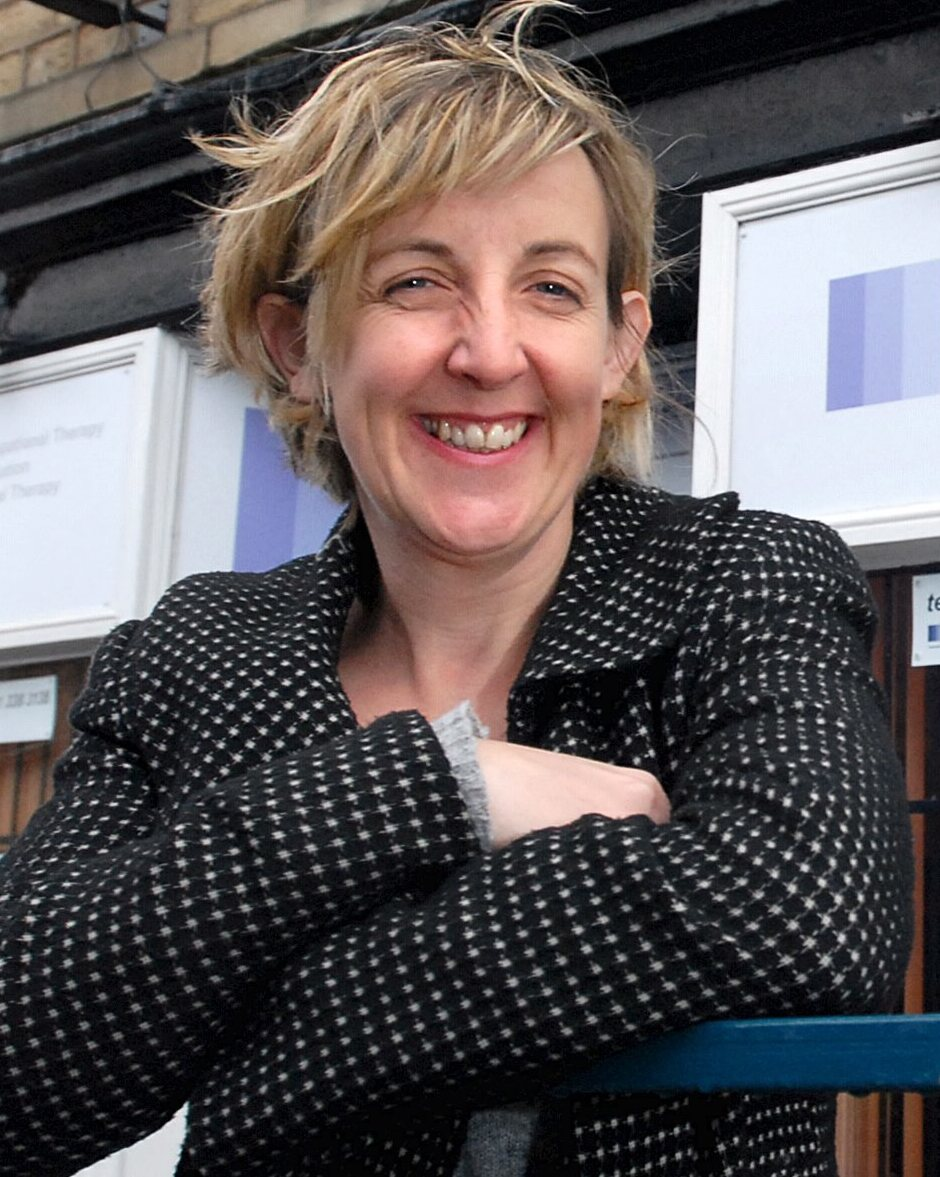
Julie Hesmondhalgh, 2008

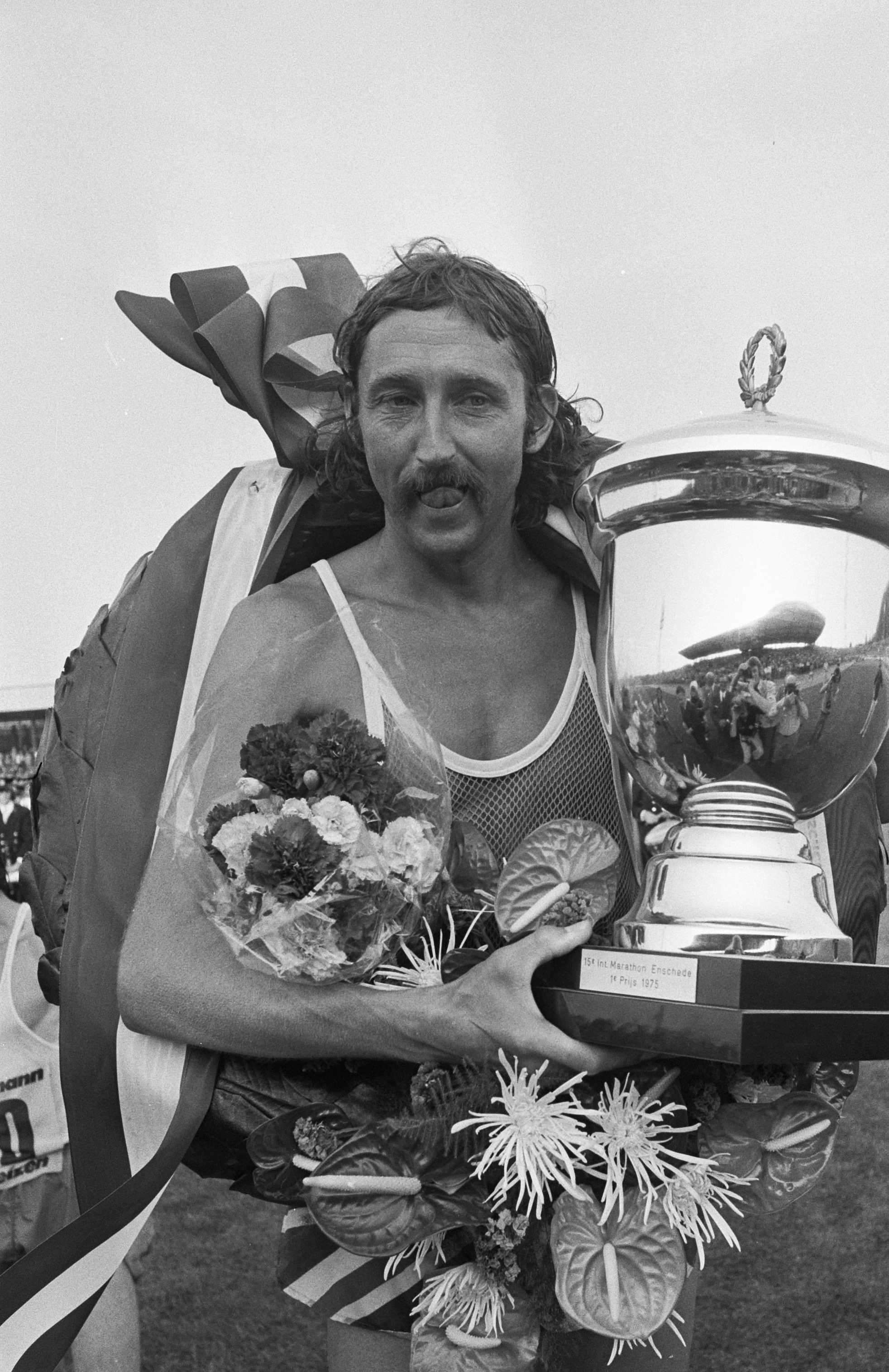
Ron Hill, 1975

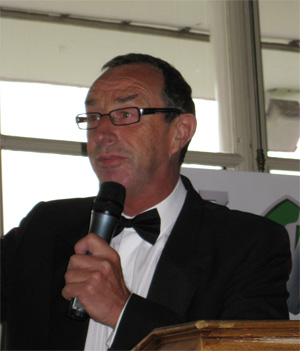
David Lloyd, 2009

- Timothy Jollie (c.1659–1714), a nonconformist minister and notable educator in the north of England.
- William Macrorie (1831–1905), bishop of Maritzburg and held the perpetual curacy of Accrington from 1865.
- Herbert Vincent Mills (1856–1928), a British socialist activist.
- Frederick Higginbottom (1859–1943), journalist and newspaper editor, edited The Pall Mall Gazette
- Walter Marsden (1882–1969), an English sculptor from Church, Lancashire
- Jenny Kenney (1884–1961), sister of suffragette Annie Kenney; she taught at Montessori school in the 1900s
- Derek Oldham (1887–1968), singer and actor, performed in the tenor roles of the Savoy Operas
- Netherwood Hughes (1900–2009), World War I veteran, died nearby aged 108
- John Rex Whinfield (1901–1966), chemist, inventor of Terylene (polyester), a synthetic fibre.
- Frank McKenna (1906–1994), British RAF service police detective in the Special Investigation Branch
- Nicholas Freeston (1907–1978), award-winning local poet, died locally
- Sir Frank Roberts (1907–1998), British diplomat, helped develop Anglo-Soviet and Anglo-German relations.
- Sir Harrison Birtwistle (1934–2022), composer of contemporary classical music.
- Mystic Meg (1942–2023), an English astrologer, real name Margaret Anne Lake
- Jon Anderson (born 1944), singer with rock band Yes, born locally
- John Virtue (born 1947), artist who specialises in monochrome landscapes.
- Jeanette Winterson (born 1959), author; Oranges Are Not the Only Fruit is an account of her local childhood
- Andy Kanavan (born 1961), rock drummer with post-punk bands Dire Straits and Level 9
- Vicky Entwistle (born 1968), actor, Janice Battersby in the TV Soap Coronation Street
- Julie Hesmondhalgh (born 1970), actor, Hayley Cropper in the TV Soap Coronation Street
- Anthony Rushton (born 1971), tech entrepreneur, co-founder and CEO of Telemetry.
- Paul Manning (born 1973), undercover police officer in Canada and author
- Diana Vickers (born 1991), singer-songwriter and actress; played title role in a revival of The Rise and Fall of Little Voice.
- Reece Bibby (born 1998), was member of Stereo Kicks now a member of the band New Hope Club

=== Sport ===
- John Haworth (1876–1924), football manager of Accrington Stanley, 1897–1910 & Burnley 1910–1924
- John Edmondson (1882-??), footballer who played 239 games for Bolton Wanderers
- Alan Ramsbottom (1936–2023), professional cyclist who twice rode the Tour de France.
- Ron Hill (1938–2021), long-distance and marathon runner, ran two Olympic Marathons 1964 and 1972.
- Val Robinson (1941–2022), an England field hockey international, who played 149 international games
- David Lloyd (born 1947), cricketer, played 407 First-class cricket games and 9 Test cricket games, now a pundit for Sky Sports
- Hughen Riley (1947–2025), footballer who played 336 games including 121 for Crewe Alexandra
- Graeme Fowler (born 1957), former cricket batsman, played 292 First-class cricket games and 21 Test cricket games, occasional pundit on BBC Radio's Test Match Special
- Mike Duxbury (born 1959), footballer, played 391 games, including 299 for Manchester United & 10 for England
- Peter Martin (born 1968), former cricketer who played 213 First-class cricket games and 8 Test cricket matches
- Graham Lloyd (born 1969), cricketer who played 203 First-class cricket games
- Martin Clark (born 1970), footballer who played 360 games including 231 games in two sessions at Southport
- Lucas Neill (born 1978), Australian footballer, former captain of the Australia men's national soccer team, played in the 2006 FIFA World Cup and 2010 FIFA World Cup. Current Vice Chair & Performance Director at Accrington Stanley Women's FC.
- Richard Chaplow (born 1985), retired footballer who played 361 games including over 60 for both Burnley & Preston North End
- Shane Warne, Australian cricket legend played for Accrington Cricket Club in 1991.

== See also ==
- Listed buildings in Accrington
- Howard & Bullough
