= Martin Clark =

Martin Clark may refer to:

- Martin Clark (author) (born 1959), American judge and author
- Martin Clark (footballer, born 1968), former Scottish footballer
- Martin Clark (footballer, born 1970), former English footballer
- Martin Clark (snooker player) (born 1968), former English professional snooker player
- Martin Clark (historian) (1938–2017), British historian

== See also ==
- Martin Clarke (disambiguation)
- Clark (surname)
