= Holland's Pies =

Food manufacturer, Lancashire, England

Holland's
- Type: Private
- Industry: Food manufacturing
- Founded: 1851; 175 years ago
- Founder: John Whittaker
- Headquarters: Baxenden, England
- Products: Pies, pasties, puddings
- Parent: 2 Sisters Food Group
- Website: hollandspies.co.uk

Holland's Pies is a manufacturer of pies and puddings based in Baxenden, near Accrington in Lancashire, England. Owned by 2 Sisters Food Group, the company also produces pasties and sausage rolls.

== History ==
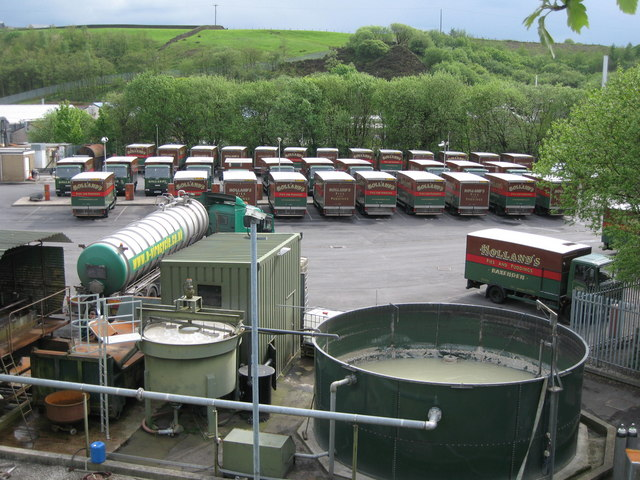
Holland's distinctive fleet of delivery vans in the factory yard

Holland's was founded by father and daughter John and Sarah Whittaker in 1851, as a confectioners shop in Haslingden, Rossendale, Lancashire. Sarah married Richard Holland in 1869, taking control of the business and renaming it Walter Holland and Sons. In 1907, the business moved to a much larger bakery in Baxenden, from where pies were delivered locally by horse and cart.

Delivery vans were first introduced in 1927, with the company moving to its current premises two years later. By 1938, there was a fleet of twenty vans making regular deliveries around the North West. Cake production ended at the bakery, due to sugar rationing during World War II, and meat pies became more popular.

After the war, in 1946, the decision was taken to sell the company to R.Gummer Ltd., a provisions firm of London and Liverpool. Holland's was bought out by Pork Farms in 1972, who in turn were bought by Northern Foods in 1979. Holland's thus became part of one of the major food manufacturing groups in the United Kingdom.

Remaining part of the Northern Foods portfolio, following the sale of Pork Farms to Vision Capital in January 2007, Holland's pies and puddings are sold at 85% of fish and chip shops in North West England.

== Products ==
These are the products currently manufactured by Holland's:

=== Pies ===
- Just steak
- Steak and kidney
- Potato and meat
- Meat (beef and pork)
- Cheese and onion
- Chicken and mushroom
- Lancashire hotpot
- Pork
- Chicken tikka
- Peppered steak
- Steak and Guinness
- Beef and onion
- Chicken and ham
- Potato, cheese and onion
- Chicken balti

=== Pasties ===
- Cornish pasty
- Cheese and onion
- Beef and vegetable
- Corned beef

=== Others ===
- Sausage rolls
- Steak and kidney puddings

== Football ==
The pies are sold on matchdays at northern football clubs including Manchester City, Huddersfield Town, Stockport County, Bradford City, Bolton Wanderers, Blackburn Rovers and Blackpool. They were endorsed by celebrity chef and Norwich City director, Delia Smith in July 2000, who introduced them to Carrow Road.

In June 2007, Holland's Pies signed a shirt sponsorship deal with Lancashire club Burnley. The partnership ended in 2009.

== Endorsements ==
Celebrities who have endorsed Holland's Pies include chef Delia Smith, radio presenters Mark Radcliffe and Marc Riley, Cilla Black, Peter Kay and Wayne Hemingway.
