= Baxenden (ward) =

- Shown within Hyndburn
- Area: 4.46 km^{2} (1.72 sq mi)
- Population: 4,042 (2011)
  - Density: 906/km^{2} (2,350/sq mi)
- District: Hyndburn
- Ceremonial county: Lancashire
- Region: North West
- Country: England
- Sovereign state: United Kingdom
- UK Parliament: Hyndburn
- Councillors: Terry Hurn (Conservative); Kath Pratt (Conservative)

Baxenden is one of the 18 electoral wards that form the Parliamentary constituency of Hyndburn, Lancashire, England. The ward returns two councillors to represent Baxenden village on the Hyndburn Borough Council. As of the May 2019 Council election, Baxenden had an electorate of 3,282.
