= Level 9 =

Level 9 may refer to:

- Level 9 Computing, a software developer primarily known for their 1980s text adventures
- Level 9 (TV series)
- Level 9 (band)
