= H. Gustave Hiller =

British painter

Henry Gustave Hiller (1864–1946) was an artist based in Liverpool, England. He studied at the Manchester School of Art and is mainly known as a designer of painted gesso reliefs and stained glass.

== Personal life ==
Gustave Hiller was born in Manchester, the third child of Henry Hiller (1833 – 1913) and Sarah Ann Hiller (née Littlewood) (1833 – 1870). From an early age and throughout his life he was a keen naturalist with a particular interest in insects. During his time as a student at the Manchester School of Art, the Director was Walter Crane who influenced his work. Hiller first worked as the Head Designer for Reuben Bennett's Studio and several examples of this collaboration are now held at the Stained Glass Museum, Ely. In 1892, he married Ada Crippin and, in about 1904, he left Bennett's Studio to set up a studio of his own in Seel Street in central Liverpool where he made gesso reliefs and stained glass for secular and ecclesiastical settings, mainly for clients in the North West of England. The firm H G Hiller &Co. was dissolved in 1932. Hiller moved to Anglesey in 1936 and pursued his interest in natural history, especially insects, spiders and algae, until his death in 1946.

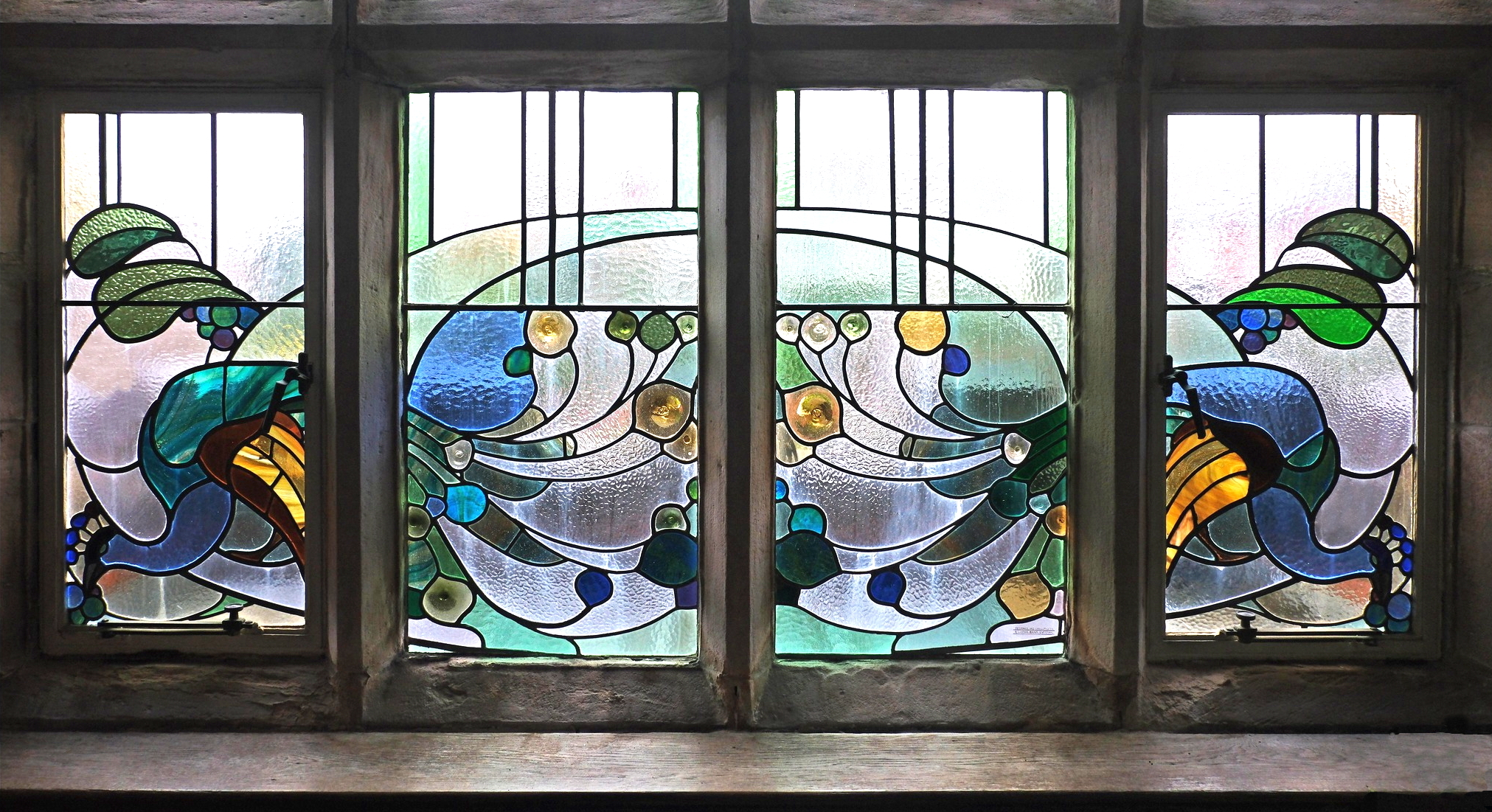
Window designed and made by Gustave Hiller on staircase of Blundellsands Classic (Crosby, Liverpool) formerly hotel, now apartments

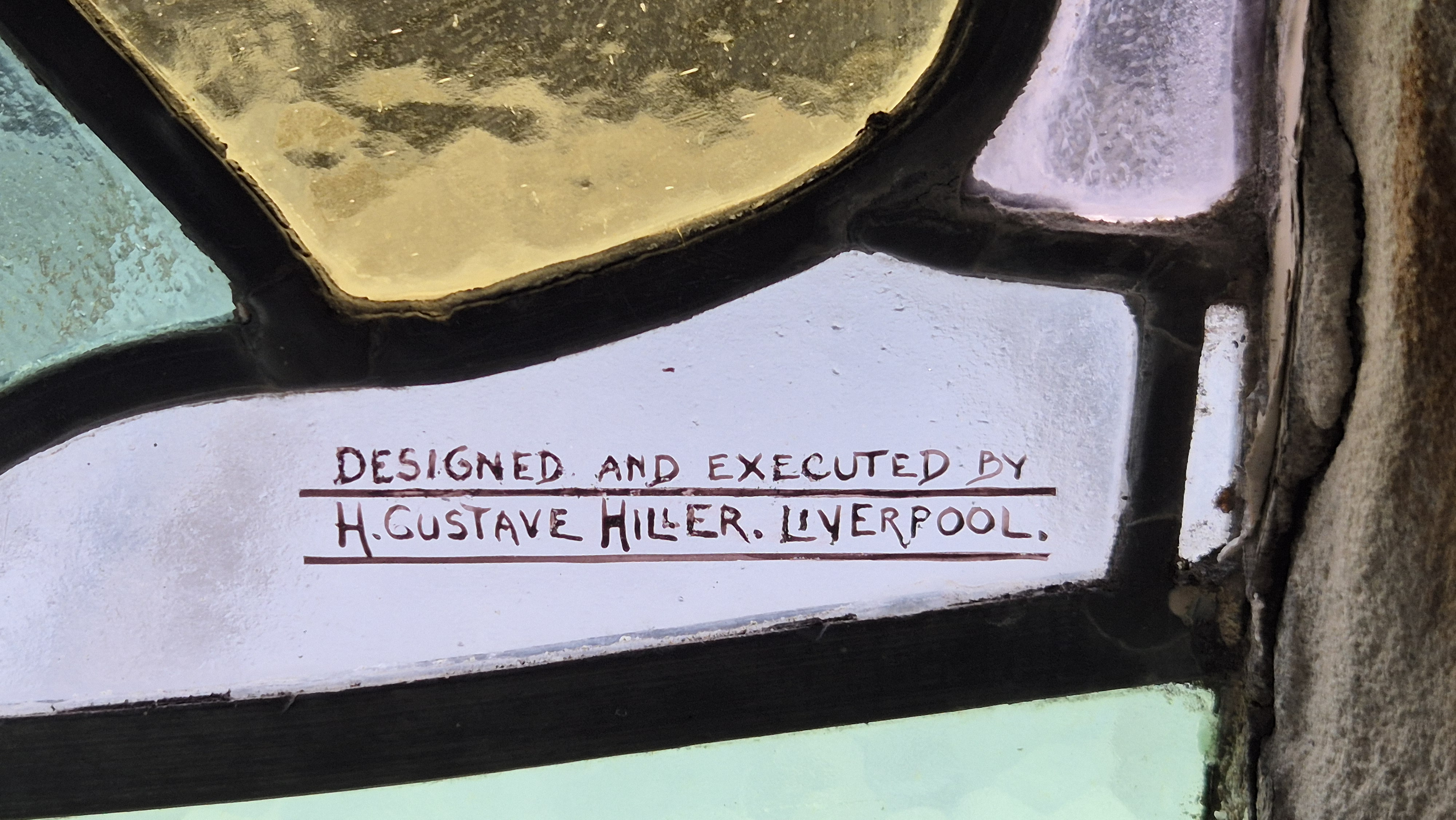
Signature of Gustave Hiller on staircase window at Blundellsands Classic, Crosby, Liverpool

== Works ==
=== Stained glass ===
Hiller’s ecclesiastical stained glass was notable for its bright colours and bold, but intricate, designs. Designs were frequently biblical narratives with particular attention to accurate depictions of plants, birds and animals, reflecting his interest in natural history. Biological accuracy were sometimes enhanced by detailed overpainting of the stained glass. He produced several windows commissioned as memorials to the fallen of World War I, which were notably more somber and rectilinear in style, and a considerable amount of commercial decorative work, which was loosely art nouveau in style.

=== Natural history ===
Hiller gave many talks to natural history societies including the Lancashire and Cheshire Entomological Society and the Liverpool Naturalists’ Field Club which he illustrated using lantern slides of his watercolours of specimens and watercolours of microscope slides. Many of these watercolours and drawings were purchased by the Liverpool Public Museums after Hiller’s retirement and are now held by the World Museum Liverpool.

Hiller maintained a keen interest in microscopy, entomology, arachnology and phycology. He collected, preserved and drew algal specimens, at least 68 sheets of which are stored at the National Museum Liverpool. His drawings of fresh specimens of algae are valuable in interpreting the structure of accompanying preserved specimens. Acccession numbers LIV 1974.38.

== Gallery ==
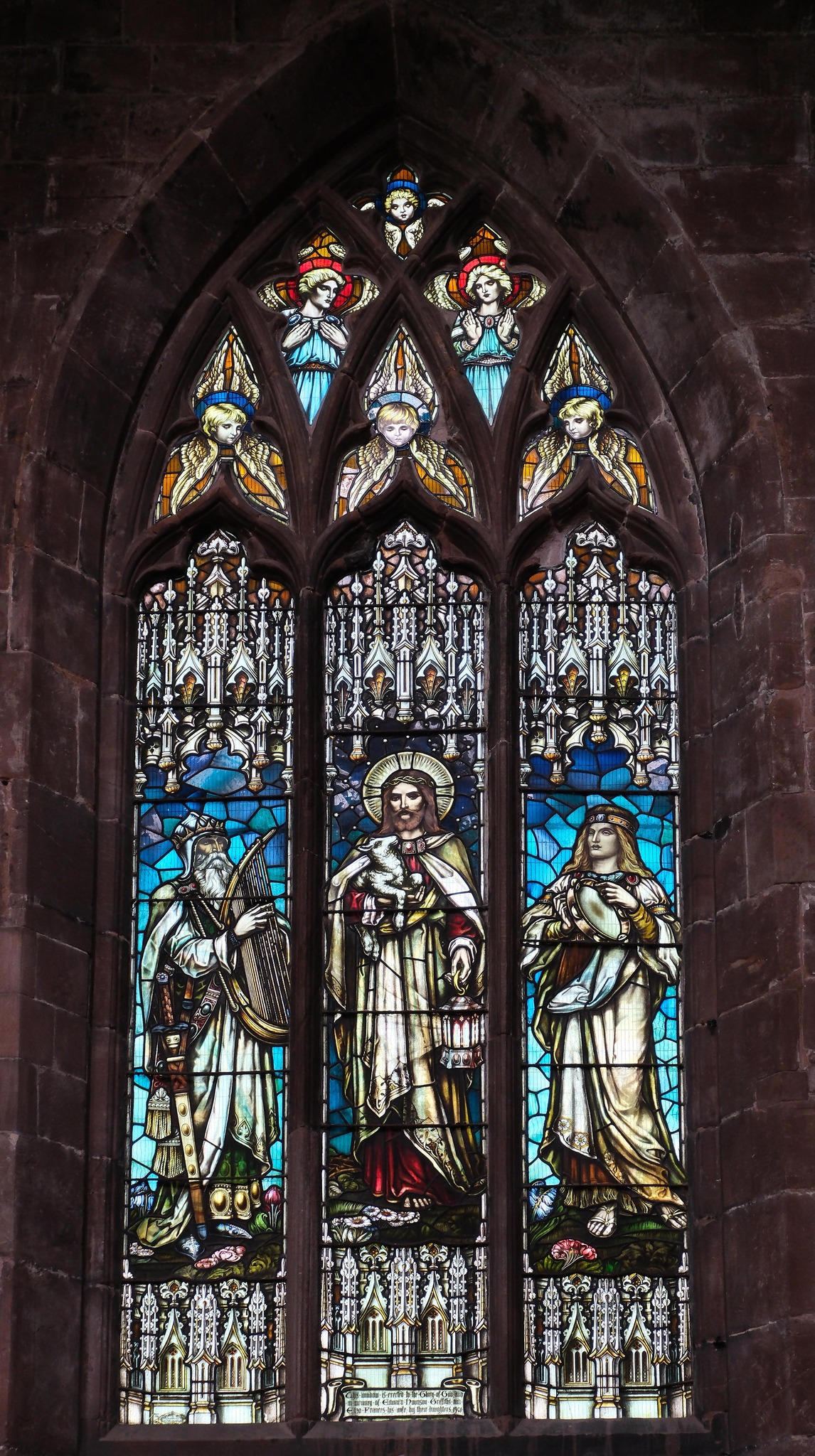
Window by Gustave Hiller and Reuben Bennett in St Mary's Church, Nantwich, Cheshire.

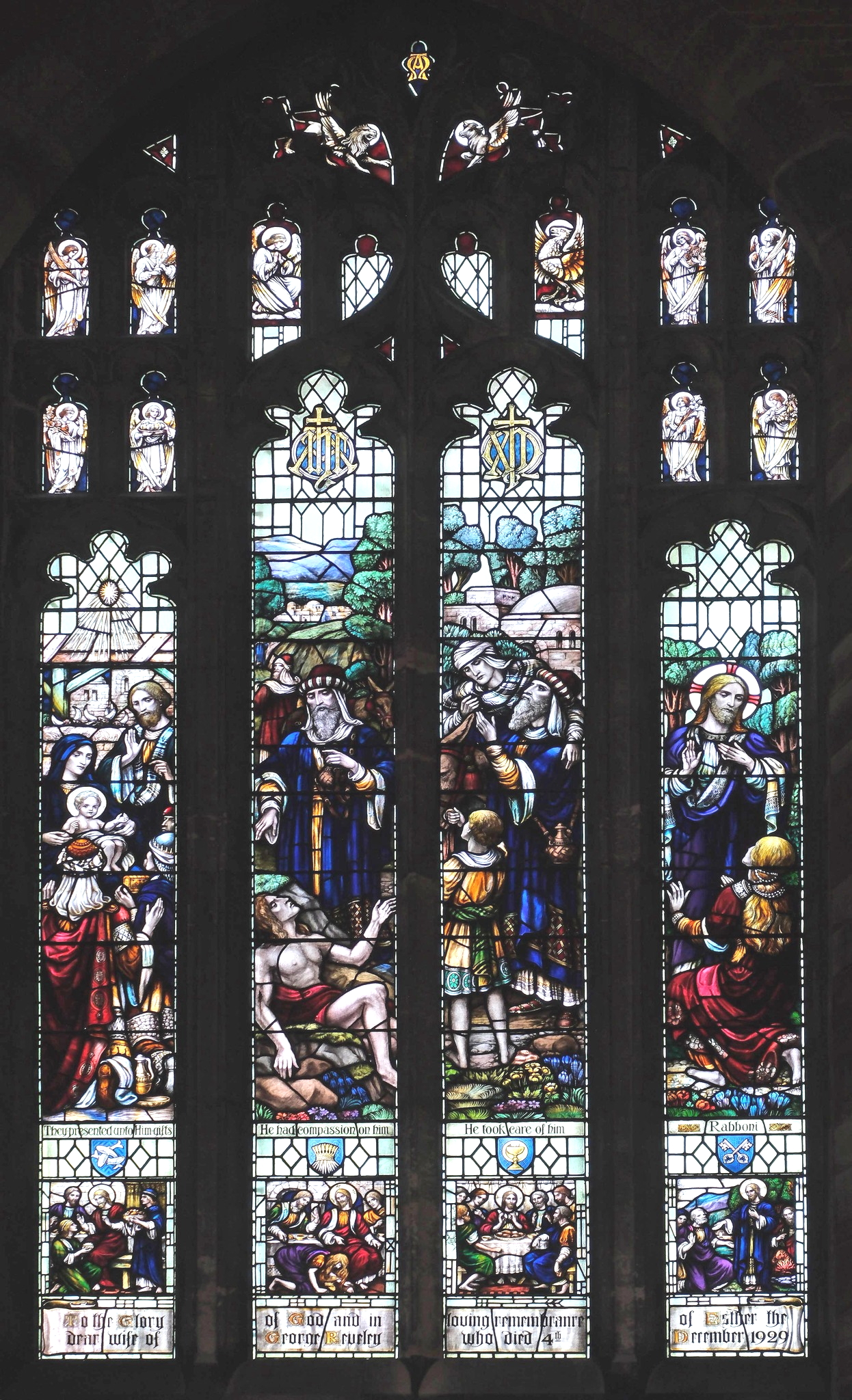
Window by Gustave Hiller in Holy Trinity Church, Southport, Lancashire.

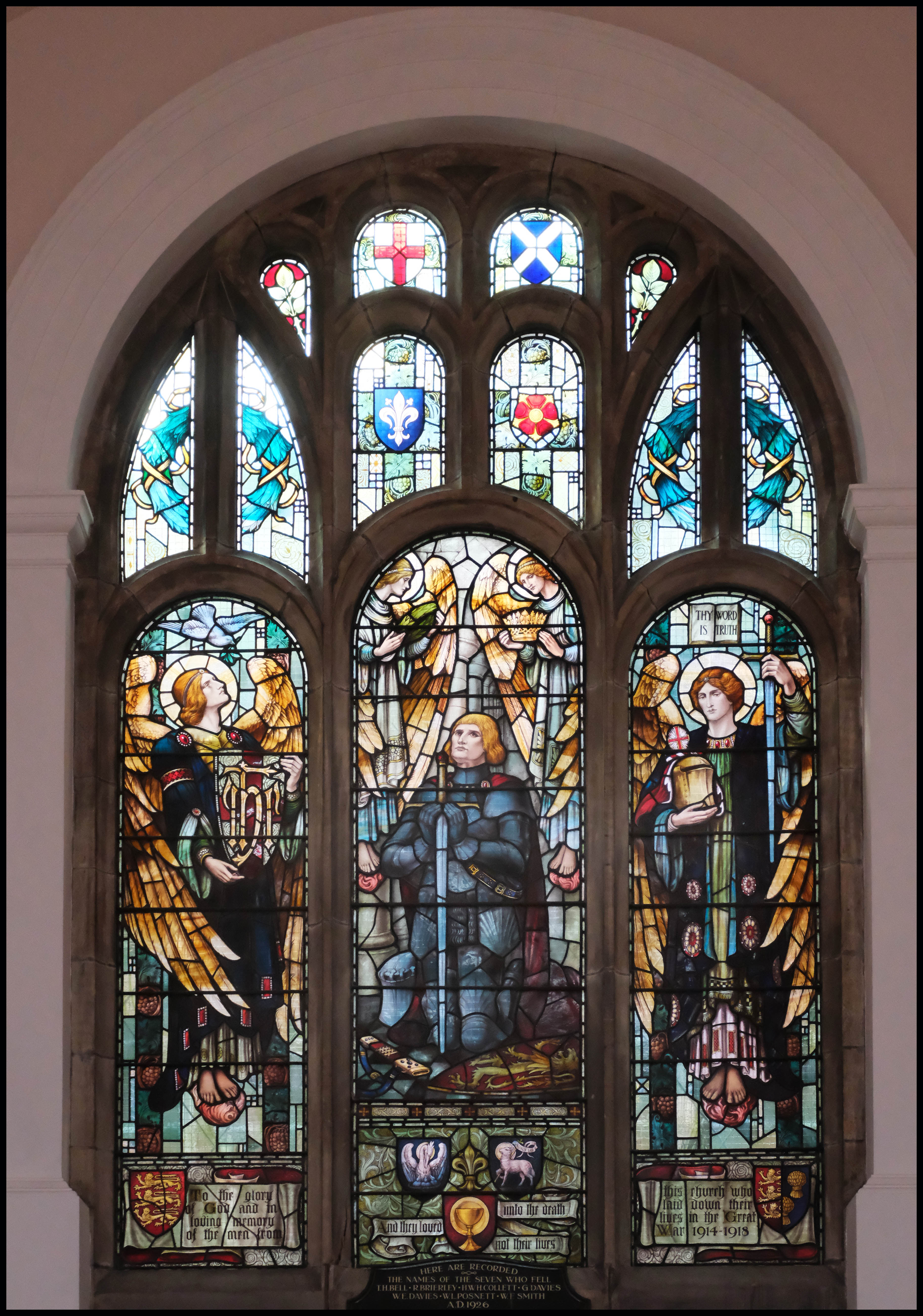
Window by Gustave Hiller in Wesley Church Centre, Chester, Cheshire.

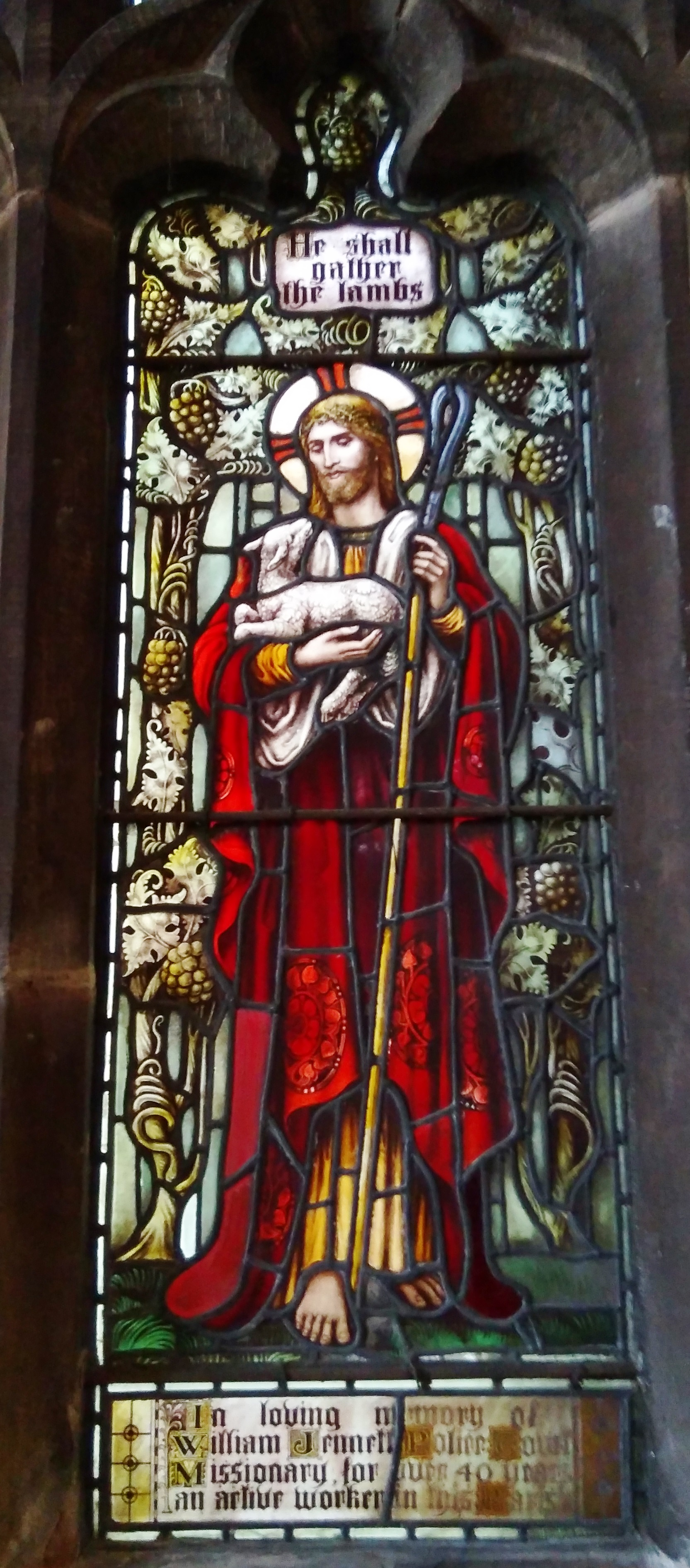
Window by Gustave Hiller in St Mary's Church, West Bank, Widnes.

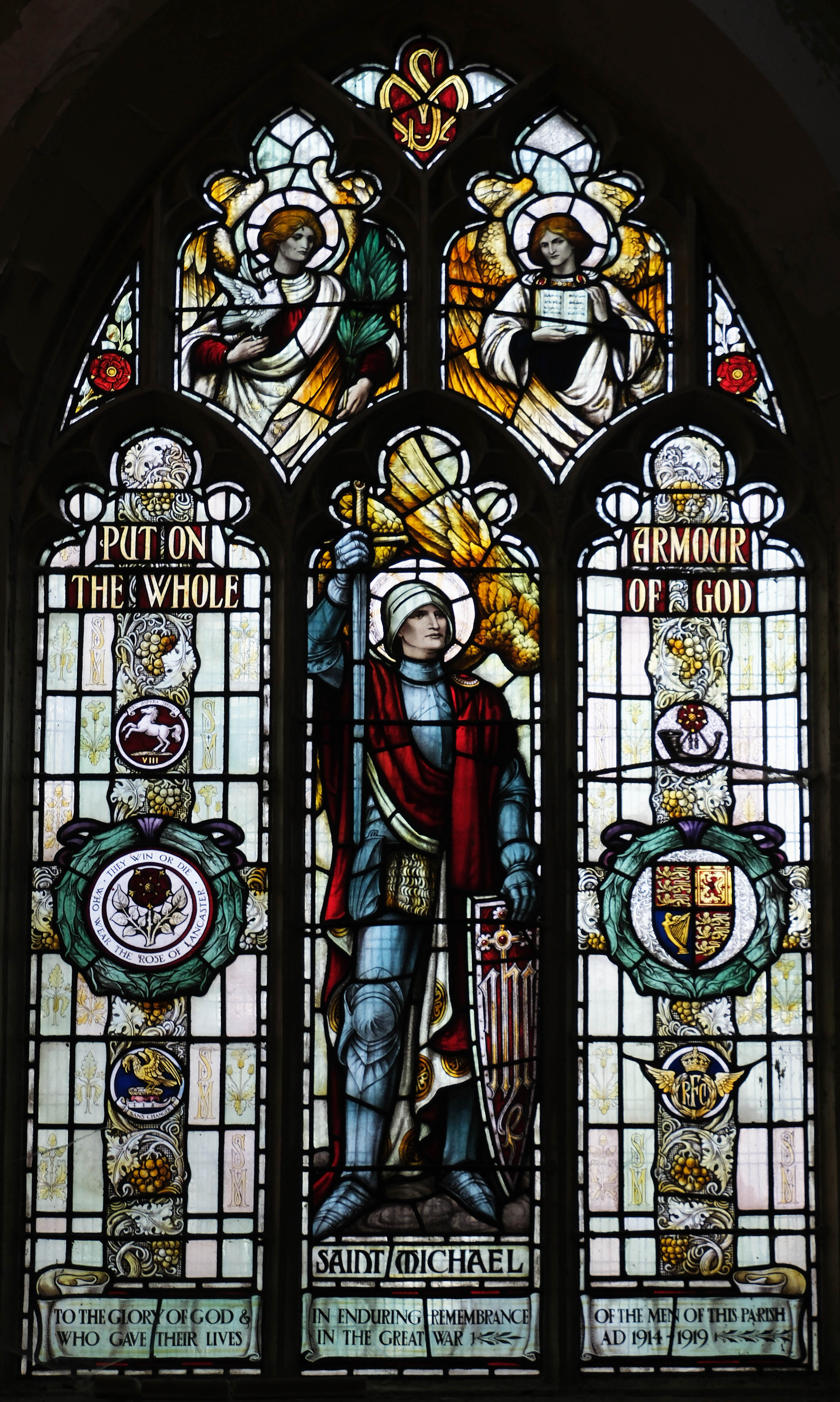
Window by Gustave Hiller in St Michael's Church, Aigburth, Liverpool.

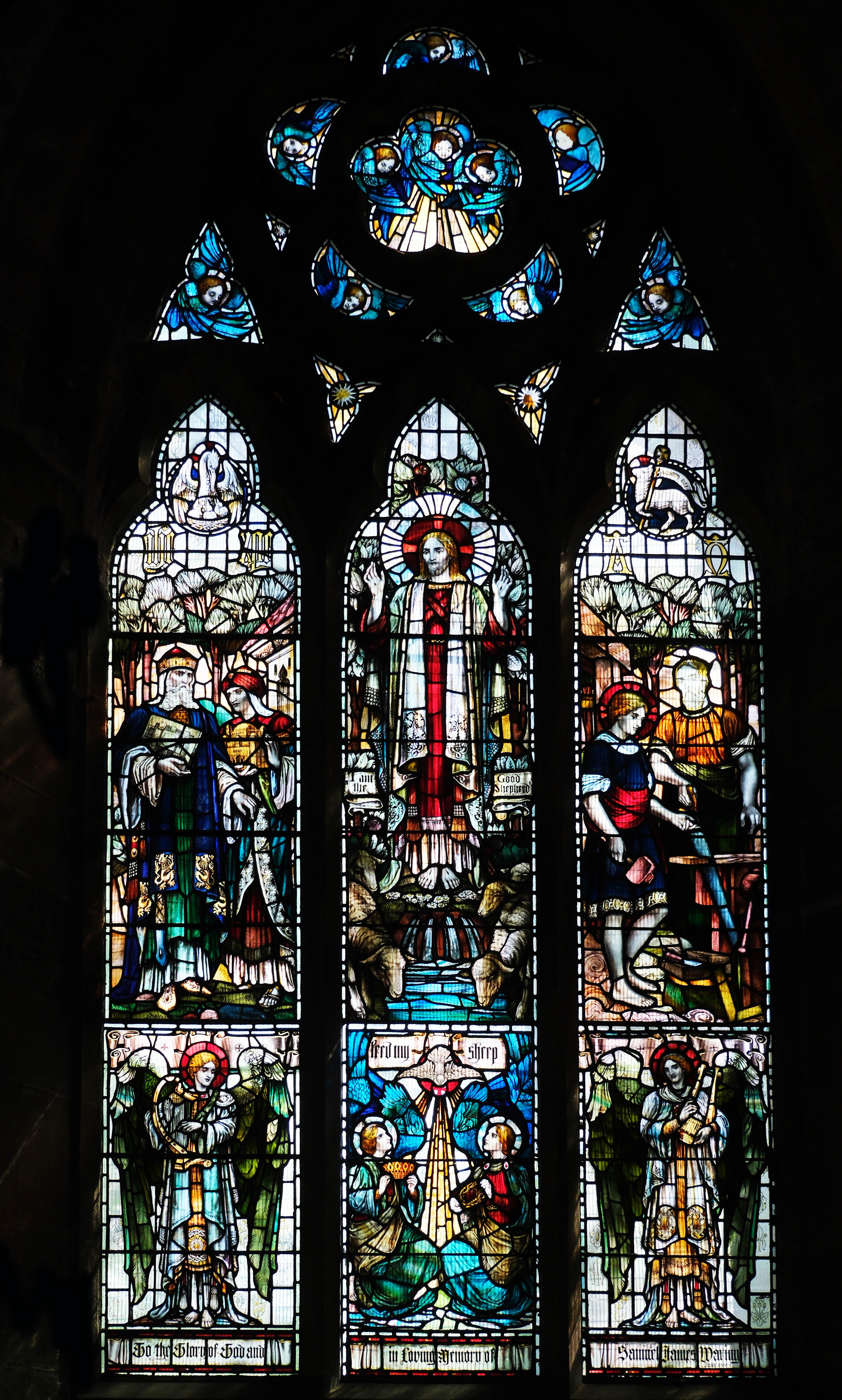
Window by Gustave Hiller in Christ Church, Toxteth, Liverpool in memory of Samuel James Waring (senior)

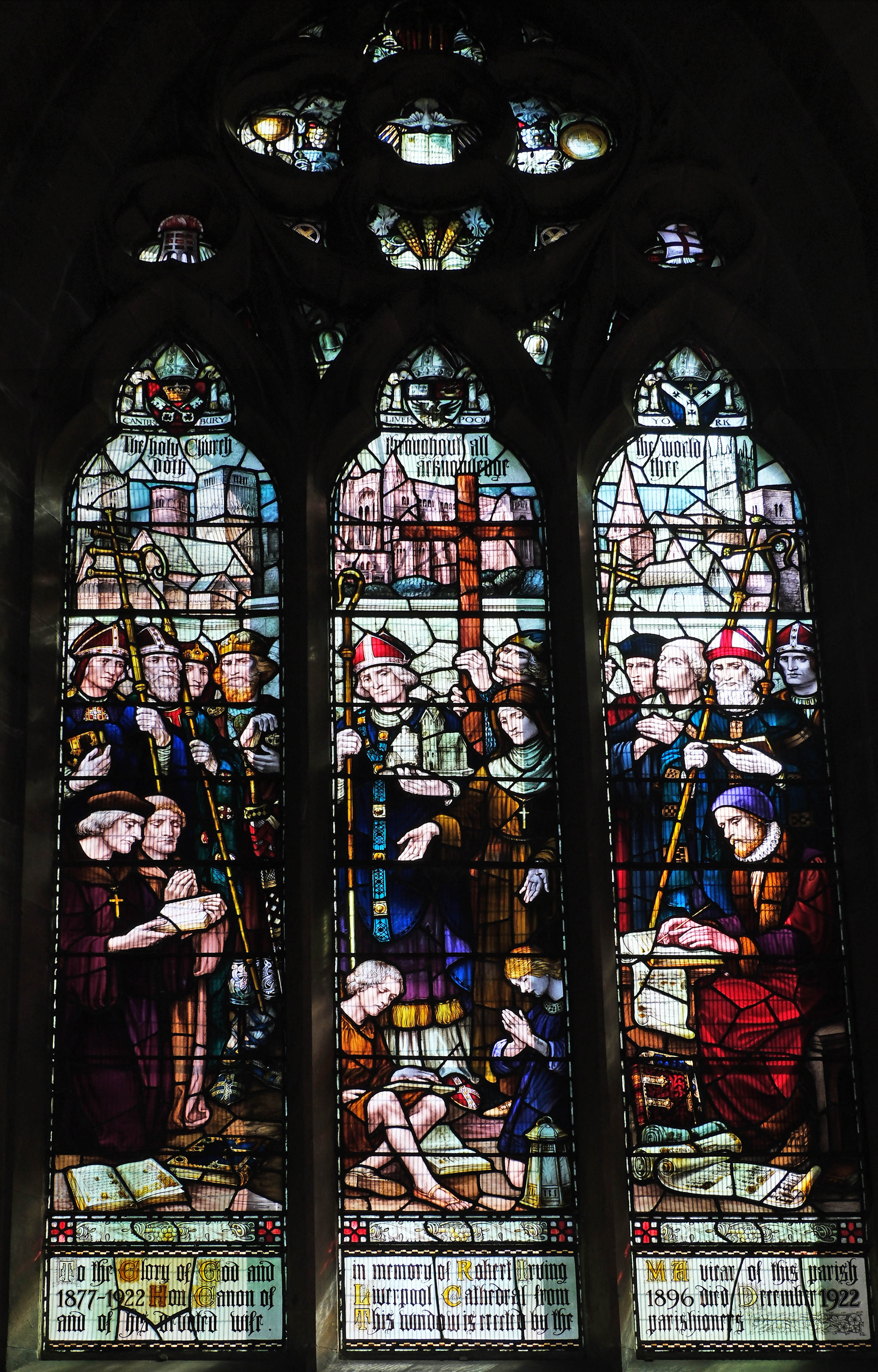
Window by Gustave Hiller in Christ Church, Toxteth, Liverpool in memory of Robert Irving.

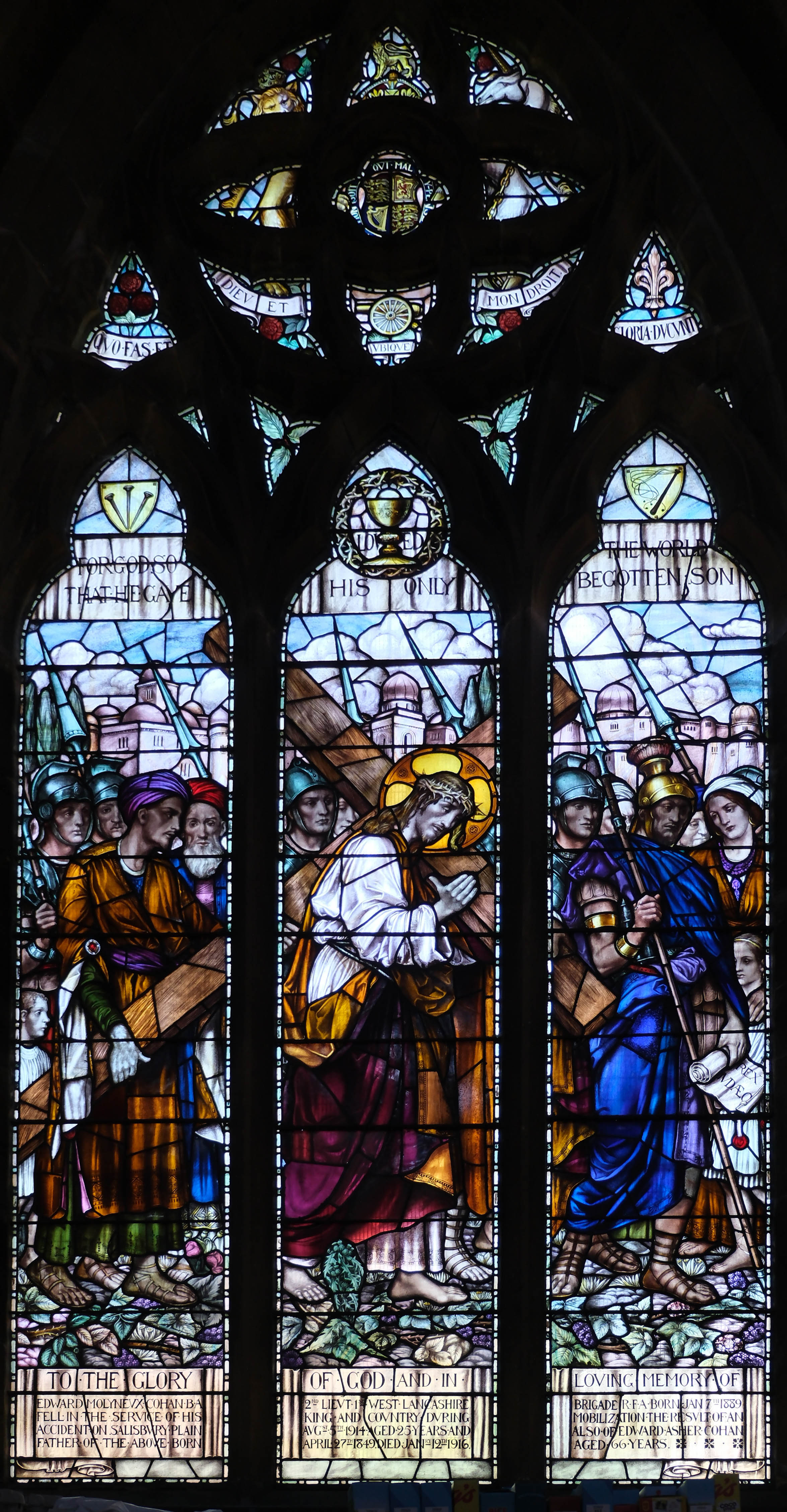
Window made by Gustave Hiller, designed by May L G Cooksey, in Christ Church, Toxteth, Liverpool.

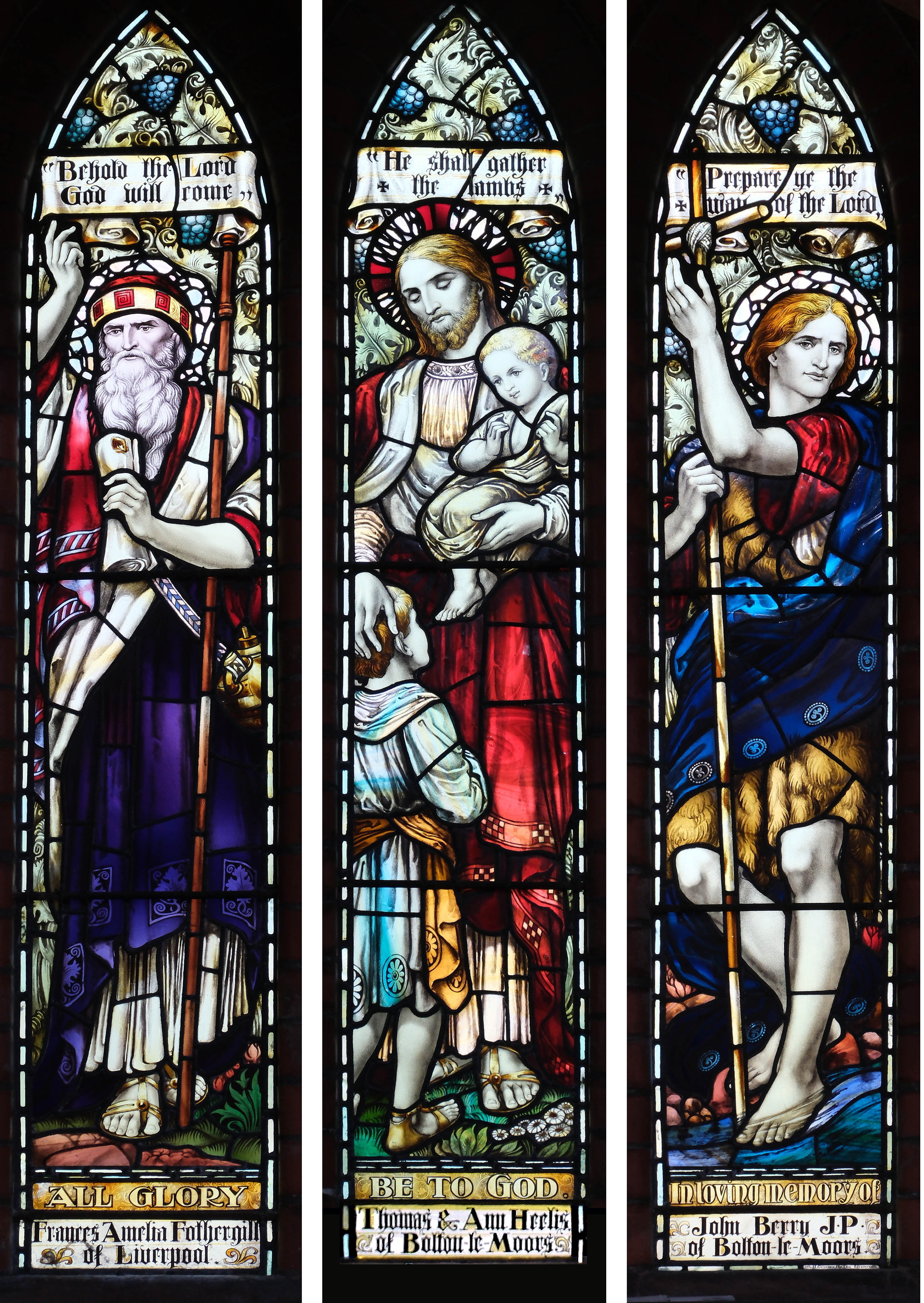
Three windows by Gustave Hiller in Bapistry of St John the Baptist Church Meols, Wirral, one signed in glass.

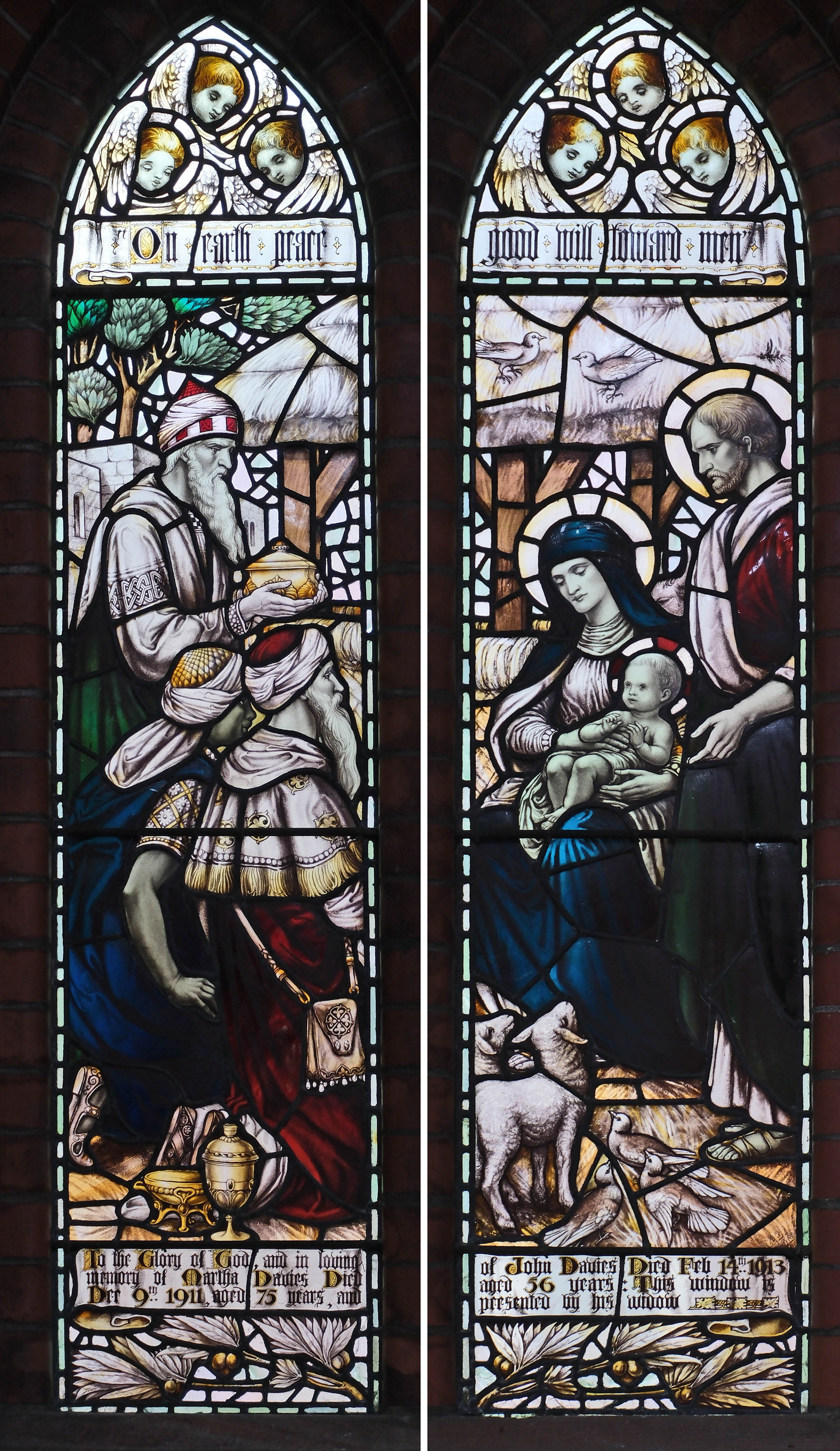
Two windows by Gustave Hiller in St John the Baptist Church, Meols, Wirral

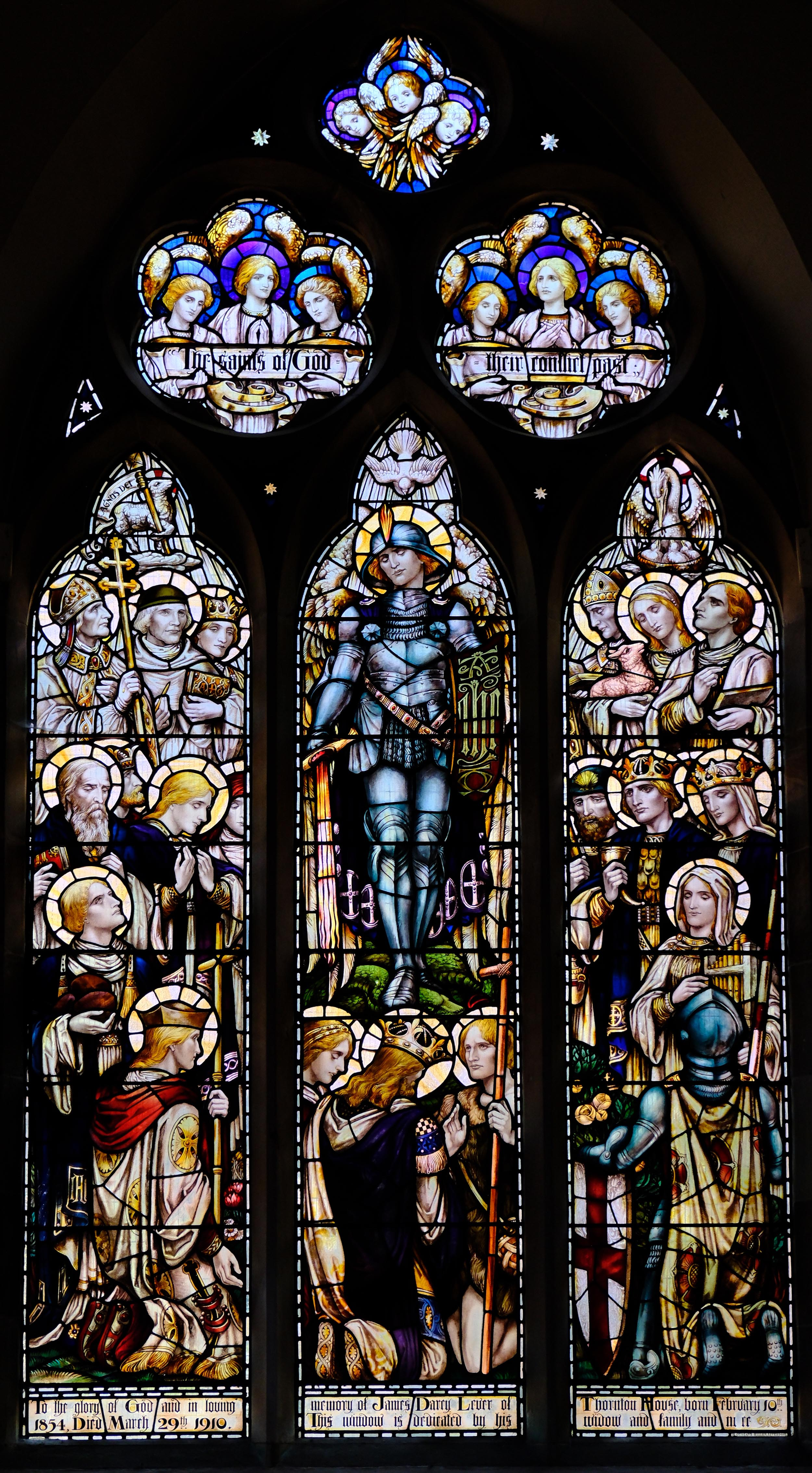
Window by Gustave Hiller in All Saint's Church, Thornton Hough, Wirral.

=== Locations of stained glass ===
Secular buildings

- Blundellsands Classic Hotel (now apartments). 1900. Staircase window with peacocks.
- Leigh Town Hall, Leigh, Greater Manchester. 1908. Window in stairwell showing heraldic motifs of local landlords. Large window in Council Chamber showing figures representing Commerce Education, Weaving, Spinning, Engineering and Mining.
- Accrington Library, Accrington, Lancashire. 1909. Large window in staircase depicting Knowledge holding a Lamp.
- Banqueting Hall, Bradford Town Hall. 1909. Windows depicting ~100 heraldic shields.
- Ceiriog Memorial Institute, Glyn Ceiriog, 1911. North Wales. Window in the gable end commemorating John Ceiriog Hughes.

Memorials to World War I in England and Wales

- St Michael's Church, Aigburth, Liverpool. Window in the porch. Signature in glass
- St Barnabas' Church, Mossley Hill, Liverpool. East window with figures in Contemporary uniforms. Attribution
- St Bridget's Church, Bagot Street, Wavertree, Liverpool. Window in Baptistry.
- St Marcella's Church, Llanfarchell, Denbigh, Denbighshire, Wales. 1918. Scenes from the time after the Resurrection. Signature in glass.
- St. Stephen's Church, Kearsley, Manchester. 1920.
- St Ambrose Church, Widnes. Two lancets of east window depicting St George and St Ambrose.
- St Llwchaiarn, Llanllwchaiarn, Powys, Wales.Two windows depicting St Gabriel and St Michael (1920) Signature in glass and Faith and Charity (1927). Signature in glass.
- Wesley Church Centre, Chester. 1926. Memorial window to church members who fell in World War I.
- St John the Baptist Church, Burscough, Ormskirk. >1919. East window with figures in contemporary uniforms. Attribution

Churches in England

- St Mary's Church, Nantwich. 1901. Window depicting The Good Shepherd with David and Miriam. Signatures of Hiller and Bennett in glass.
- St Thomas' Church, Werneth, Oldham. 1911. Baptistery windows depicting Cardinal Virtues.
- Christ Church, Linnet Lane, Liverpool. 1917. Two windows in the south aisle. One in the north aisle made by Gustave Hiller, but designed by May L. G. Cooksey.
- St John the Evangelist, Walton-on-the-Hill, Liverpool. >1918. Window depicting the Annunciation. Memorial to 'Agnes Helen Barlow ...in 1918'
- St John's Church, Tottington, Greater Manchester. Windows in the chancel depicting Faith, Hope, Love and Duty.
- St Stephen's Church, Hutton, Cumbria. Window depicting Christ the Good Shepherd, in memory of Queen Victoria.
- St. Mary's Church, West Bank, Widnes. Lady Chapel. Stained glass memorial window depicting Jesus, The Good Shepherd.
- St. Paul's Church, New Cross, Manchester. (Demolished 1985). Five light east window, now in the Stained Glass Museum, Ely. cat.no. ELYGM 1982.16
- Holy Trinity Church, Southport. North nave. 1929. Window depicting Adoration of the Magi, the Good Samaritan and the Risen Christ.
- St Nicholas' Church, West Tanfield. Three adjacent windows depicting The Parable of the Good Samaritan.
- St Helen's Church, Sefton. 1936. A series of windows in the south chapel.
- Roedean School Chapel. Brighton. Window in the south nave on the subject Suffer the Little Children. Signature in glass.

Churches in Wirral, England

- All Saints Church, Thornton Hough, Wirral. 1912. Window depicting St. Michael the Archangel with other saints; memorial to James Darcy Lever, brother of William Lever. Signature in glass.
- Manor Church Centre (permanently closed), Egremont, Wallasey. Window depicting the Empty Tomb.
- St John the Baptist's Church, Meols. 1913. Windows in the baptistry and north aisle.
- St Oswald's Church, Bidston, Birkenhead. Window in south aisle.
- Congregational Church, Hoylake, Wirral. (Now Hope Church) 1922. East window depicting the Nativity, Resurrection and Ascension. Signature in glass.

Churches in Wales

- St Peter, Llanbedr-y-Cennin, Conwy. 1907. Window depicting The Good Shepherd. Signature in glass.
- St Sannan's Church, Llansannan, Conwy. 1910. Window depicting Christ with St Sannan and St David. Signature in glass.
- St Llwchaiarn's Church, Llanllwchaiarn, Powys. 1920. Windows depicting St Gabriel and St Michael, with signature and 1927 Window depicting Angels with Sacred Heraldry, with signature
- All Saints Church, Deganwy, Conwy. 1934. Window depicting St David and St Martin, with signature
- St Michael's Church, Caerwys, Flintshire. 1937. Two light window depicting The Annunciation, attributed to Hiller. Compare to watercolour in Walker Art Gallery (see below) and window in St John the Evangelist Church, Walton-on-the-Hill, Liverpool (see above)

=== Other works ===
- The Vines Big house, Lime Street, Liverpool. 1907. Plaster reliefs and frosted glass windows.
- Liverpool Museum. Illustrations of Anglesey seaweeds.
- Walker Art Gallery. <1926. Watercolour design for stained glass window
- Manchester School of Art Collection. Manchester Metropolitan University. ~1900. Window depicting St John of Beverley.
- St Peter and St Paul Church, Marlborough, Wiltshire. Carved reredos

== See also ==
- Selection of stained glass by Gustave Hiller.
- Several works by Hiller are shown in Armstrong, B; Armstrong, W. "The Arts and Crafts Movement in the North West of England")
