= Accrington Town Hall =

Municipal building in Lancashire, England

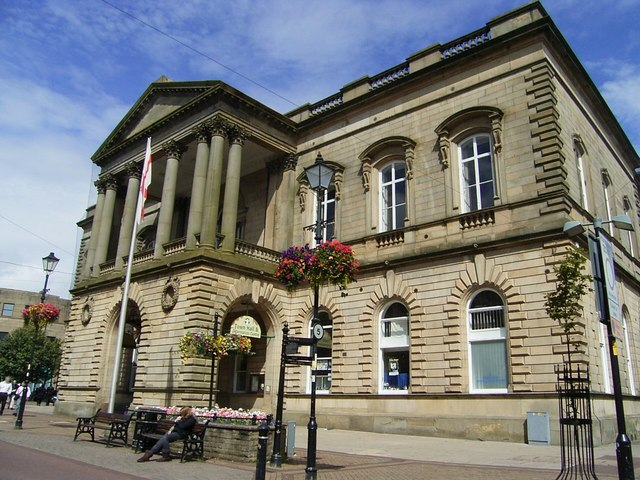
- Accrington Town Hall

- Shown in Lancashire Location in Borough of Hyndburn
- 53.7532°N 2.3653°W
- Location: Blackburn Road, Accrington

History
- Built: 1858

Site notes
- Architect(s): James F. Green and T. Birtwhistle
- Architectural style: Neoclassical style

Listed Building – Grade II*
- Official name: Town Hall
- Designated: 9 March 1984
- Reference no.: 1362011

Accrington Town Hall is a municipal building on Blackburn Road in Accrington, Lancashire, England. The town hall, which was the headquarters of Accrington Borough Council, is a Grade II* listed building.

== History ==
The building was originally commissioned as an assembly hall to commemorate the life of the former Prime Minister, Sir Robert Peel. The cost of construction was funded by a campaign of public subscription led by a local businessman, Benjamin Hargreaves of Arden Hall.

The new building was designed by James F. Green and T. Birtwhistle in the neoclassical style, built in ashlar stone and opened as the "Peel Institute" in 1858. The design involved a symmetrical main frontage with seven bays facing onto Blackburn Road; the central section, which projected forward, featured a porte-cochère supporting a balustrade and a hexastyle portico with Corinthian order columns on the first floor with a pediment above. Internally, the principal room was the assembly hall on the first floor. The assembly hall also accommodated meetings of the local mechanics institute.

The building was acquired by the local board of health in 1864 and the area became a municipal borough with the town hall as its headquarters in 1878. The Accrington Pals Battalion of the East Lancashire Regiment was formally raised by the mayor, Councillor John Harwood, inside the town hall in September 1914; the battalion subsequently marched past the building before preparing to deploy, initially to Egypt and then to the Western Front, during the First World War.

The town hall continued to serve as the headquarters of the borough council for much of the 20th century and remained a meeting place for the enlarged Hyndburn Borough Council which was formed in 1974. Many of the council officers and their departments were based at Eagle House before moving to Scaitcliffe House, the former canteen for textile machinery manufacturers, Howard & Bullough, in June 2002. Whilst Scaitcliffe House is used for Hyndburn's committee meetings, full council meetings are still held at the town hall.

A new town square was created in front of the town hall and market hall, to commemorate the lives of the Accrington Pals, in 2017. The scheme involved the removal of a series of trees, which had been planted outside the town hall and market hall in 1962, and the installation of new paving, seating and signage recording the history of the Accrington Pals, Accrington Stanley F.C. and the impact of the Industrial Revolution on the town.

== See also ==
- Grade II* listed buildings in Lancashire
- Listed buildings in Accrington
