= Baxenden =

Village and ward in the Borough of Hyndburn in Lancashire, North-West England

Coordinates: 53.734°N 2.341°W

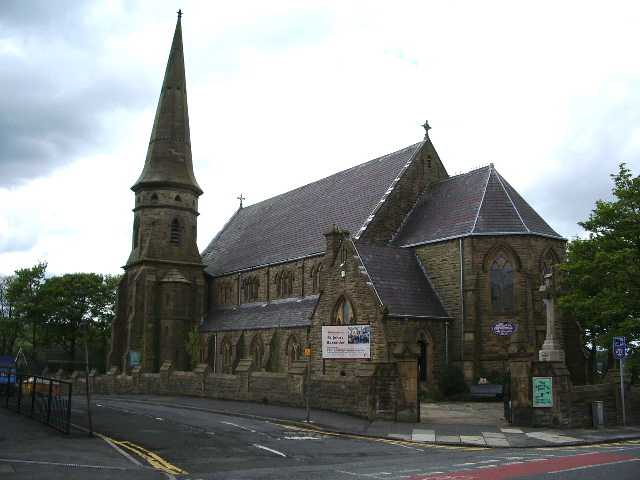
- St John's Church

- Location within Hyndburn Location within Lancashire
- Population: 4,042 (2011.Ward)
- OS grid reference: SD774265
- District: Hyndburn
- Shire county: Lancashire
- Region: North West
- Country: England
- Sovereign state: United Kingdom
- Post town: ACCRINGTON
- Postcode district: BB5
- Dialling code: 01254
- Police: Lancashire
- Fire: Lancashire
- Ambulance: North West
- UK Parliament: Hyndburn

Baxenden is a village and ward in the Borough of Hyndburn in Lancashire, North-West England. The ward population taken at the 2011 census was 4,042.

== History ==
Whilst people have inhabited the site for centuries, most of the village dates from the Victorian-Edwardian periods or is more recent.

Historically a part of the Blackburn Hundred the first record of Baxenden appears in 1194 as the site of a vaccary subject to Kirkstall Abbey. In the records Baxenden appears under the name Bastanedenecloch likely meaning valley where baking stones are found from the Old English bæc-stan meaning baking stone denu meaning valley (see dale) and clōh meaning ravine (in Northern Middle English clōh evolved into cloghe which has survived in a number of local place names as clough). By 1305 in the records of the de Lacy family the name of Baxenden had evolved to Bakestonden where records show 12s 2d were spent transporting seven loads of lead from Baxenden to Bradford. The lead mine closing as late as 1780. By 1494 the name had evolved to Baxtonden.

Local families of historic significance are the Cunliffes of Hollins, Holdens, Hargreaves & Kenyons.

Historically farming was the main occupation of the residents of Baxenden. Development of the area began during the Industrial Revolution. The current road through the area was the last road built by Blind Jack Metcalf o' Knaresborough and was completed in 1791 with the old road becoming what is now known as Back Lane and Hollins Lane. It was one of the most challenging roads that he built and he made a loss of £40 on a contract worth £3,500. Alongside this road print works, mills and coal mines developed which led to the need for greater housing in the area and the associated services needed.

The surnames Baxendale and Baxenden originate from this village.

== Governance ==
The village is part of the constituency of Hyndburn and is represented in Parliament by the Labour MP Sarah Smith. It is represented in Hyndburn borough council by two Conservative councillors. Hyndburn borough council devolves some limited powers and funding to the Baxenden Area Council for resolving minor local issues.

== Geography ==
Baxenden lies south of Accrington on the A680 otherwise known as Manchester Road. It is between 200m at its northern edge and 280m at its southern edge above sea level. It is sited in a wedge shaped valley between Hameldon Hill and Oswaldtwistle Moor. Hameldon means scarred hill. Oswaldtwistle Moor is a part of the West Pennine Moors. The valley presumably being carved out by the streams which flow through the area. These streams, Warmden Brook and Woodnook Water, merge beneath Accrington and are tributaries of the River Hyndburn; itself a tributary of the Rivers Calder and then Ribble.

== Notable facts ==
Baxenden is the home of Holland's Pies.

== Transport ==
=== Train ===
Baxenden was once served by Baxenden railway station however this was closed in 1951 before the lines themselves were removed in 1970–71 as recommended by the Beeching Axe. This line was once notorious as one of the most difficult in the country due to its 'alpine' nature involving a climb from the junction at Stubbins railway station for 5 miles at an average of 1 in 78 to a summit in Baxenden at 771 feet above sea level followed by a 2 and a quarter mile drop down Baxenden Bank, at times as steep as 1 in 38/40. Nowadays 'the lines' as they are known is a footpath which has been recently incorporated into a network of paths that lead throughout the borough.

=== Bus ===
As of March 2026 buses are run by Blackburn Bus Company. The first route is The 464 to Rochdale or Accrington. The second route is the X41 Red Express to Manchester or Accrington.

== Education ==
Baxenden has one primary school; St John's Primary built in 1880 to replace a school built in the 1833 sited near the modern junction of Manchester Road with Southwood Drive, and one high school; The Hollins.

== Religious sites ==
There were two churches in Baxenden. St John the Baptist Church founded in 1875, site of the war memorial, and Baxenden Methodist Church, which closed in 2013. The modern vicarage, built in 1977, stands on the site of the old Baxenden House and the Baxenden vaccary of Henry de Lacy, Baron of Pontefract.

== See also ==
- Listed buildings in Accrington
