= Martin Clarke =

Martin Clarke may refer to:

- Martin Clarke (journalist) (born 1964 or 1965), British journalist
- Marty Clarke (basketball) (born 1967), Australian basketball player and coach
- Martin Clarke (footballer) (born 1987), Gaelic and Australian rules footballer

== See also ==
- Martin Clark (disambiguation)
