= Accrington Library =

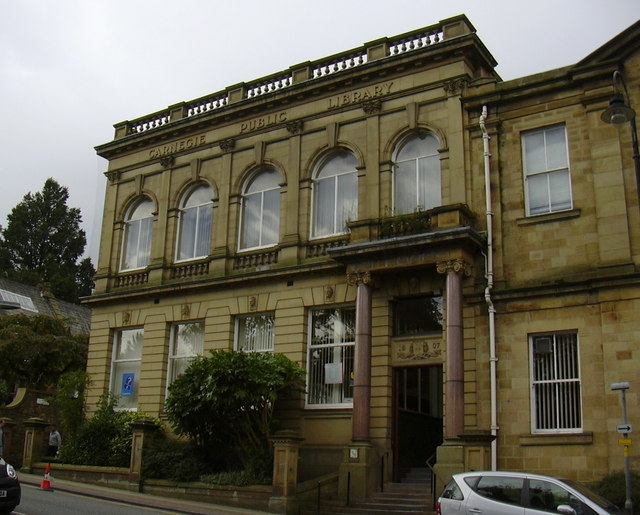
- Carnegie Library Accrington, 2008
- Interactive map of the Accrington Library area

General information
- Type: Library
- Architectural style: Renaissance
- Location: St James' Street, Accrington, Lancashire, England
- Coordinates: 53.752522°N 2.366329°W
- Opened: 18 January 1908

Design and construction
- Architect: William J. Newton

Listed Building – Grade II
- Official name: Carnegie Public Library
- Designated: 9 March 1984
- Reference no.: 1280524

Accrington Library is a Carnegie library located in the town of Accrington, Lancashire.

In 1904 a sum of £7,500 was offered to the town by the industrialist and philanthropist Andrew Carnegie for the building of a new library. Following an application for more funds this offer was increased to £10,000. The building itself was opened in January 1908. It was managed by Accrington Council until 1974 when this role was taken on by Lancashire County Council The building had a complete electrical rewire in the early 1980’s by a Nelson based company called Spencer Cuttell. It was a huge task lasting several months.

== The development, opening and early years of the building ==
The Public Libraries Acts were adopted during a meeting of the Town Council on 5 June 1899 following a bequest of £500 by Mr John Edgar Stansfield. The first Library Committee was appointed on 9 November of that year. The Lending Library was opened in part of the building occupied by the Directors of the Mechanics' Institution.

Andrew Carnegie's offer of £7,500 of funding for a new library came in 1904 following representations made to him, and this was increased to £10,000. The building, built and designed by the Borough Engineer William Newton, was opened on 18 January 1908 by Alderman T. E. Higham. The design incorporates features which are standard in a Carnegie library, such as the raised entrance, the steps symbolising the reader's spiritual elevation. A souvenir brochure was produced which highlights other features, including the large stained glass window by H. Gustave Hiller of Liverpool "which has been designed not only to be effective as a work of art but also to give light to the building".

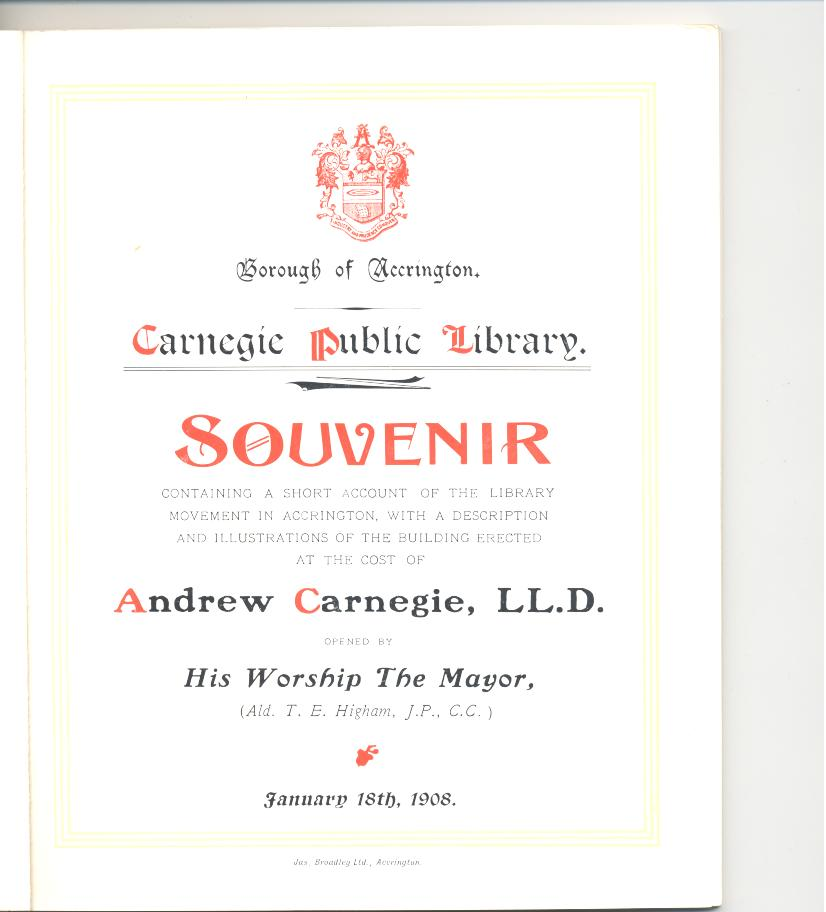
Opening of Accrington Library - Souvenir Brochure, 18 January 1908

The ground floor contained a reading room, children's room and lending department; the first floor housed the reference library, librarian's office and a lecture Room which could hold 500 people. Several gifts of books had been made including the 4,000 volume library of William Ashworth and the Mechanics' Institution Library of 5,000 volumes.

The souvenir brochure explained that the 'Safe guarded open access' system used in the previous library premises was to be maintained and that there were 11,000 volumes available to the public in the lending library as well as 2,000 volumes in the children's library. The library also worked with the Blind Society to provide volumes, presumably in Braille. It was acknowledged that there was a weakness in reference provision but it was hoped that the Library Committee would allocate enough funds each year to rectify this.

== Readers ==
Readers have included the writer Jeanette Winterson, who grew up in Accrington.
