= Andy Kanavan =

English musician (born 1961)

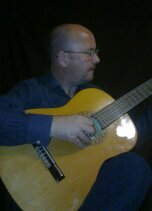
- Andy Kanavan
- Born: 23 May 1961 (age 65); Huncoat, Accrington, England
- Occupation: Multi-instrumentalist
- Years active: 1974–present
- Musical career
- Genres: Progressive rock; psychedelic rock; art rock

Andy Kanavan (born 23 May 1961) is an English classical musician, composer and multi-instrumentalist. He was best known for his work with post-punk bands Level 9, Foreign Playground and German band Styffe. Kanavan also played briefly with Killing Joke, Enigma, The Maisonettes, The Alan Parsons Project and Dire Straits. He was recognized as a capable drummer, as showcased in concerts such as Larks in the Park. He was also a founding member of Mellow Yellow.

A session musician, Kanavan drummed for Decca, Polydor and indie label Sabre, and became the drummer for the band Dream Cast on their ill-fated European tour, in which Dave Elliott (guitar), Chris Nichols (keyboards) and Helen Raven (vocals) died in a horrific traffic accident.

Born in Accrington, the former Royal Marine Officer built a reputation for his aggressive and rhythmic style of drumming. As a rock and soul drummer for bands both in Europe and the UK, Kanavan was never short of work. Following his brief spell of notoriety, Kanavan stepped away from the limelight in the early 1980s and began a new life as a music tutor in the South of England.

Following the death of his wife on 11 August 1989, Blue Haze vocalist Barbara Mac, he lost his love of music. He would fail to show at concerts and was soon dropped by mainstream record labels and bands.

In 2024 Kanavan returned to music reforming The Blue Haze Project and also with Hour Glass.

Kanavan is also composing classical music under his own name as showcased by the BBC.

Kanavan has made several appearances with The Blue Haze Project & Hour Glass in and around Edinburgh and Stirling.

Kanavan created a music recording studio that was dissolved by mutual agreement in 2024, however, he has since reopened Happy Apple Studio

== Band history ==
Foreign Playground was founded by Kanavan and Hamilton and although found moderate success with the single "Would You" in Japan, the song failed to enter the UK singles chart. Panned by critics, the band released "Love in the Woods" which saw the band's popularity rise in Germany and Italy. His clashes with other band members sealed the fate of the band. In 1983, the band parted company.
