= Anthony Rushton =

British tech entrepreneur

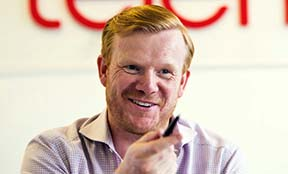
- Rushton in 2013.
- Born: 3 November 1971 (age 54); Accrington, England
- Education: University of York
- Occupations: Co-founder & CEO, Telemetry (2009-17)
- Years active: 2001–present

Anthony Rushton (born 3 November 1971) is a British tech entrepreneur and the co-founder and chief executive officer of Telemetry, an online video advertising security and optimisation firm.

== Early life ==
Rushton was born and raised in Accrington, Lancashire, England. Following his graduation from the University of York, where he earned a bachelor of arts in sociology and economic history, he briefly went into engineering before moving to London and working as a media planner and buyer in the late 1990s.

== Career ==
=== JailDog ===
In 2001, Rushton quit his advertising job to go into business with his software developer friends Russell Irwin and Beau Chesluk, who had helped create the Nintendo 64 video game GoldenEye 007 while working for game designer Rare. Rushton and his partners each put up £10,000 of their own money to help get the business off the ground. To raise additional funds, they began creating branded online video games under the name JailDog (also known as The JD Project), with Rushton serving as commercial director. JailDog earned notice in 2003 after winning the pitch to create the broadband version of the TV game show Who Wants to Be a Millionaire?

=== WeDigTV ===
In 2007, Rushton, Irwin and Chesluk launched the online TV station WeDigTV, which broadcast interactive programs that allowed viewers to alter the course of the show, winning a 2008 International Interactive Emmy Award for being the world's first such network. Rushton served as director. In 2007, the site reported 2.5 million unique monthly users, featuring content such as Who Wants To Be a Millionaire? and Deal or No Deal, with an interactive ad break every five to seven minutes. WeDigTV was a precursor to Telemetry, as the three partners pursued the growing market of online video advertising.

=== Telemetry ===
Rushton is co-founder and CEO of Telemetry, a London-based independent digital media forensics company, founded with Irwin and Chesluk in 2009. The company has offices in London and New York. Telemetry works with advertisers and agencies, providing impartial, detailed analytics in real time, tracking the efficiency and exposure gained by online digital advertising campaigns to ensure accountability: that the ads are properly delivered, are being viewed by the intended audience, alongside the proper content, and that reach and impressions are not being inflated. They have advised caution when it comes to much of the technology used for programmatic buying, which can, for instance, fail to report when ads intended for pre-roll have been placed into oft-muted banner video ads instead. In conceiving the service, Rushton drew on his prior experience as a media planner, where he observed that advertisers had to rely on partisan analytics from the vendor or traditional ad server statistics, which had not been designed to track online ad campaigns. In 2014, Telemetry investigated Verizon Wireless's online video ad purchases, finding that in excess of $1 million was spent on fake Web views. The company in turn demanded make-good ads. Also that year, Telemetry uncovered an ad fraud operation that had been skimming around $10 million in video ad revenue per month, affecting over 75 advertisers, including McDonald's, Coca-Cola and Ford. Rushton called it the most significant instance of ad fraud Telemetry has seen. Telemetry has publicly called out companies perpetrating such fraud by name. The Wall Street Journal reported in 2014 that approximately 36% of all Web traffic is considered fake, with the corresponding amount of ad views being seen by "bots" rather than people, cheating advertisers who pay based on the number of Web views. In August 2014, Rushton was interviewed by CNN about online advertising fraud moving away from bot fraud, in which a series of fake computers simulate a sentient being watching ads, to a type of fraud involving a genuine audience watching low-quality impressions, which are converted into premium inventory, with the fraudulent impressions sold to large advertisers. Rushton stated that he feels it is the responsibility of the vendors to ensure that the impressions they are trading are genuine impressions.

Customers include Reckitt Benckiser, Anheuser-Busch, Unilever, Verizon Wireless, L'Oreal and Mercedes-Benz. In 2012, Telemetry showed revenues of £24 million with adjusted profits of £5 million, and was valued at £175 million. Deloitte predicted Telemetry would be worth £486 million by 2014. In January 2017, Telemetry ceased its ad verification services, citing adverse market conditions.

== Honors and awards ==
- International Interactive Emmy Award, for WeDigTV, 2008
- Advertising Age Media Maven, 2014
