= The Hollins =

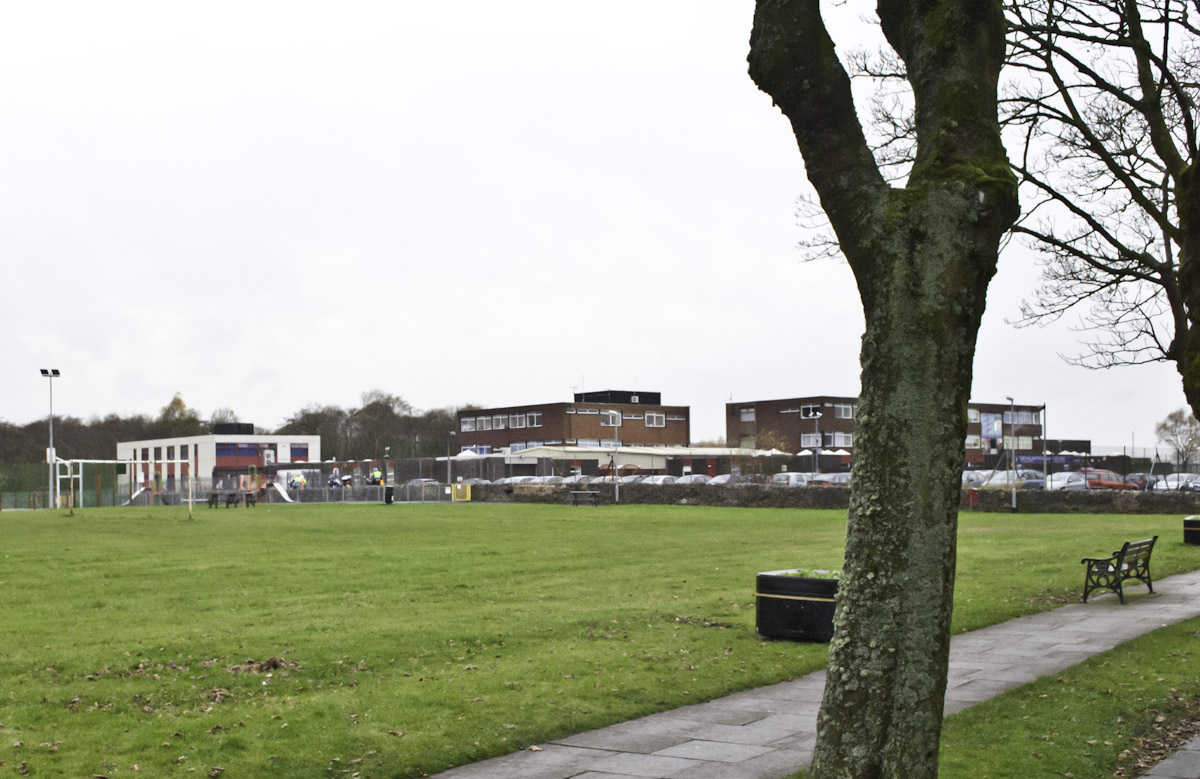
- View of the school grounds (November 2012)

Location
- Hollins Lane; Accrington, Lancashire, BB5 2QY; England
- Coordinates: 53.7381°N 2.3544°W

Information
- Type: Academy
- Local authority: Lancashire
- Trust: LET Education Trust
- Department for Education URN: 148922 Tables
- Ofsted: Reports
- Acting headteacher: Helen Dougan
- Gender: Coeducational
- Age: 11 to 16
- Website: www.thehollins.com

The Hollins (formerly known as The Hollins Technology College until 2017) is a coeducational secondary school located in Accrington in the English county of Lancashire.

== History ==
In 2015, the school took part in a Channel 4 programme, Sex in Class, which saw sex therapist Goedele Liekens visit the school and give some very graphic sex education classes. She was aiming to improve the teaching of the subject, but the show, and the school's participation in it, proved controversial and divisive. Some, including local community leaders, strongly criticised it as inappropriate while others argued that it reflected what teenagers really do in terms of sexual activity.

In 2015 and 2016, a group of pupils from the school took part in an art project called Beyond Labels: In Young Men’s Shoes, which saw a release of a book and film of their poetry. The project won the Young Artists Of the Year award from youth organisation SLYNCS. The school was also nominated for the Fusion Award in the Youth Leadership category. and was named Film of the Month for February 2017 by Into Film, which works with BAFTA.

In 2016, the school was recognised for exceptional progress in GCSEs for the second consecutive year.

Previously a community school administered by Lancashire County Council, in 2022 The Hollins converted to academy status. It is now sponsored by the LET Education Trust.

The current headteacher is Samantha Haydock.
