= Martin Clark (footballer, born 1970) =

English footballer

Personal information
- Full name: Martin Alan Clark
- Date of birth: 12 September 1970 (age 56)
- Place of birth: Accrington, England
- Position: Defender

Youth career
- Preston North End

Senior career*
| Years | Team | Apps | (Gls) |
| 1989–???? | Lancaster City | | |
| ????–1991 | Accrington Stanley | | |
| 1991–1994 | Crewe Alexandra | | |
| 1994–1997 | Southport | 141 | (10) |
| 1997–1999 | Rotherham United | 29 | (0) |
| 1999–2003 | Southport | 190 | (3) |
| 2003–2004 | Burscough | | |
| 2004–2005 | Lancaster City | | |
| 2005–2009 | Chorley | | |

Managerial career
- 2006: Chorley
- * Club domestic league appearances and goals

Martin Clark (born 12 September 1970) is an English former footballer who last played for Northern Premier League side Chorley, retiring after a string of knee injuries in February 2010. Clark played for Crewe Alexandra and Rotherham United in The Football League.

== Career ==
=== Early career ===
Clark began his career with Preston North End but did not make a senior appearance for them. He signed for Lancaster City where he made over 140 appearances the club before transferring to Accrington Stanley.

=== Crewe Alexandra ===
While at Stanley, he impressed in an FA Cup match against Crewe Alexandra who signed him in 1991. However, in his three years at the club he found his opportunities limited and was released at the end of his contract.

=== Southport ===
Dropping out of the football, Clark joined Football Conference side Southport.

Operating in numerous defensive role at Southport while working as a postman during the day, Clark went on to make over 140 appearances and found the target 10 times. In 1996–97 former Tranmere Rovers and Rotherham United player Ronnie Moore took up his first full-time position as a manager and saw Clark as an integral part of his team. Playing mainly as a Sweeper, Clark made 52 appearances for the 'Port and scoring 5 times that season.

=== Rotherham United ===
Before the start of the season Ronnie Moore left Southport to take over the managers seat at Rotherham United, taking Clark with him.

Much like his first spell in the Football League, Clark found his appearances at Rotherham limited and was unable to establish himself in the first team. After making only 29 appearances in two years he was soon on the move again.

=== Return to Southport ===
Clark re-signed for Southport for the 1999–2000 season and immediately picked up from where he left off. Re-establishing himself as a regular in the Southport back four he went on to make 50 appearances that season and finding the back of the net once. The next three years Clark make another 140 appearances for the club and scoring twice. In that time Clark was part of the side that came from behind to beat Football League opponents Notts County 4–2 at Haig Avenue in front of the BBC One show Match of the Day cameras. Heartache soon followed, despite their giant killing exploits Southport were unable to build on their performance and slumped to numerous disappointing defeats that saw manager Phil Wilson replaced by Mike Walsh. However that was unable to save them as they were relegated on the last day of the season after losing 0–3 at Stevenage Borough, with Clark visible upset by the result at the final whistle. This match proved to be the last The Sandgrounders would see of Clark and he was released after making over 300 appearances by Walsh who was now rebuilding for life in the league below.

=== Burscough ===
After leaving Haig Ave Clark trained in pre season with the team that replaced Southport in the Conference and one of his former teams, Accrington Stanley, however was unable to agree to anything long term. Clark proceeded to sign for his former teammate Derek Goulding at Burscough for the 2003–04 season. His time at Victoria Park was short lived and was soon on the move.

=== Return to Lancaster City ===
In February 2004, Clark once again signed for Lancaster City who at that time was managed by his former manager at Southport, Phil Wilson. Before the start of the 2005–06, City were experiencing financial difficulties which saw numerous players released including Clark. Wilson later spoke to the local paper stating that it was his toughest night in football.

=== Chorley ===
Clark signed for Chorley despite interest from Kendal Town, and made an immediate impact winning Players' Player of the Year in his first season at Victory Park. Following the departure of Jamie Vermiglio to Scarborough, Clark was made captain for the 2006–07 season. A poor start to the season which saw Chorley joint bottom of the league with no points and only one goal to show for the first four games, manager Shaun Teale was replaced by a former teammate of Clark's, Paul Lodge, with Clark becoming player-coach. Lodge's time at Chorley was short lived and after less than two months in the role resigned which saw Clark applying for the job and becoming caretaker manager for the interim. Clark missed out on getting the role full-time as it was given to Gerry Luczka instead, however he was later awarded the Players' Player of the Year award for the second successive season and KC Couriers' Player of the Year.

The 2007–08 season was a successful one again on the accolade front for Clark, winning Players' Player of the season for the third successive year as well as KC Couriers' Player of the Year for the second successive year, for the first time the Supporters Club Player of the Year and finally awarded for most league appearances. However, in July, in preparation for the 2008–09 season his captain's armband was given to Kieran Fletcher, however later that month he scored his first goal for the club in a friendly at Nelson.

In October 2008 Clark suffered a knee injury that saw him sidelined for the longest period in his career, only recovering from the injury after an operation in February 2009.

Only a year later in February 2010 after making over 150 appearances for the club, Clark called time on his career after having never fully recovered from the injury that sidelined him the previous season.
