= Telemetry (company) =

American online advertising firm (2009–2017)

- Type: Private
- Industry: Online advertising
- Founded: 2009
- Founder: Anthony Rushton; Russell Irwin; Beau Chesluk
- Defunct: 2017
- Headquarters: London, England
- Area served: Worldwide
- Key people: Anthony Rushton (CEO); Russell Irwin (CTO); Beau Chesluk (COO); Alex Frith (CFO)
- Number of employees: 54 (2011)
- Website: telemetry.com

Telemetry was an independent online advertising security and optimization firm, with offices in London and New York City. In January 2017, Telemetry shut down amid declining revenues.

== History ==
Telemetry was founded in 2009 by Anthony Rushton, Russell Irwin and Beau Chesluk. The three began collaborating in 2001, when they created branded online video games under the name JailDog. They launched the online TV station WeDigTV in 2007, winning a 2008 International Interactive Emmy Award for Best International Interactive TV Network. In order to get Telemetry off the ground, Rushton, Irwin and Chesluk each invested £10,000 of their own money. Within two years of its launch, the company was valued at £175 million.

Telemetry's system was initially developed exclusively for video, embedding code into an online video to record click-through and mouse activity in real-time. In 2012, the company expanded into the display and other forms of online advertising. In January 2017, Telemetry shut down amid declining revenues.

== Methodology ==
Telemetry is a private company, working independently with online digital video advertisers and agencies to provide impartial, detailed analytics and auditing in real time. The company tracks the efficiency and exposure gained by online digital advertising campaigns in order to ensure accountability and determine the true value of the campaign, exposing inflated reach and impressions. It investigates whether or not the ads were delivered on a suitable website, to the desired market, alongside the intended type of content. Previously, advertisers had to rely on biased analytics from the vender (essentially reporting on themselves) or traditional ad server statistics, which had not been designed to track online digital video advertising campaigns.

Telemetry has advised that in programmatic buying (when ads are bought and sold on a per-impression basis), the ways impressions are counted to set the price can be misleading. Ads purchased for pre-roll are sometimes placed instead into banner video ads, which are typically muted by the viewer, but still counted as if they were pre-roll impressions. Telemetry encourages advertisers to be diligent in demanding details of placement quality to ensure their ads are running in the proper space at the proper time, and that the impressions they are trading are genuine impressions. Telemetry has occasionally faced criticism for bypassing media agencies selling digital ad space and working with advertisers directly. According to 2014 estimates by the Interactive Advertising Bureau, approximately 36% of all reported Web traffic is considered fake, with the corresponding amount of fake ad views due to hijacked computers programmed to visit sites, cheating advertisers who pay based on the number of times their ad is loaded in response to a visit.

== Investigations ==
Telemetry has exposed large frauds perpetrated in the online advertising landscape, such as their 2014 investigation of Verizon Wireless's online video advertising purchases, finding that in excess of $1 million had been spent on fake Web views. With Telemetry's advice, Verizon, the eighth-largest advertiser in the US, demanded make-goods. Later in 2014, Telemetry investigated a Mercedes-Benz online advertising campaign, detecting suspicious traffic activity and finding that 57% of the campaign was viewed more often by automated computer programs than human beings. Mercedes was refunded for the false impressions. Telemetry also brought to the public's attention a scheme in which ads were forcefully "injected" onto popular sites (including Walmart.com, YouTube and others) by third-party sellers without the site owners' knowledge, with the profits going to the third party. In June 2014, Telemetry uncovered an ad fraud scheme that had been going on for several months, in which websites running lucrative video ads were being placed in banner ads on cheaper websites, with those behind the operation skimming around $10 million in video ad revenue per month. The scheme affected over 75 advertisers, including McDonald's, Coca-Cola and Ford. Rushton called it the most significant instance of ad fraud Telemetry has seen. Telemetry has publicly called out such companies by name, for unethically monetizing digital ads without the site owner's permission and manipulating impressions, while often generating a negative user experience.

== Clients ==
Telemetry's clients include Reckitt Benckiser, Anheuser-Busch, Verizon Wireless, L'Oreal and Mercedes-Benz.
