= Level 9 (band) =

Defunct British band

Level 9 was a short-lived British new wave band that existed from 1978 to 1980. They were formed in Manchester by ex-Love Explosion frontman Ian Hamilton (guitar) and David Bale (bass guitar, keyboards), together with Andy Kanavan (drums) and singer Lori Hartley. The band combined synthpop and post-punk styles into their songs.

Level 9 only released two singles, one in 1979 and another in 1980. The first, "Touch", was written over the course of a year by Andy Kanavan and Ian Hamilton, based on Kanavan's holiday in Tokyo two years earlier. "Touch" spent one week in the German charts in 1979. In 1980, Level 9 split up.
