= Kevin Horkin =

British journalist, pet consultant, and TV presenter

Kevin Horkin is a Lancashire business owner, journalist, pet consultant and TV presenter who has appeared on several animal-themed television programmes in the United Kingdom. He unsuccessfully contested the Hyndburn Parliamentary Constituency on behalf of the Conservative Party in both the 2015 general election and the 2017 United Kingdom general election.

== Career ==
Horkin left school at 16 to start his own business: a stall in Accrington Market selling clothing and jewelry. He later opened "The Eye Shop" on Warner Street in Accrington. He challenged the opticians' monopoly on the sale of over-the-counter ready reading glasses by writing to all MPs asking Margaret Thatcher to repeal the Opticians Act of 1958, and in 1987, he won the case. The General Optical Council took out simultaneous private prosecutions in an attempt to stop the sale of ready-made reading spectacles. Horkin successfully fought the actions of the General Optical Council. He subsequently rebranded his business from "The Eye Shop" to "Spex Opticians," opening 22 branches across Lancashire, Greater Manchester, and Merseyside.

Horkin has been a contributor and pet consultant to TV programmes, including This Morning with Richard & Judy.

Horkin's two books are Pets and personalities on Coronation Street and Star Dogs: What Stars Think about their Pets He has also appeared as a Pet Expert in The Pet Set (2003), a six-part series exploring our relationship with pets and Animal Tales (2004). Horkin also launched Pet Centric, opening seven pet stores across East Lancashire.

Horkin's 'Pet People' column appeared in The Sunday People newspaper from January 1995 onwards and included letters from readers in a weekly Questions and Answers feature. The column was renamed 'Pets And Their People' in March 1998. He has also been a regular columnist for the TV Times on its Animal page, 'Mad about Dogs', and Sainsbury's Pet Club Monthly Magazine, in which he had a Pet features column.

Horkin appeared in a film for television in which he played himself as a TV Pet Expert, called Catwalk Dogs.

Horkin is also the media director of Our Dogs, a position he has held since 2000.

== Political career ==
Between 1987 and 1991, Horkin was elected as a councillor on Hyndburn Borough Council, rising to the role of Group Whip for the Conservative Group. He was elected as the Councillor for the Altham Ward, obtaining 253 votes, or 40.1% of the vote. Horkin was also Joint Coordinator for the Hyndburn Constituency in 1987 for the re-election campaign for Ken Hargreaves MP.

In 2010, Horkin stood for office in the neighbouring authority of Ribble Valley. He contested the St.Mary's Ward in May 2011, achieving 502 votes or 47.27% of the vote.

Horkin was elected to Clitheroe Town Council for the Clitheroe St. Mary's Ward, receiving 499 votes and beating incumbent Simon Entwistle by one vote. Horkin was appointed Mayor of Clitheroe for the Civic Year 2013–2014. During his period in office, he launched the Clitheroe Community Fund.

Horkin was selected on 15 January 2015 by local Conservative Party members as their prospective parliamentary candidate to contest the Hyndburn parliamentary seat at the 2015 general election. He lost to Labour's Graham Jones by 4400 votes, a decrease of 2% in the Conservative vote compared to 2010. Horkin finished second, taking 31.9% of the vote.

Horkin was re-selected as the Conservative Party candidate for Hyndburn for the 2017 general election, ten days after the General Election Campaign began. Horkin increased the Conservative vote in Hyndburn by 4,629 to 18,305 from 13,676 in 2015, an increase of 8.6%. However, Horkin finished second behind Labour Party candidate Graham Jones, who once again increased his share of the vote by 6,045 from 42.1 to 53.4%. This was 1,405 votes less than the 19,405 votes achieved by Ken Hargreaves when he first won the seat in 1983, only 1.7% less than the 42.2% he achieved.

== Philanthropy ==
Since 2009, Horkin has been a board member of the Development Advisory Group of the Community Foundation for Merseyside & Lancashire. This charitable trust helps donors support their community by channeling money into community projects. Horkin has organised a number of Special Children's Christmas Parties for Disabled Children at Number 10 Downing Street, including one hosted by Ant and Dec. In 2014, Horkin received a Lifetime Legends of Industry Award from the Variety Club of Great Britain for his work with the Foundation.

Horkin has been a patron of 'The Kirsty Appeal' named after Kirsty Howard helping to raise over £5 million for an extension for Francis House Children's Hospice in Manchester. In recognition of his philanthropic work, he was awarded Lancashire Community Philanthropist of the Year in 2011.

In 1990, Horkin also founded the Pet Role Trust, a registered charitable trust improving animal health and welfare through charitable fund-raising, primarily for the Kennel Club Health Foundation and Manchester Dog's Home. The Pet Role Trust also distributes cash to other smaller animal charities.

== Awards ==
Horkin was appointed Member of the Order of the British Empire (MBE) in the 2017 Queen's Birthday Honours List, "for Services to Charity and to the Community in Clitheroe, Lancashire."
