= Graham Jones (politician) =

British politician

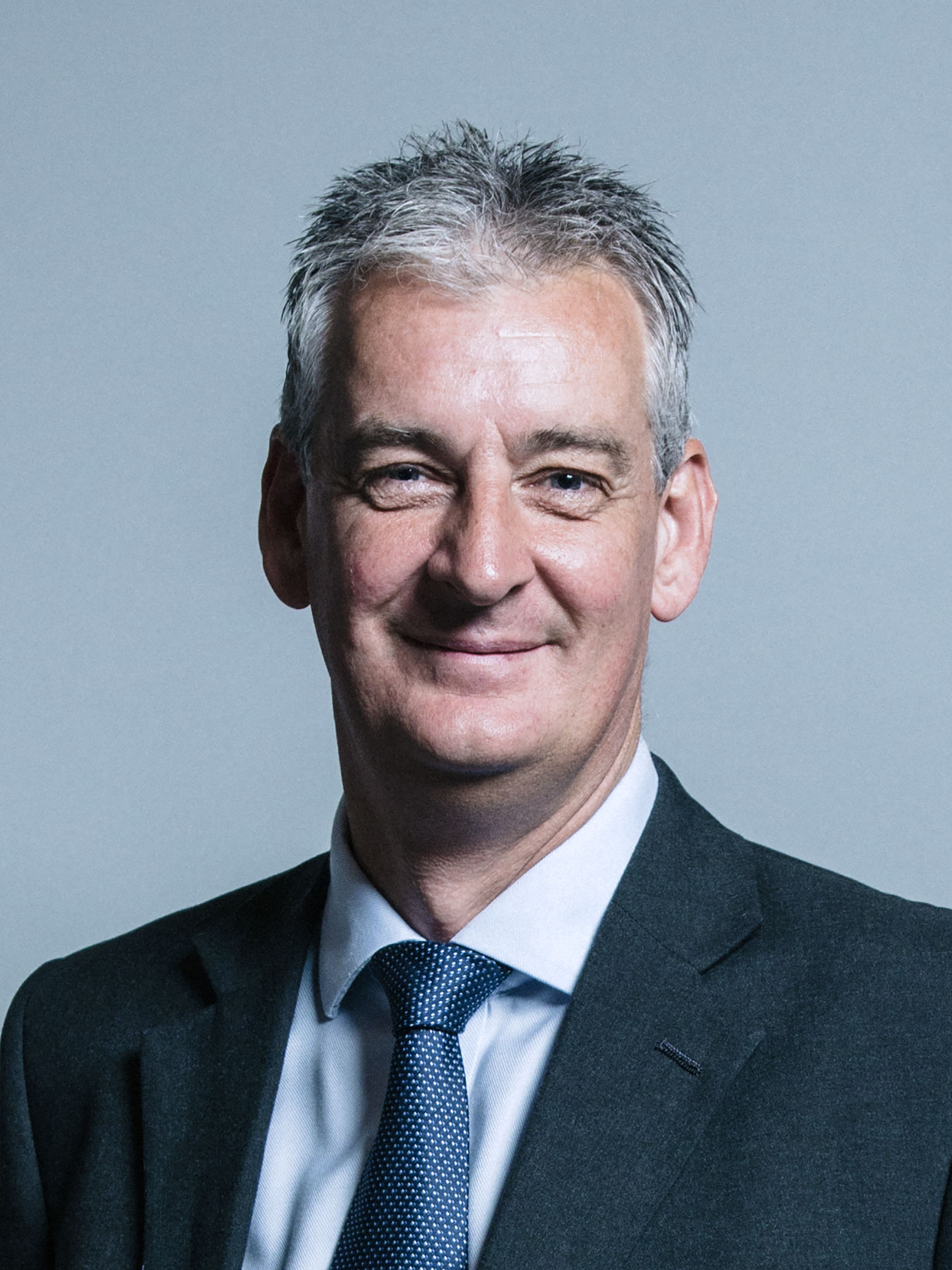
- Official portrait, 2017

Chair of the Committees on Arms Export Controls
- In office 22 November 2017 – 6 November 2019
- Succeeded by: Mark Garnier

Member of Parliament for Hyndburn
- In office 6 May 2010 – 6 November 2019
- Preceded by: Greg Pope
- Succeeded by: Sara Britcliffe

Personal details
- Born: Graham Peter Jones; 3 March 1966 (age 60) Accrington, Lancashire, England
- Party: Labour
- Domestic partner: Kimberley Whitehead
- Children: 2
- Education: University of Central Lancashire, BA
- Profession: Prepress

Graham Peter Jones (born 3 March 1966) is a British Labour Party politician who was Member of Parliament (MP) for Hyndburn from 2010 until 2019.

== Early life and education ==
Jones's father's family originate from the Mill Hill area of Blackburn, and his mother's family from Accrington. His grandfather worked at Howard and Bulloughs Cotton Mil. Jones was brought up in Baxenden, attending St John's CofE Primary School, Baxenden, and St Christopher's Church of England High School, Accrington. He attended Accrington and Rossendale College, studying A levels. After three years at college, Jones was employed for Blackburn with Darwen Council on refuse collection, and by Lancashire County Council as a carer home assistant.

Jones attended the University of Central Lancashire in 1989, to study a BA in Graphic Design, and as well as completing a City and Guilds qualification in Desktop Publishing, followed by employment at Holland's Pies. He then took employment for two years with Blackburn Council working in the parks department and refuse collection.

Jones had periods of temporary and part time work for Lancashire County Council in various roles; as a community transport driver, meals on wheels driver and care assistant at Whinberry View, Rawtenstall. He attended night school, passing City & Guilds qualifications in digital press. From 2001 until 7 May 2010, the day after the 2010 general election, Jones worked at Daltons Printers.

== Local government career ==
In November 2001, he was one of two candidates, selected from four, to contest the safe Labour seat of Peel Ward on Hyndburn Council. He was re-elected in 2004, and again in 2008.

In May 2005, he was elected as the Opposition Leader on Hyndburn Borough Council, and remained as such until his resignation from Hyndburn Council in May 2010, the seat being retained by Labour Councillor Wendy Dwyer, who had been Jones' predecessor in the Accrington South division on Lancashire County Council elections.

In June 2009, he contested the Accrington South Division (Peel, Baxenden and Barnfield wards) for the County Council amidst the MP's expenses scandal. His majority was reduced from 17.6% to 17.1%, a majority of 469 votes, making it one of Labour's safer seats. Across Lancashire County, Labour were reduced from 44 seats to 16.

In February 2010 The Blackburn Citizen reported that Jones had acted in "technical breach" of council rules, in discussing unadopted roads Annie Street, Hodder Street and Manor Street at meetings, whilst on one occasion failing to mention that he lived on Hodder Street. The Hyndburn Standards Committee concluded that Jones had not attempted to conceal his address from the council, having declared it on other occasions.

In July 2010, he was also involved in a dispute with rival councillor Peter Britcliffe, who implied that Jones had other undeclared property interests by repeatedly shouting "two houses" at Jones during a council meeting. Britcliffe subsequently apologised after legal threats, acknowledging that the second home belonged to a late relative of Jones and was not his property.

== Parliamentary career ==
Hyndburn's Labour MP Greg Pope suddenly announced his intention to step down on 11 June 2009. In November 2009, Jones was chosen as the candidate to succeed him by Labour; he held the seat by a majority of 3,090 at the 2010 general election.

In October 2010, Jones was appointed to the Labour Whips office, following Ed Miliband becoming Labour leader. He was an assistant whip throughout the 2010–15 Parliament. In August 2013, he was reselected as the Labour candidate for the 2015 general election.

On 14 September 2015, Jones resigned from the front benches following the election of Jeremy Corbyn in the leadership contest. He said he could not serve under Mr Corbyn as he was from the "extreme left", and did not hold Labour's "true values". Jones was critical of Corbyn's policies on welfare, the economy and immigration, and believed Labour in opposition must be "more fiscally responsible". He supported Owen Smith in the failed attempt to replace Jeremy Corbyn in the 2016 leadership election.

Jones was a leading member of the successful campaign to reduce maximum stake on fixed-odds betting terminals (FOBTs) from £100 to £2. In agreeing to the change, the government took up a Labour manifesto pledge. Described by Labour List as "a stunning victory for those who have led a five-year long campaign to reduce the impact that FOBTs, the “crack cocaine of gambling”, can have on communities, families and individual gamblers."

Jones also established and was Chair of the All Party Parliamentary Group on Metal, Stone and Heritage Crime to raise awareness of the social and economic impact of metal, stone and heritage crime. Jones was at the forefront of the campaign to amend the Scrap Metal Dealers Act 1964 and stamp out illegal scrap metal dealers plaguing estates. In November 2011, he introduced a private member's bill under the Ten Minute Rule, proposing licensing for scrap metal dealers in an attempt to cut down on metal theft which led to the Scrap Metals Dealers Act 2013. He called for travelling scrap metal dealers to be legally required to carry clearly visible identification signs on their vehicles including a contact number.

By November 2017, Jones was Chair of the All Party Parliamentary Group on Venezuela, and argued for support for the opposition in Venezuela.

Jones also established the All Party Parliamentary Group, Transport Across the North, a dedicated cross-party forum to promote discussion and investment in all modes of transport across the North of England and to provide better opportunities for MPs representing Northern constituencies to meet with senior officials and receive relevant briefings. Jones was elected as Chair to campaign to fight for fair resources across the North.

He was chair of the Committees on Arms Export Controls in the 57th parliament defeating the Conservative MP for North East Hampshire, Ranil Jayawardena MP. As Chair, Jones raised the 'forgotten war' in Yemen as well as raising serious concerns about China. Jones set up the Labour Friends of Yemen and became its first Chair.

In 2017, Jones was elected to the Defence Select Committee. Jones was a strong advocate for increased defence spending and for defending Eastern Europe and the Caucasus against threats from Russia.

Jones was one of six Labour MPs elected by the Parliamentary Labour Party to the Parliamentary Committee which meets weekly in private with the Leader and Deputy Leader of the Labour Party. He was also elected as Chair of the Labour Parliamentary Committee on Culture Media and Sport.

In 2019, Jones was elected as a Parliamentary representative to the OSCE (Organization for Security and Co-operation in Europe).

He lost his seat at the general election of 2019. His Conservative successor, Sara Britcliffe, is the daughter of Peter Britcliffe, the councillor against whom he previously took legal action. After the election result had been declared, Jones said, "Obviously, I am disappointed but ... I'm pleased that I went straight from a factory to a frontbencher."

== Life after Parliament ==
After the election, Sara Britcliffe was photographed in a nightclub wearing a t-shirt with Jones' picture printed on it, mocking him; Jones described it as "childish behaviour".

Jones said that he wanted to help local charities and stay involved with the local Labour Party. He stated that he was "100 per cent" committed to standing to become Hyndburn's next MP, insisting he has "unfinished business".

In March 2023, he was reselected as Labour's prospective parliamentary candidate for the Haslingden and Hyndburn constituency; however, on 13 February 2024 he was suspended by Labour, following reports of comments he made about the Gaza war. Jones said Britons who go to Israel to fight for the Israel Defense Forces "should be locked up". Jones' suspension was lifted at the end of May 2024.

== Personal life ==
Jones' partner is Kimberley Whitehead, with whom he has a daughter. He was previously married and has one son.

He is a lifelong supporter of Blackburn Rovers, and also attends games at Accrington Stanley. The latter's chairman, Ilyas Khan, played an active role in Jones' 2010 election campaign.

Parliament of the United Kingdom
Preceded by Greg Pope	Member of Parliament for Hyndburn; 2010–2019	Succeeded by Sara Britcliffe
