= St James' Church, Church Kirk =

Coordinates: 53.7576°N 2.3940°W

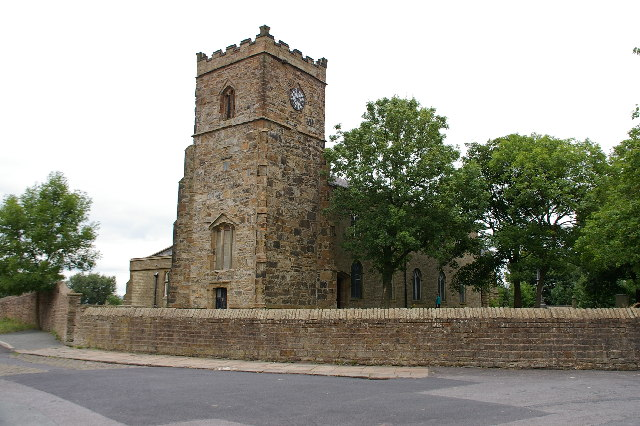
- St James' Church from the southwest

- Location in the Borough of Hyndburn
- OS grid reference: SD 741 291
- Location: St James' Road, Church, Hyndburn, Lancashire
- Country: England
- Denomination: Anglican
- Website: St James, Church Kirk

History
- Status: Parish church

Architecture
- Functional status: Redundant
- Heritage designation: Grade II*
- Designated: 9 March 1984
- Architectural type: Church
- Style: Gothic, Georgian, Gothic Revival
- Completed: 1896

Specifications
- Materials: Sandstone, slate roof

Administration
- Province: York
- Diocese: Blackburn
- Archdeaconry: Blackburn
- Deanery: Accrington
- Parish: Church (or Church Kirk)

St James' Church is an redundant church in St James' Road, Church, Hyndburn, Lancashire, England. It was an active Anglican parish church in the deanery of Accrington, the archdeaconry of Blackburn, and the diocese of Blackburn until November 2015 when it was closed. The church is recorded in the National Heritage List for England as a designated Grade II* listed building.

== History ==
A church has been on the site since 642 AD, and the site is historically associated with St Oswald who camped here on his route from Northumbria to Maserfield in Cheshire to fight the Mercian king Penda. The tower dates from the late medieval period, and the nave was built in 1804–05. The parapet was added to the tower in 1844. In 1895–96 the chancel was built, and tracery was installed in the nave windows. The stained glass in the south nave windows was replaced in 1918 following damage caused by an explosion in a nearby ammunition factory. The tower was damaged by fire in 1983.

== Architecture ==
=== Exterior ===
The church is constructed in sandstone with slate roofs. In the body of the church the stone is coursed, but in the tower it is uncoursed and roughly hewn. The plan consists of a five-bay nave, a three-bay chancel, and a west tower. The tower is supported by buttresses, and has a low rectangular west door, above which is a three-light Perpendicular window. There are Perpendicular bell openings on three sides of the tower, and a clock on the fourth side. The parapet is embattled. The nave is in two storeys, with two tiers of windows along the sides. These are round-arched, in Georgian style, and contain tracery from the Victorian period. The chancel windows are arched with tracery.

=== Interior ===
Inside the church are galleries on three sides, carried on octagonal cast iron columns with fluting and roundels in the capitals. At the west end is a pair of staircases. The ceiling is flat. The reredos was made by J. Powell & Sons of Whitefriars Glass in 1909, and is made using the opus sectile technique. The font is Perpendicular in style. In the south wall of the nave are two sets of windows with stained glass depicting the Four Evangelists. These were remade by Morris & Co. in 1918 to the original designs of Edward Burne-Jones after they were damaged in the 1917 explosion for the cost of £230. On the south side of the chancel are windows of 1927 by B. D. Walmsley. There was a ring of eight bells, all cast in 1865–67 by John Warner & Sons, but these were removed and are to be rehung elsewhere. Parts of the frame were used at St Cuthbert's Church, Over Kellet, Lancashire, and one bell was re-hung at Church of St Andrew, Compton Dundon, Somerset in 2025.

== See also ==
- Grade II* listed buildings in Lancashire
- Listed buildings in Church, Lancashire
