= Listed buildings in Rishton =

Rishton is a small town in Hyndburn, Lancashire, England. It contains eleven listed buildings, which are designated by Historic England and recorded in the National Heritage List for England. Of these, one is listed at Grade II*, the middle grade, and the others are at Grade II. There is one listed building inside the town itself, the war memorial. The others are in the surrounding rural area, and most of the listed buildings are, or originated as, farmhouses. The Leeds and Liverpool Canal passes through the area, and three bridges crossing it are listed.

== Key ==
Grade	Criteria
II*	Particularly important buildings of more than special interest
II	Buildings of national importance and special interest

== Buildings ==
Name and location	Photograph	Date	Notes	Grade
Parker's Farmhouse; 53.75624°N 2.42606°W	—	c. 1600 (probable)	A sandstone farmhouse, partly rendered, with a stone-slate roof, it is in two storeys and three bays. On the front is a gabled two-storey porch with a Tudor arched doorway and a large lintel, and at the rear is an outshut stair turret. The windows are mullioned, and one window also has a transom. Inside is an inglenook, and timber-framed partitions with wattle and daub infill.	II*
Whitebirk North Cottage; 53.75853°N 2.44114°W	—	Early 17th century (probable)	Originally a farmhouse, it has been extended and converted into a private dwelling. The house is in rendered stone with stone-slate roofs. It is in three parts, the central part with two storeys, a low single-storey service wing to the right, and a two-storey extension to the left. Some of the windows are mullioned.	II
Windy Bank Farmhouse; 53.77465°N 2.44857°W	—	Early 17th century (probable)	The farmhouse is in sandstone with a stone-slate roof. It has two storeys and three bays, with an outshut at the rear. There are two porches, the older porch with two storeys, and the later gabled porch with one. Some of the windows are mullioned and others have been altered.	II
Manor House Farmhouse; 53.77605°N 2.40814°W	—	17th century	The sandstone farmhouse has a stone-slate roof, it is in two storeys and three bays. The doorway has a Tudor arch, some of the windows have retained their mullions, and others have been altered.	II
Rose Cottage; 53.75586°N 2.42636°W	—	17th century	The former farmhouse is in stone with a slate roof. It has two storeys and an L-shaped plan, consisting of a two-bay range, and a cross-wing. There is a lean-to porch in the angle, and the windows are mullioned. Inside the cross-wing is a timber-framed partition.	II
Whitebirk Moss Farmhouse; 53.75790°N 2.44189°W	—	17th century	A sandstone farmhouse with a stone-slate roof in two storeys. The farmhouse has three bays, and an outshut of two bays. On the front is a two-storey gabled porch. The windows are mullioned.	II
Higher Side Beet Farmhouse; 53.76616°N 2.44347°W	—	1699	The farmhouse is in sandstone with a slate roof. It has two storeys and three bays, and a 19th-century wing at the rear. There is a modern brick porch with an old inscribed lintel, to the left of which is a stair light. Some windows have retained their mullions, and others have been altered.	II
Canal bridge number 106, (Side Beet Bridge); 53.76681°N 2.44666°W		c. 1810	The bridge carries Side Beet Lane over the Leeds and Liverpool Canal. It is in sandstone, and consists of a single elliptical arch with a flat deck, rusticated voussoirs, bands, and parapets with ridged coping. The ends are curved and have pilasters.	II
Canal bridge number 107, (Cut Lane Bridge); 53.76946°N 2.43345°W		c. 1810	The bridge carries Cut Lane over the Leeds and Liverpool Canal. It is in sandstone, and consists of a single elliptical arch with rusticated voussoirs, bands, parapets rising to a point and pilasters at the ends.	II
Canal bridge number 108, (Tottleworth Bridge); 53.77306°N 2.41436°W		c. 1810	The bridge carries Bridge Street over the Leeds and Liverpool Canal. It is in sandstone, and consists of a single high elliptical arch rusticated voussoirs, bands, parapets with copings, and pilasters at the ends. The bridge also carries a large pipe across its south side.	II
Rishton War Memorial; 53.76478°N 2.42548°W		1923	The war memorial stands in a triangular garden on an island in the centre of a road junction, and is in Creetown granite on sandstone steps. The memorial consists of a pylon on a two-stepped base, it is approached by steps, and is 6.7 metres (22 ft) high. The pylon has a triangular plan, chamfered corners, a pyramidal top, and a flared foot. On the top are antefixae with anthemion, below this is a frieze, and each face has a tablet with a laurel wreath and a crown. The plinth is triangular with square corner columns, and is inscribed with the names of those lost in the First World War. On the steps on the north side is a granite tablet with the names of those lost in the Second World War and the Korean War. The garden is surrounded by decorative metal bollards linked by chains.	II
