= Listed buildings in Church, Lancashire =

Church is a village in Hyndburn, Lancashire, England. It contains six buildings that are recorded in the National Heritage List for England as designated listed buildings. Of these, one is listed at Grade II*, the middle grade, and the others are at Grade II. The Leeds and Liverpool Canal passes through the village, and three of the listed buildings are associated with it; two bridges and a warehouse. The other listed buildings in the village are a church, a large house, and a war memorial.

== Key ==
Grade	Criteria
II*	Particularly important buildings of more than special interest
II	Buildings of national importance and special interest

== Buildings ==
Name and location	Photograph	Date	Notes	Grade
St James' Church; 53.75755°N 2.39411°W		Late medieval	The oldest part of the church is the tower. The nave was built in 1804–05, and the chancel in 1895–96. The church is built in sandstone with slate roofs, and consists of a two-storey nave with two tiers of round-headed windows, a chancel, and a west tower. The tower has buttresses, a west door, Perpendicular window and bell openings, a clock face, and an embattled parapet. Inside the church are galleries on three sides.	II*
Canal bridge number 111D; 53.75268°N 2.39232°W		c. 1810	The bridge carries Bridge Street over the Leeds and Liverpool Canal. It is in sandstone and consists of a single elliptical arch with voussoirs, bands, parapets with ridged copings and pilasters at the north end. The bridge also carries two pipes.	II
Church Kirk Bridge; 53.75762°N 2.39579°W		c. 1810	This is bridge number 112 over the Leeds and Liverpool Canal, and it carries St James road over the canal. It is a changeline bridge, and it also carries a pipe over the canal. The bridge is in sandstone and consists of a single elliptical arch with rusticated voussoirs, and parapets with ridged copings.	II
Canal Warehouse; 53.75267°N 2.39187°W		1836	The warehouse stands by the Leeds and Liverpool Canal, it is in sandstone with a slate roof. There are four storeys and the building has an L-shaped plan. Facing the road are two gabled blocks joined by a range containing a giant arch with rusticated voussoirs. Behind the right block is a wing containing windows and loading doors.	II
Elmfield Hall; 53.75690°N 2.38077°W		1850s	A large house, later used as a social centre, it is in stone with a hipped slate roof, and in Classical style, There are two storeys and a symmetrical five-bay front. In the central is a porch with four Corinthian columns, a cornice and a balustraded parapet. Above the door is a three-light window with an open segmental pediment and a cornice on consoles. All the upper floor windows have balconies.	II
War memorial 53.75670°N 2.38077°W	—	c. 1920	The war memorial stands in front of Elmfield Hall. It is in white stone and consists of a draped female figure with arms outstretched leaning against a plinth on a taped base. On the back is a carved script.	II
