= Church, Lancashire =

Village in Hyndburn, Lancashire, England

Coordinates: 53.755°N 2.386°W

Church
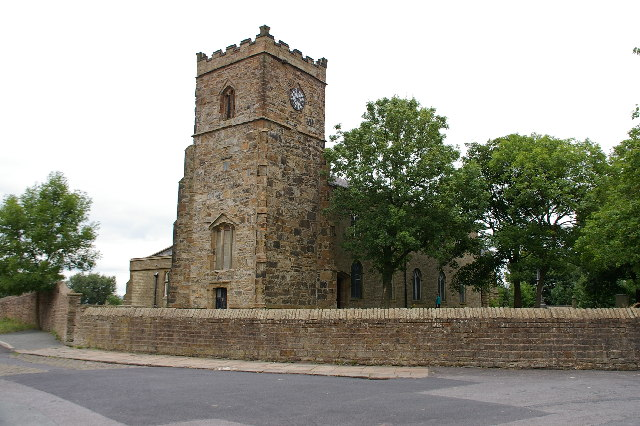
- St James' Church, Church Kirk

- Shown within Hyndburn Location within Lancashire
- Area: 0.51 sq mi (1.3 km^{2})
- Population: 5,186 (2011)
  - Density: 10,169/sq mi (3,926/km^{2})
- OS grid reference: SD746288
  - London: 231 miles (372 km)
- District: Hyndburn
- Shire county: Lancashire
- Region: North West
- Country: England
- Sovereign state: United Kingdom
- Post town: ACCRINGTON
- Postcode district: BB5
- Dialling code: 01254
- Police: Lancashire
- Fire: Lancashire
- Ambulance: North West
- UK Parliament: Hyndburn
- Website: hyndburnbc.gov.uk

Church is a large village in Hyndburn, Lancashire, England, situated one mile (1.6 km) west of Accrington. The village had a population of 5,186 at the 2011 census, an increase from 3,990 according to the 2001 census. (Note: The area in 2001 was listed as 112 hectares (0.43 mi^{2}), whereas in 2011 it was listed as 132.5 hectares (0.51 mi^{2}) and included part of Altham civil parish.)

== History and geography ==
Church was once a township in the ancient parish of Whalley, covering an area along the eastern side of Hyndburn Brook. Tinker Brook, up to Foxhill Bank, formed the boundary with Oswaldtwistle in the south and Bottom Syke from Dunkenhalgh, the boundary with Clayton-le-Moors to the north. This became a civil parish in 1866.

The parish church is the medieval Church of St James. The tower dates to the late medieval era, and was damaged by a fire in 1983. The nave was constructed in 1805.

As planned, the route of the Leeds and Liverpool Canal was to continue up the valley of the River Hyndburn to serve Accrington. However, when it was extended from Enfield at the start of the 19th century, the route was altered as the Peel family's textile print works at Church was one of the largest factories in the world and used the river's water during the printing process. Building the embankment for the canal to cross the Hyndburn would have interrupted the water supply. Instead, the canal was built downstream, re-joining the original line at a right angle junction. Most of the land for the deviation had to be purchased from the Petre family of Dunkenhalgh. Although they supported the canal's construction, they requested that the towpath was made on the opposite side of the canal from the house, hoping this would prevent poachers from gaining easy access to their estate. Church is the halfway point on the Leeds and Liverpool Canal.

The main road running through the village is the A679. The local travel links are located less than a mile from the village centre to Church and Oswaldtwistle railway station and 27 miles (43 km) to Blackpool Airport.

== Governance ==
Prior to 1894 Church had a civil parish, and between 1894 and 1974 the area was administered by an Urban District. It has since become an unparished part of the borough of Hyndburn.

== Economy and amenities ==
Church is a large village with a wealth of amenities, including a supermarket, bakery, bookmaker, sports centre, a fire station and a car sales garage. Another car sales garage was closed down and demolished in 2015, making way for a restaurant. A small library was also once located in the village, but closed in 2006.

== Education ==
Church is home to St. Nicholas C.E. Primary School.

== Notable people ==
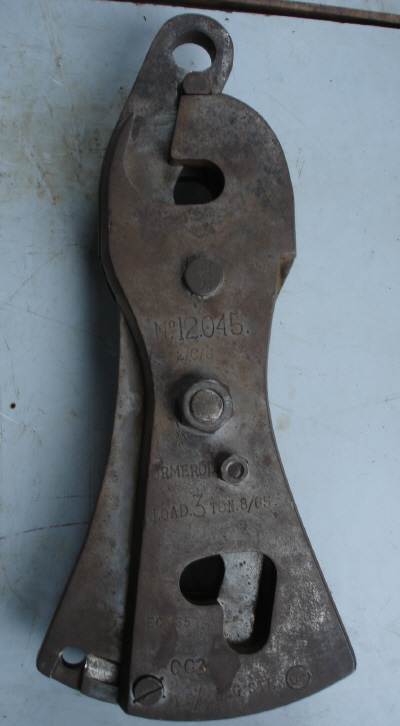
The Ormerod Link

- Edward Ormerod (1834–1894), born locally, in 1867 invented the patented Ormerod Butterfly Clip, which has saved the lives of numerous coal miners.
- Walter Marsden (1882–1969), sculptor, saw active service in the WW1, awarded the Military Cross and Bar.
- Magdalen Nabb (1947–2007), author, wrote the Marshal Guarnaccia detective novels.
- Mina Anwar (born 1969), actress, played Constable Maggie Habib in The Thin Blue Line

=== Sport ===
- Johnny Holt (1865–1937), footballer who played 225 games for Everton and 10 for England
- Jimmy Whitehead (1870–1929), footballer who played 183 games and 2 for England
- Arthur Chadwick (1875–1936), footballer who played 206 games and 2 for England

== See also ==
- Listed buildings in Church, Lancashire
