= 2026 Hyndburn Borough Council election =

2026 English local government election

- 7 May 2026

11 of 35 seats to Hyndburn Borough Council 18 seats needed for a majority
| | First party | Second party | Third party |
|---|---|---|---|
| Leader | Munsif Dad | Zak Khan | Anthony Mitchell |
| Party | Labour | Conservative | Reform |
| Leader's seat | Spring Hill | St Oswald's | Huncoat |
| Last election | 24 | 11 | 0 |
| Seats before | 21 | 11 | 0 |
| Seats after | 17 | 8 | 8 |
| Seat change | ▼4 | ▼3 | ▲8 |
| | Fourth party | Fifth party |
| Leader | Shabir Fazal | Sohail Asghar |
| Party | Green | Independent |
| Leader's seat | Central | Spring Hill |
| Last election | 1 | 1 |
| Seats before | 2 | 1 |
| Seats after | 1 | 1 |
| Seat change | ▼1 | Steady |
- 2026 local election results in Hyndburn Reform UK Labour Conservative Independent Not contested
Leader before election
Munsif Dad
Labour
Elected Leader
Munsif Dad
Labour
No overall control

The 2026 Hyndburn Borough Council election was held on 7 May 2026, to elect 11 of the 35 members of Hyndburn Borough Council in Lancashire, England, being the usual approximate third of the council. This was on the same day as other local elections across the country.

Hyndburn requested the election to be cancelled, but the government abandoned its initial plans to cancel some 2026 elections following a legal challenge.

Prior to this election, the council was under Labour majority control. At the election, the council went under no overall control. Labour remained the largest party, but fell one seat short of a majority. They managed to form a minority administration, and the incumbent Labour leader of the council, Munsif Dad, was reappointed to the role at the annual council meeting on 28 May 2026.

== Background ==
Before the election Labour had 21 councillors, the Conservatives had 13 councillors and the Greens had 1. Eighteen or more seats are needed for overall control of the council. Labour were running the council as a majority administration.

The seats up for election in 2026 had last been contested in 2022. Due to plans outlined by the government in 2024 to abolish several borough councils in Lancashire in favour of new unitary authorities, it was not known if the 2026 election in Hyndburn would be required. In 2025, Labour council leader Munsif Dad had said that the elections would be going ahead as planned.

Munsif Dad later wrote to the government to request a delay to the election until 2027, and the government initially agreed to delay the election. On 16 February 2026, the government abandoned its plans to delay the elections after a legal challenge, and confirmed that the election would take place as originally planned.

== Council composition ==
| After 2024 election | | Before 2026 election | | After 2026 election | |
| Party | Seats | Party | Seats | Party | Seats |
|---|---|---|---|---|---|
| Labour | 22 | Labour | 21 | Labour | 17 |
| Conservative | 11 | Conservative | 11 | Conservative | 8 |
| Reform | 0 | Reform | 0 | Reform | 8 |
| Green | 1 | Green | 2 | Green | 1 |
| Independent | 1 | Independent | 1 | Independent | 1 |

Following this election, Labour lost its majority control of the council, being left with only 17 seats, instead of the 18 or more needed for full control. The council was therefore left under no overall control. Labour held one seat, the Conservatives re-gained one seat, an independent won one seat and Reform gained the remaining eight seats.

=== Changes 2024–2026 ===
- November 2024: Edward Blake (Labour) dies – by-election held February 2025
- February 2025: David Heap (Conservative) gains by-election from Labour
- June 2025: Joyce Plummer (Independent) joins Conservatives
- February 2026: Marlene Haworth (Conservative) dies
- March 2026: Josh Allen (Conservative) resigns the from the Conservative party.
- April 2026: Andrew Clegg (Labour) defects to the Green Party.

== Incumbents ==
| Ward | Incumbent councillor | Party | Re-standing |
|---|---|---|---|
| Clayton-le-Moors | Peter Edwards | Conservative | No |
| Huncoat | Danny Cassidy | Conservative | No |
| Immanuel | Josh Allen (Note: Elected as a Conservative. Now standing as an independent.) | Conservative | Yes (Note: Elected as a Conservative, but left the party to sit as an independent) |
| Milnshaw | Andrew Clegg (Note: Originally elected as Labour, but later left the party and joined the Greens.) | Green | Yes |
| Netherton | Jodi Clements | Labour | Yes |
| Overton | Scott Brerton | Labour | Yes |
| Peel | Joyce Plummer (Note: Previously sitting as an independent, she joined the Conservatives in June 2025.) | Conservative | Yes |
| Rishton | Bernard Dawson | Labour | Yes |
| Spring Hill | Kimberley Whitehead | Labour | No |
| St Andrew's | Steven Smithson | Conservative | Yes (Note: Standing in Immanuel ward.) |
| St Oswald's | Vacant | Conservative (Note: Vacant seat last held by the Conservatives.) | N/A |

The results for when this set of seats was last contested are at 2022 Hyndburn Borough Council election.

NB: Five (of the 16) Council wards, where seats were NOT up for re-election in 2026, included the following wards - Altham, Baxenden and Church, plus Barnfield and Central in Accrington.

== Election results ==
2026 Hyndburn Borough Council election
| Party | This election | | | | Full council | | | This election | | |
| Party | Candidates | Seats | Net | Seats % | Other | Total | Total % | Votes | Votes % | +/− |
|---|---|---|---|---|---|---|---|---|---|---|
| Labour | {{{candidates}}} | 1 | ▼3 | 9.1 | 16 | 17 | 48.6 | 3,490 | 21.2 | ▼26.5 |
| Reform | {{{candidates}}} | 8 | ▲8 | 72.7 | 0 | 8 | 22.9 | 6,889 | 41.9 | ▲40.2 |
| Conservative | {{{candidates}}} | 1 | ▼5 | 9.1 | 7 | 8 | 22.9 | 3,696 | 22.5 | ▼12.7 |
| Independent | {{{candidates}}} | 1 | ▲1 | 9.1 | 0 | 1 | 2.9 | 664 | 4.0 | ▲3.4 |
| Green | {{{candidates}}} | 0 | ▼1 | 0.0 | 1 | 1 | 2.9 | 1,690 | 10.3 | ▼3.6 |

== Ward results ==
The results for each ward were as follows, with an asterisk (*) indicating a sitting councillor standing for re-election.

=== Clayton-le-Moors ===
Clayton-le-Moors
| Party | Candidate | Votes | % | ±% |
|---|---|---|---|---|
| Reform | Miles Parkinson | 668 | 47.6 | N/A |
| Labour Co-op | Richard Downie | 396 | 28.2 | −18.1 |
| Conservative | Jayde Holmes | 177 | 12.6 | −41.1 |
| Green | Sara Michaels | 162 | 11.5 | N/A |
| Majority | | 272 | | |
| Rejected ballots | | 3 | | |
| Turnout | | 1408 | 40.5 | |
| Registered electors | | 3,475 | | |
| Reform gain from Conservative | | Swing | | |

=== Huncoat ===
Huncoat
| Party | Candidate | Votes | % | ±% |
|---|---|---|---|---|
| Reform | Anthony Mitchell | 697 | 49.2 | N/A |
| Labour | Nick King | 339 | 23.9 | −16.9 |
| Green | Jodie Green | 234 | 16.5 | N/A |
| Conservative | Andrew Libberton | 148 | 10.4 | −48.8 |
| Majority | | 358 | | |
| Rejected ballots | | 8 | | |
| Turnout | | 1427 | 40.6 | |
| Registered electors | | 3,516 | | |
| Reform gain from Conservative | | Swing | | |

=== Immanuel ===
Steven Smithson was the incumbent councillor for St Andrews, but was standing in Immanuel against the former Conservative Josh Allen, who resigned from the party in March, whilst veteran Conservative Peter Britcliffe stood in St Andrews.

Immanuel
| Party | Candidate | Votes | % | ±% |
|---|---|---|---|---|
| Conservative | Steven Smithson* | 650 | 43.6 | −11.6 |
| Reform | Anna Stanislawska | 518 | 36.9 | N/A |
| Independent | Josh Allen* | 236 | 16.8 | −38.4 |
| Majority | | 132 | | |
| Rejected ballots | | 32 | | |
| Turnout | | 1437 | 41.5 | |
| Registered electors | | 3,466 | | |
| Conservative gain from Independent | | Swing | | |

=== Milnshaw ===
Andrew Clegg (formerly Labour) defected to the Green Party, in April.

Milnshaw
| Party | Candidate | Votes | % | ±% |
|---|---|---|---|---|
| Reform | Joel Tetlow | 609 | 50.0 | N/A |
| Green | Andy Clegg* | 297 | 24.4 | −24.3 |
| Labour | Hannah Fisher | 193 | 15.8 | −32.9 |
| Conservative | Foyzun Nur | 120 | 9.8 | −22.1 |
| Majority | | 312 | | |
| Rejected ballots | | 10 | | |
| Turnout | | 1230 | 33.8 | |
| Registered electors | | 3,638 | | |
| Reform gain from Green | | Swing | | |

=== Netherton ===
Netherton
| Party | Candidate | Votes | % | ±% |
|---|---|---|---|---|
| Labour Co-op | Jodi Clements* | 616 | 41.5 | −22.5 |
| Reform | Colleen Dickinson-Jones | 540 | 36.4 | 28.5 |
| Green | Wayne Fitzharris | 186 | 12.5 | N/A |
| Conservative | Barry Walker | 143 | 9.6 | −19.5 |
| Majority | | 76 | | |
| Turnout | | 1495 | 41.4 | |
| Registered electors | | 3,608 | | |
| Labour Co-op hold | | Swing | | |

=== Overton ===
Overton
| Party | Candidate | Votes | % | ±% |
|---|---|---|---|---|
| Reform | Jordan Fox | 874 | 44.6 | 33.0 |
| Labour Co-op | Scott Brerton* | 599 | 30.6 | −21.5 |
| Conservative | Judith McKelvey | 257 | 13.1 | −23.2 |
| Green | Zoe Thomas | 230 | 11.7 | |
| Majority | | 275 | | |
| Rejected ballots | | 7 | | |
| Turnout | | 1967 | 41.8 | |
| Registered electors | | 4,707 | | |
| Reform gain from Labour Co-op | | Swing | | |

=== Peel ===
Peel
| Party | Candidate | Votes | % | ±% |
|---|---|---|---|---|
| Reform | Ashley Joynes | 377 | 42.0 | 35.9 |
| Green | Lex Kristan | 197 | 21.9 | N/A |
| Conservative | Joyce Plummer* | 165 | 18.4 | −6.6 |
| Labour | Malcolm Pritchard | 159 | 17.7 | −51.2 |
| Majority | | 180 | | |
| Rejected ballots | | 4 | | |
| Turnout | | 902 | 30.2 | |
| Registered electors | | 2,991 | | |
| Reform gain from Labour | | Swing | | |

=== Rishton ===
Rishton
| Party | Candidate | Votes | % | ±% |
|---|---|---|---|---|
| Reform | Lance Parkinson | 903 | 49.8 | 44.7 |
| Conservative | Carole Haythornthwaite | 375 | 20.7 | −11.3 |
| Labour Co-op | Bernard Dawson* | 307 | 16.9 | −17.6 |
| Green | Lee MacNeall | 227 | 12.5 | N/A |
| Majority | | 528 | | |
| Rejected ballots | | 13 | | |
| Turnout | | 1829 | 37.3 | |
| Registered electors | | 4,908 | | |
| Reform gain from Labour Co-op | | Swing | | |

=== Spring Hill ===
Independent Sohail Asghar, was previously suspended from the Green Party back in February, after having given up the Green Party whip due to "an investigation" in December 2025.

Spring Hill
| Party | Candidate | Votes | % | ±% |
|---|---|---|---|---|
| Independent | Sohail Asghar | 428 | 29.3 | N/A |
| Labour Co-op | Graham Jones | 405 | 27.7 | −24.9 |
| Conservative | Saeed Ullah | 369 | 25.2 | −22.2 |
| Reform | Jan Evans | 261 | 17.8 | N/A |
| Majority | | 23 | | |
| Rejected ballots | | 8 | | |
| Turnout | | 1472 | 38.4 | |
| Registered electors | | 3,835 | | |
| Independent gain from Labour Co-op | | Swing | | |

=== St Andrew's ===
St Andrew's
| Party | Candidate | Votes | % | ±% |
|---|---|---|---|---|
| Reform | Gaynor Hargreaves | 492 | 40.1 | N/A |
| Conservative | Peter Britcliffe | 432 | 35.2 | −18.2 |
| Green | Julie Stubbins | 157 | 12.8 | N/A |
| Labour | Jade Wellings | 147 | 12.0 | −34.6 |
| Majority | | 60 | | |
| Rejected ballots | | 8 | | |
| Turnout | | 1236 | 36.8 | |
| Registered electors | | 3,359 | | |
| Reform gain from Conservative | | Swing | | |

=== St Oswald's ===
St Oswald's
| Party | Candidate | Votes | % | ±% |
|---|---|---|---|---|
| Reform | Paul Brown | 950 | 44.4 | N/A |
| Conservative | Vinette Davitt | 860 | 40.2 | N/A |
| Labour | Caitlin Pritchard | 329 | 15.4 | N/A |
| Majority | | 90 | | |
| Rejected ballots | | 16 | | |
| Turnout | | 2157 | 45.4 | |
| Registered electors | | 4,747 | | |
| Reform gain from Conservative | | Swing | | |

== Post-election changes ==
=== Huncoat by-election ===
The Labour Party held the seat on an increased vote share compared to the May 2026 election. The result also represented the highest vote share for Restore Britain in a council by-election outside of Great Yarmouth.

Huncoat by-election, 12 November 2026
| Party | Candidate | Votes | % | ±% |
|---|---|---|---|---|
| Labour | Jackie Rawstron | 318 | 34.4 | +10.5 |
| Reform | Anna Stanislawska | 275 | 29.8 | −19.4 |
| Restore | Mark Conlon | 257 | 27.8 | New |
| Conservative | Shahed Mehmood | 74 | 8.0 | −2.4 |
| Majority | | 43 | 4.6 | −20.7 |
| Turnout | | 924 | 26.3 | −14.3 |
| Labour hold | | Swing | +15.0 | |
