= Sara Britcliffe =

British Conservative politician

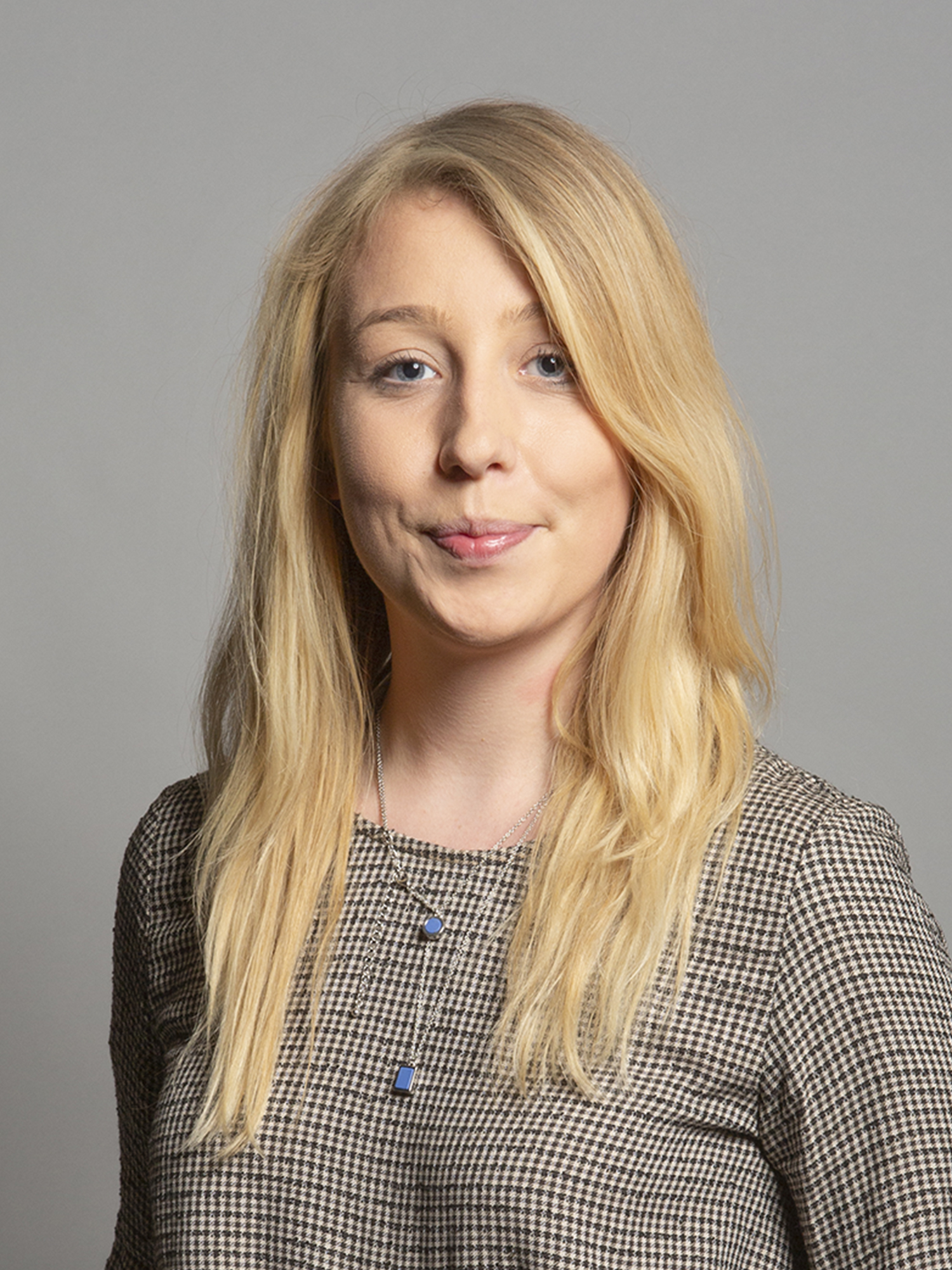
- Official portrait, 2019

Deputy Chairman of the Conservative Party
- In office 13 November 2023 – 5 July 2024
- Leader: Rishi Sunak

Vice Chairman of the Conservative Party for Youth
- In office 30 September 2022 – 13 November 2023
- Leader: Liz Truss; Rishi Sunak

Member of Parliament for Hyndburn
- In office 12 December 2019 – 30 May 2024
- Preceded by: Graham Jones
- Succeeded by: Sarah Smith

Personal details
- Born: Sara Alice Britcliffe; 21 February 1995 (age 31) Hyndburn, Lancashire, England
- Party: Conservative
- Education: University of Manchester (BA)
- Website: www.sarabritcliffe.org.uk

Sara Alice Britcliffe (born 21 February 1995) is a British Conservative Party politician, who served as the Member of Parliament (MP) for Hyndburn from 2019 to 2024. At the age of 24, she was the youngest Conservative MP elected in the election, and the first to represent the constituency since 1992.

She was also previously a councillor on the Hyndburn Borough Council between 2018 and 2021. She was the Deputy Chairman of the Conservative Party for Campaigning and Candidates from November 2023 until July 2024.

== Early life and education ==
Sara Britcliffe was born on 21 February 1995, and attended St Christopher's Church of England High School, Accrington. Her father, Peter, was the councillor for the Oswaldtwistle division on Lancashire County Council. She has two older brothers. Her mother, Gabrielle Kroger, died in 2004, when Britcliffe was nine years old. She studied modern languages at the University of Manchester.

== Political career ==
Britcliffe served in the ceremonial role of mayoress between 2017 and 2018, alongside her father, who was the mayor on Hyndburn Borough Council. He stood down from the council in 2018. She was elected as a councillor for the ward of St. Andrews (previously represented by her father) at the 2018 Hyndburn Borough Council election. Britcliffe did not stand in the next election in 2021 and her seat was won by her father. Prior to her political career, she managed a sandwich shop in Oswaldtwistle.

== Career ==
Britcliffe was selected as the Conservative candidate for the constituency of Hyndburn on 6 November 2019. Her father had previously contested the seat at the general elections of 1997 and 2001.

At the 2019 general election, Britcliffe was elected to Parliament as MP for Hyndburn with 48.5% of the vote and a majority of 2,951. At the age of 24, she was the youngest Conservative MP elected in the election.

Britcliffe travelled to Pakistan in February 2020, as part of an all-party delegation. Britcliffe was a member of the Women and Equalities Committee between March 2020 and March 2021.

On 28 April 2020, Britcliffe became the first MP to deliver her maiden speech from outside the House of Commons, after parliament adopted a system in which members could contribute to debates virtually during the COVID-19 pandemic. She was a member of the parliamentary council of the centre-right think tank the Northern Policy Foundation, and of the Northern Research Group. She became a member of the Transport Select Committee in July 2023. On 29 January 2021, she became a Parliamentary Private Secretary (PPS) in the Department for Education. She resigned as PPS on 6 July 2022, in protest at Prime Minister Boris Johnson's handling of the Chris Pincher scandal. Britcliffe endorsed Nadhim Zahawi in the July 2022 Conservative Party leadership election. After Zahawi was eliminated, she backed Liz Truss.

On 30 September 2022, Britcliffe became the Conservative Party's Vice-Chairman for Youth. In this role, she highlighted the importance of the party engaging with issues that affect young people, including housing and childcare, particularly given its poor poll ratings with this group in the same year. In November 2023, Britcliffe became Deputy Chairman for Campaigning and Candidates. In December 2023, she called for more government support to combat alcoholism after disclosing that her late mother had suffered from it.

Britcliffe ran for re-election in the 2024 United Kingdom general election and lost her seat to the Labour candidate Sarah Smith. Four months later, Britcliffe and Antony Higginbotham (a fellow former Conservative MP), founded political consultancy Polaris Partners.

Parliament of the United Kingdom
Preceded by Graham Jones	Member of Parliament for Hyndburn; 2019––2024	Succeeded by Sarah Smith
