= Korkin =

Korkin (Russian: Коркин, from корка meaning crust) is a Russian masculine surname, its feminine counterpart is Korkina. It may refer to

- Aleksandr Korkin (1837–1908), Russian mathematician
- Gennady Korkin (1963–2025), Russian association football player

== See also ==
- Khorkin
