= James Mawdsley =

Suspended Catholic priest and activist

The Reverend James Mawdsley
- Church: Catholic Church

Orders
- Ordination: 2 July 2016 by Guido Pozzo

Personal details
- Born: James Rupert Russell Mawdsley; 1973 (age 52–53) Lancashire, United Kingdom
- Denomination: Catholic (Roman Rite)

James Rupert Russell Mawdsley is a traditionalist Catholic priest and Holocaust denier, now suspended a divinis, who before seminary was a prisoner of conscience in Burma. He is a dual citizen of the United Kingdom and Australia.

== Early life ==
Mawdsley was born in 1973. His parents are David and Diana, and he has three siblings. He gave up his study at the University of Bristol, and while backpacking met Burmese refugees who engaged his interest in the plight of ethnic minorities in Burma.

He married Elizabeth in January 2005. They honeymooned in Rome, where their union was blessed by Pope John Paul II. The Catholic church subsequently issued a declaration of nullity.

== Burmese activism and imprisonment ==
Mawdsley took up teaching English at a Burmese refugee camp, and became further involved when government forces burnt down the school. He was arrested three times for his involvement, and deported three times. The second arrest was in May 1998, for handing out stickers and playing songs for the pro democracy movement. On arrest, he was tortured for fifteen hours, and sentenced to five years imprisonment, which was suspended after 98 days.

He was rearrested a third time in September 1999, for illegal entry and sedition, and was sentenced to seventeen years in jail. His imprisonment was held to be arbitrary by the U.N. Working Group on Arbitrary Detention in 2000. This time, he spent 415 days in solitary confinement, before his release in October 2000, after pressure was exerted by the United Kingdom Foreign Office on the authorities in Myanmar.

== External activism and politics ==
Mawdsley's memoir of his experiences in Burma, The Heart Must Break: The Fight for Democracy and Truth in Burma, was published in 2001; in the United States, the book was titled The Iron Road: A Stand for Truth and Democracy in Burma.

In February 2003, Mawdsley co authored New Ground, a pamphlet advocating foreign policy based around freedom, dignity and the rule of law. This document has helped give rise to the Conservative Party Human Rights Commission, founded in October 2005. At the 2004 European Parliament Election, Mawdsley was a candidate on the Conservative Party list for the North West England. However, he was placed ninth on the list, so was not one of the three Conservatives who won a seat.

In February 2005, he was selected as the prospective parliamentary candidate for the constituency of Hyndburn, due to the previous candidate deciding not to stand, overseeing unsuccessful campaigns in 1997 and 2001. In the 2005 General Election, which took place in May 2005, he lost to sitting MP Greg Pope by 5,587 votes. Ken Hargreaves supported his bid into becoming the next MP for Hyndburn. His wife suffered an ectopic pregnancy on the eve of the General Election.

== Priesthood ==
From 2016 to 2022, Mawdsley was a Catholic priest of the Priestly Fraternity of Saint Peter (FSSP), having studied to become a priest at the FSSP seminary at Wigratzbad in Germany. He was ordained to the priesthood on 2 July 2016, and was assistant priest at St Mary's Church, Warrington in Cheshire, England through October 2017. From November 2017 through August 2018, Mawdsley was assigned to the FSSP apostolate in Reading, Berkshire, where he served the Latin Mass centres of Bedford and Chesham Bois. In September 2018, Mawdsley was assigned to the FSSP apostolate in Vienna, Austria. From October 2020 until April 2021, Mawdsley was assigned to the FSSP apostolate in Cologne, Federal Republic of Germany.

In response to Pope Francis' promulgation of his motu proprio Traditionis custodes on 16 July 2021 restricting the use of the traditional Mass and the 18 December 2021 clarification on its implementation released by Bishop Arthur Roche, prefect of the Congregation for Divine Worship and the Discipline of the Sacraments, Mawdsley informed his superiors in the FSSP of his intention to leave the Fraternity in order to be able to speak out against the motu proprio without fear of reprisal from Church authorities. After being suspended a divinis by FSSP leadership for, by his own admission, 'illegitimate absence' from his assigned duties, Mawdsley formally broke with the order in January 2022; shortly thereafter, he released a video on YouTube publicly castigating Francis and the Church hierarchy for their 'intention to eradicate the traditional liturgy.'

== Holocaust denial ==
In March 2025, Mawdsley denied the Holocaust on the white nationalist livestream The Backlash, saying "The Holocaust is a lie. It didn’t happen." He also said:

Many Jews suffered as they were being expelled from Europe by the Nazis, but there was no genocidal plan from Hitler or the Germans to annihilate the Jews. That's all a lie. And that's what they wielded then as a weapon against the Church".

In a discussion on the Good Friday liturgy on the Catholic Unscripted podcast, he described the intervention of Jewish figures in the 1960s to persuade Pope John XXIII to change the Church’s position on "the Jews" as successful infiltration:

I think that the Jews have basically infiltrated the church, destroyed her liturgy, her dogma, her morals, and unless we call that out and overcome that and be honest about the governance in our Catholic faith then things are only going to get worse.

Mawdsley's conspiracy theory of Jewish infiltration was strongly denied by Joseph Shaw, the chairman of the Latin Mass Society.

== Publications ==
- Adam's Deep Sleep: The Passion of Jesus Christ Prefigured in the Old Testament, New Old, 2022. ASIN 1739581601
- Crushing satan's head: The Virgin Mary's Victory over the Antichrist Foretold in the Old Testament, New Old, 2022. ASIN B0B3N9BCP8
- Crucifixion to Creation: Roots of the Traditional Mass Traced back to Paradise, New Old, 2023. ASIN 1739581628
- If You Believed Moses (Vol 1): The Conversion of the Jews Promised in the Old Testament, New Old, 2023. ASIN B0BS9GBV63
- If You Believed Moses (Vol 2): The Conversion of the Jews as the Close of History, New Old, 2023 (available on Lulu and barnesandnoble.com).
- Divine Depths: The Holy Eucharist Hidden in Sunday Vespers, New Old, 2024 ISBN 979-8-3435-6921-6
