= St Christopher's Church of England High School, Accrington =

Coordinates: 53.7612°N 2.3774°W

St Christopher's Church of England High School

Location
- Queens Road West; Accrington, Lancashire, BB5 4FF; England

Information
- Type: Academy
- Religious affiliation: Church of England
- Established: 1958
- Department for Education URN: 137421 Tables
- Ofsted: Reports
- Principal: Richard Jones
- Gender: coeducational
- Age: 11 to 18
- Enrolment: 1236
- Website: www.st-christophers.org

St Christopher's C of E High is a Church of England High School with academy status located north of Accrington in Lancashire, north-west England. The school was founded in 1958, and in 2005, the school earned Technology College status.

The Sunday Times ranked it 49th in 2007, and 30th in 2006, in its "Top 50 state secondary school with no sixth form" category. The school has received an 'Outstanding' inspection report by Ofsted.

It now caters for around 1236 pupils, aged 11–18, drawn from the Accrington, Blackburn and Burnley areas, following recent expansion work, including a large sports building, The Ian King Sports Hall (named after Ian King, who was a respected Physical Education teacher who died in October 2009), and a new sixth form, officially opened in September 2010.

Alasdair Coates served as headteacher for 21 years, from 1992 until July 2013, which made him the longest serving head of a church school in Britain. Richard Jones, formerly the deputy headteacher, took over the role of headteacher, with Paul Cuff taking the role of deputy headteacher and head of the Sixth Form Centre.

== Notable former pupils ==
- Jon Anderson, Co-founder and lead singer of progressive rock band Yes
- Rachel Brown, women's footballer
- Julia Haworth, actress
- Graham Jones, MP for Hyndburn 2010-2019
- Sara Britcliffe, MP for Hyndburn 2019-2024
