= Walter Marsden =

English sculptor (1882–1969)

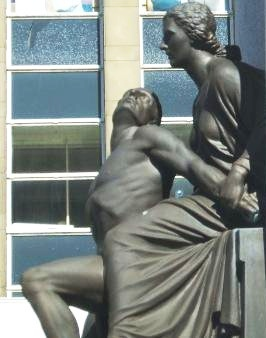
- Part of the Bolton War Memorial-Peace restraining war.
- Born: 1883; Church, Lancashire, England
- Died: 1969 (aged 85–86)
- Education: Accrington Technical School, Manchester Municipal College of Art, Royal College of Art
- Known for: Sculpture
- Notable work: Sculpture, war memorials (mainly in Lancashire)

Walter Marsden MC (1882–1969) was an English sculptor born in Lancashire. He saw active service in the First World War and was awarded the Military Cross and Bar. He was awarded a civil pension by Queen Elizabeth 2 for services to sculpture. He was an associate of the Royal college of Art. He served in the Home Guard during WW 2 and worked for the Ministry of Home Security Camouflage Unit. Marsden assisted with the restoration work following the bombing of Coventry Cathedral.

After the war, like many other sculptors who were also ex-servicemen, he carried out sculptural work on war memorials. All but two of these were erected in Lancashire.

Marsden also spoke at speaking engagements about a wide variety of art-related topics. In 1944 he became an instructor at Saint Martin's School of Art and continued teaching until about 1952.

== Personal and career life ==
Walter Marsden, the son of a blacksmith, was born in Church near Accrington in Lancashire, England in 1882.

Starting in 1901 he was an apprentice at the Accrington Brick and Tile Company, whose owners, the McAlpine family, recognised his talent, and encouraged him to study at the Accrington Technical School. From there, Marsden secured a place at the Manchester Municipal College of Art in about 1908. In the 1911 census he gave his occupation as a "clay modeller".

He served as an officer in the Loyal North Lancashire Regiment and was awarded a Military Cross fighting in the Third Battle of Ypres in 1917. He was later taken prisoner at Cambrai, France, and sent to a prisoner of war camp.

After the war he returned to his studies and attended the Royal College of Art between 1919 and 1920 where Édouard Lantéri was one of his instructors.

From 1930 until 1941, when he resigned, Marsden was a member of the Art Workers Guild. From 1930 to 1941 he was a member of the council of the Royal Society of British Sculptors; He became a Fellow of the Society in 1938 and remained so until 1956. Marsden was a Saint Martin's School of Art temporary instructor starting in 1944. He taught modelling. He was a full-time instructor from 1948 to 1952, his work including teaching sculpture.

Marsden died in August 1969.

== Works ==
=== Notable work ===
==== St Annes on Sea War Memorial ====
Marsden carried out the sculptural work for the war memorial at St Annes on Sea in Lancashire. The memorial was unveiled on 12 October 1924. One of the figures to the side of the central column is a soldier described as "with twisting body and clenched fist", and the second shows a seated woman holding a baby. The Imperial War Museum holds a maquette of the soldier.

In the book "A Century of Remembrance", a description of the work includes the following: " ... a mother with a child on her knee and the artist wished to convey that she had just been told of her husband's death and in her shock barely noticed the child's pleadings.

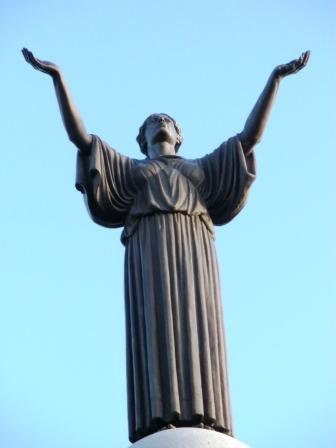
Figure of "Victory" on St Annes on Sea War Memorial.

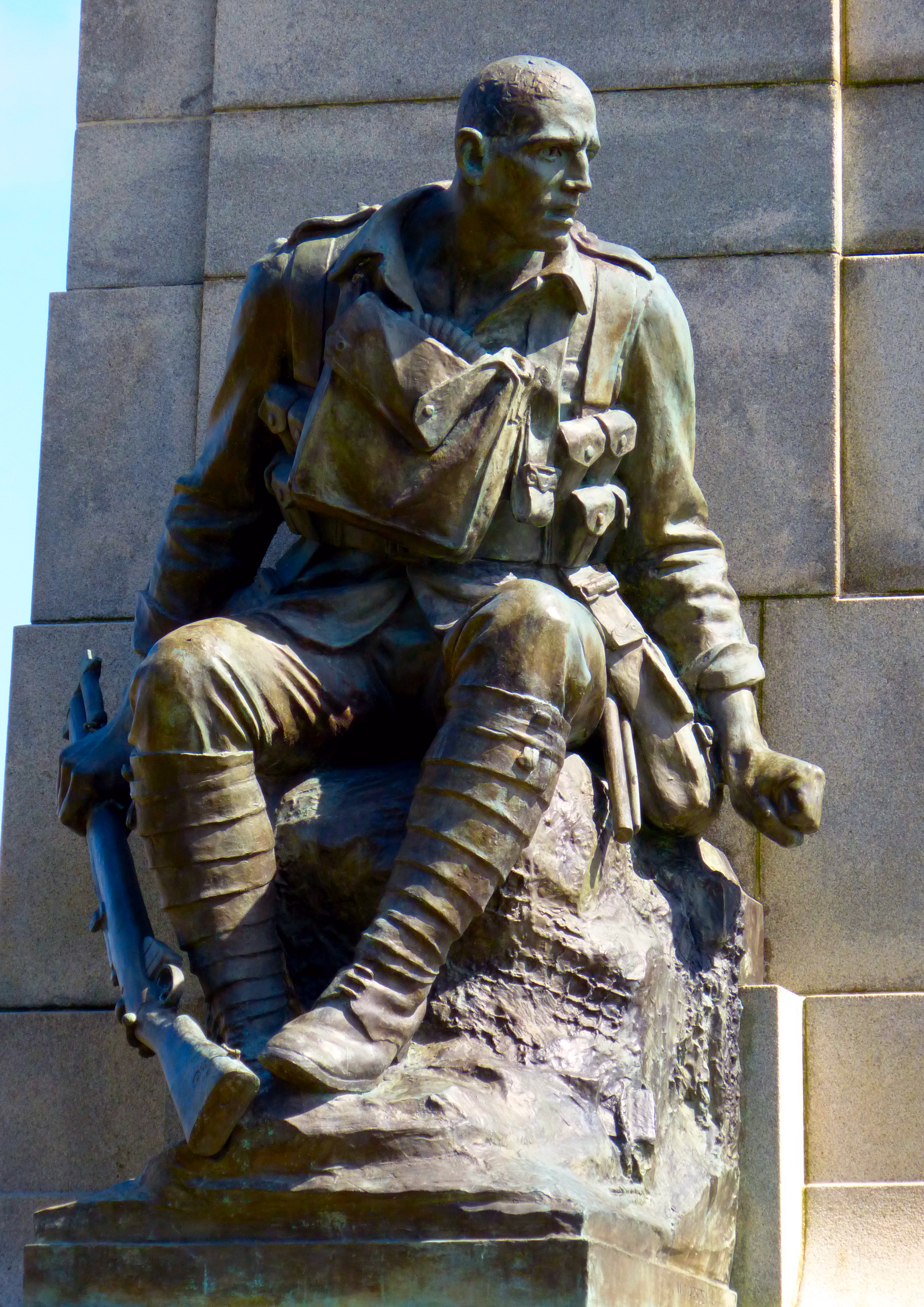
The contorted soldier

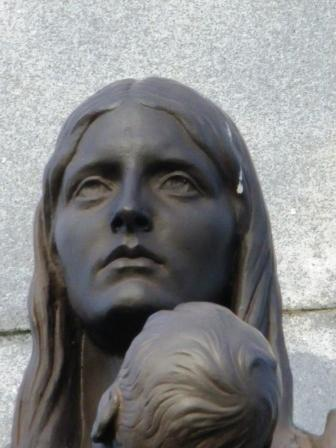
Mother on St Annes on Sea War Memorial.

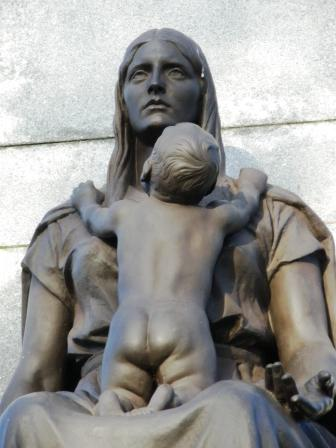
The mother and child.

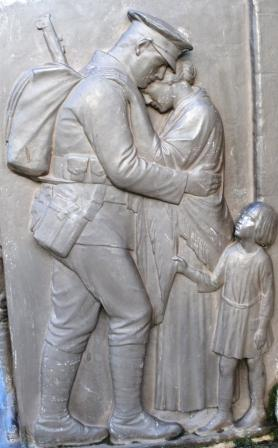
Relief on the St Annes on Sea War Memorial. A soldier says farewell to his wife and child.

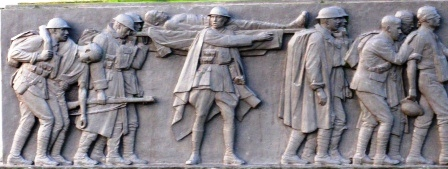
Relief on the St Annes on Sea War Memorial. Wounded men are led from the battlefield.

=== War memorials ===
Place	Location	Notes and References
Bolton War Memorial	Bolton, Lancashire	This memorial was unveiled by the 17th Earl of Derby on 14 July 1928. Part of the inscription on the memorial reads: "Tell ye your children / Our brothers died to win a better / World our part must be to strive/for truth goodwill and peace that / their sacrifice be not in vain / Lest we forget." and another "In undying memory of the men / and women of Bolton who gave / their lives in The Great War / 1914–1919 / 1939–1945".
Bude War Memorial	Bude, Cornwall	Marsden also worked on the Bude War Memorial in Cornwall. This comprises a tapered square stone pillar on a single step, surmounted by representations of the "TOC H" lamp and stone flame. Plaques with names inscribed are around the base of the column. World War I and World War II inscriptions are located about the base of column and base step, with the Sword of Sacrifice on each side of the inscription. Carved foliate plaques are on each side of the top of the column. This memorial was unveiled in 1922 by the Lord Lieutenant of Cornwall.
Church War Memorial	Church, Lancashire	The war memorial at Church, Marsden's birthplace, features a Portland stone figure representing "Peace". It was unveiled on 18 September 1923 by Lieutenant Colonel G.C.H. Bolton. This memorial stands in Gatty Park in front of Elmfield Hall, where a plaque made by Marsden again commemorates those lost in the Great War. The inscription on the main memorial reads "1914–1918 / They whom this monument commemorates were numbered amongst those who, at the call of King and Country left all that was dear to them; Endured Hardness; Faced danger and finally passed out of sight of men by the giving up of their own lives that others might live in freedom. Let those who come after see to it that their names be not forgotten / 1939–1945"
Heywood War Memorial	Heywood, Lancashire	The war memorial at Heywood in Lancashire was unveiled on 22 August 1925. A statue representing peace stands in front of a cenotaph. Her head is bowed and she bears a laurel wreath. The inscription on the memorial reads "To the / Men of Heywood / Who gave their lives / for us during The/Great War 1914–1918".
Tottington War Memorial	Tottington, Lancashire	The war memorial at Tottington includes two badges designed by Marsden and the words: "We owe more tears to these dead men than time shall see us pay" which are adapted from Shakespeare's Julius Caesar. One badge features the rays of a rising sun (representing regeneration) and the second a dove (representing peace).
The White Church Fairhaven URC Memorial	Fairhaven, Lancashire	Marsden carved an angel bearing the body of a soldier on the face of this church's pulpit.

=== Other sculpture ===
Place	Location	Notes and References
Designs for Door Knocker, Handle and Letter Box	1911	This work was made by Marsden in 1911 and exhibited at the City of Manchester Art Gallery in 1912, with other student's works from the Manchester Municipal School of Art.
Design for Platform End of a Concert Room	Whereabouts unknown	This 1910 design by Marsden was exhibited at the City of Manchester Art Gallery in 1912, with other student's works from the Manchester Municipal School of Art.
Detail of Design for Notice Board	Whereabouts unknown	A 1911 design by Marsden in 1911 which was exhibited at the City of Manchester Art Gallery in 1912, with other student's works from the Manchester Municipal School of Art.
Figure from Life	Whereabouts unknown	The modelled figure was made by Marsden in 1911 and exhibited at the City of Manchester Art Gallery in 1912, with other student's works from the Manchester Municipal School of Art.
Figure from Life (anatomized)	Whereabouts unknown	The modeled figure was made by Marsden in 1911 and exhibited at the City of Manchester Art Gallery in 1912, with other student's works from the Manchester Municipal School of Art.
John Walter Gregory memorial	near Malden, Essex	The John Walter Gregory Memorial Tablet, located in the Woodham Walter Church in Essex, was made by Walter Marsden in 1936. The coats of arms of the University of London and University of Glasgow are inscribed on the memorial.
The Victim		This bronze sculpture, half size female, was exhibited in 1938 at the Palace of Arts Empire Exhibition held in Scotland. First exhibited in a private view at artist's stodio in 1920 (RA archive, full ref to follow)
King Albert of the Belgians	Imperial War Museum	Plaster bust, 1937

== Speaking engagements ==
As part of the Art Workers Guild, Marsdon held numerous speaking engagements between 1933 and 1938. Some of the topics included Medieval art, American sculpture, art criticism, and Pre-Raphaelite sculptors.

== Exhibitions ==
Marsden placed his works in the following exhibitions:

1912 – Multiple works at City of Manchester Art Gallery, Exhibition of Recent Works Executed by Students of the Municipal School of Art.
1915 – 1961 – The Exhibition of the Royal Academy of Arts (Summer Exhibition). He exhibited a total of 25 times throughout this period.
1925 – The Royal Glasgow Institute of the Fine Arts Annual Exhibition
1938 – Palace of Arts Empire Exhibition Scotland.

== Gallery ==
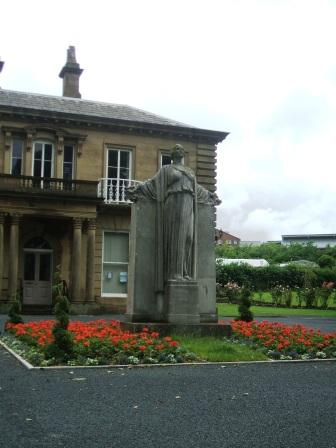
War Memorial at Church

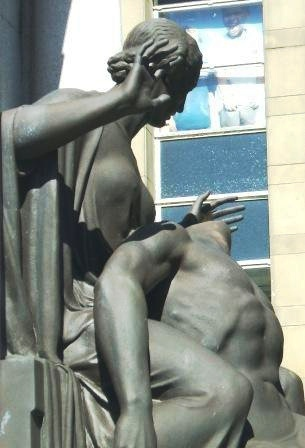
Part of Bolton War Memorial-Peace seeing the horrors of war.

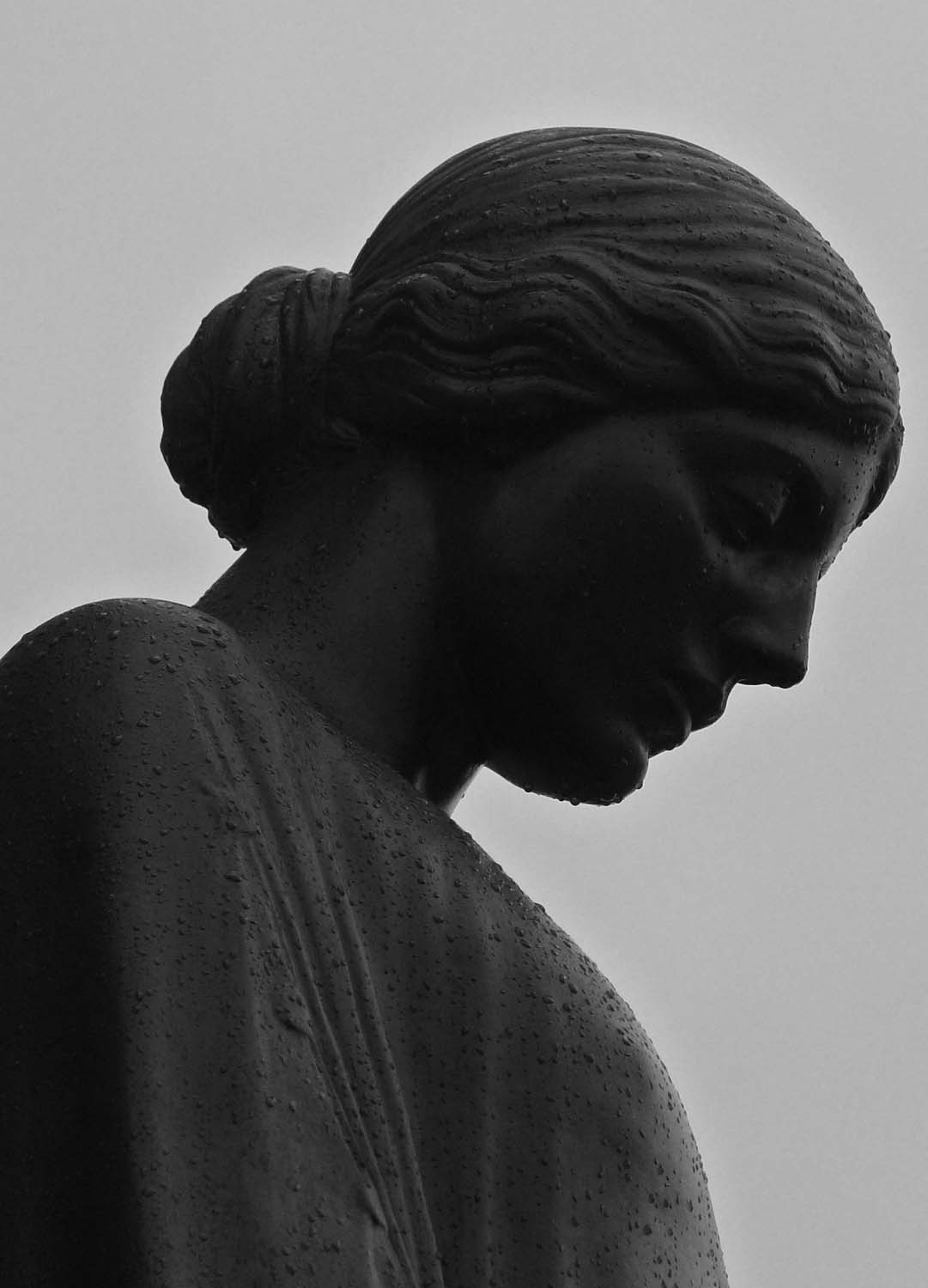
Heywood War Memorial. Photograph shown courtesy Glyn Fitzsimmons.

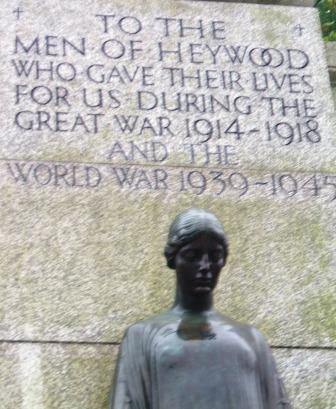
Heywood War Memorial. Photograph shown courtesy Glyn Fitzsimmons.

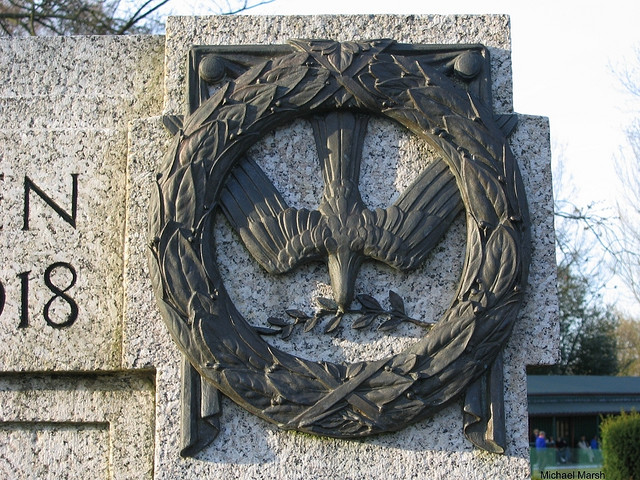
One of badges on Tottington War Memorial. Photograph shown courtesy mmswamp.

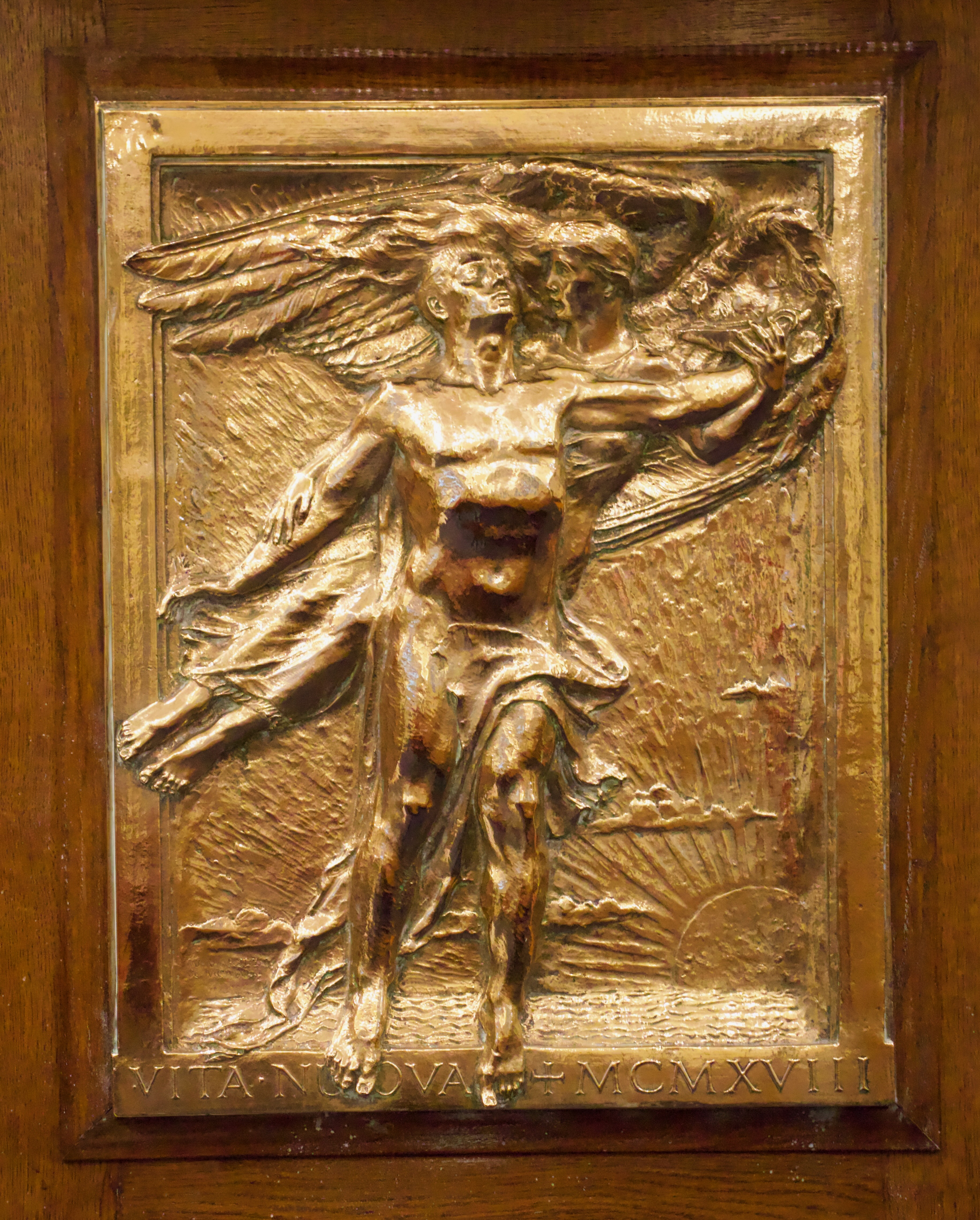
Central panel at The White Church Fairhaven URC Memorial pulpit
