= Khorkin =

Khorkin or Horkin (Russian: Хоркин) is a Russian masculine surname, its feminine counterpart is Khorkina or Horkina. Notable people with the surname include:

- Dmitry Khorkin (born 1986), Ukrainian radio and television host
- Kevin Horkin, British businessman, journalist and TV presenter
- Svetlana Khorkina (born 1979), Russian artistic gymnast
