= Rishton =

Town in Lancashire, England

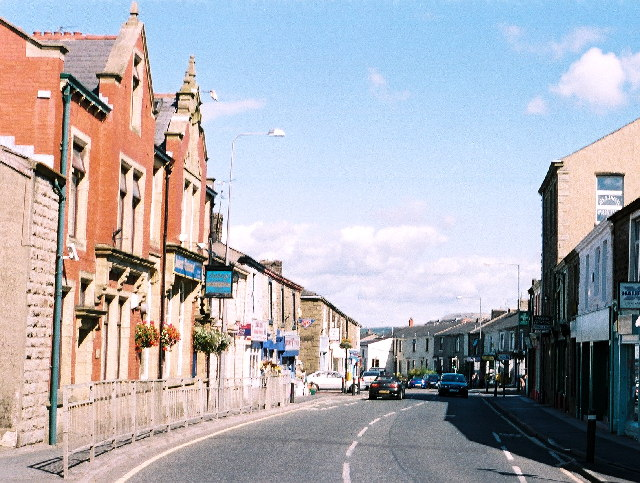
- Rishton High Street

- Shown within Hyndburn Location within Lancashire
- Area: 0.44 sq mi (1.1 km^{2})
- Population: 6,625 (2011)
  - Density: 15,057/sq mi (5,814/km^{2})
- OS grid reference: SD725305
- District: Hyndburn
- Shire county: Lancashire
- Region: North West
- Country: England
- Sovereign state: United Kingdom
- Post town: BLACKBURN
- Postcode district: BB1
- Dialling code: 01254
- Police: Lancashire
- Fire: Lancashire
- Ambulance: North West
- UK Parliament: Hyndburn

Rishton /ˈrɪʃtən/ is a town in the Hyndburn district of Lancashire, England, about 2 miles (3 km) west of Clayton-le-Moors and 4 miles (6 km) north east of Blackburn. It was an urban district from about 1894 to 1974. The population at the census of 2011 was 6,625.

== History ==
Its name means “village (or farmstead) where rushes grow”.

In late 1776, a handloom weavers shop in Rishton, belonging to Thomas Duxbury may have been the first place that the cotton cloth calico was woven for sale in Great Britain.

Rishton Colliery 53°45′58″N 2°24′50″W on the Burnley Coalfield was begun by P.W. Pickup Ltd in late November 1884 and mining continued until 1941. A tramroad from the pit connected to a coaling wharf on the canal. The National Coal Board used it as a pumping station from 1955 until 1970.

== Governance ==
The two tiers of local government are Hyndburn Borough Council (a non-metropolitan district with borough status) and Lancashire County Council. Prior to the creation of Hyndburn district in 1974, Rishton had been an urban district, with its own council. It is not within a civil parish. Rishton currently has five elected representatives on the local authorities, all of whom are Labour: two County Councillors (Miles Parkinson and Jenny Molineux) and three Borough Councillors (Michael Miller, Jeff Scales, Kate Walsh).

Rishton is represented in the House of Commons as part of the Hyndburn constituency.

== Geography ==
Rishton is situated in an area of low moorland north east of Blackburn and north west of Accrington. Its elevation above sea level varies from 250 feet (76 m) in the east, where Norden Brook flows into the River Hyndburn, to 785 feet (239 m) on Rishton Height, north west of the town.

=== Geology ===
Around 0.7 miles from the town is a former sandstone quarry, known locally as Star Delph Quarry. Its use as a sandstone quarry ended in 1897. Part of the quarry contains rocks formed around 314 to 315 million years ago in the Carboniferous period, These rocks contain an imprint from where the roots of a Lepidodendron, which are known as Stigmaria. This quarry is a Site of Special Scientific Interest, and so it is protected by law with those that damage the site facing fines. The exposed rock layers are Fletcher Bank Grit (a subgroup of the Millstone Grit).

== Demography ==
The 2001 census recorded a population of 7,350, in 2,973 households. 97% of the population were in the White British ethnic group.

The 2011 census recorded a population of 6,625 - a decrease of 9.8% from ten years earlier. 96% of the population were in the White British ethnic group. 74.8% of residents identified only as English, while 11.2% identified only as British, and 10.9% identified as British and English. A majority of residents identified as Christian (76.6%), with 16.4% identifying as irreligious, as well as small minorities of Muslims (0.8%) and Buddhists (0.6%) existing in the town.

== Transport ==
The main road through Rishton is the A678 Blackburn to Burnley Road; there is also the B6535 (formerly A6064), which connects the town to Great Harwood. The Blackburn Southern Bypass section of the M65 motorway opened in December 1997, bypassing the A678.

In the 19th century, the Leeds and Liverpool Canal was a major transport route in the area. The section of the canal through Rishton was completed in 1810. Rishton Reservoir, which provides water to the canal, was built in 1828. The East Lancashire Railway, which was opened in 1848, crossed the reservoir on a viaduct until 1858; it is now on an embankment.

Rishton railway station, south west of the town centre, is on the East Lancashire line. As of 2018, the route is operated by Northern, and consists of one train per hour between Blackpool South and Colne. Bus services are more frequent, and include the Hyndburn Circular routes and Route 152, both operated by Blackburn Bus Company.

== Sport ==
=== Cricket ===
Rishton has over the years been famous for its cricket team, based at Rishton Cricket Club. Notable professionals who have played for the club include Viv Richards in 1987. Other former professionals include former England coach Duncan Fletcher, Michael Holding (former West Indies international), Aussie fast bowler Jason Gillespie, former South African cricket captain Allan Donald and Sri Lankan right-handed batsman and right arm offbreak bowler Kumar Dharmasena.

See Rishton Cricket Club

=== Football ===
Rishton United FC provides junior and senior football for over 20 teams for both children and adults. The football club is currently developing its own ground known as the Primetime Project located next to the canal behind Hyndburn Academy. This will see the club have its own grass pitches and in time, clubhouse and parking. The club has teams ranging from nippers (U7s) through to U16s and men's senior teams.

=== Golf ===
Rishton Golf Club is located off Petre Crescent, and is an eleven-hole course.

=== Sailing ===
Sailing has taken place on Rishton Reservoir since the start of the 20th century. East Lancashire Sailing Club is based at the reservoir, and is a RYA Recognised Training Centre.

== Culture ==
=== Leisure and tourism ===
The facilities at Cutwood Park, between Blackburn Road and the reservoir include a football pitch and a children's playground.

=== Churches ===
- Rishton Christian Fellowship, Commercial Street.
- Rishton Baptist Church, Commercial Street
- Rishton Methodist Church, Albert Street
- St Peter and St Paul Church (Anglican), Blackburn Road
- Primitive Methodist Church, School Street
- United Methodist Church, Mary Street

== Education ==
There are three primary schools in Rishton: St. Peter and St. Paul's Church of England Primary School, St. Charles' Roman Catholic Primary School and Rishton Methodist Primary School. There is also one high school: The Hyndburn Academy.

== Notable people ==
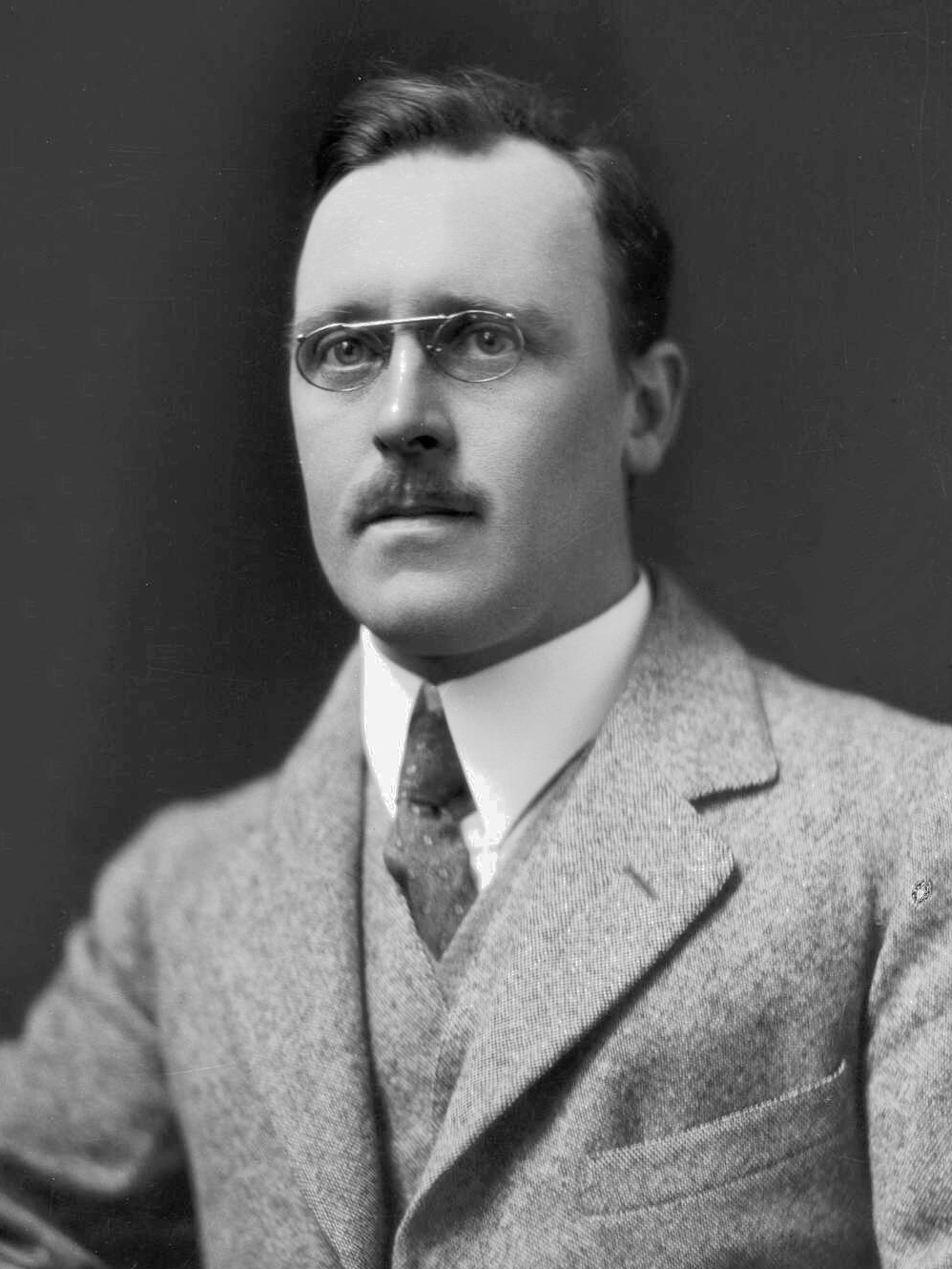
Ernest Marsden, 1921

- Ernest Marsden (1889–1970), an English-New Zealand physicist and assistant to Ernest Rutherford, the a pioneering researcher in atomic and nuclear physics.
- George Tomlinson (1890–1952), Education Minister, 1947 / 1951; MP for Farnworth 1938 / 1952.
- Hardy Falconer Parsons (1897–1917) British Army second Lieutenant, awarded the Victoria Cross
- Sir Frank Kenyon Roberts (1907–1998), an eminent diplomat who lived in the town in the early 1920s.
- Walter Hoyle (1922–2000), artist, known for his prints, watercolours and illustration.
- Christine Walkden (born 1955) a British television presenter on gardening, appears on BBC's The One Show
- Wendy Ellis Somes (born ca.1955) former principal ballerina with the Royal Ballet

=== Sport ===
- Martin Dobson (born 1948), footballer, played 661 games, over 400 in two spells at Burnley
- Mark Felix (born 1966), a Grenadian-English retired strongman competitor
- Brett Ormerod (born 1976), footballer, played 564 games, over 200 in two spells at Blackpool

== See also ==
- Listed buildings in Rishton
