= Greg Pope =

British politician

Member of Parliament for Hyndburn
- In office 9 April 1992 – 12 April 2010
- Preceded by: Ken Hargreaves
- Succeeded by: Graham Jones

Personal details
- Born: 29 August 1960 (age 66) Blackburn, England, United Kingdom
- Party: Labour
- Spouse: Catherine Fallon
- Children: 3
- Education: University of Hull
- Occupation: Assistant General Secretary, Catholic Bishops' Conference of England & Wales

Gregory James Pope (born 29 August 1960) is a British Labour Party politician, who was the Member of Parliament (MP) for Hyndburn from 1992, until retiring at the general election of 2010. He was a government whip from 1997 until 2001.

== Early life ==
Pope was born and raised in Great Harwood, the only son of Sam and Sheila Pope. He went to St Marys College R.C. Grammar School on Shear Brow in Blackburn, now St Mary's Sixth Form College, Blackburn. He studied politics at the University of Hull, graduating in 1981.

Pope was elected to serve on Hyndburn Borough Council in 1984 until 1988, and he also served briefly on Blackburn Borough Council from 1989 to 1990.

== Parliamentary career ==
Pope unsuccessfully fought Ribble Valley at the election of 1987, placing third, before gaining Hyndburn from the Conservative Ken Hargreaves in April 1992. Considered a Blairite, Pope is a signatory of the Henry Jackson Society. He was a member of the backbench committee on Northern Ireland from 1997 to 2001.

In April 2000, as a whip, Pope inadvertently approved a Liberal Democrat clause in the government's utilities bill, committing the government to meet 10% of electricity requirements from green sources by 2010. Pope said: “We were doing a series of government amendments. I realised I'd shouted aye too many times. I'm not overjoyed about it.” The error led the government to instruct its MPs to vote against the clause.

In July 2003, Pope admitted leaking confidential Foreign Affairs Select Committee evidence to The Guardian chief political correspondent Patrick Wintour. The move was described as an attempt to “bounce” MPs on the committee into clearing Alastair Campbell of “sexing up” the so called Dodgy Dossier. This was of evidence into the threat, posed by Iraqi leader Saddam Hussein.

On 11 June 2009, Pope announced that he would stand down at the 2010 Election. In November 2009, Graham Jones, who later became his successor, was chosen as an candidate to succeed him by Labour. In April 2010, he revealed he nearly did not stand in 2005. However, quite a few of his friends and family talked to him and persuaded him to have one more term, which he did have.

== After politics ==
On 19 April 2010, Pope was appointed as the deputy director of the Catholic Education Service (CES). In March 2017, he left the CES to become the assistant general secretary of the Catholic Bishops' Conference of England & Wales; in October 2019 he became its executive director, and in November 2024 its general secretary.

== Personal life ==
He married Catherine Fallon on 2 August 1985; they have three children. Catherine, known as Kate, is the general secretary of the Association of Educational Psychologists, a registered trade union representing educational psychologists working in the United Kingdom. Their son, Conor, was previously deputy editor of pressure group by New Labour, Progress.

Parliament of the United Kingdom
Preceded by Ken Hargreaves	Member of Parliament for Hyndburn; 1992–2010	Succeeded by Graham Jones
