= Hyndburn (constituency) =

UK Parliament constituency (since 1983)

Coordinates: 53.768°N 2.382°W

- Borough constituency for the House of Commons
- Interactive map of boundaries since 1997
- Location within North West England
- County: Lancashire
- Electorate: 71,145 (March 2020)
- Major settlements: Accrington, Haslingden and Oswaldtwistle

Current constituency
- Created: 1983
- Member of Parliament: Sarah Smith (Labour)
- Seats: One
- Created from: Accrington and Clitheroe

Hyndburn is a constituency (Note: A borough constituency (for the purposes of election expenses and type of returning officer)) in Lancashire represented in the House of Commons of the UK Parliament since 2024 by Sarah Smith of the Labour Party. (Note: As with all constituencies, the constituency elects one Member of Parliament (MP) by the first past the post system of election at least every five years.)

== Constituency profile ==
The Hyndburn constituency is located in Lancashire and covers the local government district of the same name and parts of Rossendale district. Its largest town is Accrington, which has a population of around 37,000. The other towns in the constituency are Oswaldtwistle, Rishton, Clayton-le-Moors, Great Harwood and Haslingden. The towns of Hyndburn have an industrial heritage with a history of textile manufacturing, coal mining and brick manufacturing; the Accrington brick was used for the foundations of the Empire State Building. The constituency has low levels of wealth, with most of Accrington falling within the top 10% most-deprived areas of England. House prices in the constituency are very low, with the average price being less than half the national average.

In general, residents of Hyndburn have low levels of education and income. Few work in professional or scientific occupations, and a high proportion work in the retail and manufacturing sectors. White people made up 82% of the population at the 2021 census, a similar percentage to the country as a whole. Asians, mostly Pakistanis, formed the largest ethnic minority group at 15%. This community is concentrated in the west of Accrington, where they make up a majority of the population. At the local district council level, most of the constituency is represented by Labour Party and independent councillors, with some Conservatives elected in the rural southern parts. At the county council, which held elections more recently, most seats in Hyndburn were won by Reform UK. Voters in Hyndburn strongly supported leaving the European Union in the 2016 referendum; an estimated 65% voted in favour of Brexit compared to the nationwide figure of 52%.

== History ==
The seat was created in 1983, from parts of the former seats of Accrington and Clitheroe. In its ambit is much terraced (freehold) owner occupied housing and surrounding villages, that may have helped to win the constituency for a Conservative in 1983, by 21 votes. The Conservative majority in 1983 was the second smallest achieved by any party in a seat in the United Kingdom at that election, only being beaten by the Conservatives 7 vote majority in Leicester South In 1987, against the national trend, the Conservative vote share increased by 2.1% while Labour's vote share fell by 2.4%. Consequently, the Conservatives increased their majority to 2,220 votes, a higher majority than it achieved in 31 other seats.

Labour won it in 1992, and chose a new candidate for 2010, Graham Jones, who was elected. Part of Labour's Red Wall, the seat was won by the Conservatives in 2019, with the twenty-four year old Tory candidate Sara Britcliffe ousting Jones with a swing of 9.9%. This was reversed in 2024, when Sarah Smith won it back for Labour.

In January 1996, Hyndburn Conservatives deselected Hugh Neil, after a six-week investigation into alleged bogus claims that he made about his background. Neil claimed to have a doctorate from Manchester Business School and Harvard Business School, to have been an adviser to Keith Joseph, and to be a member of the Institute of Directors. He would have been the party's first black MP.

== Boundaries ==
=== Historic ===
1983–1997: The Borough of Hyndburn.

1997–2024: The Borough of Hyndburn, and the Borough of Rossendale wards of Greenfield and Worsley.

Following its review of parliamentary representation in Lancashire in the 2000s, the Boundary Commission made minor alterations to the existing Hyndburn constituency. Two Haslingden wards from Rossendale district had been added to the constituency in 1997. The Commission rejected a proposal to rename the constituency "Hyndburn and Haslingden", following the Assistant Commissioner's view that:

It is obviously right that constituency names should as far as possible reflect the geography and character of the constituency but equally they should be as succinct as reasonably possible

=== Current ===
The 2023 review of Westminster constituencies, which was based on the ward structure in place on 1 December 2020, left the boundaries unchanged. However, following a local government boundary review in Rossendale which came into effect in May 2024, the constituency now comprises the following from the 2024 general election:

- The Borough of Hyndburn.
- The Borough of Rossendale wards or part wards of: Greenfield & Eden (small part); Haslingden; Helmshore (very small part).

== Members of Parliament ==
Election	Member	Party
1983	Ken Hargreaves	Conservative
1992	Greg Pope	Labour
2010	Graham Jones	Labour
2019	Sara Britcliffe	Conservative
2024	Sarah Smith	Labour

== Elections ==
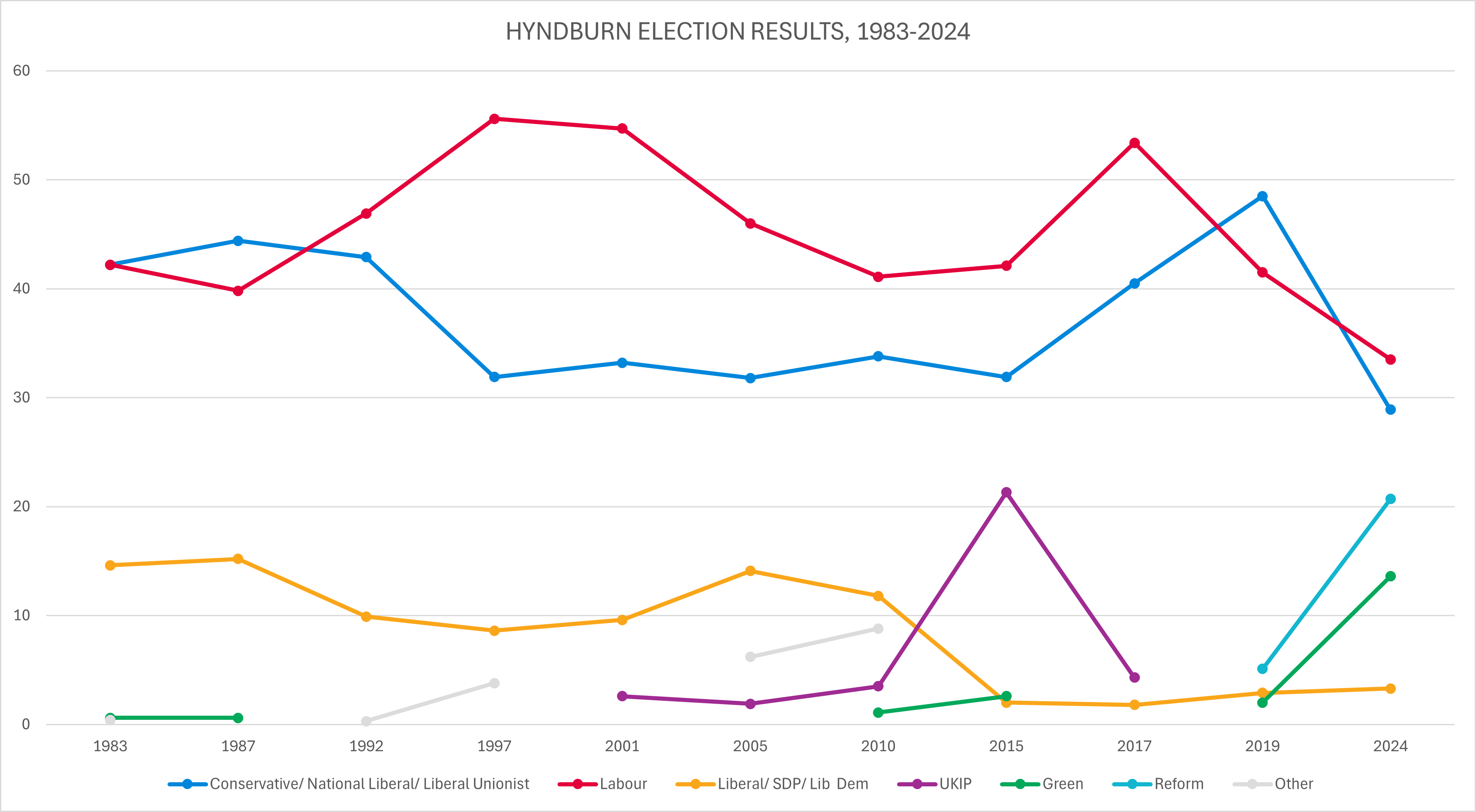
Election results 1983-2024

=== Elections in the 2020s ===
General election 2024: Hyndburn
Party	Candidate	Votes	%	±%
Labour	Sarah Smith	12,186	33.5	−8.0
Conservative	Sara Britcliffe	10,499	28.9	−19.6
Reform	Richard Oakley	7,541	20.7	+15.6
Green	Shabir Fazal	4,938	13.6	+11.6
Liberal Democrats	Beth Waller-Slack	1,210	3.3	+0.4
Majority		1,687	4.6	N/A
Turnout		36,374	54.2	−5.4
Registered electors		67,147		
Labour gain from Conservative		Swing	+5.8	

=== Elections in the 2010s ===
General election 2019: Hyndburn
Party	Candidate	Votes	%	±%
Conservative	Sara Britcliffe	20,565	48.5	+8.0
Labour	Graham Jones	17,614	41.5	―11.9
Brexit Party	Gregory Butt	2,156	5.1	New
Liberal Democrats	Adam Waller-Slack	1,226	2.9	+1.1
Green	Katrina Brockbank	845	2.0	New
Majority		2,951	7.0	N/A
Turnout		42,406	59.8	―2.0
Conservative gain from Labour		Swing	+9.9	

General election 2017: Hyndburn
Party	Candidate	Votes	%	±%
Labour	Graham Jones	24,120	53.4	+11.3
Conservative	Kevin Horkin	18,305	40.5	+8.6
UKIP	Janet Brown	1,953	4.3	―17.0
Liberal Democrats	Leslie Jones	824	1.8	―0.2
Majority		5,815	12.9	+2.7
Turnout		45,307	61.8	―1.0
Labour hold		Swing	+1.3	

General election 2015: Hyndburn
Party	Candidate	Votes	%	±%
Labour	Graham Jones	18,076	42.1	+1.0
Conservative	Kevin Horkin	13,676	31.9	―1.9
UKIP	Janet Brown	9,154	21.3	+17.8
Green	Kerry Gormley	1,122	2.6	+1.5
Liberal Democrats	Alison Firth	859	2.0	―9.8
Majority		4,400	10.2	+3.0
Turnout		42,887	62.8	―0.7
Labour hold		Swing		

General election 2010: Hyndburn
Party	Candidate	Votes	%	±%
Labour	Graham Jones	17,531	41.1	―4.6
Conservative	Karen Buckley	14,441	33.8	+1.9
Liberal Democrats	Andrew Rankine	5,033	11.8	―2.6
BNP	Andrew Eccles	2,137	5.0	―1.2
UKIP	Granville Barker	1,481	3.5	+1.6
CPA	Kevin Logan	795	1.9	New
Green	Kerry Gormley	463	1.1	New
English Democrat	Chris Reid	413	1.0	New
Independent	Craig Hall	378	0.9	New
Majority		3,090	7.2	―7.0
Turnout		42,672	63.5	+4.7
Labour hold		Swing	―3.3	

=== Elections in the 2000s ===
General election 2005: Hyndburn
Party	Candidate	Votes	%	±%
Labour	Greg Pope	18,136	46.0	―8.7
Conservative	James Mawdsley	12,549	31.8	―1.4
Liberal Democrats	Bill Greene	5,577	14.1	+4.5
BNP	Christian Jackson	2,444	6.2	New
UKIP	John Whittaker	743	1.9	―0.7
Majority		5,587	14.2	―7.3
Turnout		39,449	58.8	+1.3
Labour hold		Swing	―3.7	

General election 2001: Hyndburn
Party	Candidate	Votes	%	±%
Labour	Greg Pope	20,900	54.7	―0.9
Conservative	Peter Britcliffe	12,681	33.2	+1.3
Liberal Democrats	Bill Greene	3,680	9.6	+1.0
UKIP	John Tomlin	982	2.6	New
Majority		8,219	21.5	―2.2
Turnout		38,243	57.5	―14.8
Labour hold		Swing		

=== Elections in the 1990s ===
General election 1997: Hyndburn
Party	Candidate	Votes	%	±%
Labour	Greg Pope	26,831	55.6	+8.7
Conservative	Peter Britcliffe	15,383	31.9	―11.0
Liberal Democrats	Les Jones	4,141	8.6	―1.3
Referendum	Philip Congdon	1,627	3.4	New
Independent Anti-Corruption in Government (IAC)	James Brown	290	0.4	New
Majority		11,548	23.7	+19.7
Turnout		48,272	72.3	―11.6
Labour hold		Swing	+9.9	

General election 1992: Hyndburn
Party	Candidate	Votes	%	±%
Labour	Greg Pope	23,042	46.9	+7.1
Conservative	Ken Hargreaves	21,082	42.9	―1.5
Liberal Democrats	Yvonne Stars	4,886	9.9	―5.3
Natural Law	Stephen Whittle	150	0.3	New
Majority		1,960	4.0	N/A
Turnout		49,160	83.9	+3.4
Labour gain from Conservative		Swing	+4.3	

=== Elections in the 1980s ===
General election 1987: Hyndburn
Party	Candidate	Votes	%	±%
Conservative	Ken Hargreaves	21,606	44.4	+2.2
Labour	Keva Christopher Coombes	19,386	39.8	―2.4
SDP	John Stark	7,423	15.2	+0.6
Green	Frank Smith	297	0.6	0.0
Majority		2,220	4.6	+4.6
Turnout		48,712	80.5	+3.1
Conservative hold		Swing	+2.3	

General election 1983: Hyndburn
Party	Candidate	Votes	%	±%
Conservative	Ken Hargreaves	19,405	42.2	
Labour	Arthur Davidson	19,384	42.2	
SDP	John Bridgen	6,716	14.6	
Ecology	Frank Smith	266	0.6	
Independent	Paul Gateson	169	0.4	
Majority		21	0.0	
Turnout		45,940	77.4	
Conservative win (new seat)				

== See also ==
- List of parliamentary constituencies in Lancashire
