= Ken Hargreaves =

British politician

Ken Hargreaves MBE

Member of Parliament for Hyndburn
- In office 9 June 1983 – 16 March 1992
- Preceded by: Constituency created
- Succeeded by: Greg Pope

Personal details
- Born: 1 March 1939 Ware, England
- Died: 23 June 2012 (aged 73) Blackburn, England
- Party: Conservative
- Occupation: Mayor of Hyndburn (1979/80); Member of Parliament (1983–92)

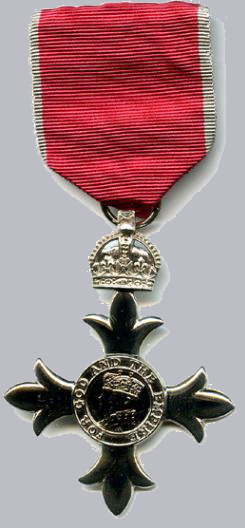
MBE insignia

Joseph Kenneth Hargreaves, MBE, FCIS (1 March 1939 – 23 June 2012), served as the Conservative Member of Parliament for Hyndburn in Lancashire between 1983 and 1992.

A chartered secretary and company administrator by profession, Hargreaves served as a local councillor becoming Mayor of Hyndburn for 1979/80.

In 1990, Hargreaves, with Liberal Democrat MP David Alton (now Lord Alton of Liverpool) and Labour MP Derek Enright, founded the Movement for Christian Democracy (now the Christian Peoples Alliance) serving as Vice-Chairman with the support of Monsignor Thomas Adamson.

After losing his seat at the 1992 general election to Labour's Greg Pope, Hargreaves worked at Conservative Central Office as liaison with local Conservative Clubs. At the 2005 general election, he campaigned unsuccessfully in Hyndburn for Conservative candidate James Mawdsley.

A devout Roman Catholic, he was a parishioner of St Mary's RC Church, Oswaldtwistle, in his former constituency. Hargreaves died on 23 June 2012 at the East Lancashire Hospice at Blackburn.

== Honours and awards ==
Appointed MBE for "services to the community in Lancashire" in the New Year Honours on 29 December 2006, Hargreaves received a Papal knighthood in 2012 becoming a Knight of the Order of St Gregory the Great.

=== Fellowships and affiliations ===
- Fellow, Institute of Chartered Secretaries and Administrators
- Pro-life lobby group: Right to Life
- President: Accrington and District Blind Society
- President: Hyndburn Arthritis Care
- Chairman of the Trustees: Maundy Relief
- Chairman: Disabled Association for Sport in Hyndburn

Parliament of the United Kingdom
New constituency	Member of Parliament for Hyndburn; 1983–1992	Succeeded by Greg Pope
