= Sarah Smith (politician) =

British politician

Sarah Smith MP
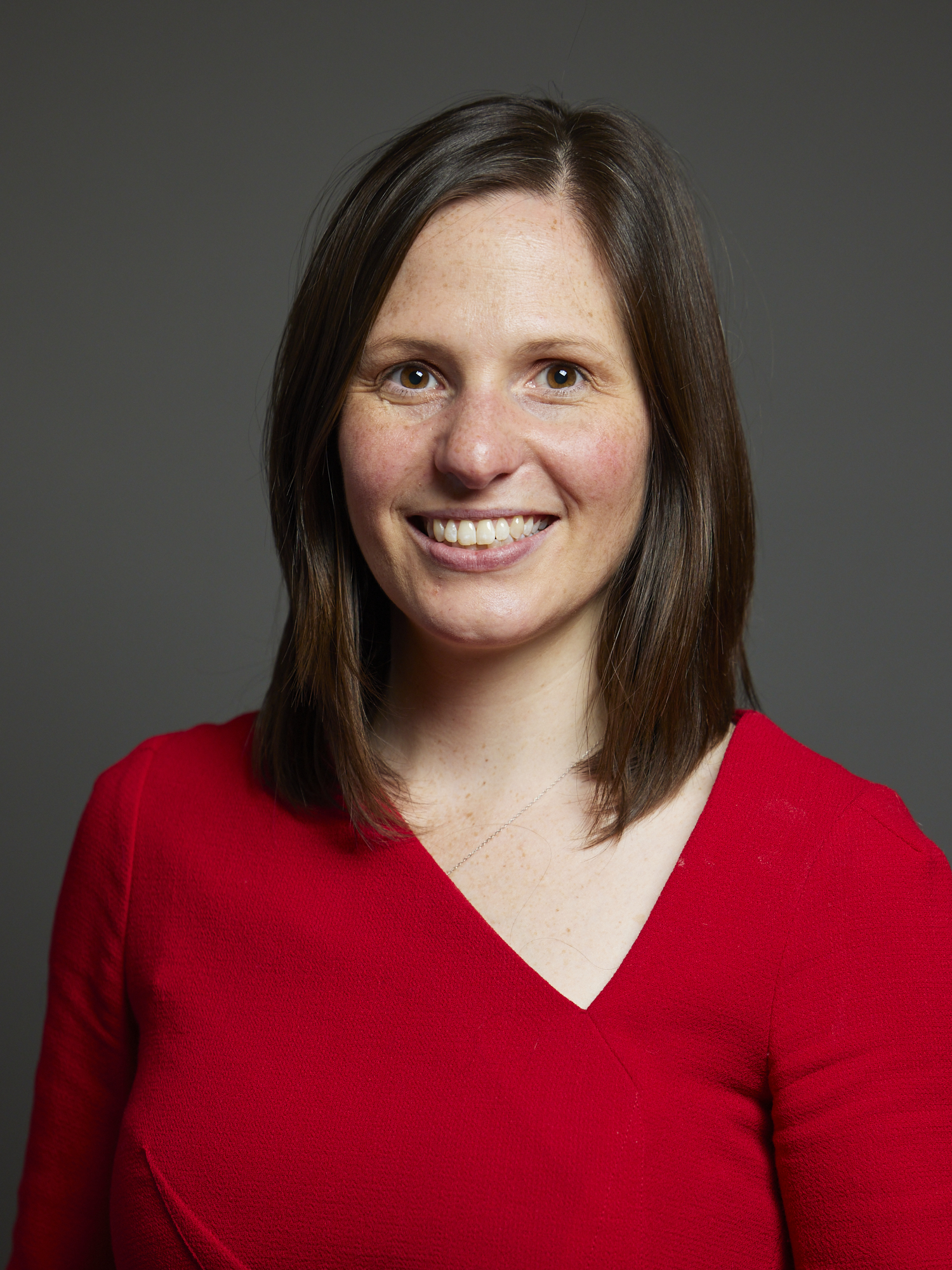
- Official portrait, 2024

Member of Parliament for Hyndburn
- Incumbent
- Assumed office 4 July 2024
- Preceded by: Sara Britcliffe
- Majority: 1,687 (4.6%)

Personal details
- Born: Sarah Madeleine Webster Smith c.1986
- Party: Labour
- Children: 1
- Education: Inverurie Academy
- Alma mater: Queen Mary University of London

Sarah Madeleine Webster Smith is a British Labour Party politician serving as the Member of Parliament for Hyndburn since 2024.

== Early life and career ==
Smith attended school at Chapel of Garioch Primary School and Inverurie Academy in north-east Scotland and went on to study law at Queen Mary University of London. She subsequently worked mostly at a number of non-profit organisations.

== Political career ==
Smith was elected as the Labour councillor for the Marton ward at the 2023 Blackpool Council election. Following her election as an MP, she resigned as a councillor in August 2024. On 4 October 2024, the local by-election for her council seat was won by Reform UK candidate Jim O'Neill.

Smith was elected as MP for the Hyndburn constituency in Lancashire at the general election in July 2024 with a majority of 1,687 over the incumbent Conservative MP.

On 11 May 2026, she called on prime minister Keir Starmer to resign following the local elections.

== Personal life ==
Smith is married and has one child.

Parliament of the United Kingdom
Preceded by Sara Britcliffe	Member of Parliament for Hyndburn; 2024–present	Incumbent
