= 2022 Hyndburn Borough Council election =

Hyndburn Borough Council election

- 5 May 2022

11 of 35 seats to Hyndburn Borough Council 18 seats needed for a majority
	First party	Second party
Leader	Paul Cox (Interim)	Marlene Haworth
Party	Labour	Conservative
Leader's seat	Milnshaw	St Oswald's
Seats before	19	12
Seats won	17	14
Seat change	▼2	▲2
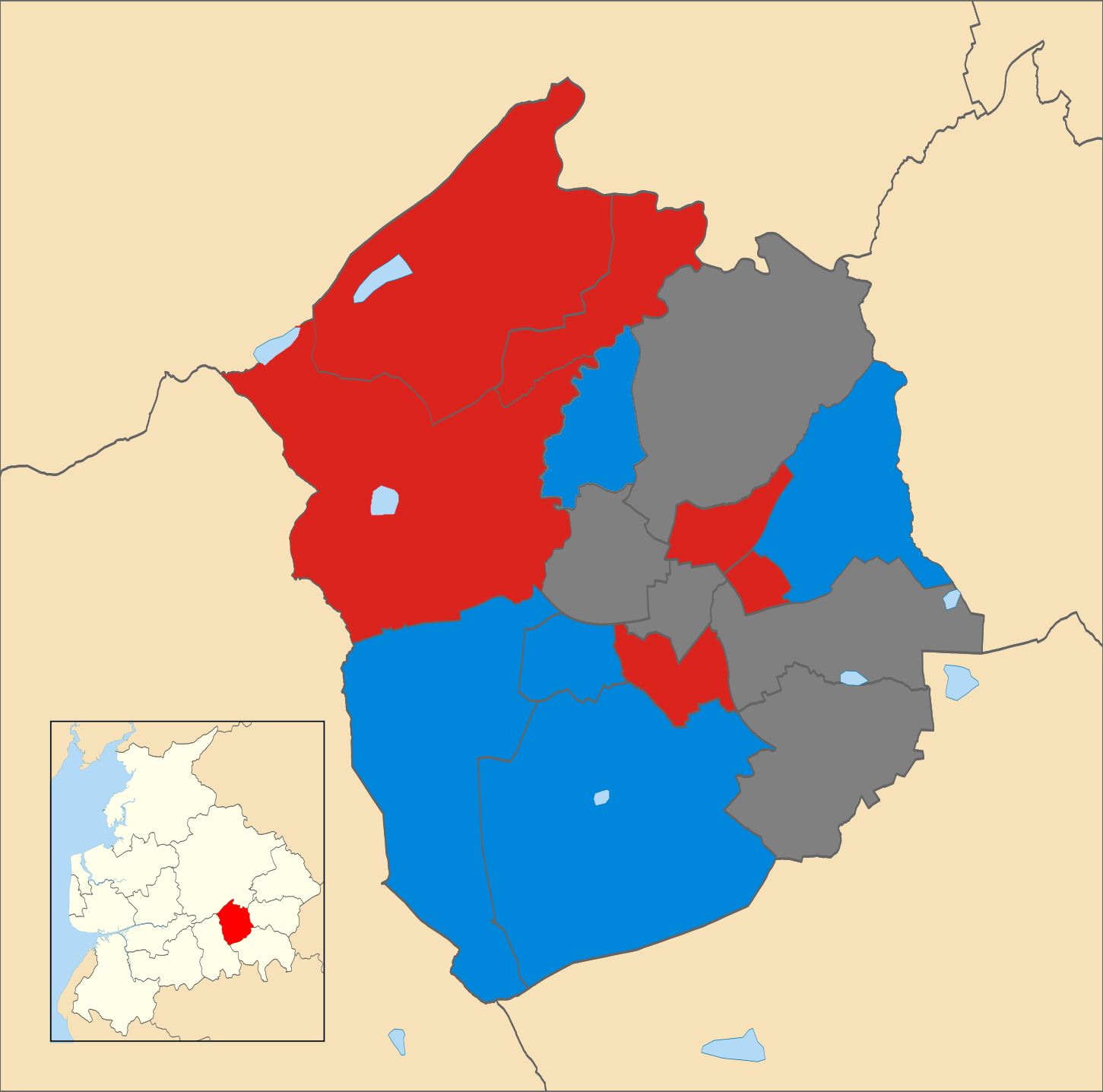
- 2022 local election results in Hyndburn Labour Conservative Not contested

A by-thirds Hyndburn Borough Council local election, was held on Thursday 5 May 2022. Approximately one third of the local council's 35 seats fell up for election on that day.

== Background ==
Before the election Labour had a majority of 15 councillors, Conservatives had 12 councillors, with 6 Independent councillors and 2-vacant (following Chris Knight's (Lab-St. Oswalds) March-23rd announcement that he has stood down as a councillor with immediate effect, despite not being up for re-election until May next year, in addition to the announcement (March-24th) that Leader of Hyndburn Council, Miles Parkinson, resigned from the Labour Party and will now be an independent councillor for Altham ward, until May-2023 and after Labour Councillor Eamonn Higgins announced (March-31st) that he would be quitting Labour, to serve Huncoat as an independent for the remainder of his term, until May-2023.

In this election, Labour were defending 6-ward-seats with Conservatives defending 4-ward-seats. In 2018, Overton was won by Labour's Jennifer MOLINEUX, who later left the Party to become an independent councillor, but she was standing down in this election. In 2019, St Oswald's was won by Labour's Chris KNIGHT, who recently stood down as a councillor leaving his vacant-seat open to a by-election. Former Labour candidate Shahed MAHMOOD also quit Labour last year and was standing for the Conservatives in Milnshaw ward.

== Local election result ==
After the election, the composition of the council's 35 seats was -

- Labour 17
- Conservative 15
- Independent 3

Party	Leader	Councillors			Votes	
Party	Leader		Of total	Whole Council		Of total
Labour		6	50.0%	17 / 35	6,427	45.86%
Conservative Party		6	50.0%	15 / 35	5,997	42.79%
Independents		0	0.0%	3 / 35	945	6.74%
Reform UK		0	0.0%	0 / 35	512	3.65%

NB: Five (of the 16) Council wards, where seats were NOT up for re-election in 2022, included the following wards - Altham, Baxenden and Church, plus Barnfield and Central in Accrington

Previous Councillors who were Standing-Down in this election included - Bernadette Parkinson (Ind-Netherton), David Parkins (Lab-Huncoat), Diane Fielding (Lab-Spring Hill) and Jenny Molineux (Ind-Overton).

Additionally, following Chris Knight's (Lab-St. Oswalds) recent and sudden decision to stand-down from the seat he won in 2019, that seat will ALSO be up for a by-election this year - with the winner serving out the remaining 12-months, until THAT same seat comes up for re-election to a full-4-year term from 2023.

Retiring Netherton councillor Bernadette Parkinson announced[April-11th] that she has resigned from the Labour Party after 27 years, in the wake of her husband and council leader Cllr Miles Parkinson, who also quit the party. Another retiring councillor, Spring Hill's Diane Fielding announced[April-19th] that she has also resigned from the Labour Party. Former Overton Labour councillor Michael Hindley announced[April-20th] that he has resigned from the Labour Party, leaving that seat vacant, after being recently cautioned by the police over an assault during a previous council meeting. This leaves the Hyndburn Labour Party with only 15-sitting councillors (less than the 18 needed for Overall Control), ahead of the upcoming May-election.

In the months following this election, veteran Labour politician Joyce Plummer, who took a post in Hyndburn Borough Council's new cabinet, was suspended from the party group[June-29th] and faces further disciplinary action by the party which could lead to her expulsion, ahead of the Overton by-election, called for Thursday July 14. And also, some months later, former Church Labour councillor Loraine Cox announced[August-24th] that she has resigned from the Labour Party, to join the growing Independent group of councillors, before eventually joining the Hyndburn Conservative group[September-5th]. This leaves the Hyndburn Labour Party with only 13-sitting councillors, compared to 2019 when they had 26 councillors on Hyndburn Borough Council.

== Ward results ==
The results for each ward were as follows, with an asterisk (*) indicating a sitting councillor standing for re-election.

=== Clayton-le-Moors ===
Clayton-le-Moors - electorate 3,449
Party	Candidate	Votes	%	±%
Conservative	Peter EDWARDS	594	53.7	20.2
Labour	Timothy Aidan O'KANE*	512	46.3	3.4
...	spoilt votes	14		
Majority		82	7.4	N/A
Turnout		1,121	32.50	1.58
Conservative gain from Labour		Swing	N/A	

=== Huncoat ===
Huncoat - electorate 3,548
Party	Candidate	Votes	%	±%
Conservative	Danny CASSIDY	641	59.2	47.7
Labour	Samina MAHMOOD	442	40.8	−24.3
...	spoilt votes	22		
Majority		199	18.4	N/A
Turnout		1,106	31.17	−6.32
Conservative gain from Labour		Swing	N/A	

=== Immanuel ===
Immanuel - electorate 3,372
Party	Candidate	Votes	%	±%
Conservative	Josh Blayne ALLEN*	609	55.2	−8.5
Labour	Joanne Louise DEXTER	495	44.8	8.5
...	spoilt votes	23		
Majority		114	10.4	N/A
Turnout		1,124	33.33	−0.98
Conservative hold		Swing		

=== Milnshaw ===
Milnshaw - electorate 3,512
Party	Candidate	Votes	%	±%
Labour	Andrew Steven CLEGG*	538	48.7	−3.7
Conservative	Shahed MAHMOOD	353	31.9	14.0
Independent	Malcolm Eric PRITCHARD	214	19.4	−10.3
...	spoilt votes	11		
Majority		185	16.5	N/A
Turnout		1,118	31.83	−8.27
Labour hold		Swing	N/A	

=== Netherton ===
Netherton - electorate 3,391
Party	Candidate	Votes	%	±%
Labour	Jodi CLEMENTS	717	64.0	−0.7
Conservative	Mohammed AFZAL	315	28.1	−7.2
Reform	Ian ROBINSON	88	7.9	N/A
...	spoilt votes	9		
Majority		402	35.9	N/A
Turnout		1,124	33.15	−4.3
Labour hold		Swing		

=== Overton ===
Overton - electorate 4,723
Party	Candidate	Votes	%	±%
Labour	Scott John BRERTON	803	52.1	5.4
Conservative	Gareth Jason MOLINEUX	559	36.3	−9.3
Reform	Wayne FITZHARRIS	178	11.6	N/A
...	spoilt votes	8		
Majority		244	15.8	N/A
Turnout		1,560	33.03	−3.38
Labour hold		Swing		

=== Peel ===
Peel - electorate 3,006
Party	Candidate	Votes	%	±%
Labour	Joyce Nicholson PLUMMER*	507	68.9	−0.5
Conservative	Jean HURN	184	25.0	10.8
Reform	Sarah-Kay FITZHARRIS	45	6.1	N/A
...	spoilt votes	9		
Majority		323	43.9	N/A
Turnout		747	24.85	−2.5
Labour hold		Swing		

=== Rishton ===
Rishton - electorate 4,941
Party	Candidate	Votes	%	±%
Labour	Bernard DAWSON	542	34.5	−13.0
Conservative	Michael MILLER*	504	32.0	−20.5
Independent	Andrew Joseph HARRIS	446	28.4	N/A
Reform	Paul David HACKER	81	5.1	N/A
...	spoilt votes	9		
Majority		38	2.5	N/A
Turnout		1,582	32.02	3.79
Labour gain from Conservative		Swing	N/A	

=== Spring Hill ===
Spring Hill - electorate 3,592
Party	Candidate	Votes	%	±%
Labour	Kimberley WHITEHEAD	725	52.6	−30.6
Conservative	Allah DAD	654	47.4	30.6
...	spoilt votes	15		
Majority		71	5.2	N/A
Turnout		1,394	38.81	12.66
Labour hold		Swing		

=== St Andrew's ===
St. Andrew's - electorate 3,355
Party	Candidate	Votes	%	±%
Conservative	Steven Lee SMITHSON	578	53.4	2.1
Labour	Stewart Thurston EAVES	505	46.6	−2.1
...	spoilt votes	9		
Majority		73	6.8	N/A
Turnout		1,094	32.61	−5.07
Conservative hold		Swing		

=== St Oswald's ===
St Oswald's - electorate 4,836
Party	Candidate	Votes	%	±%
Conservative	Marlene Heather HAWORTH*	1,006	56.3	10.3
Conservative	Zak KHAN (*)	734	41.1	−2.9
Labour	Glen Kevin HARRISON	641	35.9	−9.2
Labour	Wajid HUSSAIN	375	21.0	−24.1
Independent	Janet BROWN	285	15.9	N/A
Reform	Paul BROWN	120	6.7	−1.9
Reform	Richard OAKLEY	35	2.0	−6.6
...	spoilt votes	4		
Majority		N/A		
Turnout		1,792	37.06	
Conservative hold		Swing	N/A	
Conservative gain from Labour		Swing	N/A	
