= Hyndburn =

Coordinates: 53.768°N 2.382°W

Borough of Hyndburn
- Borough and non-metropolitan district
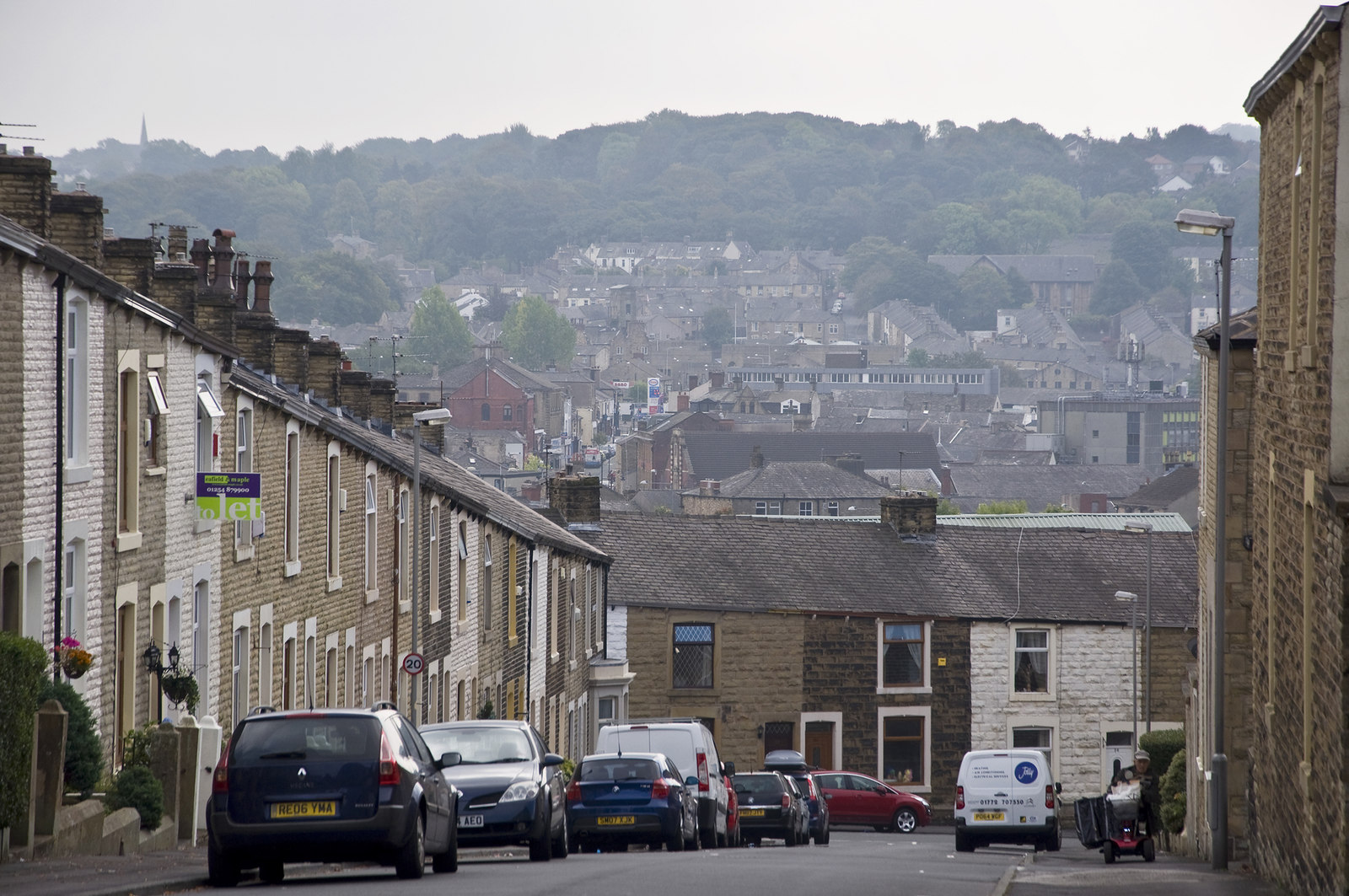
- Accrington, the largest town and administrative centre of Hyndburn

- Coat of Arms

- Shown within Lancashire and England
- Sovereign state: United Kingdom
- Constituent country: England
- Region: North West England
- Ceremonial county: Lancashire
- Founded: 1974
- Admin. HQ: Accrington

Government
  - Type: Hyndburn Borough Council
  - MPs: Sarah Smith

Area
  - Total: 28 sq mi (73 km^{2})
  - Rank: 226th

Population (2025)
  - Total: 86,908
  - Rank: Ranked 274th
  - Density: 3,100/sq mi (1,200/km^{2})

Ethnicity (2021)
  - Ethnic groups: List: 82.7% White; 15.1% Asian; 1.3% Mixed; 0.7% other; 0.3% Black

Religion (2021)
  - Religion: List: 51% Christianity; 28.4% no religion; 14.7% Islam; 5.2% not stated; 0.4% other; 0.2% Buddhism; 0.1% Hinduism; 0.1% Sikhism; 0.1% Judaism
- Time zone: UTC+0 (Greenwich Mean Time)
  - Summer (DST): UTC+1 (British Summer Time)
- Postcode: BB1, BB5, BB6
- Area code: 01254
- ONS code: 30UG (ONS); E07000120 (GSS)

Hyndburn /ˈhaɪndbərn/ is a local government district with borough status in Lancashire, England. Its council is based in Accrington, the largest town, and the borough also covers the outlying towns of Clayton-le-Moors, Great Harwood, Oswaldtwistle and Rishton. The borough was created in 1974 and takes its name from the River Hyndburn. It had a population of 80,734 at the 2011 census. Elections to the council are held in three out of every four years, with one third of the 35 seats on the council being elected at each election. Both the Conservative and Labour parties have controlled the council at different times, as well as periods when no party has had a majority.

Hyndburn borders the boroughs of Ribble Valley to the north, Burnley to the east, Rossendale to the south, and Blackburn with Darwen to the west.

== History ==
The district was created on 1 April 1974 under the Local Government Act 1972, as a non-metropolitan district covering the territory of six former districts, which were abolished at the same time, plus a single parish from a seventh district:

- Accrington Municipal Borough
- Altham parish from Burnley Rural District
- Church Urban District
- Clayton-le-Moors Urban District
- Great Harwood Urban District
- Oswaldtwistle Urban District
- Rishton Urban District

The new district was given the name Hyndburn, taken from the River Hyndburn which passes through the district. The new district was awarded borough status on the day that it came into being, allowing the chairman of the council to take the title of mayor.

In 2007, the council proposed changing the name from Hyndburn to Accrington and Districts, to aid recognition of the borough by those not familiar with the area. After a public consultation, the change of name did not go ahead.

Under current local government reorganisation plans, all district councils in Lancashire, as well as the county council, will be abolished in 2028, with the district becoming part of a new Pennine Lancashire unitary authority.

== Governance ==
Hyndburn Borough Council

Type
- Type: Non-metropolitan district

History
- Founded: 1 April 1974

Leadership
- Mayor: Noordad Aziz, Labour since 28 May 2026
- Leader: Munsif Dad, Labour since 23 May 2024
- Chief Executive: David Welsby

Structure
- Seats: 35 councillors
- Graph of the party split among 35 seats.
- Political groups: Administration (17) Labour (17) Other parties (18) Conservative (8) Reform (8) Green (1) Independent (1)

Elections
- Voting system: First past the post
- Last election: 7 May 2026
- Next election: 6 May 2027

Meeting place
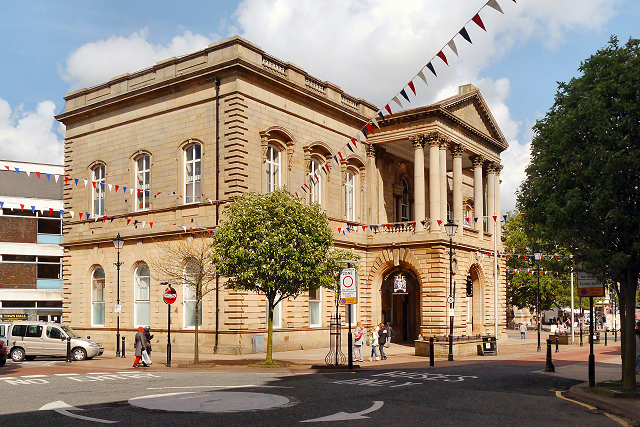
- Town Hall, Blackburn Road, Accrington, BB5 1LA

Website
- www.hyndburnbc.gov.uk

Hyndburn Borough Council provides district-level services. County-level services are provided by Lancashire County Council. Altham is a civil parish, which forms a third tier of local government for that part of the borough.

In March 2010, Hyndburn Borough Council was voted the 10th best council in The Times "Best Public Sector Places to Work". The borough also made it to The Times Best Companies Guide.

=== Political control ===
The council has been under no overall control since the 2026 election. Labour is the largest party, and runs the council as a minority administration.

The first election to the council was held in 1973, initially operating as a shadow authority alongside the outgoing authorities before coming into its powers on 1 April 1974. Political control of the council since 1974 has been as follows:

Party in control	Years
No overall control	1974–1976
Conservative	1976–1980
Labour	1980–1984
Conservative	1984–1986
Labour	1986–1999
No overall control	1999–2000
Conservative	2000–2002
Labour	2002–2003
Conservative	2003–2010
No overall control	2010–2011
Labour	2011–2022
No overall control	2022–2024
Labour	2024–2026
No overall control	2026-present

=== Leadership ===
The role of Mayor of Hyndburn is largely ceremonial, with political leadership instead provided by the leader of the council. The leaders since 1981 have been:

Councillor	Party	From	To
Michael Hindley	Labour	Oct 1981	1984
Nigel Bramley-Haworth	Conservative	1984	May 1986
Ed Saville	Labour	May 1986	Jan 1988
George Slynn	Labour	Jan 1988	May 1999
Peter Britcliffe	Conservative	May 1999	May 2002
Ian Ormerod	Labour	May 2002	May 2003
Peter Britcliffe	Conservative	2003	May 2011
Miles Parkinson	Labour	May 2011	24 Mar 2022
Miles Parkinson	Independent	24 Mar 2022	May 2023
Marlene Haworth	Conservative	18 May 2023	23 May 2024
Munsif Dad	Labour	23 May 2024	

=== Composition ===
Following the 2026 election, the composition of the council was:

Party	Seats
Labour	17
Conservative	8
Reform	8
Green	1
Independent	1
Total	35

The next election is scheduled to take place in 2027.

=== Elections ===
Since the last boundary changes in 2002 the council has comprised 35 councillors representing 16 wards, with each ward electing two or three councillors. Elections are held three years out of every four, with roughly a third of the council elected each time for a four-year term of office. Lancashire County Council elections are held in the fourth year of the cycle when there are no borough council elections.

=== Premises ===
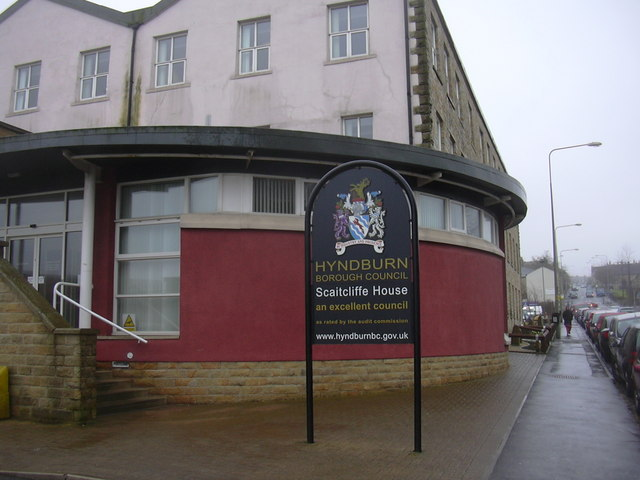
Scaitcliffe House, Accrington

The council's main offices are at Scaitcliffe House on Ormerod Street in Accrington, being part of a converted textile mill. The council moved there in 2002. Full council meetings are usually held at Accrington Town Hall.

== Education ==
There are approximately nine state secondary schools in Hyndburn. These include The Hyndburn Academy, St Christopher's Church of England High School, Accrington Academy, Rhyddings, Mount Carmel Roman Catholic High School, The Hollins, along with Broadfield Specialist School, and North Cliffe School.

The percentage of pupils achieving 5 or more GCSEs at grades A*-C has increased from 43.7% in 2001 to 75.9% in 2011. Absences dropped from 12,052 in 2006 to 9,545 in 2011, mainly due to schools competing.

== Geography ==
The district is polycentric and is located between the larger settlements of Blackburn and Burnley. It is linked to both areas by the M65 motorway and the East Lancashire railway line.

The borough had a population of 80,734 at the 2011 census. Much of the borough forms part of the Accrington/Rossendale Built-up area as defined by the Office for National Statistics, which covers the borough and parts of the neighbouring borough of Rossendale. The Accrington/Rossendale built-up area extends from the town of Accrington to Rawtenstall and Bacup, taking in parts of the boroughs of Hyndburn and Rossendale. The Accrington/Rossendale built-up area was recorded at having a population of 125,059 at the 2011 census.

== Places in Hyndburn ==
Towns, suburbs and villages in the Borough of Hyndburn
- Accrington
- Altham
- Baxenden
- Belthorn (part)
- Church
- Clayton-le-Moors
- Great Harwood
- Huncoat
- Knuzden (considered a suburb of Blackburn)
- Oswaldtwistle
- Rishton
- Tottleworth
- Whitebirk (part) (considered a suburb of Blackburn)

=== Civil parishes ===
Altham is the only civil parish in Hyndburn. The rest of the borough is an unparished area.

=== Media ===
The principal local radio station is Central Radio North West broadcasting on DAB across Blackburn, Burnley and most of Lancashire, providing local news, talk, and music. The former local radio station The Bee ceased broadcasting in July 2018. Hyndburn also falls in the coverage area of BBC Radio Lancashire, Hits Radio Lancashire, Greatest Hits Radio Lancashire, Smooth North West and Heart North West.

== Mayors ==
The role of mayor is usually held by a different councillor each year. They chair meetings of the full council and are expected to be politically impartial during their term of office, but they do get an additional casting vote in the event of a tie. The mayors since 1974 have been:

- 1974–1975: Wallace Haines
- 1975–1976: Donald John McNeil
- 1976–1977: Allan Critchlow
- 1977–1978: Jessie Marie Hall
- 1978–1979: Doris Grant
- 1979–1980: Joseph Kenneth Hargreaves
- 1980–1981: Christopher Dillon
- 1981–1982: Jennie Jackson
- 1982–1983: Phyllis Hargreaves
- 1983–1984: Thomas Wilfred Renshaw
- 1984–1985: Jack Grime
- 1985–1986: Edward Francis Hill
- 1986–1987: Leonard Dickinson
- 1987–1988: William Parkinson
- 1988–1989: Clifford Westell
- 1989–1990: Alan Dunwoodie Lund
- 1990–1991: William Birch Sumner
- 1991–1992: John Culshaw
- 1992–1993: Mary Catherine Thom
- 1993–1994: Sonia Mary Bramley-Howarth
- 1994–1995: Reginald George Goggin
- 1995–1996: Jean Battle
- 1996–1997: Mirza Mohammed Yousaf
- 1997–1998: Maurice Samuel Cowell
- 1998–1999: Ian James Ormerod
- 1999–2000: Bernard Dawson
- 2000–2001: Douglas Hayes
- 2001–2002: David Parkins
- 2002–2003: Sandra Katherine Hayes
- 2003–2004: Winifred Margaret Frankland
- 2004–2005: Miles Parkinson
- 2005–2006: Janet Storey
- 2006–2007: Mohammed Rahman
- 2007–2008: Anthony Dobson
- 2008–2009: Pamela Barton
- 2009–2010: Paul Barton
- 2010–2011: Malcolm Pritchard
- 2011–2012: Colette McCormack
- 2012–2013: John Broadley
- 2013–2014: Judith Addison
- 2014–2015: Munsif Dad
- 2015–2016: Marlene Howarth
- 2016–2017: Tim O'Kane
- 2017–2018: Peter Britcliffe
- 2018–2019: Mohammad Ayub
- 2019–2021: June Harrisson
- 2021–2022: Kathleen Pratt
- 2022–2023: Abdul Khan
- 2023–2024: Terry Hurn
- 2024–2025: Mike Booth
- 2025–2026: Josh Allen
- 2026–2027: Noordad Aziz

== Freedom of the Borough ==
The following people and military units have received the Freedom of the Borough of Hyndburn.

=== Individuals ===
- Ronald Hill: 10 July 2012
- Julie Hesmondhalgh: 28 January 2015
- David Lloyd: 6 July 2018
- Bernard Dawson: 6 July 2018

=== Military Units ===
- The Queen's Lancashire Regiment: 29 June 2002.
