= Hyndburn Borough Council elections =

Class of election in the United Kingdom

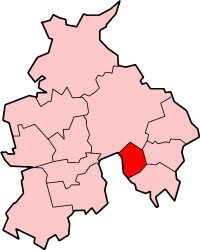
Hyndburn shown within the non-metropolitan county of Lancashire (Unitary authorities excluded)

Hyndburn Borough Council elections are generally held three years out of every four, with a third of the council elected each time. Hyndburn Borough Council is the local authority for the non-metropolitan district of Hyndburn in Lancashire, England. Since the last boundary changes in 2002, 35 councillors have been elected from 16 wards.

== Council elections ==
Elections are usually by thirds, in three of every four years.

Year/Party	Labour	LibDems	Cons	Indep	UKIP	Other	Controlling party	Notes
1973	24	3	21				NOC	
1976	14	1	33				Conservatives	
1979	19		28				Conservatives	New ward boundaries. Councillors reduced from 48 to 47 and all out election.
1980	27		20				Labour	
1982	26	1	20				Labour	
1983	25	2	20				Labour	
1984	20	3	24				Conservatives	
1986	25	6	16				Labour	
1987	26	7	14				Labour	Borough boundary changes took place but the number of seats remained the same.
1988	25	6	16				Labour	
1990	29	4	13			1	Labour	
1991	34	3	9			1	Labour	
1992	32	3	12				Labour	
1994	33	1	13				Labour	
1995	36	1	10				Labour	
1996	44		3				Labour	
1998	35		12				Labour	
1999	23		23	1			NOC	
2000	16		31				Conservative	
2002	18		17				Labour	New ward boundaries. Councillors reduced from 47 to 35 and all out election.
2003	17		18				Conservative	
2004	15		20				Conservative	
2006	16		18	1			Conservative	
2007	15		18	2			Conservative	
2008	13		18	4			Conservative	
2010	14		17	4			NOC	
2011	18		14	3			Labour	
2012	23		9	3			Labour	
2014	23		8	2	2		Labour	
2015	24		8	0	2		Labour	
2016	26		7		2		Labour	
2018	26		9	0			Labour	
2019	26		9				Labour	
2021	22		12	1			Labour	
2022	14		14	6			NOC	
2023	16		16	1		2	NOC	
2024	22		11	1		1	Labour	
2026	17		8	1		9	NOC	

== Borough result maps ==
2002 results map

2003 results map

2004 results map

2006 results map

2007 results map

2008 results map

2010 results map

2011 results map

2012 results map

2014 results map

2015 results map

2016 results map

2018 results map

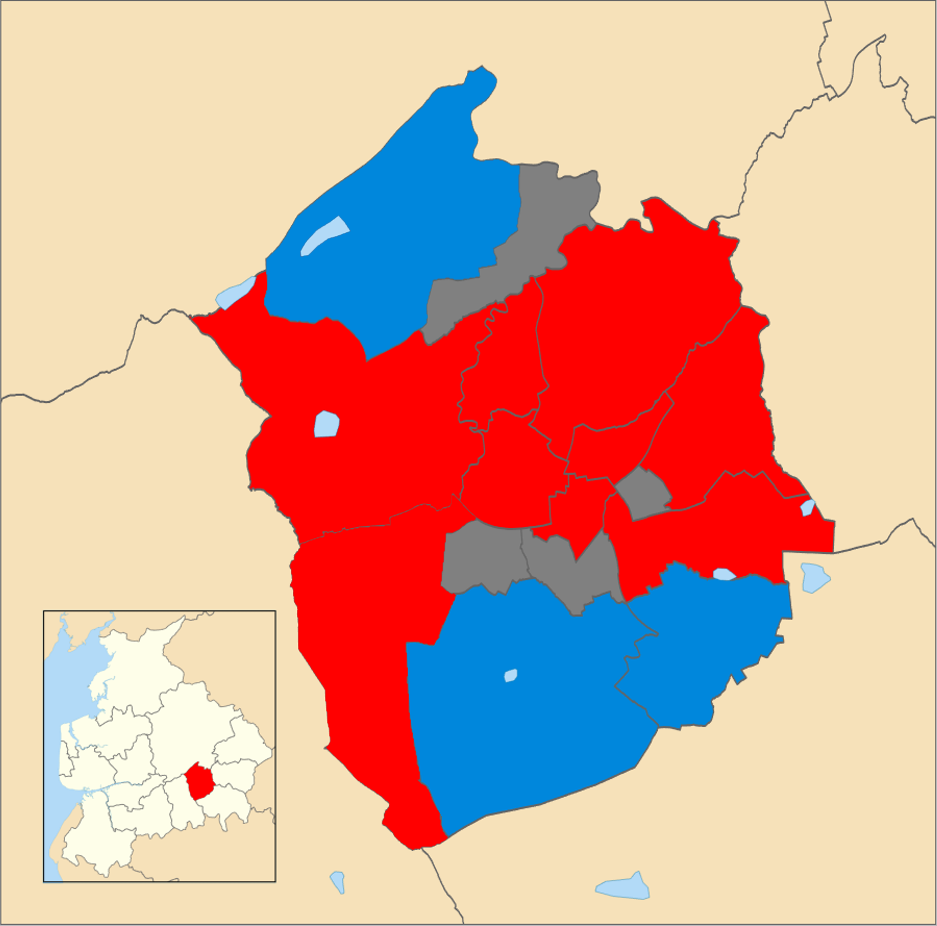
2019 results map

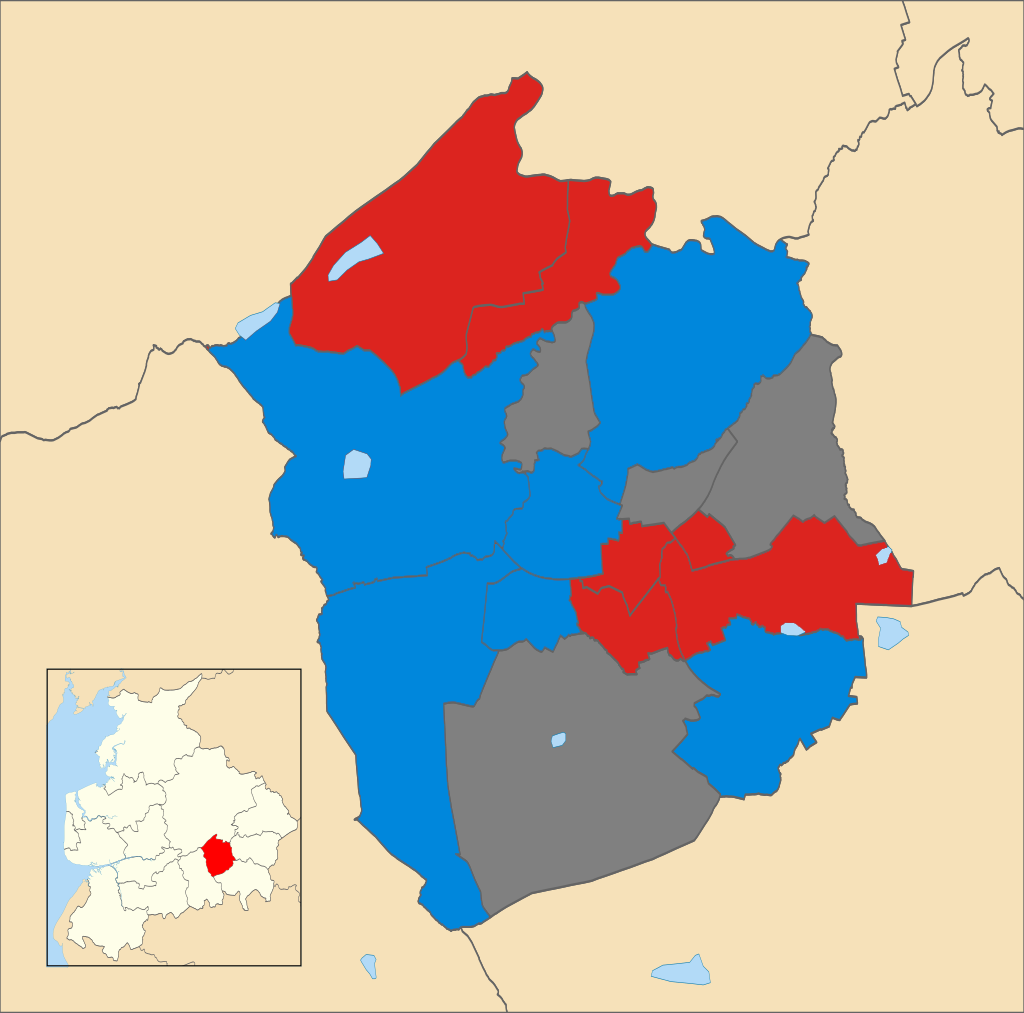
2021 results map

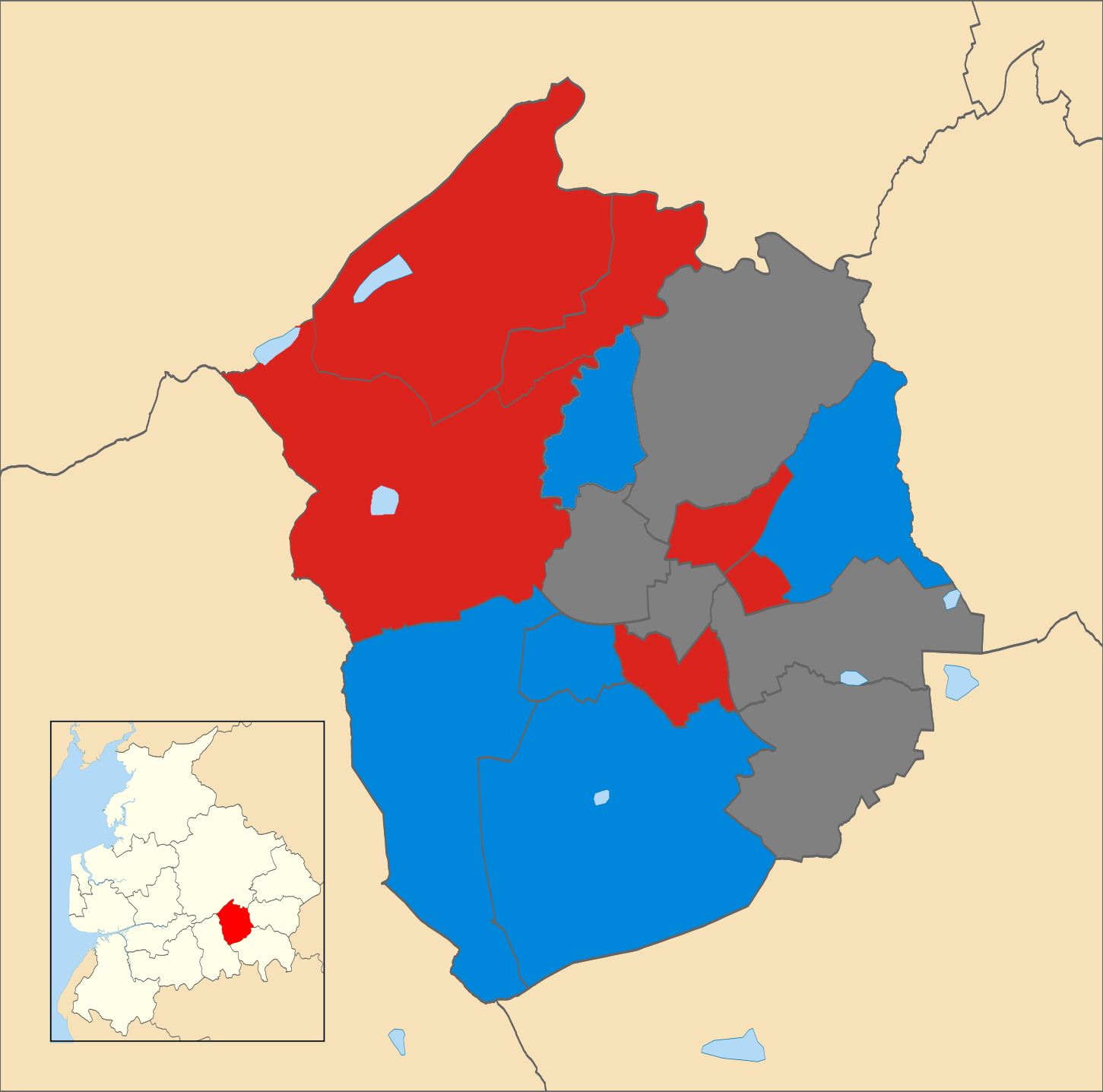
2022 results map

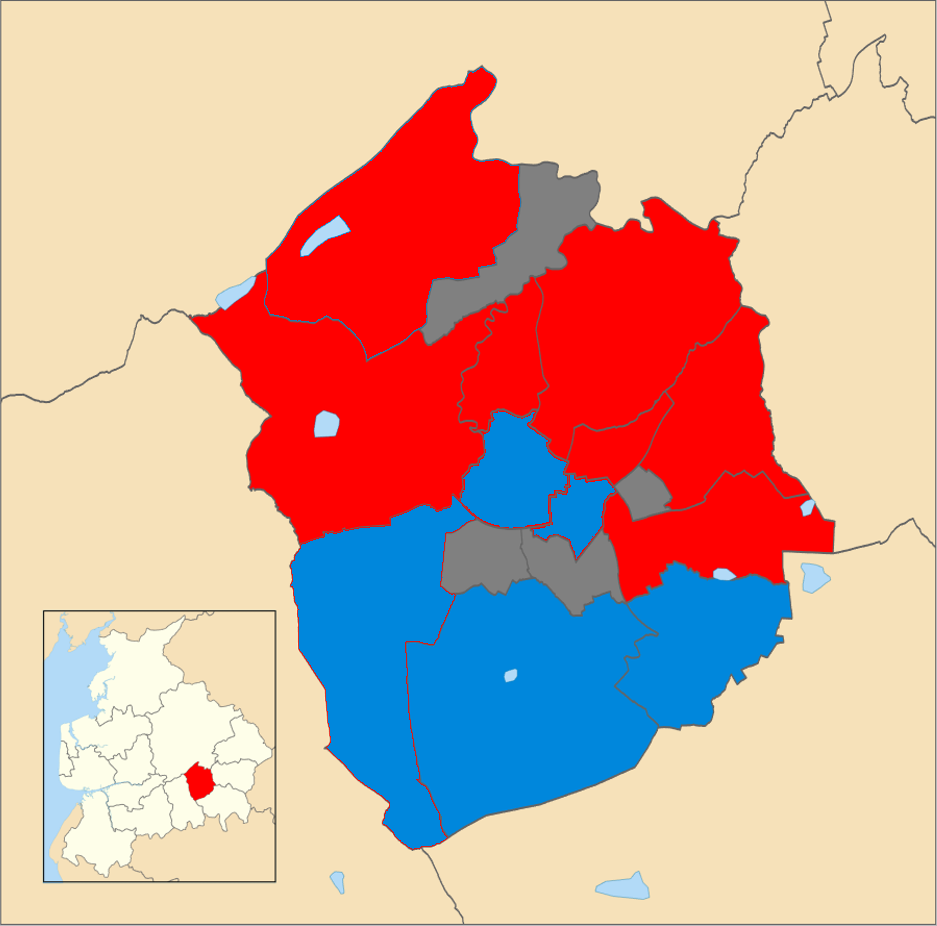
2023 results map

2024 results map

2026 results map

== By-election results ==
=== 1998-2002 ===
Netherton by-election 13 July 2000
Party	Candidate	Votes	%	±%
Labour		702	61.7	+14.8
Conservative		436	38.3	−14.8
Majority		266	23.4	
Turnout		1,138	31.9	
Labour gain from Independent		Swing		

Huncoat by-election 11 October 2001
Party	Candidate	Votes	%	±%
Labour		339	64.1	+12.9
Conservative		190	35.9	+35.9
Majority		149	28.2	
Turnout		529	16.5	
Labour gain from Conservative		Swing		

Immanuel by-election 11 October 2001
Party	Candidate	Votes	%	±%
Labour		387	53.8	+11.2
Conservative		333	46.2	−11.2
Majority		54	7.6	
Turnout		720	19.5	
Labour gain from Conservative		Swing		

=== 2002-2006 ===
Rishton by-election 17 March 2005
Party	Candidate	Votes	%	±%
Labour	Claire Hamilton	759	46.1	+5.6
Conservative	Stan Horne	756	46.0	−13.5
Liberal Democrats	Bill Greene	129	7.8	+7.8
Majority		3	0.1	
Turnout		1,644	32.2	
Labour gain from Conservative		Swing		

Overton by-election 30 June 2005
Party	Candidate	Votes	%	±%
Labour	Susan Shorrock	774	47.5	+2.6
Conservative	Roy Atkinson	593	36.4	−18.7
BNP	Carrie Cassidy	191	11.7	+11.7
Liberal Democrats	Bill Greene	72	4.4	+4.4
Majority		178	11.1	
Turnout		1,630	32.6	
Labour gain from Conservative		Swing		

=== 2006-2010 ===
Spring Hill by-election 21 September 2006
Party	Candidate	Votes	%	±%
Labour	Munsif Dad	528	68.1	−3.2
Conservative	Michaek Szewczuk	247	31.9	+3.2
Majority		281	36.2	
Turnout		775	22.1	
Labour hold		Swing		

Rishton by-election 2 November 2006
Party	Candidate	Votes	%	±%
Labour	Harry Grayson	1,112	55.2	+5.9
Conservative	Stan Horne	848	42.1	−9.6
Liberal Democrats	Bill Green	54	2.7	+2.7
Majority		264	13.1	
Turnout		2,014	39.7	
Labour gain from Conservative		Swing		

=== 2010-2014 ===
Peel by-election 1 July 2010
Party	Candidate	Votes	%	±%
Labour	Wendy Dwyer	592	75.8	+4.5
Conservative	Danny Cassidy	189	24.2	−4.5
Majority		403	51.6	
Turnout		781	25.7	
Labour hold		Swing		

Baxenden by-election 18 November 2010
Party	Candidate	Votes	%	±%
Conservative	Terry Hurn	693	58.2	−12.8
Labour	David Hartley	434	36.4	+17.8
Independent	Lesley Wolstencroft	47	3.9	+3.9
UKIP	Bobby Anwar	17	1.4	+1.4
Majority		259	21.7	
Turnout		1,191	36	
Conservative hold		Swing		

=== 2014-2018 ===
Spring Hill by-election 9 July 2015
Party	Candidate	Votes	%	±%
Labour	Diane Fielding	778	55.3	+5.4
Conservative	Mohammed Sadfar	475	33.8	−0.4
UKIP	Ken Smith	137	9.7	−6.1
Green	Kerry Gormley	17	1.2	+1.2
Majority		303	21.5	
Turnout		1,407		
Labour hold		Swing		

=== 2022-2026 ===
Overton by-election 14 July 2022
Party	Candidate	Votes	%	±%
Labour	Colin McKenzie	773	52.2	+6.4
Conservative	Liz McGinley	600	40.5	−0.1
Independent	Michael Miller	71	4.8	+4.8
Reform	Richard Oakley	36	2.4	−10.1
Majority		173	11.7	+6.5
Turnout		1,482	31.32	
Labour hold		Swing		

Baxenden by-election 6 February 2025
Party	Candidate	Votes	%	±%
Conservative	David Heap	406	35.7	−13.2
Reform	Ashley Joynes	368	32.3	+32.3
Labour	Richard Downie	328	28.8	−22.3
Green	Lex Kristan	36	3.2	+3.2
Majority		38	3.3	
Turnout		1,138		
Conservative gain from Labour		Swing		

Huncoat by-election 12 November 2026
Party	Candidate	Votes	%	±%
Labour	Jackie Rawstron	318	34.4	+10.5
Reform	Anna Stanislawska	275	29.8	−19.4
Restore	Mark Conlon	257	27.8	+27.8
Conservative	Shahed Mahmood	74	8.0	−2.4
Majority		43	4.7	
Turnout		924		
Labour hold		Swing		
