= 2019 Hyndburn Borough Council election =

2019 UK local government election

← 2018	2 May 2019	2021 →

12 of 35 seats to Hyndburn Borough Council 18 seats needed for a majority
	First party	Second party
Leader	Miles Parkinson	Tony Dobson
Party	Labour	Conservative
Leader's seat	Altham	Barnfield
Seats before	26	9
Seats won	26	9
Seat change	Steady	Steady
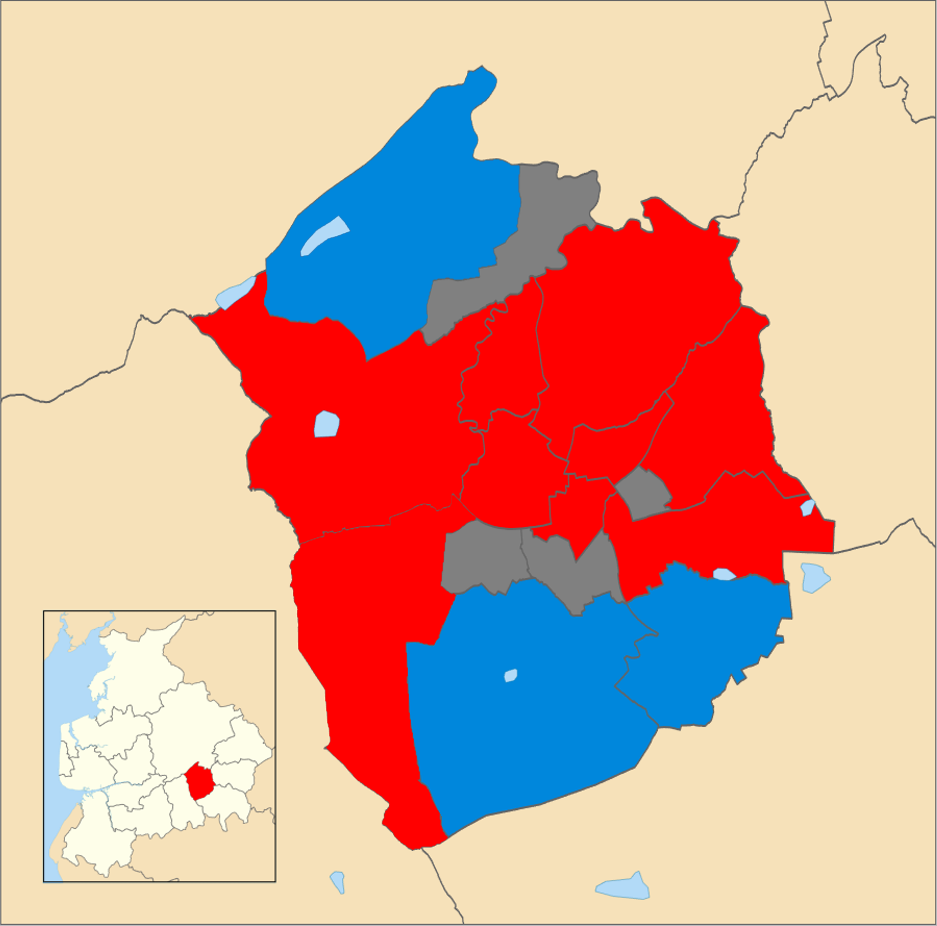
- 2019 local election results in Hyndburn Labour Conservative Not contested

A by-thirds Hyndburn Borough Council local election, was held on Thursday 2 May 2019. Approximately one third of the local council's 35 seats fell up for election on that day.

== Background ==
Before the election Labour had a majority of 26 councillors, Conservatives had 9 councillors.

== Council composition ==
Prior to the election the composition of the council was:

- Labour 26
- Conservative 9

Labour defended 9-seats and Conservatives defended 3-seats.

The local Labour and Conservative Party's both ran candidates in each of the 12 wards.

No candidates stood as potential Green or Independents councillors, in any Hyndburn ward, but UKIP candidates stood across only 2 wards.

== Local Election result ==
The majority grouping of councillors as the headline result of the election, was unchanged; with Labour retaining an overall 26-seat majority, but with two seats switching hands, one from Labour to Conservative, one from Conservative to Labour.

After the election, the composition of the council's 35 seats was -

- Labour 26
- Conservative 9

Hyndburn local election result 2019 - electorate 48,191 (over just 12 wards) - with 31.44% turnout
Party	Seats	Gains	Losses	Net gain/loss	Seats %	Votes %	Votes	+/−
Labour	9	1	-1	0	75.0	51.66	7,827	-4,900
Conservative	3	1	-1	0	25.0	40.11	6,077	-3,541
UKIP	0	0	-0	0	0.0	4.48	679	-6,490
Spoilt Ballots	...	...	...	...	0.0	3.72	563	395

Reference: 2015 Hyndburn Borough Council election

NB: Four (of the 16) Council wards, where seats were NOT up for re-election in 2019, included the following wards - Netherton, Peel, Spring Hill and St. Andrews' in Oswaldtwistle.

Previous Councillors who were Standing-Down in this election included - Clare Cleary (Lab) (Rishton).

== Ward results ==
=== Altham ===
Altham - electorate 4,088
Party	Candidate	Votes	%	±%
Labour	Miles PARKINSON	685	58.85	11.55
Conservative	Cheryl DUFFY	404	34.71	10.94
...	Spoilt Ballots	76	6.53	
Majority		281	24.14	N/A
Turnout		1,164	28.47	−31.45
Labour hold		Swing		

=== Barnfield ===
Barnfield - electorate 3,411
Party	Candidate	Votes	%	±%
Labour	June Lillian Mary HARRISON	630	60.99	15.61
Conservative	Dominic BRITCLIFFE	358	34.66	1.23
...	Spoilt Ballots	44	4.26	
Majority		282	27.30	N/A
Turnout		1,033	30.24	−30.63
Labour hold		Swing		

=== Baxenden ===
Baxenden - electorate 3,282
Party	Candidate	Votes	%	±%
Conservative	Kathleen Iris PRATT	672	54.63	10.52
Labour	Kimberley Jane WHITEHEAD	525	42.68	11.58
...	Spoilt Ballots	34	2.76	
Majority		153	12.44	N/A
Turnout		1,230	37.48	−33.54
Conservative hold		Swing		

=== Central ===
Central - electorate 3,822
Party	Candidate	Votes	%	±%
Labour	Mohammad AYUB	1,107	58.82	−6.99
Conservative	Saghir HUSSAIN	756	40.17	18.44
...	Spoilt Ballots	19	1.01	
Majority		351	18.65	N/A
Turnout		1,882	49.24	−14.19
Labour hold		Swing		

=== Church ===
Church - electorate 3,591
Party	Candidate	Votes	%	±%
Labour	Loraine Ann COX	661	62.36	6.19
Conservative	Raja Basharat KHAN	360	33.96	15.51
...	Spoilt Ballots	39	3.68	
Majority		301	28.40	N/A
Turnout		1,060	29.52	−22.75
Labour hold		Swing		

=== Clayton-le-Moors ===
Clayton-le-Moors - electorate 3,635
Party	Candidate	Votes	%	±%
Labour	Melissa Margaret FISHER	526	51.27	9.54
Conservative	Kelly Amanda PRINCE	439	42.79	8.74
...	Spoilt Ballots	60	5.85	
Majority		87	8.48	N/A
Turnout		1,026	28.23	−33.65
Labour hold		Swing		

=== Huncoat ===
Huncoat - electorate 3,674
Party	Candidate	Votes	%	±%
Labour	Eamonn HIGGINS	625	61.52	22.53
Conservative	Jake ALLEN	305	30.02	−3.79
...	Spoilt Ballots	86	8.46	
Majority		320	31.50	N/A
Turnout		1,016	27.65	−37.88
Labour hold		Swing		

=== Immanuel ===
Immanuel - electorate 3,549
Party	Candidate	Votes	%	±%
Conservative	Judith Helen ADDISON	619	65.99	22.99
Labour	Marion HARRISON	279	29.74	−1.05
...	Spoilt Ballots	40	4.26	
Majority		340	36.25	N/A
Turnout		938	26.43	−37.04
Conservative hold		Swing		

=== Milnshaw ===
Milnshaw - electorate 3,760
Party	Candidate	Votes	%	±%
Labour	Paul Ian COX	719	62.69	9.29
UKIP	Ken SMITH	228	19.88	−1.59
Conservative	Robyn BRADSHAW	186	16.22	−8.33
...	Spoilt Ballots	12	1.05	
Majority		491	42.81	N/A
Turnout		1,147	30.51	−31.05
Labour hold		Swing		

=== Overton ===
Overton - electorate 5,076
Party	Candidate	Votes	%	±%
Conservative	Patrick McGINLEY	804	50.89	17.85
Labour	Gareth MOLINEUX	708	44.81	10.59
...	Spoilt Ballots	67	4.24	
Majority		96	6.08	N/A
Turnout		1,580	31.13	−34.08
Conservative gain from Labour		Swing		

=== Rishton ===
Rishton - electorate 5,231
Party	Candidate	Votes	%	±%
Labour	Kate WALSH	695	49.82	7.49
Conservative	Sarah McCROSSAN	632	45.30	17.79
...	Spoilt Ballots	66	4.73	
Majority		63	4.52	N/A
Turnout		1,395	26.67	−35.86
Labour hold		Swing		

=== St Oswald's ===
St Oswald's - electorate 5,067
Party	Candidate	Votes	%	±%
Labour	Chris KNIGHT	667	39.70	9.89
Conservative	Lisa ALLEN	542	32.26	−5.33
UKIP	Janet BROWN	451	26.85	−5.4
...	Spoilt Ballots	20	1.19	
Majority		125	7.44	N/A
Turnout		1,680	33.16	−32.26
Labour gain from Conservative		Swing		
