= 1982 Hyndburn Borough Council election =

1982 UK local government election

Elections to Hyndburn Borough Council were held in May 1982. One third of the council was up for election. Labour were defending 8 seats, The Conservatives 7. Labour held 7 seats with the Conservatives holding their 7 and the Liberal/SDP Alliance fielding a full slate of candidates taking a seat off Labour (Baxenden).

After the election, the composition of the council was:

- Conservative (20)
- Labour (27-1=26)
- SDP (27-1=26)

Hyndburn local election result 1982
| Party | Seats | Gains | Losses | Net gain/loss | Seats % | Votes % | Votes | +/− |
|---|---|---|---|---|---|---|---|---|
| Labour | 7 | | 1 | -1 | 46.7% | 36.2% | 8,479 | -15.6% |
| Conservative | 7 | | | | 46.7% | 39.1% | 9,174 | +0.2% |
| SDP | 1 | 1 | | +1 | 6.7% | 23.9% | 5,609 | +23.9% |
| Liberal | | | | | | | | -2.6% |
| National Front | | | | | | | | |
| Independent | | | | | | | | -3% |
| Communist | | | | | | | | |
| Independent Labour | | | | | | 0.6% | 134 | +0.6% |
| Spoilt | | | | | | 0.2% | 56 | -0.2% |
| Totals | 15 | | | | | 41.8% | 23,492 | |

| Ward | 1979 1st | 1979 2nd | 1979 3rd | 1980 | 1982 |
|---|---|---|---|---|---|
| Next Up | 1980 | 1982 | 1983 | 1984 | 1986 |
| Altham Parish | - | - | Con | - | |
| Barnfield | Con | Lab | Lab | Lab | Lab |
| Baxenden | Con | Con | Con | Lab | SDP |
| Central | Lab | Lab | Lab | Lab | Lab |
| Church | Lab | Lab | Lab | Lab | Lab |
| Clayton | Con | Con | Con | Lab | Lab |
| Huncoat | Con | Lab | Con | Lab | Con |
| Immanuel | Lab | Con | Con | Lab | Con |
| Milnshaw | Con | Con | Con | Lab | Con |
| Netherton | Lab | Lab | Lab | Lab | Lab |
| Overton | Con | Con | Con | Lab | Con |
| Peel | Lab | Lab | Con | Lab | Lab |
| Rishton Eachill | Con | - | Con | Con | - |
| Rishton Norden | Con | Lab | - | Con | Con |
| Spring Hill | Lab | Lab | Lab | Lab | Lab |
| St Andrews | Con | Con | Con | Lab | Con |
| St Oswalds | Con | Con | Con | Con | Con |
-
| Councillors | 1979 | | | 1980 | 1982 |
| Labour Cllrs. | 5 | 8 | 6 | 13 | 7 |
| Cons Cllrs | 11 | 7 | 10 | 3 | 7 |
| SDP Cllrs | | | | | 1 |
-
| % of the Vote | 1979 | | | 1980 | 1982 |
| Labour | 46.6% | | | 51.8% | 36.2% |
| Conservatives | 55.0% | | | 38.9% | 39.1% |
| SDP Alliance | | | | | 23.9% |
-
| Votes | 1979 | | | 1980 | 1982 |
| Labour | 51,823 | | | 12,944 | 8,479 |
| Conservatives | 54,578 | | | 9,713 | 9,174 |
| Liberals | 2,724 | | | 1,239 | |
| SDP Alliance | | | | | 5,609 |

== Ward results ==
Barnfield- electorate 2,998
| Party | Candidate | Votes | % | ±% |
|---|---|---|---|---|
| Labour | Dave Keeley | 552 | | |
| SDP | | 441 | | |
| Conservative | | 314 | | |
| ... | spoilt votes | 2 | ... | |
| Majority | | | | |
| Turnout | | 1,307 | 43.7% | |
| Labour hold | | Swing | | |

Baxenden- electorate 3,539
| Party | Candidate | Votes | % | ±% |
|---|---|---|---|---|
| Labour | Robert Eddleston | 596 | | |
| Liberal | | 576 | | |
| Conservative | | 543 | | |
| ... | spoilt votes | 3 | ... | |
| Majority | | | | |
| Turnout | | | 48.5% | |
| Labour gain from Conservative | | Swing | | |

Central- electorate 3,950
| Party | Candidate | Votes | % | ±% |
|---|---|---|---|---|
| Labour | Basil Whitham | 1,119 | | |
| Conservative | | 417 | | |
| ... | spoilt votes | 11 | ... | |
| Majority | | | | |
| Turnout | | | 39.2% | |
| Labour hold | | Swing | | |

Church- electorate 4,843
| Party | Candidate | Votes | % | ±% |
|---|---|---|---|---|
| Labour | Phyliss Hargreaves | 1,429 | | |
| Conservative | | 658 | | |
| ... | spoilt votes | 5 | ... | |
| Majority | | | | |
| Turnout | | | 43.2% | |
| Labour hold | | Swing | | |

Clayton-le-Moors - electorate 4,180
| Party | Candidate | Votes | % | ±% |
|---|---|---|---|---|
| Labour | PS Whitham | 838 | | |
| Conservative | | 828 | | |
| Liberal | | 331 | | |
| ... | spoilt votes | 8 | ... | |
| Majority | | | | |
| Turnout | | | 48.0% | |
| Labour gain from Conservative | | Swing | | |

Huncoat - electorate 2,764
| Party | Candidate | Votes | % | ±% |
|---|---|---|---|---|
| Labour | Eddie Saville | 696 | | |
| Conservative | | 694 | | |
| ... | spoilt votes | 1 | ... | |
| Majority | | 2 | | |
| Turnout | | | 50.3% | |
| Labour gain from Conservative | | Swing | | |

Immanuel - electorate 3,369
| Party | Candidate | Votes | % | ±% |
|---|---|---|---|---|
| Labour | B Nuttall | 704 | | |
| Conservative | | 658 | | |
| ... | spoilt votes | 2 | ... | |
| Majority | | 46 | | |
| Turnout | | | 38.2% | |
| Labour hold | | Swing | | |

Milnshaw - electorate 4,188
| Party | Candidate | Votes | % | ±% |
|---|---|---|---|---|
| Labour | Graham A. Ashworth | 1,044 | | |
| Conservative | | 813 | | |
| ... | spoilt votes | 2 | ... | |
| Majority | | | | |
| Turnout | | | 44.4% | |
| Labour gain from Conservative | | Swing | | |

Netherton - electorate 3,714
| Party | Candidate | Votes | % | ±% |
|---|---|---|---|---|
| Labour | F Gregory | 1,058 | | |
| Conservative | | 722 | | |
| ... | spoilt votes | 5 | ... | |
| Majority | | | | |
| Turnout | | | 48.1% | |
| Labour hold | | Swing | | |

Overton - electorate 4,518
| Party | Candidate | Votes | % | ±% |
|---|---|---|---|---|
| Labour | J D Marsh | 910 | | |
| Conservative | | 897 | | |
| ... | spoilt votes | 2 | ... | |
| Majority | | | | |
| Turnout | | | 40.0% | |
| Labour gain from Conservative | | Swing | | |

Peel - electorate 3,861
| Party | Candidate | Votes | % | ±% |
|---|---|---|---|---|
| Labour | W Wallwork | 1,111 | | |
| Conservative | | 603 | | |
| ... | spoilt votes | 5 | ... | |
| Majority | | | | |
| Turnout | | | 44.5% | |
| Labour gain from Conservative | | Swing | | |

Rishton Eachill - electorate 2,102
| Party | Candidate | Votes | % | ±% |
|---|---|---|---|---|
| Conservative | G. D. Henry | 482 | | |
| Labour | | 350 | | |
| Liberal | | 197 | | |
| ... | spoilt votes | 1 | ... | |
| Majority | | | | |
| Turnout | | | 49.0% | |
| Conservative hold | | Swing | | |

Rishton Norden- electorate 2,538
| Party | Candidate | Votes | % | ±% |
|---|---|---|---|---|
| Conservative | | 652 | | |
| Labour | | 379 | | |
| Liberal | | 135 | | |
| ... | spoilt votes | 0 | ... | |
| Majority | | | | |
| Turnout | | | 45.9% | |
| Conservative hold | | Swing | | |

Spring Hill - electorate 4,120
| Party | Candidate | Votes | % | ±% |
|---|---|---|---|---|
| Labour | Cliff Westell | 776 | | |
| Independent | | 690 | | |
| ... | spoilt votes | 42 | ... | |
| Majority | | | | |
| Turnout | | | 36.6% | |
| Labour hold | | Swing | | |

St. Andrew's - electorate 3,238
| Party | Candidate | Votes | % | ±% |
|---|---|---|---|---|
| Labour | Alfred Newsham | 642 | | |
| Conservative | | 626 | | |
| ... | spoilt votes | 3 | ... | |
| Majority | | 16 | | |
| Turnout | | | 39.3% | |
| Labour gain from Conservative | | Swing | | |

St Oswald's - electorate 4,079
| Party | Candidate | Votes | % | ±% |
|---|---|---|---|---|
| Conservative | Bessie Margaret Sandiford | 656 | | |
| Labour | | 509 | | |
| Independent | | 302 | | |
| ... | spoilt votes | 3 | ... | |
| Majority | | | | |
| Turnout | | | 36.0% | |
| Conservative hold | | Swing | | |
