= 2008 Hyndburn Borough Council election =

2008 UK local government election

← 2007	1 May 2008	2010 →

12 of 35 seats to Hyndburn Borough Council 18 seats needed for a majority
	First party	Second party
Leader	Peter Britcliffe	Graham Jones
Party	Conservative	Labour
Leader's seat	St Andrew's	Peel
Seats before	18	15
Seats won	21	13
Seat change	▲3	▼2
- 2008 local election results in Hyndburn Labour Conservative Not contested

Elections to Hyndburn Borough Council were held on 1 May 2008. One third of the council was up for election and the Conservative Party stayed in overall control of the council. Overall turnout was 37.9%.

The Conservative Party made the only gain of the election, taking Altham ward from the Labour Party to extend their majority to 6 following the defection of Malcolm Pritchard form Labour to Independent who also included David Mason who had left the Conservatives to go Independent..

After the election, the composition of the council was:

- Conservative 21
- Labour 13
- Independent 1

== Election result ==
Hyndburn local election result 2008
Party	Seats	Gains	Losses	Net gain/loss	Seats %	Votes %	Votes	+/−
Conservative	8	1	0	+1	66.7	49.9	8,478	+1.7
Labour	4	0	1	-1	33.3	41.9	7,111	-4.1
Liberal Democrats	0	0	0	0	0.0	4.8	817	+4.8
Independent	0	0	0	0	0.0	2.3	397	-2.4
Green	0	0	0	0	0.0	1.1	181	+0.1

NB: Four (of the 16) Council ward seats that were NOT up for re-election in 2008 included the following wards – Clayton Le Moors, Huncoat, Immanuel in Oswaldtwistle and Milnshaw in Accrington.

== Ward results ==
Altham
Party	Candidate	Votes	%	±%
Conservative	Susan Haworth	653	52.4	+14.4
Labour	Paula Landers	594	47.6	−14.4
Majority		59	4.8	
Turnout		1,247	32.1	−2.1
Conservative gain from Labour		Swing		

Barnfield
Party	Candidate	Votes	%	±%
Conservative	Tony Dobson	819	64.9	+9.0
Labour	Chris McCormack	261	20.7	−10.0
Green	Kerry Gormley	181	14.4	+1.1
Majority		558	44.2	+19.0
Turnout		1,261	40.0	−0.9
Conservative hold		Swing		

Baxenden
Party	Candidate	Votes	%	±%
Conservative	John Griffiths	866	71.0	−1.6
Labour	Vivienne Preston	227	18.6	−8.8
Liberal Democrats	David Daly	126	10.3	+10.3
Majority		639	52.4	+7.2
Turnout		1,219	37.6	−0.4
Conservative hold		Swing		

Central
Party	Candidate	Votes	%	±%
Conservative	Allah Dad	857	41.9	−0.7
Labour	Tariq Ali	637	31.2	−26.2
Liberal Democrats	Ifty Khan	550	26.9	+26.9
Majority		220	10.7	
Turnout		2,044	56.7	+8.2
Conservative hold		Swing		

Church
Party	Candidate	Votes	%	±%
Labour	Joan Smith	592	57.3	−4.6
Conservative	Simon Taylor	442	42.7	+4.6
Majority		150	14.6	−9.2
Turnout		1,034	32.6	−3.9
Labour hold		Swing		

Netherton
Party	Candidate	Votes	%	±%
Conservative	Lynn Wilson	486	37.0	−5.9
Labour	Robert Kearney	429	32.7	−24.4
Independent	Ian Robinson	397	30.3	+30.3
Majority		57	4.3	
Turnout		1,312	40.5	−1.1
Conservative hold		Swing		

Overton
Party	Candidate	Votes	%	±%
Conservative	Peter Clarke	1,022	55.5	−2.1
Labour	Ciaran Wells	821	44.5	+2.1
Majority		201	11.0	−4.2
Turnout		1,843	37.7	+3.2
Conservative hold		Swing		

Peel
Party	Candidate	Votes	%	±%
Labour	Graham Jones	584	71.7	+4.3
Conservative	Clive Fisher	230	28.3	−4.3
Majority		354	43.4	+8.6
Turnout		814	26.4	+1.9
Labour hold		Swing		

Rishton
Party	Candidate	Votes	%	±%
Labour	Harry Grayson	1,403	62.8	+14.9
Conservative	Dennis Baron	831	37.2	−14.9
Majority		572	25.6	
Turnout		2,234	46.2	+4.7
Labour hold		Swing		

Spring Hill
Party	Candidate	Votes	%	±%
Labour	Munsif Dad	689	57.9	−13.4
Conservative	Mohammed Safdar	502	42.1	+13.4
Majority		187	15.8	−26.8
Turnout		1,191	34.4	+0.5
Labour hold		Swing		

St. Andrew's
Party	Candidate	Votes	%	±%
Conservative	Brian Walmsley	636	59.4	+10.3
Labour	John McCormack	294	27.5	−10.3
Liberal Democrats	Bill Greene	141	13.2	+0.1
Majority		342	31.9	+20.6
Turnout		1,071	33.4	−10.3
Conservative hold		Swing		

St Oswald's
Party	Candidate	Votes	%	±%
Conservative	Marlene Haworth	1,134	66.2	+3.4
Labour	Bill Pinder	580	33.8	−3.4
Majority		554	32.4	+6.8
Turnout		1,714	33.7	−0.1
Conservative hold		Swing		
