= 2002 Hyndburn Borough Council election =

2002 UK local government election

- 2 May 2002

All 35 seats to Hyndburn Borough Council 18 seats needed for a majority
	First party	Second party
Leader	Ian Ormerod	Peter Britcliffe
Party	Labour	Conservative
Leader's seat	Milnshaw	St Andrew's
Seats before	16	31
Seats won	18	17
Seat change	▲2	▼14
- 2002 local election results in Hyndburn. Circles represent wards where multiple seats were contested. Labour Conservative Not contested

Elections to Hyndburn Borough Council were held on 2 May 2002. The whole council was up for election with boundary changes since the last election in 2000 reducing the number of seats by 12. The Labour party gained overall control of the council from the Conservative party.

== Election result ==
Hyndburn local election result 2002
Party	Seats	Gains	Losses	Net gain/loss	Seats %	Votes %	Votes	+/−
Labour	18			0	51.4	49.7	22,083	
Conservative	17			-12	48.6	49.4	21,947	
Independent	0			0	0	0.8	377	

Boundary changes took place for the 2002 election. The number of councillors was reduced from 45 to 35 but the number of wards remained similar but not exactly the same.

== Ward results ==
Altham (2)
Party	Candidate	Votes	%	±%
Labour	David Myles	583		
Labour	Miles Parkinson	577		
Conservative	Janet Storey	449		
Conservative	Alison Gabryszak	447		
Turnout		2,056		

Barnfield (2)
Party	Candidate	Votes	%	±%
Conservative	Anthony Dobson	625		
Labour	Wendy Dwyer	614		
Conservative	Derek Scholes	582		
Labour	Stephen Walsh	534		
Turnout		2,355		

Baxenden (2)
Party	Candidate	Votes	%	±%
Conservative	John Griffiths	808		
Conservative	James Dickinson	807		
Labour	Ian Mason	412		
Labour	Anne Ormerod	367		
Turnout		2,394		

Central (2)
Party	Candidate	Votes	%	±%
Labour	Sardar Ali	720		
Conservative	Siddique Kazi	686		
Labour	Abdul Khan	657		
Conservative	Alma Pilkington	542		
Turnout		2,605		

Church (2)
Party	Candidate	Votes	%	±%
Labour	Jean Battle	788		
Labour	John Broadley	771		
Conservative	Edmund Hogan	450		
Conservative	Marion Raynor	434		
Turnout		2,443		

Clayton-Le-Moors (2)
Party	Candidate	Votes	%	±%
Labour	Timothy O'Kane	569		
Labour	John Burke	510		
Conservative	Angela Taylor	478		
Conservative	Michael Taylor	476		
Independent	John Cooper	377		
Turnout		2,410		

Huncoat (2)
Party	Candidate	Votes	%	±%
Labour	David Parkins	859		
Labour	Brendan Shiel	678		
Conservative	Patricia Scholes	326		
Conservative	Elsbeth Mills	326		
Turnout		2,189		

Immanuel (2)
Party	Candidate	Votes	%	±%
Conservative	Sandra Hayes	644		
Conservative	Jean Lockwood	597		
Labour	Edwina McCormack	575		
Labour	Dennis Baron	541		
Turnout		2,357		

Milnshaw (2)
Party	Candidate	Votes	%	±%
Labour	Ian Ormerod	805		
Labour	Malcolm Pritchard	726		
Conservative	Gordon Mills	637		
Conservative	Paul Travis	612		
Turnout		2,780		

Netherton (2)
Party	Candidate	Votes	%	±%
Labour	Mohamed Rahman	684		
Labour	Susan Shorrock	601		
Conservative	Keith Hargreaves	551		
Conservative	Adele Atkinson	539		
Turnout		2,375		

Overton (3)
Party	Candidate	Votes	%	±%
Conservative	Winifred Frankland	963		
Conservative	Peter Clarke	936		
Conservative	David Mason	880		
Labour	George Slynn	698		
Labour	William Whitaker	684		
Labour	Brenda Haworth	638		
Turnout		4,799		

Peel (2)
Party	Candidate	Votes	%	±%
Labour	Bernard Dawson	601		
Labour	Graham Jones	569		
Conservative	John Cunliffe	295		
Conservative	Derek Barden	272		
Turnout		1,737		

Rishton (3)
Party	Candidate	Votes	%	±%
Conservative	June Butler	1,026		
Conservative	Anne Scaife	881		
Conservative	Stanley Horne	813		
Labour	Winifred Jackson	734		
Labour	Gerald Newton	693		
Labour	Frances Molloy	663		
Turnout		4,810		

St Andrew's (2)
Party	Candidate	Votes	%	±%
Conservative	Peter Britcliffe	729		
Conservative	Brian Walmsley	705		
Labour	Dorothy Westell	594		
Labour	Maurice Cowell	545		
Turnout		2,573		

St Oswald's (3)
Party	Candidate	Votes	%	±%
Conservative	Douglas Hayes	924		
Conservative	George Griffiths	858		
Conservative	Brian Roberts	850		
Labour	John McCormack	639		
Labour	Leonard Neil	559		
Labour	Gary Jones	550		
Turnout		4,380		

Spring Hill (2)
Party	Candidate	Votes	%	±%
Labour	Pamela Barton	696		
Labour	Edith Dunston	649		
Conservative	Paul Barton	401		
Conservative	Abdul Qayyum	398		
Turnout		2,144		
