= 2004 Hyndburn Borough Council election =

2004 UK local government election

← 2003	10 June 2004	2006 →

12 of 35 seats to Hyndburn Borough Council 18 seats needed for a majority
	First party	Second party
Leader	Peter Britcliffe	Jean Battle
Party	Conservative	Labour
Leader's seat	St Andrew's	Church
Seats before	18	17
Seats won	20	15
Seat change	▲2	▼2
- 2004 local election results in Hyndburn Labour Conservative Not contested

Elections to Hyndburn Borough Council, England were held on 10 June 2004. One third of the council was up for election and the Conservative party stayed in overall control of the council.

After the election, the composition of the council was

- Conservative 20
- Labour 15

== Election result ==
Hyndburn local election result 2004
Party	Seats	Gains	Losses	Net gain/loss	Seats %	Votes %	Votes	+/−
Conservative	8	2	0	+2	66.7	48.2	9,310	-2.3%
Labour	4	0	2	-2	33.3	42.8	8,256	-4.3%
Liberal Democrats	0	0	0	0	0	4.8	929	+4.8%
Green	0	0	0	0	0	2.9	552	+0.6%
Independent	0	0	0	0	0	1.4	265	+1.4%

== Ward results ==
Altham
Party	Candidate	Votes	%	±%
Labour	David Myles	767	52.4	−3.7
Conservative	Jennet Liddle	696	47.6	+3.7
Majority		71	4.8	−7.4
Turnout		1,463	40.2	
Labour hold		Swing		

Barnfield
Party	Candidate	Votes	%	±%
Conservative	Anthony Dobson	638	39.9	+4.7
Green	Ian Dixon	552	34.6	+3.8
Labour	Gerald Newton	407	25.5	−8.5
Majority		86	5.3	+4.1
Turnout		1,597	49.1	
Conservative hold		Swing		

Baxenden
Party	Candidate	Votes	%	±%
Conservative	John Griffiths	816	53.0	−17.2
Labour	Ian Mason	362	23.5	−6.3
Liberal Democrats	Leslie Jones	362	23.5	+23.5
Majority		454	29.5	−10.9
Turnout		1,540	48.2	
Conservative hold		Swing		

Central
Party	Candidate	Votes	%	±%
Conservative	Allah Dad	968	53.8	−8.2
Labour	Sardar Ali	831	46.2	+8.2
Majority		137	7.6	−16.4
Turnout		1,799	56.1	
Conservative gain from Labour		Swing		

Church
Party	Candidate	Votes	%	±%
Labour	Jean Battle	662	48.0	−10.0
Conservative	Stanley Home	451	32.7	−9.3
Independent	Matthew Hartley	265	19.2	+19.2
Majority		211	15.3	−0.7
Turnout		1,378	40.7	
Labour hold		Swing		

Netherton
Party	Candidate	Votes	%	±%
Conservative	Lynn Wilson	742	52.4	
Labour	Susan Shorrock	673	47.6	
Majority		69	4.8	
Turnout		1,415	44.0	
Conservative gain from Labour		Swing		

Overton
Party	Candidate	Votes	%	±%
Conservative	Peter Clarke	1,189	55.1	+3.2
Labour	Dennis Baron	969	44.9	−3.2
Majority		220	10.2	+6.4
Turnout		2,158	44.7	
Conservative hold		Swing		

Peel
Party	Candidate	Votes	%	±%
Labour	Graham Jones	710	67.8	
Conservative	Derek Scholes	337	32.2	
Majority		373	35.6	
Turnout		1,047	33.7	
Labour hold		Swing		

Rishton
Party	Candidate	Votes	%	±%
Conservative	Ann Scaife	1,229	59.5	+11.7
Labour	David Forshaw	837	40.5	−11.7
Majority		392	19.0	
Turnout		2,066	41.5	
Conservative hold		Swing		

St. Andrew's
Party	Candidate	Votes	%	±%
Conservative	Brian Walmsley	589	43.3	
Labour	Edwina McCormack	451	33.2	
Liberal Democrats	William Greene	319	23.5	
Majority		138	10.1	
Turnout		1,359	43.5	
Conservative hold		Swing		

St Oswald's
Party	Candidate	Votes	%	±%
Conservative	Marlene Haworth	1,195	57.8	+2.1
Labour	John McCormack	873	42.2	−2.1
Majority		322	15.6	+4.2
Turnout		2,068	41.5	
Conservative hold		Swing		

Spring Hill
Party	Candidate	Votes	%	±%
Labour	Edith Dunston	714	50.2	
Conservative	Abdul Qayyum	460	32.3	
Liberal Democrats	Javed Iqbal	248	17.4	
Majority		254	17.9	
Turnout		1,422	43.0	
Labour hold		Swing		
