= 2014 Hyndburn Borough Council election =

2014 UK local government election

← 2012	22 May 2014	2015 →

11 of 35 seats to Hyndburn Borough Council 18 seats needed for a majority
	First party	Second party
Leader	Miles Parkinson	Peter Britcliffe
Party	Labour	Conservative
Leader's seat	Altham	St Andrew's
Seats before	23	9
Seats won	23	8
Seat change	Steady	▼1
	Third party	Fourth party
Leader	Paul Thompson
Party	UKIP	Independent
Leader's seat	St Oswald's
Seats before	0	3
Seats won	2	2
Seat change	▲2	▼1
- 2014 local election results in Hyndburn UKIP Labour Conservative Not contested

Elections to Hyndburn Borough Council were held on 22 May 2014. One third of the council was up for election and the Labour party stayed in overall control of the council.

The total registered electorate across Hyndburn comes to 43,404 potential voters. In this May 2014 election 16,766 turned out to vote - 38.63%.

There was also the European Election being held on the same day and voter turnout, across ALL voters in every Hyndburn-Ward, was much higher than usual.

Party	votes (2013)	Votes % (2013)	Votes (2009)	Votes % (2009)	+/-
UKIP	7,694	34.6%	3,906	17.5%	+16.9%
Labour Party	7,173	32.2%	5,020	22.5%	+9.7%
Conservative Party	4,454	20.0%	6,037	27.0%	-7.0%
BNP	787	3.5%	2,371	10.6%	-7.1%
Green	950	4.3%	1,135	5.1%	-2.5%
Liberal Democrats	360	1.6%	1,285	5.8%	-4.2%
English Democrats	272	1.2%	542	2.4%%	-1.2%
Pirate Party	84	0.4%			
An Ind. from Europe Party	400	1.8%			
No2EU	56	0.3%	348	1.6%	-1.3%
Socialist Equality Party	39	0.2%			
Christian Party	Did not stand		368	1.6%	
Jury Team	Did not stand		136	0.6%	
Pro Democracy	Did not stand		81	0.4%	
Socialist Labour Party	Did not stand		371	1.7%	
Francis Apaloo Ind	Did not stand		93	0.4%	
Rejected	183	0.8%	300	1.3%	-0.5%
TURNOUT	22,269	37.32%	22,353		

== Background ==
Before the election Labour had a majority of 23 councillors, Conservatives had 9 councillors, while Independent (politician) had 3 councillors.

Labour and UKIP candidates contested for every ward, Conservative candidates contested all except Milnshaw-ward & Peel-Ward, only four Independent candidates contested in the Clayton-le-Moors-ward, Netherton-ward, Peel-ward & Rishton-ward and just three Green candidates contested for Huncoat-ward, Overton-Ward & Peel-ward.

== Local Election result ==
The majority grouping of councillors was as the headline result of the election, with Labour's majority unchanged, Independent and Conservative councillors having lost one seat each overall, and UKIP gaining two new seats:

After the election, the composition of the council was -

- Labour 23
- Conservative 8
- Independent 2
- UKIP 2

Hyndburn Local Election Result 2014 - electorate 43,412 (over just 11 wards)
Party	Seats	Gains	Losses	Net gain/loss	Seats %	Votes %	Votes	+/−
Labour	7	2	-2	0	65.7	40.3%	6,694	-0.9%
UKIP	2	2	0	2	5.7	30.1%	4,990	+30.1%
Conservative	2	1	-2	-1	22.8	25.3%	4,197	-13.7%
Independent	0	0	-1	-1	5.7	2.9%	487	-14.0%
Green	0	0	0	0	0	1.4%	227	+1.4%

Reference: 2010 Hyndburn Borough Council election#Local Election result

NB: Five (of the 16) Council ward seats that were NOT up for re-election in 2014 included the following wards - Altham, Baxenden and Church, plus Barnfield and Central in Accrington. Although voters across those same Five wards, were also still able to vote in the European Election.

== Ward results ==
=== Clayton-le-Moors ===
Clayton-le-Moors - electorate 3688
Party	Candidate	Votes	%	±%
Labour	Tim O'Kane	465	35.33	
Conservative	Stephen Brierley	364	27.66	
UKIP	Peter Street	325	24.69	
Independent	Janet Storey	152	11.55	
...	spoilt votes	8	...	
Majority		101	2.74	N/A
Turnout		1,316	35.89	
Labour hold		Swing		

=== Huncoat ===
Huncoat - electorate 3658
Party	Candidate	Votes	%	±%
Labour	Bernard Dawson	457	34.54	
Conservative	Nick Whittaker	396	29.93	
UKIP	Mark Anthony Taylor	377	28.49	
Green	David Daly	89	6.72	
...	spoilt votes	4	...	
Majority		61	1.67	N/A
Turnout		1,323	36.22	
Labour gain from Conservative		Swing		

=== Immanuel ===
Immanuel - electorate 3382
Party	Candidate	Votes	%	±%
Conservative	Julie Anne Livesey	516	37.63	
Labour	Colette McCormack	480	35.01	
UKIP	Christopher Matthew	365	26.62	
...	spoilt votes	8	...	
Majority		36	1.06	N/A
Turnout		1,371	38.48	
Conservative gain from Labour		Swing		

=== Milnshaw ===
Milnshaw - electorate 3574
Party	Candidate	Votes	%	±%
UKIP	Malcolm Eric Pritchard	701	51.62	
Labour	Clare Pritchard	589	43.37	
...	spoilt votes	68	...	
Majority		112	3.13	N/A
Turnout		1,358	38.32	
UKIP gain from Labour		Swing		

=== Netherton ===
Netherton - electorate 3340
Party	Candidate	Votes	%	±%
Labour	Bernadette Parkinson	731	51.47	
UKIP	Carole Guilfoyle	330	23.23	
Independent	Maureen Tomlinson	197	13.87	
Conservative	Josh Allen	158	11.12	
...	spoilt votes	6	...	
Majority		401	12.01	N/A
Turnout		1,420	42.77	
Labour hold		Swing		

=== Overton ===
Overton - electorate 5055
Party	Candidate	Votes	%	±%
Labour	Jenny Nedwell	722	36.50	
UKIP	Ian Robinson	713	36.04	
Conservative	Peter Clarke	439	22.19	
Green	Joan Elizabeth West	99	5.00	
...	spoilt votes	6	...	
Majority		9	0.18	N/A
Turnout		1,978	39.24	
Labour gain from Independent		Swing		

=== Peel ===
Peel - electorate 3198
Party	Candidate	Votes	%	±%
Labour	Joyce Plummer	568	60.81	
UKIP	Alex Ross	266	28.47	
Independent	Sarah Susan Johnson	57	6.10	
Green	Kerry Gormley	39	4.17	
...	spoilt votes	4	...	
Majority		302	9.44	N/A
Turnout		934	29.32	
Labour hold		Swing		

=== Rishton ===
Rishton - electorate 5214
Party	Candidate	Votes	%	±%
Labour	Ken Moss	924	46.29	
UKIP	David George Dowling	554	27.75	
Conservative	Warren Melia	426	21.34	
Independent	Sam Howarth	81	4.05	
...	spoilt votes	10	...	
Majority		370	7.10	N/A
Turnout		1,993	38.43	
Labour hold		Swing		

=== Spring Hill ===
Spring Hill - electorate 3701
Party	Candidate	Votes	%	±%
Labour	Pam Barton	877	49.66	
Conservative	Mohammed Safdar	601	34.04	
UKIP	Ken Smith	278	15.74	
...	spoilt votes	10	...	
Majority		276	7.46	N/A
Turnout		1,766	48.11	
Labour hold		Swing		

=== St. Andrew's ===
St. Andrew's - electorate 3498
Party	Candidate	Votes	%	±%
Conservative	Peter Britcliffe	646	48.64	
Labour	Stewart Thurston Eaves	368	27.71	
UKIP	Dayle Taylor	301	22.66	
...	spoilt votes	14	...	
Majority		278	7.95	N/A
Turnout		1,328	38.15	
Conservative hold		Swing		

=== St. Oswald's ===
St. Oswald's - electorate 5104
Party	Candidate	Votes	%	±%
UKIP	Paul Thompson	801	40.53	
Conservative	Doug Hayes	651	32.94	
Labour	Susan Young	531	26.87	
...	spoilt votes	6	...	
Majority		150	2.94	N/A
Turnout		1,976	38.87	
UKIP gain from Conservative		Swing		
