= 2006 Hyndburn Borough Council election =

2006 UK local government election

← 2004	4 May 2006	2007 →

11 of 35 seats to Hyndburn Borough Council 18 seats needed for a majority

	First party	Second party
Leader	Peter Britcliffe	Graham Jones
Party	Conservative	Labour
Leader's seat	St Andrew's	Peel
Seats before	20	15
Seats after	19	15
Seat change	▼1	Steady
	Third party
Leader	Nick Collingridge
Party	Independent
Seats before	0
Seats after	1
Seat change	▲1
- 2006 local election results in Hyndburn Labour Conservative Independent Not contested

Elections to Hyndburn Borough Council were held on 4 May 2006. One third of the council was up for election and the Conservative party stayed in overall control of the council. Two seats had been lost to Labour in by elections in 2005 (Rishton and Overton) but both these were won back at this election. However the Conservatives did lose one seat to Labour, Immanuel Ward reducing their majority to 19. (18+2-1=19)

After the election, the composition of the council was

- Conservative 19
- Labour 15
- Independent 1

== Election result ==
Hyndburn local election result 2006
Party	Seats	Gains	Losses	Net gain/loss	Seats %	Votes %	Votes	+/−
Labour	6	1	3	-2	54.5	49.8	7,566	+7.0%
Conservative	4	2	1	+1	36.4	45.3	6,880	-2.9%
Independent	1	1	0	+1	9.1	3.6	553	+2.2%
Liberal Democrats	0	0	0	0	0	1.2	188	-3.6%

== Ward results ==
Clayton-le-Moors
Party	Candidate	Votes	%	±%
Independent	Nicholas Collingridge	553	40.0	+40.0
Labour	Tim O'Kane	459	33.2	−13.2
Conservative	Philip Storey	369	26.7	−26.9
Majority		94	6.8	
Turnout		1,381	39.6	
Independent gain from Labour		Swing		

Huncoat
Party	Candidate	Votes	%	±%
Labour	Paul Gott	593	54.1	−3.5
Conservative	Kathleen Pratt	503	45.9	+3.5
Majority		90	8.2	−7.0
Turnout		1,096	33.3	
Labour hold		Swing		

Immanuel
Party	Candidate	Votes	%	±%
Labour	Colette McCormack	640	51.2	+3.7
Conservative	Sandra Hayes	611	48.8	−3.7
Majority		29	2.4	
Turnout		1,251	36.9	
Labour gain from Conservative		Swing		

Milnshaw
Party	Candidate	Votes	%	±%
Labour	Clare Pritchard	719	56.8	+3.1
Conservative	Stanley Horne	546	43.2	−3.1
Majority		173	13.6	+6.2
Turnout		1,265	37.1	
Labour hold		Swing		

Netherton
Party	Candidate	Votes	%	±%
Labour	Mohammed Rahman	780	57.1	+9.5
Conservative	Dennis Baron	585	42.9	−9.5
Majority		195	14.2	
Turnout		1,365	41.6	−2.4
Labour hold		Swing		

Susan Shorrocks had won the seat for Labour from the Conservatives 30 June 2005 after the resignation of Wyn Frankland. The Conservatives won it back at this election.

Overton
Party	Candidate	Votes	%	±%
Conservative	Roy Atkinson	956	53.8	−1.3
Labour	Rob Kearney	822	46.2	+1.3
Majority		134	7.6	−2.6
Turnout		1,778	36.0	−8.7
Conservative hold		Swing		

Peel
Party	Candidate	Votes	%	±%
Labour	Bernard Dawson	514	67.4	−0.4
Conservative	Derek Wolstenholme	249	32.6	+0.4
Majority		265	34.8	−0.8
Turnout		763	24.5	−9.2
Labour hold		Swing		

Claire Hamilton had won the seat for Labour from the Conservatives 17 March 2005 following the death of June Butler. The Conservatives won it back at this election.

Rishton
Party	Candidate	Votes	%	±%
Conservative	Jennet Liddle	1,022	51.2	−8.3
Labour	Claire Hamilton	975	48.8	+8.3
Majority		47	2.4	−16.6
Turnout		1,997	39.7	−1.8
Conservative hold		Swing		

St. Andrew's
Party	Candidate	Votes	%	±%
Conservative	Peter Britcliffe	704	49.1	+5.8
Labour	Gayle Knight	542	37.8	+4.6
Liberal Democrats	Bill Greene	188	13.1	−10.4
Majority		162	11.3	+1.2
Turnout		1,434	43.7	+0.2
Conservative hold		Swing		

St Oswald's
Party	Candidate	Votes	%	±%
Conservative	Doug Hayes	997	59.3	+1.5
Labour	William Pinder	684	40.7	−1.5
Majority		313	18.6	+3.0
Turnout		1,681	33.3	−8.2
Conservative hold		Swing		

Spring Hill
Party	Candidate	Votes	%	±%
Labour	Pam Barton	838	71.3	+21.1
Conservative	Imran Arif	338	28.7	−3.6
Majority		500	42.6	+24.7
Turnout		1,176	33.9	−9.1
Labour hold		Swing		
