= 2021 Hyndburn Borough Council election =

2021 UK local government election

- 6 May 2021

13 of 35 seats to Hyndburn Borough Council 18 seats needed for a majority
- Turnout: 36%
	First party	Second party
Leader	Miles Parkinson	Marlene Haworth
Party	Labour	Conservative
Leader's seat	Altham	St Oswald's
Seats before	25	7
Seats won	22	12
Seat change	▼4	▲4
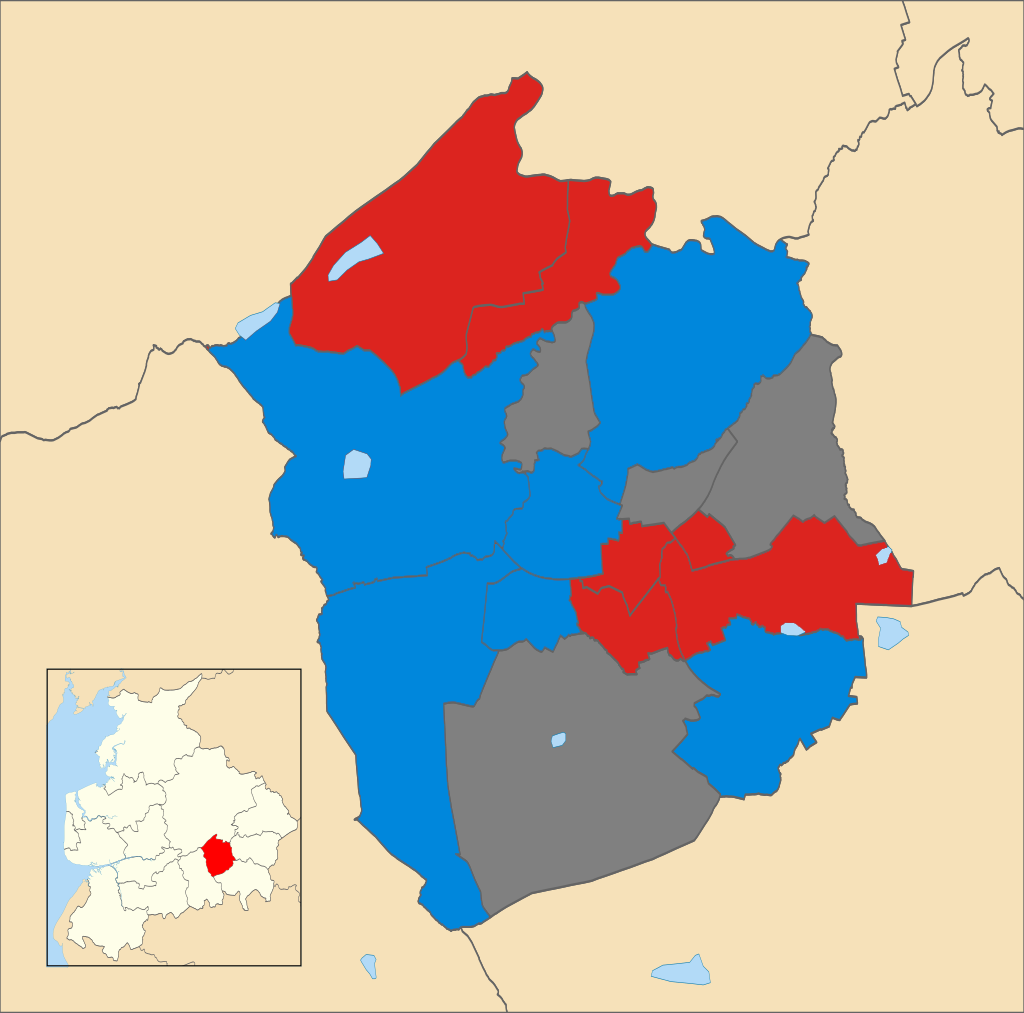
- 2021 local election results in Hyndburn Labour Conservative Not contested

A by-thirds Hyndburn Borough Council local election (postponed since March 2020, due to the Coronavirus outbreak), was held on Thursday 6 May 2021. Approximately one third of the local council's 35 seats fell up for election on that day.

This election, postponed for 12 months since 2020, took place at the same time as the regularly scheduled 2021 Lancashire County Council elections and the rescheduled Lancashire Police & Crime Commissioner elections.

== Background ==
Before the election Labour had a majority of 25 councillors, Conservatives had 7 councillors, with 1 Independent councillor who had previously been a Conservative and had since resigned from that party and become an Independent, plus 2 Vacant seats where after councillor Stephanie Haworth opted to stand-down (in 2020) her seat was left Vacant (during the covid pandemic) and the other suddenly became vacant (in March 2020) following the death of long-serving councillor Tony Dobson, who had also originally planned to stand-down (in 2020).

1. Hyndburn's Conservative MP, Sara Britcliffe was previously elected in 2018 to one of the St. Andrew's HBC-ward seats AND that vacated seat's postponed by-election is due to take place in May-2021

In this election, Labour was defending 10-ward-seats and Conservatives were defending 3-ward-seats. The winning ward-candidates will serve out only the last 3-years of a standard 4-year term in office, with those same seats coming up for re-election, in May 2024, 12-months prior to the next LCC election, in May 2025.

Candidates were also standing as potential Reform Party ward-councillors in Netherton, Overton, Rishton and St Andrew's. Candidates were also standing as potential Lib-Dem Party ward-councillors in Rishton and St Oswald's. A single Candidate stood as a potential Independent ward-councillor in Rishton. The Green Party did not stand candidates in any Hyndburn ward-seats and only contested LCC seats. There were no UKIP Candidates standing in any Hyndburn ward-seats, with just one such candidate for the Accrington North LCC-seat.

1. Candidates standing for both a HBC-ward seat AND a LCC-seat – are tagged with "(& LCC)"

== Local election result ==
Party	Leader	Councillors			Votes	
Party	Leader		Of total	Whole Council		Of total
Labour		6	46.2%	22 / 35	7,831	47.5%
Conservative Party		7	53.8%	12 / 35	7,548	45.8%
Independents		0	0.0%	1 / 35	411	2.5%
Reform UK		0	0.0%	0 / 35	404	2.5%
Liberal Democrats		0	0.0%	0 / 35	73	0.5%

Reference: 2016 Hyndburn Borough Council election

NB: Four (of 16) Council wards, where seats were NOT be up for re-election in 2021, include the following wards – Clayton Le Moors, Huncoat, Immanuel in Oswaldtwistle and Milnshaw in Accrington. However, as there was ALSO an election previously scheduled for Lancashire's next Police and Crime Commissioner, polling stations in those other Four wards would normally ALSO have been OPEN to accept those ballots for a new Commissioner.

Previous Councillors who were looking to Stand-Down in May 2021 included – Stephanie Haworth (Lab-Overton), Jean Battle (Lab-Church) and Jeff Scales (Lab-Rishton). As well as the (Con) Barnfield seat, which became vacant in March 2020 when Councillor Tony Dobson died.

== Ward results ==
=== Altham ===
Altham – Electorate 3,918
Party	Candidate	Votes	%	±%
Conservative	Dominik ALLEN	632	54.62	31.38
Labour	Steve BUTTON	502	43.39	−3.01
...	spoilt ballots	22	0.19	
Majority		130	11.24	N/A
Turnout		1,157	29.53	0.10
Conservative gain from Labour		Swing		

=== Barnfield ===
Barnfield – Electorate 3,284
Party	Candidate	Votes	%	±%
Labour	Caroline Elizabeth MONTAGUE	594	51.34	7.88
Conservative	Danny CASSIDY	545	47.10	0.17
...	spoilt ballots	17	1.47	
Majority		49	4.24	N/A
Turnout		1,157	35.23	−4.63
Labour gain from Conservative		Swing		

=== Baxenden ===
Baxenden – Electorate 3,226
Party	Candidate	Votes	%	±%
Conservative	Terence Keith HURN (& LCC)	779	59.19	8.45
Labour	Kimberley Jane WHITEHEAD	532	40.43	8.86
...	spoilt ballots	6	0.46	
Majority		247	18.77	N/A
Turnout		1,316	40.79	2.21
Conservative hold		Swing		

=== Central ===
Central – Electorate 3,784
Party	Candidate	Votes	%	±%
Labour	Abdul Ghafar KHAN	986	49.70	−10.03
Conservative	Mohammed YOUNIS (& LCC)	963	48.54	9.67
...	spoilt ballots	31	1.56	
Majority		23	1.16	N/A
Turnout		1,984	52.43	1.29
Labour hold		Swing		

=== Church ===
Church – Electorate 3,476
Party	Candidate	Votes	%	±%
Conservative	Sajid MAHMOOD	595	51.07	32.94
Labour	Clare PRITCHARD	545	46.78	−33.24
...	spoilt ballots	35	3.00	
Majority		50	4.29	N/A
Turnout		1,165	33.52	5.34
Conservative gain from Labour		Swing		

=== Netherton ===
Netherton – Electorate 3,385
Party	Candidate	Votes	%	±%
Labour	Noordad AZIZ (& LCC)	745	59.74	8.79
Conservative	Peter EDWARDS	417	33.44	5.12
Reform	Sarah-Kay Margaret FITZHARRIS	70	5.61	N/A
...	spoilt ballots	15	1.20	
Majority		328	26.30	N/A
Turnout		1,247	36.84	−4.84
Labour hold		Swing		

=== Overton ===
Overton – Electorate 4,796
Party	Candidate	Votes	%	±%
Labour	Michael John HINDLEY	787	45.73	6.25
Conservative	Gareth Jason MOLINEUX (& LCC)	698	40.56	4.62
Reform	Wayne James FITZHARRIS (& LCC)	215	12.49	N/A
...	spoilt ballots	21	1.22	
Majority		89	5.17	N/A
Turnout		1,721	35.88	−2.58
Labour hold		Swing		

=== Peel ===
Peel – Electorate 2,965
Party	Candidate	Votes	%	±%
Labour	Patrick SHORT	503	65.58	−3.61
Conservative	David ECCLES	245	31.94	N/A
...	spoilt ballots	18	2.35	
Majority		258	33.64	N/A
Turnout		767	25.87	−1.45
Labour hold		Swing		

=== Rishton ===
Rishton – Electorate 4,982
Party	Candidate	Votes	%	±%
Conservative	Carole Anne HAYTHORNTHWAITE (& LCC)	658	37.54	3.25
Labour	Jodi CLEMENTS	620	35.37	−6.19
Independent	Andrew Joseph HARRIS	411	23.45	N/A
Reform	Ian ROBINSON (& LCC)	39	2.22	N/A
Liberal Democrats	Adam John Thomas WALLER-SLACK (& LCC)	20	1.14	N/A
...	spoilt ballots	6	0.34	
Majority		38	2.17	N/A
Turnout		1,753	35.19	−0.52
Conservative gain from Labour		Swing		

=== Spring Hill ===
Spring Hill – Electorate 3,589
Party	Candidate	Votes	%	±%
Labour	Munsif DAD (& LCC)	792	59.15	−17.33
Conservative	Saghir HUSSAIN	521	38.91	18.14
...	spoilt ballots	16	1.19	
Majority		271	20.24	N/A
Turnout		1,339	37.31	1.60
Labour hold		Swing		

=== St. Andrew's ===
St. Andrew's – Electorate 3,295
Party	Candidate	Votes	%	±%
Conservative	Peter BRITCLIFFE (& LCC)	550	52.38	7.60
Conservative	Steven Lee SMITHSON (*)	372	35.43	N/A
Labour	Stewart Thurston EAVES	364	34.67	−19.23
Labour	Gayle Bernadette KNIGHT	312	29.71	N/A
Reform	Jake Connor ALLEN (& LCC)	80	7.62	N/A
...	spoilt ballots	6	0.57	
Majority		PB: 186	17.71	N/A
Turnout		1,050	31.87	0.69
Conservative gain from Labour		Swing		
Conservative hold		Swing		

=== St. Oswald's ===
St. Oswald's – Electorate 4,856
Party	Candidate	Votes	%	±%
Conservative	Susan HAYES	945	50.45	17.89
Labour	Glen Kevin HARRISON (& LCC)	861	45.97	6.49
Liberal Democrats	Beth WALLER-SLACK (& LCC)	53	2.83	N/A
...	spoilt ballots	14	0.75	
Majority		84	4.48	N/A
Turnout		1,873	38.57	3.26
Conservative gain from Labour		Swing		
