= 2015 Hyndburn Borough Council election =

2015 UK local government election

← 2014	7 May 2015	2016 →

12 of 35 seats to Hyndburn Borough Council 18 seats needed for a majority
	First party	Second party
Leader	Miles Parkinson	Peter Britcliffe
Party	Labour	Conservative
Leader's seat	Altham	St Andrew's
Seats before	23	8
Seats won	25	8
Seat change	▲2	Steady
	Third party	Fourth party
Leader	Paul Thompson
Party	UKIP	Independent
Leader's seat	St Oswald's
Seats before	2	2
Seats won	2	0
Seat change	Steady	▼2
- 2015 local election results in Hyndburn Labour Conservative Not contested

A by-thirds Hyndburn Borough Council local election took place on 7 May 2015. Approximately one third of the second tier council's 35 seats fell up for election, and the General Election was held on the same day.

== Background ==
Before the election Labour had a majority of 23 councillors, Conservatives had 8 councillors, while Independent (politician) had 2 councillors and UKIP had 2 councillors.

Labour, Conservative and UKIP candidates contested for every ward, Green candidates only contested for five-wards and just one Independent candidate contested in the Church-ward.

== Local Election result ==
The majority grouping of councillors was as the headline result of the election reinforced by two-seats, with independent councillors having lost their two (undefended) seats, and with no change to Conservative seats and where Ukip failed to gain any more seats:

After the election, the composition of the council was -

- Labour 24
- (Labour) Vacant 1
- Conservative 8
- UKIP 2

Hyndburn Local Election Result 2015 - electorate 48,101 (over just 12 wards) - with 62.53% turnout
Party	Seats	Gains	Losses	Net gain/loss	Seats %	Votes %	Votes	+/−
Labour	9	2	0	2	75.0	42.32	12,727	2,554
Conservative	3	0	0	0	25.0	31.98	9,618	1,686
UKIP	0	0	0	0	0	23.84	7,169	N/A
Green	0	0	0	0	0	1.16	349	N/A
Independent	0	0	2	-2	0	0.15	45	-1,594
Spoilt Ballots	...	...	...	...	0.0	0.56	168	N/A

Reference: 2011 Hyndburn Borough Council election

NB: One of the previous 23 Labour council seats, in the uncontested-Spring Hill-ward held by Councillor Pam Barton, became 'vacant' when she died on 5 May. Councillor Barton was previously elected to the Spring Hill ward in the 2014 Local Borough Council election. The subsequent by-election date for this Spring Hill council seat was set for 9 July, following the death of former Mayor Pam Barton.

The four (out of 16) Hyndburn Local Borough Council ward seats that were not up for re election in 2015 included the following wards, Netherton in Gt. Harwood, Peel and Spring Hill in Accrington, plus St. Andrews in Oswaldtwistle.

Previous Councillors who were Standing-Down in this election included - John Broadley (Lab) (Church), Nick Collingridge (Ind.) (Clayton-le-Moors), Dave Parkins (Ind.) (Huncoat) and Brian Roberts (Cons) (St. Oswalds).

== Ward by ward ==
=== Altham ===
Altham - electorate 4,107
Party	Candidate	Votes	%	±%
Labour	Miles Parkinson	1,164	47.30	−18.47
UKIP	Lee Entwistle	594	24.14	N/A
Conservative	Stacey Melling	585	23.77	−10.46
Green	John Patrick Bolam	103	4.19	N/A
...	spoilt votes	15	...	
Majority		570	23.16	N/A
Turnout		2,461	59.92	
Labour hold		Swing		

=== Barnfield ===
Barnfield - electorate 3,396
Party	Candidate	Votes	%	±%
Labour	June Lillian Mary Harrison	938	45.38	−5.6
Conservative	Jean Hurn	691	33.43	−10.4
UKIP	Walter Brown	425	20.56	N/A
...	spoilt votes	13	...	
Majority		247	11.95	N/A
Turnout		2,067	60.87	
Labour hold		Swing		

=== Baxenden ===
Baxenden - electorate 3,333
Party	Candidate	Votes	%	±%
Conservative	Kath Pratt	1,044	44.11	−13.33
Labour	David Hartley	736	31.10	−11.46
UKIP	Stewart Ian Scott	515	21.76	N/A
Green	Kerry Gormley	62	2.62	N/A
...	spoilt votes	10	...	
Majority		308	13.01	N/A
Turnout		2,367	71.02	
Conservative hold		Swing		

=== Central ===
Central - electorate 3,744
Party	Candidate	Votes	%	±%
Labour	Mohammad Ayub	1,563	65.81	−5.9
Conservative	Mohammed Saleem	516	21.73	−2.62
UKIP	Christopher Bret Matthew	224	9.43	5.49
Independent	Aqeel Afzal	45	1.89	N/A
...	spoilt votes	27	...	
Majority		1047	44.08	N/A
Turnout		2,375	63.43	
Labour hold		Swing		

=== Church ===
Church - electorate 3,505
Party	Candidate	Votes	%	±%
Labour	Loraine Ann Cox	1,029	56.17	−9.95
UKIP	Dayle Taylor	456	24.89	N/A
Conservative	Marion Raynor	338	18.45	−15.43
...	spoilt votes	9	...	
Majority		573	31.28	N/A
Turnout		1,832	52.27	
Labour hold		Swing		

=== Clayton-le-Moors ===
Clayton-le-Moors - electorate 3,683
Party	Candidate	Votes	%	±%
Labour	Melissa Margaret Fisher	951	41.73	5.7
Conservative	Stephen Brierley	776	34.05	6.36
UKIP	Liam Finbar Clark	535	23.48	N/A
...	spoilt votes	17	...	
Majority		175	7.68	N/A
Turnout		2,279	61.88	
Labour gain from Independent		Swing		

=== Huncoat ===
Huncoat - electorate 3,652
Party	Candidate	Votes	%	±%
Labour	Eamonn Higgins	933	38.99	25.03
Conservative	Nick Whittaker	809	33.81	11.41
UKIP	Janet Brown	539	22.52	N/A
Green	David Samuel Joseph Daly	106	4.43	N/A
...	spoilt votes	6	...	
Majority		124	5.18	N/A
Turnout		2,393	65.53	
Labour gain from Independent		Swing		

=== Immanuel ===
Immanuel - electorate 3,613
Party	Candidate	Votes	%	±%
Conservative	Judith Helen Addison	986	43.0	−11.57
Labour	Colette McCormack	706	30.79	−14.64
UKIP	Mark Anthony Taylor	516	22.50	N/A
Green	Simon Nicholas Woods	78	3.40	N/A
...	spoilt votes	7	...	
Majority		280	12.21	N/A
Turnout		2,293	63.47	
Conservative hold		Swing		

=== Milnshaw ===
Milnshaw - electorate 3,587
Party	Candidate	Votes	%	±%
Labour	Paul Ian Cox	1,179	53.40	8.03
Conservative	Roger Jepson	542	24.55	0.78
UKIP	John Errol Taylor	474	21.47	N/A
...	spoilt votes	13	...	
Majority		637	28.85	N/A
Turnout		2,208	61.56	
Labour hold		Swing		

=== Overton ===
Overton - electorate 5,073
Party	Candidate	Votes	%	±%
Labour	Gareth Molineux	1,132	34.22	−10.12
Conservative	Patrick McGinley	1,093	33.04	−0.17
UKIP	Ian Robinson	900	27.21	N/A
Green	Joan Elizabeth West	164	4.96	N/A
...	spoilt votes	19	...	
Majority		39	1.18	N/A
Turnout		3,308	65.21	
Labour hold		Swing		

=== Rishton ===
Rishton - electorate 5,255
Party	Candidate	Votes	%	±%
Labour	Clare Andrea Cleary	1,391	42.33	−9.95
Conservative	John Frank Bargh	971	29.55	−18.17
UKIP	David George Dowling	904	27.51	N/A
...	spoilt votes	20	...	
Majority		420	12.78	N/A
Turnout		3,286	62.53	
Labour hold		Swing		

=== St. Oswald's ===
St. Oswald's - electorate 5,153
Party	Candidate	Votes	%	±%
Conservative	Lisa Allen	1,267	37.59	−15.85
UKIP	Kenneth Edward Smith	1,087	32.25	N/A
Labour	Susan Joy Young	1,005	29.81	−16.75
...	spoilt votes	12	...	
Majority		180	5.34	N/A
Turnout		3,371	65.42	
Conservative hold		Swing		
