= 2007 Hyndburn Borough Council election =

Council election

← 2006	3 May 2007	2008 →

12 of 35 seats to Hyndburn Borough Council 18 seats needed for a majority

	First party	Second party
Leader	Peter Britcliffe	Graham Jones
Party	Conservative	Labour
Leader's seat	St Andrew's	Peel
Seats before	19	15
Seats after	18	15
Seat change	▼1	Steady
	Third party
Leader	Dave Parkins
Party	Independent
Seats before	1
Seats after	2
Seat change	▲1
- 2007 local election results in Hyndburn Labour Conservative Independent Not contested

Elections to Hyndburn Borough Council were held on 3 May 2007. One third of the council was up for election and the Conservative party stayed in overall control of the council. Labour had held one by election (Spring Hill) and won another from the Conservatives (Rishton) in Autumn 2006.

After the election, the composition of the council was

- Conservative 18
- Labour 15
- Independent 2

== Election result ==
Hyndburn local election result 2007
Party	Seats	Gains	Losses	Net gain/loss	Seats %	Votes %	Votes	+/−
Conservative	7	1	1	0	58.3	48.2	8,612	+2.9%
Labour	4	1	2	-1	33.3	46.0	8,217	-3.8%
Independent	1	1	0	+1	8.3	4.7	838	+1.1%
Green	0	0	0	0	0	1.0	183	+1.0%

The four (out of 16) Hyndburn Local Borough Council ward seats that were NOT up for re-election in 2007 included the following wards – Netherton in Gt. Harwood, Peel and Spring Hill in Accrington, plus St. Andrews in Oswaldtwistle.

== Ward results ==
Altham
Party	Candidate	Votes	%	±%
Labour	Miles Parkinson	837	62.0	+9.6
Conservative	Simon Taylor	514	38.0	−9.6
Majority		323	24.0	+19.2
Turnout		1,351	34.2	−6.0
Labour hold		Swing		

Barnfield
Party	Candidate	Votes	%	±%
Conservative	Paul Barton	768	55.9	+16.0
Labour	Roy Hyland	422	30.7	+5.2
Green	Kerry Gormley	183	13.3	−21.3
Majority		346	25.2	+19.9
Turnout		1,373	40.9	−8.2
Conservative hold		Swing		

Baxenden
Party	Candidate	Votes	%	±%
Conservative	Kathleen Pratt	891	72.6	+19.6
Labour	Viv Preston	336	27.4	+3.9
Majority		555	45.2	+15.7
Turnout		1,227	38.0	−10.2
Conservative hold		Swing		

Central
Party	Candidate	Votes	%	±%
Labour	Mohammad Ayub	945	57.4	+11.2
Conservative	Mohammed Siddique	700	42.6	−11.2
Majority		245	14.8	+7.2
Turnout		1,645	48.5	−7.6
Labour gain from Conservative		Swing		

Church
Party	Candidate	Votes	%	±%
Labour	John Broadley	740	61.9	+13.9
Conservative	Mohammed Safdar	456	38.1	+5.4
Majority		284	23.8	+8.5
Turnout		1,196	36.5	−4.2
Labour hold		Swing		

Clayton-le-Moors
Party	Candidate	Votes	%	±%
Conservative	Janet Storey	666	53.3	+26.6
Labour	Paula Landers	583	46.7	+13.5
Majority		83	6.6	
Turnout		1,249	35.6	−4.0
Conservative hold		Swing		

Huncoat
Party	Candidate	Votes	%	±%
Independent	David Parkins	838	53.8	+53.8
Labour	Brendan Shiel	444	28.5	−25.6
Conservative	Anne Wells	276	17.7	−28.2
Majority		394	25.3	
Turnout		1,558	45.1	−11.8
Independent gain from Labour		Swing		

Immanuel
Party	Candidate	Votes	%	±%
Conservative	Jean Lockwood	724	52.2	+3.4
Labour	John McCormack	662	47.8	−3.4
Majority		62	4.4	
Turnout		1,386	39.5	+2.6
Conservative hold		Swing		

Milnshaw
Party	Candidate	Votes	%	±%
Labour	Malcolm Pritchard	900	65.2	+8.4
Conservative	Dennis Baron	480	34.8	−8.4
Majority		420	30.4	+16.8
Turnout		1,380	39.2	+2.1
Labour hold		Swing		

Overton
Party	Candidate	Votes	%	±%
Conservative	David Mason	978	57.6	+3.8
Labour	Rob Kearney	719	42.4	−3.8
Majority		259	15.2	+7.6
Turnout		1,697	34.5	−1.5
Conservative hold		Swing		

Rishton
Party	Candidate	Votes	%	±%
Conservative	Stanley Horne	1,078	52.1	+0.9
Labour	Winifred Jackson	990	47.9	−0.9
Majority		88	4.2	+1.8
Turnout		2,068	41.5	+1.8
Conservative gain from Labour		Swing		

St Oswald's
Party	Candidate	Votes	%	±%
Conservative	Brian Roberts	1,081	62.8	+3.5
Labour	Bill Pinder	639	37.2	−3.5
Majority		442	25.6	+7.0
Turnout		1,720	33.8	+0.5
Conservative hold		Swing		
