= 1976 Hyndburn Borough Council election =

1976 UK local government election

The 1976 Hyndburn Borough Council election for the Hyndburn Borough Council was held in May 1976.

== Results ==
Hyndburn local election result 1976
Party	Seats	Gains	Losses	Net gain/loss	Seats %	Votes %	Votes	+/−
Labour	14		10		29.2%	29.77%		
Conservative	33	12			68.8%	60.24%		
Liberal	1		2		2.1%	6.92%		
National Front						1.47%		
Independent						1.31%		
Communist						0.29%		

=== By ward ===
... * denotes sitting councillor defeated

Accrington West (2 seats - electorate 2518)
Party	Candidate	Votes	%	±%
Labour	Phyllis Hargreaves	687		
Labour	Basil Whitham	519		
Conservative	George Granville Broadhurst	407		
Conservative	Richard Harwood	270		
...	spoilt votes	5	...	
Majority		280		
Majority		112		
Turnout		1,057		
Labour hold		Swing		
Labour hold		Swing		

Accrington Central (1 seat- electorate 1454)
Party	Candidate	Votes	%	±%
Labour	Wallace Haines	367		
Conservative	Mary Mortimer	263		
...	spoilt votes	5	...	
Majority		104		
Turnout		630		
Labour hold		Swing		

Accrington North (4 seats - electorate 5426)
Party	Candidate	Votes	%	±%
Conservative	Sarah Josephine Pratt	1,290		
Conservative	Jessie Hughes	1,192		
Conservative	Raymond Duckworth	1,103		
Conservative	Herbert Taylor	1,093		
Liberal	Fredrick Maurice Ellison	596		
Liberal	Aldan Unwin	555		
National Front	Kenneth Ian Dobson	436		
...	spoilt votes	19	...	
Majority		694		
Majority		596		
Majority		507		
Majority		497		
Turnout		1,959		
Conservative gain from Liberal		Swing		
Conservative hold		Swing		
Conservative hold		Swing		
Conservative hold		Swing		

Accrington Peel Park (2 seats - electorate 2907)
Party	Candidate	Votes	%	±%
Conservative	Alice Owens	595		
Labour	Gerald David Smith	489		
Conservative	'Peter Vincent Favell	478		
Labour	Robert Eddleston	422		
National Front	David Andrew Riley	245		
Independent	Robert Rigg	192		
...	spoilt votes	8	...	
Majority		117		
Majority		11		
Turnout		1,301		
Conservative hold		Swing		
Labour hold		Swing		

Accrington East (2 seats electorate 2068)
Party	Candidate	Votes	%	±%
Conservative	William Parkinson	485		
Conservative	Alan Benson	473		
Labour	Ann Elizabeth Sudders *	438		
...	spoilt votes	0	...	
Majority		47		
Majority		35		
Turnout		862		
Conservative hold		Swing		
Conservative gain from Labour		Swing		

Accrington South (3 seats electorate 4,532)
Party	Candidate	Votes	%	±%
Liberal	Kenneth John Marsden	861		
Conservative	Velma Rennison	791		
Conservative	Brian Fairley	785		
Liberal	Margaret Martin	772		
Liberal	Alan Dinwoodle Lund *	678		
Liberal	Alan Thomas Leeming	594		
National Front	Dave Cronshaw	373		
...	spoilt votes	11	...	
Majority		89		
Majority		19		
Majority		13		
Turnout		1,837		
Liberal hold		Swing		
Conservative hold		Swing		
Conservative gain from Liberal		Swing		

Higher Antley (2 seats electorate 2,200)
Party	Candidate	Votes	%	±%
Conservative	Mary-Lou Cleak	509		
Labour	Kenneth Curtis	492		
Conservative	Patricia Harwood	464		
Labour	Dave Walter Keeley	427		
...	spoilt votes	8	...	
Majority		45		
Majority		28		
Turnout		994		
Labour hold		Swing		
Conservative gain from Labour		Swing		

Spring Hill (4 seats electorate 4,464)
Party	Candidate	Votes	%	±%
Labour	Christopher Dillon	923		
Labour	John Pickup	918		
Labour	Thomas Bramley	777		
Conservative	Elizabeth Court	774		
Labour	Clifford Westell *	763		
Conservative	Alfred Jameson	683		
Liberal	Henry Batty	556		
Liberal	David O'Hanlon	549		
...	spoilt votes	6	...	
Majority		160		
Majority		155		
Majority		14		
Majority		11		
Turnout		1,935		
Labour hold		Swing		
Labour hold		Swing		
Labour hold		Swing		
Conservative gain from Labour		Swing		

Huncoat

Huncoat (2 seats electorate 1,965)
Party	Candidate	Votes	%	±%
Labour	Doris Grant	525		
Labour	Walter Farrimond	475		
Conservative	Douglas John Deakin	449		
Conservative	Joseph Anthony Hindley	448		
...	spoilt votes	1	...	
Majority		76		
Majority		26		
Turnout		1.005		
Labour hold		Swing		
Labour hold		Swing		

Church

Church St. James (1 seat electorate 1,039)
Party	Candidate	Votes	%	±%
Labour	Leonard Dickinson	270		
Conservative	Raymond Prestage	146		
...	spoilt votes	3	...	
Majority		124		
Turnout		416		
Labour hold		Swing		

Church Chapel & Elmfield (1 seat electorate ??)
Party	Candidate	Votes	%	±%
Labour	Jack Grime	Uncontested		
Labour hold		Swing		

Church Dill Hall (1 seat electorate 1,235)
Party	Candidate	Votes	%	±%
Conservative	John Riley	423		
Labour	Christina Rogan	213		
Liberal	Harold Stuttard	64		
...	spoilt votes	1	...	
Majority		124	30.0%	
Turnout		700		
Conservative gain from Labour		Swing		

Clayton-Le-Moors

Clayton-Le-Moors & Altham (4 seats electorate 5,506)
Party	Candidate	Votes	%	±%
Conservative	Elizabeth Hoyle	1,789		
Conservative	Philip Gilbraith	1,737		
Conservative	Jennie Jackson	1,606		
Conservative	John Clifton Downing	1,583		
Labour	Arthur Lewis	894		
Labour	Margaret Muriel Sims	851		
...	spoilt votes	6	...	
Majority		895		
Majority		843		
Majority		712		
Majority		689		
Turnout		2,580		
Conservative hold		Swing		
Conservative hold		Swing		
Conservative hold		Swing		
Conservative hold		Swing		

Great Harwood

Great Harwood North & West (4 seats electorate 4,418)
Party	Candidate	Votes	%	±%
Conservative	Jessie Marie Hall	1,406		
Conservative	William Birch Sumner	1,338		
Conservative	Keith Owen	1,284		
Conservative	Terrence Owen	1,220		
Labour	Thomas Lambert	829		
Labour	James Hocking	793		
Labour	Francis Livesey	750		
Labour	Jean Ann Sunner	682		
...	spoilt votes	6	...	
Majority		577		
Majority		509		
Majority		455		
Majority		391		
Turnout				
Conservative hold		Swing		
Conservative hold		Swing		
Conservative hold		Swing		
Conservative hold		Swing		

Great Harwood East & South (3 seats electorate 3,892)
Party	Candidate	Votes	%	±%
Conservative	Wyn Frankland	915		
Conservative	Angela Margaret Hanson	912		
Labour	George Slynn	879		
Conservative	Maurice Kezler	872		
Labour	Joseph Hayhurst *	840		
Labour	Anthony Tattersall *	779		
...	spoilt votes	8	...	
Majority		43		
Majority		40		
Majority		7		
Turnout		1,930		
Conservative gain from Labour		Swing		
Conservative gain from Labour		Swing		
Labour hold		Swing		

Oswaldtwistle

Oswaldtwistle St Michael's & St Paul's (4 seats electorate 5,305)
Party	Candidate	Votes	%	±%
Conservative	William Finch	1,228		
Conservative	Monica Margaret Browning	1,206		
Conservative	Doris Clegg	1,173		
Conservative	Thomas Leslie Rushton	1,134		
Labour	Alfred Newsham *	958		
Independent	Clifford Walsh	745		
Liberal	Ian Raymond Thorpe	504		
...	spoilt votes	9	...	
Majority		270		
Majority		248		
Majority		215		
Majority		176		
Turnout		=2,324		
Conservative hold		Swing		
Conservative hold		Swing		
Conservative hold		Swing		
Conservative gain from Labour		Swing		

Oswaldtwistle Foxhill Bank & St Oswalds (4 seats electorate 5,634)
Party	Candidate	Votes	%	±%
Conservative	Joseph Kenneth Hargreaves	1,330		
Conservative	Bessie Margaret Sandiford	1,263		
Conservative	Edward Francis Hill	1,234		
Conservative	Thomas Wilfred Renshaw	1,187		
Labour	John Malcolm Farmer	808		
Communist	Thomas Marshall	205		
...	spoilt votes	6	...	
Majority		522		
Majority		455		
Majority		426		
Majority		379		
Turnout		2,127		
Conservative hold		Swing		
Conservative hold		Swing		
Conservative hold		Swing		
Conservative gain from Labour		Swing		

Rishton

Rishton (4 seats electorate 4,597)
Party	Candidate	Votes	%	±%
Conservative	Donald John McNeil	1,362		
Labour	Allan Critchlow	1,323		
Conservative	Edward Edmondson	1,146		
Conservative	Peter John Rushton	1,171		
Conservative	Anthony William Davies	1,058		
Labour	Fredrick Beck Parkinson *	855		
Labour	Robert Harry Peel	748		
Labour	John James Palmer	632		
...	spoilt votes	9	...	
Majority		304		
Majority		265		
Majority		88		
Majority		113		
Turnout		2,362		
Conservative hold		Swing		
Labour hold		Swing		
Conservative hold		Swing		
Conservative gain from Labour		Swing		
