= 2018 Hyndburn Borough Council election =

2018 UK local government election

← 2016	3 May 2018	2019 →

11 of 35 seats to Hyndburn Borough Council 18 seats needed for a majority
	First party	Second party	Third party
Leader	Miles Parkinson	Tony Dobson	Paul Thompson
Party	Labour	Conservative	UKIP
Leader's seat	Altham	Barnfield	St Oswald's
Seats before	26	7	2
Seats won	26	9	0
Seat change	Steady	▲2	▼2
- 2018 local election results in Hyndburn Labour Conservative Not contested

A by-thirds Hyndburn Borough Council local election, was held on Thursday 3 May 2018. Approximately one third of the local council's 35 seats fell up for election on that day.

== Background ==
Before the election Labour had a majority of 26 councillors, Conservatives had 7 councillors, while UKIP 'formerly' had 2 councillors, who have since resigned from that party and had both reverted to become Independents and where one of those seats had been left Vacated, following the death of that councillor.

== Council composition ==
Prior to the election the composition of the council was:

- Labour 26
- Conservative 7
- Independent 1
- Vacant 1

Both Labour and Conservatives candidates challenged every ward, with Labour defending 7 existing seats, and Conservatives defending only 2 existing seats.

No candidates stood as potential UKIP councillors, in any Hyndburn ward, but as Independents instead, across only 5 wards.

Only one candidate stood as a potential Green Party councillor, in Great Harwood's Overton ward.

== Local election result ==
The majority grouping of councillors was as the headline result of the election, unchanged with Labour retaining an overall 26-seat majority, but with Conservatives increasing their numbers by 2 seats, as UKIP lost their 2-seats.

After the election, the composition of the council's 35 seats was -

- Labour 26
- Conservative 9

Hyndburn local election result 2018 - electorate 41,980 (over just 11 wards) - with 33.74% turnout
Party	Seats	Gains	Losses	Net gain/loss	Seats %	Votes %	Votes	+/−
Labour	7	1	-1	0	63.64%	52.87%	7,488	+794
Conservative	4	2	-0	2	36.36%	36.89%	5,225	+1,028
Independent	0	0	0	0	0%	8.69%	1,231	+748
Green	0	0	0	0	0%	0.99%	140	-87
UKIP	0	0	-2	-2	0%	0%	0	-4,990
Spoilt Ballots	0	0	0	0	0%	-	78	-66

NB: Five (of the 16) Council wards, where seats were NOT up for re-election in 2018, included the following wards - Altham, Baxenden and Church, plus Barnfield and Central in Accrington.

The St Oswalds ward seat, formerly held by UKIP Councillor Paul Thompson since 2014, and following his Death in October 2017, was left vacated without a by election called.

Previous Councillors who were Standing-Down in this election included - Bernard Dawson (Lab) (Huncoat), Julie Livesey (Con) (Immanuel) and Peter Britcliffe (Con) (St. Andrew’s).

== Ward results ==
=== Clayton-le-Moors ===
Clayton-le-Moors - electorate 3,555
Party	Candidate	Votes	%	±%
Labour	Timothy Aidan O'KANE	463	42.67	7.34
Conservative	Kelly Amanda PRINCE	361	33.27	5.61
Independent	Nick COLLINGRIDGE	255	23.50	11.95
...	spoilt votes	6	0.55	
Majority		102	9.40	N/A
Turnout		1,085	30.52	−5.37
Labour hold		Swing		

=== Huncoat ===
Huncoat - electorate 3,606
Party	Candidate	Votes	%	±%
Labour	David PARKINS	879	65.01	30.47
Independent	Nick WHITTAKER	316	23.37	N/A
Conservative	Aqeel AFZAL	156	11.54	−18.10
...	spoilt votes	1	0.07	
Majority		563	41.64	N/A
Turnout		1,352	37.49	1.27
Labour hold		Swing		

=== Immanuel ===
Immanuel - electorate 3,457
Party	Candidate	Votes	%	±%
Conservative	Josh Blayne ALLEN	746	62.90	25.27
Labour	Shahed MAHMOOD	426	35.92	0.91
...	spoilt votes	14	1.18	
Majority		320	26.98	N/A
Turnout		1,186	34.31	−4.17
Conservative hold		Swing		

=== Milnshaw ===
Milnshaw - electorate 3,100
Party	Candidate	Votes	%	±%
Labour	Andrew Steven CLEGG	650	52.29	8.92
Independent	Malcolm Eric PRITCHARD	368	29.61	−22.01
Conservative	Robyn Maisie-Jade BRADSHAW	222	17.86	N/A
...	spoilt votes	3	0.24	
Majority		282	22.69	N/A
Turnout		1,243	40.10	1.78
Labour gain from Independent		Swing		

=== Netherton ===
Netherton - electorate 3,247
Party	Candidate	Votes	%	±%
Labour	Bernadette PARKINSON	780	64.14	12.67
Conservative	Liz McGINLEY	425	34.95	23.83
...	spoilt votes	11	0.90	
Majority		355	29.19	N/A
Turnout		1,216	37.45	−5.32
Labour hold		Swing		

=== Overton ===
Overton - electorate 4,960
Party	Candidate	Votes	%	±%
Labour	Jennifer Claire MOLINEUX	839	46.46	9.96
Conservative	Patrick John Luke McGINLEY	819	45.35	23.16
Green	Joan Elizabeth WEST	140	7.75	2.75
...	spoilt votes	8	0.44	
Majority		20	1.11	N/A
Turnout		1,806	36.41	−2.83
Labour hold		Swing		

=== Peel ===
Peel - electorate 3,064
Party	Candidate	Votes	%	±%
Labour	Joyce Nicholson PLUMMER	580	69.21	8.40
Independent	John Brian BARON	137	16.35	10.25
Conservative	Jean HURN	119	14.20	N/A
...	spoilt votes	2	0.24	
Majority		443	52.86	N/A
Turnout		838	27.35	−1.97
Labour hold		Swing		

=== Rishton ===
Rishton - electorate 5,065
Party	Candidate	Votes	%	±%
Conservative	Michael MILLER	744	52.03	30.69
Labour	Ken James MOSS	674	47.13	0.84
...	spoilt votes	12	0.84	
Majority		70	4.90	N/A
Turnout		1,430	28.23	−10.20
Conservative gain from Labour		Swing		

=== Spring Hill ===
Spring Hill - electorate 3,575
Party	Candidate	Votes	%	±%
Labour	Diane FIELDING	770	82.35	32.69
Conservative	Jake Conor ALLEN	155	16.58	−17.46
...	spoilt votes	10	1.07	
Majority		615	65.78	N/A
Turnout		935	26.15	−21.96
Labour hold		Swing		

=== St. Andrew's ===
St. Andrew's - electorate 3,360
Party	Candidate	Votes	%	±%
Conservative	Sara Alice BRITCLIFFE	647	51.11	2.47
Labour	Christopher James KNIGHT	613	48.42	20.71
...	spoilt votes	6	0.47	
Majority		34	2.69	N/A
Turnout		1,266	37.68	−0.47
Conservative hold		Swing		

=== St Oswald's ===
St Oswald's - electorate 4,991
Party	Candidate	Votes	%	±%
Conservative	Marlene Heather HAWORTH	831	46.04	13.10
Labour	Gayle Bernadette KNIGHT	814	45.10	18.23
Independent	Paul BROWN	155	8.59	N/A
...	spoilt votes	5	0.28	
Majority		17	0.94	N/A
Turnout		1,805	36.17	−2.70
Conservative gain from UKIP		Swing		
