= 2010 Hyndburn Borough Council election =

2010 UK local government election

- 6 May 2010

11 of 35 seats to Hyndburn Borough Council 18 seats needed for a majority

	First party	Second party
Leader	Peter Britcliffe	Graham Jones
Party	Conservative	Labour
Leader's seat	St Andrew's	Peel
Seats before	21	13
Seats after	18	15
Seat change	▼3	▲2
	Third party
Leader	Ian Robinson
Party	Independent
Seats before	1
Seats after	2
Seat change	▲1
- 2010 local election results in Hyndburn Labour Conservative Independent Not contested

Elections to Hyndburn Borough Council were held on 6 May 2010. One third of the council was up for election. Since there was also the General Election being held on the same day, overall voter turnout was much higher than usual, for such local elections.

== Background ==
Before the election Conservatives had a majority of 21 councillors, Labour had 13 councillors, while Independent (politician) had 1 councillor.

Conservative candidates contested every ward, Labour candidates contested all wards except Overton-ward. Independents contested seven-wards, not including their one-existing uncontested-seat. LibDem's only single candidate contested in the Spring Hill-ward. BNP's only single candidate contested in the Clayton-le-Moors-ward.

== Local Election result ==
After the election, the composition of the council was -

- Conservative 18
- Labour 15
- Independent 2

Hyndburn local election result 2010 - over just 11 wards
Party	Seats	Gains	Losses	Net gain/loss	Seats %	Votes %	Votes	+/−
Labour	7	3	1	+2	63.6	41.2	11,047	+0.4
Conservative	3	1	4	-3	27.3	39.8	10,579	+9.7
Independent	1	1	0	+1	9.1	16.8	4,480	+14.0
Liberal Democrats	0	0	0	0	...	...	281	
BNP	0	0	0	0	...	...	192	
Turnout		26,579						

Reference: 2006 Hyndburn Borough Council election#Local Election result

NB: Five (of the 16) Council ward seats that were NOT up for re-election in 2010 included the following wards - Altham, Baxenden and Church, plus Barnfield and Central in Accrington.

== Ward results ==
=== Clayton-le-Moors ===
Clayton-le-Moors
Party	Candidate	Votes	%	±%
Labour	Tim O'Kane	800	33.77	
Conservative	Jennie Anderson	722	30.48	
Independent	Nick Collingridge	655	27.65	
BNP	Andrew Eccles	192	8.10	
Turnout		2,369	67.2	
Labour gain from Independent		Swing		

=== Huncoat ===
Huncoat
Party	Candidate	Votes	%	±%
Conservative	Nick Whittaker	797	35.50	
Labour	Martyn Isherwood	779	34.70	
Independent	Paul Gott	669	29.80	
Turnout		2,245	65.5	
Conservative gain from Labour		Swing		

=== Immanuel ===
Immanuel
Party	Candidate	Votes	%	±%
Labour Co-op	Colette McCormack	1163	50.46	
Conservative	Simon James Taylor	1142	49.54	
Turnout		2,305	67.5	
Labour hold		Swing		

=== Milnshaw ===
Milnshaw
Party	Candidate	Votes	%	±%
Labour	Clare Pritchard	1230	57.40	
Conservative	Roger Jepson	913	42.60	
Turnout		2,143	64.8	
Labour hold		Swing		

=== Netherton ===
Netherton
Party	Candidate	Votes	%	±%
Labour Co-op	Ciaran Wells	1137	56.18	
Conservative	Dennis Baron	540	26.68	
Independent	Stephen Aspin	347	17.14	
Turnout		2,024	65.9	
Labour hold		Swing		

=== Overton ===
Overton
Party	Candidate	Votes	%	±%
Independent	Ian Robinson	1614	51.78	
Conservative	Roy Atkinson	1503	48.22	
Turnout		3,117	67.0	
Independent gain from Conservative		Swing		

=== Peel ===
Peel
Party	Candidate	Votes	%	±%
Labour	Bernard Dawson	1168	71.31	
Conservative	Danny Cassidy	470	28.69	
Turnout		1,638	56.0	
Labour hold		Swing		

=== Rishton ===
Rishton
Party	Candidate	Votes	%	±%
Labour	Ken Moss	1,535	46.53	
Conservative	Ross Sourbutts	1384	41.95	
Independent	Chris Fisher	380	11.52	
Turnout		3,299	68.3	
Labour gain from Conservative		Swing		

=== Spring Hill ===
Spring Hill
Party	Candidate	Votes	%	±%
Labour	Pam Barton	1291	63.94	
Conservative	Mohammed Safdar	447	22.14	
Liberal Democrats	Akhtar Hussain	281	13.92	
Turnout		2,019	59.1	
Labour hold		Swing		

=== St. Andrew's ===
St. Andrew's
Party	Candidate	Votes	%	±%
Conservative	Peter Britcliffe	1060	51.78	
Labour Co-op	John McCormack	744	36.35	
Independent	Tony Hindley	243	11.87	
Turnout		2,047	63.4	
Conservative hold		Swing		

=== St. Oswald's ===
St. Oswald's
Party	Candidate	Votes	%	±%
Conservative	Doug Hayes	1584	47.20	
Labour	Stewart Eaves	1200	35.76	
Independent	Brian Andrew Smith	572	17.04	
Turnout		3,356	66.6	
Conservative hold		Swing		
