= 2000 Hyndburn Borough Council election =

2000 UK local government election

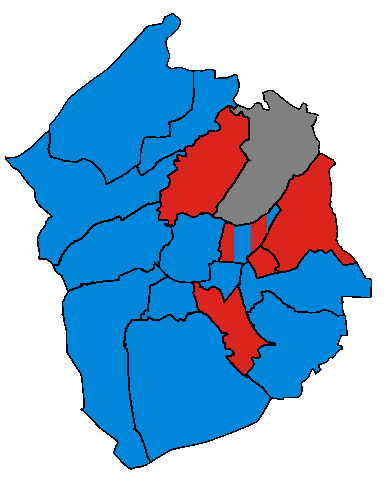
2000 local election results in Hyndburn. Blue is for wards won by the Conservatives. Red is for wards won by Labour. Grey is for wards that were not contested at this election.

Elections to Hyndburn Borough Council were held on 4 May 2000. One third of the council was up for election and the Conservative party gained overall control of the council from no overall control.

After the election, the composition of the council was

- Conservative 31
- Labour 15
- Independent 1

== Election result ==
Hyndburn local election result 2000
Party	Seats	Gains	Losses	Net gain/loss	Seats %	Votes %	Votes	+/−
Conservative	31			+8	72.2			
Labour	15			-8	27.8			
Independent	1							

== Ward results ==
Barnfield
Party	Candidate	Votes	%	±%
Conservative	Tony Dobson	394		
Labour	Brenda Haworth	354		
Majority		40		
Turnout		748	26.6%	
Conservative gain from Labour		Swing		

Baxenden
Party	Candidate	Votes	%	±%
Conservative	Jim Dickenson	1008		
Labour	Denis Baron	276		
Majority		732		
Turnout		1284	32.5	
Conservative hold		Swing		

Central
Party	Candidate	Votes	%	±%
Conservative	Mohammed Kazi	890		
Labour	Richard Ellis Heap	400		
Majority		490		
Turnout		1290	32.5	
Conservative gain from Labour		Swing		

Church
Party	Candidate	Votes	%	±%
Conservative	Eddie Hogan	721		
Labour	Jack Grime	610		
Majority		111		
Turnout		1331	32.5	
Conservative gain from Labour		Swing		

Clayton-Le-Moors
Party	Candidate	Votes	%	±%
Labour	Timothy O'Kane	758		
Conservative	Shirley Davies	756		
Majority		2		
Turnout		1514	30.8	
Labour hold		Swing		

Eachill, Rishton
Party	Candidate	Votes	%	±%
Conservative	Anne Scaife	416		
Labour	Lesley Jackson	329		
Majority		87		
Turnout		745	29.6	
Conservative gain from Labour		Swing		

Huncoat
Party	Candidate	Votes	%	±%
Labour	Stephen Walsh	528		
Conservative	Peter Cottam	504		
Majority		24		
Turnout		1032	31.4	
Labour hold		Swing		

Immanuel (2)
Party	Candidate	Votes	%	±%
Conservative	Maureen Duffy	697		
Conservative	Jean Lockwood	668		
Labour	Len Neil	518		
Labour	Harold Tootle	494		
Majority		203		
Majority		150		
Turnout		1184	34.1	
Conservative hold		Swing		
Conservative gain from Labour		Swing		

Milnshaw
Party	Candidate	Votes	%	±%
Labour	Ian Ormerod	732		
Conservative	Gordon Mills	685		
Conservative	Joan Pilkington	664		
Labour	Geoffrey Sargison	638		
Independent	M Pritchard	234		
Majority		94		
Majority		21		
Turnout		1477	41.2	
Labour hold		Swing		
Conservative gain from Labour		Swing		

Netherton
Party	Candidate	Votes	%	±%
Conservative	Roy Atkinson	571		
Labour	David Forshaw	505		
Majority		66		
Turnout		1076	30.4	
Conservative gain from Labour		Swing		

Norden
Party	Candidate	Votes	%	±%
Conservative	Stan Horne	505		
Labour	Francis Molloy	261		
Majority		246		
Turnout		766	30.3	
Conservative hold		Swing		

Overton
Party	Candidate	Votes	%	±%
Conservative	David Mason	790		
Labour	Dr Mohammed Rahman	745		
Majority		45		
Turnout		1,535	33.6	
Conservative gain from Labour		Swing		

Peel
Party	Candidate	Votes	%	±%
Labour	Bernard Dawson	477		
Conservative	Derek Wolstenholme	296		
Majority		181		
Turnout		773	23.7	
Labour hold		Swing		

Spring Hill
Party	Candidate	Votes	%	±%
Labour	Clifford Westell	613		
Conservative	Allah Dad	491		
Majority		122		
Turnout		1,104	31.2	
Labour hold		Swing		

St Andrew's
Party	Candidate	Votes	%	±%
Conservative	Peter Britcliffe	943		
Labour	Maurice Cowell	451		
Majority		492		
Turnout		1,394	42.6	
Conservative hold		Swing		

St Oswald's
Party	Candidate	Votes	%	±%
Conservative	Brian Roberts	894		
Labour	Margaret Cowell	454		
Majority		440		
Turnout		1,348	27.7	
Conservative gain from Labour		Swing		
