= 1980 Hyndburn Borough Council election =

Borough Council election

Elections to Hyndburn Borough Council were held in May 1980. 1980 was the second year of local elections on the new boundaries. One third of the council was up for election and the Conservative party lost overall control of the council. Labour taking 8 seats from the Conservatives.

After the election, the composition of the council was

- Conservative (28−8=20)
- Labour (19+8=27)

Hyndburn local election result 1980
Party	Seats	Gains	Losses	Net gain/loss	Seats %	Votes %	Votes	+/−
Labour	13	8			81.3%	51.8%	12,944	+5.2%
Conservative	3		8		18.7%	38.9%	9,713	−10.2%
Liberal						5.0%	1,239	+2.6%
National Front								−0.5%
Independent						4.0%	992	+3.0%
Communist								−0.1%
Spoilt						0.4%	96	0
Totals	16					42.9%	24,984	

Ward	1979 1st	1979 2nd	1979 3rd	1980
Next Up	1980	1982	1983	1984
Altham Parish	—	—	Con	
Barnfield	Con	Lab	Lab	Lab
Baxenden	Con	Con	Con	Lab
Central	Lab	Lab	Lab	Lab
Church	Lab	Lab	Lab	Lab
Clayton	Con	Con	Con	Lab
Huncoat	Con	Lab	Con	Lab
Immanuel	Lab	Con	Con	Lab
Milnshaw	Con	Con	Con	Lab
Netherton	Lab	Lab	Lab	Lab
Overton	Con	Con	Con	Lab
Peel	Lab	Lab	Con	Lab
Rishton Eachill	Con	—	Con	Con
Rishton Norden	Con	Lab	—	Con
Spring Hill	Lab	Lab	Lab	Lab
St Andrews	Con	Con	Con	Lab
St Oswalds	Con	Con	Con	Con
Councillors
Labour Cllrs.	5	8	6	13
Cons Cllrs	11	7	10	3
% of the Vote
Labour	46.6%			51.8%
Conservatives	55.0%			38.9%

== Ward results ==
Barnfield- electorate 3,017
Party	Candidate	Votes	%	±%
Labour	Les Jones	783		
Conservative		464		
...	spoilt votes	3	...	
Majority				
Turnout		1,250	41.4%	
Labour gain from Conservative		Swing		

Baxenden- electorate 3,539
Party	Candidate	Votes	%	±%
Labour	Robert Eddleston	596		
Liberal		576		
Conservative		543		
...	spoilt votes	3	...	
Majority				
Turnout			48.5%	
Labour gain from Conservative		Swing		

Central- electorate 3,950
Party	Candidate	Votes	%	±%
Labour	Basil Whitham	1,119		
Conservative		417		
...	spoilt votes	11	...	
Majority				
Turnout			39.2%	
Labour hold		Swing		

Church- electorate 4,843
Party	Candidate	Votes	%	±%
Labour	Phyliss Hargreaves	1,429		
Conservative		658		
...	spoilt votes	5	...	
Majority				
Turnout			43.2%	
Labour hold		Swing		

Clayton-le-Moors – electorate 4,180
Party	Candidate	Votes	%	±%
Labour	PS Whitham	838		
Conservative		828		
Liberal		331		
...	spoilt votes	8	...	
Majority				
Turnout			48.0%	
Labour gain from Conservative		Swing		

Huncoat – electorate 2,764
Party	Candidate	Votes	%	±%
Labour	Eddie Saville	696		
Conservative		694		
...	spoilt votes	1	...	
Majority		2		
Turnout			50.3%	
Labour gain from Conservative		Swing		

Immanuel – electorate 3,369
Party	Candidate	Votes	%	±%
Labour	B Nuttall	704		
Conservative		658		
...	spoilt votes	2	...	
Majority		46		
Turnout			38.2%	
Labour hold		Swing		

Milnshaw – electorate 4,188
Party	Candidate	Votes	%	±%
Labour	Graham A. Ashworth	1,044		
Conservative		813		
...	spoilt votes	2	...	
Majority				
Turnout			44.4%	
Labour gain from Conservative		Swing		

Netherton – electorate 3,714
Party	Candidate	Votes	%	±%
Labour	F Gregory	1,058		
Conservative		722		
...	spoilt votes	5	...	
Majority				
Turnout			48.1%	
Labour hold		Swing		

Overton – electorate 4,518
Party	Candidate	Votes	%	±%
Labour	J D Marsh	910		
Conservative		897		
...	spoilt votes	2	...	
Majority				
Turnout			40.0%	
Labour gain from Conservative		Swing		

Peel – electorate 3,861
Party	Candidate	Votes	%	±%
Labour	W Wallwork	1,111		
Conservative		603		
...	spoilt votes	5	...	
Majority				
Turnout			44.5%	
Labour gain from Conservative		Swing		

Rishton Eachill – electorate 2,102
Party	Candidate	Votes	%	±%
Conservative	G. D. Henry	482		
Labour		350		
Liberal		197		
...	spoilt votes	1	...	
Majority				
Turnout			49.0%	
Conservative hold		Swing		

Rishton Norden- electorate 2,538
Party	Candidate	Votes	%	±%
Conservative		652		
Labour		379		
Liberal		135		
...	spoilt votes	0	...	
Majority				
Turnout			45.9%	
Conservative hold		Swing		

Spring Hill – electorate 4,120
Party	Candidate	Votes	%	±%
Labour	Cliff Westell	776		
Independent		690		
...	spoilt votes	42	...	
Majority				
Turnout			36.6%	
Labour hold		Swing		

St. Andrew's – electorate 3,238
Party	Candidate	Votes	%	±%
Labour	Alfred Newsham	642		
Conservative		626		
...	spoilt votes	3	...	
Majority		16		
Turnout			39.3%	
Labour gain from Conservative		Swing		

St Oswald's – electorate 4,079
Party	Candidate	Votes	%	±%
Conservative	Bessie Margaret Sandiford	656		
Labour		509		
Independent		302		
...	spoilt votes	3	...	
Majority				
Turnout			36.0%	
Conservative hold		Swing		
