= 2003 Hyndburn Borough Council election =

2003 UK local government election

- 1 May 2003

12 of 35 seats to Hyndburn Borough Council 18 seats needed for a majority
	First party	Second party
Leader	Peter Britcliffe	Jean Battle
Party	Conservative	Labour
Leader's seat	St Andrew's	Church
Seats before	17	18
Seats won	18	17
Seat change	▲1	▼1
- 2003 local election results in Hyndburn Labour Conservative Not contested

Elections to Hyndburn Borough Council were held on 1 May 2003. One third of the council was up for election and the Conservative party gained overall control of the council from the Labour party. Overall turnout was 51.5%.

After the election, the composition of the council was

- Conservative 18
- Labour 17

== Election result ==
Hyndburn local election result 2003
Party	Seats	Gains	Losses	Net gain/loss	Seats %	Votes %	Votes	+/−
Conservative	7	2	1	+1	58.3	50.5	11,774	+1.1%
Labour	5	1	2	-1	41.7	47.1	10,981	-2.6%
Green	0	0	0	0	0	2.3	545	+2.3%

== Ward results ==
Altham
Party	Candidate	Votes	%	±%
Labour	Miles Parkinson	948	56.1	
Conservative	Michael Taylor	743	43.9	
Majority		205	12.2	
Turnout		1,691		
Labour hold		Swing		

Barnfield
Party	Candidate	Votes	%	±%
Conservative	Paul Barton	623	35.2	
Labour	Wendy Dwyer	601	34.0	
Green	Ian Dixon	545	30.8	
Majority		22	1.2	
Turnout		1,769		
Conservative gain from Labour		Swing		

Baxenden
Party	Candidate	Votes	%	±%
Conservative	James Dickinson	1,235	70.2	
Labour	William Whittaker	524	29.8	
Majority		711	40.4	
Turnout		1,759		
Conservative hold		Swing		

Central
Party	Candidate	Votes	%	±%
Conservative	Siddique Kazi	1,137	62.0	
Labour	Richard Heap	697	38.0	
Majority		440	24.0	
Turnout		1,834		
Conservative hold		Swing		

Church
Party	Candidate	Votes	%	±%
Labour	John Broadley	973	58.0	
Conservative	Edmund Hogan	706	42.0	
Majority		267	16.0	
Turnout		1,679		
Labour hold		Swing		

Clayton-le-Moors
Party	Candidate	Votes	%	±%
Conservative	Janet Storey	953	53.6	
Labour	John Burke	824	46.4	
Majority		129	7.2	
Turnout		1,777		
Conservative gain from Labour		Swing		

Huncoat
Party	Candidate	Votes	%	±%
Labour	Brendan Shiel	905	57.6	
Conservative	Patricia Day	666	42.4	
Majority		239	15.2	
Turnout		1,571		
Labour hold		Swing		

Immanuel
Party	Candidate	Votes	%	±%
Conservative	Jean Lockwood	908	52.5	
Labour	Edwina McCormack	822	47.5	
Majority		186	5.0	
Turnout		1,730		
Conservative hold		Swing		

Milnshaw
Party	Candidate	Votes	%	±%
Labour	Malcolm Pritchard	1,061	53.7	
Conservative	Derek Scholes	914	46.3	
Majority		147	7.4	
Turnout		1,975		
Labour hold		Swing		

Overton
Party	Candidate	Votes	%	±%
Conservative	David Mason	1,344	51.9	
Labour	Dennis Baron	1,246	48.1	
Majority		98	3.8	
Turnout		2,590		
Conservative hold		Swing		

Rishton
Party	Candidate	Votes	%	±%
Labour	Winifred Jackson	1,311	52.2	
Conservative	Stanley Horne	1,202	47.8	
Majority		109	4.4	
Turnout		2,513		
Labour gain from Conservative		Swing		

St Oswald's
Party	Candidate	Votes	%	±%
Conservative	Brian Roberts	1,343	55.7	
Labour	John McCormack	1,069	44.3	
Majority		274	11.4	
Turnout		2,412		
Conservative hold		Swing		
