= 2016 Hyndburn Borough Council election =

2016 UK local government election

← 2015	5 May 2016	2018 →

12 of 35 seats to Hyndburn Borough Council 18 seats needed for a majority
	First party	Second party	Third party
Leader	Miles Parkinson	Tony Dobson	Paul Thompson
Party	Labour	Conservative	UKIP
Leader's seat	Altham	Barnfield	St Oswald's
Seats before	25	8	2
Seats won	26	7	2
Seat change	▲1	▼1	Steady
- 2016 local election results in Hyndburn Labour Conservative Not contested

A by-thirds Hyndburn Borough Council local election took place on 5 May 2016. Approximately one third of the local council's 35 seats fell up for election on that day. The following year (one year out of four, next due in 2017) sees Lancashire County Council elections for all residents of this borough.

== Background ==
Before the election Labour had a majority of 25 councillors, Conservatives had 8 councillors, while UKIP had 2 councillors.

Labour candidates contested every ward, Conservative candidates contested every ward except Peel-ward, UKIP Candidates contested eight wards (not including their two-uncontested-seats, already won in 2014) and Greens only had two candidates in Altham-ward and Overton-ward.

== Local Election result ==
The majority grouping of councillors was as the headline result of the election, was that Labour's majority was reinforced by one, with Conservatives having lost one of their seats to Labour, Ukip failed to gain any additional seats:

After the election, the composition of the council was -

- Labour 26
- Conservative 7
- UKIP 2

Hyndburn Local Election Result 2016 – Electorate 46,874 (over just 12 wards) - with 35.8% turnout
Party	Seats	Gains	Losses	Net gain/loss	Seats %	Votes %	Votes	+/−
Labour	10	1	0	1	83.33%	51.14%	8,592	-759
Conservative	2	0	1	-1	16.67%	33.05%	5,553	-332
UKIP	0	0	0	0	0.0%	14.71%	2,471	1,841
Green	0	0	0	0	0.0%	1.11%	186	N/A
Spoilt Ballots	...	...	...	...	0.0%	0.83%	141	N/A

The four (out of 16) Hyndburn Local Borough Council ward seats that were not up for re election in 2016 include the following wards, Clayton Le Moors, Huncoat, Immanuel in Oswaldtwistle and Milnshaw in Accrington.

The Church Ward seat, formerly held by Labour Councillor Joan Smith since 2012, and following her resignation in October 2015, was left vacated without a by election called.

Previous Councillors who were Standing-Down in this election included - Chris Fisher (Lab) (Altham), Joan Smith (Lab) (Church), Kerry Molineux (Lab) (Overton), Wendy Dwyer (Lab) (Peel), Harry Grayson (Lab) (Rishton), Bill Pinder (Lab) (St. Andrews).

== Ward by ward ==
=== Altham ===
Altham – Electorate 4,064
Party	Candidate	Votes	%	±%
Labour	Steve Button	551	46.46	−15.66
Conservative	John Frank Bargh	278	23.24	1.97
UKIP	Janet Brown	245	20.48	N/A
Green	Patrick Bolam	115	9.62	N/A
...	spoilt votes	7	...	
Majority		273	22.83	N/A
Turnout		1,196	29.43	
Labour hold		Swing		

=== Barnfield ===
Barnfield – Electorate 3,394
Party	Candidate	Votes	%	±%
Conservative	Tony Dobson	635	46.93	−9.95
Labour	Jodie Travis	588	43.46	0.05
UKIP	John Errol Taylor	126	9.31	N/A
...	spoilt votes	4	...	
Majority		47	3.47	N/A
Turnout		1,353	39.86	
Conservative hold		Swing		

=== Baxenden ===
Baxenden – Electorate 3,341
Party	Candidate	Votes	%	±%
Conservative	Terence Keith Hurn	654	50.74	−13.68
Labour	David Hartley	407	31.57	−4.01
UKIP	Stewart Ian Scott	226	17.53	N/A
...	spoilt votes	2	...	
Majority		247	19.16	N/A
Turnout		1,289	38.58	
Conservative hold		Swing		

=== Central ===
Central – Electorate 3,788
Party	Candidate	Votes	%	±%
Labour	Abdul Ghafar Khan	1157	59.73	1.90
Conservative	Kazi Siddique	753	38.87	−3.30
...	spoilt votes	27	...	
Majority		404	20.86	N/A
Turnout		1,937	51.14	
Labour hold		Swing		

=== Church ===
Church – Electorate 3,446
Party	Candidate	Votes	%	±%
Labour	Jean Battle	777	80.02	21.44
Conservative	Marion Raynor	176	18.13	−8.69
...	spoilt votes	18	...	
Majority		601	61.89	N/A
Turnout		971	28.18	
Labour hold		Swing		

=== Netherton ===
Netherton – Electorate 3,287
Party	Candidate	Votes	%	±%
Labour	Noordad Aziz	698	50.95	−14.31
Conservative	Liz McGinley	388	28.32	−6.42
UKIP	Tom Linklater	273	19.93	N/A
...	spoilt votes	11	...	
Majority		310	22.63	N/A
Turnout		1,370	41.68	
Labour hold		Swing		

=== Overton ===
Overton – Electorate 5,078
Party	Candidate	Votes	%	±%
Labour	Stephanie Haworth	771	39.48	−6.32
Conservative	Patrick John McGinley	702	35.94	15.52
UKIP	Ian Robinson	403	20.63	8.81
Green	Joan Elizabeth West	71	3.64	N/A
...	spoilt votes	6	...	
Majority		69	3.53	N/A
Turnout		1,953	38.46	
Labour hold		Swing		

=== Peel ===
Peel – Electorate 3,137
Party	Candidate	Votes	%	±%
Labour	Paddy Short	593	69.19	1.49
UKIP	Liam Finbar Clark	259	30.22	N/A
...	spoilt votes	5	...	
Majority		334	38.97	N/A
Turnout		857	27.32	
Labour hold		Swing		

=== Rishton ===
Rishton – Electorate 5,161
Party	Candidate	Votes	%	±%
Labour	Jeff Scales	766	41.56	−29.74
Conservative	Ann Scaife	632	34.29	5.59
UKIP	David George Dowling	439	23.82	N/A
...	spoilt votes	6	...	
Majority		134	7.27	N/A
Turnout		1,843	35.71	
Labour hold		Swing		

=== Spring Hill ===
Spring Hill – Electorate 3,654
Party	Candidate	Votes	%	±%
Labour	Munsif Dad	998	76.48	16.26
Conservative	Abdul Qayyum	271	20.77	−4.85
...	spoilt votes	36	...	
Majority		727	55.71	N/A
Turnout		1,305	35.71	
Labour hold		Swing		

=== St. Andrew's ===
St. Andrew's – Electorate 3,409
Party	Candidate	Votes	%	±%
Labour	Stewart Thurston Eaves	573	53.90	1.28
Conservative	Josh Blayne Allen	476	44.78	−2.60
...	spoilt votes	14	...	
Majority		97	9.13	N/A
Turnout		1,063	31.18	
Labour hold		Swing		

=== St. Oswald's ===
St. Oswald's – Electorate 5,115
Party	Candidate	Votes	%	±%
Labour	Glen Kevin Harrison	713	39.48	3.92
Conservative	Marlene Heather Haworth	588	32.56	−8.05
UKIP	Christopher Bret Matthew	500	27.69	3.86
...	spoilt votes	5	...	
Majority		125	6.92	N/A
Turnout		1,806	35.31	
Labour gain from Conservative		Swing		
