= 2011 Hyndburn Borough Council election =

English local election

- 5 May 2011

11 of 35 seats to Hyndburn Borough Council 18 seats needed for a majority

	First party	Second party
Leader	Miles Parkinson	Peter Britcliffe
Party	Labour	Conservative
Leader's seat	Altham	St Andrew's
Seats before	15	18
Seats after	18	14
Seat change	▲3	▼4
	Third party
Leader	David Mason
Party	Independents in Hyndburn
Seats before	2
Seats after	3
Seat change	▲1
- 2011 local election results in Hyndburn Labour Conservative Independent Not contested

Elections to Hyndburn Borough Council were held on 5 May 2011. One third of the council-seats were up for election.

== Background ==
Before the election Conservatives had a single-seat majority of 18 councillors, Labour had 15 councillors, while Independent (politician) had 2 councillors.

Conservative and Labour candidates contested for every seat. Independents were defending a single seat, but 'various' candidates were contesting five wards. UKIP's only single candidate contested in the Central ward.

== Local election result ==
After the election, the composition of the council was:

- Labour 18
- Conservative 14
- Independent 3

Hyndburn local election result 2011 - over just 12 wards
Party	Seats	Gains	Losses	Net gain/loss	Seats %	Votes %	Votes	+/−
Labour	7	3	0	3	58.33	51.3	10,173	1,956
Conservative	3	0	4	-4	25.0	40.0	7,932	-680
Independent	2	1	0	1	8.6	8.3	1,639	801
UKIP	0	0	0	0	...	...	88	N/A

The four (out of 16) Hyndburn Local Borough Council ward seats that were NOT up for re-election in 2011 included the following wards - Netherton in Gt. Harwood, Peel and Spring Hill in Accrington, plus St. Andrews in Oswaldtwistle.

== Ward results ==
=== Altham ===
Altham
Party	Candidate	Votes	%	±%
Labour	Miles Parkinson	999	65.77	3.77
Conservative	Paul Todd	520	34.23	−3.77
Turnout		1,519	37.9	
Labour hold		Swing		

=== Barnfield ===
Barnfield
Party	Candidate	Votes	%	±%
Labour	June Harrison	756	50.98	20.28
Conservative	Paul Barton	650	43.83	−12.07
Independent	Tony Hindle	77	5.19	N/A
Turnout		1,483	44.3	
Labour gain from Conservative		Swing		

=== Baxenden ===
Baxenden
Party	Candidate	Votes	%	±%
Conservative	Kath Pratt	845	57.44	−15.16
Labour	David Hartley	626	42.56	15.16
Turnout		1,471	45.2	
Conservative hold		Swing		

=== Central ===
Central
Party	Candidate	Votes	%	±%
Labour	Mohammed Ayub	1602	71.71	14.31
Conservative	Razaq Hussain	544	24.35	−18.25
UKIP	Bobby Anwar	88	3.94	N/A
Turnout		2,234	59.9	
Labour hold		Swing		

=== Church ===
Church
Party	Candidate	Votes	%	±%
Labour	John Broadley	845	66.12	4.22
Conservative	Mohammed Hussain	433	33.88	−4.22
Turnout		1,278	39.7	
Labour hold		Swing		

=== Clayton-le-Moors ===
Clayton-le-Moors
Party	Candidate	Votes	%	±%
Independents in Hyndburn	Nick Collingridge	579	36.28	N/A
Labour	Chris Fisher	575	36.03	−10.67
Conservative	Janet Storey	442	27.69	−25.61
Turnout		1,596	43.5	
Independent gain from Conservative		Swing		

=== Huncoat ===
Huncoat
Party	Candidate	Votes	%	±%
Independents in Hyndburn	David Parkins	980	63.64	9.84
Conservative	Jean Hurn	345	22.40	4.7
Labour	Sam Cudworth	215	13.96	−14.54
Turnout		1,540	44.3	
Independent hold		Swing		

=== Immanuel ===
Immanuel
Party	Candidate	Votes	%	±%
Conservative	Judith Addison	878	54.57	2.37
Labour	John McCormack	731	45.43	−2.37
Turnout		1,609	45.7	
Conservative hold		Swing		

=== Milnshaw ===
Milnshaw
Party	Candidate	Votes	%	±%
Labour	Paul Cox	710	45.37	−19.83
Conservative	Roger Jepson	372	23.77	−11.03
Independent	Malcolm Pritchard	460	29.39	N/A
Independent	Christian Rayner	23	1.47	N/A
Turnout		1,565	44.6	
Labour hold		Swing		

=== Overton ===
Overton
Party	Candidate	Votes	%	±%
Labour	Gareth Molineux	988	44.34	1.94
Conservative	Roy Atkinson	740	33.21	−24.39
Independents in Hyndburn	David Mason	500	22.44	N/A
Turnout		2,228	44.6	
Labour gain from Conservative		Swing		

=== Rishton ===
Rishton
Party	Candidate	Votes	%	±%
Labour	Clare Cleary	1180	52.28	4.38
Conservative	Stanley Horne	1077	47.72	−4.38
Turnout		2,257	44.4	
Labour gain from Conservative		Swing		

=== St. Oswald's ===
St. Oswald's
Party	Candidate	Votes	%	±%
Conservative	Brian Roberts	1086	53.44	−9.36
Labour	Stewart Eaves	946	46.56	9.36
Turnout		2,032	39.9	
Conservative hold		Swing		
