= Borough of Rossendale =

Borough and non-metropolitan district in Lancashire, England

- Borough and non-metropolitan district
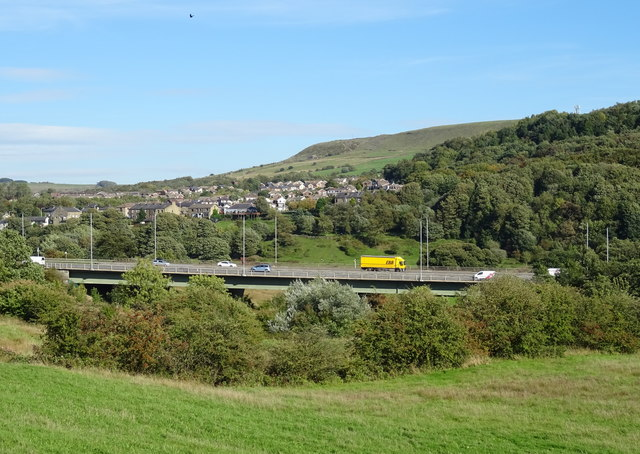
- Rossendale Valley in 2018

- Rossendale shown within Lancashire and England
- Coordinates: 53°41′00″N 02°15′00″W
- Sovereign state: United Kingdom
- Constituent country: England
- Region: North West England
- Ceremonial county: Lancashire
- Admin. HQ: Bacup

Government
  - Type: Rossendale Borough Council
  - MPs: Andy MacNae (Labour)

Area
  - Total: 53 sq mi (138 km^{2})
  - Rank: 171st

Population (2025)
  - Total: 73,688
  - Rank: Ranked 283rd
  - Density: 1,380/sq mi (534/km^{2})

Ethnicity (2021)
  - Ethnic groups: List: 92.4% White; 5.5% Asian; 1.5% Mixed; 0.4% other; 0.2% Black

Religion (2021)
  - Religion: List: 48.8% Christianity; 40.1% no religion; 5.2% not stated; 4.9% Islam; 0.5% other; 0.3% Buddhism; 0.1% Hinduism; 0.1% Judaism; 0.1% Sikhism
- Time zone: UTC+0 (Greenwich Mean Time)
  - Summer (DST): UTC+1 (British Summer Time)
- Postcode: BB, BL, OL
- ONS code: 30UM (ONS); E07000125 (GSS)

Rossendale (/ˈrɒzəndeɪl/) is a local government district with borough status in Lancashire, England. Its council is based in Bacup and its largest town is Rawtenstall. It also includes the towns of Haslingden and Whitworth. The borough is named after the Rossendale Valley, the upper part of the valley of the River Irwell.

The neighbouring districts are Burnley, Hyndburn, Blackburn with Darwen, Bury, Bolton, Calderdale and Rochdale.

== Toponymy ==
The name Rossendale is first recorded in 1292. A record of the name as Rocendal (1242) suggests Celtic ros "moor, heath", with Old Norse dalr "dale, valley", hence moor valley i.e. the valley of the River Irwell.

== History ==
Rossendale is part of the Forest of Rossendale, which consists of the steep-sided valleys of the River Irwell and its tributaries, which flow from the Pennines southwards to Manchester and cut through the moorland which is characteristic of the area. It was given the designation of "forest" in medieval times denoting a hunting reserve.

The larger settlements grew into market towns, typically through the late Middle Ages. Farming and a cottage woollen industry developed during the reign of Henry VIII, but Rossendale's population only really expanded during the period of the Industrial Revolution. The population of the area that would become the modern borough of Rossendale was 24,136 in 1801; in 1901 it had grown to 89,540. Its wet and damp climate are ideally suited to the development of watermills, and later to the mechanisation of the wool and cotton spinning and weaving industries in the 18th and 19th centuries. In the middle of the 19th century a felt industry developed, and from this the manufacturing of slippers so that footwear also became a major employer in the area.

The area became one of the cradles of the Industrial Revolution, and was known as 'The Golden Valley'. There was great hardship among working people during this time, but many fortunes were made among the mill-owning classes. There was large-scale immigration from Ireland to find work building the railways and in the mills, which led to several instances of serious civil disturbances between the two communities. Michael Davitt, the Irish republican leader was among these immigrants, settling in Haslingden, where he received his education after losing an arm at the age of 11 in a mill accident.

The area is also notable for its quarrying, and Rossendale Flagstone was used widely throughout the country in the 19th century. The flagstones in Trafalgar Square in London were quarried in Rossendale. Upland farming is still carried out, largely of sheep but also of cattle. The history of Rossendale is well documented, largely through the efforts of the historian Chris Aspin, a specialist on the textile industry, and Derek Pilkington, whose efforts led to the preservation of Higher Mill in Helmshore, now Helmshore Mills Textile Museum.

The Whitworth Doctors were local surgeons and bone setters in the late 1700s and early 1800s whose reputation spread far and wide, so that they treated patients from throughout the country. In 1819 William Hewitt described them as "the most remarkable men of their class that ever appeared in England".

R.S. Ireland (The Real Lancashire Black Pudding Co.) is based near Haslingden; a family-run business of specialist black pudding makers, using only traditional methods and with a recipe dating back to 1879. Rawtenstall has Mr Fitzpatrick's, this is the last remaining functioning temperance bar in England, that makes and sells its own non-alcoholic drinks, such as sarsaparilla, black beers and blood tonic.

In recent years, Rossendale has seen the development of digital and creative sector initiatives supported by collaborative workspaces, community projects, skills programmes and business networks. The borough benefits from strong transport links to Manchester, whilst also developing locally based digital infrastructure and entrepreneurship initiatives. Examples include projects such as Rossendale Digital Hub at Christ Church in Bacup, Studio Rawtenstall at The Old Milk Depot, Empowered Collective's creative studio spaces in Waterfoot and wider proposals linked to digital skills, innovation and collaborative working environments across the borough.

=== Administrative history ===
The modern district was created on 1 April 1974 under the Local Government Act 1972, covering the whole area of four former districts and part of a fifth, which were abolished at the same time:

- Bacup Municipal Borough
- Haslingden Municipal Borough
- Ramsbottom Urban District (North and Walmersley cum Shuttleworth (Note: Despite the name, the Walmersley cum Shuttleworth ward did not include the settlements of Walmersley or Shuttleworth, but instead covered the rural parts of the ancient township of Walmersley cum Shuttleworth left over after Walmersley had been absorbed by Bury in 1872 and Shuttleworth by Ramsbottom in 1883.) wards only, rest went to Bury)
- Rawtenstall Municipal Borough
- Whitworth Urban District

The new district was named Rossendale, referring both to the Rossendale Valley and to the associated medieval Forest of Rossendale which had covered a similar area. The new district was awarded borough status from its creation, allowing the chair of the council to take the title of mayor.

Under current local government reorganisation plans, all district councils in Lancashire, as well as the county council, will be abolished in 2028, with the district becoming part of a new Pennine Lancashire unitary authority.

== Governance ==
Rossendale Borough Council

Type
- Type: Non-metropolitan district

History
- Founded: 1 April 1974

Leadership
- Mayor: Liz McInnes, Labour since 22 May 2026
- Leader: Alyson Barnes, Labour since 20 May 2011
- Chief Executive: Rob Huntington since April 2023

Structure
- Seats: 30 councillors
- Graph of the party split among 30 seats.
- Political groups: Administration (19) Labour (19) Other parties (11) Conservative (5) Green (4) Community First (1) Reform (1)

Elections
- Voting system: Plurality at-large
- Last election: 2 May 2024

Meeting place
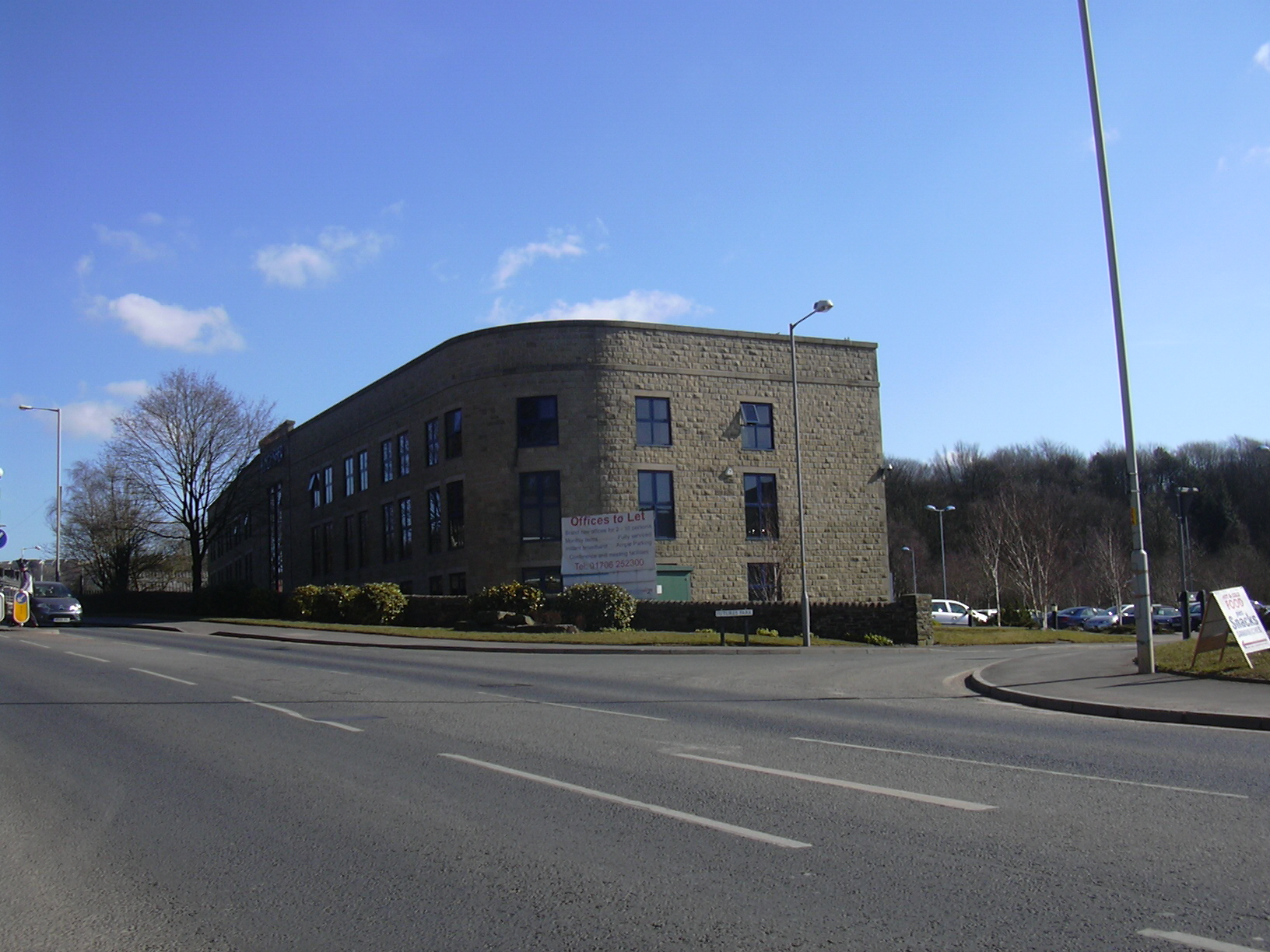
- The Business Centre, Futures Park, Bacup, OL13 0BB

Website
- rossendale.gov.uk

Rossendale Borough Council provides district-level services. County-level services are provided by Lancashire County Council. Whitworth is also a civil parish, which forms a third tier of local government in that part of the borough.

=== Political control ===
The first election to the council was held in 1973, initially operating as a shadow authority alongside the outgoing authorities until coming into its powers on 1 April 1974. Since 1974 political control of the council has been as follows:

Party in control	Years
No overall control	1974–1976
Conservative	1976–1986
Labour	1986–2000
Conservative	2000–2002
Labour	2002–2003
No overall control	2003–2004
Conservative	2004–2007
No overall control	2007–2008
Conservative	2008–2011
No overall control	2011–2012
Labour	2012–2021
No overall control	2021–2022
Labour	2022–present

=== Leadership ===
The role of mayor is largely ceremonial in Rossendale. Political leadership is instead provided by the leader of the council. The leaders since 2004 have been:

Councillor	Party	From	To
Peter Steen	Conservative		Dec 2004
Duncan Ruddick	Conservative	16 Dec 2004	19 Dec 2007
Tony Swain	Conservative	19 Dec 2007	8 May 2011
Alyson Barnes	Labour	20 May 2011	

=== Composition ===
Following the 2024 election, and subsequent by-elections and changes of allegiance up to April 2026, the composition of the council was:

Party	Seats
Labour	19
Conservative	5
Green	4
Community First	1
Reform	1
Total	30

=== Elections ===
Since the last boundary changes in 2024 the council has comprised 30 councillors representing 10 wards, with each ward electing three councillors. Elections are held every four years.

=== Premises ===
The council is based at The Business Centre on Futures Park in Bacup. It was built as commercial offices called the Kingfisher Business Centre in 2003. The council took some office space in the building before creating a council chamber there in 2009 and consolidating its functions at the site.

Prior to 2009 the council was based at Rawtenstall Town Hall at the corner of Bacup Road and Lord Street. It had been built in 1876 as the "Exchange Club" and was subsequently acquired in 1890 by the Rawtenstall Local Board (predecessor of the Rawtenstall Borough Council) for use as its offices. The building was later extended into the offices of an adjoining tramway depot.

== Transport ==
The borough is linked by the motorway network to Manchester, Burnley and Blackburn via the A56/M65 and M66 motorways.

There was once a rail link south to Manchester via Bury, but this was closed in 1966 as part of cuts following the Beeching Report. Part of the old railway reopened in 1991 as the East Lancashire Railway operating a service from Rawtenstall to Bury via Ramsbottom and Summerseat, and manned by volunteers. In September 2003 an eastbound extension from Bury to Heywood was opened.

In March 2015, it was proposed to reintroduce a rail service between Rawtenstall, Bury and Manchester. This would use the current route of the East Lancashire Heritage Railway.

The area is well served by public road transport, with bus services provided mainly by Rosso and Burnley Bus Company. These provide regular services to Burnley, Blackburn, Accrington, Bolton, Bury, Manchester and Rochdale as well as Todmorden and other local destinations.

== Education in Rossendale ==
Rossendale contains multiple secondary schools, these are:

- All Saints' Catholic High School
- Alder Grange School
- Bacup and Rawtenstall Grammar School (selective state school)
- Haslingden High School
- The Valley Leadership Academy
- Whitworth Community High School
- Rossendale School (Specialist Autism School)

In addition, there is Accrington and Rossendale College, based in Accrington.

== Media ==
In terms of television, the area is served by BBC North West and ITV Granada. Television signals are received from the Winter Hill TV transmitter.

Local radio stations are BBC Radio Lancashire, Heart North West, Capital Manchester and Lancashire, Greatest Hits Radio Lancashire, and Rossendale Radio, a community based radio station which broadcasts from studios in Rawtenstall.

The area is served by local newspaper, Lancashire Telegraph.

== Arts ==
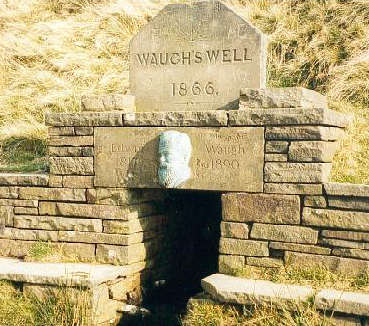
Waugh's Well in 2007

Rossendale is the home to a large community of artists with several painters' studios, many of which are centred on the area around Waterfoot. Rossendale's only traditional theatre is in Bacup. The Royal Court Theatre first opened in 1893 and has a thriving Youth Theatre called The Rossendale Musical Theatre Academy. The theatre and arts centre known as 'The Boo' as well as being a regular venue for family theatre shows, music and a wide range of community arts events, is the home of the Horse and Bamboo Theatre Company who specialise in visual theatre, often using distinctive puppets and masks. The painters and other artists who make up the major studios within the valley – Globe Arts, Prospect Studio, Valley Artists – along with the Boo, the Whitaker, Apna Rossendale, and individual artists now work together to open their studios and premises each year at the Rossendale Art Trail Open Studios weekend in late summer.

The first part of the Irwell Sculpture Trail runs from Deerplay, above Bacup, to Stubbins. The actress Jane Horrocks was born in Rawtenstall, Rossendale, and the composer Alan Rawsthorne was born in Haslingden. Betty Jackson, the fashion designer, is a native of Bacup.

In the 18th and 19th centuries the Larks of Dean were an unusual group of working class musicians whose music-making at the Baptist Chapel in Goodshaw Fold became an important local feature. There is also a brass band tradition as well as an amateur theatre scene. There was once over 40 bands in and around Rossendale, including the Irwell Springs Band whose fame was at a peak at the turn of the 19th century. There are currently the Haslingden and Helmshore Band, Rossendale Encore Concert Band, Goodshaw Band, Stacksteads Band, Water Band, 2nd Rossendale Scout Group Band, Whitworth Vale & Healey Band, Whitworth Youth Band, Haslingden Concert Band and the Whitworth Veterans' Band. Rossendale is home to a unique dancing troupe, the Britannia Coconut Dancers, formed in the mid-19th century, and who traditionally dance along the local roads every Easter.

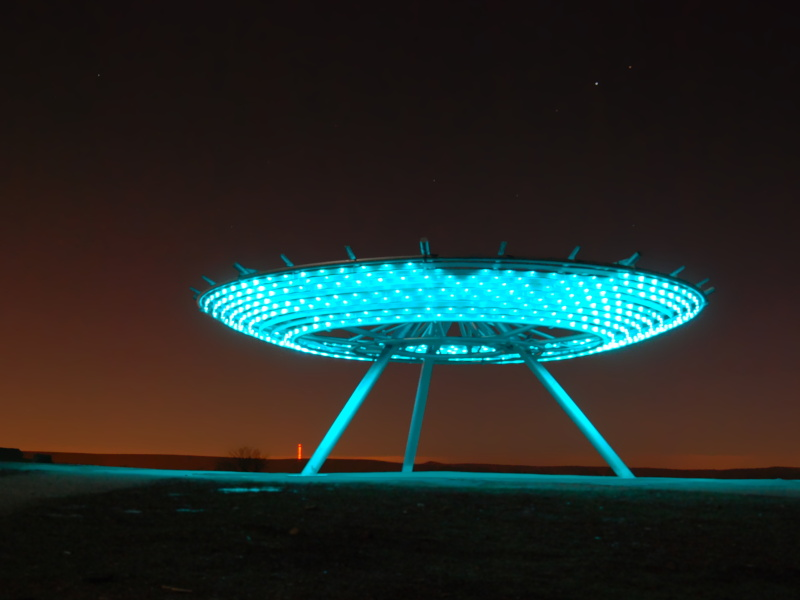
Haslingden Halo in 2009

There has been a long tradition of dialect poetry and writing in Rossendale. Local poets have included Andrew Houston (The Rossendale Bard), Walter Hargreaves (Shepster) and Clifford Heyworth (Bill o' Bows). Waugh's Well, above Edenfield and Cowpe, marks the spot where Edwin Waugh wrote many of his poems, and is a favourite spot for walkers – a popular activity in Rossendale that does not appear to be in decline.

The Halo is an artwork in the form of an 18m-diameter steel lattice structure supported on a tripod overlooking Haslingden, positioned to be clearly visible from the M66 and A56 approach to Lancashire. Designed by John Kennedy and selected as part of a design competition managed by RIBA Competitions which was launched in 2003. It is lit after dark using low-energy LEDs powered by an adjacent wind turbine. It is the fourth Panopticon in Lancashire. It, and the adjacent landscaped area at Top o'Slate, was opened to the public in September 2007, and was designed by John Kennedy of LandLab and engineered by Booth King Partnership.

Rossendale is also home to touring theatre company Hard Graft. Established in 1999 Hard Graft found notoriety in the UK touring non theatre venues. Their first tour was with their award-winning comedy Thick As Thieves, touring living rooms throughout the UK. They then toured 56 charity shops with Burt n Joyce turning each shop into a theatre for the evening.

== Sports and entertainment ==
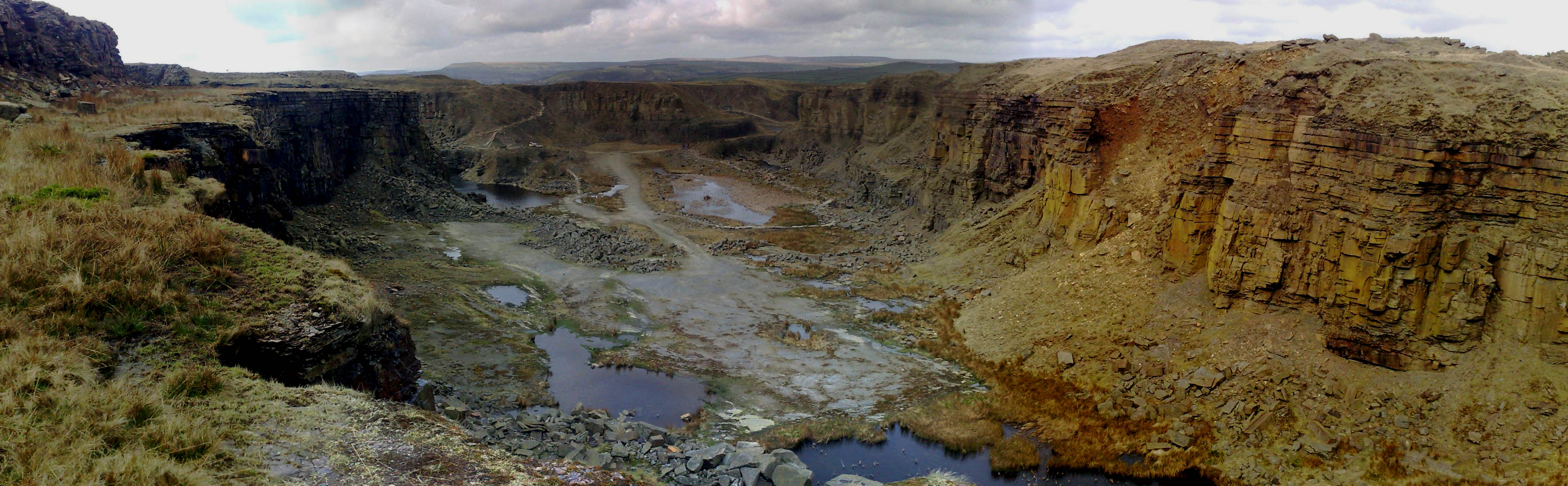
Lee Quarry now contains a purpose-built mountain bike trail.

Three Rossendale towns have cricket clubs in the Lancashire League – Bacup, Haslingden and Rawtenstall. The overseas professionals who are associated with the League have therefore often lived in the Rossendale Valley. For example, Everton Weekes was long associated with Bacup; Clive Lloyd with Haslingden. Edenfield Cricket Club are also associated with the Lancashire League but only participate in the leagues T/20 competition.

Rossendale rugby club for many years had been a small rugby union club playing in the lower leagues, but in recent years the club has gained two promotions to take them into Regional 1 North West. Notable players such as Daniel Collins, Dave Wood and Tim Fourie now play at the valley side.

The area's only semi-pro non league football team are Bacup Borough F.C. who play their home games at West View and are members of the North West Counties League Division One. The area's other major non league side Rossendale United, who played their home games at nearby Newchurch near Rawtenstall, folded in 2011. The only other semi-pro team from the Rossendale area are Ramsbottom United who play in the Northern Premier League Division One North. Previously there had been Haslingden F.C., playing at Ewood Bridge, on the outskirts of Haslingden, until they folded in 1998. Their ground was later used briefly by Stand Athletic F.C. before they vacated and moved back to Whitefield in Greater Manchester. Other clubs around the Rossendale area are all from Step 7 (Level 11) and below, and so playing in various leagues at this level – the West Lancashire Football League (Rossendale FC & Haslingden St Mary's), East Lancashire League (Stacksteads St Joseph's, Water FC), Lancashire Amateur League (Rossendale FC, Whitworth Valley, Valley United).

The popular comedy series, The League of Gentlemen, is apparently based upon Rossendale (and perhaps Bacup in particular), playing upon stereotypes and exaggerations of the area. Subsequently, the producers filmed in various northern towns, one of which was Bacup itself, which Jeremy Dyson (writer) and Steve Pemberton (actor) proclaimed, "Bacup was the furthest we went into Lancashire. Bacup was our hot favourite, but it was too frightening – when we arrived there was this cartoon drunk with a bottle shaking his fist at us. Bacup in real life was worse than Royston Vasey".

Various towns within the Rossendale Valley were used for filming scenes of the BBC TV series Hetty Wainthropp Investigates during the 1990s.

The 1980's BBC drama series Juliet Bravo was filmed in Rossendale with the exterior of Bacup police station serving as the fictional Hartley police station.

During autumn 2008 areas around Rossendale were used in the filming of the BBC TV series Survivors including the Airtours site and other sites in Helmshore and Bank Street in Rawtenstall.

Local radio station Rossendale Radio broadcast throughout the valley from 2010, before shutting down on 5 March 2012 due to financial difficulties. It then re-launched on 22 December 2018.

The Rossendale Male Voice Choir formed in the valley in 1924.

== Settlements ==
Towns, villages and hills in the Borough of Rossendale

In the 2001 census the population of Rossendale was 65,652, spread between the towns of Bacup, Haslingden, Whitworth and Rawtenstall; the villages of Crawshawbooth, Edenfield, Helmshore and Waterfoot; and as well as Britannia, Broadclough, Chatterton, Cloughfold, Cowpe, Irwell Vale, Loveclough, Newchurch, Shawforth, Stacksteads, Stubbins, Turn and Weir. The population at the 2011 Census had risen to 67,922.

=== Urban Area ===
Much of the borough forms part of the Accrington/Rossendale built-up area which extends into the neighbouring borough of Hyndburn. The Accrington/Rossendale built-up area extends from the towns of Rawtenstall and Bacup to Accrington which takes in parts of the boroughs of Hyndburn and Rossendale. The urban area was recorded at having a population of 125,059.

=== Civil parishes ===
Whitworth parish shown within Rossendale

Whitworth is the only civil parish in Rossendale. The parish council has declared the parish to be a town, allowing it to take the style "town council". The rest of the borough is an unparished area.

== Notable current and past residents ==
For notable past residents see individual towns and villages

- Lauren Bowker – designer
- Agyness Deyn – model
- Natalie Casey – actress/presenter (Hollyoaks)
- Jane Horrocks – actress
- Ted Robbins – actor/comedian (Phoenix Nights)
- William Roache – actor
- Phil Neville – footballer (Everton)
- Sam Aston – actor (Coronation Street)
- Jennie McAlpine – actress (Coronation Street)
- Andy Kershaw – DJ/reporter
- Liz Kershaw – DJ
- Karl Burns – punk drummer from the Fall
- David Trippier – Former Conservative environment minister
- Michael Carr – Former Liberal Democrat MP
- Frankee Connolly – member of music duo Mini Viva
- Phil Lester – YouTuber, author, and former BBC Radio 1 presenter
- Chris Allen – lead vocalist, the Troggs
- Sophie Lancaster – murder victim

== Twin town ==
Rossendale Borough Council is twinned with:

- Bocholt, Germany
