= Lumb, Rawtenstall =

Village in Lancashire, England

Coordinates: 53.720°N 2.247°W

Lumb
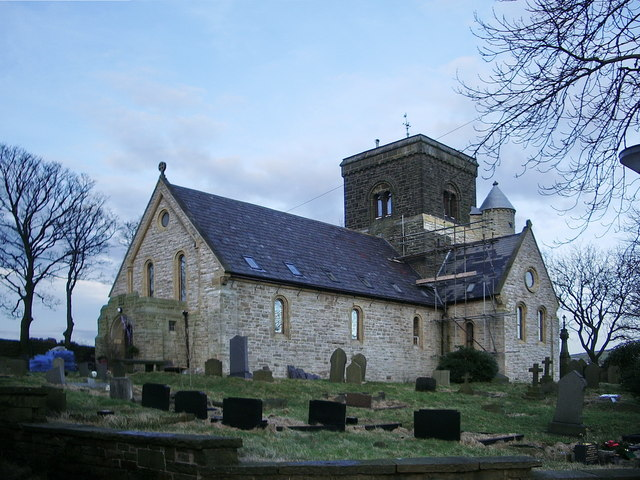
- St Michael on the Hill Church in 2008

- Location within Rossendale Location within Lancashire
- OS grid reference: SD837248
- District: Rossendale
- Shire county: Lancashire
- Region: North West
- Country: England
- Sovereign state: United Kingdom
- Post town: ROSSENDALE
- Postcode district: BB4
- Dialling code: 01706
- Police: Lancashire
- Fire: Lancashire
- Ambulance: North West
- UK Parliament: Rossendale and Darwen

Lumb is a small village within the Rossendale district of Lancashire, England. It lies in the valley of the Whitewell Brook, 3 miles (5 km) north east of Rawtenstall. It should not be confused with the hamlet of Lumb near Edenfield, also in the Rossendale district.

Lumb was historically in the large ancient parish of Whalley. In 1846 it was constituted a chapelry within the parish of Whalley, which also included the village of Water. In 1866 it became part of the civil parish of Newchurch, and in 1894 was transferred to the municipal borough and civil parish of Rawtenstall.

St Michael's parish church was founded in 1846.

== See also ==
- Listed buildings in Rawtenstall
