= Rossendale Radio =

Community radio station in North West England

Rossendale Radio Ltd
- Type: Limited Company
- Industry: Broadcasting
- Genre: Local radio and variety of music
- Predecessor: Rossendale Radio CIC
- Founded: 22 December 2018
- Headquarters: Rawtenstall, England, United Kingdom
- Area served: Rossendale
- Services: Radio
- Website: www.rossendaleradio.com

104.7 Rossendale Radio is a community radio station in the north west of England, broadcasting on 104.7 FM to Haslingden, Rawtenstall, Ramsbottom and surrounding areas and online at www.rossendaleradio.com.

== Broadcast area ==
The station's primary broadcasting area is the Rossendale Valley within East Lancashire and the adjoining area of northern Greater Manchester. The broadcast area consists of Baxenden, Edenfield, Haslingden, Helmshore, Loveclough, Ramsbottom, Rawtenstall, Rising Bridge, Stacksteads, Stubbins, Summerseat, Crawshawbooth, Waterfoot and parts of Bacup.

== Origins and history ==
Original Rossendale Radio logo

The station commenced official broadcasting on 1 May 2010 following a three-year period which saw the group apply and obtain a community radio licence from Ofcom and apply for funding from numerous sources.

The radio station was based at the Agapao Impact Centre in Haslingden. Ofcom awarded a community radio licence to "Rossendale Radio CIC" and was originally planned to run for at least five years.

=== Closure ===
On 5 March 2012, it was announced that the station would close down that day at 3 pm, due to ongoing financial difficulties. The station had previously failed several months earlier and been placed in liquidation by its owners Agapao during November 2011. A message on the station's Facebook page stated how the problems were "insurmountable" and that they had no choice but to cease broadcasting. Despite attempts to find new ways of working that would save the station, Rossendale Radio was deemed not financially viable. The news was met with great sadness from loyal listeners, with comments on the Facebook post expressing sympathy and how the station was a "great loss". In reply to the Facebook comments asking why the situation had happened one of the volunteer presenters at the station stated how "as a community radio station it is part of the licence requirement that community or social funding is obtained to 'match fund' against the income from commercial revenue. Not only were we unable to secure this funding to satisfy the licence agreement but the lack of community funding left us solely reliant on the commercial revenue we had coming in. Ultimately, due to the high cost of funding a radio station, this was not enough, and Rossendale Radio was regrettably forced to cease.".

== New Rossendale Radio ==
In December 2017, following a new application to Ofcom, a new five-year broadcast licence was awarded to broadcast once again to the Rossendale Valley.

The new group is made up of some former members of the old Rossendale Radio, who felt it was time that the area needed a radio station back, and following a successful application (submitted in July 2017), they were awarded the licence.

The station launched at 10:47 on 22 December 2018

== Genre ==
Rossendale Radio's music policy consists of contemporary music from the last five decades and also featured a number of specialist music programmes, consisting of rock, theatre/film, dance music, house music, new music, downtempo/chillout and other differing genres. Information, guests, interviews, local news and sport also featured extensively on the radio station.
