= Cowpe =

Hamlet in Lancashire, England

Coordinates: 53.682°N 2.244°W

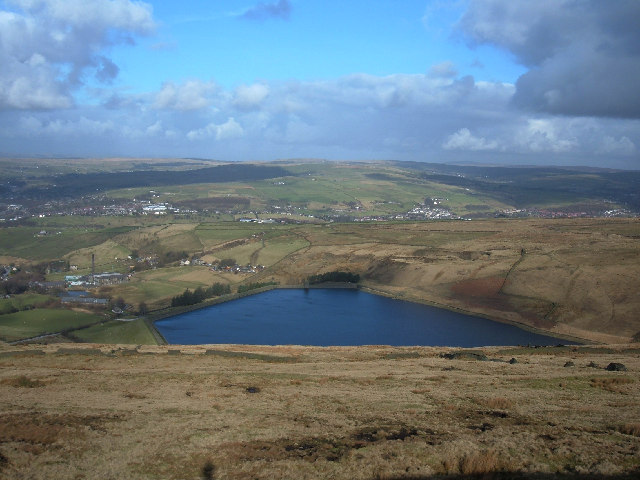
- Cowpe Reservoir in 2006

- Location within Rossendale Location within Lancashire
- OS grid reference: SD838206
- District: Rossendale
- Shire county: Lancashire
- Region: North West
- Country: England
- Sovereign state: United Kingdom
- Post town: Rossendale
- Postcode district: BB4
- Dialling code: 01706
- Police: Lancashire
- Fire: Lancashire
- Ambulance: North West
- UK Parliament: Rossendale and Darwen

Cowpe /kaʊp/ is a hamlet in Rossendale, Lancashire, England. It lies in the South Pennines, north of Scout Moor Wind Farm, by the Pennine Bridleway. Rawtenstall is to the west, Bacup to the east and Waterfoot to the north. Directly south over Brandwood and Scout Moors, is Rochdale. 'Cowpe' is thought to derive from 'Cow Pastures'.

Cowpe is renowned for its scenery, as is the whole of the Rossendale Valley, and houses farms supplying crops and livestock. The village has a Sunday school, and a park, designed by residents and opened in 2002 and a B & B (Tippet's Farm). Cowpe Reservoir is used by fishermen and has footpaths to the moors and is popular with walkers and mountain bikers. There is a Christmas tree farm, Lench House Farm.

The village's only public house, The Buck, was purchased and deliberately run down by "property developers", closing in 2012 for conversion to private housing.

Cowpe has a mixture of terraced houses, cottages, farmhouses, renovated houses and semi detached. They include Cowpe Lodge, Asten Buildings, Brooklands, Ivy Bank, The Linney, Daisy Bank, Springside, Spring Gardens, Co-operative Buildings, Crag View, Moor View, Bottoms Row, Holmes Cottages and Boarsgreave Lane. The village has been steadily growing over the last decade with many of the outlying derelict farms and barns being brought back into use.

Cowpe gained media attention when filming took place for the BBC One science fiction television series Survivors (2008–2010), which used farms and gardens for filming.

A key landmark of Cowpe, the 19th century Kearn's Mill eventually closed in 2002 when repeated flash flooding caused problems maintaining business insurance. Following several changes of ownership due to problems with site contamination, access and bad weather. It was demolished in 2015 to make way for a 22 property housing development by Skipton Properties.

It is part of the Rossendale and Darwen constituency, with Andy MacNae having been the Member of Parliament since July 2024.
