= Accrington Corporation Tramways =

Former Tramway company in Accrington

Operation
- Locale: Accrington
- Open: 2 August 1907
- Close: 31 March 1932
- Status: Closed

Infrastructure
- Track gauge: 4 ft (1,219 mm)
- Propulsion system: Electric
- Depot: Ellison Street

Statistics
- Route length: 7.02 miles (11.30 km)

Accrington Corporation Tramways operated a passenger tramway service in Accrington between 1907 and 1932.

== History ==
Tramway services in Accrington had been provided by the Accrington Corporation Steam Tramways Company since 1886. Despite the name, it was independent of the corporation. On 20 September 1907, Accrington Corporation formally purchased the Accrington Corporation Steam Tramways Company for £2,227 (equivalent to £231,628 in 2025).

Before the formal takeover, the corporation had started the electrification of the tramway. On 2 August 1907, a double track line to Church was opened and then a single track to Oswaldtwistle. On the day of purchase, the line to Clayton-le-Moors opened, followed a few weeks later by a line to the Cemetery at Huncoat, and then the line to Baxenden railway station.

The Baxenden line was extended to the Commercial Hotel in Haslingden on 28 September 1908 and then on 20 October to Lockgate for a connection with Rawtenstall Corporation Tramways.

== Fleet ==
The livery for the tramcars was red and cream.

- 1-4 Brush 1907
- 5-6 Brush 1908
- 7-20 Brush 1907
- 21-23 Brush 1909
- 24-25 Brush 1910
- 26-27 Brush 1912
- 28-30 Brush 1919
- 31-32 Brush 1920
- 38-39 Brush 1919
- 40-41 Brush 1920
- 42-43 Brush 1926

== Closure ==
On 30 April 1930, the tram route to Rawtenstall was closed, followed on 26 August 1931 by the routes to Clayton-le-Moors and Oswaldtwistle. The final tram ran to the Cemetery at Huncoat on 6 January 1932. Three of the 8-wheeled tramcars built by Brush in 1919-1920 saw further service on the Southend-on-Sea Corporation Tramways. They arrived there in 1934, and had to be regauged to run on the 3 ft 6 in (1,067 mm) gauge tracks. Five other cars, built by Brush in 1920–22, went on to work on the Llandudno and Colwyn Bay Electric Railway where they were also regauged to 3 ft 6 in (1,067 mm) gauge.1932.

== Bibliography ==
- Harley, Robert J (1994). Southend-on-Sea Tramways. Middleton Press. ISBN 978-1-873793-28-2.
