= John Stuart Hay =

British author and academic (1875–1949)

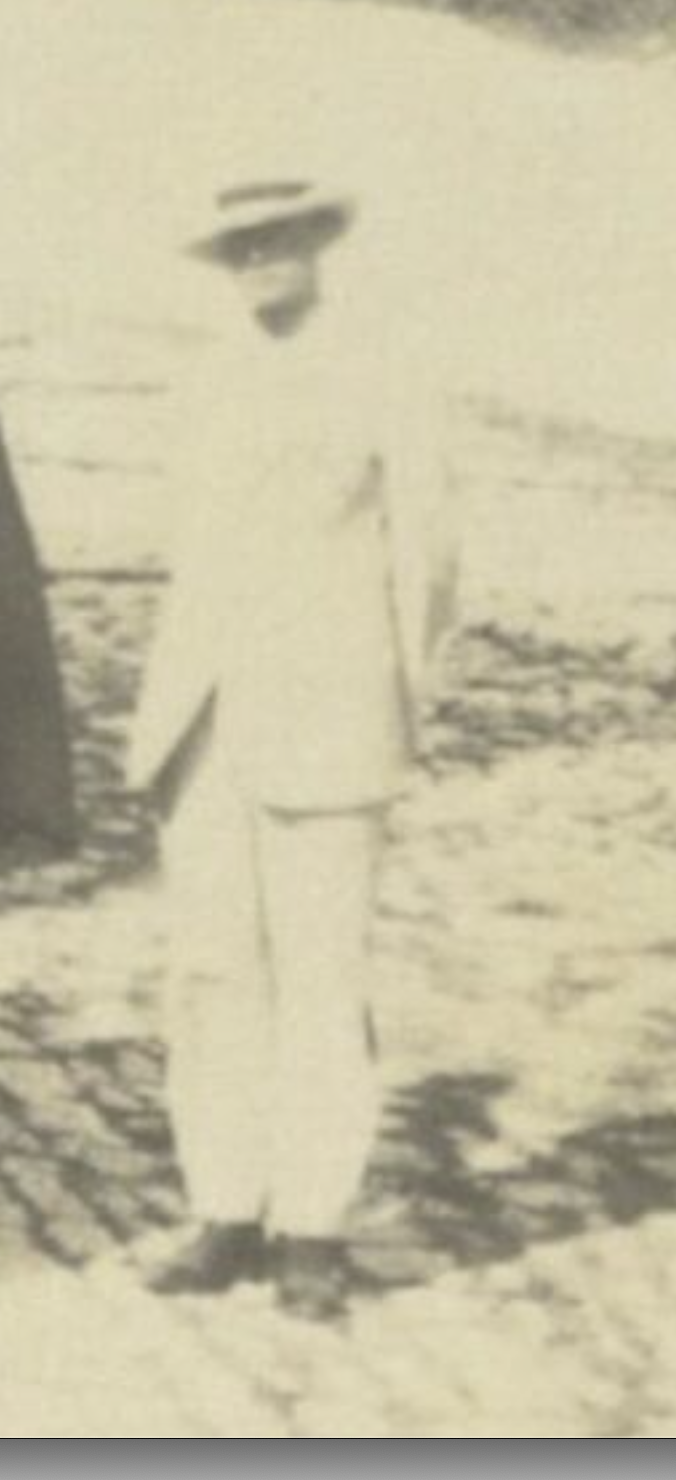
- Hay in 1929
- Born: John Stuart Hay; 27 September 1875; Liverpool Road, Shuttleworth, Lancashire, England
- Died: 26 April 1949 (aged 73)
- Education: St John's College, Oxford
- Occupations: Historian and author
- Writing career
- Years active: 1911-1949
- Genre: Ancient History
- Notable work: The Amazing Emperor Heliogabalus
- Military career
- Allegiance: United Kingdom
- Service years: 1914-1918
- Rank: Captain
- Unit: Intelligence Corps
- Conflicts: World War I

John Stuart Hay (27 September 1875 – 26 April 1949) was an English historian and author. He was best known for producing the first full-length biography of the Roman emperor Elagabalus, The Amazing Emperor Heliogabalus. Hay later produced the Hay Plan to counter the Irish Conscription Crisis of 1918. After the war, he moved to Athens, Greece, and worked as an antiquities dealer until his death.

== Early life ==
John Stuart Hay was born on 27 September 1875 in Shuttleworth, Lancashire. He grew up in a middle-class background and lived in Seaforth, Lancashire, before moving to Croydon in 1891. His education started at Whitgift Grammar School, now known as Whitgift School, in Croydon. Leaving it at the age of eighteen, he subsequently joined St John's College to read modern history.

Hay's middle-class upbringing can be evidenced by his inclusion in the 1896 Oxford University calendar in which he is listed as a “commoner”, the term used to describe students who lacked a scholarship or exhibition and thus could pay the tuition on their own. Hay attended St John's from 1895 to 1899 and was active in the college debating society. He graduated in 1899 with a 3rd class degree.

=== Religion and early career ===
On 11 March 1902, he arrived at Beda College in Rome, a seminary in which he trained to become a Roman Catholic priest. He spent the next two years at Beda College and was ordained as a Roman Catholic priest by the Archbishop of Trebizond, Edmund Stonor.

Hay's experience with Catholicism strangely came to an end in 1905 when he was received into the Church of England. He initially took a position at a small Oxford church called St Peter-in-the-East, which closed in 1965 and now operates as the library for St. Edmund's college on the Oxford campus. During Hay's time, it was a small church that served a congregation of mainly Oxford students and staff. Hay spent two years in this church, from 1906 to 1908, where he had nearby access to the vast library of his alma mater St John's College to aid his research into Emperor Elagabalus.

== The Amazing Emperor Heliogabalus ==
In 1911, Hay published The Amazing Emperor Heliogabalus, the first biography of Roman emperor Elagabalus. Published by Macmillian, the book includes an introduction by the prominent classicist John Bagnell Bury who Hay cites as contributing significantly to research.

== World War One and the 'Hay Plan' ==
After publishing The Amazing Emperor Heliogabalus in 1911, Hay decided to once again return to Catholicism in 1912 and stayed in the Catholic Church for the rest of his life. He made friends with significant figures within the Church and, during the war, attempted to use his friendships to turn the tide of Irish conscription, although damaging his prospects in the British military at the same time.

Hay joined the newly formed British Intelligence Corps on 9 September 1914 and was awarded the rank of Lieutenant. The Intelligence Corps awarded Hay a temporary commission under a condition known as “Temporary Gentleman”, a derogatory term placed upon temporary officers by their more experienced comrades. These “TGs” have undergone little training as the commissions were awarded on a merit-based approach or, in the case of Hay, by the needs of the service.

The Intelligence Corps was only founded in August 1914 by an initial cadre of fifty officers. Initially, the Corps was designed as a small force to accompany the British Expeditionary Force to France. It collected information on enemy movements and coordinated observations from the air. The Corps was then expanded for the first time in September 1914. The cadre included Hay, who was a valuable asset for information-gathering purposes, due to his ability to understand German, French, Italian, and Greek.

Hay's medal records indicate that he served on the Western Front during the war and was most likely involved in collecting information on enemy movements. By 1918, Hay was promoted to captain and attached to the Department of Information under English press Baron Lord Northcliffe.

=== The Hay Plan ===
On 20 July 1918, Hay received an order from William Sutherland, Lloyd George's Parliamentary Private Secretary, a member of the House of Commons who acted as the “eyes and ears” for the Prime Minister. This order, which came from David Lloyd George, was used by Hay to devise a plan to persuade Irish nationalists to volunteer to join the French Army as a way out of the conscription crisis that Ireland was undergoing in 1918.

The Irish conscription crisis was the British government's attempt to impose conscription in Ireland as a solution to the manpower crisis that Britain was undergoing during the end of the war. This proposal encountered widespread backlash in Ireland and caused multiple strikes and demonstrations against Lloyd George's government. Therefore, the Hay plan attempted to defuse this anti-war and anti-conscription sentiment by employing the Catholic Church and implying that it was an Irish Catholic's duty to the Church and to God to serve in the French Army. It was believed that by suggesting the French Army, an organisation with significant Catholic links, instead of the British one, Irish men would be more willing to serve in the war. Hay was likely chosen to devise this plan due to his being an Ordained Catholic priest who had significant connections to Cardinal Logue, who at the time was the prelate of the Irish branch of the Church.

On 22 July, Hay met with Lloyd George to propose his plan. He would propose this plan to Cardinal Logue through Sir Fredrick Shaw, a British General. The latter commanded an Irish division and thus had significant attachments to Ireland to cover the plan's origins being from Westminster. The plan suggested that Irish men would join the French army as labourers first and then later transition to a combat role and that by placing a non-combat role on the table, more Irish men would be willing to serve. Hay then travelled to France to meet with the French Minister of the Armed Forces, George Clemenceau, to convince him of the plan. At this stage, the British ambassador to France, George Stanley, started to question Hay's authority to go directly to Clemenceau, and it was at this point that the plan started to fall apart. The British government could not risk news of this plan being leaked out and therefore acted swiftly to cover up the plan and remove Hay from service. On 15 August 1918, Hay was ordered to go for a complete medical and was immediately removed from the service on being found medically unfit for duty.

If it had gone ahead, the implications of the Hay plan for the war effort and potentially the course of the Irish national movement would have been significant. The Hay plan encouraged another new 100,0000 - 200,000 men to join the war effort in the French army and helped reassure the French army that it could continue the fight. The plan also helped Lloyd George's government silence internal calls for conscription amongst cabinet members. That being said, the Irish nationalist movement benefited the most from the Hay's plan. Cardinal Logue and the Catholic Church were in favour of a united Ireland, and Cardinal Amette, a senior French Archbishop, stated to Logue that if “Ireland will give invaluable help to our just and great cause [France] will give herself a new right to the esteem of France and the Civilised World.” This sentiment implied that if Ireland supported France through the Hay plan, France would put its weight behind support for a united Ireland. The threat of a united Irish national movement under the Catholic Church could be a reason for Lloyd George to stop the Hay plan even without the ambassador to France's imposition. Thus, the plan doomed to fail from its origin point.

== Later life ==
Hay's post-war career was spent in Greece, and not much is known about his life there. Mentions of him come from the diaries of Robert Byron, an English travel writer, who invited Hay to join him on an Exhibition to Mount Athos in the summer of 1927. Bryon's diaries contained substantial photographic and written records of the trip. It is from this source that the first pictures of Hay have been identified.

Robert Byron also went to Oxford and has been credited with developing travel writing into the form it is today. In his 1927 book, The Station, Byron explores Mount Athos, a Greek Island which only men are allowed to visit, alongside Hay and other companions. Byron's The Station was a landmark piece of travel literature that gave Edwardian Britain one of its first looks at the famously isolationist island monastery. According to Robert Byron, Hay accompanied him on the trip to Mount Athos in order to buy “treasures” from the Monks so he could later sell them to British and American collectors. Although Byron mentions that Hay was working for the British Museum during this trip, the Museums archives were unable to verify this claim. Hay's understanding of Greek was also helpful as he acted as the translator for the party and helped to arrange accommodation during his travels.

Hay's career in Athens is not known after the entry in Byron's diaries. His death certificate states that he died from myocarditis on 27 April 1949 at the age of 62. It also mentions that he remained of the Catholic faith throughout the rest of his life and was self-employed when he died. He died without any family in Greece.

== Works ==
- Hay. John Stuart. The Amazing Emperor Heliogabalus. London: Macmillian, 1911.
- Hay, John Stuart. "The Ethics of Trimalcion's Dinner Party." The New Age 6, no.25(1911):586-587.
- Hay, John Stuart. "The Greatness of the Caesar." The New Age 7, no.18(1911):430.
- Hay, John Stuart. "The Tercentenary Celebrations of the 1611 Bible." The New Age 8, no.22(1911):514.
