= Shuttleworth, Greater Manchester =

Hamlet in Greater Manchester, England

Coordinates: 53.653°N 2.294°W

Shuttleworth
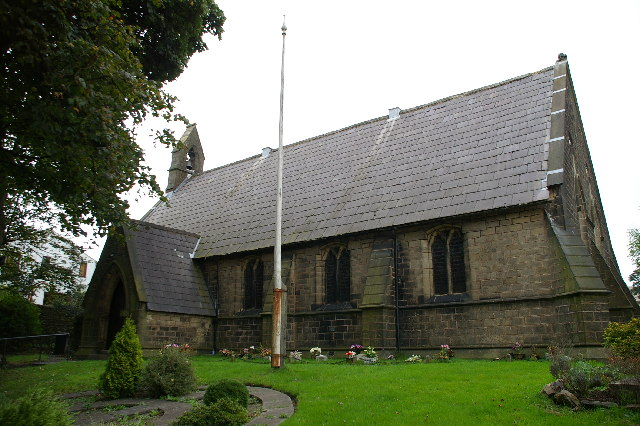
- St John's Church, Shuttleworth

- Location within Greater Manchester
- OS grid reference: SD805175
  - London: 174 mi (280 km) SSE
- Metropolitan borough: Bury
- Metropolitan county: Greater Manchester
- Region: North West
- Country: England
- Sovereign state: United Kingdom
- Post town: BURY
- Postcode district: BL0
- Dialling code: 01706
- Police: Greater Manchester
- Fire: Greater Manchester
- Ambulance: North West
- UK Parliament: Bury North

Shuttleworth is a hamlet at the northeastern extremity of the Metropolitan Borough of Bury, in Greater Manchester, England. It lies amongst the South Pennines, 4.3 miles (6.9 km) north of Bury and 0.9 miles (1.4 km) south of Edenfield; Scout Moor Wind Farm lies to the immediate east. Effectively a suburb of Ramsbottom, the M66 motorway divides Shuttleworth from the main core of that town.

Historically a part of Lancashire, the name Shuttleworth derives from the Old English scyttels and worth meaning a gated enclosure. The first element refers to a bar. It was documented as Suttelsworth in 1227 and Shuttelesworthe in 1296.

From the Middle Ages, Shuttleworth lay within the township of Walmersley (sometimes called Walmersley-cum-Shuttleworth) in the ancient parish of Bury, and hundred of Salford. Walmersley-cum-Shuttleworth was made a civil parish in 1866. From 1883 the Shuttleworth area was administered as part the local government district of Ramsbottom, with the parish boundary between Walmersley-cum-Shuttleworth and Ramsbottom being adjusted to match the local government district boundary in 1894.

Shuttleworth is bounded to the south by Holcombe Brook and Summerseat; to the north by Edenfield, Irwell Vale; to the west by Holcombe and Ramsbottom and to the east by Stubbins, Turn Village and Shuttleworth-cum-Turn.

In the 1990s, Manchester drag queen Foo Foo Lammar lived in Shuttleworth.
