= Arthur Smith (footballer, born 1915) =

English footballer (1915–2021)

Personal information
- Full name: Arthur Hoyle Smith
- Date of birth: 8 May 1915
- Place of birth: Walmersley, England
- Date of death: 21 August 2021 (aged 106)
- Place of death: Bolton, England
- Height: 5 ft 9 in (1.75 m)
- Position: Winger

Youth career
- 1934: Bury

Senior career*
| Years | Team | Apps | (Gls) |
| 1934–1938 | Bury | 4 | (0) |
| 1938–1939 | Leicester City | 10 | (2) |
| Total | | 14 | (2) |
- * Club domestic league appearances and goals

Arthur Hoyle Smith BEM (8 May 1915 – 21 August 2021) was an English professional footballer. At age 106 he was, at the time of his death, the oldest living former professional Football League player.

== Career ==
Smith's career started with Bury, where he signed as an amateur in November 1934. The following month, he made his debut for the club against Notts County, and turned out for the club three more times over the course of the 1934–35 season. In September 1935, Smith signed for Bury as a professional, but found himself playing regularly for the reserve side. As a result, he did not feature for the first team again, and in 1938, he joined Leicester City on a free transfer.

Smith's time at Leicester was brief, owing to the outbreak of the Second World War. In his first season with Leicester, he made eight appearances, and in his second, he made two more, with a brace against Manchester City. In the 1940–41 Wartime League, Smith then made five more appearances for the club, and although he was registered with Leicester until 1946, he never played another match for them.

From 1935 to 2015 (with the exception of five years' war service in the British Army), Smith was the organist and choirmaster at Christ Church, Walmersley. Because of his dedication to the church, he was awarded the British Empire Medal in the 2013 New Year Honours. He retired as organist on his 100th birthday. Smith died in Bolton in August 2021 at the age of 106.
