= Hail Storm Hill =

Hill in Lancashire, England

Coordinates: 53.66991°N 2.25122°W

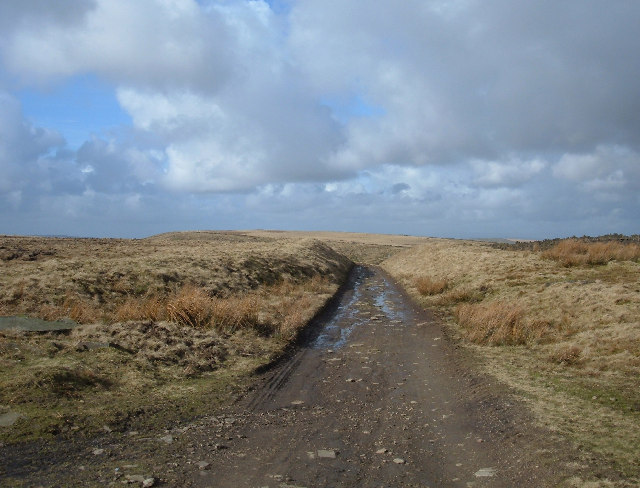
- The Pennine Bridleway just to the north of the summit

Highest point
- Elevation: 477 m (1,565 ft)
- Prominence: 244 m (801 ft)
- Parent peak: Boulsworth Hill
- Listing: Marilyn

Geography
- Location within Lancashire Location within the Borough of Rossendale
- Location: Lancashire, England
- OS grid: SD835193
- Topo map: OS Landranger 103

Hail Storm Hill, also known as Cowpe Moss, is the highest point of the Rossendale Valley, England, an area of moorland and hill country situated between the West Pennine Moors and the South Pennines. It is wholly within Lancashire, although the administrative county boundary with the Metropolitan Borough of Rochdale passes just a kilometre to the south-east of the summit.

Scout Moor Wind Farm now spans Hail Storm Hill.

The Forest of Rossendale also contains the Marilyn of Freeholds Top and the summit of Great Hameldon.

== Ascents ==
The shortest route to the summit is from the village of Cowpe just to the north, a journey of just over two miles (3 km) there and back that involves about 600 feet (180 m) of climb. Another option is from the road summit of the A680 at Turf Moor to the south-west, 3.5 miles (5.6 km) long with 500 feet (150 m) of climb. The hill can also be climbed from Rawtenstall to the north-west.

The hill is crossed by three long-distance footpaths: the Pennine Bridleway passes just to the north of the summit, the Rossendale Way goes over the western shoulder and the Rochdale Way passes over Knowl Moor two miles (3 km) to the south.
