= Rawtenstall Corporation Tramways =

Tramway in Lancashire, England

Operation
- Locale: Rawtenstall, Lancashire, England
- Open: 1 October 1908
- Close: 31 March 1932
- Status: Closed

Infrastructure
- Track gauge: 4 ft (1,219 mm)
- Propulsion system: Electric

Statistics
- Route length: 11.75 miles (18.91 km)

Rawtenstall Corporation Tramways was a passenger tramway service in Rawtenstall, Lancashire, England, operated between 1908 and 1932.

== History ==
In January 1908 the newly formed Rawtenstall Corporation Tramways acquired the part of the Accrington Corporation Steam Tramways Company’s line within its boundary, and on 1 October 1908, they took over the Rossendale Valley Tramways Company.

An electrification and modernisation programme was undertaken, and until this was ready on 22 July 1909, steam trams continued to run. This was the last regular steam tramway on street in Britain.

The first electric services started on 15 May 1909, to Crawshawbooth and to Loveclough. On 23 July 1909, the Bacup to Lockgate section was converted. Lastly, an extension to Water, from the Bacup line at Waterfoot opened on 21 January 1911.

For maximum electrical efficiency RCT used the regenerative brake system of Raworth's Traction Patents Ltd., but following a serious accident in 1911 an embargo was placed on this form of traction; although reintroduced 20 years later.

== Fleet ==
- 1-16 United Electric Car Company 1907
- 17-24 United Electric Car Company 1912
- 25-32 Brush of Loughborough 1922

== Closure ==
In 1928, a joint enterprise bus service was started by Accrington, Haslingden and Rawtenstall corporations, following the tram route from Bacup to Accrington. This resulted in a decision in 1929, to abandon the tram service.

In 1931 the tram service to Loveclough was withdrawn, and on 31 March 1932 the same happened to the route to Water. A closing ceremony took place on 7 April 1932.

Tramcar 23 from 1912 survives and is awaiting restoration at the Heaton Park Tramway.
