= Turn Village =

Coordinates: 53.660°N 2.289°W

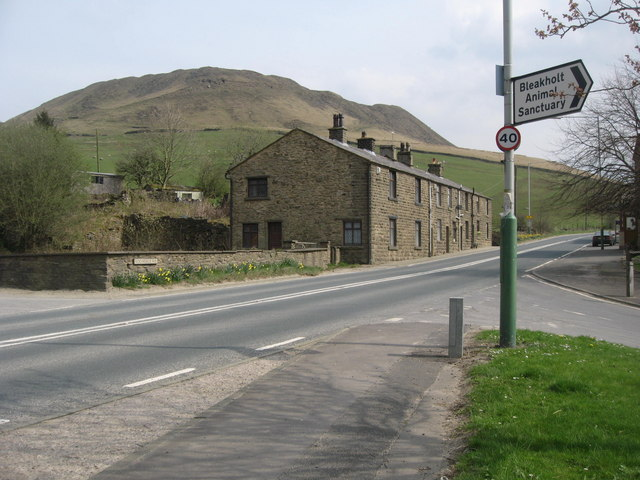
- Rochdale Road in 2007

- Location within Rossendale Location within Lancashire
- OS grid reference: SD809182
- District: Rossendale
- Shire county: Lancashire
- Region: North West
- Country: England
- Sovereign state: United Kingdom
- Post town: BURY
- Postcode district: BL0
- Dialling code: 01706
- Police: Lancashire
- Fire: Lancashire
- Ambulance: North West
- UK Parliament: Rossendale and Darwen

Turn Village is a hamlet in the Rossendale borough of Lancashire, England. It is located in the South Pennines, on the A680 road between Edenfield and Norden. Population details are included in Ramsbottom.

The surrounding moorland is the site for Scout Moor Wind Farm, the second largest onshore wind farm in England, which remains popular with paragliders.

The village is home to Bleakholt Animal Sanctuary and the Fisherman's Retreat restaurant.
