= Lauren Bowker =

English designer

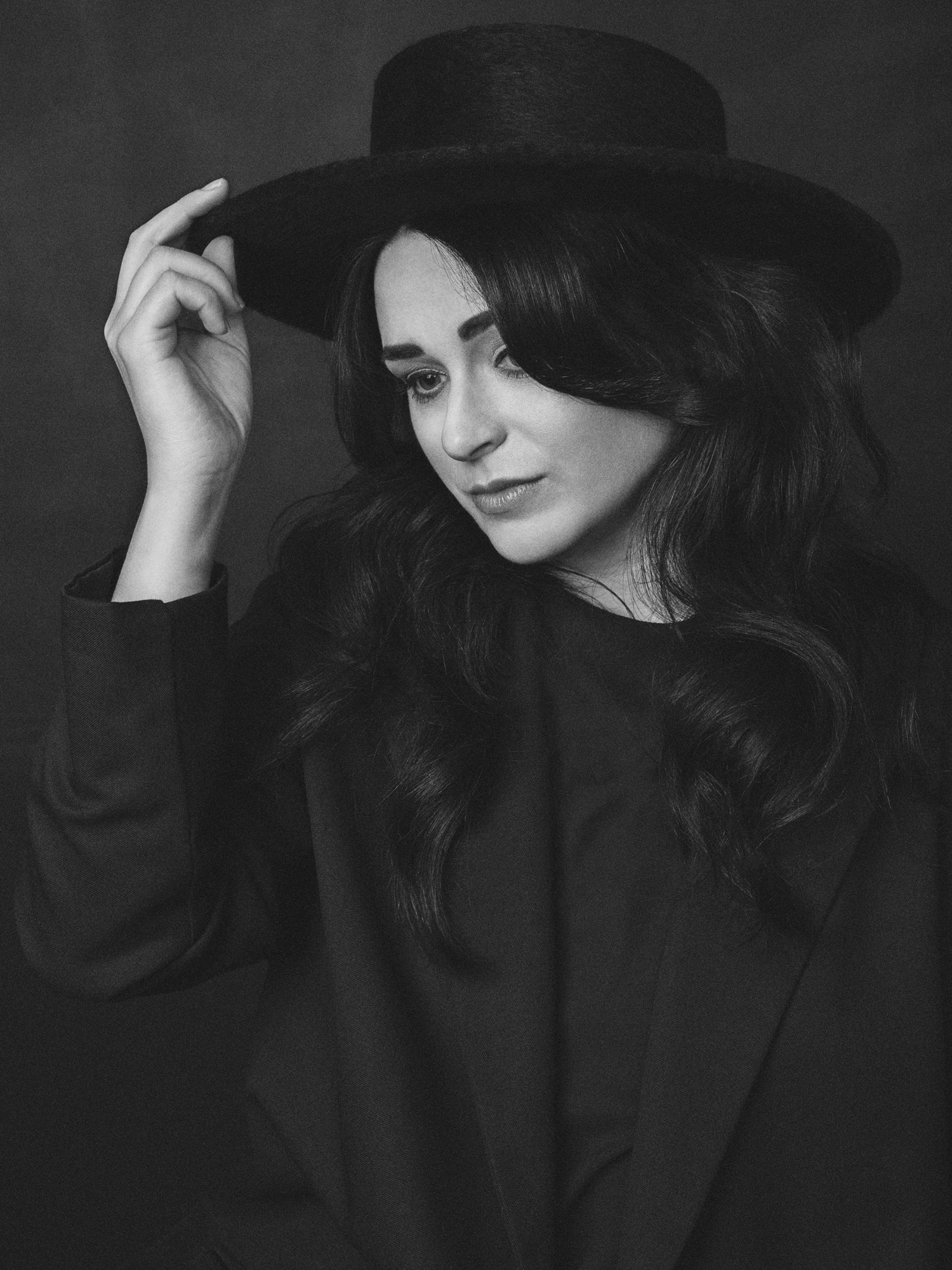
- Bowker dressed in black holding hat
- Born: September 16, 1985 (age 41); Rossendale, Lancashire
- Occupation: Designer

Lauren Bowker (born 16 September 1985) is an English designer, particularly known for her colour-change inks. Born in Rossendale, Lancashire, Bowker now resides in London, United Kingdom.

Bowker is a designer, inventor, director and speaker who works with museums, galleries, institutes and industries across the world, specialising in material science and design. Bowker is the founder and creative director of THEUNSEEN, a material innovation research and development house that develops intelligent materials using colour to visualise data.

She is also the inventor of a number of colour-change inks and compounds, launched an environment-responsive colour change fashion collection into Selfridges department store in October 2015, and is one of the creators of her own version of color changing hair dye "FIRE" in January 2017. In June 2017, Bowker presented a T-Shirt range responsive to climate change at the UN Nature summit on World Environment Day in Washington.

Bowker is editor at large of science for Dazed, a Creative Review creative leader and winner of the most innovative brand award at the WGSN Futures award 2016.

Bowker's skin-based beauty products are set to be launched in 2019. The products include, Atmo Spheres, a colour pigment for the cheeks, eyes, lips and skin that changes when it comes into contact with heat, a breeze or seasonal temperature changes; Soul Shades, a skin-accentuating blusher that responds to skin's natural temperature fluctuations; and Helio Veil, a self-forming freckle base activated by UV rays.

In 2026, Bowker launched Exist, a skincare brand developed around space-age biotechnology and ingredients studied for their resilience in extreme environments.
