= Jeff Whalley =

English footballer (1952–2018)

Personal information
- Full name: Jeffrey Hugh Whalley
- Date of birth: 8 February 1952
- Place of birth: Rossendale Valley, England
- Date of death: 23 February 2018 (aged 66)
- Place of death: Blackburn, England
- Position: Left winger

Senior career*
Years	Team	Apps	(Gls)
1969–1972	Blackburn Rovers	2	(0)
1974	Sydney Croatia	20	(2)
Total		22	(2)
- * Club domestic league appearances and goals

Jeffrey Hugh Whalley (8 February 1952 – 23 February 2018) was an English professional footballer who played in the Football League as a left winger.
