= Whitewell Brook =

River in Lancashire, England

Coordinates: 53.7177°N 2.2489°W

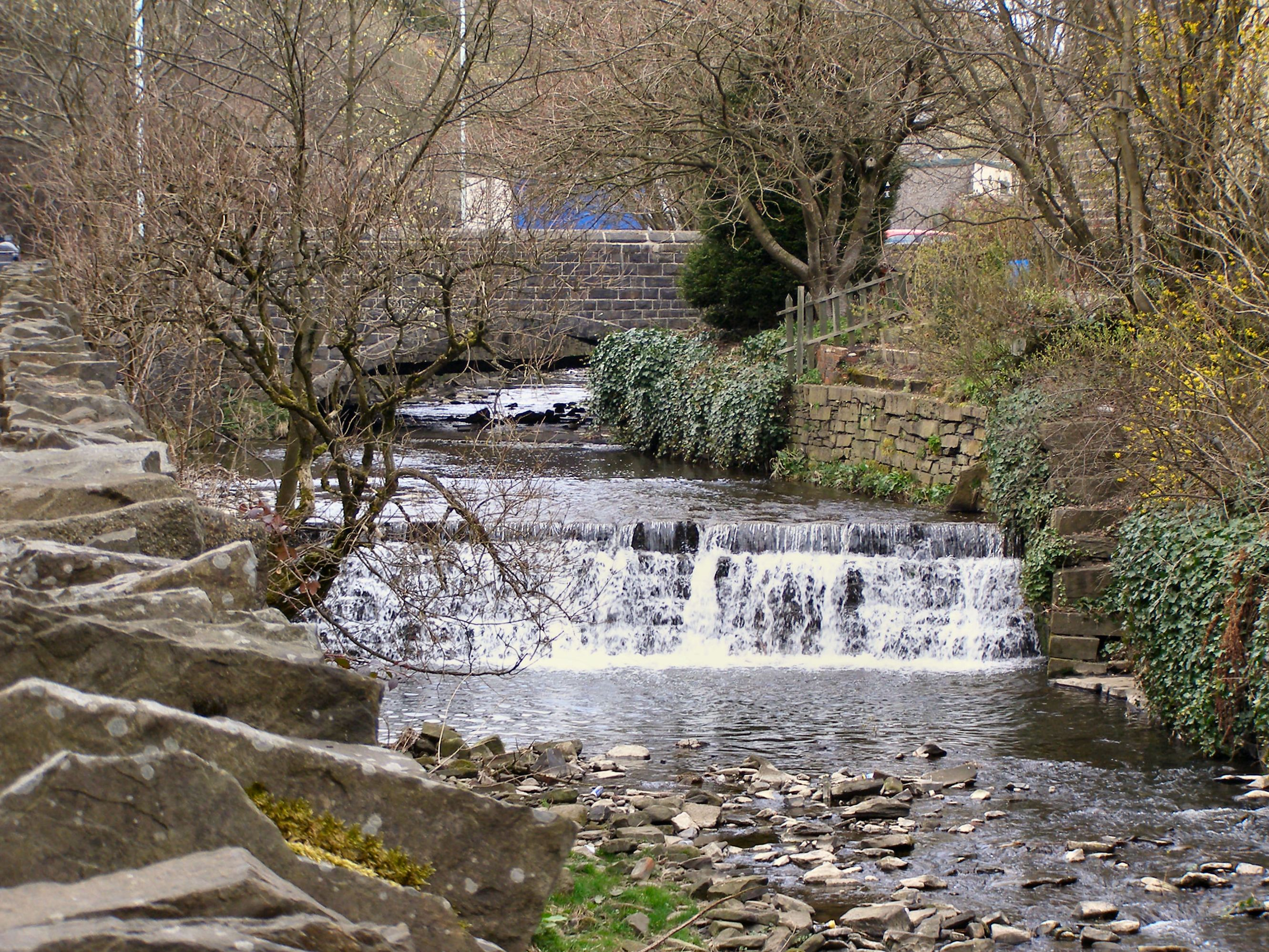
Whitewell Brook at Waterfoot in 2010

Whitewell Brook is a minor river in Lancashire, England. It is 4.34 miles (6.99 km) long and has a catchment area of 7.67 square miles (19.86 km^{2}).

The stream rises on Deerplay Moor in Cliviger near Burnley and heads southwest, collecting Deerplay Hill Syke as it crosses the A671 Burnley Road and then feeds into the Clough Bottom Reservoir. After exiting the reservoir it crosses Burnley Road East several times as it continues generally southwest. In the hamlet of Water it is met by Shepherd Clough and shortly after Cunliffe Clough. Nearby at Forest Holme it is joined by Heb Clough and it continues through the villages of Lumb and Whitewell Bottom where it collects Shaw Clough Brook. As it enters Waterfoot it turns to the south, passing through the centre of the town where it joins the River Irwell.

Next confluence upstream	River Irwell	Next confluence downstream
-	Whitewell Brook	Limy Water (North)
