= Fred Smith (footballer, born 1898) =

English footballer

Personal information
- Full name: Frederick Smith
- Date of birth: 26 November 1898
- Place of birth: Waterfoot, Lancashire, England
- Date of death: 1971 (aged 72–73)
- Height: 5 ft 9 in (1.75 m)
- Position: Full back

Senior career*
Years	Team	Apps	(Gls)
1919–1921	Rossendale United	69	(3)
1921–1932	Bury	116	(4)
1932–????	Ashton National		
- Hurst
- * Club domestic league appearances and goals

Frederick Smith (26 November 1898 – 1971) was an English footballer who played at full back for Bury in the Football League in the 1920s and 1930s. He also played non-league football for Rossendale United, Ashton National and Hurst.
