= Baxenden railway station =

English railway station from 1848 to 1961

Baxenden
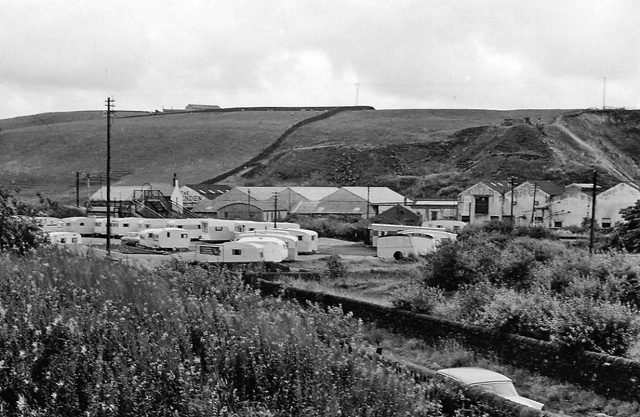
- The site of the station in 1963

General information
- Location: Baxenden, Hyndburn; England
- Coordinates: 53.7270°N 2.3401°W
- Platforms: 2

Other information
- Status: Disused

History
- Original company: East Lancashire Railway
- Pre-grouping: Lancashire and Yorkshire Railway
- Post-grouping: London, Midland and Scottish Railway

Key dates
- 17 August 1848: Opened
- 10 September 1951: Closed to passengers
- 6 February 1961: Closed to goods
Location

Baxenden railway station served the villages of Baxenden in Hyndburn and Rising Bridge in Rossendale. It was situated just inside the old boundary of Haslingden on the line from Bury Bolton Street to Accrington, which was opened in 1848 by the East Lancashire Railway. The station gave its name to the nearby Baxenden Bank, the two-mile section towards Accrington that included gradients as steep as 1 in 38.

The Accrington Corporation Steam Tramways Company built a tramline from Accrington in 1887 that terminated at the station. The station closed to passengers in 1951, some fifteen years before the line serving it suffered a similar fate.

| Preceding station | Disused railways | Following station |
|---|---|---|
| Accrington | Lancashire and Yorkshire Railway; East Lancashire Railway | Haslingden |
