= Andrew Houston =

Irish writer (1850-1920)

Andrew Houston (20 March 1850 – September 1920 ) was born in Doonbreeda, Nephin, County Mayo; later moving to Rossendale, credited as the Rossendale Bard.

== Life ==
Andrew Houston was a Rossendale Irishman, the author of a book of Poems and Songs (many of which had appeared previously in the Rossendale Free Press) published in 1912 and printed by J. J. Riley of Rawtenstall. Andrew Houston was born on 20 March 1850 in the village of Doonbreeda at the foot of Nephin Hill, West Mayo.

His father was a village school-master in Rathkeale and was well known in County Mayo as a writer of verses and songs. Andrew left Ireland and came to live at Newchurch-in-Rossendale when he was eleven years old and he worked in the local mills until 1880 when he became a commercial traveller. He eventually moved to Derbyshire but he loved to visit Rossendale of his adolescent years, and "camp" his old friends.

In the preface of his book Poems and Songs, S. A. Sutcliffe of Southport describes him as a man who had a well-contented look and a jolly eye and who was fond of ease and freedom. From his writings it can be seen that he liked people and liked to roam over the moors of the Rossendale area and had deep affection for both the Valley and his old Irish home.

He pays tribute to the friendliness of Bacup folk in his poem "Bonny Owd Bacup" and many old Rossendalians live on in his pages—Mr. Terry, the schoolmaster, Turn o’ Mary's, owd navvy Jackson, and Ormy Deighn and other members of the old Edgeside Drum and Fife Band, to mention a few. His song Molly Magee evokes memories of the summers before the First World War when the Irish haymakers, experts with the scythe and hard workers, came over every year to work for the local farmers. He wrote more than a hundred poems and songs.

== Publications ==
- Poems and Songs (1912)
