= Whit Cunliffe =

English comic singer

- Born: Whittaker Cunliffe; 15 December 1875; Waterfoot, Lancashire, England
- Died: 1 May 1966 (aged 90); Battle, East Sussex
- Occupation: Comic singer

Whittaker Cunliffe (15 December 1875 – 1 May 1966) was an English comic singer. The historian and critic W. J. MacQueen-Pope described Cunliffe as a "great singer of great songs and the epitome of what made Music Hall."

== Biography ==
Whit Cunliffe was born in Waterfoot, Lancashire. By 1900 he was performing in music halls. He was described as being "a bit of a dandy", strolling around the stage dressed in a frock coat, top hat and spats, and was referred to as the last surviving Lion comique.

Among his most successful songs was "There Are Nice Girls Everywhere" (1909). Several of his songs - most of which were written for him by writers such as R. P. Weston and Fred Godfrey - took a highly conservative view of women's roles, and particularly of the women's suffrage movement. They included "If the World Were Ruled by Girls" (1905), "It's a Different Girl Again" (1906), "Tight Skirts Have Got to Go", "Let's Have Free Trade Among the Girls", "They Can Do Without Us", and "Do You Believe in Women's Rights". He recorded other topical songs; his 1914 song "Tow the Row Row" laughs at the forced feeding in prison of suffragettes a couple of years earlier, and denounced the Social Insurance laws put in place by Lloyd George's government. Cunliffe was an enthusiastic supporter of the allied cause in the First World War and was involved in many concerts raising money to help the war drive. His 1914 song "Hock Hock Der Kaiser" made fun of German pretensions.

He recorded many of his songs between 1910 and 1915, including "There Are Nice Girls Everywhere", "There's Something in the Seaside Air", and "Who Were You With Last Night?", which had first been performed by Mark Sheridan. A selection of his songs was released on CD in 2003, as Tight Skirts Have Got To Go.

Cunliffe retired after the end of the First World War. He died in Battle, East Sussex, in 1966, aged 90.

== Other songs ==
- "I will! I won't! As Soon as the Girl Gets you Home" (wrote)
- "Women get the Best of it; Poor Old Father" (composer)
- "Hallo Hallo Hallo, It's a Different Girl Again!"
