= Llandudno and Colwyn Bay Electric Railway =

Tramway company in Wales

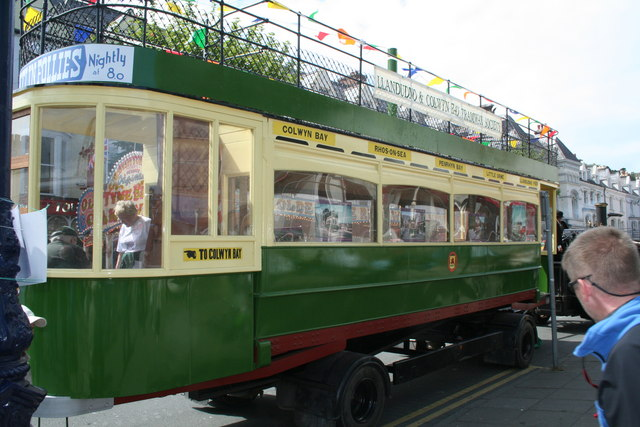
- A car body rebuilt by the preservation society

Operation
- Locale: Llandudno Colwyn Bay
- Open: 19 October 1907
- Close: 24 March 1956
- Status: Closed

Infrastructure
- Track gauge: 3 ft 6 in (1,067 mm)
- Propulsion system: Electric

Statistics
- Route length: 8 miles (13 km)

The Llandudno and Colwyn Bay Electric Railway operated an electric tramway service between Llandudno and Rhos-on-Sea from 1907 and extended to Colwyn Bay in 1908. The service closed in 1956.

== History ==
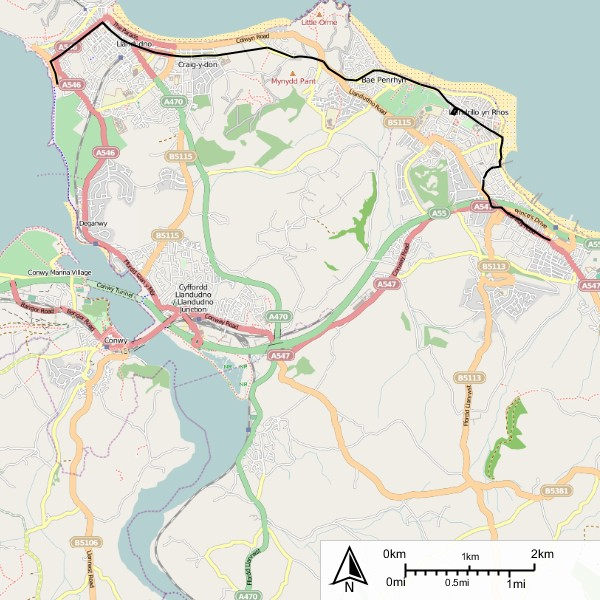
Map of the route of the Llandudno and Colwyn Bay Electric Railway

The Llandudno and Colwyn Bay Light Railway Order 1898 authorised the construction of a tramway from Colwyn Bay to Deganwy. There were substantial delays in construction and only a short section of line had been built by 1904. The original company was taken over in July 1906 by the Llandudno and District Electric Construction Company.

Work restarted in 1907 and the line from Llandudno to Rhos-on-Sea was soon ready. On 26 September 1907 the company got permission for services to start, and it opened on 19 October 1907. The section of line to Colwyn Bay, top of Station Road was completed by 7 June 1908 and the final extension to Old Colwyn was opened in 1915. In 1913 the Gloddaeth Avenue (West Shore) to Dale Road was abandoned and the Colwyn Bay - Old Colwyn section was closed in September 1930, being cut back to Abergele Road/Greenfield Road corner on the (then) A55.

== Fleet ==
The company livery was red and cream until the late 1920s when it changed to green and cream.

- 1-14 Midland Railway Carriage and Wagon Company 1907.
- 15-18 United Electric Car Company 1909
- 19-22 English Electric 1920
- 23(1) Formerly from Taunton then Leamington tramways, it was bought in 1930 for use as a works car.
- 23(2) Purchased from Bournemouth as a railgrinder/works car 1936. Re-numbered 23A when the trams from Darwen trams entered service in June 1948.
- 23-24 English Electric 1946 (second hand from Darwen Corporation Tramways)
- The original cars of 1907 and 1909 were replaced progressively between 1933 and 1936 by five second hand vehicles from Accrington Corporation Tramways, taking fleet numbers 1 - 5. The remainder, which were not withdrawn in numerical order, with the exception of three which took new numbers 16, 17 & 18, were replaced by ten ex Bournemouth Corporation Tramways open-top double decker trams. These were numbered 6 - 15 at Llandudno. Bournemouth works car, No 55, was also purchased in 1936 for use as a rail grinder/works car. Of the original 1907 survivors, No16 caught fire in 1945 and was withdrawn. 17 and 18 survived until January 1956.

== Closure ==
The line suffered from substantial damage in storms in January 1952. Although repairs were carried out, storms the next year did as much damage again. In 1954 the company applied for a licence to convert the service to motor buses. Although the local councils objected, there was little that could be done and the line closed on 24 March 1956.

The Llandudno and Colwyn Bay Tramway Society has restored the body of ex-Bournemouth No126 ( as LCBER replica No7.)which is similar to ten ex Bournemouth trams which did operate on this tramway. (No126 never operated in Llandudno).
