= Larks of Dean =

English musicians (circa 1750 to 1850)

The Larks of Dean were a society of musicians formed in Rossendale, Lancashire. in northern England during the mid-eighteenth to the mid-nineteenth century. They were known in the local dialect as "Th' Deighn Layrocks".

== Background ==
Dean is a small community within the east Lancashire valley of Rossendale, near Water between Rawtenstall and Burnley, part of the area in which the textile industry expanded massively during the Industrial Revolution. In 1835 the Scottish writer George Hogarth noted 'In the densely populated manufacturing districts ... music is cultivated among the working classes to an extent unparalleled in any other part of the country', in his Musical History, referring to the industrialised parts of England. Soon after, in 1862 Edwin Waugh describing Manchester in the Cotton Famine mentions 'swarms of strange, shy, sad-looking singers and instrumental performers in the work-worn clothing of factory-operatives'. Making music provided one of the few ways to find relief from the hardship of working in the new mill factories of Lancashire. The Larks of Dean were one notable group of musicians that grew from this situation, as well as from the non-conformist religious background of the area.

== Chapels and music ==
Non-conformist religion had been an important feature of working-class life in Northern England since the evangelical awakening of the first part of the eighteenth century. As in many similar communities chapels were built throughout Rossendale during the following years. Influenced by the preacher John Nuttall a small Baptist chapel was built in 1750 and rebuilt later in Goodshaw in 1760. Nuttall was the minister until his death in 1792. Richard Hudson was another preacher working with Nuttall who was responsible for the religious music that was a feature of the worship. Goodshaw Chapel became a magnet for music. The group who called themselves The Larks of Dean carried their instruments over the rough moorland terrain every Sunday to perform in the chapel. The tradition flourished for a century until the Chapel closed in 1860.

== The music ==
There are well over a thousand psalm and hymn tunes collected together from the Larks of Dean. The earliest dated appears to be 1745, and the Rev. John Nuttall's two sons, James and Henry contributed most, with Henry composing about 100. Other composers were John Hargreaves, Reuben Hudson, Abraham and Robert Ashworth, and other members of the Nuttall family.

There are many stories of practices going into the early hours, even of Sunday sessions continuing into Monday. In addition to their own music, the Larks of Dean loved the music of George Handel. One member is said to have walked well over 20 miles just to look at a copy of Samson. Several members of the Larks of Dean were great characters. One remarkable member was Robert o' t'h Moss (Ashworth), and Thomas Newbigging tells the story of him playing a hornpipe on his cello; when an old deacon exclaimed "Robert, that's an idle tune", he replied, "There are no idle tunes."

Today the Larks of Dean Quire, based in Bury, Greater Manchester, continue this tradition, though their singing of hymns, psalms, anthems, and carols, is mostly performed unaccompanied, and they have their own Larks of Dean Quire website. A collection of instruments and manuscripts belonging to the original Larks of Dean are on display in Whitaker Park Museum, Rawtenstall.

== "Wandering Minstrels; or, Wails of the Workless Poor" ==
Dean is a small settlement about 3 miles due east of Goodshaw Chapel. The places are not connected by road, rather by several of the countless footpaths that criss-cross the moorlands of the area. These paths are exposed and high, potentially dangerous in the winter months. The musicians would have walked these paths to reach their place of worship and music-making. Edwin Waugh, in his 'Home-Life of the Lancashire Factory Folk during the Cotton Famine' gives a vivid but historically interesting insight into the lives of the Larks of Dean in the following passage:

"Up in the forest of Rosendale, between Deerply Moor and the wild hill called Swinshaw, there is a little lone valley, a green cup in the mountains, called "Dean." The inhabitants of this valley are so notable for their love of music, that they are known all through the vales of Rosendale as "Th' Deighn Layrocks," or "The Larks of Dean."

"In the twilight of a glorious Sunday evening, in the height of summer, I was roaming over the heathery waste of Swinshaw, towards Dean, in company with a musical friend of mine, who lived in the neighbouring clough, when we saw a little crowd of people coming down a moorland slope, far away in front of us. As they drew nearer, we found that many of them had musical instruments, and when we met, my friend recognised them as working people living in the district, and mostly well known to him. He inquired where they had been; and they told him that they had "bin to a bit ov a sing deawn i'th Deighn." "Well," said he, "can't we have a tune here?" "Sure, yo con, wi' o' th' plezzur i'th world," replied he who acted as spokesman; and a low buzz of delighted consent ran through the rest of the company. They then ranged themselves in a circle around their conductor, and they played and sang several fine pieces of psalmody upon the heather-scented mountain top."
