= Walmersley =

Coordinates: 53.6166°N 2.3°W

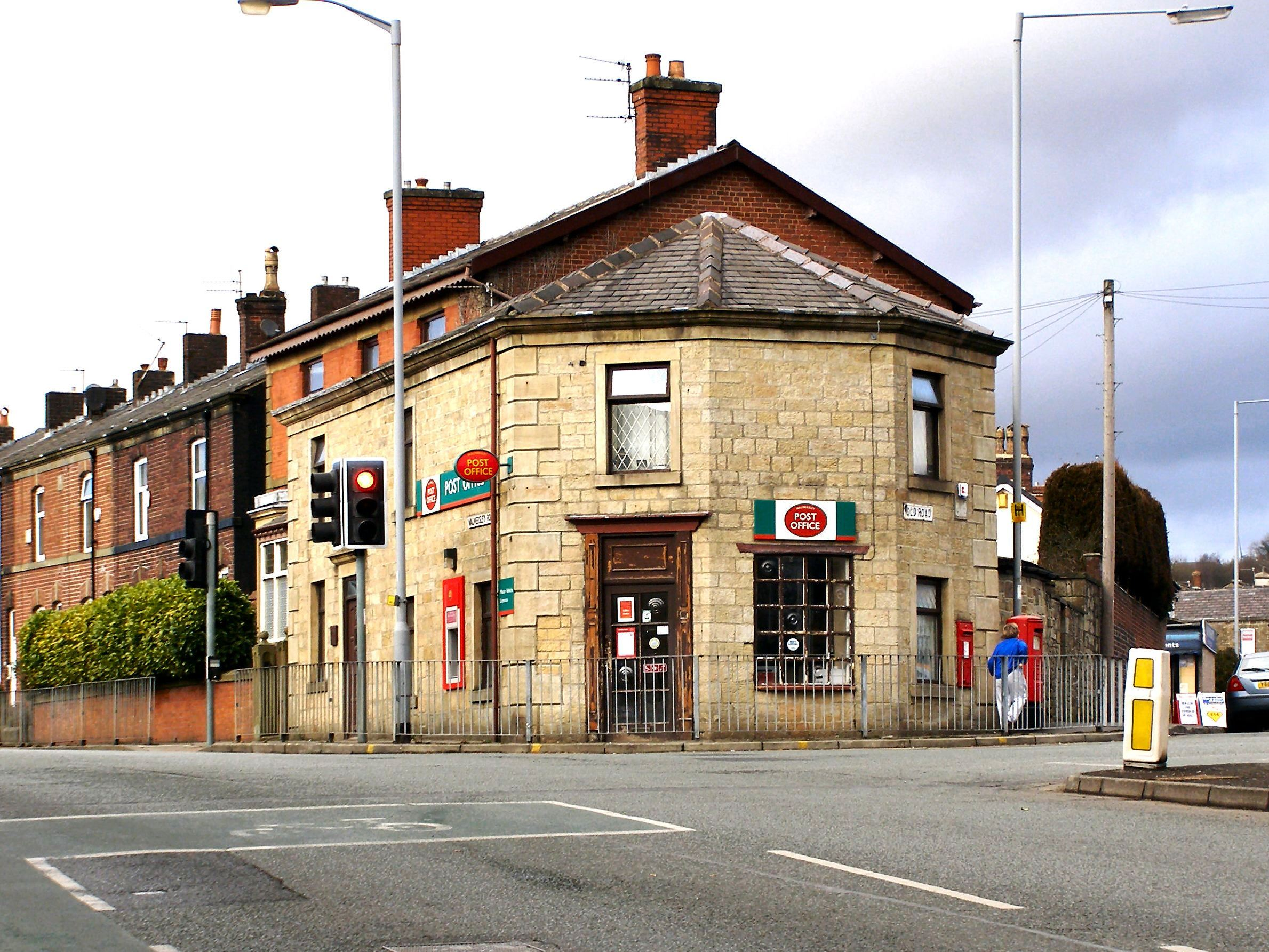
- Walmersley Post Office

- Location within Greater Manchester
- Metropolitan borough: Bury
- Metropolitan county: Greater Manchester
- Region: North West
- Country: England
- Sovereign state: United Kingdom
- Post town: BURY
- Postcode district: BL9
- Dialling code: 0161
- Police: Greater Manchester
- Fire: Greater Manchester
- Ambulance: North West
- UK Parliament: Bury North

Walmersley is a suburban village in the Metropolitan Borough of Bury, Greater Manchester, England.

== History ==
Historically in Lancashire, the name Walmersley is said to be derived from Old English, and translates as Waldmer's wood, or clearing.

Once a rural village in the wilds, in recent decades, it has become a northern suburb of Bury. Old stone cottages remain in the area, but much of the district's housing is of post-war construction.

The A56 (Walmersley Road) links Walmersley with Bury to the south and Shuttleworth, Ramsbottom and Edenfield to the north. Before this 'new' road was built the road north from Bury followed the line of Walmersley Old Road. The old 'coach road' went through Baldingstone and Nangreaves and onto Hardern Moor and beyond to Shuttleworth and Edenfield. Junctions led to the then thriving mills in Deeply Vale and Birtle Dene. Deeply Vale has more contemporary fame as the location of the Deeply Vale Festivals. The old road was one of the many roads in east Lancashire constructed by John Metcalf, perhaps better known as Blind Jack Metcalf, a civil engineer from Knaresborough.

The Walmersley conservation area was designated in November 2003. It covers Christ Church, its churchyard, the former school and school master's house, together with the adjacent Spur Petroleum site which contains the former Walmersley Brewery buildings. The whole site is an excellent record of a small but important part of Walmersley, and illustrates generally well preserved elements of stone built ecclesiastical and industrial architecture from the mid to late 19th century. Some of these buildings were severely damaged in a fire, suspected to have been deliberate by one party or another...this is disputed especially by those wanting to develop the land. New residential buildings have now been erected on the Spur site with the retention and reuse of some of the older buildings.

=== Administrative history ===
Walmersley was historically part of the ancient parish of Bury. The parish contained several townships, one of which was called "Walmersley cum Shuttleworth". This township became a civil parish in 1866. From 1872 the Walmersley area was included in the Bury improvement commissioners' district and from 1883 Shuttleworth was included in the Ramsbottom local government district. In 1894 the parish of Walmersley cum Shuttleworth was reduced to just cover the rural parts outside the two urban authorities, with Walmersley itself being added to the parish of Bury and Shuttleworth being added to Ramsbottom. The parish of Walmersley cum Shuttleworth after 1894 therefore did not include either of the villages included in its name. The parish was abolished in 1933, being added to Ramsbottom.

== Landmarks ==
Christ Church, Walmersley located on Walmersley Road. In 1838 the Walmersley ecclesiastical parish was formed by sub-dividing the ancient, larger Bury parish. A church was built beside what was then the 'new' road but in 1883 the present church, a neo-gothic design by Maxwell and Tuke was built. The east window of the first church was preserved and built into the new building. Amongst other buildings Maxwell & Tuke designed Blackpool Tower and, in 1894, the Technical School, Broad Street, Bury now housing the Fusilier Museum, which is dedicated to the Lancashire Fusiliers.

Baldingstone House, probably the oldest property in the area, was built in about 1615. In the 17th century the house was home of the Kay family. Indeed, it is believed the house was built by Richard Kay a blacksmith with a smithy at Baldingstone. Richard was married to Alice Kay, from Sheephey, Shuttleworth whose brother Robert was the father of John Kay, the inventor of the flying shuttle.
