= Water, Lancashire =

Hamlet in Lancashire, England

Coordinates: 53.728°N 2.240°W

Water
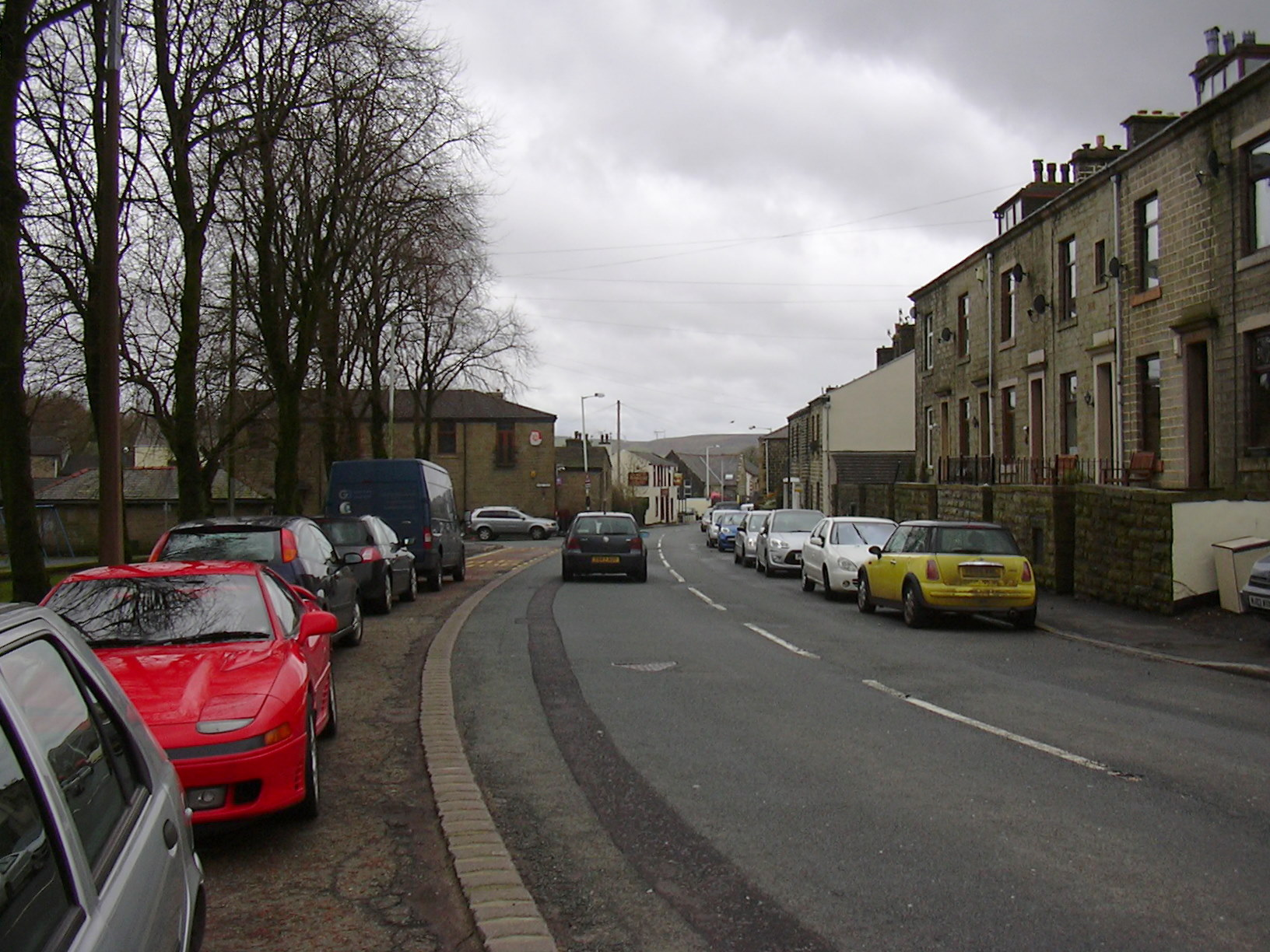
- Burnley Road East in Water, 2011

- Location within Rossendale Location within Lancashire
- Area: 0.2525 km^{2} (0.0975 sq mi)
- Population: 835 (2020 estimate)
  - Density: 3,307/km^{2} (8,570/sq mi)
- District: Rossendale
- Shire county: Lancashire
- Region: North West
- Country: England
- Sovereign state: United Kingdom
- Post town: ROSSENDALE
- Postcode district: BB4
- Dialling code: 01706
- Police: Lancashire
- Fire: Lancashire
- Ambulance: North West
- UK Parliament: Rossendale and Darwen

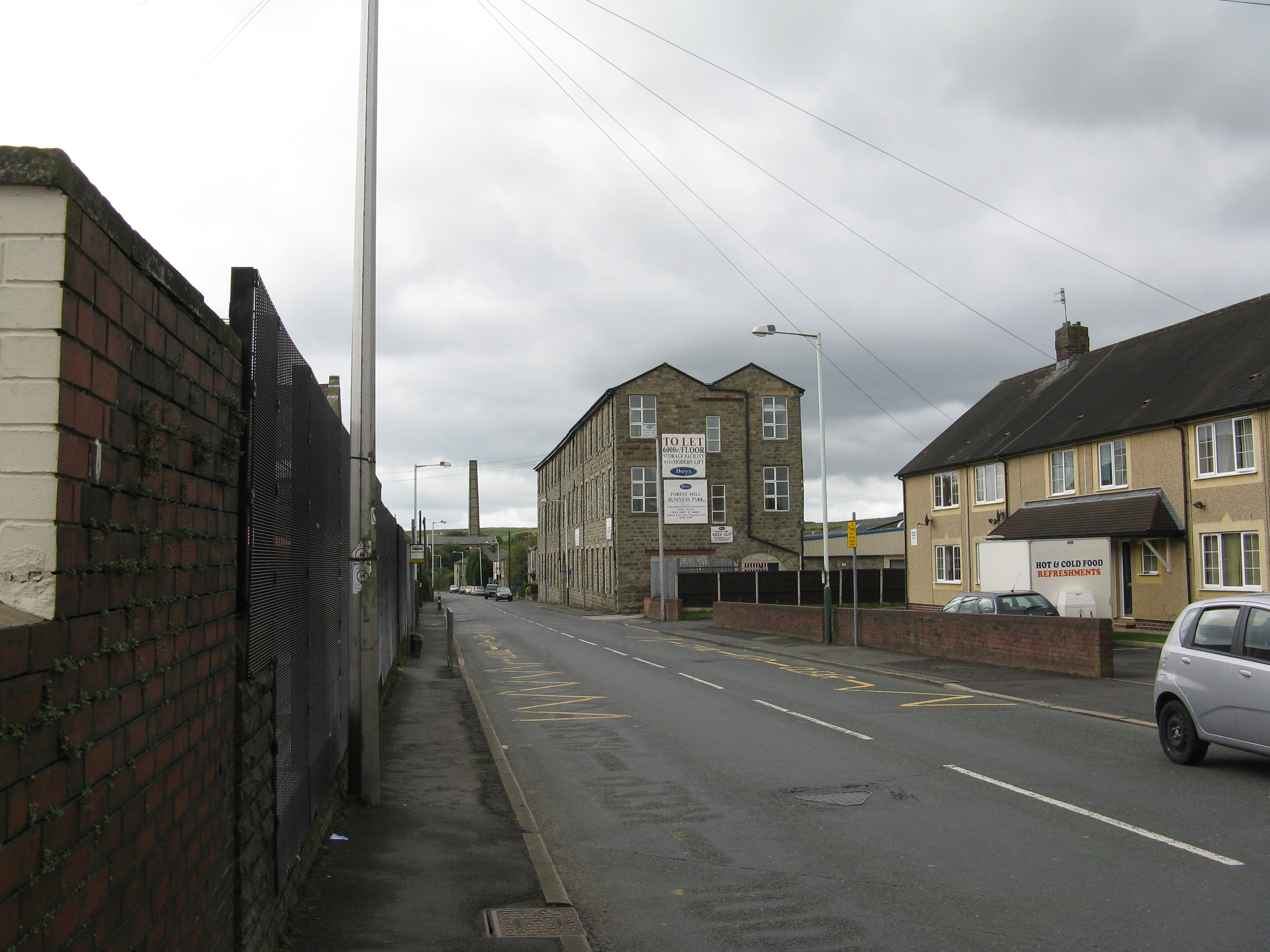
Burnley Road East in Water, 2011

Water is a hamlet in the borough of Rossendale, in Lancashire, England. Located north of the village of Lumb. It is mostly made of a few homes, farms, a bistro called the Water Trough, a primary school and industrial estates. In 2020, it had an estimated population of 835.
