= Accrington Corporation Steam Tramways Company =

British steam-powered tramway service

Operation
- Locale: Accrington
- Open: 5 April 1886
- Close: 31 December 1907
- Status: Closed

Infrastructure
- Track gauge: 4 ft (1,219 mm)
- Propulsion system: Steam
- Depot: Ellison Street

Statistics
- Route length: 7.02 miles (11.30 km)

Accrington Corporation Steam Tramways Company operated a steam-powered passenger tramway service in Accrington between 1886 and 1907.

== History ==
The Accrington Corporation Tramways Act 1882 authorised a joint venture between the corporation and a private company to construct tramways in Accrington. The infrastructure was leased by the corporation to the company for 21 years. Construction began two years later on a system of three routes:

- Blackburn Road to the 9 Hotel in Church – opened 5 April 1886
- Whalley Road to the ‘Load of Mischief' in Clayton-le-Moors – opened 5 April 1886
- Abbey Street and Manchester Road to Baxenden railway station – opened 12 June 1886

An extension to the Baxenden route to the Commercial Hotel Haslingden opened on 27 August 1887. In November 1887 the route was extended to the Haslingden/Rawtenstall boundary at Lockgate allowing services to Queens Square in Rawtenstall. The sections of track in Haslingden and Rawtenstall were owned by the respective corporations but leased to the company.

== Fleet ==
All of the locomotive engines were supplied by Thomas Green & Son. An initial order of 9 in 1885 was supplemented with further orders until the last order in 1898. Three second hand engines were obtained in 1901 from Blackburn Corporation which gave a total steam fleet of 22.

The initial fleet of 10 trailers were ordered from Falcon Engine & Car Works. Further trailers were acquired in subsequent years.

== Closure ==
Around 1899 the company entered into a provisional agreement with the British Electric Traction company for the latter to purchase the tramway.

However, in 1907, Accrington Corporation had formed Accrington Corporation Tramways and it purchased the system within its boundary for £2,227 (equivalent to £231,628 in 2025). The company maintained the steam trams service during the electrification project.

Eight locomotives and seven trailer cars were operated by Haslingden Corporation until 1908 between Baxenden and Lockgate.
