= Edenfield =

Village in Lancashire, England

Coordinates: 53.662°N 2.309°W

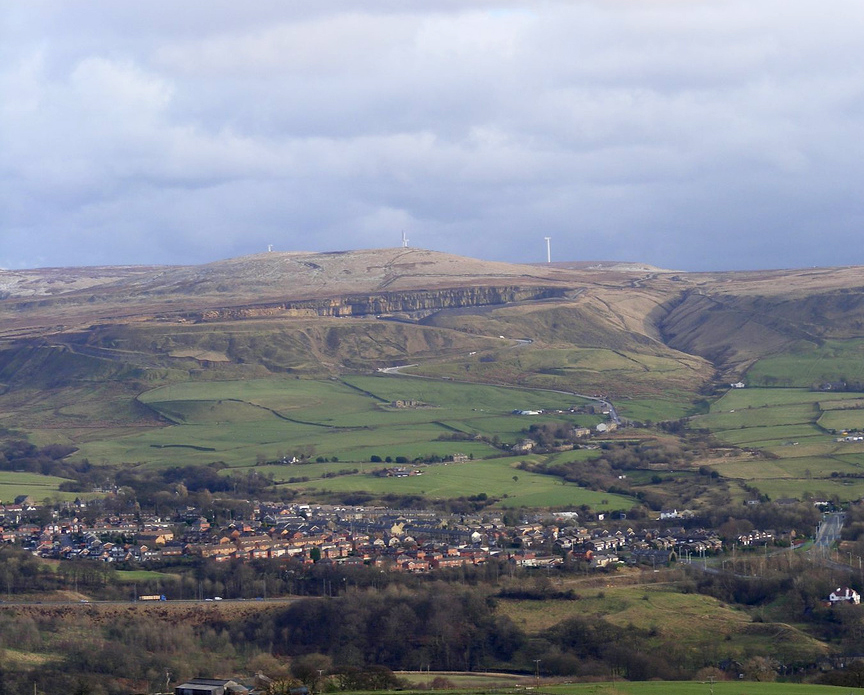
- A view over Edenfield towards Scout Moor in 2008

- Location within Rossendale Location within Lancashire
- Population: 2,053 (2011 census)
- OS grid reference: SD795185
  - London: 175.2 miles (282.6 km) SSE
- District: Rossendale
- Shire county: Lancashire
- Region: North West
- Country: England
- Sovereign state: United Kingdom
- Post town: BURY
- Postcode district: BL0
- Dialling code: 01706
- Police: Lancashire
- Fire: Lancashire
- Ambulance: North West
- UK Parliament: Rossendale and Darwen

Edenfield is a village in the Rossendale borough of Lancashire, England, on the River Irwell 1.25 miles (2.0 km) north of Ramsbottom, 2.5 miles (4.0 km) south of Rawtenstall, and 6.0 miles (9.7 km) west of Norden. At the 2011 census it had a population of 2,053.

Edenfield lies at the intersection of three A roads; the A676 from Bolton, the A680 from Accrington and Rochdale and the A56 from Rawtenstall and Bury. The M66 motorway terminates at Edenfield, where it becomes the A56 dual carriageway known as the Edenfield Bypass.

The village is a commuter settlement for Greater Manchester.

== History ==
The origins of the Edenfield place name are not entirely clear, but it seems extremely unlikely that it derives from "fields of Eden" or similar. Given the large number of Old Norse-derived place names in Rossendale and bearing in mind that documents from the 17th century and older spell the name as Aydenfield or some variant of this, a likely toponymy is the Old Norse "øy" (riverside ground/island; see for instance the village of Øyer) + "tun" (farmstead) + field; in other words, the land belonging to the farmstead by the river (Irwell).

Edenfield Chapel of Ease (the precursor of the parish church and part of the benefice of Bury) is extensively mentioned in 16th century documents. It probably had its own curate before the Reformation. A deed of 1564 mentions one Ralph Nuttall making payments to Richard Nuttall for a land settlement and that these payments were to take place "in Edenfield Chapel". A century later there were "aboute foure and twenty tenements and houses w th in Shuttleworth in the Lordshippe of Burghe [Bury], beinge all the houses w th in Shuttleworth afforesaid who are appointed by the said Orders to' pay theire tyths to Bury, who are much nearer to the Chapel of Aydenfield [Edenfield] afforesaid, and vsually repaire thither to the ordinances when they have a mister".

Like other villages in Rossendale, Edenfield later became involved in industry and some quarrying activities still continue.

Britain's second largest onshore wind farm was controversially built in 2007–08 on Scout Moor above Edenfield.

== Governance ==
Since 1974, Edenfield has formed part of the Rossendale borough of Lancashire, having previously formed part of the urban district of Ramsbottom, in the administrative county boundaries of Lancashire.

Edenfield is part of the Rossendale and Darwen Parliamentary Constituency, with the current MP being Andy MacNae of the Labour Party.

== Geography ==
Edenfield lies above the east bank of the River Irwell, within the Rossendale Valley. The landscape of the area is dominated by Dearden Moor and Scout Moor directly to the east and Holcombe Moor with the Peel Monument, across the valley of the River Irwell to the west. The M66 motorway terminates its course at Edenfield.

== Economy ==
The main thoroughfare in the village is Market Street, along which occurs mostly late 19th century terraced housing and a number of shops.

The number and type of shops in the village has varied over recent years, with an overall decline due to the increased mobility of the population and competition from nearby supermarkets, but mainstays have been an independent baker (Sixsmith's), butcher, pharmacy, post office, newsagent and fish and chip shop.

A number of mills sprang up during the Industrial Revolution from the 1760s onwards – not without the usual Luddite unrest. A once-famous 19th century novel refers to a character "who crossed the hills to preach at Edenfield on Sunday [saying] that machines were broken on Saturday". The mills, built particularly alongside Dearden Brook which provided the water power, are now closed but some remains can be seen in Dearden Clough.

That the main route north from Manchester runs through the village explains the many coaching houses, of which only two public houses survive – the Rostron Arms and the Coach. During the second half of the 19th century Edenfield had its own brewery, the products of which were not entirely popular: due to their purgative effect the ale was known as "Sh-t-n Br-ches". An article published in 1983 described a ghostly headless horseman who allegedly haunts the main road but this "legend" is not widely known elsewhere.

== Landmarks ==
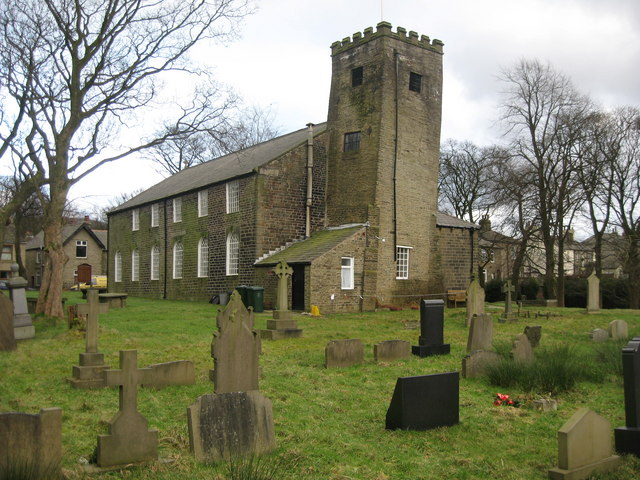
Edenfield parish church in 2007

The parish church is a simple but elegant 18th-century building unusual in that it takes its name from the village rather than being dedicated to a particular saint. Despite some 19th-century additions it was famously described by John Betjeman as "unspoiled, unspruced Georgian". It is Grade II listed. There is a 1970s photograph of the church, showing part of the main street, village school and the now-demolished Chapel House Farm, on the website of Edenfield-born musician Dr Tim Rishton, who was organist there as a child. The former Wesleyan Methodist chapel, on the junction between Market Street and Rochdale Road, was demolished in 1960, but there is still an imposing Primitive Methodist church, built in 1881 at the junction of Bond Street and Rochdale Road.

== Present day ==
The area is popular with walkers and hikers, many stopping to see Waugh's Well, a hillside memorial to the Lancashire Dialect writer and poet Edwin Waugh. Another popular walk is Dearden Clough to 'Plunge' – the ruined site of Plunge Mill, where there is an imposing pit wheel housing for a waterwheel. One approach to the clough is from Michael Wife Lane, named after Mary Nuttall, wife of Michael Nuttall, who was fined in 1618 for not maintaining the road and, finally, put in the stocks in 1624 for still not carrying out this work.

The village is home to Edenfield Cricket Club. There is also a recreation ground on Exchange Street which is used by a number of football teams of varying ages. Alongside is Edenfield Community Centre serving a number of uses for different interest groups. In May 2010 over 270 sheep, valued at £17,000, were stolen from a local farmer. In May 2011, a protest took place in the village regarding the proposed accommodation of sex offenders at Chatterton Hey House.

== Bibliography ==
- Gray, Margaret (1978). Edenfield: Church, Parish and Village 1778–1978. Edenfield: Edenfield PCC.
- Simpson, John (2003). A History of Edenfield and District. Edenfield: Edenfield Local History Society. ISBN 978-0-9516669-1-3.
