= Rossendale Valley =

River valley in Lancashire, England

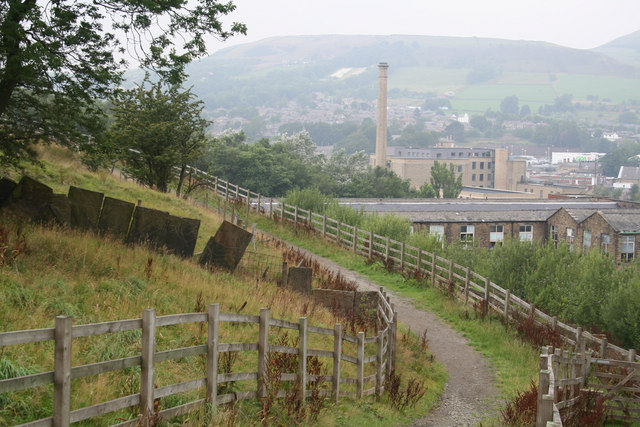
- The Rawtenstall end of the valley in 2006

- Location within Lancashire Location within the Borough of Rossendale
- Location: Rossendale, Lancashire
- Nearest city: Manchester, England
- Coordinates: 53.698°N 2.281°W

The Rossendale Valley is in the Rossendale area of Lancashire, England, between the West Pennine Moors and the main range of the Pennines. The area includes the steep-sided valleys of the River Irwell and its tributaries (between Rawtenstall and Bacup), which flow southwards into Greater Manchester. The rivers cut through the moorland of the Rossendale Hills, generally characterized by open unwooded land, despite the ancient designation of "forest".

== History ==
One of the earliest sites of historical interest in the valley is that of the dykes at Broadclough, which are associated with the Battle of Brunanburh.

In late Middle Ages, the valley was part of the Royal Forest of Rossendale. The original medieval meaning of 'forest' was similar to a 'preserve', for example land that is legally kept for specific purposes such as royal hunting. So 'forests' were areas large enough to support species such as wolves and deer for game hunting and they encompassed other habitats such as heaths, open grassland and farmland, so not necessarily extensively wooded. Initial settlement would have been in "booths" or farmsteads and encroachment into the forest would have developed them into small hamlets. Rossendale was governed by a constable nominated by principal landowners who held the position of "The Greave of the Forrest" which after 1515 became a quasi-hereditary position held by the Whitacker family at the only ancient hall in the district: Broadclough Hall.

In 1507 the land in the Forest of Rossendale was demised to copyhold farmers and a new church was established on the hillside at Seatnaze around 1511, presumably considered a convenient location for the population at that time.

The earliest turnpike trust enacted by Parliament to affect Rossendale was the Rochdale to Burnley Road Act 1755. In 1789 an act authorised the construction of new turnpike trust roads through the district, connecting Bury and Haslingden with Blackburn and Whalley, with a junction at Haslingden to Todmorden via Oakenheadwood, Newchurch, Stacksteads and Bacup. In 1826, the Haslingden and Todmorden trust built another new road along the valley bottom, from Stacksteads through Thrutch, Rawtenstall and Newhall Hey. By 1848, several woollen and cotton mills had been established along the river. And by the late 19th century, it was the valley bottom that had become the population centre.

In 1889, the short-lived Rossendale Valley Tramways Company was established to operate a route between Bacup and Crawshawbooth via Rawtenstall. In 1908 the route was taken over by Rawtenstall Corporation Tramways.

== Geography ==
The Forest contains two Marilyns; Hail Storm Hill and Freeholds Top, as well as the summit of Great Hameldon. Geographically, it is sandwiched between the West Pennine Moors to the west and the South Pennines to the east.

The Irwell Valley in Rossendale is characterised by the steep sided valley of the River Irwell and its tributaries which dissect the moorland of the Rossendale Hills. In the valley bottom, urban settlements grew up at river crossing points between Rawtenstall and Bacup and today form a contiguous urban and industrial development. Textile mills and chimneys and gritstone terraced houses are the dominant buildings and roads are concentrated in the narrow valley. The river has its source on Deerplay Moor in Cliviger near Burnley, heading south to Bacup, where it turns to the west past Stacksteads. The valley narrows at Thrutch, and the Irwell collects Whitewell Brook shortly afterwards at Waterfoot. It flows onward to Rawtenstall where it is met by Limy Water and then turns back to the south. Collecting the River Ogden at Irwell Vale it continues into Greater Manchester.

The geology of the area is layers of gritstone, coal and glacial deposits of sand and gravel. These rocks were cut by fast flowing rivers, the Irwell and its tributaries, to form steep valleys with sides typically 200 metres (660 ft) high and a narrow valley floor. Tree cover on the steep slopes includes remnants of ancient woodland but most areas are more recently planted.

== Notable people ==
- Jeff Whalley (1952–2018), professional footballer who played in the Football League as a left winger.
