= Waterfoot, Lancashire =

Coordinates: 53.692°N 2.251°W

Waterfoot
- View of Waterfoot in 2006

- Shown within Rossendale Location within Lancashire
- OS grid reference: SD834217
- District: Rossendale
- Shire county: Lancashire
- Region: North West
- Country: England
- Sovereign state: United Kingdom
- Post town: ROSSENDALE
- Postcode district: BB4
- Dialling code: 01706
- Police: Lancashire
- Fire: Lancashire
- Ambulance: North West
- UK Parliament: Rossendale and Darwen

Waterfoot is a historic mill town and civil parish in the borough of Rossendale between Rawtenstall and Bacup in Lancashire, England. The B6238 road from Burnley meets the A681 road, and Whitewell Brook the River Irwell.

== History ==
Like the majority of the industrial communities in East Lancashire, Waterfoot expanded rapidly in the 19th century with the growth of industrialisation; it became a centre for felt-making, a process related to the predominant textile industry of the region. Before that, the main centre was Newchurch-in-Rossendale, that sits above Waterfoot to the north. The township of Newchurch stretched from Bacup to Rawtenstall, and in 1511 it was recorded as having a population of 1,000 people, served by the monks of Whalley Abbey.

Waterfoot was on the Lancashire and Yorkshire Railway line between Bury and Bacup. This was dismantled in 1972 and the route is now hard to trace, although the tunnels can be seen in Thrutch Gorge or The Glen, a cutting to the east of the village.

== Industry ==
Woollen manufacture was formerly the chief industry, and there was some silk weaving, but since the 1770s cotton manufacture superseded wool as the principal business, with associated minor trades—size works, slipper works, dye works, foundries, reed and heald manufactories, roperies, saw-mills and cornmills. Stone was also extensively quarried in the vicinity, as well as there being small collieries.

Cotton became focused on the industrial manufacture of felt, which then developed into a footwear, specifically slipper, industry. Nowadays the remnants of this industry imports most of the footwear and act as distribution centres, which still line the roads approaching the village centre.

Charles Parsons set up a bicycle shop in Waterfoot, Lancashire, in 1931 but eight years later he had an accident that eventually led to his blindness. At the end of World War II he could not buy bicycle bags for the shop, although cotton cloth was still available. His wife and her sister began to make up bags for him. This business expanded rapidly and eventually became Karrimor, an international brand no longer associated with Waterfoot.

Chadwicks Original Bury Black Pudding Company, one of the county's original black pudding companies, manufactures its puddings in Waterfoot and is famous all over the world. RS Ireland's award-winning black puddings have also long been associated with Waterfoot, although they are now made in Haslingden.

== Features ==
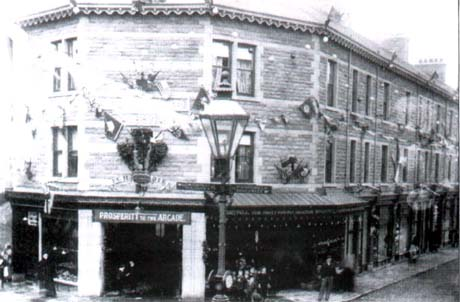
Trickett's Arcade c. 1900

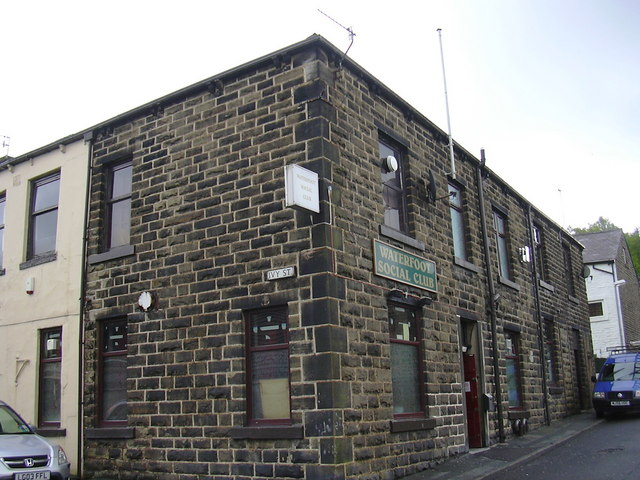
Waterfoot Social Club in 2009

The centre of Waterfoot has a distinctive canopied walkway in decorative iron and glass that is in need of restoration, forming the frontage of Victoria or Trickett's Arcade, started in 1897 and completed in March, 1899. The arcade was built by Sir Henry Whittaker Trickett – a local businessman who was five times mayor of Rawtenstall. In 1914, a clock was added to the front of the arcade in his memory. Hidden inside are eight other shop spaces and a decorative central iron and glass feature that have been closed to the public for 50 years. Yet on its opening 15,000 people turned up for the ceremony.

Waterfoot has a number of independent, specialist shops including Fletcher's Hardware, a hardware supplier.

Also located in Waterfoot is Bacup and Rawtenstall Grammar School, one of the few state funded selective entry schools left in England. Founded in 1701 as Newchurch Grammar School and only moved to the present site and took its current name in 1912. The village is served by two primary schools, Waterfoot Primary and St Anne's C of E Primary, both of which have rising pupil numbers in 2007.

On the moorland above the village is a memorial to the dialect poet, Edwin Waugh, known as Waugh's Well. Since 1993 fell runners from the surrounding communities have gathered annually to run a four-mile circuit of the hills above the village, passing the well.

For horseriders, the Pennine Bridleway passes through Waterfoot on the Mary Towneley Loop giving access to the unspoilt hill scenery overlooking the village, and it is also on the Irwell Sculpture Trail.

== Arts ==
Waterfoot is the home of the international touring theatre, Horse and Bamboo Theatre, a company that uses distinctive masks and puppetry. Their base is known as 'The Boo' and puts on a regular programme of theatre and other arts events. It is housed in an elegant former Liberal Club built in 1895. Another long-standing theatre group, The Rossendale Players, have their base at The New Millennium Theatre in Waterfoot, and have been giving performances for over 70 years. The area also has several artist's studios and is the base for Arthouse, a wallpaper design company. In 2000, the cartoonist Ray Lowry moved to Waterfoot from Rawtenstall.

To the west, towards Rawtenstall, the Kunstlerhaus was the base for Liverpool artist, Don McKinlay, who was also a member of Manchester Academy of Fine Arts. McKinlay undertook several sculpture commissions, including a Christ Child for Liverpool Cathedral and the memorial to Christopher Gray, the vicar of St Margaret's Church in Anfield, Liverpool, who was murdered in 1996. His wife and fellow Manchester Academician Janina Cebertowicz, is a painter and artist recording performances at Royal Northern College of Music in Manchester in addition to landscape and still life. North, on Burnley Road, Liam Spencer is among a group of notable painters, sculptors, and print-makers at Prospect Studios, and further along are the Clarke Holme/Valley Artists studios. To the east, at Tollbar in the direction of Bacup, is Globe Arts, the oldest of the local artists studio groups.

== Notable people ==
- William Mitchell (1838–1914) wool manufacturer and Conservative MP for Burnley.
- Whit Cunliffe (1875–1966), an English comic singer, he performed in music halls.
- Fred Smith (1898–1971) footballer who played 116 games for Bury F.C.
- Ray Lowry (1944–2008) cartoonist, illustrator and satirist, died in Waterfoot
- David Hoyle (born 1957) an Anglican priest and academic, 39th Dean of Westminster

== See also ==
- Listed buildings in Rawtenstall
