= William Shrewsbury =

English missionary

William James Shrewsbury (1795-1866) was a British Methodist minister, missionary, opponent of slavery and ecumenist who worked in the West Indies and South Africa.

He was born on 15 February 1795. In 1816, he was sent as a missionary to Tortola, the largest and most populated of the British Virgin Islands. He worked there for two years and then transferred to Grenada, moving from there, in 1820, to Barbados. He was expelled from Barbados as a result of religious persecution of the missions linked to Bussa's Rebellion, and following a riot in which the Methodist church in Barbados (built on land donated by Sarah Ann Gill) was destroyed. A debate led by Fowell Buxton MP was conducted in the House of Commons on 23 June 1825, concluding with a resolution that members of the House:

“declare, that they view with the utmost indignation that scandalous and daring violation of the law; and having seen with great satisfaction the instructions which have been sent out by his majesty's Secretary of State to the governor of Barbadoes, to prevent a recurrence of similar outrages, they humbly assure his Majesty (George IV) of their readiness to concur in every measure which his Majesty may deem necessary for securing ample protection and religious toleration to all his Majesty's subjects in that part of his Majesty's dominions."

He later served as a missionary among the Xhosa people in South Africa.

In 1843 he published Christian thoughts on free trade : in a letter to Thomas, David & Peter Whitehead, the letter being addressed to Thomas, David and Peter Whitehead, methodist businessmen of Rawtenstall.
