= Listed buildings in Rawtenstall =

Rawtenstall is a town in Rossendale, Lancashire, England. Associated with it, or nearby, are the communities of Waterfoot, Newchurch, Ewood Bridge, Lumb, Water, Crawshawbooth, Goodshaw, and Love Clough. The area contains 100 buildings that are recorded in the National Heritage List for England as designated listed buildings. Of these, eight are listed at Grade II*, the middle grade, and the others are at Grade II, the lowest grade. Until the coming of the Industrial Revolution the area was rural, and most of the oldest listed buildings are, or originated as, farmhouses, farm buildings, cottages and larger houses. A former packhorse bridge has survived, and is listed. The earliest evidence of industry is in the weavers' cottages, some of which are listed. Later came the mills; some of these have survived and are listed. The other listed buildings are those associated with the growing population and include churches and associated structures, public houses, shops, a bank, schools, a road bridge and a railway viaduct, a library, the gateway to the cemetery, and war memorials.

== Key ==
Grade	Criteria
II*	Particularly important buildings of more than special interest
II	Buildings of national importance and special interest

== Buildings ==
Name and location	Photograph	Date	Notes	Grade
Lower Lench Farmhouse; 53.68999°N 2.25800°W	—	Late medieval or early 16th century	Originally a farmhouse, later converted into a house and an outbuilding. It is in sandstone with quoins. The house has a tiled roof and the outbuilding roof is of stone-slate. The house has two storeys and two bays, with a single-storey gabled porch. Some windows are stepped with three lights, and others are mullioned. Features of the outbuilding include a window with three round-headed lights, a Tudor arched doorway, and a cellar with a semicircular vaulted roof.	II
2–6 Old Street; 53.69759°N 2.25266°W		16th century (probable)	This was originally a farmhouse, later converted into three dwellings. It is in sandstone with quoins and a stone-slate roof. There are two storeys and three bays. The original doorway, now to No, 6, has a Tudor arch cut into a massive lintel. The windows are mullioned, those in the ground floor having round-headed lights.	II
Lower Constable Lee Farmhouse; 53.70983°N 2.28792°W		17th century (or earlier)	A sandstone house with a slate roof in two storeys. It has an F-shaped plan, with a main range of three bays, a projecting porch, and a projecting wing. The two-storey porch has an outer doorway with a large lintel, and an inner doorway with a chamfered surround. Most of the windows have been altered, but some mullioned windows remain.	II
Edenfield Parish Church; 53.67437°N 2.30629°W		1614	The oldest part of the church is the tower, the rest of the church dating from 1778. It is in sandstone with a slate roof, and consists of a two-storey nave, a short chancel, and a west tower. The tower has diagonal buttresses, square windows, an inscribed stone, and an embattled parapet, Along the sides of the nave, the windows in the lower storey are arched, and those above have flat heads. In the south wall is a sundial. The chancel has a Venetian window and a datestone above it. Inside the church is a gallery on three sides, and some box pews.	II*
Barn, Goodshaw Fold; 53.73696°N 2.29233°W		1618	The barn is in sandstone with large quoins and a corrugated sheet roof. It has an H-shaped plan with three bays and outshuts. Between the outshuts are flat-headed wagon doorways. There is a doorway with chamfered jambs, and a quoin inscribed with the date.	II
Higher Lench Farmhouse; 53.68990°N 2.26716°W	—	Early 17th century	The farmhouse was altered in the 18th century with an extension to the east. It is in sandstone with stone-slate roofs, and has two storeys and a T-shaped plan. The original part has two bays and mullioned windows. The extension also has two bays, a single-story gabled porch, and stepped triple-light windows.	II
2 and 4 Higher Constable Lee; 53.71240°N 2.28647°W		17th century	Originally a farmhouse, later divided into two dwellings, the building is in sandstone with a stone-slate roof. It has two storeys and two bays, with a two-storey gabled porch. The windows are mullioned. Inside is a large inglenook fireplace and a bressumer.	II
Lumb Old Hall; 53.67363°N 2.32085°W		17th century	The house, which incorporates earlier material, has a cruck-framed core, and is encased in sandstone, with quoins, and a stone slate roof. There are two storeys and two bays. The south front is gabled and contains a Tudor arched doorway and casement windows with chamfered surrounds. Over the ground floor is a continuous hood mould. Inside the house is a full cruck truss.	II
Packhorse Bridge; 53.69969°N 2.28732°W		17th century (probable)	The bridge crosses the River Irwell. It is in stone and consists of two irregular segmental arches. There is a half-height cutwater on the east side, and its parapets have rounded coping.	II
Friends' Burial Ground; 53.70901°N 2.27588°W		1663	A rectangular enclosure about 15 metres (49 ft) by 12 metres (39 ft), with a dry stone wall about 3 metres (9.8 ft) high. On the north side is a gateway with an inscribed lintel. The walls were rebuilt in 1847.	II
Ashenbottom Farmhouse; 53.68352°N 2.30937°W		1690	A sandstone farmhouse, partly rendered, with some quoins and a stone-slate roof. It has two storeys and a roughly cruciform plan, with a three-bay front, a protruding porch, and a rear extension. Part of the ground floor has been covered by a later roadway. The porch has two storeys and contains a datestone. One of the windows is mullioned, and the others have been altered.	II
Newhouses Cottages; 53.70376°N 2.28140°W		1691	Originally a farmhouse with an attached cottage, later converted into three dwellings. They are in sandstone with some quoins and a stone-slate roof. There are two storeys and a front of three bays. In the front is a two-storey gabled porch that has a doorway with a large lintel, and a datestone above. Some of the windows are mullioned, and others have been altered. Inside the building is an inglenook bressumer.	II
Hargreaves Fold Farmhouse South; 53.72144°N 2.24184°W	—	c. 1700	The farmhouse is in sandstone with quoins and a roof partly of slate and partly of stone-slate. It is in two storeys, and has a T-shaped plan, with three bays and an outshut. Most of the windows are mullioned.	II
Crawshawbooth Quaker Meeting House; 53.72439°N 2.28821°W		1716	The meeting house was extended in 1736 and 1793, and altered in the 20th century. It is in sandstone with a roof of sandstone slate, and has an L-shaped plan. On the left is a three-storey one-bay double-depth dwelling house incorporating a former stable, and to the right is the single-storey four-bay meeting house. On the front of the meeting house is a gabled porch, and mullioned and transomed windows. To the left of the porch, external steps lead up to the middle floor of the dwelling house.	II*
11 and 12 Love Clough Fold; 53.74150°N 2.28850°W		Early 18th century	Originally a farmhouse, later converted for other uses, it is in sandstone with a stone-slate roof. There are two storeys and three bays with a two-storey gabled porch that has a round-headed open doorway. The windows are mullioned, some containing sashes and others casements.	II
Barn, Love Clough Farm; 53.74169°N 2.28825°W		Early 18th century (probable)	A sandstone barn with quoins and a stone-slate roof. It has a rectangular plan, and contains a large wagon entrance, doorways, windows, and owl hole in both gables.	II
Lower Chapel Hill Farmhouse; 53.70795°N 2.27869°W		Early 18th century (probable)	The farmhouse is in sandstone with a stone-slate roof, and has two storeys and a T-shaped plan with a front of three bays. On the front the windows are square or mullioned, and at the rear is a wing with a plain doorway.	II
Hugh Rake Farmhouse and shippon 53.71948°N 2.29787°W		1732	The farmhouse and attached shippon are in sandstone with a stone-slate roof, they have two storeys, and each has two bays. The house has a rear outshut, and on the front is a two-storey gabled porch that has a doorway with an inscribed lintel. The windows are mullioned, and the shippon has a segmental-arched entrance.	II
Higher Chapel Hill Farmhouse; 53.71055°N 2.27607°W		Early to mid 18th century	A sandstone farmhouse with a stone-slate roof in two storeys. It has an L-shaped plan, with a two-bay front and a rear extension. The doorway has a plain surround, and most of the windows are mullioned.	II
Carr Bank Farmhouse; 53.72501°N 2.29552°W	—	Mid 18th century	The farmhouse was originally two dwellings, and has since been used for other purposes. It is in sandstone with a stone-slate roof, and has a cruciform plan. There are two storeys with a main range of two bays, a two-storey porch at the front, and an extension at the rear. The porch has two open doorways with plain surrounds, and a recess for a datestone. The windows are sashes.	II
Lane Ends Farmhouse and barn 53.69758°N 2.24117°W		18th century	The farmhouse and barn are in sandstone with a stone-slate roof. The house has two storeys and two bays, with a plain doorway. There are two casement windows, a stepped three-light window, and a small sash window. The barn also has two bays, and contains a round-arched wagon entrance and a plain doorway.	II
Laund Farmhouse and outbuilding 53.71543°N 2.29945°W	—	Mid 18th century	The attached outbuilding is dated 1863. Both parts are in sandstone, the house with a stone-slate roof, and the outbuilding with a roof of corrugated sheeting. The house has two storeys and mullioned windows, some of which are stepped. The outbuilding contains a cart entrance with a semicircular head, a pitching hole in the form of an oculus, a datestone, windows, and doorways.	II
Lumb Bridge; 53.67484°N 2.31894°W		18th century (probable)	The bridge carries a road over the River Irwell. It is in sandstone, and consists of two segmental arches with rounded coping to the parapets.	II
Sundial; 53.69713°N 2.25294°W	—	18th century (probable)	The sundial is in the churchyard of the Church of St Nicholas with St John. It is in sandstone, and consists of a baluster-shaped pedestal with a moulded cap. On the top is a brass plate, a gnomon and a memorial tablet.	II
Old Farmhouse; 53.67884°N 2.24672°W	—	1752	The farmhouse is in sandstone with a stone-slate roof, in two storeys and two bays. The front is symmetrical with a central two-storey porch containing a plain doorway and a casement window. The other windows are sashes with mullions, and on the front is an inscribed datestone.	II
Waingate Farmhouse; 53.70588°N 2.27759°W		1755	A sandstone farmhouse with a tile roof, in two storeys with an attic and two bays. The doorway has a moulded architrave and pediment, and above it is a decorated datestone. The windows are mullioned, and in the left return is a plain doorway.	II
Old Baptist Chapel; 53.73281°N 2.28146°W		1760	A Baptist chapel that was enlarged on a number of occasions in the later 18th and early 19th centuries. It is in sandstone with a stone-slate roof, and ball finials on the roof and gables. The chapel has two storeys and a rectangular three-bay plan. There are two doorways with slab canopies and sash windows on the front. At the rear the windows are mullioned. Inside there are galleries on three sides and box pews.	II*
"Weavers' Cottage" Fall Barn Fold; 53.70082°N 2.28135°W		Late 18th century (probable)	Built as an 18th Century Loom Shop, it was later altered and used for other purposes, including housing. The building is in sandstone with a stone-slate roof in three storeys. There is a central doorway with a plain surround flanked by three-light stepped windows. In each of the upper storeys is a row of six smaller three-light stepped windows. At the rear is a dog-legged external flight of steps to the top floor.	II
5 Bolton Street; 53.69766°N 2.25431°W		Late 18th century	A cottage in sandstone with a stone-slate roof, in two storeys and with a symmetrical two-bay front. It has a central doorway with a plain surround, and two three-light stepped windows in each floor.	II
332 Edgeside Road; 53.69835°N 2.24089°W		Late 18th century (probable)	A sandstone house with a stone-slate roof in three storeys and two bays, with a two-storey outshut at the rear. The doorway has a plain surround, and the windows, some of which are mullioned, now contain casements.	II
334 Edgeside Road; 53.69826°N 2.24091°W		Late 18th century (probable)	A sandstone house with a stone-slate roof in three storeys and three bays. The windows are top-hung casements, some with mullions. The doorway has a plain surround.	II
5 Hargreaves Fold Cottages; 53.72144°N 2.24211°W	—	Late 18th century (probable)	A cottage in the centre of a row of three, in sandstone with a stone-slate roof. It has two storeys and two bays, and a doorway with a plain surround. On the front is a square window, the other windows being stepped with three lights.	II
16 and 18 Shaw Clough Road; 53.70531°N 2.24418°W		Late 18th century	A pair of sandstone cottages with a stone-slate roof in two storeys. Each cottage has one bay, a board door and mullioned windows.	II
3 and 5 Yates Cottages; 53.70577°N 2.24507°W		Late 18th century	A pair of sandstone cottages with stone-slate roofs in two storeys, each cottage having two bays. In the centre of each cottage is a doorway with a plain surround, and three of the windows are stepped with three lights, the other window having been altered.	II
Bridge End Farmhouse and barn 53.72627°N 2.22472°W	—	Late 18th century	The house and attached barn are in sandstone with quoins and stone-slate roofs. The house has two storeys and two bays, and has a gabled porch with a doorway, and another doorway with a slab canopy. Some of the windows are stepped with three lights, others have been altered. The barn is in three bays, and has a wagon entrance with a segmental-arched porch and a plain doorway.	II
Carr Farmhouse; 53.69384°N 2.28896°W	—	Late 18th century (probable)	A sandstone farmhouse with a stone-slate roof in two storeys and two bays. On the front is a two-storey gabled porch with a plain doorway. The original mullioned windows have been replaced by casements.	II
Chamber Height Farmhouse and barn 53.73191°N 2.25123°W	—	Late 18th century	The house and barn are in sandstone with a stone-slate roof. The house has two storeys and one bay, with a single-storey gabled porch and a simple doorway. The windows have been altered. The barn has three bays, and contains a central segmental-headed wagon entrance.	II
Heightside; 53.70137°N 2.25786°W		Late 18th century	A sandstone mansion with a slate roof in two storeys. It is three bays deep and has a symmetrical front of five bays in Neoclassical style. On the front are rusticated quoins at the right side, a frieze with triglyphs, and a moulded cornice. The central doorway has fluted pilasters, a triglyph frieze, and a large segmental pediment. All the windows are sashes, the window above the doorway having an architrave with a fluted keystone.	II
Higher Fairbanks Farmhouse and barn 53.73198°N 2.30021°W	—	Late 18th century	A farmhouse and barn in sandstone with a stone-slate roof. The house has two storeys and two bays and a low gabled porch. The doorway has been altered, and the windows are mullioned. The barn has a segmental-headed wagon entrance, a small square window, and a plain doorway.	II
Higher Hollin; 53.70717°N 2.24495°W	—	Late 18th century	A row of three cottages (originally five, but two have been demolished), in sandstone with a stone-slate roof, and in two storeys. The left cottage has two bays, and the other have one each. The doorways have plain surrounds, and the windows are stepped with three lights.	II
Holme Bridge; 53.69370°N 2.30264°W		Late 18th century (probable)	The bridge carries Holme Lane over the River Irwell. It is in sandstone and consists of two segmental arches with rusticated voussoirs. There is a pilaster at each end, and the pier has a cutwater and a slab-walled parapet.	II
Lower Fairbanks Farmhouse; 53.73107°N 2.29913°W	—	Late 18th century	The farmhouse is in sandstone with a stone-slate roof, and has two storeys and two bays. There is a single-storey gabled porch with a plain doorway. The windows are mullioned, containing casements, and one is stepped with three lights. On the left is a single-storey extension with a slate roof.	II
Lower Laund Mill; 53.71019°N 2.29014°W		Late 18th century	Originally a water-power woollen mill, later used for other purposes, it is in sandstone with a stone-slate roof. The building has a rectangular plan with four bays and a two-bay extension to the right. There are two storeys and a basement. The building has a large round-arched doorway, and most of the windows are mullioned.	II
Lower Tippett Farmhouse and barn 53.68488°N 2.25340°W	—	Late 18th century (probable)	Two farmhouses and a barn, later converted into three dwellings. They are in sandstone with roofs partly of slate and partly of stone-slate. There are two storeys with a cellar, and each house has two bays. At the rear is a vaulted well-house. The doorways are plain, some windows are mullioned, and some are stepped with three lights.	II
Pinner Lane Cottage; 53.72297°N 2.29167°W	—	Late 18th century (probable)	A sandstone cottage with a stone-slate roof, in two storeys with an attic and a two-bay front. There is a plain doorway in the east gable wall, and most of the windows are stepped with three lights.	II
Prince Gate Farmhouse and shippon 53.72219°N 2.23139°W		Late 18th century	The farmhouse and attached shippon are in sandstone with quoins. The house has a tiled roof, and is in two storeys and two bays. On the front is a single-storey gabled porch that has a plain doorway. There are two triple-light stepped windows in each floor. The shippon has a stone-slate roof and a finial on the gable.	II
Bower, Sunnyside; 53.72260°N 2.29172°W	—	Late 18th century (probable)	The bower is in sandstone and is attached to the boundary wall of the grounds of Sunnyside House. It is about 3 metres (9.8 ft) wide and 1 metre (3 ft 3 in) deep, and contains a stone bench, and there is a datestone on the rear wall.	II
Turn Hill Farmhouse and cottages 53.72923°N 2.22437°W		Late 18th century	A farmhouse and three attached cottages that incorporate earlier material. They are in sandstone on a plinth and have a stone-slate roof. The buildings are in two storeys and have a front of six bays. There are two single-storey gabled porches on the front, and two full-height outshuts at the rear. Most of the windows have been altered but three stepped triple-light windows remain.	II
Penrallt Cottage; 53.70373°N 2.24545°W		1779	Originally a farmhouse, it is in sandstone with a slate roof, and has two storeys with an attic, and two bays. There is a plain doorway with a slab canopy, above which is an incised datestone. The windows are mullioned, and at the rear is a tall stairlight.	II
Springside Cottage; 53.70406°N 2.28302°W		1795	A sandstone house with a stone-slate roof in two storeys and two bays. It has a plain doorway and stepped windows, those to the left of the door having five lights, and those to the right having three. Above the doorway is a datestone.	II
1135–1141 Burnley Road; 53.72965°N 2.24104°W		c. 1800	A row of four sandstone cottages with a stone-slate roof in two storeys. Each house has one bay, a plain doorway to the right, a three-light stepped window to the left, and two square windows in the upper floor.	II
5–11 Daisy Hill; 53.70308°N 2.28431°W		c. 1800	A row of five sandstone cottages with a stone-slate roof in two storeys. No. 5 has two bays, and each of the other cottages has one bay. The doorway have plain surrounds, and most of the windows on the front are sashes. No. 9 has a former cart entrance that has been filled in and a window inserted. At the rear the windows are top-hung casements.	II
373 and 375 Haslingden Old Road; 53.70234°N 2.30364°W		c. 1800	A pair of sandstone cottages with a stone-slate roof in two storeys. Each house has one bay and a doorway with a plain surround and a slab canopy. The windows are mullioned, those on the front being stepped with three lights.	II
2–8 Middle Carr Farm; 53.69700°N 2.28108°W	—	c. 1800	A row of four sandstone cottages with a stone-slate roof in two storeys. Each cottage has one bay, and the doorways have plain surrounds. Each cottage has a stepped triple-light window in each floor, and a two-light mullioned window over the door.	II
Hurst Farm and Cottage; 53.70576°N 2.28058°W		c. 1800	A pair of sandstone cottages with quoins and a stone-slate roof in two storeys. Each house has one bay and a doorway with a plain surround. The windows on the front are stepped with three lights, and those at the rear are mullioned.	II
1 and 3 Daisy Hill; 53.70308°N 2.28436°W		1820	Originally a pair of cottages, later converted into a shop and a garage. They are in sandstone with a stone-slate roof, in two storeys and four bays. On the front are a plain doorway, sash windows, a shop window, and a garage door. At the rear is a doorway with an inscribed pediment, and windows that include two that are stepped with three lights.	II
White Jones Farmhouse; 53.68423°N 2.28276°W	—	1822	A house with attached barn in sandstone with quoins and a stone-slate roof. The house has two storeys, and one bay, with an extension to the right. The plain doorway has slab canopy, there are triple-light stepped windows in each floor, and on the front is an inscribed quoin. The extension contains mullioned windows. The barn has two storeys, a lean-to the left and another at the rear, and contains a sliding door with a slab canopy.	II
Church of St Nicholas with St John; 53.69721°N 2.25257°W		1825	The church replaced two earlier churches on the site, and a chancel was added in 1897–98. It is in sandstone and consists of a two-storey nave, a chancel, and a west tower. The tower has three stages, with diagonal buttresses, a west doorway, a rectangular stair turret, clock faces, and an embattled parapet with corner pinnacles. The nave has rusticated quoins and two tiers of square windows. Inside there is a gallery on three sides, and elaborately carved and canopied choir stalls.	II*
63 and 65 Church Street; 53.69767°N 2.25339°W		Early 19th century	A pair of sandstone shops with a stone-slate roof, in two storeys and two bays. Each shop has an original shop front in the ground floor and top-hung casement windows above. At the rear is a three-light mullioned window.	II
1 Yates Cottages and barn 53.70566°N 2.24526°W		Early 19th century	A small farmhouse and attached barn in sandstone with a stone-slate roof, and in two storeys. The house has one bay, a plain doorway and vertical rectangular windows. The barn has three bays, a segmental-headed wagon entrance, a loading door, doorways, and windows.	II
Greenbridge Works; 53.69985°N 2.27909°W		Early 19th century	Originally a water mill, later converted into steam, it is in sandstone with a roof of slate with skylights. It is in 4 1/2 stories and has a rectangular plan of 22 by 4 bays, with an engine house on the east and a stair turret on the west. The body of the mill contains plain vertical rectangular windows, and some of the windows in the engine house are round-headed.	II
Rams Head; 53.70461°N 2.28539°W		Early 19th century	A public house in sandstone with a slate roof in three storeys. It has a symmetrical three-bay front with a central round-headed doorway. The windows are sashes, those in the outer bays with a central mullion.	II
Church of St Mary and All Saints; 53.73165°N 2.28283°W		1829	The church is built on the site of earlier churches and is in Early English style. It is in sandstone with a slate roof. The church consists of a two-storey nave with a short extension at the west end. The east end is gabled, contains a triple stepped lancet window. On the apex of the gable is a bellcote, which is set diagonally, and which has an embattled parapet. At the west end is an arched doorway on the side, and another triple stepped lancet window.	II
Queen's Arms Hotel; 53.70082°N 2.28717°W		1830	The public house is in sandstone with a hipped slate roof. There are three storeys, and symmetrical fronts of three and five bays. There is a moulded cornice and a low parapet. The doorways and windows have plain surrounds, and some of the windows are sashes.	II
Crawshaw Hall; 53.72061°N 2.29051°W		1831	A country house in ashlar with a lead-clad roof. It has two and three storeys, north and south fronts of six bays, and corner octagonal turrets with battlements. On the entrance front is a single-storey canted porch with a Tudor arched head, a fanlight, and an embattled parapet. On the garden front is a full-height canted bay window with pinnacles.	II*
Lodge, Crawshaw Hall; 53.72109°N 2.28994°W		c. 1831	The lodge is built in ashlar, and is in Gothic style. It has a rectangular plan, it is in two storeys, and has a symmetrical three-bay front with a cornice and parapet. There is a central porch with a Tudor arched doorway, and the windows are paired round-headed lancets with hood moulds.	II
Gate piers, Crawshaw Hall; 53.72106°N 2.28985°W		c. 1831	The gate piers are in sandstone. Each has a square plinth, a chamfered shaft with quatrefoils at the top, and an embattled parapet.	II
Chimney, Greenbridge Works; 53.69891°N 2.27897°W		Early to mid 19th century	The chimney is to an underground flue from Greenbridge Works. It stands on a hillside, it is in sandstone with a square plan, and tapers as it rises.	II
Holly Mount; 53.70200°N 2.28805°W		1835	A row of three houses in sandstone under a single hipped slate roof. They have two storeys and each house has three bays with pilasters between the houses and the bays. The doorways have round heads, pilastered architraves, and unfluted Ionic doorcases. At the rear are three round-headed stairlights.	II
St Mary's Church; 53.70129°N 2.28766°W		1836–38	The west end and the tower were added in 1881. The church is in sandstone with a slate roof, and is in Early English style. It consists of a nave without aisles, a short chancel, and a southwest tower. The tower is in four stages, with a porch that was originally open, but closed in the early 21st century, pilasters at the corners, a stair turret that rises higher than the tower, clock faces, grotesques, and an embattled parapet with pinnacles. The windows are lancets.	II
Tower of former Holly Mount School; 53.70168°N 2.28709°W		1839	The tower was originally part of a factory school that has been demolished. It is in sandstone and in Perpendicular style. The tower has a rectangular plan, it is in three stages, and has diagonal buttresses, a clock face, and an embattled parapet with crocketed pinnacles. In the bottom stage is a decorative datestone and an inscribed plaque.	II
Tower, Sunnyside; 53.72043°N 2.29311°W	—	1839	The tower stands in the grounds of Sunnyside House, and was originally the top of an underground chimney flue from the Sunnyside Printworks. It is in sandstone and has a square section. The structure is about 20 feet (6.1 m) high and has diagonal buttresses that rise above a cornice to form crocketed pinnacles.	II
Longholme Parsonage; 53.70084°N 2.28664°W		c. 1840	A sandstone house with quoins and a slate roof, in two storeys. It has an L-shaped plan, with a three-bay main block and a service wing at the rear. The main front is symmetrical and has a central doorway with a moulded architrave and a rectangular fanlight. The windows are sashes.	II
Longholme Methodist Church; 53.70103°N 2.28619°W		1841–42	The Methodist church was designed by James Simpson in Greek Revival style. It is in sandstone with a slate roof, and has a rectangular plan by six by five bays. At the front is a portico with four unfluted Ionic columns on five steps, and a pediment. Behind this are two double doorways, two tiers of windows with architraves, and giant pilasters. Along the sides are two tiers of round-headed windows. Inside a ceiling has been inserted to make a hall in the lower part and a church above.	II
Gateway and railings, Longholme Methodist Church; 53.70131°N 2.28691°W		1841–42	The cast iron railings surround most of the churchyard, they have spear heads and are on a stone plinth. The railings are divided into groups of twelve by posts with acorn finials. At the northwest corner are square gate piers with banded faces, moulded caps and rounded tops, and between them are iron gates.	II
Church of St James the Less; 53.70815°N 2.28826°W		1845	A Roman Catholic church in sandstone with a slate roof, and in Early English style. It consists of a nave, a south porch, a chancel with a south vestry, and a small northwest tower. The tower is in three stages, it incorporates a porch, and has angle buttresses, a niche containing a statue, a set-back top stage, and a pyramidal roof. In the west gable are stepped triple lancets flanked by single lancets, with a rose window above.	II
Railway viaduct 53.67380°N 2.31988°W		1846	The viaduct was built by the Lancashire and Yorkshire Railway to carry its line over the valley of the River Irwell. It is in sandstone and red brick, and consists of nine segmental arches with punched voussoirs and brick soffits, carried on tapering piers. The arches have a span of 40 feet (12 m), and the viaduct is 60 feet (18 m) high.	II
St Michael's Church; 53.72010°N 2.24793°W		1847–48	The church is in Norman style, and built in sandstone, with roofs partly of slate and partly of stone-slate. It has a cruciform plan consisting of a nave, a west porch, transepts, an apsidal chancel, and a tower at the crossing, and a cylindrical stair turret with a conical roof. At the top of the tower is a corbelled parapet and a weathervane. The openings are round-headed.	II
Spewing Duck Well; 53.73611°N 2.29291°W		1855	A public well of spring water in stone. It has a rectangular tank, a rectangular stone reredos with carved head, and a pipe with a semicircular bowl. On the top is an inscribed lintel.	II
Former United Methodist Church; 53.70007°N 2.29118°W		1855–57	Originally a Free United Methodist church, later used for other purposes and known as St Mary's Centre. It is in ashlar with a slate roof, it has two storeys, a rectangular plan of five by six bays, and is in Neoclassical style. On the front is a large portico with four Corinthian columns, a plain frieze, and a dentilled cornice and pediment. Behind it are sash windows and two doorways, all with architraves and segmental-arched heads, and Corinthian pilasters. The pilasters continue along the sides, and there are two tiers of sash windows with round heads.	II
Horncliffe House; 53.68266°N 2.30317°W		1856	A large house in sandstone with hipped slate roofs, in two storeys, and in Italianate style. There is a symmetrical three-bay front that has a rectangular porch with a round-headed arch, a dentilled cornice, and a balustraded parapet with an ornamental pediment and corner finials. The windows are sashes, those in the upper floor have decorated surrounds, including carved parapets with finials. The interior includes Art Nouveau features.	II
Ilex Mill; 53.70049°N 2.28226°W		1856	Built as a mill for spinning and weaving cotton, it is in sandstone. The main part has five storeys with nine-pane vertical windows and channelled corner pilasters. There are also two- and three-storey wings. At the north is a detached tall chimney with a square rusticated base, and is octagonal above with a cornice at the top. The building was converted into flats in 2002–04.	II
Hardman's Mill; 53.69686°N 2.29740°W		1862	Originally a woollen mill, then a cotton mill, and later converted into business units. It is in sandstone, and has a long rectangular plan of twenty by four bays. There are four storeys, and a parapet with a Lombard frieze. All the windows have flat heads and twenty panes, there is a projecting five-bay centre, and a basket archway to the right. At the rear are two turrets, and at the east end is an engine house.	II
Ashlands; 53.69891°N 2.25126°W		1863	A large house in Italianate style, built in ashlar. It has an L-shaped plan with a rectangular main block and a service block at the rear. There are two storeys with basements, and rusticated quoins, a plinth, a moulded cornice and a parapet. The main front has three bays, the third bay projecting under a pedimented gable, and with a single-storey porch in the angle. Most of the windows are sashes with architraves.	II
Church of St James the Great; 53.69281°N 2.25527°W		1863–65	The church was designed by Robinson and Stephens, and has since been converted into offices. It is in sandstone with slate roofs, and is orientated on a north-south axis. The church consists of a nave, a west aisle, a south porch, a chancel, and a southwest steeple. The steeple has a three-stage tower, angle buttresses, clock faces, and a broach spire with belfry lucarnes. The gable end of the nave facing the road contains an arched doorway and a three-light window containing plate tracery. The other windows are lancets.	II
Harrier Hound Monument; 53.69677°N 2.25257°W		1864	The monument is in the churchyard of the Church of St Nicholas with St John, and commemorates Methusalah Yates, a huntsman. It is in ashlar and consists of a base and a pedestal on which there is a block with inscribed panels and carvings. On top of the block is a lifelike sculpture of a harrier hound.	II*
Former Rakefoot Methodist Church; 53.72304°N 2.28721°W		1866–67	The former Methodist church is in Italianate style, and is built in sandstone with a slate roof. It has a rectangular plan with a front of three bays, and eight bays along the sides, and is in two storeys. The entrance front is symmetrical, with a pediment containing a lunette, and channelled pilasters. In the centre are paired round-headed doorways with an architrave of three Tuscan half-columns. The ground floor windows have segmental heads, and those in the upper floor have round heads. Inside is a complete oval gallery.	II
National Westminster Bank; 53.70214°N 2.28579°W		1868	The bank is on a corner site, with two storeys, and has an L-shaped plan. It is in ashlar, with channelled rustication in the ground floor, a hipped slate roof, and is in free Renaissance style. The doorway is on Bank Street, and has a round head and a dentilled cornice. On the corner is a semicircular oriel window that rises to form a turret with a lead-clad ogival domed roof with a finial.	II
Rakefoot Methodist Church; 53.72309°N 2.28687°W		1874	Originally a Methodist school and later used as a church, it is in sandstone with a slate roof, and is in simple Italianate style. It has a rectangular plan with sides of three and six bays. The entrance front is symmetrical with channelled pilasters, and a pediment containing an oculus. The central bay breaks forward and contains a round-headed doorway with imposts, a keystone, and a cornice. Above the doorway is a round-headed window and a smaller pediment, and these are flanked by round-headed sash windows. The first bay of the right return is also pedimented.	II
Cribden House School; 53.69763°N 2.30329°W		Late 19th century	Originally a country house named Brynbella, it has later been used as a school. The house is in sandstone with a hipped slate roof, rusticated quoins and a modillioned cornice, and is in Italianate style. The garden front is symmetrical with two bays and it contains four French windows. The other windows are sashes. The entrance front has a rusticated porch that with a round-headed doorway and a balustraded parapet.	II
Chimney, Hardman's Mill; 53.69684°N 2.29693°W		Late 19th century	The chimney is in sandstone and it stands on a cubical plinth. It is 49 metres (161 ft) high, with a square section and chamfered corners. There are lancet-like openings at three levels, a platform with iron railings at the top, and a cap with a Lombard frieze and a cornice.	II
Gateway, Rawtenstall Cemetery; 53.70582°N 2.28582°W		Late 19th century	The gateway consists of four sandstone piers with cast iron gates in Gothic style. The piers are similar, square in section, about 3 metres (9.8 ft) high, with slightly tapered pedestals, foliated shafts, an arcaded frieze, a hollow cornice with ball flower ornaments, and trefoil-faced caps. Between them are openwork ornamental gates.	II
Staghills Lodge; 53.69478°N 2.26229°W		Late 19th century	The lodge to Staghills House, which has been demolished, is in sandstone with a slate roof, and is in Gothic style. It has an L-shaped plan with two short wings, and a porch with a stepped embattled parapet in the angle. It has a single storey with a basement at the rear. Features include a Tudor arched doorway, gables with pinnacles, and stepped triple-light windows.	II
Victoria Parade; 53.69268°N 2.25330°W		Late 19th century	A parade of shops with accommodation above, in sandstone with Welsh slate roofs and clay ridge tiles. It has a triangular plan with two arms converging at the south. There are three storeys, an east arm of 16 bays, and a west arm of 12 bays, and each shop has two bays. In the ground floor are shop fronts, and a continuous glazed canopy on cast iron columns. In the upper two storeys are sash windows. On the angle between the arms is a decorative panel containing a clock face, below which is a plaque containing a portrait in relief.	II
St John's Church; 53.70030°N 2.27352°W		1889–90	The church, designed by Paley, Austin and Paley, is now redundant and has been used as a warehouse. It is in sandstone with a slate roof, and has features of Perpendicular and Arts and Crafts styles. The church is in a north-south axis, and consists of a nave with aisles, double transepts, a chancel, and the base of an uncompleted southwest tower. The tower base has angle buttresses, an arched doorway, blind arcading, and a pyramidal roof.	II
St John the Evangelist's Church; 53.72264°N 2.28913°W		1890–92	The church was designed by Paley, Austin and Paley in Perpendicular style, and is in sandstone with dressings of Yorkshire stone and roofs of Cumberland slate. It consists of a nave and chancel in one unit, aisles, a clerestory along the nave, a south transept, and a tower over the north transept. The tower has diagonal buttresses, an embattled parapet, and corner turrets with crocketed pinnacles.	II*
St Paul's Church; 53.71026°N 2.28853°W		1903	The church, designed by Austin and Paley, is on a sloping site. It is in sandstone with a slate roof, and consists of a nave, a south aisle, two south porches, and a chancel. One of the porches is gabled and contains a niche with a statue, and the other porch has a set-back parapet. A tower was planned but never built. The east window of the chancel and the west window of the nave contain Perpendicular tracery, and the tracery in the other windows is Geometrical.	II
Central Library; 53.70070°N 2.28853°W		1903	A Carnegie library with additions to the rear in 1914, it is in red brick and sandstone with slate roofs. The library has an L-shaped plan with two two-storey wings meeting at an angle and a single storey reading room at the rear. The entrance is in the angle of the wings, and has a porch with two Ionic columns, an inscribed frieze, and a dentilled cornice. Above this is a balustraded drum with an octagonal lantern, a domed roof, and a finial. The windows in the wings are sashes. Inside the library is an Ionic colonnade and an Art Nouveau balustrade to the staircase.	II
War memorial, Rawtenstall Cemetery; 53.70556°N 2.28470°W		1915	The first community war memorial to be erected in England in the First World War. It is in pale grey granite, and contains incised inscriptions. The memorial consists of a plinth on two steps carrying a plain cross.	II
War memorial 53.70096°N 2.28819°W		c. 1920	The war memorial, by L. F. Roslyn, comprises a granite obelisk with a bronze sculpture and plaques. It consists of a square plinth with a moulded cap on five steps. On the plinth is a tapering obelisk with wreaths and plaques. Around the base of the obelisk is a bronze relief depicting soldiers and other participants in the war, including a miner and a nurse. On the plinth is an inscribed plaque.	II*
