= St John's Church, Rawtenstall =

Coordinates: 53.7003°N 2.2735°W

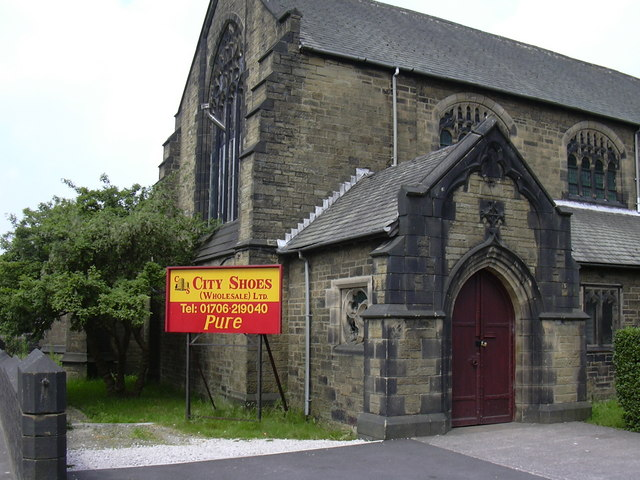
- St John's Church, 2007

- Location in the Borough of Rossendale
- OS grid reference: SD 820 227
- Location: Newchurch Road, Cloughfold, Rawtenstall, Rossendale, Lancashire
- Country: England
- Denomination: Anglican

Architecture
- Functional status: Redundant
- Heritage designation: Grade II
- Designated: 30 November 1984
- Architect: Paley, Austin and Paley
- Architectural type: Church
- Style: Gothic Revival
- Completed: 1890
- Closed: 1976

Specifications
- Capacity: 500
- Materials: Sandstone, slate roof

St John's Church is a redundant Anglican church on Newchurch Road in Cloughfold, Rawtenstall, Rossendale, Lancashire, England. It is recorded in the National Heritage List for England as a designated Grade II listed building.

== History ==
The church was built in 1889–1890 to a design by the Lancaster architects Paley, Austin and Paley. It cost £5,000 (equivalent to £520,000 in 2025), and provided seating for 500 people. The commission resulted from a competition assessed by the architect Ewan Christian. The church was declared redundant on 1 May 1976, and has since been used as a warehouse. Its rood screen was removed to St Nicholas Church, Newchurch.

== Architecture ==
St John's is constructed in sandstone with a slate roof. Its architectural style is Arts and Crafts Perpendicular. The church stands on a north–south axis, and its plan consists of a nave with low aisles, a chancel, a porch, and double transepts. At the southwest is the base of an intended tower incorporating a porch, which rises to a height of only 10 feet (3 m). It contains diagonal buttresses, a doorway above which is blind arcading, and a pyramidal roof.

== See also ==
- Listed buildings in Rawtenstall
- List of works by Paley, Austin and Paley
