= Rawtenstall Library =

Coordinates: 53.7007°N 2.2885°W

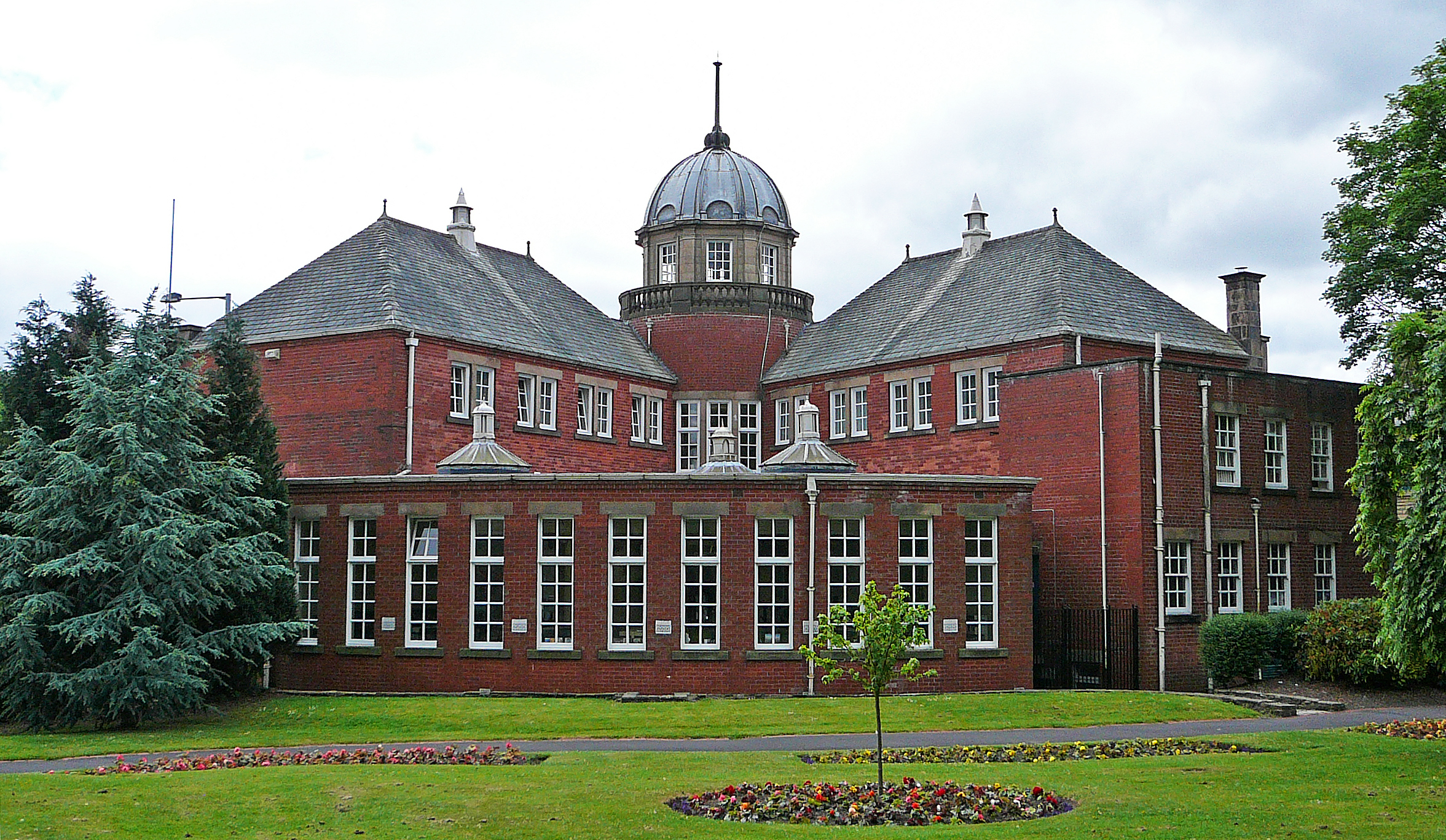
- Rawtenstall Library, 2010
- Interactive map of the Rawtenstall Library area

General information
- Type: Library
- Architectural style: Classical style with some baroque detail
- Location: Queen's Square, Haslingden Rd, Rawtenstall, Rossendale, Lancashire, England
- Opened: 1 June 1907

Design and construction
- Architects: Crouch, Butler & Savage of Birmingham

Listed Building – Grade II
- Official name: District Central Library
- Designated: 7 June 1971
- Reference no.: 1317906

Rawtenstall Library is a Carnegie library located in the town of Rawtenstall, Rossendale, Lancashire, England.

Plans for a new library in Rawtenstall were drawn up in 1903 following the promise of a donation of £6,000 from the Scottish-American industrialist and philanthropist Andrew Carnegie. Originally the building was to have included an assembly room and town hall but the full proposals failed through lack of funding and it was just the library building that was constructed and officially opened in 1907. The library was administered by the Borough of Rawtenstall until Local Government reorganisation in 1974 since when it has been managed by Lancashire County Council.

== The development, opening and early years of the building ==
In 1846 a Mechanics' Institute was founded in Rawtenstall. David Whitehead, a local mill owner and entrepreneur became the president and in 1886 the Rawtenstall Co-operative Society also established a library.

On 11 July 1902 a letter from Andrew Carnegie was read out at a meeting of Rawtenstall Borough Council offering £6000 towards the building of a new library. The Public Libraries Act 1892−1901 were adopted in Rawtenstall on 28 August 1902 and this made it possible to accept the offer.

The design of the building was opened up to competition and out of the twenty two that were submitted the Free Library Committee chose one from Messrs Crouch, Butler and Savage of Birmingham. A ceremony to mark the laying of the corner stones took place on 15 September 1904 and Councillor S Compston's speech lauded the desire "…...to secure for our children, and their children to the third and fourth generation, the blessing of a free lending library and reading room, to be their won, which they will appreciate and be grateful to its founders for in years to come."

Hargreaves Wilkinson was from Burnley was appointed as the first librarian of Rawtenstall in 1905 and the library opened for business in 1906 with 6,000 volumes on the open access system. When the library was officially opened on 1 June 1907 Andrew Carnegie himself attended the event along with local dignitaries and the MP Lewis Harcourt.

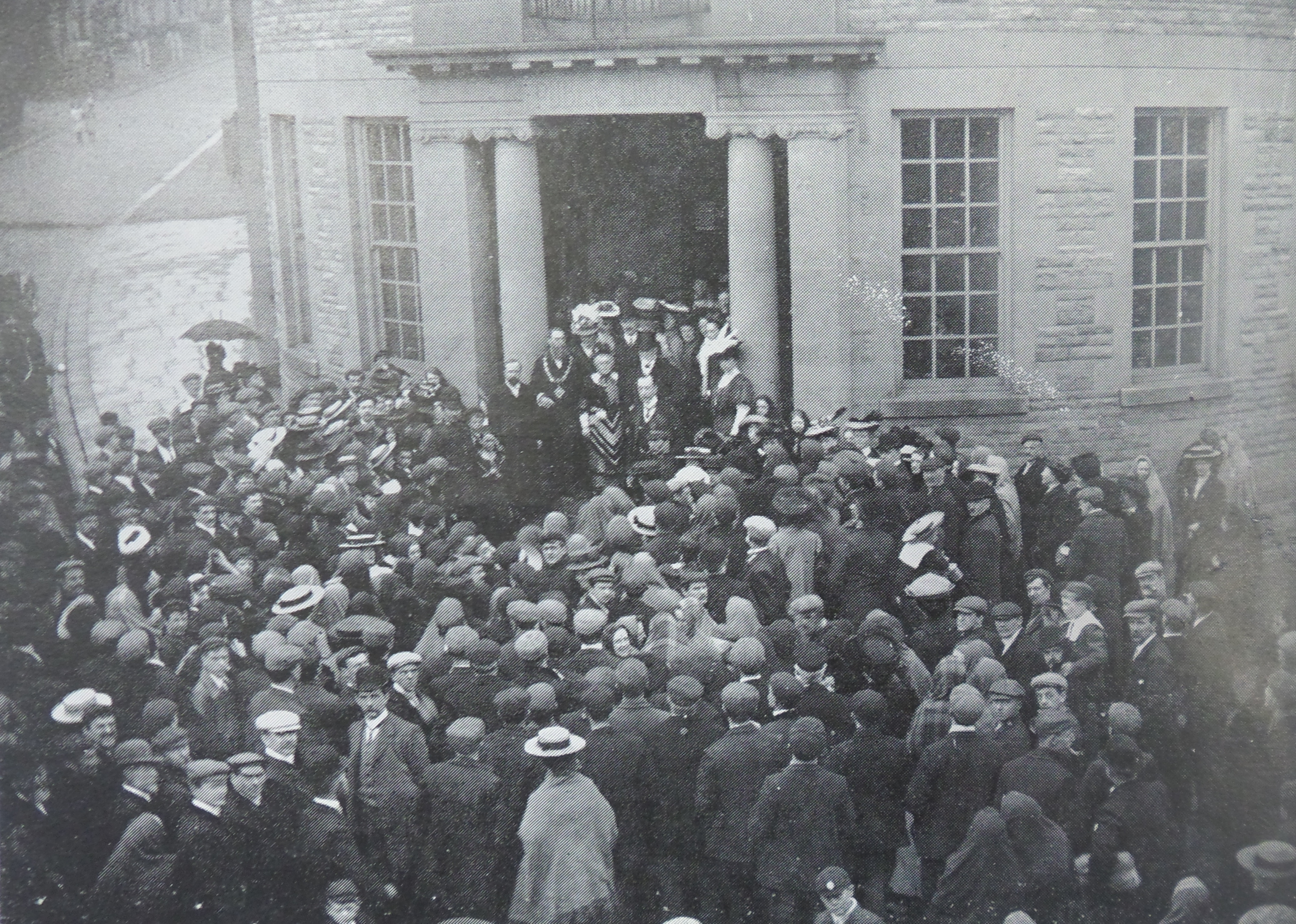
Opening of the Carnegie Library in Rawtenstall on 1 June 1907

Initially lighting was provided by oil lamps but from 1908 to 1909 electricity was used. Increased usage and popularity meant that the lending Library was extended from 1914 (again funded by Carnegie) and 3 years earlier in 1911 a reference library had been opened on the first floor.

== See also ==
- Listed buildings in Rawtenstall

== Notes ==
A detailed chronology of the history of libraries in Rawtenstall appears in Borough of Rawtenstall, Rossendale, Libraries and Museum, 1906−1973. A copy is held in the Lancashire Archives
