= Shrewsbury (disambiguation) =

Shrewsbury is the county town of Shropshire in the United Kingdom, founded c. 800. A number of people, places and other locations have their names deriving from this original place.

== People ==
- Earl of Shrewsbury, in the peerage of England
- Arthur Shrewsbury (1856–1903), English cricketer
- Arthur Shrewsbury (cricketer, born 1874), English cricketer
- Henry L. Shrewsbury (born c. 1847), American politician
- Ralph of Shrewsbury (died 1363), English bishop
- Richard of Shrewsbury, Duke of York (1473–c. 1483), son of King Edward IV
- Robert of Shrewsbury (died 1212), English cleric and judge
- Robert of Shrewsbury (abbot) (died 1168), abbot of Shrewsbury Abbey
- Tom Shrewsbury (born 1995), English cricketer
- William Shrewsbury (1795-1866), British Methodist minister
- William Shrewsbury (cricketer) (1854–1931), English cricketer

== Places ==
=== Australia ===
- Shrewsbury Rock, Queensland

=== Canada ===
- Shrewsbury, Ontario
- Shrewsbury, Quebec

=== Ireland ===
- Shrewsbury Road, Ballsbridge, Dublin

=== Jamaica ===
- Shrewsbury, Portland, a town in Portland Parish

=== United States ===
- Shrewsbury, Kentucky
- Shrewsbury, Louisiana
- Shrewsbury, Massachusetts
- Shrewsbury, Missouri
- Shrewsbury, New Jersey
- Shrewsbury Township, New Jersey
- Shrewsbury, Upper Freehold, New Jersey
- Shrewsbury Township, Lycoming County, Pennsylvania
- Shrewsbury Township, Sullivan County, Pennsylvania
- Shrewsbury Township, York County, Pennsylvania
- Shrewsbury, Pennsylvania, a Borough
- Shrewsbury, Vermont
- Shrewsbury, West Virginia
- Shrewsbury River, a tributary of the Navesink River in New Jersey

=== Thailand ===
- Shrewsbury International School

== Ships ==
- HMS Shrewsbury, the name of various ships of the British Royal Navy
- USS Shrewsbury (SP-70), a United States Navy patrol boat in commission from 1917 to 1919

== Associated with Shrewsbury, England ==
- Battle of Shrewsbury (1403)
- Royal Shrewsbury Hospital
- Shrewsbury (UK Parliament constituency), known as Shrewsbury and Atcham between 1983 and 2024
- Shrewsbury Abbey
- Shrewsbury railway station
- Shrewsbury Abbey railway station, closed 1960
- Shrewsbury School
- Shrewsbury Town F.C.
- Shrewsbury and Atcham, former district
- Shrewsbury, an 1897 novel by Stanley J. Weyman

== Other uses ==
- Shrewsbury cake
- Shrewsbury House, Vicars' Close, Wells, Somerset England
