= Tom Whitehead =

Tom Whitehead may refer to:

- Clay T. Whitehead, known as Tom, United States government official
- Tom Whitehead (rugby league), English rugby league footballer

== See also ==
- Thomas Whitehead (disambiguation)
