= Shrewsbury Township =

Shrewsbury Township may refer to:

- Shrewsbury Township, New Jersey
- Shrewsbury Township, York County, Pennsylvania
- Shrewsbury Township, Sullivan County, Pennsylvania
- Shrewsbury Township, Lycoming County, Pennsylvania

== See also ==
- Shrewsbury, the county town of Shropshire, in the West Midlands region of England
- Shrewsbury (disambiguation)
