= Thomas Whitehead =

Thomas Whitehead may refer to:

- Thomas Whitehead (politician) (1825–1901), politician, lawyer, editor and merchant from Virginia
- Thomas Whitehead (businessman) (1787–1859), business man in Rawtenstall, Lancashire
  - Thomas Whitehead and Brothers
- Thomas Whitehead (cricketer) (1853–1937), English cricketer
- Thomas North Whitehead (1891–1969), English human relations theorist and researcher
- T. H. Whitehead (Thomas Henderson Whitehead, 1851–1933), Scottish banker in Hong Kong
- Tom Whitehead (rugby league), English rugby league player
