= Thomas Whitehead and Brothers =

UK company

Thomas Whitehead and Brothers was a textile business established in Rawtenstall, Lancashire in 1815. It was founded by Thomas with his two brothers, David and Peter. The partnership was dissolved in 1855.

The business had a significant influence on the development of Rawtenstall. They built Lower Mill. They also built a house for themselves, Holly Mount – which was divided into three sections, one for each brother.
