= Holly Mount =

Holly Mount may refer to:

- Holly Mount, Knotty Green, a house in Buckinghamshire, England
- Holly Mount RC Primary School, a school in Bury, Greater Manchester, England
- Holly Mount, a street off Holly Hill, Hampstead in the London Borough of Camden, England
- Holly Mount, a former church in Malvern, Worcestershire, England
- Holly Mount, a row of houses in Rawtenstall, Lancashire, England, built for Thomas Whitehead and Brothers
- Holly Mount School, a former school in Rawtenstall, Lancashire, England (see Listed buildings in Rawtenstall)
- Holly Mount, a house in Retford, Nottinghamshire, England (see Listed buildings in Retford)
- Holly Mount, a house in Sheffield, South Yorkshire, England (see Listed buildings in Sheffield S10)
