= Bacup and Rawtenstall Grammar School =

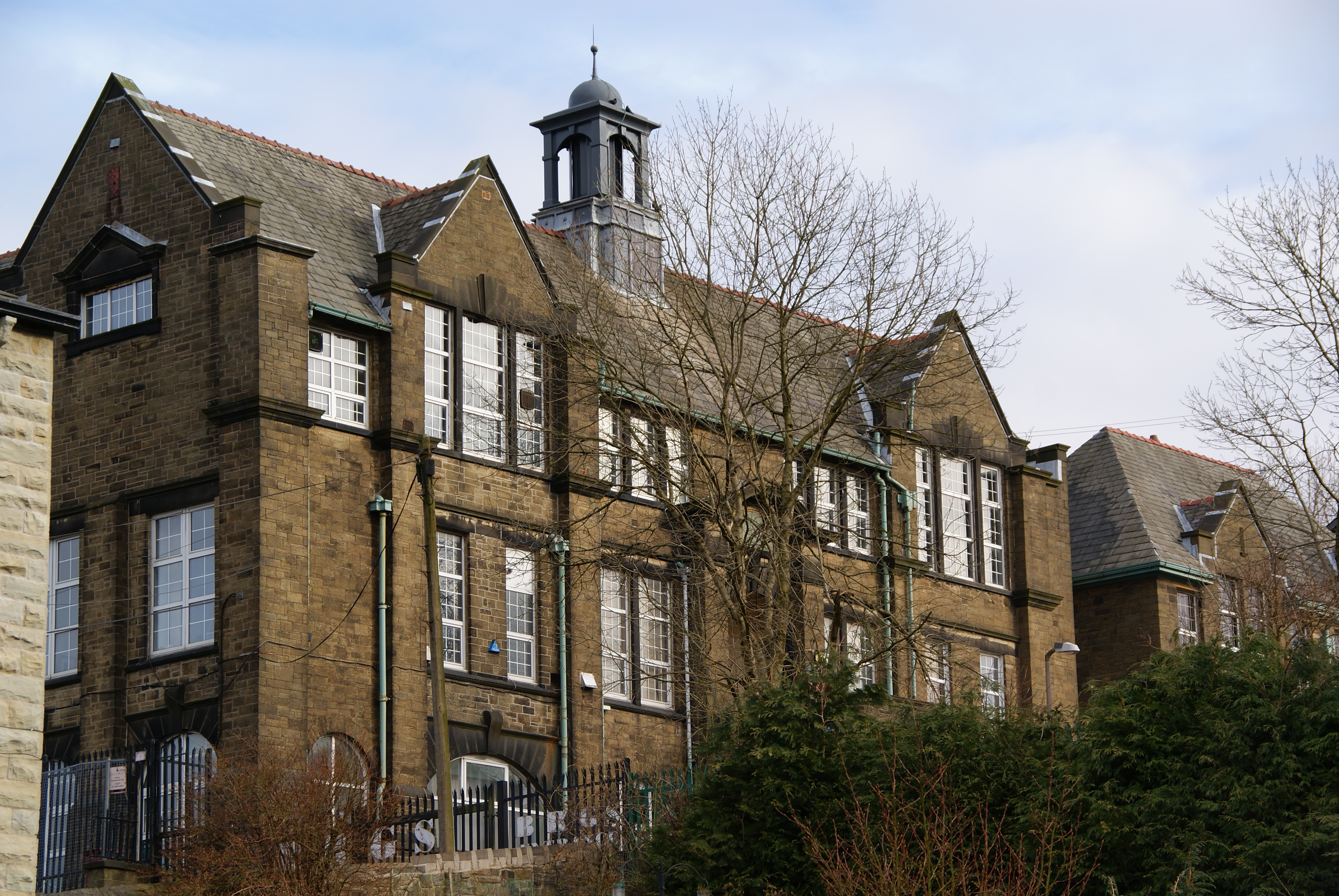

Location
- Glen Road; Waterfoot, Rossendale, Lancashire, BB4 7BJ; England; 53.6934°N 2.2482°W

Information
- Type: Grammar school; Academy
- Motto: Fide et Labore (through faith and labour)
- Established: 1703; 323 years ago (as Newchurch Grammar School); 1913 (modern)
- Local authority: Lancashire County Council
- Trust: Star Academies
- Department for Education URN: 150261 Tables
- Ofsted: Reports
- Chair: Donna Rawding
- Principal: James L Johnstone
- Gender: Coeducational
- Age: 11 to 18
- Enrolment: 1,291 as of August 2023
- Website: http://www.brgs.org.uk/

Bacup and Rawtenstall Grammar School (BRGS) is a selective co-educational academy grammar school in Waterfoot, Rossendale, Lancashire, England. The school is named after the two main towns either side of Waterfoot, Bacup and Rawtenstall.

== History ==
The school was founded in the 18th century as Newchurch Grammar School, opening in 1703 on land bequeathed by John Kershaw in 1701. In the 19th century, records conflated Newchurch Grammar School with the National School of St Nicholas Church, also in Newchurch, suggesting that Kershaw (who died in 1701) bequeathed the land in memory of his wife, Anne, who died in 1709, and that it subsequently opened two years later in 1711. Records from the middle of this century, when Newchurch Grammar School was still in operation, clarified the 1703 date. The tombstone of the couple features two inscriptions about the endowment for the school.

The Kershaws' endowment formed a Trust for the education of local children, including building schools. The first school, built in 1701, was sited on Kershaw's Boothfold estate and was operational until 1787, when it was converted into cottages due to an expanded school for the Trust being built at a place called Bridleway nearby. This school itself was rebuilt on site twice, first in 1830 and again several decades later. The latter rebuild saw the 1830 structure demolished in 1889, but the new buildings would not open until 1890, with a temporary building used in the interim. The ambitious 1890 school, at a cost of £2200, was spearheaded by the headmaster, Rev. R. W. Hay, and considered a vast improvement both functionally (to deal with the hillside) and aesthetically (including a bell tower and collegiate architecture). Two of Hay's sons were Military Cross-awarded flying aces: Hugh Hay (born at the school) and Roger Hay.

In 1890, the management of the school formed a new plan to make it more popular and widen its intake, electing a twelve-member governing body comprising two members each selected by the Bacup and Rawtenstall town councils; one selected by the Newchurch School Board; one selected by Victoria University, to which the school was affiliated; and six local gentlemen. In July 1892, Mr. T. E. Jackson became headmaster.

The school moved location again in the 20th century, to its current site in Waterfoot. The foundation stones for the current site were laid by the mayors of Bacup and Rawtenstall on 1 July 1911 and the buildings opened in 1913; the new name, Bacup and Rawtenstall Grammar School (BRGS), was thusly adopted. The school sits high in the Pennines, with the Edwardian buildings giving a view of the terraces below. It was turbulent in the later 20th century; with no new income following the Second World War, parents' associations at the school petitioned the Secretary of State throughout the following decades to give it control of its finances separate to the local authority, twice being awarded such. In 1989, on the second such occasion, the school accepted the reprieve, and used money to plan buildings for the Sixth Form. In 1988, Martyn Morris had been appointed headmaster; remaining in post into the 21st century, he was only the fifth headmaster over a span of three centuries at the school. In the 1997 Birthday Honours, Martyn Morris, who had been a government adviser on education under four Secretaries of State during his time at BRGS, was made an OBE for services to education.

Martyn Morris retired in December 2004, with Marc Morris (no relation) joining as headmaster in April 2005. Marc Morris then left to become headmaster of Sha Tin College in Hong Kong in July 2011 and the post was taken by Alan Porteous in 2012. Longstanding teacher Trevor Elkington served as interim headmaster.

Previously a foundation school administered by Lancashire County Council, in September 2012 Bacup and Rawtenstall Grammar School converted to academy status. The school then became part of the Star Academies trust in September 2023.

== Admissions ==
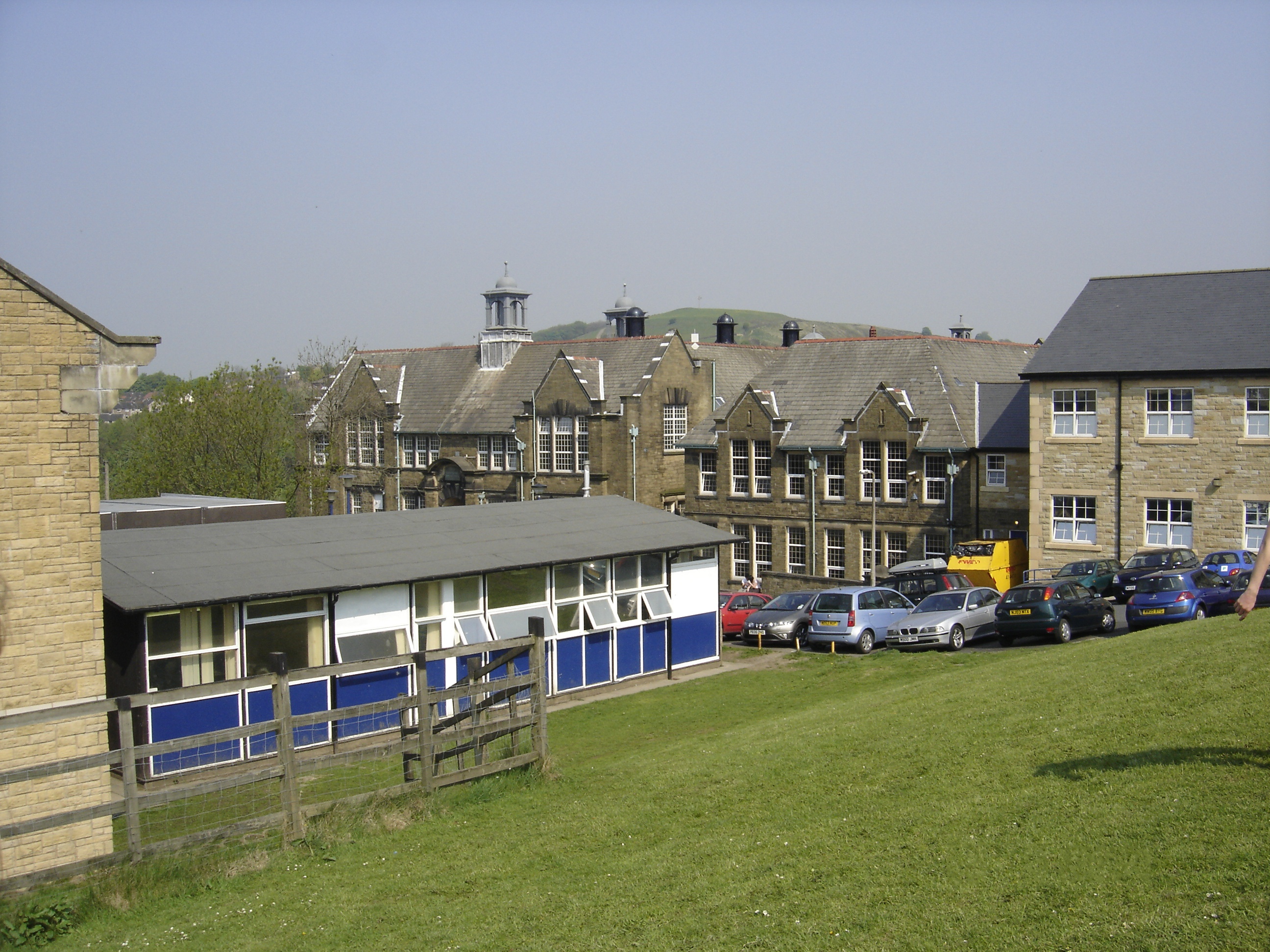
View of the school in 2006

One of only four grammar schools in Lancashire following the mass closure under Margaret Thatcher, the school continues its initial aim to educate local children. Pupils applying from Rossendale area primary schools are given preference. The school, a highly popular state school, administers its own entrance examination, rather than the eleven-plus. Highly competitive, it still attracts students who commute from cities and towns around the north of England, including as far as Liverpool and Bradford in the 1990s.

The school is attended by approximately 1,300 students, split between the lower school (Years 7 to 11), which has 180 pupils per year (in six form groups of thirty pupils each), and the sixth form (Years 12 and 13) with approximately 200 students per year in several tutor groups.

Entry to the sixth form does not require an examination, but is conditional on the student having gained at least two grade 5 and two grade 6 GCSEs, and at least grade 4 in Maths and English Language. Most of the lower school pupils stay on to become sixth form students, with more students taken from other secondary schools.

== Academic performance ==
In keeping with its grammar school status, BRGS has consistently produced strong academic results throughout its modern history, with GCSE and A-Level pass rates above 80% for the duration; in the 1990s, the success was credited to the majority of staff serving for decades having created stability in standards of teaching.

The school ranks highly in British School league tables. In September 2013 it was rated as a 5 star school by Trinity Mirror. The majority of students continue on to further education, and the school has a long history of sending students to the Russell Group and Oxbridge Universities.

In 2015, BRGS was academically ranked in the top 10 in the country for English Baccalaureate performance.

== School life ==
=== Extracurricular activities ===
==== Sport ====
BRGS has a long sporting history. Pupils have flourished in a variety of sports, with many going on to play Lancashire League cricket at one point. The school produced six England international hockey players, including an England Schools captain, in the 1970s and 80s, and four England international handball players in the 2000s. Still, BRGS is considered "traditionally a soccer school"; it has seen routine success in the sport and sent its boys' teams to train with Valencia CF in the 2010s. Into the 2020s one of its coaches, Mr. Baird, helps to organise the Rossendale Schools' football league.

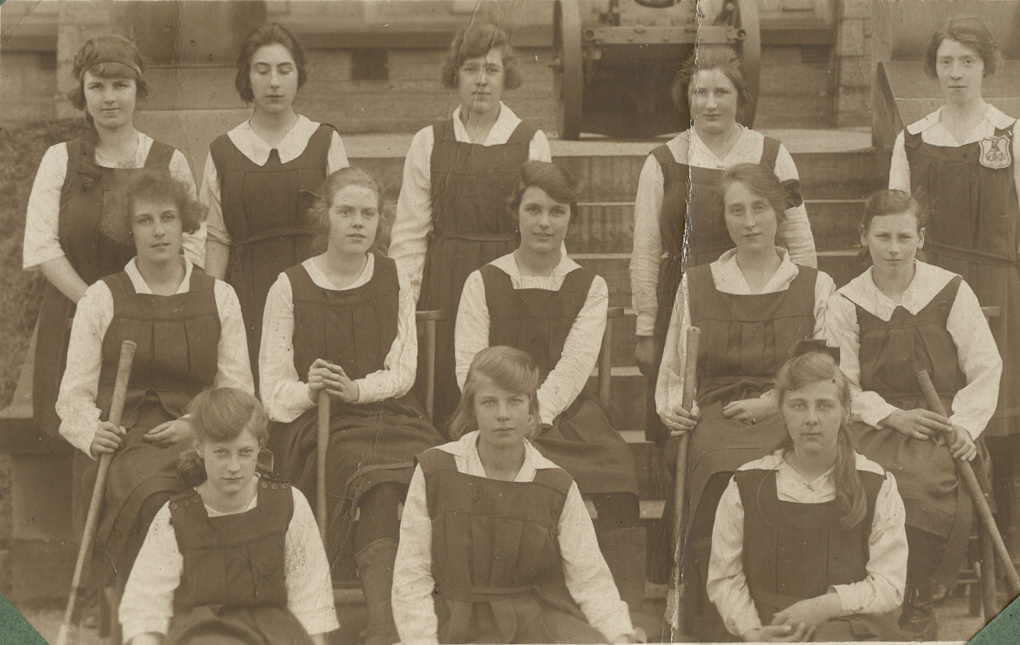
The school's 1920-21 hockey first team

Pupils have taken part in athletics since the school's 1913 inception. It has had girls' hockey and netball teams, and mixed swimming teams, since at least the 1920s. Since at least the 1930s it has had boys' football and cricket, girls' tennis, and mixed gymnastics teams. Cycling, rugby, rounders, chess, cross-country and basketball were introduced in the 1940s and 50s, as were second teams and age-group teams for many of the established sports, with badminton coming in the 1960s. During teaching disputes, boys' sport suffered, but recovered in the 1990s. In the 1990s, sports began to be organised by year group, with orienteering added, as well as non-competitive clubs for table tennis and climbing.

Sport, both against other schools and inter-form, had been covered in the school newspaper (The Squirrel) since at least 1930, but in the 1970s a separate school magazine dedicated to sport, "Penny Sports", was run. By the 1980s, BRGS sport coverage was again under the remit of The Squirrel. The 1980s also saw the introduction of boys' hockey.

The Sports Hall, for extracurricular sports as well as PE, was opened by Prince Edward, Earl of Wessex in 2005.

==== Duke of Edinburgh Award scheme ====
The school is a facilitator of The Duke of Edinburgh's Award. A merit board for gold award recipients hangs in the main hall and was unveiled during a school visit by Prince Edward (a son of the Duke of Edinburgh).

=== School culture and Ofsted reports ===
In the 1990s, pupils at the school were said to be "unaffected, delightfully self-contained youngsters with accents stronger than Victoria Wood's".

In 2016, BRGS was rated "outstanding" by education standards overseer Ofsted, the highest possible rating. It was rated outstanding in each sub-discipline, making it the best rating possible. The sixth form also received the highest possible rating, with the report saying that the school's culture creates "well-rounded citizens". There were recommendations, however, to find ways to improve the secondary school pupils' verbal communication skills, and to ensure everyone could take part in extracurricular activities.

In 2022, the school was rated overall "inadequate", the lowest Ofsted rating, and put under special measures with a demand for immediate safeguarding reform. The 2022 report said that while education standards remained high and pupils were successful in extracurricular activities, welfare was terrible. It said that at the school a culture of bullying, racism, misogyny, "harmful sexual behaviour", and homophobia prevailed, and that pupils, students and parents had given up on reporting issues due to staff inaction. One area of education was rated poorly: failings in social and sex education, including at the sixth form, which contributed to the harmful sexual behaviour becoming "an accepted feature of school life" at BRGS. Pupils also failed to recognise that peers different to themselves are their equals. The report concluded that despite good grades and high ambitions, pupils leaving the school and students leaving the sixth form "are ill-prepared to take up their roles as responsible citizens in a modern Britain". A local councillor said that "Young people will have been traumatised by what they have experienced during their time there. They may never get over it".

The school was inspected on 9 and 10 June 2026 under Ofsted’s new framework and ‘report card’ grading system and was rated exceptional in all Ofsted categories, the highest rating possible. At the time of the report BRGS is one of two schools nationally to be rated so highly across 7 areas.

== Notable former pupils and students ==
=== Arts and Entertainment ===
- Natalie Casey, actress (Hollyoaks, Two Pints of Lager and a Packet of Crisps)
- Pattie Coldwell, presenter
- Agyness Deyn, supermodel and actress, 2007 model of the year
- Miles Higson, actor (Hollyoaks)
- Betty Jackson, fashion designer, (Absolutely Fabulous, Marks & Spencer Autograph collection)
- Phil Lester, BBC Radio 1 presenter and YouTuber
- Alwyn Mellor, Royal Opera House soprano
- Ernest Tomlinson, light music composer

=== Sportspeople ===
- Tommy Bell, rugby union player (Sale Sharks, London Wasps, England U18)
- Kristan Bromley, Olympic skeleton racer and coach, Skeleton World Cup champion 2004 & 2008, FIBT World Championships 2008 champion
- Mollie Campbell, basketball player (Leicester Riders, England, Great Britain), 2018 Commonwealth Games silver
- Nick Clark, hockey player (England, Schools captain) and coach (England U16, U18, U21,)
- Ben Hanley, racing driver, 2022 Asian Le Mans Series champion
- Rachel Henry, netball player (Loughborough Lightning, England U17 vice captain, U19 vice captain, England)
- Gordon Hill, football referee
- Jessica Leyden, Olympic rower, 2017 World Rowing Championships bronze, 2022 European Rowing Championships gold, 2022 World Championships bronze
- Sam Minihan, footballer (Halifax Town)
- Carlo Nash, footballer (Manchester City, Everton)
- Winston Place, cricketer (Lancashire, England)
- Keira Walsh, footballer (Manchester City, Barcelona, England captain 2018, Great Britain), UEFA Women's Euro 2022 champion

=== Other ===
- Sir John Egan, industrialist (Jaguar Cars, BAA, Egan Report)
- Rt Revd Jack Nicholls, Bishop of Sheffield from 1997 to 2008 and Bishop of Lancaster from 1990 to 1997
- Prof Peter Ormerod, physician
- John Ashworth Ratcliffe, radio physicist
- Sir Paul Stephenson, Metropolitan Police Commissioner 2008–11

== Former staff ==
=== Notable former teachers ===
- Trevor Park, former MP for South East Derbyshire
- Paul Patrick, LGBT rights activist

=== Headmasters ===
Headmasters chronology
Name	School	Years
Rev. Thomas Wright Greenall	Newchurch	1876–1879
Matthias James Stephenson	Newchurch	1879
Rev. Hubert Edwards Chapman	Newchurch	1880
Rev. Reynell Wreford Hay	Newchurch	?–1892
Thomas E. Jackson	Newchurch, BRGS	1892–1921
Edmund H. Holden	BRGS	1921–1948
William Copley	BRGS	1949–1960
Philip Clark	BRGS	1969–1987
Martyn R. Morris	BRGS	1988–2004
Marc Morris	BRGS	2005–2011
Alan Porteous	BRGS	2012–2022
James Johnstone	BRGS	2022-?
