= St Paul's Church, Constable Lee =

Coordinates: 53.7102°N 2.2886°W

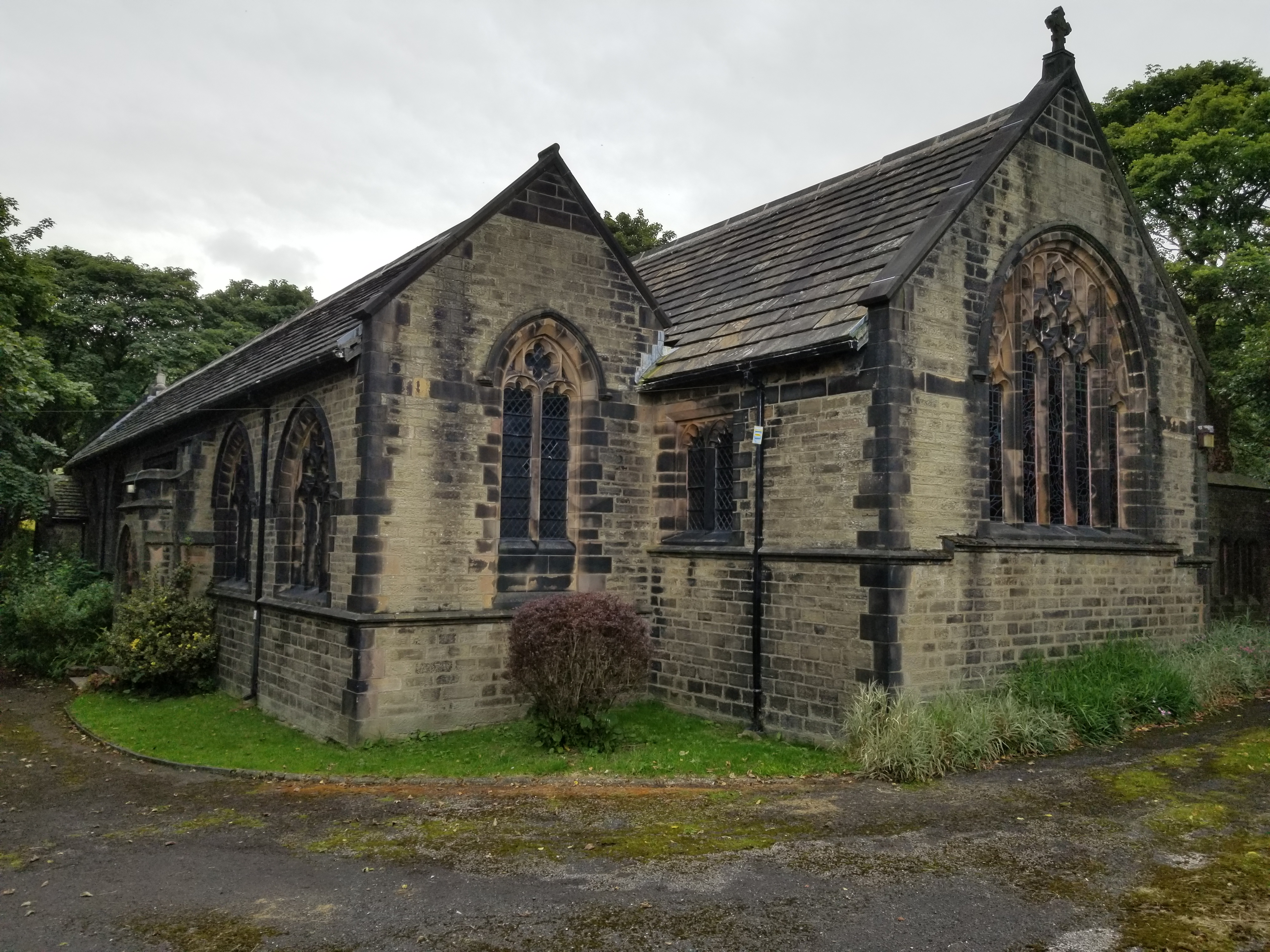

- Location in the Borough of Rossendale
- OS grid reference: SD 811 238
- Location: Burnley Road, Constable Lee, Rawtenstall, Lancashire
- Country: England
- Denomination: Anglican
- Website: https://www.achurchnearyou.com/church/16102/

History
- Status: Parish church
- Dedication: Saint Paul

Architecture
- Functional status: Active
- Heritage designation: Grade II
- Designated: 30 November 1984
- Architect: Austin and Paley
- Architectural type: Church
- Style: Gothic Revival
- Groundbreaking: 1901
- Completed: 1903

Specifications
- Materials: Sandstone, slate roofs

Administration
- Province: York
- Diocese: Manchester
- Archdeaconry: Bolton
- Deanery: Rossendale
- Parish: St Paul, Constable Lee

St Paul's Church is in Burnley Road, Constable Lee, Rawtenstall, Lancashire, England. It is an active Anglican parish church in the deanery of Rossendale, the archdeaconry of Bolton, and the diocese of Manchester. The church is recorded in the National Heritage List for England as a designated Grade II listed building.

== History ==
The church was built between 1901 and 1903 to a design by the Lancaster architects Austin and Paley, providing seating for 332 people. The initial estimated cost was £5,000, but it finally cost £7,000 (equivalent to £740,000 in 2025).

== Architecture and fittings ==
St Paul's is a low building standing at the top of a hill. It is constructed in sandstone with slate roofs. The plan consists of a six-bay nave, a south aisle, two south porches, a chancel, and a northeast vestry. The planned central tower was never built. The porch in the first bay of the aisle has a niche containing a statue above the doorway. The windows along the sides of the church have two, three or four lights containing Geometric tracery; some are arched, others have flat heads. The west window has four lights, and the east window has five; both contain Perpendicular tracery.

The seven-bay arcade is carried on octagonal piers. The pulpit is carved with images of the Four Evangelists. The font consists of an octagonal tub with no stem, and it has a tall carved cover.

== See also ==
- Listed buildings in Rawtenstall
- List of ecclesiastical works by Austin and Paley (1895–1914)
