= Alder Grange School =

Alder Grange School and Sixth Form Centre

Location
- Calder Road; Rossendale, Lancashire, BB4 8HW; England; 53°42′30″N 2°16′59″W

Information
- Type: Community school
- Motto: ‘Once an Alder Granger always an Alder Granger’
- Local authority: Lancashire
- Department for Education URN: 119722 Tables
- Ofsted: Reports
- Headteacher: Joanna Griffiths
- Gender: Coeducational
- Age: 11 to 18
- Enrolment: 830
- Houses: Cribden, Whinberry and Swinshaw (Red, Green and Blue)
- Colours: Light blue, dark blue
- Website: aldergrange.com

Alder Grange School is a secondary school and sixth form located in the east Lancashire town of Rawtenstall, England.

== Facilities ==
The school's sporting facilities include a gymnasium, a 3G pitch with astroturf, and Alder Grange Sports Centre - a fitness room with sports hall. The sports hall opened in 2008 which includes various facilities which include badminton courts, table tennis tables, outdoor football space and basketball courts.

Elsewhere, the school has one cafeteria, five science labs, four specialised technology rooms including a kitchen for food technology, a music room and one IT suite.

The school is closely linked to school technology provider Promethean and has taken part in trials of new products, as well as frequently using current ones in day-to-day lessons.

== Awards and status ==
It previously held specialist school status as a Technology College (since 1993) and a second award in Applied Learning. In 2007 it was designated a High Performing Specialist School. The specialist school programme ended in 2013.

== Extra curricular activities ==
Apart from academic work, students at Alder Grange can participate in other activities. These include the Music School (includes extra instrument lessons or taking part in school productions such as a rendition of Grease) and formerly the Duke of Edinburgh award scheme (bronze to silver).

== ag6 ==
In January 2011, Alder Grange School opened its new sixth form centre for 16- to 18-year-olds, giving its students an easier choice when they carry on full-time education after 16. The building had a construction cost of £6 million, and offers around 100 student places per academic year.

=== Facilities ===
Facilities at the new ag6 building includes a catering kitchen and café, media studio with camera equipment, a science laboratory, a student social area with library, staff lounge and horticulture equipment.

=== Courses ===
At ag6, students can take academic A levels, vocational BTEC (or similar) qualifications, or a mixture of both. Courses available include classic academic courses such as English literature, mathematics, sociology, the law, to vocational ones such as performing arts and creative media.

== Alderbeat ==
Alder Grange School launched its own internal radio station named Alderbeat in February 2012, after purchasing high-end radio equipment. The station was broadcast on 87.9FM and was played throughout the school. The station manager was an Alder Grange student. Alderbeat was discontinued in March 2017.
