= Sarah Ann Gill =

Barbadian national hero

Sarah Ann Gill (probably 1780 – 25 February 1866) was a social and religious leader in Barbados during the era of slavery. By an act of the Barbadian Parliament in 1998, she was named a National Hero of Barbados.

== Biography ==
She was born of a black mother and a white father (Jordan), and baptised with the name Ann. The circumstances of her birth disqualified her from any meaningful participation in social and economic life, in a society which was based on racism. In Barbadian society, anyone with a taint of African ancestry, however distant, was considered the natural inferior of all persons of unmixed European descent. Sarah married Alexander George Gill, like her, of mixed ancestry, and inherited property from him at his death when she was 28 years old. The couple had one son who, apparently, died before reaching full adulthood.

When the Methodist Church sent missionaries to Barbados early in the 19th century, Sarah embraced this faith and when white planters succeeded in ousting the missionaries from Barbados, she opened her home as a church and kept the faith going, against physical abuse — at one time shots were fired at her home. She donated the land on which the first Methodist Church was built in Barbados. For her exploits in standing firm against oppression in a society in which she was unlikely to find support firstly, as a non-white person, and, secondly, as a woman; she was named as a national heroine. The name Sarah was conferred on her by the Methodist Church in gratitude for her service and in recognition of the pivotal role she played, like Sarah of the Bible, in establishing an alternative to the white-dominated Church of England in Barbados.

Like many whose lives and value to society are not always fully appreciated, the significance of Mrs. Sarah Ann Gill's contribution must be measured in terms of the context of the role played by Methodists at that time. That was her chosen faith, hence the focal point of hostility by powerful forces against its challenge to the existing social order.

Methodism was brought to Barbados in 1788 by Dr Thomas Coke, a driving force behind early Methodist missionary activity. By 1793, Methodists were often viewed by the Barbadian upper classes as anti-slavery agitators and Methodist missionaries regarded as agents of the England-based Anti-Slavery Society.

Gill was a Free Coloured and a member of this church in Barbados. In his "Methodism: 200 Years in Barbados", author Francis Woodbine Blackman wrote that the first record of her association with Methodism was in 1819 when she made a donation of ten pounds sterling towards the building of the first Methodist chapel in Bridgetown, which was to be constructed of stone. Records show she became a full member in 1820.

In October 1823, the Chapel building was destroyed by a mob of white rioters and the Methodist missionary Rev William Shrewsbury and his pregnant wife were forced to flee for their lives to St Vincent.

Sarah Ann and her sister-in-law, Miss Christiana Gill, were among the leaders of this church who subsequently opened their homes as meeting places for church members.

A 28-year-old widow, Sarah Ann held regular worship services in the face of continued and active persecution. These included threats to burn down her house and two prosecutions in the law courts for holding "illegal" meetings. The latter came about as a result of the Conventicle Act 1664 which forbade assembly of more than five persons for divine worship unless in a licensed meeting place and led by a licensed preacher.

Sarah Ann was persecuted continuously for one year with threats of grievous bodily harm, questioned by magistrates about supposedly having guns and ammunition in her home, and finally, prosecuted by the House of Assembly. On each occasion, and at her own expense, she not only defended herself and defied the authorities, but also took the extraordinary step of continuing to hold services in her home.

Governor Henry Warde, censured by the Secretary of State for inaction, was forced to use soldiers to ensure the safety of Sarah Ann, her household and property when the Secret Committee of Public Safety (ringleaders of the persecution) declared that on 19 October 1824, they would destroy her home. Instead, frustrated by the Governor, they could only burn her in effigy.

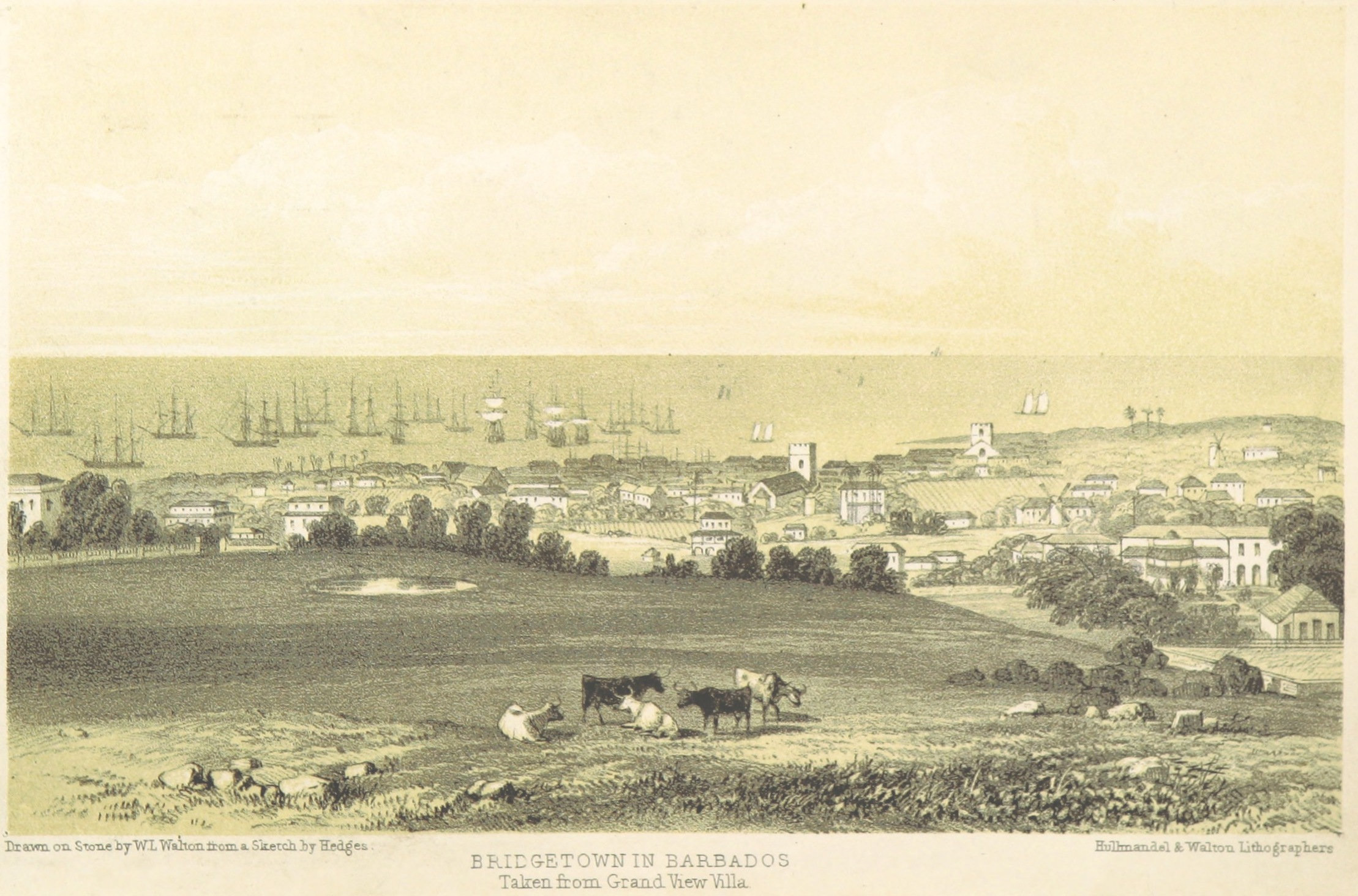
View of Bridgetown, Barbados in 1848

In April 1825, when Rev Moses Rayner was re-appointed to Barbados, he sought, by letter, Sarah Ann's advice about his safety. She replied: "I don't advise you to come, but if it was me, I should come." He returned and built a chapel on the site of the present James Street Church on land provided by Sarah Ann at a minimal cost with payment spread over eight years. The new Church was built in 1848 and Sarah Ann is buried in the churchyard there.

Inevitably, the outrages of the period reached the House of Commons in England and ignited debate of far-reaching consequences. On 25 June 1825, the members "... deemed it their duty to declare that they view(ed) with utmost indignation (the) scandalous and daring violation of the law and (supported by His Majesty's) ... securing ample protection and religious toleration to all ... of His Majesty's dominions."

== Legacy ==
The Ann Gill Memorial Church at Eagle Hall is named after Sarah Ann. A large, wooden structure built in 1893, it was replaced by a new Gill Memorial Church built at Fairfield Road, Black Rock, Saint Michael, Barbados in the late 1980s.

Her courage, perseverance, and commitment to religious freedom set Sarah Ann Gill apart even among the countless devoted Christian stewards of her day. Many primary schools in Barbados now commemorate her annually by celebrating National Heroes Day. An annual "Sarah Ann Gill Memorial Lecture" has been held since 2007.

== Notes ==
- Staff writer (11 April 2010). "Cave Hill to bring Barbados' lone female hero to the stage". Barbados Advocate. Archived from the original on 2012-02-26.
- Staff writer (25 April 2010). "Sarah Ann Gill called 'The mother of our nation'". Barbados Advocate. Archived from the original on 2012-02-26.
- S., A. (27 April 2010). "Tribute in song for national heroine tomorrow April 28 (2010)". Barbados Advocate. Archived from the original on 2012-02-26.
