= Rawtenstall Town Hall =

Municipal building in Rawtenstall, Lancashire, England

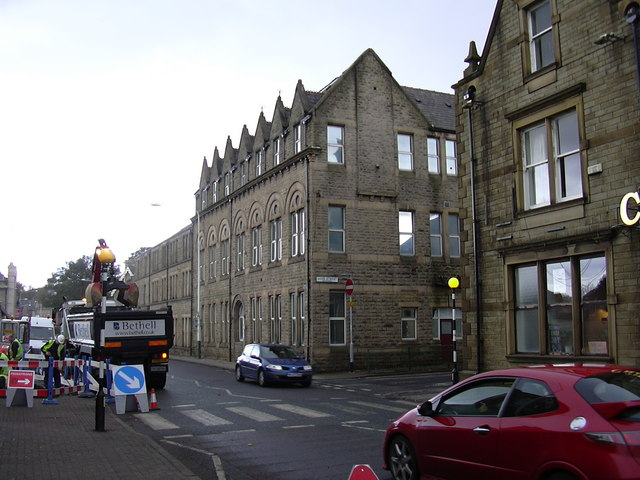
- The building in 2008

- Shown in Lancashire
- 53.7009°N 2.2847°W
- Location: Bacup Road, Rawtenstall, Roasendale, Lancashire, England

History
- Built: 1876

Site notes
- Architectural style: Italianate style

Rawtenstall Town Hall is a municipal building in Bacup Road, Rawtenstall, Rossendale, Lancashire, England. The building, which served as the offices and meeting place of Rawtenstall Borough Council and has been converted for commercial use, is a locally listed building.

== History ==
The building was commissioned by a group of local businessmen as a stock exchange. The site they selected was open land on the north side of Bacup Road. The new building was designed in the Italianate style, built in rubble masonry and was completed in 1876. The original design involved an asymmetric main frontage of four bays facing onto Bacup Road. The left-hand bay featured a round headed doorway with an archivolt and a hood mould. The other bays on the ground floor were fenestrated by pairs of square headed windows, while the bays on the first floor were fenestrated by pairs of square headed windows surmounted by round headed hood moulds containing roundels and other carvings. There was a row of dormer windows at attic level.

The building was acquired by Rawtenstall local board of health in 1889, and, after Rawtenstall was incorporated as a municipal borough in 1891, the new council adopted the building as its town hall. In 1910, after the responsibilities of the council had been expanded, the building was extended by an extra three bays to the left in the same style, giving it symmetry and connecting it to the headquarters of the municipal tramway. A further extension, at the rear of the complex, was completed in 1964.

The town hall was the venue for Rhodes Boyson's interview to become a teacher at Lea Bank Secondary Modern School at nearby Cloughfold in 1950. Boyson got the job and ultimately went on to become Minister of State for Local Government in Margaret Thatcher's government. Thatcher briefly visited the town hall herself and met the mayor in August 1979.

The town hall continued to serve as the headquarters of the borough council for much of the 20th century, but ceased to be the local seat of government when the enlarged Rossendale Borough Council was formed in 1974. However, the council continued to use the building for the delivery of some services until 2012.

In May 2015, a proposal was put forward to demolish the building, but ultimately, in the face of local opposition, only the 1964 extension and the municipal tramway offices were demolished, and, instead, a major programme of works to restore the town hall was implemented. The works were commissioned by the RTB partnership, a joint venture between Rossendale Council, Barnfield Investment Properties and Together Housing Group, and were completed in February 2019. Together Housing moved into the building, but, in the light of post-pandemic working practices, vacated the building again in October 2021. In June 2023, the council announced plans for a skills centre in the building.
