= Arthur Shrewsbury (cricketer, born 1874) =

English cricketer

Personal information
- Full name: Arthur Shrewsbury
- Born: 4 July 1874; Nottingham, Nottinghamshire, England
- Died: 6 October 1917 (aged 43); Nottingham, Nottinghamshire, England
- Batting: Right-handed
- Bowling: Right-arm medium
- Relatives: William Shrewsbury (father), Arthur Shrewsbury (uncle)

Domestic team information
- Years: Team
- 1892: Nottinghamshire

Career statistics
Competition	First-class
Matches	3
Runs scored	63
Batting average	31.50
100s/50s	–/–
Top score	31*
Balls bowled	70
Wickets	–
Bowling average	–
5 wickets in innings	–
10 wickets in match	–
Best bowling	–
Catches/stumpings	1/–
- Source: Cricinfo, 3 October 2010

Arthur Shrewsbury (4 July 1874 – 6 October 1917) was an English cricketer. Shrewsbury was a right-handed batsman who bowled right-arm medium pace. He was born in Nottingham.

Shrewsbury made his first-class debut for Nottinghamshire against Sussex in the 1892 County Championship. He played 2 further first-class matches for the county in 1892, which came against Gloucestershire and Somerset. In his 3 first-class matches, he scored 63 runs at a batting average of 31.50, with a high score of 31*. In the field he took a single catch.

He died in Nottingham on 6 October 1917 and was buried at All Hallows Church in Gedling.

== Family ==
His father William played first-class cricket for Nottinghamshire, as did his uncle Arthur who also played Test cricket for England.
