= Colin Blant =

English footballer

Personal information
- Full name: Colin Blant
- Date of birth: 7 October 1946 (age 80)
- Place of birth: Rawtenstall, England
- Positions: Defender; centre forward

Youth career
- 1962–1963: Rossendale United

Senior career*
Years	Team	Apps	(Gls)
1964–1970	Burnley	53	(7)
1970–1972	Portsmouth	64	(1)
1972–1974	Rochdale	51	(0)
1974–1976	Darlington	89	(0)
1976	Grimsby	9	(0)
1976–1977	Workington	21	(0)
- * Club domestic league appearances and goals as of 15:58, 4 August 2008 (UTC)

Colin Blant (born 7 October 1946) is an English retired professional footballer who played for six Football League clubs, in a decade long career that spanned the 1960s and 1970s.

== Career ==
Born in Rawtenstall, Blant started his career with local club Rossendale United before joining his first Football League club Burnley in 1964. He became a regular for the reserve team over the following two years before making his first-team debut, which came in the 1–1 draw with Shrewsbury Town on 14 September 1966. Blant had an extended run in the Burnley side during 1967, playing at centre forward in place of the injured Willie Irvine. He netted three goals in his first three matches but was later converted into a central defender and regularly partnered Colin Waldron in defence during the 1968–69 campaign. In total, Blant scored 9 goals in 62 league appearances for the Turf Moor club before joining Portsmouth for a fee of £5,000 in 1970.

After two years at Fratton Park, during which he scored one goal in 64 league matches, he moved to Rochdale on a free transfer, a move he later regretted. After making 51 appearances for Rochdale, he moved to Darlington in January 1974. He spent two and a half seasons with the club and was a regular first-team player, starting 89 league matches. A short spell with Grimsby Town followed before he joined his final club Workington in November 1976. The season was disastrous for the side as they finished bottom of the Fourth Division and their subsequent application for re-election was unsuccessful. Blant was released by the club in May 1977 and retired from professional football. In retirement he was a newsagent and a property developer and worked as a coach at the Rochdale Centre of Excellence.
