= Longholme Methodist Church =

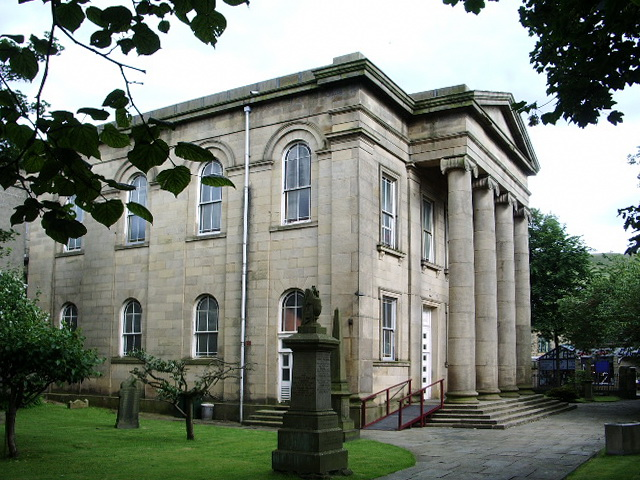
- The building in 2007
- Longholme Methodist Church
- OS grid reference: SD 81201 22770
- Country: England
- Denomination: Methodist
- Website: Rossendale Circuit

History
- Status: Church
- Founder(s): Thomas, David and Peter Whitehead
- Dedicated: 18 March 1842

Architecture
- Functional status: Active
- Style: Greek Revival
- Groundbreaking: 1840
- Completed: End 1842

Specifications
- Materials: Stone

Longholme Methodist Church is Methodist church in Rawtenstall, Rossendale, Lancashire, England. 53.70103°N 2.28619°W The current building is the third used for methodist worship in Rawtenstall. It cost £7,000 and was opened on 18 March 1842. It provided 1300 seats for worshippers. The building was designed by John Simpson of Leeds. It was financed by the brothers Thomas, David and Peter Whitehead, local businessmen who are buried in a shared grave in the churchyard.
