= Peter Ormerod =

English chest physician

Professor Peter Ormerod FRCP FRCPE FRCPGlas
- Born: 28 August 1950
- Died: 29 January 2019
- Citizenship: United Kingdom
- Occupation: Chest physician
- Spouse: Pauline Morris
- Children: 2

Lawrence Peter Ormerod (born 1950) was an English chest physician.

Ormerod was educated at Bacup and Rawtenstall Grammar School. He qualified as a doctor in 1974 and gained a DSc in 2000 for his work researching tuberculosis.

He is a Professor of Respiratory Medicine at the University of Manchester and at the University of Central Lancashire, and was a consultant for BMI Healthcare at the Beardwood Hospital in Lancashire.

He was appointed to the Joint Tuberculosis Committee in 1987 and served as its chair from 1995 to 2000. He was a consultant adviser on Tuberculosis to the United Kingdom Government's Department of Health, from 1997 to 2003.

He was President of the British Thoracic Society for the year 2008–2009.
