= Newchurch, Lancashire =

Village in Lancashire, England

Coordinates: 53.699°N 2.253°W

Newchurch
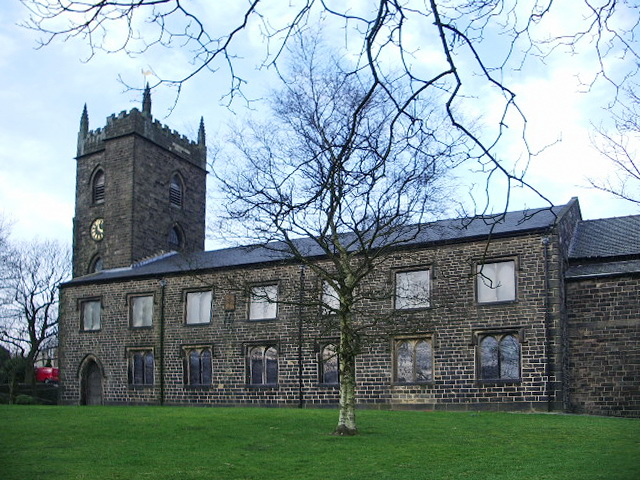
- Parish Church of St Nicholas with St John and St Michael in 2008

- Location within Rossendale Location within Lancashire
- OS grid reference: SD832225
- District: Rossendale
- Shire county: Lancashire
- Region: North West
- Country: England
- Sovereign state: United Kingdom
- Post town: Rossendale
- Postcode district: BB4
- Dialling code: 01706
- Police: Lancashire
- Fire: Lancashire
- Ambulance: North West
- UK Parliament: Rossendale and Darwen

Newchurch or Newchurch in Rossendale is a village within the borough of Rossendale in Lancashire, England. It is around one mile east of Rawtenstall and half a mile north of Waterfoot.

The village has a mixture of large detached houses and farmhouses, and smaller semi-detached housing on Staghills Council Estate where the majority of the village's population lives. There are two large manor houses, Heightside, a nursing home for those with mental disorders and Ashlands, a care home for the elderly.

It is part of the Rossendale and Darwen constituency.

== History ==
Newchurch is one of the earliest settlements in the Forest of Rossendale, the village developed around St Nicholas church, first built in 1511. The township of Newchurch stretched from Bacup to Rawtenstall, and in 1511 it was recorded as having a population of 1,000 people.

Newchurch-in-Rossendale was formerly a chapelry in the parish of Whalley, in 1866 Newchurch became a separate civil parish, in 1894 the parish was abolished to form Bacup and Rawtenstall. In 1891 the parish had a population of 1190. It is now in the unparished area of Rawtenstall.

The village is built on a hill, Seat Naze. On this hill there is a stone circle with many rumours circulating about its original use. A mobile phone mast was erected on top of Seat Naze in the 1990s.

The hill also has a network of caves running underneath it, used for quarrying in the early 1900s. They stretch from Newchurch to Crawshawbooth around 4 miles away.

The original building for Bacup and Rawtenstall Grammar School was in Newchurch, on Turnpike. This site was used between 1701 until 1913 until they moved to their current site in Waterfoot. The site was then used as St Peter's RC Primary School until they moved to a new site in the 1970s. It remained derelict until 2000, when it was demolished and the land was used to build a house.

After World War II the village was expanded with the construction of new homes, including a council estate at Staghills, and during the 1960s many of the historic buildings were demolished to make way for newer bungalows.

== Transport ==
The 483 bus service ran by Rosso passes through the village on a regular basis giving easy access to Bury and Burnley. The 273 bus provides transport through to Burnley and Bolton.

== Sport ==
It was the home of semi-professional football club Rossendale United until they dissolved in 2011. Their home ground Dark Lane was set on fire in January 2012. The site is currently being redeveloped with 95 new family homes.

== Services ==
Newchurch has three churches, St Nicholas Church, St. Peter's RC and a Methodist church.

Most of the local village shops and the post office have closed in the last couple of decades due to increased transport making it easier to reach local supermarkets in nearby Rawtenstall. A takeaway, general store and hairdressers are the only remaining ones, as well as the last remaining local pub, the Boar's Head, which has been open since 1674. The other pub in the village, the Blue Bell, closed in 2013 and the empty building is currently for sale

Newchurch has two primary schools; St Nicholas and St Peter's as well as Staghills Children's Centre and Nursery, rated as "outstanding" by Ofsted.

== Notable people ==
- John Rushton (1798–1868) Archdeacon of Manchester from 1843 until 1854.
- Major Hugh Hay (1889–1965) a British WWI flying ace credited with five aerial victories.

== See also ==
- Listed buildings in Rawtenstall
