= Ilex Mill =

Cotton mill in Rossendale, Lancashire, England

Coordinates: 53.7006°N 2.2825°W

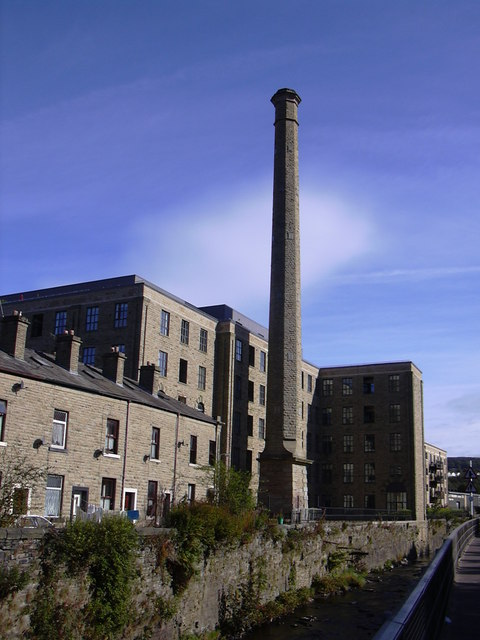
Ilex Mill in 2008

Ilex Mill is a cotton mill built in 1856 by the businessman Peter Whitehead in Rawtenstall, Rossendale, Lancashire, England. It reached its peak of production in 1895 when it had 50,000 spindles and 748 looms. However, by 1899 the building had been sold to Messrs Hoyle, Parker and Company who turned the premises into a shoe factory.

The building was once again used for textile production in the 1930s, and by 1954 two associated companies, James Rothwell and Fabricade Ltd occupied the building, working alongside one another. Fabricade made bedspreads and bathroom sets there until 1981, when they shut the plant down with the loss of 60 jobs. The building was put on the market for £85,000. The Council developed plans to turn the mill into a new Town Hall for the Borough of Rossendale which had been formed in 1974. The plans, which also involved the Rawtenstall Civic Society, the Lancashire Constabulary and the local Chamber of Commerce. They included Council administrative offices, a chamber for Council meetings and members facilities, as well as a police custody facilities, a community hall and tourist information office. The remaining space had yet to be allocated. The project received £4m from the Heritage Lottery Fund, English Heritage and English Partnerships. It was proposed that the renovation would be completed with minimum demolition and preservings as much as possible of the internal open space.

However these plans came to nothing, and after a brief period when the building was used to deliver training sessions, the building stood empty for 15 years. By 2003 the building was sold to PJ Livesey Living Space after two years of negotiation.
