= Peter Whitehead (businessman) =

English businessman (1793–1866)

Peter Whitehead (1793–1866) was a prominent businessman in Rawtenstall, Lancashire. With his brothers Thomas and David he established Thomas Whitehead and Brothers in 1815.

Following the dissolution of Thomas Whitehead and Brothers in 1855, Whitehead built the Ilex Mill, Rawtenstall in 1856.

He is buried in the same grave as his two brothers in the churchyard of Longholme Methodist Church.
