= Henry L. Shrewsbury =

Member of the South Carolina House of Representatives during the Reconstruction era

Henry L. Shrewsbury (born c. 1847) was an American teacher and Reconstruction era state legislator in South Carolina. He was described as a free mullato, and represented Chesterfield County in the South Carolina House of Representatives from 1868 until 1870.

Amelia Ann Shrewsbury was his sister. He taught at a school established by the American Missionary Association after the American Civil War.

He ran the Freedman Bureau office in Cheraw, South Carolina. He was a delegate to the 1868 South Carolina Constitutional Convention. He was appointed and election commissioner for Chesterfield County, South Carolina in October 1868.

The Chesterfield Democrat gave a favorable accounting of his integrity as a politician.
