= Thomas Whitehead (businessman) =

English businessman

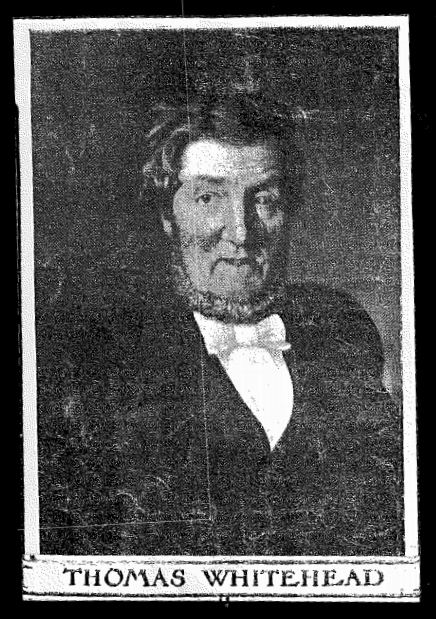
Thomas Whitehead

Thomas Whitehead (1787–1859) was a prominent business man in Rawtenstall, Lancashire. With David and Peter established Thomas Whitehead and Brothers in 1815.

Whitehead is buried in the same grave as his two brothers in the churchyard of Longholme Methodist Church.
