= David Whitehead (businessman) =

English businessman (1790-1865)

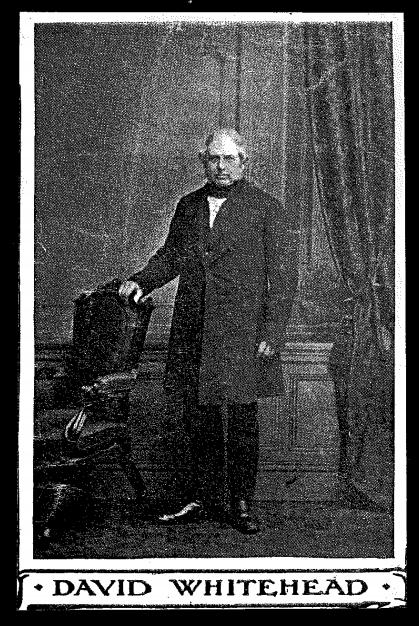
David Whitehead

David Whitehead (11 December, 1790, Gambleside - 28 January, 1865) was a Lancashire businessman who set up in business with his brothers Thomas and Peter in 1815. He became a major figure in the cotton industry, developing several mills in Rawtenstall. He was an active methodist and attended the third International Peace Congress held in Paris in 1849.

He is buried in the same grave as his two brothers in the churchyard of Longholme Methodist Church. He had 11 children, of whom nine appear to have survived him. His will divided his property between five sons with provision for his widow and four daughters. Two of his sons were Thomas Hoyle Whitehead and John Ormerod Whitehead.
