= St Nicholas Church, Newchurch =

St Nicholas Church
- Church of St Nicholas with St John
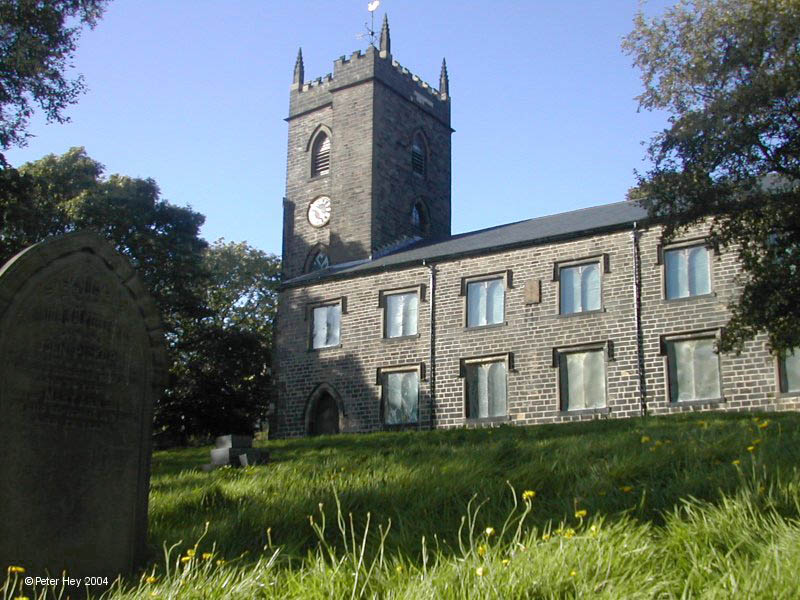

- Location in the Borough of Rossendale
- 53.697250°N 2.252521°W
- OS grid reference: SD 83428 22339
- Location: Newchurch, Lancashire
- Country: England
- Denomination: Church of England
- Website: stnicholasnewchurch.com

Architecture
- Completed: 1825

Specifications
- Materials: Dressed sandstone

Listed Building – Grade II*
- Official name: Church of St Nicholas with St John
- Designated: 7 June 1971
- Reference no.: 1072799

St Nicholas Church is in the village of Newchurch within the Rossendale borough of Lancashire, England. It is an active Anglican parish church in the Diocese of Manchester, founded in the early 16th century.

== History ==
The first church was thought to be made of wood and erected in 1511, and it was rebuilt in stone in 1561 in the reign of Queen Elizabeth I.

Known as the Chapel of Our Saviour or Holy Trinity, until being dedicated to St Nicholas when it was replaced by the current building, dated 1825 over the west door, which is believed to have been constructed by the parishioners themselves without the benefit of an architect. The chancel was added in 1897 by R. B Preston. It is a Grade II* listed building.

Today the parish is styled: St Nicholas, Newchurch with St John and St Michael. St. Michael's was built in Lumb in 1848 and St. John's was built at Cloughfold in 1890.
