= Rawtenstall =

Town in Lancashire, England

Coordinates: 53.699°N 2.291°W

- Town
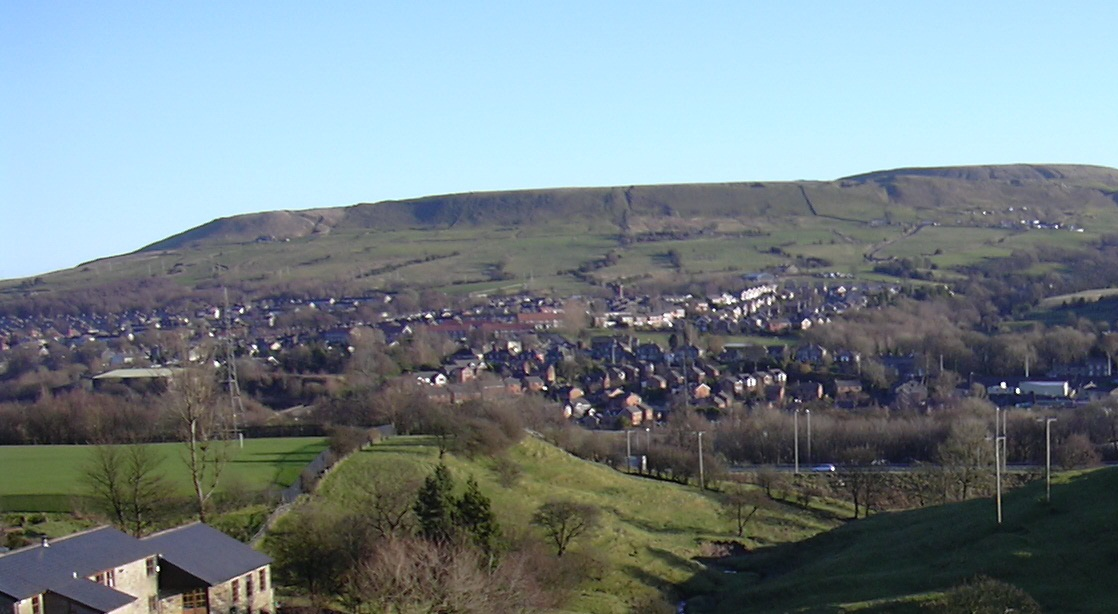
- Rawtenstall as seen from a hill in Haslingden, 2011

- Shown within Rossendale Location within Lancashire
- Population: 23,000
- OS grid reference: SD808226
  - London: 177 mi (285 km) SE
- District: Rossendale
- Shire county: Lancashire
- Region: North West
- Country: England
- Sovereign state: United Kingdom
- Post town: ROSSENDALE
- Postcode district: BB4
- Dialling code: 01706
- Police: Lancashire
- Fire: Lancashire
- Ambulance: North West
- UK Parliament: Rossendale and Darwen

Rawtenstall (/ˈrɒtənstɔːl/) is a town in the borough of Rossendale, Lancashire, England. The town lies 15 miles (24 km) north of Manchester, 22 miles (35 km) east of Preston and 45 miles (70 km) south east of Lancaster. The town is at the centre of the Rossendale Valley. As of 2022, it had a population of 23,000.

== Toponym ==
The name Rawtenstall has been given two possible interpretations. The older is a combination of the Middle English routen ('to roar or bellow'), from the Old Norse rauta and the Old English stall 'pool in a river' (Ekwall 1922, 92). The second, more recent one, relates to Rawtenstall's identification as a cattle farm in 1324 and combines the Old English ruh 'rough' and tun-stall 'the site of a farm or cow-pasture', or possibly, 'buildings occupied when cattle were pastured on high ground'

== History ==
The earliest settlement at Rawtenstall was probably in the early Middle Ages, during the time when it formed part of the Rossendale Valley in the Honour of Clitheroe, and consisted of simple dwellings for forest servants and animals. More substantial buildings may have followed in the 15th and 16th centuries with corn and flour mills.

The town entered a major period of growth during the Industrial Revolution, as new mills were constructed to process cotton. The climate and weather were conducive to the industry, as was the town's nearby location to the rapidly developing industrial and mercantile centre at Manchester, dubbed 'Cottonopolis'. Only a few of these mills survive today, and none are operational anymore. During this period, the brothers Thomas, David and Peter Whitehead became important entrepreneurs in the town. They built a number of mills, including one of the earliest mills in the valley, at Lower Mill, and the still existing Ilex Mill. They also built substantial houses for themselves at Holly Mount, as well as large numbers of terraced houses for their workers. Other industries active in this period included quarrying and small scale coal mining, as well as an expanding commercial sector.

As with many mid-Lancashire towns, it saw a population decline in the 20th century, going from 30,000 inhabitants in the 1911 census to 21,500 in the 1971 census. With the decline of the traditional manufacturing industries, shoemaking became one of the last survivors. this was usually known locally as the slipper industry, since slipper-making grew from the local processing of felt, which itself grew from the textile industry. The firm of H. W. Tricketts, in nearby Waterfoot, had been a major producer and exporter of footwear across the British Empire, but shoemaking declined rapidly from the 1980s. Firms closed as production moved overseas, and the remaining companies are largely importers.

The church of St Nicholas (Church of England) is at Newchurch (rebuilt 1825) as is the Roman Catholic church of St Peter (1892). Other churches are St Michael's Lumb, St James's Waterfoot, St Anne's Edgeside, St John's Cloughfold, St Mary's Oakenhead, St John the Evangelist's Crawshawbooth, St Mary and All Saints Goodshaw (rebuilt 1790). Another RC church (dedicated to St James the Less) is at Oakenhead and there are a number of Nonconformist chapels.

== Governance ==
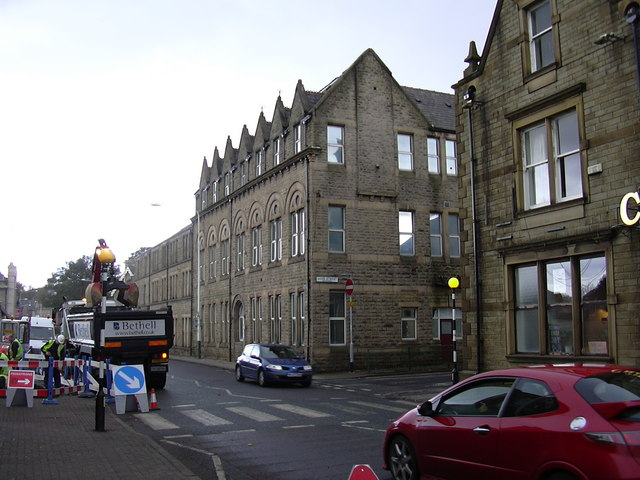
Rawtenstall Town Hall

The coat of arms of the former Rawtenstall Borough Council

A local board was formed for the town in 1874 and the district it governed was extended to cover parts of the townships of Lower Booths (Rawtenstall itself), Higher Booths, Newchurch and Haslingden in the ancient parish of Whalley and Cowpe, Lench, Newhall Hey and Hall Carr, and part of Tottington (Higher End) in the ancient parish of Bury. Rawtenstall Town Hall was completed in 1876. Subsequently, Rawtenstall was incorporated as a municipal borough in 1891 and in 1894 a civil parish was created to match the borders of the borough. Following the local government reorganisation in 1974 Rawtenstall became part of the Borough of Rossendale.

Rawtenstall is part of the Rossendale and Darwen constituency, after the constituency of Rossendale was abolished in 1983. The constituency sends one member of parliament to the House of Commons.

Andy MacNae MP has been the Member of Parliament for Rossendale and Darwen since the 2024 general election.

== Geography ==
The neighbouring towns in the valley are Bacup, Haslingden and Ramsbottom. The area is bounded to the north by Loveclough and Whitewell Bottom, to the east by Waterfoot and Cowpe and to the south by Townsend Fold and Horncliffe. The River Irwell passes through the town on the first part of its route between Bacup and Manchester, collecting Limy Water close to the junction of Bury Road with Bocholt Way. Over recent years the area has become increasingly popular with visitors, attracted by historic buildings, dramatic landscapes and the heritage railway, the East Lancashire Railway which offers tourists and visitors a chance for days out at Rawtenstall, Ramsbottom and Bury stations among many rural communities along the line.

== Climate ==
Like most of the United Kingdom, Rawtenstall has an oceanic climate.

Climate data for Rawtenstall
Month	Jan	Feb	Mar	Apr	May	Jun	Jul	Aug	Sep	Oct	Nov	Dec	Year
Mean daily maximum °C (°F)	3.9 (39.0)	3.9 (39.0)	6.1 (43.0)	9.2 (48.5)	12.8 (55.0)	15.1 (59.1)	17.5 (63.5)	16.8 (62.2)	14.4 (57.9)	11.0 (51.8)	6.7 (44.0)	5.4 (41.7)	11.2 (52.1)
Mean daily minimum °C (°F)	−1.1 (30.1)	−0.6 (30.9)	0.2 (32.4)	2.5 (36.5)	5.4 (41.7)	7.8 (46.1)	10.3 (50.5)	10.3 (50.5)	7.8 (46.1)	5.1 (41.2)	2.7 (36.8)	0.3 (32.5)	3.8 (38.9)
Average precipitation mm (inches)	170 (6.5)	116 (4.55)	134 (5.28)	91 (3.57)	85 (3.34)	97 (3.81)	95 (3.74)	123 (4.83)	130 (5.11)	150 (6)	156 (6.15)	180 (6.9)	3,037 (119.56)

== Transport ==
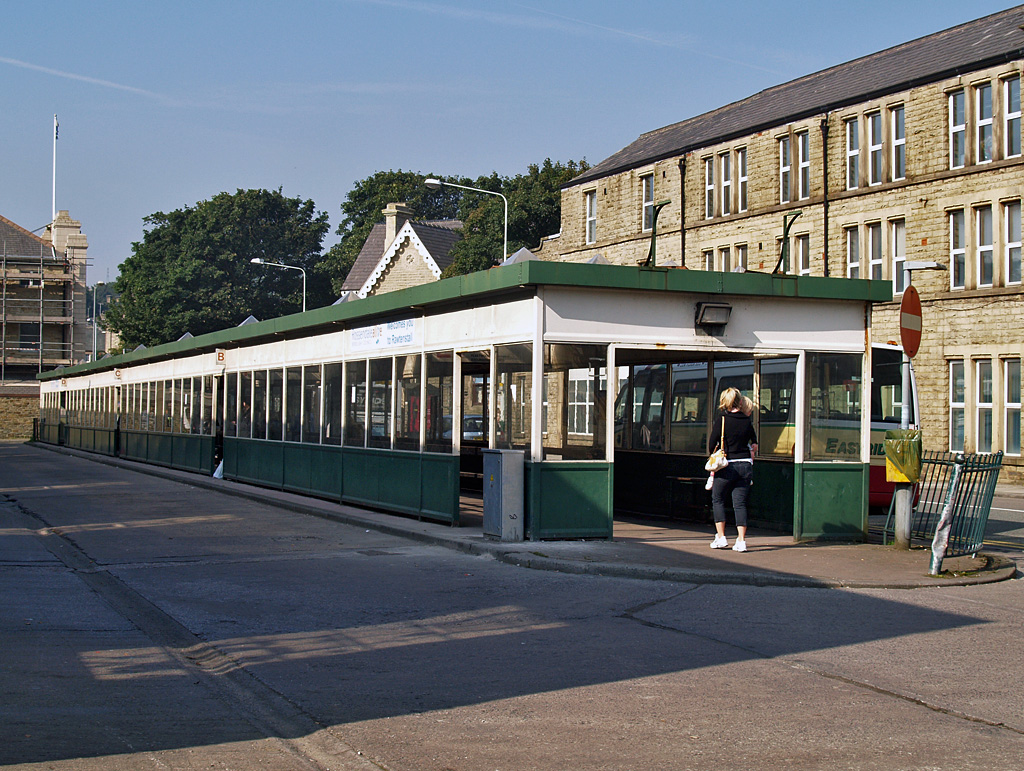
Rawtenstall's old bus station, September 2008

The town has had bus routes since the early 1930s. The town is served locally by Transdev and Burnley Bus Company. In 2007 a proposal to demolish part of the previous bus station and build a Lidl store on the site was agreed and the new store was finally completed in 2009. Lancashire County Council and Rossendale Borough Council then eventually replaced the old bus station with a modern bus interchange, which commenced service on Sunday 24 November 2019.

Rawtenstall railway station also serves the town, but since the closure of the main line to Manchester, it now operates mainly as a tourist route, as part of the East Lancashire Railway, of which Rawtenstall station forms the northern terminus. The M66 motorway from Manchester is linked to Rawtenstall via the A56 Edenfield bypass, allowing for a driving time between Manchester and Rawtenstall of around half an hour. Today, Rawtenstall's nearest rail station is in the town of Accrington and over the county border in West Yorkshire in the town of Todmorden in Calderdale. The nearest metro link is in Bury.

== Education ==
The town has a number of primary and secondary (high) schools, including Alder Grange School, Bellmont School, St Paul's C of E Primary, Cloughfold Primary School, Leabrook School and All Saints' Catholic High School. Though located in Waterfoot, rather than Rawtenstall, the traditional grammar school, Bacup and Rawtenstall Grammar School takes part of its name from the town.

Rawtenstall also has a public library, built in 1906 with Carnegie funding.

== The town centre ==
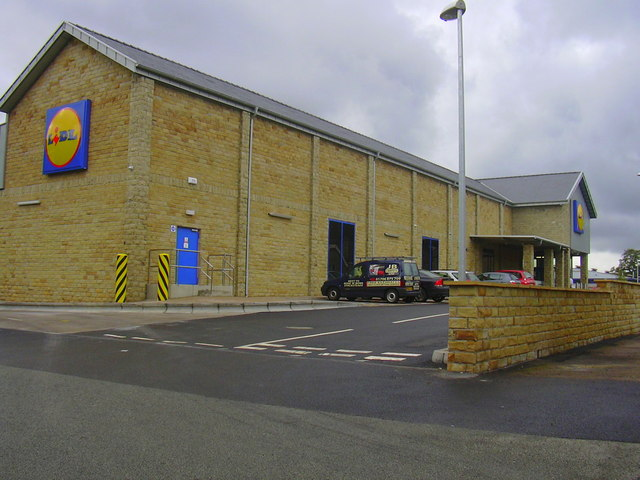
Rawtenstall's Lidl store

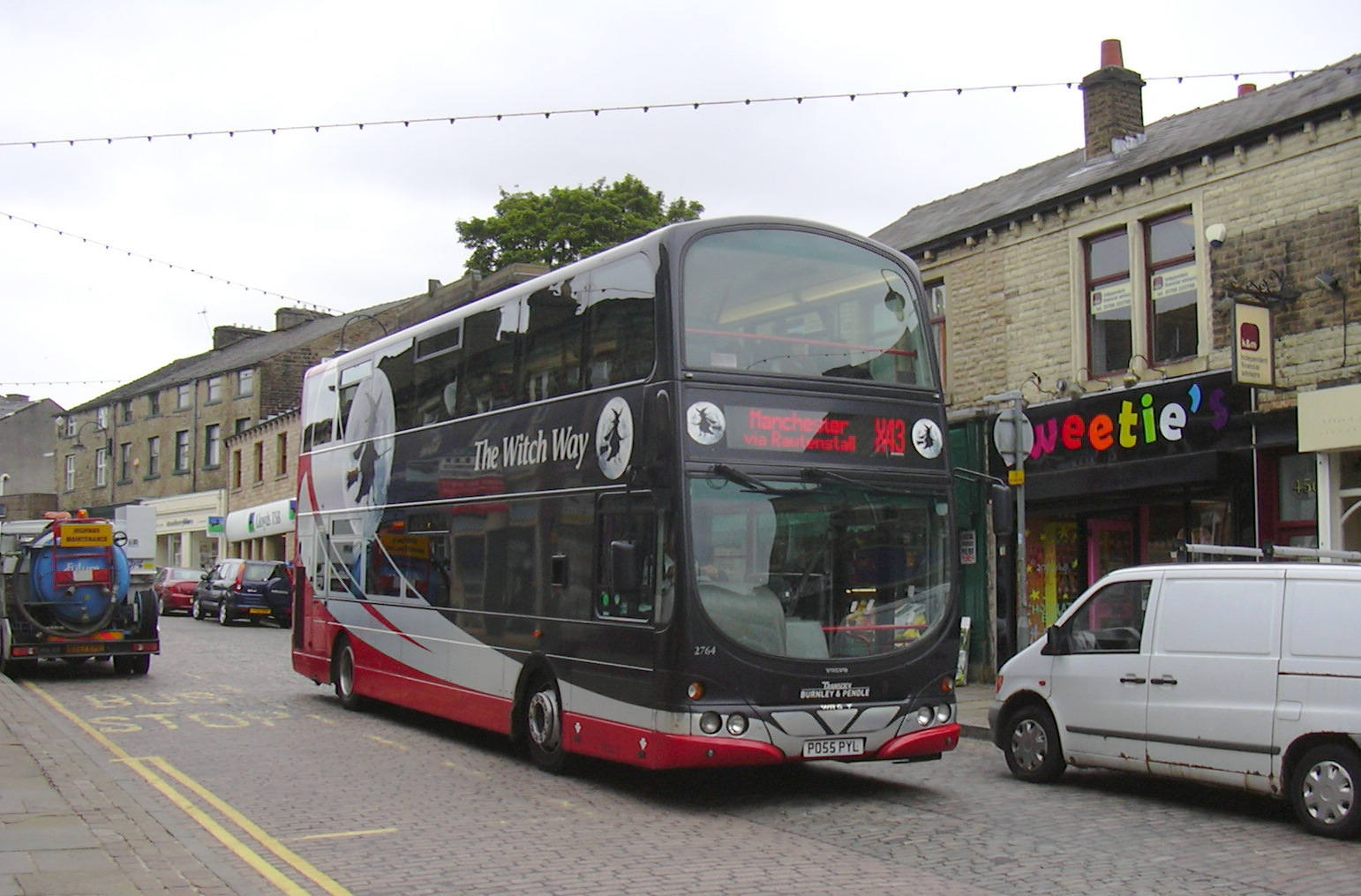
The Witch Way on Bank Street (X43)

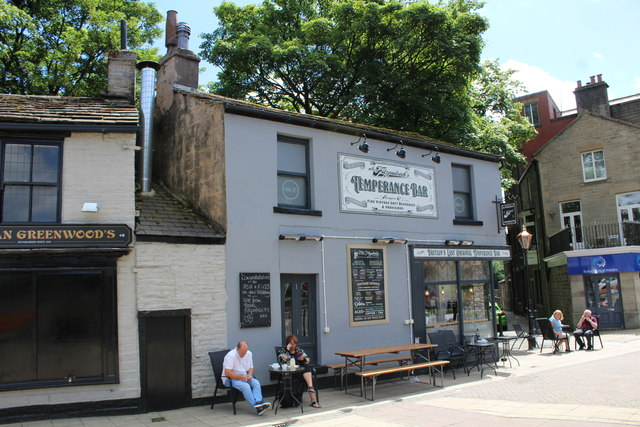
Mr Fitzpatrick's, "the last temperance bar in England"

By 2000, Rawtenstall's 1960s shopping centre had become deserted and boarded-up, and after 2003 various proposals were put forward regarding reconstruction or refurbishment. An agreement between Rossendale Council and the owners of the Rawtenstall centre, Ashcap, in February 2011, was said to "improve Rawtenstall town centre". In late 2011 the shopping centre was demolished, creating a new town square area, where local markets and other events are infrequently held. Rossendale Council funded the demolition using money set aside for a public pool in neighbouring town Haslingden. This move was controversial locally, but the completed bus station has also attracted positive comment. Since 2017 several new bars, shops, bistros and venues have opened in the centre of the town, along with a rejuvenated market under new management.

Close by to the Cricket Ground is the Weavers Cottage. This is a characterful 18th century loom shop, which has been restored as a small museum containing a Victorian kitchen, a clog shop and a working hand loom.

The Rossendale Valley's local newspaper, the Rossendale Free Press was originally based in Rawtenstall, before being bought out by the Manchester Evening News in 2009 and subsequently moving to Manchester. Rawtenstall also has one of the largest indoor markets in Rossendale (a sign declaring it to be "probably the friendliest market in the world"), which suffered a serious arson attack in March 2011.

The town is also home to the traditional herbalist and temperance bar Mr Fitzpatrick's, which claims to be the oldest brewer of sarsaparilla and dandelion and burdock in the country. Mr Fitzpatrick's gained television acclaim in April 2005 when it won the Famous Sarsaparilla Taste-off on ITV. It is the last bar of its kind in England.

The acclaimed fashion boutique Sunday Best was opened in 1971 by Jan Shutt and is situated on Bank Street. Sunday Best won The Daily Telegraph magazine's best shop in Britain award for women's fashion in 2011 whilst Roland's Florist on Bacup Road was runner up in the best florist category. The awards were judged by TV shopping guru Mary Portas.

Police facilities in Rawtenstall were one of five sites used for the training of new recruits to the Lancashire Constabulary. In late 2011, due to funding cuts, Rawtenstall Police Station, along with various other stations in the area, closed down. Rawtenstall is also the location of the area's county and magistrates' courts.

== Culture ==
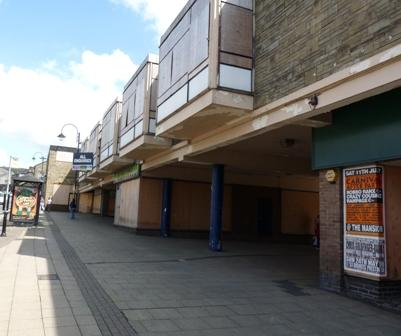
The now demolished Valley Centre in Rawtenstall

Rawtenstall was featured in the documentary series Who Do You Think You Are? which was aired on BBC2 at 9.00pm on 2 February 2006. The subject, actress Jane Horrocks, was born in Rawtenstall in 1964.

The Irwell Sculpture Trail passes through the town, where four of the sculptures are located; the Whispering Wall, the Gateway, the Willow Tree and the Bocholt Tree. The last, by sculptor Bernard Tindall, celebrates Rossendale's twinning links with the town of Bocholt, Germany. The Shoe Trail also passes the outskirts of the town, and goes through nearby places such as Whitaker Park.

== Whitaker Park and The Whitaker ==
Whitaker Park is located on the outskirts of the town centre, between Haslingden Road (A681) and Haslingden Old Road. It consists of the former house of the mill owner George Hardman, built in the 1840s, and originally standing in 28 acres of parkland. It is still set in extensive landscaped grounds. Donated to the township of Rawtenstall in 1902 by Richard Whitaker, who brought the house from Hardman for the purposes of civic recreation, the property is now known as The Whitaker, previously Rossendale Museum and Art Gallery. The gardens and surrounding land are laid out as a public park. The park itself has tennis courts, a bowling green, basketball court, an Incredible Edible area, a skateboard area and a playground as well as formal gardens and fountains.

The recently refurbished museum contains exhibits of local history, gallery spaces, and a cabinet of curiosities room. There is an extensive exhibition of taxidermy, and gallery areas for displaying contemporary art and other exhinbitions. Arthur Mee considered it 'one of the best small museums in the North', saying "...perhaps the most fascinating things in the museum are the Domestic Bygones, with hourglasses, toys and spinning wheels, snuff boxes and tinder boxes, the sand dredgers used before blotting-paper was known, rushlights and moulds for making candles, a grand collection of the homely things our forefathers (sic) used". In 2019 The Whitaker was awarded a National Lottery Heritage Fund award of £1.7 million to convert the museum and the former barn and stables. This has doubled its size and enabled the museum to develop its displays and education work, its cafe/restaurant and bar, as well as the study spaces and a shop. It reopened at the end of July 2021, and now includes the old Rossendale Council Parks Department yard at the rear which has been converted to a multi-purpose public area.

== Media ==
Local news and television programmes are provided by BBC North West and ITV Granada. Television signals are received from the Winter Hill TV transmitter and one of the two local relay transmitters (Haslingden and Bacup).

Local radio stations are BBC Radio Lancashire on 95.5 FM, Heart North West on 105.4 FM, Capital Manchester and Lancashire on 107.0 FM, Greatest Hits Radio Lancashire on 96.5 FM, and Rossendale Radio, a community based radio station which broadcast to the town on 104.7 FM

The town's local newspaper is the Lancashire Telegraph.

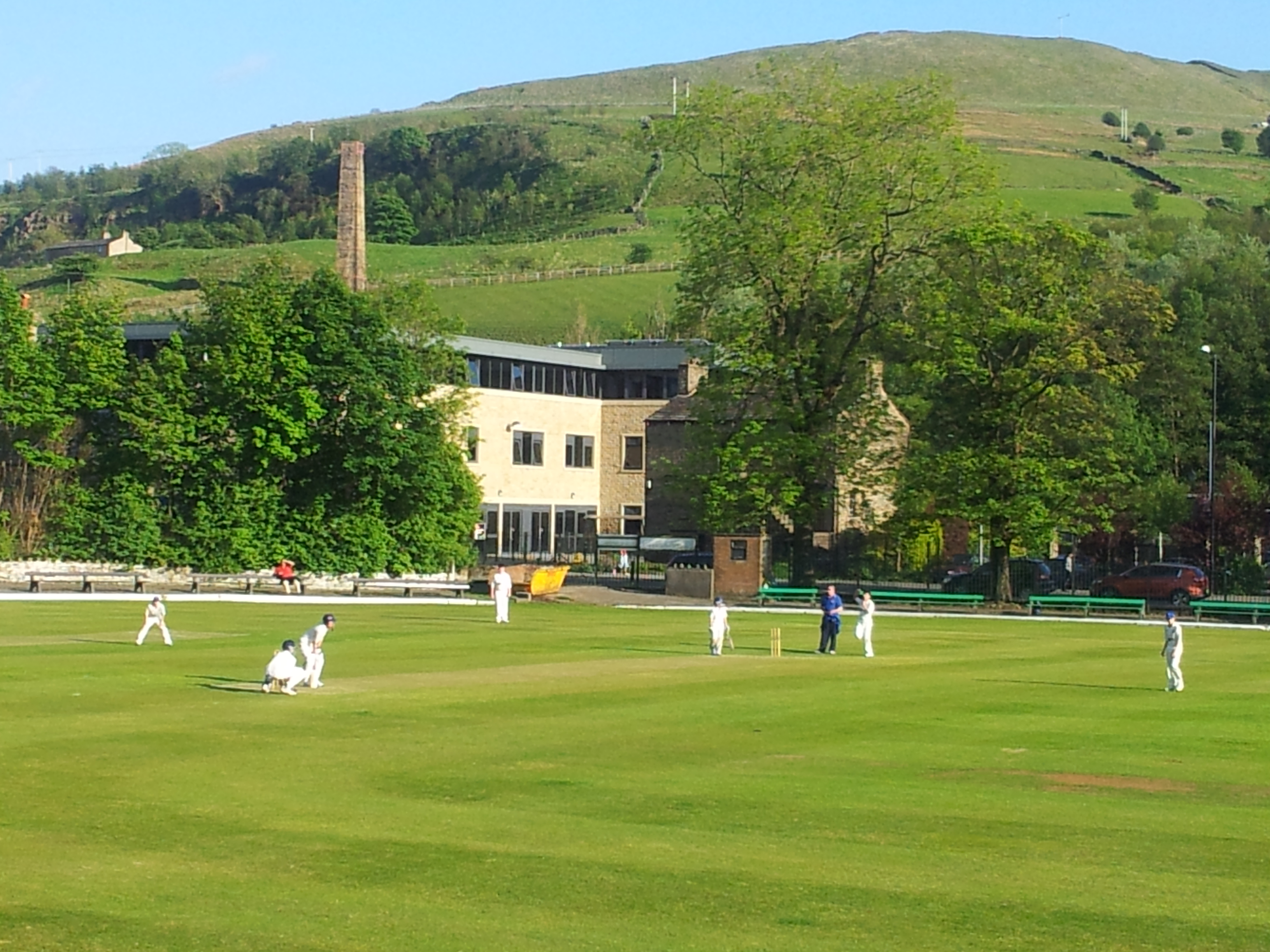
Cricket at Rawtenstall Cricket Club's Bacup Road ground

== Sport ==
Rawtenstall is home to the North of England's largest dry ski-slope. Ski Rossendale is located five minutes from Rawtenstall town centre in the Oakenhead area, directly above Whitaker Park and Rossendale Museum. Over its 40-year existence it had seen world record attempts and was used by Olympic athletes and novice skiers. It re-opened after a period of closure in November 2011 with new funding, with a large ceremonial fireworks display on its opening day, Bonfire Night.

Rawtenstall Cricket Club, who compete in the Lancashire League, have their home ground, Worswick Memorial Ground, within the town. Rawtenstall is also home to Rossendale RUFC, who compete in the National League 2 North.

== Notable people ==
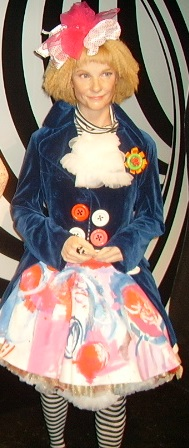
Waxwork of Jane Horrocks at Madame Tussauds in Blackpool

- David Whitehead (1790–1865), Lancashire businessman, with his brothers Thomas (1787–1859) and Peter (1793–1866), they developed several mills in Rawtenstall.
- Peter Haddon (1898–1962), an English actor.
- Ernest Tomlinson (1924–2015), composer, noted for his light music
- Brian S. Hartley (1926–2021), a British biochemist and academic
- Fred Tomlinson (1927–2016), singer, songwriter and composer
- Elizabeth Bainbridge (born 1930), retired opera singer
- John Egan (born 1939), industrialist, past president of the Confederation of British Industry
- Jane Horrocks (born 1964), actress, voice artist, musician and singer, Absolutely Fabulous
- Natalie Casey (born 1980), actress, starred in Two Pints of Lager and a Packet of Crisps
- Phil Lester (born 1987), YouTuber and BBC Radio 1 presenter.

=== Sport ===
- Winston Place (1914−2002), cricketer, opening batsman for Lancashire
- Colin Blant (born 1946), a retired footballer with over 260 club caps
- Mark Brennan (born 1965), a former footballer with 462 club caps, starting with Ipswich Town
- Lee Cartwright (born 1972), footballer who played 527 games including 403 for Preston North End
- Thomas Hamer (born 1998), parasport swimmer, two silver medals at the 2016 Summer Paralympics

== See also ==
- Listed buildings in Rawtenstall
- Rawtenstall Corporation Tramways
