= Rossendale Borough Council elections =

Local government elections in England

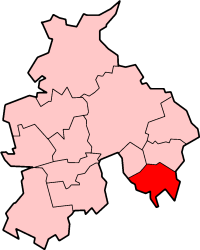
Rossendale shown within the non-metropolitan county of Lancashire (Unitary authorities excluded)

Rossendale Borough Council elections are generally held three years out of every four, with a third of the council elected each time. Rossendale Borough Council is the local authority for the non-metropolitan district of Rossendale in Lancashire, England. Since the last boundary changes in 2002, 36 councillors have been elected from 14 wards. At the 2024 election, new ward boundaries will be in effect and the number of councillors will decrease to 30.

== Council elections ==
- 1973 Rossendale Borough Council election
- 1976 Rossendale Borough Council election (New ward boundaries)
- 1979 Rossendale Borough Council election
- 1980 Rossendale Borough Council election
- 1982 Rossendale Borough Council election
- 1983 Rossendale Borough Council election
- 1984 Rossendale Borough Council election
- 1986 Rossendale Borough Council election
- 1987 Rossendale Borough Council election
- 1988 Rossendale Borough Council election
- 1990 Rossendale Borough Council election
- 1991 Rossendale Borough Council election
- 1992 Rossendale Borough Council election
- 1994 Rossendale Borough Council election (Borough boundary changes took place but the number of seats remained the same)
- 1995 Rossendale Borough Council election
- 1996 Rossendale Borough Council election
- 1998 Rossendale Borough Council election
- 1999 Rossendale Borough Council election
- 2000 Rossendale Borough Council election
- 2002 Rossendale Borough Council election (New ward boundaries)
- 2003 Rossendale Borough Council election
- 2004 Rossendale Borough Council election
- 2006 Rossendale Borough Council election
- 2007 Rossendale Borough Council election
- 2008 Rossendale Borough Council election
- 2010 Rossendale Borough Council election
- 2011 Rossendale Borough Council election
- 2012 Rossendale Borough Council election
- 2014 Rossendale Borough Council election
- 2015 Rossendale Borough Council election
- 2016 Rossendale Borough Council election
- 2018 Rossendale Borough Council election
- 2019 Rossendale Borough Council election
- 2021 Rossendale Borough Council election
- 2022 Rossendale Borough Council election
- 2023 Rossendale Borough Council election
- 2024 Rossendale Borough Council election (new ward boundaries - seats decreased to 30)

== Borough result maps ==
2002 results map

2003 results map

2004 results map

2006 results map

2007 results map

2008 results map

2010 results map

2011 results map

2012 results map

2014 results map

2015 results map

2016 results map

2018 results map

2019 results map

2021 results map

2022 results map

2023 results map

2024 results map

== By-election results ==
=== 2002-2006 ===
Stacksteads By-Election 14 August 2003
Party	Candidate	Votes	%	±%
Labour		411	47.1	
Liberal Democrats		312	35.8	
Conservative		149	17.1	
Majority		99	11.3	
Turnout		872	30.7	
Labour hold		Swing		

Long Holme By-Election 30 September 2004
Party	Candidate	Votes	%	±%
Conservative		720	58.5	+3.2
Labour		511	41.5	−3.2
Majority		209	17.0	
Turnout		1,231	30.0	
Conservative hold		Swing		

Greenfield By-Election 5 May 2005
Party	Candidate	Votes	%	±%
Liberal Democrats	Catherine Pilling	1,419	56.0	+18.6
Conservative	Granville Morris	1,112	44.0	+2.9
Majority		307	12.0	
Turnout		2,531	61.2	
Liberal Democrats gain from Conservative		Swing		

Hareholme By-Election 20 October 2005
Party	Candidate	Votes	%	±%
Labour	Ruth Alcroft	585	44.8	+0.9
Conservative	Mark Mills	477	36.5	−19.6
Liberal Democrats	Michael Carr	244	18.7	+18.7
Majority		108	8.3	
Turnout		1,306	30.8	
Labour gain from Conservative		Swing		

=== 2006-2010 ===
Cribden By-Election 30 September 2006
Party	Candidate	Votes	%	±%
Labour	Christine Gill	391	40.0	−6.2
Liberal Democrats	Robert Sheffield	312	31.9	+31.9
Conservative	Helen Marsden	186	19.0	−34.8
BNP	Kevin Bryan	89	9.1	+9.1
Majority		79	8.1	
Turnout		978	34.2	
Labour gain from Liberal Democrats		Swing		

Goodshaw By-Election 13 September 2007
Party	Candidate	Votes	%	±%
Labour	Dorothy Farrington	634	59.5	+6.5
Conservative	Judith Bates	300	28.1	−18.9
BNP	Michael Crossley	80	7.5	+7.5
Liberal Democrats	Benjamin Dixon	52	4.9	+4.9
Majority		334	31.4	
Turnout		1,066	33.8	
Labour gain from Conservative		Swing		

Irwell By-Election 13 September 2007
Party	Candidate	Votes	%	±%
Labour	Tina Durkin	379	37.2	+5.2
Conservative	Hazel Steen	312	30.6	−1.6
BNP	Kevin Bryan	281	27.5	+1.2
Liberal Democrats	James Pilling	48	4.7	−4.9
Majority		67	6.6	
Turnout		1,020	27.0	
Labour gain from Conservative		Swing		

Whitewell By-Election 13 September 2007
Party	Candidate	Votes	%	±%
Liberal Democrats	William Nuttall	606	48.6	+11.9
Labour	Patricia Dearden	399	32.0	−5.7
Conservative	Peter Starkey	152	12.2	−13.5
BNP	Peter Salt	91	7.3	+7.3
Majority		207	16.6	
Turnout		1,248	28.8	
Liberal Democrats gain from Conservative		Swing		

Hareholme By-Election 22 November 2007
Party	Candidate	Votes	%	±%
Labour	Colin Crawforth	591	53.2	+7.1
Conservative	Jason Gledhill	520	46.8	+6.3
Majority		71	6.4	
Turnout		1,111	26.2	
Conservative hold		Swing		

Helmshore By-Election 4 June 2009
Party	Candidate	Votes	%	±%
Conservative	Amanda Milling	1,015	53.6	−6.6
Liberal Democrats	Simon Holland	490	25.9	+14.7
Labour	Ann Kenyon	389	20.5	+0.8
Majority		525	27.7	
Turnout		1,894	42.0	
Conservative hold		Swing		

=== 2010-2014 ===
Healey and Whitworth By-Election 7 October 2010
Party	Candidate	Votes	%	±%
Labour	Sean Joseph Michael Serridge	346	51.1	+18.3
Community First Party	David Bradbury	165	24.4	−9.5
Conservative	Marie Gibbons	156	23.0	+0.8
Liberal Democrats	Clive Laight	10	1.5	−9.7
Majority		181	26.7	
Turnout		677	21.7	
Labour hold		Swing		

Irwell By-Election 7 October 2010
Party	Candidate	Votes	%	±%
Labour	Helen Jackson	277	37.2	+0.5
Conservative	Elizabeth Anne Heath	220	29.6	−13.5
Liberal Democrats	Bill Jackson	183	24.6	+24.6
Community First Party	Tina Durkin	64	8.6	+8.6
Majority		57	7.7	
Turnout		744	17.7	
Labour gain from Conservative		Swing		

=== 2014-2018 ===
Helmshore By-Election 16 October 2014
Party	Candidate	Votes	%	±%
Conservative	Tony Haworth	771	48.8	−13.4
Labour	Emma Harding	444	28.1	−9.7
UKIP	Granville Barker	364	23.1	+23.1
Majority		327	20.7	
Turnout		1,579		
Conservative hold		Swing		

Longholme By-Election 4 December 2014
Party	Candidate	Votes	%	±%
Labour	Annie McMahon	505	43.8	+0.9
Conservative	Mischa Charlton-Mockett	390	33.8	+0.5
UKIP	Gary Barnes	258	22.4	−1.4
Majority		115	10.0	
Turnout		1,153		
Labour hold		Swing		

=== 2022-2026 ===
Facit and Shawforth By-Election 29 September 2022
Party	Candidate	Votes	%	±%
Conservative	Scott Smith	337	43.5	+12.4
Independent	Kim Olaolu	214	27.6	+27.6
Labour	Caitlin Chippendale	203	26.2	+0.4
Green	Alex Vijatov	20	2.6	+2.6
Majority		123	20.7	
Turnout		774		
Conservative hold		Swing		

Helmshore By-Election 29 September 2022
Party	Candidate	Votes	%	±%
Conservative	Ann Hodgkiss	736	50.6	+4.0
Labour	Neil Looker	504	37.1	+0.5
Green	Katrina Brockbank	74	5.1	−6.3
Liberal Democrats	Steve Nelson	62	4.3	+4.3
Independent	David Stansfield	42	2.9	−2.4
Majority		196	13.5	
Turnout		1,454		
Conservative hold		Swing		

Whitworth By-Election 26 June 2025
Party	Candidate	Votes	%	±%
Reform UK	Mackenzie Ritson	733	47.5	
Conservative	Matthew Carr	449	29.1	
Labour	Caitlin Chippendale	251	16.3	
Green	Vivienne Hall	110	7.1	
Majority		284	18.4	
Turnout		1,543		
Reform UK gain from Community First		Swing		

Hareholme & Waterfoot By-Election 2 April 2026
Party	Candidate	Votes	%	±%
Green	Laura Diamond	636	37.7	
Reform UK	Clive Balchin	582	34.5	
Labour	Cathy Tinston	324	19.2	
Conservative	Matthew Littler	115	6.8	
Liberal Democrats	Keith Bardsley	31	1.8	
Majority		54	3.2	
Turnout		1,688		
Green gain from Labour		Swing		
