= 2024 Rossendale Borough Council election =

Local election in Rossendale, England

- 2 May 2024

All 30 seats to Rossendale Borough Council 16 seats needed for a majority

	First party	Second party	Third party
Leader	Alyson Barnes	David Foxcroft
Party	Labour	Conservative	Green
Last election	22 seats, 44.6%	9 seats, 34.1%	1 seat, 14.4%
Seats before	22	9	1
Seats won	20	5	3
Seat change	▼2	▼4	▲2
Popular vote	18,794	12,915	10,041
Percentage	42.8%	29.4%	22.9%
Swing	▼1.7%	▼4.7%	▲8.5%
	Fourth party	Fifth party
Party	Community First	Independent
Last election	2 seats, 5.4%	2 seats, 1.2%
Seats before	2	2
Seats won	2	0
Seat change	Steady	▼2
Popular vote	1,527	585
Percentage	3.5%	1.3%
Swing	▼1.9%	▲0.1%
- Results by ward
Leader before election
Alyson Barnes
Labour
Leader after election
Alyson Barnes
Labour

The 2024 Rossendale Borough Council election was held on Thursday 2 May 2024, alongside the other local elections being held in the United Kingdom on the same day. It will elect all 30 seats to the council.

== Background ==
This election marked a change in the electoral pattern for the Council. Prior to this election a third of the council was elected at a time three years out of every four. From this election onwards the whole council would be elected together every four years. Due to a boundary review of the wards by the Local Government Boundary Commission for England, the number of seats has been decreased to 30 seats from 36.

At the previous election, held in 2023, the Labour Party increased their majority by 3 seats, leading to them having 22 seats and keeping the council under Labour control. The Green Party also gained representation on the council for the first time.

Pre-Election Composition
Graph of the party split among 36 seats.
Party	Seats
Labour	21
Conservative	9
Community First	2
Independent	2
Green	1
Vacant	1

== Summary ==
=== Election result ===
2024 Rossendale Borough Council election
Party	Candidates	Seats	Gains	Losses	Net gain/loss	Seats %	Votes %	Votes	+/−
Labour	26	20	1	0	▼2	66.7	42.8	18,794	–1.7
Conservative	25	5	0	1	▼4	16.7	29.4	12,915	–4.7
Green	30	3	0	0	▲2	10.0	22.9	10,041	+8.5
Community First	2	2	0	0	Steady	6.7	3.5	1,527	–1.9
Independent	1	0	0	0	▼2	0.0	1.3	585	+0.1

== Ward results ==
The Statement of Persons Nominated, which details the candidates standing in each ward, was released by Rossendale Borough Council following the close of nominations on 8 April 2024. Sitting councillors standing for re-election are marked with an asterisk (*).

=== Bacup ===
Bacup (3 seats)
Party	Candidate	Votes	%	±%
Labour	Judith Driver*	767	57.9	
Labour	Jimmy Eaton	744	56.2	
Labour	David Hancock	661	49.9	
Conservative	Deborah Lord	373	28.2	
Conservative	Jayde Holmes	305	23.0	
Green	Helen Bauld	210	15.9	
Green	Daniel Brogan	151	11.4	
Green	Dympna Bull	135	10.2	
Turnout		1,334	28.49	
Registered electors		4,682		
Labour win (new seat)				
Labour win (new seat)				
Labour win (new seat)				

=== Britannia & Lee Mill ===
Britannia & Lee Mill (3 seats)
Party	Candidate	Votes	%	±%
Labour	Andrew Walmsley*	667	53.7	
Labour	Danielle Ashworth*	619	49.8	
Labour	Michelle Smith*	595	47.9	
Conservative	Robert Wells	447	36.0	
Conservative	Jenny Rigby*	401	32.3	
Green	Joanne Jackson	211	17.0	
Green	James Delargy	124	10.0	
Green	Alex Vijatov	119	9.6	
Turnout		1,248	27.69	
Registered electors		4,507		
Labour win (new seat)				
Labour win (new seat)				
Labour win (new seat)				

=== Goodshaw & Cribden ===
Goodshaw & Cribden (3 seats)
Party	Candidate	Votes	%	±%
Labour	Alyson Barnes*	1,014	51.5	
Labour	Christine Gill*	847	43.0	
Labour	Greg Bleakley	804	40.9	
Conservative	John Greenwood	764	38.8	
Conservative	Jonathan Foxcroft	672	34.1	
Conservative	Tony Cope	615	31.3	
Green	Ingrid Falat	279	14.2	
Green	Maureen Anderson	270	13.7	
Green	David Goodwin	213	10.8	
Turnout		1,981	38.65	
Registered electors		5,126		
Labour win (new seat)				
Labour win (new seat)				
Labour win (new seat)				

=== Greenfield & Eden ===
Greenfield & Eden (3 seats)
Party	Candidate	Votes	%	±%
Conservative	Anne Cheetham*	843	44.6	
Labour Co-op	Neil Looker*	773	40.9	
Conservative	Simon Holland	761	40.3	
Labour Co-op	Nick Pilling	722	38.2	
Conservative	Christian Lee	678	35.9	
Green	Jacob Rorke	502	26.6	
Green	Sharon Green	431	22.8	
Green	Gillian Hewitt	332	17.6	
Turnout		1,903	36.31	
Registered electors		5,241		
Conservative win (new seat)				
Labour win (new seat)				
Conservative win (new seat)				

=== Hareholme & Waterfoot ===
Hareholme & Waterfoot (3 seats)
Party	Candidate	Votes	%	±%
Labour	Nick Harris	831	46.8	
Labour	Annie McMahon*	793	44.7	
Labour	Tom Belli	765	43.1	
Green	Sara Bird	503	28.3	
Green	Chris Adams	437	24.6	
Conservative	Matthew Littler	430	24.2	
Green	Elliot Green	421	23.7	
Conservative	Barbara Marriott	400	22.5	
Conservative	Kenneth Slaughter	379	21.4	
Turnout		1,783	32.85	
Registered electors		5,427		
Labour win (new seat)				
Labour win (new seat)				
Labour win (new seat)				

=== Haslingden ===
Haslingden (3 seats)
Party	Candidate	Votes	%	±%
Labour	Adrian Lythgoe*	644	45.6	
Labour	Ann Kenyon*	632	44.8	
Labour	Marilyn Procter*	630	44.6	
Green	Katrina Brockbank	414	29.3	
Conservative	Toby Cheetham	356	25.2	
Conservative	Ken Booth	335	23.7	
Green	Hazel Armor	331	23.5	
Green	Kamran Shah	309	21.9	
Turnout		1,421	26.02	
Registered electors		5,462		
Labour win (new seat)				
Labour win (new seat)				
Labour win (new seat)				

=== Helmshore ===
Helmshore (3 seats)
Party	Candidate	Votes	%	±%
Conservative	Ann Hodgkiss*	1,003	47.5	
Labour	Samara Barnes*	986	46.7	
Conservative	Alan Woods*	965	45.7	
Conservative	Caroline Snowden*	883	41.8	
Labour	Ann McIntyre	880	41.7	
Green	Jean Duckworth	318	15.1	
Green	Geoff Blow	259	12.3	
Green	Chich Hewitt	146	6.9	
Turnout		2,120	42.48	
Registered electors		4,991		
Conservative hold				
Labour gain from Conservative				
Conservative hold				

=== Longholme ===
Longholme (3 seats)
Party	Candidate	Votes	%	±%
Labour	Samantha Harris	847	53.3	
Labour	Liz McInnes*	844	53.1	
Labour	Matt Norton*	718	45.2	
Conservative	Elaine Brignall	416	26.2	
Conservative	Margaret Pendlebury	399	25.1	
Green	Terry Bird	328	20.6	
Green	Rosie Jones	321	20.2	
Conservative	Mohammed Abdullah	304	19.1	
Green	Harold Duckworth	208	13.1	
Turnout		1,601	31.39	
Registered electors		5,101		
Labour hold				
Labour hold				
Labour hold				

=== Whitewell & Stacksteads ===
Whitewell & Stacksteads (3 seats)
Party	Candidate	Votes	%	±%
Green	Julie Adshead*	985	60.4	
Green	Bob Bauld	819	50.2	
Green	John Payne	764	46.8	
Labour	Jackie Oakes*	674	41.3	
Labour	Gill Windwood	432	26.5	
Labour	Marie Rolli	424	26.0	
Conservative	David Watson	188	11.5	
Conservative	Jan Brindley	166	10.2	
Conservative	John Lowe	153	9.4	
Turnout		1,640	32.67	
Registered electors		5,020		
Green win (new seat)				
Green win (new seat)				
Green win (new seat)				

=== Whitworth ===
Whitworth (3 seats)
Party	Candidate	Votes	%	±%
Community First	Alan Neal*	866	52.0	
Conservative	Scott Smith*	679	40.8	
Community First	Mike Royds	661	39.7	
Independent	Janet Whitehead*	585	35.1	
Labour	Caitlin Chippendale	481	28.9	
Green	Vivienne Hall	254	15.3	
Green	Andrew Ovens	168	10.1	
Green	Paul Shellard	79	4.7	
Turnout		1,669	28.94	
Registered electors		5,768		
Community First win (new seat)				
Conservative win (new seat)				
Community First win (new seat)				

== By-elections ==
=== Whitworth ===
Councillor Michael Royds resigned.

Whitworth by-election: 26 June 2025
Party	Candidate	Votes	%	±%
Reform	Mackenzie Ritson	733	47.5	N/A
Local Conservatives	Matthew Carr	449	29.1	–0.7
Labour	Caitlin Chippendale	251	16.3	–4.8
Green	Vivienne Hall	110	7.1	–4.0
Majority		284	18.4	N/A
Turnout		1,548	26.2	–2.7
Registered electors		5,906		
Reform gain from Community First				

=== Hareholme & Waterfoot ===
Councillor Tom Belli resigned.

Hareholme & Waterfoot By-Election 2 April 2026
Party	Candidate	Votes	%	±%
Green	Laura Diamond	636	37.7	
Reform	Clive Balchin	582	34.5	
Labour	Cathy Tinston	324	19.2	
Conservative	Matthew Littler	115	6.8	
Liberal Democrats	Keith Bardsley	31	1.8	
Majority		54	3.2	
Turnout		1,692	30.7	
Registered electors		5,507		
Green gain from Labour		Swing		
