= Andy MacNae =

British politician (born 1965)

Andy MacNae MP
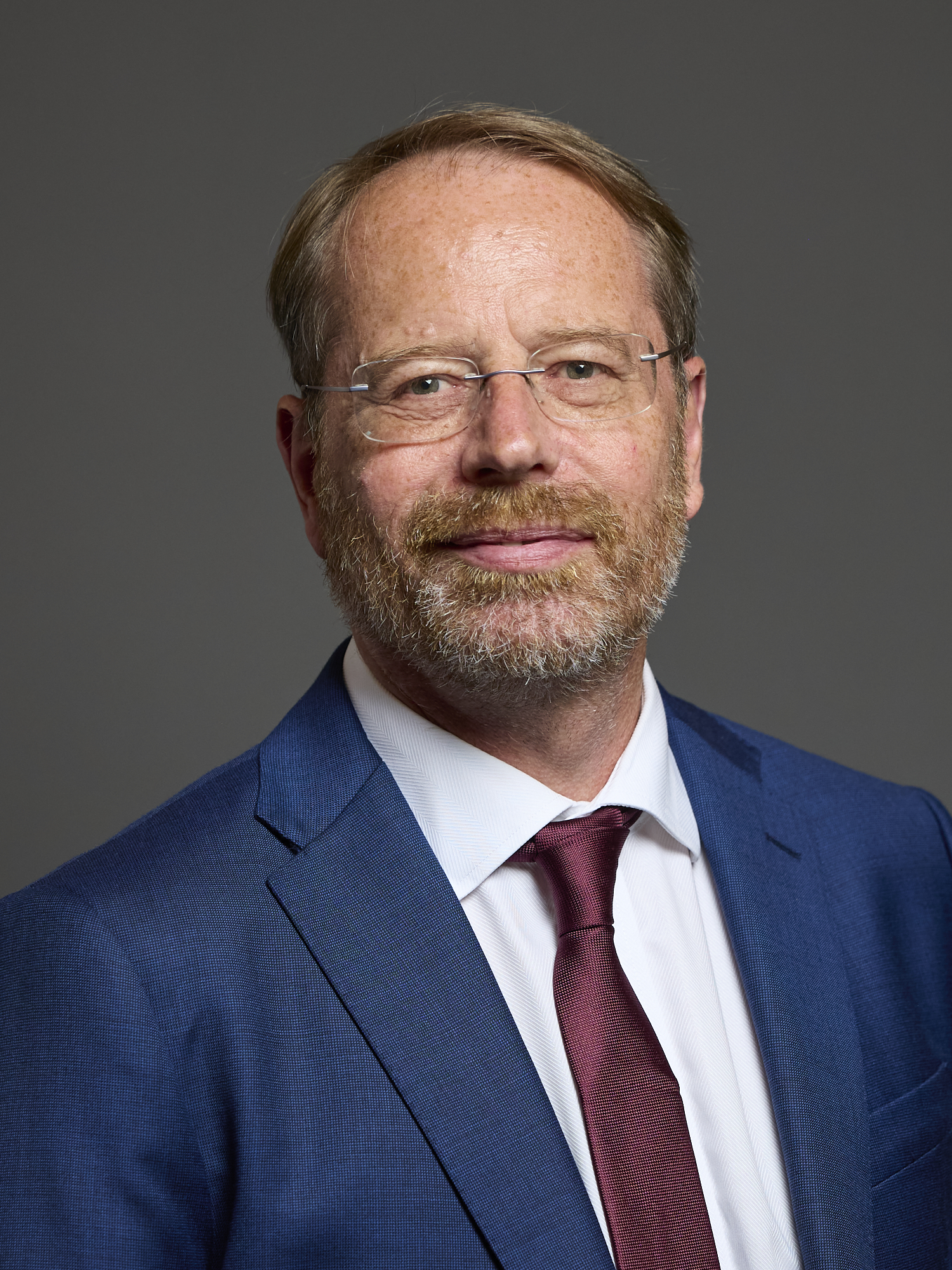
- Official portrait, 2024

Member of Parliament for Rossendale and Darwen
- Incumbent
- Assumed office 4 July 2024
- Preceded by: Jake Berry
- Majority: 5,628 (12.6%)

Member of Rossendale Borough Council for Greensclough
- In office 5 May 2011 – 7 May 2015

Member of Rossendale Borough Council for Irwell Hareholme (2016–2021) Stacksteads (2021–2023)
- In office 5 May 2016 – 2 May 2024

Personal details
- Born: Andrew Clive Mitchell MacNae; 29 April 1965 (age 61)
- Party: Labour
- Education: Sir John Deane's College
- Alma mater: University College London; University of Leeds; Alliance Manchester Business School (MBA)
- Website: www.andymacnaemp.com

Andy MacNae (born 29 April 1965) is a British Labour Party politician who has served as the Member of Parliament for Rossendale and Darwen since 2024.

== Education and professional career ==
MacNae was born in Southern England but moved around due to his father being in the Royal Air Force and later a commercial pilot. MacNae's mother Morag was Scottish and her maiden name was McNee. MacNae's maternal grandmother Charlotte R McNee stood unsuccessfully for the Liberals in the former parliamentary constituency of Edinburgh Pentlands in the 1950 general election. The family lived for some time in Scotland and Manchester before moving to Northwich in Cheshire, living in the Winnington area of the town.

MacNae attended Sir John Deane's College before going to University College London to study astrophysics. In 1994 he gained a Masters qualification in Environmental Pollution Control from the University of Leeds. He went on to earn a Master of Business Administration degree from the Alliance Manchester Business School.

At university he became an avid mountaineer, joining the North London Mountaineering Club and climbing Mount Kenya along with a 1988 climb of Shani Peak in the Karakoram range. He also climbed routes in the Alps, routes in Zimbabwe and an attempt at Meru Peak. In 1992 MacNae made the second ever ascent of Chomochior in the Kishtwar Himalaya. In 1994 he was the party leader for a climb on Gasherbrum IV and then in 1996 to scale Baintha Brakk. In 1999 he climbed numerous glaciers within the Schweizerland range in Greenland.

MacNae joined the British Mountaineering Council (BMC) in 1995 and rose to become the National Officer and Deputy Chief Executive of the organisation. He left the BMC in December 2002. He progressed to become Chief Executive of Mountain Services (UK mountaineering’s commercial arm) at the Mountain Heritage Trust. A keen cyclist, he was a trustee of Cycling UK. Between 2017 and 2024 he was the Chief Executive of Venture Xtreme Consultancy Limited, a company that specialises in adventure sports. He also had a business restoring period homes.

In 2004 he was appointed to lead the People Encouraging Enterprise in Rossendale organisation which uses community and grassroot networks to support beginning entrepreneurs and businesses. In 2007 the organisation won an award for making Rossendale the most enterprising area of the North West.

== Political career ==
MacNae was elected as a councillor on Rossendale Borough Council in the 2011 election gaining the ward of Greensclough from the Conservatives. He lost the ward in the 2015 election by 10 votes before being reelected in the 2016 election for the ward of Hareholme. In the 2021 election he won the ward of Stacksteads. In the 2023 election he gained the seat of Irwell from the Conservatives. As a councillor he held portfolio roles in leisure and regeneration.

In the 2024 general election MacNae won the parliamentary constituency of Rossendale and Darwen defeating Jake Berry who had held the seat since the 2010 general election. He had originally run for selection for the constituency in 2013 but lost out to Will Straw who failed to win the seat at the 2015 general election. In the 2017 general election and the 2019 general election the seat had an all-women shortlist to decide on a candidate.

In Parliament he is a member of the Red Wall Caucus. He made his maiden speech in a debate on immigration. In 2025 MacNae led a debate on baby loss sharing his own personal story of his daughter's death which Wes Streeting, the Secretary of State for Health and Social Care, described as "poignant" and praised MacNae for being "a voice to many fathers and partners who too often feel airbrushed from the conversation and absent from consideration."

In Parliament he has repeatedly called for the reinstating of a rail link between Rossendale and Manchester and was part of a group of MP's that produced a report calling for wider access to nature rights in England. He has also campaigned for changes to private parking to prevent unfair fines and to raise standards in the parking industry. He has also repeatedly called for changes to how road works are carried in order to lessen disruption.

After helping secure an eight billion pound order of 20 Eurofighter Typhoons from Turkey in 2025, MacNae called on the government to place a domestic order of the jets for the Royal Air Force to "secure that sovereign capability, that production base, that competitive position for the next decade and more."

His office has been named as the most active MP's office and he himself has been named as one of the most active MP's in the country. During a Prime Minister's Questions MacNae criticised Reform UK led Lancashire County Council for cutting nursery funding to which Richard Tice was reprimanded by Nusrat Ghani, the Chairman of Ways and Means for comments he made about MacNae in response.

MacNae wrote an article in The New Statesman suggesting that the government should stop relying so heavily on Office for Budget Responsibility forecasts and that it should reduce its output of forecasts to one a year to avoid short-term thinking. This was then implemented by Rachel Reeves in the 2025 budget. He has called for changes to The Green Book which he argues is biased towards southern and more affluent areas and that it needs to be amended to better support northern England.

Following Andy Burnham becoming prime minister MacNae convened a new group called the Reindustrialisation Research Group (ReRG) which, in an article on LabourList MacNae outlined, seeks to "bring good jobs, opportunity and hope back into every community" and "reversing deindustrialisation".

He chairs 4 All-party parliamentary groups (APPG): Outdoor Recreation and Access to Nature, Baby Loss, Transport Safety, and Terrorism and Security. He is also vice chair of the Sport APPG and treasurer of the Cycling and Walking group.

== Personal life ==
MacNae and his wife Vanessa live in the borough of Rossendale. Vanessa is a health visitor. They have had two children together – a son, and a daughter who died soon after birth due to Edwards syndrome.

== Publications ==
- MacNae, Andy; Last, Adge; Newton, Andy (2000). Safety on Mountains. British Mountaineering Council. ISBN 978-0-903908-27-6.
- MacNae, Andy (1994). "Avoiding the Chamonix Trade Routes" (PDF). Alpine Journal. Alpine Club: 35–38.
- MacNae, Andy (2017). "The Future of the MEF" (PDF). Alpine Journal. Alpine Club: 135–138.
- MacNae, Andy (14 July 2025). "The OBR is always wrong". The New Statesman. Archived from the original on 20 July 2025.
- MacNae, Andy (18 December 2025). "'The OBR and fiscal rules are fuelling the uncertainty they were supposed to end'". LabourList. Archived from the original on 18 December 2025.
- MacNae, Andy (16 July 2026). "'Reversing deindustrialisation must be central to writing a new story for Britain'". LabourList. Archived from the original on 19 July 2026.
