= 2012 Rossendale Borough Council election =

2012 UK local government election

Map of the results of the 2012 Rossendale council election. Labour in red, Conservatives in blue and independent in light grey. Wards in dark grey were not contested in 2012.

Elections to Rossendale Borough Council were held on 3 May 2012.

Councillors elected in 2008 were defending their seats this year, with their vote share change compared to that year.

== Election result ==
Rossendale local election result 2012
Party	Seats	Gains	Losses	Net gain/loss	Seats %	Votes %	Votes	+/−
Conservative								
Liberal Democrats								
Labour								
National Front								
Independent								

== Ward results ==
Cribden
Party	Candidate	Votes	%	±%
Labour	Andrea Fletcher	622	62.7	+27.3
Conservative	Sandra McWicker	295	29.7	−5.7
Liberal Democrats	Graham Fox	75	7.6	−23.4

Eden
Party	Candidate	Votes	%	±%
Conservative	Darryl Smith	577	66.1	−13.4
Labour	Janice Johnson	296	33.9	+13.4

Facit and Shawforth
Party	Candidate	Votes	%	±%
Independent	Madeline de Souza	512	59.2	N/A
Conservative	Lynda Barnes	238	27.5	−1.5
Liberal Democrats	Lesley Ham	115	13.3	−12.4

Goodshaw
Party	Candidate	Votes	%	±%
Labour	Dorothy Farrington	862	74.6	+19.3
Conservative	Dean Bartlett-Smith	293	25.4	−19.3

Greenfield
Party	Candidate	Votes	%	±%
Conservative	Gladys Sandiford	894	61.1	+0.3
Labour	Gladys Sandiford	569	38.9	+21.1

Greensclough
Party	Candidate	Votes	%	±%
Labour	Barbara Ashworth	726	51.0	+24.9
Conservative	Judith Driver	505	35.5	−7.7
Liberal Democrats	Bill Jackson	193	13.6	−0.2

Hareholme
Party	Candidate	Votes	%	±%
Labour	Caroline Bleakley	805	55.3	8.6
Conservative	Michael Pickup	560	38.4	−14.9
Liberal Democrats	Joseph Donnelly	92	6.3	N/A

Helmshore
Party	Candidate	Votes	%	±%
Conservative	Peter Evans	674	37.7	−22.4
Labour	John McManus	566	31.7	+12.0
Independent	Vernon Hudson	548	30.6	N/A

Irwell
Party	Candidate	Votes	%	±%
Labour	Steve Hughes	551	51.9	+16.9
Conservative	Hazel Steen	340	32.0	−9.1
National Front	Kevin Bryan	170	16.0	N/A

Longholme
Party	Candidate	Votes	%	±%
Labour	Roy Knowles	757	54.1	+22.1
Conservative	Mohammed Abdullah	401	28.6	−16.3
Liberal Democrats	Clive Laight	242	17.3	N/A

Whitewell
Party	Candidate	Votes	%	±%
Labour	Karen Creaser	543	42.7	
Liberal Democrats	Tim Nuttall	480	37.8	
Conservative	Peter Steen	248	19.5	

Worsley
Party	Candidate	Votes	%	±%
Labour	Marilyn Procter	663	53.1	+4.6
Labour	Marilyn Procter	663	53.1	+4.6
UKIP	Granville Barker	218	17.5	N/A
Conservative	David Stansfield	368	29.5	−22.0
