= Chris Clarkson (politician) =

British Conservative politician

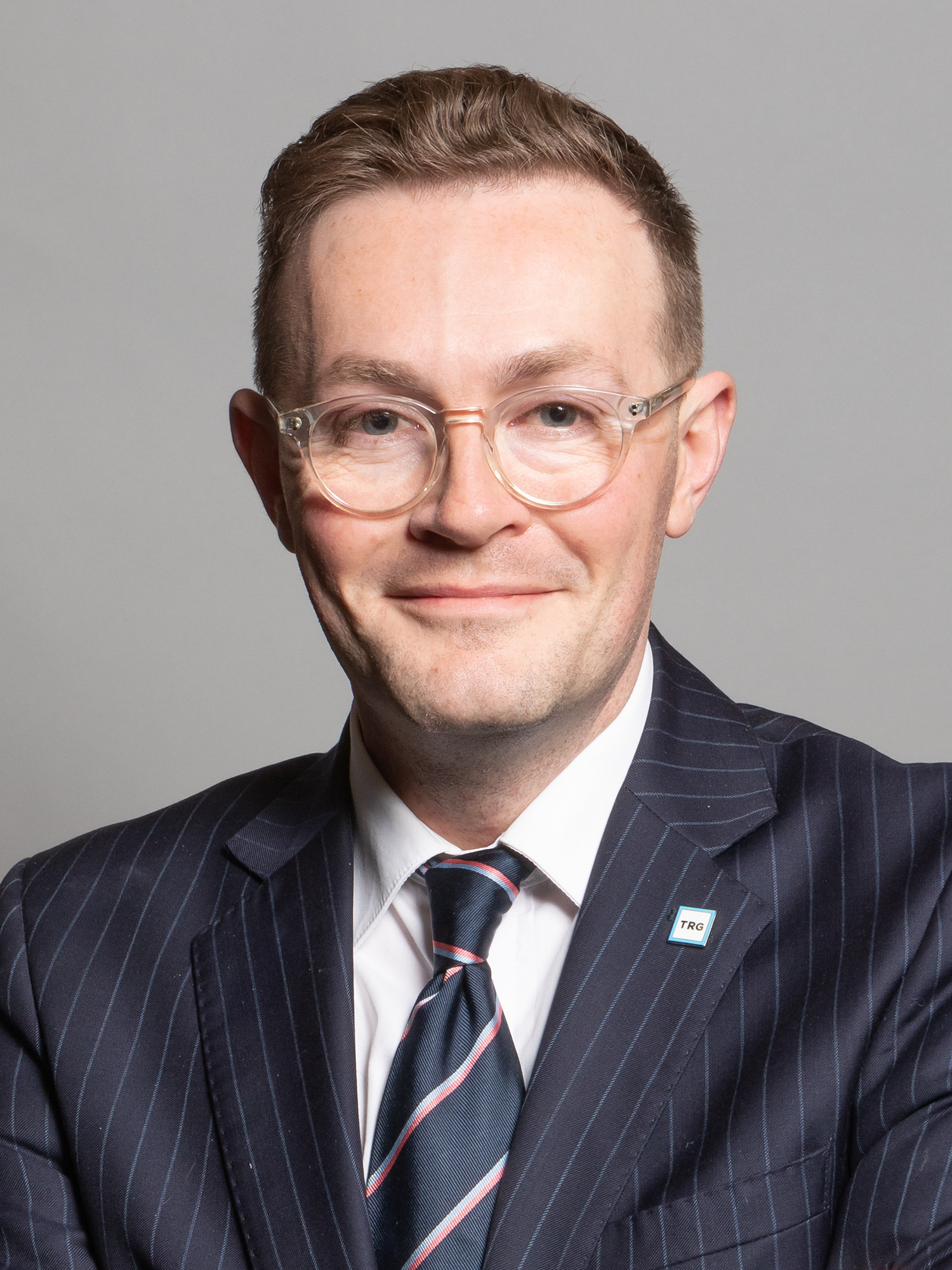
- Official portrait, 2020

Member of Parliament for Heywood and Middleton
- In office 12 December 2019 – 30 May 2024
- Preceded by: Liz McInnes
- Succeeded by: Elsie Blundell

Personal details
- Born: Christopher Mark Clarkson; 12 November 1982 (age 43) Wegberg, North Rhine-Westphalia, West Germany
- Party: Conservative
- Education: University of Dundee

Christopher Mark Clarkson (born 12 November 1982) is a British Conservative Party politician who was Member of Parliament (MP) for Heywood & Middleton from 2019 to 2024. Before entering Parliament, Clarkson was a Salford City Councillor for Worsley.

== Early life and career ==
Chris Clarkson was born on 12 November 1982 to Terence Clarkson and Alison Clarkson (née Parker) in Wegberg, West Germany. He grew up in Blackburn, Lancashire where he attended St Wilfrid's Church of England High School, before studying law at Dundee University. He then worked for IRIS Legal as a corporate development manager, and was a consultant at Virgin from 2010 to 2019.

Clarkson is a member of the Countryside Alliance and a supporter of Brexit. Prior to being elected to Parliament, he was a Salford City councillor between 2011 and 2019. Whilst on the council, he was chair of the Audit and Accounts Committee from 2016 to 2018.

== Parliamentary career ==
At the 2015 general election, Clarkson stood as the Conservative candidate in Wallasey, coming second with 22.7% of the vote behind the incumbent Labour MP Angela Eagle.

Clarkson was elected to Parliament as MP for Heywood and Middleton at the 2019 general election with 43.1% of the vote and a majority of 663.

On 22 October 2020, Clarkson criticised Mayor of Greater Manchester Andy Burnham in a parliamentary debate over his disagreements with the government concerning financial support for stricter COVID-19 restrictions, accusing Burnham of "opportunism". In response, Clarkson was called "scum" by Deputy Leader of the Labour Party Angela Rayner. She later apologised, stating: "I apologise for the language that I used in a heated debate in Parliament earlier".

On 10 November 2020, Clarkson was appointed as Parliamentary private secretary to the Ministry of Justice.

In November 2022, following the outcome of a coroner's court hearing into the 2020 death of Awaab Ishak, Clarkson called the company who provided the housing (Rochdale Boroughwide Housing, or RBH) "modern day slum lords". He said that he has photographs from his constituents living in RBH properties showing that the poor living conditions seen in Ishak's home were "not an isolated incident".

Although Clarkson announced in June 2023 that he would not seek re-election as an MP at the 2024 general election, on the grounds that his Heywood and Middleton constituency was being abolished, it was announced on 3 June 2024 that he had been selected as the Conservative candidate for Stratford-on-Avon at the 2024 general election. This proved controversial, with the Conservative group leader on Stratford on Avon District Council accusing the party of overlooking women and how local members did not know who was on the shortlist until arriving at the meeting. Clarkson failed to win the Stratford-on-Avon seat, losing to the Liberal Democrats' Manuela Perteghella.

== Post-parliamentary career ==
Since his defeat at the 2024 general election, Clarkson has worked as a communications consultant.

== Personal life ==
Clarkson is a member of the Carlton Club in London, and St James' Club in Manchester.

Parliament of the United Kingdom
Preceded by Liz McInnes	Member of Parliament for Heywood and Middleton; 2019–2024	Constituency abolished
