= Jim Dobbin =

British politician (1941–2014)

Jim Dobbin KSG KMCO

Member of Parliament for Heywood and Middleton
- In office 1 May 1997 – 6 September 2014
- Preceded by: Jim Callaghan
- Succeeded by: Liz McInnes

Personal details
- Born: James Dobbin; 26 May 1941 Fife, Scotland
- Died: 6 September 2014 (aged 73) Słupsk, Poland
- Party: Labour and Co-operative
- Spouse: Patricia Russell (m. 1964)
- Children: 4
- Education: Napier College
- Profession: Microbiologist

James Dobbin KSG KMCO (26 May 1941 – 6 September 2014) was a British politician and microbiologist who served as Member of Parliament (MP) for Heywood and Middleton from 1997 until his death in 2014.

== Early life ==
Jim Dobbin was born in Fife, Scotland, the son of a coal miner, and educated at Catholic schools. He later studied bacteriology and virology at Napier College, Edinburgh.

He worked as a microbiologist within the NHS for 33 years until 1994, mainly at the Royal Oldham Hospital. He was elected chairman of the Rochdale Constituency Labour Party for a year in 1980.

== Political career ==
In 1983 he was elected as a councillor in the Metropolitan Borough of Rochdale, becoming the Labour group leader in 1994, and became the leader of the council in 1996. He stepped down from both the National Health Service (NHS) and the council at Rochdale on his election to the House of Commons. In 1992 he had unsuccessfully contested the Bury North seat, coming second to the sitting Conservative MP Alistair Burt, by 4,764 votes.

Dobbin was elected to the House of Commons at the 1997 General Election for the safe Labour seat of Heywood and Middleton on the retirement of the Labour MP Jim Callaghan. He held the seat comfortably with a majority of 17,542 and remained its MP for the rest of his life. He made his maiden speech on 30 July 1997. He was a member of the European Scrutiny Select committee from 1998 to 2014.

In February 2012, he signed a petition sponsored by the Coalition for Marriage which states "I support the legal definition of marriage which is the voluntary union for life of one man and one woman to the exclusion of all others. I oppose any attempt to redefine it."

In February 2013, Dobbin voted against the second reading of the Marriage (Same Sex Couples) Act 2013. Subsequently, in May 2013 the MP voted against the bill's third and final reading, opposing the legalisation of same-sex marriage within England and Wales.

Dobbin was heavily criticised for his rudeness to cyclists on the "House of Commons Transport Select Committee to Discuss Cycling" in December 2013.

=== Expenses ===
Dobbin employed his wife to be his secretary in the House of Commons, a practice which has attracted significant national debate, but remains permissible under House of Commons rules. Rochdale council leader Colin Lambert, Labour councillor Alan Godson, as well as former Labour councillor Brian Leather, were employed by Dobbin, and remunerated from his parliamentary expenses.

In May 2009 it was revealed that Dobbin claimed more public funds for staff than the other MPs in Greater Manchester: £99,700. He defended this by observing that he also had the largest number of constituents. Nationally, he had one of the lowest overall expense bills, with 504 out of 646 MPs having higher expense claims than him.

== Death ==
Dobbin died in Słupsk, Poland, on 6 September 2014, aged 73. He was in the country for a Council of Europe visit, on which he was accompanied by John Prescott and MP Alan Meale. He had attended an official dinner during which the participants drank a shot of spirits between each course, and his blood alcohol level was 0.399, nearly five times the UK drink-drive limit. Having felt unwell at the end of the meal, he was taken to bed. During the night, his wife was unable to wake him and it was later discovered that food had entered his lungs thus stopping his breathing. His death was investigated by a British coroner who ruled 'death by misadventure'.

His funeral consisted of a Requiem Mass held at the Cathedral Church of St. John the Evangelist, the Roman Catholic cathedral in Salford, on 20 September 2014. It was attended by senior figures in the world of politics, including Ed Miliband, the leader of the Labour Party, and John Bercow, Speaker of the House of Commons. He was later interred during a private burial.

== Personal life ==
Dobbin chaired the All Party Parliamentary Pro-Life Group and campaigned strongly for a change to British abortion law. A devout Roman Catholic, he was awarded and invested as a Knight of the Pontifical Order of St Gregory the Great from Pope Benedict XVI. Dobbin was also honoured by the Sacred Military Constantinian Order of Saint George under the grandmastership of the Duke of Castro with the rank of Knight of Merit with Star.

He married Patricia Russell in 1964; the couple had two sons and two daughters.

Parliament of the United Kingdom
Preceded by Jim Callaghan	Member of Parliament for Heywood and Middleton; 1997–2014	Succeeded by Liz McInnes
