= 2015 Rossendale Borough Council election =

United Kingdom local election

The 2015 Rossendale Borough Council election took place on 7 May 2015 to elect members of the Rossendale Borough Council in England. It was held on the same day as other local elections.

Councillors elected in 2011 were defending their seats this year, and they were contested again in 2019.

== Election result ==
Rossendale local election result 2015
Party	Seats	Gains	Losses	Net gain/loss	Seats %	Votes %	Votes	+/−
Conservative	7							
Labour	7							
UKIP	0							
Green	0							
Independent	0							
Liberal Democrats	0							

== Ward results ==
=== Cribden ===
Cribden
Party	Candidate	Votes	%	±%
Labour	Christine Gill	828	40.4	
Conservative	Janet Graham	836	40.7	
Green	Angela Hall	108	5.3	
UKIP	Thomas Richardson	268	13.1	
Rejected ballots		11	0.5	
Majority		8	0.4	
Turnout		2,051	72.0	
Source returning officer.

=== Facit and Shawforth ===
Facit and Shawforth
Party	Candidate	Votes	%	±%
Labour	Thomas Aldred	565	31.1	
Conservative	Lynda Barnes	602	33.1	
Independent	Maureen Jones (Community First)	207	11.4	
UKIP	Max Lake	436	24.0	
Rejected ballots		8	0.4	
Majority		37	2.0	
Turnout		1,818	62.4	
Source returning officer.

=== Greenfield ===
Greenfield
Party	Candidate	Votes	%	±%
Labour	Hayden Kenyon	945	40.4	
Green	Terence Parker	162	5.3	
Conservative	Annabel Shipley	1,440	55.5	
UKIP	Alan Weaver	431	13.1	
Rejected ballots		13	4.0	
Majority		1,009	33.7	
Turnout		2,991	67.3	
Source returning officer.

=== Greensclough ===
Greensclough
Party	Candidate	Votes	%	±%
Labour	Andy MacNae	1,074	38.1	
UKIP	Susan Nangle	641	22.7	
Conservative	Peter Steen	1,084	38.5	
Rejected ballots		20	0.7	
Majority		10	0.4	
Turnout		2,819	69.3	
Source returning officer.

=== Hareholme ===
Hareholme
Party	Candidate	Votes	%	±%
UKIP	Clive Balchin	690	23.5	
Labour	Michael Marriott	1,209	41.2	
Conservative	Nicola May	1,018	34.7	
Rejected ballots		18	0.6	
Majority		191	6.5	
Turnout		2,935	69.3	
Source returning officer.

=== Healey and Whitworth ===
Healey and Whitworth
Party	Candidate	Votes	%	±%
UKIP	Martin Harrison	350	18.3	
Conservative	Dayne Powell	509	26.6	
Independent	Karen Ruane (Community First)	418	21.9	
Labour	Sean Serridge	627	32.8	
Rejected ballots		6	0.3	
Majority		118	6.2	
Turnout		1,910	62.1	
Source returning officer.

=== Helmshore ===
Helmshore
Party	Candidate	Votes	%	±%
Green	Anita Davies	175	4.9	
Labour	Emma Harding	1,049	29.5	
Conservative	Tony Haworth	1,894	53.3	
UKIP	Michael Pickup	423	11.9	
Rejected ballots		15	0.4	
Majority		845	23.8	
Turnout		3,556	74.0	
Source returning officer.

=== Irwell ===
Irwell
Party	Candidate	Votes	%	±%
Conservative	Janet Eaton	967		
Labour	Michelle Smith	884		
Conservative	Laura-Beth Thompson	790		
Labour	Andrew Walmsley	803		
UKIP	John Wells	608		
Green	Hilary Whitehead	197		
Rejected ballots		4		
Majority				
Turnout		2,541	60.7	
Source returning officer.

=== Longholme ===
Longholme
Party	Candidate	Votes	%	±%
UKIP	Gary Barnes	509		
Conservative	Mischa Charlton-Mockett	1,082		
Green	Karen Pollard-Rylance	162		
Labour	Samuel Smallridge	1,142		
Rejected ballots		12		
Majority		60		
Turnout		2,907	69.3	
Source returning officer.

=== Stacksteads ===
Stacksteads
Party	Candidate	Votes	%	±%
UKIP	Donald Gordon	343		
Labour	Christine Lamb	919		
Conservative	Hazel Steen	495		
Rejected ballots		11		
Majority		424		
Turnout		1,768	33.8	
Source returning officer.

=== Whitewell ===
Whitewell
Party	Candidate	Votes	%	±%
Conservative	Sarah Collinge	861		
UKIP	Susan Francis	615		
Labour	Valerie Hogan	807		
Liberal Democrats	William Nuttall	611		
Green	John Payne	308		
Conservative	Jennifer Rigby	746		
Labour	Amanda Robertson	518		
Rejected ballots		13		
Majority				
Turnout		2,852	65.5	
Source returning officer.

=== Worsley ===
Worsley
Party	Candidate	Votes	%	±%
UKIP	Granville Barker	575		
Labour	Adrian Lythgoe	1,203		
Conservative	David Stansfield	779		
Rejected ballots		22		
Majority		337	28.9	
Turnout		2,603	60.3	
Source returning officer.
