= Heywood and Middleton North =

UK Parliament constituency (since 1983)

Coordinates: 53°34′N 2°13′W

- County constituency for the House of Commons
- Interactive map of boundaries since 2024
- Boundary within North West England
- County: Greater Manchester
- Electorate: 73,306 (March 2020)
- Major settlements: Heywood, Middleton, Castleton, Langley

Current constituency
- Created: 1983 (as Heywood and Middleton)
- Member of Parliament: Elsie Blundell (Labour)
- Seats: One
- Created from: Heywood and Royton; Middleton and Prestwich

Heywood and Middleton North is a constituency in Greater Manchester represented in the House of Commons of the UK Parliament since 2024 by Elsie Blundell of the Labour Party.

Before the 2024 general election, the constituency was known as Heywood and Middleton. The 2023 review of Westminster constituencies proposed that two of the Middleton wards be included in a new constituency named Blackley and Middleton South and this seat be renamed Heywood and Middleton North.

== Constituency profile ==
The constituency covers the west half of the Metropolitan Borough of Rochdale, including the towns of Heywood and half of the town of Middleton, and some of the western fringes of Rochdale itself such as Castleton, and Spotland and Falinge. Norden and Bamford are strong Conservative areas, with several million-pound houses, but all other wards are mostly favourable to Labour. The part of Middleton in this constituency includes the large overspill council estate of Langley.

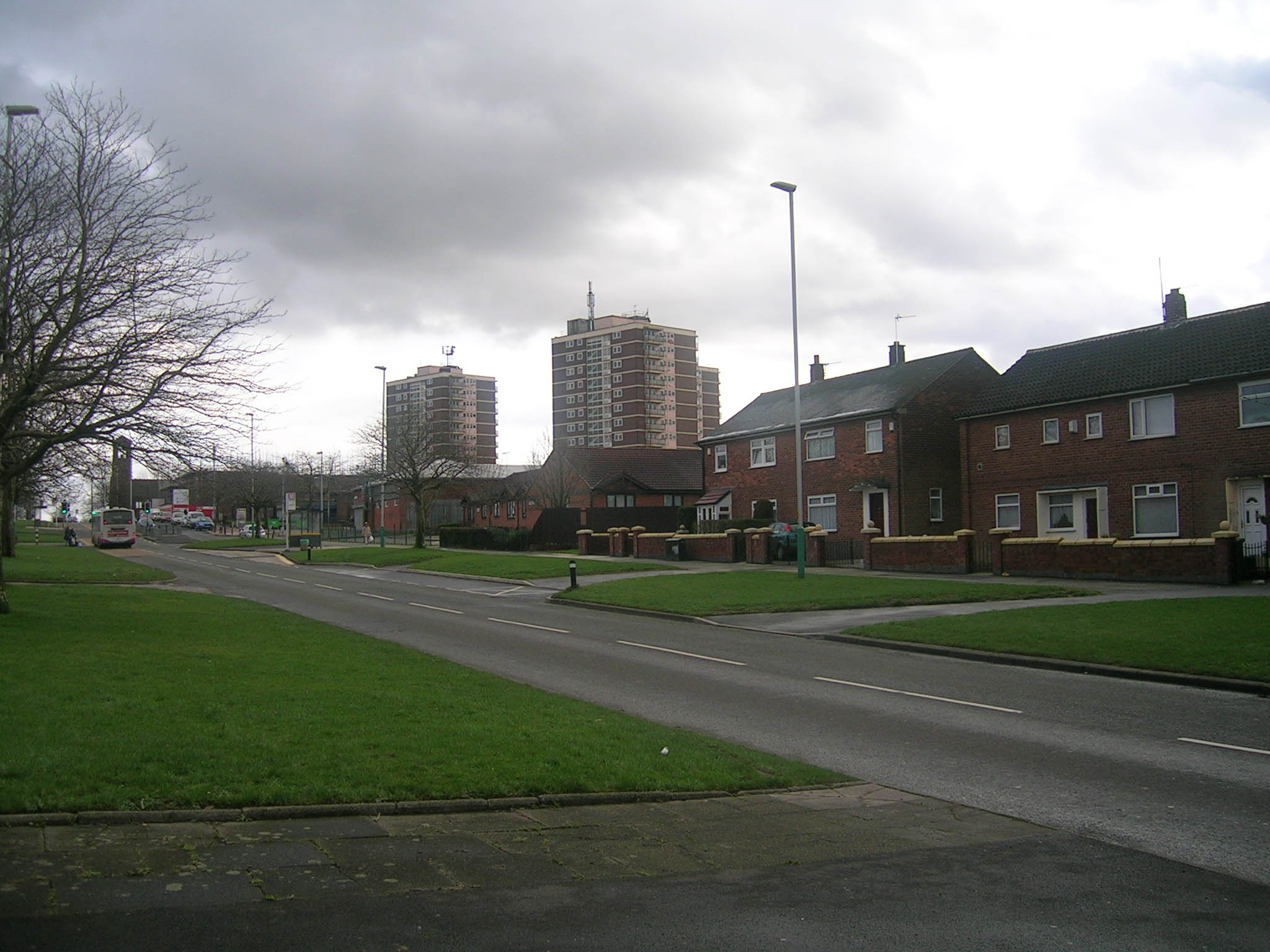
Wood Street, Langley, Middleton

The 2024 boundary changes added the ward of Spotland and Falinge, a ward close to Rochdale town centre, to the constituency, in place of East and South Middleton, including the relatively affluent area of Alkrington Garden Village, which were added to the new Blackley and Middleton South constituency.

Electoral Calculus categorises the seat as a "Somewhere" demographic, indicating socially conservative, economically soft left views and strong support for Brexit.

== History ==
The constituency was created in 1983 from parts of the former seats of Heywood and Royton and Middleton and Prestwich and was held by the Labour Party since then until the 2019 Election.

From 1983 until his retirement in 1997, the MP was Jim Callaghan, not to be confused with a former Prime Minister with the same name.

In a 2014 by-election UKIP came within 617 votes of winning the seat, which was on the same day as the Clacton by-election, and in 2015 it produced one of their largest results in the country. Subsequently, the constituency heavily voted to Leave in the EU referendum and swung to the Conservatives for the first time in 2019, in line with many other Leave-voting Labour seats in the North and Midlands.

Under the 2023 boundary changes, it was estimated that the newly named seat would notionally have been held by Labour on a slim majority. As a result, the sitting Conservative MP, Chris Clarkson, decided not to stand in 2024 and he was selected for the previously safe seat of Stratford-on-Avon, where he was defeated. The Labour Party candidate, Elsie Blundell, duly won this seat with a majority of 16.4% over Reform UK, with the Conservatives dropping down to third place.

== Boundaries ==
=== Historic (Heywood and Middleton) ===
Map of boundaries 2010–2024

1983–1997: The Borough of Rochdale wards of Heywood North, Heywood South, Heywood West, Middleton Central, Middleton East, Middleton North, Middleton South, and Middleton West.

1997–2010: The Borough of Rochdale wards of Castleton, Heywood North, Heywood South, Heywood West, Middleton Central, Middleton East, Middleton North, Middleton South, Middleton West, and Norden and Bamford.

2010–2024: The Borough of Rochdale wards of Bamford, Castleton, East Middleton, Hopwood Hall, Norden, North Heywood, North Middleton, South Middleton, West Heywood, and West Middleton.

=== Current (Heywood and Middleton North) ===
Further to the 2023 boundary review, the composition of the constituency was defined as follows from the 2024 general election (as they existed on 1 December 2020):

- The Borough of Rochdale wards of Bamford, Castleton, Hopwood Hall, Norden, North Heywood, North Middleton, Spotland and Falinge, West Heywood, and West Middleton.

East Middleton and South Middleton wards were transferred to the new constituency of Blackley and Middleton South, partly compensated by the addition of the Spotland and Falinge ward from Rochdale.

== Members of Parliament ==
Election	Member	Party
1983	Jim Callaghan	Labour
1997	Jim Dobbin	Labour Co-op
2014 by-election	Liz McInnes	Labour
2019	Chris Clarkson	Conservative
2024	Elsie Blundell	Labour

== Elections ==
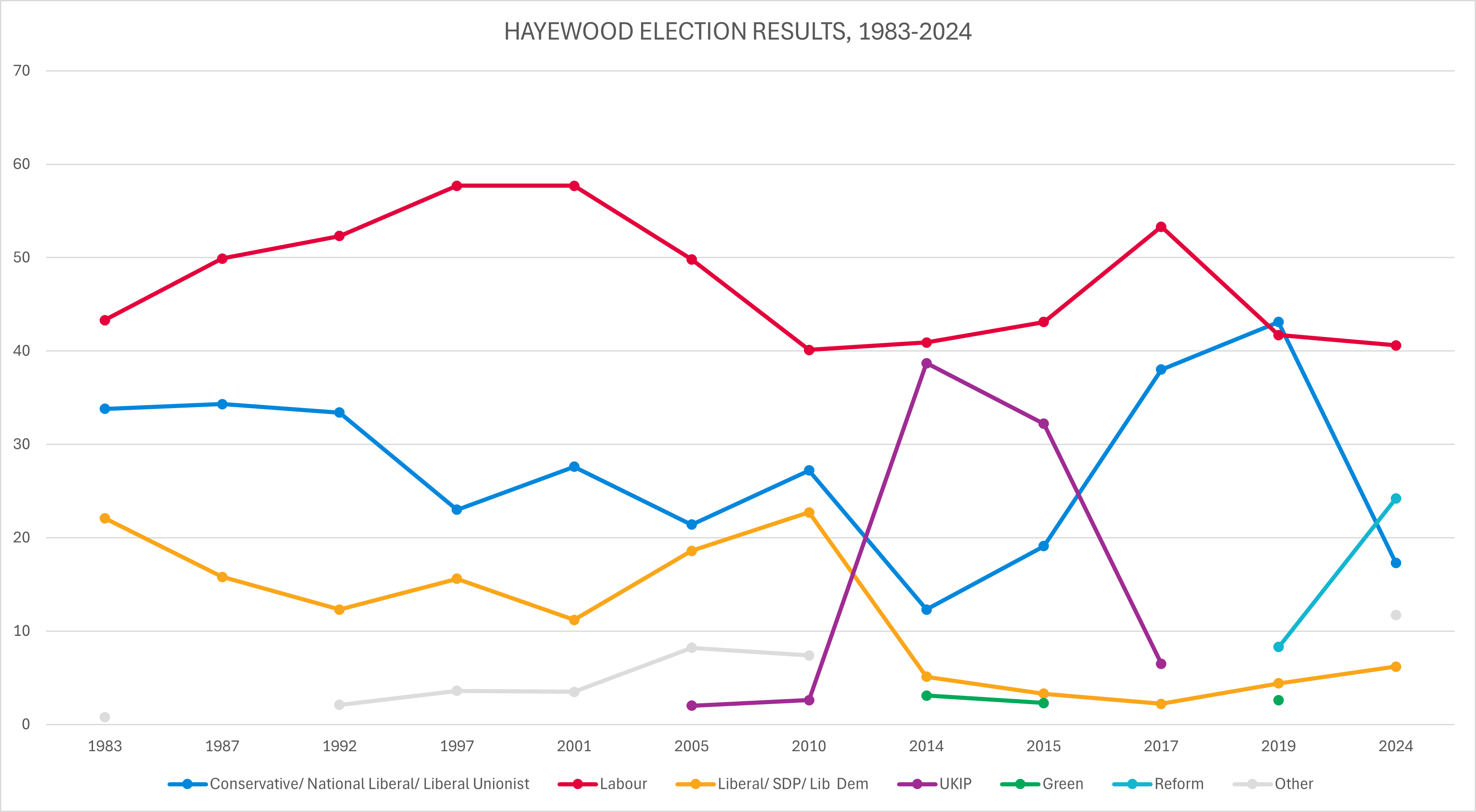
Election results 1983-2024

=== Elections in the 2020s ===
General election 2024: Heywood and Middleton North
Party	Candidate	Votes	%	±%
Labour	Elsie Blundell	15,069	40.6	−2.5
Reform	Steve Potter	8,987	24.2	+15.8
Conservative	Laura-Beth Thompson	6,423	17.3	−24.2
Independent	Chris Furlong	4,349	11.7	N/A
Liberal Democrats	Tom Shaw	2,302	6.2	+2.0
Majority		6,082	16.4	+14.8
Turnout		37,130	49.6	−8.3
Registered electors		74,786		
Labour hold		Swing	−9.1	

Heywood and Middleton North was the only constituency (in England or Wales) where the Green Party of England and Wales did not stand a 2024 candidate. This was because the Green Party of England and Wales officially endorsed independent candidate Chris Furlong.

=== Elections in the 2010s ===
2019 notional result
Party	Vote	%
Labour	18,281	43.1
Conservative	17,601	41.5
Brexit Party	3,581	8.4
Liberal Democrats	1,787	4.2
Green	1,196	2.8
Turnout	42,446	57.9
Electorate	73,306	

General election 2019: Heywood and Middleton
Party	Candidate	Votes	%	±%
Conservative	Chris Clarkson	20,453	43.1	+5.1
Labour	Liz McInnes	19,790	41.7	−11.6
Brexit Party	Colin Lambert	3,952	8.3	N/A
Liberal Democrats	Anthony Smith	2,073	4.4	+2.2
Green	Nigel Ainsworth-Barnes	1,220	2.6	N/A
Majority		663	1.4	
Turnout		47,488	59.2	–3.2
Conservative gain from Labour		Swing	+8.4	

General election 2017: Heywood and Middleton
Party	Candidate	Votes	%	±%
Labour	Liz McInnes	26,578	53.3	+10.2
Conservative	Chris Clarkson	18,961	38.0	+18.9
UKIP	Lee Seville	3,239	6.5	−25.7
Liberal Democrats	Bill Winlow	1,087	2.2	−1.1
Majority		7,617	15.3	+4.4
Turnout		49,865	62.4	+1.7
Labour hold		Swing	−4.4	

General election 2015: Heywood and Middleton
Party	Candidate	Votes	%	±%
Labour	Liz McInnes	20,926	43.1	+3.0
UKIP	John Bickley	15,627	32.2	+29.6
Conservative	Iain Gartside	9,268	19.1	−8.1
Liberal Democrats	Anthony Smith	1,607	3.3	−19.4
Green	Abi Jackson	1,110	2.3	N/A
Majority		5,299	10.9	−2.0
Turnout		48,538	60.7	+3.2
Labour hold		Swing	−16.3	

2014 Heywood and Middleton by-election
Party	Candidate	Votes	%	±%
Labour	Liz McInnes	11,633	40.9	+0.8
UKIP	John Bickley	11,016	38.7	+36.1
Conservative	Iain Gartside	3,496	12.3	−14.9
Liberal Democrats	Anthony Smith	1,457	5.1	−17.6
Green	Abi Jackson	870	3.1	N/A
Majority		617	2.2	−10.7
Turnout		28,472	36.0	−21.5
Labour hold		Swing	−18.5	

General election 2010: Heywood and Middleton
Party	Candidate	Votes	%	±%
Labour Co-op	Jim Dobbin	18,499	40.1	−8.2
Conservative	Mike Holly	12,528	27.2	+5.4
Liberal Democrats	Wera Hobhouse	10,474	22.7	+2.5
BNP	Peter Greenwood	3,239	7.0	+2.6
UKIP	Victoria Cecil	1,215	2.6	+0.7
Independent	Chrissy Lee	170	0.4	N/A
Majority		5,971	12.9	−13.6
Turnout		46,125	57.5	+3.7
Labour Co-op hold		Swing	−6.8	

=== Elections in the 2000s ===
General election 2005: Heywood and Middleton
Party	Candidate	Votes	%	±%
Labour Co-op	Jim Dobbin	19,438	49.8	−7.9
Conservative	Stephen Pathmarajah	8,355	21.4	−6.2
Liberal Democrats	Crea Lavin	7,261	18.6	+7.4
BNP	Gary Aronsson	1,855	4.7	N/A
Liberal	Philip Burke	1,377	3.5	+0.9
UKIP	John Whittaker	767	2.0	N/A
Majority		11,083	28.4	−1.7
Turnout		39,053	54.6	+1.5
Labour Co-op hold		Swing	−0.9	

General election 2001: Heywood and Middleton
Party	Candidate	Votes	%	±%
Labour Co-op	Jim Dobbin	22,377	57.7	±0.0
Conservative	Marilyn Hopkins	10,707	27.6	+4.6
Liberal Democrats	Ian Greenhalgh	4,329	11.2	−4.4
Liberal	Philip Burke	1,021	2.6	+1.1
Christian Democrats	Christine West	345	0.9	N/A
Majority		11,670	30.1	−4.6
Turnout		38,779	53.1	−15.3
Labour Co-op hold		Swing	−2.3	

=== Elections in the 1990s ===
General election 1997: Heywood and Middleton
Party	Candidate	Votes	%	±%
Labour Co-op	Jim Dobbin	29,179	57.7	+11.2
Conservative	Sebastian Grigg	11,637	23.0	−8.6
Liberal Democrats	David Clayton	7,908	15.6	−4.3
Referendum	Christine West	1,076	2.1	N/A
Liberal	Philip Burke	750	1.5	−0.3
Majority		17,542	34.7	+15.8
Turnout		50,550	68.4	−6.5
Labour Co-op hold		Swing		

General election 1992: Heywood and Middleton
Party	Candidate	Votes	%	±%
Labour	Jim Callaghan	22,380	52.3	+2.4
Conservative	Eric Ollerenshaw	14,306	33.4	−0.9
Liberal Democrats	Michael B. Taylor	5,252	12.3	−3.5
Liberal	Philip Burke	757	1.8	N/A
Natural Law	Anne-Marie Scott	134	0.3	N/A
Majority		8,074	18.9	+3.3
Turnout		42,829	74.9	+1.1
Labour hold		Swing	+1.6	

=== Elections in the 1980s ===
General election 1987: Heywood and Middleton
Party	Candidate	Votes	%	±%
Labour	Jim Callaghan	21,900	49.9	+6.6
Conservative	Roy Walker	15,052	34.3	+0.5
SDP	Ian Greenhalgh	6,953	15.8	−6.3
Majority		6,848	15.6	+6.1
Turnout		43,905	73.8	+3.9
Labour hold		Swing	+3.2	

General election 1983: Heywood and Middleton
Party	Candidate	Votes	%	±%
Labour	Jim Callaghan	18,111	43.3	
Conservative	Christine Hodgson	14,137	33.8	
SDP	Arthur Rumbelow	9,262	22.1	
BNP	Kenneth Henderson	316	0.8	
Majority		3,974	9.5	
Turnout		41,826	69.9	
Labour win (new seat)				

== See also ==
- parliamentary constituencies in Greater Manchester
