= 2006 Rossendale Borough Council election =

2006 UK local government election

Elections to Rossendale Borough Council were held on 4 May 2006. One third of the council was up for election and the Conservative party stayed in overall control of the council.

After the election, the composition of the council was

- Conservative 25
- Labour 9
- Liberal Democrat 1
- Independent 1

== Election result ==
Rossendale local election result 2006
Party	Seats	Gains	Losses	Net gain/loss	Seats %	Votes %	Votes	+/−
Conservative	7	3	1	+2	53.8	47.1	7,928	-3.8%
Labour	5	1	2	-1	38.5	35.2	5,924	-4.3%
Independent	1	0	0	0	7.7	3.5	587	+3.5%
Liberal Democrats	0	0	1	-1	0	10.2	1,714	+0.6%
BNP	0	0	0	0	0	2.2	369	+2.2%
Green	0	0	0	0	0	1.8	299	+1.8%

== Ward results ==
Eden (2)
Party	Candidate	Votes	%	±%
Conservative	Jeffrey Cheetham	684		
Conservative	Darryl Smith	666		
Labour	William Barnfield	415		
Turnout		1,765	40.3	−9.7
Conservative hold		Swing		
Conservative hold		Swing		

Goodshaw
Party	Candidate	Votes	%	±%
Labour	Alyson Barnes	596	53.0	+3.8
Conservative	Helen Marsden	528	47.0	−3.8
Majority		68	6.0	
Turnout		1,124	36.7	−11.3
Labour hold		Swing		

Greenfield
Party	Candidate	Votes	%	±%
Conservative	Richard Morris	684	44.4	+3.3
Liberal Democrats	Catherine Pilling	582	37.8	+0.4
Labour	Jennifer Shilliday	275	17.8	−3.7
Majority		102	6.6	+2.9
Turnout		1,541	36.3	−12.7
Conservative gain from Liberal Democrats		Swing		

Greensclough
Party	Candidate	Votes	%	±%
Conservative	James Eaton	876	49.6	+12.3
Liberal Democrats	Michael Carr	512	29.0	−6.1
Labour	Elizabeth Thomas	379	21.4	−6.2
Majority		364	20.6	+18.4
Turnout		1,767	40.6	−4.4
Conservative hold		Swing		

Hareholme
Party	Candidate	Votes	%	±%
Labour	Peter Gill	803	53.4	+9.5
Conservative	Mark Mills	700	46.6	−9.5
Majority		103	6.8	
Turnout		1,503	36.2	−11.1
Labour hold		Swing		

Healey and Whitworth
Party	Candidate	Votes	%	±%
Independent	Ronald Neal	587	57.5	+57.5
Conservative	Valerie Pearson	258	25.3	−29.1
Labour	Bernadette O'Connor	175	17.2	−28.4
Majority		329	32.2	
Turnout		1,020	35.5	+8.8
Independent hold		Swing		

Helmshore
Party	Candidate	Votes	%	±%
Conservative	Brian Essex	897	52.1	+3.2
Labour	Stuart Haines	549	31.9	+3.3
Liberal Democrats	Jim Pilling	275	16.0	−6.6
Majority		348	20.2	−0.1
Turnout		1,721	38.2	−11.9
Conservative hold		Swing		

Irwell
Party	Candidate	Votes	%	±%
Labour	Graham Haworth	432	35.7	−9.7
Conservative	Michael Christie	409	33.8	−20.8
BNP	Kevin Bryan	369	30.5	+30.5
Majority		23	1.9	
Turnout		1,210	33.3	−6.0
Labour gain from Conservative		Swing		

Longholme
Party	Candidate	Votes	%	±%
Labour	June Forshaw	642	42.7	−2.0
Conservative	Nicole Lumb	564	37.5	−17.8
Green	Linda Hemsley	299	19.9	+19.9
Majority		78	5.2	
Turnout		1,505	36.6	+2.7
Labour hold		Swing		

Stacksteads
Party	Candidate	Votes	%	±%
Conservative	Fred Lynskey	452	50.7	
Labour	Denise Hancock	440	49.3	
Majority		12	1.4	
Turnout		892	31.7	
Conservative gain from Labour		Swing		

Whitewell
Party	Candidate	Votes	%	±%
Labour	David Hancock	740	53.4	+8.3
Conservative	Jane Blezard	646	46.6	−8.3
Majority		94	6.8	
Turnout		1,386	32.6	−11.8
Labour hold		Swing		

Worsley
Party	Candidate	Votes	%	±%
Conservative	Hilary Dickinson	564	40.7	−10.1
Labour	Marilyn Procter	478	34.5	−14.7
Liberal Democrats	Robert Sheffield	345	24.9	+24.9
Majority		86	6.2	+4.6
Turnout		1,387	32.9	−7.9
Conservative gain from Labour		Swing		
