= Jim Callaghan (Lancashire politician) =

British politician

Member of Parliament
- In office 28 February 1974 – 8 April 1997
- Preceded by: Alan Haselhurst
- Succeeded by: Jim Dobbin
- Constituency: Middleton and Prestwich (1974–1983); Heywood and Middleton (1983–1997)

Personal details
- Born: James Callaghan; 28 January 1927
- Died: 29 March 2018 (aged 91)
- Party: Labour

James Callaghan (28 January 1927 – 29 March 2018) was a British politician who was a member of parliament between 1974 and 1997.

== Early life ==
Callaghan was educated at Manchester and London universities, and he worked as a lecturer in art at St John's College, Manchester, before entering Parliament.

== Political career ==
At the February 1974 general election, Callaghan was elected as the member of parliament (MP) for Middleton and Prestwich. He served this constituency and its successor, Heywood and Middleton, until he retired in 1997. He was a member of several House of Commons Select Committees – on Transport, on the Cardiff Barrage scheme, and on Education, Science & the Arts.

He served as parliamentary private secretary to Joel Barnett, the Chief Secretary to the Treasury. He was removed from this role in March 1976, after abstaining in a division on spending cuts which the Government lost, forcing a vote of confidence against Prime Minister Harold Wilson. He later also served as PPS to the Sports Minister Denis Howell.

He was a member of the Tribune Group of Labour MPs.

== Death ==
Callaghan died on 29 March 2018 at the age of 91.

Parliament of the United Kingdom
Preceded by Alan Haselhurst	Member of Parliament for Middleton and Prestwich; February 1974–1983	Constituency abolished
New constituency	Member of Parliament for Heywood and Middleton; 1983–1997	Succeeded by Jim Dobbin
