= 2021 Rossendale Borough Council election =

2021 UK local elections

Map showing the results of the 2021 Rossendale Borough Council election

Elections to Rossendale Borough Council were held on 6 May 2021, as part of the wider 2021 UK local elections.

Councillors elected in 2016 were defending their seats this year, and they will be contested again in 2024. The Labour Party lost control of the council, however they continue to run a minority administration.

== Results summary ==
2021 Rossendale Borough Council election
Party	This election			Full council			This election		
Party	Seats	Net	Seats %	Other	Total	Total %	Votes	Votes %	+/−
Labour	8	▼2	61.5	10	18	50.0	8,226	46.2	+2.2
Conservative	4	▲2	30.8	11	15	41.7	8,116	45.6	+1.5
Independent	1	Steady	7.7	2	3	8.3	1,083	6.1	-0.6
Green	0	Steady	0.0	0	0	0.0	377	2.1	+0.8

== Ward results ==
=== Cribden ===
Cribden
Party	Candidate	Votes	%	±%
Labour	Gemma Rooke	618	51.9	+1.5
Conservative	Jonathan Foxcroft	573	48.1	−1.5
Majority		45	3.8	
Turnout		1,202	42.8	
Labour hold		Swing	▲1.5	

=== Eden ===
Eden
Party	Candidate	Votes	%	±%
Labour	Janice Johnson	606	52.5	+17.7
Conservative	Charles Smethurst	549	47.5	−17.7
Majority		57	5.0	
Turnout		1,169	41.5	
Labour hold		Swing	▲17.7	

=== Facit & Shawforth ===
Facit & Shawforth
Party	Candidate	Votes	%	±%
Independent	Janet Whitehead	425	42.9	N/A
Conservative	Scott Smith	310	31.3	−23.8
Labour	Thomas Aldred	255	25.8	−19.1
Majority		115	11.6	
Turnout		1,000	35.8	
Independent gain from Labour		Swing	▲33.4	

=== Goodshaw ===
Goodshaw
Party	Candidate	Votes	%	±%
Conservative	David Foxcroft	658	52.4	+3.8
Labour	Christopher Hamer	598	47.6	−3.8
Majority		60	4.8	
Turnout		1,269	40.5	
Conservative gain from Labour		Swing	▲3.8	

=== Greenfield ===
Greenfield
Party	Candidate	Votes	%	±%
Conservative	Laura-Beth Thompson	789	50.2	−7.7
Labour Co-op	Neil Looker	592	37.7	−4.4
Independent	Valerie Roberts	191	12.2	N/A
Majority		197	12.5	
Turnout		1,597	37.7	
Conservative hold		Swing	▼1.7	

=== Greensclough ===
Greensclough
Party	Candidate	Votes	%	±%
Labour	Barbara Ashworth	794	51.9	+10.4
Conservative	Andrew Snowden	737	48.1	−10.4
Majority		57	3.8	
Turnout		1,565	35.8	
Labour hold		Swing	▲10.4	

=== Hareholme ===
Hareholme
Party	Candidate	Votes	%	±%
Labour	Samara Barnes	833	52.3	−5.0
Conservative	Matthew Littler	759	47.7	+5.0
Majority		74	4.6	
Turnout		1,611	39.1	
Labour hold		Swing	▼5.0	

=== Helmshore ===
Helmshore
Party	Candidate	Votes	%	±%
Conservative	Alan Woods	1,081	51.8	−10.1
Labour	William Townsend	673	32.2	−5.9
Independent	David Stansfield	333	16.0	N/A
Majority		408	19.6	
Turnout		2,101	44.3	
Conservative hold		Swing	▼2.1	

=== Irwell ===
Irwell
Party	Candidate	Votes	%	±%
Labour	Andrew Walmsley	590	49.1	+3.3
Conservative	Caroline Snowden	522	43.5	−10.7
Green	Daniel Brogan	89	7.4	N/A
Majority		68	5.6	
Turnout		1,210	28.4	
Labour hold		Swing	▲7.0	

=== Longholme ===
Longholme
Party	Candidate	Votes	%	±%
Labour	Steven Hughes	740	45.7	−8.2
Conservative	Michael Walters	641	39.5	−6.6
Independent	John Oliver	134	8.3	N/A
Green	Julie White	106	6.5	N/A
Majority		99	6.2	
Turnout		1,634	37.0	
Labour hold		Swing	▼0.8	

=== Stacksteads ===
Stacksteads
Party	Candidate	Votes	%	±%
Labour	Andy MacNae	497	56.8	+24.6
Conservative	Hazel Steen	378	43.2	+29.8
Majority		119	13.6	
Turnout		899	31.5	
Labour hold		Swing	▼2.6	

=== Whitewell ===
Whitewell
Party	Candidate	Votes	%	±%
Conservative	Jennifer Rigby	692	47.3	+13.5
Labour	David Hancock	588	40.2	+5.0
Green	John Payne	182	12.4	−0.6
Majority		104	7.1	
Turnout		1,481	35.6	
Conservative gain from Labour		Swing	▲4.3	

=== Worsley ===
Worsley
Party	Candidate	Votes	%	±%
Labour Co-op	Marilyn Procter	842	66.4	+11.5
Conservative	Mohammed Abdullah	427	33.6	+14.0
Majority		415	32.8	
Turnout		1,292	31.1	
Labour hold		Swing	▼1.3	
