= 2008 Rossendale Borough Council election =

2008 UK local government election

Elections to Rossendale Borough Council were held on 1 May 2008. One third of the council was up for election and the Conservative party gained overall control of the council from no overall control. Overall turnout was up by one per cent from the last election in 2007 at 36.3%.

The Conservative party gained three seats in the election including Worsley, the seat of the former Conservative leader of the council, Duncan Ruddick, who had defected from the party in 2007 to become an independent councillor. The Liberal Democrats gained one seat, while the Labour party lost three seats, with one defeated Labour councillor, Tina Durkin, blaming the Prime Minister Gordon Brown for the losses.

After the election, the composition of the council was

- Conservative 21
- Labour 11
- Liberal Democrat 3
- Independent 1

== Election result ==
Rossendale local election result 2008
Party	Seats	Gains	Losses	Net gain/loss	Seats %	Votes %	Votes	+/−
Conservative	10	3	0	+3	76.9	42.4	7,512	+3.0%
Liberal Democrats	2	1	0	+1	15.4	17.7	3,129	-2.3%
Labour	1	0	3	-3	7.7	30.4	5,385	-4.9%
BNP	0	0	0	0	0	5.6	998	+0.3%
Independent	0	0	1	-1	0	3.8	680	+3.8%

== Ward results ==
Cribden
Party	Candidate	Votes	%	±%
Conservative	Janet Graham	386	35.4	+14.3
Labour	Andrea Fletcher	367	33.6	−8.0
Liberal Democrats	Bob Sheffield	338	31.0	+4.6
Majority		19	1.8	
Turnout		1,091	38.9	+0.0
Conservative hold		Swing		

Eden
Party	Candidate	Votes	%	±%
Conservative	Darryl Smith	916	79.5	+15.2
Labour	John Pilling	236	20.5	−3.7
Majority		680	59.0	+18.9
Turnout		1,152	41.7	+2.4
Conservative hold		Swing		

Facit and Shawforth
Party	Candidate	Votes	%	±%
Conservative	Lynda Barnes	336	29.0	+5.7
Liberal Democrats	Reggie Lane	298	25.7	−10.9
BNP	Michael Crossley	218	18.8	+18.8
Independent	Karen Ruane	185	16.0	+16.0
Labour	Ian Mycock	121	10.4	−29.7
Majority		38	3.3	
Turnout		1,158	41.7	+2.2
Conservative hold		Swing		

Goodshaw
Party	Candidate	Votes	%	±%
Labour	Dorothy Farrington	631	55.3	+2.3
Conservative	Judy Bates	510	44.7	−2.3
Majority		121	10.6	+4.6
Turnout		1,141	36.9	+0.2
Labour hold		Swing		

Greenfield
Party	Candidate	Votes	%	±%
Conservative	Gladys Sandiford	993	60.8	+18.3
Liberal Democrats	Sadaqut Amin	350	21.4	−36.1
Labour	John McManus	290	17.8	+17.8
Majority		643	39.4	
Turnout		1,633	37.4	+0.4
Conservative hold		Swing		

Greensclough
Party	Candidate	Votes	%	±%
Conservative	Judith Driver	697	43.2	+15.4
Labour	Dale Connearn	422	26.1	−1.0
BNP	Peter Salt	273	16.9	−4.9
Liberal Democrats	Michael Carr	223	13.8	−9.5
Majority		275	17.1	+16.4
Turnout		1,615	36.5	−1.6
Conservative hold		Swing		

Hareholme
Party	Candidate	Votes	%	±%
Conservative	Nicola May	775	53.3	
Labour	Amanda Hewlett	679	46.7	
Majority		96	6.6	
Turnout		1454	34.8	−0.2
Conservative gain from Labour		Swing		

Helmshore
Party	Candidate	Votes	%	±%
Conservative	Peter Evans	975	60.1	+4.2
Labour	Emma Harding	320	19.7	−8.5
Liberal Democrats	Cliff Adamson	181	11.2	−4.7
Independent	Noel O'Brien	145	8.9	+8.9
Majority		655	40.4	+12.7
Turnout		1,621	36.0	+2.2
Conservative hold		Swing		

Irwell
Party	Candidate	Votes	%	±%
Conservative	Hazel Steen	529	41.1	+8.9
Labour	Tina Durkin	450	35.0	+3.0
BNP	Kevin Bryan	307	23.9	−2.4
Majority		79	6.1	+5.9
Turnout		1,286	33.3	+1.5
Conservative gain from Labour		Swing		

Longholme
Party	Candidate	Votes	%	±%
Conservative	Jason Gledhill	679	44.9	
Labour	Maurice Jones	484	32.0	
Independent	Leonard Entwistle	350	23.1	
Majority		195	12.9	
Turnout		1513	36.3	+2.2
Conservative hold		Swing		

Whitewell (2)
Party	Candidate	Votes	%	±%
Liberal Democrats	Tim Nuttall	1,006		
Liberal Democrats	Jim Pilling	733		
Labour	Trisha Dearden	433		
Labour	Michael Wilkinson	277		
BNP	Matthew Perry	200		
Turnout		2,649	34.1	+1.4
Liberal Democrats hold		Swing		
Liberal Democrats gain from Labour		Swing		

Worsley
Party	Candidate	Votes	%	±%
Conservative	David Stansfield	716	51.5	+8.2
Labour	Ann Kenyon	675	48.5	+12.3
Majority		41	3.0	−4.1
Turnout		1,391	32.5	−1.7
Conservative gain from Independent		Swing		
