= 2014 Heywood and Middleton by-election =

2014 UK Parliamentary by-election

- 9 October 2014

Heywood and Middleton constituency
- Turnout: 36%
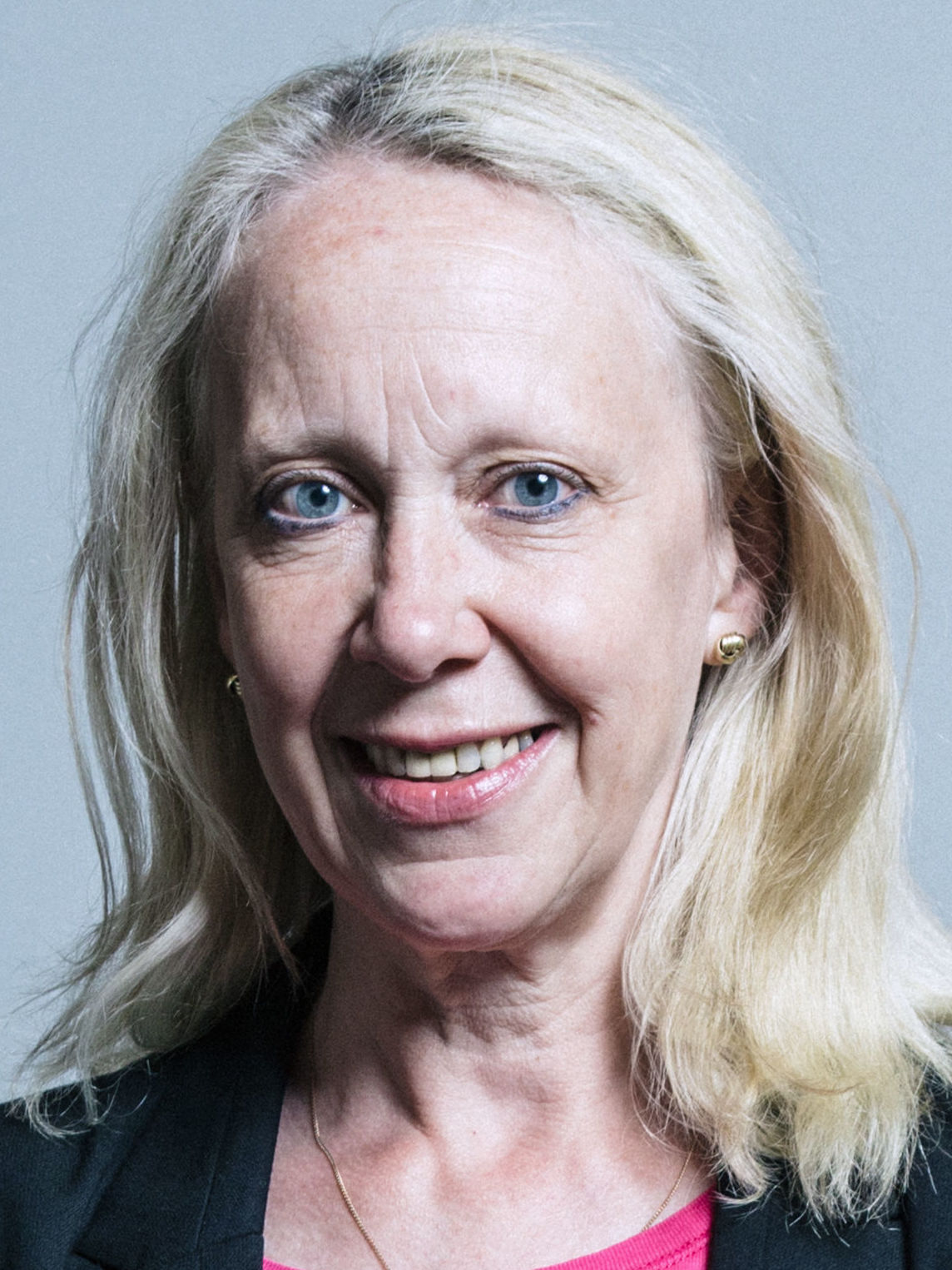

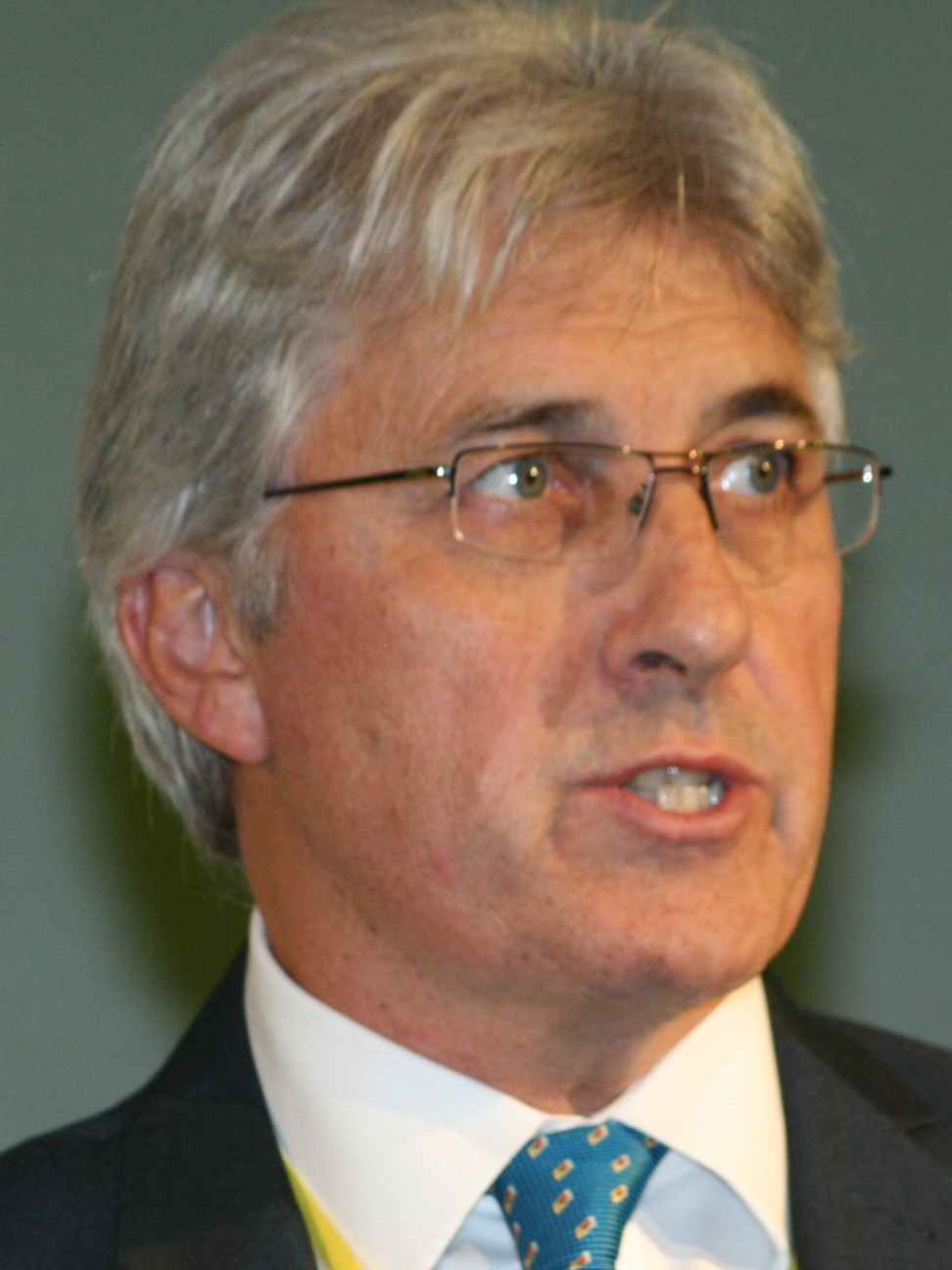
| | First party | Second party |
|---|---|---|
| Candidate | Liz McInnes | John Bickley |
| Party | Labour | UKIP |
| Popular vote | 11,633 | 11,016 |
| Percentage | 40.9% | 38.7% |
| Swing | ▲0.8 pp | ▲36.1 pp |
| | Third party | Fourth party |
| | Con | LD |
| Candidate | Ian Gartside | Anthony Smith |
| Party | Conservative | Liberal Democrats |
| Popular vote | 3,496 | 1,457 |
| Percentage | 12.3% | 5.1% |
| Swing | ▼14.9 pp | ▼17.6 pp |
MP before election
Jim Dobbin
Labour
Subsequent MP
Liz McInnes
Labour

A by-election for the United Kingdom parliamentary constituency of Heywood and Middleton was held on 9 October 2014, triggered by the death of incumbent Labour Party MP Jim Dobbin on 6 September. Labour candidate Liz McInnes narrowly held the seat following a recount; the UK Independence Party (UKIP) came second, and increased its vote by 36 percentage points.

It was held on the same day as the 2014 Clacton by-election.

== Background ==
Labour Party MP Jim Dobbin died on 6 September 2014. The writ to trigger the by-election was moved 10 September, and polling day was set as 9 October. The nominations closed at 4pm on Tuesday 16 September.

== Campaign ==
Labour's decision to call for a by-election before Dobbin's funeral was criticised by Paul Nuttall and Steven Woolfe, UKIP MEPs for North West England, with the former describing it as "shoddy politics". Labour MP for Chesterfield Toby Perkins defended the timing, saying "With the agreement of Jim's family, we have moved the writ today as it is vital that the people of Heywood & Middleton constituency are not left without representation for an extended period".

UKIP candidate John Bickley distributed a leaflet in which he said "Labour's betrayal is no more apparent than with the young white working-class girls of Rotherham and Rochdale where rather than upset immigrant communities, years of abuse were ignored and complaints swept under the carpet". Of this the Labour MP for neighbouring Rochdale, Simon Danczuk, said "It's now clear that UKIP will try and turn grooming and the death of Lee Rigby into a political football. They're playing politics with horrendous crimes that shocked Heywood and Middleton at a time when the wounds of these events are still healing in our town."

During an interview on Daily Politics, after the leaflet was called "divisive" by his Labour opponent Liz McInnes, Bickley criticised McInnes for publishing a leaflet with the heading "WAITING TO DIE" following the death of Jim Dobbin, saying it was landing on the doorsteps of the terminally ill.

== Candidates ==
On 16 September 2014, Rochdale Borough Council published the statement of persons nominated, which confirmed five candidates would contest the by-election.

Labour candidate Liz McInnes is a local councillor on Rossendale Borough Council.

The Liberal Democrats selected Anthony Smith, a local businessman.

The UK Independence Party announced on 11 September that their candidate would be John Bickley, a software businessman who had stood in the Wythenshawe and Sale East by-election in February, in which he had come second.

The Green Party announced their candidate on 14 September as Middleton resident Abi Jackson, a recent graduate of the University of Huddersfield with a master's degree in psychology.

== Polling ==
| Date(s) conducted | Polling organisation/client | Sample size | Lab | Con | LD | UKIP | Green | Others | Lead |
|---|---|---|---|---|---|---|---|---|---|
| 9 Oct 2014 | Heywood and Middleton by-election Result | 28,472 | 40.9% | 12.3% | 5.1% | 38.7% | 3.1% | - | 2.2% |
| 4 Oct | Lord Ashcroft | 1,000 | 47% | 16% | 5% | 28% | 4% | - | 19% |
| 30 Sep | Survation/The Sun | 551 | 50% | 13% | 4% | 31% | 3% | - | 19% |
| 6 May 2010 | General Election Results | 46,125 | 40.1% | 27.2% | 22.7% | 2.6% | - | 7.4% | 12.9% |

== Result ==
2014 Heywood and Middleton by-election
| Party | Candidate | Votes | % | ±% |
|---|---|---|---|---|
| Labour | Liz McInnes | 11,633 | 40.9 | ▲0.8 |
| UKIP | John Bickley | 11,016 | 38.7 | ▲36.1 |
| Conservative | Iain Gartside | 3,496 | 12.3 | ▼14.9 |
| Liberal Democrats | Anthony Smith | 1,457 | 5.1 | ▼17.6 |
| Green | Abi Jackson | 870 | 3.1 | New |
| Majority | | 617 | 2.2 | ▼10.7 |
| Turnout | | 28,472 | 36.0 | ▼21.5 |
| Labour hold | | Swing | | |

Labour retained the seat with a small increase in vote share but a reduced majority. The 36-point increase in UKIP support is one of the largest increases in vote share ever recorded in a by-election. Only in six previous contests in Great Britain has a party enjoyed a larger increase. It is also the highest increase ever recorded for a party that did not win the by-election. Conversely, the fall in the Liberal Democrat vote was the largest recorded for that party in any of the by-elections they have contested since their formation.

== Previous result ==
General election 2010: Heywood and Middleton
| Party | Candidate | Votes | % | ±% |
|---|---|---|---|---|
| Labour Co-op | Jim Dobbin | 18,499 | 40.1 | ▼8.2 |
| Conservative | Mike Holly | 12,528 | 27.2 | ▲5.4 |
| Liberal Democrats | Wera Hobhouse | 10,474 | 22.7 | ▲2.5 |
| BNP | Peter Greenwood | 3,239 | 7.0 | ▲2.6 |
| UKIP | Victoria Cecil | 1,215 | 2.6 | ▲0.7 |
| Independent | Chrissy Lee | 170 | 0.4 | New |
| Majority | | 5,971 | 12.9 | ▼13.6 |
| Turnout | | 46,125 | 57.5 | ▲3.7 |
| Labour Co-op hold | | Swing | ▼6.8 | |

== See also ==
- List of United Kingdom by-elections
- Opinion polling for the 2015 United Kingdom general election
