= 2019 Rossendale Borough Council election =

2019 UK local government election

2019 local election results in Rossendale

Elections to Rossendale Borough Council were held on 2 May 2019, as part of the wider 2019 UK local elections.

Councillors elected in 2015 were defending their seats this year, and they will be contested again in 2023. The Labour Party retained control of the Council.

== State of the Parties ==
After the election, the composition of the council was:

Party	Seats	±
Labour	20	Steady
Conservative	13	▼2
Independent	3	▲2
Source: The Guardian

== Election result ==
Rossendale local election result 2019
Party	Seats	Gains	Losses	Net gain/loss	Seats %	Votes %	Votes	+/−
Conservative	5				41.7	44.1	6,370	
Labour	5				41.7	44.0	6,363	
Independent	2				16.6	6.7	972	
UKIP	0	0	0	0	0.0	3.9	560	
Green	0	0	0	0	0.0	1.3	191	

== Ward results ==
=== Cribden ===
Cribden
Party	Candidate	Votes	%	±%
Labour	Sean Serridge	540	50.4	
Conservative	Jonathan Foxcroft	531	49.6	
Rejected ballots		21	1.9	
Majority		9	0.8	
Turnout		1,092	39.4	
Labour gain from Conservative		Swing		
Source: returning officer.

=== Facit and Shawforth ===
Facit and Shawforth
Party	Candidate	Votes	%	±%
Conservative	Lynda Barnes	425	55.1	
Labour	Rachael Barker	346	44.9	
Rejected ballots		39	4.8	
Majority		79	9.8	
Turnout		810	29.1	
Conservative hold		Swing		
Source: returning officer.

=== Greenfield ===
Greenfield
Party	Candidate	Votes	%	±%
Conservative	Margaret Pendlebury	753	57.9	
Labour	Thomas Leigh	548	42.1	
Rejected ballots		55	4.0	
Majority		205	15.1	
Turnout		1,356	32.3	
Conservative hold		Swing		
Source: returning officer.

=== Greensclough ===
Greensclough
Party	Candidate	Votes	%	±%
Conservative	Peter Steen	730	58.5	
Labour	Gareth Trickett	518	41.5	
Rejected ballots		67	5.1	
Majority		212	16.1	
Turnout		1,315	31.0	
Conservative hold		Swing		
Source: returning officer.

=== Hareholme ===
Hareholme
Party	Candidate	Votes	%	±%
Labour	Michael Marriott	794	57.3	
Conservative	Mohammed Abdullah	591	42.7	
Rejected ballots		40	2.8	
Majority		203	14.2	
Turnout		1,425	34.6	
Labour hold		Swing		
Source: returning officer.

=== Healey and Whitworth ===
Healey and Whitworth
Party	Candidate	Votes	%	±%
Independent	Dayne Powell (Community First)	459	48.9	
Labour	Marilyn Jones	278	29.6	
Conservative	Scott Turner-Smith	202	21.5	
Rejected ballots		11	1.1	
Majority		181	19.1	
Turnout		950	32.0	
Independent gain from Labour		Swing		
Source: returning officer.

=== Helmshore ===
Helmshore
Party	Candidate	Votes	%	±%
Conservative	Tony Haworth	1,115	61.9	
Labour	Mervyn Kay	687	38.1	
Rejected ballots		50	2.7	
Majority		428	23.1	
Turnout		1,852	39.3	
Conservative hold		Swing		
Source: returning officer.

=== Irwell ===
Irwell
Party	Candidate	Votes	%	±%
Conservative	Janet Eaton	541	54.2	
Labour	Michelle Smith	457	45.8	
Rejected ballots		64	6.0	
Majority		84	7.9	
Turnout		1,062	25.5	
Conservative hold		Swing		
Source: returning officer.

=== Longholme ===
Longholme
Party	Candidate	Votes	%	±%
Labour	Susan Brennan	742	53.9	
Conservative	Nicola May	634	46.1	
Rejected ballots		35	2.5	
Majority		108	7.6	
Turnout		1,411	32.5	
Labour hold		Swing		
Source: returning officer.

=== Stacksteads ===
Stacksteads
Party	Candidate	Votes	%	±%
Independent	Terence Haslam-Jones	513	54.4	
Labour	Ross Charnock	304	32.2	
Conservative	Fouad Khattab	126	13.4	
Rejected ballots		6	0.6	
Majority		209	22.1	
Turnout		949	33.8	
Independent gain from Labour		Swing		
Source: returning officer.

=== Whitewell ===
Whitewell
Party	Candidate	Votes	%	±%
Labour	Julie Adshead	518	35.2	
Conservative	Jennifer Rigby	497	33.8	
UKIP	Glenn Jones	266	18.1	
Green	John Payne	191	13.0	
Rejected ballots		11	0.7	
Majority		21	1.4	
Turnout		1,483	35.5	
Labour gain from Conservative		Swing		
Source: returning officer.

=== Worsley ===
Worsley
Party	Candidate	Votes	%	±%
Labour	Adrian Lythgoe	631	54.9	
UKIP	Granville Barker	294	25.6	
Conservative	Mark Mills	225	19.6	
Rejected ballots		16	1.4	
Majority		337	28.9	
Turnout		1,166	28.7	
Labour hold		Swing		
Source: returning officer.

== Changes 2019–2021 ==
- 2021: Cllr Janet Eaton (Irwell) and her husband Cllr Jimmy Eaton (Greensclough, elected 2018) both left the Conservative Party to sit as Independents, after Jimmy Eaton was expelled from the party for standing against its official candidate in the Rossendale East division at the Lancashire County Council election.
