= Liz McInnes =

British Labour politician

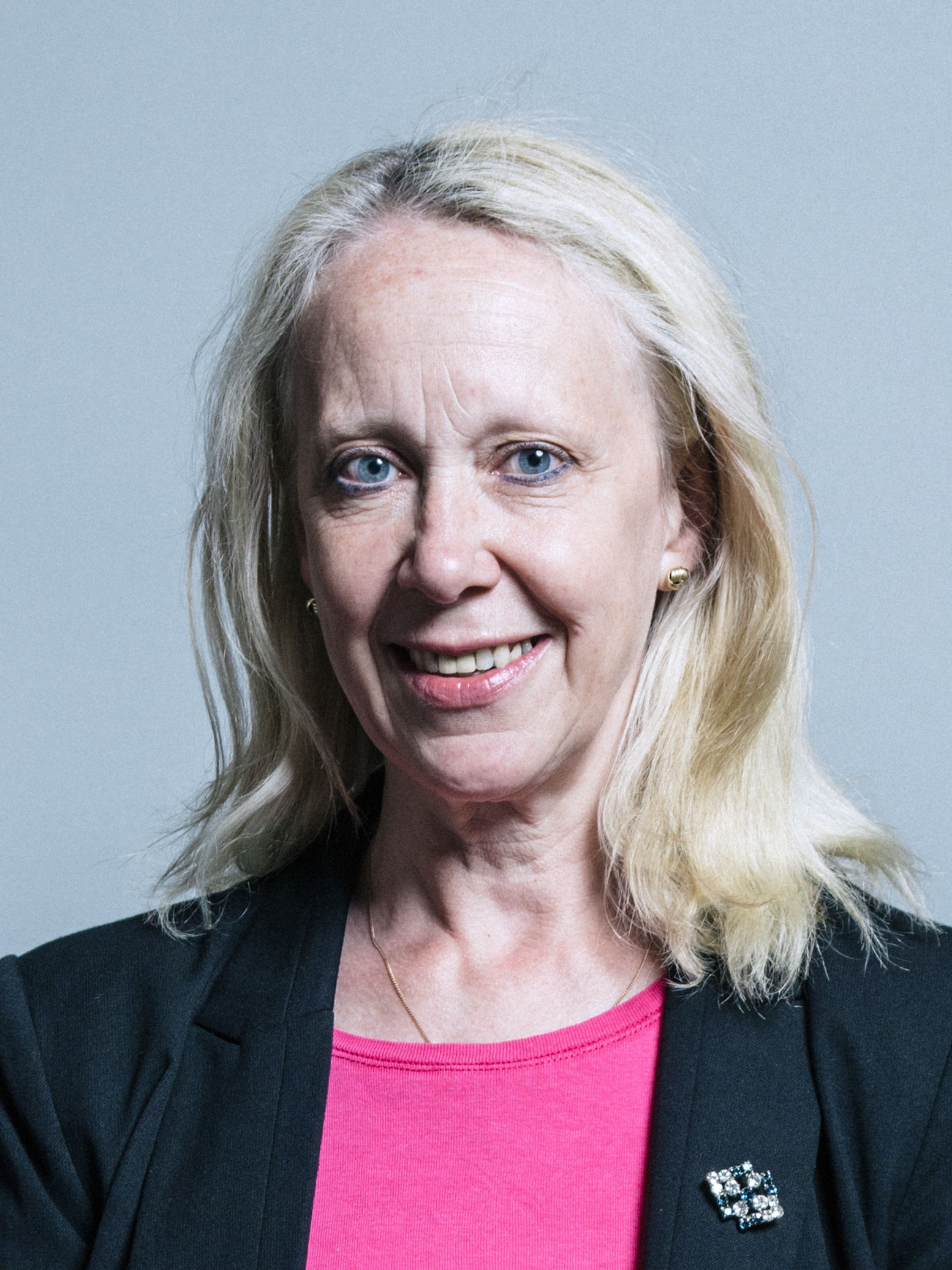
- Official portrait, 2017

Member of Parliament for Heywood and Middleton
- In office 9 October 2014 – 6 November 2019
- Preceded by: Jim Dobbin
- Succeeded by: Chris Clarkson

Member of Rossendale Council for Longholme
- Incumbent
- Assumed office 5 May 2022
- Preceded by: Joseph Stevens
- In office 6 May 2010 – October 2014
- Preceded by: June Forshaw
- Succeeded by: Annie McMahon

Personal details
- Born: 30 March 1959 (age 67) Oldham, Lancashire, England
- Party: Labour
- Children: 1
- Education: St Anne's College, Oxford (BA); University of Surrey (MA)
- Occupation: Politician; biochemist

Elizabeth Anne McInnes (born 30 March 1959) is a British Labour Party politician and biochemist who served as Member of Parliament (MP) for Heywood and Middleton from 2014 to 2019. In May 2026 she was elected as the ceremonial mayor of Rossendale.

== Early life and career ==
Elizabeth Anne McInnes was born on 30 March 1959 in Oldham, Lancashire. She was the fifth of the eight children to Margaret Elizabeth and George Frederick McInnes. Her father was a sheet metal worker who died when she was 14 years-old, so her mother brought-up the family single-handedly. Margaret took on various jobs including running public houses.

McInnes was educated at Hathershaw Comprehensive School, Oldham. She studied biochemistry at St Anne's College, University of Oxford and completed a master's degree at the University of Surrey. From 1981, she worked in healthcare for the NHS in London, Sheffield, Manchester and Oldham.

Prior to her election to Parliament, McInnes was a senior biochemist at the Pennine Acute Hospitals NHS Trust. She served as secretary of the Pennine Acute branch for Unite the Union, chair of the National Health Sector Industrial Committee and a member of the Healthcare Science organising professional committee.

She was elected as a Member of Rossendale Borough Council for Longholme in 2010, where she was health lead and Chair of Overview and Scrutiny Committee. McInnes stood down from the Council after her election to parliament, but was re-elected to Longholme in the 2022 local elections. In May 2026 McInnes was appointed as the Mayor of Rossendale.

== Parliamentary career ==
McInnes was elected to Parliament at the October 2014 Heywood and Middleton by-election, narrowly defeating UKIP candidate John Bickley with a majority of 617 votes. Caused by the death of the incumbent Labour MP Jim Dobbin, she beat several candidates to win the Labour selection, including former BBC presenter Miriam O'Reilly.

She was re-elected in 2015 and 2017, but defeated at the 2019 general election by Conservative Chris Clarkson.

She supported Andy Burnham in the 2015 Labour leadership election, and was appointed Shadow Minister for Communities and Local Government after Jeremy Corbyn's victory. In June 2016, McInnes supported Corbyn in a vote of no confidence within the Parliamentary Labour Party. However, she resigned from the front bench following his overwhelming defeat, arguing the outcome of the vote left her with no other option. She supported Owen Smith in the unsuccessful attempt to replace him in the 2016 leadership election.

McInnes was re-appointed to the opposition front bench in October 2016, as Shadow Minister for Foreign and Commonwealth Affairs responsible for Africa and Asia.

== Political views and campaigns ==
McInnes was awarded Parliamentarian of the Year in 2016 by the charity Brake, for her campaigning to obtain tougher sentences for those causing death and injury by dangerous driving.

In 2019, she argued with ex-Labour MP Ian Austin in the House of Commons chamber whilst he criticised Jeremy Corbyn. She told Austin, "Why don't you go over there? You're not welcome here," directing him to sit alongside Conservative MPs on the government benches. He was later appointed to the House of Lords by the Conservative Prime Minister, Boris Johnson.

Parliament of the United Kingdom
Preceded by Jim Dobbin	Member of Parliament for Heywood and Middleton; 2014–2019	Succeeded by Chris Clarkson
