= 2016 Rossendale Borough Council election =

2016 UK local government election

The 2016 Rossendale Borough Council election took place on 5 May 2016 to elect members to one third of Rossendale Borough Council in England. Councillors elected in 2012 were defending their seats this year, and they will be contested again in 2020. The Labour Party retained control of the council.

Prior to the election The Labour Party held 19 seats, The Conservatives held 15 and there were 3 Independents. The result was a Labour victory with 3 seats gained 2 from the Conservatives and 1 from Independent. UKIP, The Green Party and National Front along with several Independents also fielded candidates. This was on the same day as other local elections. The Conservative Party required a net gain of three seats to take control of the council. The resulting Labour victory was a surprise. The most surprising was Labour's taking of the seemingly safe Conservative ward of Eden.

== State of the Parties ==
After the election, the composition of the council was:

Party	Seats	±
Labour	22	▲3
Conservative	13	▼2
Independent	1	▼1

== Election result ==
Rossendale local election result 2016
Party	Seats	Gains	Losses	Net gain/loss	Seats %	Votes %	Votes	+/−
Labour	10							
Conservative	2							
UKIP	0							
Green	0							
Independent	0							
National Front	0							

== Ward results ==
=== Cribden ===
Cribden
Party	Candidate	Votes	%	±%
Labour	Andrea Fletcher	542		
UKIP	Michael Pickup	152		
Conservative	Jenny Rigby	391		
Green	Hilary Jane Whitehead	71		
Rejected ballots		6		
Majority		151		
Turnout		1,162	41.6	
Labour hold		Swing		
Source returning officer.

=== Eden ===
Incumbent Darryl Smith (Conservative) Not Standing

Eden
Party	Candidate	Votes	%	±%
Labour	Janice Johnson	549		
Conservative	Mischa Charlton-Mockett	492		
Rejected ballots		39		
Majority		57		
Turnout		1,056	36.3	
Labour gain from Conservative		Swing		
Source returning officer.

=== Facit and Shawforth ===
Incumbent Mandalene De Souza (Independent) Not Standing

Facit and Shawforth
Party	Candidate	Votes	%	±%
Labour	Tom Aldred	381		
UKIP	Max Lake	200		
Conservative	Dayne Powell	304		
Rejected ballots		0		
Majority		77		
Turnout		885	31.8	
Labour gain from Independent		Swing		
Source returning officer.

=== Goodshaw ===
Goodshaw
Party	Candidate	Votes	%	±%
UKIP	Ronald Ashworth	122		
Labour	Dorothy Farrington	709		
Conservative	Lynn Tattersall	378		
Rejected ballots		3		
Majority		331		
Turnout		1,212	38.6	
Labour hold		Swing		
Source returning officer.

=== Greenfield ===
Greenfield
Party	Candidate	Votes	%	±%
Labour	Lisa Bloor	584		
Conservative	Val Roberts	693		
UKIP	Alan Weaver	212		
Rejected ballots		7		
Majority		99		
Turnout		1,496	34.2	
Conservative hold		Swing		
Source returning officer.

=== Greensclough ===
Greensclough
Party	Candidate	Votes	%	±%
Labour	Barbara Ashworth	839		
Conservative	Mark Mills	630		
Rejected ballots		19		
Majority		209		
Turnout		1,488	34.1	
Labour hold		Swing		
Source returning officer.

=== Hareholme ===
Hareholme
Party	Candidate	Votes	%	±%
Independent	Clive Balchin	547		
Conservative	David Foxcroft	477		
Labour	Andy MacNae	615		
Rejected ballots		4		
Majority		68		
Turnout		1,643	40.0	
Labour hold		Swing		
Source returning officer.

=== Helmshore ===
Incumbent Peter Smith (Conservative) Not Standing

Helmshore
Party	Candidate	Votes	%	±%
Independent	Noel O'Brien	236		
Conservative	David Stansfield	1,003		
Labour	Sam Stuart-Booth	700		
Rejected ballots		17		
Majority		303		
Turnout		1,956	40.5	
Conservative hold		Swing		
Source returning officer.

=== Irwell ===
Irwell
Party	Candidate	Votes	%	±%
National Front	Kevin Bryan	128		
Conservative	Laura-Beth Thompson	462		
Labour	Andrew Walmsley	661		
Rejected ballots		11		
Majority		199		
Turnout		1,262	30.6	
Labour hold		Swing		
Source returning officer.

=== Longholme ===
Longholme
Party	Candidate	Votes	%	±%
UKIP	Gary Barnes	262		
Conservative	Thomas Blackburn	500		
Labour	Steve Hughes	768		
Rejected ballots		10		
Majority		268		
Turnout		1,540	40.5	
Labour hold		Swing		
Source returning officer.

=== Whitewell ===
Whitewell
Party	Candidate	Votes	%	±%
Labour	Pam Bromley	651		
Conservative	Sarah Collinge	607		
Green	John Payne	137		
Rejected ballots		11		
Majority		44		
Turnout		1,406	33.7	
Labour gain from Conservative		Swing		
Source returning officer.

=== Worsley ===
Worsley
Party	Candidate	Votes	%	±%
Conservative	Naomi Adams	418		
UKIP	Granville Barker	265		
Labour	Marilyn Procter	733		
Rejected ballots		7		
Majority		315		
Turnout		1,423	33.8	
Labour hold		Swing		
Source returning officer.
