= 2022 Rossendale Borough Council election =

2022 UK local government election

Results by ward

Elections to Rossendale Borough Council were held on 5 May 2022, as part of the wider 2022 UK local elections.

== Results summary ==
2022 Rossendale Borough Council election
Party	This election			Full council			This election		
Party	Seats	Net	Seats %	Other	Total	Total %	Votes	Votes %	+/−
Labour	7	▲2	62.6	13	20	55.6	6,603	40.7	-6.0
Conservative	3	▼3	18.2	10	12	33.3	6,021	37.1	-11.8
Independent	1	▲1	9.1	2	3	8.3	1,002	6.2	+4.8
Community First	1	Steady	9.1	0	1	2.8	611	3.8	+1.0
Green	0	Steady	0.0	0	0	0.0	1,986	12.2	New

== Ward results ==
=== Eden ===
Eden
Party	Candidate	Votes	%	±%
Conservative	Anne Cheetham	577	51.1	+3.6
Labour	David Hancock	419	37.1	−15.4
Green	Gill Hewitt	134	11.9	N/A
Majority		158	14.0	
Turnout		1,134	41.3	
Conservative hold		Swing	▲9.5	

=== Goodshaw ===
Goodshaw
Party	Candidate	Votes	%	±%
Labour	Alyson Barnes	682	55.1	+7.5
Conservative	Jonathan Foxcroft	459	37.1	−15.3
Green	Ingrid Falat	96	7.8	N/A
Majority		223	18.0	
Turnout		1,243	40.9	
Labour hold		Swing	▲11.4	

=== Greenfield ===
Greenfield
Party	Candidate	Votes	%	±%
Conservative	Granville Morris	751	49.3	−0.9
Labour Co-op	Neil Looker	609	40.0	+2.3
Green	Geoff Blow	120	7.9	N/A
Independent	Val Roberts	44	2.9	−9.3
Majority		142	9.3	
Turnout		1,532	36.3	
Conservative hold		Swing	▼1.6	

=== Greensclough ===
Greensclough
Party	Candidate	Votes	%	±%
Independent	Jimmy Eaton	809	54.1	N/A
Green	Alexander Vijatov	408	27.3	N/A
Conservative	Stuart Haughan	278	18.6	−29.5
Majority		401	26.8	
Turnout		1,500	34.7	
Independent gain from Conservative		Swing	N/A	

=== Hareholme ===
Hareholme
Party	Candidate	Votes	%	±%
Labour	Annie McMahon	793	53.7	+1.4
Conservative	Matthew Littler	527	35.7	−12.0
Green	Paul Chynoweth	158	10.7	N/A
Majority		266	18.0	
Turnout		1,487	37.0	
Labour hold		Swing	▲6.7	

=== Healey & Whitworth ===
Healey & Whitworth
Party	Candidate	Votes	%	±%
Community First	Alan Neal	611	71.5	+22.6
Conservative	Michael Whitworth	243	28.5	+7.0
Majority		368	43.0	
Turnout		865	29.2	
Community First hold		Swing	▲7.8	

=== Helmshore ===
Helmshore
Party	Candidate	Votes	%	±%
Conservative	Caroline Snowden	892	46.4	−5.4
Labour	William Townsend	701	36.5	+4.3
Green	Katrina Brockbank	219	11.4	N/A
Independent	David Stansfield	101	5.3	−10.7
Majority		191	9.9	−9.7
Turnout		1,922	41.47	−2.83
Conservative hold		Swing	▼4.85	

=== Irwell ===
Irwell
Party	Candidate	Votes	%	±%
Labour	Michelle Smith	567	44.9	−4.2
Conservative	Scott Smith	561	44.4	+0.9
Green	Daniel Brogan	136	10.8	+3.4
Majority		6	0.5	
Turnout		1,277	30.2	
Labour gain from Conservative		Swing	▼2.6	

=== Longholme ===
Longholme
Party	Candidate	Votes	%	±%
Labour Co-op	Liz McInnes	891	53.8	+8.1
Conservative	Bob Smethurst	613	37.0	−2.5
Green	Chich Hewitt	151	9.1	+2.6
Majority		278	16.8	
Turnout		1,660	37.8	
Labour hold		Swing	▲5.3	

=== Stacksteads ===
Stacksteads
Party	Candidate	Votes	%	±%
Labour	Jackie Oakes	575	64.9	+8.1
Conservative	David Watson	229	25.8	−17.4
Green	Clare Pickup	82	9.3	N/A
Majority		346	39.1	
Turnout		892	31.4	
Labour hold		Swing	▲12.8	

=== Whitewell ===
Whitewell
Party	Candidate	Votes	%	±%
Labour	Mary Coogan	682	42.3	+2.1
Conservative	Karl Kempson	558	34.6	−12.7
Green	John Payne	324	20.1	+7.7
Independent	Gareth Trickett	48	3.0	N/A
Majority		124	7.7	
Turnout		1,622	39.7	
Labour gain from Conservative		Swing	▲7.4	

=== Worsley ===
Worsley
Party	Candidate	Votes	%	±%
Labour	Ann Kenyon	684	58.2	−8.2
Conservative	Deborah Lord	333	28.3	−5.3
Green	Richard Lord-Navin	158	13.4	N/A
Majority		351	29.9	
Turnout		1,183	28.6	
Labour hold		Swing	▼1.5	

== Changes 2022–2023 ==
=== By-elections ===
==== Facit & Shawforth ====
Facit & Shawforth: 29 September 2022
Party	Candidate	Votes	%	±%
Conservative	Scott Smith	337	43.5	N/A
Independent	Kim Olaolu	214	27.6	N/A
Labour	Caitlin Chippendale	203	26.2	N/A
Green	Alexander Vijatov	20	2.6	N/A
Majority		123	15.9	
Turnout		776	27.9	
Conservative hold		Swing		

Councillor Lynda Barnes resigned on health grounds.

==== Helmshore ====
Helmshore: 29 September 2022
Party	Candidate	Votes	%	±%
Conservative	Ann Hodgkiss	736	50.6	N/A
Labour Co-op	Neil Looker	540	37.1	N/A
Green	Katrina Brockbank	74	5.1	N/A
Liberal Democrats	Steven Nelson	62	4.3	N/A
Independent	David Stansfield	42	2.9	N/A
Majority		196	13.5	
Turnout		1,456	31.8	
Conservative hold		Swing		

Councillor Tony Haworth resigned on health grounds.
