= 2007 Rossendale Borough Council election =

2007 UK local government election

Elections to Rossendale Borough Council were held on 3 May 2007. One third of the council was up for election and the Conservative party stayed in overall control of the council.

After the election, the composition of the council was:

- Conservative 22
- Labour 12
- Liberal Democrat 1
- Independent 1

== Election result ==
Rossendale local election result 2007
Party	Seats	Gains	Losses	Net gain/loss	Seats %	Votes %	Votes	+/−
Conservative	7	1	3	-2	46.7	39.4	7,588	-7.7%
Labour	7	2	0	+2	46.7	35.3	6,806	+0.1%
Liberal Democrats	1	1	0	+1	6.7	20.0	3,856	+9.8%
BNP	0	0	0	0	0	5.3	1,024	+3.1%
Independent	0	0	1	-1	0	0	0	-3.5%

== Ward results ==
Cribden
Party	Candidate	Votes	%	±%
Labour	Christine Gill	456	41.6	−4.6
Liberal Democrats	Robert Sheffield	290	26.4	+26.4
Conservative	Judy Bates	231	21.1	−32.7
BNP	Rita O'Brien	120	10.9	+10.9
Majority		166	15.2	
Turnout		1,097	38.9	−9.2
Labour hold		Swing		

Eden
Party	Candidate	Votes	%	±%
Conservative	Anne Cheetham	708	64.3	
Labour	Margaret Stanley	266	24.2	
Liberal Democrats	Jim Pilling	127	11.5	
Majority		442	40.1	
Turnout		1,101	39.3	−1.0
Conservative hold		Swing		

Facit and Shawforth
Party	Candidate	Votes	%	±%
Labour	Tom Aldred	431	40.1	−4.6
Liberal Democrats	Reginald Lane	393	36.6	+36.6
Conservative	Hazel Steen	251	23.3	−32.0
Majority		38	3.5	
Turnout		1,075	39.5	−6.4
Labour gain from Conservative		Swing		

Greenfield
Party	Candidate	Votes	%	±%
Liberal Democrats	Catherine Pilling	919	57.5	+19.7
Conservative	Peter Starkey	680	42.5	−1.9
Majority		239	15.0	
Turnout		1,599	37.0	+0.7
Liberal Democrats gain from Conservative		Swing		

Greensclough
Party	Candidate	Votes	%	±%
Conservative	Bill Challinor	469	27.8	−21.8
Labour	Bernadette O'Connor	457	27.1	+5.7
Liberal Democrats	Michael Carr	394	23.3	−5.7
BNP	Peter Salt	369	21.8	+21.8
Majority		12	0.7	−19.9
Turnout		1,689	38.1	−2.5
Conservative hold		Swing		

Hareholme (2)
Party	Candidate	Votes	%	±%
Labour	Trevor Unsworth	713		
Labour	Amanda Hewlett	693		
Conservative	Mark Mills	626		
Conservative	Michael Christie	560		
Liberal Democrats	Benjamin Dixon	206		
Turnout		2,798	35.0	−1.2
Labour hold		Swing		
Labour hold		Swing		

Healey and Whitworth
Party	Candidate	Votes	%	±%
Labour	Roger Wilson	344	35.1	+17.9
Conservative	David Barnes	318	32.4	+7.1
BNP	Michael Crossley	220	22.4	+22.4
Liberal Democrats	Joanne Karoo	98	10.0	+10.0
Majority		26	2.7	
Turnout		980	33.8	−1.7
Labour gain from Conservative		Swing		

Helmshore
Party	Candidate	Votes	%	±%
Conservative	Barry Pawson	859	55.9	+3.8
Labour	Marilyn Procter	434	28.2	−3.7
Liberal Democrats	Marc Karoo	244	15.9	−0.1
Majority		425	27.7	+7.5
Turnout		1,537	33.8	−4.4
Conservative hold		Swing		

Irwell
Party	Candidate	Votes	%	±%
Conservative	Peter Steen	386	32.2	−1.6
Labour	Tina Durkin	384	32.0	−3.7
BNP	Kevin Bryan	315	26.3	−4.2
Liberal Democrats	Cliff Adamson	115	9.6	+9.6
Majority		2	0.2	
Turnout		1,200	31.8	−1.5
Conservative hold		Swing		

Longholme (2)
Party	Candidate	Votes	%	±%
Conservative	Anthony Swain	663		
Conservative	Alison Tickner	586		
Labour	Denise Hancock	554		
Labour	John Pilling	528		
Liberal Democrats	Farzana Quraishi	147		
Turnout		2,478	34.1	−2.5
Conservative hold		Swing		
Conservative gain from Independent		Swing		

Stacksteads
Party	Candidate	Votes	%	±%
Labour	Christine Lamb	485	57.3	+8.0
Conservative	Susan Popland	254	30.0	−20.7
Liberal Democrats	Sue Workman	107	12.6	+12.6
Majority		231	27.3	
Turnout		846	30.6	−1.1
Labour hold		Swing		

Whitewell
Party	Candidate	Votes	%	±%
Labour	Amanda Robertson	529	37.7	−15.7
Liberal Democrats	Tim Nuttall	515	36.7	+36.7
Conservative	Barbara Marriott	361	25.7	−20.9
Majority		14	1.0	−5.8
Turnout		1,405	32.7	+0.1
Labour hold		Swing		

Worsley
Party	Candidate	Votes	%	±%
Conservative	Joyce Thorne	636	43.3	+2.6
Labour	Ann Kenyon	532	36.2	+1.7
Liberal Democrats	Sadaqut Amin	301	20.5	−4.4
Majority		104	7.1	+0.9
Turnout		1,469	34.2	+1.3
Conservative hold		Swing		
