= 2011 Rossendale Borough Council election =

2011 UK local government election

The 2011 Rossendale Borough Council election was held on 5 May 2011 to elect members of Rossendale Borough Council in Lancashire, England. One third of the council was up for election and the Conservative Party were in overall control of the council at the time of the election.

The composition of the council was:

- Conservative 19
- Labour 13
- Liberal Democrat 3
- Community First Party 1

== Ward results ==
Cribden
Party	Candidate	Votes	%	±%
Conservative	Mischa Charlton-Mockett			
Labour	Christine Gill*			
Majority				
Turnout				

Facit & Shawforth
Party	Candidate	Votes	%	±%
Labour	Tom Aldred*			
Conservative	David Barnes			
Green	Thomas Jackson			
Majority				
Turnout				

Greenfield
Party	Candidate	Votes	%	±%
Labour	Marilyn Procter			
Conservative	Annabel Shipley			
Majority				
Turnout				

Greensclough
Party	Candidate	Votes	%	±%
Conservative	Bill Challinor*			
Labour	Andy MacNae			
Majority				
Turnout				

Hareholme
Party	Candidate	Votes	%	±%
Labour	Patrick Marriott			
Conservative	Michael Pickup			
Majority				
Turnout				

Healey and Whitworth
Party	Candidate	Votes	%	±%
Community First	Dave Bradbury			
Labour	Sean Serridge*			
Majority				
Turnout				

Helmshore
Party	Candidate	Votes	%	±%
Labour	John McManus			
Conservative	Amanda Milling*			
Majority				
Turnout				

Irwell
Party	Candidate	Votes	%	±%
Labour	Michelle Smith	620		
Conservative	Peter Steen	533		
National Front	Kevin Bryan	170		
Majority		87		
Turnout		1,323	33.0	

Longholme
Party	Candidate	Votes	%	±%
Labour	Peter Roberts			
Conservative	Tony Swain*			
Majority				
Turnout				

Stacksteads
Party	Candidate	Votes	%	±%
Labour	Christine Lamb	605		
Conservative	Stephen Pickup	221		
English Democrat	Tony Justice	144		
Majority		384		
Turnout		970	34.2	

Whitewell
Party	Candidate	Votes	%	±%
Labour	Amanda Robertson*	uncontested		
Labour hold		Swing		

Worsley
Party	Candidate	Votes	%	±%
Conservative	Joyce Thorne*			
Labour	Bob Wilkinson			
Majority				
Turnout				
