= 2010 Rossendale Borough Council election =

2010 UK local government election

The 2010 Rossendale Borough Council election took place on 6 May 2010 to elect members of Rossendale Borough Council in Lancashire, England. One third of the council was up for election and the Conservative Party stayed in overall control of the council.

After the election, the composition of the council was:

- Conservative 20
- Labour 12
- Liberal Democrat 3
- Community First Party 1

== Background ==
Before the election the Conservatives ran the council with 21 seats compared to 11 for Labour, 3 for the Liberal Democrats and 1 for the Community First Party. 12 seats were being contested and the Conservatives were strongly favoured to remain in control of the council.

Candidates stood in the election from the Conservatives, Labour, Liberal Democrats, Community First, English Democrats, Greens and the National Front. Before the election the key wards in the election were expected to be Goodshaw and Stacksteads.

== Election result ==
The results saw the Conservatives maintain a majority on the council with 20 seats despite suffering a net loss of 1 seat to Labour. Labour gained Stacksteads and Worsley from the Conservatives, but lost Irwell back to the Conservatives. Labour also came up only 19 votes short of gaining Healey and Whitworth from the Community First councillor Alan Neal. Overall turnout was high at 76.04% due to the election taking place at the same time as the 2010 general election.

Rossendale local election result 2010
Party	Seats	Gains	Losses	Net gain/loss	Seats %	Votes %	Votes	+/−
Conservative	5	1	2	-1	41.7	43.2	12,736	+0.8%
Labour	5	2	1	+1	41.7	37.9	11,189	+7.5%
Liberal Democrats	1	0	0	0	8.3	13.8	4,084	-3.9%
Community First	1	0	0	0	8.3	2.0	583	+2.0%
English Democrat	0	0	0	0	0	1.6	462	+1.6%
National Front	0	0	0	0	0	0.9	265	+0.9%
Green	0	0	0	0	0	0.7	195	+0.7%

== Ward results ==
Eden
Party	Candidate	Votes	%	±%
Conservative	Anne Cheetham	1,083	54.1	−25.4
Liberal Democrats	Simon Holland	465	23.2	+23.2
Labour	Nick Pilling	453	22.6	+2.1
Majority		618	30.9	−28.1
Turnout		2,001		
Conservative hold		Swing		

Goodshaw
Party	Candidate	Votes	%	±%
Labour	Alyson Barnes	950	42.5	−12.8
Conservative	Sandra McWicker	825	36.9	−7.8
English Democrat	Tony Justice	462	20.7	+20.7
Majority		125	5.6	−5.0
Turnout		2,237		
Labour hold		Swing		

Greenfield
Party	Candidate	Votes	%	±%
Conservative	Granville Morris	1,476	50.0	−10.8
Labour	Marilyn Procter	819	27.7	+9.9
Liberal Democrats	Sadaqut Amin	658	22.3	+0.9
Majority		657	22.2	−17.2
Turnout		2,953		
Conservative hold		Swing		

Greensclough
Party	Candidate	Votes	%	±%
Conservative	Jimmy Eaton	1,428	50.8	+7.6
Liberal Democrats	Bill Jackson	709	25.2	+11.4
Labour	Amanda Hewlett	675	24.0	−2.1
Majority		719	25.6	+8.5
Turnout		2,812		
Conservative hold		Swing		

Hareholme
Party	Candidate	Votes	%	±%
Labour	Colin Crawforth	1,401	52.4	+5.7
Conservative	Michael Pickup	1,274	47.6	−5.7
Majority		127	4.8	
Turnout		2,675		
Labour hold		Swing		

Healey and Whitworth
Party	Candidate	Votes	%	±%
Community First	Alan Neal	583	33.9	+33.9
Labour	Sean Serridge	564	32.8	−2.3
Conservative	David Barnes	381	22.2	−10.2
Liberal Democrats	Colin Cunningham	192	11.2	+1.2
Majority		19	1.1	
Turnout		1,720		
Independent hold		Swing		

Helmshore
Party	Candidate	Votes	%	±%
Conservative	Brian Essex	1,969	61.9	+1.8
Labour	Emma Harding	1,212	38.1	+18.4
Majority		757	23.8	−16.6
Turnout		3,181		
Conservative hold		Swing		

Irwell
Party	Candidate	Votes	%	±%
Conservative	Michael Christie	984	43.1	+2.0
Labour	Graham Haworth	837	36.7	+1.7
National Front	Kevin Bryant	265	11.6	+11.6
Green	Helen Jackson	195	8.5	+8.5
Majority		147	6.4	+0.3
Turnout		2,281		
Conservative gain from Labour		Swing		

Longholme
Party	Candidate	Votes	%	±%
Labour	Liz McInnes	991	36.2	+4.2
Liberal Democrats	Bob Sheffield	965	35.2	+35.2
Conservative	Mohammed Abdullah	785	28.6	−16.3
Majority		26	1.0	
Turnout		2,741		
Labour hold		Swing		

Stacksteads
Party	Candidate	Votes	%	±%
Labour	Jackie Oakes	1,039	64.5	+7.2
Conservative	Fred Lynskey	573	35.5	+5.5
Majority		466	28.9	+1.6
Turnout		1,612		
Labour gain from Conservative		Swing		

Whitewell
Party	Candidate	Votes	%	±%
Liberal Democrats	Jim Pilling	1,095	39.8	
Conservative	Barbara Marriott	833	30.2	
Labour	Jean Hayler	826	30.0	
Majority		262	9.6	
Turnout		2,754		
Liberal Democrats hold		Swing		

Worsley
Party	Candidate	Votes	%	±%
Labour	Ann Kenyon	1,422	55.8	+7.3
Conservative	Mark Thomson	1,125	44.2	−7.3
Majority		297	11.6	
Turnout		2,547		
Labour gain from Conservative		Swing		
