= 2023 Rossendale Borough Council election =

2023 English local election

- 4 May 2023

12 out of 36 seats to Rossendale Borough Council 19 seats needed for a majority

	First party	Second party	Third party
Leader	Alyson Barnes	David Foxcroft
Party	Labour	Conservative	Community First
Last election	19 seats, 41.4%	12 seats, 35.8%	2 seats, 4.3%
Seats won	8	2	1
Seats after	22	9	2
Seat change	▲3	▼3	Steady
Popular vote	6,470	4,957	783
Percentage	44.5%	34.1%	5.4%
Swing	▲3.3%	▼1.7%	▲1.1%
	Fourth party	Fifth party
Party	Independent	Green
Last election	3 seats, 6.3%	0 seats, 12.3%
Seats won	0	1
Seats after	2	1
Seat change	▼1	▲1
Popular vote	169	2,090
Percentage	1.2%	14.4%
Swing	▼5.1%	▲2.1%
- Winner of each seat at the 2023 Rossendale Borough Council election
Leader before election
Alyson Barnes
Labour
Leader after election
Alyson Barnes
Labour

The 2023 Rossendale Borough Council election took place on 4 May 2023 to elect 12 members (one-third) of Rossendale Borough Council in Lancashire, England. This was on the same day as other local elections across England.

== Summary ==
Following the results, the council remained under Labour control.

=== Election result ===
2023 Rossendale Borough Council election
Party	This election			Full council			This election		
Party	Seats	Net	Seats %	Other	Total	Total %	Votes	Votes %	+/−
Labour	8	▲3	66.7	14	22	61.1	6,470	44.5	+3.3
Conservative	2	▼3	16.7	7	9	25.0	4,957	34.1	–1.7
Community First	1	Steady	8.3	1	2	5.6	783	5.4	+1.1
Independent	0	▼1	0.0	2	2	5.6	169	1.2	–5.1
Green	1	▲1	8.3	0	1	2.8	2,090	14.4	+2.1
Liberal Democrats	0	Steady	0.0	0	0	0.0	84	0.6	N/A

== Results by ward ==
The results for each ward were as follows:

=== Cribden ===
Cribden
Party	Candidate	Votes	%	±%
Labour	Christine Gill	592	56.1	+4.7
Conservative	John Greenwood	359	34.0	–13.8
Green	David Goodwin	95	9.0	N/A
Majority		233	22.1	+21.3
Turnout		1,055	37.1	–5.7
Registered electors		2,843		
Labour hold		Swing	▲9.3	

=== Facit & Shawforth ===
Facit & Shawforth
Party	Candidate	Votes	%	±%
Conservative	Scott Smith	381	43.8	+0.4
Community First	Michael Whitworth	240	27.6	N/A
Labour	Caitlin Chippendale	207	23.8	–1.9
Green	Gillian Hewitt	38	4.4	N/A
Majority		141	16.2	N/A
Turnout		870	31.3	–4.5
Registered electors		2,781		
Conservative hold				

=== Greenfield ===
Greenfield
Party	Candidate	Votes	%	±%
Labour Co-op	Neil Looker	624	44.2	+4.3
Conservative	Jonathan Foxcroft	593	42.0	–7.3
Green	Katrina Brockbank	191	13.5	+5.7
Majority		31	2.2	N/A
Turnout		1,412	33.7	–2.6
Registered electors		4,190		
Labour Co-op gain from Conservative		Swing	▲5.8	

=== Greensclough ===
Greensclough
Party	Candidate	Votes	%	±%
Labour	Judith Driver	697	48.5	N/A
Conservative	Peter Steen	599	41.7	+23.3
Green	Alexander Vijatov	133	9.3	–18.0
Majority		98	6.8	N/A
Turnout		1,437	33.2	–1.5
Registered electors		4,328		
Labour gain from Conservative				

=== Hareholme ===
Hareholme
Party	Candidate	Votes	%	±%
Labour	Patrick Marriott	744	55.7	+2.0
Conservative	Deborah Lord	418	31.3	–4.4
Green	Sara Bird	174	13.0	+2.3
Majority		326	24.4	+6.4
Turnout		1,344	33.1	–3.9
Registered electors		4,063		
Labour hold		Swing	▲3.2	

=== Healey & Whitworth ===
Healey & Whitworth
Party	Candidate	Votes	%	±%
Community First	Dayne Powell	543	70.0	–1.4
Conservative	John Lowe	140	18.1	–10.4
Green	Chich Hewitt	92	11.9	N/A
Majority		403	51.9	+8.9
Turnout		776	26.2	–3.0
Registered electors		2,965		
Community First hold		Swing	▲4.5	

=== Helmshore ===
Helmshore
Party	Candidate	Votes	%	±%
Conservative	Ann Hodgkiss	1,014	51.8	+1.3
Labour	Ann McIntyre	742	37.9	+0.8
Green	Liz Baker	116	5.9	+0.8
Liberal Democrats	Steve Nelson	84	4.3	0.0
Majority		272	13.8	+0.3
Turnout		1,963	42.4	+11.0
Registered electors		4,625		
Conservative hold		Swing	▲0.3	

=== Irwell ===
Irwell
Party	Candidate	Votes	%	±%
Labour	Andy MacNae	544	49.2	+4.3
Conservative	Stuart Haughan	317	28.7	–15.7
Independent	Janet Eaton	169	15.3	N/A
Green	Daniel Brogan	75	6.8	–4.0
Majority		227	20.5	+20.0
Turnout		1,107	26.3	–3.9
Registered electors		4,212		
Labour gain from Conservative		Swing	▲10.0	

=== Longholme ===
Longholme
Party	Candidate	Votes	%	±%
Labour	Mat Norton	778	54.8	+1.0
Conservative	Matthew Littler	469	33.0	–4.0
Green	Terry Bird	174	12.2	+3.1
Majority		309	21.8	+5.0
Turnout		1,427	32.5	–5.3
Registered electors		4,394		
Labour hold		Swing	▲2.5	

=== Stacksteads ===
Stacksteads
Party	Candidate	Votes	%	±%
Labour	Danielle Ashworth	472	62.5	–2.4
Conservative	David Watson	203	26.9	+1.1
Green	Geoff Blow	80	10.6	+1.3
Majority		269	35.6	–3.5
Turnout		763	27.3	–4.1
Registered electors		2,794		
Labour gain from Independent		Swing	▼1.8	

=== Whitewell ===
Whitewell
Party	Candidate	Votes	%	±%
Green	Julie Adshead	773	54.2	+34.1
Labour	Amanda Robertson	451	31.6	–10.7
Conservative	Anthony Cope	201	14.1	–20.5
Majority		322	22.6	N/A
Turnout		1,435	35.0	–4.7
Registered electors		4,104		
Green gain from Labour		Swing	▲22.4	

=== Worsley ===
Worsley
Party	Candidate	Votes	%	±%
Labour	Adrian Lythgoe	619	60.0	+1.8
Conservative	Mark Mills	263	25.5	–2.8
Green	Richard Lord-Navin	149	14.5	+1.1
Majority		356	34.5	+4.6
Turnout		1,037	25.0	–3.6
Registered electors		4,141		
Labour hold		Swing	▲2.3	

== Changes 2023–2024 ==
- 2023: Cllr Steve Hughes (Longholme, Labour) resigned to take up a role as a local government officer. No by-election was held for the seat, as his term was due to end at the May 2024 whole-council election.
