= Kevin Bryan =

British politician

Kevin Alistair Bryan is a British political activist and former chairman of the British National Front (NF), a far-right political party for whites only. He previously held this position between 2013 and 2015 and was deputy chairman, under Ian Edward. He describes himself as "a racial nationalist".

Bryan was previously a member of the British National Party for whom he contested local elections. He was that party's organiser in Newark-on-Trent and in Rochdale. Following a period of disagreement with the policies of the BNP's leader, Nick Griffin, he left the party in 2010 and joined the National Front, and became its deputy chairman a few months later.

He has been a candidate for the NF in national and local elections in the Rossendale area.

== General elections contested ==
Date of election	Constituency	Party	Votes	%
2010	Rossendale and Darwen	NF	1,062	2.3
2015	Rochdale	NF	433	1.0
