= Britannia Coconut Dancers =

Clog dancing group from Lancashire

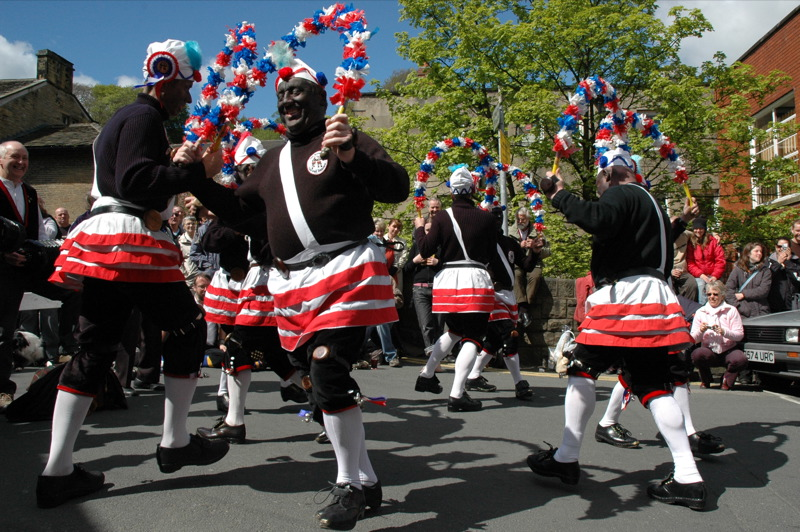
The Nutters performing in 2005

The Britannia Coconut Dancers or Nutters are a troupe of Lancastrian clog dancers who perform every Easter in Bacup, dancing 7 miles (11 km) across the town and surrounding areas after blackening their faces. There are eight dancers and a whipper-in, who controls the proceedings.

== History ==
Some say the custom was brought to the area by Moors who settled in Cornwall in the 17th century, became miners and then moved to work in quarries in Lancashire. It is similar to the Danse des Coco from Provence. This troupe was formed as the Tunstead Mill Nutters in 1857 when it was one of a group of five which performed in the Rossendale valley. According to the Burnley Gazette, a man named Abraham Spencer (1842–1918) was one of the founders back in 1857, at only 15. They passed on their tradition to workers at the Britannia Mill in the 1920s. Their dances feature floral hoops or garlands; the musical accompaniment is provided by a concertina or the Stacksteads Silver Band.

== Costume ==
The group performing at the annual Whitworth rushcart celebration, Lancashire in 2023

Their name refers to the wooden nuts worn at their knees, waists and wrists, which are made from the tops of bobbins. They are protective work gear for the hands and knees, essential in mining work involving crawling. The waist nut is a spare in case of breakage or loss of the others. These are tapped together like castanets as a percussive accompaniment to the dance, the nuts on the hands striking the nuts on the waist or knees in an intricate and dextrous rhythm. They wear white turbans with blue plumes, dark jerseys and trews, a white baldric, red and white skirts, white hose and black clogs.

== Blackface ==
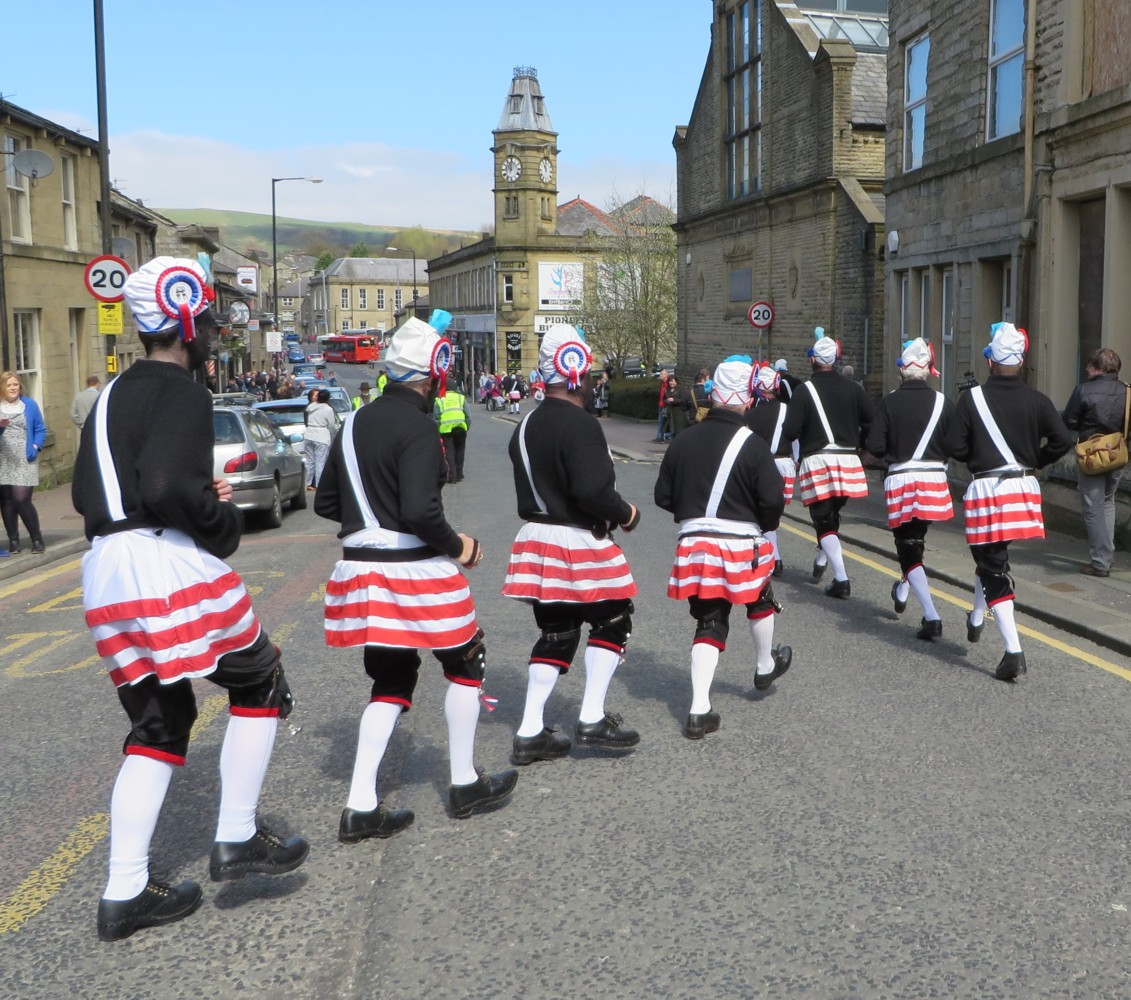
In 2014

The group's performance in blackface is popularly explained as either due to the origins of the dance in the mining community, a reference to the dancers' ancient origin as Barbary pirates, or as a disguise to ward off evil spirits. Theresa Buckland's (1990) research discusses the possible origin of the tradition in minstrel shows, which were performing in the UK concurrently with the earliest references to the Nutters. She suggested that over time the dancers may have developed and passed on an alternative history of their tradition, one that does not include the connection to minstrelsy. However she also noted that explaining the blackened faces as a portrayal of coal miners is an "interpretation which has some credibility since a number of earlier dancers were colliers in the district". The issue caused controversy in 2014, when local politician Will Straw was photographed with them. He defended the custom: "... its traditions from the past which give communities a sense of common identity for the present and the future. May the Coconutters continue for many years to come."

== Membership ==
One long-standing member of the troupe is Dick Shufflebottom, whose service of 50 years was celebrated in 2006 and who continued as an active member in 2013, aged 76. The youngest member of the troupe at that time was Gavin McNulty, age 26.

== Performances ==
The main annual performance is on Easter Saturday,^{[A]} but rehearsals take place weekly throughout the year and form a social occasion. In 2013, the annual performance was threatened by public sector austerity as the police and local authority threatened to withdraw support for the traffic management and security at the event. The troupe also perform at many other local events but perhaps most significantly dancing the route of the parade from Broadclough Mill and onstage during the Bacup and Stacksteads Carnival, as well as being the home troupe at "The Crown Affair" which is an annual event on the first Sunday in July, which the troupe organises in conjunction with The Crown Inn.

== Review ==
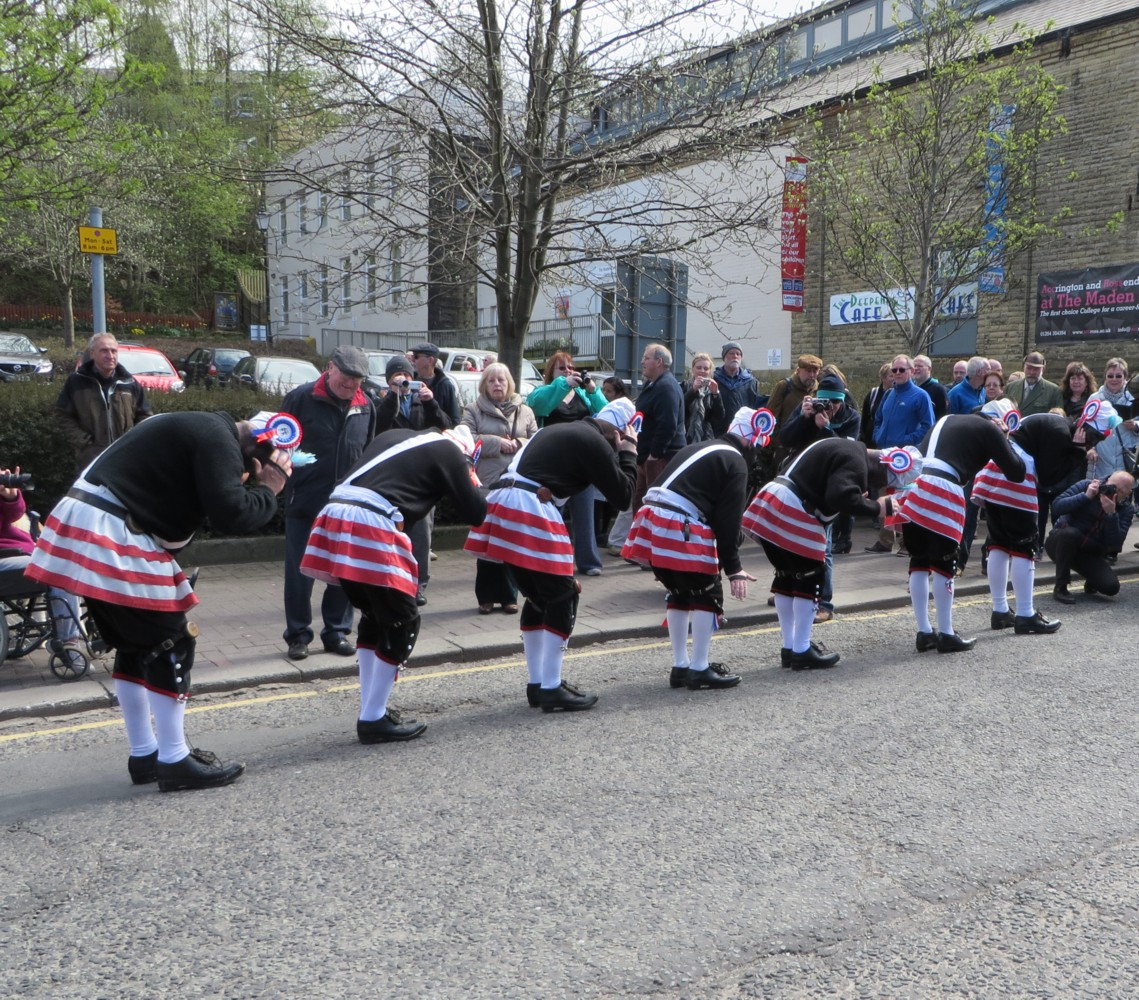
In 2014

AA Gill, writing in The Sunday Times, described them as bizarrely compelling:

The dance begins with each Nutter cocking a hand to his ear to listen to something we human folk can’t catch. They then wag a finger at each other, and they’re off, stamping and circling, occasionally holding bent wands covered with red, white and blue rosettes that they weave into simple patterns. It’s not pretty and it’s not clever. It is, simply, awe-inspiringly, astonishingly other. Morris men from southern troupes come and watch in slack-jawed silence. Nothing in the civilised world is quite as elementally bizarre and awkwardly compelling as the Coco-nutters of Bacup.

== Recordings ==
A five-minute black-and-white film, shot in 1930, with a new musical accompaniment, is included in the DVD Here's a Health to the Barley Mow, issued by the BFI in 2011.

A 2-minute and 18-second excerpt of the music used for the dancing, recorded in 1972, is included on the album The Voice of the People, Volume 16: You Lazy Lot of Bone Shakers – Songs & Dance Tunes of Seasonal Events, issued by Topic Records. Topic included this recording as Track One on the second CD in their 70-year anniversary boxed set Three Score and Ten.

== See also ==
- Garland dance
- Molly dance
- Saddleworth Morris Men

== Notes ==
^A Easter Saturday here refers to the term's meaning in common usage, the day before Easter Sunday, properly known as Holy Saturday, not the more accurate use of the term Easter Saturday which designates the Saturday following Easter Sunday.
