= Listed buildings in Bacup =

Bacup is a town in Rossendale, Lancashire, England. It contains 78 buildings that are recorded in the National Heritage List for England as designated listed buildings. Of these, two are listed at Grade II*, the middle grade, and the others are at Grade II, the lowest grade. The parish contains the town of Bacup, the villages of Broadclough and Stacksteads, and surrounding countryside. Until the Industrial Revolution the area was agricultural. The first industry in the town was woollen weaving, followed by cotton weaving. This was initially carried out in houses specifically designed for this purpose, and later at a larger scale in mills. The earliest mills were water-powered, and they were superseded by steam power in the second quarter of the 19th century. Further expansion of industry followed the arrival of the railway in 1852. The weaving industry has since been replaced by other diversified industries.

This history is reflected in the listed buildings. The oldest of these, dating from the 17th and 18th centuries, are farmhouses and farm buildings. In the late 17th and early 18th century, came houses and cottages with stepped windows that were used for domestic weaving. Later the listed buildings include mills, larger houses built by industrialists, public buildings, churches and chapels, and two war memorials.

== Key ==
Grade	Criteria
II*	Particularly important buildings of more than special interest
II	Buildings of national importance and special interest

== Buildings ==
Name and location	Photograph	Date	Notes	Grade
Waggoner Tunstead Farmhouse; 53.69580°N 2.22355°W		1632	The farmhouse is in sandstone with quoins and stone-slate roofs, in two storeys with a basement. It consists of a main two-bay range, a two-bay cross wing, and a single-bay rear wing. The windows are mullioned, and some are also transomed. In the front gable end of the cross wing is a Tudor arched doorway, and at the rear is a wide doorway with moulded jambs and an inscribed lintel.	II*
Barn, Fairwall Farm; 53.68853°N 2.21102°W	—	1672	The barn is in sandstone with a stone-slate roof and has three bays with various additions. There are a number of openings, including a doorway that has a lintel inscribed with initials and the date. Inside is a full cruck truss.	II
Fearns Hall and Farmhouse; 53.69360°N 2.23773°W		1696	Originally a farmhouse, with the east wing added in 1830, and later divided into two dwellings. It is in sandstone with quoins and tiled roofs. The house has two storeys and is in two three-bay ranges forming a roughly rectangular plan. Facing the road is a two-storey gabled porch in pale stone that forms a crude portico with a large lintel. The upper storey is slightly jettied, and contains a datestone and a mullioned window. Elsewhere the windows are mullioned and transomed.	II
Dike House Farmhouse and barn 53.71581°N 2.20607°W	—	1720	The house and attached barn are in sandstone with a stone-slate roof. The house has two storeys and two bays, with a projecting single-storey gabled porch at the right end containing a plain doorway. In the gable is a datestone decorated with s sun motif, a flower, initials, and the date. To the right of the house is a barn with a sliding door, and a lean-to extension at the rear.	II
Lee Farmhouse; 53.68910°N 2.20508°W		Early 18th century	The farmhouse was altered in about 1800. It is in sandstone with a stone-slate roof. There are three bays; the first bay has three storeys and the others have two. On the front is a single-storey gabled porch and there are mullioned windows in the two bays at the right. The first bay on the left contains a doorway with a plain surround, a casement window with mullions and, in the top floor, a stepped three-light window.	II
Middle Brex Farmhouse; 53.71182°N 2.22640°W	—	Early 18th century (probable)	A sandstone house with quoins and a stone-slate roof in two storeys and three bays. On the front is a two-storey gabled porch with a plain doorway, a square peephole to the left and a square window above. The porch is flanked by stepped windows, those in the ground floor having three lights, and those above with five.	II
The Greens; 53.70706°N 2.19124°W	—	1732	A house that was extended in 1766 and 1770, and later divided into two dwellings. It is in sandstone with quoins and a slate roof. There are two storeys with an attic, and a central portion of three bays with single-bay extensions at both ends. On the front is a two-storey gabled porch containing a doorway that has an architrave and an inscribed pediment. Above the doorway is a round-headed window with Ionic colonnettes and a keystone, and over this is a square datestone. The other windows are of varying types, and there are two more datestones.	II
Fairwall Farmhouse; 53.68856°N 2.21068°W		1748	A sandstone house with quoins and a roof of stone-slate at the front and slate at the rear. There are two storeys and two bays. On the front is a two-storey gabled porch that has a doorway with a large rectangular lintel, an inscribed datestone, and a round-headed window. The windows are casements, probably replacing mullioned windows.	II
Stocks; 53.70406°N 2.19951°W		1748	The stocks were moved into the Wall of History Park in 2006. They consist of two side posts with slots containing wooden rails that have holes for the legs of two people.	II
2 and 4 Lord's Court; 53.71551°N 2.20045°W	—	18th century	A pair of sandstone cottages, partly rendered, with a stone-slate roof, in two storeys. Each cottage has one bay and a doorway with a plain surround to the right. The right doorway has a slab canopy. The right window on the ground floor has twelve panes; the others have two lights with a mullion, the right light being sashed. Over the left door is a name plate.	II
Old Bridge; 53.71750°N 2.19858°W	—	18th century (probable)	A small disused sandstone bridge over the River Irwell, consisting of a single low segmental arch with a short retaining wall. Parts of it are missing, it is overgrown, and it has been superseded by a newer bridge.	II
Pinfold; 53.70996°N 2.19278°W		18th century (probable)	The pinfold is to the east of Cow Toot Farm. It is a circular structure in dry stone about 50 metres (160 ft) in diameter, and it has an entrance on the southeast side.	II
Toll House; 53.71765°N 2.17147°W		18th century	The former toll house is in roughcast stone with a tile roof, in two storeys and one bay. On the front is a two-storey canted bay. The windows have modern glazing. There is a small lean-to on the left, and a modern extension on the right.	II
Rockcliffe Wood; 53.69505°N 2.20876°W	—	1752	Originally a farmhouse, the house is in sandstone with quoins and a slate roof. It has two storeys and three bays. On the front there is a two-storey gabled porch with a plain doorway, a casement window, and a datestone. There is another doorway in the first bay, and in the second bay are mullioned windows.	II
20 and 22 Yorkshire Street; 53.70387°N 2.20000°W		1770	Originally probably a warehouse, it has since been used for other purposes. The building is in sandstone with quoins and a stone-slate roof. There are two storeys with attics in gables facing the road, and two bays. The doorway has a moulded surround, pilasters, a plain frieze, and a dentilled cornice. To the left of the doorway is a double window, and to the right a single window, all with wavy pediments containing inscribed medallions. In the first floor there are rectangular casement windows, in the gables are round-headed windows with imposts and keystones, and at the rear are rows of mullioned windows.	II
211 and 213 Burnley Road; 53.73240°N 2.19863°W	—	Late 18th century	Originally two cottages, later combined into one dwelling, it is in sandstone with a stone-slate roof. There are two storeys and two bays, and on the front is a single-storey gabled porch. Some of the windows are mullioned, and others are casements.	II
215 and 217 Burnley Road; 53.73242°N 2.19876°W	—	Late 18th century	A pair of sandstone cottages with a stone-slate roof, in two storeys. Each cottage has one bay, and a doorway in a porch. The windows are stepped and all have three lights.	II
219, 221, and 223 Burnley Road; 53.73247°N 2.19890°W	—	Late 18th century	A row of three sandstone cottages with a stone-slate roof in two storeys. Each cottage has one bay, with a doorway to the right. There are three-light stepped windows in the ground floor of all cottages, and in the upper floor of No. 223. Nos.219 and 221 have casement windows in the upper floor. No. 223 also has a vaulted cellar approached by a flight of stone spiral steps.	II
10 and 11 Esther Place; 53.70521°N 2.19740°W	—	Late 18th century	A sandstone house with a slate roof in two storeys and with a symmetrical two-bay front. The doorway has a plain surround. On the front are stepped windows with three lights on the ground floor and five in the upper floor, all with diamond glazing. There are two more three-light stepped windows at the rear in the upper floor, and in the ground floor are a doorway and three small windows.	II
36, 38 and 40 Todmorden Road; 53.70727°N 2.19011°W	—	Late 18th century	Originally three cottages, later converted into two dwellings, they are in sandstone with a stone-slate roof, and have two storeys. Each former cottage has one bay, the doorways have plain surrounds, and there are three-light stepped windows in both floors, some of which have been altered.	II
42 Todmorden Road; 53.70736°N 2.18992°W	—	Late 18th century	A sandstone house with a stone-slate roof in two storeys and two bays. It has a doorway with a plain surround. The windows are stepped, and all have five lights except for the right window in the ground floor, which has three lights.	II
142 and 144 Todmorden Road; 53.70984°N 2.18557°W	—	Late 18th century	A pair of sandstone cottages with a stone-slate roof in two storeys. Each house has one bay. No. 142 has a gabled porch, and No. 144 has an altered window in the ground floor. The other windows are stepped, with three lights in the ground floor and five in the upper floor.	II
156 and 158 Todmorden Road; 53.71010°N 2.18525°W	—	Late 18th century	A pair of sandstone cottages with a stone-slate roof in two storeys. Each house has one bay. The doorways are plain, and most of the windows are stepped with three lights. There is also a single-light window in the upper floor.	II
164 and 166 Todmorden Road; 53.71027°N 2.18502°W	—	Late 18th century	A pair of cottages, later converted into a single dwelling, in sandstone with a stone-slate roof, and with two storeys and two bays. On the front is a plain doorway and a blocked doorway. The windows in the ground floor are sashes, and in the upper floor are two five-light stepped windows, the central lights containing sashes. The rear is rendered and contains a doorway, two small windows, and an extension.	II
168 Todmorden Road; 53.71033°N 2.18496°W	—	Late 18th century	The cottage is in sandstone with a stone-slate roof, and has two storeys and one bay. The doorway, to the right, has a plain surround. The windows are stepped, those in the ground floor with three lights and those above with five; the central lights contain sashes. At the rear is a brick lean-to extension and two square windows.	II
170 Todmorden Road; 53.71037°N 2.18493°W	—	Late 18th century	A sandstone cottage with a stone-slate roof, in two storeys and with one bay. The doorway, to the right, has a plain surround. The windows are stepped, those in the ground floor with three lights and those above with five. At the rear is a three-light stepped window in the ground floor and two sash windows above.	II
Carr Bank; 53.68292°N 2.24351°W	—	Late 18th century	Three cottages, two at the front and one at the rear, in sandstone with a stone-slate roof. They have three storeys and a symmetrical two-bay front. On the front is a lean-to porch with paired doorways. The windows on the front are stepped with three lights, and on the sides they are mullioned.	II
Clifton Farmhouse; 53.73088°N 2.21723°W		Late 18th century	Originally a farmhouse and attached cottage, later combined into a single dwelling, it is in sandstone with a stone-slate roof, and has two storeys. Each part has two bays, with a symmetrical front and a central doorway. On the front of the former house is a single-storey gabled porch. Most of the windows on the front are stepped with three lights, and at the rear are small windows and a two-light mullioned window. Under the former house is a vaulted cellar.	II
Dog Pits Farmhouse and barn 53.71833°N 2.19588°W	—	Late 18th century (probable)	Originally a farmhouse and attached barn, later converted into a house, it is in sandstone with a stone-slate roof. The former farmhouse has two storeys and three bays, and a single-storey gabled porch. On the front are Venetian-style three-light mullioned windows. The former barn to the left has a round-arched wagon entrance, a plain doorway and a window. On the left of the barn is a two-storey lean-to former stable.	II
Lower Top o'th' Bank Farmhouse; 53.69918°N 2.21766°W	—	Late 18th century	The house, which incorporates datestones from the 17th century, and the attached barn are in sandstone. The roof of the house is in slate and that of the barn is in stone-slate. The house has two storeys and both the house and the barn have three bays. In the house is a plain doorway and three stepped three-light windows on each floor, and the barn contains large round-headed wagon entrances.	II
Ivy Cottage; 53.70227°N 2.20301°W		1776	A sandstone cottage with quoins and a stone-slate roof, in two storeys and two bays. Apart from one casement window, the windows are mullioned. The doorway has plain jambs, small imposts, a stepped inscribed lintel, and a moulded slab canopy on beaked brackets. In the gable end facing the road is a blocked Venetian-style attic window.	II
129 and 122 Booth Road; 53.69351°N 2.23233°W	—	c. 1800	A pair of sandstone cottages with s stone-slate roof in two storeys. Each cottage has one bay, and the plain doorways are paired in the centre. There are three-light stepped windows in both floors at the front and at the rear, and smaller windows in the upper floor and in the left return. To the left is a small single-storey extension.	II
12, 14 and 16 King Street; 53.70191°N 2.20078°W	—	c. 1800	Originally three cottages, later used for other purposes, they are in sandstone with a stone-slate roof. There are two storeys and three bays. The openings in the ground floor have been altered, and above are stepped windows, the central window with five lights, and the others with three. There are more stepped windows at the rear, and two plain doorways.	II
320 and 322 Newchurch Road; 53.69132°N 2.22493°W	—	c. 1800	A pair of houses later converted into shops. They are in sandstone with a stone-slate roof, each in one bay, with two storeys at the front and three at the rear. There are shop fronts in the ground floor, and sash windows above. At the rear are three-light stepped windows.	II
366 and 368 Newchurch Road; 53.69143°N 2.22708°W		c. 1800	A pair of sandstone houses with a roof partly of slate and partly of stone-slate, each house having one bay. They are on a sloping site and have two storeys at the front, three at the back, and attics. On the front are two plain doorways and rectangular windows, and on the left return is a flight of external steps leading to a first floor doorway. At the rear are two doorways, two three-light stepped windows in each floor, and smaller windows.	II
38 and 40 Oakenclough Road; 53.70530°N 2.18649°W	—	c. 1800	A pair of sandstone cottages, partly rendered, with a stone-slate roof, and in two storeys. Each cottage has one bay. The doorways have plain surrounds and are paired in the centre. In each floor are three-light stepped windows.	II
22, 24 and 26 Rake Head Lane; 53.68908°N 2.23541°W	—	c. 1800	A row of three sandstone cottages with quoins and a stone-slate roof. They have two storeys and each cottage is in one bay. The doorways have plain surrounds, and the windows on the front are stepped with three lights. On the right return is a mullioned window.	II
16 Rochdale Road; 53.70153°N 2.19871°W	—	c. 1800	A sandstone house with a stone-slate roof in three storeys and with one bay. The doorway has a plain surround, and the windows are stepped with three lights.	II
19 and 21 Rochdale Road; 53.70175°N 2.19923°W	—	c. 1800	A pair of sandstone cottages, one of which has been converted into a shop, with a stone-slate roof. There are two storeys at the front and three at the rear, and each cottage has one bay. In the ground floor of No. 19 is a shop front, and No. 21 has a doorway with a plain surround. The other windows on the front are sashes, and at the rear are stepped three-light windows.	II
23 Rochdale Road; 53.70168°N 2.19919°W	—	c. 1800	A sandstone cottage with a stone-slate roof in one bay. There are two storeys at the front and three at the rear. On the front is a plain doorway and sash windows, those on the ground floor being paired. At the rear is a doorway, square windows, and stepped three-light windows.	II
Lane Ends Farmhouse; 53.69500°N 2.19608°W	—	c. 1800	A sandstone house with quoins and a stone-slate roof in two storeys. It has two wide bays, with a symmetrical entrance front away from the road. This contains a plain doorway with a rectangular lintel flanked by stepped mullioned windows. There is also one casement window.	II
Moss Meadows Cottage; 53.69133°N 2.19787°W	—	c. 1800	This consists of a house with an attached barn in sandstone. The house has a slate roof, and the roof of the barn is in stone-slate. The house has two storeys and two bays, with a two-storey gabled porch containing a plain doorway. There are three-light stepped windows in both floors. At the rear is a square stair window, and two casement windows on each floor. The barn to the left contains opposed segmental-headed wagon doors, and plain doorways.	II
Moss Meadows Farmhouse; 53.69110°N 2.20019°W	—	c. 1800	The house and adjoining barn are in sandstone with stone-slate roofs. The house has two storeys and two bays. There is a two-storey gabled porch with a plain doorway. One of the windows is stepped with three lights, and the others are modern. The barn to the left contains opposed segmental-headed wagon doors.	II
Stubbylee Hall; 53.69281°N 2.20319°W		1809	A country house, altered in 1872, and later used as offices. It is in sandstone ashlar and has a hipped slate roof, and is in Neoclassical style. The house has an L-shaped plan, with a main block and a rear wing, it has fronts of three and five bays, and is in two storeys. The main front is symmetrical, the three central bays flanked by segmentally curved bays. The central bay protrudes slightly forward under a pediment and contains a porch with corner pilasters, engaged Ionic columns, a frieze containing a roundel, a prominent cornice, and a balustraded parapet. The windows are sashes. At the rear is a three-light stair window and a datestone.	II
The Laurels; 53.70121°N 2.20225°W		1815–17	A large house, also known as Forest House, in stone with a hipped tile roof. It is in Neoclassical style and has a T-shaped plan. The main block has fronts of five and three bays and is in two storeys; behind it is a service wing with three bays on each front and three storeys. The central three bays of the entrance front are recessed behind four giant Ionic columns. Behind them is a doorway with a fanlight flanked by sash windows. The outer bays contain large round-headed windows, at the top of the house is a cornice and a low parapet, and at the rear is a central pediment. Inside the house is a domed lobby with Doric columns.	II*
Broadclough Hall; 53.71161°N 2.20442°W	—	1816	A stone house with a hipped slate roof in Neoclassical style. It has two storeys and a square plan with five bays on each front. The central three bays of the entrance front protrude forward under a pediment and contain a porch with Tuscan columns, a triglyph frieze, and a cornice. The doorway has a segmental arch and Tuscan pilasters, and the windows are sashes. In the left return is a Tudor arched doorway with a re-set lintel dated 1666. At the rear is a stair window, and a workshop with a mullioned window.	II
Broadclough Mill; 53.71304°N 2.20246°W		c. 1823	This originated as a water-powered woollen mill, it was converted to steam in 1830, and later used for cotton spinning, and then for light industry. It is in sandstone with slate roofs, and has a brick chimney at the rear. The mill consists of a rectangular block in three storeys and seven bays, with a two-storey gabled engine house to the left. In the main block is a round-headed doorway with plain jambs, imposts, voussoirs, and a projecting inscribed keystone. The engine house contains a wagon entrance with a depressed arch.	II
15 Yorkshire Street; 53.70365°N 2.20002°W	—	Early 19th century	A sandstone house with a stone-slate roof in three storeys and with three bays. It has a plinth and a moulded cornice. The doorway has a plain surround and a rectangular fanlight, and the windows are sashes.	II
Stacksteads Mill; 53.69255°N 2.22097°W	—	1833	Originally a cotton spinning mill, it is in sandstone, and has a stone-slate roof with ventilators and skylights. The main part of the mill has a rectangular plan with fronts of eleven and three bays and is in 4 1/2 storeys. To the east is an extension of three by two bays, and at the west is the former engine house. An extension to the engine house has a round-headed wagon entrance and a clock face.	II
Waterside Mill; 53.70542°N 2.20307°W		1839	A former cotton mill, in sandstone with a slate roof. It has a rectangular plan with 3 1/2 storeys, and has eleven bays. The front facing the road is gabled, and contains a three-storey extension containing the engine house and a chimney, now cut down. To the left of this is a round-headed wagon entrance with a dated keystone. Along the sides are rectangular windows.	II
Waterloo Hotel; 53.70230°N 2.19969°W		c. 1840	A public house in sandstone with a hipped slate roof. It has a square plan, with three storeys and symmetrical fronts of three bays. In the centre of each front is a round-headed doorway with a plain surround and a keystone. The windows also have plain surrounds and are sashes.	II
Holy Trinity Church; 53.69159°N 2.22489°W		1840–41	The original part of the church is in Norman style with tall round-headed windows, and in 1873 a chancel and transept were added in Decorated style. The church is in sandstone with a slate roof, and consists of a nave, a chancel and a south transept, and a west tower with a small spire. The tower has three stages, with an octagonal bell stage. Inside the church is a west gallery, and a round chancel arch.	II
Britannia Mill; 53.69067°N 2.18314°W		1845–46	This was built as an integrated cotton spinning and weaving mill, a warehouse was added in 1865, a new engine house in 1865, followed by offices, a weaving shed and a preparation room. It is in sandstone with Welsh slate roofs. It consists of a four-storey spinning block with a single-storey office, a two-storey warehouse to the east, a ten-bay weaving shed incorporating an engine house at the rear, a square chimney, and a detached warehouse to the west. There is a reservoir to the north.	II
Mechanics Institute; 53.70344°N 2.20018°W		1846	The building has since been used as a public library. It is in Neoclassical style, and constructed in sandstone ashlar with a hipped slate roof. It has a rectangular plan with fronts of three and eight bays, and is in two storeys. The entrance front is symmetrical, with corner pilasters, a moulded cornice, a plain parapet, and a Tuscan doorcase. The windows on the side are sashes.	II
Waterbarn Baptist Chapel; 53.69083°N 2.23500°W		1847	The former chapel is in sandstone with a slate roof. It has a rectangular plan and is in two storeys. The entrance front is symmetrical with pilastered corners, a moulded cornice, and a pedimented gable. In the ground floor are two doorways with rectangular fanlights and cornices on brackets, and between them are two round-headed windows. In the upper floor is a Venetian window flanked by round-headed windows, and in the pediment is an inscribed tablet. Along the sides are seven windows in each floor, those in the ground floor being rectangular, and those above having round heads. Inside the chapel is a horseshoe-shaped gallery.	II
Bankside Hall and House; 53.70191°N 2.20325°W		Mid 19th century	Originally one house, later divided into two dwellings, it is in sandstone with a hipped slate roof. There are two storeys, and the house has a T-shaped plan, with a long service wing to the rear. The front is symmetrical with five bays, the outer bays being slightly set back. The front has rusticated quoins, a moulded cornice, and a plain parapet. There is a central single-storey square porch with corner pilasters, a frieze, a cornice, and a low parapet. On its left side is an elliptical-headed doorway, and the porch is flanked by single-storey canted bay windows. All the windows are sashes with moulded architraves.	II
Coach house, Broadclough Hall; 53.71190°N 2.20422°W	—	Mid 19th century	The coach house has been converted into flats. It is in ashlar and has a hipped slate roof with red ridge tiles. The building has a rectangular plan and is in two storeys. The front is recessed under eaves supported by iron columns. The openings include a segmental-arched wagon entrance with voussoirs, doorways, square windows and bull's eye windows.	II
Entrances to railway tunnels 53.69136°N 2.24869°W		1851	The tunnels were built for the East Lancashire Railway, the second being added in 1878–81 when the line was doubled. The entrances are in gritstone and consist two parabolic arches with rusticated voussoirs. The surrounding wall has a parapet and three piers.	II
Christ Church; 53.70671°N 2.19355°W		1854	The church, designed by Sharpe and Paley in Geometrical style, is in sandstone with a slate roof. It consists of a nave with a clerestory, aisles, a chancel, and a southwest tower. The tower is in three stages with a plain parapet, and has an octagonal stair tower rising to a greater height and terminating in a pinnacled lantern. Most of the windows are paired lancets, there is a wheel window at the west end, and triple stepped lancets at the east end.	II
St Saviour's Church; 53.69393°N 2.20353°W		1864–65	The church, designed by Edward Wyndham Tarn in Gothic Revival style, is constructed in sandstone with slate roofs. It consists of a nave with a clerestory, aisles, a north porch, a south baptistry, a chancel with a polygonal apse, and a northeast steeple. The steeple has a three-stage tower, a polygonal stair turret, and a broach spire with lucarnes. Inside the church is a west gallery.	II
Vicarage, St Saviour's Church; 53.69382°N 2.20297°W		1864–65 (probable)	The former vicarage is in sandstone with quoins and a slate roof in two storeys with an attic. It has three bays with a projecting wing. The wing is gabled at one end, and at the other is a three-stage tower with a pyramidal roof and a pierced parapet. In the ground floor of the wing is an arched doorway with a roundel in the arch. Most of the windows are mullioned and transomed, and there are also cross windows and a single-story polygonal bay window.	II
Gate arch, St Saviour's Church; 53.69424°N 2.20446°W		c. 1865	The gate arch is in the churchyard wall of St Saviour's Church. It is surrounded by stepped blocks of sandstone that form a gable with a trefoil in the apex. The arch is pointed, and contains ornamental gates with traceried open panels.	II
9 King Street; 53.70201°N 2.20047°W	—	1860s	A house and shop in sandstone with a slate roof, in two storeys and three bays. In the first two bays of the ground floor are a shop front framed by rusticated quoins, containing a central recessed doorway flanked by windows with slender columns. Above this is a decorated entablature. The right bay contains a narrow round-headed doorway with plain jambs and carved imposts, and a sash window. The window and the three windows in the upper floor are recessed and have shafts of polished stone with foliated capitals, moulded lintels, and round heads with banded voussoirs.	II
Old Market Hall; 53.70215°N 2.20164°W		1865–67	The former market hall is in sandstone with roofs that are partly slated and partly glazed. It has a rectangular plan with fronts of three and eight bays. The building stands on a sloping site and is partly in two, and partly in three, storeys. In the three-bay front to Bank Street is a giant round-headed entrance arch with a rusticated surround, above which is a cornice and a pediment. In the outer bays are paired round-headed windows. On the left return are eight shops in an arcade of segmental arches with cast iron beams and columns. Above these are pairs of segmental-headed windows.	II
Stable and coach house, Rockcliffe House; 53.69433°N 2.20973°W	—	Mid to late 19th century (probable)	The stables and coach house are in three ranges around a quadrangle with a screen wall on the east side, the north range being detached. The buildings are in sandstone with slate roofs and have two storeys. The ranges contain various openings, and the L-shaped north range incorporates a coachman's cottage at the east end.	II
18 and 20 Market Street; 53.70239°N 2.20095°W		1870	The former bank is on a corner site, and has later been used for other purposes. It is in sandstone with a slate roof, and is in Scottish baronial style. The building has two storeys, attics, and a basement. The entrance is on the corner, and above it is a circular turret with two lancet windows, a deep parapet, and a conical roof. Other features include gables of unequal size, one of which includes a carved coat of arms, and friezes, one of which projects and is supported on the heads of carved beasts holding shields. Some of the windows are sashes and other are lancets.	II
Munn Monument; 53.69169°N 2.22515°W	—	1873	The monument is in the churchyard of Holy Trinity Church. It is in sandstone, and consists of a carved pinnacle in Gothic style. The monument has a square section, a stepped base, buttressed corners, polished shafts, crocketed gablets, and an octagonal spirelet. On the sides are carved panels, one containing a bust of James Munn.	II
Milestone; 53.71704°N 2.19960°W	—	Late 19th century	The milestone is in sandstone and is set into a wall. It consists of a slab with a rounded top, and is inscribed with the name of the borough. and the distances in miles to Bacup, Rochdale and Burnley.	II
Gateway, Stubbylee Park; 53.69419°N 2.20494°W		Late 19th century (probable)	The gateway consists of a pair of piers flanking the entrance, joined by curving walls to a pair of smaller piers. The piers and walls are in sandstone, and the ornate gates are cast iron. All the piers are octagonal with moulded caps. The central pair have embattled tops and bulbous crocketed finials.	II
Church of St John the Evangelist; 53.70366°N 2.20244°W		1882–83	The church, by Medland and Taylor, is in sandstone with a patterned slate roof. It consists of a nave, aisles, a polygonal west baptistry with a pyramidal roof, a south transept, and a chancel with a basement and flanking offices. At the southwest is the stump of an uncompleted tower that serves as a porch. The windows contain Geometric tracery, and at the west end is a rose window.	II
Cast iron wall 53.70268°N 2.19940°W	—	1883–84	The cast iron wall is part of a bridge that formerly crossed the River Irwell, and is in Gothic style. It is in five sections, each containing three Tudor arched panels and moulded battlements. On the front is a moulded coat of arms and inscriptions.	II
Gate arch, Rockcliffe House; 53.69354°N 2.20832°W	—	c. 1890 (probable)	The gate arch is in the boundary wall of the house. It is in sandstone, and its flanking wall rises in three ramps to a square pedestal with a ball finial. The gateway has a segmental head and a rusticated surround with a keystone. The ornamental gates are in wrought iron.	II
Gate piers, Rockcliffe House; 53.69453°N 2.20677°W	—	c. 1890	There are six sandstone piers, the four central ones flanking main and side gateways. Outside these, an S-shape wall leads to two more piers. The piers have vermiculated bands, and dentilled caps. The caps have segmental-headed faces, each containing different carvings. Four of the piers also have round-topped finials with carved faces.	II
Rockcliffe House; 53.69406°N 2.20903°W	—	1891	A large stone house, later divided into two dwellings, with a hipped slate roof. It is in Italianate style and has two storeys. The house has a T-shaped plan, consisting of a square main block with three bays on each front, and a service wing to the rear. The features include a balustraded parapet with urns, a dentiled cornice, a portico with fluted Composite columns, canted bay windows, and sash windows, some of which have pediments.	II
Lodge, Rockcliffe House; 53.69450°N 2.20703°W	—	1890s (probable)	The lodge is in ashlar with a hipped slate roof, and has one storey. It is in Italianate style. The lodge has a roughly square plan, with a plinth, rusticated pilasters, a cornice, and a parapet with urn finials. On the front facing the drive is a bow window with a frieze, and a porch with a round-headed doorway. The front facing the road has a canted bay window and round-headed panels with fluted keystones.	II
Maden Memorial Fountain, Stubbylee Park; 53.69229°N 2.20331°W		1912	A drinking fountain in granite set on three steps. It has a rectangular plan, and consists of a plinth containing semicircular bowls. On the sides are engaged Tuscan columns, and at the top is a pedimented entablature with a dentilled cornice. Above the bowls are bronze spouts in the shape of lions' heads. Also on the fountain are a bronze relief panel of the donor, and an inscribed bronze plaque.	II
War memorial 53.70374°N 2.20193°W	—	1924	The war memorial is in the churchyard of the Church of St John the Evangelist. It is in Yorkshire stone, and has a decorative pedestal with a canopy and panels. This stands on a chamfered plinth, a podium and a step. The shaft is tapered, it carries a Bottony cross, and on the front is a laurel wreath in relief. The panels contain inscriptions and the names of those lost in both World Wars.	II
Bacup cenotaph 53.70371°N 2.20136°W		1928	The cenotaph is a war memorial in a garden, and is in sandstone. There is a pedestal and a plinth, on which is a tall rectangular shaft with canted corners and inscribed panels relating to both World Wars. The top section includes the town arms in a wreath, and a chest tomb.	II
