= Christ Church, Bacup =

Coordinates: 53.7068°N 2.1935°W

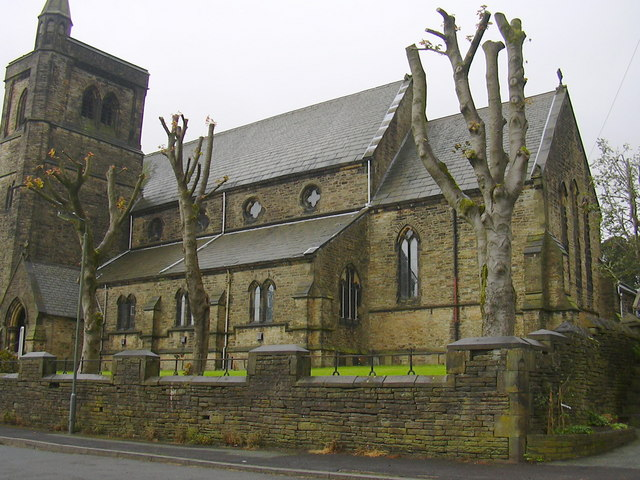
- Christ Church, Bacup, from the southeast

- Location in the Borough of Rossendale
- OS grid reference: SD 873,233
- Location: Beech Street, Bacup, Lancashire
- Country: English
- Denomination: Anglican
- Website: Christ Church, Bacup

History
- Status: Parish church

Architecture
- Heritage designation: Grade II
- Designated: 30 November 1984
- Architect: Sharpe and Paley
- Architectural type: Church
- Style: Gothic Revival
- Completed: 1854
- Construction cost: Over £3,000

Specifications
- Materials: Sandstone rubble, slate roof

Administration
- Province: York
- Diocese: Manchester
- Archdeaconry: Bolton
- Deanery: Rossendale
- Parish: Christ Church, Bacup

Clergy
- Vicar: Rev D. Woodall

The former Christ Church building - now known as Rossendale Digital Bacup Campus - is in Beech Street, off Todmorden Road, Bacup, Lancashire, England. It is a former Anglican parish church in the deanery of Rossendale, the archdeaconry of Bolton and the diocese of Manchester and has been acquired by a local business to convert into Rossendale's first dedicated digital centre. The church is recorded in the National Heritage List for England as a designated Grade II listed building.

== History ==
The church was built in 1854, and paid for from the legacy of a local manufacturer, James Heyworth. It was designed by the Lancaster firm of architects Sharpe and Paley. The church cost over £3,000 (equivalent to £290,000 in 2025), and contained seating for 500 people. In 2012 it was decided that the church will close, and its congregation will share the premises of the Central Methodist Church. Its last service was held on 26 August 2012, and it was thereafter closed.

== Architecture ==
=== Exterior ===
Christ Church is constructed in sandstone rubble with a slate roof. Its architectural style is Gothic Revival. The plan consists of a southwest tower, a four-bay nave with north and south aisles, a porch, and a clerestory, and a two-bay chancel. The tower is in three stages and has diagonal buttresses rising halfway up the tower. At its southeast corner is a polygonal stair turret rising to a greater height than the tower and surmounted by a pinnacled lantern. It has a three-light west window in the lowest stage with smaller three-light windows in the middle stage on the west and south sides. The top stage contains two-light bell openings and at the top is a plain parapet. At the west end of the body of the church are triple two-light windows with a wheel window above them in the gable. At the east end is a triple lancet window.

=== Interior ===
The reredos is in stone with blind arcades, crockets, and images of faces. The pulpit is in a similar style. The church contains a pair of stained glass windows by Shrigley and Hunt.

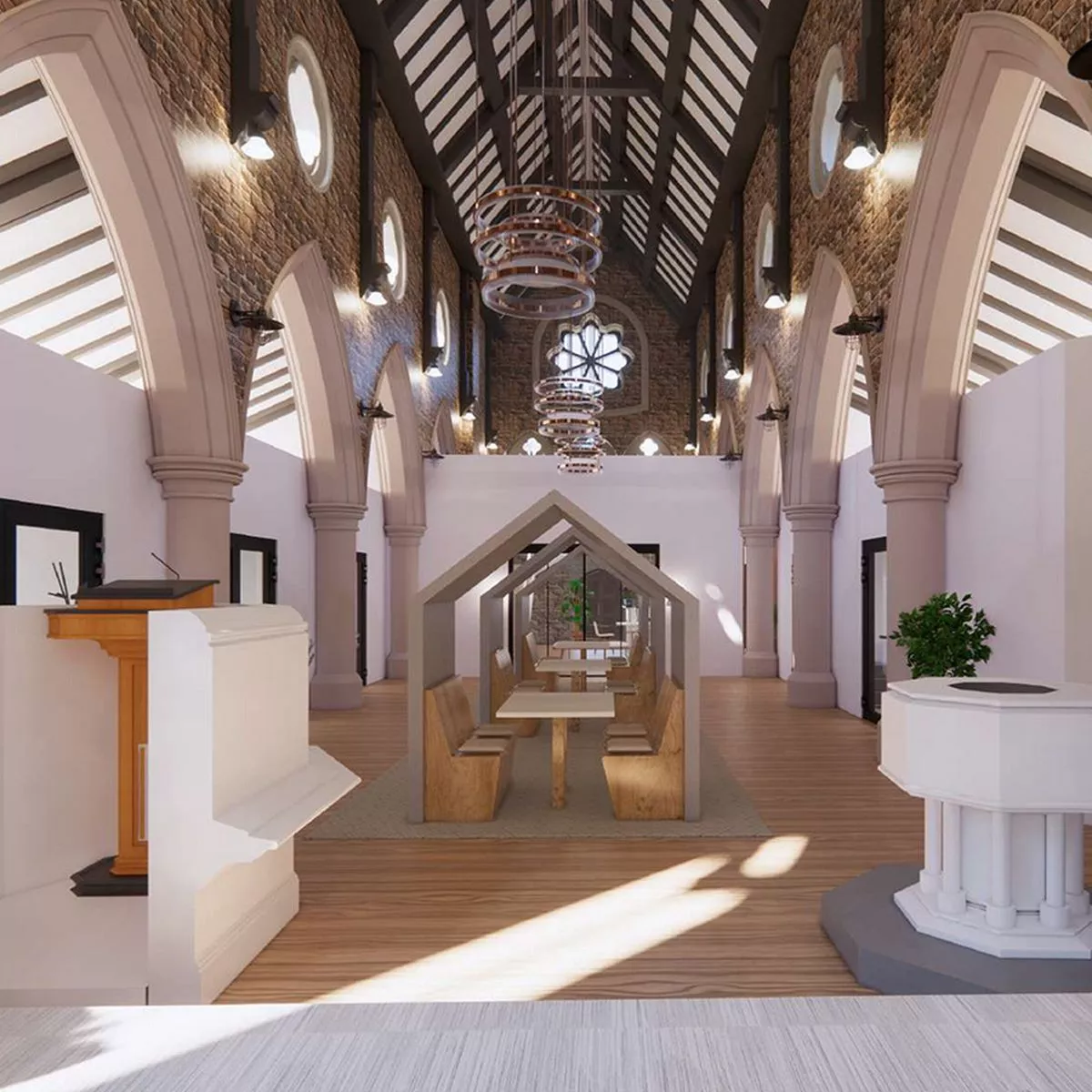
Christ Church in Bacup Redevelopment Of Nave

== Future ==
After 12 years of closure, the Church of England sold the building - for conversion into offices with a focus on digital businesses - to the owners of local digital marketing agency GrowTraffic and led by Simon Dalley.

In 2019, an offer was agreed with the Church of England to create a digital and technology centre at the building. When discussing the building's use as a digital and tech centre, the Rt Revd Dr David Walker, Bishop of Manchester, said it would “not only provide new employment opportunities but will also make available some communal areas for community purposes”. Planning permission was granted for this redevelopment in April 2023. The acquisition of the building was completed on 22 November 2024.

The former Christ Church building has been redeveloped as Rossendale's first digital and technology hub and is now known as Rossendale Digital Bacup Campus.

== See also ==
- Listed buildings in Bacup
- List of works by Sharpe and Paley
