= Stubbylee Hall =

Municipal building in Bacup, Lancashire, England

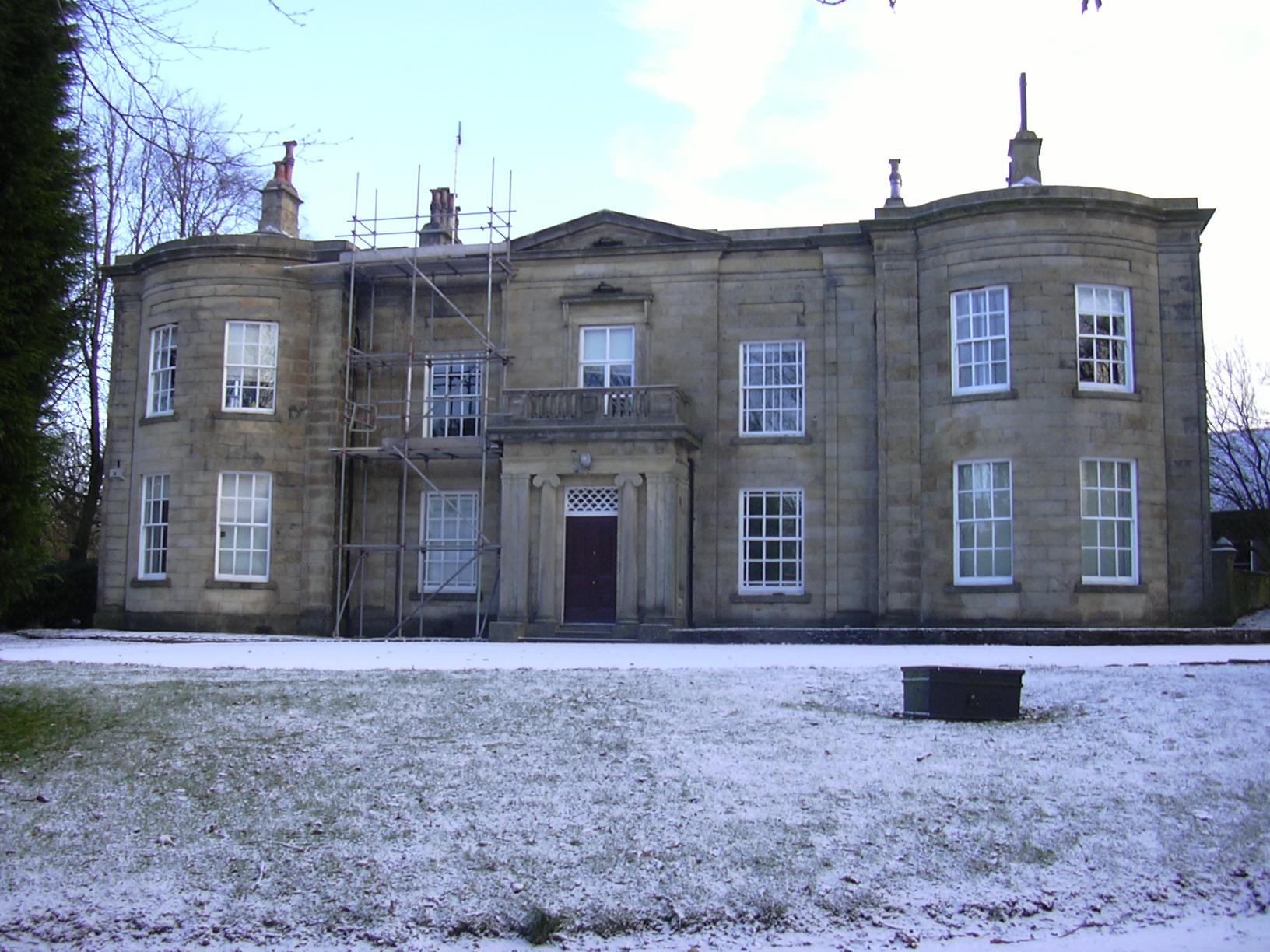
- The building in 2010

- Shown in Lancashire
- 53.6928°N 2.2032°W
- Location: Stubbylee Lane, Bacup

History
- Built: 1808

Site notes
- Architectural style: Neoclassical style

Listed Building – Grade II
- Official name: Stubbylee Hall
- Designated: 18 June 1968
- Reference no.: 1163375

Stubbylee Hall, formerly known as Bacup Town Hall, is a former municipal building in Stubbylee Lane in Bacup, a town in Lancashire in England. The building, which served as the offices and meeting place of Bacup Borough Council, is a Grade II listed building.

== History ==
The building was commissioned as a private house by the Holt family, in the early 19th century. The senior member of the family at that time was James Holt, a local baize manufacturer. It was designed in the neoclassical style built in ashlar stone and was completed in 1808. It was enlarged in 1872, under the ownership of the member of parliament, James Maden Holt.

Following significant population growth, largely associated with textile manufacturing, a local board of health was established in Bacup in 1863. The area was then incorporated as a municipal borough in 1882. The borough council initially established a council chamber and an office for the town clerk in the market hall on the corner of Bank Street and Lord Street.

In 1914, Stubbylee Hall was purchased by Bacup Borough Council, using money donated by Miles Ashworth. Ashworth was the first President of the Rochdale Equitable Pioneers Society. In accordance with Ashworth's wishes, the grounds of the hall were laid out as a public park, and the house was converted for municipal purposes. The town hall continued to serve as the headquarters of the borough council for much of the 20th century, and remained the meeting place for the enlarged Rossendale Borough Council which was formed in 1974.

In the early 2000s, the council moved to Hardman's Mill in Rawtenstall, and the hall was left vacant. A stag's head which for many years had been on display in the hall was recovered from storage and returned to its original place on the staircase in 2006. In August 2018, Valley Heritage was contracted to identify potential future uses for the building.

== Architecture ==
The two-storey hall is built of sandstone, with a slate roof. It is in the neoclassical style, and has a symmetrical five-bay front, with the outermost bays slightly projecting as curved wings. The centre bay is also slightly projected forward, and features a porch formed by Ionic order pilasters supporting an entablature and a balcony. The centre bay incorporates a French door on the first floor, while the curved wings are fenestrated by sash windows. Inside, there is a stone staircase under a moulded plaster ceiling, with a domed skylight incorporating stained glass. Early furnishings in the building include cupboards and built-in bookcases. The building was grade II listed in 1968.

== See also ==
- Listed buildings in Bacup
