= Elgin Street, Bacup =

Street in Bacup, Lancashire, England

Elgin Street
Lancashire
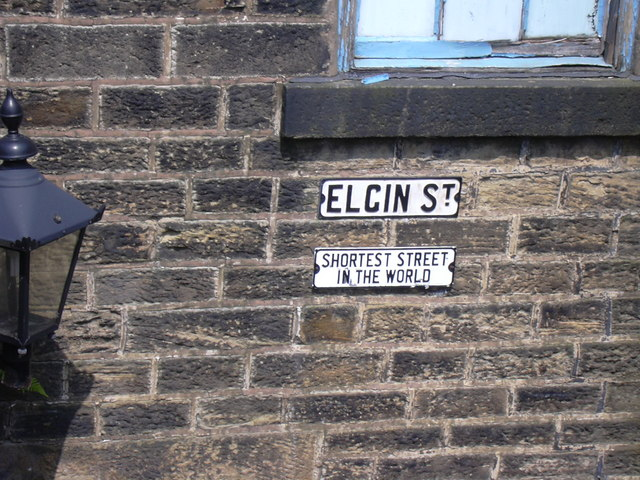
- Elgin Street (photo from June 2007)
- Interactive map of Elgin Street
- Length: 17 ft (5.2 m)
- Postal code: OL13 8GS
- Coordinates: 53.70270°N 2.20172°W

Elgin Street, located in Bacup, Lancashire, is one of the shortest streets in the world at 17 feet (5.2 m). It held the British record until November 2006, when it was discovered that Ebenezer Place, Wick in Caithness, Scotland, which was constructed in 1883 and named in 1887, was shorter at only 6 feet 9 inches (2.06 m) in length.

The street is reached from a walkway between Bank Street and Lord Street, but vehicular access has been cut off by the later construction of this walkway and steps. The street can be viewed from the railings above.
