= Emily Sarah Holt =

English novelist (1836–1893)

Emily Sarah Holt (1836–1893) was an English novelist. She was born at Stubbylee, Bacup, in Lancashire, 25 April 1836. She was the eldest daughter of John Holt whose wife Judith was the 3rd daughter of James Mason of Greens (who was JP for Lancashire and the West Riding). It is said she was educated at Oxford. In late 1893 when at Harrogate, she became ill and went to her brother in Balham (London), where she died on Christmas Day.

She was buried in the Church of St Saviour's, Bacup, where there is a memorial.

Holt had written over fifty books, mainly for children. Most of Holt's work can be classified as historical novels (52 are listed in the BML catalogue). Holt's work has a Protestant religious theme.

== Works ==
Novels unless otherwise stated

- Memoirs Of Royal Ladies 2 volumes 1861
- Mistress Margery 1868
- Ashcliffe Hall 1870
- Sister Rose 1870
- Isoult Barry Of Wynscote, Her Diurnal Book 1871
- Robin Tremayne 1872
- The Well In The Desert 1872
- Verena non-fiction 1873
- The White Rose Of Langley 1875
- Clare Avery 1876
- Imogen 1876
- For The Master's Sake 1877
- Lettice Eden 1877
- Margery's Son 1878
- Lady Sybil's Choice 1879
- Earl Hubert's Daughter 1880
- The Maidens' Lodge 1880
- Joyce Morrell's Harvest 1881
- At Ye Grene Griffin 1882
- Red And White 1882
- Stephen Mainwaring's Wooing, With Other Fireside Tales, (w others) (short stories) 1882
- Not For Him 1883
- The Way Of The Cross, (short stories) 1883
- John De Wycliffe, The First Of The Reformers, biography 1884
- Ye Olden Time, non-fiction 1884
- The Lord Mayor 1884
- Wearyholme 1884
- The Lord Of The Marches 1884
- A Tangled Web 1885
- 'Feed My Sheep' non-fiction 1886
- In All Time Of Our Tribulation, fiction 1887
- All For The Best 1887
- The Slave Girl Of Pompeii 1887
- Our Little Lady 1887
- Out In The Forty-Five 1888
- In Convent Walls 1888
- King And Priest, non-fiction 1888
- The Pulpit And The Pews, non-fiction 1888
- A Talk With The Vicar, non-fiction 1888
- The King's Daughters 1888
- It Might Have Been 1889
- Minster Lovel 1890
- Behind The Veil 1890
- The White Lady Of Hazelwood 1891
- Countess Maud 1892
- One Snowy Night 1893
- The Harvest Of Yesterday 1893
- Princess Adelaide 1893
- All's Well 1893
- The Priest On His Throne, And The Priests At Their Altars, essays 1894
- Through The Storm 1895
- The Gold That Glitters 1896
- Lights In The Darkness biography 1896
