= David Crosley =

English Baptist minister

David Crosley or Crosly (1670–1744) was an English Particular Baptist minister; serving both as an Evangelist and a Pastor over the course of his life.

== Life ==
Crosley was born in the neighbourhood of Todmorden, Lancashire, and was brought up by a religiously-inclined aunt. While still young he worked as a stonemason at Walsden, preaching at night. He met John Bunyan, and lived an itinerant life.

In 1691 Crosley preached a sermon at Mr. Pomfret's meeting-house in Spitalfields. Early in the following year he was at Bacup, Lancashire, where a meeting-house was built for him and his cousin, William Mitchell, and a few months later he was (according to Joseph Ivimey) baptised at Bromsgrove, Worcestershire, and formally called to the ministry on 26 August 1692. He then returned to Bacup, but in May 1695 was appointed minister of a congregation at Tottlebank, near Lancaster.

In 1705 Crosley moved to London as pastor of the Particular Baptist church, Curriers' Hall, London Wall, founded by Hanserd Knollys. Subsequently (before 1718) retiring into Lancashire, he was followed by reports of indiscretions committed in the metropolis. A reputation of "notorious immorality" clung to him, and caused his expulsion from communion by the Yorkshire and Lancashire Baptist Association. In time he lived down the scandal.

Crosley lived at Hapton, near Padiham, and subsequently at Goodshaw, where in his old age he kept a school. He was reputed "one of the largest men in the county". His discourse on Britliffe was preached, when he was 72, to an open-air audience of four thousand people. He died at Goodshaw in August or September 1744, in his seventy-fifth year. He was succeeded in the pastorate of the Curriers' Hall, Cripplegate, by John Skepp.

== Works ==
In 1696 Crosley edited and published The Old Man's Legacy to his Daughters, by N. T., which he reprinted in 1736, with a few additional pages of his own. In 1720 he published a poem entitled Adam, where art Thou? or the Serious Parley; and in 1743, The Triumph of Sovereign Grace, or a Brand Pluckt out of the Fire (Manchester, pp. 127), the substance of a discourse occasioned by the execution of Laurence Britliffe of Cliviger. In 1744 he republished his sermon Samson, a Type of Christ, with the addition of a discourse on marriage, and a preface by George Whitefield, with whom he conducted a correspondence in his later years. A third edition was printed in 1851.

== Bibliography ==
- David Crosley (1796) [1744]. Samson a Type of Christ. Being a sermon preached in London, July the 28th, 1691. at a morning lecture: upon Judges XIV. 5 (3 ed.). William Barrett.
- David Crosley (24 April 2018). The Triumph of Sovereign Grace Or a Brand Pluckt Out of the Fire: Being the Substance of a Funeral Discourse, Preached at Bacop, May 23. 1742. ... on Occasion of the Death of Lau. Britliffe, ... Who Was Executed at Lancaster. Creative Media Partners, LLC. ISBN 978-1-385-52051-2.

== Notes ==
Attribution

This article incorporates text from a publication now in the public domain: Stephen, Leslie, ed. (1888). "Crosly, David". Dictionary of National Biography. Vol. 13. London: Smith, Elder & Co.
