= Bacup =

Town in Lancashire, England

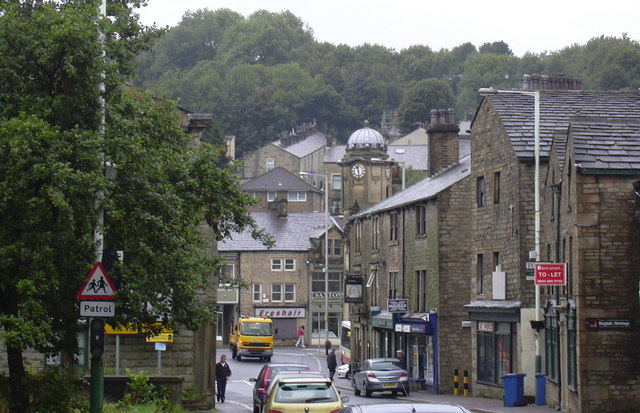
- Yorkshire Street in Bacup, 2008

- Shown within Rossendale Location within Lancashire
- Population: 13,323 (2011 census)
- OS grid reference: SD868231
  - London: 175 mi (282 km) SSE
- District: Rossendale
- Shire county: Lancashire
- Region: North West
- Country: England
- Sovereign state: United Kingdom
- Post town: BACUP
- Postcode district: OL13
- Dialling code: 01706
- Police: Lancashire
- Fire: Lancashire
- Ambulance: North West
- UK Parliament: Rossendale and Darwen

Bacup (/ˈbeɪkəp/ BAY-kəp, /ˈbeɪkʊp/) is a town in the Rossendale Borough in Lancashire, England, in the South Pennines close to Lancashire's boundaries with West Yorkshire and Greater Manchester. The town is in the Rossendale Valley and the upper Irwell Valley, 4 miles (6.4 km) east of Rawtenstall, 6 miles (9.7 km) north of Rochdale, and 7 miles (11 km) south of Burnley. At the 2011 Census, Bacup had a population of 13,323.

Bacup emerged as a settlement following the Anglo-Saxon settlement of Britain in the Early Middle Ages. For centuries, it was a small and obscure centre of domestic flannel and woollen cloth production, and many of the original weavers' cottages survive today as listed buildings. Following the Industrial Revolution, Bacup became a mill town, growing up around the now covered over bridge crossing the River Irwell and the north–south / east-west crossroad at its centre. During that time its landscape became dominated by distinctive and large rectangular woollen and cotton mills. Bacup received a charter of incorporation in 1882, giving it municipal borough status and its own elected town government, consisting of a mayor, aldermen and councillors to oversee local affairs.

In 1974, Bacup became part of the borough of Rossendale. Bacup's historic character, culture and festivities have encouraged the town to be seen as one of the best preserved mill towns in England. English Heritage has proclaimed Bacup town centre as a designated protected area for its special architectural qualities.

== History ==
The name Bacup is derived from the Old English fūlbæchop. The Oxford Dictionary of British Place Names translates this as "muddy valley by a ridge"; the fūl- element, which meant "foul" or "muddy" was used in the earliest known reference to the area, in a charter by Robert de Lacey, around the year 1200, as used in the Middle English spelling fulebachope. The prefix ful- was dropped from the toponym. The -bæchop element is less clear, possibly meaning "ridge valley", or else "back valley" referring to the locale's position at the back part of the Irwell Valley.

Bacup and its hinterland has provided archeological evidence of human activity in the area during the Neolithic. Anglo-Saxons settled in the Early Middle Ages. It has been claimed that in the 10th century the Anglo-Saxons battled against Gaels and Norsemen at Broadclough, a village to the north of Bacup. From the medieval period in this area, the River Irwell separated the ancient parishes of Whalley and Rochdale (in the hundreds of Blackburn and Salford respectively). The settlement developed mainly in the Whalley township of Newchurch but extending into Rochdale's Spotland.

The geology and topography of the village lent itself to urbanisation and domestic industries; primitive weavers' cottages, coal pits and stone quarries were propelled by Bacup's natural supply of water power in the Early Modern period. The adoption of the factory system, which developed into the Industrial Revolution, enabled the transformation of Bacup from a small rural village into a mill town, populated by an influx of families attracted by Bacup's cotton mills, civic amenities and regional railway network. Locally sourced coal provided the fuel for industrial-scale quarrying, cotton spinning and shoemaking operations, stimulating the local economy. Bacup received a charter of incorporation in 1882, giving it honorific borough status and its own elected town government, consisting of a mayor, aldermen and councillors to oversee local affairs.

Bacup's boom in textile manufacture during the Industrial Revolution resulted in the town developing into a prosperous and thickly populated industrial area by early-20th century. But the Great Depression and the ensuing deindustrialisation of the United Kingdom largely eliminated Bacup's textile processing sector and economic prosperity.

Bacup followed the regional and national trend of deindustrialisation during the early and mid-20th century; a process exacerbated by the closure of Bacup railway station in 1966. Bacup also experienced population decline; from 22,000 at the time of the United Kingdom Census 1911, to 15,000 at the United Kingdom Census 1971. Much of Bacup's infrastructure became derelict owing to urban decay, despite regeneration schemes and government funding. Shops became empty and some deteriorated. The houses along the main roads endured as the original terraces from Bacup's industrial age, but behind these, on the hillsides, are several council estates.

Records in 2005 show Bacup to have some of the lowest crime levels in the county, and the relative small change to Bacup's infrastructure and appearance has given the town a "historic character and distinctive sense of place". In 2007, the murder of Sophie Lancaster attracted media attention to the town and highlighted its urban blight and lack of amenities and regeneration.

== Regeneration ==
In 2013 it was announced that Rossendale Borough Council was successful in securing £2m funding from the Heritage Lottery Fund for a 5-year regeneration project, to be delivered by the Bacup Townscape Heritage Initiative (THI). The project focuses on the redevelopment and restoration of Bacup's unique built and cultural heritage whilst providing training in traditional building skills and to facilitate activities and events for local people. The injection of funds has significantly contributed to growing property prices in the area with the investments in the area being cited as one of the major reasons why the area is becoming increasingly attractive to people commuting to larger conurbations such as Greater Manchester.

Due to the success of the Bacup THI and following public research and consultation, in 2019 the Rossendale Borough Council announced the development of the Bacup 2040 Vision and Masterplan. Bacup 2040 sets out a new vision for Bacup, aiming to capitalise on the gains made through the THI scheme whilst redeveloping aspects of the town to make it fit for a high-street model less reliant on retail and more suited to the needs of visitors and local residents alike. In order to realise the scheme, the council considered multiple bid options and the Bacup 2040 Vision was used as the basis of its bid for a share of the £1b Future High Street Fund. The Bacup 2040 Board was established in 2019 and is made up of representatives from across Bacup, including local residents, business owners, community organisations, charities, councillors, council officers. The board is chaired by a local business owner and has 6 sub-group committees, chaired by representatives of different community organisations, reviewing the various aspects of the vision and plan. The role of the board is to "inform, challenge and validate the scope and proposals for the redevelopment of Bacup."

The Bacup 2040 plan for the £11.5m redevelopment of Bacup's core, including the Market Square, was reported on in February 2020 and later announced by the local council in June 2020.

The first stages of the commencement of the Bacup 2040 work was announced in June 2020, with the £1m redevelopment of the long-time derelict Regal Building. However, this redevelopment did not take place and the funds were used on other buildings within the town centre, sharing the benefits of this funding more broadly. It was only in 2026 that the demolition of the Regal Cinema would finally take place.

The Circle has been described as a town centre destination in recent years, particularly following Sarah Khattab taking a leading role in 2022 after partially acquiring St John's Church.

In the 2023 budget, it was announced that Rossendale would receive a grant of £17.9m, of which £8.3m would be dedicated to the Bacup Market regeneration scheme of which the Chair of the Bacup 2040 Board commented: "At the heart of Temple Court will be an innovative two-storey, brand-spanking new market hall building, designed to be bustling with life. The ground floor will be a treasure trove of local produce, crafts and a varied array of food and drink – where market days and events will come to life - and where visitors will be encouraged to relax and enjoy the surroundings, both during the day and into the evening. The upper floor will introduce a cycle hub and makers’ spaces, championing creativity and discovery."

== Governance ==
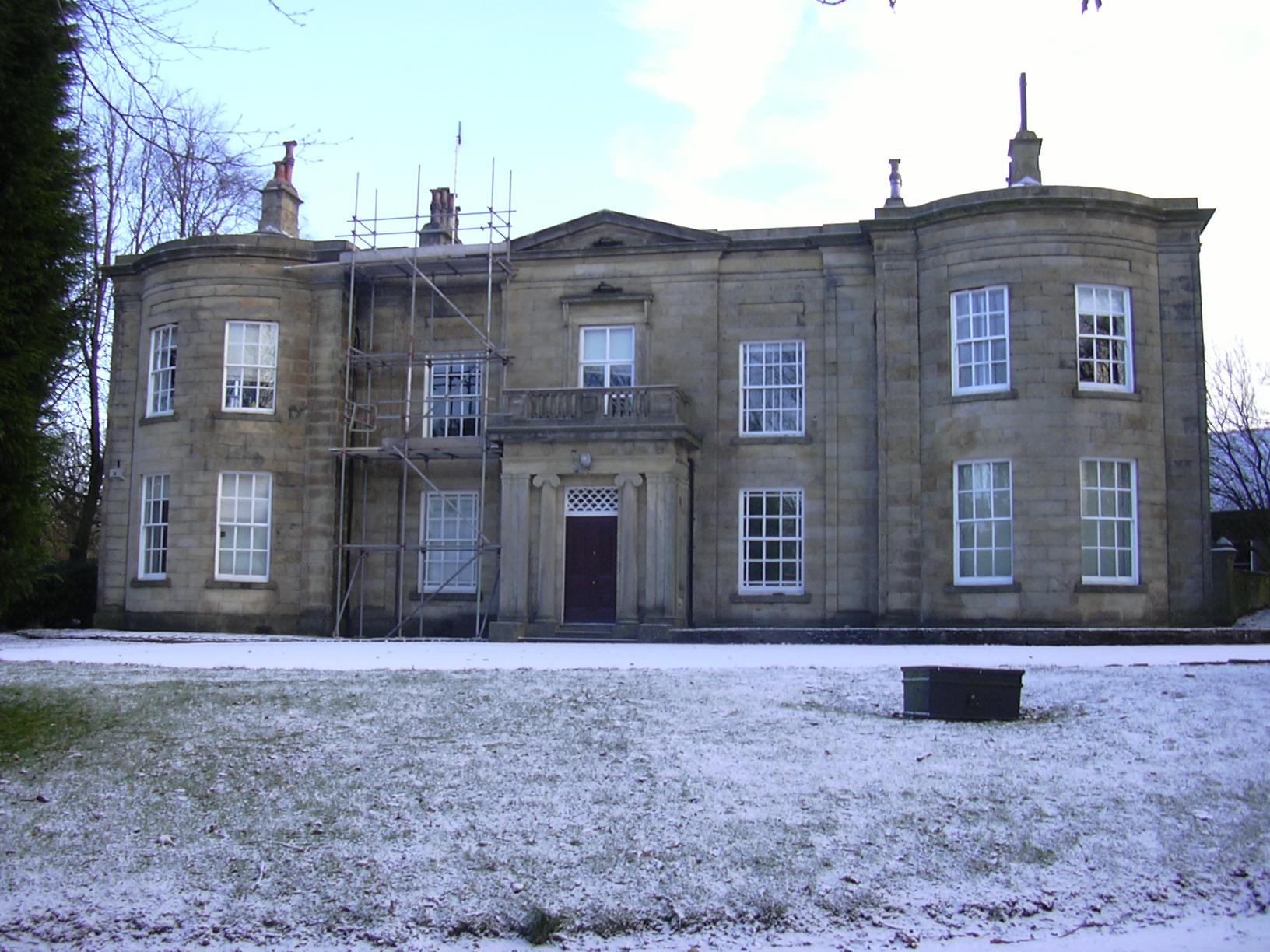
The former Bacup Town Hall

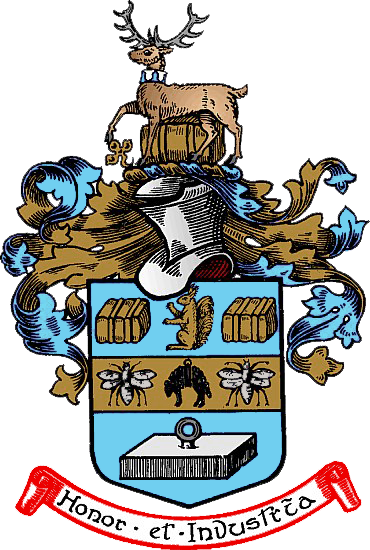
The coat of arms of the former Bacup Municipal Borough Council

Lying within the historic county boundaries of Lancashire since the High Middle Ages, Bacup was a chapelry linked with the parishes of Whalley and Rochdale, and divided between the townships of Newchurch and Spotland in the hundred of Blackburn.

Bacup's first local authority was a Local board of health established in 1863; Bacup Local Board of Health was a regulatory body responsible for standards of hygiene and sanitation in the Bacup Urban Sanitary District. The area of the sanitary authority was granted a charter of incorporation in 1882, giving it honorific borough status and its own elected town government, consisting of a mayor, aldermen and councillors to oversee local affairs. The Municipal Borough of Bacup became a local government district of the administrative county of Lancashire under the Local Government Act 1894, meaning it shared power with the strategic Lancashire County Council. The council was based at Bacup Town Hall. Under the Local Government Act 1972, the Municipal Borough of Bacup was abolished, and since 1 April 1974 Bacup has formed an unparished area of Rossendale, a local government district of the non-metropolitan county of Lancashire.

From 1992 until 2010, Bacup was represented in the House of Commons as part of the parliamentary constituency of Rossendale and Darwen, by Janet Anderson, a Labour Party Member of Parliament (MP). Bacup had previously formed part of the Rossendale constituency. In the general election of 2010, the seat was taken by Jake Berry of the Conservative Party, and in 2024 it was taken by Andy MacNae of Labour.

== Geography ==
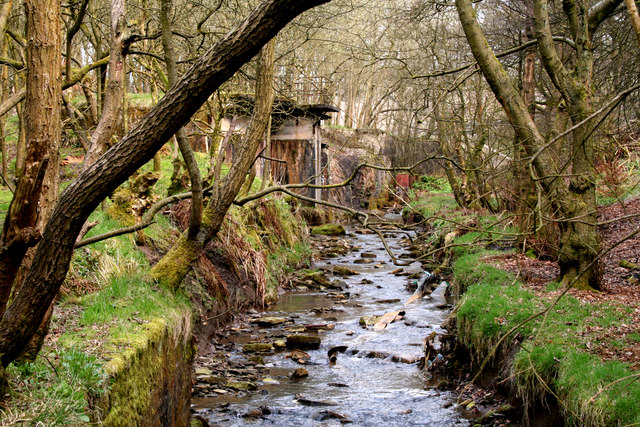
The River Irwell at Weir in the rural north of Bacup

At 53°42′14″N 2°11′56″W (53.704°, −2.199°), 15 miles (24.1 km) north-northeast of Manchester, 17 miles (27.4 km) southeast of Blackburn and 26 miles (41.8 km) southwest of Bradford. Bacup stands on the western slopes of the South Pennines, amongst the upper-Irwell Valley. The River Irwell, a 39-mile (63 km) long tributary of the River Mersey, runs southwesterly through Bacup towards Rawtenstall from its source by the town's upland outskirts at Weir. The Irwell is mostly culverted in central Bacup but it is open in the suburbs. In 2003 there was a proposal to use plate glass for a section of the culvert in the centre of the town however the culvert was eventually replaced with concrete. Bacup is roughly 1,000 feet (305 m) above sea level; the Deerplay area of Weir is 1,350 feet (411 m) above sea level; Bacup town centre is 835 feet (255 m) above sea level.

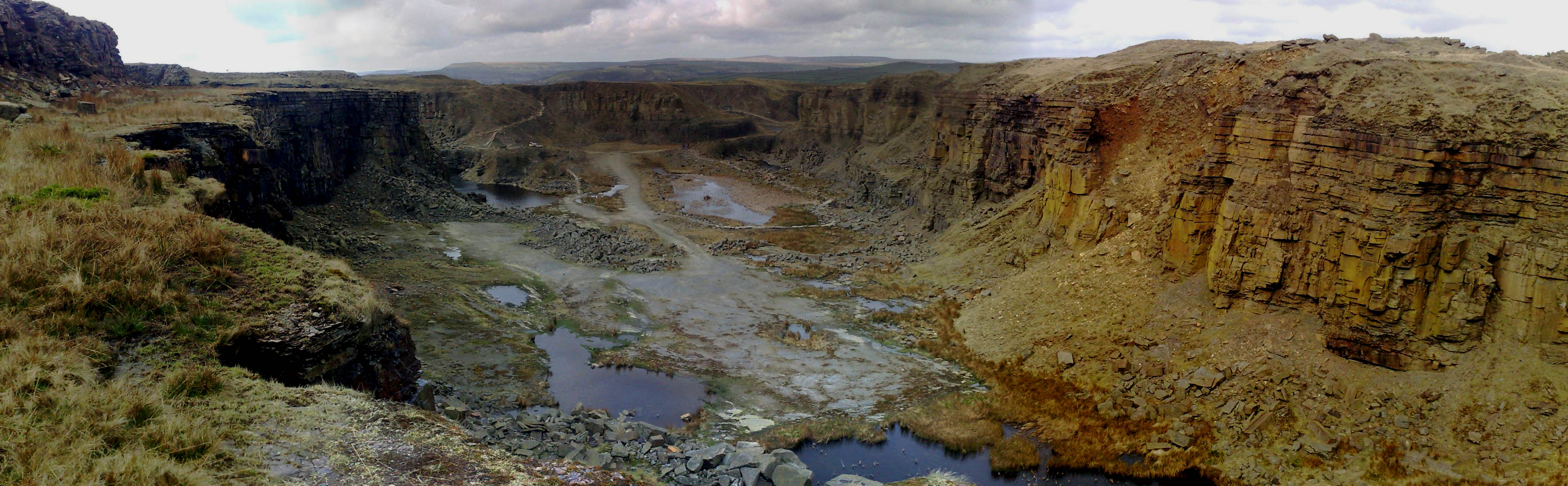
On the moor to the south is Lee Quarry, a council funded mountain bike trail.

Bacup is surrounded by open moor and grassland on all sides with the exception of Stacksteads at the west which forms a continuous urban area with Waterfoot and Rawtenstall. The towns of Burnley and Accrington are to the north and northwest respectively; Todmorden, Walsden and the county of West Yorkshire are to the east; Rochdale and the county of Greater Manchester are to the south; Rawtenstall, from where Bacup is governed, is to the west. Areas and suburbs of Bacup include Britannia, Broadclough, Deerplay, Dulesgate, Stacksteads and Weir.

Bacup experiences a temperate maritime climate, like much of the British Isles, with relatively cool summers, yet harsh winters. There is regular but generally light precipitation throughout the year.

== Economy ==
Bacup’s economy reflects its industrial heritage and ongoing transition toward a more diversified local base. While traditional textile and footwear manufacturing declined during the late 20th century, the town is now home to a range of small and medium-sized enterprises across sectors such as engineering, plastics, furniture, and e-commerce.

Modern employment sites include Futures Park and New Line Industrial Estate, which support local businesses involved in production, distribution, and services. Companies with operations in Bacup include Orthoplastics, JJO plc, Dale Print, AV.com (a subsidiary of Gear4music), and the Lancashire Sock Manufacturing Company.

Although Bacup forms part of the broader Pennine Lancashire economy, it retains a distinct local employment profile shaped by manufacturing and logistics. The workforce is concentrated in skilled trades, machine operation, and warehousing roles, reflecting the area’s stock of light industrial units and repurposed factory buildings. Business activity in the town also includes niche and specialist manufacturing, supported by regional transport links via the A681 and proximity to the M66 corridor.

== Landmarks ==
The town's former parish church is dedicated to Saint John the Evangelist. Aside from just this former church, Bacup has many other church buildings, however, most have now been repurposed or are in the process of being repurposed. The majority of Bacup's culturally significant architecture is in the Victorian period, but there are older buildings of note are Fearns Hall (1696), Forest House (1815) and the 18th-century Stubbylee Hall. The Bacup Natural History Society Museum was formed in 1878.

Bacup is home to the 17 ft (5.2 m) long Elgin Street which held the record as the shortest street in the world until November 2006, when it was surpassed by Ebenezer Place, in the Scottish Highlands.

Many of the town's historic buildings are set to be renewed in a £2m regeneration scheme.

== Transport ==
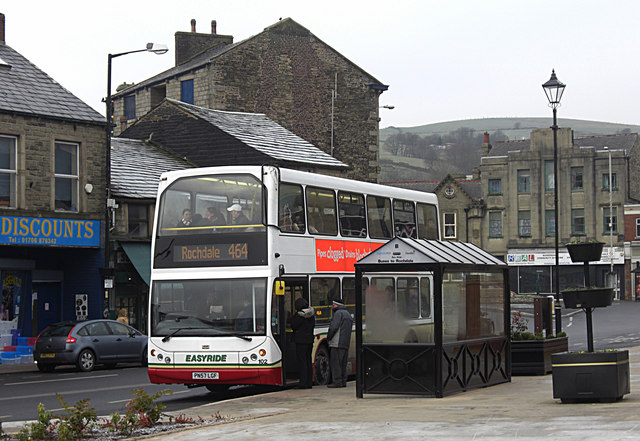
A Rosso bus in Bacup town centre

Bacup railway station was opened in 1852 by the East Lancashire Railway as the terminus of the Rossendale line. The Rochdale and Facit Railway was extended to Bacup in 1883. It rose over a summit of 967 feet (295 m) between Britannia and Shawforth. The Rochdale line closed to passenger services in 1947, and the station finally closed in December 1966, with the cessation of all passenger services to and from Manchester Victoria via Rawtenstall and Bury.

In June 2014 the police announced they would be monitoring the road between Weir and Bacup (which passes through Broadclough) as it has become an accident blackspot with a high number of accidents which have resulted in serious injury and even deaths.

=== A671 Bypass proposals ===
There have been a large number of road traffic incidents on the A671 as it passes through the small hamlets of Broadclough and Weir near Bacup including fatalities. Currently police are monitoring the road and there have been calls from local residents, led by County Councillor Jimmy Easton, for the creation of a bypass with the suggestion of utilising elements of Bacup Old Road.

== Culture and community ==
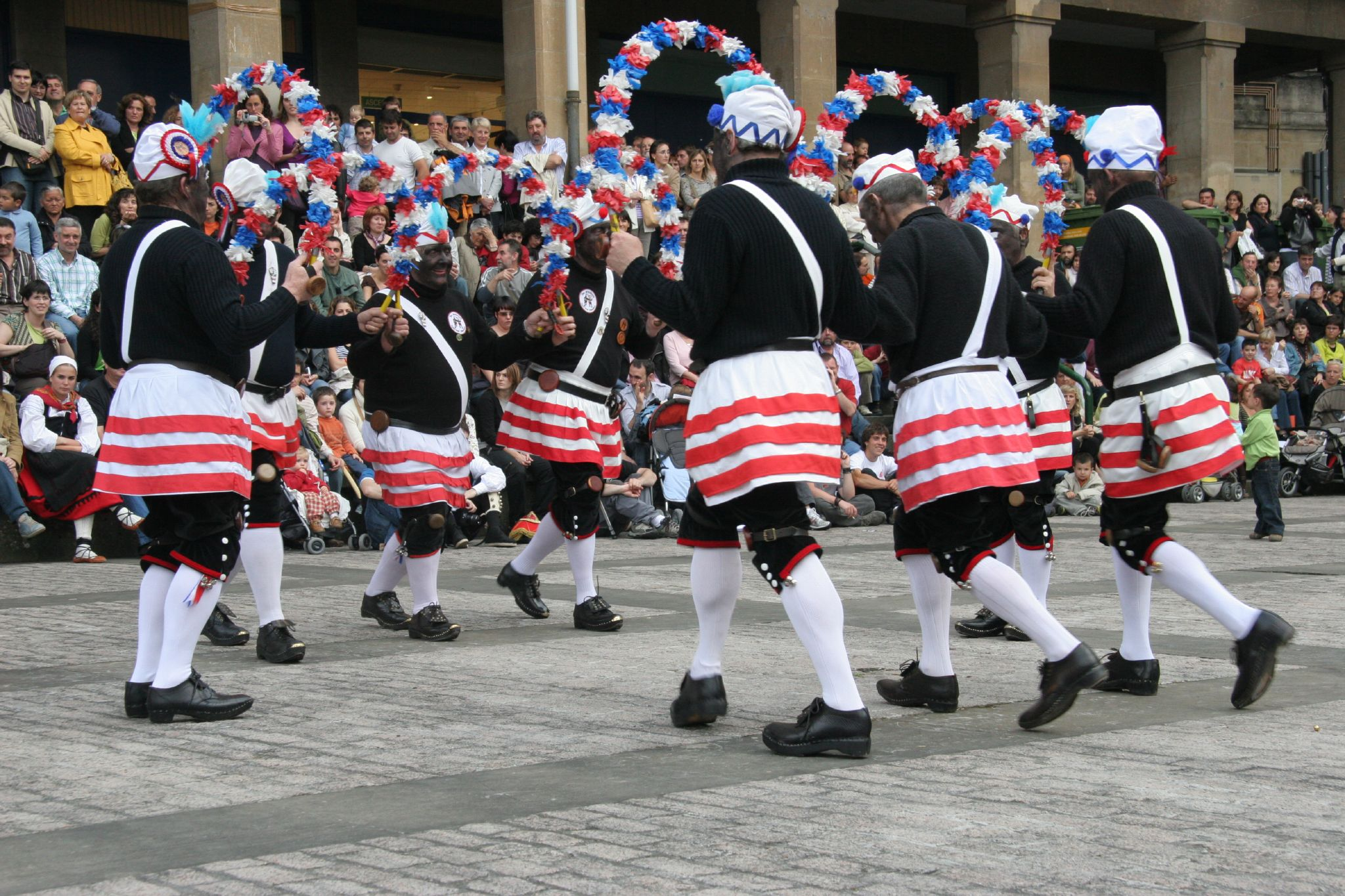
The Britannia Coconut Dancers are an English folk dance troupe based in Bacup

The key date in Bacup's cultural calendar is Easter Saturday, when the Britannia Coconut Dancers beat the bounds of the town via a dance procession. Britannia Coconut Dancers are an English country dance troupe from Bacup whose routines are steeped in local folk tradition. They wear distinctive costumes and have a custom of blackening their faces. The origin of the troupe is claimed to have its roots in Moorish, pagan, medieval, mining and Cornish customs. The Easter Saturday procession begins annually at the Traveller's Rest Public House on the A671 road. The dancers are accompanied by members of Stacksteads Silver Band and proceed to dance their way through the streets.

Bacup Museum is local history hub and exhibition centre in Bacup. The Bacup Natural History Society was formed in 1878. The work of the society is carried out by a group of volunteers who have a base in the Bacup Museum which contains many domestic, military, industrial, natural history, and religious collections.

Bacup has been used as a filming location for the 1980s BBC TV police drama Juliet Bravo, Hetty Wainthropp Investigates, parts of The League of Gentlemen and much of the film Girls' Night. Elements of the BBC TV drama Oranges Are Not the Only Fruit were also filmed on location in Bacup. The famous 1961 British film Whistle Down the Wind starring Hayley Mills also used various parts of Bacup for filming. The comedy drama Brassic was also largely filmed in Bacup.

== Media ==
Local news and television programmes are provided by BBC North West and ITV Granada. Television signals are received from the Winter Hill and local relay TV transmitters.

Local radio stations are BBC Radio Lancashire on 95.5 FM, Heart North West on 105.4 FM, Capital Manchester and Lancashire on 107.0 FM, Greatest Hits Radio Lancashire on 96.5 FM, and Rossendale Radio, a community based radio station which broadcast to the town on 104.7 FM.

The town's news in print is provided by The Rossendale Free Press, a newspaper sold in most local retail outlets and nearby communities throughout the Rossendale Valley. The paper's website closed in 2023 and the publication's online news is now provided on Lancs Live. A less widely available local printed newspaper that includes Bacup coverage and which still does maintain a /website is the Lancashire Telegraph.

The Sky TV comedy Brassic is partly filmed in Bacup.

== Notable people ==
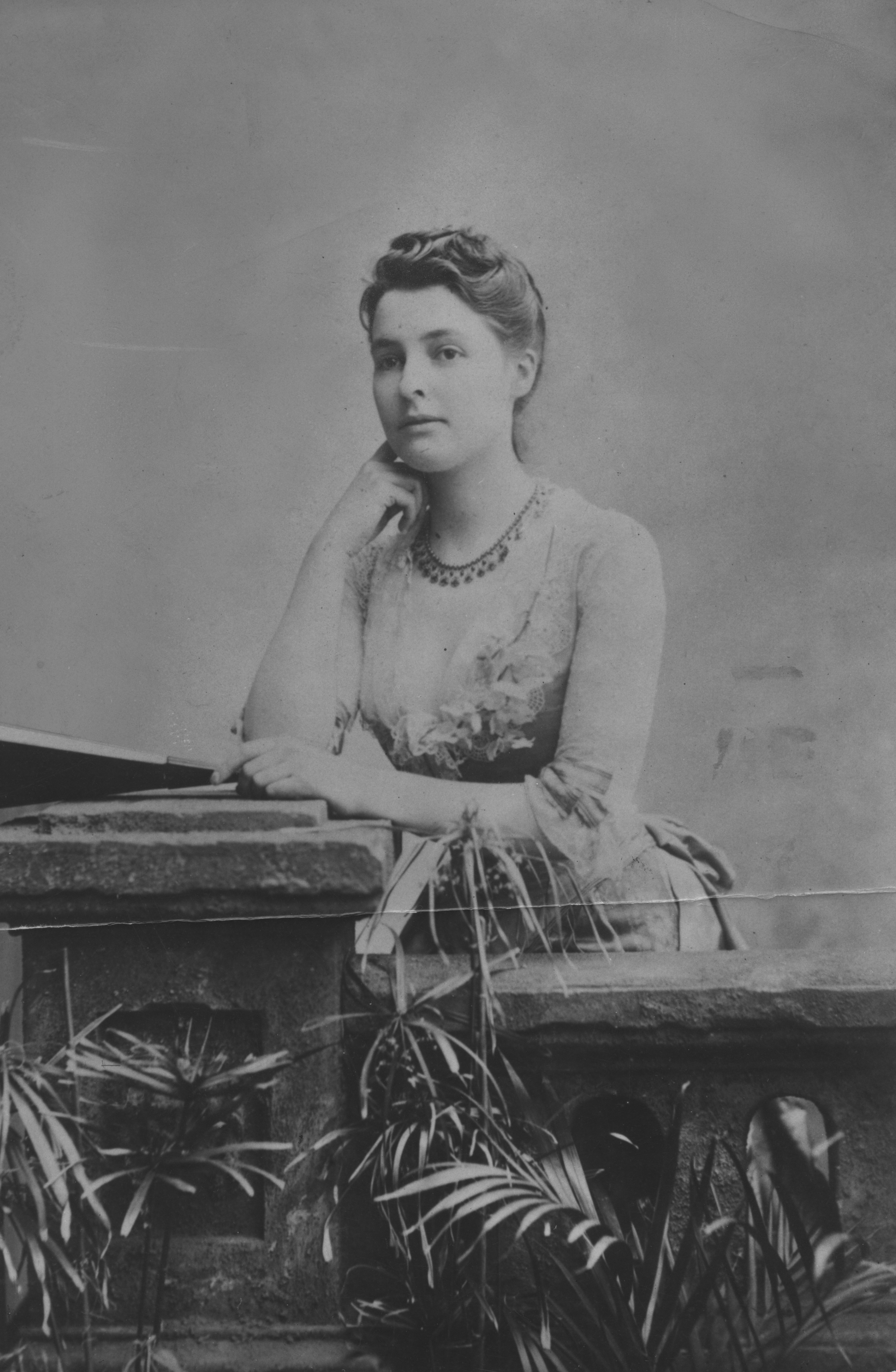
Beatrice Webb, ca.1875

- David Crosley (1670–1744), an English Particular Baptist minister, lived locally.
- Lawrence Heyworth (1786–1872), Member of Parliament for Derby 1852 / 1857 and Radical activist
- Isaac Hoyle (1828–1911), British mill-owner and MP for Heywood 1885 / 1892
- Emily Sarah Holt (1836–1893), she wrote children's historical fiction
- John B. Sutcliffe (1853–1913), English-American architect
- William Henry Carr (1855–1953), a trade unionist and political activist.
- Beatrice Webb (1858–1943), English sociologist, economist, socialist, labour historian and social reformer. She lived amongst textile factory workers in Bacup in the 1880s.
- Sir John Maden (1862–1920), Liberal Party politician, MP for Rossendale, 1892–1900
- Herbert Bolton (1863–1936), palaeontologist; director of Bristol Museum and Art Gallery, 1911–1930
- Leslie Howarth (1911–2001), mathematician who dealt with hydrodynamics and aerodynamics.
- Betty Jackson (born 1949), fashion designer; her father owned a shoe factory in town.
- Johnny Clegg (1953–2019), South African musician from the bands Juluka and Savuka
- Sir Paul Stephenson (born 1953), Metropolitan Police Commissioner, 2009 to 2011
- Jennie McAlpine (born 1984), actress, plays Fiz Brown in Coronation Street
- Sophie Lancaster (1986–2007), murder victim
- Sam Aston (born 1993), actor who plays Chesney Brown in Coronation Street

=== Sport ===
- Dick Howorth (1909–1980), cricketer who played 372 First-class cricket matches
- Eddie Cooper (1915–1968), cricketer, right-handed batsman who played 249 first-class matches for Worcestershire
- Vince Broderick (1920–2010), cricketer who played in 253 First-class cricket matches
- John Kelly (1922–1979), cricketer who played in 259 First-class cricket matches
- Everton Weekes (1925–2020), Barbadian cricketer, lived in Bacup and played for Bacup Cricket club between 1949 and 1958
- Marc Pugh (born 1987), association footballer with over 470 club caps, including 274 for AFC Bournemouth.
- Matty James (born 1991), footballer for Wrexham with over 300 domestic league caps
- Reece James (born 1993), footballer for Rotherham United with over 220 domestic league caps

== See also ==
- Listed buildings in Bacup
