= Weir, Lancashire =

Village in Lancashire, England

Coordinates: 53.723°N 2.197°W

Weir
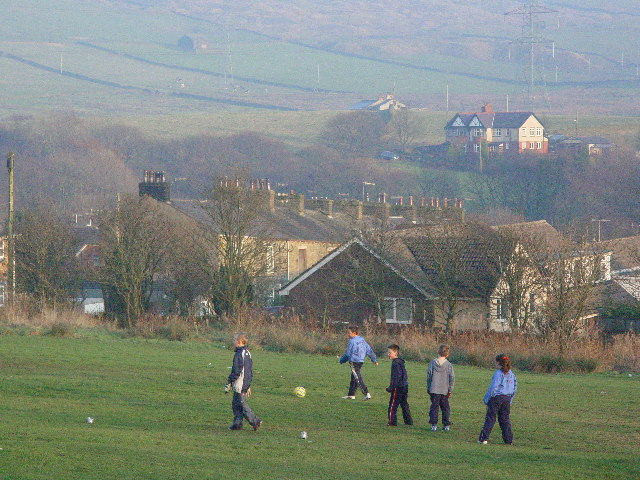
- Children playing on Weir Park

- Location within Rossendale Location within Lancashire
- OS grid reference: SD870252
- District: Rossendale
- Shire county: Lancashire
- Region: North West
- Country: England
- Sovereign state: United Kingdom
- Post town: BACUP
- Postcode district: OL13
- Dialling code: 01706
- Police: Lancashire
- Fire: Lancashire
- Ambulance: North West
- UK Parliament: Rossendale and Darwen

Weir is a village to the north of Bacup in the Rossendale borough of Lancashire, England, and immediately south of the boundary with the Borough of Burnley. The village had a population of 1,251 at the 2011 Census. Anciently, Weir constituted a hamlet, but later emerged as an outlying suburb of Bacup town after the Burnley Road turnpike was built through the settlement at the end of the 18th Century.

== Village ==
Weir straddles the A671 road and is located by Deerplay Moor, the source of the River Irwell, and adjacent to the parish of Cliviger. Weir is serviced by Northern Primary School in Broadclough, has a church and community centre (the Doals Centre), an award-winning cafe-bar (Anna's), and a Riding Centre (Weir Riding Centre). Weir was previously serviced by two pubs, the Weir Hotel and the New Deerplay in nearby Cliviger (once the 12th highest pub in England at 1,310 ft). These pubs are set to become business and residential developments.

Weir has an active voluntary group, Weir Pride, which holds monthly meetings and arranges litter picks, floral displays and planting around the village, as well as organising community activities and an annual village fete.

Weir has a football team named A.F.C. Weir, formed in 2010, who compete in the Burnley Miners Burnley and District Sunday league. Their highest finish was second in the 2013/14 season. They also won the Harry Briggs memorial trophy that season, beating Craven 4–0 with two goals each from Luke Dempsey and Ryan Nuttall, Weir goalkeeper Stewart haslam picked up man of the match. They play their home games at Towneley Playing Fields.

There have been several attempts to further develop Weir. The land on the boundary of Weir, adjacent to Broadclough Farm has had several attempts at development including a 61 home plan as well as an 80-bed residential care unit. However to date these have been refused the main concern being loss of the open moorland and countryside surrounding the village.

In June 2014 the police announced they would be monitoring the road between Weir and Bacup (passing through Broadclough) as it had become an accident blackspot.

== Politics ==
It is part of the Rossendale and Darwen constituency, with Andy MacNae having been the Member of Parliament since 2024.

== Notable people ==
Michael Carr, a Liberal Democrat politician and former Member of Parliament for the Ribble Valley, is a resident of Weir.

== Gallery ==
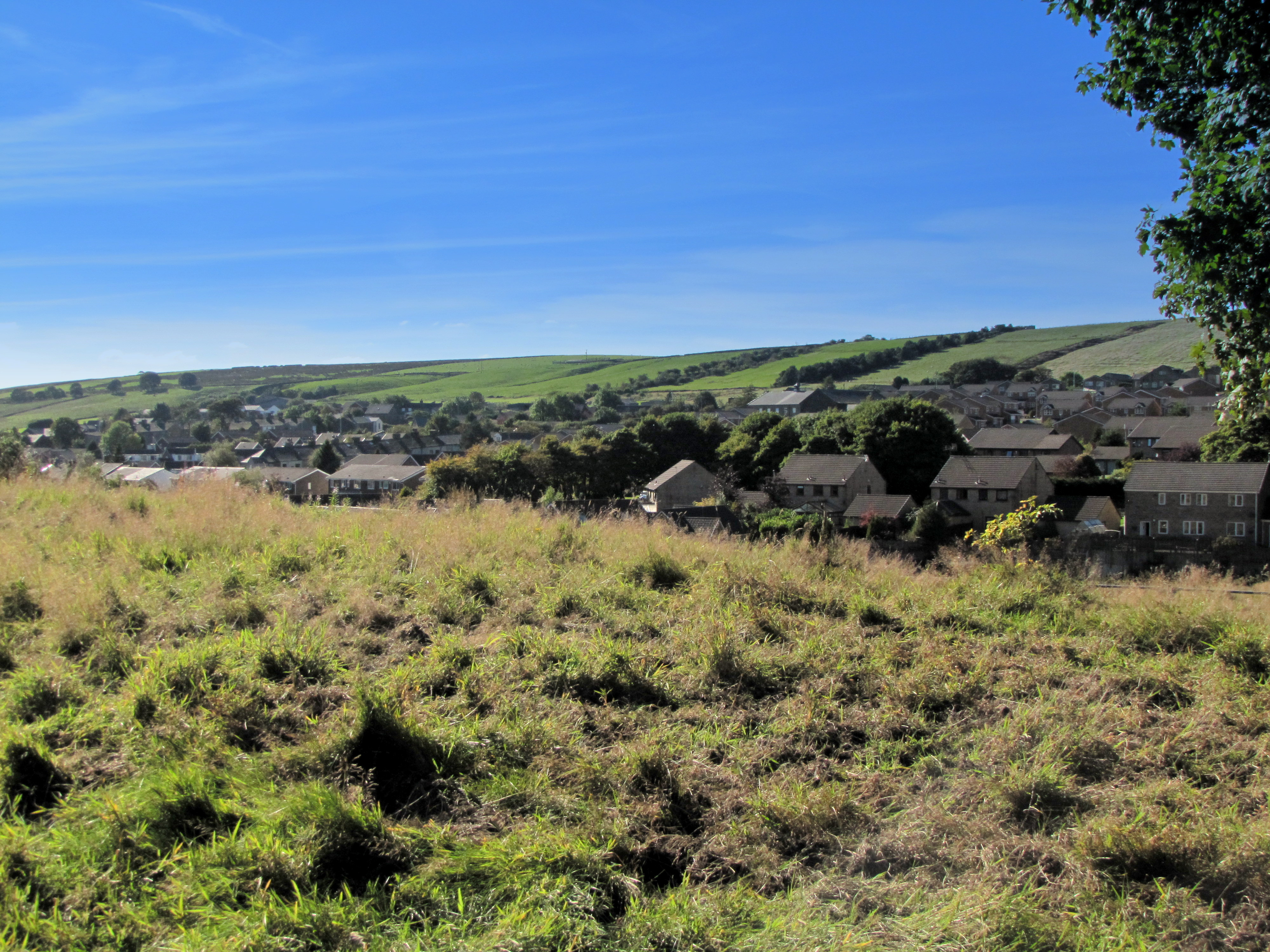
View over Weir

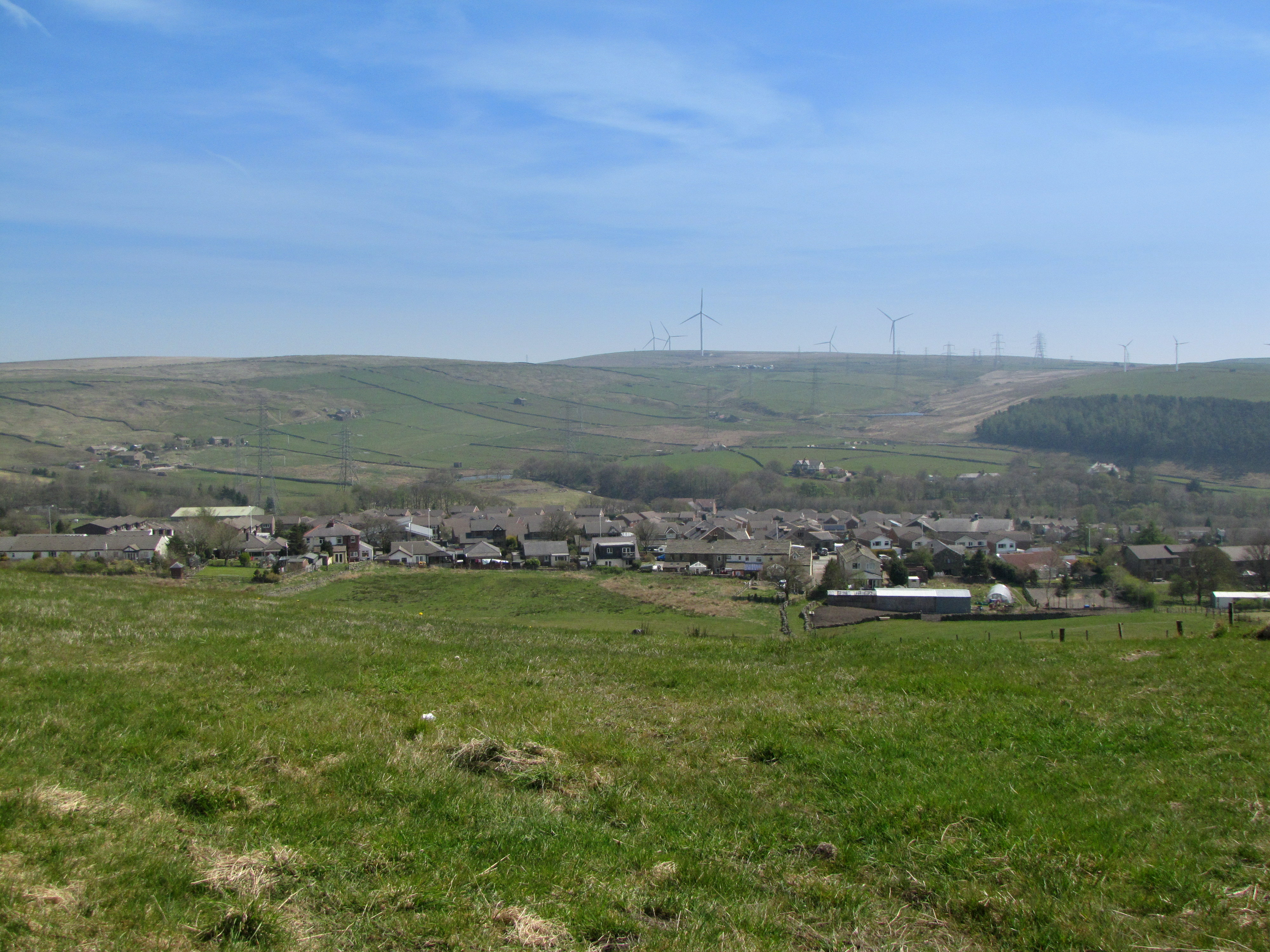
View over Weir

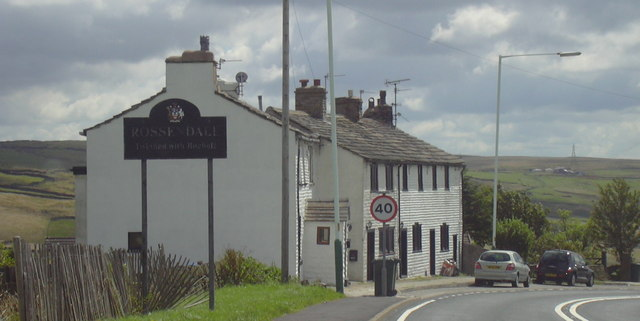
Approaching Weir from Burnley

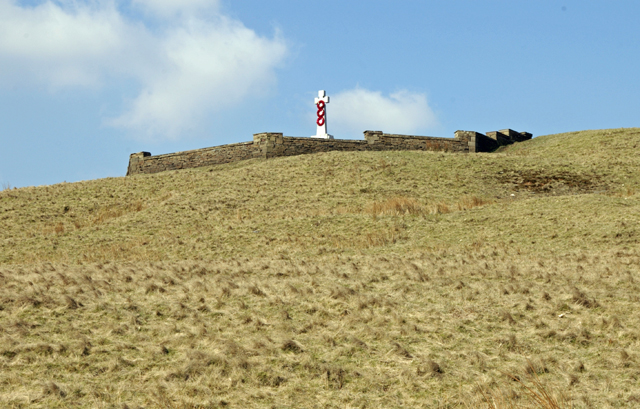
Weir War Memorial, Deerplay Moor

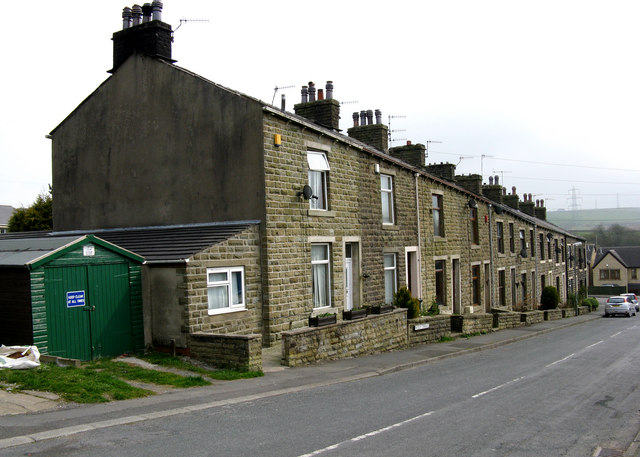
Traditional housing in Weir

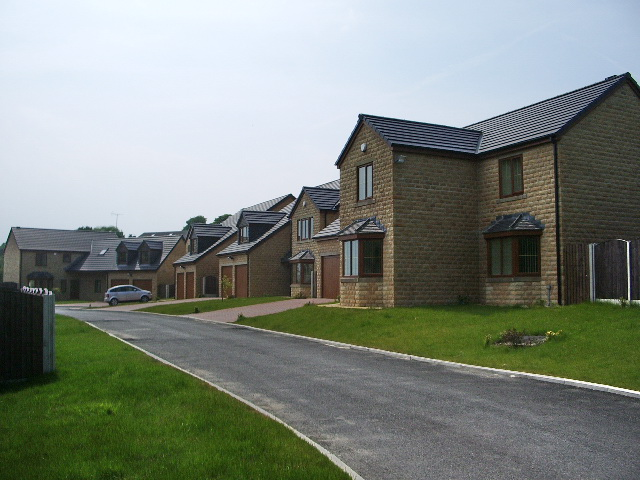
Modern housing in Weir
