= A671 road =

Road in England

A671

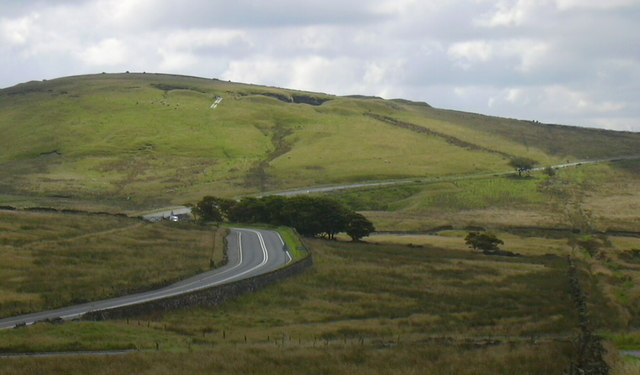
- A671 from Burnley to Bacup

Route information
- Length: 35 mi (56 km)

Major junctions
- South end: Oldham; 53.5384°N 2.1162°W
- North end: Worston; 53.8763°N 2.3596°W

Location
- Country: United Kingdom
- Primary destinations: Rochdale; Burnley

Road network
- Roads in the United Kingdom; Motorways; A and B road zones

The A671 is a road in the North West of England, that runs between Oldham, Greater Manchester and Worston, near Clitheroe, Lancashire. Major towns on the route include Rochdale and Burnley. The road is approximately 35 miles (56 km) long. Between Burnley and the A59, the A671 has primary status.

The section of road between Burnley and Whalley has been identified as one of the UK's ten most dangerous roads, with 48 serious or fatal collisions between 2000 and 2005.

== Route ==
The southern end of the road, formerly part of the A627, was the main route from Oldham to Rochdale until it was bypassed by the A627(M) motorway in 1972.

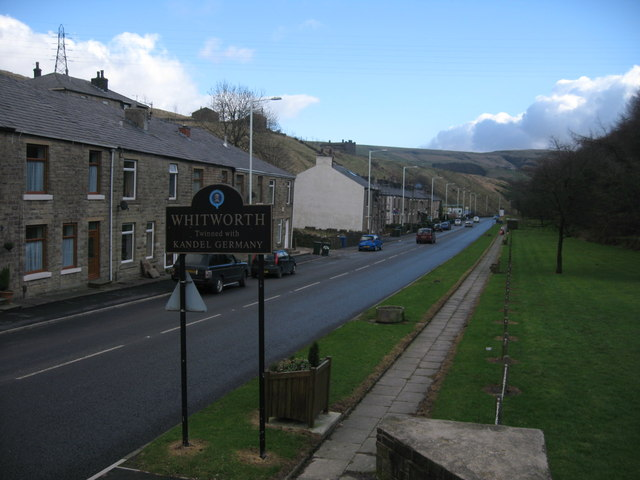
Entering Whitworth

Between Rochdale and Bacup, the road passes through the small town of Whitworth. The 3-mile (4.8 km) section through the town is called Market Street, and has several speed cameras as well as being the scene of a number of accidents.

The road passes through the centre of Bacup, where it crosses the A681. It then processes through Broadclough and Weir before going over Deerplay Moor. It later crosses the A646 before reaching Burnley. North of Burnley the A671 is a primary road. There is a junction with the M65 motorway (junction 10) before the road passes through Padiham, a small town within the borough of Burnley. The A671 forms the main street through the town. Beyond Padiham is a stretch of the road known as the Devils Elbow, near the village of Read. Further to the north-west there is the junction with the A680.

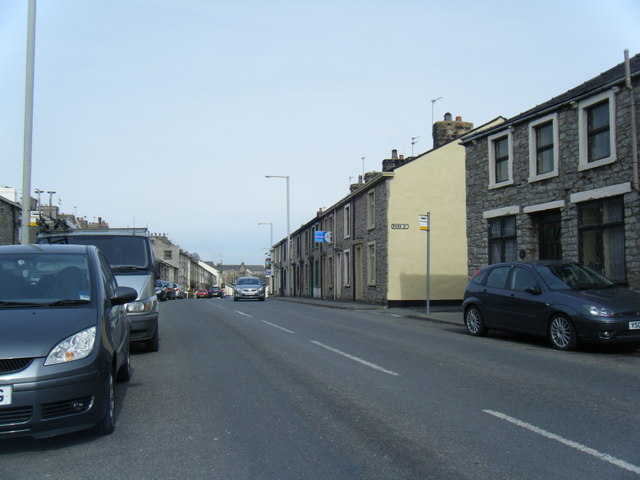
Whalley Road, Clitheroe

The road then bypasses Whalley, and ends at a roundabout, joining the A59 near Barrow. 2 miles (3.2 km) further north-east, the road leaves the A59. This section of the A671 is non-primary and forms a loop through the town of Clitheroe, which is bypassed by the A59 to the south and east of the town. It heads to the north through Clitheroe, and heads east as it leaves the town, terminating at another junction with the A59 again near Worston.

== Bypass Proposals ==
There have been a large number of fatal road traffic incidents on the A671 as it passes through the small hamlets of Broadclough and Weir near Bacup. Currently police are monitoring the road and there have been calls from local residents, led by County Councillor Jimmy Easton, for the creation of a bypass with the suggestion of utilising elements of the old highway Bacup Old Road.
