= Garland dance =

Traditional English dance

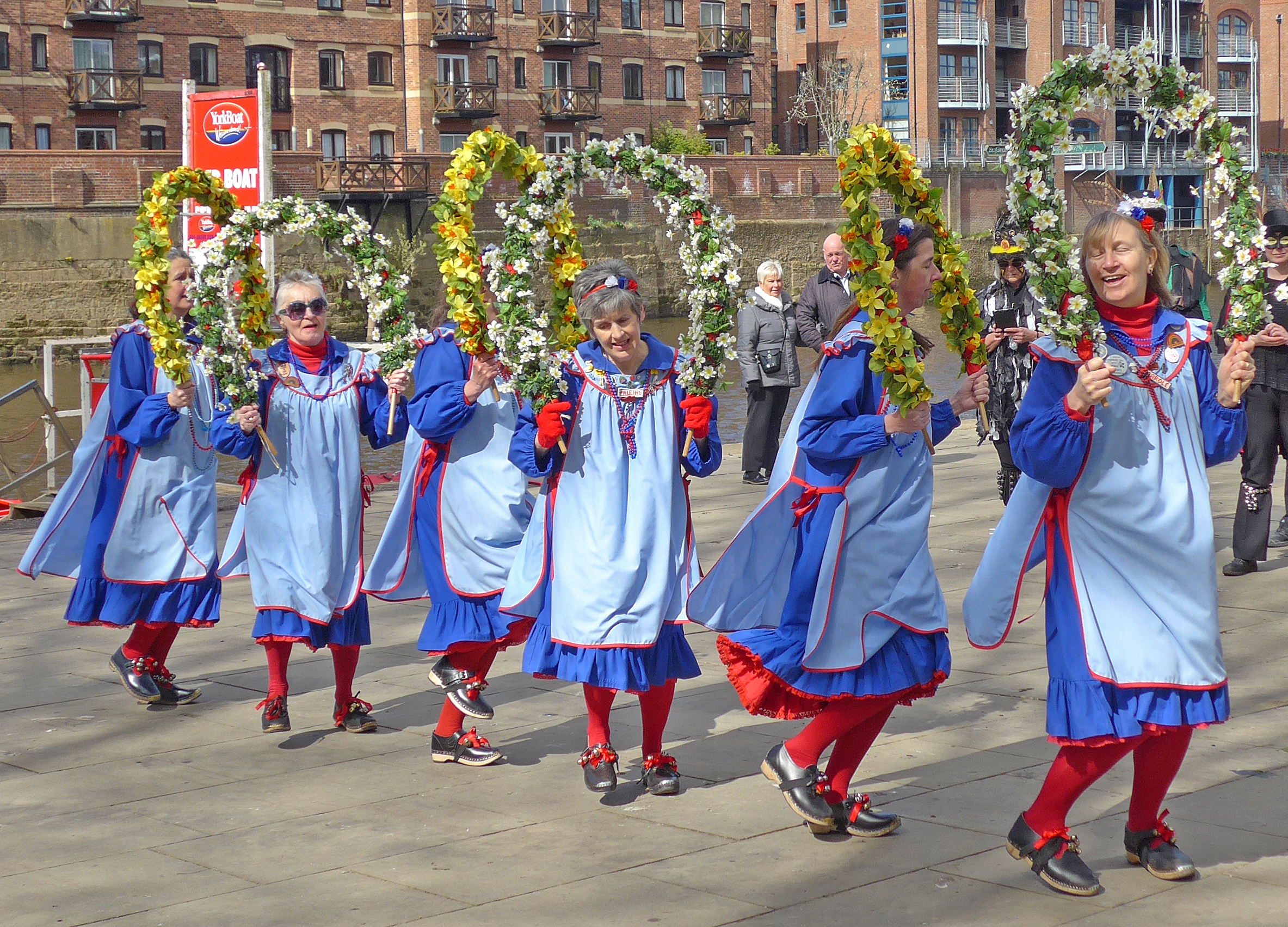
Garland dancers in York (2016)

Garland dancing is an English dance tradition that began in the 19th century in North England's mill towns.

Cecil Sharp identified garland dances as "survivals of processional ceremonies" from folk agricultural festivals. The Industrial Revolution brought rural folk to factory work, and hey brought with them dancing traditions from many rural areas. Garland dancing was a new combination of familiar movements, made more picturesque by flower-covered garlands. Mill owners and schools held garland dancing as a form of healthful exercise that also brought beauty to company events and town parades.

== See also ==
- Morris dance
- Maypole
