= Ebenezer Place, Wick =

Street credited as the world's shortest

Coordinates: 58°26′28.2″N 3°05′38.9″W

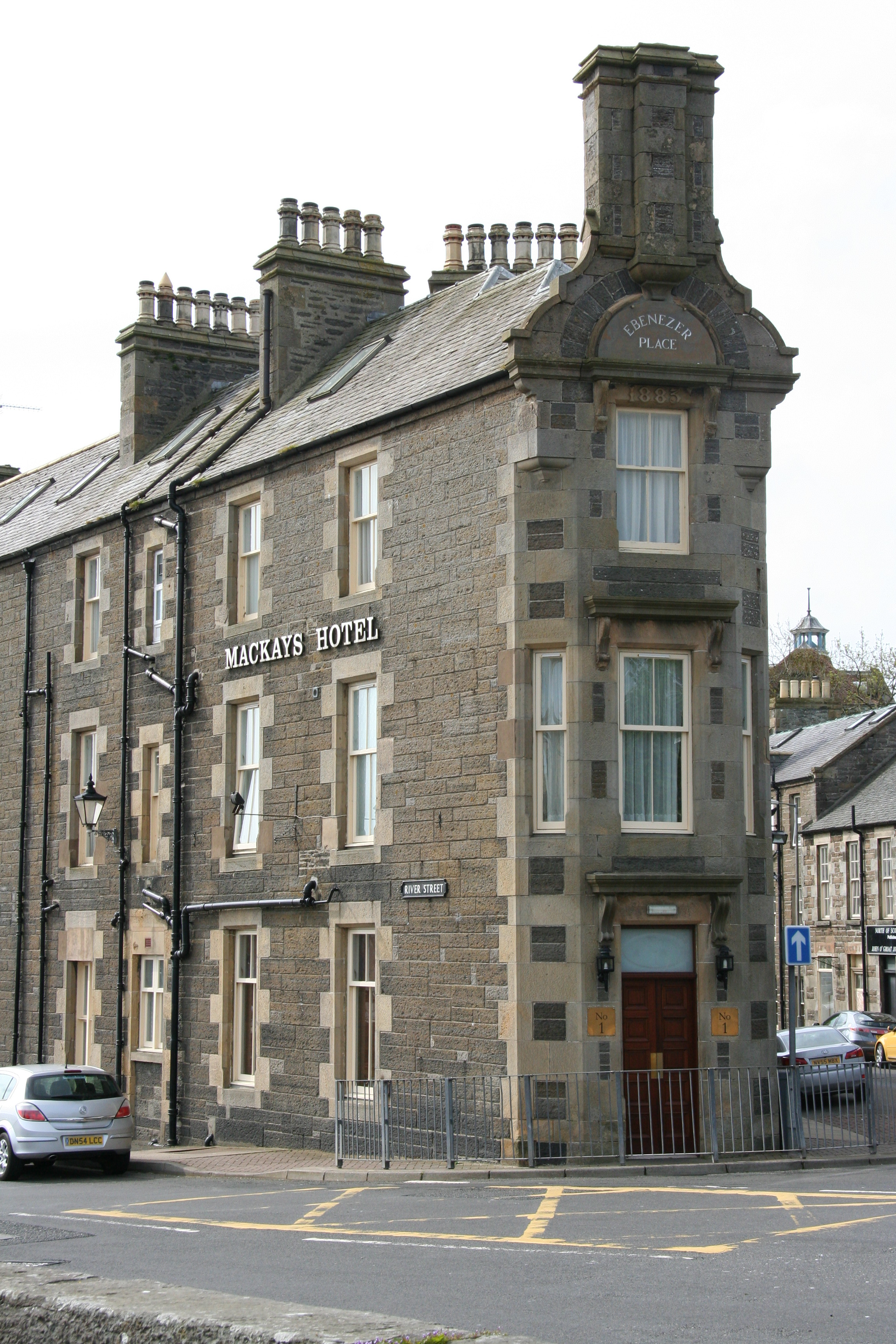
Ebenezer Place, Wick, with Union Street to the right, and River Street to the left

Ebenezer Place, in Wick, Caithness, Scotland, is credited by the Guinness Book of Records as being the world's shortest street at 2.06 m (6 ft 9 in).

== Street ==
The street has only one address: the entrance to No. 1 Bistro, which is part of Mackays Hotel. The hotel has other frontages onto Union Street and River Street, with its main entrance on Union Street.

Ebenezer Place originated in 1883, when 1 Ebenezer Place was constructed; the owner of the building was instructed to display a name on the shortest side of the hotel. It was officially declared a street in 1887.

Ebenezer Place was recognised by the Guinness Book of Records in 2006, after the owner of the Mackays Hotel building made an entrance into a new bistro. It replaced the previous record of 5.2 m (17 ft), held by Elgin Street, Bacup, England.
