= Broadclough =

Village in Lancashire, England

Coordinates: 53.712°N 2.203°W

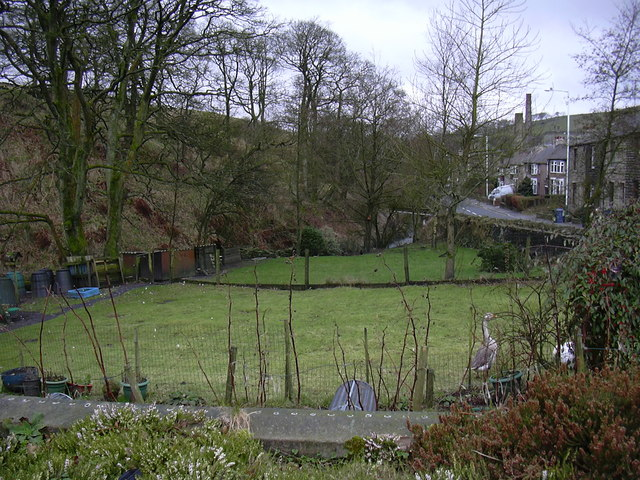
- Grassland in the centre of Broadclough in 2008

- Shown within Rossendale Location within Lancashire
- OS grid reference: SD866239
- District: Rossendale
- Shire county: Lancashire
- Region: North West
- Country: England
- Sovereign state: United Kingdom
- Post town: Bacup
- Postcode district: OL13
- Dialling code: 01706
- Police: Lancashire
- Fire: Lancashire
- Ambulance: North West
- UK Parliament: Rossendale and Darwen

Broadclough – historically Broad Clough (meaning "broad valley") – is a village located to the north of Bacup (where population details are included), previously having been a part of the old borough of Bacup and now with Rossendale borough of Lancashire and part of the Greenclough Ward. It is part of the Rossendale and Darwen constituency, with Andy MacNae having been the Member of Parliament since 2024. Like much of Bacup, Broadclough is rapidly becoming a commuter area for cities and towns such as Manchester, Burnley, Accrington, Preston, Blackburn, Rochdale (and further afield).

Broadclough is serviced by the mixed maintained Northern Primary School, which sits at the top of the ridge of the clough from which the village gets its name and Broadclough Lodge which is a special school. Children at Northern Primary School may take an 11 Plus exam to be considered for selection to Bacup and Rawtenstall Grammar School.

== History ==
The Goidelic Celts occupied the area around Broadclough and wolves were encountered in the hills around the clough as late as the 13th century.

Broadclough is said to be the site where a Danish chieftain was killed in a battle between the Danes and Saxons. His grave is said to be at a farm near Stubbylee, which is located around 1 1/2 miles south of Broadclough.

In January 2024 a Viking gaming piece or weight was found in Broadclough, which contained symbols including runes on its base.

=== Broadclough Dykes ===
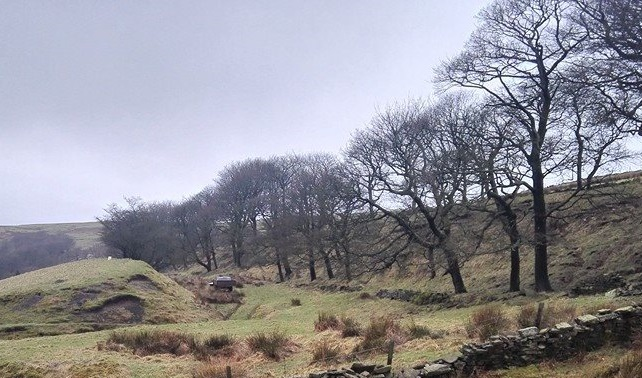
Photograph looking south at the main stretch of Broadclough Dykes in 2016

The village is made more significant because there exists what has been argued to be the most important archaeological site in the East Lancashire area, namely Broadclough Dykes. It has been claimed that in the 10th century, the Anglo-Saxons battled against Gaels and Norsemen at Broadclough, with some arguing this was the setting for the site of, or an encampment of an army before the Battle of Brunanburh.

Although the Dykes near Dykes House Farm have been studied, there are other earthworks that have yet to be studied. These include those that run next to the Roman road and Lane Head Farm, Bacup Old Road and Plantation View in neighbouring Weir. In addition there are other properties which aren't associated with the Dykes such as Dikes Barn Farm which suggest there may be other locations in Broadclough that need to be analysed.

Others have suggested these are of Roman rather than Saxon origin, whilst others believe it is a cross dyke, perhaps sharing its history with other neolithic features in the area, such as the nearby neolithic settlement at Tooter Hill, from which the dykes are highly visible.

The prevailing train of thought places Broadclough Dykes as an ancient structure, however, there is a suggestion that it may actually have an industrial origin as open-cast site for extraction of fireclay, from beneath an exposed coal seam. Whilst the industrial nature of the dyke is a possibility, Thomas Newbigging, in his 1887 book Historical Sketch of the Forest of Rossendale, reported the farmer from Dykes House Farm confirmed the undulating and pitted land closer to the turnpike, and behind what is now Broadclough Mill, is invariably made up of loose soil and is of a filled-up character, containing fragments of stick, bark and other substances that where not normally found in the natural deposits, suggesting the soils dug out of the dyke had been used to construct defences further down the slope.

=== Broadclough Buildings ===
Before Bacup rose in significance and before deafforestation, Broadclough historically sat in the Forest of Rossendale's Newchurch township, being a clough within the Bacup Booth. Broadclough Hall at Lower Broadclough was the seat of the Whittaker family, one of the most important families in the Forest of Rossendale, who held the position of Greave of the Forest as a quasi-hereditary title from around 1515 and having been associated with Broadclough since at least 1510, when it's recorded that he held a meeting of copyholders. Considered the only "ancient hall" in Rossendale, Broadclough Hall was originally built around 1596, with a coach house believed to date from circa 1750 featuring a rare recessed/rebated frontage with veranda. The hall had a number of notable visitors including Beatrix Potter and John Wesley. There is a date-stone of 1666 on a Tudor arch over the former side door, which is now concealed in a false porch. This datestone uses the initials IAW, which are believed to be the initials of John and Agnes Whitaker, where Agnes was Agnes Townley, who brought an injection of money into the family.

The present building was built in 1816 following the marriage of James Whitaker and Harriet, the daughter of the merchant John Ormerod of Bankside, Manchester, which had brought new money to the family. The existing building is the third hall to be built on the site, although it incorporates elements of the older buildings and it is likely a building had existed on or near the site previous to the first hall being built. Whilst many of Broadclough's buildings were built by the Whittakers of Broadclough Hall, a family by the name of Lord grew to become a significant property owner and there are a number of listed buildings within Broadclough that are associated with them, as well as a number of place names (including Lord's Court and Lord's Barn). Broadclough Farm, Higher Broadclough Barn and Dikes House Farm have date-stones associated with John Lord, with dates of 1697, 1729 and 1737, whilst Broadclough Mill features a date-stone - with the initials of his namesake descendant - which is dated 1835. Furthermore, Broadclough Farm has a stone trough dated 1877 built into a garden wall, although this trough was discovered near the barn and moved to its current location in 1982.

After over a hundred years of trading and having lost its licence in 1959, in 1971, Broadclough's pub, the Roebuck (opposite Lord's Court), was demolished as part of the Bacup slum clearance, allowing Burnley Road to be straightened. Whilst The Roebuck is generally considered to be Broadclough's only pub, some argue the Irwell pub sits at the outer edge of the village.

== Transport ==
Higher Broadclough (at Broadclough Farm and Step Row) was originally the furthest point of the road that is now A671 before it turned 90 degrees and headed up through the farm yard, past the notable Step Row and up the road that is now Bacup Old Road. There is also an old bridge (extant but no longer in use) which probably predates the 18th century and which sits 10 yards south east of Dog Pits Lane bridge, having once served to connect Bacup Old Road to Todmorden Old Road before the turnpike was built.

Parliament enacted the Rochdale to Burnley Turnpike Trust in 1755, which extended the main road through the village to Weir, via a huge embankment running between Higher Broadclough to Deerplay Moor, making Burnley much more accessible to road traffic.

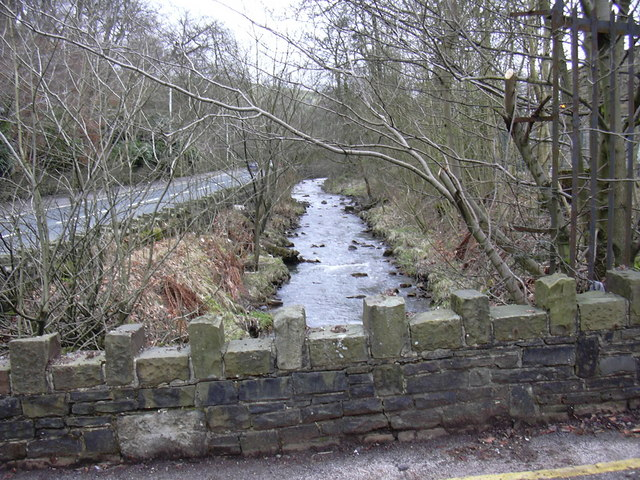
River Irwell close to Broadclough Hall serving Meadows Mill

The turnpike tolls on the road were abolished on 14 August 1880.

The section of Burnley Road that runs through Broadclough has become an accident blackspot, where speeding is seen as a problem on the road, with people into Broadclough from Weir often driving like they're still in open countryside according to local residents whilst Councillor Jimmy Eaton said: "It's not that long ago that a lady was killed not so far away from where this accident took place, and that wasn't the first. There have been many accidents along that stretch in recent times and I'm very concerned that there will be another fatality if something isn't done." The County Councillor has gone on to spearhead residents' calls for the creation of a bypass with the suggestion of utilising elements of the old highway Bacup Old Road.

There have been several attempts to further develop Broadclough; however, to date these have been refused on several grounds, with the main concerns have been the impact on the open countryside and moorlands and of Burnley Road, on which there has been a large number of accidents. The land on the boundary of Weir, adjacent to Broadclough Farm and Northern Primary School, has had several attempts at development including a 61-home plan as well as an 80-bed residential care unit which was refused locally and had an appeal dismissed by the planning inspectorate.

In June 2014 the police announced they would be monitoring the A671 between Weir and Bacup (which passes through Broadclough) as it has become an accident blackspot with a high number of accidents which have resulted in serious injury and even deaths.

Broadclough is served by the TransDev Rosso Number 8 bus between Burnley and Bacup, with stops near York Street, Northern Primary School, Broadclough Mill and Meadows Mill.

== Industry ==
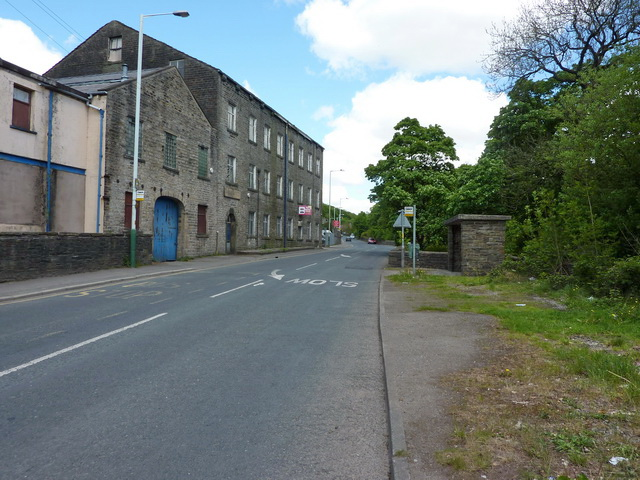
Broadclough Mill

There were around 50 farms owned by the Whittaker family in the Broadclough area in the 17th century however the industrial history of the area rapidly progressed with Broadclough becoming one of the first areas to industrialise, firstly through water mills off the River Irwell, notably those off Dog Pits Lane, opposite Broadclough Farm/ behind Lord's Court and Higher Broad Clough Mill, which was also known as the Owd Engine/Old Engine. These early mills were quickly replaced by steam powered spinning mills including the early 19th century Broadclough Mill and Meadows Mill.

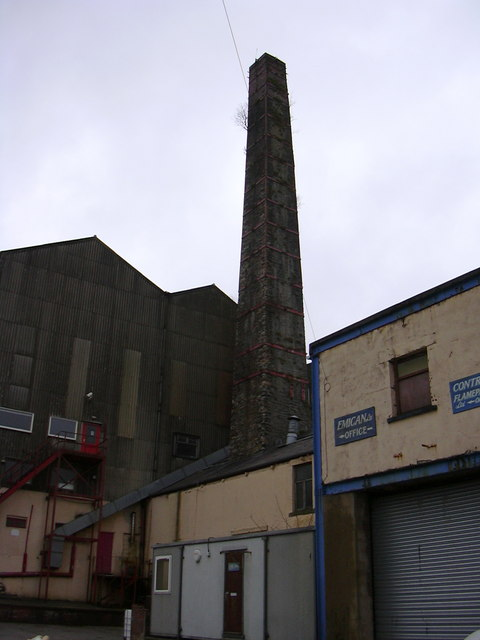
Broadclough Mill's chimney still dominates the area

The Grade 2 Broadclough Mill was built in 1824 as a successful water powered woollen mill which became steam powered by the 1830s, becoming a cotton spinning mill following enlargement and was later separated out into business units which is how it operates today. Broadclough Mill is the traditional starting point of the Bacup and Stacksteads Carnival parade which takes place each year in June.

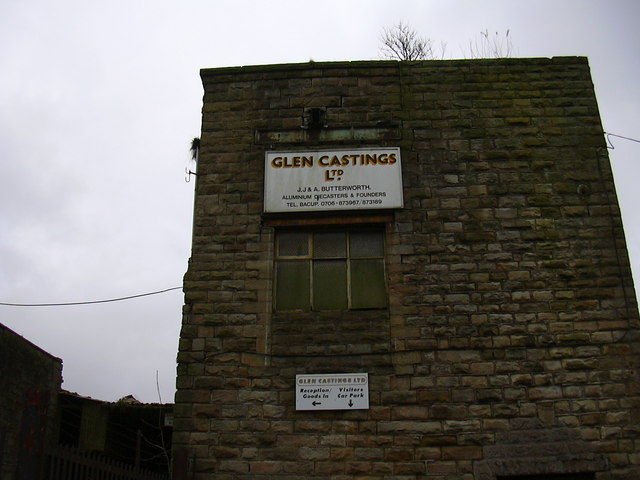
Meadows Mill at Lower Broadclough

There was also a colliery in the village known as Broadclough Colliery Coal Mine which was owned by George Hargreaves & Co, was operational by 1894 employing 3 men underground and one above ground however was disused by 1931. Broadclough has one of the most significant gravity mine water discharges in the UK which flows from the Old Meadows mine area of Broadclough, through the Broadclough Minewater Treatment Works to the River Irwell close to Broadclough Mill.

Broadclough Residents' Group is currently in the process of developing a plan to plant trees on former industrial or built areas of the hamlet to preserve an understanding of the area's industrial past. In September 2015 it was announced the Broadclough Residents' Group had been awarded almost 500 saplings by the Woodland Trust to plant around the area.

== Geography ==
The geography of Broadclough is central to the development of the settlement. It is a three-sided valley which is cut through at the northeast end by the River Irwell which runs the length of Broadclough. There is a trig point on the summit of Brex Height above Broadclough which marks the extent of the village's hinterland to the west. The Trig Point pillar built in May 1948 and was last maintained by the OS in October 1979. Brex Height is also the 12th highest summit in the West Pennines at 409 m (1342 ft).

== See also ==
- List of mills in Lancashire
- Battle of Brunanburh
- List of United Kingdom locations: Bro-Bron
