= Catholic schools in the United Kingdom =

Schools of the Roman Catholic church in the UK

In the United Kingdom, there are many 'local authority maintained' (i.e. state funded) Catholic schools. These are theoretically open to pupils of all faiths or none, although if the school is over-subscribed priority will be given to Roman Catholic children.

== History ==
During the Reformation, Catholic schools were created on the European continent for the training of children of Catholic families from Britain. During the 18th century, colleges for the training of priests were created in Scotland, such as in Scalan and Lismore Seminary. After the Re-establishment of the English hierarchy and the Scottish hierarchy new schools were created. After the Education Act 1918 in Scotland and the Education Act 1944 in England and Wales, state-funded Catholic schools were built. Nevertheless, today there has been some controversy over Roman Catholic schools. Some Labour backbenchers would like to see them closed along with all other faith-based schools, and this was the official policy of the Scottish Green Party at the 2007 Scottish Parliament election. Some local authorities – such as in Lanarkshire – have chosen to build so-called "shared campuses" where a Roman Catholic and non-denominational school share grounds, a building, and facilities such as canteen, sport halls etc., but lessons are taught separately. This policy has had mixed success – although supporters say it reduces the risk of "us and them" sectarianism, some shared campuses have suffered disruptions on opening. At one stage the Scottish Catholic Church even considered legal action against North Lanarkshire Council to stop another "shared campus" being built.

In Northern Ireland, Roman Catholic schools are state-funded and organised and run by the Council for Catholic Maintained Schools (CCMS).

== State Primary Schools ==
=== England ===
==== Barking and Dagenham ====
- St Joseph's RC Primary School, Barking
- St Joseph's RC Primary School, Dagenham
- St Peter's RC Primary School
- The St Teresa RC Primary School
- St Vincent's RC Primary School

==== Barnet ====
- The Annunciation Infant School
- The Annunciation Junior School
- Blessed Dominic Primary School
- Our Lady of Lourdes School
- Sacred Heart Primary School
- St Agnes' Primary School
- St Catherine's Primary School
- St Joseph's Primary School
- St Theresa's Primary School
- St Vincent's Primary School

==== Barnsley ====
- Holy Rood RC Primary School, Shaw Lands
- Holy Trinity RC and CE School, Athersley
- Sacred Heart RC Primary School, Goldthorpe
- St Helen's RC Primary School, Hoyland
- St Michael and All Angels RC Primary School, Wombwell

==== Bath and North East Somerset ====
- St John's RC Primary School, Bath
- St Mary's RC Primary School, Weston

==== Bedford ====
- John Rigby RC Primary School, Bedford
- St Joseph's and St Gregory's RC Primary School, Bedford

==== Bexley ====
- Our Lady of the Rosary RC Primary School
- St Fidelis RC Primary School
- St John Fisher RC Primary School
- St Joseph's RC Primary School
- St Peter Chanel RC Primary School
- St Stephen's RC Primary School
- St Thomas More RC Primary School

==== Birmingham ====
- Abbey RC Primary School
- Christ the King RC Primary School
- Corpus Christi RC Primary School*
- English Martyrs' RC Primary School
- Guardian Angels RC Primary School
- Holy Cross RC Primary School
- Holy Family RC Primary School
- Holy Souls RC Primary School
- Maryvale RC Primary School
- The Oratory RC Primary School
- Our Lady & St Rose of Lima RC Primary School
- Our Lady of Fatima RC Primary School
- Our Lady of Lourdes RC Primary School
- Our Lady's RC Primary School
- The Rosary RC Primary School
- Sacred Heart RC Primary School
- St Alban's RC Primary School
- St Ambrose Barlow RC Primary School
- St Anne's RC Primary School
- St Augustine's RC Primary School
- St Bernadette's RC Primary School
- St Bernard's RC Primary School
- St Brigid's RC Primary School
- St Catherine of Siena RC Primary School
- St Chad's RC Primary School
- St Clare's RC Primary School
- St Columba's RC Primary School
- St Cuthbert's RC Junior & Infant School
- St Dunstan's RC Primary School
- St Edmund's RC Primary School
- St Edward's RC Primary School
- St Francis RC Primary School
- St Gerard's RC Junior & Infant School
- St James RC Primary School
- St John Fisher RC Primary School
- St Joseph's RC Primary School
- St Joseph's RC Primary School
- St Joseph's RC Primary School
- St Jude's RC Primary School
- St Margaret Mary RC Junior & Infant School
- St Mark's RC Primary School
- St Martin de Porres RC Primary School
- St Mary's RC Primary School
- St Nicholas RC Primary School
- St Patrick's RC Primary School
- St Paul's RC Primary School
- St Peter & St Paul RC Junior & Infant School
- St Peter's RC Primary School
- St Teresa's RC Primary School
- St Thomas More RC Primary School
- St Vincent's RC Primary School
- St Wilfrid's RC Junior & Infant School
- SS John and Monica RC Primary School

==== Blackburn with Darwen ====
- Holy Souls RC Primary School, Blackburn
- Our Lady of Perpetual Succour RC Primary School, Blackburn
- Sacred Heart RC Primary School, Blackburn
- St Alban's RC Primary School, Blackburn
- St Anne's RC Primary School, Blackburn
- St Antony's RC Primary School, Blackburn
- St Edward's RC Primary School, Darwen
- St Joseph's RC Primary School, Darwen
- St Mary's and St Joseph's RC Primary School, Blackburn
- St Paul's RC Primary School, Feniscowles
- St Peter's RC Primary School, Blackburn

==== Blackpool ====
- Christ the King RC Academy
- Holy Family RC Primary School
- Our Lady of the Assumption RC Primary School
- St Bernadette's RC Primary School
- St Cuthbert's RC Academy
- St John Vianney's RC Primary School
- St Kentigern's RC Primary School
- St Teresa's RC Primary School

==== Bolton ====
- Holy Infant and St Anthony RC Primary School, Astley Bridge
- Our Lady of Lourdes RC Primary School, Farnworth
- Sacred Heart RC Primary School, Westhoughton
- St Bernard's RC Primary School, Deane
- St Brendan's RC Primary School, Harwood
- St Columba's RC Primary School, Tonge Moor
- St Ethelbert's RC Primary School, Deane
- St Gregory's RC Primary School, Farnworth
- St John the Evangelist's RC Primary School, Bromley Cross
- St Joseph's RC Primary School, Halliwell
- St Mary's RC Primary School, Horwich
- St Peter and St Paul RC Primary School, Bolton
- St Teresa's RC Primary School, Little Lever
- St Thomas of Canterbury RC Primary School, Heaton
- St William of York RC Primary School, Great Lever
- SS Osmund and Andrew's RC Primary School, Breightmet

==== Bournemouth, Christchurch and Poole ====
- Christ The King RC Primary School, Kinson
- Corpus Christi RC Primary School, Boscombe
- St Joseph's RC Primary School, Parkstone
- St Joseph's RC Primary School, Somerford
- St Mary's RC Primary School, Oakdale
- St Peter's RC School, Bournemouth
- St Walburga's RC Primary School, Bournemouth

==== Bracknell Forest ====
- St Joseph's RC Primary School, Bracknell
- St Margaret Clitherow RC Primary School, Hanworth

==== Bradford ====
- Our Lady and St Brendan's RC Primary School, Idle
- Our Lady of Victories RC School, Keighley
- The Sacred Heart RC Primary School, Ben Rhydding
- St Anne's RC Primary School, Keighley
- St Anthony's RC Primary School, Clayton
- St Anthony's RC Primary School, Shipley
- St Clare's RC Primary School, Fagley
- St Columba's RC Primary School, Dudley Hill
- St Cuthbert and the First Martyrs' RC Primary School, Heaton
- St Francis RC Primary School, Bolton Outlanes
- St John the Evangelist RC Primary School, Slack Side
- St Joseph's RC Primary School, Bingley
- St Joseph's RC Primary School, Holme Top
- St Joseph's RC Primary School, Ingrow
- St Mary's & St Peter's RC Primary School, Laisterdyke
- St Matthew's RC Primary School, Allerton
- St Walburga's RC Primary School, Shipley
- St William's RC Primary School, Longlands
- St Winefride's RC Primary School, Wibsey

==== Brent ====
- Convent of Jesus & Mary Infant School
- Our Lady of Grace Infant School
- Our Lady of Grace Junior School
- Our Lady of Lourdes Primary School
- St Joseph's Infant School
- St Joseph's Junior School
- St Joseph's Primary School
- St Margaret Clitherow Primary School
- St Mary Magdalen's Junior School
- St Mary's Primary School
- St Robert Southwell Primary School

==== Brighton and Hove ====
- Cottesmore St Mary's RC Primary School, Hove
- Our Lady of Lourdes RC Primary School Rottingdean
- St Bernadette's RC Primary School, Withdean
- St John The Baptist RC Primary School, Brighton
- St Joseph's RC Primary School, Hollingdean
- St Mary Magdalen's RC Primary School, Brighton
- St Mary's RC Primary School, Portslade

==== Bristol ====
- Holy Cross RC Primary School
- Our Lady Of The Rosary RC Primary School
- St Bernadette RC Primary School
- St Bernard's RC Primary School
- St Bonaventure's RC Primary School
- St Joseph's RC Primary School
- St Nicholas of Tolentine RC Primary School
- St Patrick's RC Primary School
- St Teresa's RC Primary School
- Ss Peter and Paul RC Primary School
- School Of Christ The King RC Primary

==== Bromley ====
- Holy Innocents Primary School
- St Anthony's Primary School
- St James' Primary School
- St Joseph's Primary School
- St Mary's Primary School
- St Peter and St Paul Primary School
- St Philomena's Primary School
- St Vincent's Primary School

==== Buckinghamshire ====
- Our Lady's RC Primary School, Chesham Bois
- St Edwards RC Junior School, Aylesbury
- St Joseph's RC Infant School, Aylesbury
- St Joseph's RC Primary School, Chalfont St Peter
- St Louis RC Primary School, Aylesbury
- St Michael's RC School, High Wycombe
- St Peter's RC Primary School, Marlow

==== Bury ====
- Guardian Angels RC Primary School, Elton
- Holly Mount RC Primary School, Greenmount
- Our Lady of Grace RC Primary School, Prestwich
- Our Lady of Lourdes RC Primary School, Bury
- St Bernadette's RC Primary School, Whitefield
- St Joseph and St Bede RC Primary School, Bury
- St Joseph's RC Primary School, Ramsbottom
- St Marie's RC Primary School, Bury
- St Mary's RC Primary School,Radcliffe
- St Michael's RC Primary School, Whitefield

==== Calderdale ====
- Sacred Heart RC Academy, Sowerby Bridge
- St John's RC Primary School, Rishworth
- St Joseph's RC Primary Academy, Brighouse
- St Joseph's RC Primary Academy, Halifax
- St Joseph's RC Primary Academy, Todmorden
- St Malachy's RC Primary School, Illingworth
- St Mary's RC Primary Academy, Halifax
- St Patrick's RC Primary Academy, Elland

==== Cambridgeshire ====
- All Saints Interchurch Academy, March (RC & CE)
- St Alban's RC Primary School, Cambridge
- St Laurence RC Primary School, Cambridge

==== Camden ====
- Our Lady Primary School
- Rosary Primary School
- St Eugene de Mazenod Primary School
- St Joseph's Primary School
- St Patrick's Primary School

==== Central Bedfordshire ====
- St Mary's RC Primary School, Caddington
- St Vincent's RC Primary School, Houghton Regis

==== Cheshire East ====
- Christ the King RC and CE Primary School, Macclesfield (RC & CE)
- St Alban's RC Primary School, Macclesfield
- St Anne's RC Primary School, Nantwich
- St Benedict's RC Primary School, Handforth
- St Gabriel's RC Primary School, Alsager
- St Gregory's RC Primary School, Bollington
- St Mary's RC Primary School, Congleton
- St Mary's RC Primary School, Crewe
- St Mary's RC Primary School, Middlewich
- St Paul's RC Primary School, Poynton

==== Cheshire West and Chester ====
- Our Lady Star of the Sea RC Primary School, Ellesmere Port
- St Bede's RC Primary School, Weaverham
- St Bernard's RC Primary School, Ellesmere Port
- St Clare's RC Primary School, Chester
- St Joseph's RC Primary School, Winsford
- St Luke's RC Primary School, Frodsham
- St Mary of the Angels RC Primary School, Little Sutton
- St Saviour's RC Primary and Nursery School, Great Sutton
- St Theresa's RC Primary School, Blacon
- St Werburgh's and St Columba's RC Primary School, Hoole
- St Wilfrid's RC Primary School, Hartford
- St Winefride's RC Primary School, Little Neston

==== Cornwall ====
- St John's RC Primary School, Camborne
- St Mary's RC Primary School, Bodmin
- St Mary's RC Primary School, Falmouth
- St Mary's RC Primary School, Penzance

==== Coventry ====
- All Souls' RC Primary School
- Christ The King RC Primary School
- Corpus Christi RC School
- Good Shepherd RC School
- Holy Family RC Primary School
- Our Lady of the Assumption RC Primary School
- Sacred Heart RC Primary School
- St Anne's RC Primary School
- St Augustine's RC Primary School
- St Elizabeth's RC Primary School
- St Gregory's RC Primary School
- St John Fisher RC Primary School
- St John Vianney RC Primary School
- St Mary and St Benedict RC Primary School
- St Osburg's RC Primary School
- St Patrick's RC Primary School
- St Thomas More RC Primary School
- SS Peter and Paul RC Primary School

==== Croydon ====
- Good Shepherd RC Primary School
- Margaret Roper RC Primary School
- Regina Coeli RC Primary School
- St Aidan's RC Primary School
- St Chad's RC Primary School
- St James The Great RC Primary and Nursery School
- St Joseph's RC Infant School
- St Joseph's RC Junior School
- St Mary's RC Infant School
- St Mary's RC Junior School
- St Thomas Becket RC Primary School

==== Cumberland ====
- Our Lady and St Patrick's RC Primary School, Maryport
- St Bede's RC Primary School, Carlisle
- St Begh's RC Junior School, Whitehaven
- St Bridget's RC Primary School, Egremont
- St Cuthbert's RC Primary School, Botcherby
- St Cuthbert's RC Primary School, Wigton
- St Gregory and St Patrick's RC Infant School, Whitehaven
- St Gregory's RC Primary School, Workington
- St James' RC Primary School, Millom
- St Joseph's RC Primary School, Frizington
- St Margaret Mary RC Primary School, Carlisle
- St Mary's RC Primary School, Whitehaven
- St Mary's RC Primary School, Salterbeck
- St Patrick's RC Primary School, Cleator Moor
- St Patrick's RC Primary School, Workington

==== Darlington ====
- Holy Family RC Primary School
- St Augustine's RC Primary School
- St Bede's RC Primary School
- St Teresa's RC Primary School

==== Derby ====
- St Alban's RC Academy
- St George's RC Academy
- St John Fisher RC Academy
- St Joseph's RC Academy
- St Mary's RC Academy

==== Derbyshire ====
- All Saints RC Voluntary Academy, Glossop
- Christ the King RC Academy, Alfreton
- English Martyrs' RC Academy, Long Eaton
- Immaculate Conception RC Primary, Spinkhill
- St Anne's RC Academy, Buxton
- St Charles' RC Primary Academy, Hadfield
- St Edward's RC Academy, Swadlincote
- St Elizabeth's RC Academy, Belper
- St Joseph's RC Academy, Matlock
- St Joseph's RC and CE Primary School, Staveley (RC & CE)
- St Joseph's RC Primary School, Langwith Junction
- St Margaret's RC Academy, Glossop
- St Mary's RC Academy, Glossop
- St Mary's RC Academy, New Mills
- St Mary's RC Primary School, Chesterfield
- St Thomas RC Academy, Ilkeston

==== Devon ====
- Our Lady and St Patrick's RC Primary School, Teignmouth
- Our Lady's RC Primary School, Barnstaple
- St John the Baptist RC Primary School, Dartmouth
- St John's RC Primary School, Tiverton
- St Joseph's RC Primary School, Exmouth
- St Joseph's RC Primary School, Highweek
- St Mary's RC Primary School, Axminster
- St Mary's RC Primary School, Buckfast
- St Nicholas RC Primary School, Exeter

==== Doncaster ====
- Holy Family RC Primary School, Stainforth
- Our Lady Of Mount Carmel RC Primary School, Doncaster
- Our Lady Of Perpetual Help RC Primary School,Bentley
- Our Lady of Sorrows RC Voluntary Academy, Armthorpe
- St Alban's RC Primary School, Denaby Main
- St Francis Xavier RC Primary School, Doncaster
- St Joseph and St Teresa's RC Primary School, Woodlands
- St Joseph's RC School, Rossington
- St Mary's RC Primary School, Edlington
- St Peter's RC Primary School, Doncaster

==== Dorset ====
- St Augustine's RC Primary School, Weymouth
- St Catherine's RC Primary School, Bridport
- St Mary and St Joseph's RC Primary School, Wool
- St Mary's RC First School, Dorchester (First School in 3 Tier area)
- St Mary's RC Primary School, Marnhull
- St Mary's RC Primary School, Swanage

==== Dudley ====
- Our Lady and St Kenelm RC School, Halesowen
- St Chad's RC Primary School, Sedgley
- St Joseph's RC Primary School, Dudley
- St Joseph's RC Primary School, Stourbridge
- St Mary's RC Primary School, Brierley Hill

==== Durham ====
- All Saints RC Primary school, Lanchester
- Blessed John Duckett RC Primary School, Tow Law
- Our Lady & St Joseph's RC Primary School, Leadgate
- Our Lady & St Thomas RC Primary School, Willington
- Our Lady of Lourdes RC Primary School, Shotton Colliery
- Our Lady of the Rosary RCVA Primary School, Peterlee
- Our Lady Queen of Martyrs' RC Primary School, Esh Winning
- Our Lady Star of the Sea RC Primary School, Horden
- St Bede's RC Primary School, Sacriston
- St Benet's RC Primary School, Ouston
- St Chad's RC Primary School, Witton Park
- St Charles' RC Primary School, Spennymoor
- St Cuthbert's RC Primary School, Chester-le-Street
- St Cuthbert's RC Primary School, Crook
- St Cuthbert's RC Primary School, Seaham
- St Godric's RC Primary School, Durham
- St Godric's RC Primary School, Wheatley Hill
- St Joseph's RC Primary School, Blackhall Colliery
- St Joseph's RC Primary School, Coundon
- St Joseph's RC Primary School, Durham
- St Joseph's RC Primary School, Murton
- St Joseph's RC Primary School, Newton Aycliffe
- St Joseph's RC Primary School, Stanley
- St Joseph's RC Primary School, Ushaw Moor
- St Mary Magdalen's RC Primary School, Seaham
- St Mary's RC Primary School, Barnard Castle
- St Mary's RC Primary School, Blackhill
- St Mary's RC Primary School, Newton Aycliffe
- St Mary's RC Primary School, South Moor
- St Mary's RC Primary School, Wingate
- St Michael's RC Primary School, Esh
- St Patrick's RC Primary School, Consett
- St Patrick's RC Primary School, Dipton
- St Patrick's RC Primary School, Langley Moor
- St Pius X RC Primary School, Consett
- St Thomas More RC Primary School, Durham
- St Wilfrid's RC Primary School, Bishop Auckland
- St William's RC Primary School, Trimdon

==== Ealing ====
- Holy Family RC Primary School
- Mount Carmel RC Primary School
- Our Lady of The Visitation RC Primary School
- St Anselm's RC Primary School
- St Gregory's RC Primary School
- St John Fisher RC Primary School
- St Joseph's RC Primary School
- St Raphael's RC Primary School
- St Vincent's RC Primary School

==== East Riding of Yorkshire ====
- Our Lady and St Peter Primary School, Bridlington
- St John of Beverley RC Primary School, Beverley
- St Joseph's RC Primary School, Goole
- St Mary and St Joseph RC Primary School, Pocklington
- St Mary's RC Primary School, Market Weighton

==== East Sussex ====
- Annecy RC Primary School, Seaford
- Sacred Heart RC Primary School, Hastings
- St Mary Magdalene's RC Primary School, Bexhill-on-Sea
- St Mary Star of the Sea RC Primary School, St Leonards-on-Sea
- St Marys RC Primary School, Crowborough
- St Pancras RC Primary School, Lewes
- St Philip's RC Primary School, Uckfield

==== Enfield ====
- Our Lady of Lourdes School
- St Edmund's Roman Catholic Primary School
- St George's Primary School
- St Mary's Primary School
- St Monica's Primary School

==== Essex ====
- The Bishops' CE and RC Primary School, Chelmsford
- Holy Cross RC Primary School, Harlow
- Holy Family RC Primary School, South Benfleet
- Holy Family RC Primary School, Witham
- Our Lady Immaculate RC Primary School, Chelmsford
- Our Lady of Ransom RC Primary School, Rayleigh
- St Alban's RC Academy, Harlow
- St Anne Line RC Infant School, Basildon
- St Anne Line RC Junior School, Basildon
- St Clare's RC Primary School, Clacton-on-Sea
- St Francis RC Primary School, Braintree
- St Francis RC Primary School, Maldon
- St Helen's RC Infant School, Brentwood
- St Helen's RC Junior School, Brentwood
- St John Fisher RC Primary School, Loughton
- St Joseph the Worker RC Primary School, Brentwood
- St Joseph's RC Primary School, Canvey Island
- St Joseph's RC Primary School, Harwich
- St Joseph's RC Primary School, South Woodham Ferrers
- St Luke's RC Academy, Harlow
- St Peter's RC Primary School, Billericay
- St Pius X RC Primary School, Chelmsford
- St Teresa's RC Primary School, Basildon
- St Teresa's RC Primary School, Colchester
- St Teresa's RC Primary School, Rochford
- St Thomas More RC Primary School, Saffron Walden
- St Thomas More's RC Primary School, Colchester

==== Gateshead ====
- Sacred Heart RC Primary School, Byermoor
- St Agnes RC Primary School, Crawcrook
- St Alban's RC Primary School, Gateshead
- St Anne's RC Primary School, Gateshead
- St Augustine's RC Primary School, Gateshead
- St Joseph's RC Infant School, Birtley
- St Joseph's RC Junior School, Birtley
- St Joseph's RC Primary School, Blaydon
- St Joseph's RC Primary School, Gateshead
- St Joseph's RC Primary School, Rowlands Gill
- St Mary's and St Thomas Aquinas RC Primary School, Blaydon
- St Mary's RC Primary School, Whickham
- St Oswald's RC Primary, Gateshead
- St Peter's RC Primary School, Gateshead
- St Philip Neri RC Primary School, Gateshead
- St Wilfrid's RC Primary School, Gateshead

==== Gloucestershire ====
- The Rosary RC Primary School, Stroud
- St Catherine's RC Primary School, Chipping Campden
- St Joseph's RC Primary School, Nympsfield
- St Mary's RC Primary School, Churchdown
- St Peter's RC Primary School, Gloucester
- St Thomas More RC Primary School, Cheltenham

==== Greenwich ====
- Holy Family RC Primary School
- Notre Dame RC Primary School
- Our Lady of Grace RC Primary School
- St Joseph's RC Primary School
- St Margaret Clitherow RC Primary School
- St Mary's RC Primary School
- St Patrick's RC Primary School
- St Peter's RC Primary School
- St Thomas A Becket RC Primary School
- St Thomas More RC Primary School

==== Hackney ====
- Our Lady and St Joseph's RC Primary School
- St Dominic's RC Primary School
- St Monica's RC Primary School
- St Scholastica's RC Primary School

==== Halton ====
- The Holy Spirit RC Primary School, Halton
- Our Lady Mother of the Saviour RC Primary School, Runcorn
- Our Lady of Perpetual Succour RC Primary School, Widnes
- St Augustine's RC Primary School, Runcorn
- St Basil's RC Primary School, Hough Green
- St Bede's Catholic Infant School, Widnes
- St Bede's Catholic Junior School, Widnes
- St Clement's RC Primary School, Runcorn
- St Edward's RC Primary School, Runcorn
- St Gerard's RC Primary and Nursery School, Widnes
- St Martin's RC Primary School, Runcorn
- St Michael's RC Primary School, Widnes

==== Hammersmith and Fulham ====
- Good Shepherd RC Primary School
- Holy Cross RC School
- Larmenier & Sacred Heart RC Primary School
- St Augustine's RC Primary School
- St John XXIII RC Primary School
- St Mary's RC Primary School
- St Thomas of Canterbury RC Primary School

==== Hampshire ====
- Our Lady and St Joseph RC Primary School, Pennington
- St Anne's RC Primary School, South Ham
- St Anthony's RC Primary School, Titchfield
- St Bede's RC Primary School, Basingstoke
- St Bernadette's RC Primary School, Farnborough
- St John The Baptist RC Primary School, Hampshire
- St Joseph's RC Primary School, Aldershot
- St Jude's RC Primary School, Fareham
- St Mary's RC Primary School, Gosport
- St Patrick's RC Primary School, Farnborough
- St Peter's RC Primary School, Waterlooville
- St Peter's RC Primary School, Winchester
- St Swithun Wells RC Primary School, Chandler's Ford
- St Thomas More's RC Primary School, Bedhampton

==== Haringey ====
- Our Lady of Muswell RC Primary School
- St Francis de Sales RC Infant School
- St Francis de Sales RC Junior School
- St Gildas’ RC Junior School
- St Ignatius RC Primary School
- St John Vianney RC Primary School
- St Martin of Porres RC Primary School
- St Mary's Priory RC Infant School
- St Mary's Priory RC Junior School
- St Paul's RC Primary School
- St Peter-in-Chains RC Infant School

==== Harrow ====
- St Anselm's RC Primary School
- St Bernadette's RC Primary School
- St George's Primary RC Academy
- St John Fisher RC Primary School
- St Joseph's RC Primary School
- St Teresa's RC Primary School

==== Hartlepool ====
- Sacred Heart RC Primary School
- St Bega's RC Primary School
- St Cuthbert's RC Primary School
- St John Vianney RC Primary School
- St Joseph's RC Primary School
- St Teresa's RC Primary School

==== Havering ====
- La Salette RC Primary School
- St Alban's RC Primary School
- St Joseph's RC Primary School
- St Mary's RC Primary School
- St Patrick's RC Primary School
- St Peter's RC Primary School
- St Ursula's RC Primary School

==== Herefordshire ====
- Our Lady's RC Primary School, Hereford
- St Francis Xavier RC Primary School, Hereford
- St Joseph's RC Primary School, Ross-on-Wye

==== Hertfordshire ====
- Divine Saviour RC Primary School, Abbots Langley
- The Holy Family RC Primary School, Welwyn Garden City
- Holy Rood RC Primary School, Watford
- Our Lady RC Primary School, Hitchin
- Our Lady RC Primary School, Welwyn Garden City
- Pope Paul RC Primary School, Potters Bar
- Sacred Heart RC Primary School, Ware
- Sacred Heart RC Primary School, Bushey
- St Albert the Great RC Primary School, Hemel Hempstead
- St Adrian RC Primary School, St Albans
- St Alban & St Stephen RC Primary School, St Albans
- St Anthony's RC Primary School, Watford
- St Augustine's RC Primary School, Hoddesdon
- St Bernadette RC Primary School, London Colney
- St Catherine of Siena RC Primary School, Watford
- St Cross RC Primary School, Hoddesdon
- St Cuthbert Mayne RC Junior School, Hemel Hempstead
- St Dominic RC Primary School, Harpenden
- St John Fisher RC Primary School, St Albans
- St John RC Primary School, Baldock
- St John RC Primary School, Rickmansworth
- St Joseph RC Primary School, South Oxhey
- St Joseph's RC Primary School, Bishop's Stortford
- St Joseph's RC Primary School, Hertford
- St Joseph's RC Primary School, Waltham Cross
- St Margaret Clitherow RC Primary School, Stevenage
- St Mary RC Primary School, Royston
- St Mary's RC School, Bishop's Stortford
- St Paul's RC Primary School, Cheshunt
- St Philip Howard RC Primary School, Hertford
- St Rose's RC Infants School, Boxmoor
- St Teresa RC Primary School, Borehamwood
- St Thomas More RC Primary School, Letchworth
- St Thomas More RC Primary School, Berkhamsted
- St Thomas of Canterbury RC Primary School, Puckeridge
- St Vincent de Paul RC Primary School, Stevenage

==== Hillingdon ====
- Botwell House RC Primary School
- Sacred Heart RC Primary School
- St Catherine RC Primary School
- St Mary's RC Primary School
- St Swithun Wells RC Primary School

==== Hounslow ====
- Our Lady & St John's RC Primary School
- The Rosary RC Primary School
- St Lawrence RC Primary School
- St Mary's RC Primary School
- St Mary's RC Primary School
- St Michael & St Martin RC Primary School

==== Isle of Wight ====
- St Francis RC & CE Primary Academy (RC & CE), Ventnor
- Holy Cross Catholic Primary School, East Cowes
- St Mary's Catholic Primary School, Ryde
- St Saviour's Catholic Primary School, Totland
- St Thomas of Canterbury Catholic Primary School, Newport

==== Islington ====
- Christ the King RC Primary School
- Sacred Heart RC Primary School
- St Joan of Arc RC Primary School
- St John the Evangelist RC Primary School
- St Joseph's RC Primary School
- St Peter & St Paul RC Primary School

==== Kensington and Chelsea ====
- Oratory RC Primary School
- Our Lady of Victories RC Primary School
- St Charles RC Primary School
- St Francis of Assisi RC Primary School
- St Joseph's RC Primary School
- St Mary's RC Primary School
- Servite RC Primary School

==== Kent ====
- The Holy Family RC Primary School, Maidstone
- More Park RC Primary School, West Malling
- Our Lady of Hartley RC Primary School, Hartley
- Our Lady's RC Primary School, Dartford
- St Anselm's RC Primary School, Temple Hill
- St Augustine's RC Primary School, Hythe
- St Augustine's RC Primary School, Royal Tunbridge Wells
- St Bartholomew's RC Primary School, Swanley
- St Edward's RC Primary School, Sheerness
- St Ethelbert's RC Primary School, Ramsgate
- St Francis' RC Primary School, Maidstone
- St Gregory's RC Primary School, Margate
- St John's RC Primary School, Gravesend
- St Joseph's RC Primary School, Aylesham
- St Joseph's RC Primary School, Broadstairs
- St Joseph's RC Primary School, Northfleet
- St Margaret Clitherow RC Primary School, Tonbridge
- St Mary's RC Primary School, Deal
- St Mary's RC Primary School, Whitstable
- St Peter's RC Primary School, Sittingbourne
- St Richard's RC Primary School, Dover
- St Teresa's RC Primary School, Ashford
- St Thomas' RC Primary School, Canterbury
- St Thomas' RC Primary School, Sevenoaks
- Stella Maris RC Primary School, Folkestone

==== Kingston-upon-Hull ====
- Endsleigh Holy Child RC Academy
- St Anthony's RC Academy
- St Charles' RC Academy
- St Mary Queen of Martyrs RC Academy
- St Richard's RC Academy
- St Thomas More RC Academy
- St Vincent's RC Academy

==== Kingston-upon-Thames ====
- Corpus Christi RC School
- Our Lady Immaculate RC School
- St Agatha's RC Primary School
- St Joseph's RC Primary School

==== Kirklees ====
- Holy Spirit RC Primary Academy, Heckmondwike
- Our Lady of Lourdes RC Primary Academy, Huddersfield
- St Joseph's RC Primary Academy, Dewsbury
- St Joseph's RC Primary Academy, Huddersfield
- St Mary's RC Primary Academy, Batley
- St Patrick's RC Primary Academy, Birstall
- St Patrick's RC Primary Academy, Huddersfield
- St Paulinus RC Primary Academy, Dewsbury

==== Knowsley ====
- Holy Family RC Primary School, Cronton
- Holy Family RC Primary School, Halewood
- Hope RC/CE Primary School, Huyton (RC & CE)
- Our Lady's RC Primary School, Prescot
- St Aidan's RC Primary School, Huyton
- St Albert's RC Primary School, Stockbridge Village
- St Aloysius RC Primary School, Roby
- St Andrew the Apostle RC Primary School, Halewood
- St Anne's RC Primary School, Huyton
- St Brigid's RC Primary School, Stockbridge Village
- St Columba's RC Primary School, Huyton
- St John Fisher RC Primary School, Knowsley
- St Joseph the Worker RC Primary School, Kirkby
- St Joseph's RC Primary School, Huyton
- St Laurence's RC Primary School, Kirkby
- St Leo's and Southmead RC Primary School, Whiston
- St Luke's RC Primary School, Prescot
- St Margaret Mary's RC Infant School, Swanside
- St Margaret Mary's RC Junior School, Swanside
- St Marie's RC Primary School, Kirkby
- St Mark's RC Primary School, Halewood
- St Michael and All Angels RC Primary School, Kirkby
- Ss Peter and Paul RC Primary School, Kirkby

==== Lambeth ====
- Corpus Christi RC Primary School
- St Andrew's RC Primary School
- St Anne's RC Primary School
- St Bede's RC Infant School
- St Bernadette RC Junior School
- St Helen's RC Primary School
- St Mary's RC Primary School

==== Lancashire ====
- Alston Lane RC Primary School, Longridge
- The Blessed Sacrament RC Primary School, Preston
- The Cathedral RC Primary School, Lancaster
- Christ The King RC Primary School, Burnley
- Claughton on Brock St Mary's RC Primary School, Claughton
- English Martyrs RC Primary School, Preston
- Garstang SS Mary and Michael RC Primary School, Garstang
- Holy Family RC Primary School, Preston
- Holy Family RC Primary School, Warton
- Holy Saviour RC Primary School, Nelson
- Holy Trinity RC Primary School, Lancashire
- Kirkham The Willows RC Primary School, Lancashire
- Lea St Mary's RC Primary School
- Longridge St Wilfrid's RC Primary School, Longridge
- Our Lady and St Anselm's RC Primary School, Whitworth
- Our Lady and St Edward's RC Primary School, Fulwood
- Our Lady and St Gerard's RC Primary School, Lostock Hall
- Our Lady and St Huthbert's RC Primary School, Great Harwood
- Our Lady of Lourdes RC Primary School, Carnforth
- Our Lady Star of the Sea RC Primary School, Lytham St Annes
- Parbold Our Lady and All Saints RC Primary School, Parbold
- Pilling St William's RC Primary School, Pilling
- Sacred Heart RC Primary School, Chorley
- Sacred Heart RC Primary School, Church
- Sacred Heart RC Primary School, Colne
- Sacred Heart RC Primary School, Preston
- Sacred Heart RC Primary School, Thornton-Cleveleys
- St Anne's and St Joseph's RC Primary School, Accrington
- St Anne's RC Primary School, Leyland
- St Anne's RC Primary School, Ormskirk
- St Anthony's RC Primary School, Fulwood
- St Augustine of Canterbury RC Primary School, Burnley
- St Augustine's RC Primary School, Preston
- St Bede's RC Primary School, Clayton Green
- St Bernadette's RC Primary School, Lancaster
- St Bernard's RC Primary School, Lea
- St Catherine's RC Primary School, Leyland
- St Chad's RC Primary School, Whittle-le-Woods
- St Charles RC School, Rishton
- St Clare's RC Primary School, Preston
- St Edmund's RC Primary School, Skelmersdale
- St Francis of Assisi RC Primary School, Skelmersdale
- St Francis RC Primary School, Goosnargh
- St Gregory's RC Primary School, Chorley
- St Gregory's RC Primary School, Preston
- St Ignatius RC Primary School, Preston
- St James RC Primary School, Skelmersdale
- St James-the-less RC Primary School, Rawtenstall
- St John Southworth RC Primary School, Nelson
- St John the Baptist RC Primary School, Burnley
- St John the Baptist RC Primary School, Padiham
- St John's RC Primary School, Burscough
- St John's RC Primary School, Poulton-le-Fylde
- St John's RC Primary School, Skelmersdale
- St Joseph's RC Primary School, Anderton
- St Joseph's RC Primary School, Barnoldswick
- St Joseph's RC Primary School, Chorley
- St Joseph's RC Primary School, Hoghton
- St Joseph's RC Primary School, Hurst Green
- St Joseph's RC Primary School, Lancaster
- St Joseph's RC Primary School, Medlar-with-Wesham
- St Joseph's RC Primary School, Preston
- St Joseph's RC Primary School, Stacksteads
- St Joseph's RC Primary School, Withnell
- St Maria Goretti RC Primary School, Preston
- St Mary and St Andrew's RC Primary School, Barton
- St Mary Magdalen's RC Primary School, Penwortham
- St Mary Magdalene's RC Primary School, Burnley
- St Mary's and St Benedict's RC Primary School, Bamber Bridge
- St Mary's RC Primary School, Bacup
- St Mary's RC Primary School, Burnley
- St Mary's RC Primary School, Chipping, Lancashire
- St Mary's RC Primary School, Chorley
- St Mary's RC Primary School, Clayton-le-Moors
- St Mary's RC Primary School, Euxton
- St Mary's RC Primary School, Fleetwood
- St Mary's RC Primary School, Great Eccleston
- St Mary's RC Primary School, Haslingden
- St Mary's RC Primary School, Langho
- St Mary's RC Primary School, Leyland
- St Mary's RC Primary School, Morecambe
- St Mary's RC Primary School, Osbaldeston
- St Mary's RC Primary School, Oswaldtwistle
- St Mary's RC Primary School, Sabden
- St Mary's RC Primary School, Scarisbrick
- St Michael and St John's RC Primary School, Clitheroe
- St Oswald's RC Primary School, Accrington
- St Oswald's RC Primary School, Coppull
- St Oswald's RC Primary School, Longton
- St Patrick's RC Primary School, Heysham
- St Patrick's RC Primary School, Walton-le-Dale
- St Peter and St Paul RC Primary School, Mawdesley
- St Peter's RC Primary School, Lytham St Annes
- St Peter's RC Primary School, Newchurch
- St Richard's RC Primary School, Skelmersdale
- St Teresa's RC Primary School, Penwortham
- St Teresa's RC Primary School, Preston
- St Teresa's RC Primary School, Upholland
- St Veronica's RC Primary School, Helmshore
- St Wulstan's and St Edmund's RC Primary Academy, Fleetwood
- St Wulstan's RC Primary School, Great Harwood
- Thorneyholme RC Primary School, Dunsop Bridge
- Wrightington St Joseph's RC Primary School, Wrightington

==== Leeds ====
- Christ The King RC Primary School, Leeds
- Corpus Christi RC Primary School, Leeds
- Holy Family RC Primary School, Leeds
- Holy Name RC Academy, Leeds
- Holy Rosary and St Anne's RC Primary School, Leeds
- Immaculate Heart of Mary RC Primary School, Leeds
- Our Lady of Good Counsel RC Primary School, Leeds
- Rothwell St Mary's RC Primary School, Rothwell
- Sacred Heart RC Primary School, Burley
- St Anthony's RC Primary School, Leeds
- St Augustine's RC Primary School, Leeds
- St Benedict's RC Primary School, Garforth
- St Edward's RC Primary School, Boston Spa
- St Francis RC Primary School, Morley
- St Francis of Assisi RC Primary School, Leeds
- St Joseph's Catholic Primary School, Hunslet
- St Joseph's Catholic Primary School, Otley
- St Joseph's Catholic Primary School, Pudsey
- St Joseph's Catholic Primary School, Wetherby
- St Mary's RC Primary School, Horsforth
- St Nicholas RC Primary School, Leeds
- St Patrick's RC Primary School, Leeds
- St Paul's RC Primary School, Leeds
- St Philip's RC Primary School, Leeds
- St Theresa's RC Primary School, Manston
- St Urban's RC Primary School, Leeds
- SS Peter and Paul RC Primary School, Yeadon

==== Leicester ====
- Christ the King RC Academy
- Holy Cross RC School
- Sacred Heart RC Academy
- St Joseph's RC Academy
- St Patrick's RC Academy
- St Thomas More RC Academy

==== Leicestershire ====
- Bishop Ellis RC Primary Academy, Thurmaston
- Holy Cross RC School, Whitwick
- Sacred Heart RC Academy, Loughborough
- St Charles RC Primary Academy, Measham
- St Clare's RC Primary School, Coalville
- St Francis RC Primary School, Melton Mowbray
- St John Fisher RC Academy, Wigston
- St Joseph's RC Academy, Market Harborough
- St Mary's RC Primary School, Loughborough
- St Peter's RC Academy, Earl Shilton
- St Peter's RC Primary School, Hinckley
- St Winefride's RC Academy, Shepshed

==== Lewisham ====
- Good Shepherd RC School
- Holy Cross RC Primary School
- Our Lady and St Philip Neri RC Primary School
- St Augustine's RC Primary School
- St Joseph's RC Primary School
- St Mary Magdalen's RC Primary School
- St Saviour's RC Primary School
- St William of York RC Primary School
- St Winifred's RC Primary School

==== Lincolnshire ====
- Boston St Mary's RC Primary Academy, Boston
- Our Lady of Good Counsel RC Primary School, Sleaford
- Our Lady of Lincoln RC Primary School, Lincoln
- The St Augustine's RC Academy, Stamford
- The St Hugh's RC Primary Academy, Lincoln
- The St Mary's RC Academy, Grantham
- St Norbert's RC Academy, Spalding

==== Liverpool ====
- All Saints' RC Primary School
- Blessed Sacrament RC Primary School
- Christ the King RC Primary School
- Emmaus CE/RC Primary School (RC & CE)
- Holy Cross RC Primary School
- Holy Family RC Primary School
- Holy Name RC Primary School
- Holy Trinity RC Primary School
- Much Woolton RC Primary School
- Our Lady and St Philomena's RC Primary School
- Our Lady and St Swithin's RC Primary School
- Our Lady Immaculate RC Primary School
- Our Lady of Good Help RC Primary School
- Our Lady of the Assumption RC Primary School
- Our Lady's Bishop Eton RC Primary School
- Runnymede St Edward's RC Primary School
- Sacred Heart RC Primary School
- St Ambrose RC Academy
- St Anne's RC Primary School
- St Anthony of Padua RC Primary School
- St Austin's RC Primary School
- St Cecilia's RC Infant School
- St Cecilia's RC Junior School
- St Charles' RC Primary School
- St Christopher's RC Primary School
- St Clare's RC Primary School
- St Cuthbert's RC Primary and Nursery School
- St Finbar's RC Primary School
- St Francis de Sales RC Infant and Nursery School
- St Francis de Sales RC Junior School
- St Gregory's RC Primary School
- St Hugh's RC Primary School
- St John's RC Primary School
- St Matthew's RC Primary School
- St Michael's RC Primary School
- St Nicholas RC Academy
- St Oswald's RC Primary School
- St Paschal Baylon's RC Primary School
- St Patrick's RC Primary School
- St Paul's and St Timothy's RC Infant School
- St Paul's RC Junior School
- St Sebastian's RC Primary School and Nursery
- St Teresa of Lisieux RC Primary School
- St Vincent de Paul RC Primary School
- The Trinity RC Academy

==== Luton ====
- Sacred Heart RC Primary School
- St Joseph's RC Primary School
- St Margaret of Scotland RC Primary School
- St Martin de Porres RC Primary School

==== Manchester ====
- Christ The King RC Primary School
- The Divine Mercy RC Primary School
- Holy Name RC Primary School
- Mount Carmel RC Primary School
- Our Lady's RC Primary School
- Sacred Heart RC Primary School
- Sacred Heart RC Primary School
- St Aidan's RC Primary School
- St Ambrose RC Primary School
- St Anne's RC Primary School
- St Anne's RC Primary School
- St Anthony's RC Primary School
- St Bernard's RC Primary School
- St Brigid's RC Primary School
- St Catherine's RC Primary School
- St Chad's RC Primary School
- St Clare's RC Primary School
- St Cuthbert's RC Primary School
- St Dunstan's RC Primary School
- St Edmund's RC Primary School
- St Elizabeth's RC Primary School
- St Francis RC Primary School
- St John Bosco RC Primary School
- St John's RC Primary School
- St Joseph's RC Primary School
- St Kentigern's RC Primary School
- St Malachy's RC Primary School
- St Margaret Mary's RC Primary School
- St Mary's RC Primary School
- St Patrick's RC Primary School
- St Peter's RC Primary School
- St Richard's RC Primary School
- St Wilfrid's RC Primary School
- St Willibrord's RC Primary School

==== Medway ====
- English Martyrs RC Primary School, Strood
- St Augustine of Canterbury RC Primary School, Rainham
- St Benedict's RC Primary School, Chatham
- St Mary's RC Primary School, Gillingham
- St Michael's RC Primary School, Chatham
- St Thomas More RC Primary School, Chatham
- St Thomas of Canterbury RC Primary School, Rainham
- St William of Perth RC Primary School, Rochester

==== Merton ====
- Sacred Heart RC Primary School
- St John Fisher RC Primary School
- St Mary's RC Primary School
- SS Peter and Paul RC Primary School
- St Teresa's RC Primary School
- St Thomas of Canterbury RC Primary School

==== Middlesbrough ====
- Corpus Christi RC Primary School
- Sacred Heart RC Primary School
- St Alphonsus' RC Primary School
- St Augustine's RC Primary School
- St Bernadette's RC Primary School
- St Clare's RC Primary School
- St Edward's RC Primary School
- St Gerard's RC Primary School
- St Joseph's RC Primary School
- St Puis X RC Primary School
- St Thomas More RC Primary School

==== Milton Keynes ====
- Bishop Parker RC Primary School
- St Bernadette's RC Primary School
- St Mary Magdalene RC Primary School
- St Monica's RC Primary School
- St Thomas Aquinas RC Primary School

==== Newcastle-upon-Tyne ====
- English Martyrs RC Primary School
- Our Lady and St Anne's RC Primary School
- Sacred Heart RC Primary School
- St Alban's RC Primary School
- St Bede's RC Primary School
- St Catherine's RC Primary School
- St Charles' RC Primary School
- St Cuthbert's RC Primary School
- St Cuthbert's RC Primary School
- St George's RC Primary School
- St John Vianney RC Primary School
- St Joseph's RC Primary School
- St Lawrence's RC Primary School
- St Mark's RC Primary School
- St Michael's RC Primary School
- St Oswald's RC Primary School
- St Teresa's RC primary school
- St Vincent's RC Primary School

==== Newham ====
- St Antony's RC Primary School
- St Edward's RC Primary School
- St Francis' RC Primary School
- St Helen's RC Primary School
- St Joachim's RC Primary School
- St Michael's RC Primary School
- St Winefride's RC Primary School

==== Norfolk ====
- St Augustine's RC Primary School, Costessey
- St Francis of Assisi RC Primary School, Norwich
- St Martha's RC Primary School, King’s Lynn
- St Mary and St Peter RC Primary School, Great Yarmouth

==== North East Lincolnshire ====
- St Joseph's RC Primary Academy, Cleethorpes
- St Mary's RC Academy, Grimsby

==== North Lincolnshire ====
- St Augustine Webster RC Academy, Scunthorpe
- St Bernadette's RC Primary Academy, Ashby
- St Mary's RC Primary Academy, Brigg
- St Norbert's RC Primary Academy, Crowle

==== North Northamptonshire ====
- Our Lady of Walsingham RC Primary School, Corby
- Our Lady's RC Primary School, Wellingborough
- St Brendan's Catholic Primary School, Corby
- St Edward's Catholic Primary School, Kettering
- St Patrick's RC Primary School, Corby
- St Thomas More RC Primary School, Corby
- St Thomas More Catholic Primary School, Kettering

==== North Somerset ====
- Corpus Christi RC Primary School, Weston-super-Mare
- St Francis RC Primary School, Nailsea
- St Joseph's RC Primary School, Portishead

==== North Tyneside ====
- St Aidan's RC Primary School, Wallsend
- St Bernadette's RC Primary, Wallsend
- St Columba's RC Primary School, Wallsend
- St Cuthbert's RC Primary School, North Shields
- St Joseph's RC Primary School, Chirton
- St Mary's RC Primary School, Cullercoats
- St Mary's RC Primary School, Forest Hall
- St Stephen's RC Primary School, Longbenton
- Star of the Sea RC Primary School, Whitley Bay

==== North Yorkshire ====
- All Saints RC Primary School, Thirsk
- Barkston Ash RC Primary School, Barkston Ash
- Sacred Heart RC Primary School, Northallerton
- St Benedict's RC Primary School, Ampleforth
- St George's RC Primary School, Eastfield
- St Hedda's RC Primary School, Egton Bridge
- St Joseph's RC Primary School, Harrogate
- St Joseph's RC Primary School, Pickering
- St Mary's RC Primary School, Knaresborough
- St Mary's RC Primary School, Malton
- St Mary's RC Primary School, Richmond
- St Mary's RC Primary School, Selby
- St Peter's RC Primary School, Scarborough
- St Robert's RC Primary School, Harrogate
- St Stephen's RC Primary School, Skipton
- St Wilfrid's RC Primary School, Ripon

==== Northumberland ====
- St Aidan's RC Primary School, Ashington
- St Bede's RC Primary School, Bedlington
- St Matthew's RC Primary School, Prudhoe
- St Paul's RC Primary School, Alnwick
- St Wilfrid's RC Primary School, Blyth
- Ss Peter and Paul's RC Primary Academy, Cramlington

First Schools (4-9)

- St Cuthbert's RC First School, Berwick-upon-Tweed
- St Mary's RC First School, Hexham
- St Robert's RC First School, Morpeth
- St Joseph's Roman Catholic Middle School (Middle School)

==== Nottingham ====
- Blessed Robert Widmerpool RC Primary School
- Our Lady & St Edward RC Primary Academy
- Our Lady of Perpetual Succour RC Primary School
- St Augustine's RC Primary School
- St Margaret Clitherow RC Primary School
- St Mary's RC Primary School
- St Patrick's RC Primary School
- St Teresa's RC Primary School

==== Nottinghamshire ====
- The Good Shepherd RC Primary School, Woodthorpe
- Holy Cross RC Primary Academy, Hucknall
- Holy Family RC Primary School, Worksop
- Holy Trinity RC Academy, Newark-on-Trent
- The Priory RC Academy, Eastwood, Nottinghamshire
- The Sacred Heart RC Primary Academy, Carlton
- St Edmund Campion RC Primary School, West Bridgford
- St Joseph's RC Primary School, Boughton
- St Joseph's RC Primary School, Retford
- St Patrick's RC Primary School, Bircotes
- St Patrick's RC Primary School, Mansfield
- St Philip Neri With St Bede RC Academy, Mansfield

==== Oldham ====
- Corpus Christi RC Primary School, Chadderton
- Holy Family RC Primary School, Oldham
- Holy Rosary RC Primary School, Oldham
- St Anne's RC Primary School, Oldham
- St Edward's RC School, Lees
- St Herbert's RC School, Chadderton
- St Joseph's RC Junior Infant and Nursery School, Shaw
- St Mary's RC Primary School, Failsworth
- St Patrick's RC Primary School, Oldham
- St Teresa's RC Primary School, Oldham
- SS Aidan and Oswald's RC Primary School, Royton

==== Oxfordshire ====
- Holy Trinity RC School, Chipping Norton
- Our Lady of Lourdes RC Primary School, Witney
- Our Lady's RC Primary School, Cowley
- Sacred Heart RC Primary School, Henley-on-Thames
- St Aloysius' RC Primary School, Oxford
- St Amand's RC Primary School, East Hendred
- St Edmund's RC Primary School, Abingdon-on-Thames
- St John Fisher RC Primary School, Littlemore
- St John's RC Primary School, Banbury
- St Joseph's RC Primary School, Banbury
- St Joseph's RC Primary School, Carterton
- St Joseph's RC Primary School, Headington
- St Joseph's RC Primary School, Thame
- St Mary's RC Primary School, Bicester
- St Thomas More RC Primary School, Kidlington

==== Peterborough ====
- Sacred Heart RC Primary School
- St John Henry Newman RC Primary School
- St Thomas More RC Primary School

==== Plymouth ====
- Holy Cross RC Primary School
- Keyham Barton RC Primary School
- St Joseph's RC Primary School
- St Paul's RC Primary School
- St Peter's RC Primary School

==== Portsmouth ====
- Corpus Christi RC Primary School
- St John's Cathedral RC Primary School
- St Paul's RC Primary School
- St Swithun's RC Primary School

==== Reading ====
- Christ the King RC Primary School
- English Martyrs' RC Primary School
- St Anne's RC Primary School
- St Martin's RC Primary School

==== Redbridge ====
- Our Lady of Lourdes RC Primary School
- St Aidan's RC Primary Academy
- St Antony's RC Primary School
- St Augustine's RC Primary School
- St Bede's RC Primary School
- SS Peter and Paul's RC Primary School

==== Redcar and Cleveland ====
- St Bede's RC Primary School, Marske-by-the-Sea
- St Benedict's RC Primary School, Redcar
- St Gabriel's RC Primary School, Ormesby
- St Joseph's RC Primary School, Loftus
- St Margaret Clitherow's RC Primary School, South Bank
- St Mary's RC Primary School, Grangetown, North Yorkshire
- St Paulinus RC Primary School, Guisborough

==== Richmond-upon-Thames ====
- Sacred Heart Primary School
- St Edmund's RC Primary School
- St Elizabeth's RC Primary School
- St James's RC Primary School
- St Mary Magdalen's RC Primary School
- St Osmund's RC Primary School
- St Richard Reynolds RC College

==== Rochdale ====
- Alice Ingham RC Primary School, Rochdale
- Holy Family RC Primary School, Rochdale
- Our Lady and St Paul's RC Primary School, Darnhill
- Sacred Heart RC Primary School, Rochdale
- St Gabriel's RC Primary School, Castleton
- St John's RC Primary School, Rochdale
- St Joseph's RC Primary School, Heywood
- St Mary's RC Primary School, Langley
- St Mary's RC Primary School, Littleborough
- St Patrick's RC Primary School, Rochdale
- St Peter's RC Primary School, Middleton
- St Thomas More RC Primary School, Alkrington
- St Vincent's RC Primary, Norden

==== Rotherham ====
- Our Lady and St Joseph's RC Primary School, Wath upon Dearne
- St Bede's RC Primary School, Rotherham
- St Gerard's RC Primary School, Thrybergh
- St Joseph's RC Primary School, Dinnington
- St Joseph's RC Primary School, Rawmarsh
- St Mary's RC Primary School, Rotherham
- St Mary's RC Primary School, Maltby

==== Rutland ====
- English Martyrs' RC Primary School, Oakham

==== Salford ====
- The Cathedral School of St Peter & St John, Salford
- Christ The King RC Primary School, Walkden
- Holy Cross and All Saints' RC Primary School, Barton-upon-Irwell
- Holy Family RC Primary School, Salford
- Our Lady and Lancashire Martyrs' RC Primary School, Worsley
- St Boniface's RC Primary School, Salford
- St Charles' RC Primary School, Moorside, Swinton
- St Gilbert's RC Primary School, Eccles
- St Edmund's RC Primary School, Little Hulton
- St Joseph The Worker RC Primary School, Irlam
- St Joseph's RC Primary School, Ordsall
- St Luke's RC Primary School, Irlams o' th' Height
- St Luke's RC Primary School, Salford
- St Mark's RC Primary School, Clifton
- St Mary's RC Primary School, Eccles
- St Mary's RC Primary School, Swinton
- St Phillip's RC Primary School, Salford
- St Sebastian's RC Primary School, Salford
- St Teresa's RC Primary School, Irlam
- St Thomas of Canterbury RC Primary School, Salford

==== Sandwell ====
- Holy Name RC Primary School, Great Barr
- Our Lady & St Hubert's RC Primary School, Oldbury
- St Francis Xavier RC Primary School, Oldbury
- St Gregory's RC Primary School, Smethwick
- St John Bosco RC Primary School, West Bromwich
- St Mary's RC Primary School, Wednesbury
- St Philip's RC Primary School, Smethwick

==== Sefton ====
- All Saints RC Primary School, Bootle
- English Martyrs RC Primary School, Litherland
- Great Crosby RC Primary School, Crosby
- Holy Family RC Primary School, Southport
- Holy Rosary RC Primary School, Aintree
- Holy Spirit RC Academy, Bootle
- Our Lady of Compassion RC Primary School, Formby
- Our Lady of Lourdes RC Primary School, Southport
- Our Lady of Walsingham RC Primary School, Netherton
- Our Lady Queen of Peace RC Primary School, Litherland
- Our Lady Star of the Sea RC Primary School, Seaforth
- St Benedict's RC Primary School, Netherton
- St Edmund's and St Thomas' RC Primary School, Waterloo
- St Elizabeth's RC Primary School, Litherland
- St George's RC Primary School, Maghull
- St Gregory's RC Primary School, Lydiate
- St Jerome's RC Primary School, Formby
- St John Bosco RC Primary School, Maghull
- St Mary's RC Primary School, Crosby
- St Monica's RC Primary School, Bootle
- St Patrick's RC Primary School, Southport
- St Robert Bellarmine RC Primary School, Bootle
- St William of York RC Primary School, Crosby
- Ursuline RC Primary School, Crosby

==== Sheffield ====
- Emmaus RC and CE Primary School (RC & CE)
- Sacred Heart RC School
- St Ann's RC Primary School
- St Catherine's RC Primary School
- St John Fisher RC Primary
- St Joseph's RC Primary School
- St Marie's RC School
- St Mary's RC Primary School
- St Patrick's RC Voluntary Academy
- St Theresa's Catholic Primary School
- St Thomas More RC Primary
- St Thomas of Canterbury RC Primary School
- St Wilfrid's RC Primary School

==== Shropshire ====
- Our Lady and St Oswald's RC Primary School, Oswestry
- St John's RC Primary School, Bridgnorth
- Shrewsbury Cathedral RC Primary School, Shrewsbury

==== Slough ====
- Holy Family RC Primary School
- Our Lady of Peace RC Primary School
- St Anthony's RC Primary School
- St Ethelbert's RC Primary School

==== Solihull ====
- Our Lady of Compassion RC Primary School, Solihull
- Our Lady of the Wayside RC Primary School, Shirley
- St Andrew's RC Primary School, Solihull
- St Anne's RC Primary School, Chelmsley Wood
- St Anthony's RC Primary School, Kingshurst
- St Augustine's RC Primary school, Solihull
- St George & St Teresa RC Primary School, Bentley Heath
- St John the Baptist RC Primary School, Chelmsley Wood

==== Somerset ====
- Our Lady of Mount Carmel RC Primary, Wincanton
- St Benedict's RC Primary School, Midsomer Norton
- St George's RC School, Taunton
- St Gildas RC Primary School, Yeovil
- St Joseph and St Teresa RC Primary School, Wells
- St Joseph's RC Primary School, Bridgwater
- St Joseph's RC Primary School, Burnham-on-Sea
- St Louis RC Primary School, Frome

==== South Gloucestershire ====
- Christ The King RC Primary School, Thornbury
- Holy Family RC Primary School, Patchway
- Our Lady of Lourdes RC Primary School, Kingswood
- St Augustine of Canterbury RC Primary School, Downend
- St Mary's RC Primary School, Bradley Stoke
- St Paul's RC Primary School, Yate

==== South Tyneside ====
- St Aloysius' RC Infant School, Hebburn
- St Aloysius' RC Junior School, Hebburn
- St Bede's RC Primary School, Jarrow
- St Bede's RC Primary School, South Shields
- St Gregory's RC Primary School, South Shields
- St James RC Primary School, Hebburn
- St Joseph's RC Primary School, Jarrow
- St Mary's RC Primary School, Jarrow
- St Matthew's RC Primary School, Jarrow
- St Oswald's RC Primary School, South Shields
- Ss Peter and Paul RC Primary School, Tyne Dock

==== Southampton ====
- Holy Family RC Primary School
- St Patrick's RC Primary School
- Springhill RC Primary School

==== Southend-on-Sea ====
- Our Lady of Lourdes Catholic Primary School
- Sacred Heart Catholic Primary School
- St George's Catholic Primary School
- St Helen's Catholic Primary School

==== Southwark ====
- English Martyrs RC Primary School
- St Anthony's RC Primary School
- St Francis RC Primary School
- St George's Cathedral RC Primary School
- St James the Great RC Primary School
- St John's RC Primary School
- St Joseph's RC Infant'’ School
- St Joseph's RC Junior School
- St Joseph's RC Primary School
- St Joseph's RC Primary School
- St Joseph's RC Primary School

==== St Helens ====
- Corpus Christi RC Primary School, Rainford
- Haydock English Martyrs' RC Primary School, Haydock
- Holy Cross RC Primary School, St Helens
- Holy Spirit RC Primary School, St Helens
- St Anne's RC Primary School, St Helens
- St Austin's RC Primary School, St Helens
- St Bartholomew's RC Primary School, Rainhill
- St John Vianney RC Primary School, Thatto Heath
- St Julie's RC Primary School, St Helens
- St Mary's RC Infant School, Newton-le-Willows
- St Mary's RC Junior School, Newton-le-Willows
- St Mary's RC Primary School, Billinge, Merseyside
- St Mary's RC Primary School, Haydock
- St Peter and St Paul RC Primary School, Haresfinch
- St Teresa's RC Primary School, St Helens
- St Theresa's RC Primary School, St Helen's
- St Thomas of Canterbury RC Primary School, Windle

==== Staffordshire ====
- Blessed Mother Teresa's RC Primary School, Stafford
- Blessed Robert Sutton RC Voluntary Academy, Stapenhill
- The Faber RC Primary School, Cotton
- Holy Rosary RC Voluntary Academy, Burton upon Trent
- Our Lady and St Werburghs RC Primary School, Newcastle-under-Lyme
- Our Lady of Grace RC Academy, Biddulph
- St Anne's RC Primary School, Stafford
- St Austin's RC Primary School, Stafford
- St Bernadette's RC Primary School, Wombourne
- St Christopher's RC Primary Academy, Codsall
- St Dominic's RC Primary School, Stone
- St Elizabeth's RC Primary School, Tamworth
- St Filumena's RC Primary School, Blythe Bridge
- St Gabriel's RC Primary School, Tamworth
- St Giles' RC Primary School, Cheadle
- St John the Evangelist RC Primary, Kidsgrove
- St John's RC Primary School, Great Haywood
- St Joseph and St Theresa RC Primary, Burntwood
- St Joseph's RC Primary School, Hednesford
- St Joseph's RC Primary School, Lichfield
- St Joseph's RC Primary School, Rugeley
- St Joseph's RC Primary School, Uttoxeter
- St Mary's RC Academy, Leek
- St Mary's RC Primary School, Brewood
- St Mary's RC Primary School, Cannock
- St Mary's RC Primary School, Newcastle-under-Lyme
- St Modwen's RC Primary School, Horninglow
- St Patrick's RC Primary School, Stafford
- St Thomas' RC Primary School, Tean
- St Thomas More RC Primary School, Great Wyrley
- St Wulstan's RC Primary School, Wolstanton
- Ss Peter and Paul RC Primary School, Lichfield

==== Stockport ====
- Cheadle RC Infant School, Cheadle Hulme
- Cheadle RC Junior School, Cheadle Hulme
- Our Lady's RC Primary School, Stockport
- St Ambrose RC Primary School, Stockport
- St Bernadette's RC Primary School, Brinnington
- St Christopher's RC Primary School, Romiley
- St Joseph's RC Primary School, Stockport
- St Joseph's RC Primary School, Stockport
- St Mary's RC Academy, Marple Bridge
- St Mary's RC Primary School, Stockport
- St Peter's RC Primary School, Hazel Grove
- St Philip's RC Primary School, Stockport
- St Simon's RC Primary School, Hazel Grove
- St Winifred's RC Primary School, Stockport

==== Stockton-on-Tees ====
- Christ The King RC Primary School, Thornaby-on-Tees
- Our Lady of the Most Holy Rosary RC Academy, Billingham
- St Bede's RC Academy, Stockton
- St Cuthbert's RC Primary School, Stockton
- St Gregory's RC Academy, Stockton
- St John the Evangelist RC Primary School, Billingham
- St Joseph's RC Academy, Norton
- St Joseph's RC Primary School, Billingham
- St Patrick's RC Primary School, Stockton
- St Patrick's RC Primary School, Thornaby
- St Paul's RC Primary School, Billingham
- St Therese of Lisieux RC Primary School, Ingleby Barwick

==== Stoke-on-Trent ====
- Our Lady and St Benedict RC Academy
- Our Lady's RC Academy
- St Augustine's RC Academy
- St George and St Martin's RC Academy
- St Gregory's RC Academy
- St Joseph's RC Academy
- St Maria Goretti RC Academy
- St Mary's RC Academy
- St Peter's RC Academy
- St Teresa's RC Primary School
- St Thomas Aquinas RC Primary School
- St Wilfrid's RC Academy

==== Suffolk ====
- St Benet's RC Primary School, Beccles
- St Edmund's RC Primary School, Bungay
- St Edmund's RC Primary School, Bury St Edmunds
- St Felix RC Primary School, Haverhill
- St Joseph's RC Primary School, Sudbury
- St Louis RC Academy, Newmarket
- St Mark's RC Primary School, Ipswich
- St Mary's RC Primary School, Ipswich
- St Mary's RC Primary School, Lowestoft
- St Pancras RC Primary School, Ipswich

==== Sunderland ====
- English Martyrs' RC Primary School, Sunderland
- Our Lady Queen of Peace RC Primary School, Houghton-le-Spring
- St Anne's RC Primary School, Sunderland
- St Bede's RC Primary School, Washington
- St Benet's RC Primary School, Sunderland
- St Cuthbert's RC Primary School, Sunderland
- St John Bosco RC Primary School, Sunderland
- St John Boste RC Primary School, Washington
- St Joseph's RC Primary School, Sunderland
- St Joseph's RC Primary School, Washington
- St Leonard's RC Primary School, Sunderland
- St Mary's RC Primary School, Sunderland
- St Michael's RC Primary School, Houghton-le-Spring
- St Patrick's RC Primary School, Sunderland

==== Surrey ====
- Cardinal Newman RC Primary School, Hersham
- Holy Family RC Primary School, Addlestone
- The Marist RC Primary School, West Byfleet
- Our Lady of the Rosary RC Primary School, Staines-upon-Thames
- St Anne's RC Primary School, Banstead
- St Anne's RC Primary School, Chertsey
- St Augustine's RC Primary School, Frimley
- St Charles Borromeo RC Primary School, Weybridge
- St Clement's RC Primary School, Ewell
- St Cuthbert Mayne RC Primary School, Cranleigh
- St Cuthbert's RC Primary School, Englefield Green
- St Dunstan's RC Primary School, Woking
- St Edmund's RC Primary School, Godalming
- St Francis RC Primary School, Caterham
- St Hugh of Lincoln RC Primary School, Woking
- St Ignatius RC Primary School, Sunbury-on-Thames
- St Joseph's RC Primary School, Dorking
- St Joseph's RC Primary School, Epsom
- St Joseph's RC Primary School, Guildford
- St Joseph's RC Primary School,Redhill
- St Michael RC Primary School, Ashford
- St Paul's RC Primary School, Thames Ditton
- St Peter's RC Primary School, Leatherhead
- St Polycarp's RC Primary School, Farnham
- St Thomas of Canterbury RC Primary School, Merrow

==== Sutton ====
- St Cecilia's RC Primary School
- St Dunstan's Primary School
- St Elphege's RC Infants' School
- St Elphege's RC Junior School
- St Mary's RC Infants' School
- St Mary's RC Junior School

==== Swindon ====
- Holy Cross RC Primary School
- Holy Family RC Primary School
- Holy Rood RC Primary School
- St Catherine's RC Primary School
- St Mary's RC Primary School

==== Tameside ====
- Our Lady of Mount Carmel RC Primary School, Ashton-under-Lyne
- St Anne's RC Primary School, Audenshaw
- St Christopher's RC Primary School, Ashton-under-Lyne
- St James' RC Primary School,Hyde
- St John Fisher RC Primary School, Denton
- St Joseph's RC Primary School, Mossley
- St Mary's RC Primary School, Denton
- St Mary's RC Primary School, Dukinfield
- St Paul's RC Primary School, Hyde
- St Peter's RC Primary School, Stalybridge
- St Raphael's RC Primary School, Millbrook
- St Stephen's RC Primary School, Droylsden

==== Telford and Wrekin ====
- St Luke's RC Primary School, Telford
- St Mary's RC Primary School, Telford
- St Matthew's CE Primary School, Telford
- St Patrick's RC Primary School, Telford
- St Peter and Paul RC Primary School, Newport

==== Thurrock ====
- Holy Cross RC Primary School, South Ockendon
- St Joseph's RC Primary School, Stanford-le-Hope
- St Mary's RC Primary School, Tilbury
- St Thomas of Canterbury RC Primary School, Grays

==== Torbay ====
- Our Lady of the Angels RC Primary School, Torquay
- Priory RC Primary School, Torquay
- Sacred Heart Catholic RC School, Paignton
- St Margaret Clitherow RC Primary School, Brixham

==== Tower Hamlets ====
- English Martyrs RC Primary School
- Our Lady and St Joseph RC School
- St Agnes RC Primary School
- St Anne's and Guardian Angels RC Primary School
- St Edmund's RC School
- St Elizabeth RC Primary School

==== Trafford ====
- All Saints' RC Primary School, Sale
- English Martyrs RC Primary School, Urmston
- Holy Family RC Primary School, Sale
- Our Lady of Lourdes RC Primary School, Partington
- Our Lady of the Rosary RC Primary School, Urmston
- St Alphonsus' RC Primary School, Stretford
- St Ann's RC Primary, Stretford
- St Hugh of Lincoln RC Primary School, Stretford
- St Hugh's RC Primary School, Timperley
- St Joseph's RC Primary School, Sale
- St Margaret Ward RC Primary School, Sale
- St Monica's RC Primary School, Urmston
- St Teresa's RC Primary School, Stretford
- St Vincent's RC Primary School, Altrincham

==== Wakefield ====
- English Martyrs RC Primary School, Wakefield
- Holy Family and St Michael's RC Primary School, Pontefract
- Sacred Heart RC Primary School, Hemsworth
- St Austin's RC Primary School, Wakefield
- St Ignatius RC Primary School, Ossett
- St John the Baptist RC Primary School, Normanton
- St Joseph's RC Primary School, Castleford
- St Joseph's RC Primary School, South Elmsall
- St Joseph's RC Primary School, Pontefract

==== Walsall ====
- St Anne's RC Primary School, Streetly
- St Bernadette's RC Primary School, Brownhills
- St Francis RC Primary School, Shelfield
- St James Primary School, Brownhills
- St Joseph's RC Primary School, Darlaston
- St Mary of the Angels RC Primary School, Aldridge
- St Mary's The Mount RC Primary School, Walsall
- St Patrick's RC Primary School, Walsall
- St Peter's RC Primary School, Walsall
- St Thomas of Canterbury RC Primary School, Walsall

==== Waltham Forest ====
- Our Lady & St George's RC Primary School
- St Joseph's RC Infant School
- St Joseph's RC Junior School
- St Mary's RC Primary School
- St Patrick's RC Primary School

==== Wandsworth ====
- Holy Ghost RC Primary School
- Our Lady of Victories RC Primary School
- Our Lady Queen of Heaven RC Primary School
- Sacred Heart RC Primary School
- Sacred Heart RC Primary School
- St Anselm's RC Primary School
- St Boniface RC Primary School
- St Joseph's RC Primary School
- St Mary's RC Primary School

==== Warrington ====
- Our Lady's RC Primary School, Warrington
- Sacred Heart RC Primary School, Warrington
- St Alban's RC Primary School, Warrington
- St Augustine's RC Primary School, Warrington
- St Benedict's RC Primary School, Warrington
- St Bridget's RC Primary School, Warrington
- St Joseph's RC Primary School, Warrington
- St Lewis' RC Primary School, Croft
- St Monica's RC Primary School, Appleton Thorn
- St Oswald's RC Primary School, Warrington
- St Paul of The Cross RC Primary School, Warrington
- St Peter's RC Primary School, Warrington
- St Stephen's RC Primary School, Warrington
- St Vincent's RC Primary School, Warrington

==== Warwickshire ====
- English Martyrs RC Primary School, Rugby
- Our Lady & St Joseph RC Academy, Nuneaton
- Our Lady & St Teresa's RC Primary School, Cubbington
- Our Lady's RC Primary School, Alcester
- Our Lady's RC Primary School, Princethorpe
- St Anne's RC Academy, Nuneaton
- St Anthony's RC Primary School, Leamington Spa
- St Augustine's RC Primary School, Kenilworth
- St Benedict's RC Primary Academy, Atherstone
- St Edward's RC Primary School, Coleshill
- St Francis RC Academy, Bedworth
- St Gregory's RC Primary School, Stratford-upon-Avon
- St Joseph's RC Primary School, Whitnash
- St Marie's RC Primary School, Rugby
- St Mary Immaculate Catholic Primary School
- St Mary's RC Primary School, Henley-in-Arden
- St Mary's RC Primary School, Southam
- St Mary's RC Primary School, Studley
- St Patrick's RC Primary School, Leamington Spa
- St Peter's RC Primary School, Leamington Spa

==== West Berkshire ====
- St Finian's RC Primary School, Cold Ash
- St Joseph's RC Primary School, Newbury
- St Paul's RC Primary School, Tilehurst

==== West Northamptonshire ====
- The Good Shepherd RC Primary School, Northampton
- St Gregory's RC Primary School, Northampton
- St Mary's RC Primary School, Aston le Walls
- St Mary's RC Primary School, Northampton

==== West Sussex ====
- English Martyrs RC Primary School, Goring-by-Sea
- Our Lady Queen of Heaven RC Primary School, Crawley
- St Catherine's RC Primary School, Littlehampton
- St Francis of Assisi RC Primary School, Crawley
- St John's RC Primary School, Horsham
- St Joseph's RC Primary School, Haywards Heath
- St Mary's RC Primary School, Bognor Regis
- St Mary's RC Primary School, Worthing
- St Peter's RC Primary School, Shoreham-by-Sea
- St Philip's RC Primary School, Arundel
- St Richard's RC Primary School, Chichester
- St Robert Southwell RC Primary School, Horsham
- St Wilfrid's RC Primary School, Angmering
- St Wilfrid's RC Primary School, Burgess Hill

==== Westminster ====
- Our Lady Of Dolours RC Primary School
- St Edward's RC Primary School
- St Joseph's RC Primary School
- St Mary of the Angels RC Primary School
- St Vincent De Paul RC Primary School
- St Vincent's RC Primary School

==== Westmorland and Furness ====
- Dean Gibson RC Primary School, Kendal
- Holy Family RC Primary School, Newbarns
- Our Lady of the Rosary RC Primary School, Dalton-in-Furness
- Sacred Heart RC Primary School, Barrow-in-Furness
- St Catherine's RC Primary School, Penrith
- St Cuthbert's RC Primary School, Windermere
- St Mary's RC Primary School, Ulverston
- St Pius X RC Primary School, Barrow-in-Furness

==== Wigan ====
- All Saints' RC Primary School, Golborne
- Holy Family RC Primary School, Boothstown
- Holy Family RC Primary School, Platt Bridge
- Holy Family RC Primary School, Wigan
- Our Lady's RC Primary School, Aspull
- Sacred Heart RC Primary School, Hindley Green
- Sacred Heart RC Primary School, Atherton
- Sacred Heart RC Primary School, Leigh
- Sacred Heart RC Primary School, Wigan
- St Aidan's RC Primary School, Wigan
- St Ambrose Barlow RC Primary School, Astley
- St Benedict's RC Primary School, Hindley
- St Bernadette's RC Primary School, Shevington
- St Catherine's RC Primary School, Lowton
- St Cuthbert's RC Primary School, Wigan
- St Gabriel's RC Primary School, Leigh
- St James' RC Primary School, Orrell, Greater Manchester
- St Joseph's RC Primary School, Leigh
- St Jude's RC Primary School, Wigan
- St Marie's RC Primary School, Standish
- St Mary and St John RC Primary School, Wigan
- St Oswald's RC Primary School, Ashton-in-Makerfield
- St Patrick's RC Primary School, Wigan
- St Richard's RC Primary School, Atherton
- Twelve Apostles RC Primary School, Leigh

==== Wiltshire ====
- Christ The King RC School, Amesbury
- St Edmund's RC Primary School, Calne
- St George's RC Primary School, Warminster
- St John's RC Primary School, Trowbridge
- St Joseph's RC Primary School, Devizes
- St Joseph's RC Primary School, Malmesbury
- St Mary's RC Primary School, Chippenham
- St Osmund's RC Primary School, Salisbury
- St Patrick's RC Primary School, Corsham
- Wardour RC Primary School, Wardour

==== Windsor and Maidenhead ====
- St Edmund Campion RC Primary School, Maidenhead
- St Edward's RC First School, Windsor
- St Francis RC Primary School, Ascot
- St Mary's RC Primary School, Maidenhead

==== Wirral ====
- Christ The King RC Primary School, Bromborough
- Holy Cross RC Primary School, Birkenhead
- Holy Spirit RC/CE Primary School, Leasowe (RC & CE)
- Ladymount RC Primary School, Pensby
- Our Lady and St Edward's RC Primary School, Birkenhead
- Our Lady of Pity RC Primary School, Greasby
- Sacred Heart RC Primary School, Moreton
- St Alban's RC Primary School, Wallasey
- St Anne's RC Primary School, Birkenhead
- St John's RC Infant School, Bebington
- St John's RC Junior School, Bebington
- St Joseph's RC Primary School, Birkenhead
- St Joseph's RC Primary School, Birkenhead
- St Joseph's RC Primary School, Wallasey
- St Michaels and All Angels RC Primary School, Birkenhead
- St Paul's RC Primary School, Birkenhead
- St Peter's RC Primary School, Birkenhead
- St Werburgh's RC Primary School, Birkenhead
- SS Peter and Paul RC Primary School, Wallasey

==== Wokingham ====
- St Dominic Savio RC Primary School, Woodley
- St Teresa's RC Academy, Wokingham

==== Wolverhampton ====
- Corpus Christi RC Primary Academy
- Holy Rosary RC Primary Academy
- Holy Trinity RC Primary School
- St Anthony's RC Primary Academy
- St Mary's RC Primary School
- St Michael's RC Primary Academy
- St Patrick's RC Primary Academy
- St Teresa's RC Primary Academy]
- SS Mary and John's RC Primary Academy
- SS Peter and Paul RC Primary Academy

==== Worcestershire ====
- Holy Redeemer RC Primary School, Pershore
- Our Lady of Mount Carmel RC First School, Redditch (4-9 First School)
- Our Lady Queen of Peace RC Primary School, Worcester
- St George's RC Primary School, Worcester
- St Joseph's RC Primary School, Droitwich Spa
- St Joseph's RC Primary School, Malvern
- St Joseph's RC Primary School, Worcester
- St Mary's RC Primary School, Broadway
- St Mary's RC Primary School, Evesham
- St Peter's RC First School, Bromsgrove (4-9 First School)
- St Thomas More RC First School, Redditch (4-9 First School)
- St Wulstan's RC Primary School, Stourport-on-Severn

==== York ====
- Our Lady Queen of Martyrs RC Primary School
- St Aelred's RC Primary School
- St George's RC Primary School
- St Wilfrid's RC Primary School

=== Wales ===
==== Anglesey ====
- Ysgol Santes Fair

==== Bridgend ====
- All Saints RC Primary School
- Brynmawr RC Primary School
- St Joseph's RC Primary School

==== Bridgend ====
- St Mary's & St Patrick's RC Primary School
- St Mary's Bridgend RC Primary School
- St Roberts RC Primary School

==== Caerphilly ====
- St Helens RC Primary School

==== Cardiff ====
- Christ The King RC Primary School
- Holy Family RC Primary School
- St Alban's RC Primary School
- St Bernadette's RC Primary School
- St Cadoc's RC Primary School
- St Cuthbert's RC Primary School
- St Francis RC Primary School
- St John Lloyd RC Primary School
- St Joseph's RC Primary School
- St Mary's RC Primary School
- St Patrick's RC Primary School
- St Peter's RC Primary School
- St Philip Evans RC Primary School

==== Carmarthenshire ====
- St Mary's RC Primary School
- St Mary's RC Primary School

==== Ceredigion ====
- St Padarn Primary School

==== Conwy ====
- Ysgol Bendigaid William Davies
- Ysgol Sant Joseff

==== Denbighshire ====
- Christ the Word Catholic School

==== Flintshire ====
- St Anthony's RC Primary School
- St David's RC Primary School
- St Mary's RC Primary School
- St Winefride's RC Primary School
- Venerable Edward Morgan RC Primary School

==== Gwynedd ====
- Ysgol Ein Harglwyddes

==== Merthyr Tydfil ====
(All part of Blessed Carlo Acutis Catholic School)

- St Aloysius RC Primary School
- St Illtyd's RC Primary School
- St Mary's RC Primary School

==== Monmouthshire ====
- Our Lady and St Michael's RC Primary School
- St Marys RC Primary School

==== Neath Port Talbot ====
- St Joseph's RC Infant School
- St Joseph's RC Junior School
- St Joseph's RC Primary School
- St Therese's Catholic Primary School

==== Newport ====
- St David's Primary School
- St Gabriel's RC Primary School
- St Joseph's RC Primary School
- St Mary's RC Primary School
- St Michael's RC Primary School
- St Patrick's RC Primary School

==== Pembrokeshire ====
- Holy Name RC Primary School
- Mary Immaculate RC Primary School
- St Francis RC Primary School
- St Mary's RC Primary School
- St Teilo's RC Primary School

==== Powys ====
- St. Mary's RC Primary School

==== Rhondda Cynon Taff ====
- Our Lady's RC Primary School
- SS Gabriel & Raphael RC Primary School
- St Margaret's Catholic Primary School

==== Swansea ====
- St David's RC Primary School
- St Illtyd's RC Primary School
- St Joseph's Primary RC School Clydach
- St Joseph's RC Cathedral Primary School

==== Torfaen ====
- Our Lady of the Angels RC Primary School
- Padre Pio RC Primary School
- St Davids RC Primary School

==== Vale of Glamorgan ====
- St Helen's RC Infant School
- St Helen's RC Junior School
- St Joseph's RC Primary School

==== Wrexham ====
- St Anne's RC Primary School
- St Mary's RC Primary School

=== Scotland ===
==== Aberdeen ====
- Holy Family RC Primary School
- St Joseph’s RC Primary School
- St Peter's Roman Catholic Primary School, Aberdeen

==== Angus ====
- St Margaret's RC Primary School
- St Thomas' RC Primary School

==== Argyll and Bute ====
- St Andrew's Primary School
- St Columba's Primary School
- St Joseph's Primary School
- St Mun's Primary School

==== Clackmannanshire ====
- St Bernadette's RC Primary
- St Mungo's RC Primary School

==== Dumfries and Galloway ====
- St Andrew's RC School
- St Columba's RC School
- St Joseph's RC School
- St Teresa's RC School

==== Dundee ====
- Our Lady's RC Primary School
- St Andrew's RC Primary School
- St Clement's RC Primary School
- St Fergus' RC Primary School
- St Francis RC Primary School
- St Joseph's RC Primary School
- St Mary's RC Primary School
- St Ninian's RC Primary School
- St Peter & Paul RC School
- St Pius' RC Primary School

==== East Ayrshire ====
- Mount Carmel Primary School
- St Andrew's Primary School
- St Patrick's Primary School
- St Sophia's Primary School
- St Xavier's Primary School

==== East Dumbartonshire ====
- Holy Family Primary School
- Holy Trinity Primary School
- St Helen's Primary School
- St Machan's Primary School
- St Matthew's Primary School
- St Nicholas' Primary School

==== East Lothian ====
- Loretto RC Primary School
- St Gabriel's RC Primary School
- St Martin's RC Primary School
- St Mary's RC Primary School

==== East Renfrewshire ====
- Our Lady Of The Missions Primary School
- St Cadoc's Primary School
- St Clare's Primary School
- St John's Primary School
- St Joseph's Primary School
- St Mark's Primary School
- St Thomas' Primary School

==== Edinburgh ====
- Holy Cross RC Primary School
- St Andrew's Fox Covert RC Primary School
- St Catherine's RC Primary School
- St Cuthbert's RC Primary School
- St David's RC Primary School
- St Francis' RC Primary School
- St John Vianney RC Primary School
- St John's RC Primary School
- St Joseph's RC Primary School
- St Margaret's RC Primary School
- St Mark's RC Primary School
- St Mary's RC Primary School (Edinburgh)
- St Mary's RC Primary School (Leith)
- St Ninian's RC Primary School
- St Peter's RC Primary School

==== Falkirk ====
- Sacred Heart RC Primary School
- St Andrew's RC Primary School
- St Bernadette's RC Primary School
- St Francis Xavier's RC Primary School
- St Joseph's RC Primary School
- St Mary's RC Primary School
- St Patrick's RC Primary School

==== Fife ====
- Greyfriars RC Primary School
- Holy Name RC Primary School
- St Agatha's R C Primary
- St Bride's R C Primary School
- St Columba's R C Primary School
- St John's R C Primary School
- St Joseph's R C Primary School
- St Kenneth's R C Primary School
- St Margaret's R C Primary School
- St Marie's R C Primary School
- St Ninian's R C Primary School
- St Patrick's R C Primary School
- St Paul's R C Primary School
- St Serf's R C Primary School

==== Glasgow ====
- Corpus Christi Primary School
- Holy Cross Primary School
- John Paul II Primary School
- Notre Dame Primary School
- Our Lady of Lourdes Primary School & Nursery Class
- Our Lady of Peace Primary School
- Our Lady Of The Annunciation Primary School
- Our Lady Of The Rosary Primary School & Nursery Class
- Sacred Heart Primary School
- St Albert's Primary School
- St Angela's Primary School & Nursery Class
- St Anne's Primary School
- St Bartholomew's Primary School
- St Benedict's Primary School
- St Bernard's Primary School
- St Blane's Primary School
- St Brendan's Primary School
- St Bride's Primary School
- St Bridget's Primary School & Nursery Class
- St Brigid's Primary School
- St Catherine's Primary School
- St Charles' Primary School
- St Clare's Primary School
- St Constantine's Primary School & Nursery Class
- St Conval's Primary School
- St Cuthbert's Primary School
- St Denis' Primary School
- St Fillan's Primary School & Nursery Class
- St Francis Of Assisi Primary School
- St Francis' Primary School & Nursery Class
- St George's Primary School
- St Joachim's Primary School
- St Joseph's Primary School
- St Maria Goretti Primary School
- St Marnock's Primary School
- St Martha's Primary School
- St Martin's Primary School
- St Mary's Primary School
- St Michael's Primary School
- St Mirin's Primary School
- St Monica's (Milton) Primary School
- St Monica's Primary School
- St Mungo's Primary School & Nursery Class
- St Ninian's Primary School
- St Patrick's Primary School
- St Paul's (Shettleston) Primary School & Nursery Class
- St Paul's (Whiteinch) Primary School
- St Philomena's Primary School
- St Roch's Primary School
- St Rose Of Lima Primary School
- St Saviour's Primary School
- St Teresa's Primary School
- St Thomas' Primary School
- St Timothy's Primary School & Nursery Class
- St Vincent's Primary School

==== Highland ====
- St Columba's RC Primary School
- St Joseph's RC Primary

==== Inverclyde ====
- All Saints Primary School
- St Andrew's Primary School
- St Francis' Primary School
- St John's Primary School
- St Joseph's Primary School
- St Mary's Primary School
- St Michael's Primary School
- St Ninian's Primary School
- St Patrick's Primary School

==== Midlothian ====
- Sacred Heart Primary School
- St Andrew's Primary School
- St David's RC Primary School
- St Luke's Primary School
- St Mary's Primary School
- St Matthew's Primary School

==== Moray ====
- St Peter's RC Primary School
- St Sylvester's RC Primary School
- St Thomas RC Primary School

==== North Ayrshire ====
- St Anthony's Primary School
- St Bridget's Primary School
- St John Ogilvie Primary School
- St John's Primary School
- St Luke's Primary School
- St Mark's Primary School
- St Mary's Primary School
- St Palladius' Primary School
- St Peter's Primary School
- St Winning's Primary School

==== North Lanarkshire ====
- All Saints Primary School
- Cathedral Primary School
- Christ The King Primary
- Corpus Christi Primary School
- Holy Cross Primary School
- Holy Family Primary School
- Our Lady & St Francis Primary School
- Our Lady & St Joseph's Primary School
- Sacred Heart Primary School
- St Aidan's Primary School
- St Aloysius' Primary School
- St Andrew's Primary School (Airdrie)
- St Andrew's Primary School (Cumbernauld)
- St Augustine's Primary School
- St Barbara's Primary School
- St Bartholomew's Primary School
- St Bernadette's Primary
- St Bernard's Primary School
- St Brendan's Primary School
- St Brigid's Primary School
- St David's Primary School
- St Dominic's Primary School
- St Edward's Primary School
- St Gerard's Primary School
- St Helen's Primary School
- St Ignatius' Primary School
- St John Paul II Primary
- St Joseph's Primary School
- St Kevin's Primary School
- St Lucy's Primary School
- St Margaret of Scotland Primary School
- St Mary's Primary School (Caldercruix)
- St Mary's Primary School (Cleland)
- St Mary's Primary School (Coatbridge)
- St Mary's Primary School (Cumbernauld)
- St Michael's Primary School
- St Monica's Primary School
- St Patrick's Primary School (Coatbridge)
- St Patrick's Primary School (Kilsyth)
- St Patrick's Primary School (New Stevenston)
- St Patrick's Primary School (Shotts)
- St Serf's Primary School
- St Stephen's Primary School
- St Teresa's Primary School
- St Thomas' Primary School
- St Timothy's Primary School

==== Perth and Kinross ====
- Our Lady's RC Primary School
- St Dominic's RC Primary School
- St Stephen's RC Primary School
- St John's RC Academy

==== Renfrewshire ====
- Our Lady Of Peace Primary School
- St Anne's Primary School
- St Anthony's Primary School
- St Catherine's Primary School
- St Charles' Primary School
- St David's Primary School
- St Fergus Primary School
- St Fillan's Primary School
- St James's Primary School (Paisley)
- St James's Primary School (Renfrew)
- St John Bosco Primary School
- St John Ogilvie Primary School
- St Margaret's Primary School
- St Mary's Primary School
- St Paul's Primary School
- St Peter's Primary School

==== Scottish Borders ====
- Halyrude Primary School
- St Margaret's RC Primary School (Galashiels)

==== South Ayrshire ====
- Sacred Heart Primary School
- St Cuthbert's Primary School
- St John's Primary School
- St Ninian's Primary School
- St Patrick's Primary School

==== South Lanarkshire ====
- Our Lady and St Anne's Primary School
- Our Lady Of Lourdes Primary School
- St Anthony's Primary School
- St Athanasius' Primary School
- St Blane's Primary School
- St Bride's Primary School (Bothwell)
- St Bride's Primary School (Cambuslang)
- St Cadoc's Primary School
- St Charles Primary School
- St Columbkille's Primary School
- St Cuthbert's Primary School
- St Elizabeth's Primary School
- St Hilary's Primary School
- St John The Baptist Primary School
- St John's Primary School (Blackwood)
- St Joseph's Primary School
- St Kenneth's Primary School
- St Leonard's Primary School
- St Louise's Primary School
- St Mark's Primary School (Hamilton)
- St Mark's Primary School (Rutherglen)
- St Mary's Primary School (Hamilton)
- St Mary's Primary School (Lanark)
- St Mary's Primary School (Larkhall)
- St Ninian's Primary School
- St Patrick's Primary School
- St Paul's Primary School
- St Peter's Primary School
- St Vincent's Primary School

==== Stirling ====
- Our Lady's RC Primary School
- St Margaret's RC Primary
- St Mary's RC Primary School

==== West Dumbartonshire ====
- Our Holy Redeemer Primary School
- Our Lady of Loretto Primary School
- St Eunan's Primary School
- St Joseph's Primary School
- St Kessog's Primary School
- St Martin's Primary School
- St Mary's Primary School (Alexandria)
- St Mary's Primary School (Duntocher)
- St Michael's Primary School
- St Patrick's Primary School
- St Peter's Primary School
- St Ronan's Primary School
- St Stephen's Primary School

==== West Lothian ====
- Holy Family Primary School
- Howden St Andrew's Primary School
- Our Lady Of Lourdes Primary School
- Our Lady's Primary School
- St Anthony's Primary School
- St Columba's Primary School
- St John Ogilvie Primary School
- St John The Baptist Primary School
- St Joseph's Primary School (Linlithgow)
- St Joseph's Primary School (Whitburn)
- St Mary's Primary School
- St Mary's RC Primary School
- St Nicholas Primary School
- St Ninian's Primary School
- St Paul's Primary School
- St Thomas' Primary School

== State Secondary Schools ==
The Catholic Education Service provides the central co-ordination under the Bishops' Conference for Catholic schools in England and Wales. In England and Wales, Catholic schools come under the jurisdiction of their local diocese who can inspect the religious education and acts of worship of the school under Section 48 of the Education Act 2005. Many schools were also founded by religious orders who continue to maintain a presence, property ownership or trusteeship of their schools.

In England and Wales there are joint Anglican and Catholic schools. These include primary schools such as: All Saints, Cambridge; The Bishops’ School, Chelmsford; Emmaus School, Liverpool; The Faith School, Liverpool; St John's Sunderland; Christ the King, Macclesfield. There is a joint middle school: St Edward's Royal Free School, Windsor. Joint secondary schools and academies include: St Cuthbert Mayne School, Torquay; St Augustine, Taunton; St Bede, Cambridge; St Bede, Redhill; St Michael, Barnsley; St Edward, Poole; St Francis Xavier High School, Richmond, North Yorkshire; Emmaus, Sheffield; Holy Family College, Heywood, Rochdale; Christ's College, Cheltenham; St Francis of Assisi, Liverpool; St Chad's, Runcorn. In 2006, the first joint Church in Wales and Catholic school was opened in Wales: St Joseph's, Wrexham.

=== England ===
List of Catholic Secondary Schools in England, alphabetically by Education Authority.

==== Barking and Dagenham ====
- All Saint's Catholic School, London (Diocese of Brentwood)

==== Barnet ====
- Bishop Douglass Catholic School, London (Archdiocese of Westminster)
- Finchley Catholic High School, London (Boys) (Archdiocese of Westminster)
- St James' Catholic High School, London (Archdiocese of Westminster)
- St Michael's Catholic Grammar School (Girl's Grammar) (Archdiocese of Westminster)

==== Barnsley ====
- Holy Trinity Catholic and Church of England School, Barnsley (Catholic and CE) (Diocese of Hallam)

==== Bath and North East Somerset ====
- Saint Gregory's Catholic College, Bath (Diocese of Clifton)

==== Bedford ====
- St Thomas More Catholic School, Bedford (Diocese of Northampton)

==== Bexley ====
- St Catherine's Catholic School for Girls, London (Girls) (Archdiocese of Southwark)
- St Columba's Catholic Boys' School, London (Boys) (Archdiocese of Southwark)

==== Birmingham ====
- Archbishop Ilsley Catholic School, Birmingham (Diocese of Birmingham)
- Bishop Challoner Catholic College, Birmingham (Diocese of Birmingham)
- Bishop Walsh Catholic School, Sutton Coldfield (Diocese of Birmingham)
- Cardinal Wiseman Catholic School, Birmingham (Diocese of Birmingham)
- Holy Trinity Catholic School, Birmingham (Diocese of Birmingham)
- St Edmund Campion Catholic School, Birmingham (Diocese of Birmingham)
- St John Wall Catholic School, Birmingham (Diocese of Birmingham)
- St Paul's School for Girls, Birmingham (Girls) (Diocese of Birmingham)
- St Thomas Aquinas Catholic School, Birmingham (Diocese of Birmingham)

==== Blackburn with Darwen ====
- Our Lady and St John Catholic College, Blackburn (Diocese of Salford)
- St Bede's Roman Catholic High School, Blackburn (Diocese of Salford)

==== Blackpool ====
- St Mary's Catholic Academy, Blackpool (Diocese of Lancaster)

==== Bolton ====
- Mount St Joseph School, Farnworth (Diocese of Salford)
- St Joseph's Roman Catholic High School, Horwich (Diocese of Salford)
- Thornleigh Salesian College, Bolton (Diocese of Salford)

==== Bournemouth, Christchurch and Poole ====
- St Edward's Roman Catholic/Church of England School, Poole (Catholic and CE)
- St Peter's Catholic School, Bournemouth (Diocese of Portsmouth)

==== Bradford ====
- Holy Family Catholic School, Keighley (Diocese of Leeds)
- St Bede's and St Joseph's Catholic College, Bradford (Diocese of Leeds)

==== Brent ====
- Newman Catholic College, London (Boys) (Archdiocese of Westminster)
- St Claudine's Catholic School for Girls, London (Girls) (Archdiocese of Westminster)
- St Gregory's Catholic Science College, London (Archdiocese of Westminster)

==== Brighton and Hove ====
- Cardinal Newman Catholic School, Hove (Diocese of Arundel and Brighton)

==== Bristol ====
- St Bede's Catholic College, Bristol (Diocese of Clifton)
- St Bernadette Catholic Secondary School, Bristol (Diocese of Clifton)
- St Brendan's Sixth Form College, Bristol (Sixth Form College) (Diocese of Clifton)

==== Buckinghamshire ====
- St Michael's Catholic School, High Wycombe and Aylesbury (Diocese of Northampton)

==== Bury ====
- Holy Cross College, Bury, Bury (Sixth Form College) (Diocese of Salford)
- St Gabriel's Roman Catholic High School, Bury, Bury (Diocese of Salford)
- St Monica's High School, Prestwich (Diocese of Salford)

==== Cambridgeshire ====
- St Bede's Inter-Church School, Cambridge (Catholic and CE) (Diocese of East Anglia)

==== Camden ====
- La Sainte Union Catholic School, London (Girls) (Archdiocese of Westminster)
- Maria Fidelis Roman Catholic Convent School, London (Archdiocese of Westminster)

==== Cheshire East ====
- All Hallows Catholic College, Macclesfield (Diocese of Shrewsbury)
- St Thomas More Catholic School, Crewe (Diocese of Shrewsbury)

==== Cheshire West and Chester ====
- Chester Catholic High School, Chester (Diocese of Shrewsbury)
- Ellesmere Port Catholic High School, Ellesmere Port (Diocese of Shrewsbury)
- St Nicholas Catholic High School, Northwich (Diocese of Shrewsbury)

==== Coventry ====
- Bishop Ullathorne Roman Catholic School, Coventry (Diocese of Birmingham)
- Cardinal Newman Catholic School and Community College, Coventry (Diocese of Birmingham)
- Cardinal Wiseman Catholic School, Coventry (Diocese of Birmingham)

==== Croydon ====
- Coloma Convent Girls' School, London (Girls)
- St Joseph's College, Upper Norwood, London (Boys) (Archdiocese of Southwark)
- St Mary's Catholic High School, Croydon, London(Archdiocese of Southwark)
- Thomas More Catholic School, Purley, London (Archdiocese of Southwark)

==== Cumberland ====
- St Benedict's Catholic High School, Whitehaven (Diocese of Lancaster)
- St John Henry Newman Catholic School, Carlisle (Diocese of Lancaster)
- St Joseph's Catholic High School, Workington (Diocese of Lancaster)

==== Darlington ====
- Carmel College, Darlington (Diocese of Hexham and Newcastle)

==== Derby ====
- Saint Benedict Catholic Voluntary Academy, Derby (Diocese of Nottingham)

==== Derbyshire ====
- St John Houghton Catholic Voluntary Academy, Ilkeston (Diocese of Nottingham)
- St Mary's Catholic High School, Chesterfield (Diocese of Hallam)
- St Philip Howard Catholic Voluntary Academy, Glossop (Diocese of Nottingham)
- St Thomas More Catholic School, Buxton (Diocese of Nottingham)

==== Doncaster ====
- The McAuley Catholic High School, Doncaster (Diocese of Hallam)

==== Dudley ====
- Bishop Milner Catholic College, Dudley (Diocese of Birmingham)

==== Durham ====
- St Bede's Catholic School and Sixth Form College, Lanchester (Diocese of Hexham and Newcastle)
- St Bede's Catholic School, Peterlee (Diocese of Hexham and Newcastle)
- St John's Catholic School, Bishop Auckland (Diocese of Hexham and Newcastle)
- St Leonard's Catholic School, Durham (Diocese of Hexham and Newcastle)

==== Ealing ====
- The Cardinal Wiseman Catholic School, London (Archdiocese of Westminster)

==== East Sussex ====
- St Richard's Catholic College, Bexhill-on-Sea (Diocese of Arundel and Brighton)

==== Enfield ====
- St Anne's Catholic High School, London (Girls) (Archdiocese of Westminster)
- St Ignatius College, London (Boys) (Archdiocese of Westminster)

==== Essex ====
- Brentwood Ursuline Convent High School, Brentwood (Girls) (Diocese of Brentwood)
- De La Salle School, Basildon (Diocese of Brentwood)
- St Benedict's Catholic College, Colchester (Diocese of Brentwood)
- St John Payne Catholic School, Chelmsford (Diocese of Brentwood)
- St Mark's West Essex Catholic School, Harlow (Diocese of Brentwood)

==== Gateshead ====
- Cardinal Hume Catholic School, Gateshead (Diocese of Hexham and Newcastle)
- St Thomas More Catholic School, Blaydon (Diocese of Hexham and Newcastle)

==== Gloucestershire ====
- St Peter's High School, Gloucester (Diocese of Clifton)

==== Greenwich ====
- St Paul's Academy, London (Archdiocese of Southwark)
- St Thomas More Catholic School, London (Archdiocese of Southwark)
- St Ursula's Convent School, London (Archdiocese of Southwark)

==== Hackney ====
- All Saint's Catholic High School, London (Archdiocese of Westminster)
- Cardinal Pole Catholic School, London (Archdiocese of Westminster)

==== Halton ====
- Blessed Carlo Acutis Catholic and Church of England Academy, Widnes (Catholic and CE)
- Saints Peter and Paul Catholic High School, Runcorn (Archdiocese of Liverpool)

==== Hammersmith and Fulham ====
- London Oratory School, London (Boys) (Archdiocese of Westminster)
- Sacred Heart High School, London (Girls) (Archdiocese of Westminster)

==== Hampshire ====
- Bishop Challoner Catholic Secondary School, Basingstoke (Diocese of Portsmouth)
- Oaklands Catholic School, Waterlooville (Diocese of Portsmouth)

==== Haringey ====
- St Thomas More Catholic School, London (Archdiocese of Westminster)

==== Harrow ====
- Sacred Heart Language College, London (Archdiocese of Westminster)
- Salvatorian College, London (Archdiocese of Westminster)
- St Dominic's Sixth Form College, London (Sixth Form College) (Archdiocese of Westminster)

==== Hartlepool ====
- English Martyrs School and Sixth Form College, Hartlepool (Diocese of Hexham and Newcastle)

==== Havering ====
- The Campion School, London (Diocese of Brentwood)
- Sacred Heart of Mary Girls' School, London(Diocese of Brentwood)

==== Herefordshire ====
- St Mary's Roman Catholic High School, Lugwardine (Diocese of Cardiff)

==== Hertfordshire ====
- John F Kennedy Catholic School, Hemel Hempstead (Archdiocese of Westminster)
- Loreto College, St Albans (Archdiocese of Westminster)
- Nicholas Breakspear School, St Albans (Archdiocese of Westminster)
- St Joan of Arc Catholic School, Rickmansworth (Archdiocese of Westminster)
- The Saint John Henry Newman Catholic School, Stevenage (Archdiocese of Westminster)
- St Mary's Catholic School, Bishop’s Stortford (Archdiocese of Westminster)
- St Michael's Catholic High School, Watford (Archdiocese of Westminster)

==== Hillingdon ====
- The Douay Martyrs School, London (Archdiocese of Westminster)

==== Hounslow ====
- Gumley House Convent School, London (Girls) (Archdiocese of Westminster)
- Gunnersbury Catholic School, London (Boys) (Archdiocese of Westminster)
- St Mark's Catholic School, Hounslow, London (Archdiocese of Westminster)

==== Isle of Wight ====
- Christ the King College, Newport (Catholic and CE) (Diocese of Portsmouth)

==== Islington ====
- St Aloysius' College, London (Boys) (Archdiocese of Westminster)

==== Kensington and Chelsea ====
- All Saints Catholic College, London (Archdiocese of Westminster)
- Cardinal Vaughan Memorial School, London (Boys) (Archdiocese of Westminster)
- St Charles Catholic Sixth Form College, London (Sixth Form College) (Diocese of Westminster)
- St Thomas More Language College, London (Archdiocese of Westminster)

==== Kent ====
- St Anselm's Catholic School, Canterbury (Archdiocese of Southwark)
- St Edmund's Catholic School, Dover (Archdiocese of Southwark)
- St Gregory's Catholic School, Royal Tunbridge Wells (Archdiocese of Southwark)
- St John's Catholic Comprehensive School, Gravesend (Archdiocese of Southwark)
- St Simon Stock Catholic School, Maidstone (Archdiocese of Southwark)
- Ursuline College, Westgate-on-Sea (Archdiocese of Southwark)

==== Kingston-upon-Hull ====
- St Mary's College, Kingston-upon-Hull (Diocese of Middlesbrough)

==== Kingston-upon-Thames ====
- Holy Cross School, London (Girls) (Archdiocese of Southwark)
- Richard Challoner School, London (Boys) (Archdiocese of Southwark)

==== Kirklees ====
- All Saints Catholic College, Huddersfield (Diocese of Leeds)
- St John Fisher Catholic Voluntary Academy, Dewsbury (Diocese of Leeds)

==== Knowsley ====
- All Saints Catholic High School, Kirkby (Archdiocese of Liverpool)
- St Edmund Arrowsmith Catholic Academy, Whiston (Archdiocese of Liverpool)

==== Lambeth ====
- Bishop Thomas Grant School, London (Archdiocese of Southwark)
- La Retraite Roman Catholic Girls' School, London (Girls) (Archdiocese of Southwark)

==== Lancashire ====
- All Hallows Catholic High School, Penwortham (Archdiocese of Liverpool)
- All Saints' Catholic High School, Rawtenstall (Diocese of Salford)
- Blessed Trinity Roman Catholic College, Burnley (Diocese of Salford)
- Brownedge St Mary's Catholic High School, Bamber Bridge (Diocese of Salford)
- Cardinal Allen Catholic High School, Fleetwood (Diocese of Lancaster)
- Cardinal Newman College, Preston (Sixth Form College) (Diocese of Lancaster)
- Christ the King Catholic High School, Preston (Diocese of Lancaster)
- Corpus Christi Catholic High School, Fulwood (Diocese of Lancaster)
- Holy Cross Catholic High School, Chorley (Archdiocese of Liverpool)
- Mount Carmel Roman Catholic High School, Accrington (Diocese of Salford)
- Our Lady Queen of Peace Catholic Engineering College, Skelmersdale (Archdiocese of Liverpool)
- Our Lady's Catholic College, Lancaster (Diocese of Lancaster)
- Our Lady's Catholic High School, Fulwood (Diocese of Lancaster)
- St Augustine's Roman Catholic High School, Billington (Diocese of Salford)
- St Bede's Catholic High School, Ormskirk (Archdiocese of Liverpool)
- St Bede's Catholic High School, Lytham St Annes (Diocese of Lancaster)
- St Cecilia's Roman Catholic High School, Longridge (Diocese of Salford)
- St Mary's Catholic High School, Leyland (Archdiocese of Liverpool)
- Ss John Fisher and Thomas More Roman Catholic High School, Colne (Diocese of Salford)

==== Leeds ====
- Cardinal Heenan Catholic High School, Leeds (Diocese of Leeds)
- Corpus Christi Catholic College, Leeds (Diocese of Leeds)
- Mount St Mary's, Leeds, Leeds (Diocese of Leeds)
- Notre Dame Catholic Sixth Form College, Leeds (Sixth Form College) (Diocese of Leeds)
- St Mary's Menston Catholic Voluntary Academy, Menston (Diocese of Leeds)

==== Leicester ====
- English Martyrs Catholic School, Leicester (Diocese of Nottingham)
- St Paul's Catholic School, Leicester (Diocese of Nottingham)

==== Leicestershire ====
- De Lisle College, Loughborough (Diocese of Nottingham)
- St Martin's Catholic Academy, Stoke Golding (Diocese of Nottingham)

==== Lewisham ====
- Bonus Pastor Catholic College, London (Archdiocese of Southwark)
- Christ the King Sixth Form College, London (Sixth Form College) (Diocese of Southwark)
- St Matthew Academy, London (Archdiocese of Southwark)

==== Lincolnshire ====
- St Peter and St Paul's Catholic Voluntary Academy, Lincoln (Diocese of Nottingham)

==== Liverpool ====
- The Academy of St Francis of Assisi, Liverpool (Catholic and CE)
- The Academy of St Nicholas, Liverpool (Catholic and CE) (Archdiocese of Liverpool)
- Archbishop Beck Catholic College, Liverpool (Archdiocese of Liverpool)
- Bellerive FCJ Catholic College, Liverpool (Girls) (Archdiocese of Liverpool)
- Broughton Hall High School, Liverpool (Girls) (Archdiocese of Liverpool)
- Cardinal Heenan Catholic High School, Liverpool (Boys) (Archdiocese of Liverpool)
- Notre Dame Catholic College, Liverpool (Archdiocese of Liverpool)
- St Edward's College, Liverpool (Archdiocese of Liverpool)
- St Francis Xavier's College, Liverpool (Boys) (Archdiocese of Liverpool)
- St John Bosco Arts College, Liverpool (Girls) (Archdiocese of Liverpool)
- St Julie's Catholic High School, Liverpool (Girls) (Archdiocese of Liverpool)

==== Luton ====
- Cardinal Newman Catholic School, Luton (Diocese of Northampton)

==== Manchester ====
- The Barlow Roman Catholic High School, Manchester (Diocese of Salford)
- Loreto College, Manchester (Sixth Form College) (Diocese of Salford)
- Loreton High School, Manchester (Diocese of Salford)
- Our Lady's Roman Catholic High School, Manchester (Diocese of Salford)
- St Matthew's Roman Catholic High School, Manchester (Diocese of Salford)
- St Paul's Catholic High School, Wythenshawe (Diocese of Shrewsbury)
- St Peter's Roman Catholic High School, Manchester (Diocese of Salford)
- Xaverian College, Manchester (Sixth Form College) (Diocese of Salford)

==== Medway ====
- St John Fisher Catholic School, Rochester (Archdiocese of Southwark)

==== Merton ====
- Ursuline High School, London (Girls) (Archdiocese of Southwark)
- Wimbledon College, London (Boys) (Archdiocese of Southwark)

==== Middlesbrough ====
- Trinity Catholic College, Middlesbrough (Diocese of Middlesbrough)

==== Milton Keynes ====
- St Paul's Catholic School, Milton Keynes (Diocese of Northampton)

==== Newcastle-upon-Tyne ====
- Sacred Heart Catholic High School, Newcastle-upon-Tyne (Girls) (Diocese of Hexham and Newcastle)
- St Cuthbert's High School, Newcastle-upon-Tyne (Boys) (Diocese of Hexham and Newcastle)
- St Mary's Catholic School, Newcastle-upon-Tyne (Diocese of Hexham and Newcastle)

==== Newham ====
- St Angela's Ursuline School, London (Girls) (Diocese of Brentwood)
- St Bonaventure's, London (Boys) (Diocese of Brentwood)

==== Norfolk ====
- Notre Dame High School, Norwich (Diocese of East Anglia)

==== North Lincolnshire ====
- St Bede's Catholic Voluntary Academy, Scunthorpe (Diocese of Nottingham)

==== North Tyneside ====
- St Thomas More Roman Catholic Academy, North Shields (Diocese of Hexham and Newcastle)

==== North Yorkshire ====
- St Augustine's Catholic School, Scarborough (Diocese of Middlesbrough)
- St Francis Xavier School, Richmond (Catholic and CE) (Diocese of Middlesbrough)
- St John Fisher Catholic High School, Harrogate (Diocese of Leeds)

==== Northumberland ====
- St Benet Biscop Catholic Academy, Bedlington (Diocese of Hexham and Newcastle)

==== Nottingham ====
- Trinity School, Nottingham (Diocese of Nottingham)

==== Nottinghamshire ====
- All Saints' Catholic Academy, Mansfield (Diocese of Nottingham)
- The Becket School, West Bridgford (Diocese of Nottingham)
- Christ the King Catholic Voluntary Academy, Arnold (Diocese of Nottingham)

==== Oldham ====
- Blessed John Henry Newman Roman Catholic College, Chadderton (Diocese of Salford)

==== Oxfordshire ====
- Blessed George Napier Roman Catholic School, Banbury (Diocese of Birmingham)
- Greyfriars Catholic School, Oxford (Diocese of Birmingham)

==== Peterborough ====
- St John Fisher Catholic High School, Peterborough (Diocese of East Anglia)

==== Plymouth ====
- Notre Dame Catholic School, Plymouth (Girls) (Diocese of Plymouth)
- St Boniface's Catholic College, Plymouth (Boys) (Diocese of Plymouth)

==== Portsmouth ====
- St Edmund's Catholic School, Portsmouth (Diocese of Portsmouth)

==== Reading ====
- Blessed Hugh Faringdon Catholic School, Reading (Diocese of Portsmouth)

==== Redbridge ====
- The Palmer Catholic Academy, London (Diocese of Brentwood)
- Trinity Catholic High School, London (Diocese of Brentwood)
- Ursuline Academy Ilford, London (Girls) (Diocese of Brentwood)

==== Redcar and Cleveland ====
- Sacred Heart Catholic Secondary, Redcar (Diocese of Middlesbrough)
- St Peter's Catholic College, South Bank (Diocese of Middlesbrough)

==== Richmond-upon-Thames ====
- St Richard Reynolds Catholic College, London (Archdiocese of Westminster)

==== Rochdale ====
- Cardinal Langley Roman Catholic High School, Middleton (Diocese of Salford)
- Holy Family Roman Catholic and Church of England College, Heywood (Catholic and CE) (Diocese of Salford)
- St Cuthbert's RC High School, Rochdale (Diocese of Salford)

==== Rotherham ====
- St Bernard's Catholic High School, Rotherham (Diocese of Hallam)
- Saint Pius X Catholic High School, Wath upon Dearne (Diocese of Hallam)

==== Salford ====
- All Hallows Roman Catholic High School, Salford (Diocese of Salford)
- St Ambrose Barlow Roman Catholic High School, Swinton (Diocese of Salford)
- St Patrick's Roman Catholic High School, Eccles (Diocese of Salford)

==== Sandwell ====
- Stuart Bathurst Catholic High School, Wednesbury (Diocese of Birmingham)

==== Sefton ====
- Christ the King Catholic High School, Southport, Southport (Archdiocese of Liverpool)
- Holy Family Catholic High School, Thornton, Crosby (Archdiocese of Liverpool)
- Maricourt Catholic School, Maghull (Archdiocese of Liverpool)
- Sacred Heart Catholic College, Crosby (Archdiocese of Liverpool)
- The Salesian Academy of St John Bosco, Bootle (Archdiocese of Liverpool)

==== Sheffield ====
- All Saints Catholic High School, Sheffield (Diocese of Hallam)
- Notre Dame High School, Sheffield (Diocese of Hallam)

==== Slough ====
- St Bernard's Catholic Grammar School, Slough (Grammar) (Diocese of Northampton)
- St Joseph's Catholic High School, Slough (Diocese of Northampton)

==== Solihull ====
- John Henry Newman Catholic College, Fordbridge (Diocese of Birmingham)
- St Peter's Catholic School, Solihull (Diocese of Birmingham)

==== South Tyneside ====
- St Joseph's Catholic Academy, Hebburn (Diocese of Hexham and Newcastle)
- St Wilfrid's Roman Catholic College, South Shields (Diocese of Hexham and Newcastle)

==== Southampton ====
- St Anne's Catholic School, Southampton (Girls) (Diocese of Portsmouth)
- Saint George Catholic College, Southampton (Diocese of Portsmouth)

==== Southend-on-Sea ====
- St Bernard's High School, Westcliff-on-Sea, Southend-on-Sea (Girls) (Bi-Lateral) (Diocese of Brentwood)
- St Thomas More High School, Southend-on-Sea (Boys) (Bi-Lateral) (Diocese of Brentwood)

==== Southwark ====
- Notre Dame Roman Catholic Girls' School, London (Girls) (Archdiocese of Southwark)
- Sacred Heart Catholic School, London (Archdiocese of Southwark)
- St Michael's Catholic College, London (Archdiocese of Southwark)
- St Thomas the Apostle College, London (Boys) (Archdiocese of Southwark)

==== St Helens ====
- Carmel College, St Helens, Merseyside (Sixth Form College) (Diocese of Liverpool)
- De La Salle School, St Helens, St Helens, Merseyside (Archdiocese of Liverpool)
- Hope Academy, Newton-le-Willows (Catholic and CE)
- St Augustine of Canterbury Catholic Academy, St Helens, Merseyside (Archdiocese of Liverpool)
- St Cuthbert's Catholic High School, St Helens, Merseyside (Archdiocese of Liverpool)

==== Staffordshire ====
- Blessed Robert Sutton Catholic Voluntary Academy, Burton upon Trent (Diocese of Nottingham)
- Blessed William Howard Catholic School, Stafford (Diocese of Birmingham)
- Cardinal Griffin Catholic College, Cannock (Diocese of Birmingham)
- Painsley Catholic College, Cheadle (Diocese of Birmingham)
- St John Fisher Catholic College, Newcastle-under-Lyme (Diocese of Birmingham)

==== Stockport ====
- Aquinas College, Stockport (Sixth Form College) (Diocese of Shrewsbury)
- Harrytown Catholic High School, Romiley (Diocese of Shrewsbury)
- St Anne's RC Voluntary Academy, Stockport (Diocese of Salford)
- St James' Catholic High School, Stockport, Cheadle Hulme (Diocese of Shrewsbury)

==== Stockton-on-Tees ====
- Our Lady and St Bede Catholic Academy, Stockton-on-Tees (Diocese of Hexham and Newcastle)
- St Michael's Catholic Academy, Billingham (Diocese of Hexham and Newcastle)
- St Patrick's Catholic College, Thornaby-on-Tees (Diocese of Middlesbrough)

==== Stoke-on-Trent ====
- St Joseph's College, Stoke-on-Trent, Stoke-on-Trent (Grammar) (Diocese of Birmingham)
- St Margaret Ward Catholic Academy, Stoke-on-Trent (Diocese of Birmingham)
- St Thomas More Catholic Academy, Stoke-on-Trent (Diocese of Birmingham)

==== Suffolk ====
- St Alban's Catholic High School, Ipswich (Diocese of East Anglia)
- St Benedict's Catholic School, Bury St Edmunds (Diocese of East Anglia)

==== Sunderland ====
- St Aidan's Catholic Academy, Sunderland (Boys) (Diocese of Hexham and Newcastle)
- St Anthony's Girls' Catholic Academy, Sunderland (Girls) (Diocese of Hexham and Newcastle)
- St Robert of Newminster Catholic School, Washington (Diocese of Hexham and Newcastle)

==== Surrey ====
- All Hallows Catholic School, Farnham (Diocese of Portsmouth)
- St Andrew's Catholic School, Leatherhead (Diocese of Arundel and Brighton)
- St Bede's School, Redhill (Catholic and CE)
- St John the Baptist School, Woking (Diocese of Arundel and Brighton)
- St Paul's College, Sunbury-on-Thames (Archdiocese of Westminster)
- St Peter's Catholic School, Guildford (Diocese of Arundel and Brighton)
- Salesian School, Chertsey (Diocese of Arundel and Brighton)

==== Sutton ====
- The John Fisher School, London (Boys) (Archdiocese of Southwark)
- St Philomena's Catholic High School for Girls, London (Girls) (Archdiocese of Southwark)

==== Swindon ====
- St Joseph's Catholic College, Swindon (Diocese of Clifton)

==== Tameside ====
- All Saints Catholic College, Dukinfield (Diocese of Shrewsbury)
- St Damian's Roman Catholic Science College, Ashton-under-Lyne (Diocese of Salford)
- St Thomas More Roman Catholic College, Denton (Diocese of Salford)

==== Telford and Wrekin ====
- Holy Trinity Academy, Telford (Catholic and CE) (Diocese of Shrewsbury)

==== Thurrock ====
- Grays Convent High School, Grays (Girls) (Diocese of Brentwood)

==== Torbay ====
- St Cuthbert Mayne School, Torquay (Catholic and CE)

==== Tower Hamlets ====
- Bishop Challoner Catholic School, London (Archdiocese of Westminster)

==== Trafford ====
- Blessed Thomas Holford Catholic College, Altrincham (Diocese of Shrewsbury)
- Loreto Grammar School, Altrincham (Girls) (Grammar) (Diocese of Shrewsbury)
- St Ambrose College, Hale (Boys) (Grammar) (Diocese of Shrewsbury)
- St Antony's Roman Catholic School, Urmston (Diocese of Salford)

==== Wakefield ====
- St Thomas à Becket Catholic Secondary School, Wakefield (Diocese of Leeds)
- St Wilfrid's Catholic High School, Featherstone (Diocese of Leeds)

==== Walsall ====
- St Francis of Assisi Catholic College, Aldridge (Diocese of Birmingham)
- St Thomas More Catholic School, Willenhall (Diocese of Birmingham)

==== Waltham Forest ====
- Holy Family Catholic School, London (Diocese of Brentwood)

==== Wandsworth ====
- St Francis Xavier College, London (Sixth Form College) (Archdiocese of Southwark)
- St John Bosco College, London (Archdiocese of Southwark)

==== Warrington ====
- Cardinal Newman Catholic High School, Warrington (Diocese of Shrewsbury)
- St Gregory's Catholic High School, Warrington (Archdiocese of Liverpool)

==== Warwickshire ====
- St Benedict's Catholic High School, Alcester (Diocese of Birmingham)
- St Thomas More Catholic School, Nuneaton (Diocese of Birmingham)
- Trinity Catholic School, Leamington Spa (Diocese of Birmingham)

==== West Northamptonshire ====
- Thomas Becket Catholic School, Northampton (Diocese of Northampton)

==== West Sussex ====
- St Oscar Romero Catholic School, Worthing (Diocese of Arundel and Brighton)
- St Paul's Catholic College, Burgess Hill (Diocese of Arundel and Brighton)
- St Philip Howard Catholic High School, Barnham (Diocese of Arundel and Brighton)
- St Wilfrid's Catholic School, Crawley (Diocese of Arundel and Brighton)

==== Westminster ====
- St George's Catholic School, London (Archdiocese of Westminster)

==== Westmorland and Furness ====
- St Bernard's Catholic High School, Barrow-in-Furness (Diocese of Lancaster)

==== Wigan ====
- St Edmund Arrowsmith Catholic High School, Ashton-in-Makerfield (Archdiocese of Liverpool)
- St John Fisher Catholic High School, Wigan (Archdiocese of Liverpool)
- St John Rigby College, Wigan (Sixth Form College) (Archdiocese of Liverpool)
- St Mary's Catholic High School, Astley (Archdiocese of Liverpool)
- St Peter's Catholic High School, Orrell (Archdiocese of Liverpool)

==== Wiltshire ====
- St Augustine's Catholic College, Trowbridge (Diocese of Clifton)
- St Joseph's Catholic School, Laverstock, Salisbury (Diocese of Clifton)

==== Wirral ====
- St Anselm's College, Birkenhead (Boys) (Grammar) (Diocese of Shrewsbury)
- St John Plessington Catholic College, Bebington (Diocese of Shrewsbury)
- St Mary's College, Crosby, Wallasey (Diocese of Shrewsbury)
- Upton Hall School FCJ, Upton (Girls) (Grammar) (Diocese of Shrewsbury)

==== Wolverhampton ====
- Our Lady and St Chad Catholic Academy, Wolverhampton (Diocese of Birmingham)
- St Edmund's Catholic Academy, Wolverhampton (Diocese of Birmingham)

==== Worcestershire ====
- Blessed Edward Oldcorne Catholic College, Worcester (Diocese of Birmingham)
- Hagley Roman Catholic High School, Hagley (Diocese of Birmingham)
- St Augustine's High School, Redditch (13–18 as part of 3 tier structure) (Diocese of Birmingham)

==== York ====
- All Saints Roman Catholic School, York (Diocese of Middlesbrough)

The LEAs of: Bracknell Forest, Bromley, Calderdale, Central Bedfordshire, Cornwall, Devon, Dorset, East Riding of Yorkshire, North East Lincolnshire, North Northamptonshire, North Somerset, Rutland, Shropshire, Somerset, South Gloucestershire, West Berkshire, Windsor and Maidenhead and Wokingham have no Catholic or Joint church Secondary Schools.

Barnsley, Cambridgeshire, Isle of Wight and Torbay only have Joint Catholic and CE Secondary Schools.

=== Wales ===
List of the Catholic Secondary Schools in Wales, alphabetically by Education Authority.

==== Bridgend ====
- Archbishop McGrath Catholic High School, Bridgend (Diocese of Cardiff)

==== Cardiff ====
- Corpus Christi High School, Cardiff, Cardiff (Diocese of Cardiff)
- Mary Immaculate High School, Cardiff (Diocese of Cardiff)
- St David's Sixth Form College, Cardiff, Cardiff (Sixth Form College) (Diocese of Cardiff)
- St Illtyd's High School, Cardiff, Cardiff (Diocese of Cardiff)

==== Carmarthenshire ====
- St John Lloyd Catholic Comprehensive School, Llanelli (Diocese of Cardiff)

==== Denbighshire ====
- Christ the Word Catholic School, Rhyl (Diocese of Wrexham)

==== Flintshire ====
- St Richard Gwyn Catholic High School, Flint (Diocese of Wrexham)

==== Merthyr Tydfil ====
- Blessed Carlo Acutis Catholic School, Merthyr Tydfil (Diocese of Cardiff)

==== Newport ====
- St Joseph's Roman Catholic High School, Newport (Diocese of Cardiff)

==== Rhondda Cynon Taff ====
- Cardinal Newman Roman Catholic School, Pontypridd (Diocese of Cardiff)

==== Swansea ====
- Bishop Vaughan Catholic School, Swansea (Diocese of Cardiff)

==== Torfaen ====
- St Alban's Roman Catholic High School, Pontypool (Diocese of Cardiff)

==== Vale of Glamorgan ====
- St Richard Gwyn Catholic High School, Barry (Diocese of Cardiff)

==== Wrexham ====
- St Joseph's Catholic and Anglican High School, Wrexham (Catholic and CIW) (Diocese of Wrexham)

=== Scotland ===
After the Education Act 1918, many state-funded Scottish Catholic schools were started. Nevertheless, there exist Catholic independent schools such as St Aloysius' College, Glasgow, Fernhill School, Rutherglen, and Kilgraston School. During the Scottish Reformation, while there were no Catholic seminaries in England and Wales, there was a number of Scottish seminaries before the restoration of the Scottish Catholic hierarchy. Notable Scottish Catholic schools today include:

==== Dumfries and Galloway ====
- St Joseph's College, Dumfries (Diocese of Galloway)

==== Dundee ====
- St John's Roman Catholic High School, Dundee
- St Paul's Roman Catholic Academy, Dundee

==== East Ayrshire ====
- Saint Joseph's Academy, Kilmarnock (Diocese of Galloway)

==== East Dunbartonshire ====
- St Ninian's High School, Kirkintilloch
- Turnbull High School, Bishopbriggs

==== East Renfrewshire ====
- St Luke's High School, Barrhead
- St Ninian's High School, Giffnock, Giffnock

==== Edinburgh ====
- Holy Rood High School, Edinburgh
- St Augustine's High School, Edinburgh
- St Thomas of Aquin's High School, Edinburgh

==== Falkirk ====
- St Mungo's High School, Falkirk

==== Fife ====
- St Columba's Roman Catholic High School, Dunfermline
- St Andrew's R.C. High School, Kirkcaldy

==== Glasgow ====
- All Saints Roman Catholic Secondary School, Glasgow
- Holyrood Secondary School, Glasgow
- John Paul Academy, Glasgow
- Lourdes Secondary School, Glasgow
- Notre Dame High School, Glasgow
- St Andrew's Secondary School, Glasgow
- St Margaret Mary's Secondary School, Glasgow
- St Mungo's Academy, Glasgow
- St Paul's High School, Glasgow
- St Roch's Secondary School, Glasgow
- St Thomas Aquinas Secondary School, Glasgow

==== Inverclyde ====
- Notre Dame High School, Greenock
- St Columba's High School, Gourock
- St. Stephen's High School, Port Glasgow

==== Midlothian ====
- St David's Roman Catholic High School, Dalkeith

==== North Ayrshire ====
- St Matthew's Academy, Saltcoats (Diocese of Galloway)

==== North Lanarkshire ====
- Cardinal Newman High School, Bellshill
- Our Lady's High School, Cumbernauld
- Our Lady's High School, Motherwell
- St Aidan's High School, Wishaw
- St Ambrose High School, Coatbridge
- St Andrew's High School, Coatbridge
- St Margaret's High School, Airdrie
- St. Maurice's High School, Cumbernauld
- Taylor High School, New Stevenston

==== Perth and Kinross ====
- St John's Academy, Perth

==== Renfrewshire ====
- St Andrew's Academy, Paisley
- St Benedict's Roman Catholic High School, Linwood
- Trinity High School, Renfrew

==== South Ayrshire ====
- Queen Margaret Academy, Ayr (Diocese of Galloway)

==== South Lanarkshire ====
- Holy Cross High School, Hamilton
- St Andrew's and St Bride's High School, East Kilbride
- Saint John Ogilvie High School, Hamilton
- Trinity High School, Rutherglen

==== Stirling ====
- St Modan's High School, Stirling

==== West Dunbartonshire ====
- Our Lady and St Patrick's High School, Dumbarton
- St Peter the Apostle High School, Clydebank

==== West Lothian ====
- Sinclair Academy, Winchburgh
- St Kentigern's Academy, Blackburn
- St Margaret's Academy, Livingston

== Special Schools ==
- St John's Roman Catholic School, Chigwell (Diocese of Brentwood)
- St John's Catholic School for the Deaf, Boston Spa (Diocese of Leeds)
- Cardinal Winning Secondary School, Glasgow

== Private Schools ==
=== England ===
==== Secondary and All Through ====
- Ampleforth College, Ampleforth (Diocese of Middlesbrough)
- Austin Friars, Carlisle (Diocese of Lancaster)
- Cranmore School, West Horsley (Diocese of Arundel and Brighton)
- Cokethorpe School, Witney (Catholic and Church of England)
- Downside School, Stratton-on-the-Fosse (Diocese of Clifton)
- Farnborough Hill, Farnborough (Girls) (Diocese of Portsmouth)
- The Laurels School, London (Archdiocese of Southwark)
- Leweston School, Longburton (Diocese of Plymouth)
- Marymount International School London, London (Girls) (Archdiocese of Southwark)
- Mayfield School, Mayfield (Girls) (Diocese of Arundel and Brighton)
- More House School, London (Girls) (Archdiocese of Westminster)
- Mount House School, London (Archdiocese of Westminster)
- New Hall School, Chelmsford (Diocese of Brentwood)
- Notre Dame School, Cobham (Diocese of Arundel and Brighton)
- Oakhill School, Whalley (Diocese of Lancaster)
- Our Lady of Sion School, Worthing (Diocese of Arundel and Brighton)
- Princethorpe College, Princethorpe (Diocese of Birmingham)
- Prior Park College, Bath (Diocese of Clifton)
- Ratcliffe College, Ratcliffe on the Wreake (Diocese of Nottingham)
- Salesian College, Farnborough, Farnborough (Diocese of Portsmouth)
- St Augustine's Priory, London (Diocese of Westminster)
- St Bede's College, Manchester (Diocese of Salford)
- St Benedict's School, London (Archdiocese of Westminster)
- St Catherine's School, London (Archdiocese of Westminster)
- St Columba's College, St Albans (Archdiocese of Westminster)
- St Dominic's Grammar School, Brewood (Diocese of Birmingham)
- St Dominic's Priory School, Stone (Diocese of Birmingham)
- St Dominic's School, Hambledon (Archdiocese of Arundel and Brighton)
- St Edmund's College, Puckeridge (Archdiocese of Westminster)
- St Edward's School, Cheltenham (Diocese of Clifton)
- St George's College, Weybridge (Diocese of Arundel and Brighton)
- St Joseph's College, Ipswich (Diocese of East Anglia)
- St Joseph's College, Reading (Diocese of Portsmouth)
- St Mary's School, Cambridge (Girls) (Diocese of East Anglia)
- St Mary's School Ascot, Ascot (Girls) (Diocese of Portsmouth)
- St Michael's School (Diocese of Portsmouth)
- St Teresa's School Effingham, Effingham (Diocese of Arundel and Brighton)
- Stonyhurst College, Clitheroe (Diocese of Lancaster)
- The Marist School, Sunninghill (Diocese of Portsmouth)
- The Oratory School, Woodcote (Diocese of Birmingham)
- Thornton College, Thornton (Girls) (Diocese of Northampton)
- Woldingham School, Woldingham (Diocese of Arundel and Brighton)
- Worth School, Crawley (Diocese of Arundel and Brighton)

=== Wales ===
- St John's College, Cardiff (Diocese of Cardiff)

=== Scotland ===
- Fernhill School, Rutherglen
- Kilgraston School, Bridge of Earn
- St Aloysius' College, Glasgow

== See also ==
- Catholic Church in England and Wales
- Catholic Church in Scotland
- Catholic Church in Northern Ireland
- Selective Catholic schools
- List of Catholic churches in the United Kingdom
