= Ellesmere Port Catholic High School =

Ellesmere Port Catholic High School, A Voluntary Academy

Location
- Capenhurst Lane; Ellesmere Port, Cheshire, CH65 7AQ; England
- Coordinates: 53.27085°N 2.91418°W

Information
- Type: Academy
- Religious affiliation: Roman Catholic
- Local authority: Cheshire West and Chester
- Trust: The Holy Family of Nazareth Catholic Academy Trust
- Department for Education URN: 149631 Tables
- Ofsted: Reports
- Headteacher: Lorraine Henderson, Acting Headteacher
- Gender: Coeducational
- Age: 11 to 18
- Enrolment: 922 as of December 2022
- Website: http://www.epchs.co.uk/

Ellesmere Port Catholic High School is a coeducational secondary school and sixth form located in the Whitby area of Ellesmere Port in the English county of Cheshire.

Previously a voluntary aided school administered by Cheshire West and Chester Council, in April 2023 Ellesmere Port Catholic High School converted to academy status. The school is now sponsored by The Holy Family of Nazareth Catholic Academy Trust but continues to be under the jurisdiction of the Roman Catholic Diocese of Shrewsbury.

Ellesmere Port Catholic High School offers GCSEs and BTECs as programmes of study for pupils, while students in the sixth form have the option to study from a range of A-levels.
