= The Academy of St Francis of Assisi =

Location
- Gardners Drive; Fairfield; Liverpool, Merseyside, L6 7UR; England
- Coordinates: 53.41713°N 2.94437°W

Information
- Type: Academy
- Religious affiliation: Roman Catholic/Church of England
- Department for Education URN: 144493 Tables
- Ofsted: Reports
- Gender: Coeducational
- Age: 11 to 16
- Website: www.asfaonline.org

Academy of St Francis of Assisi, commonly abbreviated as ASFA or SFA, and known amongst its pupils as "St Francis" or "Assisi" is a coeducational joint-faith Roman Catholic and Church of England secondary school with academy status. The school is located in the Fairfield area of Liverpool, England, and is named after Saint Francis of Assisi.

== Description ==
The school first opened in 2005.

The Academy of St Francis of Assisi was built on the site of a waste dump at a cost of £20 million. The buildings are constructed to environmentally sustainable standards, with features including a solar atrium, a rainwater re-harvesting facility and a roof garden. The school is jointly sponsored by the Roman Catholic Archdiocese of Liverpool and the Anglican Diocese of Liverpool.

The Academy of St Francis of Assisi offers GCSEs and BTECs as programmes of study for pupils, while students in the sixth form have the option to study from a range of A-levels and further BTECs. The school has a specialism in sustainable development and the environment.

In February 2017, the Academy officially partnered with The Academy of St Nicholas, formerly Enterprise South Liverpool Academy, or ESLA, to form the All Saints Multi Academy Trust. As the St Francis Sixth Form itself was closed down, school leavers from the class of 2017, as well as Assisi sixth formers, merged with St Nicholas to join the newly opened All Saints Sixth Form College.
