= Selective Catholic schools =

Type of school in England

Selective Catholic schools were Roman Catholic secondary schools that existed in England until the beginning of the twenty-first century. They emerged from successive governments' desire to create a free market in the state education system. These schools were able, primarily through selecting by interviewing prospect pupils along with their parents, to attract pupils from motivated families who were committed to the education and advancement of their children and to the schools themselves.

The London Oratory School in Fulham was one of the last to select its intake, until 2006 interviewing pupil candidates and their parents; afterwards it continued to select a small portion of its intake based on musical aptitude. The John Fisher School in leafy Purley, Surrey, was interviewing prospect boys and their parents as recently as 2008.

In 1999, the government banned pupil selection by interview and many of the ancillary processes these schools used to determine their intake. Some selective Roman Catholic schools introduced a points admission system that effectively permitted them to select pupils, typically with candidates who are from "fully practising Catholic families" given priority, followed by other Roman Catholics, then non-Catholics.

Interviews, quizzing parents about their occupations, and obtaining previous school reports have been outlawed by the Schools' Admissions Code.
