= St Alban's Catholic High School, Ipswich =

St Alban's Catholic High School

Location
- Digby Road; Ipswich, Suffolk, IP4 3NJ; England; 52.06327°N 1.19994°E

Information
- Type: Academy
- Motto: Learning, Respecting, Caring
- Religious affiliation: Roman Catholic
- Established: 1966
- Local authority: Suffolk
- Department for Education URN: 137849 Tables
- Ofsted: Reports
- Head teacher: Simon Corless
- Gender: Coeducational
- Age: 11 to 18
- Colour: Green (Year 7 - 11)
- Website: http://www.st-albans.suffolk.sch.uk

St Alban's Catholic High School is a secondary school and sixth form with academy status located in Ipswich, Suffolk, England.
