= Sacred Heart Primary School, Teddington =

Sacred Heart Primary School

Location
- St Marks Road; Middlesex, TW11 9DD; England; 51.4204°N 0.3215°W

Information
- Type: Voluntary aided school
- Religious affiliation: Roman Catholic
- Established: 1885
- School district: Teddington
- Local authority: London Borough of Richmond upon Thames
- Department for Education URN: 102916 Tables
- Ofsted: Reports
- Head teacher: Bernadette Smith
- Gender: mixed
- Age: 3 to 11
- Enrolment: 231 as of 2014
- Capacity: 210
- Website: www.sacredheart.richmond.sch.uk

Sacred Heart Primary School is a Roman Catholic primary school in Teddington in the London Borough of Richmond upon Thames.

== History ==
The school was established in 1885 in nearby Fairfax Road and managed almost from its inception by a small convent of three or four Sisters of Charity of St. Paul, who also ran their own convent school at 253 Kingston Road. The school premises, Chantry House,(51.4193°N 0.3184°W) were initially divided, with the school on the ground floor and chapel on the first floor. With the construction and opening of Sacred Heart Church in 1893, the school expanded upstairs.

The parish school moved from Chantry House to its present location in St. Marks Road in 1963. The premises were constructed in 1927 and were previously St Mark's School primary school until 1929 when it evolved into a Church of England secondary school. The top class of Chantry House were sent to St Mark's. During World War II, pupils were evacuated to Wales and the site used as a first-aid post and ambulance station. Chantry House was damaged by a V-2 rocket in 1944, but the school re-opened at the end of the war. In 1963 St Mark's School moved to form Teddington School and the Diocese of Westminster purchased both Chantry House and the St Mark's Road site.
