= Holy Cross Catholic High School, Chorley =

Holy Cross Catholic High School

Location
- Myles Standish Way; Chorley, Lancashire, PR7 3LS; England
- Coordinates: 53.6364°N 2.6301°W

Information
- Type: Voluntary aided school
- Religious affiliation: Roman Catholic
- Local authority: Lancashire
- Department for Education URN: 119803 Tables
- Ofsted: Reports
- Head teacher: Greg Lindley
- Gender: Coeducational
- Age: 11 to 16
- Website: http://www.holycross.lancs.sch.uk/

Holy Cross Catholic High School is a Roman Catholic Voluntary aided comprehensive school in Chorley, Lancashire, England.

The school provides co-educational education for approximately 830 pupils in the 11–16 age range, most of whom reside in Chorley itself, or the surrounding villages of Chorley Borough, part of the Roman Catholic Archdiocese of Liverpool.

The headteacher, Mr. Ivan Gaughan, joined the school in April 2014, after nine years as Deputy Headteacher at Blessed Trinity RC College, Burnley.

== History ==
The school started as separate boys and girls only schools. St Augustines was the boys school, while St Hildas was an all-girls school. Until 1999 the school still operated in the remnants of the two separate school buildings joined by a pathway.

The Chorley East Link Road (B5252) was opened to the public during the afternoon of 22 November 2007, and the spur up to the school was opened for use on 23 November 2007, the following morning.

== Inspections ==
The school was judged "outstanding" by Ofsted in October 2017, and "outstanding" by the Archdiocese of Liverpool in March 2019.

== Academics ==
The school received a grant of £132,921,000 from the Big Lottery Fund in July 2006 as part of an initiative by the Fund to boost school sports programmes. This grant was for a programme of eight activities, including one aimed at increasing girls' interest in sport, by introducing aerobics, dance and cheer-leading.

== Extracurricular activities ==
The school offers a wide range of enhancement activities, both during and beyond the school day, covering sports, the arts, and including the Duke of Edinburgh's Award, Young Enterprise.
