= Saints Peter and Paul Catholic High School =

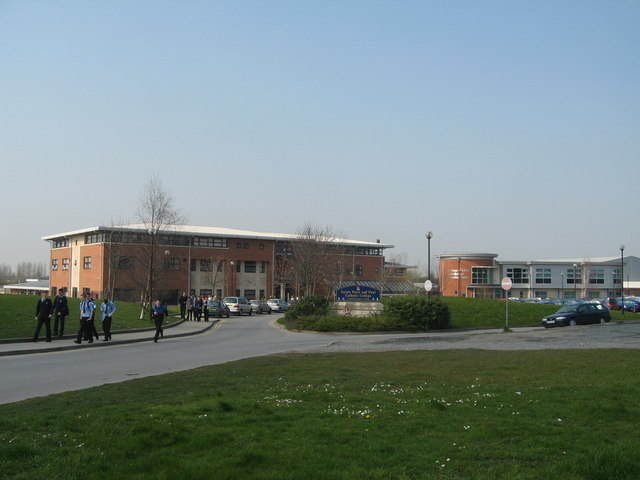
- View of the school (2007)

Location
- Highfield Road; Widnes, Cheshire, WA8 7DW; England; 53.3738°N 2.7403°W

Information
- Type: Voluntary aided school
- Religious affiliation: Roman Catholic
- Established: 1952
- Local authority: Halton Borough Council
- Department for Education URN: 111457 Tables
- Ofsted: Reports
- Head teacher: Louise McComas
- Gender: Coeducational
- Age: 11 to 16
- Enrolment: 1282 as of January 2024
- Capacity: 1677
- Website: saintspeterandpaul.halton.sch.uk

Saints Peter and Paul Catholic High School is a coeducational Roman Catholic secondary school in Widnes, Cheshire.

It is a voluntary aided school administered by the Roman Catholic Archdiocese of Liverpool and Halton Borough Council.

== History ==
The school opened in 1952 as Saints Joseph's Roman Catholic High School. It was initially a mixed sex secondary modern school but from 1959 education was provided separately for boys and girls. It returned to being a mixed sex school in 1972. It later merged with the neighbouring Sts John Fisher and Thomas More Roman Catholic High School to form Saints Peter and Paul Roman Catholic High School. Its current name is Saints Peter and Paul Catholic High School.
