= Christ the King Catholic High School, Preston =

Voluntary aided school in Lancashire, England

Christ the King Catholic High School

Location
- Lawrence Avenue; Frenchwood; Preston, Lancashire, PR1 4PR; England; 53.75156°N 2.68772°W

Information
- Type: Voluntary aided school
- Religious affiliation: Roman Catholic
- Local authority: Lancashire
- Department for Education URN: 119781 Tables
- Ofsted: Reports
- Headteacher: Mrs C. Jones
- Gender: Coeducational
- Age: 11 to 16
- Enrolment: 402 as of December 2024
- Houses: Assisi, Goretti, Kolbe, Romero
- Website: http://ctk.lancs.sch.uk/

Christ the King Catholic High School is a coeducational secondary school located in Preston in the English county of Lancashire.

It was a voluntary aided school administered by Lancashire County Council and the Roman Catholic Diocese of Lancaster. However, following an Ofsted report in September 2022 in which the school's leadership and management were rated inadequate and all other areas rated requires improvement, the school officially shut on 31st December 2023 and re-opened the following day as an academy converter under the Mater Ecclesiae Catholic Multi-Academy Trust.

The school offers GCSEs and Cambridge Nationals as programmes of study for pupils, and also offers the Duke of Edinburgh's Award programme. The school also has a specialism in maths and computing.
