= Bishop Challoner Catholic Secondary School =

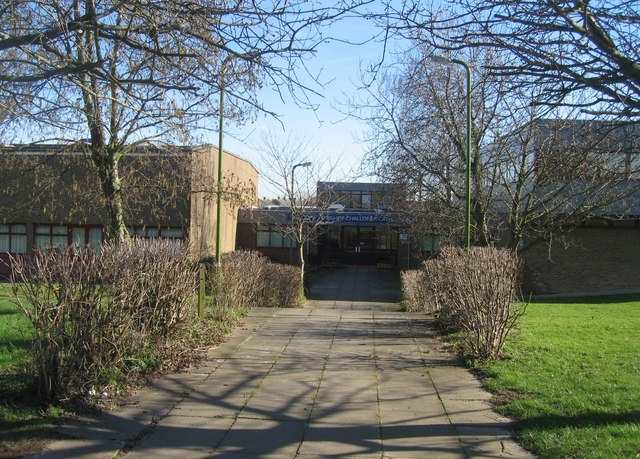

Location
- St. Michael's Road; Basingstoke, Hampshire; England; 51.256706°N 1.123073°W

Information
- Type: Voluntary aided school
- Motto: Do ordinary things extra ordinarily well
- Religious affiliation: Roman Catholic
- Established: September 1973
- Department for Education URN: 116478 Tables
- Ofsted: Reports
- Head teacher: John Wright
- Gender: Coeducational
- Age: 11 to 16
- Enrolment: Around 900
- Website: https://www.bcs.hants.sch.uk/

Bishop Challoner Catholic Secondary School is a coeducational Roman Catholic secondary school located in Basingstoke, Hampshire, England, founded in 1975.

Students come mainly from three Catholic primary schools: St Annes, (Basingstoke), St Bedes (Basingstoke) and St John the Baptist (Andover) though other students are enrolled as well.

In recent years the school has begun redevelopment of many of the facilities including the construction of a new library and a radio station. They have also now constructed a new sports hall, as well as a new building, the Pope Francis Wing.

== Religious emphasis ==
Each house/tutor has their own classroom/Tutor room which, in the morning registration is held for each tutor.

Unlike many nearby schools, Bishop Challoner has religious education as a core GCSE subject.
