= Cardinal Winning Secondary School =

Coordinates: 55.8403°N 4.1682°W

Location
- 30 Fullarton Avenue, Tollcross; Glasgow, G32 8NJ; Scotland

Information
- Motto: Caritas Christi Urget Nos (The love of Christ compels us)
- Religious affiliation: Catholic
- Established: 2011
- Local authority: Glasgow
- Specialist: Additional Learning Needs
- Head teacher: Marie Louise Macdonald
- Staff: 31 teaching
- Gender: Mixed
- Age: 11 to 18
- Enrolment: 125
- Website: Official website

Cardinal Winning Secondary School is a Roman Catholic co-educational secondary school, located in the Tollcross area of Glasgow.

It caters for secondary aged children with Additional Learning Needs. It has an autism spectrum department.

It opened in June 2011 following the closures of St Aidan's School and St Joan of Arc School. It is named after Cardinal Winning, the first Roman Catholic Cardinal of Glasgow, who died in 2001.

The school offers a range of subjects including Art, Computing, English, Enterprise and Employability, Home Economics, Maths, Music, PE, Religion, Science, Technical and Life Skills Learning. It also offers opportunities to participate in several recreational activities including badminton, lego, singing, chess and art.
