= St Thomas à Becket Catholic Secondary School =

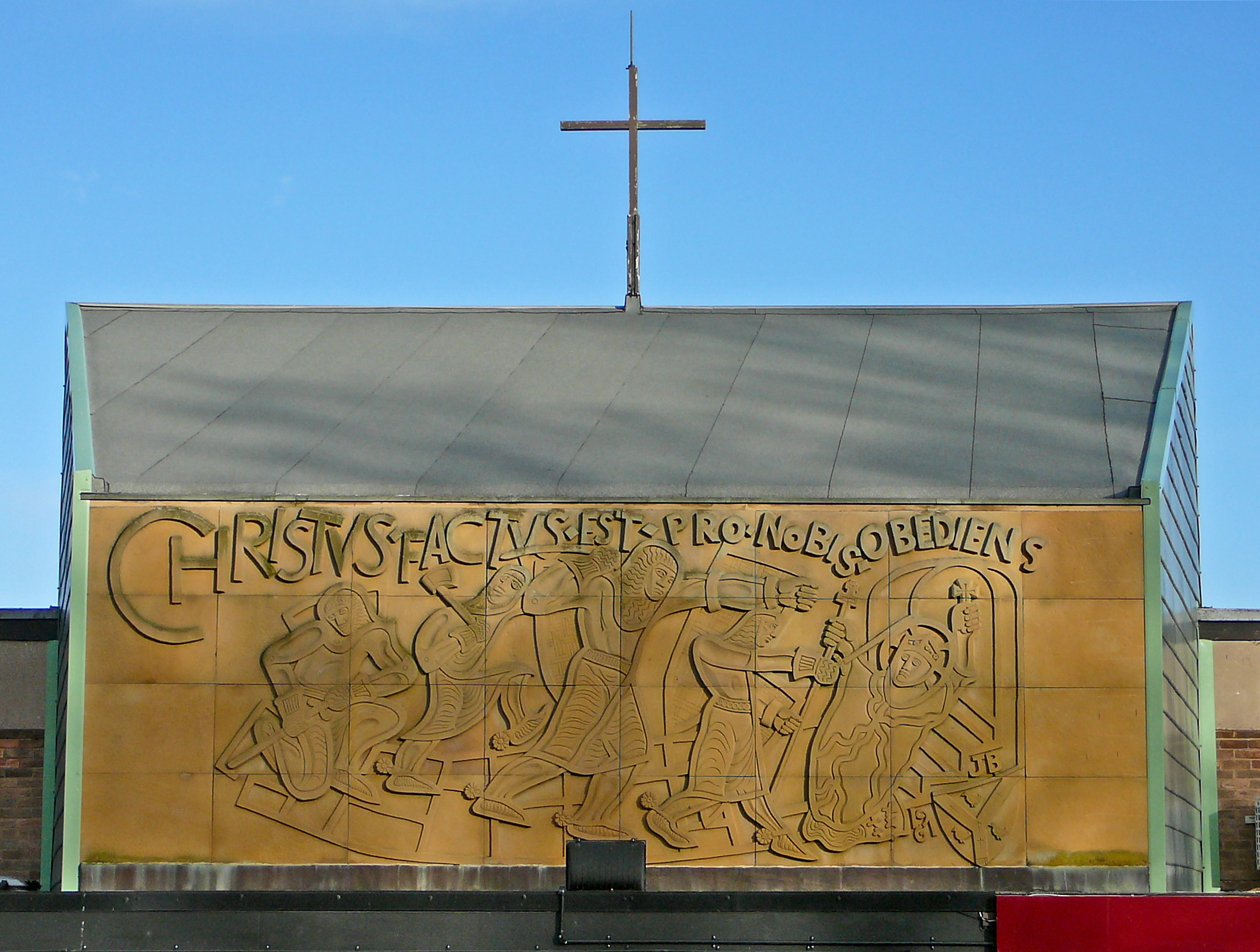

Location
- Barnsley Road; Sandal; Wakefield, West Yorkshire, WF2 6EQ; England
- Coordinates: 53.66099°N 1.48288°W

Information
- Type: Academy
- Motto: Esse Quam Videri meaning 'To be, rather than to seem to be.'
- Religious affiliation: Roman Catholic
- Established: 1962
- Department for Education URN: 138950 Tables
- Ofsted: Reports
- Head teacher: Patrick Caldwell
- Gender: Coeducational
- Age: 11 to 16
- Houses: Bretton, Clitherow, Fisher, Lambton and Middleton
- Website: https://www.st-thomasabecket.bkcat.co.uk

St Thomas à Becket Catholic Secondary School is a coeducational secondary school with academy status in Wakefield, West Yorkshire, England. It has 749 pupils enrolled.

The current Headteacher is Dr Patrick Caldwell who succeeded from Catherine Baxendale beginning September 2022, who succeeded John J. Rooney, who succeeded Brian S. L. Donnellan at Christmas 2009.

== Motto ==
The school's motto is "Esse Quam Videri", meaning "To be, rather than seem to be". This is also the title of the school hymn.

== Specialist status ==
The school has a specialist status in humanities and used the money provided to improve technology in lessons.
