= Holy Trinity Catholic School, Birmingham =

Coordinates: 52.4674°N 1.8641°W

Holy Trinity Catholic School

Location
- Oakley Road; Small Heath; Birmingham, West Midlands, B10 0AX; England

Information
- Type: Academy
- Religious affiliation: Roman Catholic
- Local authority: Birmingham City Council
- Trust: St Teresa of Calcutta Multi-Academy Company
- Department for Education URN: 144719 Tables
- Ofsted: Reports
- Head of School: Jo Daw
- Gender: Coeducational
- Age: 11 to 16
- Enrolment: 671 as of December 2022
- Website: http://holytrc.com/

Holy Trinity Catholic School is a coeducational secondary school located in the Small Heath area of Birmingham, in the West Midlands of England.

The school is named after the Trinity, the Christian doctrine that defines God as the Father, the Son, and the Holy Spirit. As a Catholic school it is under the jurisdiction of Roman Catholic Archdiocese of Birmingham.

Previously a voluntary aided school administered by Birmingham City Council, in May 2019 Holy Trinity Catholic School converted to academy status. The school is now sponsored by the St Teresa of Calcutta Multi-Academy Company.

Holy Trinity Catholic School offers GCSEs and BTECs as programmes of study for pupils.
