= List of schools in Lancashire =

This is a list of schools in Lancashire, England.

== State-funded schools ==
=== Primary schools ===
- Abbey Village Primary School, Abbey Village
- Adlington Primary School, Adlington
- Al-Ikhlaas Primary School, Nelson
- All Saints CE Primary School, Chorley
- All Saints CE Primary School, Clayton-le-Moors
- Alston Lane RC Primary School, Longridge
- Altham St James CE Primary School, Altham
- Anderton Primary School, Adlington
- Ansdell Primary School, Ansdell
- Appley Bridge All Saints CE Primary School, Appley Bridge
- Arkholme CE Primary School, Arkholme
- Ashton Primary School, Preston
- Asmall Primary School, Ormskirk
- Bacup Holy Trinity Stacksteads CE Primary School, Bacup
- Bacup St Saviour's Community Primary School, Bacup
- Bacup Thorn Primary School, Bacup
- Baines Endowed VC Primary School, Thornton-Cleveleys
- Balderstone St Leonard's CE VA Primary School, Balderstone
- Balshaw Lane Community Primary School, Euxton
- Bamber Bridge St Aidan's CE Primary School, Bamber Bridge
- Banks Methodist Primary School, Banks
- Banks St Stephen's CE Primary School, Banks
- Barden Infant and Junior School, Burnley
- Barnacre Road Primary School, Longridge
- Barnoldswick CE Primary School, Barnoldswick
- Barrow Primary School, Clitheroe
- Barrowford St Thomas CE Primary School, Barrowford
- Barrowford School, Barrowford
- Barton St Lawrence CE Primary School, Barton
- Baxenden St John CE Primary School, Baxenden
- Benjamin Hargreaves CE Primary School, Accrington
- Bickerstaffe Voluntary Controlled CE School, Bickerstaffe
- Bilsborrow John Cross CE Primary School, Bilsborrow
- Bishop Martin CE Primary School, Skelmersdale
- Blacko Primary School, Blacko
- The Blessed Sacrament RC Primary School, Preston
- Bolton by Bowland CE VA Primary School, Bolton-by-Bowland
- Bolton Le Sands CE Primary School, Bolton-le-Sands
- Bowerham Community Primary School, Lancaster
- Brabins Endowed School, Chipping
- Bradley Primary School, Nelson
- The Breck Primary School, Poulton-le-Fylde
- Bretherton Endowed CE VA Primary School, Bretherton
- Briercliffe Primary School, Briercliffe
- Brindle Gregson Lane Primary School, Hoghton
- Britannia Community Primary School, Bacup
- Broad Oak Primary School, Penwortham
- Brockholes Wood Community Primary School, Preston
- Brookfield Community Primary School, Preston
- Brookfield Park Primary School, Skelmersdale
- Brookside Primary School, Clitheroe
- Broughton-in-Amounderness CE Primary School
- Brunshaw Primary School, Burnley
- Bryning with Warton St Paul's CE Primary School, Bryning-with-Warton
- Buckshaw Primary School, Astley Village
- Burscough Bridge Methodist School, Burscough
- Burscough Lordsgate Township CE Primary School, Burscoug
- Burscough Village Primary School, Burscough
- Calder Vale St John's CE Primary School, Calder Vale
- Carleton Green Community Primary School, Carleton
- Carleton St Hilda's CE Primary School, Carleton
- Carnforth Primary School, Carnforth
- Carr Head Primary School, Poulton-le-Fylde
- Castercliff Primary School, Nelson
- Casterton Primary School, Burnley
- Castle View Primary Academy, Lancaster
- Catforth Primary School, Catforth
- The Cathedral RC Primary School, Lancaster
- Caton Community Primary School, Caton
- Caton St Paul's CE Primary School, Caton
- Cawthorne's Endowed Primary School, Abbeystead
- Charles Saer Primary School, Fleetwood
- Chaucer Community Primary School, Fleetwood
- Chatburn CE Primary School, Chatburn
- Cherry Fold Community Primary School, Burnley
- Christ Church CE Primary School, Aughton
- Christ Church CE Primary School, Carnforth
- Christ Church CE Primary School, Charnock Richard
- Christ Church CE Primary School, Colne
- Christ Church CE Primary School, Lancaster
- Christ The King RC Primary School, Burnley
- Claughton on Brock St Mary's RC Primary School, Claughton
- Clayton Brook Primary School, Clayton-le-Woods
- Clayton-le-Woods CE Primary School, Clayton-le-Woods
- Clifton Primary School, Ansdell
- Coates Lane Primary School, Barnoldswick
- Cobbs Brow Primary School, Skelmersdale
- Cockerham Parochial CE Primary School, Cockerham
- Cop Lane CE Primary School, Penwortham
- Coppull Parish CE Primary School, Coppull
- Coppull Primary School, Coppull
- Cottam Primary School, Cottam
- Coupe Green Primary School, Coupe Green
- Crawford Village Primary School, Crawford Village
- Crawshawbooth Primary School, Crawshawbooth
- Crow Orchard Primary School, Skelmersdale
- Cuerden Church School, Bamber Bridge
- Dallas Road Primary School, Lancaster
- Dalton St Michael's CE Primary School, Dalton
- Delph Side Community Primary School, Skelmersdale
- Deepdale Primary School, Preston
- Dolphinholme CE Primary School, Dolphinholme
- Downholland-Haskayne VA CE Primary School, Haskayne
- Duke Street Primary School, Chorley
- Earby Springfield Primary School, Earby
- Eccleston Primary School, Eccleston
- Edenfield CE Primary School, Edenfield
- Edisford Primary School, Clitheroe
- Eldon Primary School, Preston
- Ellel St John the Evangelist CE Primary School, Ellel
- English Martyrs RC Primary School, Preston
- Euxton CE VA Primary School, Euxton
- Farington Primary School, Farington
- Farington Moss St Paul's CE Primary School, Farington
- Fishwick Primary School, Preston
- Forton Primary School, Forton
- Foulridge St Michael and All Angels CE Primary School, Foulridge
- Flakefleet Primary School, Fleetwood
- Freckleton CE Primary School, Freckleton
- Frenchwood Community Primary School, Preston
- Fulwood and Cadley Primary School, Fulwood, Preston
- Garstang Community Primary School, Garstang
- Garstang St Thomas CE Primary School, Garstang
- Garstang SS Mary and Michael RC Primary School, Garstang
- Gillibrand Primary School, Chorley
- Gisburn Primary School, Gisburn
- Gisburn Road Primary School, Barnoldswick
- Goosnargh Oliverson's CE Primary School, Goosnargh
- Goosnargh Whitechapel Primary School, Goosnargh
- Grange Primary School, Preston
- Great Eccleston Copp CE Primary School, Great Eccleston
- Great Harwood Primary School, Great Harwood
- Great Marsden St John's CE Primary School, Nelson
- Great Wood Primary School, Morecambe
- Green Haworth CE Primary School, Green Haworth
- Greenlands Community Primary School, Preston
- Grimsargh St Michael's CE Primary School, Grimsargh
- Grindleton CE VA Primary School, Grindleton
- Grosvenor Park Primary School, Morecambe
- Halsall St Cuthbert's CE Primary School, Halsall
- Hambleton Primary Academy, Hambleton
- Hapton CE/Methodist Primary School, Hapton
- Harris Primary School, Fulwood
- Haslingden Primary School, Haslingden
- Haslingden Broadway Primary School, Haslingden
- Haslingden St James CE Primary School, Haslingden
- Heasandford Primary School, Burnley
- Helmshore Primary School, Helmshore
- Hesketh-with-Becconsall All Saints CE School, Hesketh Bank
- Heyhouses Endowed CE primary school, Lytham St Annes
- Heysham St Peter's CE primary School, Heysham
- Higher Walton CE Primary School, Walton-le-Dale
- Highfield Primary School, Chorley
- Higham St John's CE Primary School, Higham
- Hillside Community Primary School, Skelmersdale
- Hippings Methodist VC Primary School, Oswaldtwistle
- Holland Moor Primary School, Skelmersdale
- Holme Slack Community Primary School, Preston
- Holmeswood Methodist School, Holmeswood
- Holy Family RC Primary School, Preston
- Holy Family RC Primary School, Warton
- Holy Saviour RC Primary School, Nelson
- Holy Trinity RC Primary School, Brierfield
- Holy Trinity CE Primary School, Burnley
- Hoole St Michael C of E Primary School, Much Hoole
- Hornby St Margaret's CE Primary School, Hornby
- Howick Church Endowed Primary School, Penwortham
- Huncoat Primary School, Huncoat
- Hyndburn Park Primary School, Accrington
- Ightenhill Primary School, Burnley
- Ingol Community Primary School, Preston
- Inskip St Peter's CE School, Inskip
- Kelbrook Primary School, Kelbrook
- Kennington Primary School, Fulwood
- Kingsfold Primary School, Penwortham
- Kirkham St Michael's CE Primary School, Kirkham
- Kirkham and Wesham Primary School, Kirkham
- Kirkham The Willows RC Primary School, Kirkham
- Kirkland and Catterall St Helen's CE Primary School, Churchtown
- Knuzden St Oswald's CE Primary School, Knuzden
- Lancaster Lane Community Primary School, Clayton-le-Woods
- Lancaster Road Primary School, Morecambe
- Laneshaw Bridge Primary School, Laneshaw Bridge
- Langho and Billington St Leonards CE Primary School, Langho
- Larkholme Primary School, Fleetwood
- Lathom Park CE Primary School, Lathom
- Lea Community Primary School
- Lea Neeld's Endowed CE Primary School
- Lea St Mary's RC Primary School
- Leck St Peter's CE Primary School, Leck
- Lever House Primary School, Farington
- Leyland Methodist Infant School, Leyland
- Leyland Methodist Junior School, Leyland
- Little Digmoor Primary School, Skelmersdale
- Little Hoole Primary School, Walmer Bridge
- Lomeshaye Junior School, Nelson
- Longridge CE Primary School, Longridge
- Longridge St Wilfrid's RC Primary School, Longridge
- Longsands Community Primary School, Fulwood
- Longton Primary School, Longton
- Lord Street School, Colne
- Lostock Hall Community Primary School, Lostock Hall
- Lowerhouse Junior School, Burnley
- Lytham CE Primary School, Lytham St Annes
- Lytham Hall Park Primary School, Lytham St Annes
- Maharishi School, Lathom
- Manor Beach Primary School, Thornton-Cleveleys
- Manor Road Primary School, Clayton-le-Woods
- Marsden Community Primary School, Nelson
- Mayfield Primary School, Lytham St Annes
- Medlar-with-Wesham CE Primary School, Medlar-with-Wesham
- Melling St Wilfred's CE Primary School, Melling
- Mellor St Mary CE Primary School, Mellor
- Mere Brow CE Primary School, Mere Brow
- Middleforth CE Primary School, Penwortham
- Moss Side Primary School, Leyland
- Moor End Primary School, Oswaldtwistle
- Moor Nook Community Primary School, Preston
- Moorside Community Primary School, Skelmersdale
- Moorside Primary School, Lancaster
- Morecambe Bay Community Primary School, Morecambe
- Mossgate Primary School, Heysham
- Mount Pleasant Primary School, Clayton-le-Moors
- Nateby Primary School, Nateby
- Nether Kellet Community Primary School, Nether Kellet
- New Longton All Saints CE Primary School, New Longton
- Newburgh CE Primary School, Newburgh
- Newchurch-in-Pendle St Mary's CE Primary School, Newchurch in Pendle
- Newton Bluecoat CE Primary School, Newton-with-Scales
- Carnforth Primary School, Carnforth
- Northbrook Primary School, Leyland
- Northern Primary School, Bacup
- Northhold Community Primary School, Thornton-Cleveleys
- The Olive School, Preston
- Ormskirk CE Primary School, Ormskirk
- Our Lady and St Anselm's RC Primary School, Whitworth
- Our Lady and St Edward's RC Primary School, Fulwood
- Our Lady and St Gerard's RC Primary School, Lostock Hall
- Our Lady and St Huthbert's RC Primary School, Great Harwood
- Our Lady of Lourdes RC Primary School, Carnforth
- Our Lady Star of the Sea RC Primary School, Lytham St Annes
- Over Kellet Wilson's Endowed CE Primary School, Over Kellet
- Overton St Helen's CE Primary School, Overton
- Padiham Green CE Primary School, Padiham
- Padiham Primary School, Padiham
- Parbold Douglas CE Primary School, Parbold
- Parbold Our Lady and All Saints RC Primary School, Parbold
- Park Primary School, Colne
- Peel Park Primary School, Accrington
- Pemberton's CE Primary School, Heskin
- Pendle Primary Academy, Brierfield
- Pendle Primary School, Clitheroe
- Penwortham Primary School, Penwortham
- Pilling St John's CE Primary School, Pilling
- Pilling St William's RC Primary School, Pilling
- Pinfold Primary School, Scarisbrick
- Pool House Community Primary School, Preston
- Poulton Le Sands CE Primary School, Morecambe
- Preesall Carter's Charity VC Primary School, Preesall
- Preesall Fleetwood's Charity School, Preesall
- Primet Primary School, Colne
- Primrose Hill Primary School, Euxton
- Queen Drive Primary School, Fulwood
- Quernmore CE Primary School, Quernmore
- Rawtenstall Balladen Community Primary School, Rawtenstall
- Rawtenstall Newchurch CE Primary School, Rawtenstall
- Rawtenstall St Anne's CE Primary School, Rawtenstall
- Rawtenstall St Paul's Constable Lee CE Primary School, Rawtenstall
- Rawtenstall Water Primary School, Rawtenstall
- Read St John's CE Primary School, Read
- Reedley Primary School, Reedley Hallows
- Ribbleton Avenue Methodist Infant School, Preston
- Ribbleton Avenue Methodist Junior School, Preston
- Ribby with Wrea Endowed CE Primary School, Wrea Green
- Ribchester St Wilfrid's CE Primary School, Ribchester
- Richard Durning's Endowed Primary School, Bispham Green
- Rishton Methodist Primary School, Rishton
- Rivington Primary School, Rivington
- The Roebuck School, Preston
- Rosegrove Infant School, Burnley
- Rosewood Primary School, Burnley
- Roughlee CE Primary School, Roughlee
- Royles Brook Primary School, Thornton-Cleveleys
- Rufford CE School, Rufford
- Ryelands Primary School, Lancaster
- Sabden Primary School, Sabden
- Sacred Heart RC Primary School, Chorley
- Sacred Heart RC Primary School, Church
- Sacred Heart RC Primary School, Colne
- Sacred Heart RC Primary School, Preston
- Sacred Heart RC Primary School, Thornton-Cleveleys
- St Andrew's CE Infant School, Leyland
- St Andrew's CE Primary School, Oswaldtwistle
- St Andrew's CE Primary School, Preston
- St Anne's and St Joseph's RC Primary School, Accrington
- St Anne's RC Primary School, Leyland
- St Anne's RC Primary School, Ormskirk
- St Anthony's RC Primary School, Fulwood
- St Augustine of Canterbury RC Primary School, Burnley
- St Augustine's RC Primary School, Preston
- St Bartholomew's CE Primary School, Whitworth
- St Bartholomew's Parish CE Primary School, Great Harwood
- St Bede's RC Primary School, Clayton Green
- St Bernadette's RC Primary School, Lancaster
- St Bernard's RC Primary School, Lea
- St Catherine's RC Primary School, Leyland
- St Chad's CE Primary School, Poulton-le-Fylde
- St Chad's RC Primary School, Whittle-le-Woods
- St Charles RC School, Rishton
- St Clare's RC Primary School, Preston
- St Edmund's RC Primary School, Skelmersdale
- St Francis of Assisi RC Primary School, Skelmersdale
- St Francis RC Primary School, Goosnargh
- St George's CE Primary School, Chorley
- St Gregory's RC Primary School, Chorley
- St Gregory's RC Primary School, Preston
- St Ignatius RC Primary School, Preston
- St James CE Primary School, Clitheroe
- St James CE Primary School, Leyland
- St James CE Primary School, Westhead
- St James RC Primary School, Skelmersdale
- St James' CE Primary School, Chorley
- St James' CE Primary School, Brindle
- St James' Lanehead CE Primary School, Burnley
- St James-the-less RC Primary School, Rawtenstall
- St John Southworth RC Primary School, Nelson
- St John the Baptist RC Primary School, Burnley
- St John the Baptist RC Primary School, Padiham
- St John with St Augustine CE Primary School, Accrington
- St John with St Michael CE Primary School, Shawforth
- St John's CE Primary School, Burscough
- St John's CE/Methodist Primary School, Brinscall
- St John's CE Primary School, Cliviger
- St John's CE Primary School, Coppull
- St John's CE Primary School, Great Harwood
- St John's RC Primary School, Burscough
- St John's RC Primary School, Poulton-le-Fylde
- St John's RC Primary School, Skelmersdale
- St John's Stonefold CE Primary School, Accrington
- St Joseph's RC Primary School, Anderton
- St Joseph's RC Primary School, Barnoldswick
- St Joseph's RC Primary School, Chorley
- St Joseph's RC Primary School, Hoghton
- St Joseph's RC Primary School, Hurst Green
- St Joseph's RC Primary School, Lancaster
- St Joseph's RC Primary School, Medlar-with-Wesham
- St Joseph's RC Primary School, Preston
- St Joseph's RC Primary School, Stacksteads
- St Joseph's RC Primary School, Withnell
- St Laurence CE Primary School, Chorley
- St Leonard's CE Primary School, Padiham
- St Maria Goretti RC Primary School, Preston
- St Mark's CE Primary School, Scarisbrick
- St Mary and St Andrew's RC Primary School, Barton
- St Mary Magdalen's CE Primary School, Accrington
- St Mary Magdalen's RC Primary School, Penwortham
- St Mary Magdalene's RC Primary School, Burnley
- St Mary's and St Benedict's RC Primary School, Bamber Bridge
- St Mary's CE Primary School, Eccleston
- St Mary's CE Primary School, Rawtenstall
- St Mary's RC Primary School, Bacup
- St Mary's RC Primary School, Burnley
- St Mary's RC Primary School, Chipping
- St Mary's RC Primary School, Chorley
- St Mary's RC Primary School, Clayton-le-Moors
- St Mary's RC Primary School, Euxton
- St Mary's RC Primary School, Fleetwood
- St Mary's RC Primary School, Great Eccleston
- St Mary's RC Primary School, Haslingden
- St Mary's RC Primary School, Langho
- St Mary's RC Primary School, Leyland
- St Mary's RC Primary School, Morecambe
- St Mary's RC Primary School, Osbaldeston
- St Mary's RC Primary School, Oswaldtwistle
- St Mary's RC Primary School, Sabden
- St Mary's RC Primary School, Scarisbrick
- St Matthew's CE Primary Academy, Preston
- St Michael and St John's RC Primary School, Clitheroe
- St Michael's CE Primary School, Aughton
- St Michael's on Wyre CE Primary School, St Michael's on Wyre
- St Nicholas CE Primary School, Church
- St Oswald's RC Primary School, Accrington
- St Oswald's RC Primary School, Coppull
- St Oswald's RC Primary School, Longton
- St Patrick's RC Primary School, Heysham
- St Patrick's RC Primary School, Walton-le-Dale
- St Paul's CE Primary School, Adlington
- St Paul's CE Primary School, Nelson
- St Paul's CE Primary School, Oswaldtwistle
- St Peter and St Paul RC Primary School, Mawdesley
- St Peter and St Paul's CE Primary School, Rishton
- St Peter's CE Primary School, Accrington
- St Peter's CE Primary School, Burnley
- St Peter's CE Primary School, Chorley
- St Peter's CE Primary School, Fulwood
- St Peter's CE Primary School, Mawdesley
- St Peter's RC Primary School, Lytham St Annes
- St Peter's RC Primary School, Newchurch
- St Philip's CE Primary School, Nelson
- St Richard's RC Primary School, Skelmersdale
- St Stephen's CE Primary School, Burnley
- St Stephen's CE School, Preston
- St Teresa's RC Primary School, Penwortham
- St Teresa's RC Primary School, Preston
- St Teresa's RC Primary School, Upholland
- St Thomas CE Primary School, Lytham St Annes
- St Thomas the Martyr CE Primary School, Upholland
- St Veronica's RC Primary School, Helmshore
- St Wilfred's CE Primary School, Halton
- St Wulstan's and St Edmund's RC Primary Academy, Fleetwood
- St Wulstan's RC Primary School, Great Harwood
- Salesbury CE Primary School, Salesbury
- Salterforth Primary School, Salterforth
- Samlesbury CE School, Samlesbury
- Sandylands Community Primary School, Morecambe
- Scorton CE Primary School, Scorton
- Scotforth St Paul's CE Primary School, Lancaster
- Seven Stars Primary School, Leyland
- Shakespeare Primary School, Fleetwood
- Sharneyford Primary School, Bacup
- Sherwood Primary School, Fulwood
- Silverdale St John's CE VA Primary School
- Simonstone St Peter's CE Primary School, Simonstone
- Singleton CE VA Primary School, Singleton
- Skerton St Luke's CE Primary School, Lancaster
- Slaidburn Brennands Endowed Primary School, Slaidburn
- Slyne with Hest St Luke's CE Primary School
- Spring Hill Community Primary School, Accrington
- Springfield Community Primary School, Burnley
- Staining CE VC Primary School, Singleton
- Stalmine Primary School, Stalmine
- Stanah Primary School, Thornton
- Stoneyholme Community Primary School, Burnley
- Strike Lane Primary School, Freckleton
- Tarleton Community Primary School, Tarleton
- Tarleton Holy Trinity CE Primary School, Tarleton
- Tatham Fells CE Primary School, Tatham
- Thorneyholme RC Primary School, Dunsop Bridge
- Thornton Primary School, Thornton-Cleveleys
- Thurnham Glasson Christ Church CE Primary School, Glasson Dock
- Tonacliffe Primary School, Whitworth
- Torrisholme Community Primary School, Morecambe
- Town Green Primary School, Aughton
- Trawden Forest Primary School, Trawden
- Treales CE Primary School, Treales
- Trinity CE/Methodist Primary School, Buckshaw Village
- Trinity CE/Methodist Primary School, Skelmersdale
- Trinity & St Michael's CE/Methodist Primary School, Croston
- Trumacar Community Primary School, Heysham
- Up Holland Roby Mill CE VA Primary School, Upholland
- Waddington and West Bradford CE Primary School, Waddington
- Walton Le Dale Community Primary School, Walton-le-Dale
- Walton Le Dale St Leonards CE Primary School, Walton-le-Dale
- Walverden Primary School, Nelson
- Warton Archbishop Hutton's Primary School, Warton
- Waterfoot Primary School, Waterfoot
- Weeton Primary School, Weeton
- Weeton St Michael's CE VA Primary School, Weeton
- Wellfield Methodist and Anglican Church School, Burnley
- West End Primary School, Morecambe
- West End Primary School, Ormskirk
- West End Primary School, Oswaldtwistle
- West Street Community Primary School, Colne
- Westgate Primary School, Morecambe
- Westwood Primary School, Clayton-le-Woods
- Whalley CE Primary School, Whalley
- Wheatley Lane Methodist Primary School, Fence
- Whitefield Infant School, Nelson
- Whitefield Primary School, Penwortham
- Whittle-le-Woods CE Primary School, Whittle-le-Woods
- Whittlefield Primary School, Burnley
- Willow Lane Primary School, Lancaster
- Winmarleigh CE Primary School, Winmarleigh
- Withnell Fold Primary School, Withnell
- Woodlands Community Primary School, Skelmersdale
- Woodlea Junior School, Leyland
- Woodnook Primary School, Accrington
- Woodplumpton St Anne's CE Primary School, Woodplumpton
- Worsthorne Primary School, Worsthorne
- Wray with Botton Endowed Primary School, Wray
- Wrightington Mossy Lea Primary School, Wrightington
- Wrightington St Joseph's RC Primary School, Wrightington
- Yealand CE Primary School, Yealand Redmayne

=== Non-selective secondary schools ===
- Academy@Worden, Leyland
- Accrington Academy, Accrington
- Albany Academy, Chorley
- Alder Grange School, Rawtenstall
- All Hallows Catholic High School, Penwortham
- All Saints' Catholic High School, Rawtenstall
- Archbishop Temple School, Fulwood
- Ashton Community Science College, Ashton
- Baines School, Poulton-le-Fylde
- Balshaw's CE High School, Leyland
- Bay Leadership Academy, Heysham
- Bishop Rawstorne CofE Academy, Croston
- Blessed Trinity RC College, Burnley
- Bowland High School, Grindleton
- Broughton High School, Broughton
- Brownedge St Mary's Catholic High School, Bamber Bridge
- Burnley High School, Burnley
- Burscough Priory Academy, Burscough
- Cardinal Allen Catholic High School, Fleetwood
- Carnforth High School, Carnforth
- Carr Hill High School, Kirkham
- Central Lancaster High School, Lancaster
- Christ the King Catholic High School, Preston
- Colne Primet Academy, Colne
- Corpus Christi Catholic High School, Fulwood
- Eden Boys' School, Preston
- Fleetwood High School, Fleetwood
- Fulwood Academy, Fulwood
- Garstang Community Academy, Bowgreave
- Haslingden High School, Haslingden
- Hodgson Academy, Poulton-le-Fylde
- The Hollins, Accrington
- Holy Cross Catholic High School, Chorley
- Hutton Grammar School, Hutton
- The Hyndburn Academy, Rishton
- Lathom High School, Skelmersdale
- Longridge High School, Longridge
- Lostock Hall Academy, Lostock Hall
- Lytham St Annes High School, Lytham St Annes
- Maharishi School, Lathom
- Marsden Heights Community College, Brierfield
- Millfield Science & Performing Arts College, Thornton
- Moor Park High School, Preston
- Morecambe Bay Academy, Morecambe
- Mount Carmel RC High School, Accrington
- Ormskirk School, Ormskirk
- Our Lady Queen of Peace Catholic Engineering College, Skelmersdale
- Our Lady's Catholic College, Lancaster
- Our Lady's Catholic High School, Fulwood
- Park High School, Colne
- Parklands High School, Chorley
- Pendle Vale College, Nelson
- Penwortham Girls' High School, Penwortham
- Penwortham Priory Academy, Penwortham
- Preston Muslim Girls High School, Preston
- Rhyddings, Oswaldtwistle
- Ribblesdale High School, Clitheroe
- Ripley St Thomas Church of England Academy, Lancaster
- St Aidan's CE High School, Preesall
- St Augustine's RC High School, Billington
- St Bede's Catholic High School, Lytham St Annes
- St Bede's Catholic High School, Ormskirk
- St Cecilia's RC High School, Longridge
- St Christopher's CE High School, Accrington
- St Mary's RC High School, Leyland
- St Michael's CE High School, Chorley
- Ss John Fisher and Thomas More RC High School, Colne
- Shuttleworth College, Padiham
- Sir John Thursby Community College, Burnley
- Southlands High School, Chorley
- Tarleton Academy, Tarleton
- Unity College, Burnley
- Up Holland High School, Upholland
- The Valley Leadership Academy, Bacup
- Walton-le-Dale High School, Bamber Bridge
- Wellfield Academy, Leyland
- West Craven High School, Barnoldswick
- Whitworth Community High School, Whitworth

=== Grammar schools ===
- Clitheroe Royal Grammar School, Clitheroe
- Lancaster Girls' Grammar School, Lancaster
- Lancaster Royal Grammar School, Lancaster

=== Special and alternative schools ===
- Acorns Primary School, Preston
- The Acorns School, Ormskirk
- Bleasdale School, Silverdale
- Broadfield Specialist School, Oswaldtwistle
- Brookfield School, Poulton Le Fylde
- Chadwick High School, Skerton
- Chorley Astley Park School, Chorley
- Coal Clough Academy, Burnley
- The Coppice School, Bamber Bridge
- Elm Tree Community Primary School, Skelmersdale
- Golden Hill Pupil Referral Unit, Leyland
- Great Arley School, Thornton Clevelys
- The Heights, Burnley
- Hillside Specialist School, Longridge
- Holly Grove School, Burnley
- Hope High School, Skelmersdale
- Kingsbury Primary Special School, Skelmersdale
- Kirkham Pear Tree School, Kirkham
- Larches High School, Preston
- Lostock Hall Moor Hey School, Lostock Hall
- The Loyne Specialist School, Lancaster
- Mayfield School, Chorley
- McKee College House, Poulton
- Moorbrook School, Fulwood
- Morecambe Road School, Morecambe
- Oswaldtwistle School, Oswaldtwistle
- Oswaldtwistle White Ash School, Oswaldtwistle
- Pendle Community High School, Nelson
- Pendle View Primary School, Colne
- Pontville School, Ormskirk
- Rawtenstall Cribden House Community Special School, Rawtenstall
- Ridgewood Community High School, Burnley
- The Rose School, Burnley
- Royal Cross Primary School, Ashton-on-Ribble
- Shaftesbury High School, Chorley
- Sir Tom Finney Community High School, Preston
- Stepping Stones School, Lancaster
- Thornton-Cleveleys Red Marsh School, Thornton Clevelys
- Tor View School, Haslingden
- West Lancashire Community High School, Skelmersdale
- Westmorland School, Chorley

=== Further education ===
- Accrington and Rossendale College
- The Adult College, Lancaster
- Blackpool and The Fylde College
- Burnley College
- Cardinal Newman College
- Lancashire College
- Lancaster University School of Mathematics
- Lancaster and Morecambe College
- Myerscough College
- Nelson and Colne College
- Preston's College
- Runshaw College
- Thomas Whitham Sixth Form
- West Lancashire College

== Independent schools ==
=== Primary and preparatory schools ===
- Al-Ikhlaas Primary School, Nelson
- Ashbridge School, Hutton
- Highfield Priory School, Fulwood
- Imam Muhammad Zakariya School, Preston
- Lancaster Steiner School, Lancaster
- Rawdhatul Uloom, Burnley
- St Joseph's Park Hill School, Burnley
- St Pius X Preparatory School, Fulwood
- Stonyhurst Saint Mary's Hall, Hurst Green

=== Senior and all-through schools ===
- Abrar Academy, Preston
- The Alternative School, Barnoldswick
- AKS Lytham, Lytham St Annes
- Edenfield Girls High School, Edenfield
- Ghausia Girls' High School, Nelson
- Heathland School, Accrington
- Jamea Al Kauthar, Lancaster
- Kirkham Grammar School, Kirkham
- Moorland School, Clitheroe
- Oakhill School, Whalley
- Olive High, Burnley
- OneSchool Global UK, Hornby
- Rossall School, Rossall
- St Annes College Grammar School, Lytham St Annes
- Scarisbrick Hall School, Scarisbrick
- Stonyhurst College, Hurst Green

=== Special and alternative schools ===
- Aurora Brambles School, Midge Hall
- Aurora Keyes Barn School, Salwick
- Austen House, Haslingden
- Belmont School, Rawtenstall
- Bridgeway School, Bamber Bridge
- Calder Lodge School, Oakenclough
- Cambian Brook View School, Ribchester
- Cambian Red Rose School, Bamber Bridge
- Compass Community School Lancashire, Briercliffe
- Crookhey Hall School, Cockerham
- Cumberland School, Rivington
- Grow Independent School, Barrowford
- Hope School, Catforth
- Learn 4 Life School, Skelmersdale
- Lincoln House School, Burnley
- Linton School, Freckleton
- Maple House, Eccles
- Mayfield House School, Chorley
- Meadow View Learning Centre, Chorley
- Moorlands View School, Dunnockshaw
- The Nook School, Colne
- Oakfield House School, Salwick
- Oliver House School, Astley Village
- Pioneer TEC, Preston
- Pontville School, Ormskirk
- Poplar House School, Lytham St Annes
- Progress School, Bamber Bridge
- Prospect House, Yealand Redmayne
- Red Rose School, Lytham St Annes
- Rosa House, Briercliffe
- Roselyn House School, Leyland
- Rossendale School, Ramsbottom
- Springfield House School, Pilling
- Stonegate School, Lancaster
- Waterloo Lodge, Chorley
- Westmorland School, Chorley
- Wood Edge Independent School, Ormskirk
