= Girls' High School =

Girls' High School or Girls High School may refer to:

== Australia ==
- Asquith Girls High School
- Bankstown Girls High School
- Birrong Girls High School
- Blacktown Girls High School
- Burwood Girls High School
- Cheltenham Girls High School
- Cremorne Girls High School
- East Hills Girls High School
- Hornsby Girls' High School
- Macarthur Girls High School
- Mac.Robertson Girls' High School
- North Sydney Girls High School
- Petersham Girls High School
- Randwick Girls' High School
- Riverside Girls High School
- St George Girls High School
- Strathfield Girls High School
- Sydney Girls High School
- Wiley Park Girls High School
- Willoughby Girls High School

== Bangladesh ==
- Nawab Faizunnesa Government Girls' High School

== India ==
- Girls' High School, Kanpur, formally Methodist High School, Kanpur, Uttar Pradesh

== Kenya ==
- Alliance Girls High School

== Malaysia ==
- Penang Chinese Girls' High School

== New Zealand ==
- Avonside Girls' High School
- Christchurch Girls' High School
- Gisborne Girls' High School
- Hamilton Girls' High School
- Napier Girls' High School
- New Plymouth Girls' High School
- Otago Girls' High School
- Palmerston North Girls' High School
- Rotorua Girls' High School
- Southland Girls' High School
- Timaru Girls' High School
- Waitaki Girls' High School
- Westlake Girls High School

== Singapore ==
- Nanyang Girls' High School

== South Africa ==
- Durban Girls' High School
- Ellerslie Girls' High School
- Northlands Girls' High School
- Pietermaritzburg Girls' High School
- Pinetown Girls' High School
- Waverley Girls' High School
- Wynberg Girls' High School

== Sri Lanka ==
- Girls' High School, Kandy, Sri Lanka

== United Kingdom ==
- Leeds Girls' High School, in Headingley, Leeds, West Yorkshire, England
- Newport Girls' High School, in Newport, Shropshire, England
- Nottingham Girls' High School, in Nottingham, England
- Penwortham Girls' High School, in Lancashire, England
- Preston Muslim Girls High School, in Lancashire, England
- Skipton Girls' High School, in Skipton, North Yorkshire, England
- Tauheedul Islam Girls' High School, in Beardwood, Blackburn, England
- Wakefield Girls' High School, in Wakefield, England

== United States ==
- Girls' High School (Brooklyn), a former high school building in Brooklyn, New York
- Girls High School (Atlanta), later Roosevelt High School, a former high school in Georgia
- Girls' High School (Boston, Massachusetts), a former high school
- Girls High School (San Francisco), a former school in California
- Girls High School, Philadelphia, formally Philadelphia High School for Girls, in Pennsylvania
- J. W. Hallahan Catholic Girls High School, in Philadelphia, Pennsylvania
- St. Peter's Girls High School, in Staten Island, New York

== Zimbabwe ==
- Girls High School, Harare

== See also ==
- Boys High School (disambiguation)
