= Boys High School =

Boys High School or Boys' High School may refer to:

== Australia ==
- Ashfield Boys High School
- Blacktown Boys High School
- Canterbury Boys' High School
- Crows Nest Boys High School
- Dover Heights Boys High School
- Drummoyne Boys' High School
- East Hills Boys High School
- Epping Boys High School
- Granville Boys High School
- Homebush Boys High School
- Liverpool Boys High School
- Newcastle Boys' High School
- Normanhurst Boys' High School
- North Sydney Boys High School
- Otago Boys' High School
- Punchbowl Boys High School
- Randwick Boys High School
- Sydney Boys High School
- Westlake Boys High School

== Bangladesh ==
- Dhanmondi Government Boys' High School
- Gaibandha Government Boys' High School
- Kishorganj Govt. Boys' High School
- Motijheel Government Boys' High School
- Natore Government Boys High School
- Rani Bilashmoni Government Boys' High School
- Sher-e-Bangla Nagar Government Boys' High School
- Siddheswari Boys' High School

== India ==
- Baldwin Boys' High School
- Boys' High School & College (Allahabad, Uttar Pradesh)
- Govt. Boys' High School, Gunupur
- MahaRaja's Boys' High School
- Sacred Heart Boys High School
- St Joseph's Boys' High School, Bangalore
- St Joseph's Boys' High School, Pune
- St. Thomas (SPG) Boys' High School
- Sri Narayan Vidyabhaban Boys' High School

== Kenya ==
- Nakuru Boys High School
- St. Luke's Boys' High School

== New Zealand ==
- Christchurch Boys' High School
- Gisborne Boys' High School
- Hastings Boys' High School
- Hamilton Boys' High School
- Kelston Boys' High School
- Napier Boys' High School
- New Plymouth Boys' High School
- Otago Boys' High School
- Palmerston North Boys' High School
- Rotorua Boys' High School
- Shirley Boys' High School
- Southland Boys' High School
- Timaru Boys' High School
- Waitaki Boys' High School

== Nigeria ==
- Baptist Boys' High School
- Eko Boys' High School
- Methodist Boys' High School, Lagos
- Methodist Boys' High School, Oron

== Sierra Leone ==
- Methodist Boys' High School (Sierra Leone)

== South Africa ==
- Athlone Boys' High School
- Dale College Boys' High School
- Kimberley Boys' High School
- Paarl Boys' High School
- Parktown Boys' High School
- Pinetown Boys' High School
- Pretoria Boys High School
- Queen's College Boys' High School
- Rondebosch Boys' High School
- Springs Boys' High School
- Westville Boys' High School
- Wynberg Boys' High School

== Turkey ==
- Kabataş Boys High School
- Bursa Boys High School

== United Kingdom ==
- Ashfield Boys' High School, in Belfast, Northern Ireland
- St Joseph's Boys' High School, Newry, in Newry, Northern Ireland
- Tauheedul Islam Boys' High School, in Blackburn, Lancashire, England

== United States ==
- Boys High School (Brooklyn), a former school in Brooklyn, New York
  - Boys and Girls High School, its successor school
- Midtown High School (Atlanta), in Atlanta, Georgia, known as Boys High School from 1924 to 1947
- St. Agnes Boys High School, a former school in Brooklyn, New York
- Warren Easton High School, in New Orleans, Louisiana, known as Boys High School from 1843 to 1967

== Zimbabwe ==
- Cranborne Boys High School
- Mazowe Boys High School
- Oriel Boys' High School

== See also ==
- Seiho Boys' High School!, a Japanese manga
- Girls' High School (disambiguation)
