= CLH =

CLH may refer to:

== Science ==
- Chlorophyllase, an enzyme
- Hydrogen chloride, a chemical compound

== Companies ==
- CLH (company), a Spanish petroleum logistics company comprising Compañía Logística de Hidrocarburos and others
  - CLH Pipeline System (CLH-PS), a UK system run by Compañía Logística de Hidrocarburos
- Lufthansa CityLine (ICAO code), a German airline
- Coolah Airport, IATA airport code "CLH"

== See also ==
- CLHS (disambiguation)
