= Star Academies =

UK multi-academy trust

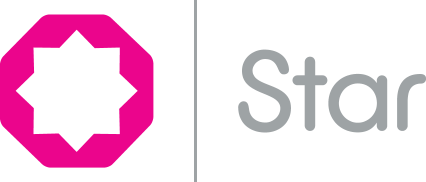
- Founder: Sir (Mufti) Hameed Patel
- Type: Academy Trust
- Registration no.: 07353849
- Purpose: Education
- Headquarters: Shadsworth Rd, Blackburn BB1 2HT
- Location: Blackburn
- Region served: United Kingdom, primarily England
- Services: 4-18 education
- Key people: Sir (Mufti) Hamid Patel, CEO
- Website: staracademies.org
- Formerly called: Tauheedul Education Trust

Star Academies is a multi-academy trust (MAT) that operates 36 free schools and academies. There are nineteen secondary schools and nine primary schools under the jurisdiction of the trust.

As a multi-academy trust, Star Academies is an exempt charity regulated by the Department for Education. 21 of the schools under Star Academy have Muslim religious character, 10 of which have been rated Outstanding by Ofsted, with the other 5 still waiting to be graded.

The trust's change of name from Tauheedul Education Trust followed its change of focus; it had originally only been responsible for Islamic schools, but expanded to secular and Christian schools. In 2022, the school was planning to open three additional free schools in the north of England in partnership with Eton College. After a pause to review the proposals, in 2025 it was announced that two of the schools would be approved whilst the proposed college in Middlesbrough would be cancelled.

== Controversies ==
In February 2019, specific concerns about the performance of Highfield Leadership Academy led the DfE to issue a "minded to terminate" letter to the trust, suggesting that they might remove the trust's funding for this school.

However in September 2019, Ofsted stated that the academy had much improved. In February 2020, Ofsted wrote:

Since the last monitoring inspection, more pupils are benefiting from high-quality teaching. Many teachers present subject matter in a way that helps pupils to develop their knowledge and understanding." Although, Ofsted have still identified areas for improvement, the academy stands today as a good school, albeit a strict one.

In 2025, members of the National Education Union at The Valley Leadership Academy voted in favour of striking over Star Academies' introduction of a virtual maths teacher, eventually taking part in two days of strike action in December 2025. The virtual teacher, based 300 miles away in Devon, was a part of a pilot scheme by the trust that aimed to overcome difficulties finding subject-specific teachers. In response to the backlash, Star Academies stated that they did not intend for the scheme's rollout, which currently includes three virtual teachers across its schools, to be widespread.

== Secondary schools ==
- Bacup and Rawtenstall Grammar School, Waterfoot
- Bay Leadership Academy, Heysham
- Highfield Leadership Academy, Blackpool
- Laisterdyke Leadership Academy, Bradford
- Oulder Hill Leadership Academy, Rochdale
- Small Heath Leadership Academy, Small Heath
- Eden Boys' Leadership Academy, Birmingham East, Saltley
- Starbank School, Birmingham
- Tauheedul Islam Boys' High School, Blackburn
- Tauheedul Islam Girls' High School, Blackburn
- The Valley Leadership Academy, Stacksteads
- Tong Leadership Academy, Bradford
