= Little Harwood =

Suburb of Blackburn, England)

Coordinates: 53.7587°N 2.4664°W

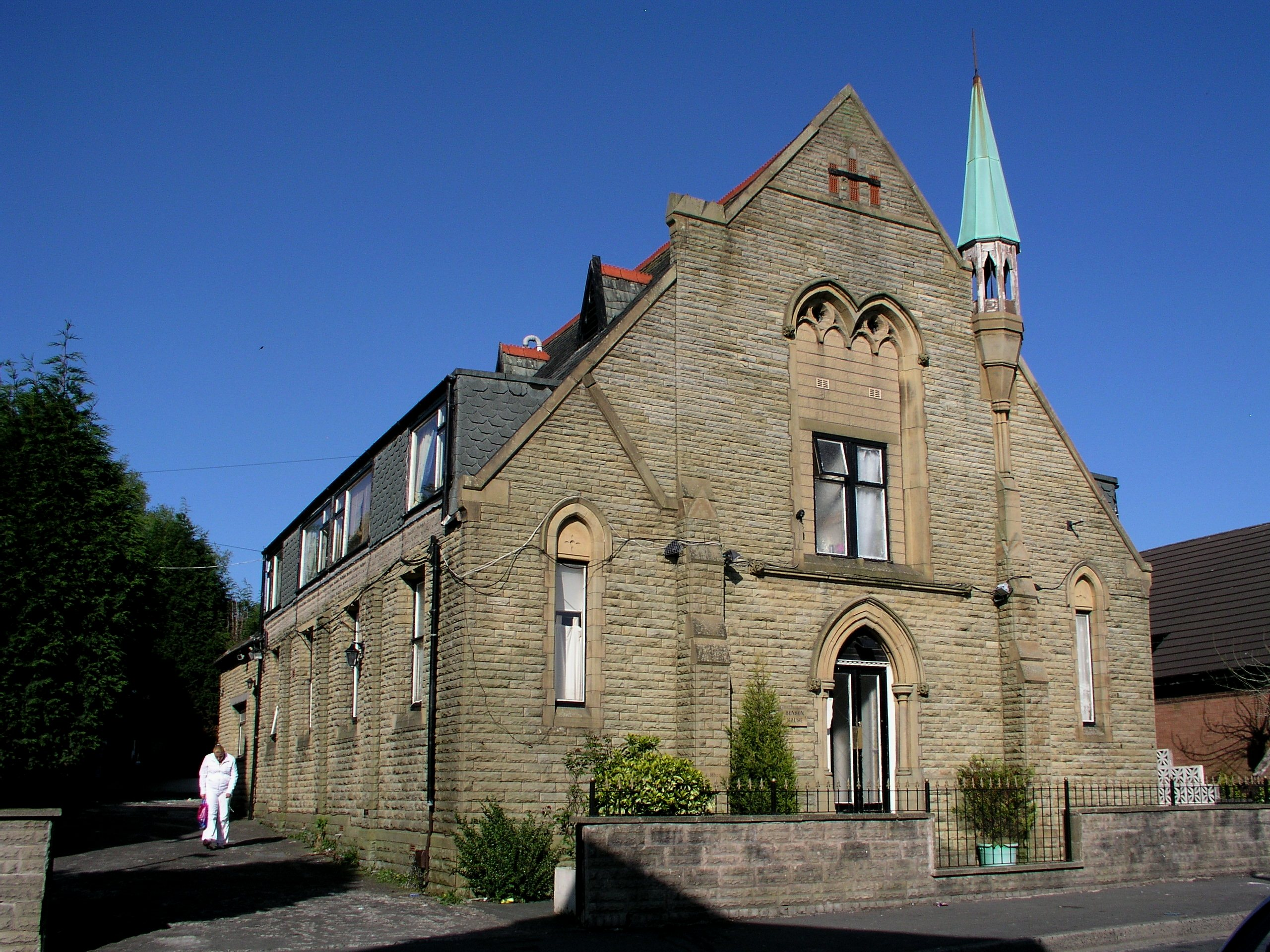

- Shown within Blackburn Shown within Blackburn with Darwen Location within Lancashire
- Unitary authority: Blackburn with Darwen
- Ceremonial county: Lancashire
- Region: North West
- Country: England
- Sovereign state: United Kingdom
- Post town: Blackburn
- Postcode district: BB1, BB2
- Dialling code: 01254
- Police: Lancashire
- Fire: Lancashire
- Ambulance: North West

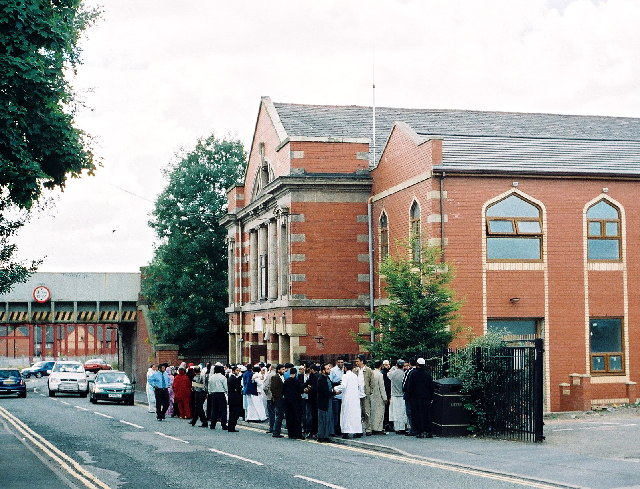
Islamic Centre, Little Harwood, Blackburn

Little Harwood is a suburb of Blackburn in the Blackburn with Darwen district, in the ceremonial county of Lancashire, England, situated at the northern edge of the town.

== Use of land ==
Located within the ward are areas of mixed housing, industrial units and open land, including Blackburn Cemetery.

== Culture ==
Little Harwood is a multi-cultural place and there are many mosques and churches in the suburb to cater for the various religious denominations of Blackburn and its surrounding areas.

The Little Harwood Clock Tower was unveiled in 1923 and the hourly chime can still be heard in memory of the local lads that fell during the two World Wars. Its gardens are maintained regularly by council gardeners and provide a quiet alternative to the busy Whalley Old Road.

== Education ==
There are two state-funded schools located in the ward of Little Harwood: St Stephen's CE Primary School and Tauheedul Islam Boys' High School. St Stephen's was formed 2010 when an infants and junior school combined on one site on Robinson Street at a multi-coloured rectangular building costing around £7million. Tauheedul Islam Boys' High School is a free school which opened in 2012. There are also two private schools within the ward of Little Harwood; Madressa-e-Islamia Educational Centre and Jamiatul-llm Wal Huda UK School.

== History ==
Little Harwood was formerly a township in the parish of Blackburn, in 1866 Little Harwood became a separate civil parish, on 25 March 1893 the parish was abolished and merged with Blackburn. In 1891 the parish had a population of 1190. It is now in the unparished area of Blackburn.

== Notable people ==
Little Harwood is well known as the birthplace of Jack Walker, owner of Walker Steel and Flybe and benefactor of Blackburn Rovers FC, whose parents lived on Whalley Old Road.
