= Natalie Aspinall =

English football assistant referee

Natalie Aspinall (née Walker; born 1981 or 1982) is an English former football referee and assistant referee. She was an assistant referee at the FIFA Women's World Cup in 2011, 2015 and 2023. From 2022 to 2026 she was an assistant referee in the Premier League, the third woman to hold such a position.

== Career ==
Aspinall, of Blackpool, began refereeing at age 14 as a way to make money, as she did not think she could wake up early enough for a newspaper round. Though her father had 25 years of experience as a referee, and she competed in many sports at Highfield High School, she did not know football's Laws of the Game and had hardly played the game. After completing a course on the Laws of the Game, she began refereeing in children's football, and moved into being an assistant referee in men's football's West Lancashire Football League when she was 16, eventually becoming a referee in the league.

In 2007, the Football Association nominated Aspinall as a FIFA international referee. She was part of the officials at three Women's FA Cup finals, including once as referee, and at the FIFA Women's World Cups of 2011, 2015 and 2023. After being an assistant referee in the 2016 National League play-off final, she was promoted to the English Football League, where she officiated between 2016 and 2022.

For the 2022–23 Premier League season, she was named as part of the PGMOL Select Group One. She became the third woman to be an assistant referee in the Premier League, after Wendy Toms and Sian Massey-Ellis. She said "I don't feel like I'm an inspiration - I just feel like I'm doing what I'm doing, but I hope that by me doing this it makes it easier for, not just female referees, but any referees to come through the pathway and achieve their potential". She retired at the end of the 2025–26 season.

== Personal life ==
Aspinall did a sports studies degree at Edge Hill University, where she met her husband Richard. In 2015, she was a sports lecturer at Preston College. She had her first daughter in January 2014, having timed her pregnancy between editions of the FIFA Women's World Cup. She had a second daughter around 2018.
