= Haslingden High School =

Haslingden High School and Sixth Form

Location
- Broadway; Haslingden, Lancashire, BB4 4EY; England; 53°41′22″N 2°19′13″W

Information
- Type: Community school
- Motto: Achievement for all
- Local authority: Lancashire
- Department for Education URN: 119767 Tables
- Ofsted: Reports
- Headteacher: Russell Clarke
- Gender: Coeducational
- Age: 11 to 18
- Enrolment: 1594
- Houses: Rowan, Beech, Oak, Hazel, Willow
- Colours: Red, blue, yellow, green, orange
- Website: haslingdenhigh.com

Haslingden High School is a secondary school located in Haslingden, Rossendale, England. The school receives children from many local primary schools, one of the largest being Haslingden Primary School.

== History ==
The two schools in Haslingden that preceded the school were Haslingden Grammar School on Bury Road, which was knocked down in 1997, and turned into a housing development, and Haslingden County Secondary School on Ryefield Avenue, which later on was turned into a primary school led by headteacher Glynn Elis.

== Performance ==
In the most recent inspection by Ofsted, the main school was awarded "Good" in all criteria. The sixth form was also graded as "Outstanding" for care, advice and guidance. Exam results have risen for the last five years, with increasing results in ICT, English Literature, Religious Studies and BTEC Sport.

GCSE results are often above the English national average. It is notable for being one of the few Lancashire comprehensive schools with a sixth form college.

== Admissions ==
The school is led by headteacher Russell Clarke. It runs a faculty system, each headed by a curriculum leader. The pastoral system at Haslingden High School includes heads of lower, middle and upper schools leading learning mentors in each year group.

The sixth form is led by Lauren Marsland, Director of Sixth Form Studies. The Sixth Form at Haslingden is part of the main school and many of the high school students go on to complete Post-16 study at Haslingden's sixth form. Students have also joined from other local schools such as Bacup and Rawtenstall Grammar School, All Saints Catholic Language College in Rawtenstall, Fearns Community Sports College in Bacup and Alder Grange Community and Technology School in Rawtenstall.

== Notable former pupils ==
- Sam Aston, actor who plays Chesney Brown on Coronation Street
- Antony Higginbotham, Conservative MP for Burnley
- Connie Hyde, British actress
- Sophie Lancaster, murder victim
- Keira Walsh, England International and Manchester City footballer

=== Haslingden Grammar School ===
- Sir Rhodes Boyson, Conservative MP for Brent North from 1974 to 1997
- Sharon Hollows, headteacher at Ark Charter Academy and other schools, made DBE (Dame Commander of the Most Excellent Order of the British Empire) in 2001
