= Small Heath Leadership Academy =

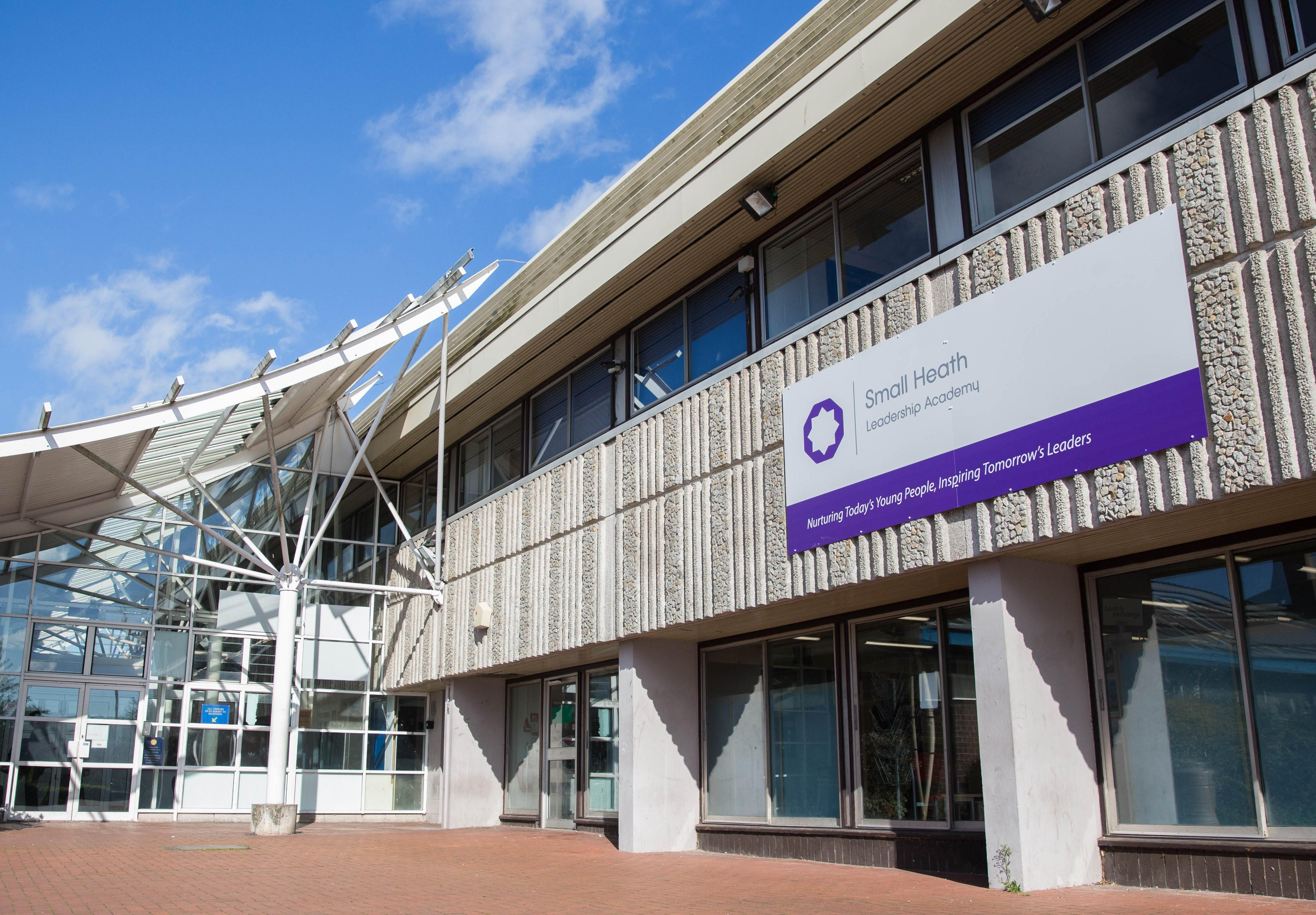

Location
- Muntz Street; Small Heath; Birmingham, West Midlands, B10 9RX; England; 52.4647°N 1.8577°W

Information
- Type: Academy
- Motto: Nurturing today’s young people, inspiring tomorrow’s leaders.
- Established: 1892
- Local authority: Birmingham City Council
- Trust: Star Academies
- Department for Education URN: 144464 Tables
- Ofsted: Reports
- Principal: Yasmin Manzoor
- Gender: Co-educational
- Age: 11 to 18
- Enrolment: 1,105
- Website: https://www.smallheathleadershipacademy.com

Small Heath Leadership Academy is a co-educational secondary school and used to also include a sixth form located in the Small Heath area of Birmingham, England. The school serves an inner-city area of Birmingham.

== History ==
It was built as a Birmingham board school in 1892 by architects Martin & Chamberlain and is a Grade II* listed building. It later became the co-educational Waverley Grammar School, and then the comprehensive Small Heath School.

The school was awarded specialist Technology College status, and has been recognised as a High Performing Specialist School. It was awarded Raising Attainment and Pupil Progress mentor status in 2008, which recognises the school's work in raising students' achievement.

Small Heath School was previously located in two buildings on Muntz Street and Waverley Road. In September 2017 all students were located at Muntz Street.

Previously a foundation school administered by Birmingham City Council, in January 2018 Small Heath School converted to academy status and renamed Small Heath Leadership Academy. The school is now sponsored by Star Academies.

== Academics ==
Small Heath Leadership Academy offers GCSEs and Cambridge Nationals as programmes of study for pupils. The school no longer offers A-Levels and the Sixth Form has been discontinued.

== Notable former pupils ==
=== Small Heath Leadership Academy ===
- Rowland Emett, cartoonist
- Di Trevis, theatre director
- Shabana Mahmood, Home Secretary of the United Kingdom and Labour MP for Birmingham ladywood since 2010.

== Sources ==
Pevsner Architectural Guides - Birmingham, Andy Foster, 2005, ISBN 0-300-10731-5

- Victorian Architecture in Britain - Blue Guide, Julian Orbach, 1987, ISBN 0-393-30070-6
- Historic England. "Details from listed building text - school (1211189)". National Heritage List for England.
- Historic England. "Details from listed building text - attached Master's house (1075691)". National Heritage List for England.
