= Oulder Hill Leadership Academy =

Location
- Hudsons Walk; Rochdale, Greater Manchester, OL11 5EF; England
- Coordinates: 53.6176°N 2.1873°W

Information
- Type: Academy
- Motto: Nurturing Today’s Young People, Inspiring Tomorrow’s Leaders
- Local authority: Rochdale
- Trust: Star Academies
- Department for Education URN: 148847 Tables
- Ofsted: Reports
- Headteacher: Vacant
- Gender: Co-educational
- Age: 11 to 16
- Enrolment: 1,175
- Colour: Teal
- Website: https://www.oulderhillacademy.com/

Oulder Hill Leadership Academy (formerly Oulder Hill Community School) is a co-educational secondary school for 11 to 16 year olds, located in Rochdale, Greater Manchester, England.

== History ==
The school fully opened to students aged 13–16 in 1977 under the leadership of its first head, Dr Morris. At that time, it was the largest school in the Metropolitan Borough of Rochdale, with over 1000 students. The school's facilities included the Gracie Fields theatre, a 25-metre swimming pool, tennis courts, and fields for football and rugby.

In 2003, the school merged with Rydings Special School, a local school for children with disabilities. The merger prompted a reconstruction of the school, which began in 2005 and was completed in 2008. This involved the redevelopment of the current site and constructing a new building on the former playing fields and tennis courts. The Oulder Hill School building remained with the same name, while Rydings Special School was rebranded as Redwood Secondary school. The building is now owned by OPERON, and the school pays £1 million annually to rent the facilities from 6 am to 6 pm.

Once a thriving part of the school, Oulder Hill's sixth form began to decline from the year 2000 onwards. The sixth form closed to new students when Rochdale Sixth Form College opened in September 2010. At the time of its closure, the sixth form had approximately 150 students, a decline from the over 600 students it had when first established.

Previously a community school administered by Rochdale Metropolitan Borough Council, Oulder Hill Community School converted to academy status in March 2022 and was renamed Oulder Hill Leadership Academy due to having an inadequate rating in Ofsted. It is now sponsored by Star Academies.

It is currently a Good school.

== Notable former pupils ==
- Waterloo Road star Shannon Flynn attended the school
- Singer-songwriter Lisa Stansfield attended Oulder Hill
