= Central Lancaster High School =

Lancaster High School

Location
- Crag Road; Lancaster, Lancashire, LA1 3LS; England; 54.0542°N 2.7826°W

Information
- Type: Academy
- Established: 1986
- Local authority: Lancaster
- Trust: The Bay Learning Trust
- Department for Education URN: 147260 Tables
- Ofsted: Reports
- Head teacher: Colin Malone
- Gender: Coeducational
- Age: 11 to 16
- Enrolment: 750
- Colours: , ,
- Website: https://www.lancasterhigh.lancs.sch.uk/

Lancaster High School (LHS) is a coeducational secondary school located in Lancaster, England. Located on Crag Road on the Ridge area in east Lancaster.

== History ==
Lancaster High School originally opened in 1966 as Castle Secondary Modern School but in 1986 amalgamated with Greaves Secondary Modern School from the south side of Lancaster, moving all the Greaves pupils up to the larger more modern site on Crag Road and renaming the two amalgamated schools as Central Lancaster High School. The two sites that belonged to Greaves School were either demolished or renovated and made into flats and houses. The school was awarded specialist Arts College status. The school catered for pupils aged 11–18.

Lancaster High School was represented in the English Schools FA cup by its year 11 team in 2010/11. They enjoyed success by reaching the semi-final stage and narrowly missed out on reaching the final.

Previously a community school administered by Lancashire County Council, in October 2018 Central Lancaster High School converted to academy status. The school is now sponsored by The Bay Learning Trust.

After their £8 million new Ashton building opening in 2024. The school went through a name and uniform change ready for the next academic year in September 2025. Changing from Central Lancaster High School to Lancaster High School. Changing their uniform from black to navy. Changing their logo from a red 'C', to the Lancaster castle and the Lancashire rose.

== Curriculum ==
Virtually all maintained schools and academies follow the National Curriculum, and are inspected by Ofsted on how well they succeed in delivering a 'broad and balanced curriculum'. Key Stage 3 contains years 7, 8 and 9- and in years 10 and 11 the students study subjects that will be examined by the GCSE exams at 16. The school operates a two-week timetable consisting of five one-hour lessons per day. This equates to 50 periods over the fortnightly cycle. Statutory obligations are met through PHSE, Social Development and careers lessons. In years 10-11 it guides pupils into a wide range of subject options.

=== Key Stage 3 ===
Years 7, 8 and 9 are delivered through a broad and balanced curriculum, allowing pupils to develop skills and knowledge across a wide range of subjects. Teaching is mainly mixed ability.

=== Key Stage 4 ===
All pupils study maths, English Language, and English Literature. Students have an option to pick either triple science or combined science in year 9 when picking their subjects to study for GCSE. The school ensures that the Ebacc is available to all pupils as part of the curriculum design, although there is no compulsion for pupils to opt for the Ebacc suite of subjects:a significant majority of pupils do studying history, geography or French (or a combination of all three). Other options are available in years 10 and 11, including: ICT/Computing, Music, PE, Art, Travel & Tourism, Business Studies, Textiles, Performing Arts (Dance/Drama), Design & Technology (Resistant Materials), Child Development & Care, Catering, and Practical Horticulture.

== Former Sixth Form ==
The Lancaster High School opened a sixth form in September 2011. The Mayor of Lancaster officially opened it. The sixth form courses were offered as part of the North Lancashire Learning Partnership which also included Carnforth High School and Our Lady's Catholic College. It was closed at the end of the academic year 2017–2018, the school converted to an eleven to sixteen academy.

== Sport ==
Lancaster High School has a very successful history of football, with the U16s boys' team reaching the semi-final of the English Schools FA CUP in 2011. In 2014, the year ten boys' cricket team won the district trophy for the first time beating all the other schools in the area, while in 2015 the year eleven boys won the district football cup beating Heysham High School at Morecambe Football Club's Globe Arena ground. They also have a very successful year ten girls' sports team, who won the district trophy in football and also reached the fourth round in the English Schools FA Cup.
