= Beardwood =

Village suburb of Blackburn in Lancashire, England

Coordinates: 53.760°N 2.511°W

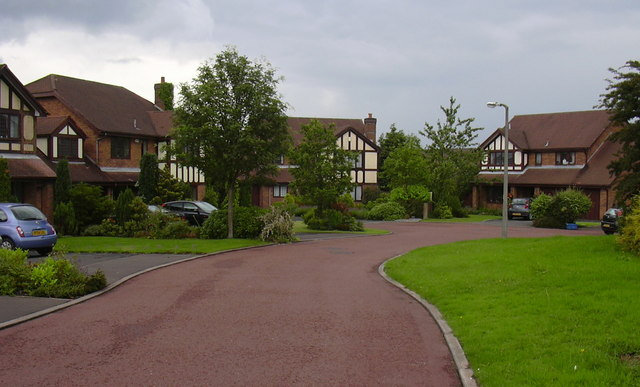
- The Brambles, Beardwood (2007)

- Shown within Blackburn Shown within Blackburn with Darwen Location within Lancashire
- OS grid reference: SD663294
- Unitary authority: Blackburn with Darwen
- Ceremonial county: Lancashire
- Region: North West
- Country: England
- Sovereign state: United Kingdom
- Post town: Blackburn
- Postcode district: BB2
- Dialling code: 01254
- Police: Lancashire
- Fire: Lancashire
- Ambulance: North West
- UK Parliament: Blackburn

Beardwood is a village suburb of Blackburn in Lancashire, England. It is relatively close to the village of Mellor and has a local high school. It lies on the western edge of Blackburn, a few miles away from Blackburn town centre.

In 2013, the Tauheedul Islam Girls' High School moved to Beardwood.
