= Matthew Moulding =

British business person (born 1972)

- Born: Matthew John Moulding; February 1972 (age 54); Burnley, England
- Education: University of Nottingham
- Occupation: Entrepreneur
- Known for: Founder and CEO of THG plc
- Spouse: Jodie Moulding
- Children: 4

Matthew John Moulding (born February 1972) is a British businessman, founder and CEO of THG plc. According to the Sunday Times Rich List 2022, he has an estimated net worth of £700 million, down from £1.4 billion in 2021.

== Early life ==
Moulding was born in Burnley, Lancashire, and attended Ss John Fisher and Thomas More Roman Catholic High School in Colne.

Moulding studied industrial economics at the University of Nottingham before going on to qualify as a chartered accountant. His father was a tarmac contractor and his mother an antiques trader.

== Career ==
Before founding The Hut Group, Moulding worked as CFO for the distribution business of Caudwell Group, working directly with John Caudwell.

In 2004, Moulding founded The Hut Group in Manchester, inspired by buying a CD online. He said that he recognised that selling online could be "fundamentally so much cheaper". The company was founded with a £500,000 investment by Matt Moulding and John Gallemore. The company sold CDs and DVDs online before creating white-label web stores for large physical retailers, including Asda, Argos Entertainment, Tesco and WHSmith.

The creation of the iPhone in 2007 undermined this business model and The Hut Group began acquiring internet retailers and moving them into the group's existing systems and warehouses. The company purchased Zavvi in 2009, Lookfantastic in 2010 and Myprotein in 2011. The group focused on beauty and lifestyle products because of the large margins and potential for international scaling.

On 16 September 2020, THG floated on the London Stock Exchange, the largest IPO on the LSE since 2013. The share price rose in value by 25% on the first day of trading, generating £920m for the company and £961m for the company's owners. After the flotation, Moulding received one of the biggest payouts in UK corporate history of at least £830m in shares.

Initially the company's chairman and CEO, Moulding stepped down as chairman in March 2022 following criticism of the THG's governance arrangements.

== Personal life ==
Matthew Moulding is married to Jodie Moulding. They live in Northwich, Cheshire and have four children.

In 2015, Moulding signed a letter supporting the Conservative Party in the 2015 general election.

In October 2020, Moulding helped create The Moulding Foundation. In April 2021, he announced a donation of £100 million in THG shares to the Foundation.

As of May 2022, he has an estimated net worth of £700 million, down from £1.4 billion in 2021.
