= Ss John Fisher and Thomas More Roman Catholic High School =

Ss John Fisher and Thomas More RC High School

Location
- Gibfield Road; Colne; Lancashire, BB8 8JT; England; 53.84607°N 2.18877°W

Information
- Type: Voluntary aided school
- Religious affiliation: Roman Catholic
- Established: 1960
- Local authority: Lancashire
- Department for Education URN: 119785 Tables
- Ofsted: Reports
- Gender: Coeducational
- Age: 11 to 16
- Website: http://www.fishermore.lancs.sch.uk/

Ss John Fisher and Thomas More RC High School is a coeducational secondary school located in Colne in the English county of Lancashire. The school is named after the Roman Catholic Saints John Fisher and Thomas More. The headteacher from September 2002 to July 2007 was Mr Brendan Conboy, who moved to Our Lady's Catholic College.

== Description ==
Established in 1960, it is a voluntary aided school administered by Lancashire County Council and the Roman Catholic Diocese of Salford. The principal associated primary schools are Holy Saviour RC Primary School in Nelson, Holy Trinity RC Primary School in Brierfield, Sacred Heart RC Primary School in Colne, St John Southworth RC Primary School in Nelson and St Joseph's RC Primary School in Barnoldswick.

Ss John Fisher and Thomas More RC High School offers GCSEs and BTECs as programmes of study for pupils. The school also offers some vocational courses, in conjunction with local further education colleges.

== Notable former pupils ==
- Jessica Forrest, actress
- Natalie Haythornthwaite, netball player for England & NSW Swifts
- Hannah Hobley, actress
- Neil Hodgson, former motorcycle racer
- Matt Moulding (born 1972), businessman, founder of The Hut Group
