= CLHS =

CLHS may refer to:

== Schools ==
- California Lutheran Academy (formerly California Lutheran High School), Wildomar, California, United States
- Canyon Lake High School (Texas), Fischer, Texas, United States
- Cardinal Langley Roman Catholic High School, Middleton, Greater Manchester, England
- Center Line High School, Center Line, Michigan, United States
- Central Lafourche High School, Matthews, Louisiana, United States
- Central Lancaster High School, Lancaster, England
- Chung Ling High School, George Town, Panang, Malaysia
- Clear Lake High School (Clear Lake, Iowa), United States
- Clear Lake High School (Houston, Texas), United States
- Concordia Lutheran High School (Fort Wayne, Indiana), United States
- Concordia Lutheran High School (Texas), Tomball, Texas, United States
- County Line High School, Branch, Arkansas, United States
- Cold Lake High School, Cold Lake, Alberta, Canada
- Crean Lutheran High School, Irvine, California, United States
- Cypress Lake High School, Fort Myers, Florida, United States

== Other uses ==
- Common Lisp HyperSpec
