= Murder of Sophie Lancaster =

2007 murder case in the United Kingdom

- Location: 53.693333°N 2.203889°W; Bacup, Lancashire, England
- Date: 11 August 2007; 19 years ago 1:10 am – 1:20 am
- Attack type: Murder by beating
- Victim: Sophie Lancaster
- Perpetrators: Brendan Harris; Ryan Herbert
- Convictions: Murder, grievous bodily harm
- Sentence: Life imprisonment
- Judge: Anthony Russell QC

The murder of Sophie Lancaster occurred in England in August 2007. Lancaster and her boyfriend, Robert Maltby, were attacked by a group of teenage boys in Stubbylee Park in Bacup, Lancashire on 11 August 2007. As a result of the severe head injuries Lancaster sustained in the attack, she went into a coma from which she never regained consciousness. She died of her injuries thirteen days later. The police said the attack may have been linked to the couple wearing gothic fashion and being members of the goth subculture.

Five teenage boys were later arrested and charged with murder. Two of them, Ryan Herbert and Brendan Harris, were convicted of murder and sentenced to life imprisonment. The other three were convicted and jailed for grievous bodily harm against Maltby. A charity, The Sophie Lancaster Foundation, was established in Lancaster's name after her death. Numerous events have paid tribute to her locally, nationally and internationally. Plays, films, art and books have covered the issues surrounding the attack.

== Background ==
=== Sophie Lancaster ===
Sophie Lancaster
- Born: Sophie Louise Lancaster; 26 November 1986; Lancashire, England
- Died: 24 August 2007 (aged 20); Hope Hospital, Salford, England
- Cause of death: Beating
- Resting place: Whitworth Cemetery; 53.66716°N 2.16748°W
- Education: Haslingden High School
- Occupation: Student
- Height: 5 ft 2 in (157 cm)
- Partner: Robert Maltby
- Parent(s): Sylvia Lancaster; John Lancaster
- Relatives: Adam Lancaster (brother)

Sophie Louise Lancaster (born 26 November 1986) grew up in Haslingden and attended Stonefold Primary School and Haslingden High School. The youngest of two children, Lancaster was a vegetarian since the age of six, and a pacifist. She enjoyed reading, sometimes finishing an entire book in a day, and was a fan of the Harry Potter series. Sophie was in her early teens when she first started wearing gothic fashion and accessories. Her, mother, Sylvia, said: "I thought she looked beautiful and very cool. At just over 5ft and very petite, she’d always been such a quiet, shy girl, so I was pleased that she was learning to express herself. Her new look seemed to give her more confidence." At the time of her death, Sophie was on a gap year, working at HMV, and planned to attend Accrington and Rossendale College to do an English degree, hoping to become either a journalist or a youth worker.

Lancaster had been in a relationship with Robert Maltby, a 21-year-old art student from Bacup, for almost three years. Before moving in with Sophie, Robert lived with his parents, Tracy and David, and older brother, Christopher, and attended Bacup and Rawtenstall Grammar School. The couple first met in 2004, and at the time of the attack, they had been living together on King Street in Bacup for around six months. Like Sophie, Robert also had a long-standing attachment to the goth subculture. Both were fans of bands such as Korn, Slipknot and My Chemical Romance, and their favourite film was The Crow. Robert was working for the summer at J&J Ormerod, a local kitchen and bedroom-manufacturing firm, at the time of Sophie's death. The couple's families described them as "goths", and said: "They're both intelligent, sensitive kids. They're not the sort of people to get in trouble, but they have had problems in the past because they stand out."

=== Brendan Harris, Ryan Herbert, the Hulme brothers and Daniel Mallett ===
Brendan Desmond Harris and Ryan Stephen Herbert (born 3 December 1991) were aged 15 and 16 respectively at the time of the attack, while brothers Joseph and Daniel Hulme were aged 15 and 17, and Daniel Mallett was 17 at the time. Harris had attended Whitworth Community High School and The Valley Leadership Academy in Bacup. Herbert, who never knew his father, lived with his mother, Christine, and sister, and attended All Saints' Catholic High School in Rawtenstall. Both Harris and Herbert regularly smoked cannabis, and four months prior to the attack on Lancaster and Maltby, both boys had received a conviction for assaulting and stamping on a 16-year-old boy in Stubbylee Park. Joseph and Daniel Hulme lived in nearby Shawforth on a travellers' site, while Daniel Mallett lived with his mother, Tracy, in Bacup. During the trial, Mallett was described in court as the only defendant said to come from a 'good home'.

All five boys – Harris, Herbert, the Hulme brothers and Mallett – were thought to be members of a gang called the 'Bacup Terror Group'. The boys' Bebo pages – which were removed following the attack – featured yellow crime-scene tape in the background and listed their interests as 'GBH'. Before the attack, Herbert had posted a video on YouTube of himself dressed in a black hooded top, walking towards the camera brandishing a wooden stick, posing at local landmarks, and rapping with three other boys on a track titled "Where U From (Bacup)". The song and video were part of a youth project and contained the lyrics: "Enough men die in this town/You mess with GBH, you go down." It was removed from the website after Lancaster's murder.

== Attack ==
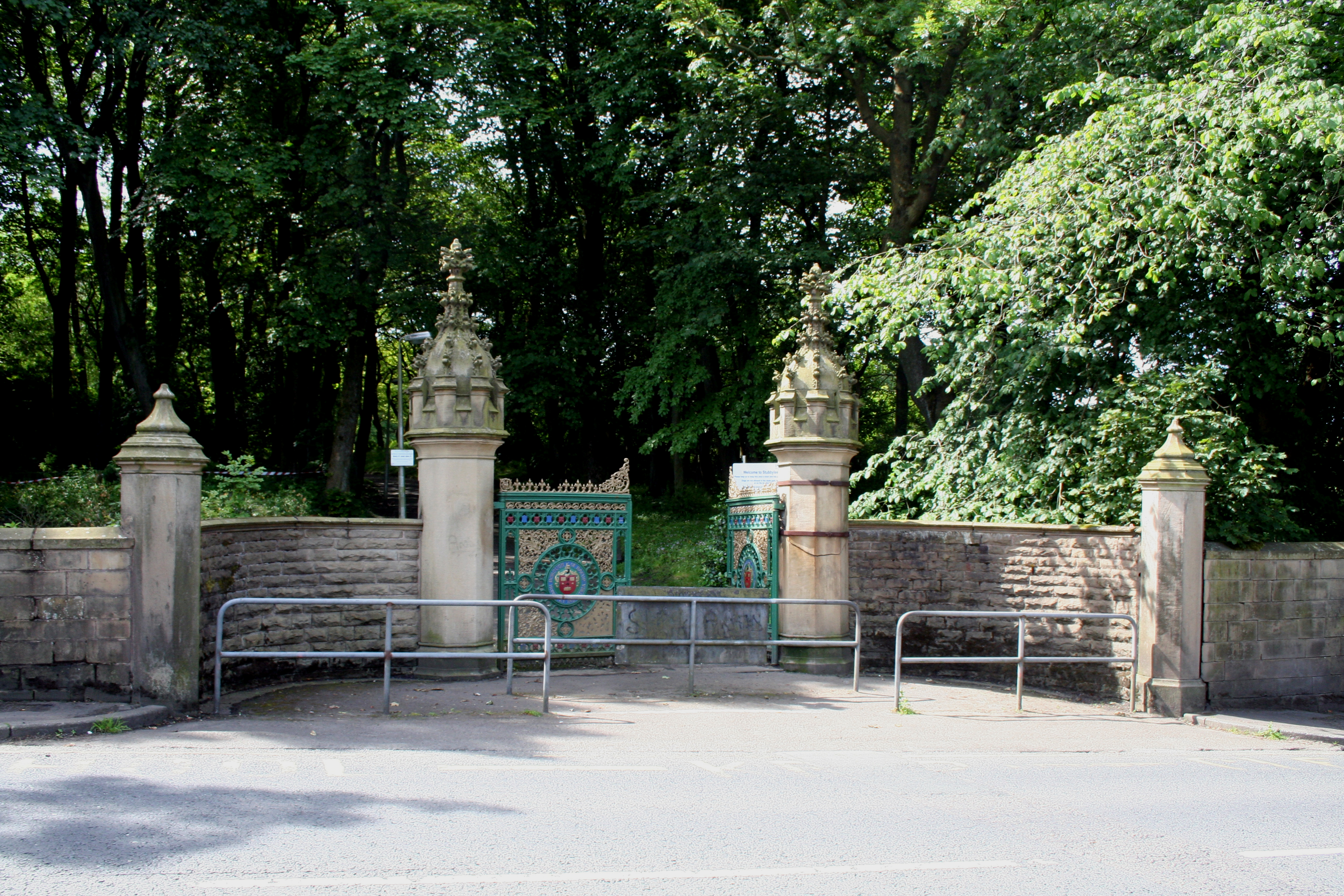
The gateway to Stubbylee Park in Bacup, where Lancaster and Maltby were attacked

On the evening of 10 August 2007, Lancaster and Maltby had been drinking and watching television at a friend's house in Britannia, a suburb of Bacup. They left to walk home at around 11:40pm. On their way home they stopped at a petrol station to buy cigarettes. On the petrol station forecourt a group of teenagers, including Brendan Harris, Ryan Herbert, Joseph Hulme, Daniel Hulme and Daniel Mallett struck up a friendly conversation with them. Lancaster and Maltby decided to join the group of teenagers at an area of Bacup known as the Fudge Factory before they all went to the skate park area of Stubbylee Park. In the park, Lancaster and Maltby were subjected to a vicious mob attack without provocation from Harris, Herbert, Joseph Hulme, Daniel Hulme, and Mallett between 1:10 and 1:20am on 11 August 2007.

All five teenagers beat Maltby to the point of unconsciousness. As he lay on the ground, Lancaster cradled his head in her lap and shouted for help and for the attackers to leave him alone. Brendan Harris and Ryan Herbert then beat Lancaster to the point of unconsciousness and repeatedly kicked and stomped on her head. A 15-year-old witness told police: "They were running over and just kicking her in the head and jumping up and down on her head." One witness used a mobile phone to call for emergency services saying: "We need... we need an ambulance at Bacup Park; this mosher has just been banged because he's a mosher." The Guardian reported that afterwards, "The killers celebrated their attack on the goths – or 'moshers' – by telling friends afterwards that they had 'done summat [something] good', and claiming: 'There's two moshers nearly dead up Bacup park – you wanna see them – they're a right mess.'"

Police said that it was "a sustained attack during the course of which the pair received serious head injuries and their faces were so swollen we could not ascertain which one was female and which one was male". Both were hospitalised as a result of the attack, initially at Rochdale Infirmary. Maltby's injuries left him in a coma and with internal bleeding. He gradually recovered, but had lost memory of the time leading up to and during the attack. Lancaster, in a deep coma, was placed on life support and moved to Fairfield General Hospital in Bury, then to the neurology unit at Hope Hospital (now Salford Royal Hospital) in Salford. During Sophie's time in hospital, her mother, Sylvia, gently waxed her dreadlocks, washed her, and read the Harry Potter books to her in an attempt to wake her up from her coma, before the family made the difficult decision to switch off her life support. The hospital staff determined that she would never regain consciousness, and on 24 August 2007, her life support was terminated.

== Arrests and investigation ==
Mug shots of Brendan Harris and Ryan Herbert taken on 11 August 2007

Lancashire Police arrested five individuals in connection with the attack, but conducted extensive further investigations, as it appeared that up to fifteen people were in the area and may have witnessed or participated in the assault. The police identified the gothic dress of the couple as a possible motivation for the attack. Brendan Harris and Ryan Herbert were remanded in custody, while Joseph Hulme, Daniel Hulme and Daniel Mallett were released on bail. Harris had to be told by the police how serious the incident was, as he was laughing and joking with his mother during his initial police interview. All five boys were charged with causing grievous bodily harm with intent, but following Lancaster's death the Crown Prosecution Service charged all five with Lancaster's murder.

By 5 October 2007, after questioning more than 100 people, the police concluded that they were not expecting to make any more arrests in the case, and although 15–20 people were in the park at some point during the night of the attack, they believed that many were not directly involved, as the area was a regular night time hangout spot for teenagers.

Local residents identified the park as a spot often used by "drunken, violent yobs" guilty of vandalism and under-age drinking. They had asked for measures to be taken about the area before the tragedy occurred. Following the murder, residents called for improved security in the area, but Rossendale Borough Council said park rangers would be too expensive.

== Trial and verdict ==
Mug shots of Joseph Hulme, Danny Hulme and Daniel Mallett

On 6 September 2007, the five suspects were charged with murder at Burnley Youth Court. Three were released on bail: two boys aged 15 and 17 from Shawforth, and a 17-year-old boy from Bacup. On 18 October at Burnley Youth Court, all five were summoned to appear at Preston Crown Court. A preliminary hearing was held on 31 October 2007, where all five were charged with the murder of Lancaster and grievous bodily harm with intent for the assault on Maltby. A further plea and case management hearing was ordered by Judge Anthony Russell QC for 14 December. The judge also indicated a provisional trial date, on both allegations, of 10 March 2008. At the hearing on 14 December 2007, the five accused pleaded not guilty on both charges.

At the beginning of the trial on 10 March 2008, all five boys pleaded guilty to the charge of grievous bodily harm with intent, Ryan Herbert pleaded guilty to murder, Brendan Harris pleaded not guilty to murder, while the murder charges against the other three were dropped. Lancaster's mother complained to the police that the parents of the Hulmes and Daniel Mallett were sniggering at her outside the court before the trial began. As the trial opened the prosecution told the hearing: "Sophie and Robert were singled out not for anything they had said or done, but because they looked and dressed differently." The jury heard extensive descriptions of the severity of the attack from a number of witnesses and through a recorded phone conversation taken at the time.

At the conclusion of the trial on 27 March 2008, Brendan Harris was found guilty of murder, and the judge allowed the names of both Harris and Herbert, which had been withheld during the trial, to be made public. Detective Superintendent Mick Gradwell of Lancashire Police said it was one of the most violent murders he had come across in his career: "I do not think Herbert and Harris have recognised how violent the attack was. They have just done it without thinking, but they seemed to have enjoyed it, and carried on remorselessly kicking at two very defenceless people who were unable to protect themselves because of the level of violence inflicted upon them. [...] I am very critical of some of the parents involved. I really don't think they have taken completely seriously how repulsive this incident was." He said that when Harris was initially interviewed about the assaults he was "laughing and joking" with his mother.

Sentencing in the case was set for 28 April 2008. Both Harris and Herbert were sentenced to life imprisonment with the trial judge recommending that Harris should serve at least 18 years and Herbert at least 16 years and three months. In his closing remarks the judge described the attack as "feral thuggery" which raised questions about the "sort of society which exists in this country". He added: "This was a terrible case which has shocked and outraged all who have heard about it. At least wild animals, when they hunt in packs, have a legitimate reason for so doing, to obtain food. You have none and your behaviour on that night degrades humanity itself." The three other defendants were also sentenced for their role in the attack. Brothers Joseph and Daniel Hulme, and Daniel Mallett, who had all earlier pleaded guilty to grievous bodily harm with intent on Maltby, were jailed. Mallett was sentenced to four years and four months, and the Hulme brothers for five years and ten months each.

== Subsequent legal developments ==
On 13 June 2008, it was reported that all the defendants were appealing against the sentences for their convictions. The appeal was heard on 7 October 2008 with an announcement that the result would be released at a later date. On 29 October, it was announced that Ryan Herbert would have his minimum term reduced from 16 years and three months to 15 years and six months. This was a reduction of nine months after the appeal judges ruled that not enough allowance had been made for his guilty plea during the initial trial. Brendan Harris and the three other defendants had their appeals dismissed.

In January 2013, Harris threatened to kill and then assaulted a psychiatric nurse at the secure hospital he was being held in. Harris, who had since been diagnosed with schizophrenia, started to have paranoid auditory and visual hallucinations around this time. He was sentenced to a further four months in prison.

In August 2016, Ryan Herbert applied to the Court of Appeal in an attempt to further reduce his sentence. The court heard evidence that Herbert had been involved in at least 15 disciplinary incidents, including multiple fights, during his first five years in prison. The most serious of these involved punching another inmate and kicking him in the head before attacking a member of prison staff. His appeal was dismissed.

In February 2020, Herbert had his minimum sentence cut to 14.5 years, as a High Court judge concluded he had made "exceptional progress" in prison. In August 2020 it was decided that Herbert could be transferred to an open prison. Ryan Herbert was released from prison on licence in March 2022.

Brendan Harris, who maintains that he is innocent, became eligible for parole in November 2025. David Lammy, who was at the time the Secretary of State for Justice, attempted to block his release. Brendan Harris was released from prison on licence in May 2026.

== Political reaction ==
The murder of Sophie Lancaster and the attack on Robert Maltby has received much discussion and expressions of sympathy, not just amongst the UK goth subculture, but among other subcultures, and overseas as well. Martin Coles, who organised the Whitby bench fund, said, "Since starting the online campaign to raise awareness of the collection, I've been contacted by people from all over the world that have been shocked by this, and not just those from the gothic community, I've been talking to goths, bikers, metallers, people from the electro and indie scenes, just about any 'alternative' genre."

The attack has also led to wider discussions on whether what happened to Sophie and Robert should be classified as a hate crime, and has been compared to the murder of the punk Brian Deneke in the United States. It has been widely perceived by goths as a more extreme example of the social intolerance, violence and abuse people can suffer as a result of their attachment to the goth subculture.

The Observer said on 17 February 2008 that the case was one of a "rash of violent attacks targeting punk, goth and metal kids [...] Sophie Lancaster's case has become a rallying cry for those in the goth scene worried about this upsurge of violence." This discussion of the case led to an online petition to then Prime Minister Gordon Brown to "widen the definition of 'Hate Crime', to include crimes committed against a person or persons, on the basis of their appearance or subcultural interests" on the 10 Downing Street website.

Ade Varney, creator of the petition, said that goths "get verbal assaults every day, and not just from young people. But now younger teenagers have the mentality of hardened criminals, and I definitely sense this violent aspect getting worse. [...] Sophie's death has made people think, and I have heard of teenagers, especially girls, modifying the way they dress when they walk through certain areas." This led to political developments: the Manchester Evening News reported that Rossendale and Darwen MP Janet Anderson and Hyndburn MP Greg Pope "are set to request a debate in the Commons to call for the widening of the law to include such an attack under the definition of a hate crime as soon as possible". The paper reported that they would be "putting forward an early day motion calling on the government to give the matter 'urgent consideration'."

In May 2009, the then Justice Minister, Jack Straw, said that while he could not change the law, he could amend the sentencing guidelines to require judges to treat an attack on a member of a subculture as an aggravating factor, similar to a racially motivated or homophobic assault, when sentencing perpetrators.

In April 2013, Greater Manchester Police announced they would officially begin to record offences committed against goths and other alternative groups as hate crimes, as they do with offences specifically aimed at someone's race, disability or sexual orientation.

== Media reaction ==
The attack was discussed in the media in connection with a wave of youth gang-related violence in the UK over the summer of 2007, including the murder of Liverpool schoolboy Rhys Jones. Then Conservative leader David Cameron mentioned the attack as an example in a "speech criticising youth crime and Britain's 'real and growing' problem with violence". In February 2008, The Observer compared the limited amount of coverage the Lancaster case received to the large amount of coverage worldwide which the media paid to the case of discrimination faced by a Yorkshire goth couple who were thrown off a bus: "That the story received just a fraction of the coverage garned [sic] by the dog-lead goths tells you something about society. The British eccentric has become the circus freak." However, the trial in March 2008 saw extensive coverage in national media. On 13 March 2008, Bizarre magazine launched a "Proud to be Different" campaign in honour of Lancaster.

Rod Liddle of The Sunday Times observed after the murder that the victims of the attack had paid the price for the indulgence of the "feral" criminals who perpetrated it "by their parents, by the courts, by the council, by a government which wants to send fewer such people to prison."

There are a large number of Facebook groups dedicated to Lancaster. With the exception of the "Sophie Lancaster Foundation" group, none of these are official, and nearly all focus on the tragedy of her death.

On 26 November 2009, which would have been Lancaster's 23rd birthday, a four-minute animated short film named Dark Angel, based on the murder, was released onto the internet and broadcast on MTV. The film was also projected onto a screen in the Cathedral Gardens in Manchester.

In July 2010, the book Weirdo Mosher Freak by journalist Catherine Smyth was published about the murder.

On 11 March 2011, BBC Radio 4 broadcast the play Black Roses: The Killing of Sophie Lancaster, consisting of poems by poet, playwright, musician and novelist Simon Armitage telling the story of Lancaster's life, combined with the personal recollections of her mother. The role of Lancaster was played by Rachel Austin. On 11 October 2015, BBC Four broadcast Black Roses : The Killing of Sophie Lancaster, a 45-minute tribute. Her story was told through a sequence of poems by Armitage. Lancaster's mother – Sylvia Lancaster – was played by actress Julie Hesmondhalgh. She spoke the words of Sylvia Lancaster about the life and death of Sophie (who was played by Austin reprising her role) throughout the programme.

In June 2017, Robert Maltby gave his first full-length interview on the tenth anniversary of Sophie's murder. Maltby revealed that his brain had fully recovered following the attack and he had returned to his art studies but had struggled with depression and could not bring himself to immediately visit Sophie's grave. He explained that beyond working with the producers of Murdered for Being Different he had been reluctant to talk about the events due to what he saw as the "patronising" way the crime has been depicted and that he would rather be remembered for his career in art rather than association with the murder. He also stated that he did not view Sophie's death as a hate crime and described the media's focus on the goth angle as an "oversimplification of a much broader social issue" and "victim blaming". Maltby also revealed that he was no longer interested in the goth subculture, had since entered into a new relationship, and planned to move abroad to further his artistic ambitions.

On 18 June 2017, BBC Three released a film based on the events surrounding Lancaster's death, Murdered for Being Different. In 2021, it was announced that Lancaster's murder was to inspire a new storyline on Coronation Street, centred around hate crime. Character Nina Lucas (Mollie Gallagher) was attacked for her gothic appearance, as was her boyfriend Seb Franklin (Harry Visinoni) who ended up dying in hospital.

== Sophie Lancaster Foundation ==
The logo of the Sophie Lancaster Foundation

The Sophie Lancaster Foundation was founded on 20 October 2008 and became a registered charity on 18 May 2009. It is based in Haslingden. Amongst its founding members were Lancaster's parents, Sylvia and John Lancaster. Sophie's older brother, Adam Lancaster, works as a volunteer for the foundation.

The foundation has three objectives. The first is to commemorate Lancaster's life. The second is to challenge intolerance against the alternative community through education. The third is to campaign for a change in the law to class violence against members of the alternative community as hate crimes. It does this by engaging with educational institutions, music festivals, prisons, the police and social services.

Its patrons include comedian, actor and writer Robin Ince, actress, director and producer Juliet Landau, and TV presenter and actress Vicky McClure, as well as Simon Armitage. Actress Julie Hesmondhalgh, who played Sylvia Lancaster in the BBC screen adaptation of Black Roses, is a former patron.

On 3 June 2010, Robert Maltby put on an exhibition of his own art, Crimson Iris: The Art of Sophie, at Affleck's Palace in Manchester, featuring 15 paintings inspired by Lancaster. The money raised from the exhibition went to the Sophie Lancaster Foundation.

On 14 June 2014, it was announced that Sylvia Lancaster was to receive an OBE in recognition of her campaign to promote a more tolerant society.

In 2017, the foundation was awarded a £50,000 grant from the British Government to combat hate crime.

On 12 April 2022, Sylvia Lancaster, Sophie's mother, died suddenly and unexpectedly after a short illness. In a statement, the foundation said, “She worked tirelessly to combat the inaccurate and lazy stereotyping that all too often leads to violent prejudice and promoted a culture of celebrating difference; something that leads to safer communities for us all.”

On 12 May 2022, Sylvia Lancaster's funeral was held in Whitworth, with attendees wearing pink armbands to honour her love of the colour. Julie Hesmondhalgh attended the funeral to pay her respects, describing Lancaster as "fierce, smart and uncompromising", an "eclectic lover of music", and someone who "loved and valued the company of young people, especially the outsiders, the alternatives." She was laid to rest alongside her daughter at Whitworth Cemetery.

In October 2024, it was announced that Judge Anthony Russell QC, who had presided over the trial of the five teenagers that attacked Lancaster and Maltby, had left £5,000 to the Sophie Lancaster Foundation in his will.

== Tributes to Lancaster ==
The park where the attack occurred was flooded with floral tributes to the couple soon after the attack, and online message boards have seen many tributes to Lancaster from well-wishers, including some from as far afield as Continental Europe and North America, including a special Facebook and a Bebo group in her honour.

The attack was widely condemned in Lancashire and Rossendale by Council leaders and the local community. At the alternative electronic music festival Infest in Bradford on 26 August 2007, two days after Lancaster's death, Ronan Harris of VNV Nation dedicated the song "Illusion" to her and contacted the family to offer his condolences. There have also been discussions of a plaque in her memory at the park. A song was dedicated to Lancaster in concerts at Bacup's Royal Court Theatre on 6/7 September 2007, and a collection taken. A twelve-hour-long concert in her honour was held on 6 October 2007, in the grounds of Bacup Borough F.C., featuring ten bands. The club played a game during the concert with all the takings going to the memorial fund; this included a song written in Lancaster's honour.

Lancaster's family and friends set up a website in her memory and have decided to use the contributions from well-wishers and these events to set up a special fund to be known as "S.O.P.H.I.E". Standing for "Stamp Out Prejudice Hatred and Intolerance Everywhere", it aims to "provide an appropriate memorial; a lasting legacy to raise awareness of the injustice perpetrated against Sophie Lancaster and to work towards a more tolerant, less violent society". Lancaster's mother, Sylvia, said: "it will also help fund group sessions with young people to teach them about alternative cultures and to respect everyone". A special black ribbon was being sold to support the fund available at the many events being held across Rossendale and in local shops. Lancaster's memory was further honoured at the Eccentrik Festival in North Carolina, and it was said that "three more concerts are planned in California, one in Iowa and one in Brisbane, Australia".

A number of gothic gigs and club nights across the UK and Ireland dedicated a night to Lancaster in October and November 2007, including the Whitby Gothic Weekend. A collection was raised from these events to place a memorial bench to her in Whitby. The bench was put in place on Whitby's West Cliff in January 2008.

The "Sophie Award" has been established as an ongoing prize for innovative and experimental film-making at Bacup Film Festival. Lancaster's public funeral was organised for 12 November 2007, and attended by hundreds of people, including BBC film crews. On 25 November 2007, Lancaster's friends held a memorial concert to "commemorate Sophie's uniqueness", featuring her favourite local bands, the night before what would have been Lancaster's 21st birthday, at St Mary's Chambers, Rawtenstall; the concert was covered by Granada Television. A repeat event was planned for 26 November 2008, headlined by The Damned and AOR featuring Dave Sharp, founder member of The Alarm.

On 13 January 2009, it was announced that the Bloodstock Open Air festival were to rename their second stage The Sophie Lancaster Stage in tribute, and to promote the Sophie Lancaster Foundation. The second stage has carried the name each year since.

From 24–25 June 2008, Carabas Theatre Company performed a new dark comedy that dealt with perceptions of the Gothic subculture, donating all profits to the S.O.P.H.I.E fund. The work was performed at the Gregson Centre, Moor Gate, Lancaster. In a discussion after the performance, the cast and audience discussed Goth culture, the issues raised in the performance, and the possibility of educating young people about different subcultures to foster unity and acceptance from a young age. The work, "Suckers", was written and directed by M. J. Wesolowski, and the production raised money for the S.O.P.H.I.E fund.

The 2012 Delain album and single We Are the Others is dedicated to Sophie's memory. Delain played at Bloodstock open air and chose to play at the Sophie Lancaster stage on 7 August 2015.

On 28 July 2012, Punk Poet Andy T (Andy Thurlow) released a song, "Sophie Lancaster", on the "Life at Tether's End" LP; he normally performs this song at live shows.

In 2022, the heavy metal band Lamb of God dedicated their song "Redneck" at Bloodstock Open Air, as a tribute to both Sophie and Sylvia Lancaster.

== See also ==
- 2007 in England
- Death of Brian Deneke
- Suicide of Nicola Ann Raphael
