= Steven Croft (cricketer) =

English cricketer (born 1984)

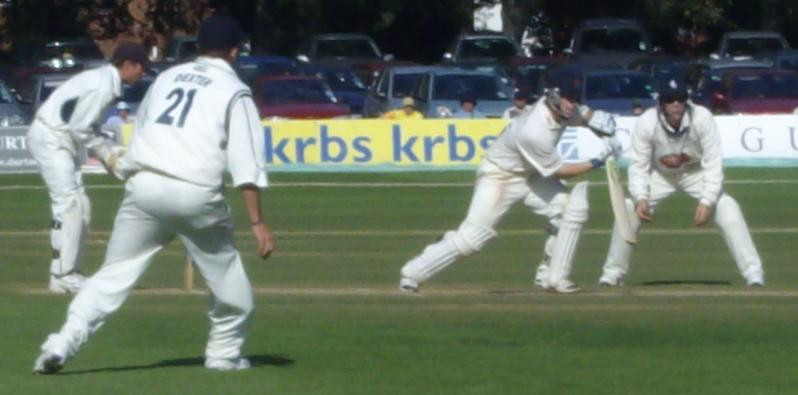

Personal information
- Full name: Steven John Croft
- Born: 11 October 1984 (age 42); Blackpool, Lancashire, England
- Nickname: Crofty
- Height: 5 ft 11 in (1.80 m)
- Batting: Right-handed
- Bowling: Right-arm off break
- Role: All rounder, occasional wicket-keeper

Domestic team information
- Years: Team
- 2002: Lancashire Cricket Board
- 2005–2024: Lancashire (squad no. 15)
- 2008/09: Auckland
- 2012/13: Northern Districts
- FC debut: 25 May 2005 Lancashire v Oxford UCCE
- LA debut: 29 August 2002 Lancashire CB v Oxfordshire

Career statistics
Competition	FC	LA	T20
Matches	212	175	250
Runs scored	9,857	4,858	5,486
Batting average	34.10	38.25	30.82
100s/50s	16/56	4/34	1/30
Top score	156	127	101
Balls bowled	5,609	2,985	1,804
Wickets	72	66	79
Bowling average	42.91	41.87	28.36
5 wickets in innings	1	0	0
10 wickets in match	0	0	0
Best bowling	6/41	4/24	3/6
Catches/stumpings	202/0	90/–	142/–
- Source: Cricinfo, 25 September 2024

Steven John Croft (born 11 October 1984) is an English former first-class cricketer who played for Lancashire County Cricket Club from 2005 until 2024. He bats right-handed and can bowl both medium-fast and off breaks. In 2008 Croft was given the Lancashire members' Player of the Year and One-Day Player of the Year awards. In 2008–09 he played for the Auckland Aces in New Zealand as an overseas player. Awarded his Lancashire cap in 2010, Croft was part of the Lancashire team that won the County Championship in 2011.

== Career ==
Born in Blackpool, Lancashire, Croft made his debut for the Lancashire Second XI at the age of 16, in May 2001. He made his first-class Lancashire debut in 2005, having previously made his list A debut for the Lancashire Cricket Board in 2002. He spent the winters of 2005–06 and 2006–07 playing club cricket in Australia.

Croft finished the 2008 season with 585 first-class runs in thirteen matches, with an average of 32.50. He hit one century, his maiden hundred a 122 against Nottinghamshire and three fifties. In one-day matches, he hit 279 runs from thirteen matches, averaging 31. He was also the club's leading wicket-taker with fourteen, at an average of 21.71. In Twenty20 matches he hit 134 runs from eleven matches and took six wickets. He also won the Player of the Month award for August. In September 2008 Croft won two awards for the 2008 season winning the club's members Player of the Year award and the one-day Player of the Year award. At the start of August 2010, Croft was awarded his county cap.

Croft signed a contract to become the overseas player at Auckland Aces, one of six first-class teams clubs in New Zealand for the State championship for the 2008–09 season. In eight first-class matches, he scored 330 runs, including two half-centuries, and averaged 36.66. Croft also played ten list A matches, amassing 209 runs with a single score above 50.

Croft on his way to 65 not out against Durham in the 2012 FL T20

During a drawn County Championship match against Warwickshire in August 2011, Croft scored the second century of his first-class career, and his first in three years. He passed 3,000 first-class runs in the innings of 122 from 182 balls, which equalled his highest score. Though there was a three-year gap between his first and second centuries, in the next County Championship match Croft scored a third, this time an innings of 107 in a Lancashire victory over Worcestershire. On 15 September 2011, Croft scored the winning runs as Lancashire beat Somerset at Taunton to clinch the County Championship outright for the first time since 1934. Croft played in all 16 Championship matches and finished with 825 runs at an average of 31.73, making him the club's fourth highest run-scorer (only two Lancashire batsmen managed over- 1,000 runs in the 2011 season).

Lancashire began their title defence poorly, with three losses from their first four County Championship matches. The batsmen struggled in particular, and it was not until the third County Championship match that one of them scored a century. Against a Somerset bowling attack depleted through injury, Croft scored his fourth first-class century.

In June 2021, in the 2021 t20 Blast, Croft played in his 200th T20 match.

He made his maiden T20 100 in June 2023, scoring 101 in a win against Northants.

He retired from first-class and 50 over cricket in December 2023, signing a T20 contract only, as well as joining the county's coaching staff. In September 2024, announced his retirement from professional cricket at the age of 39 to move into Lancashire's coaching staff on a full-time basis.

== Personal life ==
Croft was educated at Highfield Humanities College in his hometown of Blackpool and Myerscough College in Bilsborrow on the Fylde. He has twice been the half-time guest at the club's home games at Bloomfield Road, firstly against Derby County on 21 October 2008. and again on 30 November 2009 during the West Lancashire derby against Preston North End.
