= Lee Quarry =

Mountain bike trail in Lancashire, England

Coordinates: 53.6854°N 2.2072°W

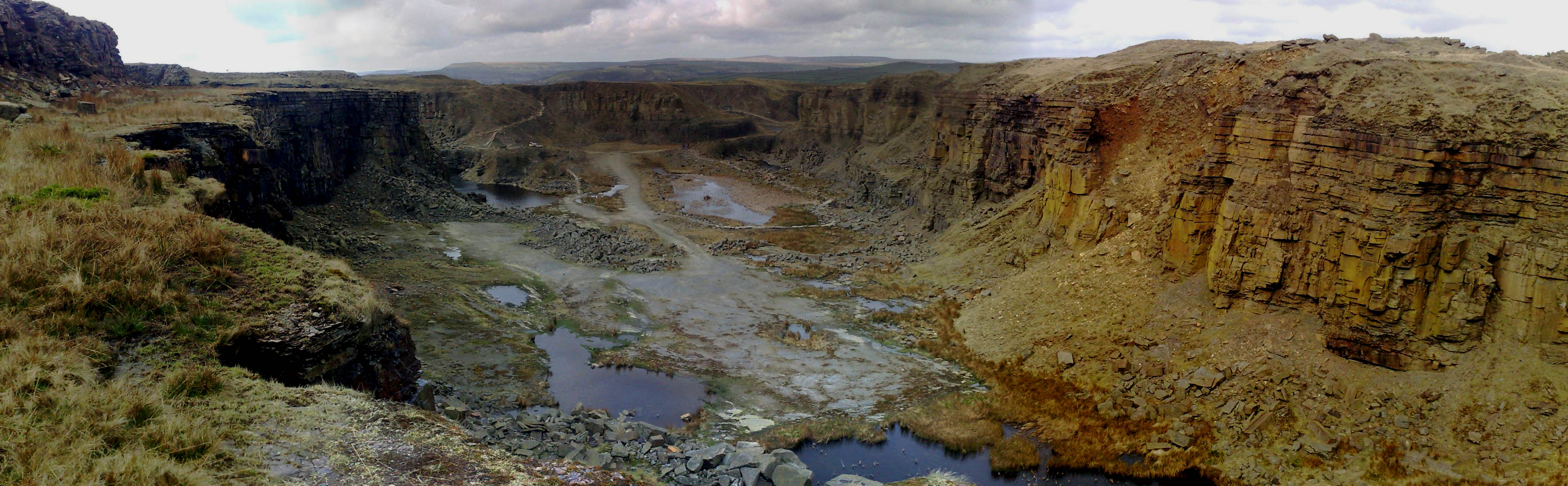
Lee Quarry

Lee Quarry is a mountain bike trail located near Bacup and Stacksteads in Rossendale Valley, Lancashire. Originally a working quarry, the quarry alongside its neighbour Cragg Quarry have been transformed. The trail was set up by Lancashire County Council and is free to use.

== Routes ==
There are two main routes around the quarry known as the 'Red' and 'Black' routes, which are for less and more experienced cyclists respectively. The red route is around 7 kilometres (4.3 mi) long and the black route is 1 kilometre (0.62 mi). The 'Pump Tracks' are generally used as a practice loop before attempting the main routes. Nearby Cragg Quarry is reached by a newly constructed bridleway link over Brandwood Lower end moor.
