= Tauheedul Islam Girls' High School =

Tauheedul Islam Girls' High School and Sixth Form College (TIGHS)

Location
- Preston New Road; Blackburn, Lancashire, BB2 7AD; England; 53.7537°N 2.4855°W

Information
- School type: Faith academy, government-funded, comprehensive academy
- Religious affiliation: Islam
- Established: 1984
- Local authority: Blackburn with Darwen
- Trust: Star Academies
- Department for Education URN: 141565 Tables
- Ofsted: Reports
- Governing Body Chair: Sir Mufti Hamid Patel
- Principal: Shahnaz Akhtar
- Gender: Girls
- Age: 11 to 19
- Enrolment: 777 as of February 2016
- Capacity: 800
- Language: English
- Hours in school day: Monday-Thursday: 8am-3pm Friday: 8am-12:30pm
- Associate Assistant Principal: s Afira Mulla
- Website: http://www.tighs.com/

Tauheedul Islam Girls' High School and Sixth Form College (TIGHS) is a secondary school for girls in Beardwood, Blackburn, England. It was founded by the charitable trust Tauheedul Islam Faith, Education and Community Trust (now known as Star Academies). It serves as the flagship school of the trust.

== History ==
The school opened as an independent school in September 1984 with six teachers and 96 students. The school stated that its first building was "very old" at the time.

In 2005, the school became the first Muslim state school in the North West. It had previously been an independent school. The school has been a success in school league tables, with 82% of pupils gaining five or more GCSEs at grade C or above in 2007, compared to the national average of 46.7%.

In September 2013 the school moved to a new campus in the Beardwood area.

In December 2014 the school converted to academy status.

== Student dress and personal behaviour ==
As of September 2013 10% of the school's sixth form students wear niqabs. In the same month, the Sunday Times published a headline stating that girls were forced to wear hijabs outside of school. In response, Mufti Hamid Patel, the principal, said that "It is totally incorrect to say that pupils are 'forced' to wear hijab outside of school."

On 17 August 2014, the Sunday Times published an article describing a 'remarkable transformation at the Tauheedul Islam Girls School' and listed a number of changes the school had made. These included stricter vetting policies for external speakers, girls no longer being required to wear hijabs, and inviting a range of speakers from all faiths to address its pupils.

== Awards and nominations ==
In January 2014, the school was nominated for the Services to Education award at the British Muslim Awards.

== Ofsted reports ==
- 2006 - Good
- 2010 - Outstanding
- 2012 - Outstanding
- 2014 - Outstanding
- 2022 - Outstanding

== GCSE results ==
In 2023, 94% of students achieved a "strong pass" in GCSE English and Maths, 97% of students achieved a standard pass, and the average grade in the English Baccalaureate subjects was 7.4.

In 2024, 90% of students achieved a "strong pass" in GCSE Maths and English, and 94% achieved a "standard pass". The average grade in English Baccalaureate subjects was 7.0.
