= Springs Boys' High School =

- Springs Boys High School crest

Location
- Federal Road; Springs, Gauteng 1559; South Africa
- Coordinates: 26.2981°S 28.4425°E

Information
- Type: Section 5 Public School
- Motto: ESTO PERPETUA ("May It Live Forever")
- Religious affiliation: Christianity
- Established: 1940; 86 years ago
- Sister school: Springs Girls' High School
- School board: National Senior Certificate
- School district: District 9
- Principal: Diane Freeman
- Grades: 8–12
- Gender: Male
- Age: 13 to 18
- Enrollment: 800 boys
- Language: English
- Schedule: 07:35 - 14:15
- Hours in school day: 7h20 min
- Campus: Urban Campus
- Campus type: Suburban
- Houses: Cassel; Struben; Selection; Selcourt
- Colors: Gold; Green; White
- Song: [Springs Boys'High School School Song]
- Sports: Rugby, Soccer, Tennis, Cricket, Water Polo, Swimming, Hockey, Athletics, Chess, Squash
- Rivals: Christian Brothers' College
- Accreditation: Gauteng Department of Education
- Alumni: Old Boys
- Website: www.sbhs.co.za

Springs Boys' High School is a high school in Springs, Gauteng, South Africa.

== Principals ==
- Claude Mullan (1940–1960)
- Harold Marston (1961–1975)
- Jaap Liebenberg (1975–1981)
- Bob Gouldie (1982–1993)
- André French (1994–2016)
- Diane Freeman (July 2017–present)

== Extramural Activities ==
Summer	Winter	Both
Swimming	Athletics	Chess
Water-polo	Cross-Country	Choir
Cricket	Hockey	Debating
Rugby	Soccer	First Aid
Squash		Brass Band
Tennis		Performing Arts
		Public Speaking

== Coat of arms ==
The badge, designed in 1940, has three sub-divisions in it. The first division is the Southern Cross. The second division is taken from the municipal coat-of-arms, symbolizing water and gold. The third is the lamp of knowledge, which symbolizes the striving for continuous academic excellence.

== Notable alumni ==
- Rudi Bryson - Cricket (Easterns, Northern Transvaal, Northerns, South Africa, Surrey)
- Dave Charlton - Racing Driver (Formula One Grand Prix)
- Bobby Cole (golfer)
- Junior Dala - Cricket (Easterns, The Unlimited Titans, South Africa A)
- DJ Cleo - DJ (Kwaito & House Producer), Will of Steel Productions
- Ben Filmalter - Mugg & Bean founder
- Dean Hall (rugby union)
- Vincent Moore - Cricket (Easterns, Titans, u/21 South Africa)
