= Whitworth Community High School =

School in Lancashire, England

Location
- Lancashire, OL12 8TS; England; 53°39′24″N 2°10′54″W

Information
- Type: Community school
- Motto: Climbing Higher
- Local authority: Lancashire County Council
- Department for Education URN: 119753 Tables
- Ofsted: Reports
- Headteacher: A Oliver
- Gender: Coeducational
- Age: 11 to 16
- Enrolment: 654
- Capacity: 709 students
- Website: http://www.wchs.co

Whitworth Community High School is a secondary school in the village of Whitworth, Rossendale, Lancashire. It is currently designated as "Good" by Ofsted in all categories.

== School ethos ==
Whitworth Community High School is a smaller high school with around 630 students on role. In their 2014 inspection report the Ofsted team found, "‘This is a school that values individuals, recognising that everyone is different but equal"

== Academic achievement ==
In 2017 73% of students achieved the new headline measure of at least the new GCSE grade 4 in both English and Maths, making Whitworth Community High School the most improved school in Lancashire on this measure.

== Inspection results ==
Whitworth Community High School is designated as ‘Good’ in all categories by Ofsted, following an inspection in December 2014.

Safeguarding was described as ‘exemplary’ by an Ofsted HMI team in December 2015.

== School leadership and staffing ==
Since 2024/25, the head of Whitworth Community High School has been A Oliver.

The senior leadership team comprises the head, 2 deputies, 2 assistant heads, 1 associate assistant head and 2 School Business Managers.

== Notable former pupils ==
- Brendan Harris, murderer
