= Moor Park High School =

Moor Park High School and Sixth Form
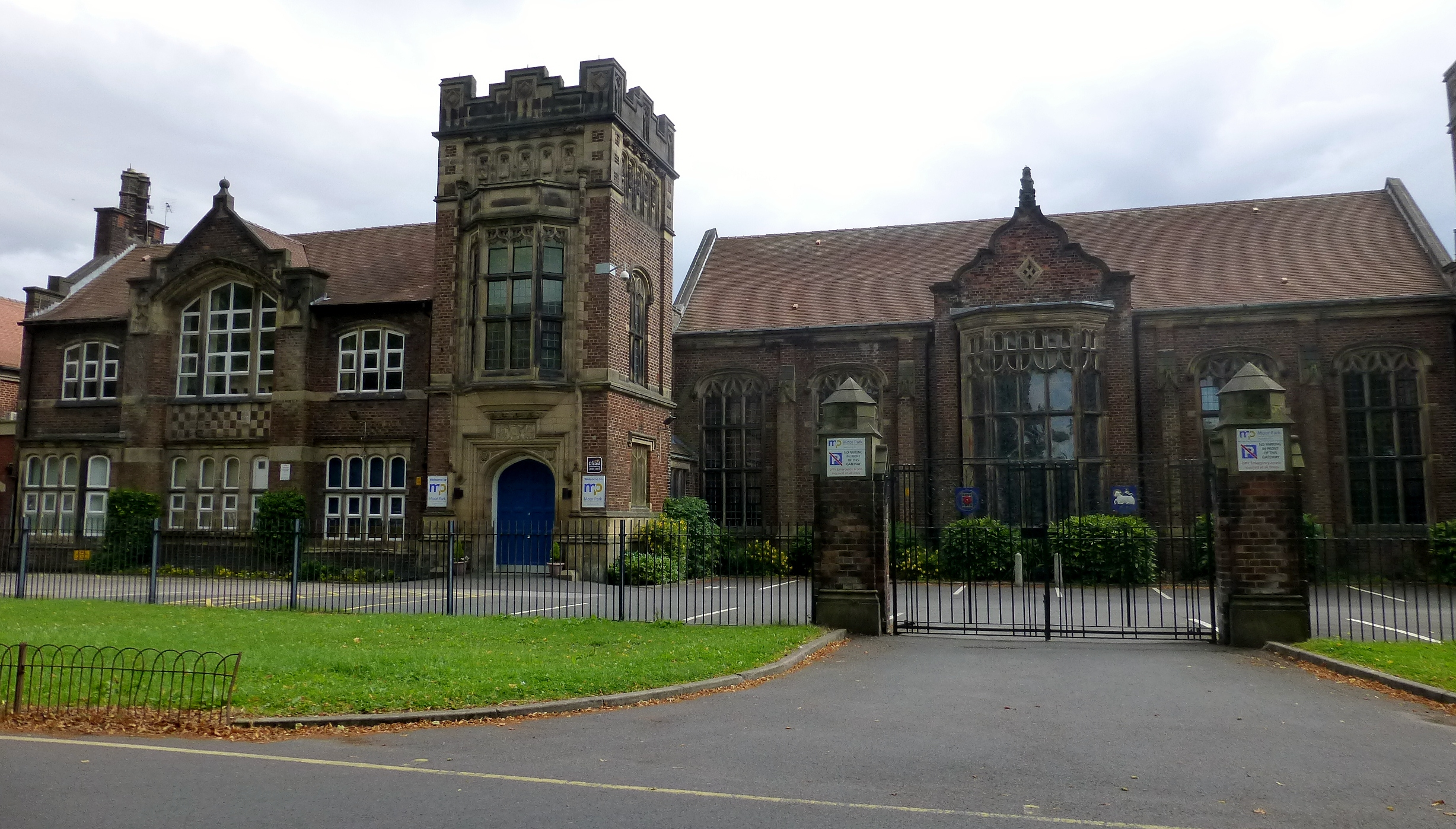
- School buildings (2013)

Location
- Moor Park Avenue; Preston, Lancashire, PR1 6DT; England
- Coordinates: 53.77097°N 2.69177°W

Information
- Type: Foundation school
- Local authority: Lancashire
- Department for Education URN: 119773 Tables
- Ofsted: Reports
- Staff: 84
- Gender: Coeducational
- Age: 11 to 18
- Enrolment: 621 as of January 2023
- Website: http://www.moorpark.mp/

———

Moor Park High School is a coeducational secondary school and sixth form located in Preston in the English county of Lancashire.

It is a foundation school administered by Lancashire County Council. The school was also previously awarded specialist status as a Business and Enterprise College.

Moor Park High School offers GCSEs and BTECs as programmes of study for pupils, while students in the sixth form (which opened in 2013) have the option to study from a range of A-levels and further BTECs.
