= Academy@Worden =

Worden Academy
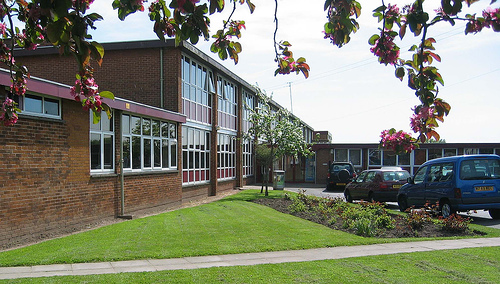

Location
- Leyland, Lancashire; England; 53.6926°N 2.7132°W

Information
- Type: Academy
- Established: 1955
- Department for Education URN: 139290 Tables
- Ofsted: Reports
- Headteacher: Alan Hammersley
- Staff: 52
- Gender: Coeducational
- Age: 11 to 16
- Capacity: 900
- Website: http://www.academyatworden.co.uk/

Worden Academy is a coeducational secondary school with academy status, located in Leyland, in the South Ribble district of Lancashire, England.

== History ==
It opened in 1955 as Worden County Secondary School, and became Worden High School in 1972 with the introduction of the Comprehensive System to Lancashire and the abolition of the 11-plus examination. The school was renamed Worden Sports College when it became a specialist Sports College. The school converted to academy status in February 2013 and was renamed Worden Academy.

In the early 1990s, the ROSLA block was gradually sold off to the Westfield Centre, with a major extension to the building being completed by 2003. The first Worden Sports College web site went live on 6 March 1996. Online newspaper "Making The News" goes live October 2005. The new Virtual Learning Environment (VLE) Moodle went live July 2006. 2004 the school field had a new £150,000 field drainage system put in.

The Sports Hall and entrance were refurbished as a result of the Sports College status. Subsequently, two classrooms were knocked together to form the first air-conditioned computer suite followed by the second suite in September 2006. The third computer suite followed later that year.

Mrs Rignall – Headteacher, Mayor of South Ribble, Mr Taylor – Head of Science and actress Suzanne Hall

A refurbished £500,000 Science Block (The Newton Suite) was officially opened on 28 September 2007 by the Mayor of South Ribble and Suzanne Hall (Hollyoaks actress).

The pupil admission number changed from 118 to 180 in 2025, increasing the total capacity from 590 to 900.

== Headteachers ==
Years	Worden Sports College
1955 – >1976	Mr A. G. Moffatt, BSc
>1976–1989	Mr Makereth
	Mr D. R. Tilston, MEd, B.A.
	Mrs S. Rignall, M.A., BSc (Hons.), NPQH
2010–2020	Mr. C Catherall
2020–present	Mr. A Hammersley

== House system ==
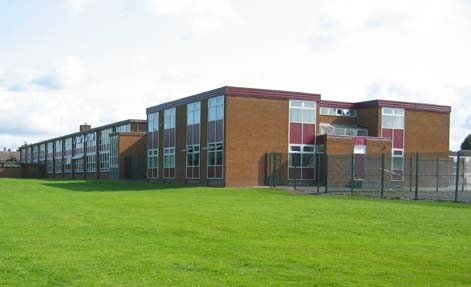
The southeast wing of the school

The original house system, used the names of local rivers: Shaw, Lostock, Bannister and Atherton. After many years of no house system, a 2005 relaunch created four houses of Dragon (red), Griffin (blue), Phoenix (yellow) and Unicorn (green). In 2018, the houses changed to Windsor (red), Kensington (yellow), Clarence (green) and Balmoral (blue).

== National competitions ==
In 2004, together with the Wellcome Trust, the BBC launched a national photographic competition inviting entries on the theme of 'How is Science changing us?' The competition focused specifically on developments in bio-medical technology and was open to both individuals and group entries from schools. The team's entry was awarded RUNNERS UP prize in the schools section, winning £1000 of photographic equipment for the school and £50 worth of equipment for each pupil involved. They were invited to the Royal Albert Hall, London, to collect their prize. All photos will be part of a national exhibition that will tour six venues around the country.

== World record ==
61 boys and girls from Worden took part in a 'keepy uppy' world record attempt on 26 April 2006. It was organised by the England fans and The FA with over 650 schoolchildren from 16 schools throughout England taking part. The officials were in constant radio contact with each school, to make sure every pupil could keep the footballs in the air for ten seconds. 459 pupils managed to keep the footballs in the air at the same time to beat the previous record of 446 which had stood for the last seven years.
