= Highfield Leadership Academy =

Location
- Highfield Road; Blackpool, Lancashire, FY4 3JZ; England; 53.7880°N 3.0290°W

Information
- Type: Academy
- Established: 2016
- Local authority: Blackpool
- Trust: Star Academies
- Department for Education URN: 142469 Tables
- Ofsted: Reports
- Principal: Kim Greenwood
- Gender: Co-educational
- Age: 11 to 16
- Enrolment: 1,130
- Website: https://www.highfieldleadershipacademy.com/

Highfield Leadership Academy is a co-educational secondary school located in Marton, Blackpool, Lancashire, England.

== History ==
It was originally known as Highfield High School. In 2004 the Department for Children, Schools and Families (DCSF) awarded the school specialist school status as a Humanities College, focusing on the teaching and study of History, Geography and Religious Education. The school was subsequently renamed Highfield Humanities College.

In 2007 the school featured in the DCSF list of schools that had made the best sustained improvements in their GCSE results over the previous four years.

In August/September 2012 the school moved into a new building on the old playing field. The old school building, which stood for nearly eighty years, was demolished shortly after.

Previously a community school administered by Blackpool Borough Council, in April 2016 Highfield Humanities College closed and converted to academy status and was renamed Highfield Leadership Academy. The school is now part of Star Academies.

== Academics ==
Highfield Leadership Academy offers GCSEs as programmes of study for pupils.

Unlike other schools in the area, the academy is notable for the number of subjects it offers and expects of its pupils. Whilst most pupils of British secondary schools only study around 6 GCSEs, those at HLA study up to 13. All pupils must study the mandatory subjects (English, Maths, Science etc.) as well as at least one language, a humanities subject (RE, Geography, History) and a computer-based subject. Art subjects remain optional.

== Governance and Ofsted ==
During its time as 'Highfield Humanities College', its philosophy was a more liberal one, hence the name 'college'. During this period, it was considered to be a mid-tier secondary school for the area. This was until 2014, where it was rated 'inadequate' by Ofsted. As such, it was ordered to become an academy, and was put in the hands of Tauheedul Education Trust, which is now Star Academies.

Prior to the takeover, the school was the subject of negative reports from local press, telling of an apparent student riot. The headmistress at the time witnessed to the incident and compared it to the Hillsborough Disaster. In the same year, there was also a case of arson from two pupils, where the entire student body was evacuated and the building flooded by sprinklers. The headmistress later resigned.

In February 2019 the school was declared by Ofsted to be inadequate on all fronts, with reports of discrimination, failure to tackle bullying, failure to safeguard pupils, and an apparent "overgenerous view of the school’s effectiveness".

In September 2019, Ofsted stated that the academy had much improved. In February 2020, Ofsted wrote:

Since the last monitoring inspection, more pupils are benefiting from high-quality teaching. Many teachers present subject matter in a way that helps pupils to develop their knowledge and understanding." Although, Ofsted have still identified areas for improvement, the academy stands today as a good school, albeit a strict one.

After the title of ‘Highfield Humanities College’ was relinquished in 2015, the school moved to the Star Academies education trust, which specialises in Islamic faith schools, with HLA the first of its partners to be secular.

== Notable former pupils ==
- Joe Bullock, rugby league player
- Steven Croft, cricketer
- Anna Jobarteh, actor
- David Thewlis, actor
- Shelly Woods, paralympian
- James Cahill, snooker player
