= Walton-le-Dale High School =

Location
- Brindle Road; Bamber Bridge, Lancashire, PR5 6RN; England; 53°44′11″N 2°39′17″W

Information
- Type: Community school
- Motto: Learning for Life
- Established: 1957
- Local authority: Lancashire
- Department for Education URN: 119743 Tables
- Ofsted: Reports
- Head teacher: Paul Lamoury
- Gender: Coeducational
- Age: 11 to 16
- Website: www.waltonledale.lancs.sch.uk/

Walton-le-Dale High School, formerly known as Walton-le-Dale Arts College and High School, is a secondary school near Preston, Lancashire, England.

== History ==
Walton-le-Dale High School was opened in 1957 as a 3 form entry secondary school for boys and girls aged 11–15 years. The school grew gradually until, in 1977, it was reorganised as an 11-16 comprehensive school. Despite being a comprehensive, the school tried to establish a grammar school type ethos, with the senior teachers wearing academic gowns for morning assemblies, a coat of arms, and a motto, "Knowledge is Strength". The pupils were typically streamed into classes based on academic ability; W, A, L, T for the upper band, O and N for the middle band, and H, B, and S for the lower band. There was further streaming for sets for the core subjects of maths, English, history, Geography, French, and the sciences. Following end of year examinations pupils would often be moved between sets but only rarely between bands. In addition the pupils were allocated into 4 different houses for sporting competitions, these being Shaftesbury colour red, Jenner colour green, Newton colour yellow and Faraday colour blue.

The school submitted a bid for dual specialist status in performing arts and business and enterprise in 2005. The school was designated with specialist status for Performing Arts, a status that it held until specialist status ceased to exist for secondary schools in England. The school reverted to its previous name in 2016 when schools in England ceased to have specialist status.

Walton-le-Dale High School is now an 11-16 comprehensive school with a very distinctive ethos The school is highly regarded for inclusion having held the Inclusion Quality Mark since 2007 with Flagship status since 2014. This is rooted in the ethos of the school which values each individual equally, recognising their strengths and talents. The school ethos clearly values education as being for life and as being more than just preparing students for examinations
