= Tauheedul Islam Boys' High School =

Location
- Sumner Street; Blackburn; Lancashire, BB2 2LD; England

Information
- Type: Free school
- Religious affiliation: Islam
- Established: 2012
- Local authority: Blackburn with Darwen
- Trust: Star Academies
- Department for Education URN: 138220 Tables
- Ofsted: Reports
- Principal: Majid Ditta
- Gender: Boys
- Age: 11 (high school) 16 (college) to 16 (high school) 18 (college)
- Enrolment: 351 as of February 2016
- Capacity: 800
- Website: www.tibhs.com

Tauheedul Islam Boys' High School (TIBHS) is a secondary free school for boys in Blackburn, Lancashire.

== Background ==
TIBHS opened in September 2012 and received an "Outstanding" Ofsted inspection in 2014.

The school moved building to Shadsworth Road, and then permanently to Sumner Street in 2019. The new building is also planned to house the Tauheedul 6th Form.

This free school opened in September 2012 as part of the Tauheedul Free Schools Trust. It has not been previously inspected.

The school is smaller than the average-sized secondary school but a rapidly expanding 11–18 academy. Currently it has 254 students in Years 7, 8 and 9.

The school is housed temporarily in a former junior school building.

There are no public examination results by which to measure the school’s performance against the government’s current floor standards, which are the minimum expectations for students’ attainment and progress.

The school does not make use of alternative provision.

The leadership and management of the school are shared between a Chief Executive and an Executive Principal.

The school has a local governing body

== Pupils ==
Nearly all students are of Asian heritage, mainly Indian or Pakistani. The proportion of students who speak English as an additional language is well above average.

The proportion of students known to be eligible for the pupil premium support is average. The pupil premium provides additional funding for students who are known to be eligible for free school meals, children from service families and children looked after by the local authority.

The proportion of students supported through school action is below average. The proportion of students supported at school action plus or with a statement of special educational needs is average.
