= All Saints' Catholic High School, Rawtenstall =

Coordinates: 53.6974°N 2.3061°W

All Saints' Catholic High School
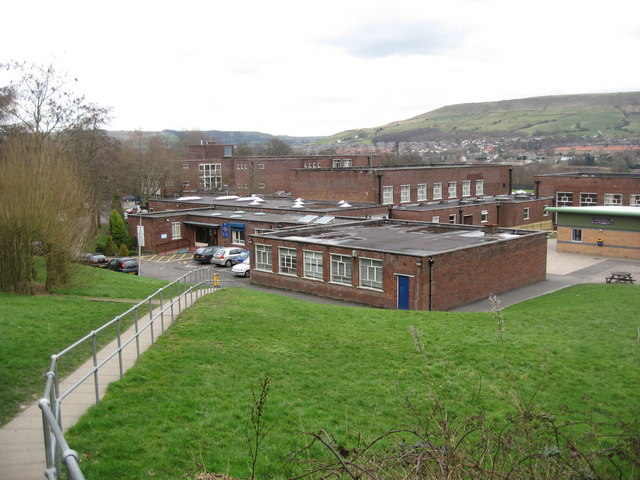
- View of the school (2007)

Location
- Haslingden Road; Rawtenstall; Lancashire, BB4 6SH; England

Information
- Type: Academy
- Religious affiliation: Roman Catholic
- Local authority: Lancashire
- Trust: Romero Catholic Academy Trust
- Department for Education URN: 147565 Tables
- Ofsted: Reports
- Headteacher: Frankie Lord
- Gender: Coeducational
- Age: 11 to 16
- Website: www.allsaintshigh.lancs.sch.uk

All Saints' Catholic High School is a coeducational Roman Catholic secondary school located in Rawtenstall, Lancashire, England.

== History ==
The school is located on a large site off Haslingden Road. The main building was completed in 1959, and was called Saint Ambrose secondary modern school with upper school facilities opening in 1972. A new modern foreign language centre – The Fishwick Centre - was built as part of the development of the school as a Specialist Language College. This provides four specialist language teaching rooms, including a computer suite.

In September 2010 a new sports hall was opened.

In November 2025 the pupils moved into a new multi-million pound state of the art school situated on the same site as the original school. The original school is now to be demolished.

Previously a voluntary aided school administered by Lancashire County Council, in July 2017 All Saints' Catholic High School converted to academy status. The school is now sponsored by the Romero Catholic Academy Trust.

== Feeder schools ==
- St. James-the-Less, Rawtenstall
- St. Peter’s, Newchurch
- St. Veronica’s, Helmshore
- St. Mary’s, Haslingden
- St. Joseph's, Stacksteads
- St. Mary's, Bacup
- Our Lady & St. Anselm's, Whitworth.

== Notable former pupils ==
- Agyness Deyn model and actress (born Laura Hollins in 1983). Agyness had a successful modelling career and became one of the UKs top models. Latterly she because an actress and has had many successful roles in film.
- Aaron Hayden born c1995 is a professional boxer who recently won the super bantamweight regional title.
- Marc Pugh, professional football player
- Ryan Herbert, murderer
