= Stacksteads =

Village in Lancashire, England

Coordinates: 53.692°N 2.220°W

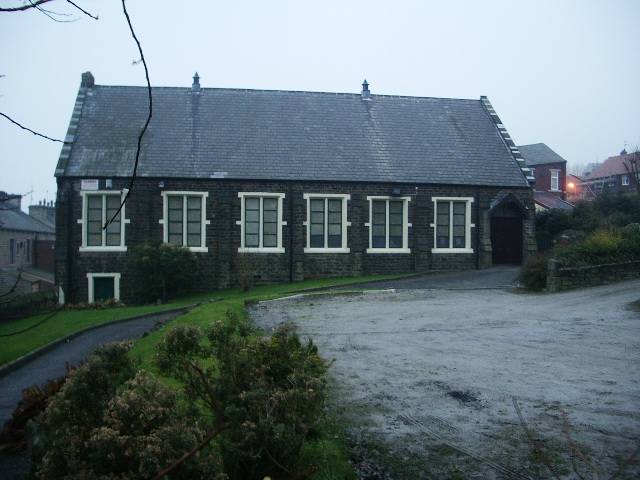
- Acre Mill Baptist Church in 2007

- Location within Rossendale Location within Lancashire
- Population: 3,789 (2011 census)
- District: Rossendale
- Shire county: Lancashire
- Region: North West
- Country: England
- Sovereign state: United Kingdom
- Post town: BACUP
- Postcode district: OL13
- Dialling code: 01706
- Police: Lancashire
- Fire: Lancashire
- Ambulance: North West
- UK Parliament: Rossendale and Darwen

Stacksteads is a village between the towns of Bacup and Waterfoot within the Rossendale borough of Lancashire, England. The population of this Rossendale ward at the 2011 census was 3,789. Stacksteads includes a mountain bike trail called Lee Quarry which had originally been a working quarry.

It is part of the Rossendale and Darwen constituency, with Andy MacNae becoming Member of Parliament in 2024.

== History ==
In the 19th century it was home to several cotton mills along the banks of the River Irwell. These expanded after the ending of the American Civil War. During the 1870s agricultural labourers moved from across the UK – including many from East Anglia – to drive this expansion.

During the 20th century, as the cotton trade decreased in the face of overseas manufacture, some of the mills were adapted to more modern purposes such as footwear – notably the Bacup Shoe Company in the former Stacksteads Mill. In the 1980s, the village featured in a number of episodes of the long running BBC1 police procedural drama series Juliet Bravo, set in a fictional part of the Rossendale Valley between Rawtenstall and Bacup. It was also the location for the filming of Laurence Olivier Presents: Hindle Wakes, a 1976 television film of the stage play, directed by Laurence Olivier, that starred Rosalind Ayres, Judi Bowker, and Roy Dotrice.

== Today ==
The area is today noted for a high number of reported UFO sightings and featured in one episode of a 2008 Five TV series on British cases.

Stacksteads has a Rosso Bus 464 going through it every 10 minutes via the main road through the village, Newchurch Road. There is a secondary school called The Valley Leadership Academy.

Stacksteads is home to the famous Kimberley Club formed in 1897 as a drinking club for quarry workers. Lit and warmed by gas (no electricity), it is still going strong and sells real ale direct from the barrel.

From 1903 until 2011, Stacksteads Cricket Club played on Waterbarn Recreation Ground adjacent to Waterbarn Baptist Church. The club moved to New Hall Hey Cricket Ground in nearby Rawtenstall after difficulties with the landlord who also owns the Grade II listed Waterbarn Baptist Chapel on Brandwood Road built in 1847.
