= Preston Muslim Girls High School =

Location
- Quwwatul Education Centre; Peel Hall Street; Deepdale; Preston, Lancashire, PR1 6QQ; England; 53.76704°N 2.68644°W

Information
- Type: Voluntary aided school
- Religious affiliation: Islam
- Established: 1989
- Local authority: Preston
- Department for Education URN: 136801 Tables
- Ofsted: Reports
- Headteacher: Rehan Patel
- Gender: Coeducational
- Age: 11 to 16
- Website: http://www.pmghs.com/

Preston Muslim Girls High School is a secondary school located in the Deepdale area of Preston in the English county of Lancashire.

It was founded in 1989 as a private Islamic school for girls. In 2011 it became a voluntary aided school and part of the state-funded sector administered by Preston City Council.

Preston Muslim Girls High School GCSEs and BTECs as programmes of study for pupils. Girls at the school also have the option to take part in the Duke of Edinburgh's Award programme.
