= The Valley Leadership Academy =

Location
- Fearns Moss, Stacksteads; Bacup, Lancashire, OL13 0TG; England; 53°41′22″N 2°19′13″W

Information
- Former name: Fearns Community Sports College
- Type: Academy
- Local authority: Lancashire County Council
- Trust: Star Academies
- Department for Education URN: 147018 Tables
- Ofsted: Reports
- Executive Principal: Lee Waring
- Gender: Co-educational
- Age range: 11–16
- Capacity: 1,050
- Website: thevalleyleadershipacademy.com

The Valley Leadership Academy (formerly Fearns Community Sports College) is an 11–16 co-educational secondary school with academy status in Stacksteads, Bacup, Lancashire, England. It was formerly a community school and adopted its present name after becoming an academy in July 2019. It is part of Star Academies.

== School inspections ==
Logo of Fearns Community Sports College.

In June 2014, the school was placed in special measures, after being rated 'inadequate' in every category of the latest Ofsted report. The inspectors stated that "marking is ‘inconsistent’, pupil attendance is poor and senior leaders and governors have failed to improve the quality of teaching and raise achievement since the last ‘satisfactory’ inspection in June 2012".

After two further inspections also deemed the school to be inadequate, in September 2023 Ofsted rated the school as 'requires improvement', following its first inspection since becoming an academy.

== Notable former pupils ==
- Brendan Harris, murderer
- Matty James, professional footballer
- Reece James, professional footballer
