= Bay Leadership Academy =

School in Heysham, Lancashire, England

Location
- Limes Avenue; Morecambe, Lancashire, LA3 1HS; England; 54.06005°N 2.87818°W

Information
- Type: Academy
- Local authority: Lancashire
- Trust: Star Academies
- Department for Education URN: 144646 Tables
- Ofsted: Reports
- Executive headteacher: Lee Waring
- Principal: Stacey Cantley
- Gender: Co-educational
- Age: 11 to 16
- Website: https://www.bayleadershipacademy.com/

Bay Leadership Academy (formerly Heysham High School/Balmoral Secondary) is a co-educational secondary school and former sixth form in Morecambe in the English county of Lancashire.

The school serves pupils mainly from the Heysham, Morecambe and Lancaster areas.

Previously a community school administered by Lancashire County Council, in June 2018 Heysham High School converted to academy status and was renamed Bay Leadership Academy. The school is now sponsored by Star Academies.

== Curriculum ==
Virtually all maintained schools and academies follow the National Curriculum, and are inspected by Ofsted on how well they succeed in delivering a 'broad and balanced curriculum'. Schools endeavour to get all students to achieve the English Baccalaureate(EBACC) qualification- this must include core subjects a modern or ancient foreign language, and either History or Geography.

The school operates a two-year, Key Stage 3 where all the core National Curriculum subjects are taught allowing more time to prepare for exams.. Year 7 and Year 8 study core subjects: English, Mathematics, Science. The following foundation subjects are offered: Art & Design, Computing, Design & Technology, Drama, Ethics & Life Skills PSHE & RE, French, Geography and History, Music and PE.

For Key Stage 4 Bay Leadership Academy offers GCSEs, BTECs and City and Guilds courses as programmes of study for pupils.
