= Our Lady's Catholic College =

Location
- Morecambe Road; Lancaster, Lancashire, LA1 2RX; England
- Coordinates: 54.05492°N 2.8018°W

Information
- Type: Voluntary aided school
- Motto: A Caring Catholic Community
- Religious affiliation: Roman Catholic
- Established: 1964
- Local authority: Lancashire
- Department for Education URN: 119798 Tables
- Ofsted: Reports
- Headteacher: Helen Seddon
- Gender: Mixed
- Age: 11 to 18
- Enrolment: 865
- Houses: Luce and Veritas
- Website: http://www.olcc.lancs.sch.uk

Our Lady's Catholic College (OLCC) is a mixed sex secondary school for pupils aged 11–18. It is located in Skerton, just off the A6 road, north of the River Lune, Lancaster in the North West of England. Formerly Our Lady's Catholic High School, it changed its name after being awarded Specialist Sports College status in September 2003. The college teaches Key Stage 3, Key Stage 4, and Sixth Form.

Helen Seddon, a former pupil, has been head teacher since September 2015. She took over from Brendan Conroy, who retired in July 2015. Conboy had been at Our Lady's since September 2007.

== Description ==
This is an 11-19 secondary school principally for Roman Catholic pupils and students: it draws from 28 feeder primary schools from Lancaster and Northern Lancashire. Pupils entered the school in 2016 with a significantly lower prior attainment than national average. While at the school, low-and middle-ability pupils make the fastest progress while high-ability pupils make progress in line with the national average. By the end of year eleven the proportion of pupils attaining at least a C grade in both English and mathematics mirrors the national average. Mathematics is stronger than English: impressive rates of progress were made in vocational courses, information technology and religious studies.

=== Curriculum ===
Virtually all maintained schools and academies follow the National Curriculum, and are inspected by Ofsted on how well they succeed in delivering a 'broad and balanced curriculum'.

The school has to decide whether Key Stage 3 contains years 7, 8 and 9- or whether year 9 should be in Key Stage 4 and the students just study subjects that will be examined by the GCSE exams at 16. Our Lady's aim that all students experience a broad and balanced curriculum in their first three years, with an academic approach to the curriculum in order to prepare for KS4 studies. The KS3 curriculum encompasses the core subjects of English, Maths and Science, plus RE, history, geography and languages.

The practical and creative subjects; PE, Technology, including Product design, Food, Textiles and also Art, Drama, Dance and Music are an important part of a students education, the school believes, so has decided to maximise the time available doing a full three year KS 3.

In Key Stage 4 students principally study a range of GCSE courses. The English Baccalaureate subjects of English, Maths, Science, History, Geography and languages were at centre of the curriculum in KS3 and they are available to all students, so they each have the opportunity to study for the English Baccalaureate and obtain an EBacc APS. Too few pupils choose to study a language so can't obtain an EBacc. The course is structured on the Progress 8 model. Students study the core subjects of English maths and science. RE is also compulsory. Students then choose the humanity from Geography, History and French. They then have choice of options from a range of GCSE and vocational subjects. A small minority of students will not take a Humanity but do the Work skills BTec and an IT qualification.

At Key Stage 5 a range of A levels and Level 3 BTECs are on offer. For example, in 2020, Art and Design, Biology Chemistry, Drama, English and English Literature, Geography, History, Mathematics, Physics, Religious Studies and Sociology were offered at A level and Applied Science, Art and Design, Business Studies, Food Science and Nutrition, Health and Social Care (optional Childcare module), ICT, Performing Arts, Sport and Travel and Tourism as BTECs. Modern Foreign Languages are notable by their absence.

== Notable former students ==
Notable former students include:

- Scott McTominay, professional footballer who plays as a midfielder for Premier League club Manchester United and the Scotland national team.
- Emma Atkins, actress

== Notable events ==
On 22 June 2012, the Olympic Flame passed through the college as part of the Olympic Torch Relays of 2012.
