= 2023 West Lancashire by-election =

UK parliamentary by-election

- 9 February 2023

West Lancashire constituency
- Turnout: 31.4% (▼40.7 pp)
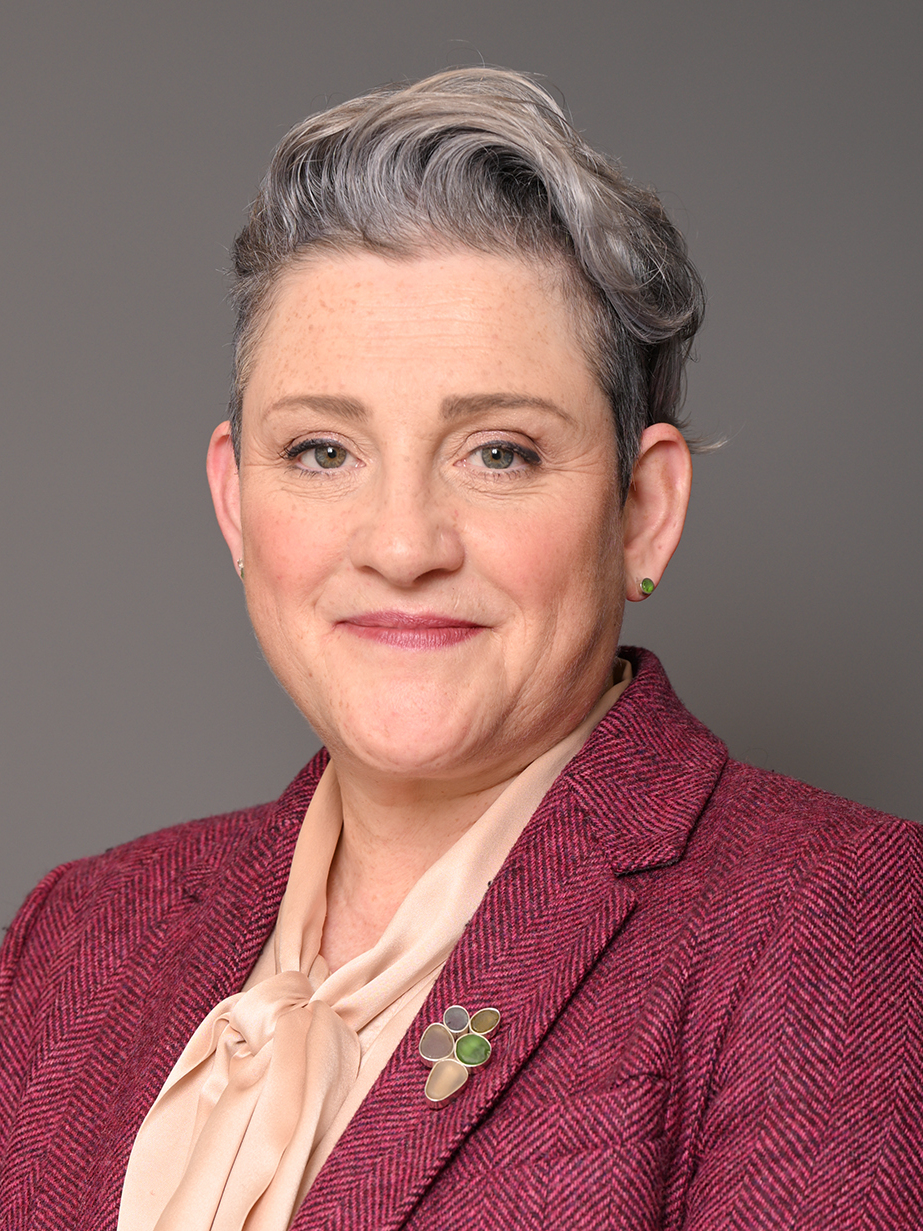
	First party	Second party
		Con
Candidate	Ashley Dalton	Mike Prendergast
Party	Labour	Conservative
Last election	52.1%	36.3%
Popular vote	14,068	5,742
Percentage	62.3%	25.4%
Swing	▲10.2 pp	▼10.9 pp
MP before election
Rosie Cooper
Labour
Elected MP
Ashley Dalton
Labour

A by-election for the United Kingdom parliamentary constituency of West Lancashire was held on 9 February 2023, following the resignation of incumbent Labour Party MP Rosie Cooper in order to take up the job of chair of Mersey Care NHS Foundation Trust. Ashley Dalton held the seat for Labour.

== Background ==
West Lancashire covers the southern part of the borough of the same name, with the major settlements being the towns of Burscough, Ormskirk and Skelmersdale. The rest of the population live in the surrounding villages. The seat is considered part of the red wall, and voted 55% in favour of Brexit in the 2016 EU membership referendum.

The constituency was created as the successor to Ormskirk for the 1983 general election and was held by Conservative Ken Hind until 1992 when it was taken for Labour by Colin Pickthall. Pickthall retired in 2005, and was succeeded by former Liberal Democrat candidate Rosie Cooper who was re-elected at each subsequent election. West Lancashire is considered a strong Labour seat.

Cooper had served as MP since the 2005 general election. She announced her resignation in September 2022. In November, The Times reported that Cooper was delaying her resignation in an attempt to secure a peerage, meaning that the writ of election could not be moved until January 2023 at the earliest. Cooper resigned her seat on 30 November, by means of being appointed as Steward of the Chiltern Hundreds. The by-election was the first scheduled in 2023 and was the first by-election held in the West Lancashire constituency.

== Candidates ==
Amid speculation that he might wish to enter Parliament again in the future, Andy Burnham, the Mayor of Greater Manchester, declined to run for Labour. Football broadcaster Gary Neville likewise declined to seek the Labour Party nomination.

In October 2022, Ashley Dalton, a candidate for Rochford and Southend East in 2017 and 2019, was confirmed as Labour's candidate for the by-election. Labour had shortlisted three women to be their candidate: Dalton; Emma Fox, former shortlisted candidate for Warrington South and daughter of Speaker of the House of Commons Lindsay Hoyle; and Louise Harbour, former deputy leader of Knowsley Council until she lost her seat in the 2022 local elections. Other candidates on the longlist had included councillor for Knowsley ward Adam Yates; county councillor for Skelmersdale West Julie Gibson; Michael Denoual; and Nikki Hennessy.

The Conservative Party confirmed in October 2022 that Mike Prendergast, an Ormskirk-based solicitor and councillor for Dukes ward on Sefton Council, would be its candidate in the by-election.

The Liberal Democrats announced that Jo Barton, former councillor for Meols ward (also on Sefton Council) and candidate for the same constituency in the 2017 general election, would be their candidate.

== Result ==
Bar chart of the election result.

2023 West Lancashire by-election
Party	Candidate	Votes	%	±%
Labour	Ashley Dalton	14,068	62.3	+10.2
Conservative	Mike Prendergast	5,742	25.4	–10.9
Reform	Jonathan Kay	997	4.4	+0.1
Liberal Democrats	Jo Barton	918	4.1	–0.8
Green	Peter Cranie	646	2.9	+0.5
Monster Raving Loony	Howling Laud Hope	210	0.9	New
Majority		8,326	36.9	+21.1
Total valid votes		22,581		
Rejected ballots		58		
Turnout		22,639	31.4	–40.7
Registered electors		72,199		
Labour hold		Swing	+10.5	

== Previous result ==
General election 2019: West Lancashire
Party	Candidate	Votes	%	±%
Labour	Rosie Cooper	27,458	52.1	–6.8
Conservative	Jack Gilmore	19,122	36.3	–1.1
Liberal Democrats	Simon Thomson	2,560	4.9	+2.9
Brexit Party	Marc Stanton	2,275	4.3	New
Green	John Puddifer	1,248	2.4	+1.1
Majority		8,336	15.8	–5.7
Turnout		52,663	72.0	–2.4
Labour hold		Swing	–2.9	
