= Engineering College (United Kingdom specialist schools programme) =

Engineering Colleges logo

Engineering Colleges were introduced in 2002 as part of the Specialist Schools Programme in England. The system enabled secondary schools to specialise in certain fields, in this case engineering. Schools that successfully applied to the Specialist Schools Trust and became Engineering Colleges received extra funding for teaching from this joint private sector and government scheme. Engineering Colleges act as a local point of reference for other schools and businesses in the area. Schools can currently become Engineering Colleges through the Dedicated Schools Grant or by becoming an academy. This is because the Specialist Schools Programme has been defunct since 2011.

== List of specialist engineering colleges ==
School	LEA
Devonport High School for Boys	Plymouth
Eckington School	Derbyshire
The Bishop Stopford's School	Enfield
The Gateway Academy	Thurrock
Priory City of Lincoln Academy	Lincolnshire
Woodchurch High School Engineering College	Wirral
Carr Hill High School and Sixth Form Centre	Lancashire
Chelmer Valley High School	Essex
Faringdon Community College	Oxfordshire
Great Sankey High School	Warrington
Hartcliffe Engineering Community College	Bristol
Haywood High School and Engineering College	Stoke-on-Trent
Ormesby School	Middlesbrough
Ridgewood School	Doncaster
Skipton Girls' High School	North Yorkshire
Balshaw's Church of England High School	Lancashire
Beverley Grammar School	East Riding of Yorkshire
Brumby Engineering College	North Lincolnshire
Cleeve Park School	Bexley
Congleton High School	Cheshire
Coquet High School	Northumberland
Hawkley Hall High School	Wigan
Liskeard School and Community College	Cornwall
Newstead Wood School for Girls	Bromley
Our Lady Queen of Peace Catholic Engineering College	Lancashire
Quilley School of Engineering	Hampshire
Sackville School	West Sussex
St Hild's Church of England School	Hartlepool
The Douay Martyrs Catholic School	Hillingdon
Wallington High School for Girls	Sutton
Wednesfield High School	Wolverhampton
Whitecross School	Gloucestershire
Wilmington Grammar School for Boys	Kent
Winterton Comprehensive School	North Lincolnshire
Danetre School	Northamptonshire
Freebrough Specialist Engineering College	Redcar and Cleveland
Hinde House School	Sheffield
The Heathcote School	Hertfordshire
Top Valley School	Nottingham
Darwen Vale High School	Blackburn
Hadley Learning Community	Telford and Wrekin
Ripon Grammar School	North Yorkshire
Sinfin Community School	Derby
St. George of England Specialist Engineering College	Sefton
St John's Church of England School	Essex
Barr's Hill School and Community College	Coventry
Bradfield School	Sheffield
Carterton Community College	Oxfordshire
Fazakerley High School	Liverpool
Jarrow School	South Tyneside
Marling School	Gloucestershire
St Alban's CE Specialist Engineering College	Birmingham
Hull Trinity House School	Kingston upon Hull
Robert Bloomfield Middle School	Bedfordshire
Samuel Whitbread Community College	Bedfordshire
Warwick School for Boys	Waltham Forest
The Forest School	West Sussex
City of Portsmouth Boys' School	Portsmouth
Broadlands School	Bath and North East Somerset
Tanfield School	Durham
Westcliff High School for Girls	Southend-on-Sea
Mangotsfield School	South Gloucestershire
Woodlands Community College	Southampton
Huntcliff School	North Lincolnshire
South Craven School	North Yorkshire
South Hunsley School	East Riding of Yorkshire
