= Harry Swainston =

English footballer

Personal information
- Date of birth: 1880
- Place of birth: Skelmersdale, England
- Position: Centre forward

Senior career*
Years	Team	Apps	(Gls)
1899–1900	Burnley	2	(0)
Total		2	(0)
- * Club domestic league appearances and goals

Henry D. Swainston (1880–?) was an English professional footballer who played as a centre forward. He played two matches in the Football League for Burnley.
