= St Paul's Church, Skelmersdale =

Coordinates: 53.5500°N 2.7924°W

St Paul's Church
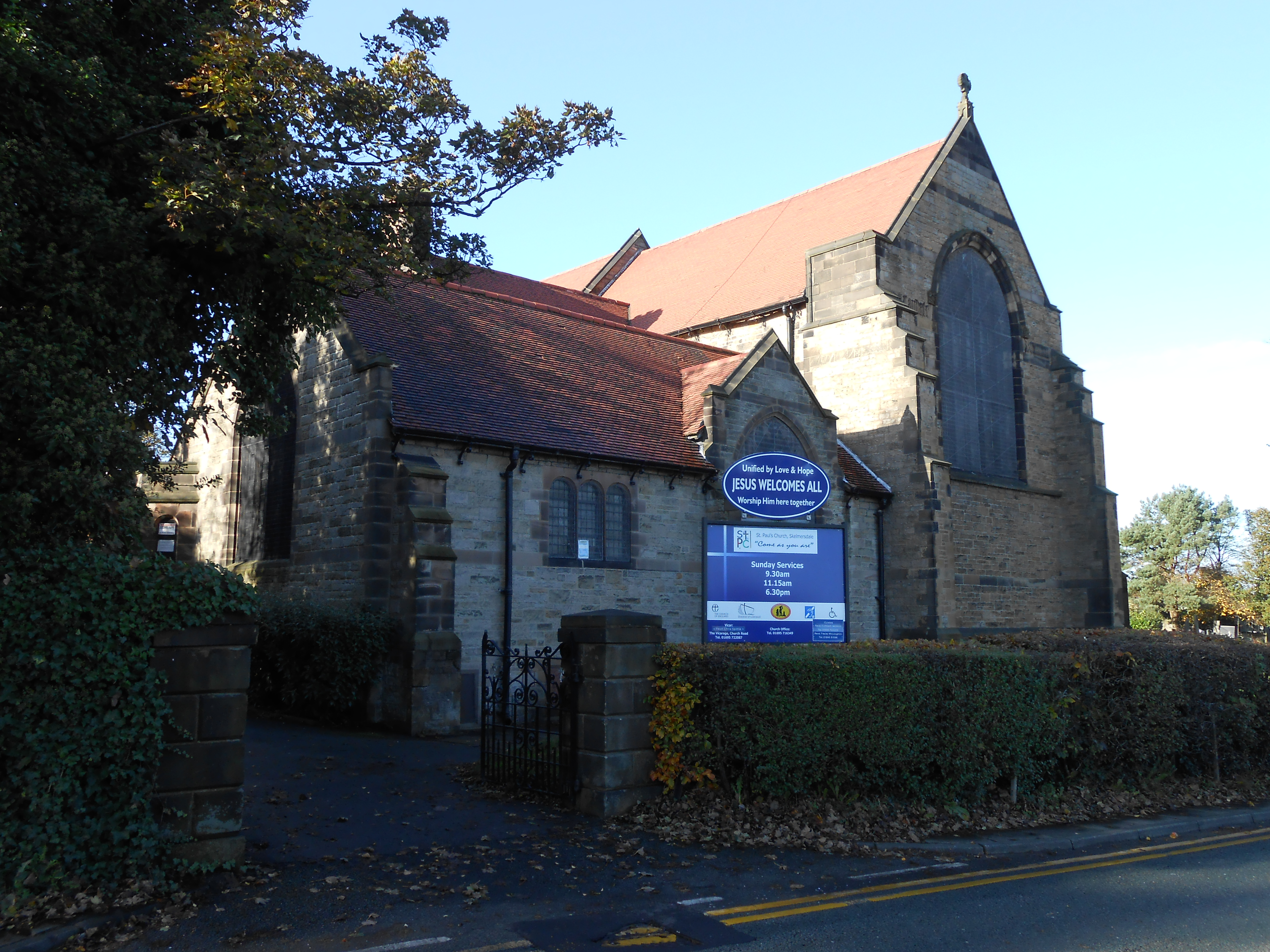

- Location in Skelmersdale Location in West Lancashire
- OS grid reference: SD 476,062
- Location: Church Road, Skelmersdale, Lancashire
- Country: England
- Denomination: Anglican
- Website: St Paul, Skelmersdale

History
- Status: Parish church
- Founded: 1776
- Dedication: Saint Paul
- Consecrated: 18 December 1906

Architecture
- Functional status: Active
- Heritage designation: Grade II
- Designated: 25 June 1973
- Architect: Austin and Paley
- Architectural type: Church
- Style: Gothic Revival
- Groundbreaking: 1903
- Completed: 1906

Specifications
- Materials: Sandstone, tiled roofs

Administration
- Province: York
- Diocese: Liverpool
- Archdeaconry: Warrington
- Deanery: Ormskirk
- Parish: St Paul, Skelmersdale

Clergy
- Vicar: Revd Christopher Spittle

St Paul's Church is in Church Road, Skelmersdale, Lancashire, England. It is an active Anglican parish church in the deanery of Ormskirk, the archdeaconry of Warrington, and the diocese of Liverpool. The church is recorded in the National Heritage List for England as a designated Grade II listed building.

== History ==
A chapel was first built in Skelmersdale in 1776 as a chapel of ease to St Peter and St Paul, Ormskirk. It was enlarged in 1823 and again in 1850. In 1856 it became a parish church in its own right, and was dedicated to Saint Paul. Later in the 19th century the chapel was damaged by subsidence due to coal mining. The present church was built on different site nearby. Its foundation stone was laid in July 1903, and the church was consecrated on 18 December 1906 by the Rt Revd Francis Chavasse, bishop of Liverpool. It was designed by the Lancaster architects Austin and Paley, and provided seating for 575 people. The plan was to add a tower on the north side of the chancel, but this was never built.

== Architecture ==
=== Exterior ===
The church is constructed in sandstone rubble with ashlar dressings, and has a red tiled roof. Its architectural style is free Perpendicular. The plan consists of a five-bay nave with a clerestory, a west canted baptistry, north and south aisles, and a chancel, with the base of the projected tower to the north, and a vestry to the south. The clerestory windows have arched heads and contain rounded tracery. The windows along the sides of the aisles are flat-headed, and also contain rounded tracery. At the west end of the church buttresses flank the baptistry, above which is an arched four-light window. On the tower base is a pyramidal roof.

=== Interior ===
Inside the church the arcades are carried on octagonal piers. Below the clerestory windows is a continuous impost with a raised carved inscription in Latin. The east window contains stained glass by Shrigley and Hunt. The two-manual pipe organ was built by Rushworth and Dreaper.

== External features ==
The churchyard contains the war graves of three service personnel of World War I, and seven of World War II.

== See also ==
- Listed buildings in Skelmersdale
- List of ecclesiastical works by Austin and Paley (1895–1914)
