= Minister of State for Public Health and Patient Safety =

Junior office of the British government

United Kingdom Minister of State for Public Health and Prevention
- Royal Arms of His Majesty's Government

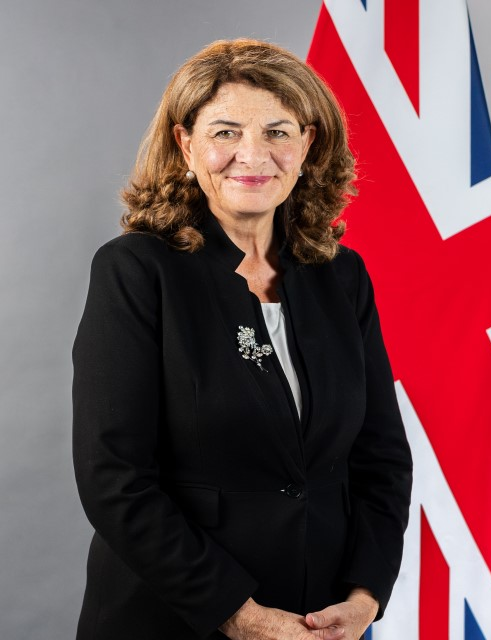
- Incumbent; Diana Johnson since 22 July 2026
- Department of Health and Social Care
- Style: Minister
- Appointer: The Monarch; on advice of the Prime Minister
- Formation: June 1970
- First holder: Paul Dean
- Website: www.gov.uk/government/ministers/minister-of-state--219

The minister of state for public health and patient safety is a position in the Department of Health and Social Care in the Government of the United Kingdom.

== History ==
The parliamentary under-secretary of state for health and social security worked at the Department of Health and Social Security. The future Prime Minister John Major held this office. The office was known as parliamentary under-secretary of state for health from 1987 to 1990.

Nicola Blackwood lost her seat in the snap 2017 general election and was replaced as a minister by Steve Brine.

During the COVID-19 pandemic in the United Kingdom, the minister was placed in charge of public health policy. The office of parliamentary under-secretary of state for COVID-19 vaccine deployment was created later and was held by Nadhim Zahawi from 28 November 2020 to 15 September 2021. Zahawi was briefly shadowed by Neale Hanvey of the Scottish National Party (SNP) but Hanvey had to resign following his support for a defamation case against a parliamentary colleague, Kirsty Blackman. In February 2021, Zahawi announced schools in England would reopen on 8 March.

In the 2021 British cabinet reshuffle, responsibilities for vaccines were merged with those for public health and given to Maggie Throup in the office of parliamentary under-secretary of state for vaccines and public health.

After the 2024 United Kingdom general election, Andrew Gwynne would be named as the new Labour parliamentary under-secretary of state for public health and prevention.

In February 2025, after Gwynne was dismissed by the government, Ashley Dalton would be named as the new minister. In March 2026 Sharon Hodgson was appointed following Ashley Dalton resigning on health grounds.

== Responsibilities ==
The minister leads on the following policy areas:

- COVID-19 vaccine deployment
- health improvement
- prevention
- immunisation and screening
- UK Health Security Agency (UKHSA)
  - emergency preparedness
  - infectious diseases
  - environmental health
- abortion
- global health security
- lead minister for crisis response
- sponsorship of FSA and UKHSA

== List of ministers of public health ==
Name	Portrait	Took office	Left office	Political party	Ministry
Role created out of the Department of Health and Social Security replacing the Parliamentary Secretary to the Ministry of Health
Parliamentary Under-Secretary of State for Health and Social Security
Paul Dean; MP for North Somerset		24 June 1970	4 March 1974	Conservative	Heath
Michael Alison; MP for Barkston Ash		24 June 1970	4 March 1974	Conservative	Heath
David Owen; MP for Plymouth Devonport		8 March 1974	26 July 1974	Labour	Wilson
Robert Brown; MP for Newcastle upon Tyne West		8 March 1974	18 October 1974	Labour	Wilson
Alec Jones; MP for Rhondda		18 October 1974	12 June 1975	Labour	Wilson
Michael Meacher; MP for Oldham West		12 June 1975	14 April 1976	Labour	Wilson
Eric Deakins; MP for Walthamstow		14 April 1976	4 May 1979	Labour	Callaghan
George Young; MP for Acton		7 May 1979	15 September 1981	Conservative	Thatcher I
Geoffrey Finsberg; MP for Hampstead		15 September 1981	14 June 1983	Conservative	Thatcher I
John Patten; MP for Oxford West and Abingdon		14 June 1983	2 September 1985	Conservative	Thatcher II
John Major; MP for Huntingdon		2 September 1985	10 September 1986	Conservative	Thatcher II
Parliamentary Under-Secretary of State for Health
Edwina Currie; MP for South Derbyshire		10 September 1986	16 December 1988	Conservative	Thatcher II & III
Roger Freeman; MP for Kettering		16 December 1988	4 May 1990	Conservative	Thatcher III
Gloria Hooper, Baroness Hooper; Life peer		28 July 1989	14 April 1992	Conservative	Thatcher III Major I
Stephen Dorrell; MP for Loughborough		4 May 1990	November 1990	Conservative	Thatcher III
Parliamentary Under-Secretary of State for Health and Social Security
Tom Sackville; MP for Bolton West		14 April 1992	29 November 1995	Conservative	Major II
Julia Cumberlege, Baroness Cumberlege; Life peer		14 April 1992	2 May 1997	Conservative	Major II
Tim Yeo; MP for South Suffolk		15 April 1992	27 May 1993	Conservative	Major II
John Bowis; MP for Battersea		27 May 1993	23 July 1996	Conservative	Major II
John Horam; MP for Orpington		29 November 1995	2 May 1997	Conservative	Major II
Simon Burns; MP for Chelmsford		23 July 1996	2 May 1997	Conservative	Major II
Minister of State for Public Health
Tessa Jowell; MP for Dulwich and West Norwood		2 May 1997	11 October 1999	Labour	Blair I
Yvette Cooper; MP for Normanton, Pontefract and Castleford		11 October 1999	28 May 2002	Labour	Blair I & II
David Lammy; MP for Tottenham		29 May 2002	13 June 2003	Labour	Blair II
Melanie Johnson; MP for Welwyn Hatfield		13 June 2003	10 May 2005	Labour	Blair II
Caroline Flint; MP for Don Valley		10 May 2005	28 June 2007	Labour	Blair III
Dawn Primarolo; MP for Bristol South		29 June 2007	5 June 2009	Labour	Brown
Gillian Merron; MP for Lincoln		10 June 2009	11 May 2010	Labour	Brown
Anne Milton; MP for Guildford		11 May 2010	4 September 2012	Conservative	Cameron–Clegg (Con.–L.D.)
Anna Soubry; MP for Broxtowe		4 September 2012	7 October 2013	Conservative	Cameron–Clegg (Con.–L.D.)
Jane Ellison; MP for Battersea		7 October 2013	15 July 2016	Conservative	Cameron–Clegg (Con.–L.D.)
Jane Ellison; MP for Battersea		7 October 2013	15 July 2016	Conservative	Cameron II
Nicola Blackwood; MP for Oxford West and Abingdon		14 July 2016	9 June 2017	Conservative	May
Parliamentary Under-Secretary of State for Public Health and Primary Care
Steve Brine MP for Winchester		14 June 2017	25 March 2019	Conservative	May II
Seema Kennedy; MP for South Ribble		4 April 2019	26 July 2019	Conservative	May II
Parliamentary Under-Secretary of State for Prevention, Public Health and Primary Care
Jo Churchill; MP for Bury St Edmunds		26 July 2019	15 September 2021	Conservative	Johnson I & II
Parliamentary Under-Secretary of State for Vaccines and Public Health
Maggie Throup; MP for Erewash		15 September 2021	6 September 2022	Conservative	Johnson II
Parliamentary Under-Secretary of State for Primary Care and Public Health
Neil O'Brien; MP for Harborough		8 September 2022	13 November 2023	Conservative	Truss Sunak
Parliamentary Under-Secretary of State for Public Health, Start for Life and Primary Care
Dame Andrea Leadsom; MP for South Northamptonshire		13 November 2023	5 July 2024	Conservative	Sunak
Parliamentary Under-Secretary of State for Public Health and Prevention
Andrew Gwynne; MP for Gorton and Denton		9 July 2024	8 February 2025	Labour	Starmer
Ashley Dalton; MP for West Lancashire		10 February 2025	2 March 2026	Labour	Starmer
Sharon Hodgson; MP for Washington and Gateshead South		3 March 2026	22 July 2026	Labour	Starmer
Minister of State for Public Health and Prevention
Diana Johnson; MP for Kingston upon Hull North and Cottingham		22 July 2026	Incumbent	Labour	Burnham

== Other ministerial appointments ==
=== COVID-19 vaccine deployment ===
Name	Portrait	Took office	Left office	Political party	Prime Minister
Parliamentary Under-Secretary of State for COVID-19 Vaccine Deployment
Nadhim Zahawi; MP for Stratford-on-Avon		28 November 2020	15 September 2021	Conservative	Boris Johnson (ll)

=== Patient safety and primary care ===
Name	Portrait	Took office	Left office	Political party	Prime Minister
Parliamentary Under-Secretary of State for Patient Safety and Primary Care
Maria Caulfield; MP for Lewes		17 September 2021	7 July 2022	Conservative	Boris Johnson (ll)
James Morris; MP for Halesowen and Rowley Regis		8 July 2022	8 September 2022	Conservative	Boris Johnson (ll)

== See also ==
- Health minister
- COVID-19 vaccination programme in the United Kingdom
- COVID-19 pandemic in the United Kingdom
- List of government ministers of the United Kingdom
