= Our Lady Queen of Peace Catholic Engineering College =

Our Lady Queen Of Peace Catholic Engineering College

Location
- Glenburn Road; Skelmersdale; Lancashire, WN8 6JW; England; 53.56283°N 2.79167°W

Information
- Type: Voluntary aided school
- Motto: In Christ We Grow
- Religious affiliation: Roman Catholic
- Local authority: Lancashire
- Specialist: Engineering
- Department for Education URN: 119782 Tables
- Ofsted: Reports
- Headteacher: Mary Henshaw
- Gender: Coeducational
- Age: 11 to 16
- Enrolment: 894 as of December 2022
- Houses: Arkwright, Brunel, Franklin, Stephenson, Telford
- Website: http://www.olqp.org.uk/

Our Lady Queen of Peace Catholic Engineering College is a coeducational Roman Catholic secondary school located in Skelmersdale in the English county of Lancashire.

It is a voluntary aided school administered by Lancashire County Council and the Roman Catholic Archdiocese of Liverpool. The school is currently designated as a specialist Engineering College.

Our Lady Queen of Peace Catholic Engineering College offers GCSEs as programmes of study for pupils. The school also offers some vocational courses in conjunction with Myerscough College and West Lancashire College.
