= The Heathcote School =

Coordinates: 51°53′24″N 0°10′44″W

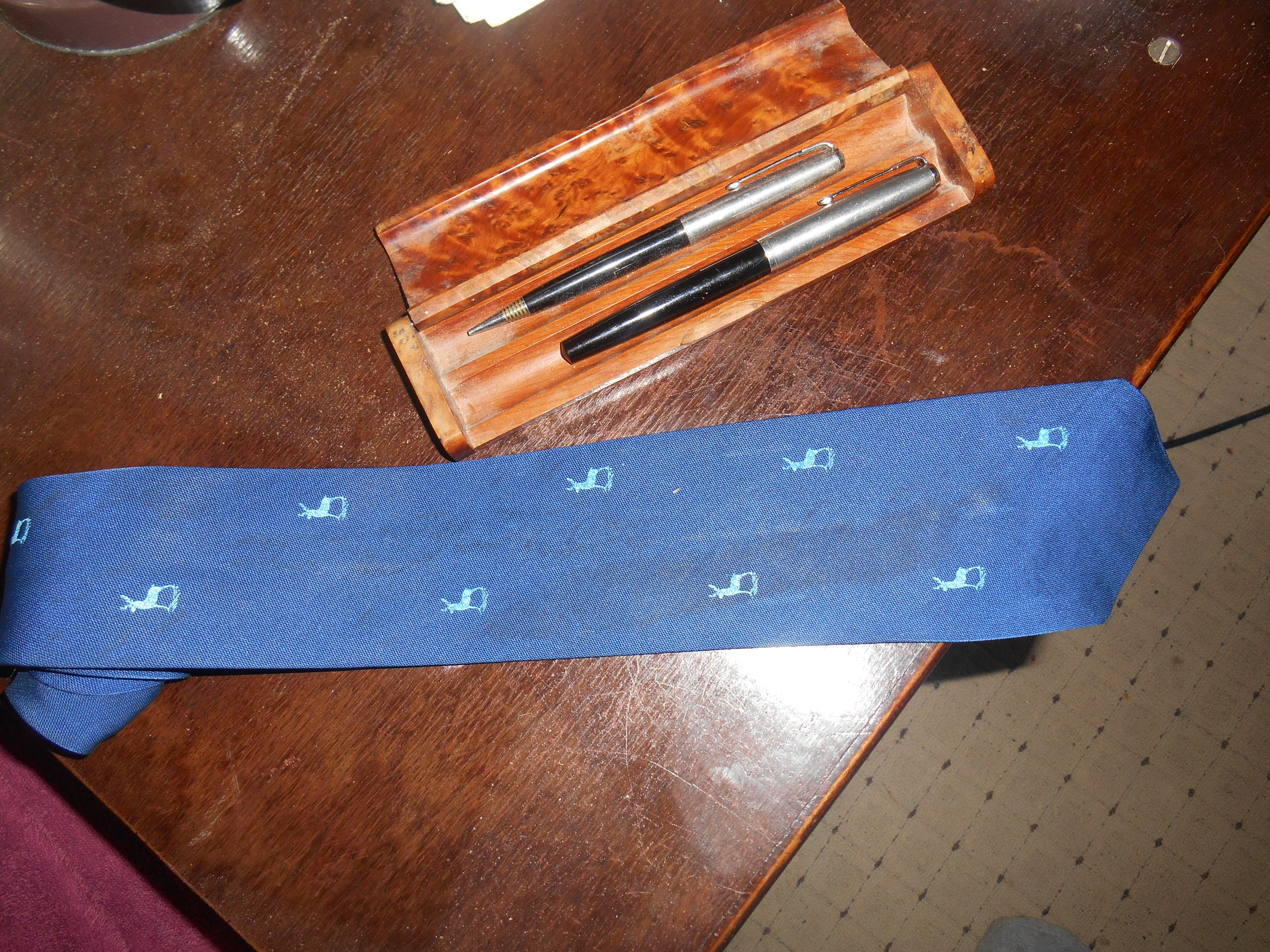
- An old school tie from 1986

Location
- Shephall Green; Stevenage, Hertfordshire, SG2 9XT; England

Information
- Closed: 2012
- Local authority: Hertfordshire
- Specialist: Engineering College
- Department for Education URN: 117517 Tables
- Ofsted: Reports
- Gender: Coeducational
- Age: 11 to 18
- Website: http://www.heathcote.herts.sch.uk/

The Heathcote School was an 11-18 comprehensive school in Stevenage, Hertfordshire. The school was founded in the 1950s. It was awarded Specialist Engineering College (English specialist school) status. The school was situated in Shephall. Typically in the 1970s, 1980s and 1990s students would leave to work at British Aerospace, GEC Marconi, Ferranti or one of the other large engineering firms based in or around Stevenage. There were usually about 1000 pupils at the school.

It had workshops for metalworking, carpentry, and cookery and science labs, all to encourage both boys and girls in the trade of engineering. In the mid 1980s a computer laboratory was built with around 20 RML480Z computers to encourage the learning of basic computer engineering both in hardware and software.

The school had student government, the school council, which was established in 1969. Two representatives from each tutor group were elected to represent the views of the tutor group in the council meetings.

Form groups were named after famous Roman roads. They were Akeman, Ermine, Fosse, Icknield, Stane, Watling and Dane, which was added in 2002.

In 2007 Hertfordshire County Council issued statutory notice for the closure of The Heathcote School in August 2012. The last intake for year 7 students was in 2008. Keystage 3 students transferred to other local schools in 2010. Keystage 4 students remained at the school until it closed in 2012.
