= Listed buildings in Skelmersdale =

Skelmersdale is a town in the West Lancashire district of Lancashire, England. It contains 21 listed buildings that are recorded in the National Heritage List for England. All the listed buildings are designated at Grade II, the lowest of the three grades, which is applied to "buildings of national importance and special interest". Originally it was an agricultural community, and later was associated with coal mining. Sine the 1960s most of the area has been occupied by a New Town. Almost all the listed buildings are, or originated as, farmhouses or farm buildings. The other listed buildings are a cottage, a church, and a war memorial.

== Buildings ==
| Name and location | Photograph | Date | Notes |
|---|---|---|---|
| Barn, Felton's Farm; 53.55379°N 2.75436°W | — | Late 16th century (probable) | A range of farm buildings in sandstone with a stone-slate roof. It has a rectangular plan with five bays and a stable at the west end. The buildings contain wagon entrances, ventilation slits, doorways, and loading doors. Inside the building are two full cruck trusses. |
| Felton's Farmhouse; 53.55350°N 2.75445°W | — | Late 16th or very early 17th century (probable) | The former farmhouse is basically timber-framed, later clad with sandstone and rendered, and with a 20th-century tile roof. It has two parallel ranges, the front range with two storeys and two bays. There are two 20th-century gabled porches, and the windows are casements. Inside there is exposed timber-framing. |
| Harsnips; 53.55410°N 2.75767°W | — | 1667 | A former farmhouse in sandstone with a composition tile roof. It has a T-shaped plan, with a two-bay main range, and a cross wing to the right. On the front is a gabled porch and a datestone. The windows are casements. Inside the house is a cruck truss. |
| Cicely's Cottage; 53.55513°N 2.76046°W | — | Late 17th century | Originally a small farmhouse, it is in sandstone with a stone-slate roof. There are two storeys and two bays, the right bay being gabled. Some of the windows are mullioned and others are casements, and most have hood moulds. |
| Smith's Farmhouse; 53.55429°N 2.76231°W | — | Late 17th century (probable) | Originally a farmhouse, and later altered, it is in sandstone with composition tile roofs, and is in two storeys. There is a main one-bay range, a two-bay cross wing, and later additions. Some of the windows are mullioned and others are casements. Inside the building is a timber-framed partition containing a Tudor arched doorway. |
| Yew Tree Farmhouse; 53.55511°N 2.75896°W | — | 1679 | The farmhouse was extended in 1710, and has since been divided into two dwellings. It is in sandstone with a stone-slate roof. The house has a U-shaped plan, with a one-bay central range and two-bay cross wings. The central range has 1 1/2 storeys, and the wings have two storeys. The doorway in the centre has a rectangular lintel, above which is a datestone and a gabled half-dormer. Most of the windows are casements. Inside the house are timber-framed partitions. |
| Widdows Farmhouse; 53.55473°N 2.75789°W | — | 1680 | The former farmhouse is in sandstone with a composition tile roof. It has an L-shaped plan, with a three-bay main range and a kitchen wing at the rear. On the front is a 20th-century glazed porch and a 20th-century bow window. The other windows are mullioned. In the left gable wall is a datestone. |
| Websters Farmhouse; 53.56307°N 2.80161°W | | 1682 | The former farmhouse is in brick on a sandstone plinth with a composition tile roof. There are two storeys and four bays. In the second bay is a two-storey gabled porch containing a square-headed doorway, a window, and a datestone. On the front is an elaborate band of brickwork giving an embattled effect. The windows have been altered. |
| Heyes Farmhouse; 53.54331°N 2.75227°W | — | 1685 | A former farmhouse that has been altered and extended, originally with an L-shaped plan. It has a timber-framed core, encased in sandstone, and with a modern tiled roof. Many of the mullioned windows and their hood moulds have been retained. Inside the house there is exposed timber-framing. |
| Barn, Smith's Farm; 53.55463°N 2.76222°W | — | 1689 | The barn, later used for other purposes, is in sandstone with a slate roof. It has an L-shaped plan, with a three-bay range, a west wing, and an outshut. The main range has a wagon entrance and ventilation slits. The west wing is in two storeys, and has a doorway, mullioned windows, a datestone, and external steps leading to a first-floor doorway. Inside the barn are timber-framed partitions. |
| Whiteledge Farmhouse; 53.54403°N 2.77457°W | — | 1693 | The farmhouse is in sandstone with a composition tile roof, in two storeys. It has a T-shaped plan, with a two-bay main range and a short rear wing. In the centre is a 20th-century brick gabled porch, and at the rear is a lean-to porch. In the right gable wall is a datestone. |
| Barn, Widdows Farm; 53.55457°N 2.75816°W | — | Late 17th or early 18th century (probable) | The barn, later used for other purposes, is in sandstone with a stone-slate roof. It has an L-shaped plan, originally with three bays, later an added bay at the south and an outshut at the rear. The building contains opposed wagon entrances, doorways, a loading door, pitching holes, and ventilation slits. |
| The Old Toby Public House; 53.56080°N 2.77657°W | — | 1712 | Originally a farmhouse, expanded in the late 19th century, and used as a public house. It is in sandstone with a composition tile roof, in two storeys, and it has an irregular plan. The original part has a U-shaped plan, it is on a chamfered plinth, and has quoins and a datestone. The extension is in Gothic style, and has a symmetrical three-bay front, with the centre bay recessed and the outer bays gabled. In the centre is a gabled porch, and the wings contain canted bay windows in the ground floor and cross windows above. |
| Beacon View; 53.56301°N 2.76464°W | — | 1713 | Originally a farmhouse, it is in sandstone with a stone-slate roof. There are two storeys and two bays. The doorway has a thin lintel, the windows are square in the ground floor and vertical-rectangular above, and there are gabled half-dormers and a datestone. |
| Stannanaught Farmhouse; 53.55996°N 2.76073°W | — | 1714 | A former farmhouse in sandstone with a stone-slate roof. It has two storeys, and is in an L-shaped plan with a three-bay main range, a cross wing, and an outshut in the angle. The doorway has a moulded and inscribed lintel. Apart from one cross window, the windows are sliding sashes. |
| Yew Tree Cottage; 53.55556°N 2.75907°W | — | Early to mid 18th century | A brick cottage on a sandstone plinth with a stone-slate roof. It has two storeys and two bays, and a 20th-century wooden porch. The windows are sliding sashes. At the rear is a single-storey outshut. |
| Barker's Farmhouse; 53.56153°N 2.76151°W | — | 1742 | The former farmhouse is in sandstone with a stone-slate roof, and has two storeys. It has a cruciform plan, with a two-bay main range, a porch at the front, and a service wing with an outshut to the rear. The entrance front is symmetrical, with a two-storey porch containing a doorway, a window, and a datestone. The windows are casements; the windows and the doorway have rectangular lintels. On the gables are finials. |
| 298 Ormskirk Road; 53.54103°N 2.75294°W | — | Mid 18th century (probable) | Originally a farmhouse and attached stable, later converted into a single dwelling. It is in sandstone with a stone-slate roof, and has two storeys and an attic. There are two doorways with plain surrounds, and the windows contain altered glazing. |
| 286 and 288 Ormskirk Road; 53.54089°N 2.75225°W | — | 1793 | The former farmhouse is in sandstone with a stone-slate roof. There are two storeys and three bays. The doorway has an arched stone head with a keystone. There are three vertical-horizontal window in both floors, all with raised sills and rectangular lintels, and containing 20th-century casements. |
| St Paul's Church; 53.55003°N 2.79233°W | | 1903–04 | The church was designed by Austin and Paley in Perpendicular style with Arts and Crafts features. It is in sandstone with red tile roofs, and consists of a nave with a clerestory and a west baptistry, aisles, a chancel with the stump of a north tower surmounted by a pyramidal roof, and a south vestry. |
| War memorial 53.55135°N 2.80831°W | | c. 1920 | The memorial is in white stone. It has a square pedestal with a moulded cap standing on three square steps. On the pedestal is the statue of a soldier, and on the sides of the pedestal are the names of the fallen in both World Wars. |
