= Chelmer Valley High School =

Location
- Court Road, Broomfield; Chelmsford, Essex, CM1 7ER; England
- Coordinates: 51°46′17″N 0°28′02″E

Information
- Type: Academy
- Department for Education URN: 137260 Tables
- Ofsted: Reports
- HeadTeacher: Tom Sparks
- Gender: co-educational
- Age: 11 to 18
- Enrolment: 1692
- Houses: C, H, E, L, M, R, V
- Website: www.chelmervalleyhighschool.co.uk

Chelmer Valley High School (CVHS) is an academy based on a large site on the outskirts of Chelmsford, Essex, England. It has specialisms in engineering, and is assessed as one of the best performing comprehensive schools in Essex; it was given an "outstanding" rating by Ofsted in 2007, and as "good" in 2013. The school also received an Ofsted rating of "good" in 2017.

The school has a number of blocks (Old, New, Tech, Richardson, Eastman and Sixth Form) providing many classrooms, offices and study spaces for students and staff.

== Finances ==
Extra funding resulting from the school's Engineering College status has allowed developments in the technology and science departments. The school spent £25,000 on a new fitness suite. Due to the closure of St Peters College in August 2011, Chelmer Valley has stepped in to take in a larger number of students, resulting in a large amount of money being added to the schools fund. The school is currently expanding to make room for the increased number of students.

== Inspections ==
From the September 2007 inspection, Ofsted rated the school as "outstanding", the highest award available. Ofsted said "Chelmer Valley is a vibrant and dynamic school that has not stood still since the last inspection. The school judges its effectiveness to be good but, because so much of its work is exemplary, inspectors judge it to be outstanding ... the school is justifiably regarded as a highly successful specialist college in engineering. It has excellent provision for design and technology, mathematics and the sciences and is exceptionally successful in embedding the positive influence of engineering in the wider curriculum."

== Developments ==
The school converted to academy status in August 2011, but continues to have engineering as a specialism.

The Eastman building for drama and music officially opened on 11 May 2012.

This follows on from the October 2004 inspection that put the school in the top 10% in the country.

== Blue Falcons Gymnastic Display Team ==
The Blue Falcons Gymnastic Display Team was founded in 1974 and is based at Chelmer Valley High School. The team is composed of current and former students of the school. The Chelmsford Royal Navy and Royal Marines careers office support the team and arranged in July 2005 for the Royal Navy to kit them out. The Blue Falcons appear throughout the year at a variety of fêtes, carnivals, military tattoos, and fun days. They appeared at Wembley Stadium in 1991 as part of the BBC’s Children in Need Appeal and have made numerous other appearances on both local and national television. In 1995 the Blue Falcons became the first school gymnastic display team to appear at the Royal Tournament. They performed in front of the Duchess of Kent and 10,000 spectators. The performances were so successful that they were repeated in 1996 and 1997. They appeared at the Colchester Military Festival in 2006 and the Burnham Carnival in 2007.

On 2 December 1999, a team of ten gymnasts from the Blue Falcons completed a world record 4,095 vaults in one hour, thus earning themselves a place in the Guinness Book of Records. Four years later, in September 2003, the Blue Falcons held a sponsored World Record Event at the Meadows Shopping Centre in Chelmsford, with two teams aiming to beat their own World Record for the most vaults in one hour. Both teams succeeded in breaking the original record with 4,575 and 5,685 vaults respectively, and the team once again became the official Guinness World Record Holders. On 28 April 2007 the team completed 128,506 vaults in 12 hours to raise money for charity.
