= Faringdon Community College =

Coordinates: 51.6483°N 1.5905°W

Location
- Fernham Road; Faringdon, Oxfordshire, SN7 7LB; England

Information
- Type: Academy
- Department for Education URN: 137993 Tables
- Ofsted: Reports
- Headteacher: Lisa Barker
- Gender: Coeducational
- Age: 11 to 18
- Enrolment: 1090
- Capacity: 1126
- Website: www.fccoxon.co.uk

Faringdon Community College is an 11 to 18 mixed comprehensive school on the edge of Faringdon, a market town in Oxfordshire, England. The college has a specialist status in Engineering.

Tollington Secondary Modern School moved to the present site in Fernham Road in 1962, and was renamed Faringdon Community College in 2003. In 2012 it became part of the Faringdon Academy of Schools multi-academy trust, with Faringdon Infant School and Faringdon Junior School.
