= Melissa-Jane Daniel =

British archer

Melissa-Jane Daniel (born 19 August 1988) is a British archer.

Daniel, born in Preston, Lancashire, is a member of the Bowmen of Skelmersdale and has been a participant in the sport of archery since the age of six. She currently holds seven Regional (Lancashire) Records, along with four National Records in Clout Archery, five National Records in Flight archery and 5 National Records in Target archery.

She also holds five World Records in Flight Archery, two of which were claimed on her 18th Birthday at the National Flight Championships held at RAF Church Fenton on 19 August 2006.
