= Lathom High School =

Location
- Glenburn Road; Skelmersdale; Lancashire, WN8 6JN; England; 53.56125°N 2.79215°W

Information
- Type: Foundation school
- Established: September 1988
- Local authority: Lancashire
- Specialist: Technology
- Department for Education URN: 119774 Tables
- Ofsted: Reports
- Headteacher: Paul Livesley
- Gender: Coeducational
- Age: 11 to 16
- Enrolment: 599 as of January 2023
- Website: http://lathomhighschool.org/

Lathom High School is a coeducational secondary school and specialist technology college located in Skelmersdale in the English county of Lancashire. Following an amalgamation of two former schools Tawd Vale and West Bank High, Lathom High was officially opened in November 1988 by Jack Straw MP.

It is a foundation school administered by Lancashire County Council. The school offers GCSEs, OCR Nationals and NVQs as programmes of study for pupils.

== History ==
Lathom High School was founded in September 1988 following the closure of Tawd Vale High School in August 1988, at which point the school was renamed as Lathom High School, residing on the same site. The decision to close the former schools was made in November 1986 by Lancashire's District Education Liaison Committee, in a move that was expected to anger parents, particularly those closer to Ormskirk. Headteacher of Tawd Vale, Geoff Burnett, presented his own case study which suggested that it was not viable to have three county secondary schools in Skelmerdale, noting that teachers at both schools had accepted the idea of a merger. It was recommended that further protection was needed by way of restricting the intake of schools in Ormskirk and Up Holland to a five-form entry of 150 pupils, down from 180.

The new school opened following the merger between Tawd Vale and West Bank High School, with the amalgamation approved in February 1988 by Education Secretary Kenneth Baker due to falling pupil numbers across both schools. Prior to opening, improvement works totalling £250,000 were carried out. The naming of the school was approved by the governing body in March 1988. The official opening took place on 10 November 1988 by Jack Straw MP, then Shadow Secretary of State for Education.

== Notable alumni ==
- Ian Armstrong, former Port Vale footballer
