= Ashley Dalton =

British Labour politician (born 1972)

Ashley Dalton MP
- Official portrait, 2026

Parliamentary Under-Secretary of State for Public Health and Prevention
- In office 10 February 2025 – 2 March 2026
- Prime Minister: Keir Starmer
- Preceded by: Andrew Gwynne
- Succeeded by: Sharon Hodgson

Member of Parliament for West Lancashire
- Incumbent
- Assumed office 9 February 2023
- Preceded by: Rosie Cooper
- Majority: 13,625 (30.8%)
Shadow portfolios
2023–2024	Women and Equalities

Personal details
- Born: Ruth Ashley Charman Dalton; 15 August 1972 (age 54) Leyland, Lancashire, England
- Party: Labour
- Education: Middlesex University (BA)
- Website: www.ashleydalton.uk

Ruth Ashley Charman Dalton (born 15 August 1972) is a British politician and former community worker who has served as Member of Parliament (MP) for West Lancashire since the 2023 West Lancashire by-election, succeeding Rosie Cooper. A member of the Labour Party, she was Parliamentary Under-Secretary of State for Public Health and Prevention from February 2025 to March 2026.

== Early life, education and career ==
Ruth Ashley Charman Dalton was born on 15 August 1972. She was adopted as a baby and raised in Leyland, Lancashire. Her father worked at Leyland Motors, later becoming a nurseryman, and her mother worked for the NHS.

She became aware of the Labour Party at the age of 14, when a customer ordered 40 red rose buttonholes for a by-election count from her father's florist's shop, and joined the party while at university.

She attended All Hallows Catholic High School in Penwortham (1983–1988) and Preston College (1989–1991), and obtained a BA in English and politics (1996) and a DipHE in professional development (voluntary sector) (1997) from Middlesex University.

Dalton worked for Southend-on-Sea Council for 17 years, and at the time of her selection as a parliamentary candidate she worked part-time for a Lancashire charity.

== Political career ==
Dalton was Labour's candidate in Rochford and Southend East in the 2017 and 2019 general elections. She was selected on 9 October 2022 as Labour's candidate in the West Lancashire by-election. The by-election was triggered by the resignation of Rosie Cooper. Dalton was elected MP with 14,068 votes (62.3%). In her victory speech, Dalton called for a general election and action on the cost of living crisis. She committed to campaign for a children's nighttime accident and emergency service in Ormskirk and a railway station in Skelmersdale.

Dalton took her oath of office on Monday 20 February. She signed an early day motion welcoming the investigation into the 2022 UEFA Champions League final chaos on the same day. She was a guest at the coronation of Charles III and Camilla.

In the House of Commons she was Shadow Minister for Women and Equalities on the Opposition frontbench of Keir Starmer until July 2024. On 10 February 2025, Dalton was appointed Parliamentary Under-Secretary of State for Public Health and Prevention in the Department of Health and Social Care. This followed the dismissal of Andrew Gwynne who had held the post from 9 July 2024 to 8 February 2025. On 2 March 2026, Dalton resigned her position as Health Minister to concentrate on her constituency work while she underwent chemotherapy for cancer. On 2 November 2026 Dalton was appointed at the government's "Cancer Adviser", a non-Ministerial role which would see Dalton work with Health Minister James Frith on the delivery of the government's National Cancer Plan.

== Personal life ==
Dalton is a survivor of breast cancer; after surgery, chemotherapy and radiotherapy in 2014 she had further surgery in 2024. She unsuccessfully sued Southend Hospital for failing to diagnose her with cancer in 2011. She was diagnosed with metastatic breast cancer in 2025.

She is a parent and a carer. Her ex-husband died of kidney cancer. She is a gay woman and a member of LGBT+ Labour.

Parliament of the United Kingdom
Preceded by Rosie Cooper	Member of Parliament for West Lancashire; 2023–	Incumbent
