= Rosie Cooper =

British politician (born 1950)

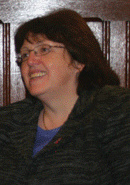
- Cooper in 2012

Chair of Mersey Care NHS Foundation Trust
- Incumbent
- Assumed office 30 November 2022
- Preceded by: Beatrice Fraenkel

Member of Parliament for West Lancashire
- In office 5 May 2005 – 30 November 2022
- Preceded by: Colin Pickthall
- Succeeded by: Ashley Dalton

Lord Mayor of Liverpool
- In office 1992–1993
- Preceded by: Trevor Smith
- Succeeded by: Michael Black

Member of the Liverpool City Council
- In office 1973–2000
- Constituency: Broadgreen (1973–1996); Allerton (1996–2000)

Personal details
- Born: Rosemary Elizabeth Cooper; 5 September 1950 (age 75) Liverpool, England
- Party: Labour (1999–present)
- Other political affiliations: Liberal Democrats (1988–1999); Liberal (until 1988)
- Education: University of Liverpool
- Website: Official website

Rosemary Elizabeth Cooper (born 5 September 1950) is a British health official and former politician. Cooper was a Liberal and later Liberal Democrat member of the Liverpool City Council from 1973 until 1999, when she joined the Labour Party. After leaving the council the following year, she was the Labour Member of Parliament (MP) for West Lancashire from 2005 until her resignation in 2022, when she was named chair of the Mersey Care NHS Foundation Trust. In 2018, she was the target of a plot to murder her involving Jack Renshaw.

== Early life and career ==
Cooper was born in Liverpool, the daughter of deaf parents. She was educated at St Oswald's Roman Catholic Primary School, Old Swan, Bellerive Convent Grammar School, and the University of Liverpool.

Cooper originally worked for a company called W. Cooper Ltd from 1973 to 1980, before joining Littlewoods initially as a buyer when, in 1994, she became the public relations manager and then, in 1995, the group corporate communications manager. She became a project coordinator in 1999, before she left Littlewoods in 2001, when she was appointed director at the Merseyside Centre for the Deaf.

She was a member of the Liverpool Health Authority and held the position of vice chair between 1994 and 1996. In 1996, she became chair of Liverpool Women's Hospital.

She has also acted as a trustee of the Roy Castle Lung Cancer Foundation.

== Liberal Democrats to Labour ==
Cooper was elected, aged 22, to the Liverpool City Council as a Liberal councillor in 1973 and, in 1992, became the Lord Mayor of Liverpool. She remained on the council until 2000.

She fought her first Westminster campaign at the 1983 general election when she was selected to contest the Conservative-held seat of Liverpool Garston as a Liberal. She finished in third place, more than 14,000 votes behind the winner, Labour's Eddie Loyden.

Next, Cooper contested the 1986 Knowsley North by-election, caused by the resignation of the Labour MP Robert Kilroy-Silk to become a television presenter. At the by-election, Labour retained the seat with George Howarth gaining a comfortable margin of 6,724 votes; when Cooper contested the seat again a few months later at the 1987 general election she finished 21,098 votes behind Howarth.

At the 1992 general election, now a Liberal Democrat, she was back in her native Liverpool, coming second at Liverpool Broadgreen 7,027 votes behind Labour's Jane Kennedy, but ahead of the former deselected Labour MP Terry Fields.

From 1973 to 1996, Cooper was councillor for the Broadgreen ward. From 1996 to 2000, Cooper represented the Allerton ward, before in 1999 she switched to the Labour Party, becoming a partymate to former general election opponents Loyden, Howarth and Kennedy, and stood in the Netherley ward in 2000, though she did not win and left the council that year. She contested the European Parliament elections in 2004 for Labour in the North West.

== Parliamentary career ==
Cooper became the Labour Party's candidate from an all-female short list, in the constituency of West Lancashire at the 2005 general election, following the retirement of the sitting MP Colin Pickthall. Cooper was first elected to the House of Commons at her fifth attempt and third party with a majority of 6,084. She made her maiden speech on 24 May 2005. In September 2005, Cooper, as part of the Labour Friends of Israel, made an official research visit to Israel. In September 2020, she was appointed a vice-chair of Labour Friends of Israel.

Following her election in 2005, she became a member of the Northern Ireland Affairs Committee, and was part of the successful campaign that stopped the merger of the Southport and Ormskirk hospitals. In June 2006, she became parliamentary private secretary to Lord Rooker, a Minister at the Department for Environment, Food and Rural Affairs.

On 9 August 2006, The Daily Telegraph wrote that Cooper had written to the Prime Minister's office reporting the viewpoint of some of her constituents expressed to her, that they would be appalled if Baroness Thatcher were to be given a state funeral, as a leader more politically divisive than others of the late twentieth century.

In 2007, she became parliamentary private secretary to Ben Bradshaw, initially when he was Minister of State in the Department of Health until 2009, when she remained his PPS when he was made Secretary of State for Culture, Media and Sport. She is a member of the All-Party Parliamentary Health Select Committee.

In February 2013, Cooper voted against the second reading of the Marriage (Same Sex Couples) Act 2013. Subsequently, in May 2013, the MP voted against the bill’s third and final reading, opposing the legalisation of same-sex marriage within England and Wales.

On 26 October 2017, a 31-year-old man, Christopher Lythgoe, associated with the proscribed neo-Nazi terror group National Action, was charged with encouragement to murder Cooper, and was also charged along with six other men with being members of a proscribed organisation, contrary to section 11 of the Terrorism Act 2000. On 12 June 2018, Jack Renshaw, 23, of Skelmersdale, Lancashire, admitted in a guilty plea to buying a 48 cm (19 in) replica Roman Gladius sword (often wrongly referred to in the media as a machete) to kill Rosie Cooper the previous summer. In July 2018, Lythgoe was jailed for eight years for being a member of the group and his part in the plot to murder Cooper.

Cooper was re-elected at the 2019 general election with a reduced majority.

In 2020, Cooper called for the Nursing and Midwifery Council to be "replaced with a body which can instil confidence" after a nurse, who was found guilty of bullying, was only handed a 12-month suspension.

Cooper supported Lisa Nandy in the 2020 Labour leadership election.

In June 2021, Cooper introduced a private members' bill which would give British Sign Language legal recognition and enhance its use in public services. The bill was backed by the government in January 2022.

=== Resignation ===
In September 2022, Cooper announced she accepted a new role as chair of Mersey Care NHS Foundation Trust and would resign as MP for West Lancashire triggering a by-election. She would be the first woman MP to vacate a seat for an actual paid office under the Crown and the first MP to do so since 1981, when Warrington's Thomas Williams was appointed a circuit judge.

In November, The Times reported that Cooper was delaying her resignation in order to secure a peerage, which prompted criticism from several figures such as Adrian Owens, leader of the Our West Lancashire party and former Conservative rival to Cooper in the 2010 general election who suggested that she was "inexcusably" absent from key votes in Parliament.

Cooper was appointed Crown Steward and Bailiff of the Chiltern Hundreds on 30 November and formally succeeded Beatrice Fraenkel as chair of Mersey Care NHS Foundation Trust, stating that "representing West Lancashire in Parliament has been the greatest honour of my lifetime".

Parliament of the United Kingdom
Preceded by Colin Pickthall	Member of Parliament for West Lancashire; 2005–2022	Succeeded by Ashley Dalton
