= Ken Hind =

British barrister and politician

Ken Hind CBE

Member of Parliament for West Lancashire
- In office 9 June 1983 – 16 March 1992
- Preceded by: Constituency established
- Succeeded by: Colin Pickthall

Personal details
- Born: Kenneth Harvand Hind; 15 September 1949 (age 77)
- Party: Conservative
- Spouse: Sue Hind (m. 2008)
- Education: University of Leeds

Kenneth Harvand Hind CBE (born 15 September 1949) is a former British politician who was the Conservative Member of Parliament for West Lancashire from 1983 until 1992, when he was defeated by Labour's Colin Pickthall. In May 1997, he was a candidate in the general election for the constituency of Selby, but was defeated by John Grogan.

== Early life and university ==
Ken Hind was born on 15 September 1949, and educated at Woodhouse Grove School and the University of Leeds, where he was Editor of the student newspaper, Union News, Treasurer and Chairman of the Entertainments Committee and later President of the Student Union. He helped to drive the merger of the University and Polytechnic newspapers to create Leeds Student.

In this period, Hind, working with Simon Brogan, Entertainments Secretary, promoted concerts for The Rolling Stones, Led Zeppelin, Elton John, Eric Clapton, Leonard Cohen, John Mayall & the Blues Breakers, Black Sabbath, Ginger Baker and many others at Leeds University. In 1971 The Who recorded the live album, ‘’the Who live at Leeds’’ which became the best selling album in the world in 1972. Andy Kershaw subsequently stated, "Leeds University managed to get The Who to perform simply because the students who were running the gigs there at the time, Simon Brogan and Ken Hind (who later became a Tory MP), had a reputation for doing a highly professional job. Most student unions were amateur. Leeds was different."

As a journalist Hind worked for the Wakefield Express.

== Legal career ==
Hind graduated in Law, with an LLB degree, in 1971 and then qualified as a barrister at Gray's Inn in 1973. Hind served his pupillage under John Hampton at Park Square Chambers in Leeds where he became a tenant until elected to Parliament in 1983. In 1992 he joined 2, Kings Bench Walk Chambers King's Bench Walk and in 1997 - 3, Temple Gardens, Inner Temple, remaining as a door tenant but left in 2000 to join Winkley Square Chambers in Preston. In 2007 Hind left to join Oriel Chambers and in 2013 set up one of the first internet sets of chambers, Newton Chambers. During his period of practice he built a reputation as a fighter of trials. Hind retired from the bar in 2017. During his period of practice he defended in cases in 26 court centres and frequently appeared in the Court of Appeal. In legal practise Hind specialised in organised crime, murder, drugs, and sex cases. He defended in Triad Moss Side and Salford gang cases.

=== Notable cases ===
==== Regina Versus Donna Cannon ====
R V Donna Cannon Winchester Crown Court 1993 brothel owner acquitted of perverting the course of justice but convicted of blackmail. Main prosecution witness prosecution fail to disclose is a drug dealer on witness protection programme. Paul Foot of Private Eye championed case which went to Court of Appeal.

==== Regina Versus Anthony Ian Jackson ====
R V Anthony Ian Jackson Preston Crown Court 2005 Drug Supply by proprietor of All Night Club Monroes Acquitted in 8 minutes by Jury of all charges following a 40-day trial.A nightclub owner accused of allowing drugs to be supplied on his premises has denied he knew what was going on. Anthony Ian Jackson said there was no truth whatsoever in any suggestions that he turned a blind eye to any dealing at Monroes in Great Harwood.

==== Regina Versus Graham Redford ====
R v Graham Redford 2006 – Manchester Crown Court - Alleged Noonan Gang armourer, charged with murder of another gang member shot in the back of the head and body put in car which was the set on fire. A police informer who shot a petty crook to death in a gangland-style execution was trapped by a spelling mistake. Redford, who once ran a private detective agency, also posed as Mr Lloyd and used his mobile phone to send text messages to his girlfriend and another woman in a bid to convince them he was still alive. But instead of saying "I'm" in the texts Redford spelled it "Ime" and detectives investigating the murder discovered that was the way Redford - unlike the victim - always spelled it. Redford was jailed for life and told he must serve at least 30 years - less the time he has spent in custody - before he can be considered for release.

==== Regina Versus Peter Newton ====
R V Peter Newton Multi million £ fraud on Cumbria County Council by a waste disposal firm. The charge stated that they did this by "inflating the quantities of household waste actually collected and disposed of and including quantities which had not been collected and disposed of." Those who admitted being involved in the fraud were CAW Ltd's managing director Dave Armer, the firm's general manager Donald Andrew Kershaw, and yard worker Peter Newton. They were all employees of CAW Ltd of Barrow-in-Furness, which ran seven Cumbria county council civic amenity sites. The firm had originally been paid a set fee for processing the waste. But in 2002 the council introduced a new scheme, in which the firm was paid according to how much waste it handled. This allowed the three to oversee a scam in which the amount of waste processed was exaggerated, with false paperwork being drawn up to back up the bogus figures, so they could claim more money than they should have. In many cases records showed that lorries had contained much more waste than they really had; loads were given "multiple tickets" (making it look as if several lorries had arrived, not just one) and in some cases records were submitted for loads that hadn't existed at all. Transport Manager Peter Newton was jailed for six months.

==== Regina Versus John Varey ====
R V John Varey 2009 Teesside Crown Court charges with 4 others with aggravated burglary, wearing stocking masks and armed. A defence witness who saw attackers leaving the premises was killed in a car accident before the trial- Judge allowed her emergency telephone call to the police in which she made from a passing bus describing what happened to be played to the jury. This evidence of a witness speaking after death, resulted in the acquittal of all 5 defendants.

==== Regina Versus Saim Mahmood ====
R V Saima Mahmood Preston Crown Court 2011. Honour Poisoning and by family of daughter who left home to live with another man, defendant acquitted. The Case featured in BBC programme on honour cases.

==== Regina Versus David Evans ====
R V Evans 2011 Preston Crown Court- Armed robbery of security Van driver shot – discovered by dye on stolen currency notes. This is the trial of the gang had been involved in robberies of security guards making deliveries to cash machines. David Evans along with other gang members was convicted of conspiracy to commit robbery and possessing a firearm and jailed for 10 years.

==== Regina Versus Swaley Wilsher ====
R V Swaley Wilsher 2011- Lincoln Crown Court Armed Robbery of isolated farm – telephone evidence helped to clear the defendant – acquitted - Crimewatch Most Wanted Case- BBC

==== Regina Versus Emma Mitchell ====
R V Emma Mitchell- Preston Crown Court 2013.- Case went to Court of appeal as one of jurors was a Facebook friend of people involved in the case.

==== Regina Versus Simmon Grayson ====
R V Simmon Grayson 2014 -. Preston Crown Court rape of former girlfriend 2 trials, jury in first trial could not agree. Simmon Grayson had claimed that what took place between him and the victim had been consensual but today he starts his sentence after being found guilty of rape and sexual assault. Hind his barrister told Preston Crown Court that Grayson had committed no sexual offences in the past. And it was the first time he had ever been sent to prison. Grayson was given eight years for the rape, two years prison for the sexual assault and another 12 months on top for an offence of intimidation.

==== Regina Versus Mary Kidson ====
R V Mary Kidson 2014 Worcester Crown Court -defendant accused poisoning her child by allegedly administering illegally obtained prescriptive drugs to her daughter who was removed from her care by social services. Defendant was acquitted by direction of Judge at end of prosecution.

==== Regina Versus Rebecca Tootle ====
R V Rebecca Tootle; 2014 -Preston Crown Court charged with murder issue was the right of a defendant attacked at her own home to use force. Acquitted of murder convicted of manslaughter.

==== Regina Versus Abid Khan ====
R V Abid Khan 2015-16 – Manchester Crown Court - Rochdale Grooming Case charged along with a number of other men with sexual assault and rape upon vulnerable girls under the age of 16. Abid Khan, 38, of Liverpool, was found guilty of sexual activity with a child.

== Member of Parliament (1983-1992) ==
Hind made his maiden speech in parliament on 4 November 1983. He was Secretary of the Society of Conservative Lawyers Committee and Secretary of the All-Party Parliamentary Pro-Life Group of MPs.

In 1986 Hind was appointed Parliamentary Private Secretary to the Minister responsible for Defence Procurement, David Trefgarne where he monitored Labour's policy on nuclear disarmament.

In 1987 after the general election, Hind was appointed PPS to the Minister for Small Businesses John Cope in the Department of Employment and was involved in the creation of Training and Enterprise Councils, trade union and employment legislation and abolition of the National Dock Labour Scheme.

Hind rebelled against the Government over sentencing policy in 1988, stating that sentences should be able to be appealed if the prosecution on behalf of the victims believed they were too light. He strongly supporting Margaret Thatcher's proposal to enter the Single Market and the government's privatisation programme.

In 1988 Hind became PPS to the Minister for Minister of State for Security and Finance at the Northern Ireland Office, then John Cope and between 1989 and 1992 then PPS to Peter Brooke, Secretary of State for Northern Ireland. Under the Anglo-Irish Agreement Hind was Chairman of the Joint Anglo-Irish Committee on Environment and Education and a member of the Joint Anglo- Irish Agreement Parliamentary Committee.

In February 1988, Hind presented a Private Member's Bill to control embryo research and invited along with a Parliamentary British delegation to an audience with the Pope. In a debate in the House of Commons on 4 February 1988 Hind introduced the Bill stating that a Department of Health & Social Security Report identified the fact that, "there are deep feelings inside and outside the House over the sensitive issue of embryo research."

During his service in the House of Commons he served on standing committees on criminal justice, employment, media, small business, local government, prevention of terrorism, armed forces and health.

Hind was MP candidates friend in 1990 to Colette Jones Northern Ireland Conservative in the Upper Bann By-election, the first contested by the Conservatives since 1945 and the first time since the "Equal Citizenship" campaign had sought to get the major UK parties to organise in the province. 1990 Upper Bann by-election Jones received 1,038 Votes. Ulster Unionist Party candidate David Trimble is now a Conservative Peer.

In December 1991, along with David Shaw MP for Dover, he used the privilege of the House of Commons in a debate on Pension Funds to introduce evidence of irregularities in the Pension Funds under the control of the late Robert Maxwell, owner of the Daily Mirror, into the public arena.

Hind led adjournment debates on the need for a New Ormskirk Hospital, with the North Western regional health authority granting £25 million in 1990 to build a new hospital, he also introduced private members bills from behind the Chair on phoenix companies and protection of employees in redundancy.

Hind fought to prevent Pilkingtons PLC being taken over by BTR from Birmingham who described themselves as a ’rust bucket operation’. After the takeover was referred to the Monopolies and Mergers Commission employees at Lathom research centre presented Hind with a glass bucket engraved "Our bucket wont rust". The decision was taken by the Government to refer the attempted takeover to the Monopolies and Merger Commission which ruled it was not in the public interest for the takeover to take place.

Hind took part in a discussion on the Granada TV programme Upfront on so called Acid House parties arguing in favour of bringing them under the existing licensing legislation. He sponsored the Entertainments (Increased Penalties) Bill 1990.

== Post-Parliamentary activities ==
After leaving the House of Commons Hind returned to legal practise in London chambers joining 2 Kings Bench Walk. In a BBC Radio 4 Documentary "What does life hold for ex-MPs?" Hind recalled how resuming his career as a criminal barrister was a struggle, recounting, "There was a very solid group of people who really didn't think you were sufficiently professional. They didn't trust you, didn't think you were serious about doing the job because you were an ex-MP."

=== Conservative Party activities ===
In 1992 Hind was appointed by Norman Fowler Norman Fowler, Baron Fowler then Chairman of the Conservative Party to organise and lead a team of barristers and solicitors to represent the Conservative Party in public enquiries into Parliamentary Boundaries. Amongst a number of public enquiries he dealt with Birmingham, Merton Bedfordshire, Cumbria and helped to prepare many more.

In 2019 Ken Hind was appointed as an independent Chairman of the Football Association Safeguarding Appeals Panel and a trustee of the Primrose Community Nature Trust.

When the Conservative Candidates Association was formed in 1993 he became one of its officers and then Chairman in 1997. During his term of office along with a team he helped to create training programmes and training weekends for Conservative Parliamentary candidates.

Between 2006 and 2009 he became Chairman of the Ribble Valley Conservative Association, 2009-2012 Senior Vice Chairman and the Convenor for Longridge until 2017 when he became Campaign Co-ordinator and Election Agent. He was a 3 term councillor, representing the Dilworth ward of Ribble Valley Borough Council for the Conservative Party. In 2013 he was vice Chairman for Housing and Health and between 2015 and 2017 - Chairman of the Accounts and Audit Committee.

In the EU referendum Hind was one of the organisers of the Remain Campaign in Lancashire and in the 2015 and 2017 general elections was the campaign organiser in the Hyndburn Constituency for Conservative candidate Kevin Horkin.

Ken Hind was the Leader of Ribble Valley Borough Council until December 2018 when he resigned.

In 2019 he led and organised the local government elections in the Ribble Valley Constituency for 59 candidates 40 of whom were elected.

==== Leader of Ribble Valley Borough Council ====
During the term of Hind's leadership the Council governance was refocused to drive the local economy to increase income from business rates and create jobs. The management structure was reorganised to create a new unified planning department and economic development department and a new Director was recruited to lead and drive this new department. To facilitate this the Council set up an Economic Development Committee and initiated a development plan for the Borough covering town centres, new commercial estates, job creation, transport links, attraction of new businesses further development of Holmes Mill Clitheroe, working with local industry and encouraging tourism. Hind said the site is a 'fine example' to others across the country. He said, "In many respects it is a model that can be shown as a beacon to local authorities across the country.” "It's part of the heritage of the area." "The conversion from derelict mill to a bar, beer hall, swimming pool restaurants, hotel and offices is a fine example of what can be done with investment."

The 5 year review of the Borough Planning Policy was put in train with a view to reduce the number of homes built in the Borough in line with the governments proposed formula from 280 to between 172 and 200 with the submission of the Development Plan Document which was sent to the Planning Inspector for inspection and final decision. The Council voted to protect the integrity of the Ribble Valley Borough by refusing to be part of the Lancashire Combined Authority.

It voted to become Dementia Friendly and provide facilities for the Lancashire Foundation for Ribble Valley Families to help encourage and protect vulnerable children. During his time as Leader of the Council Ken Hind, was deputy Chairman of the Lancashire District and Boroughs Leaders Group, Director of Lancashire Enterprise Partnership and member of the Police and Crime Commissioners panel.

===== Save Longridge Campaign =====
In the 12 years Ken Hind represented Dilworth he supported the Save Longridge Campaign argued against a number of planning applications and against excessive development of housing At the time Hind stated, "Currently there are about 3,000 households here, but if all the developments applied for are approved – over 1,000 houses in Longridge, plus 503 on the Preston side a stone’s throw from the town centre – that’s potentially a 50pc increase." Hind also called for greater co-operation with the bordering City of Preston over planning policy. Hind believed that ultimately the inability of Planning Authorities to appeal the decisions of Planning Inspectors was what was responsible for the Ribble Valley being "under siege" from developers. As he stated at the time, "Unelected inspectors in planning appeals interpret the National Planning Policy Framework without the right of appeal to the courts to check if their conclusions are correct. Planning departments like ours locally are under huge pressure and have to interpret planning law in the light of day-to-day changes. You only ever destroy a green field once. It’s a precious commodity which can never be replaced." In 2010 he initiated the creation of Longridge Town Team to encourage commercial development. This included support to expand one of the major employers in Longridge, Singletons cheese manufacturers. He encouraged the Town Council to create a Neighbourhood Plan which was successfully approved in 2018 and supported and pressed through the Council preservation of the Longridge recreation ground by deed in trust, to preserve this communal space for future generations. Along with the Longridge Councillors Hind supported the demolition of part of a dilapidated mill to allow Singletons cheese manufacturer, one of the largest employers in Longridge to expand on their existing site and not relocate outside the Borough. Hind also pressed with other councillors with Lancashire County Council for the preservation of the Longridge youth centre in Berry Lane which now remains open and improvement of youth services in the town. As RVBC representative to the Longridge Social Enterprise Company he supported the project driven by Rupert Swarbrick to renovate the old station buildings, now the headquarters of the Town Council, cafe, heritage centre and community facility.

Ken Hind's former ward of Dilworth returned two Conservative councillors.

== Personal life ==
Ken Hind married Sue Hind on 17 March 2008.

== Honors ==
Hind was awarded the CBE Commander of the Order of the British Empire in the Queen's 1995 New Year Honours List for political service.

Parliament of the United Kingdom
New constituency	Member of Parliament for West Lancashire; 1983–1992	Succeeded by Colin Pickthall
