= King's Leadership Academy Hawthornes =

Location
- Fernhill Road; Bootle, Merseyside, L20 6AQ; England; 53°27′45″N 2°58′56″W

Information
- Former name: The Hawthorne's Free School
- Type: Free school
- Motto: Excellence is a habit
- Religious affiliation: Protestant
- Established: 1946
- Trust: Great Schools Trust
- Department for Education URN: 138260 Tables
- Ofsted: Reports
- Headteacher: Andrea St John
- Gender: Coeducational
- Age: 11 to 16
- Enrolment: 637
- Colours: Black & red
- Website: kingshawthornes.com

King's Leadership Academy Hawthornes (formerly The Hawthorne's Free School) is a secondary free school located on Fernhill Road in Bootle, Merseyside, England, about four miles (6.4 km) from Liverpool city centre. The school is in the Metropolitan Borough of Sefton.

The school rebranded in September 2012, on the site of the former St. George of England Specialist Engineering College (previously St George of England High School and St George of England County Secondary School). St George of England Specialist Engineering College closed in 2012, along with St Wilfrid's High School in Litherland. The schools closed due to falling pupil numbers, however parents from both schools campaigned for a new secondary free school to be opened in the area instead.

The schools opening was controversial, as staff from the previous schools were not automatically transferred to the new school, and many lost their jobs. This was despite Sefton Council declaring that staff from the former schools should be subject to the Transfer of Undertakings (Protection of Employment) Regulations 2006, and either be offered continuing employment at the new school or redundancy. The Hawthorne's Free School claimed that as they were a new school, they were not responsible for the staff at the former schools. Staff from the former schools threatened to take their case to the High Court of Justice, however the council has made an offer to pay the staff redundancy in conjunction with the school.

In the summer of 2018, the school re-branded to King's Leadership Academy Hawthornes. The school is now part of the Great Schools Trust.
