= Colin Pickthall =

British politician (1944–2025)

Member of Parliament for West Lancashire
- In office 9 April 1992 – 11 April 2005
- Preceded by: Ken Hind
- Succeeded by: Rosie Cooper

Personal details
- Born: 13 September 1944 Dalton-in-Furness, Cumbria, England
- Died: 27 December 2025 (aged 81) Barrow-in-Furness, Cumbria, England
- Party: Labour
- Spouse: Judith Ann (m. 1973)
- Children: 2
- Education: Lancaster University
- Occupation: Teacher

Colin Pickthall (13 September 1944 – 27 December 2025) was a British Labour Party politician who served as Member of Parliament (MP) for West Lancashire. He was first elected to the House of Commons in 1992, and retired at the general election of 2005.

== Early life ==
Pickthall was born on 13 September 1944 in Dalton-in-Furness, Cumbria. His father was a shipyard fitter. He attended Ulverston Grammar School, and then the University of Wales, Bangor (now Bangor University), obtaining a B.A. Hons. in English Literature and History. He then went on to the University of Lancaster, where he obtained an M.A. with the thesis "The Influence of Socialism on 20th Century British Poetry". He became a member of the Campaign for Nuclear Disarmament, and the Labour Party, in 1963. From 1967 to 1970 he was a teacher at Ruffwood comprehensive school in Kirkby. He then became senior lecturer in English literature at Edge Hill College of Higher Education (now Edge Hill University) in Ormskirk, and was head of European studies there from 1983 until his election to Parliament.

== Political career ==
At the general election in June 1987, Pickthall ran for Parliament in West Lancashire, but lost to the Conservatives by 1,353 votes. Later, in 1989, he won the seat of Ormskirk on Lancashire County Council by a very small margin. However, this was sufficient for the Labour Party to take control of the County Council by one seat.

At the April 1992 general election, he took the parliamentary seat of West Lancashire, and in the following elections, in May 1997 and June 2001, he retained the seat with a substantial majority. He became a member of the Select committee on Agriculture in 1992, the post that he maintained until 1997. He was appointed parliamentary private secretary (PPS) to Alun Michael MP in 1997, later serving Jack Straw MP.

Pickthall resigned as PPS in December 2000 in response to the police investigation into his election expenses. He was reinstated shortly afterwards, in 2001, when the police investigation concluded there had been "no wrongdoing". He was transferred to the Foreign Office in 2001, where he continued as Straw's PPS.

He pledged his "continuing support" for Tony Blair in July 2004, remarking that his performance has been "psychologically remarkable".

Pickthall was considered a leftist, who frequently campaigned on animal welfare and environmental issues. He was opposed to hare coursing, as the Waterloo Cup took place at Great Altcar, in his constituency, and hunting. His support for the hunting ban led to pro-hunt supporters leaving a dead fox on his doorstep in February 2005.

He retired from the House of Commons at the general election of May 2005.

== Personal life and death ==
Pickthall married a Canadian, Judith Ann, in 1973; they had two daughters, Alisoun and Jenny.

He was a supporter of Humanists UK.

Pickthall died at Furness General Hospital on 27 December 2025, at the age of 81.

Parliament of the United Kingdom
Preceded by Ken Hind	Member of Parliament for West Lancashire; 1992–2005	Succeeded by Rosie Cooper
