= West Lancashire College =

Further education college in England

Location
- Skelmersdale Campus, College Way; Skelmersdale, WN8 6DX; 53°33′08.9″N 2°46′46.4″W

Information
- Former names: Skelmersdale and Ormskirk College, Skelmersdale College
- Type: Further education college
- Principal: Christian Thersby
- Parent Institution: NCG

West Lancashire College (formerly Skelmersdale & Ormskirk College) is a further education college based in Skelmersdale, West Lancashire, England. The college is a part of a larger organisation called NCG.

== History ==
Originally known as Skelmersdale & Ormskirk College, the college was originally an independently controlled institution, but was taken over by Newcastle College (now NCG) in 2007.

In August 2011, the college changed its name to West Lancashire College. The following month the college moved to a new £42.8 million campus, based near to its old demolished Northway Campus in Skelmersdale.

== Present ==
The college currently offers a range of courses to students from the local area. These courses include Diplomas, NVQs, Access courses, and as of 2023, T-Levels.

The college campus contains facilities that replicate real life working environments for students to learn in. These specialised business units include hairdressing salons and beauty treatment rooms in The Hair & Beauty Lounge, which is open to the public.

== Campuses ==
- Skelmersdale Campus, College Way, Skelmersdale

The following campuses are no longer in use by the college:

- Westbank Campus, Yewdale, Skelmersdale - Demolished after West Lancashire College relocated to the current Skelmersdale Campus.
- Ormskirk Campus, Hants Lane, Ormskirk - Closed in 2021.
- West Lancashire Construction Academy, Glebe Road, Skelmersdale - Closed after the Construction, Engineering and Logistics building opened on the main Skelmersdale Campus.
