= West Lancashire (constituency) =

UK Parliament constituency (since 1983)

Coordinates: 53.560°N 2.818°W

- County constituency for the House of Commons
- Interactive map of boundaries since 1997
- Location within North West England
- County: Lancashire
- Electorate: 73,652 (March 2020)
- Major settlements: Ormskirk, Skelmersdale and Burscough

Current constituency
- Created: 1983
- Member of Parliament: Ashley Dalton (Labour)
- Seats: One
- Created from: Ormskirk and Ince

West Lancashire is a county constituency represented in the House of Commons of the UK Parliament. Following the resignation of Labour MP Rosie Cooper on 30 November 2022, the seat was won by the party's candidate Ashley Dalton in the by-election held on 9 February 2023. She retained the seat at the July 2024 general election.

== Constituency profile ==
The constituency is located in southern Lancashire, and borders Merseyside to the south and west and Greater Manchester to the east. Skelmersdale is the largest town and is usually strongly supportive of Labour, followed by the more Conservative-inclined areas around Ormskirk and Burscough. The constituency shares its boundaries with the southern part of the borough of West Lancashire, while the northern part of the borough is in the South Ribble constituency.

Farming is a significant industry in the constituency, with much of the farmland classed as grade 1 or grade 2. The entirety of the constituency is within the North West Green Belt. Education is another key employer, with Edge Hill University located in Ormskirk, originally a teacher training college which attained University status in 2006 and now has over 13,000 students.

West Lancashire is home to a significant proportion of those working at managerial and professional levels and an above average retired age quotient. Workless claimants who were registered jobseekers were in November 2012 lower than the national average of 3.8%, at 3.5% of the population based on a statistical compilation by The Guardian.

== Boundaries ==
=== Historic ===
1983–1997: Aughton Park, Aughton Town Green, Bickerstaffe, Birch Green, Burscough, Derby, Digmoor, Downholland, Halsall, Hesketh-with-Becconsall, Knowsley, Lathom, Moorside, Newburgh, North Meols, Rufford, Scarisbrick, Scott, Skelmersdale North, Skelmersdale South, Tanhouse, Tarleton, Upholland North, and Upholland South.

1997–2010: Aughton Park, Aughton Town Green, Bickerstaffe, Birch Green, Burscough, Derby, Digmoor, Downholland, Halsall, Knowsley, Lathom, Moorside, Newburgh, Parbold, Scarisbrick, Scott, Skelmersdale North, Skelmersdale South, Tanhouse, Upholland North, Upholland South, and Wrightington.

2010–2023: Ashurst, Aughton and Downholland, Aughton Park, Bickerstaffe, Birch Green, Burscough East, Burscough West, Derby, Digmoor, Halsall, Knowsley, Moorside, Newburgh, Parbold, Scarisbrick, Scott, Skelmersdale North, Skelmersdale South, Tanhouse, Upholland, and Wrightington.

The constituency boundaries remained unchanged.

=== Current ===
Following a local government boundary review which came into effect in May 2023, the constituency now comprises the following wards or part wards of the Borough of West Lancashire:

- Aughton & Holborn; Burscough Bridge & Rufford (part); Burscough Town; Old Skelmersdale; Ormskirk East; Ormskirk West; Rural North East; Rural South; Rural West; Skelmersdale North; Skelmersdale South; Tanhouse & Skelmersdale Town Centre; Up Holland.

The 2023 review of Westminster constituencies, which was based on the ward structure in place at 1 December 2020, left the boundaries unchanged.

== History ==
The seat was established under the third periodic review of Westminster constituencies of 1983.

The new seat took in parts of Ormskirk and Ince, both abolished in the review. Ince had elected Labour MPs since 1906, but Ormskirk had a mixed and longer history as a more marginal seat. Both seats were represented by Labour MPs when they were abolished.

The seat's first member, Ken Hind, held the seat for two terms as a Conservative, winning the first election in the landslide Conservative result of 1983. In 1992 the seat was won by Colin Pickthall of the Labour Party, who was succeeded by Rosie Cooper in 2005. The 2010 result was more marginal, with a 9.0% majority, but was not within the 50 most narrowly won seats for Cooper's party.

In September 2022 Rosie Cooper announced she had accepted a new role as Chair of Mersey Care NHS Foundation Trust and would therefore resign as MP, triggering a by-election. Her successor Ashley Dalton is a member of the Labour Party who was appointed as Parliamentary Under-Secretary of State for Public Health and Prevention in 2025.

== Members of Parliament ==
Election	Member	Party
1983	Ken Hind	Conservative
1992	Colin Pickthall	Labour
2005	Rosie Cooper	Labour
2023 by-election	Ashley Dalton	Labour

== Elections ==
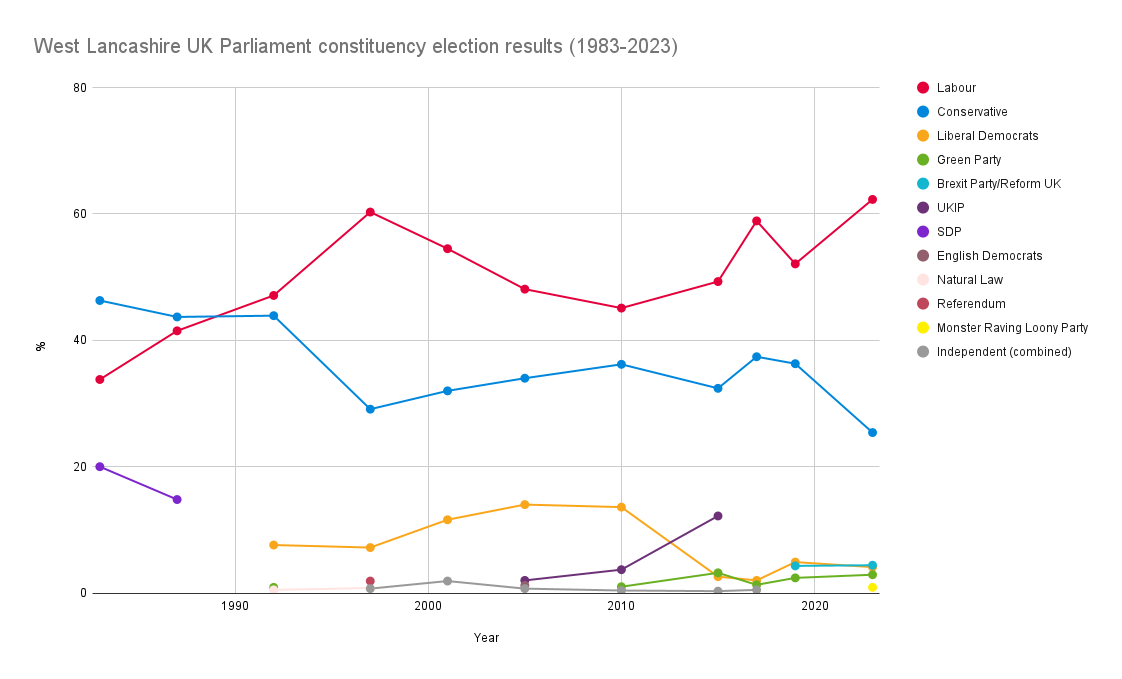
West Lancashire constituency election results from 1983 to 2023

=== Elections in the 2020s ===
General election 2024: West Lancashire
Party	Candidate	Votes	%	±%
Labour	Ashley Dalton	22,305	50.5	−1.6
Conservative	Mike Prendergast	8,680	19.6	−16.7
Reform	Simon Evans	7,909	17.9	+13.6
Green	Charlotte Houltram	3,263	7.4	+5.0
Liberal Democrats	Graham Smith	2,043	4.6	−0.3
Majority		13,625	30.8	+15.2
Turnout		44,200	60.3	−11.7
Registered electors		74,083		
Labour hold		Swing	▲7.5	

By-election 2023: West Lancashire
Party	Candidate	Votes	%	±%
Labour	Ashley Dalton	14,068	62.3	+10.2
Conservative	Mike Prendergast	5,742	25.4	−10.9
Reform	Jonathan Kay	997	4.4	+0.1
Liberal Democrats	Jo Barton	918	4.1	−0.8
Green	Peter Cranie	646	2.8	+0.5
Monster Raving Loony	Howling Laud Hope	210	0.9	New
Majority		8,326	36.9	+21.0
Turnout		22,639	31.4	−40.7
Labour hold		Swing	+10.5	

=== Elections in the 2010s ===
General election 2019: West Lancashire
Party	Candidate	Votes	%	±%
Labour	Rosie Cooper	27,458	52.1	–6.8
Conservative	Jack Gilmore	19,122	36.3	–1.1
Liberal Democrats	Simon Thomson	2,560	4.9	+2.9
Brexit Party	Marc Stanton	2,275	4.3	New
Green	John Puddifer	1,248	2.4	+1.1
Majority		8,336	15.8	–5.7
Turnout		52,663	72.0	–2.4
Labour hold		Swing	–2.9	

General election 2017: West Lancashire
Party	Candidate	Votes	%	±%
Labour	Rosie Cooper	32,030	58.9	+9.6
Conservative	Samuel Currie	20,341	37.4	+5.0
Liberal Democrats	Jo Barton	1,069	2.0	–0.6
Green	Nate Higgins	680	1.3	–1.9
War Veterans Pro-Traditional Family	David Braid	269	0.5	+0.2
Majority		11,689	21.5	+4.6
Turnout		54,103	74.4	+4.4
Labour hold		Swing	+2.3	

General election 2015: West Lancashire
Party	Candidate	Votes	%	±%
Labour	Rosie Cooper	24,474	49.3	+4.2
Conservative	Paul Greenall	16,114	32.4	–3.8
UKIP	Jack Sen^{1}	6,058	12.2	+8.5
Green	Ben Basson	1,582	3.2	+2.2
Liberal Democrats	Daniel Lewis	1,298	2.6	–11.0
Independent	David Braid	150	0.3	–0.1
Majority		8,360	16.9	+7.9
Turnout		49,676	70.0	+6.2
Labour hold		Swing	+3.9	

^{1}: After nominations were closed, Sen was suspended from UKIP after sending an allegedly anti-semitic tweet to Liverpool Wavertree Labour candidate Luciana Berger. His name still appeared on ballot papers with the UKIP party name.

General election 2010: West Lancashire
Party	Candidate	Votes	%	±%
Labour	Rosie Cooper	21,883	45.1	–2.9
Conservative	Adrian Owens	17,540	36.2	+2.2
Liberal Democrats	John Gibson	6,573	13.6	–0.5
UKIP	Damon Noone	1,775	3.7	+1.6
Green	Peter Cranie	485	1.0	New
Clause 28	David Braid	217	0.4	–0.3
Majority		4,343	8.9	–5.2
Turnout		48,473	63.8	+6.1
Labour hold		Swing	–2.6	

=== Elections in the 2000s ===
General election 2005: West Lancashire
Party	Candidate	Votes	%	±%
Labour	Rosie Cooper	20,746	48.1	–6.4
Conservative	Alf Doran	14,662	34.0	+2.0
Liberal Democrats	Richard Kemp	6,059	14.0	+2.4
UKIP	Alan Freeman	871	2.0	New
English Democrat	Stephen Garrett	525	1.2	New
Clause 28	David Braid	292	0.7	0.0
Majority		6,084	14.1	–8.4
Turnout		43,155	57.7	–1.1
Labour hold		Swing	–4.2	

General election 2001: West Lancashire
Party	Candidate	Votes	%	±%
Labour	Colin Pickthall	23,404	54.5	–5.8
Conservative	Jeremy Myers	13,761	32.0	+2.9
Liberal Democrats	John Thornton	4,966	11.6	+4.4
Independent	David Hill	523	1.2	+0.5
Independent	David Braid	317	0.7	New
Majority		9,643	22.5	–8.7
Turnout		42,971	58.8	–15.8
Labour hold		Swing	–4.4	

=== Elections in the 1990s ===
General election 1997: West Lancashire
Party	Candidate	Votes	%	±%
Labour	Colin Pickthall	33,022	60.3	+10.9
Conservative	Chris Varley	15,903	29.1	–13.3
Liberal Democrats	Arthur Wood	3,938	7.2	+0.2
Referendum	Michael Carter	1,025	1.9	New
Natural Law	John Collins	449	0.8	+0.3
Independent	David Hill	392	0.7	New
Majority		17,119	31.2	+24.4
Turnout		54,729	74.6	–8.0
Labour hold		Swing	+12.1	

General election 1992: West Lancashire
Party	Candidate	Votes	%	±%
Labour	Colin Pickthall	30,128	47.1	+5.6
Conservative	Ken Hind	28,051	43.9	+0.2
Liberal Democrats	Peter Reilly	4,884	7.6	–7.2
Green	Philip Pawley	546	0.9	New
Natural Law	Bevin Morris	336	0.5	New
Majority		2,077	3.2	N/A
Turnout		63,945	82.6	+2.9
Labour gain from Conservative		Swing	+2.7	

=== Elections in the 1980s ===
General election 1987: West Lancashire
Party	Candidate	Votes	%	±%
Conservative	Ken Hind	26,500	43.7	–2.6
Labour	Colin Pickthall	25,147	41.5	+7.7
SDP	Robert Jermyn	8,972	14.8	–5.2
Majority		1,353	2.2	–10.3
Turnout		60,619	79.7	+5.3
Conservative hold		Swing	–5.1	

General election 1983: West Lancashire
Party	Candidate	Votes	%	±%
Conservative	Ken Hind	25,458	46.3	
Labour	Josie Farrington	18,600	33.8	
SDP	Andrew D. Sackville	10,983	20.0	
Majority		6,858	12.5	
Turnout		55,041	74.4	
Conservative win (new seat)				

== See also ==
- Ormskirk (UK Parliament constituency)
- Parliamentary constituencies in Lancashire

== Sources ==
- Election results, 1983 - 2001
