= Skelmersdale =

Town in Lancashire, England

Coordinates: 53.550°N 2.776°W

- Town
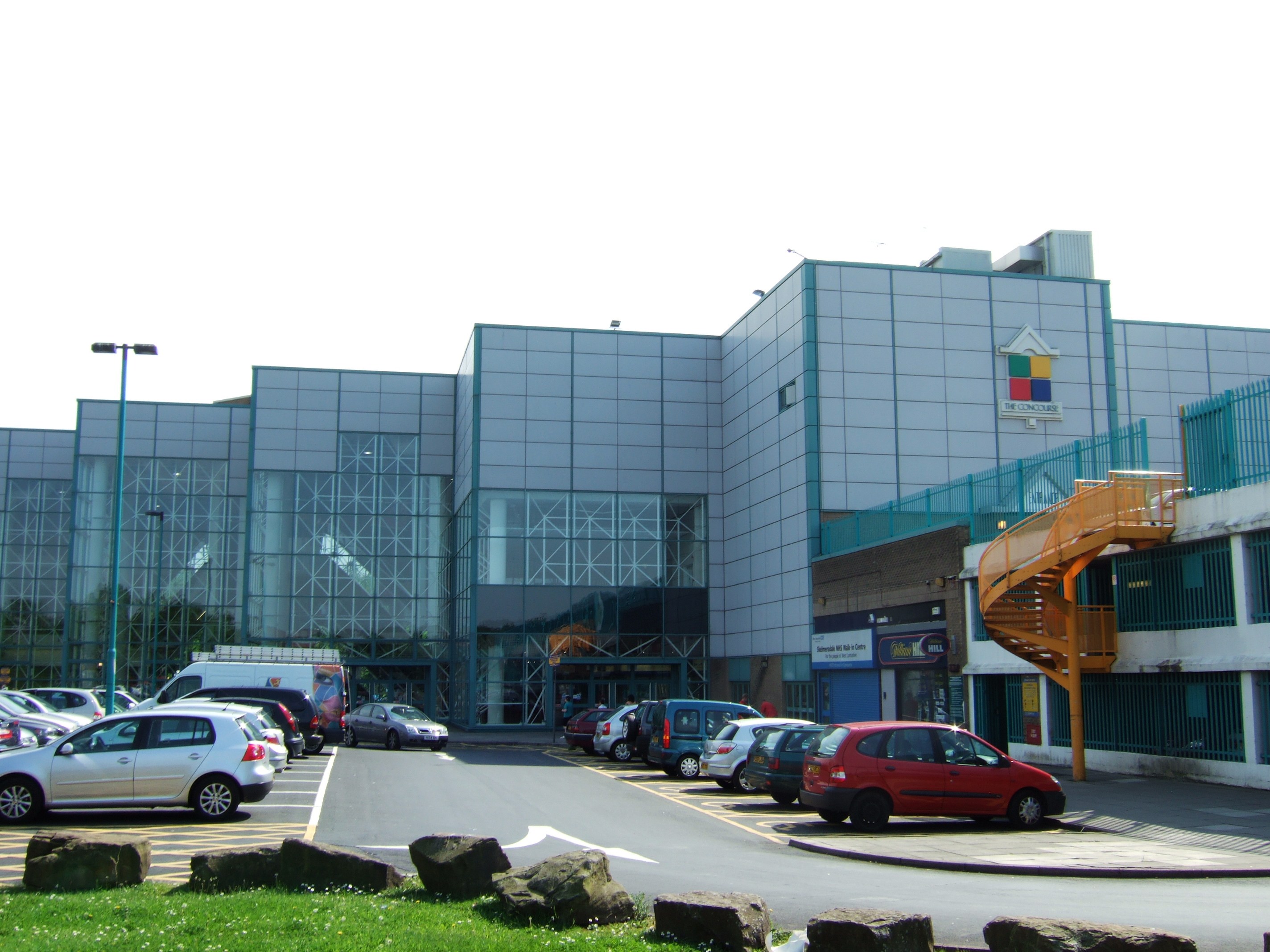
- The Concourse shopping centre, Skelmersdale

- Location in West Lancashire Location of town centre in Skelmersdale Location within Lancashire
- Population: 38,813
- OS grid reference: SD487062
  - London: 180 mi (290 km) SE
- District: West Lancashire
- Shire county: Lancashire
- Region: North West
- Country: England
- Sovereign state: United Kingdom
- Post town: SKELMERSDALE
- Postcode district: WN8
- Dialling code: 01695
- Police: Lancashire
- Fire: Lancashire
- Ambulance: North West
- UK Parliament: West Lancashire

Skelmersdale /ˈskɛlmərzdeɪl/ is a town in the West Lancashire district of Lancashire, England. It sits on the River Tawd, 6 miles (10 km) west of Wigan, 13 miles (21 km) north-east of Liverpool and 15 miles (24 km) south-west of Preston. In 2006, it had a population of 38,813. The town is known locally as Skem /ˈskɛm/.

While the first record of the town is in the Domesday Book of 1086, much of the town, including the current town centre, was developed as a second wave new town in the 1960s. The town's initial development as a coal town coincided with the Industrial Revolution in the 19th century; the town lies on the Lancashire Coalfield.

== Geography ==
Skelmersdale is situated in a small valley on the River Tawd. The town was designed to accommodate both nature and compact housing estates, and the town centre contains a large amount of forestation. The Beacon Country Park lies to the east of Skelmersdale, where the Beacon Point lies, along with a golf club. Furthermore, the Tawd Valley Park runs through the centre of the town, where improvement efforts from the council are currently ongoing.

The town borders Up Holland to the east, Ormskirk to the north-west, and St Helens to the south. Furthermore, the town lies on the periphery of Wigan and Greater Manchester. The M58 runs to the south of Skelmersdale, from Wigan to Liverpool.

The New Town is the larger eastern part of the town which was built primarily in the 1960s as a second wave new town, and the 'Old Town' is the much smaller and older part of the town in the south west; Skelmersdale was mentioned in the Domesday Book of 1086. The town is further divided into seven wards: Skelmersdale North, Skelmersdale South, Birch Green, Ashurst, Digmoor, Moorside and Tanhouse.

== History ==
=== Toponymy ===
Skelmersdale means "Skjaldmarr's valley", from the Old Norse personal name Skjaldmarr + probably Old Norse dalr (or Old English dæl) "dale, valley". The name was recorded as Skalmeresedel in 1136.

It is locally known as "Skem", with a further distinction being made between "Old Skem" (the area which was a small mining town before 1961) and the broader swathe of development on the east side of the town.

=== Early history ===
Until the creation of Skelmersdale Urban District Council at the end of the 19th century, the town was part of the Parish of Ormskirk in the West Derby hundred, an ancient subdivision of Lancashire, covering the southwest of the county.

In the mid-14th century, the manor of Skelmersdale was held by William Dacre, 2nd Baron Dacre.

=== Modern history ===
In 1858, Blague Gate railway station in Skelmersdale was opened on the new Ormskirk to Rainford line. It was renamed to Skelmersdale railway station in 1874, before closing in 1956 and its demolition shortly after 1968.

Skelmersdale's population in 1851 was only 760, but 50 years later it had increased to 5,699. It was a busy coal mining town. There were over 100 fatalities in Skelmersdale collieries from 1851 to 1900, according to the Reports of the Inspectors of Coal Mines, and an unknown number of serious injuries. In 1880 there were 14 Skelmersdale collieries—most of them closed in the 1920s and '30s.

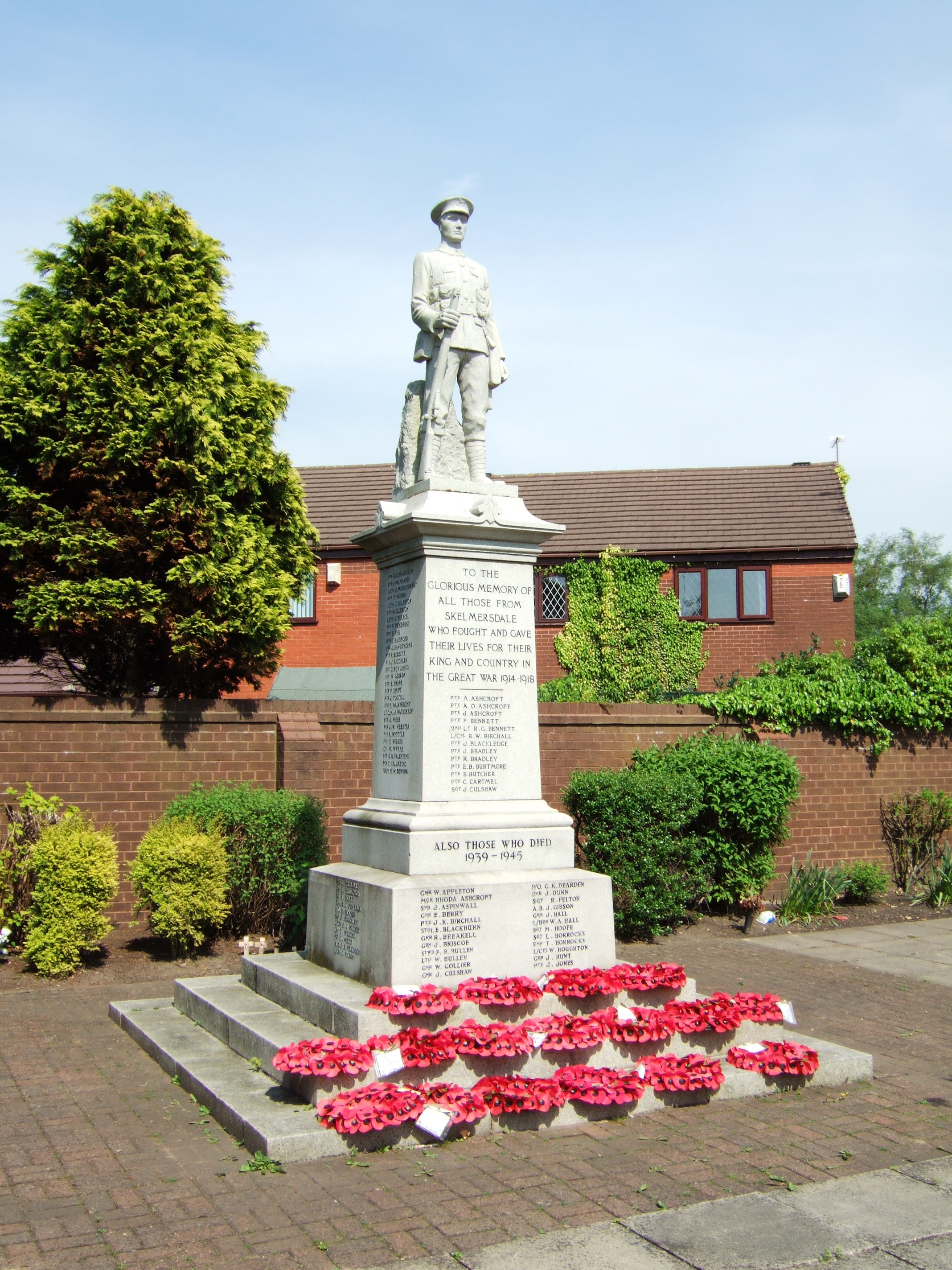
Skelmersdale War Memorial

The miners, many of whom were Welsh migrants, brought with them their own brand of Nonconformist Christianity. By the start of the 20th century there were at least six dissenting chapels in the town: two Wesleyan (Berry Street, closed in the 1920s, and Liverpool Road, closed 1969), an independent Methodist, a Primitive Methodist, a Congregational and a Welsh Chapel (closed in 1963).

Today, there is little to remind people that the town was part of the once great Lancashire Coalfield, although a Skelmersdale Heritage Society was re-established in 2019.

There were also numerous brickworks in the area, and in the early-20th century Victoria County History, Skelmersdale was described as "a particularly bare, unpleasing district" owing to its coal mines and brickworks.

=== New town ===
In 1961 Skelmersdale was designated a new town, designed to house overspill population from the north Liverpool conurbation. The town was the first in the second wave of designations.

Skelmersdale endured mixed economic fortunes during the last three decades of the 20th century. With the economic downturn in the late 1970s, large industrial employers left the town en masse, resulting in an increase in crime, drug abuse and poverty. Today, West Lancashire has a crime rate below the national average. 2006 saw a regeneration drive for the town coordinated through English Partnerships and the Northwest Regional Development Agency and publicly headed by the designer Wayne Hemingway. Among the proposals was a new central focus for the entertainment and commerce for the town in the evening.

In 2012, a £20m vision to create a regenerated town centre for Skelmersdale was revealed. It is expected to create as many as 500 permanent jobs, and current projections seem to satisfy that target. Although Skelmersdale faces a looming employment crisis, the regeneration of the town centre is a step towards recovery, and up to 100 extra jobs would be generated during the scheme's construction phase alone.

Proposals included a new food store as well as a number of bars, shops and restaurants, and a five-screen cinema. A new promenade would be fronted by these establishments to overlook the Tawd Valley Park, and a new civic square would also be created between the Concourse Shopping Centre and the town library. Regeneration specialists St Modwen have been working on the proposals with West Lancashire Council and the Homes and Communities Agency.

In January 2020, work began on a new Lidl supermarket and a B&M store, along with an additional vacant retail unit, which would later be leased out to Poundstretcher, and work began on a new two-screen cinema operated by US company Star Cinemas in May 2020, which opened in May 2021 under the name Ultra Star Cinema; however it was re-branded to "Capitol Cinema" in June 2021. In June 2020, Lancashire County Council acquired the site of the former Glenburn Sports College, and approved £2 million of funding to demolish the site and prepare the location for development as a railway station.

The new Lidl store opened on 9 June 2022, and the B&M store opened on 6 July 2022. In addition to this, the third vacant retail unit was taken up by Poundstretcher, which opened on 1 November 2022. In addition to this, the pathway between West Lancashire College and the Concourse Shopping Centre opened in June, however, the high street linking the two sites has not yet been constructed. In addition to this, the Queen Elizabeth II Platinum Jubilee Park was constructed in the area, linking in with the new town centre developments. The park opened in June but was closed again in August due to vandalism and health and safety concerns due to missing safety equipment and fires caused by local teenagers.

There are plans to redevelop the land behind the new Lidl store to build a new health and wellbeing centre, featuring a gym, swimming pool, café, and children's play park. This will also result in the demolition of the existing Nye Bevan site. Plans have also been submitted by EG Group and approved by West Lancashire Borough Council to build a Starbucks café in the car park of the town's Asda store, the Starbucks café officially opened on 19 June 2025.

== Transport ==
=== Road ===
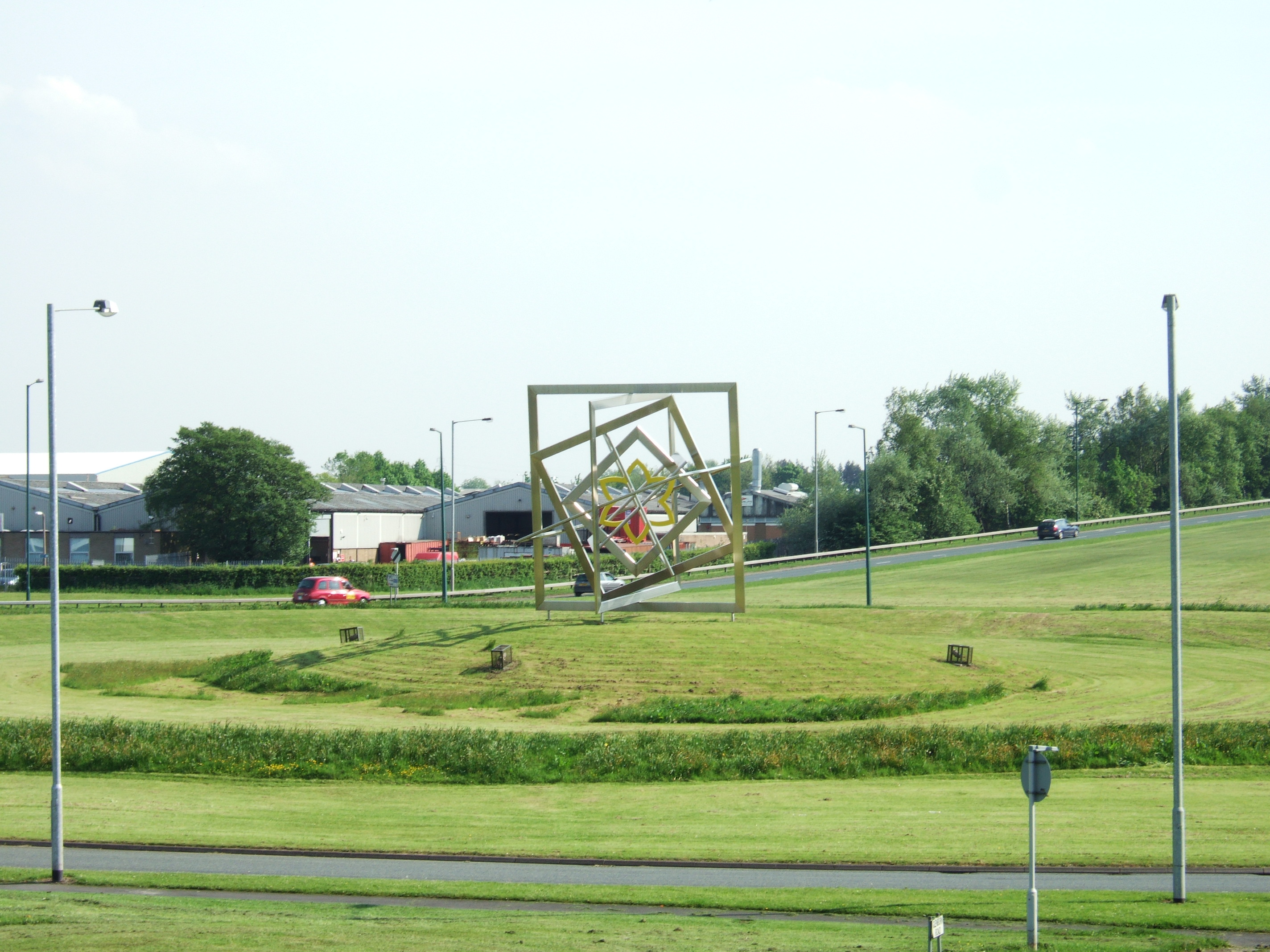
Hope Island, one of many roundabouts found within Skelmersdale.

Skelmersdale has been designed to work on a roundabout system and there is only one set of traffic lights in the town. For ease of access, there is a subway network allowing pedestrians to move through the town without needing to cross potentially hazardous roads. However, the subway system was called into question in 2020 by former West Lancashire MP Rosie Cooper and others with regard to its safety and sustainability, as they are not regularly maintained by the county council.

The M58 motorway runs along the south of Skelmersdale from Wigan and the nearby M6 motorway to the Switch Island interchange at Liverpool. The A570 and the A577 both provide connections.

The New Town areas of Skelmersdale have a road-naming system where residential streets rarely feature words such as "Road" and "Street" and single-name roads are common, e.g. Abbeywood, Fairburn, Brierfield, Thornwood. "Road", "Street", "Lane" and "Drive" do appear in road names, but only in the parts of the town that pre-date or post-date the New Town development. The road names in New Town areas are also arranged in a loosely alphabetical format with large areas being defined by a single letter, for example, Larkhill, Leeswood, Ledburn and Lindens all connect to Ashley Road in the Ashurst area.

Roads in the industrial estates and the main roads in the town such as Gillibrands Road follow the usual naming conventions, although the industrial estates do feature street names beginning with the same letter. For example, Pikelaw Place, Penketh Place, Pinfold Place and Priorswood Place are all part of the Pimbo Industrial Estate.

=== Bus ===
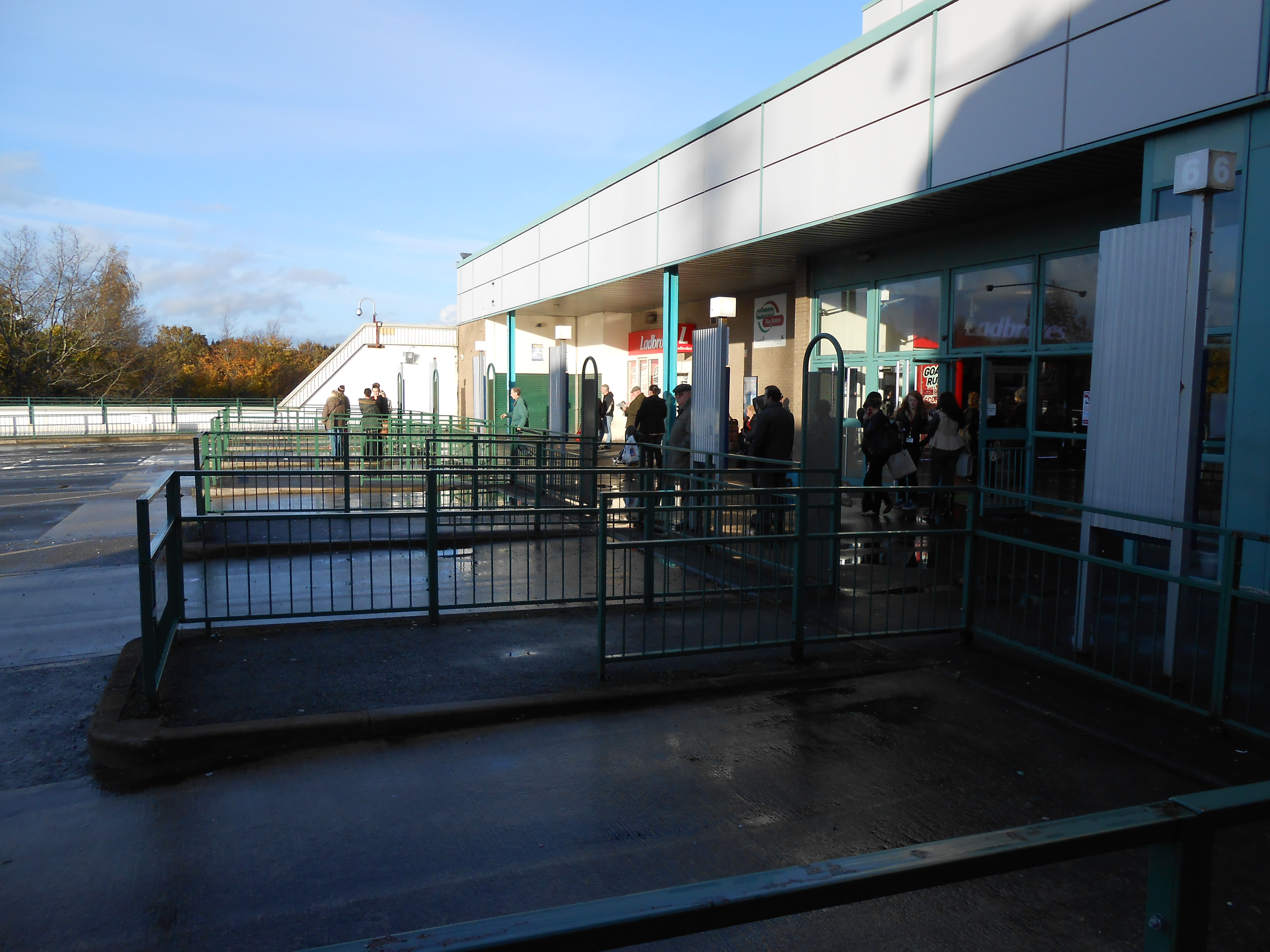
Skelmersdale bus station

In September 2011, the company providing most of Skelmersdale's bus services, Arriva North West, closed its depot in Skelmersdale, which employed 129 people. The depot was first constructed for Ribble Motor Services in the 1970s, and the premises were sold. Skelmersdale is now served by buses from Arriva depots in St Helens, Bootle and Southport. In 2023, a Stagecoach service to Headbolt Lane in Kirkby was introduced, and in late 2023, a Preston Bus service to Rainford was also introduced.

=== Rail ===
Since the closure of Skelmersdale railway station in 1956, the town has become the second most populous town in the North West, after Leigh, without a railway station. The nearest railway station is Upholland railway station on the Wigan Wallgate to Kirkby branch line (historically part of the Liverpool and Bury Railway line). The Skelmersdale Branch previously connected Skelmersdale to Ormskirk and Rainford Junction.

In 2009, Network Rail proposed to extend the existing quarter-hourly Liverpool Central to Kirkby service, to terminate at a new station in the centre of Skelmersdale. Rainford would then become an interchange station for services to and from Wigan Wallgate. In 2009, the Association of Train Operating Companies published a report, Connecting Communities, which also recommended the opening of a new rail link to Skelmersdale. This time the recommendation was via the Skelmersdale Branch from Ormskirk. In February 2017, Lancashire County Council identified the site of the former Glenburn Sports College / West Lancashire College Westbank Campus site as the preferred location for a railway station for the town. Despite the Glenburn Sports College being owned by the council, the Westbank Campus site was owned by NCG and required purchase by the council in order for the station to be built. In 2017, Merseytravel and Lancashire County Council committed £5 million into a study to investigate the possibility of re-opening the station. Combined with the creation of a new station at Headbolt Lane in Kirkby, it is believed that the scheme could cost around £300 million to develop.

In 2020, Lancashire County Council acquired the site of the former Glenburn Sports College, and approved £2 million to demolish the buildings on the site and prepare the area for the construction of a railway station.

Plans for the reopening were dealt a blow when the Department for Transport announced in July 2022 that it was rejecting the Strategic Outline Business Case. The DfT instead suggested that better bus links with the Kirkby–Wigan rail line would be a cheaper way of improving connectivity for Skelmersdale. This would be introduced with the 319 Stagecoach bus service, which runs between Skelmersdale Bus Station and Kirkby Railway Station, and will run to Headbolt Lane Railway Station once a normal Merseyrail service to Headbolt Lane resumes.

In 2022, Lancashire County Council announced that intends to 'dispose' of the former Glenburn Sports College and West Lancashire College land, under the School Standards and Framework Act 1988.

== Education and culture ==
Skelmersdale has a number of primary schools, and has two high schools: Our Lady Queen of Peace Catholic Engineering College and Lathom High School. Glenburn Sports College closed on 31 August 2016 following an unsuccessful campaign backed by former local MP Rosie Cooper to prevent the closure.

West Lancashire College has a campus in the centre of the town. The college merged with Newcastle College in 2007 and was graded as 'good' in a recent Ofsted inspection. In 2021, Brian Cox launched the college's 'School of Science', a £1.3 million facility with the intention of increasing the number of students who study science, technology, engineering and mathematics.

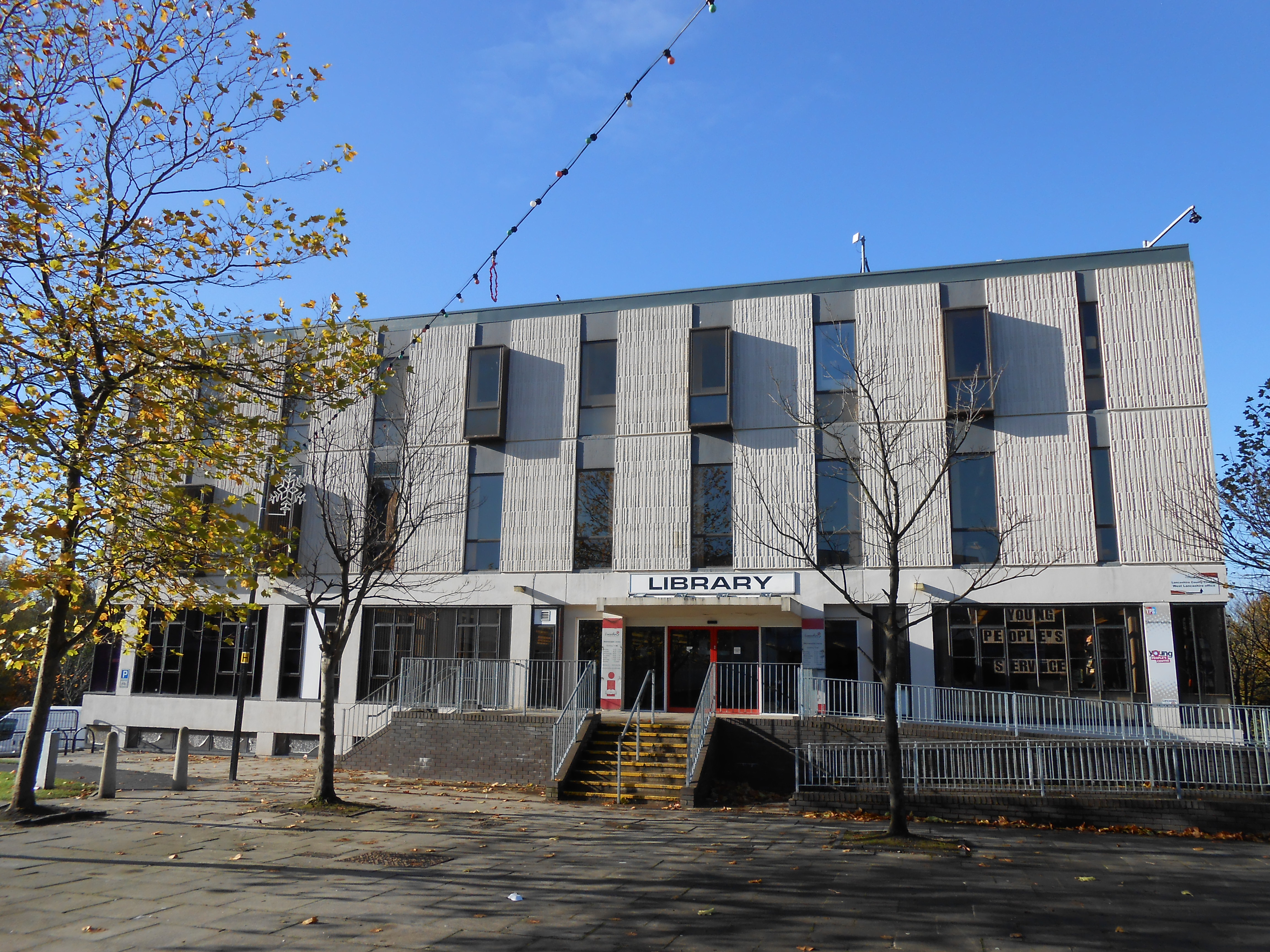
Skelmersdale Library

There is a Transcendental Meditation movement community within Skelmersdale, called "European Sidhaland". It has a Maharishi School which, as of 2019, performed 'well above average' according to Ofsted. In 2011, it was one of 24 schools that applied for and received government funding as a flagship free school.

Skelmersdale is also home to a large public library with facilities including free internet access and an extensive local history section.

The town is host to a number of cultural and social organisations, such as the Artz Centre which provides opportunities in creative fields, and The Birchwood Centre which aims to reduce social isolation and homelessness.

The town featured in TV series Utopia and features in the musical Blood Brothers.

=== Social issues ===
According to urban planning consultancy Space Syntax, Skelmersdale's fragmented streets have made its centre relatively inaccessible and this has resulted in segregated land use. According to a 2017 Lancashire County Council report, Skelmersdale has one of the highest percentages of children living in poverty in Lancashire at 27%, and the highest accident and emergency attendance rate in Lancashire for 0–4 and 5–19 year olds. Furthermore, Skelmersdale's poverty levels are above the national average.

Skelmersdale's crime rates are above the Lancashire average at 93 crimes per 1,000 people, and is the 21st most dangerous overall out of Lancashire's 236 towns, villages, and cities. Skelmersdale was the worst medium-sized town in Lancashire in 2020 for drugs.

== Economy ==
Although consisting predominantly of housing estates, Skelmersdale's industry includes the Co-operative Bank which employs 650 people, distribution centres for Asda, P&G, Victorian Plumbing, a Walkers snack food factory, Chemist 4 U and many others. Skelmersdale formerly housed the corporate base and a distribution centre for Matalan, the discount clothing and homewares store, who later relocated to Knowsley Industrial Park. Frederick's Dairies, now owned by R&R Ice Cream UK Ltd, who make ice cream for Cadbury, and many others, are also located in Skelmersdale.

=== Town centre ===
Skelmersdale's town centre is made up of the Concourse Shopping Centre, (colloquially known as "the Connie") as well as a supermarket, a library, a swimming pool and gym named after former Minister of Health Aneurin Bevan (however there are plans to redevelop these facilities), West Lancashire College's main campus, a multistorey car park, and the Tawd Valley Retail Park.

The Concourse is home to a number of national chain stores. The Concourse used to have an artwork by Alan Boyson, in the shape of a pyramid. The pyramid was located in front of the entrance opposite the ecumenical centre until the early to mid-1980s but was removed for safety reasons.

There are also smaller shopping parades in Skelmersdale which include Sandy Lane Shopping Centre, Digmoor Parade and Ashurst Shopping Centre.

== Politics ==
Skelmersdale is in the West Lancashire parliamentary constituency, and has been represented by Ashley Dalton, a Labour Party MP, since the 2023 West Lancashire by-election. Furthermore, as of June 2021, Skelmersdale is represented by three Labour Party councillors across three wards on Lancashire County Council, and all twelve borough councillors for wards in Skelmersdale on West Lancashire Borough Council are members of the Labour Party. Until the 2021 Local elections, Skelmersdale had only elected Labour Party councillors for over fifty years.

Skelmersdale Independent Party, established in February 2019, is active in the town and advocates for the establishment of a Skelmersdale Town Council. While the party has contested multiple seats on West Lancashire Borough Council, it has been unsuccessful in gaining seats.

== Sports ==
The town's original football team, Skelmersdale United F.C., plays in Liverpool County Premier League Premier Division and was a FA Vase winner in 1971. One of its former players, Steve Heighway, went on to play for Liverpool. Former Everton midfielder Leon Osman, who takes his son to Dalton St Michael's Primary School in nearby Dalton, played for the club in his youth. Former Cardiff City player Craig Noone also once played for the club. Skelmersdale United currently groundshare with Marine AFC in Crosby, having last been based in the town of Skelmersdale at JMO Sports Park. The club will groundshare with Burscough F.C. for the 2026/27 football season.

Ahead of the 2026/27 season, local amateur club Clay Brow F.C. merged with other local sports groups to form Skelmersdale Town F.C., becoming the town's second club, and only one to actually be based in the town. The club plays at JMO Sports Park.

The town is host to an archery club, the Bowmen of Skelmersdale, whose collective members hold 19 county records and 14 world records held by three members of the same family (Melissa-Jane, Harriet and Gary Daniel), six of which were claimed at the National Flight Championships on 19 August 2006 held at RAF Church Fenton. Furthermore, Skelmersdale Cricket Club was established in 1891.

The Merseyside Nighthawks, an American football team who play at JMO Sports Park in the town, are members of the BAFA National Leagues and play in the Premier North Division.

== Cadet forces ==
Skelmersdale has units of the Air Training Corps, Army Cadet Force and Sea Cadet Corps. These units take part in the local community life and are routinely seen attending the Remembrance Sunday parade in the old town.

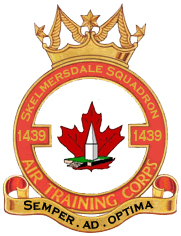
1439 Sqn Crest showing Ashurst Beacon and Canadian Maple Leaf

=== Air Training Corps ===
1439 (Skelmersdale) Squadron, Air Cadets, formed at Upholland Grammar School in 1941 as the 'Beacon Squadron' and provided airmanship training for young men and those about to join the RAF in time for the Battle of Britain. The squadron continues to provide airmanship training to young men and women in addition to other activities. They are based on Daniels Lane.

=== Army Cadet Force ===
The Army Cadets are part of 'S' Company of the Lancashire Force. They are based on Daniels Lane.

=== Sea Cadets Corps ===
The Sea Cadets has a unit in Skelmersdale that trains cadets aged from 10 to 17 years. The unit is located on Tawd Road.

== Notable people ==
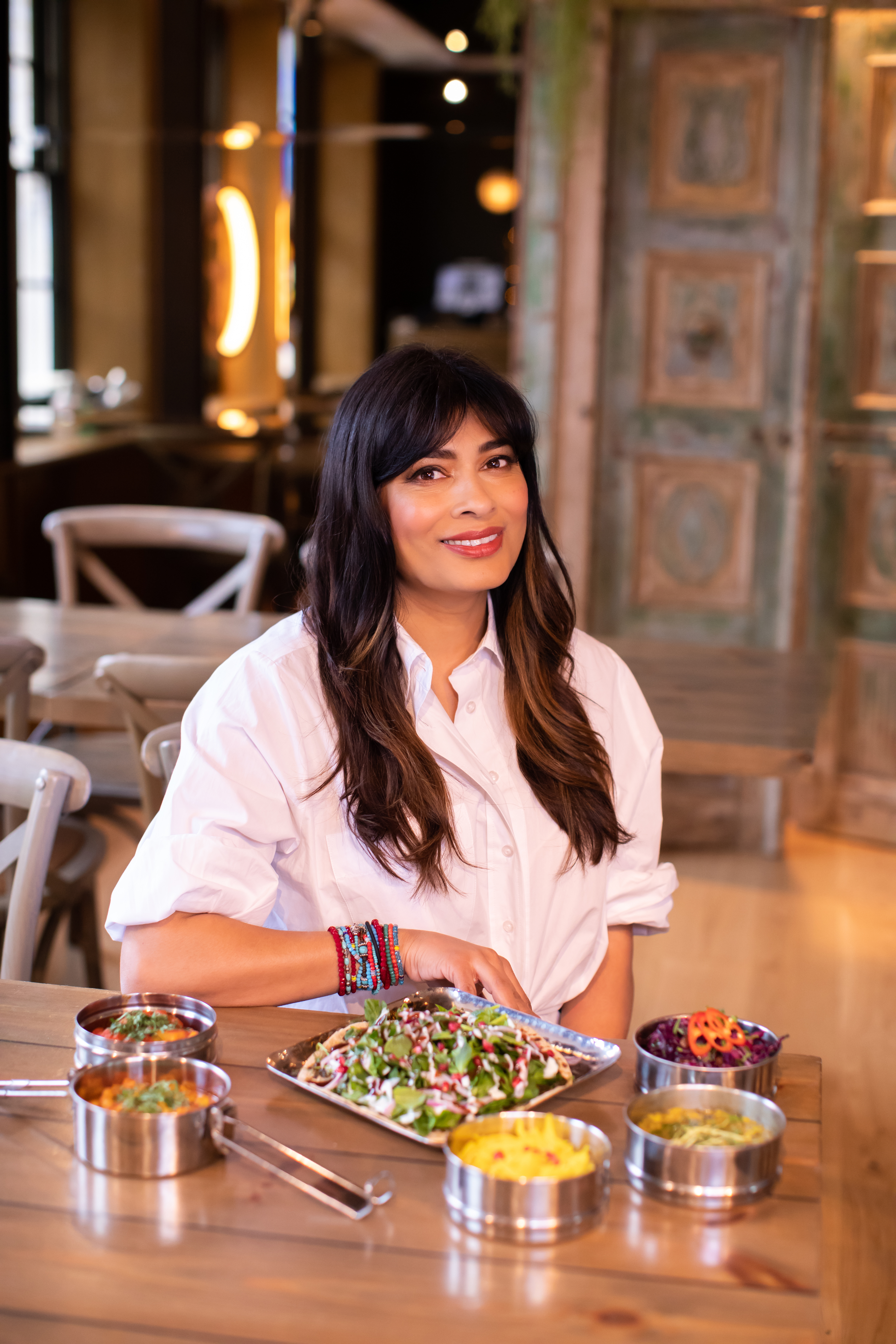
Nisha Katona, 2024

- Thomas Aspinwall (1846–1901), trade unionist born in Bickerstaffe but lived in Skelmersdale
- Stephen James Bennett (born ca.1955), musician and writer, has collaborated with Tim Bowness
- Nisha Katona (born 1971), British restaurateur and TV personality.
- Simon Tong (born 1972), musician who was a member of the Verve and guitarist for Damon Albarn.
- Jessica Gagen (born 1996), beauty pageant titleholder; Miss England 2023, Miss United Kingdom 2024, and Miss World Europe 2023.

=== Sport ===
- John Littlewood (1931–2009), chess player, lived locally.
- Matt Woods (1931–2014), footballer, played about 390 games, including 260 for Blackburn Rovers
- Leon Osman (born 1981), footballer, born in Wigan, raised locally; played 381 games, mainly for Everton.
- Keanan Brand (born 1999), rugby league footballer who has played 76 pro. games
- Molly Jones (born 2004), England international rugby league footballer who currently plays for Wigan Warriors

== Twin towns ==
West Lancashire is twinned with Erkrath (Germany) and Cergy-Pontoise (France).

== See also ==
- Listed buildings in Skelmersdale
- West Lancashire
- Lancashire County Council
- West Lancashire College
- Lathom High School
