= Hollies Convent FCJ School =

- Manchester; England

Information
- Type: Comprehensive
- Established: September 1900
- Founder: Marie-Madeleine d'Houët
- Closed: 1985
- Local authority: Manchester
- Gender: Girls
- Age: 11 to 16
- Enrolment: 720
- Website: https://holliesfcjschool.blogspot.com/

The Hollies Convent FCJ School was a girls' direct-grant Roman Catholic grammar school in south Manchester, England.

== History ==
In 1820, Marie-Madeleine d'Houët, also known as Marie Madeleine Victoire, founded the society of the Faithful Companions of Jesus in Amiens, France.

The school began at the Hollies in September 1900 on Oak Drive in Fallowfield. 'The Hollies' was the home of German immigrant businessman Otho Horkheimer, a director of Wrexham Lager, and in a partnership with Eugene Anselm Jacob Goldschmid until October 1894. Nearby lived Sir Edward Donner, who helped with fundraising.

=== Grammar school ===
Another house 'The Acorns' was bought in 1920. 'Staneswood' was bought in 1952.

In the mid-1940s, it became a direct-grant grammar school. Éamon de Valera, aged 72, visited on Friday 18 February 1955, also visiting Hopwood Hall RC Teachers' College.

In October 1955, a new 15-acre site was found next to the Mersey, in Didsbury. The new site would cost £300,000, with much of that to be funded by the local Catholic church. There were 430 girls, with 58 in the sixth form.

The University of Manchester acquired the site in the late 1950s for student accommodation (Fallowfield Campus), so a new Hollies FCJ Grammar School opened on Mersey Road, Fielden Park, in West Didsbury in September 1961; a new preparatory school of 200 children was built too. 520 girls joined the new £250,000 school in Didsbury, with grounds of 16 acres. It was near the Fielden Park College of Further Education.

By 1973 there were around 720 girls.

The FCJ also ran the Sedgley Park Training College in Prestwich.

In February 1963, the school choir performed with the Royal Liverpool Philharmonic Orchestra.

The school had an excellent academic reputation.

=== Comprehensive ===
In 1976, the school was requested to become a comprehensive, as direct grant schools were being phased out. It became a comprehensive in 1977, the Hollies RC High School.

On Sunday 14 May 1978, the Radio 4 morning service was broadcast from the school.

In 1983, RC Salford Diocese planned to amalgamate the school with the St Mark's school, on the St Mark's site, with the Hollies site closing in August 1984. The Hollies High School closed and the new and The Barlow Roman Catholic High School in 1985.

A service of Thanksgiving took place in June 1985 at the Church of the Holy Name.

The 4.9-acre site was put on sale in February 1989.

=== Demolition ===
The site was demolished in the late 1980s, and it is now a housing estate.

== Structure ==
The school was around a half-mile north-east of the M63 (now M60) junction 5, close to the River Mersey, near the B5167.

== Alumni ==
- Caroline Aherne, actress, known for The Fast Show; acquired nine grade A O-levels, later in 1991 she developed her character 'Sister Mary Immaculate', a saucy nun who smoked, from her time at the school, and this character largely launched her career, being first performed at Mulberry's in Withington
- Anne Hobbs, tennis player, didn't take her A levels, left in early 1975 to do tennis
- Dame Joan McVittie, (nee Docherty), headteacher, President from 2011 to 2012 of the Association of School and College Leaders (ASCL)
- Catherine Reilly, bibliographer and anthologist
- Paula Wilcox, actress

== See also ==
- Catholic Church in England
- Bellerive FCJ Catholic College in Liverpool
- Harrytown Catholic High School (former Harrytown Convent Girls' School)
- Upton Hall School FCJ
