= Clare O'Connor =

Australian religious sister and member of the Faithful Companions of Jesus

Sister Clare O'Connor FCJ

Personal life
- Born: Clare O'Connor

Religious life
- Religion: Christianity
- Denomination: Roman Catholic
- Order: Faithful Companions of Jesus
- Founder of: Marie-Madeleine d'Houët

Sister Clare O'Connor FCJ was an Australian religious sister, historian and author known for her work in documenting the history of the Faithful Companions of Jesus (FCJ) in Australia. The Faithful Companions of Jesus is a female religious institute of the Roman Catholic Church. The congregation was initially founded in France in 1820 and first came to Australia in 1882.

== Life and ministry ==
Sister Mary Clare O'Connor, FCJ, was born in Ireland. After coming to Australia, she was a student at St Ignatius School and Vaucluse College in Richmond, an inner suburb of Melbourne.

The FCJ Sisters are a Catholic religious congregation founded in France in 1820 by Marie Madeleine d'Houët, with a focus on education and spiritual retreats. After Jesuit priest Rev. Fr. J. Dalton sent an urgent invitation to the Rev. Mother Josephine Petit FCJ, asking for sisters to come to take charge of a girls' school, twelve FCJ sisters arrived in Melbourne on the S.S. Liguria in 1882. They took charge of St. Ignatius Girls’ School and opened a secondary day school for girls on the same property.

After completing her novitiate in Brussels, O'Connor studied at the University of Fribourg and the University of Dublin, obtaining her Arts Degree at the latter institution. Not long after returning to Australia, she went to Benalla, in country Victoria, where she spent almost thirty years. O'Connor was in charge of the convent school for fifteen years and was appointed as superior for two terms.

O'Connor was part of the pioneering community that established the order's ministry in Benalla, Victoria, in August 1900, where she initially looked after the convent farm. She spent many years teaching and serving in different FCJ communities in Victoria, including at Richmond and Genazzano FCJ College in Kew, Victoria.

Clare O'Connor is primarily recognised for writing a book detailing the history of the FCJ Sisters in Australia, which was published in Melbourne in 1983. O'Connor's historical account of the FCJ religious congregation serves as a primary source for understanding the development and contributions of the FCJ Sisters within the Australian Catholic Church. Her work is often cited in materials relating to the order's history and their arrival in various Australian towns. She also wrote Come at Once, an account of the journey of Sr Patricia Mary Grogan FCJ from England after the outbreak of World War II.

== Selected publications ==
- O’Connor, M. Clare. The Sisters, Faithful Companions of Jesus in Australia. Armadale, Vic.: Graphic Workshop, 1982.
