= Upton Hall =

Upton Hall may refer to:

- Upton Hall, Merseyside, previously manor house of Upton, Cheshire, UK now home to the Upton Hall School FCJ
  - Upton Hall School FCJ, in Upton, Wirral, England
- Upton Hall, Northamptonshire, England; home of Quinton House School
- Upton Hall, Nottinghamshire, England; the headquarters of the British Horological Institute
- Upton Hall, an academic building at Carlisle Barracks, Carlisle, Pennsylvania, US
