= Upton Hall, Merseyside =

Manor in Upton, England

Coordinates: 53°23′09″N 3°06′00″W

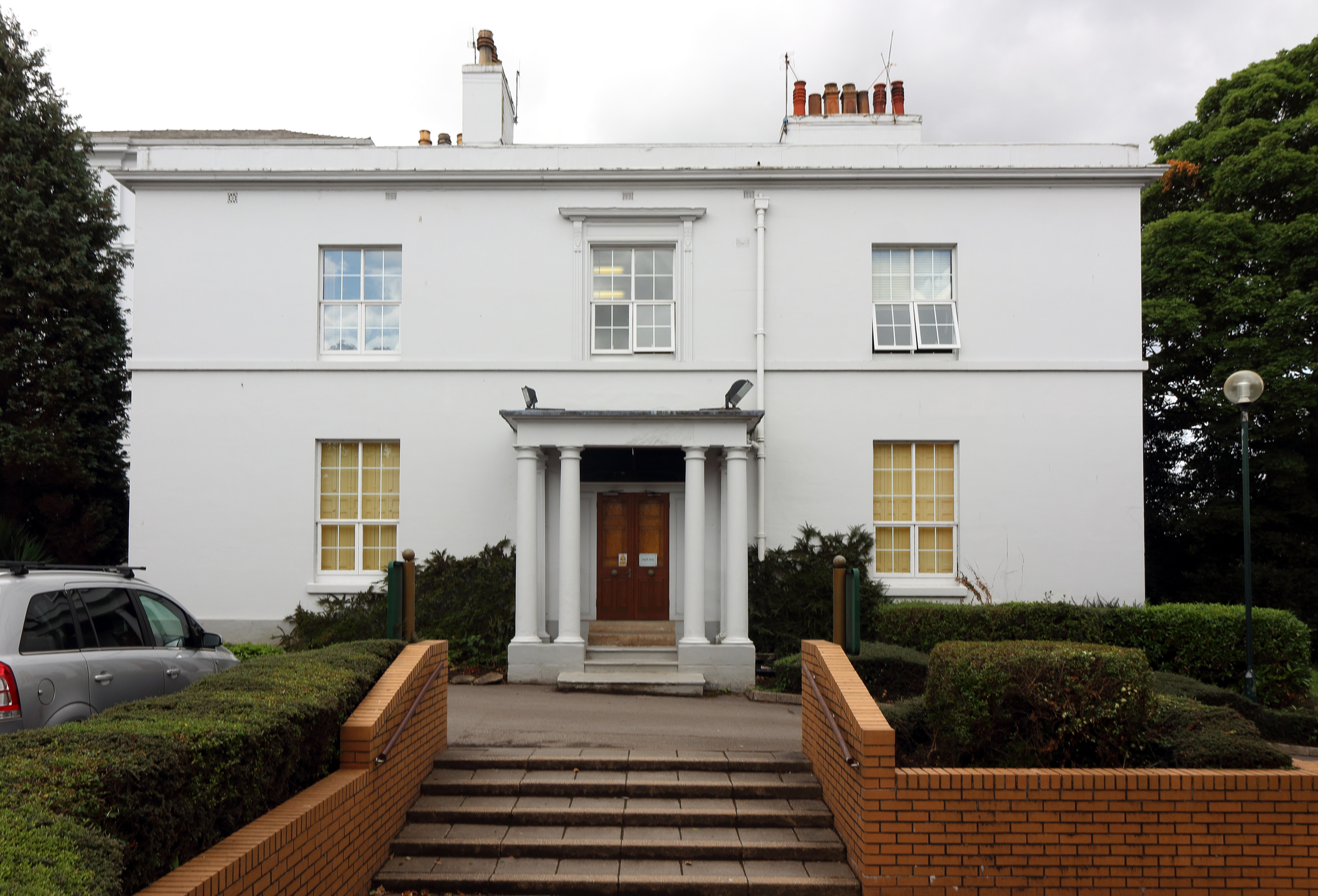
Upton Hall.jpg

Upton Hall is a large manor house on the peninsula known as the Wirral, in the village of Upton in Merseyside, England (historically, the hall was in the county of Cheshire). The owner of the hall was styled the Lord of the manor and also known as the Squire.

The Manor of Upton itself dates back to the Domesday Book in 1086, when it was recorded as being held by William Mallbank. "The title of Lord of the manor of Upton passed from Mallbank to the Praers and Ornebias, one of whom in 1230 gave it, and the Manor of Willaston, to his mother. It descended through female heirs to Sir John Arderne and was given as a wedding present when his daughter married Baldwin Bold in 1310."

Ownership of the hall and associated titles and privileges changed frequently. After six generations of occupation by the Bolds, it was purchased by Robert Davies in 1614. The currently standing Upton Hall, built by the Webster family in the 1800s, is a Grade II listed building.

== The Websters ==
From ca. 1798 to 1861 the hall was owned by the Webster family, formerly farmers from Poulton-cum-Seacombe. John Webster bought Upton manor house, Upton Hall and title "Lord of the manor". He was subsequently known "Squire". His son William was a philanthropist and was widely popular. William Webster took on patronage of the curacy of Woodchurch and erected a school. William married Elizabeth Matthews, ca. 1845, but she died sometime before 1861. The census of that year shows William married to Sophia Elizabeth Curme.

William eldest son, John Egerton Webster, was not well liked. He was described as "He was cross-grained in temper, and even worse." and he was "heartily disliked by the whole countryside." Having a fortune of some £8,000–9,000, he married the young Hannah Branford in about 1834 and they lived off the interest. However, by 1843 he petitioned for insolvency and paid his creditors about 25% of what he owed. In the 1851 census it is the younger brother, William, who lives at Upton with his family. In 1861 John's wife took advantage of newly created Court for Divorce and Matrimonial Causes and divorced John in 1861 on the grounds of cruelty. The newspaper accounts of her testimony paint him as violent and brutal. The Webster family sold Upton Hall in 1862, possibly to pay John Egerton's debts or possibly because the ongoing scandal had negatively impacted their social standing. John Egerton petitioned to be made bankrupt (and relieved of the burden of repaying his debts), but this was declined by the courts on appeal. He is shown by the 1871 census to be an inmate of a poor house in Norwich, England.

The clergyman and malacologist William Henry Webster was born at Upton Hall in 1850.

The Websters rented the hall to William Inman in 1854, while he built his own house nearby.

== Faithful Companions of Jesus ==
Nuns from the Society of the Faithful Companions of Jesus (FCJ) bought Upton Hall from the Websters in December 1862 and turned it into a boarding school for girls. It is now the Upton Hall School FCJ. Since 1972 it has been a day school only.
