= Redcourt St Anselm's =

Location
- 7 Devonshire Place; Prenton, Merseyside, CH43 1TX; England; 53.3872°N 3.0472°W

Information
- Type: Preparatory school
- Religious affiliation: Roman Catholic
- Established: 1947
- Founders: Christian Brothers
- Closed: 2019
- Local authority: Wirral
- Department for Education URN: 105125 Tables
- Gender: Coeducational
- Age: 3 to 11
- Enrolment: 250~
- Website: http://www.redcourtstanselms.com

Redcourt St Anselm's was a Catholic preparatory day school for boys and girls aged 3 to 11 in the Oxton suburb of Prenton, Merseyside, England. It closed in 2019.

== History ==
Redcourt St Anselm's began as the prep department of St. Anselm's College. The Christian Brothers were looking for a place to relocate the younger boys due to the lack of space and purchased Redcourt for £3,250 in 1946. The 197 junior boys moved in the following year with Brother H F Malone as the first headmaster and six other Brothers and lay staff members as teachers. In 1991, girls were first admitted and the nursery department was opened. Due to the Education Act 1993, the senior school (College) took the option to join the state sector (it later became a voluntary aided school) and Redcourt chose to remain private. While it became a fully independent school in its own right and run by lay staff members, it was still under the trusteeship of the Christian Brothers and maintained links with the College.

The school closed at the end of the Summer term in 2019.

=== Redcourt ===
Redcourt was originally a Victorian family home built by prominent Scottish banker George Rae between 1876 and 1879 and designed by Edmund Kirby. The Rae family lived there until the outbreak of World War II. It was used by the Home Guard during the War before it was purchased by the Brothers when the War ended. It was designated a Grade II listed building in 1974.

== Academics ==
Children were prepared for the Common Entrance and 11-plus exams. Leavers usually transferred to local grammar and independent schools or other Catholic schools. Redcourt had links with two local Catholic schools - St. Anselm's College (boys) and Upton Hall School (girls) - and special provisions were made for those intending to continue their secondary education there.

== Former pupils ==
- Paul O'Grady
