= Maria Fidelis =

Maria Fidelis Catholic School FCJ

Location
- 1-39 Drummond Crescent, London; Camden, London, NW1 1LY; England
- 51°31′48″N 0°07′55″W

Information
- School type: Voluntary aided comprehensive state school
- Motto: Growing together, through Christ, with courage, confidence and dignity
- Religious affiliation: Roman Catholic
- Established: 1830; 196 years ago
- Founders: Marie-Madeleine d'Houët; Faithful Companions of Jesus
- Local authority: Camden
- Department for Education URN: 100055 Tables
- Ofsted: Reports
- Head teacher: Mark Anthony
- Years taught: Years 7-13
- Gender: Co-educational
- Age: 11 to 18
- Language: English
- Houses: D'Houet; Guillemet; Faber; Loyola
- Color: Blue
- Nickname: MF
- Website: www.mariafidelis.camden.sch.uk

Maria Fidelis Catholic School FCJ is a Roman Catholic co-educational secondary school in the London Borough of Camden, England. It was founded by the Faithful Companions of Jesus.

== History ==
The school was founded in 1830 by the Faithful Companions of Jesus, or more specifically, their founder, Marie-Madeleine d'Houët. Just months after the school's opening, Marie later realised she could not keep running the school and passed the role of headteacher to Julie Guillemet, a friend of hers and FCJ sister.

It was at first an industrial school financed by charitable appeals. The school then progressed to being a convent boarding school and then to a selective non-fee paying grammar school known as St. Aloysius.

The school then became a comprehensive in 1974 with the merger of St. Aloysius with St. Vincent's Schools which was run by the Sisters of Charity. The name Maria Fidelis was chosen by the Sisters meaning Mary Most Faithful.

Maria Fidelis today stands on Drummond Crescent in the Somers Town area of Camden, near Euston.

The school won BBC's 'School Choir Of The Year' and are known for their vocal arrangements under the direction of Karen Gibson. The choir performed for Pope Benedict XVI at The Big Assembly at St Mary's University College, Twickenham on September 17, 2010 during his visit to the UK.

Since September 2013, the school admits boys as well as girls, in co-education.

== Current Building ==
The High Speed 2 rail network's planned route was to go through North Gower Street, the location of the school's previous building. This meant the school was required to move locations to Drummond Crescent, nearby to Euston Road. Work began on the site in 2017 and the school started moving in 2018, before its official opening in September 2019.

== Notable alumni ==
- Jane Wymark (b. 1952) - actress, Midsomer Murders
- Kathy Burke (born 1964) - comedian, actress and theatre director
- Roisin Conaty (born 1979) - comedian and actress
- Brooke Kinsella (born 1982) - actress
