= Raay =

Raay may refer to:

- Carla van Raay (born 1938), Australian author, counselor and former nun, teacher and call girl
- Raay (musician), Slovenian musician, part of the duo Maraaya alongside Marjetka Vovk
