= For Christ's Sake (disambiguation) =

For Christ's Sake is a 2010 American film.

For Christ's Sake may also refer to:

- For Christ's Sake (Zaetta book), a 1980 book by Julia Zaetta
- For Christ's Sake, a 1986 book by Tom Harpur
- For Christ's Sake, a 2001 album by Mumsdollar
- For Christ's Sake: A Discussion of the Jesus Enigma, a 1975 book by Hugh J. Schonfield

== See also ==
- Christ's sake (disambiguation)
