= St Anselm's College =

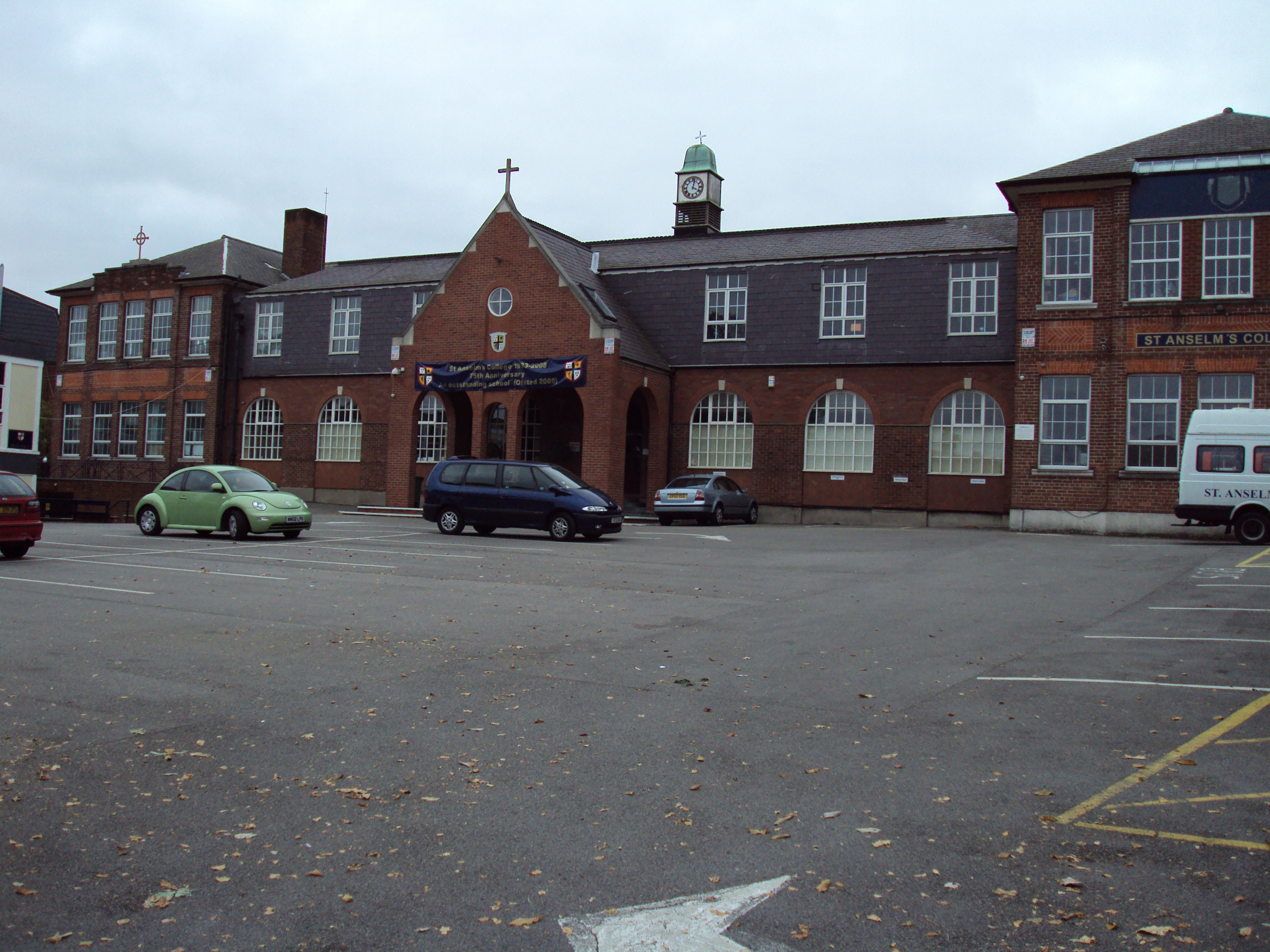
- School badge Main Entrance at the St Anselm's College building

Location
- Manor Hill; Birkenhead, Merseyside, CH43 1UQ; England; 53.390°N 3.048°W

Information
- Type: 11–18 boys Roman Catholic Academy
- Motto: Fides Quaerens Intellectum
- Religious affiliation: Roman Catholic
- Patron saint: St Anselm
- Established: 1933
- Founders: Congregation of Christian Brothers
- Local authority: Wirral Council
- Oversight: Roman Catholic Diocese of Shrewsbury
- Trust: St. Anselm's College Edmund Rice Academy Trust
- Department for Education URN: 136780 Tables
- Ofsted: Reports
- Head teacher: Serena Cubbin
- Gender: Boys
- Age range: 11–18
- Enrolment: 880 (2018)
- Capacity: 1,026
- Alumni: Old Anselmians
- Website: www.st-anselms.com

St Anselm's College is an 11–18 boys, Roman Catholic, grammar school and sixth form with academy status in Birkenhead, Merseyside, England. It was established in 1933 and is located in the Roman Catholic Diocese of Shrewsbury. It is one of four Roman Catholic secondary schools in the Metropolitan Borough of Wirral, and one of three Irish Christian Brothers schools in the Merseyside area.

== History ==
=== Foundation ===
The college was founded as a fee-paying school in 1933 by the trustees of the Congregation of Christian Brothers, at the invitation of Hugh Singleton, Roman Catholic Bishop of Shrewsbury. In 1946 it became a direct grant grammar school and continued as such until 1975, when the trustees opted for the school to be independent in order to continue as a single-sex school.

=== Grant-maintained status ===
The Education Act 1993 gave the trustees the chance to re-enter the maintained sector and so, once again, offer parents the choice of a Catholic Grammar School education for their sons, irrespective of their ability to pay. In 1995, the school became one of the first Independent schools to re-enter the maintained sector. The prep department retained its independent status and was previously known as Redcourt St Anselm's; however, Redcourt closed in 2019.

In September 1999, the school became voluntary aided in line with the Education Act 1998.

=== Specialist School status ===
After two unsuccessful applications, the school finally achieved joint Technology College status together with Upton Hall School, another local Catholic grammar school, as part of the UK specialist schools initiative. The school had, at the time, been unable to apply for specialist Language College status because, Wirral Grammar School for Girls, another school in the Wirral LEA had already applied for this as a first specialism.

Upon achieving the status the school further developed its programme for A-level and GCSE in ICT, installed a wireless computer network in many areas of the school, increased the number of computer workstations available to students for academic work, and also made an email service and extranet available to all students and staff.

In 2006 the joint Technology College designation expired, and the school announced its intention to make an application, independently from Upton Hall School to renew its status. The school also announced, because of the success of the programme, its intention to apply for a second specialism in Languages. Both applications were successful.

In 2009 the college was invited to take up a third designation as a Leadership Partner School.

=== Academy status ===
The school converted to academy status on 1 June 2011.

== Overview ==
=== Admissions ===
Founded in 1933, the school was in recent years granted Technology College and then Academy status, in cooperation with Upton Hall School, the local Catholic girls' school. The school used its specialist school status as an opportunity to improve some teaching facilities and broaden aspects of the curriculum.

=== Links with the church ===
The teaching staff at this and other Christian Brothers schools have traditionally been avowed Christian Brothers, but over the decades, the responsibility for this provision has been passed down to what is now a full-time lay teaching staff of 44, maintaining strong links with the Edmund Rice Family and with the guidance of the Roman Catholic Diocese of Shrewsbury.

=== Ethos and mission ===
Education at the school is, at its core, Roman Catholic, and inspired by the work of Blessed Edmund Rice. It is fundamentally based on the Eight Essentials of Christian Brothers Education, and the religious studies programme at the school follows that prescribed by the Roman Catholic Diocese of Shrewsbury.

The study of the history and ethos of the college forms a part of the Religious Studies programme at Key Stage 3, and is a common focus for the weekly assemblies. (The Christian Brothers resident in the house that adjoins the college ensure that Sixth Form students are kept well informed about the ethos of the college by an annual programme of discourse which complements the PSHE programme.

=== Patron saint ===
Saint Anselm of Canterbury (1033 or 1034 – 21 April 1109).

=== Sports ===
The college has a reputation for sporting achievement far outstripping its size. Notable sporting achievements include winning the National Schools Cross Country Championship at Intermediate Level and winning the Northerns Schools Championship countless times, regularly attending the National Schools Athletics Final and travelling the country competing in various rugby union competitions. The school also partakes in hockey and cricket competitions.

=== Affiliations ===
The college had traditionally been affiliated with Redcourt - St Anselm's, a local independent primary school, and although now independent from the secondary school, both schools are part of the Edmund Rice Family, and share sports facilities in Noctorum.

The joint-technology college status of the school with Upton Hall School until Autumn 2006 gave rise to increased cooperation between the two Catholic grammar schools on the Wirral Peninsula. Other joint activities include language talks and spiritual activities.

== Notable alumni and staff ==
Alumni of the school are referred to as Old Anselmians, or within the school as Old Boys, reflecting the single-sex nature of the school. The alumni association of the college is the Anselmian Association.

- Dave Balfe, keyboard player in various Liverpool bands especially The Teardrop Explodes and manager of Blur (band)
- Harry Charsley, footballer with Oldham Athletic A.F.C., academy graduate of Everton F.C.
- Peter Davenport, footballer with Manchester United F.C., Middlesbrough F.C., Sunderland A.F.C.
- Bob Fitzharris, Archdeacon of Doncaster from 2001 to 2011
- Christian Furr, UK artist who painted HRH
- John Gorman (entertainer) in The Scaffold
- Austin Healey, former England international rugby player (Leicester Tigers)
- Ben Johnston, England international rugby player (England Saxons)
- Prof Dennis Kavanagh, Professor of Politics from 1996 to 2006 at the University of Liverpool
- Ross MacManus, UK musician; father of Elvis Costello
- Chris Malkin, former footballer with Tranmere Rovers F.C.
- Prof Paddy Nixon FBCS FRSA FRSN, Vice-Chancellor of Ulster University
- Sean O'Connor (producer), Executive Producer since 2016 of EastEnders, and former Editor of The Archers on BBC Radio 4
- Mark Palios, former chief executive of The Football Association and owner of Tranmere Rovers F.C.
- Chris Pilgrim, Newcastle Falcons rugby player
- Prof Christopher J. Schofield FRS, chemist, Head of Organic Chemistry since 2011 at the University of Oxford and Fellow of Hertford College, Oxford
- Oliver Shannon, footballer with Everton FC and Atlanta United FC
- Peter Stanford, writer and journalist, Editor from 1988 to 1992 of The Catholic Herald
- Scott Wootton, footballer with Perth Glory F.C., formerly with Manchester United F.C. and Leeds United F.C.
- Simon Mason, former rugby union player, primarily with Ulster, and with 3 caps for Ireland
- Henry Luxemburg (Staff), former soap actor, featuring in Hollyoaks as Toby Mills
- Joe Wigfield British middle distance long-distance and cross country runner. In 2026 he equalled the British national record in the 10k run and won the British national title on the track over 10,000 metres.
