= Nicola Hodson =

British businesswoman

Nicola Hodson (born 17 December 1966) is a British businesswoman, and the chief executive of IBM UK.

== Early life ==
Her father played rugby league, with his brother Brian, whilst working at a local crisp factory, later playing for Liverpool Stanley. She grew up on Liverpool Road in Widnes, with her sister, later moving to Tuson Drive. She trained with Halton Athletics Club, with her sister.

She attended St Michaels RC primary school in Widnes, and a girls RC direct grant grammar school, the Bellerive Convent Grammar School, in Liverpool.

In 1988 she gained a BSc in chemistry with Materials Science from the University of Liverpool. She gained a PhD in Laser Surface Engineering in January 1993 from the University of Liverpool. After her marriage, she lived in Meols, and gained an MBA in March 1997 from Lancaster University.

== Career ==
She worked with BNFL from 1991 to 1998. She worked with Microsoft from 2008.

=== IBM UK ===
In January 2023 she became chief executive of IBM in the UK.

== Personal life ==
She married in August 1992 to her partner from Upton, Merseyside at St Bede's Church, Widnes, afterwards visiting the US and Bahamas.

She remarried in 2001.
