= Florence Milnes =

British librarian (1893–1966)

Florence Milnes at the BBC

Florence Milnes MBE, (1893–1966), was a librarian who established the first reference library at the British Broadcasting Corporation (BBC) and ran it for more than thirty years. The library was her idea, and she persuaded the newly founded corporation that one was needed. She began the project in 1927 and by the time she retired in 1958 the library had five separate branches under her management. She was appointed a Member of the Order of the British Empire in 1943 for her contribution to the national broadcaster.

== Early years ==
Born in 1893, she was educated at a convent school in Liverpool, the FCJ College, but had no formal training in librarianship. During the First World War she worked at the Ministry of Munitions. In 1925 she started work at the BBC as an information assistant doing research for the Artistic Director on programme ideas, and in 1926 she spent some time with a hastily formed News Unit supplying information during the General Strike, in the absence of printed newspapers. (At first, the BBC did not see itself as a news organisation.) From her earliest days at the BBC she believed "...there was, and increasingly would be, the need for a library which would function in the same way as does a University Library for its students...". She pressed harder for this after her stint in the News Unit where her "conviction was strengthened on the need for a library, argued and contested, until finally [she] was given the green light". In January 1927, Milnes began the library and information service which would occupy her for the rest of her working life. Starting with an encyclopaedia, a Bible and a heap of press cuttings, she gradually built up a collection of on-site resources. She no longer needed to go for frequent walks from her office to the British Museum Reading Room, once essential to her for research.

== Establishing the library ==
Milnes provided research support for some of the main BBC radio offerings of the time: like drama, talks and quizzes. As well as building up reference resources, she developed other library services including lists of anniversaries which were popular with producers looking for a "peg" for programme topics. In 1932 the library moved from Savoy Hill to purpose-designed rooms in the newly built Broadcasting House. There was a quiet room for readers away from staff offices where the phones kept ringing with queries. A collection of card indexes organised topics from obituaries to poetry. Co-operation with other libraries of all kinds was an essential part of Milnes' work, partly because financial constraints limited the number of books she could purchase. She gradually established separate branches like a foreign language library for "External Services". A television-oriented branch was set up after the Second World War to provide "pictorial references" for designers working on historical and other plays. Milnes was disappointed when a completely independent news information service was established in 1934 to be run by Horatio Batchelor.

Within the BBC Milnes was a noticeable "personality", always wearing a suit with her hair in an Eton crop. Her friends, who called her Bill, described her high standards, helpfulness, kindness, and humour in obituaries. Yet this woman with a "formidable exterior", with her energy and commitment, sometimes showed signs of temper and bad manners. She herself admitted to tactlessness.

Most of the BBC's first information services were founded and run by women. Milnes was in a fairly welcoming workplace for women by the standards of the 1920s and 1930s, although her pay did not compare particularly well with that of some other women in similar roles. After starting on a weekly wage equivalent to £182 p.a., she soon became a salaried employee earning half as much again. She was refused a substantial raise in the late 1920s, and her salary reached £1,915 p.a. by 1958. As well as having a key role within the BBC, Milnes was an important figure in the Association of Special Libraries and Information Bureaux, ASLIB, from its earliest days in the 1920s.

== Legacy ==
By the time Milnes left the BBC in 1958 the library had more than 50 staff and 100,000 volumes as well as pictures, clippings etc. At the tea party marking her retirement the BBC Director General praised her as a "practical visionary" who had foreseen how much the BBC would depend on a good quality library. Historian Asa Briggs later said her library was "one of the biggest and best-executed tasks in the BBC's history". The Times said she had designed a service "for the very special demands of broadcasting", and assembled "one of the finest drama libraries in the country". Not only had she offered "willing help" to programme producers and researchers but she had also trained people who went on to be "first-class librarians in various parts of the world", and who were, like her, "content to remain behind the scenes", while "making a real contribution to programmes". In her later years she was no longer active but enjoyed the company of "constant friends" and listening to the radio. She died at the Hospital of St John and St Elizabeth on 25 Jan 1966.
