= William Henry Webster =

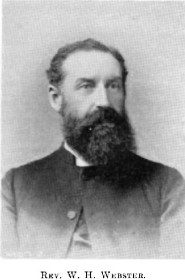
The Reverend William Henry Webster, 1902.

Reverend William Henry Webster (1 October 1850 – 1931) was born at Upton Hall, Cheshire. After a brief career in the navy, during which he saw service in Asia, Webster studied to become a priest and followed this vocation to his retirement. Rev. Webster married Mary Stubbs, the niece of the late Dr. Stubbs, Bishop of Oxford, in August 1875. They had a family of five children. Webster died in 1931, at Barton-on-Sea, Hampshire, England. While posted in New Zealand he became interested in sea-shells and established a reputation as a malacologist (the study of molluscs) and conchologist (the study of sea-shells). Several New Zealand molluscs are named after him and a collection of his shells can be found in the Auckland War Memorial Museum.

== The Websters of Upton ==
In 1798, John Webster, a farmer, bought the Upton manor house, Upton Hall, and title "Lord of the Manor". He was subsequently known Squire. His son William was a philanthropist and was widely popular. William's father married Elizabeth Matthews, ca. 1845, but she died sometime before 1861. The census of that year shows William married to Sophia Elizabeth Curme.

However William senior's eldest son, John Egerton Webster (William Henry's uncle) was not well liked. Having a fortune of some £8-9000 he married a young woman and they lived off the interest, but by 1843 he petitioned for insolvency, which could have landed him in prison. In the 1851 census it is the younger brother, William, William Henry's father who lives at Upton with his family. In 1861 John's wife took the extraordinary step of divorcing him on the grounds of cruelty. John Egerton is shown by the 1871 census to be an inmate of a poor house in Norwich, England.

The family sold Upton Hall in 1862, possibly to pay John Egerton's debts or possibly because the scandal has negatively impacted their social standing. This perhaps explains why William's son, William Henry joined the navy in 1864. He needed an income but his family could not provide him one.

== Naval career ==
Webster joined the Royal Navy as a midshipman in 1864 (aged 14). He served aboard HMS Pearl – a 17 gun, steam corvette of 1469 tons – from 5 May 1866, with brief periods of service on HMS Rattler (5 October – 22 December 1866), HMS Osprey (23 December 1866 – 2 January 1867) and HMS Agincourt (3 December 1870 – 14 April 1871).

Two logbooks covering the period 5 May 1866 to 14 April 1871 were lodged with the Auckland City Libraries by his daughter in 1943. The logbooks are accompanied by "impressive sketches and watercolours".

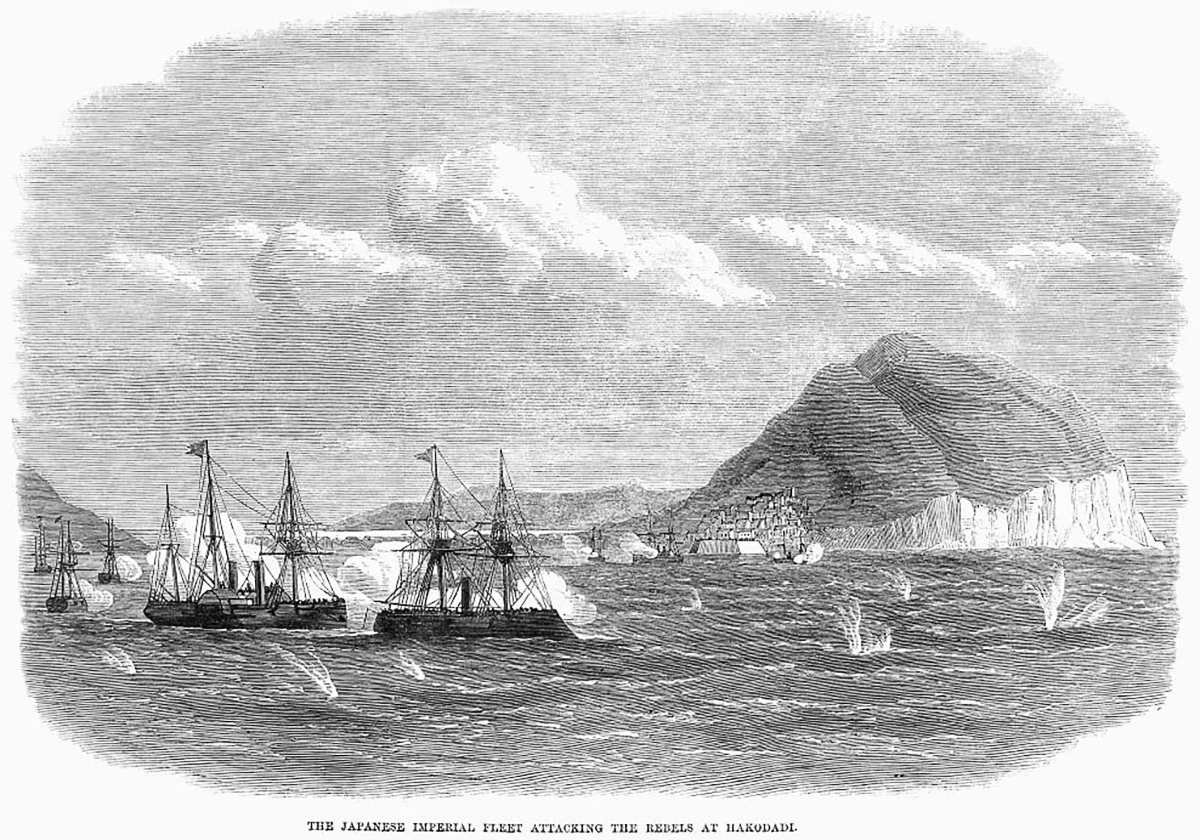
Naval Battle of Hakodate. Sketched by William Henry Webster in his midshipman's logbook.

Webster witnessed the Naval Battle of Hakodate (4 to 10 May 1869), and his sketch of it appeared in the Illustrated London News, 11 September 1869. He retired with a pension in 1873 and attended Cambridge University.

== Ecclesiastical career ==
Initially non-collegiate from 1874, Webster entered St John's College, Cambridge in 1875, and graduated with a Bachelor of Arts degree in 1877. He was ordained a deacon in 1875 and a priest in 1878. After holding various curacies in England, he was appointed chaplain at Bonn, from 1882 till 1889. From 1889 till 1892, he was Organising Secretary of the Additional Curates' Society. In 1892 Rev. Webster went to Tasmania, where he received the appointment of curate to Holy Trinity Church, Launceston, and held that position till 1896, when he was appointed vicar of Bothwell, Tasmania. He became Vicar of Waiuku, New Zealand in 1899. In 1902 he stepped down to concentrate on farming, and other activities, but was granted permission to officiate in the diocese of Auckland between 1903 and 1906. In 1909 he and his wife returned to England, leaving behind as least one of their children who settled in New Zealand. In England, William once again took posts as a priest before retiring, ca. 1922.

=== Ecclesiastical postings ===
- Curate (C.): West Exe, Devon, 1876–78
- C.: (Pitt's Portion) Tiverton, Devon, 1878–80
- C.: Westfield, Sussex, 1880–81
- C.: Cocking, Sussex, 1881–82
- Chaplain.: Bonn, Germany, 1882–89
- Organising Sec.: A.C.S. (Midland District) 1890–92 (Western District) 1892
- C.: Holy Trinity, Launceston, Tasmania, Australia, 1892–95
- Vicar: Sheffield, Tasmania, Australia, 1895–96
- Rector: Bothwell, Tasmania, Australia, 1896–99
- V: Waiuku, New Zealand, 1899–1902
- Officiate at Diocese, Auckland, New Zealand, 1903–06
- C.: St Mary's, Hoxton, London, 1910–12
- C.: St John's Hampstead, London, 1912–13
- R.: Bradden, Northamptonshire, 1913–22

== Malacology ==
Rev. Webster was also a noted malacologist. The fresh-water mussel Cucumerunio websteri and the deep-sea chiton Notoplax websteri were named for him. From at least 1901 to 1909 he was an active member of the Auckland Institute and Museum, and during this time made several donations of shells to the Auckland Museum, along with a coloured drawing of a Tethys tryoni (sea hare – current name Aplysia parvula). In 1929 he gifted his substantial collection of New Zealand and foreign shells to the new Auckland War Memorial Museum.

=== Publications ===
Transactions and Proceedings of the Royal Society of New Zealand

- Art. XVII.—Some, New Species of New Zealand Marine Shells, together with Remarks on some Non-marine Species, and some Additions to the "Index Faunœ." By Rev. W. H. Webster, B.A., from Volume 37, 1904
- Art. XXXVI.—Additions to the New Zealand Fauna By W. H. Webster, B.A., from Volume 38, 1905
- Art. XVI.—Additions to the New Zealand Molluscan Fauna. Webster, W. H., from Volume 40, 1907
- Art. XVI.—Results of Dredging on the Continental Shelf of New Zealand. Webster, W. H., from Volume 38, 1905

== Sources ==
- Biographical Etymology of Marine Organism Names (BEMON). http://www.bemon.loven.gu.se/
- Cambridge University Alumni Database – searched Sept 2017.
- Cyclopedia of New Zealand [AUCKLAND PROVINCIAL DISTRICT] 1902. New Zealand Electronic Text Archive | Te Pūhikotuhi o Aotearoa. Retrieved Sept 2017.
- Giles, K. (2003) The Logbooks of William Henry WEBSTER 1850–1931. Auckland-Waikato Historical Journal October 2003 No. 82, p. 5-8. (Citations are to an unpaginated typescript supplied by the author)
