= Robert Reid (Australian politician, born 1842) =

Australian politician (1842–1904)

The Honourable Robert Reid
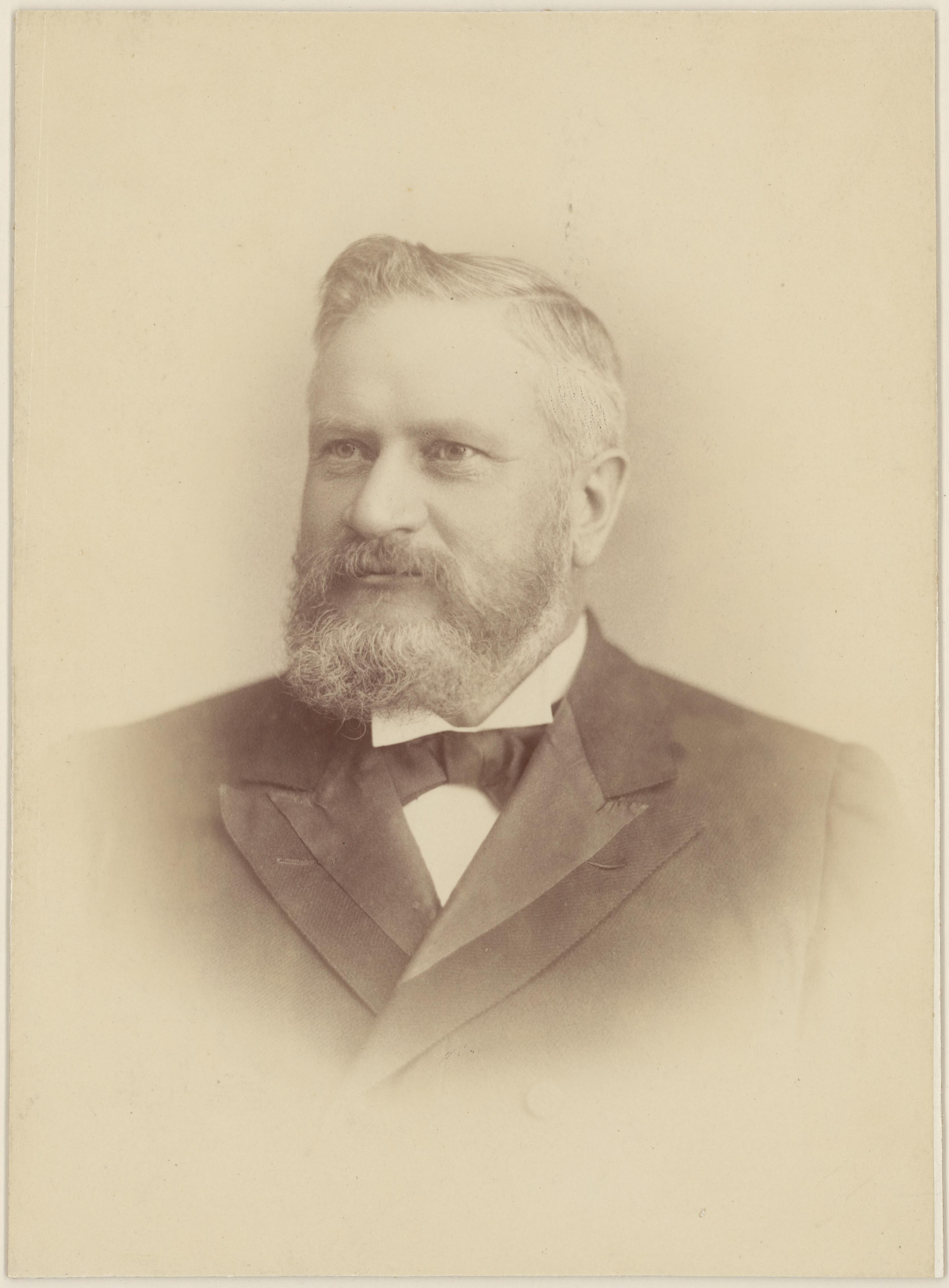

Senator for Victoria
- In office 21 January 1903 – 31 December 1903
- Preceded by: Sir Frederick Sargood

Personal details
- Born: 18 October 1842 Leven, Fife, Scotland
- Died: 12 May 1904 (aged 61) London, England
- Party: Free Trade
- Spouse: Mary Jane Clancy
- Children: at least 10
- Occupation: Businessman

Robert Reid (18 October 1842 – 12 May 1904) was an Australian businessman and politician. He established Robert Reid & Co., one of Australia's largest importing firms, and was prominent in Melbourne commercial circles. He was a member of the Victorian Legislative Council from 1892 to 1903 and was a government minister on two occasions. He also briefly filled a casual vacancy in the Senate in 1903.

== Early life ==
Reid was born on 18 October 1842 in Leven, Fifeshire, Scotland. He was the second son born to Catherine (née Lambert) and Robert Reid. His father was a stationer and bookseller.

Reid and his family migrated to Australia in 1855. Their ship Ralph Waller collided with an iceberg in the Southern Ocean, coming close to sinking. His father died six weeks after they arrived in Melbourne, "apparently as a result of trauma and illness after the ship's disastrous collision".

== Business career ==
In 1874, Reid established his own wholesale drapery importing firm in Flinders Lane, in partnership with John Adair and Edward Warne. Known as Warne & Reid from 1876, by 1881 the firm had 90 employees and opened a factory in Collingwood in 1882 with 250 employees. A Sydney branch was opened in the same year.

Reid bought out Warne in 1887 and renamed the business Robert Reid & Co., which became "one of the largest Australian importing businesses". It was reconstituted as a limited liability company and also had branches in Adelaide, Brisbane, London and Glasgow.

In 1891, after the death of Nunn, co-owner with Buckley of Buckley & Nunn store, Reid bought the business and sold it on in London in 1892 for £300,000 (equivalent to $49,000,000 in 2022).

== Colonial politics ==
Reid was elected to the Victorian Legislative Council in 1892 as one of the members for Melbourne Province. He was active in the National Association, a fundraising group associated with business interests, and was a supporter of free trade. He served as minister for defence and minister for health in James Brown Patterson's government from January 1893 to September 1894.

Reid declined the role of agent-general for Victoria but on visits to London acted as a de facto representative of the Victorian government. He returned to the ministry in June 1902 as minister for health and minister for public instruction in the government of William Irvine. He resigned from the Legislative Council in January 1903 upon his election to the Senate.

== Federal politics ==
Reid was an unsuccessful candidate for the Senate at the inaugural 1901 federal election. He stood as a Free Trade candidate and was opposed to women's suffrage. He supported "a White Australia yielding to coloured labour where necessary", including the continuation of Kanaka labour to support the Queensland sugar industry.

On 21 January 1903, Reid was elected by the parliament of Victoria to fill the casual vacancy caused by the death of Senator Frederick Sargood, another member of Melbourne's commercial elite. He was the first person to fill a casual vacancy in the Senate. Reid was not active on committees and spoke primarily on economic and defence matters. He did not seek re-election at the 1903 federal election, retiring at the end of Sargood's original term on 31 December 1903.

== Personal life ==
In 1865, Reid married Mary Jane Clancy, with whom he had four sons and six daughters. His daughter Isabelle was a veterinary surgeon. They acquired a small house and acreage in Deepdene (formerly Balwyn) in 1870, which they named Belmont.

Reid suffered from diabetes. He fell into a diabetic coma while on a trip to London in early 1904 and died at St. Ermin's Hotel on 12 May 1904. He was interred at Hampstead Cemetery and his estate was sworn for probate at £196,501 (equivalent to $35,000,000 in 2022).
