= Charlotte O'Conor Eccles =

Irish writer and journalist (1863–1911)

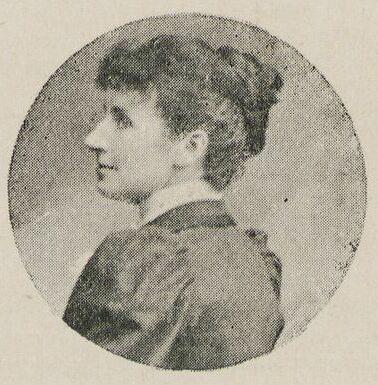
- Charlotte O'Conor Eccles in 1899
- Born: 1 November 1863; County Roscommon, Ireland
- Died: 1911 (aged 47–48); St John's Wood, London, UK
- Writing career
- Notable work: Aliens of the West

Charlotte O'Conor Eccles (1863–1911) was an Irish writer, translator and journalist, who spent her working life in London. Aliens of the West (1904) was said to be among "the best modern books of short stories on Ireland yet written."

== Life ==
Charlotte O'Conor Eccles was born in County Roscommon, Ireland, on 1 November 1863, the fourth daughter of Alexander O'Conor Eccles of Ballingard House, the founder of a home-rule newspaper, The Roscommon Messenger. She attended a Catholic grammar school, Upton Hall School FCJ, near Birkenhead and convents in Paris and Germany.

== Writings ==
Eccles later lived in London with her mother and sister, where after a number of setbacks she became a journalist in the London office of the New York Herald. She went on to become a staff member of the Daily Chronicle and the Star. She commented in an article in the June 1893 number of Blackwood's Magazine on "the immense difficulty a woman finds in getting into an office in any recognised capacity".

Eccles joined the agricultural reformer Sir Horace Plunkett in writing and lecturing around Ireland for the Department of Agriculture and Technical Instruction. Another of her Blackwood's Magazine articles, in December 1888, covered "Irish Housekeeping and Irish Customs in the Last Century".

Her first novel, The Rejuvenation of Miss Semaphore (London: Jarrold & Sons, 1897), was published in 1897 under the male pseudonym Hal Godfrey: "This hilarious novel tells of a middle-aged woman who drinks too much of an elixir of youth, causing pandemonium in the... boarding-house where she lives with her sister." She also contributed to a number of periodicals, including the Irish Monthly, the Pall Mall Magazine, the American Ecclesiastical Review and the Windsor Magazine.

Eccles's other books include Aliens of the West (London: Cassell, 1904) and The Matrimonial Lottery (London: Eveleigh Nash, 1906). An obituary in The Times described Aliens of the West as "one of the best modern books of short stories on Ireland yet written".

== Death ==
Eccles died in 1911 at her home in St John's Wood, London of cerebral thrombosis after a reported nervous breakdown.
