= Chris Pilgrim =

English rugby union player

- Born: Chris Pilgrim; 13 January 1986 (age 40) Birkenhead, Merseyside, England
- Height: 1.78 m (5 ft 10 in)
- Weight: 87 kg (13 st 10 lb)
- School: St Anselms College
- University: Loughborough

Rugby union career
- Position: Scrum-half
Senior career
Years	Team	Apps	(Points)
2009–2014	Newcastle Falcons		
- Yorkshire Carnegie

Chris Pilgrim (born 13 January 1986 in Birkenhead) is a retired English rugby union player, his position is scrum-half. He played for Newcastle Falcons in the Guinness Premiership. He made his debut in 2009 at Welford Road against Leicester Tigers and went on to play another five seasons and 88 games for the club He finished his professional career with Yorkshire Carnegie. Following his professional career he played for Caldy RFC, helping them to the Championship in 2022. After learning the ropes at Caldy with coaching he has now returned to his original roots, coaching Anselmians in Level 5. He attended St Anselms College Birkenhead and Loughborough University where he was rewarded with a sports scholarship and full Loughborough colours. Whilst at Loughborough he gained representative honours for England Students and England Counties and also England Saxons.
