= Harrytown Catholic High School =

Coordinates: 53.4133°N 2.1047°W

Location
- Harrytown, Romiley; Stockport, Greater Manchester, SK6 3BU; United Kingdom

Information
- Type: Voluntary aided
- Motto: Laborare et Orare (to work and to pray)
- Religious affiliation: Roman Catholic
- Established: 1913 (as a convent school)
- Founders: The Sisters of Charity of Our Lady of Evron
- Local authority: Stockport
- Department for Education URN: 106143 Tables
- Ofsted: Reports
- Headteacher: Keith Turmeau
- Staff: 7
- Gender: Co-educational
- Age: 07 to 45
- Enrolment: 804
- Houses: Aquinas Catherine Claire Francis Savio Teresa
- Website: https://www.harrytownschool.org

Harrytown Catholic High School is a voluntary aided Catholic secondary school, situated in Romiley near Stockport, England. It is designated as a Specialist Science College. Originally a convent school based at Harrytown Hall, it became a co-educational Catholic secondary school in 1978 and moved to new accommodation. The buildings have been modernised since and today Harrytown serves a wide catchment area, for seven feeder Catholic primary schools in the east of Stockport. The school has a house system, where houses compete with each other. Originally, the school had four houses named after the English Martyrs – Fisher, Campion, Moore and Beckett. This has now extended to six houses named after Saints linked to the school. The school is one of three Roman Catholic high schools in Stockport, and one of two within the Diocese of Shrewsbury in Stockport

== History ==
Harrytown originated in 1913 as a Catholic convent school at Harrytown Hall, a former manor house that was built in 1671. It was maintained by the Convent of the Nativity of the Sisters of Charity of Notre Dame d'Evron until 1978. The hall was converted into flats in the 1980s,. The school was originally housed in a stable block belonging to Harrytown Hall. In the intervening years since the schools inception, the school has been much improved and enlarged, although the original stable block still forms a small part of the current campus. The school became a co-educational comprehensive Catholic school in 1978, and has been maintained by the Diocese of Shrewsbury ever since. In 2013 Harrytown celebrated its centenary. Mass was celebrated by Mark Davies, Roman Catholic Bishop of Shrewsbury, 100 years to the day of the opening of the convent school. Events took place marking the centenary throughout the year culminating with the opening of the Centenary Chapel on 17 December. Davies blessed and celebrated Mass in the Chapel which was attended by local Clergy, Governors, local Headteachers, including Harrytown's then future Headteacher, Keith Turmeau. All staff and students joined the Mass through a live television link in the school hall and library.

== Accommodation ==
The school is situated in modern accommodation. The original school includes science labs, design and technology rooms, a drama studio and an assembly hall, in addition to offices and administration areas. An extensive building programme was introduced in 1995 resulting in a new sports hall, library, music rooms, business studies classrooms, and food technology rooms. Additionally, the science labs were upgraded. Further improvements in 2002 included new art rooms, MFL classrooms, new ICT rooms and further improvements to the science labs. ICT has been integrated into all parts of the school, with wireless internet and interactive whiteboards in most classrooms. The school also includes tennis courts and playing fields, along with outdoor areas available for work in areas such as science and geography.

== Academics ==
The school day is structured into five lessons, plus breaks, lunch and registration. With lessons lasting one hour each, the entire school day is six hours and 40 minutes, from 8:55 am to 3:35 pm. The five minutes between 3:30 pm and 3:35 pm are designated as "Prayer Time". The timetable runs on a two-week cycle.

From Year 7 to 9, students share similar subjects, and most are taught in mixed ability groups. Students are provided with learning support as required. In Year 9, students choose optional subjects to study at GCSE level or equivalent, in addition to compulsory subjects.

=== Enrolment ===
The school has a capacity limit of 804 students, and most of its students come from the seven feeder primary schools: St Bernadette's, St Christopher's, St Joseph's, St Mary's, St Peter's, St Philip's and St Simon's. Many students move on to further education, with the majority attending Aquinas College in Heaviley.

=== Exam results ===
Harrytown generally gets exam results higher than the national average, and it has appeared in The Observer's list of the top 100 state schools and The Times Good Schools Guide. In 2009, 83% of students achieved grade C or above in five or more GCSE subjects, including Maths and English. The school also ranks very highly in ICT and Science. It ranks higher than most other secondary schools in the borough.

== Notable former pupils ==
- Danny Miller (actor) (born 1991), actor, best known for his role as Aaron Livesy in British soap opera Emmerdale
- Jack Shorrock (born 2007), footballer, best known as the youngest player in Port Vale and EFL League Two history

=== Harrytown Convent Girls' School ===
- Dame Hilary Mantel (1952–2022), writer and novelist
- Joanne Whalley (born 1962), actress

== See also ==
- Hollies Convent FCJ School
