= Detta O'Cathain, Baroness O'Cathain =

British politician (1938–2021)

The Right Honourable The Baroness O'Cathain OBE
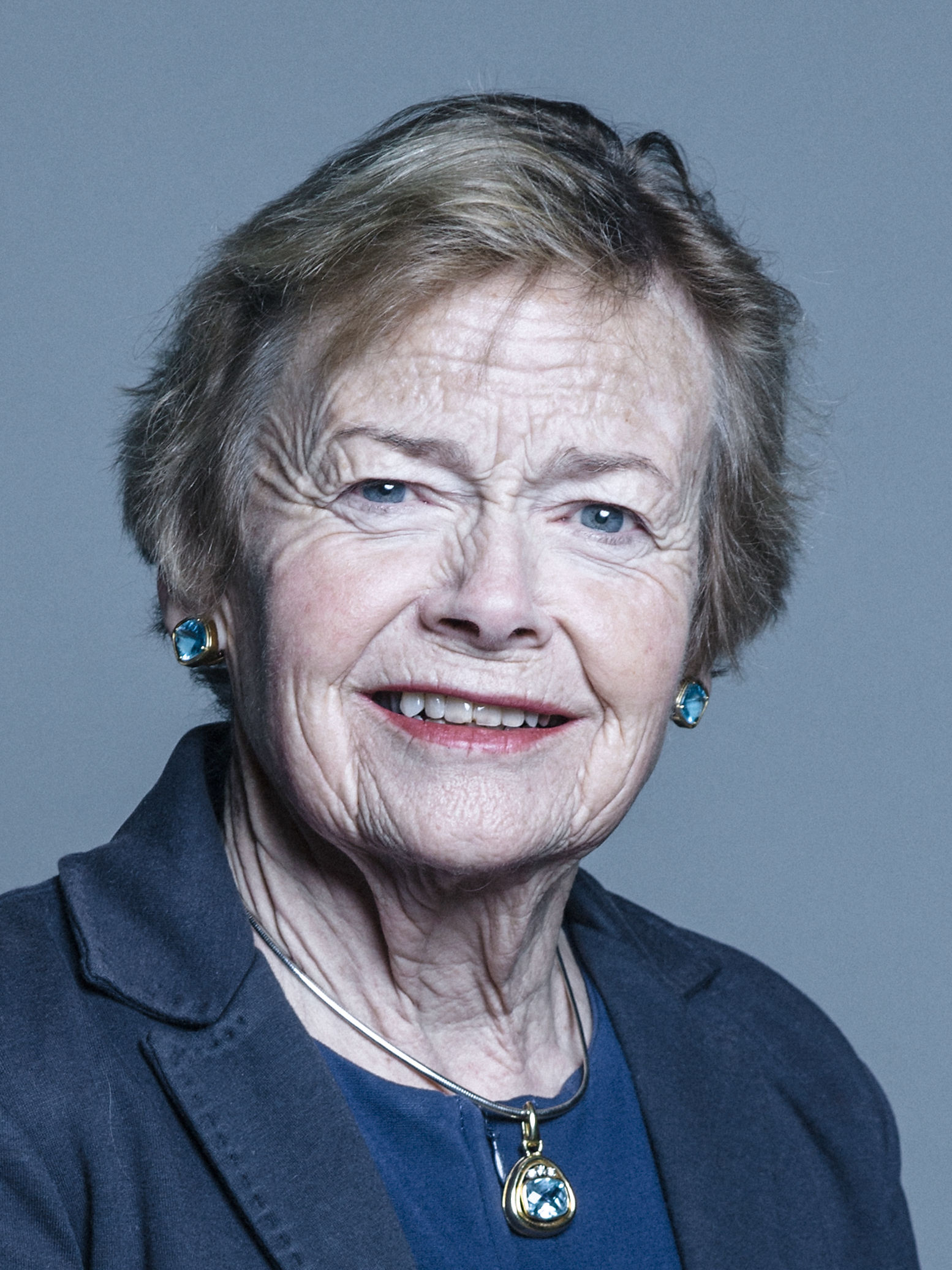
- Official portrait, 2018
- Born: Detta O'Cathain; 2 February 1938; Cork, Cork, Ireland
- Died: 23 April 2021 (aged 83); Arundel, West Sussex, England
- Political party: Conservative
- Spouse: William Bishop (m. 1963; died 2001)

Member of the House of Lords
- Lord Temporal
- Life peerage 21 June 1991 – 23 April 2021

Detta O'Cathain, Baroness O'Cathain, OBE (/ˌoʊkəˈhɔɪn/; 2 February 1938 – 23 April 2021) was an Irish-born British businesswoman and Conservative politician.

== Early life and education ==
Margaret M. B. O Cathain was born in Cork, daughter of Caoimhghin O Cathain, of Dublin, and Margaret (née Prior). She was educated at Laurel Hill Convent in Limerick, before receiving a BA at University College Dublin and emigrating to England.

== Business career ==
O Cathain was a director of many companies. She served as non-executive director of Midland Bank from 1984 to 1993, of Tesco from 1985 to 2000, and of British Airways from 1993 to 2004. She served as managing director of the Milk Marketing Board from 1984 to 1989 and of the Barbican Centre from 1990 to 1995. She described both the London Symphony Orchestra (LSO) and the Royal Shakespeare Company (RSC), resident at the Barbican, as "arty-farty types", and opposed public subsidy. Such was the press and public reaction that she was obliged to seek a vote of confidence from the LSO and RSC; failing to gain it, she resigned, and was succeeded by John Tusa, whom a historian of the LSO described as "steeped in culture", and the danger that the concert hall would become a conference centre was averted. O Cathain was also a director of BNP/Paribas (UK) and Allders. In the 1983 New Year Honours she was appointed an Officer of the Order of the British Empire (OBE).

== Political career ==
O'Cathain made many appearances on the BBC's Question Time during the 1980s. She was made a life peer as Baroness O'Cathain, of The Barbican in the City of London, on 21 June 1991 and sat in the House of Lords on the Conservative benches. She served on a number of committees within the House, including the Constitution Committee and the Economic Affairs Committee. She also sat on the European Union Committee, chairing the Sub-Committee on Internal Market, Infrastructure and Employment.

She was known for her socially conservative views, in particular her efforts to retain the ban on same-sex couples from adopting, and had taken on a leadership role against gay rights after the death of Lady Young.

In 2004 O'Cathain denied that her decision to step down from the board of British Airways was connected with a threatened boycott of the airline by gay rights group Stonewall. Gay rights supporters took exception to what was described as her attempted "wrecking" amendment of the civil partnerships bill. She responded that her amendment was "nothing to do with homosexuals at all." In 2009, she proposed a law criminalising the possession of "extreme pornographic writings", similar to the recently passed law on images.

In 2014 O'Cathain was selected to chair the House of Lords inquiry into civil use of remotely piloted aircraft systems (RPAS), devices commonly referred to as drones.

== Personal life ==
O'Cathain married William Ernest John Bishop in 1963. He died in 2001.

She died at her home in Arundel, West Sussex, following a short illness, in April 2021. Baroness Janet Fookes paid tribute to her, saying that she was "never afraid to speak her mind".

== Sources ==
- Morrison, Richard (2004). Orchestra: The LSO: A Century of Triumph and Turbulence. London: Faber & Faber. ISBN 978-0-57-121584-3.
