= Christ's sake =

Christ's sake may refer to:

- Christ's sake, a colloquial phrase used as a profanity
- Christ's Sake, American Christian rock band

== See also ==
- For Christ's Sake (disambiguation)
