= FCJ College Benalla =

Coordinates: 36°33′19.5″S 145°58′42.2″E

FCJ College
- Benalla, Victoria; Australia

Information
- School type: Independent, co-educational, secondary day school
- Motto: Pro Deo Semper – Latin for "For God Always"
- Established: 1900
- Principal: Joseph Mount
- Grades: 7–12
- Website: www.fcjbenalla.catholic.edu.au

FCJ College Benalla is a Catholic college based in Benalla, Victoria, Australia. It caters for Year 7 to VCE and services nearly 500 students with many staff.

== History ==
The school was established in 1900 by the Faithful Companions of Jesus, and 2015 marked 115 years of the college. In 2025 the college celebrated its 125th anniversary.

== Sport ==
The school has been a member of the Catholic All Schools Sports Association (CAS) from 1999 until 2010. Plans are being made to reintroduce the CAS sports days to students.

The school also holds annual intra-school sporting events, namely the Swimming Carnival (held at the Benalla Aquatic Centre early in the year) and the Athletics Carnival (usually held mid-year at Churchill Reserve).

FCJ is a part of the Round-Robin sports days that are held across areas of Victoria, this gives the students a chance to show their sporting abilities with other people from the state.

== New buildings ==
The school has also added some new Buildings for the current Year 9 students.

The school has had recent renovations to the two science labs to fit in more sessions. It has an extensive chemical storage.

The school also has a new language and VCE study center which was opened at the end of 2011.

FCJ opened a Trade Training Centre in 2013 it specialises in Engineering.

In 2017 FCJ warmly welcomed a new Flexible Learning Space and Project Based Learning to the school.
