= Harrytown Hall =

Coordinates: 53.4127°N 2.1051°W

Harrytown Hall is a former manor house in Bredbury, Stockport, England.

The first hall was built in the 15th century by Harry Bruckshaw. In 1671, it was demolished and rebuilt by John Bruckshaw. John's initials were carved along with his wife's, Sarah, over the front door along with the year. The hall was built in a Gothic style, and it remains well-preserved.

For many years the Bruckshaw's owned the estate, and later the Fosters and the Waltons, but in 1913 the hall became a convent school. In 1978, the school moved to new premises and became Harrytown Catholic High School. The building is now flats.
