= Gumley House Convent School =

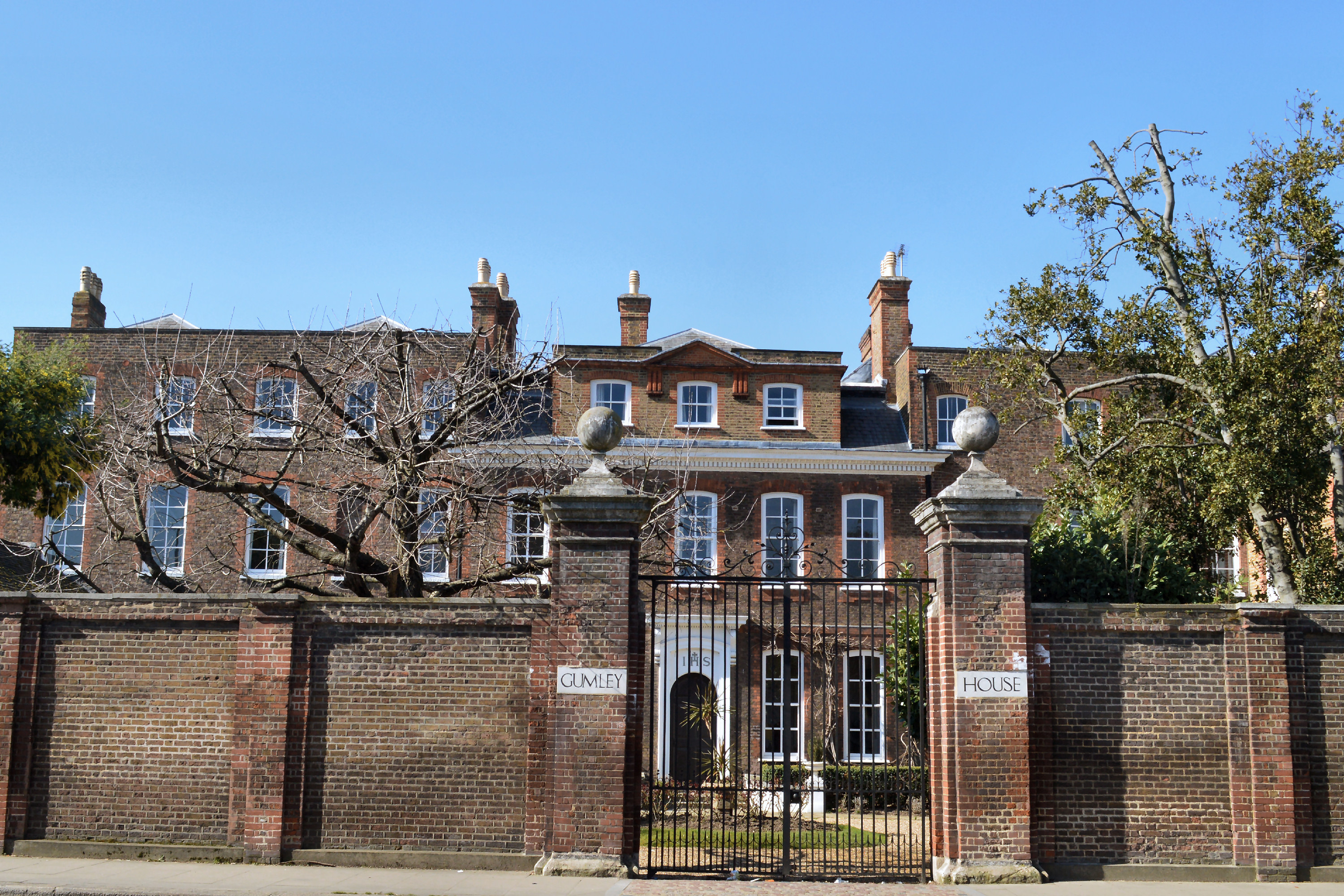
- Gumley House Convent School, Isleworth.

Location
- St John's Road; Isleworth, TW7 6XF; England; 51.4695°N 0.3289°W

Information
- Type: Academy
- Motto: Latin: Vive Ut Vivas (Live that you may have life)
- Religious affiliation: Roman Catholic
- Established: 1841; 185 years ago
- Founders: Sisters of the Faithful Companions of Jesus
- Local authority: Hounslow
- Department for Education URN: 137928 Tables
- Ofsted: Reports
- Chair: Helen Gill
- Head teacher: Stephen Byrne
- Gender: Girls; Mixed (Sixth Form)
- Age: 11 to 18
- Enrolment: 1,187 (2013-14)
- Houses: C, F, J, M, R, T
- Colours: Blue, Brown, Gold
- Website: http://www.gumleyhouse.com

Gumley House Convent School is a Roman Catholic secondary school for girls ages 11 to 18 in Isleworth, Hounslow, West London. The school has specialisms in Business & Enterprise and Languages. On 1 March 2012 it became an academy.

The school has a joint sixth form with two other Catholic secondary schools in the borough: Gunnersbury Boys' School and the mixed St Mark's Catholic School. It also has links with the local parish church Our Lady of Sorrows and St Bridget of Sweden Church down the street.

== History ==
Gumley House Convent School traces its history to a parochial charity school, the first of its kind in Isleworth, founded by Sisters of the Faithful Companions of Jesus (FCJ). The Sisters had arrived from France and bought Gumley House in 1841. The Catholic Directory, Ecclesiastical Register, and Almanac described the school as offering a "continental education". French was primarily spoken as the Sisters were from France but Italian, German and English were also taught.

The convent originally had two sections: a boarding school for upper class girls and a charity school for younger poor children of the local parish. These nuns also played a role in the founding or development of other Catholic schools in Isleworth and the present-day borough. Due to the pressing need for a secondary school, St Mary's High School for older girls was opened in 1890. In 1922 it became St Mary's College, the first Catholic school in Middlesex to be recognised by the Board of Education. When Poles Convent (merged with St Edmund's College, Ware during the 1970s) in Hertfordshire was founded the following year, boarders from Gumley House and St Mary's High moved there. Pupils and staff at Gumley House were evacuated during World War II and returned after the war ended.

The post-war period was a time of rapid change and development. Gumley House became a grammar school in 1959 and then solely a secondary school when its primary section moved out in the late sixties. The primary school became part of the current St Mary's Catholic Primary School. From 1968 boarders were no longer accepted. During the 1970s, new buildings were added and the campus expanded. It turned comprehensive in 1976 after the tripartite system was abolished. The school is under the trusteeship of the order and the headteachers have been Sisters up until 2012.

=== Gumley House ===
The original house was built by John Gumley, cabinet maker by appointment to Kings George I and George II. The name Gumley is thought to have originated from a French word (Gommele, or Gautchmondley). After Gumley's death in 1728, the house passed to his second son John as decreed in his will. John Gumley Senior's eldest daughter Anna Maria and her husband William Pulteney, 1st Earl of Bath lived at the house for a period, during which it played host to famous figures of the time including poet Alexander Pope, writer and politician Joseph Addison and future Prime Minister William Pitt ("the Elder"). After the death of their mother, the house's ownership eventually went to Anna Maria's younger sister Laetitia, wife of the general Lord Lake. It changed hands a number of times before it was bought by Marie-Madeleine d'Houët, founder of the FCJ. The house is now a Grade II* listed building.

== Academics ==
Gumley House was given the Special Recognition Award by the SSAT in recognition of pupils' achievement in the 2011 GCSEs.

== Notable former pupils ==
- Princess Marguerite Adélaïde of Orléans (1846-1893) - daughter of Prince Louis, Duke of Nemours
- Ellen Willmott (1858-1934) - horticulturist
- Polly Neate (b. 1966) - chief executive of the homelessness charity Shelter
- Ellie Beaven (b. 1980) - actress
