= Laurel Hill Coláiste =

Laurel Hill Coláiste FCJ

Location
- Limerick, Ireland
- Coordinates: 52.6550°N 8.6364°W

Information
- Former name: Laurel Hill Convent
- Type: Secondary school
- Religious affiliation: Catholic
- Established: 1840s
- Founder: Marie Madeleine Victoire de Bonnault d'Houet
- Gender: Girls only
- Enrollment: 400+ (2019)
- Language: Irish
- Website: laurelhillcolaistefcj.ie

Laurel Hill Coláiste FCJ (Irish: Coláiste Cnoc na Labhras), formerly known as Laurel Hill Convent, is an all-girls secondary school in Limerick, Ireland where all subjects are taught in Irish (gaelcholáiste). The school has around 400 students and has been ranked the top secondary school in Ireland for six years in a row.

== History ==
The school was founded in the 1840s by Sisters Faithful Companions of Jesus (FCJ) and was known as Laurel Hill Convent. In 1935 the school switched to teaching all subjects in Irish when there was a push by the government to revive the Irish language through schools.

== Academic results ==
For six years straight, 2014–2019, The Sunday Times Best Schools Guide ranked Laurel Hill Coláiste FCJ as the top secondary school in Ireland with 95.2% of its students going on to university.

== Notable alumnae ==
- Neasa Hourigan, Green Party politician
- Detta O'Cathain, Baroness O'Cathain, Irish-born British life peer
- Dolores O'Riordan, lead singer of The Cranberries
- Kate O’Brien, writer

== See also ==
- Education in the Republic of Ireland
- Gaeloideachas — Irish national organisation supporting the development of Irish-medium immersion schools
