= Belle Bruce Reid =

Australian veterinarian

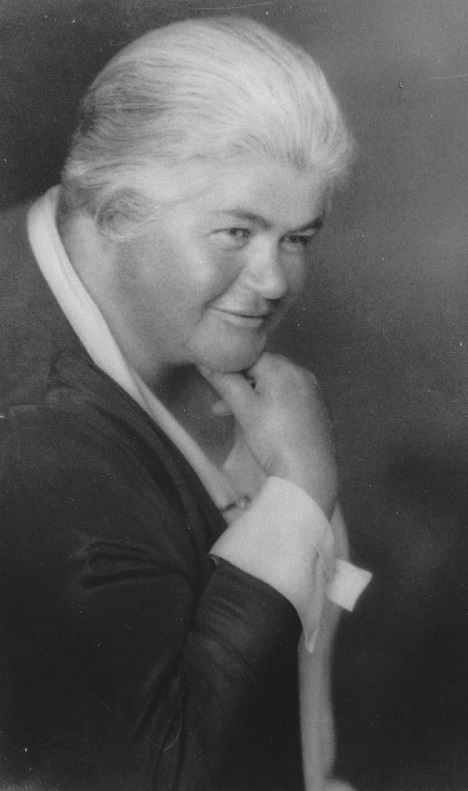
- Born: Isabelle Bruce Reid; 21 December 1883; Melbourne, Victoria, Australia
- Died: 13 December 1945 (aged 61); Canterbury, Victoria, Australia
- Occupations: veterinarian, cattle breeder, dog breeder, farmer, horse breeder
- Known for: first qualified veterinarian in Australia

Isabelle Bruce "Belle" Reid (21 December 1883 – 13 December 1945) was an Australian veterinarian. She was the first woman to qualify as a veterinarian in Australia, and established a practice in Balwyn, Victoria.

== Early life ==
Reid was born in 1883 in Melbourne, Victoria, and was the youngest of ten children. Her mother was Mary Jane Clancy and her father Robert Reid, born in Scotland, was a wealthy merchant and Victorian politician. She grew up in the Melbourne suburb of Balwyn where she developed an interest in the care of animals, especially horses, and attended school at Genazzano FCJ College. She originally aspired to pursue a career in singing, but her parents considered such a pursuit inappropriate for a woman of her class, so Reid enrolled in the Melbourne Veterinary College instead in 1902.

== Veterinary career ==
Reid graduated from the Melbourne Veterinary College in 1906—she was one of five students who sat the final-year examinations and was the only one to pass. She was registered with the Veterinary Board of Victoria the same year, and was considered the first woman in the world to formally qualify as a veterinary surgeon. She was the first Australian woman to train as a veterinarian, and one of only three women to be receive a veterinary education in Australia in the first 50 years after the Victorian Veterinary Register was established in 1888.

Following her graduation, Reid established a private veterinary practice, the Balwyn Veterinary Surgery, near her childhood home in the house where the Reid family's chauffeur had once lived. She continued to run the practice until her retirement in 1923.

== Later life ==
Reid moved from Balwyn to Bundoora, another suburb of Melbourne, in 1925. She lived on a farm that she called "Blossom Park" on an estate which she and her sister had purchased in 1911. There she bred horses, cattle and dogs, and constructed stables and a dairy to accommodate them. She regularly exhibited her animals at shows run by the Royal Agricultural Society of Victoria. She died from coronary thrombosis on 13 December 1945 in Canterbury, Victoria.

== Legacy ==
In 1996, Reid was inducted into the National Pioneer Women's Hall of Fame in Alice Springs. In 2006, the centenary of her registration as a veterinary practitioner, the University of Melbourne Faculty of Veterinary and Agricultural Sciences—which succeeded the Melbourne Veterinary College in 1908—awarded the Belle Bruce Reid Medal to 100 notable women veterinarians. She was inducted onto the Victorian Honour Roll of Women in 2007.
