= Vaucluse College =

Vaucluse College FCJ

Location
- Richmond, Victoria; Australia
- Coordinates: 37°49′15″S 144°59′52″E

Information
- Type: Independent, single-sex and day
- Motto: Latin: Ad Altiora (To Higher Things)
- Denomination: Roman Catholic, FCJ Sisters
- Established: 1882
- Closed: 2000
- Colours: Bottle green, navy blue and white
- Website: Vaucluse Past Students Association

Vaucluse College FCJ in Richmond, Victoria, Australia was founded in 1882 by the Faithful Companions of Jesus. The school was originally known as Mount St Joseph College and later was changed to Vaucluse College FCJ.

The main buildings of the college including the convent were designed by the architect GW Vanheems and constructed in stages between 1897 and 1904 to supplement the 'Eurolie' building already on site. These buildings, including the small gatehouse are listed as being of historical significance to the Richmond Hill area by the Heritage Council of Victoria. At various times, the college consisted of a junior school (age 5–11), a senior school which offered matriculation and accommodation for boarders. The school officially closed on 8 December 2000 due to changing demographics in the inner-city Melbourne region.

The Vaucluse site is currently used as the Waterford campus for St Kevin's College.

== House system ==
The students of Vaucluse College were divided into four houses that competed against each other in three areas: Athletics, Swimming and Performing Arts.

These houses were named:

- Byrne (Yellow)
- Daly (Red)
- D'Houet (Blue): in honour of Marie-Madeleine d'Houët, Foundress of FCJ Sisters
- Lardner (Green)

== Curriculum ==
Vaucluse College provided secondary education for girls between Years 7-12 including VCE (Victorian Certificate of Education). The teaching was primarily performed by a mixed sex staff supplemented by a small number of Sisters from the FCJ convent on campus.

Students at the college benefited from a very broad curriculum that covered five main fields of study: Science, Arts, Humanities, Business and Sport.

Within these streams the following subjects were taught at a senior level:

- Science: Biology, Physics, Chemistry and Mathematics (including both specialist and non-specialist subjects).
- Arts: Drama, Music, Art (including Textiles and Ceramics).
- Humanities: English, English Literature, Social Studies, Religious Education, French and Italian.
- Business: Economics, Legal Studies, Accounting and Computing.
- Sport: Physical Education and Health.

== Co-curriculum ==
Students of Vaucluse were also able to participate in a range of additional activities including three choirs (Vaucluse College Choir, Senior College Choir & Madrigal Group), Vaucluse Debating Team, Wind Orchestra, Tennis and Taekwondo. Many of these groups competed successfully at inter-school competitions against other Victorian secondary schools.

== Associated schools ==
Seven years after the founding of the original college and convent in Richmond, in 1889 Genazzano FCJ College was established as a sister school in nearby Kew to accommodate boarding students from country areas.
