= Julia Zaetta =

Australian journalist and magazine editor

- Born: Julia Anita Zaetta; Mildura, Victoria
- Education: Genazzano FCJ College
- Alma mater: University of Melbourne
- Occupations: Magazine editor Journalist
- Known for: Better Homes and Gardens (non-consecutively 1985 – present); Family Circle (1986–1990); Women's Weekly (2005–06); Numerous other magazines and books for Murdoch Magazines and Pacific Publications (2000–present)

Julia Anita Zaetta (/ˈzeɪɛtə/; born) is an Australian journalist and magazine editor. She was editor of Better Homes and Gardens and Family Circle for Pacific Magazines, and has been involved in the Better Homes and Gardens show on the Seven Network.

== Education ==
After attending Genazzano FCJ College in Melbourne, Victoria, she studied at the University of Melbourne, gaining a Bachelor of Arts degree. Whilst at university, she worked as a book editor for Hawthorn Press.

== Career ==
=== Magazines ===
Her magazine career began with Australian Home Journal. She has been editor of:

- Better Homes and Gardens
- Family Circle
- Diabetic Living
- New Woman
- The Australian Women's Weekly
