= Carla van Raay =

Australian writer

- Born: 1938 (age 87–88); Tilburg, Netherlands
- Occupations: Author, counselor, former nun, teacher & call girl
- Notable work: God's Callgirl

Carla van Raay (born 1938) is an Australian author, counselor and former nun, teacher and call girl.

== Biography ==
Born in Tilburg, Netherlands, van Raay moved with her family to Australia in the 1950s. Her father obtained work as a gardener at a convent school in Kew, Melbourne, run by the Sisters, Faithful Companions of Jesus, founded in early 19th-century France. Through this employment, he was able to have her enrolled as a student at the school. As a child she suffered sexual abuse from her father, from ages 3 to 12.

After graduation she joined the Sisters who ran the school as a nun. The order sent her the UK to train as a teacher. Once trained, she taught in Brussels. She felt isolated as a nun, and in 1969 she obtained permission from the Vatican to leave.

After leaving the order, van Raay worked as a teacher in one of the biggest schools in Melbourne. Van Raay was soon married to a Scotsman, and they had a daughter. She later had an affair with a 19 year old and the marriage ended. She had a second daughter with another partner. Living in Perth, and with a young family to support, van Raay turned to prostitution in 1973. Initially she worked as an escort, as she had been naive about sex during her education. After 3 months, once she had gained some experience, she set up her own massage service. Van Raay worked as a prostitute on and off for 18 years by which time she was 52 years old.

Her memoir, God's Callgirl, documents her childhood and career as sex worker, ending with her decision to leave that occupation. She was 65 years old at the time of the book's publication and a grandmother. The book sold 500,000 copies and has been published in 7 countries. She later wrote a sequel documenting that part of her life titled Desire. In 2016 she wrote Healing from Abuse: A Practical Spiritual Guide.

Van Raay now works as a counselor and healer for victims of sexual abuse.

== Published works ==
- Raay, Carla Van (2006). God's Callgirl: One Woman's Incredible Journey from the Convent to the Massage Parlour. Ebury Press. ISBN 9780091913687.
- Raay, Carla Van (2008). Desire: Awakening God's Woman. HarperCollins. ISBN 9780732285845.
- Raay, Carla Van (2008). The Price of Passion. Ebury Publishing. ISBN 9781407022604.
- Raay, Carla van (2016). Healing from Abuse: A Practical Spiritual Guide. John Hunt Publishing. ISBN 9781785352683.

=== Short essays ===
- Rediscovering The Art Of Blessing
- Insights Into Prostitution
