= Faithful Companions of Jesus =

Roman Catholic female congregation

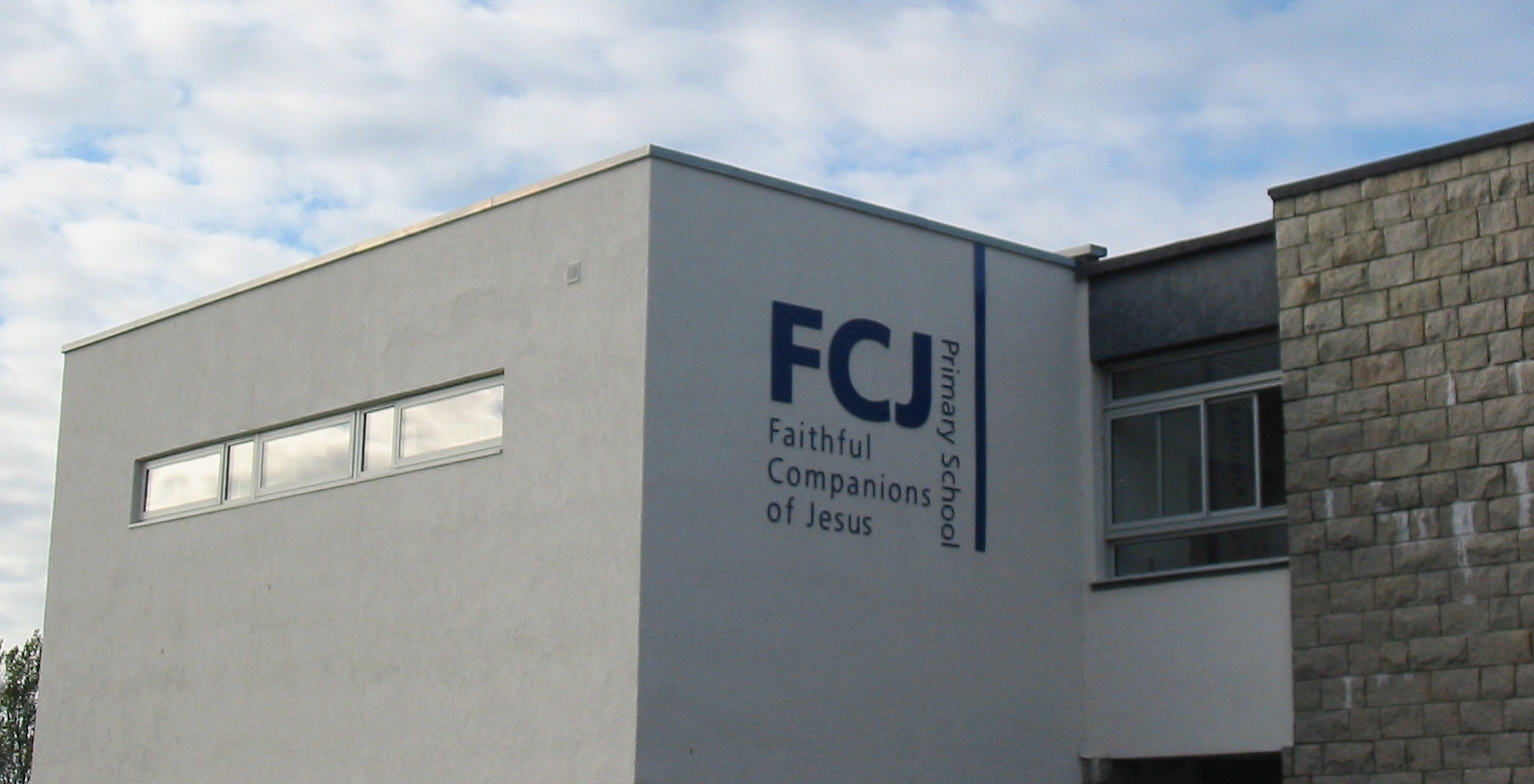
FCJ Primary School, Jersey

The Faithful Companions of Jesus Sisters (FCJ Sisters, French: Fidèles compagnes de Jésus) is a Christian religious institute of the Roman Catholic Church directly subject to the Pope. It was founded in Amiens in France in 1820 by Marie Madeleine de Bonnault d'Houët.

== Service ==
The FCJ sisters can be found in the Americas, Asia, Australia and Europe.

== In Australia ==
The FCJ sisters first arrived in Australia in 1882 and soon founded a school in Richmond, an inner suburb in Melbourne. Vaucluse College FCJ was soon at capacity, so land was purchased in Kew. They built a new convent and boarding school which marked the establishment of Genazzano FCJ College. In 1900 the Sisters set up a school in Benalla called FCJ College and in 1968 founded Stella Maris Convent and boarding school in Frankston, Victoria. The Stella Maris Convent and Vaucluse College FCJ have since closed.

Today, FCJ communities exist around the country.

In 2002 the Sisters joined with those in Indonesia and the Philippines to form a new province—the Province of Asia-Australia. New foundations are to be established elsewhere in South East Asia.

== In literature ==
An interesting perspective on the FCJ sisters is given in God's Callgirl, the autobiography of Carla van Raay (Australia, 2004) in which the author describes joining the institute at the age of 18 in 1956, and her subsequent 12 years as a novice and sister, before voluntarily leaving at the age of 30. Vaucluse College FCJ, Genazzano FCJ College and Benalla are all mentioned in the book. This period coincided with Vatican II, which resulted in a number of strict rules being relaxed.

== Schools ==
Sourced from the fcjsisters website.

=== Australia ===
- Genazzano FCJ College, Melbourne
- FCJ College Benalla, Benalla, Victoria
- Vaucluse College, Richmond, Victoria (closed 2000)

=== Europe ===
==== Belgium ====
- St. John's International School, Waterloo (until its sale in 2016)

==== Ireland ====
- FCJ Secondary, Bunclody
- Laurel Hill Coláiste, Limerick
- Laurel Hill Secondary School, Limerick

==== Jersey ====
- FCJ Primary School, St Saviour, Jersey

==== United Kingdom ====
England

- Bellerive FCJ Catholic College, Liverpool
- Gumley House Convent School, London
- Maria Fidelis RC Convent School, London
- Newlands School, Middlesbrough (merged with St David's School in 2009)
- Poles Convent, Ware, Hertfordshire (closed in 1986; merged with St Edmund's College)
- St Joseph's Convent, Hartlepool (now English Martyrs School and Sixth Form College)
- Upton Hall School, Upton, Merseyside
- Hollies Convent FCJ School, Manchester. Founded 1853, closed in 1985.
- Stella Maris Convent, Broadstairs

St. Victoire's Convent, Hackney, London

=== North America ===
- St. Mary's High School, Calgary, Alberta, Canada
- Saint Philomena School, Portsmouth, Rhode Island, USA

== Notable sisters ==
- Sister M Clare O'Connor
