= Bellerive FCJ Catholic College =

Secondary school in Liverpool

Bellerive FCJ Catholic College liverpool

Location
- Aigburth Drive; Liverpool, Merseyside, L17 3AA; England
- Coordinates: 53.386967°N 2.949564°W

Information
- Type: Academy
- Motto: Suaviter in modo fortiter in re (Latin); Gentle in manner resolute in execution
- Religious affiliation: Roman Catholic
- Established: 1844; 182 years ago
- Founder: Faithful Companions of Jesus
- Department for Education URN: 138183 Tables
- Ofsted: Reports
- Chair of Governors: Brenda Wallace
- Head teacher: Ella Brett
- Gender: Girls; Coeducational (Sixth Form)
- Age: 11 to 18
- Enrolment: 904
- Diocese: Liverpool
- Former name: Bellerive Girls' School
- Website: www.bellerivefcj.org

Bellerive FCJ Catholic College is an all-girls secondary school and a coeducational sixth form located on Windermere Terrace in Liverpool. It is a Roman Catholic school, and has academy status.

== Admissions ==
It is a Catholic girls' school. It is situated at the junction of the two sections of the A5089, on the Trans Pennine Trail. It is a single-sex school, with girls attending between the ages of 11–18 and boys in the Sixth Form.

== History ==
The school opened in 1844 as a boarding school on Great George's Square, offering instruction in Geography, use of globes, Botany, History, Writing, Arithmetic, French and Italian languages. After 52 years the school was moved to Princes Park in 1887. The values of the Faithful Companions of Jesus (FCJ) charism are central to all that takes place in the school. These values include, Companionship, Dignity, Excellence, Justice, Gentleness and Hope.

=== Direct grant grammar school ===
Like several single-sex catholic secondary schools in Liverpool it was a direct grant grammar school, the Bellerive Girls' School, commonly known as Bellerive Convent Grammar School, from 1946. It is now a single institution spanning both sides of Ullet Road, connected by a private subway and it is called Bellerive FCJ Catholic College. Another catholic girls' direct grant grammar school in Liverpool was the Notre Dame Collegiate School, now the Notre Dame Catholic College.

The school had boarding facilities until 1961. In the 1970s the headteacher was Sister Mary Gabriel.

=== Comprehensive ===
It became a comprehensive in 1983, becoming the upper school of St Mary's RC High School. The lower school was at the former St Margaret Clitherow school.

In 1997 it became known as Bellerive Convent FCJ, later Bellerive Catholic High School FCJ. Today it is known as Bellerive FCJ Catholic College. It gained Science College status in 2003, and Maths and Computing College status in 2007.

Sister Brigid Halligan received the OBE in the 2008 New Year Honours. Sr Brigid retired as Headteacher in August 2017 and has been replaced by Mrs N Howlett MSc NPQH.

In 2016, Bellerive was confirmed as a good school following an Ofsted inspection. An Archdiocese of Liverpool Section 48 inspection in June 2017 concluded that Bellerive was an outstanding provider of Catholic education A number of new buildings were opened in 2016-17, including the Sefton Park building( housing the sixth form, Music, Performing Arts and Humanities. The main performance space has been named the Loyola Hall in honour of St. Ignatius of Loyola, founder of the Society of Jesus ( Jesuits). The FCJ sisters share a common Ignatian spirituality with other religious communities.

The O'Neill building ( housing Design Technology, Art and Science) was opened by Bishop Tom Williams in April 2018. The O'Neill building has been named in honour of Mother Xavier O'Neill fcJ who died in the 1840s working with the poor of Liverpool in St.Patrick's parish.

Construction of a new sports hall commenced in 2017, on the site of the schools tennis courts. Work on this building is scheduled to be completed by August 2018. In September 2017, Bellerive became the base for the Resonate Music Service's south Liverpool hub.

=== Academy ===
The school became an academy in August 2012, and is no longer under local authority control. However the school continues to coordinate admissions with the Liverpool local authority.

== Academic performance ==
In 2010 it received above average GCSE results, much improved from the year before. At A level, in 2011, the school results were broadly inline with national averages post 16 and are improving. In 2017, Bellerive's Progress 8 score was 0.29 ( provisional), putting it in the top 10 of Liverpool schools on this measure of academic progress in 8 GCSE subjects.

== Notable former pupils ==
=== Bellerive FCJ College ===
- Florence Milnes (1893–1966) - established and ran first BBC library
- Nikita Parris (b. 1994) - footballer

=== Bellerive Girls' School ===
- Rosie Cooper (b. 1950) - Labour MP since 2005 for West Lancashire (attended 1962–1969)
- Nicola Hodson, chief executive since January 2023, of IBM UK
- Rosemary Thomas (née O'Brien) OBE - Ambassador to Belarus (in Minsk) since 2009 (attended 1975–1982)

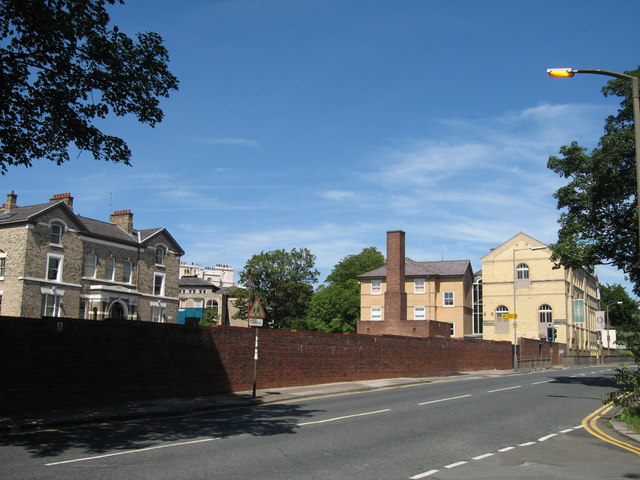
School buildings

== See also ==
- List of direct grant grammar schools
- Upton Hall School FCJ, a girls' grammar school in Wirral (former Cheshire), and also a former direct grant grammar school
