= Genazzano FCJ College =

Location
- Kew, Victoria; Australia; 37°48′30″S 145°3′21″E

Information
- Type: Independent, day and boarding
- Motto: Latin: Fidelis (Faithful)
- Denomination: Catholic (FCJ Sisters)
- Established: 1889
- Principal: Loretta Wholley
- Years offered: ELC–12
- Gender: Girls
- Enrolment: ~1000 (P–12)
- Colours: Cardinal, silver and blue
- Slogan: Fidelity Courage and Confidence
- Affiliation: Girls Sport Victoria
- Website: genazzano.vic.edu.au

Victorian Heritage Register
- Official name: Genazzano FCJ College
- Type: Registered Place
- Designated: 9 November 2000
- Reference no.: VHR H1902
- Heritage overlay no.: HO252
- Categories: Education; Religion

Genazzano FCJ College is a Catholic, day and boarding school for girls, located in Kew, an eastern suburb of Melbourne, Victoria, Australia.

Established in 1889 by the Faithful Companions of Jesus (FCJ Sisters), the college has a non-selective enrolment policy. In 2007, the school catered for approximately 1,000 students from Early Learning Centre to Year 12, including 40 boarders from Years 8 to 12.

Genazzano is a member of the Association of Heads of Independent Schools of Australia (AHISA), the Association of Independent Schools of Victoria (AISV), the Alliance of Girls' Schools Australasia. and a founding member of Girls Sport Victoria (GSV).

== History ==
Genazzano FCJ College was founded in 1889 as a boarding school for country girls by the order, Faithful Companions of Jesus (FCJ Sisters), specifically Marie Madeleine D'Houet, in honour of whom one of the schools houses is named, on its current site at Kew. The name is derived from the town Genazzano in Italy.

The Wardell Building at the College was added to the Victorian Heritage Register on 9 November 2000 in recognition of its architectural and historical significance.

== Curriculum ==
Genazzano FCJ College offers a range of Victorian Certificate of Education (VCE) subjects.

VCE results 2016-2025
| Year | Rank | Median study score | Scores of 40+ (%) | Cohort size |
|---|---|---|---|---|
| 2016 | 34 | 35 | 22.6 | 259 |
| 2017 | 34 | 35 | 22 | 286 |
| 2018 | 33 | 35 | 20.5 | 255 |
| 2019 | 29 | 35 | 23.3 | 266 |
| 2020 | 46 | 34 | 19 | 273 |
| 2021 | 41 | 34 | 18.2 | 219 |
| 2022 | 56 | 33 | 18.1 | 206 |
| 2023 | 43 | 34 | 18 | 200 |
| 2024 | 42 | 34 | 19.6 | 190 |
| 2025 | 35 | 35 | 20.4 | 197 |

== Facilities ==
The current facilities of Genazzano FCJ College include: The original Wardell Building housing all Year 10 to 12 classrooms, specialist areas, the Chapel and the Madeleine Performing Arts Centre; The Physical Education Complex incorporating the Centenary Hall, which houses a 25-metre swimming pool and gymnasium; The D'Houet Building housing library and technology facilities, science laboratories and preparation areas, a Careers Centre, and a centre for VCE education with classrooms, tutorial rooms and conference facilities. This building incorporates the former library building which has been refurbished to include Food Technology facilities, cafeteria amenities and Year 5-7 classrooms; 'Grange Hill' is the location for Prep to Year 4 education housing a library complex, specialist areas and administrative facilities. The Early Learning Centre is also housed at Grange Hill and provides early childhood education for 3 and 4 year old girls and boys.

== Sport ==
Genazzano is a member of Girls Sport Victoria (GSV).

=== GSV premierships ===
Genazzano has won the following GSV premierships.

- Basketball – 2002, 2003
- Cricket – 2002, 2003
- Cross Country – 2010
- Netball – 2001, 2007, 2008, 2011, 2015
- Tennis – 2002, 2003, 2011, 2012
- Triathlon, Sprint – 2020

== Programs ==
Genazzano offers a rowing program for girls in years 8–12, competing in regattas across Victoria and at Head of the School Girls. At the 2010 Head of the School Girls Regatta, Genazzano took out 13 titles.

Senior students in Years 10 to 12 annually produce a musical with their counterparts at Xavier College.

Genazzano is an active member of GSV offering a variety of sports across the year and each term.

Participates in the Debating Association of Victoria's (DAV) Debating Competition.

Music lessons are offered as well as multiple opportunities to participate in bands, ensembles and orchestras.

== Notable alumnae ==
- Jane Kennedy – Actress, comedian and producer with Working Dog Productions
- Robyn Nevin AM – Actress; Artistic Director/CEO of the Sydney Theatre Company (also attended The Fahan School)
- Brenda Niall AO – Biographer, literary critic and journalist
- Belle Bruce Reid – first female veterinarian to qualify in Australia
- Julia Zaetta – Editor of Better Homes and Gardens, Pacific Magazines Pty Limited; Former Editorial Director of The Australian Women's Weekly
- Felicity Pia Hampel SC – Judge of the County Court of Victoria
- Cate Molloy – Member of the Legislative Assembly (Independent) for Noosa 2006; MLA (ALP) for Noosa 2001–06
- Sarah Banting – Coxswain of Australian Women's 8+ At 2016 RIO Olympics
- Mary Parker – actress
- Bernadette Tobin AO – ethicist
- Lisa Gervasoni – artist

== See also ==
- List of schools in Victoria
- List of high schools in Victoria
- Victorian Certificate of Education
- List of boarding schools in Victoria
