= Marie-Madeleine d'Houët =

Marie-Madeleine d'Houët (1781–1858) also known as Viscountess de Bonnault d'Houët, was a French widow and single mother who, later in her life, was inspired by zeal for God and guided by Ignatian spirituality to found a religious institute of Religious Sisters known as the Faithful Companions of Jesus. Their goal is to work to help the poor and needy of society, and their communities have expanded around world, running schools and social service operations.

== Life ==
=== Early life ===
She was born Marie-Madeleine-Victoire de Bengy in Châteauroux, then in the ancient Province of Berry in the Kingdom of France (now in the Department of Indre), the second of five children of Chevalier Sylvain Charles Pierre de Bengy, commander of a corps of French Marines, and Marie de Cougny de la Presle. She was affectionately called "Gigi" by her family. The Bengy family was a large and prosperous one, prominent in the history of the region. Her parents, to whom she was close, were devout Catholics, and when the French Revolution broke out her father was imprisoned by the local Revolutionary Tribunal. While she worked to free her father, his wife took the children to a secluded farmhouse, where they followed a domestic routine. Madeleine was struck by the quiet determination and faith her mother displayed during this period.

Her father was freed from imprisonment in 1800, and after his reunion with the family, they moved to Issoudun. There Bengy met another young girl her own age who was to become a lifelong friend, Constance. They became inseparable, sharing their innermost thoughts with one another. They would also go together to provide help to the poor and sick of the city.

As part of their service, the pair would volunteer to help at the local Hospice of St. Roch. They were outraged to learn that the workers were stealing the food intended for the patients. Bengy showed a sense of determination for seeking justice which she would often display later in life. She pursued the matter with municipal officials until the thefts were addressed.

=== A brief marriage ===
Bengy's father soon chose a husband for his daughter, Viscount Joseph de Bonnault d'Houët, a match which Madeleine found to be a happy one, as she found a kindred spirit in him, and the young couple quickly developed strong feelings for one another. They were wed on 21 August 1804 at the imposing Cathedral of Bourges, where they settled into their new home.

The couple soon developed a happy home life, sharing a love of literature and also a devotion to prayer. When Madeleine started to resume her practice of visiting the needy in her new city, Joseph accompanied her. When she showed signs of being pregnant early the following year, on his own, d'Houët would visit Spanish soldiers held as prisoners of war being held in the city. As a result of these visits, however, he contracted typhoid fever, lingering for six months before dying in June 1805, less than a year after their wedding.

=== Widow and mother ===
After her husband's funeral, Madeleine withdrew to a house which had been her dowry. As the birth of her child approached, she went to the home of her in-law's for the delivery. She gave birth to a son, whom she named Eugène, on 23 September 1805. After this, she sank into a deep postpartum depression, which lasted for months. During that period she constantly feared the child's death as well as her own. She insisted that he never be left alone, and, after leaving the house, needed to be given a signal that all was well as she approached it on her return.

With time the widow d'Houët was drawn out of this state of mind by the demands of her estate and the care of her son. The d'Houët family, however, remained concerned about her ability to fulfill these duties. In time she received a marriage proposal which seemed to be a good match and way to deal with her husband's family. Trying to decide what step to take, she consulted a priest. His advice was simply to pray on the matter. As she did, Madeleine was surprised to find that she was being called live in greater trust of God, to which she finally consented.

Gradually d'Houët's life became more spiritually focused. She stopped attending the theater, a previous favorite pastime of hers, and began to attend daily Mass. She would throw herself into the care of the tenant farmers on her property whenever she stayed at her country house. Back in Bourges, she resumed her rounds of charity. In 1809 she began to accompany a group of Daughters of Charity of St. Vincent de Paul in visiting the same Spanish prisoners whom her late husband had cared for. Like him, she, along with one of the Daughters, contracted typhoid fever. Unlike him and the Daughter of Charity, she survived the contagion.

=== The Jesuit spirit ===
In 1814 the Bishop of Amiens invited the Society of Jesus to open a school at the former Abbey of Saint-Acheul in his city. Upon hearing this, d'Houët determined to send her son there, despite its distance from their home. Doting mother that she was, she arranged to stay in the city for a time, as she helped her son adjust to his new environment. This was her first personal encounter with the Jesuit Fathers, and she found herself drawn to taking part in the activities of the school, volunteering her help. She was drawn to concern for others among the boys at the school.

Later, in 1815, Madame d'Houët had the opportunity to delve more deeply in the spirit of Ignatius de Loyola, the founder of the Jesuits. That year she provided refuge to a Jesuit priest, a former Royalist soldier, who was being hunted by authorities after the return of Napoleon to power. He lived secretly in her house for five months. When soldiers came to her house looking for him, however, she was saved only through the fact that the colonel in charge of the group was a schoolmate and friend of her brother.

== Foundress ==
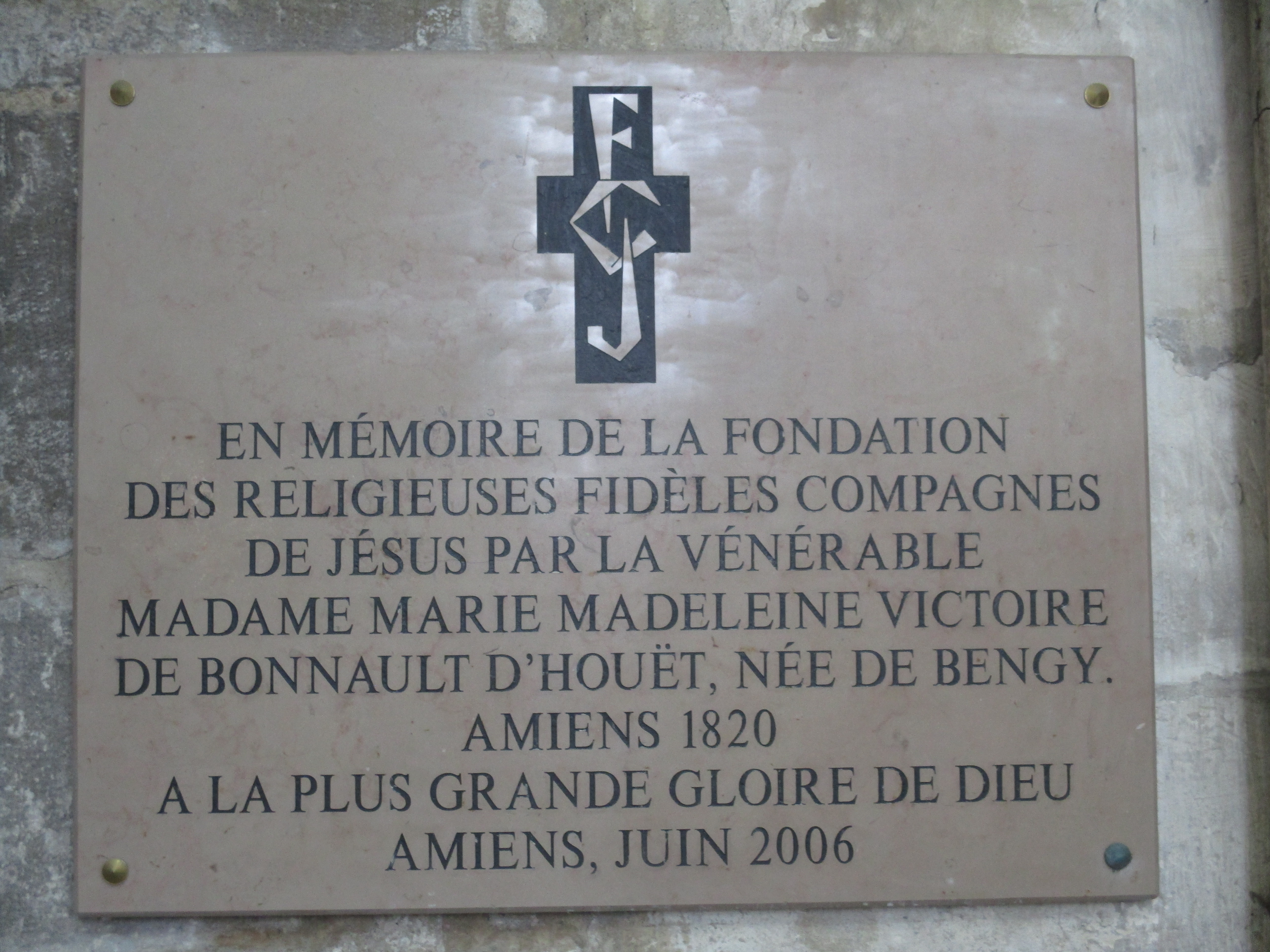
Memorial in Amiens Cathedral.

Inspired by zeal for God, Marie-Madeleine founded a religious institute of Religious Sisters known as the Faithful Companions of Jesus, beginning with a convent school in Amiens, France. The congregation received a Decree of Approbation from Pope Gregory XVI in 1837.

=== Expansion ===
From the institute's first foundation in Amiens, it spread quickly across the globe. Twenty seven convents of the institute were established in Mother d'Houët's lifetime with several more thereafter. Genazzano FCJ College in Kew, Notre Dame de France in Paris, Vaucluse College FCJ in Richmond, Gumley House at Isleworth, and another FCJ College in Benalla were established thanks to her work.

Madeleine d'Houët was a devoted missionary having completed more than five hundred journeys during her years of ministry. The community founded by Madeleine d'Houët is dedicated to the education of the underprivileged and marginalised, especially girls and women, in the Americas, Asia, Australia, and Europe.

Madeleine d'Houët is the foundress of Laurel Hill Coláiste, a girls school in Limerick, Ireland.

== Veneration ==
Her spiritual writings were approved by theologians on 22 April 1903, and on 13 December 1916 the cause for her beatification was formally opened, granting her the title of Servant of God.

=== Resting place ===
In 1904, upon the expulsion of the Sisters from France by an anti-clerical government, Mother d'Houët's remains were transferred to a cemetery of a convent of the congregation in England, near Birkenhead. In 1980, at the request of the Postulator of the cause, the remains were transferred to the chapel of the General Motherhouse of the congregation in Broadstairs, Kent.

On 22 September 2012, the remains were moved one final time and returned to Paris, where they were entombed in the Church of St. Dominique, Paris near the house where she had died. Some 50 Companions of Jesus from around the world were present for the ceremony, as well as seven generations of Mother d'Houët's descendants and members of the Bengy family.

== See also ==
- Ignatius of Loyola
- Jesuits
