= Upton Hall School FCJ =

Girls' grammar school in Upton, Wirral, England

Location
- Moreton Road; Upton, Merseyside, CH49 6LJ; England
- Coordinates: 53.3852°N 3.0995°W

Information
- Type: Grammar school; Academy
- Motto: Age quod agis "Whatever you do, do it well"
- Religious affiliation: Roman Catholic
- Established: 1849; 177 years ago
- Founders: Faithful Companions of Jesus
- Department for Education URN: 137929 Tables
- Ofsted: Reports
- Gender: Girls
- Age: 11 to 18
- Enrolment: 900 (incl. 220 in sixth form)
- Colours: Green, yellow
- Website: www.uptonhallschool.co.uk

Upton Hall School FCJ is a Catholic girls' grammar school with academy status located in Merseyside, England. It was founded in 1849 by the Faithful Companions of Jesus (FCJ).

== Admissions ==
It is one of four Catholic schools in the Metropolitan Borough of Wirral. The school is located within the Catholic Diocese of Shrewsbury. It was awarded 'Outstanding' by Ofsted in 2006, 2012 and again in 2022. The school holds Training School status.

== History ==
It was founded as a girls' convent school by Nuns of the Society of the Faithful Companions of Jesus (FCJ) in 1862.

The remains of Marie Madeleine, the founder of the FCJ, were reburied in the school's personal graveyard in 1904 due to anti-clerical tensions in France. Her body was moved to Kent in 1980, and subsequently to Paris in 2012.

== Alumni ==
- Florence Barry, leader of the Roman Catholic feminist organisation St. Joan’s International Alliance who was awarded the Pro Ecclesia et Pontifice medal
- Berlie Doherty, children's books author, and playwright, twice winner of the Carnegie Medal
- Charlotte O'Conor Eccles, Irish writer
- Sally Nugent, presenter on BBC Breakfast and BBC News channel
- Wendy Piatt, Director General of the Russell Group since 2007
- Niamh Charles, professional footballer
- Liz Carr, English actress, comedian, broadcaster and disability rights activist

== Former teachers ==
- Angela Topping, poet

== See also ==
- Bellerive FCJ Catholic College
- Diocese of Shrewsbury
- St Anselm's College, Birkenhead
- Upton Court Grammar School

== Sources ==
- http://www.uptonhall.wirral.sch.uk/
- https://web.archive.org/web/20070409004554/http://www.specialistschools.org.uk/
- http://www.fcjsisters.org/
