= Stalking Bill 1996 =

Proposed Act of Parliament

There was no offence which is described in law as "stalking" in the UK. An attempt to create such an offence by the Stalking Bill 1996 failed. The bill was presented to Parliament by Janet Anderson under the Ten Minute Rule, with support from 64 other MPs. The bill failed to get government support, as it was felt that the proposed offence failed to distinguish between reasonable and unreasonable conduct.

Following the failure of the Stalking Bill to be enacted, an offence of "harassment" was later created in England and Wales by the enactment of the Protection from Harassment Act 1997, which came into force on 16 June 1997. In Scots law, the 1997 act also created a civil remedy through non-harassment orders. The Protection from Harassment Act was later amended by the Protection of Freedoms Act 2012, which added to it the specific offences of "stalking" and "stalking involving fear of violence or serious alarm or distress".
