= Daniel Kawczynski =

British politician (born 1972)

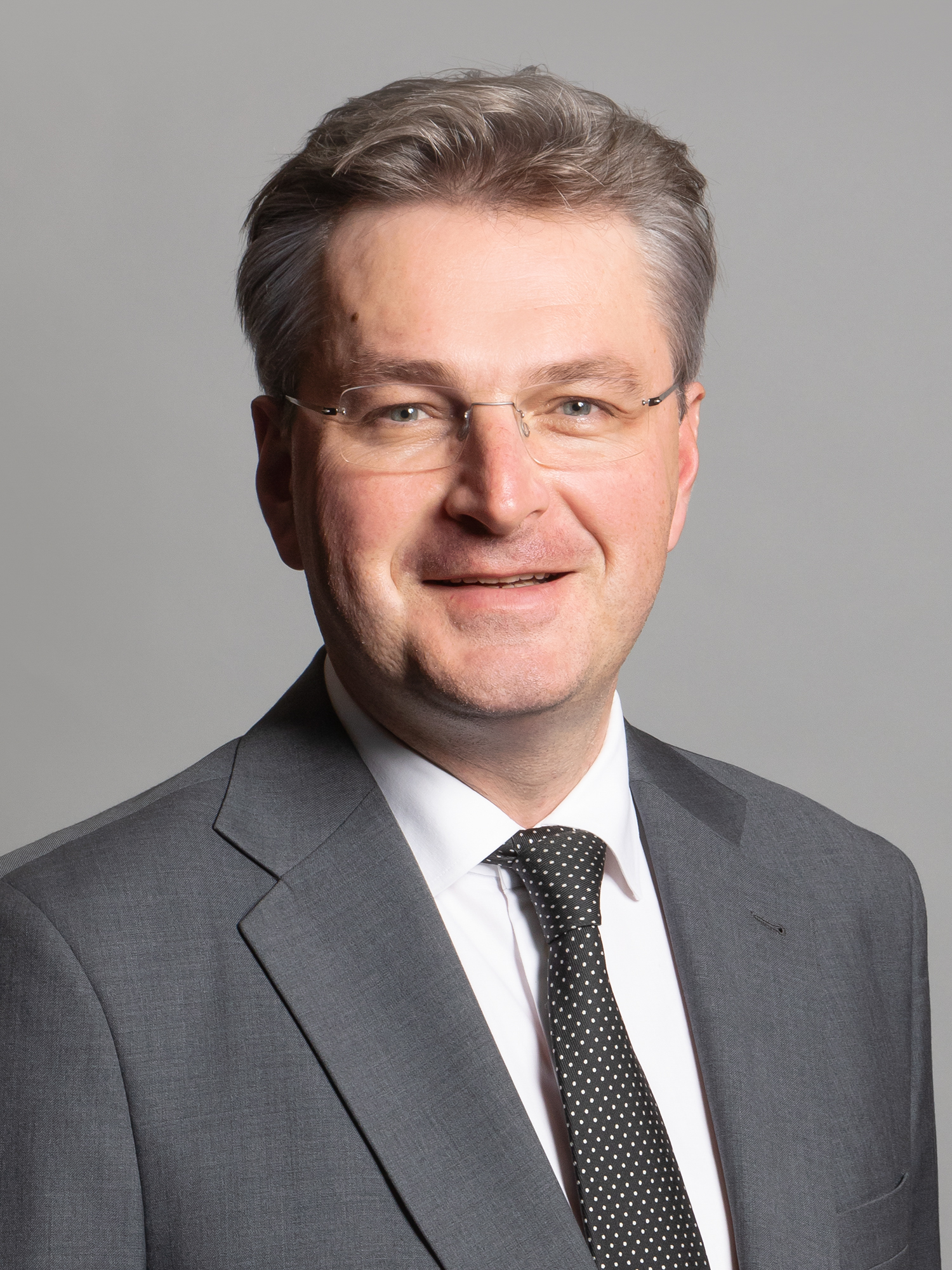
- Official portrait, 2020

Member of Parliament for Shrewsbury and Atcham
- In office 5 May 2005 – 30 May 2024
- Preceded by: Paul Marsden
- Succeeded by: Julia Buckley

Personal details
- Born: Daniel Robert Kawczynski; 24 January 1962 (age 64) Warsaw, Poland
- Party: Conservative
- Spouse: Fernando Lameu (m. 2019)
- Education: University of Stirling
- Website: www.daniel4shrewsbury.co.uk

Daniel Robert Kawczynski (Polish: Kawczyński [kaˈft͡ʂɨj̃skʲi]; born 24 January 1962) is a Polish-born British politician who was a Conservative Party MP. Kawczynski has served as Parliamentary Private Secretary at the Department for Environment, Food and Rural Affairs, a parliamentary aide to the former Welsh Secretary David Jones, as well as serving as a member of the Foreign Affairs Select Committee and as Special Advisor to Prime Minister David Cameron on Central and Eastern Europe and on Central and Eastern Europeans living in the United Kingdom. On 4 July 2024, Kawczynski lost to Labour candidate Julia Buckley in a historical electoral landslide for Labour in the constituency of Shrewsbury.

== Early life and education ==
Kawczynski was born on 24 January 1972 in Warsaw, Poland. His parents are Leonard and Halina Kawczynski, now Tipper. He moved to Britain with his mother at the age of six. He was educated at St George's College, Weybridge, an independent Roman Catholic school in Surrey, followed by Birmingham Polytechnic and then the University of Stirling where he studied Business Studies and French, graduating in 1994. He served as president of the university's Conservative Association in 1991. He worked in the business entertainment industry before he became an international account manager in the telecommunications industry, a position he held for ten years from 1994 to 2004. This role involved extensive travel in Europe, the Middle East and Africa.

== Parliamentary career ==
Kawczynski unsuccessfully stood as the Conservative Party candidate in the 2001 general election for Ealing Southall in London, coming second with 18% of the vote. He was subsequently selected as the Conservative Party candidate for the Shrewsbury and Atcham constituency. He was elected at the 2005 general election, defeating the Labour MP Paul Marsden with 37.7% of the vote.

Upon entering Parliament, Kawczynski established the Dairy All-Party Parliamentary Group to help milk farmers in his constituency. He sat as a member of both the International Development Select Committee and the Justice Select Committee, but was criticised by the Birmingham Post in 2009 for failing to regularly attend the meetings of the Select Committees to which he had been appointed. He was recorded as having attended only 12.5% of all Justice Select Committee meetings and 31.3% of International Development Select Committee meetings during the previous last Parliamentary session. He stated the figure for the international development committee was wrong and he had been unable to attend the justice committee meetings because they clashed.

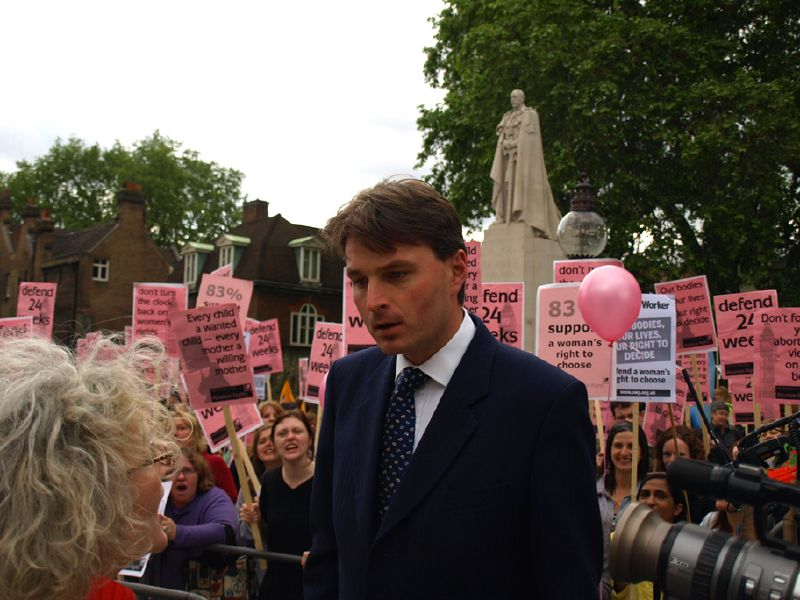
Kawczynski speaking to the media about the Human Fertilisation and Embryology Act 2008

In 2007, Kawczynski signed an Early Day Motion that welcomed the "positive contribution made to the health of the nation by the NHS homeopathic hospitals". In May 2008, he voted to lower the abortion time limit to 12 weeks, and has said that he believes an abortion limit of 24 weeks is incompatible with the kind of "Christian society" he wishes to live in. He voted against a House of Lords amendment to abolish the offences of blasphemy and blasphemous libel under common law. In October 2009, he appeared on The Doha Debates as a delegate supporting the motion of "This house deplores the release of Lockerbie bomber Abdelbaset al-Megrahi". In the wake of the Westminster Parliamentary Expenses scandal in 2009, he was ordered to repay £4000 for rent costs that he had over-claimed. In 2010, he called for the ban on fox hunting to be repealed by the Conservative government.

Kawczynski was re-elected at the 2010 general election with 43.9% of the vote. In September 2012, he was appointed Parliamentary Private Secretary to the new Secretary of State for Wales, David Jones. When Jones lost his role in 2014, Kawczynski became advisor to the Prime Minister David Cameron on Eastern and Central European Diaspora. He voted in favour of same sex marriage in 2013, stating shortly afterwards that he was in a same-sex relationship. He was chair of the All-Party Group for Saudi Arabia between 2011 and 2016, and during his time as chairman he led delegations to the country. He was chair of the All-Party Group for Libya but that group has now ceased to exist.

In October 2013, Kawczynski reportedly told a one-legged drug addict in a wheelchair who was begging outside the Houses of Parliament to 'get a job'. Kawczynski said he had offered the beggar "useful advice", stating: "He asked me for money so I asked him what he was doing to find a job. He had difficulties in literacy and numeracy. I told him there were government initiatives to help him with this." Kawczynski held his seat in the 2015 general election. In the 2016 Conservative Party leadership election, he supported Michael Gove. He was re-elected in the 2017 general election. He stated that he was against efforts to replace Theresa May but criticised her government for granting too many concessions to the EU. He opposed the preservation of a customs union.

It was reported in early November 2017 that Kawczynski had been reprimanded in front of witnesses by Eleanor Laing, the Conservative MP and deputy speaker, for asking a young researcher employed by Laing to go on a date with a rich businessman contact of his who was "older than her father". According to Channel 4 News, the incident occurred in January 2013 and was preceded by an intermediary making the same approach several times. The Daily Telegraph, reported that Kawczynski had been referred to the Conservative party's new disciplinary committee. He admitted to the incident, but rejected the accusation of inappropriate conduct.

Kawczynski expressed support for a prospective leadership bid by Jacob Rees-Mogg in 2018. From February 2018, he was paid £6,000 per month by the Electrum Group, a New York City-based investment, advisory and asset management firm owned by Thomas Kaplan. He described his association with the firm as a job he would work in his spare time. In February 2020, Kawczynski generated controversy for sharing a platform with right-wing populist politicians including Hungarian prime minister Viktor Orbán and the former deputy prime minister of Italy Matteo Salvini, at a conference organised by the Edmund Burke Foundation. Labour MP Andrew Gwynne called for Kawczynski to be suspended from Parliament, and he received additional criticism from some within the Conservative Party. Kawczynski responded in an article published in The Spectator stating that his reason for attending the conference was to make the case for nation states against European federalism.

=== Saudi Arabia ===
In 2015, Kawczynski was described as a strong supporter of the Saudi Arabian government. On a visit to Saudi Arabia, he told then defence minister Salman Al Saud that he was proud of the ongoing military cooperation between the two countries. He later said that he was writing "the most pro-Saudi book ever written by a British politician" and that he had been "battling against extraordinary ignorance and prejudice against Saudi Arabia for many years".

During an appearance on Newsnight in September 2018, Kawczynski defended the Saudi regime's approach to the war in Yemen and accused the BBC of bias against the Gulf coalition. He said that less coverage had been given to atrocities committed by the Houthis, and called it "an extremely complicated war." He threatened legal action after its editor Ian Katz suggested his opinion on the issue might be linked to the size of the budget for his expenses on trips to Saudi Arabia.

In December 2021, journalists gained access to some of Kawczynski's WhatsApp messages where he described himself as the most "pro-Saudi" MP, and that Saudi leader Mohammed bin Salman "has stated that Saudi has no better friend in UK than me". Kawczynski was seeking through an agent a well-paid second job with a Saudi or other Middle East company. He arranged to meet a potential Saudi employer in parliament, and also arranged to meet the agent in his parliamentary office. He also wrote that he was disillusioned with Westminster politics and would like in due course to become UK Ambassador to Saudi Arabia. He was subsequently reported to the parliamentary commissioner for standards.

=== Constituency ===
In 2019 the Shropshire Star reported that Kawczynski's top three priorities for his new term in office were "adult social care, modernising the county's hospitals and tackling climate change." The newspaper also quoted Kawczynski's concern that Shropshire Council was facing "intolerable financial pressures when it came to funding care for older people" and, in his view, "the Conservative Party should use its majority to find a fair solution to the problem."

=== Bullying of parliamentary staff ===
In June 2021, Kawczynski made an apology from the floor of the House of Commons for bullying two members of parliamentary staff in April 2020. The incident occurred after Kawczynski was unable to join a virtual meeting due to "technical difficulties" and afterwards he was "rude, aggressive and impatient" to staff members and made "critical and untruthful comments" about them in a WhatsApp group. The investigation found that he had "consumed a significant amount of alcohol" on the day in question. He accepted that his conduct "constituted bullying, and as such was entirely inexcusable." He was ordered to make the apology by the Independent Expert Panel chaired by Sir Stephen Irwin, following receipt of a report by the Parliamentary Standards Commissioner. The Commissioner, Kathryn Stone, determined that Kawczynski had "acted in an intimidatory and threatening manner towards the Complainants, and abused his power as a Member of Parliament by behaving in the manner and by making exaggerated and malicious claims regarding the poor performance of the Complainants". He appealed but a second panel found the sanction was "proper and proportionate".

In November 2021, The Times reported that Stone was again investigating Kawczynski after he admitted that he only apologised to the House of Commons to avoid being suspended. In January 2022, Kawczynski was suspended from the House of Commons for one day for his bullying in April 2020 and the manner of apology in June 2021. This was shortened due to mental health difficulties he faced at the time of the incident.

=== Anglo-Polish relations ===
Since becoming the chair of the All-Party Parliamentary Group on Poland in 2014, Kawczynski has supported a range of enterprises from his constituency in seeking business partners and export markets in Poland and other Central and Eastern European countries, offering support and advice. He had been a frequent visitor to the British Polish Chamber of Commerce in Warsaw where he often spoke of the importance of trade between Poland and the United Kingdom. In 2016, Kawczynski was distinguished as an "Outstanding Pole Abroad of 2016" for his efforts in promoting trade and political relations between the United Kingdom and his country of birth.

In 2017, Kawczynski joined calls for Germany to pay war reparations for crimes committed against the Allies and for the destruction of Poland during the Second World War. On 15 October 2017, he sent a letter to German Chancellor Angela Merkel urging her to stop demanding money from the UK during the Brexit negotiations and pay Poland. In 2019, he said that he had asked the Polish Government to veto any requests for an extension of the Article 50 period that might be made by the UK Government. In late 2021, a Freedom of Information request from the media showed that Kawczynski had claimed nearly £22,000 in expenses between 2016 and 2021 for Polish language lessons, despite Polish being his native tongue and his claiming to be a fluent speaker. Kawczynski said that while he was able to converse in Polish, his reading and writing skills had been limited.

=== European Union ===
Kawczynski is a supporter of Brexit and a former member of the European Research Group, which he left in April 2019. In September 2018 he claimed on Twitter that EU lemon growers are inefficient, and that the EU imposed tariffs on the import of fruit from non-EU Mediterranean countries, causing higher prices to consumers. Both claims were refuted. On 2 February 2019, Kawczynski tweeted, in the context of a complaint about certain attitudes of the European Union, that "Britain helped to liberate half of Europe. She mortgaged herself up to eye balls in process. No Marshall Plan for us only for Germany. We gave up war reparations in 1990. We put £370 billion into EU since we joined. Watch the way ungrateful EU treats us now. We will remember." It was pointed out that Britain received 26% of Marshall Plan aid, more than any other country. He apologised for the inaccuracy. He later clarified his point by saying that Britain had stood alone for much of the war, and in his view, "the massive loans that Britain had to take out during the war from America outweighed the benefits of the aid received."

=== Morocco ===
In May 2024, following a trip to Morocco sponsored by the Moroccan embassy in London, Kawczynski introduced a debate in the House of Commons on the question of recognizing Western Sahara as Moroccan, advocating such recognition.

== Post-parliamentary career ==
Following his defeat at the 2024 UK General Election, Kawczynski was appointed Chairman of the Libya United Kingdom Alliance (LUKA).

== Personal life ==
In 2000, Kawczynski married; he divorced in 2011. In June 2013, he announced to his Conservative Association that his new partner was a Brazilian male. He was the second MP in Britain to come out as bisexual, the first being Liberal Democrat Simon Hughes. He married his Brazilian partner of eight years, Fernando Lameu, on 9 November 2019, in a civil partnership ceremony in the House of Commons. Kawczynski is a practising Catholic and as a young man had prayed to become heterosexual.

When he was first elected, in 2005, Kawczynski became Britain's tallest ever MP, at 6 ft 9 in (2.06 m).

In 2010, his book, Seeking Gaddafi: Libya, the West and the Arab Spring, about Muammar Gaddafi of Libya, was published by Dialogue, with a paperback edition published in 2011 by Biteback Publishing.

Parliament of the United Kingdom
Preceded by Paul Marsden	Member of Parliament for Shrewsbury and Atcham; 2005–2024	Succeeded by Julia Buckley
