= Janet Anderson =

British politician (1949–2023)

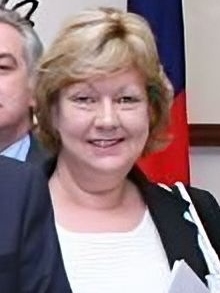
- Anderson in 2007

Parliamentary Under-Secretary of State for Film, Tourism and Broadcasting
- In office 27 July 1998 – 7 June 2001
- Prime Minister: Tony Blair
- Preceded by: Tom Clarke
- Succeeded by: Richard Caborn

Vice-Chamberlain of the Household
- In office 2 May 1997 – 27 July 1998
- Prime Minister: Tony Blair
- Preceded by: Derek Conway
- Succeeded by: Graham Allen

Shadow Minister for Women
- In office 26 July 1996 – 2 May 1997
- Leader: Tony Blair
- Preceded by: Tessa Jowell
- Succeeded by: Gillian Shephard

Member of Parliament for Rossendale and Darwen
- In office 9 April 1992 – 12 April 2010
- Preceded by: Sir David Trippier
- Succeeded by: Jake Berry

Personal details
- Born: 6 December 1949 Newcastle upon Tyne, England
- Died: 6 February 2023 (aged 73)
- Party: Labour
- Spouses: Vincent Humphries (m. 1972; sep. 1998); Jim Dowd (m. 2016)
- Children: 3
- Education: Polytechnic of Central London; University of Nantes

Janet Anderson (6 December 1949 – 6 February 2023) was a British politician from the Labour Party. She was Member of Parliament (MP) for Rossendale and Darwen from 1992 until 2010, when she lost her seat. She was the Minister for Tourism from 1998 to 2001, a period which included the 2001 United Kingdom foot-and-mouth outbreak. In the 2009 United Kingdom parliamentary expenses scandal, she was found to have claimed costs for journeys she had not made.

== Early life and education ==
Anderson was born in Newcastle upon Tyne in 1949. Her father, Tom Anderson, was an agent for the Labour Party; her mother was an organist in their local Methodist church. She was educated at Trowbridge Girls' High School (now The John of Gaunt School) and the Kingswood Grammar School in Kingswood, South Gloucestershire. She attended the Polytechnic of Central London and the Université de Nantes, and studied languages and business studies.

== Career ==
In 1971, Anderson joined the offices of The Scotsman and The Sunday Times as a secretary. In 1974, she became the personal assistant to the MP for Blackburn, Barbara Castle, and to her successor Jack Straw until the 1987 General Election, when she unsuccessfully fought the marginal seat of Rossendale and Darwen, losing to David Trippier by 4,982 votes.

Anderson became a campaigns organiser for the Parliamentary Labour Party, and then the northern regional organiser for the Shopping Hours Reform Council, campaigning to extend the Sunday trading laws. She also ran her own public relations company, with clients such as the Royal College of Nursing and Safeway plc.

=== Parliamentary career ===
Anderson fought Rossendale and Darwen successfully at the 1992 General Election, winning by just 120 votes. She became the Parliamentary Private Secretary to the Deputy Leader of the Opposition, Margaret Beckett, which she held for a year before resigning due to Beckett not supporting John Smith's 'One member, one vote' campaign.

She was an opposition whip from 1994 to 1996, before being appointed Shadow Minister for Women. In October 1996, while in this role, she joked in an interview that women would become "more promiscuous" under a Labour Government. Anderson later insisted that she did not mean it literally, and that her comment was intended to convey that women would have the "freedom to stay at home or have a career...it wasn't about sex or promiscuity."

In May 1996, in response to campaigns to deal with the problem of stalking, she presented the Stalking Bill 1996 to Parliament under the Ten Minute Rule, with support from 64 other MPs. The bill failed to get government support, as it was felt that the proposed offence failed to distinguish between reasonable and unreasonable conduct.

Following the 1997 General Election, Anderson became a junior whip, and Vice-Chamberlain of the Household in Tony Blair's new government, before being promoted to Parliamentary Under Secretary of State at the Department for Culture, Media and Sport in 1998, where she was the Minister for Tourism, Film and Broadcasting, and was responsible for bringing in free television licences for the over 75s and discounted ones for the blind.

During her time as Minister for Tourism, rural tourism lost £100m a week at the height of the 2001 foot and mouth outbreak. Prior to the release of the 1999 James Bond film The World Is Not Enough, when MI6 tried to block filming around the exterior of their Headquarters, Anderson successfully appealed to the Foreign Secretary, who overruled them and allowed filming to commence.

At the conclusion of the foot and mouth crisis, Anderson returned to the back benches following the 2001 General Election. She subsequently served on the Home Affairs Select Committee, before becoming a member of the Culture, Media and Sport Select Committee and the House of Commons Administration Committee. She was also on the Chairmen's Panel Committee, and was a member, and later the chair, of the All-Party Parliamentary Writers' Group.

She was defeated in the 2010 General Election, by Conservative candidate Jake Berry in an 8.9% swing to the Conservatives. Berry overturned a Labour majority of 3,616 to win by 4,493 votes.

=== Book ===
While serving as junior whip and Chamberlain of the Household under Tony Blair, Anderson was responsible for sending daily reports to the Palace about daily business in Parliament. She decided to "spice up" her accounts of each day's debates by injecting them with Westminster gossip. Anderson later published her letters, which were reportedly well appreciated by the Queen, in a book titled Dear Queen.

=== Expenses ===
In May 2009, during the disclosure of expenses of British members of parliament over MPs' expenses, The Daily Telegraph alleged that Anderson had submitted and was paid a claim form including mileage equalling five round trips to her constituency each week parliament despite living in London during the week. Her expenses for car journeys were £16,612 for 60,118 miles travelled. This was £4,500 more than the next highest claimant, Laurence Robertson.

The Telegraph described her as "one of the most prolific expense claimers in Parliament".

Other allegations included expenses for the upkeep of the home of her partner, fellow MP Jim Dowd MP, in his Lewisham constituency under her second home allowance despite Dowd claiming the London salary supplement intended to cover the additional cost of living in London. Anderson was one of 98 MPs who voted in favour of legislation which would have kept MPs expense information undisclosed.

Anderson claimed near the maximum Additional Costs Allowance between 2001 and 2008, ranking joint highest in 2002/03, 2004/05 and 2006/07 also 3rd in 2003/04. In January 2010, Anderson was allowed to repay £5,750 in expenses for over-claimed petty cash.

== Personal life and death ==
Anderson married solicitor Vincent Humphreys in 1972; the couple had three children, two daughters and a son. In 1998, she left, later divorcing Humphreys for her fellow Labour MP Jim Dowd, though she remained on good terms with her former husband. She married Dowd in 2016. She spoke fluent French.

Anderson died on 6 February 2023, at the age of 73.

== Books ==
- Anderson, Janet (7 April 2016). Dear Queen. Red Axe Books. ISBN 978-0993218385.

Parliament of the United Kingdom
Preceded by Sir David Trippier	Member of Parliament for Rossendale and Darwen; 1992–2010	Succeeded by Jake Berry
Political offices
Preceded by Derek Conway	Vice-Chamberlain of the Household; 1997–1998	Succeeded by Graham Allen
