= Protection from Harassment Act 1997 =

Act of the Parliament of the United Kingdom

Protection from Harassment Act 1997 (Note: Section 16.)
- Act of Parliament
- Parliament of the United Kingdom
- Long title: An Act to make provision for protecting persons from harassment and similar conduct.
- Citation: 1997 c. 40
- Territorial extent: England and Wales (except sections 8–1); Scotland (1–7); Northern Ireland (section 13); (Note: Section 14.)

Dates
- Royal assent: 21 March 1997
- Commencement: Except for sections 1 to 12, the act came into force on 21 March 1997. Sections 1 to 3(2) and 4 to 12 came into force on 16 June 1997. Sections 3(3) to (9) came into force on 1 September 1998. (Note: Section 15.)
Other legislation
Amends	Criminal Procedure (Scotland) Act 1995
Amended by	Criminal Justice and Police Act 2001; Police Reform Act 2002; Domestic Violence, Crime and Victims Act 2004; Serious Organised Crime and Police Act 2005; Protection of Freedoms Act 2012; Policing and Crime Act 2017; Sentencing (Pre-consolidation Amendments) Act 2020; Sentencing Act 2020
Relates to	Stalking Protection Act 2019

Status: Amended

Text of statute as originally enacted

Revised text of statute as amended

The Protection from Harassment Act 1997 (c. 40) is an act of the Parliament of the United Kingdom. On introducing the bill's second reading in the House of Lords, the Lord Chancellor, Lord Mackay of Clashfern, said, "The aim of this Bill is to protect the victims of harassment. It will protect all such victims whatever the source of the harassment—so-called stalking behaviour, racial harassment, or anti-social behaviour by neighbours." Home Office guidance on the act says "The legislation was always intended to tackle stalking, but the offences were drafted to tackle any form of persistent conduct which causes another person alarm or distress."

Infield and Platford described the Act as "controversial".

== Provisions ==
=== Section 1 ===
This section prohibits a person from pursuing "a course of conduct" which "amounts to harassment of another" and which "he knows or ought to know amounts to harassment of the other". A person is taken to know that conduct is harassment if "a reasonable person in possession of the same information would think the course of conduct amounted to harassment of the other".

==== Subsection 1(1A) ====
Subsection 1(1A) was inserted by section 125(2)(a) of the Serious Organised Crime and Police Act 2005. It prohibits a person from pursuing a course of conduct "which involves harassment of two or more persons" with the intention of persuading any person (not necessarily one of the persons harassed) to do or refrain from doing something they are lawfully entitled to do or not do.

=== Section 2 ===
This section creates the offence of harassment, which is to pursue "a course of conduct" in breach of section 1 of the act. It is a summary offence. A person guilty of this offence is liable on conviction to imprisonment for a term not exceeding six months, or a to fine not exceeding level 5 on the standard scale, or to both.

Section 2(3) was repealed by section 107 of, and Schedule 8 to, the Police Reform Act 2002.

=== Section 2A ===
The Protection from Harassment Act 1997 did not originally define "stalking" or formally proscribe it. Section 111(1) of the Protection of Freedoms Act 2012 inserted the offence of stalking in relation to this section and is defined to include things like following a person, contacting a person, publishing information relating or purporting to relate to a person or purporting to originate from a person, monitoring digital communications such as email or internet activities, loitering in a public or private place, interfering with someone's property and spying on or watching a person.

The insertion of this offence followed a commitment given by the Prime Minister, David Cameron, on 8 March 2012 (International Women's Day) to remedy perceived deficiencies in the act.

The offence created by this section is a summary offence and a person guilty of it is liable on conviction to imprisonment for a term not exceeding 51 weeks, or to a fine not exceeding level 5 on the standard scale, or to both.

=== Section 2B ===
This section, which confers, on justices of the peace, a power to issue a search warrant to allow constables to enter and search premises for evidence of offences under section 2A, was inserted by section 112 of the Protection of Freedoms Act 2012.

=== Section 3 ===
This section provides for a claim in civil proceedings (creating a statutory tort) by anyone who is or who may be a victim of conduct falling within section 1. It provides for damages for anxiety caused by the harassment and any financial loss it causes, as well as providing for an injunction to restrain the defendant from conduct amounting to harassment. Where any person against whom an injunction has been granted under this section does "without reasonable excuse" anything prohibited by that injunction, section 3(6) of the act makes that person guilty of an offence.

Offences under section 3(6) are triable either way. A person guilty of an offence under section 3(6) is liable, on conviction on indictment, to imprisonment for a term not exceeding five years, or to a fine, or to both, or, on summary conviction, to imprisonment for a term not exceeding six months, or to a fine not exceeding the statutory maximum, or to both.

=== Section 3A ===
This section provides similar injunction provisions to those in section 3, but in this case applying to the offence created by section 1(1A). However, in addition to it allowing the person who is the victim or who may be the victim of the conduct in question to seek an injunction, it also gives a similar right to someone whose behaviour the harassment is intended to influence. Section 3A was inserted by section 125(5) of the Serious Organised Crime and Police Act 2005.

=== Section 4 ===
This section creates the offence of "putting people in fear of violence" where a person "causes another to fear, on at least two occasions, that violence will be used against him" provided "he knows or ought to know that his course of conduct will cause the other so to fear on each of those occasions".

There are a number of defences. These include showing that the course of conduct is pursued for the "purpose of preventing or detecting crime" or "reasonable for the protection of himself or another or for the protection of his or another’s property."

In 2001, David Ormerod said that this section "could have been drafted more clearly all round".

Offences under section 4 are triable either way. A person guilty of an offence under section 4 is liable, on conviction on indictment, to imprisonment for a term not exceeding five years, or to a fine, or to both, or, on summary conviction, to imprisonment for a term not exceeding six months, or to a fine not exceeding the statutory maximum, or to both.

=== Section 4A ===
This section creates the offence of stalking involving fear of violence or serious alarm or distress. This requires there to be a person A whose "course of conduct amounts to stalking" and a person B who is affected by the course of conduct. The course of conduct must either cause B "to fear, on at least two occasions, that violence will be used against B" or causes B "serious alarm or distress which has a substantial adverse effect on B's usual day-to-day activities".

Offences under section 4A are triable either way. A person guilty of an offence under section 4A is liable, on conviction on indictment, to imprisonment for a term not exceeding five years, or to a fine, or to both, or, on summary conviction, to imprisonment for a term not exceeding twelve months, or to a fine not exceeding the statutory maximum, or to both.

This section was inserted by section 111(2) of the Protection of Freedoms Act 2012.

=== Section 4B ===
This part specifies that if a person behaves in a way that would be an offence in terms of 4 and 4A in England and Wales, from outside of the UK and they are a UK national or habitually resident in England and Wales, the person is guilty in England and Wales of the offence.

=== Section 5 ===
This section originally gave a court dealing with a person convicted of an offence under sections 2 (harassment) or 4 (putting in fear of violence) of the act the power to make a restraining order for the purpose of protecting "the victim of the offence" or "any other person mentioned in the order". Offences were triable either way. A person found guilty of an offence under section 5 was liable, on conviction on indictment, to imprisonment for a term not exceeding five years, or to a fine, or to both, or, on summary conviction, to imprisonment for a term not exceeding six months, or to a fine not exceeding the statutory maximum, or to both. This part was repealed, by the Sentencing Act 2020.

=== Section 5A ===
This section provides for a court to impose a restraining order on someone who has been acquitted of an offence, if the court considers it necessary "to protect a person from harassment by the defendant". This section was inserted by section 12(5) of the Domestic Violence, Crime and Victims Act 2004.

=== Section 7 ===
This is the interpretation section. "Harassing" is defined (non-exclusively) as including "alarming" or "causing distress".

Section 7(3) was substituted by section 125(7)(a) of the Serious Organised Crime and Police Act 2005. It now provides that a "course of conduct" requires either conduct on at least two occasions in relation to one person, or, where the harassment is alleged against two or more people, conduct on at least one occasion in regards to each person. Section 7(3A) was inserted by section 44(1) of the Criminal Justice and Police Act 2001. Section 7(5) was inserted by section 125(7)(b) of the Serious Organised Crime and Police Act 2005.

=== Section 8 ===
Section 8 creates a civil action for harassment applying in Scotland only (sections 1-7 apply only in England and Wales).

=== Section 8A ===
This section was inserted by section 1(2) of the Domestic Abuse (Scotland) Act 2011 (asp 13).

== Racially or religiously aggravated harassment ==
Section 32 of the Crime and Disorder Act 1998 now provides that where a person commits an offence under section 2 or 4 of the Protection from Harassment Act which is "racially or religiously aggravated" within the meaning of section 28 of the Crime and Disorder Act 1998 (as amended by the Anti-terrorism, Crime and Security Act 2001) he is guilty of an offence triable either way.

A person convicted on indictment of an offence falling within section 32(1)(a) of the 1998 act (the racially or religiously aggravated version of the offence under section 2 of the Protection from Harassment Act 1997) is liable to imprisonment for a term not exceeding two years or to a fine, or to both. A person convicted on indictment of an offence falling within section 32(1)(b) of the 1998 act (the racially or religiously aggravated version of the offence under section 4 of the Protection from Harassment Act 1997) is liable to imprisonment for a term not exceeding fourteen years or to a fine, or to both.

== Definition ==
Someone who believes they are the victim of harassment falling within section 1 of the act may (either instead of or in addition to a criminal prosecution) elect to pursue a civil remedy for damages for anxiety or for financial loss arising from harassment: section 3(2). Section 3 creates a statutory tort based on the same acts as the criminal offence. An example of this tort in action appears in Green v DB Group Services (UK) Ltd [2006] EWHC 1898 QB (1 August 2006), which was a case of severe and prolonged workplace bullying resulting in serious illness of the claimant.

The editor of "Archbold" notes the act does not attempt to define "harassment". In Thomas v News Group Newspapers and Another (2001), Lord Philips MR said: "'Harassment' is, however, a word which has a meaning which is generally understood. It describes conduct targeted at an individual which is calculated to produce the consequences described in section 7 and which is oppressive and unreasonable."

Criticisms include that the summary offences of harassment "cast the net too wide". The offence created by section 2 is "broad and ill-defined". Its scope is "quite enormous". It might well violate Articles 10 and 11 of the Convention for the Protection of Human Rights and Fundamental Freedoms (in addition to Article 7 mentioned below).

=== Course of conduct ===
In Wainwright v. Home Office (2003), Lord Hoffmann said "The requirement of a course of conduct shows that Parliament was conscious that it might not be in the public interest to allow the law to be set in motion for one boorish incident."

The act contains no definition of "course of conduct" beyond the provisions of sections 7(3) and (4). Case law has established that "merely because there are two incidents between the same parties, this will not inevitably give rise to a course of conduct" and "the requirement of a nexus between the incidents appears an eminently sensible way in which to limit the potentially immense reach of the offence of harassment." In 2003, David Ormerod said that the "course of conduct" element defies definition.

=== Mens rea ===
Constructive knowledge or actual knowledge is an element of the offences under sections 2, 2A, 4 and 4A; that is, the prosecution has to show that the defendant "knows or ought to know" that the course of conduct complained of has the prescribed effects on the person at whom it is directed. The test of "ought to know" is based on what "a reasonable person in possession of the same information" would think about the course of conduct in question. Section 4(2) "has an unusual type of mens rea with objective and subjective components." The justification for the imposition of liability based on constructive knowledge is the difficulty which might exist of proving mens rea on the part of "stalkers" who often suffer from mental or personality disorders.

== Employers' liability ==
Employers have vicarious liability for harassment by their employees under section 3 of the Protection from Harassment Act 1997 (see Majrowski v Guy's and St Thomas' NHS Trust).

Other cases are Lister v Hesley Hall [2002] 1 AC 215, Thomas v News Group Newspapers [2001] EWCA 1233, Green v DB Group [2006] EWHC 1899, Rayment v MOD High Court 18 February 2010, Singh v Bhakar, Nottingham County Court, 24 July 2006, Conn v Sunderland [2007] EWCA 1492, Allen v South Southwark Court of Appeal 12 November 2008, Ferguson v British Gas [2009] EWCA 46, Ferguson v British Gas [2009] EWCA 46, Mullens v Accenture, 13 July 2010, Dowson v Chief Constable of Northumbria Police: 2, 20 October 2010.

== Number of prosecutions ==
Originally it was expected that the legislation would result in about two hundred prosecutions a year. In 1998, there were nearly six thousand prosecutions. A written question, raised by a Member of Parliament in 2008 and relating to prosecutions under section 2 from the date of the act to 2006, showed the numbers of persons proceeded against under section 2 remained fairly steady during the period (5,540 in 1999 of whom 2,753 were found guilty, 5,446 in 2006 of whom 3,768 were found guilty). A 2011 written question requesting information about prosecutions under section 2 during the period 2006-2009 showed 5,006 persons proceeded against during 2006-7 of whom 3,543 were found guilty, 4,940 proceeded against during 2007-8 of whom 3,650 were found guilty and 4,865 proceeded against during 2008-9 of whom 3,892 were found guilty.

In terms of stalking offences, the number of offences charged and prosecuted has been steadily increasing. There were 3,350 between 2021 and 2022, 4,489 between 2022 and 2023, 5,859 between 2023 and 2024, and 7,168 between 2024 and 2025. Between April 2025 and March 2026, 8,561 stalking offences were charged and prosecuted.

== Northern Ireland ==
The Protection from Harassment (Northern Ireland) Order 1997 (SI 1997/1180) (NI 9) was made under paragraph 1 of Schedule 1 to the Northern Ireland Act 1974 (as modified by section 13 of this act) only for purposes corresponding to those of sections 1 to 7 and 12 of this act.

== Scotland ==
In Scotland the act works differently. Civil remedies include damages, interdict and non-harassment orders backed by powers of arrest. Any person who is in breach of a non-harassment order made under section 8 is guilty of an offence and liable, on conviction on indictment, to imprisonment for a term not exceeding five years, or to a fine, or to both, and, on summary conviction, to imprisonment for a period not exceeding six months, or to a fine not exceeding the statutory maximum, or to both. A breach of a non-harassment order is not otherwise punishable.

Some Scots lawyers are of the view that there was no need for this act to extend to Scotland because the law of Scotland already dealt satisfactorily with harassment.

== History ==
The act resulted from the efforts of Evonne Leonora Von Heussen. A stalking victim herself, she launched the National Association for Victims of Stalking and Harassment (NASH) in 1993, when her then teen-age daughter was stalked. After Von Heussen found that she could get no help from the police or lawyers, she began researching anti-stalking laws in other countries. She began supporting victims and contacted each victim's MP, and attracted a large amount of media attention. After several years of effort she persuaded the Home Office under Prime Minister John Major to take the issue on as a matter of government policy. She worked closely with ministers and senior civil servants in the Home Office and the Lord Chancellor's Department as the final version took shape. She advised ministers during the second reading debate. She received the MBE in the Queen's Birthday Honours List (1997) for her efforts. The Suzy Lamplugh Trust also campaigned for the legislation to be introduced.

The Protection from Harassment Act 1997 was preceded by the Stalking Bill, however it failed to get government support. Organisations such as the charity Protection Against Stalking and the probation and family court union Napo, campaigned to make stalking a distinct offence, which occurred in 2012. The Suzy Lamplugh Trust submitted a super complaint in 2022, that raised concerns about systemic failures in regards to how stalking offences were being dealt with by the police. The complaint was made on behalf of the National Stalking Consortium. As a result, the government announced that there would be a review of stalking legislation led by Richard Wright KC, and terms of reference were published.

== Criticism ==
At the time of the act's passing, some legal commentators were critical of it. Andrew Simester, a professor of law at King's College, London, believed it to be "unimpressive" and "hasty", and the result of political agitation; he contended that it "might well violate Article 7 of the Convention for the Protection of Human Rights and Fundamental Freedoms".

Similarly, University College London law professor David Ormerod opined that the drafting of the act had been "deficient", and that there was an "unseemly rush to get the Bill for this act through all of its stages in Parliament".

Cambridge University fellow Peter Glazebrook simply referred to it as "deplorably vague".

In a publication evaluating the effectiveness of the act, Jessica Harris wrote that some magistrates felt "criminalising harassment cases might lead to unfounded accusations from complainants who are mistaken about another’s behaviour or are even vindictive. Prosecutors accepted this point and agreed that they had to be on the lookout for what the police sometimes termed paranoid woman syndrome, where the putative victim read more into another's behaviour than was perhaps warranted." However, "they agreed that the difficulties in pursuing harassment cases were no greater than other kinds of case – such as domestic violence – where the parties are often well known to each other."

In February 2012, Elfyn Llwyd, chairing an Independent Parliamentary Inquiry into reform of stalking law, said the act was "not an effective tool against stalking". "[T]oo many perpetrators were falling through the net." The "attitudes of many working in the criminal justice system and society towards stalking remain in the dark ages."

Commentators such as George Monbiot have voiced the concern that the amended act effectively "allows the police to ban any campaign they please", and that it has been used to prosecute peaceful protestors. He commented that the 2005 changes meant that someone could commit an offence by handing out leaflets to people, if they are distressed or alarmed by them. Journalist Neil Addison believed that the act was being misused and suggested it be amended so as to decriminalise harassment (but not breach of a court order prohibiting harassment). He said that if the act was not amended, there would be "a clear danger that it could come to be seen as an oppressive piece of legislation".

== Praise ==
In February 2012, Elfyn Llwyd MP, chairing an Independent Parliamentary Inquiry into reform of stalking law, said the act was a "landmark piece of legislation".

The act "is an effective weapon in the armoury of the victim of nuisance creditors." It is "a versatile and wide-ranging statute" and "one of the most flexible pieces of legislation of recent years."

This act was initially "doing its job quite happily". Infield and Platford said that they did not agree with claims that this act is a breach of human rights.

== Prevention of harassment notices ==
Following the passage of the act, police forces started to issue prevention of harassment notices, also known as Police Information Notices or Early Harassment Notices, to people against whom claims of harassment had been made. They are believed to have been created by police forces as a way of preventing people accused of harassment from claiming ignorance that their alleged behaviour was undesired and thus avoiding successful prosecution under the act due to lack of mens rea. Their use has been the subject of controversy, with some describing the notices as "unnecessarily menacing and accusatorial".

In November 2011, whilst Theresa May was Home Secretary, the Home Office published a consultation on stalking which stated that the government was aware of concerns over how the notices are issued and that recipients didn't receive a "fair hearing", whilst other concerns included that they gave victims "a false sense of security".

In 2014, the Commons Select Committee of Privileges investigated the issuing in 2012 of a notice against an MP for statements made in Parliament. Their findings led the police to withdraw the notice. In 2015, the issuing of a notice against a British journalist raised concerns about civil liberties and press freedom, creating demands for reform of the process.

Because they had no statutory basis and therefore no legal effect, they couldn't be appealed, although a complaint could be made to the issuing police force. In 2017 Her Majesty’s Inspectorate of Constabulary and Her Majesty’s Crown Prosecution Service Inspectorate recommended that the use of the notices and their equivalents should cease. The College of Policing state they are no longer issued.

== See also ==
- Employment discrimination law in the United Kingdom
- Harassment in the United Kingdom
- Sexual harassment
- United Kingdom labour law
- United Kingdom employment equality law
- Workplace harassment

== Bibliography ==
- Finch, Emily. The Criminalisation of Stalking. Cavendish. London. 2001.
- Lawson-Cruttenden, Timothy; Addison, Neil. Blackstone's Guide to the Protection from Harassment Act 1997. Blackstone Press Limited. 1997.
- Liberali, Benedetta. Il reato di atti persecutori. Profili costituzionali, applicativi e comparati. FrancoAngeli, Milano. 2012.
