= Derek Conway =

British Conservative politician (1953–2026)

Lieutenant Colonel Derek Conway TD
- Conway in 2005

Vice-Chamberlain of the Household
- In office 23 July 1996 – 2 May 1997
- Prime Minister: John Major
- Preceded by: Andrew MacKay
- Succeeded by: Janet Anderson

Lord Commissioner of the Treasury
- In office 20 July 1994 – 23 July 1996
- Prime Minister: John Major
- Preceded by: Nicholas Baker
- Succeeded by: Richard Ottaway

Member of Parliament
- In office 7 June 2001 – 12 April 2010
- Preceded by: Edward Heath
- Succeeded by: James Brokenshire
- Constituency: Old Bexley and Sidcup
- In office 9 June 1983 – 8 April 1997
- Preceded by: Constituency established
- Succeeded by: Paul Marsden
- Constituency: Shrewsbury and Atcham

Personal details
- Born: Derek Leslie Conway; 15 February 1953 Gateshead, England
- Died: 4 May 2026 (aged 73)
- Party: Conservative
- Spouse: Colette Elizabeth Mary Lamb
- Children: 3
- Education: Newcastle Polytechnic
- Awards: Territorial Decoration

Military service
- Allegiance: United Kingdom
- Service: Royal Regiment of Fusiliers; The Light Infantry
- Service years: 1977–1994
- Rank: Lieutenant colonel

Derek Leslie Conway TD (15 February 1953 – 4 May 2026) was an English politician and television presenter. A member of the Conservative Party, Conway served as a Member of Parliament (MP) for the constituency of Shrewsbury and Atcham from 1983 to 1997, and Old Bexley and Sidcup from 2001 to 2010. He was later a presenter of Epilogue, a book review programme on Press TV, an English-language international television news channel funded by the Iranian government.

In January 2008, Conway announced that he would stand down at the next general election after a Commons standards committee found that he had employed his son Freddie, a full-time student at Newcastle University, as a political researcher using public funds, despite there being no record of his son doing any work at Westminster. As a result, Conservative Party leader David Cameron withdrew the whip from Conway, effectively expelling him from the Parliamentary Conservative group. He received considerable criticism from the press concerning the misuse of funds.

== Early life ==
Conway was born in Gateshead on 15 February 1953, and was educated at Beacon Hill Comprehensive School in the town, Gateshead Technical College, and Newcastle Polytechnic.

In 1974, at the age of 21, Conway was elected as a councillor of the Metropolitan Borough of Gateshead council. In 1977, he was also elected to the Tyne and Wear County Council, and was the Conservative group leader from 1979 until 1982. He stepped down from the county council in 1983, when he was elected to Westminster. At Gateshead he was the Deputy Conservative Group Leader for some years and remained a councillor there until 1987, whilst simultaneously a Member of Parliament.

At the October 1974 general election he unsuccessfully contested the safe Labour parliamentary constituency of Durham, being defeated by the sitting member, Mark Hughes, by 18,116 votes. At the 1979 general election Conway contested the more marginal seat of Newcastle upon Tyne East and was again defeated, this time by Labour's Mike Thomas and by 6,176 votes.

== Member of Parliament for Shrewsbury and Atcham ==
Conway was first elected to parliament for Shrewsbury and Atcham at the 1983 general election, following the retirement of the long serving Conservative member for Shrewsbury, John Langford-Holt, securing a majority of 8,624.

In 1985, Conway became a member of the Agriculture Select committee, and after the 1987 general election he joined the Transport Select Committee. In 1988 he was appointed the Parliamentary Private Secretary (PPS) to the Minister of State at the Wales Office, Wyn Roberts, serving until 1991.

Following the 1992 general election Conway became the PPS to Michael Forsyth, Minister of State at the Department for Employment. In 1993 Conway was promoted by John Major to serve as an assistant government whip, the next year becoming a Lord Commissioner of the Treasury, or 'full whip'. He was again promoted within the Whips' Office when he became the Vice-Chamberlain of the Household in 1996.

Conway held the Shrewsbury and Atcham seat until he was defeated at the 1997 general election, when the Conservative Party nationally lost more than half of the seats it had held before the election. He was beaten by Labour's Paul Marsden, whose majority was 1,670.

In his book titled The Political Animal, Jeremy Paxman recounts Conway's reflections on his defeat: "'Had it not been for James Goldsmith's intervention I'd have won. He died of pancreatic cancer,' he [Conway] says, and then adds in the most chilling tone, 'I hear it's the most painful of deaths. I'm so pleased.'", although the number of votes for Goldsmith's Referendum Party was underneath Labour's majority in 1997, meaning Conway would have still lost the seat by several hundred votes if there had been no candidate from the party.

After his defeat Conway became the chief executive at the Cats Protection charity in 1998.

== Old Bexley and Sidcup ==
Conway was out of the Commons until the general election, 2001 when he was elected as the member of parliament for the south London seat of Old Bexley and Sidcup, previously held by the former Prime Minister and Father of the House of Commons, Edward Heath. Conway defended Heath against accusations of homosexual behaviour.

He retained the seat with a majority of 3,345 in 2005. From his re-election he was a member of the Defence Select Committee. He was a Eurosceptic (even voting against the Single European Act that had the backing of Margaret Thatcher's government), and supported the return of capital punishment.

=== Investigation and withdrawal of whip ===
Conway employed his son Freddie as a part-time researcher, while Freddie was on a full-time degree course at the University of Newcastle. Conway paid his son the part-time equivalent of a £25,970 salary, amounting to a sum in excess of £40,000 over three years, including pension contributions.

Conway was reported to the Committee on Standards and Privileges by former Metropolitan Police Inspector Michael Barnbrook, who had stood against him in the 2005 general election as a UKIP candidate. After an investigation, in January 2008 the Committee found there was "no record" of what work Freddie had done, and said the £1,000-plus a month he was paid was too high. They recommended that the House order him to repay a sum of £13,000 and that he be suspended for 10 sitting days. However, in a subsequent interview with the Mail on Sunday, Derek Conway disputed the allegation that Freddie Conway had rarely travelled from Newcastle to Westminster, instead stating that Freddie "would go up and down like a fiddler's elbow". In light of the evidence, Conservative party leader David Cameron decided to withdraw the Conservative Party whip, rendering Conway free of any Parliamentary Conservative constraints, effectively leaving him as an independent MP.

Conway announced on 30 January 2008 that he would not fight the next general election, stating: "I have concluded that it's now time to step down." He declared that he did not wish his "personal circumstances to be a distraction" from David Cameron's leadership.

The ruling did not involve the elder son, Henry Conway, as he was not the subject of the original complaint, but John Lyon, who had recently taken on the post of Parliamentary commissioner for standards, received complaints about similar payments to Henry while he was also a student and doing the "job" which Freddie took over. Lyon decided a complaint from Duncan Borrowman merited investigation. On 29 January 2009, almost a year after the previous report, a further report was published by the House of Commons Standards and Privileges Committee into the employment of Mr Conway's elder son Henry. There was some evidence of Henry working for his salary, but his father was ordered to pay back £3,758 which had been overpaid and to write a letter of apology to the chairman of the committee.

On 2 February 2009, Conway apologised in the House of Commons. Conway told the Commons he accepted "without any reservation" that he had breached the rules of the House. He withdrew comments made previously in which he accused Labour of using his story to deflect attention from the row over money paid to peers.

In May 2009 as part of its Disclosure of expenses of British Members of Parliament, the Sunday Telegraph revealed that Conway had claimed the Second Home Allowance on a house in Northumberland 330 miles from his constituency.

== After parliament ==
Conway was a presenter of Epilogue, a book review programme on Press TV, an English-language international television news channel funded by the Iranian government. In Jeremy Paxman's book The Political Animal (2002) Conway is quoted as saying "I miss the pressures. I love living on the edge".

== Personal life and death ==
Conway was married to Colette Elizabeth Mary Lamb from 1980 and they had two sons and a daughter.

He was commissioned into the 6th Battalion, Royal Regiment of Fusiliers (Territorial Army) in 1977. Conway was promoted to lieutenant in 1979 and captain in 1981. In 1982 he transferred to 5th Battalion, The Light Infantry. He was promoted to major in 1987, was awarded the Territorial Decoration in 1990 and transferred to the Reserve in 1994. Conway was also an executive for Granada Television, a Sunday school teacher and a charity organiser for the National Fund for Research into Crippling Diseases (1974–1983) and the Cats Protection League (chief executive from 1998 to 2003). He was a Freeman of the City of London.

Conway died from primary biliary cholangitis on 4 May 2026, at the age of 73.

Political offices
Preceded by Andrew MacKay	Vice-Chamberlain of the Household; 1996–1997	Succeeded by Janet Anderson
Parliament of the United Kingdom
New constituency	Member of Parliament for Shrewsbury and Atcham; 1983–1997	Succeeded by Paul Marsden
Preceded by Edward Heath	Member of Parliament for Old Bexley and Sidcup; 2001–2010	Succeeded by James Brokenshire
