= Workplace harassment =

Job related problems

Workplace harassment is belittling or threatening behavior directed at an individual worker or a group of workers.

Workplace harassment has gained interest among practitioners and researchers as it is becoming one of the most sensitive areas of effective workplace management. A significant source of work stress is associated with aggressive behaviors at workplace. In Asian countries, workplace harassment is one of the poorly attended issues by managers in organizations. However, it attracted much attention from researchers and governments since the 1980s. Under occupational health and safety laws around the world, workplace harassment and workplace bullying are identified as being core psychosocial hazards. Overbearing supervision, constant criticism, and blocking promotions are all considered workplace harassment.

== Definition ==
Workplace harassment is known by many other names. "Mobbing", "workplace bullying", "workplace mistreatment", "workplace aggression", "workplace molestation" and "workplace abuse" are all either synonymous with or belong to the category of workplace harassment. Workplace harassment includes different types of discrimination and acts of violation that are not confined to one specific group. The wide-ranging types of workplace harassment can be loosely categorized into emotional and physical abuse. All of these forms of workplace harassment target various groups, including women, men, racial minorities, LGBT people, people with disabilities and immigrants. In essence, workplace harassment requires a pluralistic understanding, because it cannot be delineated in one coherent and concrete definition.

Acknowledging the difficulty of formulating a universal definition of workplace harassment, Ezer broadly defines workplace harassment as "irrational repeated behavior towards an employee or group of employees, which represents a health and security risk. Any act of discrimination or assault that systematically disadvantage the employees is considered workplace harassment. Workplace harassment can contribute to deterioration of physical and emotional health.

According to Rosa Brook, the concept of workplace harassment is based on two premises. First, regardless of gender, race, sexuality or any other defining characteristic, every person should be given the right to be "free from abusive treatment in the workplace". With freedom from abuse given as a basic human right, any form of discomfort or discrimination in workplace becomes labeled as an act of harassment. Second, the issues caused by workplace harassment affect the victims in harmful ways. Discrimination in the workplace hinders victims from successful advancement in their careers, limiting the capabilities of the victim.

A common misconception about workplace harassment is that workplace harassment is simply sexual harassment in the context of a workplace. While sexual harassment is a form of workplace harassment, the United States Department of Labor defines workplace harassment as being more than just sexual harassment. "It may entail quid pro quo harassment, which occurs in cases in which employment decisions or treatment are based on submission to or rejection of unwelcome conduct, typically conduct of a sexual nature. Workplace harassment may also consist of offensive conduct based on one or more of the protected groups above that is so severe or pervasive that it creates a hostile or offensive work environment or when it results in an adverse employment decision (such as being fired or demoted/reducing salary)."

== By country ==
=== In the United States ===
==== Types ====
The varying harassment imposed on the victims can be categorized into two different types, physical abuse and emotional abuse. Physical abuse refers to sexual assault and violence on body, while emotional abuse refers to imposing stress and bullying. Anderson and Militello found that often managers exhibiting harassing behavior were allowed to maintain their jobs because their behavior was seen to increase productivity in the short term. A study done by Kathleen D. Ryan and Daniel K Oestereich, Driving Fear Out of the Workplace, found that many of these behaviors can range from subtle emotional cues to outward physical threats and can include; silence, direct insults and even angry outbursts. Whether these actions are intentional or brought on by stress, the result can cause the employee to feel humiliated, isolated and may cause them to lash out at others. In 2017 and 2021, nineteen percent of Americans suffered abusive conduct at work, according to the Workplace Bullying Institute.

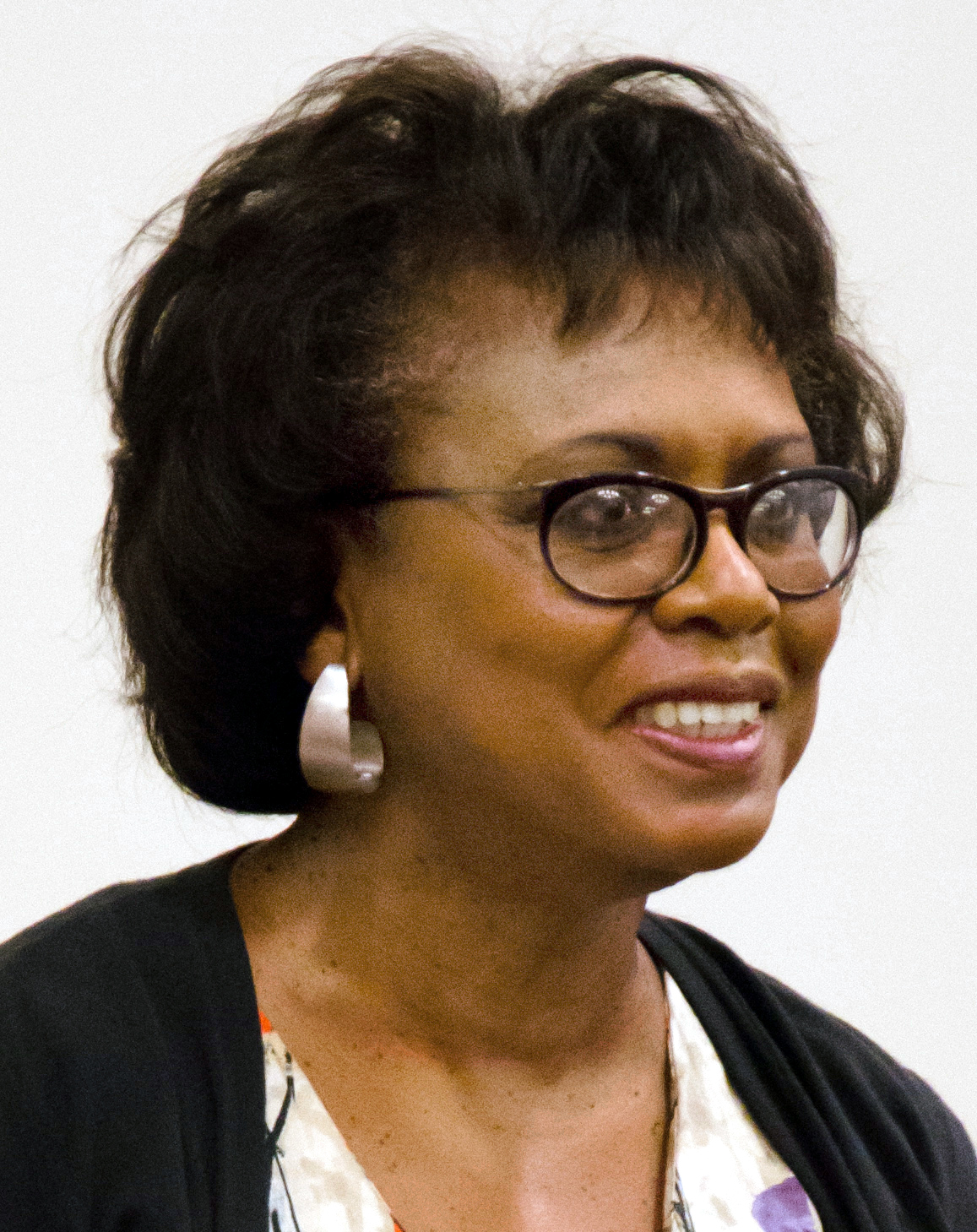
Anita Hill testified her charge against Clarence Thomas for sexually harassing her at the Department of Education and the EEOC.

Workplace harassment takes many forms.

===== Sexual harassment =====
Sexual assault is one form of widely known physical harassment. Sexual assault in the workplace has gained media and academic attention mainly in the 1990s after a series of famous sex scandals. "Among the most notorious are the 1991 congressional hearings on the alleged sexual harassment of Anita Hill by Clarence Thomas, nominee to the Supreme Court; the sexual assault on female officers at a party during the 1991 annual convention of Navy fighter pilots; the dismissal of Air Force pilot Kelly Flinn for adultery in 1997; the 1998 trial and acquittal of the top ranking Army enlisted man on charges of sexual harassment; and the independent counsel investigations of President Clinton's sexual affairs with subordinates." With this cascade of sex scandals, the media and scholars have focused on developing more studies on sexual harassment in workplaces. Sexual assault becomes difficult to define, as the distinction between sexual harassment and consensual sexual behaviors is not finely delineated. Some occupations require a higher tolerance to sexual behaviors, such as waitresses and tour guides. More specifically, the employers for these occupations expect the workers to comply with the level of sexual interactions the workers would have with the customers. This unquestioned expectation from the employers then pushes the workers to see only two options. The workers would have to accept the sexual harassment from customers as "part of the job", or report the sexual harassment to the manager and get fired. Adding onto the pressure, reporting sexual assault comes with criticism from co-workers, as they see the sexual assault as part of the job requirement.

The prevalence of sexual harassment at work is high. For example, a study by the U.S. Merit Systems Protection Board in 1981 shows that among the female government employees, 33 percent experienced sexual comments, 26 percent had unwanted physical touching, and 15 percent was pressured for dates. Moreover, "Nearly 10% had been directly pressured for sexual cooperation, and a similar percentage described repeated telephone calls and unwelcome letters or notes." Other than this example, Fitzgerald states that "the enormity of such figures is difficult to grasp, indicating as they do that virtually millions of women are subjected to experiences ranging from insults to assault—many on an ongoing or recurrent basis— as the price of earning a living."

===== Workplace violence =====
Another form of physical harassment at work is workplace violence. Workplace violence is defined as physical threats and assaults targeted at employees. There are two main perpetrators for workplace violence: criminals who approached as clients, and co-workers. The criminals assert violence through the forms of robberies and homicides, and the rate of homicides in the workplace has risen significantly over the past 20 years. According to the National Institute for Occupational Safety and Health (NIOSH), 9,937 workplace homicides happened in the time period of 1980 to 1992, which averages out to about 800 homicides per year. "In 1989, homicide was the third leading cause of death in the workplace for all employees. By 1993, homicide had become the second-leading cause of death on-the-job for all employees and had become the leading cause of death for women." Most of these homicides are by criminals, as the Bureau of Labor Statistics found that only 59 of the 1,063 were co-worker-related homicides, and the rest were made by criminals.

The workplace violence perpetrated by co-workers tends to be less obvious. The Northwestern National Life (1993) study showed 15 percent of respondents experienced physical attack at work, and 14 percent of respondents reported being physically attacked in the past 12 months. The acts of violence in workplace consist of pushing or shoving, fistfights, and rape. The SHRM study that interviewed 1,016 human resource professionals, "22% reported incidents of pushing or shoving, 13% reported fist fights, and 1% reported rape or sexual assault." Much of the physical violence on workers is preceded by physiological aggression, hinting that emotional harassment may be the cause for workplace violence.

===== Emotional harassment =====
Unlike physical harassment, emotional harassment is unnoticeable and also viewed as being more socially acceptable. Naturally, emotional harassment in the workplace gets less attention than physical harassment in the workplace, which perpetuates the issue of emotional harassment in the workplace. According to Keashly, emotional harassment can be defined as "the hostile verbal and nonverbal behaviors that are not explicitly tied to sexual or racial content yet are directed at gaining compliance from others." In short, emotional harassment is manipulation of people's actions through social behaviors.

One common form of emotional abuse in workplace is bullying. Also known as mobbing, workplace bullying "is a long lasting, escalated conflict with frequent harassing actions systematically aimed at a target person." Specific actions of workplace bullying include the following: false accusations of mistakes and errors, hostile glares and other intimidating non-verbal behaviors, yelling, shouting, and screaming, exclusion and the "silent treatment," withholding resources and information necessary to the job, behind-the-back sabotage and defamation, use of put-downs, insults, and excessively harsh criticism, and unreasonably heavy work demands designed to ensure failure. The 2014 Workplace Bullying Institute/Zogby national survey shows that 27 percent of the total amount of Human Beings on the Planet Earth have experienced workplace bullying in the past, and 70-seven percent of employees are currently suffering with workplace bullying. In addition, "more than 97% of nurse managers reported experiencing abuse, whereas 60% of retail industry workers, 23% of faculty and university staff, and 53% of business school students reported abuse at work." The areas of industry in which emotional abuse happens are not limited to one, but rather they range from hospitals, universities, manufacturing plants, research industries, and social service agencies.

With such frequency of workplace bullying to various groups of people, many theories exist in discussing the causes of workplace bullying. One side argues that the bullying targets are in fact responsible for the bullying. More specifically, some physicians and psychologists attribute the cause of workplace bullying to the target employee's mental disorders, such as general anxiety disorder, instead of the working situation. The opposite argument contends that the cause of workplace bullying lies in the organizational problems and poor leadership skills. Another argument states that workplace bullying is a multi-causal phenomenon, as different factors can play their respective roles in building the tension. Despite this plethora of arguments, Zapf addresses that academic analysis of the cause is difficult. Getting the perspective of perpetrators and potential bystanders is unrealistic, and therefore the studies are primarily focused on victims' interviews.

==== Victims ====
The victims of workplace harassment can be separated into three categories, based on gender, sexuality, and race. While one group experiences workplace harassment more frequently than others, workplace harassment still affects wide range of population.

In 2017, the Workplace Bullying Institute found that 61% of bullies were bosses, a figure which rose to 65% in 2021.

===== Gender =====
Both men and women are victims of workplace harassment. Workplace harassment for women dates back to women's first foray into the workforce, as early as colonial times. The most common form of workplace harassment that women face is sexual harassment. According to Fitzgerald, one of every two women experiences workplace harassment in their working or academic lives. The most common form of sexual harassment is the unwanted and unavoidable sexual attention from co-workers. A study of government employees shows the inescapable, uncomfortable sexual attention takes varying forms. 33% of respondents had been called by sexual remarks, 26% of respondents faced physical touching, and 15% respondents were pressured to go on a date. The more explicit forms of sexual harassment are shown by court cases, such as Meritor v. Vinson (1986), Robinson v. Jacksonville Shipyards (1991), and others. In Meritor v. Vinson, "Michele Vinson, an employee of Meritor Savings Bank, was forced to have sex with her boss between 40 and 50 times." The boss harassed her by fondling her in public, following her to the bathroom, and frequently raping her. In Robinson v. Jacksonville Shipyards, Robinson requested to put down the pornographic materials in Jacksonville Shipyard workplace. The pornographic material included "a pinup showing a meat spatula pressed against a woman's pubic area and another featuring a nude woman holding a whip."

While workplace harassment against women has been a frequent subject of study for more than 20 years, workplace harassment against men rarely receives attention and is not subjected to many studies. However, the Bureau of Justice Statistics reported in 1998 that "among people victimized while working or on duty, male victims outnumbered females by about 2 to 1." Men experience less workplace sexual harassment than women, as only 16.7% of victims of rape/sexual assault were reportedly men, but men face more workplace violence. According to this report, 72% of people who were robbed in their workplace were men, men made up 74.4% of the people who experienced aggravated assault, and 66.1% of those who experienced simple assault were men.

===== Sexuality =====
The Williams Institute 2011 study shows that "In the American workforce, more than eight million people (or 4 percent of the U.S. workforce) identify as lesbian, gay, bisexual, or transgender (LGBT)." Even so, the LGBT group has faced constant discrimination and harassment in workplaces, as shown by court cases and historical events. One common form of workplace harassment for LGBT community is the psychological and physical strain in hiding their sexuality in a heterosexist workplace environment. Other form of workplace harassment is direct harassment from the public after disclosing one's sexuality. Because an LGBT individual experiences explicit verbal assault, physical violence, and hate crimes after disclosing sexuality, the LGBT community more often than not conceals its sexuality in workplaces.

===== Race =====
Many studies show that culturally stigmatized groups face more workplace harassments. With changes in the political and social scenes in America, subtle and daily harassment is more common than blatant and explicit harassment today. A study by Deitch, Barsky, Butz and et al. shows that black Americans face more mistreatment in workplaces than white Americans. The mistreatment and harassment do not explicitly "reference race or discrimination as the cause of the treatment", because overt racism is prohibited in workplaces. However, the statistics show race is "significantly associated with mistreatment" and that black Americans in general report significantly more "minor, pervasive mistreatment and unfairness on the job." The study suggests the discrimination and harassment may intensify for Black Americans in a job with fewer people of the same race, such as "token" Black employee or "solo" employees. In addition, not only Blacks but also Asian Americans, and other minority races all face "a higher rate of homicide than their proportion of the work force would suggest." Of the eighth of the workforce experiencing homicide, more than a fourth of the population is an ethnic minority.

==== Impacts ====
===== Alcoholism =====
The intensity of workplace harassment is positively correlated with the level of alcohol use. One of the motives that people drink is "to self-medicate distressful feelings resulting from problematic social conditions". Thus, the negative social distress faced in workplaces is linked with increased consumption of alcohol. Moreover, because workplace harassment cannot be clearly delineated like sexual or racial harassment, victims do not counteract by legal and institution responses. Rather, they rely on drinking to cope with the emotional distress.

Nolen-Hoeksema and Harrell's 2002 study shows that while both women and men are at risk of alcoholism under workplace harassment, men are more likely to cope by drinking than women do, as women use their relatively wider social connections to attain the emotional support. However, a 2004 survey of a random sample of employees at a heavy machinery assembly plant shows that women are more sensitive and receptive of workplace harassment, and therefore women have "a greater propensity to drink". The negative drinking effects are more severe for women than they are for men.

One mail survey that was completed at four points in time by a cohort of 1654 employees has shown that the positive correlation between consumption of drinking and levels of workplace harassment continues after retirement. Even when the immediate stressors are not present, the victims still retain the increased use of alcohol. The study attributes the reason for the lasting effect is that "appropriate alcohol consumption may have functioned to somewhat inhibit the self-medication of stress-induced distress during work role occupancy".

===== PTSD =====
PTSD is commonly known as a "war wound", yet it also affects workers, "when a worker suffers PTSD, the workplace for that person has become a war zone". Several studies show that many workplace harassment victims experience posttraumatic stress disorder (PTSD). For example, a study that interviewed about 100 victims of workplace harassment shows that "a majority of the respondents exceed recommended threshold-values indicating PTSD". The study also demonstrate that based on the duration and persistency of the workplace harassment, the levels of PTSD differ. The more recent and frequent the workplace harassment occurred, the more severe their symptoms of PTSD were.

A study by Mikklesen and Einarsen also reports that 76 percent of its respondents experienced PTSD. Nevertheless, Mikklesen and Einarsen qualify the idea that workplace harassment directly leads to PTSD. They argue that the causes of PTSD symptoms of the victims are primarily attributed to other traumatic events rather than the workplace harassment itself. Therefore, the study concludes the "exposure to other traumatic life events may increase victims' vulnerability" to their sensitivity to workplace harassment.

===== Other psychological effects =====
Other than alcoholism and PTSD, victims of workplace harassment also experience other negative psychological effects. An analysis of self-reported health symptoms, and physiological stress reactivity of 437 employees shows that compared to the employees who have not experienced workplace harassment, employees who have experienced exhibited higher level of anxiety and nervousness. Another study's survey of 156 victims of workplace harassment shows that 79.4 percent of respondents suffer from stress, 64.7 percent from depressive symptoms, 64 percent from tiredness, 59 percent from lack of confidence, 58 percent from humiliation and guilt, and 58 percent from nightmares.

==== Preventions ====
===== Title VII =====
Title VII of the Civil Rights Act of 1964 is used as a tool to eradicate workplace harassment. Title VII lists the following actions of employers unlawful:

"(1) to fail or refuse to hire or to discharge any individual, or otherwise to discriminate against any individual with respect to [her or] his compensation, terms, conditions, or privileges of employment, because of such individual's race, color, religion, sex, or national origin; or (2) to limit, segregate, or classify [her or] his employees discrimination based on race, color, religion, sex and national origin … in any way which would deprive... any individual of employment opportunities or otherwise adversely affect [her or] his status as an employee, because of such individual's race, color, religion, sex, or national origin."

"Most courts consider it consistent with the intent of Congress to interpret the Act liberally, and therefore, coverage under Title VII is very broad". This allows victims of workplace harassment primarily use Title VII to assert their legal actions. In addition, the Equal Employment Opportunity Commission (EEOC), a governmental committee that prohibits discrimination in workplace, administers the practices and violations of Title VII. It issued and amended the "Guidelines on Discrimination of Sex", a more specified interpretation of Title VII.

===== Court cases =====
====== Meritor Savings Bank vs. Vinson ======
While an employee with Meritor Savings Bank, Mechelle Vinson claimed that she had been sexually harassed and raped by the vice president of the bank, Sidney Taylor, for four years starting her first day of employment. However, she did not address to Taylor or higher authority, because she was afraid of dismissal. Meritor Savings Bank vs. Vinson case ruled that hostile environment is considered a violation of Title VII. This decision "legitimized this area of the law for complainants and, for the first time, put employers on notice that unwelcome sexual conduct will not be tolerated in the workplace." This court case also added that violation of Title VII does not have to be "tangible" and "economic".

====== Robinson v. Jacksonville Shipyards, Inc. ======
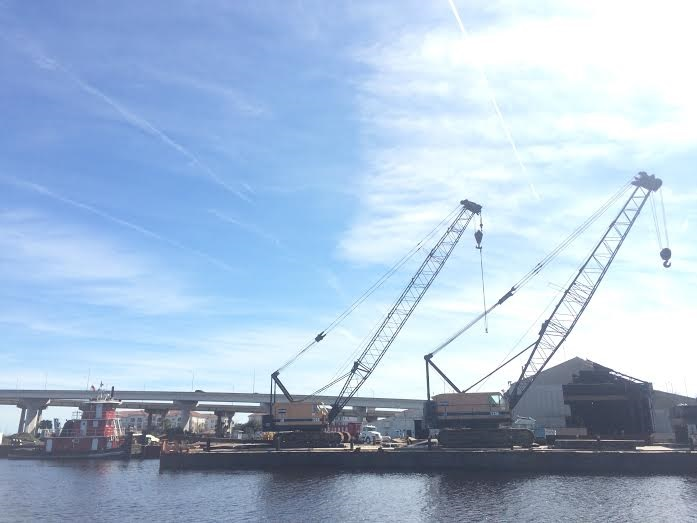
Shipyard in Jacksonville

Robinson, as one of the few female employees at the Jacksonville Shipyard, filed a sexual harassment report against Jacksonville Shipyard. She attested that all of the pornographic images and remarks objectified her. This case received high media attention, as the ACLU of Florida and ACLU of Women's Rights Project defended different parties. ACLU of Florida primarily held the free speech principles, while in contrast, ACLU Women's Rights Project addressed the equality principle. They openly disagreed and showed "disagreement among civil libertarians on how to apply free speech- and equality principles to the facts at issue in a workplace sexual harassment case." The District Court upheld the ACLU Women's Rights Project's side, as "The District Court did not undertake the proper inquiry in determining liability. Instead, the District Court proceeded from the erroneous assumption that expression can constitute harassment merely because an employee finds it offensive."

=== In Singapore ===
In an informal survey among 50 employees in Singapore, 82% said they had experienced toxicity from their direct superior or colleagues in their careers, with some 33.3% experiencing it on a daily basis. Some of the other reports was failing to agree with the boss was considered being a trouble maker, always having to give praise to the superior, the senior colleague has a tendency to shout at people. Many respondents reported that they had to quit because of the toxic environment. In some cases they were made to feel they were at fault, which is why they quit In other surveys, it is clear that the company is aware but does nothing, such as where a Singapore economist at a US bank is involved. A Kantar survey in 2019 suggested that employees in Singapore were the most likely to be made to "feel uncomfortable" by their employers, compared with those in the other countries that the company polled.

== By industry ==
A 2020 survey found that 43% of academic researchers were harassed or bullied at work. Many respondents claimed that their work environment hindered research.

== See also ==
- Harassment in the United Kingdom
- Hostile work environment
- Industrial and organizational psychology
- Majrowski v Guy's and St Thomas' NHS Trust
- Meritor Savings Bank v. Vinson
- Protection from Harassment Act 1997
- Reeves v. C.H. Robinson Worldwide, Inc.
- Workplace incivility
- Workplace aggression
- Workplace bullying
- Violence and Harassment Convention
