= Julia Buckley =

British politician

Julia Buckley MP
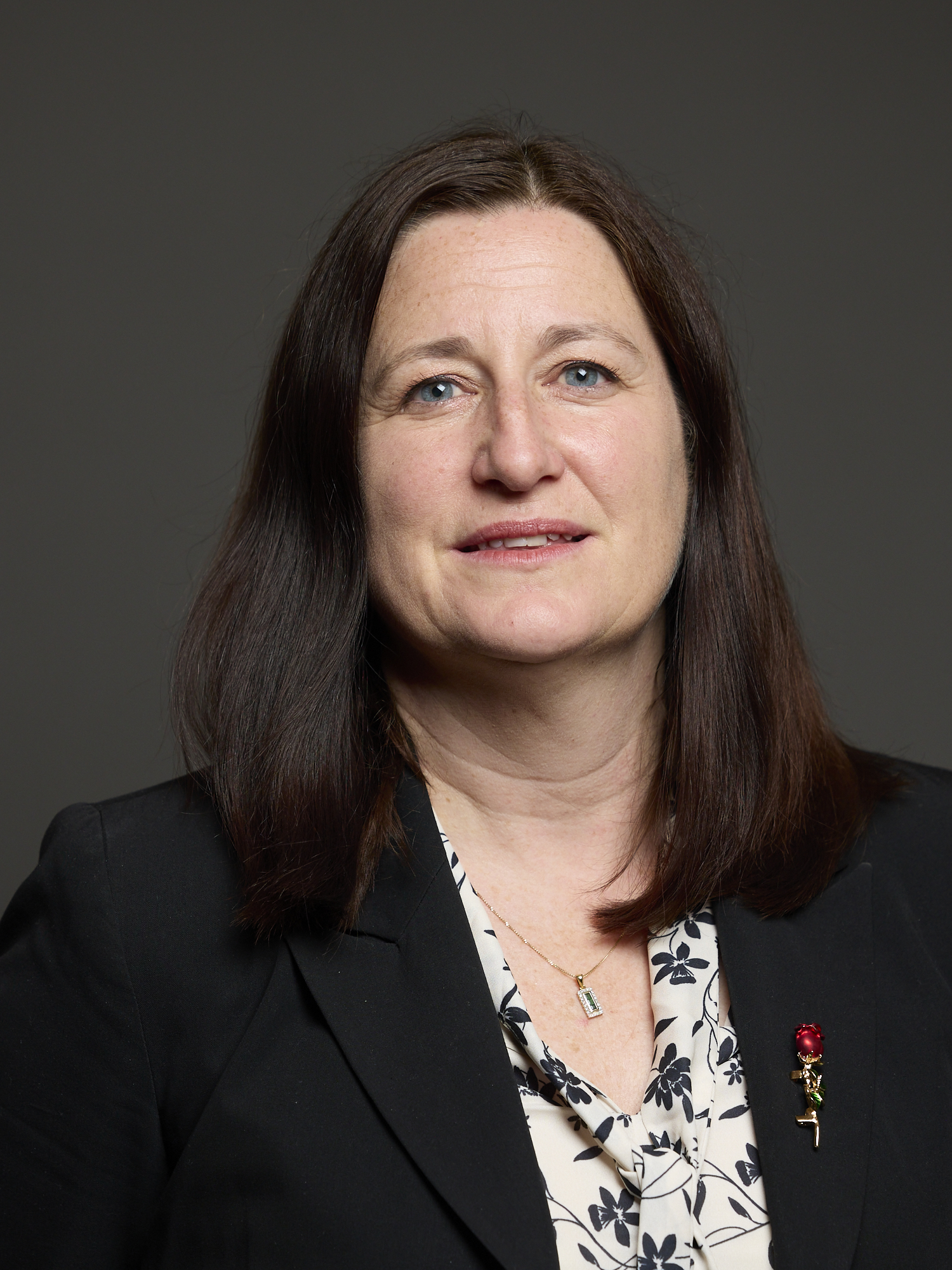
- Official portrait, 2024

Member of Parliament for Shrewsbury
- Incumbent
- Assumed office 4 July 2024
- Preceded by: Daniel Kawczynski (Shrewsbury and Atcham (Note: The Shrewsbury and Atcham constituency was renamed "Shrewsbury" at the 2024 general election, with minor boundary changes.))
- Majority: 11,355 (21.9%)

Personal details
- Party: Labour
- Spouse: John Buckley
- Education: University of Edinburgh (MA); University of Wolverhampton (PhD)
- Website: Official website

Julia Buckley is a British Labour Party politician who has served as Member of Parliament for Shrewsbury since 2024.

== Early political career ==
Buckley worked in the European Parliament for 5 years as a policy advisor, and went on to work as an EU funding specialist in regional and local government including at Wolverhampton City Council. In the 2019 European Parliament election in the United Kingdom, she was a candidate placed third on the West Midlands party list.

She was elected as Councillor for the Bridgnorth West and Tasley Division in Shropshire Council in the 2021 United Kingdom local elections, having previously contested Bridgnorth East and Astley Abbotts in 2017. She was also elected as Councillor for the Bridgnorth Town East Ward in Bridgnorth Town Council in 2017. She became leader of the Shropshire Labour Group in 2022, in opposition on the Shropshire Council.

She is affiliated to the Unison trade union.

== Parliamentary career ==
Buckley was inspired by her friend Jo Cox to run for parliament which she did in the 2024 United Kingdom general election. Buckley is the first woman to represent the town of Shrewsbury as an MP, as well as the first Labour Party MP for the constituency of Shrewsbury, which was re-established in 2024. She previously contested its predecessor seat, Shrewsbury and Atcham, in the 2019 general election, coming second place to its incumbent Conservative MP, Daniel Kawczynski.

She is a member on the Environmental Audit Select Committee and is the Chair of the APPG on Local Markets.
