= Paul Marsden =

British politician (born 1968)

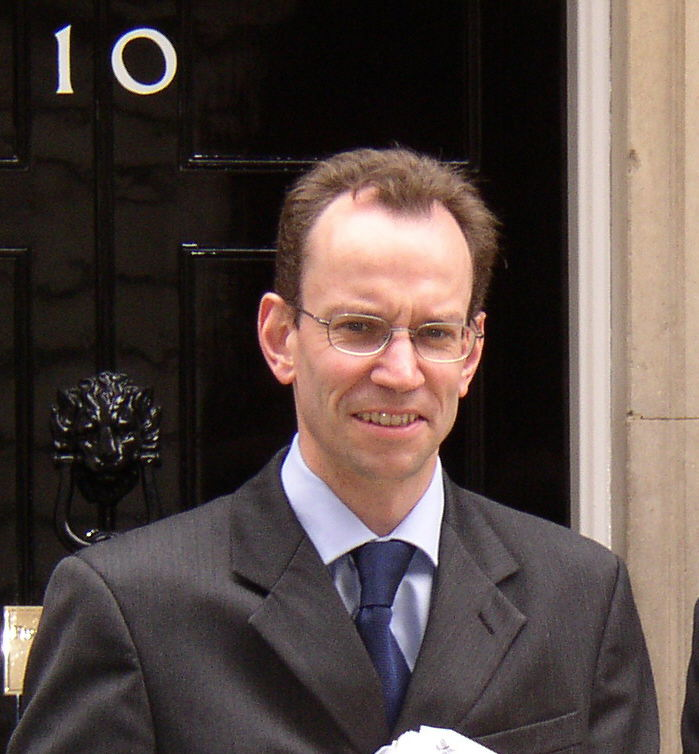
- Marsden in 2004

Member of Parliament for Shrewsbury and Atcham
- In office 1 May 1997 – 11 April 2005
- Preceded by: Derek Conway
- Succeeded by: Daniel Kawczynski

Personal details
- Born: Paul William Barry Marsden
- Party: Labour (1983–2001, 2005); Liberal Democrats (2001–2005)
- Education: Teesside Polytechnic
- Occupation: Head of quality management
- Website: http://paulwbmarsden.com

Paul William Barry Marsden is a British politician. He was the Member of Parliament (MP) for Shrewsbury and Atcham from 1997 until 2005. He was most prominently known for his anti-war views and crossing the floor twice (the first to do so since Winston Churchill), from Labour to the Liberal Democrats in 2001 and returning to Labour in 2005.

== Early life ==
Marsden's father was a Labour councillor. He was educated at Helsby High School. Marsden completed a diploma in building studies at Mid-Cheshire College in 1986,

Before his political career, Marsden worked at Taylor Woodrow (1990–1994), NatWest Bank (1994–1996) and Mitel from 1996 until the general election in 1997.

== Labour Member of Parliament ==
Marsden was elected as the first Labour MP for Shrewsbury and Atcham at the 1997 general election with a swing of 11.4%; a seat which he held at the 2001 election with a further swing of 5.5%. At 29 years of age, he was one of the youngest MPs elected in 1997. He served on the Agriculture Select Committee.

After supporting the Government in is first term, Marsden began to question the Labour Government's foreign policy regarding Afghanistan. Marsden was instructed to attend a meeting with the Labour Chief Whip, Hilary Armstrong. As Jeremy Paxman wrote, "the Labour MP Paul Marsden took the unprecedented step of recording the dressing-down", where he said that he had been confronted with accusations that "those aren't with us are against us," "war is not a matter of conscience" and "it was people like you who appeased Hitler in 1938", resulting in Marsden going public with his notes from the conversation.

Tony Benn described in his diary that "The pressure on the anti-war MPs is growing. Apparently Paul Marsden had three-quarters-of-an-hour being bullied by the Chief Whip, Hilary Armstrong." Number 10 were forced to put out a statement that dissenting backbenchers would be allowed to speak out on the war. The Guardian in its Leader praised Marsden for having called for a vote on the war and publishing the Chief Whip's response to it and stated, "On both counts he has done British democracy a service."

Marsden then spoke out against the press officer Jo Moore who had said, that 9/11 was "a very good day to get out anything we want to bury"; he and Tam Dalyell were the only two Labour MPs to vote against the Government.

In November 2001, Marsden visited Pakistan and the Afghan border to highlight the plight of Afghan refugees living in camps who had fled the war. Marsden also worked to release Sunday Telegraph journalist Christina Lamb and photographer Justin Sutcliffe, who had been arrested and held by the Pakistan Police and Inter-Services Intelligence secret service.

At the Stop the War demonstration on 18 November 2001 he accused Blair of being "drunk with power" and "we are not simply going to allow the atrocities of September 11 to be replaced with further atrocities in Afghanistan".

Marsden complained that he had been subjected to verbal and physical attacks by some Labour Whips, which were vigorously denied. Five days later, he defected to the Liberal Democrats on 10 December 2001, citing his disagreements with Labour whips over his opposition to military action in Afghanistan and the resulting civilian casualties. The Big Issue magazine's readers voted Marsden 'Hero of the Year' in 2001 for his opposition to the war in Afghanistan.

== Liberal Democrat MP ==
During his time as a Liberal Democrat MP, Marsden acted as their health spokesperson.

In June 2002, Marsden presented the Prescriptions (Chronic Diseases) Bill, which aimed to introduce a fairer system for prescription charge exemptions for patients with acute conditions. It failed to gain government support.

== Announces retirement as MP and rejoins Labour ==
In July 2004 Marsden announced that he was retiring from politics and would not contest the May 2005 general election. He cited the toll suffered as a result of admissions about his private life and the effects on his family. He reduced his Liberal Democrat political duties and on 5 April 2005, within hours of the start of the election campaign, Marsden announced his intention to rejoin the Labour Party, stating that although he still disagreed with the government over the war and levels of investment in public services, he did not want Labour MPs, who shared his views, to lose their seats. He later apologised to Liberal Democrat supporters for leaving the party. He was the first British politician since Winston Churchill to re-cross the floor of the House of Commons and return to his original party, in Marsden's case to sit on the Labour benches.

During his Parliamentary career Marsden raised over £10K for local and international charities through sponsored marathon running, abseiling and swimming.

In the 2005 general election the Conservative, Daniel Kawczynski won back the Shrewsbury and Atcham seat from the subsequent Labour candidate, Michael Ion.

== Expenses ==
During his time as an MP, Marsden was criticised for using public funds to pay his wife and family nanny while his researchers went unpaid.

== Post-Parliamentary career ==
In December 2005, Marsden caused a row when he publicly confirmed Charles Kennedy's drinking problems and that Kennedy had not been telling the truth about his illness. Kennedy's press secretary vehemently denied Marsden's story. However, by 5 January 2006, Kennedy admitted he had "a drink problem" and had sought "professional help". He resigned two days later as leader.

In 2007, Marsden was appointed Director of Policy at the British Union for the Abolition of Vivisection and between 2008 and 2010 was the CEO of the Painting and Decorating Association.

In January 2011, it was reported that Marsden had commenced legal enquiries into allegations of hacking into his phone back in 2003. A suspended reporter who worked at the Sunday Mirror and then the News of the World was claimed to be involved.

Parliament of the United Kingdom
Preceded by Derek Conway	Member of Parliament for Shrewsbury and Atcham; 1997–2005	Succeeded by Daniel Kawczynski
