= Majrowski v Guy's and St Thomas' NHS Trust =

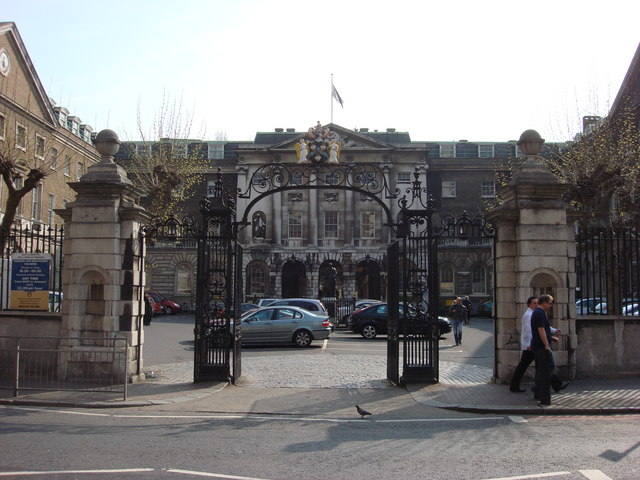
- Court: House of Lords
- Decided: 12 July 2006
- Citations: [2006] UKHL 34, [2006] ICR 1199

Court membership
- Judges sitting: Lord Nicholls of Birkenhead, Lord Hope of Craighead, Baroness Hale of Richmond, Lord Carswell and Lord Brown of Eaton-under-Heywood

Keywords
- Discrimination

Majrowski v Guy's and St Thomas' NHS Trust [2006] UKHL 34 is a UK labour law case holding that an employer will be vicariously liable for the harassment of an employee by another.

== Facts ==
Mr William Majrowski was a gay man, and worked as a clinical auditor co-ordinator. He claimed that his manager, Sandra Freeman bullied and harassed him, in breach of section 1 of the Protection from Harassment Act 1997. He said this made the employer vicariously liable. The judge held there was no cause of action because section 3 created no statutory tort for which an employer could be vicariously liable.

== Judgment ==
The House of Lords held that there was a new statutory tort for harassment in the Protection from Harassment Act 1997, and it made employers vicariously liable. It was not solely about stalking. This was supported by section 10(1) concerning Scotland. Lord Nicholls emphasised the overlap with European Directives’ common definition of harassment, meaning unwanted conduct violating the dignity of a person. He said the following.

9. Whatever its historical origin, this common law principle of strict liability for another person's wrongs finds its rationale today in a combination of policy factors. They are summarised in Professor Fleming's Law of Torts, 9th ed, (1998) pages 409-410. Stated shortly, these factors are that all forms of economic activity carry a risk of harm to others, and fairness requires that those responsible for such activities should be liable to persons suffering loss from wrongs committed in the conduct of the enterprise. This is 'fair', because it means injured persons can look for recompense to a source better placed financially than individual wrongdoing employees. It means also that the financial loss arising from the wrongs can be spread more widely, by liability insurance and higher prices. In addition, and importantly, imposing strict liability on employers encourages them to maintain standards of 'good practice' by their employees. For these reasons employers are to be held liable for wrongs committed by their employees in the course of their employment.

10. With these policy considerations in mind, it is difficult to see a coherent basis for confining the common law principle of vicarious liability to common law wrongs. The rationale underlying the principle holds good for equitable wrongs. The rationale also holds good for a wrong comprising a breach of a statutory duty or prohibition which gives rise to civil liability, provided always the statute does not expressly or impliedly indicate otherwise. A precondition of vicarious liability is that the wrong must be committed by an employee in the course of his employment. A wrong is committed in the course of employment only if the conduct is so closely connected with acts the employee is authorised to do that, for the purposes of the liability of the employer to third parties, the wrongful conduct may fairly and properly be regarded as done by the employee while acting in the course of his employment: see Lister v Hesley Hall Ltd [2002] 1 AC 215, 245, para 69, per Lord Millett, and Dubai Aluminium Co Ltd v Salaam [2002] UKHL 48, [2003] 2 AC 366, 377, para 23. If this prerequisite is satisfied the policy reasons underlying the common law principle are as much applicable to equitable wrongs and breaches of statutory obligations as they are to common law torts.

[...]

24. [...] Neither the terms nor the practical effect of this legislation indicate that Parliament intended to exclude the ordinary principle of vicarious liability.

25. As to the terms of the legislation, by section 3 Parliament created a new cause of action, a new civil wrong. Damages are one of the remedies for this wrong, although they are not the primary remedy. Parliament has spelled out some particular features of this new wrong: anxiety is a head of damage, the limitation period is six years, and so on. These features do not in themselves indicate an intention to exclude vicarious liability. Vicarious liability arises only if the new wrong is committed by an employee in the course of his employment, as already described. The acts of the employee must meet the 'close connection' test. If an employee's acts of harassment meet this test, I am at a loss to see why these particular features of this newly created wrong should be thought to place this wrong in a special category in which an employer is exempt from vicarious liability. It is true that this new wrong usually comprises conduct of an intensely personal character between two individuals. But this feature may also be present with other wrongs which attract vicarious liability, such as assault.

26. Nor does imposition of criminal liability only on the perpetrator of the wrong, and on a person who aids, abets, counsels or procures the harassing conduct, point to a different conclusion. Conversion, assault and battery may attract criminal liability as well as civil liability, but this does not exclude vicarious liability.

27. I turn to the practical effect of the legislation. Vicarious liability for an employee's harassment of another person, whether a fellow employee or not, will to some extent increase employers' burdens. That is clear. But, here again, this does not suffice to show Parliament intended to exclude the ordinary common law principle of vicarious liability. Parliament added harassment to the list of civil wrongs. Parliament did so because it considered the existing law provided insufficient protection for victims of harassment. The inevitable consequence of Parliament creating this new wrong of universal application is that at times an employee will commit this wrong in the course of his employment. This prompts the question: why should an employer have a special dispensation in respect of the newly-created wrong and not be liable if an employee commits this wrong in the course of his employment? The contemporary rationale of employers' vicarious liability is as applicable to this new wrong as it is to common law torts.

28. Take a case where an employee, in the course of his employment, harasses a non-employee, such as a customer of the employer. In such a case the employer would be liable if his employee had assaulted the customer. Why should this not equally be so in respect of harassment? In principle, harassment arising from a dispute between two employees stands on the same footing. If, acting in the course of his employment, one employee assaults another, the employer is liable. Why should harassment be treated differently?

29. As I see it, the matter of most concern to employers is the prospect of abuse in cases of alleged workplace harassment. Employers fear the prospect of a multiplicity of unfounded, speculative claims if they are vicariously liable for employees' harassment. Disgruntled employees or ex-employees, perhaps suffering from stress at work unrelated to harassment, perhaps bitter at being dismissed, will all too readily advance unmeritorious claims for compensation for harassment. Internal grievance procedures will not always satisfy an employee who is nursing a grievance. Although awards of damages for anxiety under the 1997 Act will normally be modest, a claimant may well pursue his present or erstwhile employer, not the alleged wrongdoer himself. The claim may be put forward for the first time years after the alleged harassment is said to have occurred. The alleged perpetrator may no longer be with the employer and may not be traceable.

30. This is a real and understandable concern. But these difficulties, and the prospect of abuse, are not sufficient reasons for excluding vicarious liability. To exclude liability on these grounds would be, to use the hackneyed phrase, to throw the baby out with the bathwater. It would mean that where serious harassment by an employee in the course of his employment has occurred, the victim - who may not be a fellow employee - would not have the right normally provided by the law to persons who suffer a wrong in that circumstance, namely, the right to have recourse to the wrongdoer's employer. The possibility of abuse is not a good reason for denying that right. Courts are well able to separate the wheat from the chaff at an early stage of the proceedings. They should be astute to do so. In most cases courts should have little difficulty in applying the 'close connection' test. Where the claim meets that requirement, and the quality of the conduct said to constitute harassment is being examined, courts will have in mind that irritations, annoyances, even a measure of upset, arise at times in everybody's day-to-day dealings with other people. Courts are well able to recognise the boundary between conduct which is unattractive, even unreasonable, and conduct which is oppressive and unacceptable. To cross the boundary from the regrettable to the unacceptable the gravity of the misconduct must be of an order which would sustain criminal liability under section 2.

The overlap with the EC discrimination legislation

31. I turn next to a difficult part of the case. The Trust placed reliance on the overlap which exists between the harassment provisions in the 1997 Act and the harassment provisions in the series of non-discrimination regulations introduced to give effect to Directives 2000/43/EC, 2000/78/EC and 2002/73/EC.... The directives established a common framework for tackling discrimination on six specific grounds: sex, race, disability, sexual orientation, religion or belief, and age.

32. One example of the overlap will suffice. On the relevant point the several regulations are substantially to the same effect. The Race Relations Act 1976 (Amendment)) Regulations 2003 (SI 2003/1626) inserted into the Race Relations Act 1976 new provisions regarding harassment. The effect of section 4(2A), read with section 3A, is that it is unlawful for an employer to subject an employee to harassment on the grounds of race or ethnic or national origins. Harassment means, in short, engaging in unwanted conduct which has the purpose or effect of violating another person's dignity or creating an intimidating, hostile, degrading, humiliating or offensive environment for another person. Section 32, which was part of the statute as originally enacted in 1976, provides that anything done by a person in the course of his employment shall be treated as done by his employer as well as by him, subject to the 'employer's defence', as it is known colloquially. The employer's defence is that in proceedings brought against an employer in respect of an act alleged to have been done by an employee the employer has a defence where he can prove he took such steps as were reasonably practicable steps to prevent the employee from doing that act or acts of that description: section 32(3). The Trust contrasted the availability of this defence in proceedings brought under the Race Relations Act 1976 with the position under the 1997 Act if an employer is strictly liable under the 1997 Act for harassment committed by his employees in the course of their employment. The contrast means that if an employer's liability under the 1997 Act is strict, victims of racial harassment can in some circumstances bypass the defence intended to be available to employers under the amendments made to the Race Relations Act 1976. Victims can do so by taking the simple step of bringing their harassment claims under the 1997 Act. By this means victims can also bypass the strict time limits applicable to discrimination claims.

33. Had the amending regulations of 2003 been made before the 1997 Act was enacted this would have been a telling point. But they were not. In short the historical explanation of how it comes about that the employer's defence is available in harassment claims brought under the Race Relations Act 1976 is as follows.

[...]

37. The legislative history regarding harassment on grounds of sex or disability is essentially similar. Amendments were made by regulations to the existing discrimination legislation: the Sex Discrimination Act 1975 and the Disability Discrimination Act 1995. Both those statutes already included provision for the employer's defence in respect of discrimination claims. There was no discrimination legislation already in existence regarding sexual orientation, religion or belief, or age. In these cases corresponding provision was made by regulations which have to stand on their own feet.

38. Given this history, the existence of the employer's defence in the discrimination legislation, embracing harassment as it now does pursuant to the requirements of the directives, and the absence of such a defence from the (earlier) 1997 Act, does not assist materially in the interpretation of the 1997 Act. The discrimination legislation, as it existed in 1997, is too removed from harassment for the inclusion of the employer's defence in that legislation to throw any light on the interpretation of the 1997 Act. The accretion of harassment to the discrimination legislation derives from the directives and came later.

39. Although these later amendments to the discrimination legislation do not assist in the interpretation of the 1997 Act, it must be acknowledged that in the fields they cover they have produced a discordant and unsatisfactory overlap with the 1997 Act.

Lord Hope, Lady Hale, Lord Carswell and Lord Brown gave concurring opinions.

== See also ==
- UK labour law
- UK employment equality law
- Workplace harassment
