= British Polish Chamber of Commerce =

In June 1989, as Poland turned away from communism, a group of British-Polish students and graduates, Polish expats and British businessmen, established Interes, an organisation promoting business, trade and investment between Britain and Poland.

Under the chairmanship of Leszek Jakubowski who took over from Barbara Stachowiak in 1993, Interes and the Polish Enterprise Centre were transformed into the British Polish Chamber of Commerce (BPCC), a non-profit organization incorporated in the UK in 1995 as a company limited by guarantee, with Juliusz Bogacki as its chief executive. In 1997 the BPCC moved to the Ognisko Polskie on Exhibition Road, where it continued to promote bilateral trade and investment between Britain and Poland, running conferences, workshops, trade missions, business clinics and its regular monthly Open Forum meetings, as well as publish 'Eagle Eye', the Chamber magazine.

In 1998/9 the British Polish Chamber of Commerce (BPCC) amalgamated with its sister organisation the British Chamber of Commerce in Poland (BCCP) to form one bilateral organisation.

The British Chamber of Commerce in Poland (BCCP) was established in 1992 as a non-profit organization incorporated in the UK as a company limited by guarantee. Its original role was to support British companies investing in the Polish market, shortly after the country's economic transformation. In 2001, the Chamber changed its name and its statute to become a bilateral chamber, supporting two-way trade and investment relations between the United Kingdom and Poland.

The Chamber's regular events in Poland include business mixers, conferences, seminars and workshops aimed at the international business community and at Polish exporters interested in the UK market. Shortly before Poland joined the EU on 1 May 2004, the BPCC began holding regular events in London, looking at various aspects of doing business in Poland. After Poland's EU Accession, the BPCC began organising regular recruitment fairs, matching UK companies and employment agencies with Polish workers seeking to work in the UK. These have been held around Poland and in London. Since February 2007, the BPCC has been holding events in London, the Midlands, the North and Scotland aimed at Polish entrepreneurs that have set up businesses in the UK.

Since July 2013, the Chamber has been engaged on a joint project with UK Trade and Investment as part of the UK Government's Overseas Business Network initiative to support UK exporters. A separate team was recruited to identify Polish importers, distributors, wholesalers and agents and match them with potential UK exporters.

Since October 2014, the Chamber has mirrored the trade project to offer similar support to Polish exporters, identifying for them UK importers, distributors, wholesalers and agents, matched to a Sourcing From Poland service for UK importers.

== Officers ==
The present chief executive officer is Paweł Siwecki, who replaced Joe Tunney in December 2012. Martin Oxley was the chamber's CEO from 2005 to 2011, when he left the Chamber to head up the UKTI team at the British embassy in Warsaw. Before Oxley became CEO, day-to-day running of the chamber was the responsibility of Executive Director Barbara Stachowiak-Kowalska MBE (from 1993 to 2005).

Antoni F. Reczek, president of PwC Polska, replaced Alan Jarman as chairman of the board in June 2012.

== Recent activities and achievements ==
The British Polish Chamber of Commerce has been awarded 'best British chamber in continental Europe' for four years in a row (2008, 2007, 2006 and 2005) by COBCOE, the Council of British Chambers of Commerce in Continental Europe. The BPCC was runner-up for this award in 2004 and 2003.

For three years in a row, the BPCC has been awarded the best British chamber for trade development (2014, 2015 and 2016), recognising its preeminent position as a UKTI/DIT Overseas Delivery Partner.

Since August 2014, the BPCC has been an accredited chamber within the British Chambers of Commerce, the second British chamber outside the UK to win accreditation. In April 2015, the BPCC was also accredited by COBCOE.
