= Stalking =

Unwanted observation

A U.S. government video about stalking

Stalking is unwanted or repeated surveillance or contact by an individual or group toward another person. Stalking behaviors are interrelated to harassment and intimidation and may include following the victim in person or monitoring them. The term stalking is used with some differing definitions in psychiatry and psychology, as well as in some legal jurisdictions as a term for a criminal offense.

Although interrelated, stalking is distinct from harassment, as it involves repeated behaviours and contact. Some scholars have suggested that the moral wrong of stalking is not well defined and propose that stalking is an attempt to force a personal connection and relationship on a victim. According to a 2002 report by the U.S. National Center for Victims of Crime, "virtually any unwanted contact between two people that directly or indirectly communicates a threat or places the victim in fear can be considered stalking", although the rights afforded to victims may vary depending on jurisdiction.

== Definitions ==
A 1995 research paper titled "Stalking Strangers and Lovers" was among the first places to use the term "stalking" to describe the common occurrence of males after a breakup who aggressively pursue their female former partner. Prior to that paper instead of the term "stalking", people more commonly used the terms "female harassment", "obsessive following" or "psychological rape".

The difficulties associated with defining this term exactly (or defining it at all) are well documented. This is due in part to overlapping between accepted courtship behaviors and stalking behaviors. Context must be relied on to determine if a specific action is a stalking behavior.

Having been used since at least the 16th century to refer to a prowler or a poacher, the term stalker was initially used by media in the 20th century to describe people who pester and harass others, initially with specific reference to the harassment of celebrities by strangers who were described as being "obsessed". This use of the word appears to have been coined by the tabloid press in the United States. With time, the meaning of stalking changed and incorporated individuals being harassed by their former partners. Pathé and Mullen describe stalking as "a constellation of behaviours in which an individual inflicts upon another repeated unwanted intrusions and communications". Stalking can be defined as the willful and repeated following, watching or harassing of another person. Unlike other crimes, which usually involve one act, stalking is a series of actions that occur over a period of time.

Although stalking is illegal in most areas of the world, some actions that contribute to stalking may be legal, such as gathering information, calling someone on the phone, texting, sending gifts, emailing, or instant messaging. They become illegal when they breach the legal definition of harassment (e.g., an action such as sending a text is not usually illegal, but is illegal when frequently repeated to an unwilling recipient). In fact, United Kingdom law states the incident only has to happen twice when the harasser should be aware their behavior is unacceptable (e.g., two phone calls to a stranger, two gifts, following the victim then phoning them, etc.).

Cultural norms and meaning affect the way stalking is defined. Scholars note that the majority of men and women admit engaging in various stalking-like behaviors following a breakup, but stop such behaviors over time, suggesting that "engagement in low levels of unwanted pursuit behaviors for a relatively short amount of time, particularly in the context of a relationship break-up, may be normative for heterosexual dating relationships occurring within U.S. culture."

== Psychology and behaviors ==
People characterized as stalkers may be accused of having a mistaken belief that another person loves them (erotomania), or that they need rescuing. Stalking can consist of an accumulation of a series of actions which, by themselves, can be legal, such as calling on the phone, sending gifts, or sending emails.

Stalkers may use overt and covert intimidation, threats and violence to frighten their victims. They may engage in vandalism and property damage or make physical attacks that are meant to frighten. Less common are sexual assaults.

Intimate-partner stalkers are the most dangerous type. In the UK, for example, most stalkers are former partners, and evidence indicates that stalking facilitated by mental illness (often covered by the media) accounts for only a minority of cases of alleged stalking. A UK Home Office research study on the use of the Protection from Harassment Act stated: "The study found that the Protection from Harassment Act is being used to deal with a variety of behaviour such as domestic and inter-neighbour disputes. It is rarely used for stalking as portrayed by the media since only a small minority of cases in the survey involved such behaviour."

Some scholars have proposed that stalkers have an insecure attachment style and that this can contribute to the development of borderline and narcissistic personality characteristics, which has been observed in people whose stalking leads to criminal justice system involvement. Such people rely on getting positive approval from others in order to maintain their positive self concept. If they don't get this, they may develop maladaptive coping strategies, such as stalking and a significant amount of data supports this theory.

An alternative theory is that stalking behaviours can result from social factors that are learnt. As such, people that stalk may be more likely to know people who stalk or that show approval of such behaviour. Antisocial peers and attitudes are prominent factors linked to broader criminal offending behaviour. A test of this involving US college students found that social learning factors were associated with self-reported stalking perpetration.

Other theories in terms of stalking include evolutionary theory, that someone somehow believes such behaviour is necessary to thrive and survive and multi-factor theories, such as behavioural theories, where it is proposed that stalking repeats and escalates if the behaviour is rewarded. For example, stalking may provide feelings of power or control, which could be perceived by the individual as rewarding. There is also evidence to support that stalking is an extension of coercive control and is more likely if there was controlling behaviour or intimidation during the prior relationship.

=== Psychological effects on victims ===
91.5% of stalking victims experience a psychological impact from this behaviour. A review of existing literature in 2023, found that across a range of studies, some prominent psychological impacts included fear of death, anxiety and intrusive thoughts and memories. Less commonly found psychological impacts included panic attacks, post traumatic stress disorder and depression. 24% of victims had considered or attempted suicide. The psychological impact of stalking on victims is extensive and significant. Other research conducted in Europe has found that stalking victims commonly experience psychological distress, post traumatic stress disorder and trauma related symptoms. Anger, annoyance and fear were commonly experienced emotions in response to stalking.

Disruptions in daily life necessary to escape the stalker, including changes in employment, residence and phone numbers, take a toll on the victim's well-being and may lead to a sense of isolation. Research has shown that 97.4% of stalking victims took coping measures. Coping strategies mainly consisted of making minor changes to make it more difficult for the stalker to persist. More serious measures, like moving home, typically only occurred in very serious cases of stalking.

According to Lamber Royakkers:

Stalking is a form of mental assault, in which the perpetrator repeatedly, unwantedly, and disruptively breaks into the life-world of the victim, with whom they have no relationship (or no longer have). Moreover, the separated acts that make up the intrusion cannot by themselves cause the mental abuse, but do taken together (cumulative effect).

=== Stalking as a close relationship ===
Stalking has also been described as a form of close relationship between the parties, albeit a disjunctive one where the two participants have opposing goals rather than cooperative goals. One participant, often a woman, likely wishes to end the relationship entirely, but may find herself unable to easily do so. The other participant, often but not always a man, wishes to escalate the relationship. It has been described as a close relationship because the duration, frequency, and intensity of contact may rival that of a more traditional conjunctive dating relationship.

=== Types of victims ===
Based on work with stalking victims for eight years in Australia, Mullen and Pathé identified different types of stalking victims, characterized by prior relationship with the stalker. These are:

- Prior intimates: Victims who had been in a previous intimate relationship with their stalker. In the article, Mullen and Pathé describe this as being "the largest category, the most common victim profile being a woman who has previously shared an intimate relationship with her (usually) male stalker." These victims are more likely to be exposed to violence being enacted by their stalker especially if the stalker had a criminal past. In addition, victims who have "date stalkers" are less likely to experience violence by their stalkers. A "date stalker" is considered an individual who had an intimate relationship with the victim but it was short-lived instead of a long term relationship.
- Casual acquaintances and friends: Among male stalking victims, most are part of this category. This category of victims also includes neighbor stalking. This may result in the victims' change of residence.
- Professional contacts: These are victims who have been stalked by patients, clients, or students who they have had a professional relationship with. Certain professions such as health care providers, teachers, and lawyers are at a higher risk for stalking.
- Workplace contacts: The stalkers of these victims tend to visit them in their workplace which means that they are either an employer, employee, or a customer. When victims have stalkers coming to their workplace, this poses a threat not only to the victims' safety but to the safety of other individuals as well.
- Strangers: These victims are typically unaware of how their stalkers began stalking because typically these stalkers form a sense of admiration for their victims from a distance.
- The famous: Most of these victims are individuals who are portrayed heavily on media outlets but can also include individuals such as politicians and athletes.

=== Gender ===
Although stalking is a gender-neutral behavior, studies confirm that the majority of victims are female and that the primary perpetrators are male. As for the victims, a January 2009 report from the United States Department of Justice reported the rate of stalking victimization for female was approximately 2% and for male was approximately 0.7%. As for the perpetrators, many studies have shown that approximately 80-90% of stalking perpetrators are male.

According to one study, women often target other women, whereas men primarily stalk women. A January 2009 report from the United States Department of Justice also reports that "Males were as likely to report being stalked by a male as by a female offender. 43% of male stalking victims stated that the offender was female, while 41% of male victims stated that the offender was another male. Female victims of stalking were significantly more likely to be stalked by a male (67%) rather than a female (24%) offender." This report provides considerable data by gender and race about both stalking and harassment, obtained via the 2006 Supplemental Victimization Survey (SVS), by the U.S. Census Bureau for the U.S. Department of Justice.

In an article in the journal Sex Roles, Jennifer Langhinrichsen-Rohling discusses how gender plays a role in the difference between stalkers and victims. She says, "gender is associated with the types of emotional reactions that are experienced by recipients of stalking related events, including the degree of fear experienced by the victim." In addition, she hypothesizes that gender may also affect how police handle a case of stalking, how the victim copes with the situation, and how the stalker might view their behavior. She discusses how victims might view certain forms of stalking as normal because of gender socialization influences on the acceptability of certain behaviors. She emphasizes that in the United Kingdom, Australia, and the United States, strangers are considered more dangerous when it comes to stalking than a former partner. Media also plays an important role due to portrayals of male stalking behavior as acceptable, influencing men into thinking it is normal. Since gender roles are socially constructed, sometimes men do not report stalking. She also mentions coercive control theory; "future research will be needed to determine if this theory can predict how changes in social structures and gender-specific norms will result in variations in rates of stalking for men versus women over time in the United States and across the world."

=== Types of stalkers ===
Psychologists often group individuals who stalk into two categories: psychotic and nonpsychotic. Some stalkers may have pre-existing psychotic disorders such as delusional disorder, schizoaffective disorder, or schizophrenia. However, most stalkers are nonpsychotic and may exhibit disorders or neuroses such as major depression, adjustment disorder, or substance dependence, as well as a variety of personality disorders (such as antisocial, borderline, or narcissistic). The nonpsychotic stalkers' pursuit of victims is primarily angry, vindictive, focused, often including projection of blame, obsession, dependency, minimization, denial, and jealousy. Conversely, only 10% of stalkers had an erotomanic delusional disorder.

In "A Study of Stalkers" Mullen et al. (2000) identified five types of stalkers:

- Rejected stalkers follow their victims in order to reverse, correct, or avenge a rejection (e.g. divorce, separation, termination).
- Resentful stalkers make a vendetta because of a sense of grievance against the victims – motivated mainly by the desire to frighten and distress the victim.
- Intimacy seekers seek to establish an intimate, loving relationship with their victim. Such stalkers form a spectrum from those with erotomania, to those who do not believe their love is reciprocated but who insist with "delusional intensity" of their eventual success, and to other rigid, obsessive individuals.
- Incompetent suitors, despite poor social or courting skills, have a fixation, or in some cases, a sense of entitlement to an intimate relationship with those who have attracted their amorous interest. Their victims are most often already in a dating relationship with someone else.
- Predatory stalkers spy on the victim in order to prepare and plan an attack – often sexual – on the victim.

In addition to Mullen et al., Joseph A. Davis, Ph.D., an American researcher, crime analyst, and university psychology professor at San Diego State University investigated, as a member of the Stalking Case Assessment Team (SCAT), special unit within the San Diego District Attorney's Office, hundreds of cases involving what he called and typed "terrestrial" and "cyberstalking" between 1995 and 2002. This research culminated in one of the most comprehensive books written to date on the subject. Published by CRC Press, Inc. in August 2001, it is considered the "gold standard" as a reference to stalking crimes, victim protection, safety planning, security and threat assessment.

The 2002 National Victim Association Academy defines an additional form of stalking: The vengeance/terrorist stalker. Both the vengeance stalker and terrorist stalker (the latter sometimes called the political stalker) do not, in contrast with some of the aforementioned types of stalkers, seek a personal relationship with their victims but rather force them to emit a certain response. While the vengeance stalker's motive is "to get even" with the other person whom he/she perceives has done some wrong to them (e.g., an employee who believes is fired without justification from a job by a superior), the political stalker intends to accomplish a political agenda, also using threats and intimidation to force the target to refrain or become involved in some particular activity regardless of the victim's consent. For example, most prosecutions in this stalking category have been against anti-abortionists who stalk doctors in an attempt to discourage the performance of abortions.

Stalkers may fit categories with paranoia disorders. Intimacy-seeking stalkers often have delusional disorders involving erotomanic delusions. With rejected stalkers, the continual clinging to a relationship of an inadequate or dependent person couples with the entitlement of the narcissistic personality, and the persistent jealousy of the paranoid personality. In contrast, resentful stalkers demonstrate an almost "pure culture of persecution", with delusional disorders of the paranoid type, paranoid personalities, and paranoid schizophrenia.

One of the uncertainties in understanding the origins of stalking is that the concept is now widely understood in terms of specific behaviors which are found to be offensive or illegal. As discussed above, these specific (apparently stalking) behaviors may have multiple motivations.

Research conducted in 2023, has shown that some stalkers make vexatious complaints about victims, as part of their course of stalking conduct, causing the victim of stalking to be investigated.

In addition, the personality characteristics that are often discussed as antecedent to stalking may also produce behavior that is not conventionally defined as stalking. People who complain obsessively and for years, about a perceived wrong or wrong-doer, when no one else can perceive the injury—and people who cannot or will not "let go" of a person or a place or an idea—comprise a wider group of persons that may be problematic in ways that seem similar to stalking. Some of these people get excluded from their organizations—they may get hospitalized or fired or let go if their behavior is defined in terms of illegal stalking, but many others do good or even excellent work in their organizations and appear to have just one focus of tenacious obsession.

=== Cyberstalking ===
Cyberstalking is the use of computers or other electronic technology to facilitate stalking. In Davis (2001), Lucks identified a separate category of stalkers who instead of a terrestrial means, prefer to perpetrate crimes against their targeted victims through electronic and online means. Amongst college students, Ménard and Pincus found that male stalkers were likely to have a high score of sexual abuse as children and narcissistic vulnerability.

Men were more likely to become stalkers. Out of the women who participated in their study, 9% were cyberstalkers meanwhile only 4% were overt stalkers. In addition, the male participants revealed the opposite, 16% were overt stalkers while 11% were cyberstalkers. Alcohol and physical abuse both played a role in predicting women's cyberstalking and in men, "preoccupied attachment significantly predicted cyber stalking" while the victims were likely to have an "avoidant attachment".

=== Stalking by groups ===
According to a U.S. Department of Justice special report, a significant number of people reporting stalking incidents claim that they had been stalked by more than one person, with 18.2% reporting that they were stalked by two people and 13.1% reporting that they had been stalked by three or more. The report did not break down these cases into numbers of victims who claimed to have been stalked by several people individually, and by people acting in concert. A question asked of respondents reporting three or more stalkers by polling personnel about whether the stalking was related to co-workers, members of a gang, fraternities, sororities, etc., did not have its responses indicated in the survey results as released by the DOJ. The data for this report was obtained via the 2006 Supplemental Victimization Survey (SVS), conducted by the U.S. Census Bureau for the Department of Justice.

According to a survey in the United Kingdom, 5% of stalking cases involved more than one stalker and 40% of the victims said that friends or family of their stalker had also been involved. In 15% of cases, the victim was unaware of any reason for the harassment.

Over a quarter of all stalking and harassment victims do not know their stalkers in any capacity. About a tenth responding to the SVS did not know the identities of their stalkers. 11% of victims said they had been stalked for five years or more.

=== False claims of stalking, "gang stalking" and delusions of persecution ===
In 1999, Pathe, Mullen and Purcell wrote that popular interest in stalking was promoting false claims. In 2004, Sheridan and Blaauw conducted research involving 357 participants. They found that 11.5% of reported claims of stalking were false. Of those, 70% were made by people experiencing delusions. This research was conducted in the Netherlands and UK. Another study estimated the proportion of false reports that were due to delusions as 64%.

Gang stalking or group-stalking is a set of persecutory delusions in which those affected believe they are being followed, stalked, and harassed by a large number of people. The term is associated with the virtual community formed by people who consider themselves "targeted individuals" ("T.I."), claiming their lives are disrupted from being stalked by organized groups intent on causing them harm.

A 2020 study by Sheridan et al. gave figures for lifetime prevalence of perceived gang-stalking at 0.66% for adult women and 0.17% for adult men.

== Prevalence and demographics ==
=== Australia ===
According to a study conducted by Purcell, Pathé and Mullen (2002), 23% of the Australian population reported having been stalked.

=== Austria ===
Stieger, Burger and Schild conducted a survey in Austria, revealing a lifetime prevalence of 11% (women: 17%, men: 3%). Further results include: 86% of stalking victims were female, 81% of the stalkers were male. Women were mainly stalked by men (88%) while men were almost equally stalked by men and women (60% male stalkers). 19% of the stalking victims reported that they were still being stalked at the time of study participation (point prevalence rate: 2%). To 70% of the victims, the stalker was known, being a prior intimate partner in 40%, a friend or acquaintance in 23% and a colleague at work in 13% of cases. As a consequence, 72% of the victims reported having changed their lifestyle. 52% of former and ongoing stalking victims reported having a currently impaired (pathological) psychological well-being. There was no significant difference between the incidence of stalking in rural and urban areas.

=== England and Wales ===
According to data covering the year to end of March 2024, 20.2% of women aged 16 and over have experienced stalking at some point in their lives, compared to 8.7% of men. 28% were experiencing domestic stalking, with 21% stalked by a partner or ex-partner. 9% of stalking victims said they were being stalked by family members. In 42% of cases, online methods using electronic communications were used as part of the stalking methods. The Crime Survey for England and Wales, for year ending March 2025, showed that 2.9% (1.4 million) of people aged 16 and over had experienced stalking in the past year. Younger people are more likely to be victims.

The Fixated Threat Assessment Centre, a unit established to deal with people with fixations on public figures, 86% of a sample group of 100 people assessed by them appeared to them to have a psychotic illness; 57% of the sample group were subsequently admitted to hospital, and 26% treated in the community. A similar retrospective study published in 2009 in Psychological Medicine, based on a sample of threats to the royal family kept by the Metropolitan Police Service over a period of 15 years, suggested that 83.6% of these letter-writers had a serious mental illness.

=== Germany ===
Dressing, Kuehner and Gass conducted a representative survey in Mannheim, a middle-sized German city, and reported a lifetime prevalence of having been stalked of almost 12%.

=== India ===
In India, a stalking case is reported every 55 minutes. Most cases are not reported as they are not considered criminal enough.

=== United States ===
Tjaden and Thoennes reported a lifetime prevalence (being stalked) of 8% in females and 2% in males (depending on how strict the definition) in the National Violence Against Women Survey.

== Laws on harassment and stalking ==
=== Australia ===
Every Australian state enacted laws prohibiting stalking during the 1990s, with Queensland being the first state to do so in 1994. The laws vary slightly from state to state, with Queensland's laws having the broadest scope, and South Australian laws the most restrictive. Punishments vary from a maximum of 10 years imprisonment in some states, to a fine for the lowest severity of stalking in others. Australian anti-stalking laws have some notable features. Unlike many US jurisdictions they do not require the victim to have felt fear or distress as a result of the behaviour, only that a reasonable person would have felt this way. In some states, the anti-stalking laws operate extra-territorially, meaning that an individual can be charged with stalking if either they or the victim are in the relevant state. Most Australian states provide the option of a restraining order in cases of stalking, breach of which is punishable as a criminal offence. There has been relatively little research into Australian court outcomes in stalking cases, although Freckelton (2001) found that in the state of Victoria, most stalkers received fines or community based dispositions.

=== Canada ===
Section 264 of the Criminal Code, titled "criminal harassment", addresses acts which are termed "stalking" in many other jurisdictions. The provisions of the section came into force in August 1993 with the intent of further strengthening laws protecting women. It is a hybrid offence, which may be punishable upon summary conviction or as an indictable offence, the latter of which may carry a prison term of up to ten years. Section 264 has withstood Charter challenges.

The Chief, Policing Services Program, for Statistics Canada has stated:

... of the 10,756 incidents of criminal harassment reported to police in 2006, 1,429 of these involved more than one accused.

=== China ===
In China, simple stalking was treated as a kind of minor offence when it amounted to harassment, so stalkers were usually punished by a small fine or less than 10 days detention under the Public Security Administration Punishment Law.

According to the Tort Liability Law, infringement of citizens' privacy shall be subject to tort liability. For stalkers to spy on, secretly photograph, eavesdrop on or spread the privacy of others, under Article 42 of the Public Security Administration Punishment Law clearly stipulates that they can be detained for not more than five days or fined not more than five hundred yuan, and if the circumstances are more serious, they can be detained for not less than five days and not more than ten days, and can be fined not more than five hundred yuan.

Unfortunately, under the current judicial system in mainland China, there is a lack of judicial protection for individuals facing illegal stalking, harassment, surveillance, and other stalking behaviors. Even celebrities may not be able to solve it for a long time when faced with stalking of illegitimate meals. Many cases across China have shown that ordinary people who have been stalked may still be unable to solve the problem after they seek help from the judicial authorities. In the case of Wuhu, Anhui in March 2018, the entangled woman repeatedly rescued the police to no avail and was eventually killed. In the homicide case in Laiyuan, Hebei in July of the same year, women and their families who had been stalked and harassed for a long time also helped the police repeatedly to no avail. It did not end until the opponent broke into the home with arms and was killed by victim's parents.

In the social culture of mainland China, the "stalker" type of courtship is highly respected, that is, as the saying goes, "good women (martyrs) are afraid of stalkers". Literary works also publicly promote such behaviors, and stalking between opposite sexes is thus beautified as courtship. In real life, this type of behavior may even occur when the two parties do not know each other and the stalked person does not know in advance. Through online platforms and other social media, with the help of the convenience of online communication, individuals and institutions directly participate in, promote, and support various "courtship-style" tracing and stalking cases.

=== France ===
Article 222–33–2 of the French Criminal Code (added in 2002) penalizes "Moral harassment," which is: "Harassing another person by repeated conduct which is designed to or leads to a deterioration of his conditions of work liable to harm his rights and his dignity, to damage his physical or mental health or compromise his career prospects," with a year's imprisonment and a fine of EUR15,000.

=== Germany ===
The German Criminal Code (§ 238 StGB) penalizes Nachstellung, defined as threatening or seeking proximity or remote contact with another person and thus heavily influencing their lives, with up to three years of imprisonment. The definition is not strict and allows "similar behaviour" to also be classified as stalking.

=== India ===
In 2013, Indian Parliament made amendments to the Indian Penal Code, introducing stalking as a criminal offence. Stalking has been defined as a man following or contacting a woman, despite clear indication of disinterest by the woman, or monitoring her use of the Internet or electronic communication. A man committing the offence of stalking would be liable for imprisonment up to three years for the first offence, and shall also be liable to fine and for any subsequent conviction would be liable for imprisonment up to five years and with fine.

=== Italy ===
Following a series of high-profile incidents that came to public attention, a law was proposed in June 2008 which became effective in February 2009 (D.L. 23.02.2009 n. 11) making a criminal offence under the newly introduced art. 612 bis of the penal code, punishable with imprisonment ranging from six months up to five years, any "continuative harassing, threatening or persecuting behaviour which: (1) causes a state of anxiety and fear in the victim(s), or; (2) ingenerates within the victim(s) a motivated fear for his/her own safety or for the safety of relatives, kins [sic], or others tied to the victim him/herself by an affective relationship, or; (3), forces the victim(s) to change his/her living habits." If the perpetrator of the offense is a subject tied to the victim by kinship or that is or has been in the past involved in a relationship with the victim (i.e., a current or former spouse or fiancé), or if the victim is a pregnant woman or a minor or a person with disabilities, the sanction can be elevated up to six years of incarceration.

=== Japan ===
In 2000, Japan enacted a national law to combat this behaviour, after the murder of Shiori Ino. Acts of stalking can be viewed as "interfering [with] the tranquility of others' lives" and are prohibited under petty offence laws.

However, stalking cases are increasing rather than decreasing, with more than 20,000 people reporting cases to the police in 2013, and civil society organisations estimate that these are only the tip of the iceberg; Japan has seen the highest growth in stalking cases in the world in recent years, and stalking has continued to turn into homicide. Many victims say that reporting to the police is ineffective, that the police treat it as a minor domestic dispute, that the process of filing a court order for protection can take months, and that some people have to hire private bodyguards.

=== Netherlands ===
In the Wetboek van Strafrecht, Article 285b defines the crime of belaging (harassment), which is a term used for stalking.

Article 285b:

1. One who unlawfully, systematically, and deliberately intrudes into someone's personal environment with the intention to force the other to act in a way, or to prevent one to act in a certain way or to induce fear, will be prosecuted for harassment, for which the maximal punishment is three years and a fine of the fourth monetary category.

2. The prosecution will only take place after a complaint of the person who is the victim of the crime.

=== Republic of Korea ===
Until 2021, simple stalking was treated as a kind of minor offence when it amounted to harassment, so stalkers were usually punished by a small fine or less than 30 days detention under the Minor Offences Act. In April 2021, the National Assembly passed an act intended to address widespread stalking crimes and protect victims, which came into force on October 21 the same year. The act includes a provision that mandates the victim must approve of punishment for the stalker. A subsequent bill proposes to remove this provision to address situations where the victim may fear retribution from the stalker.

South Korea's stalking laws were criticized for weaknesses and led to accusations the country does not treat violence against women seriously enough when a female subway worker in Seoul was stalked and stabbed to death in the subway restroom by her former colleague in September 2022. The stalker had been harassing the victim since 2019.

In October 2022, the city of Seoul announced the opening of three shelters to house stalking victims and offer free counseling.

=== Romania ===
Article 208 of the 2014 Criminal Code states:-

Article 208: Harassment

1. The act of someone who repeatedly follows, without right or a legitimate interest, a person or their home, workplace or other place frequented, thus causing a state of fear.
2. Making phone calls or communication by means of transmission, which by frequent or continuous use, causes fear to a person. This shall be punished with imprisonment from one to three months or a fine if the case is not a more serious offense.
3. Criminal action is initiated by prior complaint of the victim.

=== Russia ===
In the Criminal Code of the Russian Federation, such an independent corpus delicti as stalking is absent. However, lawyers argue that the persecution of a person in Russia can also be seriously fined. The victim of stalking only needs to use the articles that are already in the code. So, if the persecutor uses threats, then should refer to Article 119 of the Criminal Code of the Russian Federation "Threats of murder or causing grievous bodily harm". In this case, the offender is punished with compulsory labor for up to 480 hours or forced labor for up to 2 years. Also, the persecutor may face arrest for up to six months or imprisonment (restriction) of freedom for up to two years. "Violation of privacy" (Article 137 of the Criminal Code of the Russian Federation) can also be applied part of stalking. This crime manifests itself in the illegal collection of information about private life and its dissemination (including in public speeches and the media). For this, a criminal can receive a fine of up to 200 thousand rubles, go to compulsory work for up to 360 hours, and even be imprisoned for two years. In addition, persecutors often violate Article 138 of the Criminal Code of the Russian Federation Violation of the secrecy of correspondence, telephone conversations, postal, telegraph and other messages of citizens. The article provides for punishment ranging from a fine of 80 thousand rubles to correctional labor for up to one year.

However, these are not all articles of the Criminal Code that can be applied to stalkers. As result, I.A. Yurchenko, author of Crimes Against Information Security, claims that victims of persecution, in the presence of appropriate circumstances, have the right to use Article 133 of the Criminal Code of the Russian Federation "Compulsion to Sexual Actions" (from a fine of 120 thousand rubles to imprisonment for up to one year), article 139 of the Criminal Code of the Russian Federation "Violation of the inviolability of the home" (from a fine in the amount of 40 thousand rubles to imprisonment for two to three years), article 163 of the Criminal Code of the Russian Federation Extortion (imprisonment up to seven years), article 167 of the Criminal Code of the Russian Federation Intentional destruction or damage to property (up to imprisonment in accordance with the gravity of the offense).

Indeed, under the listed articles, many Russian stalkers were convicted. For example, a resident of Ufa, who forced his ex-girlfriend to resume relations by means of threats related to exposing her intimate photographs to the public, was found guilty under Articles 133 and 137 of the Criminal Code of the Russian Federation and sentenced to a fine of 70 thousand rubles. According to some lawyers, the punishment in such cases is not always commensurate with the crime committed, therefore they propose to include in the Criminal Code of Russia an article similar to § 238 of the Criminal Code of the Federal Republic of Germany, according to which a stalker pursuing a person faces up to 3 years in prison.

Also for its specific forms, one can be held criminally liable, for example: a threat to kill or cause grievous bodily harm (Article 119 of the Criminal Code of the Russian Federation); violation of privacy, that is, the illegal collection or dissemination of information about the private life of a person that constitutes his personal or family secret, without his consent (Article 137 of the Criminal Code of the Russian Federation); violation of the inviolability of the home (Article 139 of the Criminal Code of the Russian Federation). To do this, victim need to apply with a statement to law enforcement agencies. Crimes under Art. 137 and 139 of the Criminal Code of the Russian Federation are being investigated by investigators of the Investigative Committee of the Russian Federation, and criminal cases on the fact of threats are being considered by interrogators of the Ministry of Internal Affairs of the Russian Federation. Therefore, it is necessary to contact the relevant law enforcement agency at the scene of the crime (in this case, it is imperative to obtain a coupon-notification of the KUSP, confirming the fact of filing an application).

=== Taiwan ===
In Taiwan, more than 7,000 cases are reported each year, nearly half of which have been repeatedly harassed for up to a year and a quarter for up to three years, with 80% of the victims being female. A survey conducted by the Modern Women's Foundation in 2014 showed that less than 10% of those who had been harassed would report it or file a complaint, and 12.4% of young female students were found to have been stalked during the interview; the foundation therefore promoted the legislation of the "Stalking Prevention Act". However, the draft has not been reviewed since its first reviewing in the Legislative in 2015. In 2019, the DPP blocked the third reading of the bill on the grounds that it would "increase police duties." It was only in 2021 that the Stalking Prevention Act was again discussed and passed by the Legislative Yuan due to the murder of women. During the legislative process, the DPP insisted that the definition of stalking be limited to "related to sex or gender".

Under the Stalking and Harassment Prevention Act, anyone who conducts stalking and harassment may be sentenced to imprisonment of not more than one year or detention; in lieu thereof, or in addition thereto, a fine of not more than one hundred thousand New Taiwan Dollars may be imposed. Anyone who commits the crimes stated in the preceding paragraph with lethal weapons or other dangerous objects shall be sentenced to the imprisonment of not more than five years, or short-term imprisonment; in lieu thereof, or in addition thereto, a fine of not more than five hundred thousand New Taiwan Dollars may be imposed. Violators of a protection order issued by a court in accordance with Article 12, Paragraph 1, Subparagraphs 1 to 3 shall be sentenced to the imprisonment of not more than three years, or detention; in lieu thereof, or in addition thereto, a fine of not more than three hundred thousand New Taiwan Dollars may be imposed.

=== United Kingdom ===
Before the enactment of the Protection from Harassment Act 1997, the Telecommunications Act 1984 criminalised indecent, offensive or threatening phone calls, and the Malicious Communications Act 1988 criminalised the sending of an indecent, offensive or threatening letter, electronic communication, or other article to another person.

Before 1997, no specific offence of stalking existed in England and Wales. However, in Scotland, incidents could be dealt with under pre-existing law, with life imprisonment available for the worst offences.

==== England and Wales ====
In England and Wales, "harassment" was criminalised by the enactment of the Protection from Harassment Act 1997, which came into force on 16 June 1997. It makes it a criminal offence, punishable by up to six months' imprisonment, to make a course of conduct which amounts to harassment of another on two or more occasions. The court can also issue a restraining order, which carries a maximum punishment of five years' imprisonment if breached. In more serious cases of stalking, where it involves fear of violence or serious alarm and distress, the custodial sentence can be up to 10 years. In England and Wales, liability may arise if the victim suffers either mental or physical harm as a result of being harassed (or slang term stalked) (see R. v. Constanza).

In 2012, then-Prime Minister David Cameron stated that the government intended to make another attempt to create a law aimed specifically at stalking behaviour.

In May 2012, the Protection of Freedoms Act 2012 created the offence of stalking for the first time in England and Wales, by inserting these offences into the Protection from Harassment Act 1997. The act of stalking under this section is exemplified by contacting, or attempting to contact, a person by any means, publishing any statement or other material relating or purporting to relate to a person, monitoring the use by a person of the Internet, email, or any other form of electronic communication, loitering in any place (whether public or private), interfering with any property in the possession of a person, or watching or spying on a person.

The Protection of Freedoms Act 2012 also added Section 4(a) into the Protection From Harassment Act 1997 which covered 'Stalking involving fear of violence or serious alarm or distress'. This created the offence of where a person's conduct amounts to stalking and either causes another to fear (on at least two occasions) that violence will be used against them, or conduct that causes another person serious alarm or distress which has a substantial effect on their usual day-to-day activities.

==== Scotland ====
In Scotland, behaviour commonly described as stalking was already prosecuted as the common law offence of breach of the peace (not to be confused with the minor English offence of the same description) before the introduction of the statutory offence against s.39 of the Criminal Justice and Licensing (Scotland) Act 2010; either course can still be taken depending on the circumstances of each case. The statutory offence incurs a penalty of twelve months imprisonment or a fine upon summary conviction, or a maximum of five years' imprisonment or a fine upon conviction on indictment; penalties for conviction for breach of the peace are limited only by the sentencing powers of the court, thus a case remitted to the High Court can carry a sentence of imprisonment for life.

Provision is made under the Protection from Harassment Act against stalking to deal with the civil offence (i.e. the interference with the victim's personal rights), falling under the law of delict. Victims of stalking may sue for interdict against an alleged stalker, or a non-harassment order, breach of which is an offence.

=== United States ===
A 2021 public service announcement infographic video from the Centers for Disease Control and Prevention about stalking

California was the first state to criminalize stalking in the United States in 1990 as a result of numerous high-profile stalking cases in California, including the 1982 attempted murder of actress Theresa Saldana, the 1988 massacre by Richard Farley, the 1989 murder of actress Rebecca Schaeffer, and five Orange County stalking murders, also in 1989. The first anti-stalking law in the United States, California Penal Code Section 646.9, was developed and proposed by Municipal Court Judge John Watson of Orange County. Watson with U.S. Representative Ed Royce introduced the law in 1990. Also in 1990, the Los Angeles Police Department (LAPD) founded the United States' first Threat Management Unit, founded by LAPD Captain Robert Martin.

Within three years thereafter, every state in the United States followed suit to create the crime of stalking, under different names such as criminal harassment or criminal menace. The Driver's Privacy Protection Act (DPPA) was enacted in 1994 in response to numerous cases of a driver's information being abused for criminal activity, with prominent examples including the Saldana and Schaeffer stalking cases. The DPPA prohibits states from disclosing a driver's personal information without permission by State Department of Motor Vehicles (DMV).

The Violence Against Women Act of 2005, amending a United States statute, 108 Stat. 1902 et seq, defined stalking as:

"engaging in a course of conduct directed at a specific person that would cause a reasonable person to—

(A) fear for his or her safety or the safety of others;
(B) suffer substantial emotional distress."

As of 2011, stalking is an offense under section 120a of the Uniform Code of Military Justice (UCMJ). The law took effect on 1 October 2007.

In 2014, new amendments were made to the Clery Act to require reporting on stalking, domestic violence, and dating violence.

In 2018, the PAWS Act became law in the United States, and it expanded the definition of stalking to include "conduct that causes a person to experience a reasonable fear of death or serious bodily injury to his or her pet".

The anti-stalking statute of Illinois is controversial. It is particularly restrictive, by the standards of this type of legislation.

=== Other ===
The Council of Europe Convention on preventing and combating violence against women and domestic violence defines and criminalizes stalking, as well as other forms of violence against women. The Convention came into force on 1 August 2014.

== See also ==
- Bullying
- Courtship disorder
- Cyberstalking
- Erotomania
- Espionage
- Estimates of sexual violence
- Gangstalking
- Gaslighting
- Kiwi Farms
- Obscene phone call
- Obsessive love
- Poison pen letter
- Secret admirer
- Serial rapist
- Surveillance
- Surveillance abuse
- Toxic masculinity
- Vexatious litigation
- Voyeurism
- Yandere
