= Harassment in the United Kingdom =

Legal topic in the United Kingdom

Harassment is a topic which, in the past few decades, has been taken increasingly seriously in the United Kingdom, and has been the subject of a number of pieces of legislation.

== Introduction ==
Racial and sex discrimination have been unlawful under the Race Relations Acts and the Equality Act 2010 (originally the Sex Discrimination Act 1975 which was repealed). Respectively, it is only comparatively recently that specific legislation has defined harassment specifically as unlawful.

Because of the rise recently in awareness of the issues involved in harassment, recent trends have shown significant rises in the number of people making claims of harassment at Employment Tribunals. If the complaint is serious, high damages may be awarded against the Employer, so it is important for the Employer to take seriously any allegation of harassment at an early stage and take steps to quickly resolve it.

There is also legislation in place to be able to deal with discrimination, and this legislation is distinct to that provided under the Sex Discrimination Act 1975 and the Race Relations Acts.

The Equality Act 2010 was amended to include the Worker Protection Act in 2023, which took effect on 26 October 2024.

Furthermore, in 2023, the Protection from Sex-based Harassment in Public Act 2023 was passed to criminalize forms of sex-based harassment in public. However, it isn't in effect as of November 2025.

=== Definition ===
Under the Protection from Harassment Act 1997 - this statute makes harassment a crime and a civil wrong:

Section 1(1): 'A course of conduct which amounts to harassment, and which the defendant knows or ought to know amounts to harassment is prohibited.'

"A person must not pursue a course of conduct

- '(a) which amounts to harassment of another, and
- (b) which he knows or ought to know amounts to harassment of the other.'

'As for what the defendant 'ought to know', the test is whether a reasonable person in possession of the same information would think it amounts to harassment' - Section 1(1)(2). The defendant need not know that their conduct amounts to harassment of the other, so long as you ought to know that your course of conduct ought to amount to harassment of the other:

Per Section 1(2) - 'the person whose course of conduct is in question ought to know that it amounts to [or involves] harassment of another if a reasonable person in possession of the same information would think the course of conduct amounted to harassment of the other.'

Harassment also occurs when, on the grounds of race, disability, sex, sexual orientation, belief or religion, an employer - or their agent such as another employee or a manager - engages in unwanted conduct which has the purpose or effect of violating an individual's dignity or creating an interrogating, degrading, hostile offensive or humiliating environment for the employee in question. This is wide spectrum, and covers all types of harassment.

Such actions can be:

- Physical conduct;
- Verbal conduct; and
- Non-verbal conduct.

In addition, while the conduct must be unwanted by the recipient, it does not necessarily have to be that the harasser has a motive or an intention to harass. So it is still harassment even if the harasser does not know that harm will be caused by their actions.

== Requirements for the Tort of Harassment ==
Whilst under Section 2 of the Protection from Harassment Act 1997, states that harassment is a crime, the statute also provides a civil remedy, for actual or apprehended harassment under section 3(1).

'In life one has to put up with a certain amount of annoyance', but 'To cross the boundary from the regrettable to the unacceptable, the gravity of the misconduct must be of an order which would sustain criminal liability under section 2.' Under the Protection from Harassment Act 1997, Section 7(2) 'References to harassing a person include alarming the person or causing the person distress.'

=== Elements ===
==== Alarm or distress ====
'As with any common English word, what amounts to harassment, alarm or distress in any given situation is a question of fact for the magistrates.'

However, whilst it is 'evident that the 1997 Act created an offence of potentially enormous scope, 'Not any trivial act of harassment will do; there is a minimum level of alarm and distress which must be suffered in order to constitute harassment.' This has been specified in previous case law that mere alarm or distress might not be enough to result in the defendant being liable for harassment; the defendant's behaviour must be oppressive. Moreover, in the case of Hayes v Willoughby, harassment was described as a persistent and deliberate course of unreasonable and oppressive conduct, targeted at another person, calculated to cause 'alarm, fear and/or distress.'

Furthermore, following Pill LJ's judgment: 'To harass as defined in the Concise Oxford Dictionary, Tenth Edition, is to "torment by subjecting to constant interference or intimidation. The conduct must be unacceptable to a degree which would sustain criminal liability and also must be oppressive.'

==== Course of conduct ====
There 'must be a course of conduct, that is to say conduct on at least two occasions.' 'A single act of harassment will not amount to an offence.' Under Section 7(3): A course of conduct must involve-

(a) 'In the case of conduct in relation to a single person, conduct on at least two occasions in relation to that person, or

(b) in the case of conduct in relation to two or more persons, conduct on at least one occasion in relation to each of those persons.'

So, a single occasion is not enough. For example, in the case of R v Curtis where the defendant was in a volatile relationship with the claimant. The court 'required proof of a course of conduct,' and it was held the 'course of conduct [present here] amounted to harassment.'

==== What about where the conduct is not targeted at the claimant? ====
It is not necessary that the victim themselves be the target:

- 'Liability is incurred where the defendant engaged in a course of conduct which they knew, or ought to have known, amounted to harassment.
- The conduct does not need to be targeted at the claimant, although it must be foreseeable that the claimant will suffer the harm.'

For example, in the case of Levi v Bates [2015], the defendant published the claimant's address and number, however, the wife of the claimant also suffered distress and alarm resultant of this. The court held that although the husband was the target of the harassment, the wife could also sue because it was foreseeable that she too would have been harassed by the defendant's conduct.

== Employer's liability ==
An employer is liable, as is the case for many other acts, for the actions of their employees during the course of employment. Though it would be relatively easier to prove that a manager or supervisor to the recipient could be guilty of harassing "during the course of employment", it may require more proof if the harasser is in a subordinate position.

Employers can avoid liability for discriminatory harassment if they can prove that they took such steps that were reasonably practical to prevent harassment from occurring.

However, employers cannot use this defence to a claim of harassment under the Protection from Harassment Act 1997, under which they will have vicarious liability for the actions of their employees.

== Legislation ==
The United Kingdom has a "rag bag of statutes" relating to harassment.

=== Administration of Justice Act 1970 ===
Section 40 of the Administration of Justice Act 1970 creates the offence of harassing a contract debtor.

=== Protection from Eviction Act 1977 ===
The marginal note to section 1 of the Protection from Eviction Act 1977 refers to "harassment of occupier".

=== Public Order Act 1986 ===
Section 4A of the Public Order Act 1986, inserted by the Criminal Justice and Public Order Act 1994, creates the offence of intentional harassment, alarm or distress.

Section 5 creates the offence of harassment, alarm or distress.

=== Protection from Harassment Act 1997 ===
This Act was primarily created to provide protection against stalkers, but it has been used in other ways.

Under this Act, it is now an offence for a person to pursue a course of action which amounts to harassment of another individual, and that they know or ought to know amounts to harassment. Under this act the definition of harassment is behaviour which causes alarm or distress. This Act provides for a jail sentence of up to six months or a fine. There are also a variety of civil remedies that can be used including awarding of damages, and restraining orders backed by the power of arrest.

The introduction of this legislation considers 'emotional harm generally,' which was considered a 'radical change to the law.'

Employers have vicarious liability for harassment by their employees under the Protection from Harassment Act 1997, (see Majrowski v Guy's and St Thomas' NHS Trust). For employees this may provide an easier route to compensation than claims based on discrimination legislation or personal injury claims for stress at work, as the elements of harassment are likely to be easier to prove, the statutory defence is not available to the employer, and it may be easier to establish a claim for compensation. Also as the claim can be made in the County Court costs are recoverable and legal aid is available.

In Scotland the Act works slightly differently:

- A jail term of up to five years in very serious cases can be imposed.
- Civil remedies include damages, interdict and non-harassment orders backed by powers of arrest.

== Defences ==
Under the Protection from Harassment Act ‘1(3) Subsection (1) [or (1A)] does not apply to a course of conduct if the person who pursued it shows—

- (a) that it was pursued for the purpose of preventing or detecting crime
- (b) that it was pursued under any enactment or rule of law or to comply with any condition or requirement imposed by any person under an enactment, or
- (c) that in the particular circumstances the pursuit of the course of conduct was reasonable.'

For example, shown again in the case of Hayes v Willoughby where the defendant was making allegations against his former employer of fraud, embezzlement and tax evasion and engaged in a six-year campaign, writing to the police of the Department of Trade and Industry, among others. However, after investigation there was found to be nothing behind the allegations. Yet, even after the police shared their conclusions the defendant continued to make allegations. This amounted to harassment, as there was no further rational basis to continue his 'investigations.' Hence, the defence under Section 1(3)(a) was not upheld:

'[13] It cannot be the case that the mere existence of a belief, however absurd, in the mind of the harasser that he is detecting or preventing a possibly non-existent crime, will justify him in persisting in a course of conduct which the law characterises as oppressive. Some control mechanism is required, even if it falls well short of requiring the alleged harasser to prove that his alleged purpose was objectively reasonable'.

[15] ‘Before an alleged harasser can be said to have had the purpose of preventing or detecting crime, he must have sufficiently applied his mind to the matter. He must have thought rationally about the material suggesting the possibility of criminality and formed the view that the conduct said to constitute harassment was appropriate for the purpose of preventing or detecting it. If he has done these things, then he has the relevant purpose.’

== Damages ==
See the main article: Damages

Under Section 3(2), compensatory damages may be awarded for anxiety and financial loss resultant of the harassment. Harassment incurs liability for all direct losses, and not merely those which were reasonably foreseeable.

Potential remedies also include an injunction, and if that injunction is transgressed, the claimant may apply for an arrest warrant under Section 3(3). For example, in the case of Brand v Berki, the claimant made repeated serious criminal allegations against Russell Brand, the comedian. She had reported the matter to the police, who investigated and said there was no cause to answer. However, she continued with the allegations in the national press and on Twitter. Resultantly, an interim injunction was granted, pending trial.

== See also ==
- United Kingdom employment equality law
- Sexual harassment
- United Kingdom labour law
- Workplace harassment
