= Rossendale by-election =

Rossendale by-election may refer to:

- 1892 Rossendale by-election
- 1900 Rossendale by-election
- 1904 Rossendale by-election
- 1917 Rossendale by-election
