= Hameldon Hill =

Hill in Lancashire, England

Hameldon
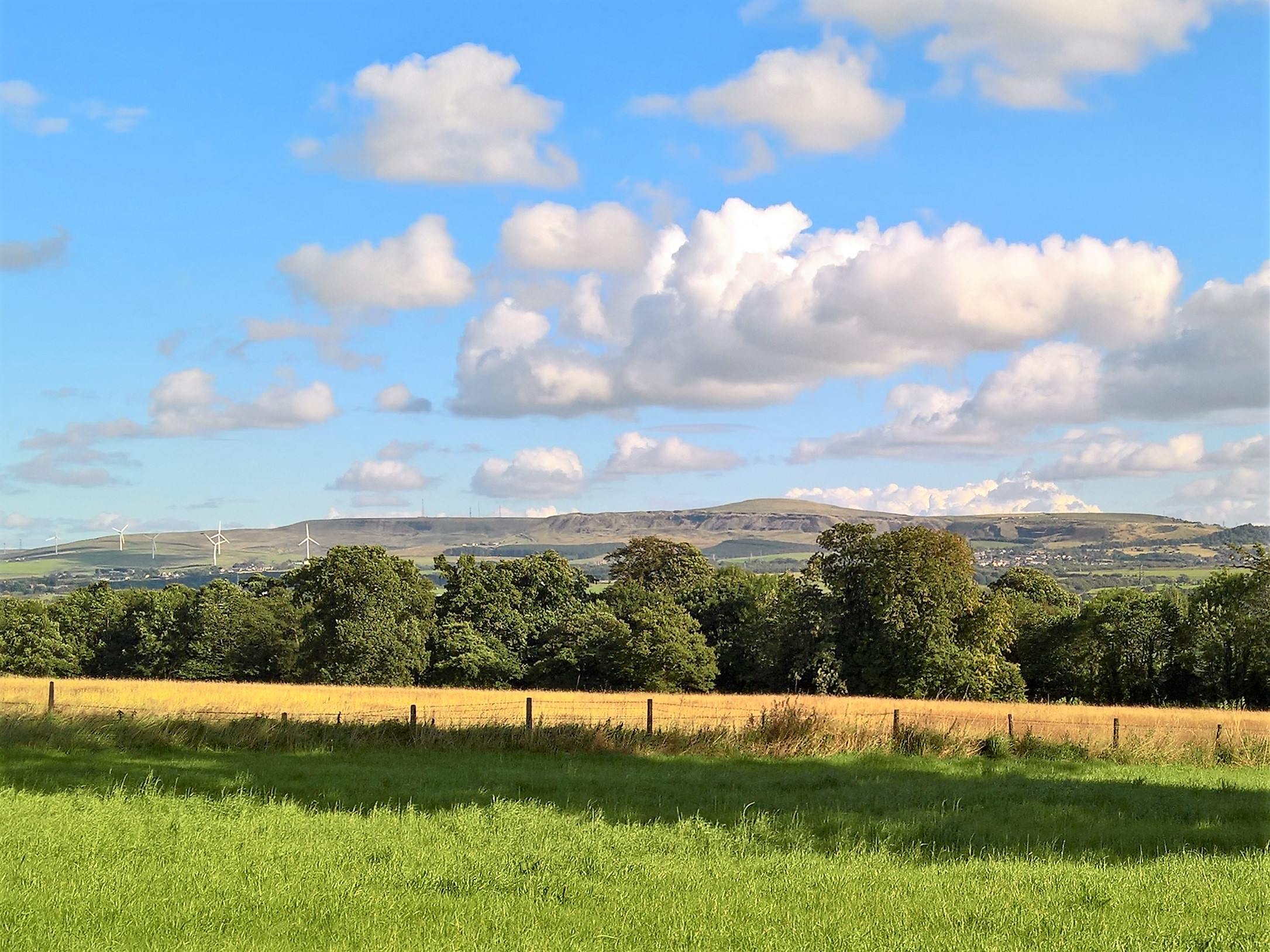
- Hameldon viewed from Read Hall Park

Highest point
- Elevation: 408.7 m (1,341 ft)
- Prominence: 107 m (351 ft)
- Parent peak: Freeholds Top
- Listing: Hump
- Coordinates: 53.7563°N 2.3137°W

Geography
- Location within Lancashire
- Location: Lancashire, England
- Parent range: Pennines
- OS grid: SD79412892
- Topo map: OS Explorer 287

Hameldon Hill is a Carboniferous sandstone hill with a summit elevation of 409 metres (1,342 ft), situated between the towns of Burnley and Accrington in Lancashire, England. It is listed as a "HuMP" or "Hundred Metre Prominence", its parent being Freeholds Top, (Note: Freeholds Top 53.6933°N 2.1438°W) a Marilyn near Bacup.

Other nearby settlements include Hapton and hamlets of Clowbridge and Dunnockshaw in the Borough of Burnley, Huncoat and Baxenden in Hyndburn, and Crawshawbooth, Goodshaw and Loveclough in the Borough of Rossendale.

Located on the western side of the Pennines, its summit is the highest point an isolated area, separated from the South Pennines and the West Pennine Moors. The Cliviger Gorge lies to the east, the Rossendale Valley to the south, and the valley of the River Hyndburn to the west. Pendle Hill stands to the north, across the wide valley of the Lancashire Calder.

== History ==
The name Hameldon is used for two others in the local area, (Note: Black Hameldon 53.763°N 2.1285°W and Hameldon Pasture 53.7895°N 2.1675°W) and is possibly the same as Hambledon Hill in Dorset. The second element is likely Old English dūn meaning hill, the first is possibly from hamelian meaning to mutilate or maim. The precise meaning in these cases is uncertain, but possibly relates to their appearance.

A number of flint tools thought to date to the Mesolithic period have been found at the Great Hameldon summit. Located close to the edge of the plateau to the north, is a small mound called Little Hameldon. It is c.5 metres (16 ft) high and 60 metres (200 ft) long by 30 metres (98 ft) wide, and has been proposed as the remains of a chambered long barrow dating from the early Neolithic to early Bronze Age periods.

Huncoat, on the northern slope, is one of the few places mentioned in the brief details of the Blackburnshire hundred in the Domesday Book, with King Edward holding two carucates of land here. The settlements of Dunnockshaw, Loveclough, Goodshaw and Crawshawbooth along the valley of Limy Water to the south east, can trace their history to vaccaries (Medieval cattle ranches) in the Forest of Rossendale. The Towneley family of Burnley's Towneley Hall are descendants of the Del la Legh family, several generations of whom, held the position of chief stock master of the vaccaries in Rossendale and the other forests of the Blackburn Hundred. During the 14th century they would acquire the manors of Hapton and the now lost Birtwistle, thought to have been located somewhere within Hapton civil parish.

Sir John Towneley obtained the first of two licenses to create deer park in Hapton in 1496-1497 and is thought to have built Hapton Tower within it. After the King's commissioners re-let Rossendale to local farmers in 1507, Towneley in 1514 enlarged his deer park to embrace 1100 Lancashire acres (as much as 2,000 acres (810 ha)) making it the second largest in historic Lancashire after that of the Earl of Derby at Knowsley. Its irregular boundaries covered much of the eastern part of the hill, stretching from the plateau of Great Hill, north to Bentley Wood Green. By 1615 deer were no longer kept in the park, though it was not divided into the present-day farms until the early 18th century.

Considered part of the Burnley Coalfield, evidence of bell pits, a primitive method of mining, can still be found at Moleside Moor on the western side of the hill. Cupola Colliery mined coal from a number of shafts on the top of the hill, and was already established by the mid-1840s. The colliery was abandoned at the end of 1887 and the site subsequently cleared. The embankment created for its surface tramway can still be traced. It was superseded by several others on its slopes, including Hapton Valley Colliery, which survived to be the last deep mine operating on the Burnley Coalfield, closing in 1982.

A number of smaller quarries at Hameldon Scouts had grown by 1886 into the Hameldon Quarries, when Henry Heys and Co took over the operation. It supplied large quantities of flagstones for the construction of mills in Burnley and Padiham. At that time tram roads connected the main site to another at Snipe Rake and to a facility at Park Gate Farm. These quarries ceased operation in 1909, but extensive remains still exist. Since the late 19th century, the Accrington area has been known for the production of Accrington brick. Brick-clay has been extracted from the Huncoat Quarry at Rakehead, which was connected to the Huncoat Plastic Brick and Terracotta Company, and was still being operated by Ibstock in the early 2000s.

The Mitchell's House Reservoirs in the upper valley of Warmden Brook, are two bodies of water separated by an intermediate embankment, forming a single impoundment. Construction of the L-shaped embankment dam of the northern (No 1) reservoir commenced in 1851, but significant issues were encountered in achieving a satisfactory level of water retention. After 1872, the southern (No 2) reservoir was created by extending the western section of the original dam to span the valley, a total distance of 520 metres (1,710 ft). Between 1881 and 1892 major repairs were undertaken, especially to the older dam, before both could be declared watertight. Subsidence problems that have effected the reservoirs have likely been exacerbated by coal-mining underneath it, which did not cease until 1905.

During World War II a network of Starfish site bombing decoys where constructed in the area designed to protect Accrington. Two of the sites are on Hameldon, one near Heights Farm on the south-eastern side, and the other on the south-western side overlooking the reservoir. The Heights Farm site is protected as a Scheduled monument.

The Met Office north west England weather radar is situated on Hameldon Hill. Commissioned in 1975 this was the first unmanned installation of the 15 that form the national weather radar network. Nearby are a number of communication masts including one that broadcasts BBC Radio Lancashire.

Today the A56 runs through a large cutting on the north-western side of Hameldon, effectively separating Accrington's Peel Park from the rest of the hill. This was constructed between February 1984 and July 1985 as part of the Accrington Easterly By-pass scheme, itself the last section of a larger project to create a dual carriageway route between the M66 and M65.

Hameldon Hill Wind Farm, located on the northern side of the hill, became operational in 2007. Initially consisting of three turbines, a further three were added around 2012.

== Geography ==
Hameldon has two summits, the highest point is known as Great Hameldon and attains 1,343 feet (409 m). To the east the ground falls slightly before gradually rising to 1,305 feet (398 m) at a point known as Great Hill. To the south of Great Hameldon, the hill gives-out a spur of child peaks, terminating at Cribden Hill near Haslingden. At the eastern end are Black, Nutshaw and Burnt hills.

The underlying geology of the area consists of Lower Westphalian coal measures of the Carboniferous era, while the hills are formed of Carboniferous sandstones, ranging from millstone grits to finer grained stone such as the Dyneley Knott flags and the Dandy Mine Rock. The drift cover consists primarily of glacial till deposits, which cause poor-drainage soils, meaning the grassland is prone to reed growth.

On the northern slopes Castle Clough Brook runs north through a significant valley to join the River Calder, and both Shorten and Clough Brooks, further west, also drain the lower parts of the hill. On the eastern side New Barn Clough also flows north to join Habergham Brook, which along with Hapton Clough forms Green Brook at Spa Wood. In the centre a number of small streams combine to form Shaw Brook, which flows on the eastern side of Hapton and joins Green Brook just before its confluence with the Calder in Padiham.

On the western side Warmden Brook forms to the south of the Great Hameldon summit, feeding the Mitchell's House Reservoirs and becoming Broad Oak Water after it collects the stream from Tag Clough. Pleck Brook drains the area to the north, where several smaller reservoirs have also been created, and like Broad Oak Water joins the River Hyndburn in Accrington and ultimately the Calder. The southern slopes are primarily drained by three streams, one falls through Bank Clough in the east, and the others through Whin Hill and Great Cloughs in the west. All join Limy Water, a tributary of the River Irwell.

The Burnley Way passes over the hill, following the old road from Hapton to Haslingden as it climbs Hameldon, before descending to Clow Bridge.

== Folklore ==
There is an ancient local legend that the Devil once jumped from Hameldon to Pendle Hill where he gathered rocks in an apron, and threw a boulder aimed at Clitheroe Castle.

Without Royal permission Sir John Towneley enclosed land on Horelaw Hill, to the north of Clowbridge Reservoir, to connect his deer park to Towneley Hall. Some of this was common land and the injustice, which was not reversed until 1556, made him unpopular with the local people. A tradition arose that his ghost wanders the hills calling "Be warned! Lay out! Be warned! Lay out! Around Horelaw and Hollin Hey Clough".

== Media gallery ==
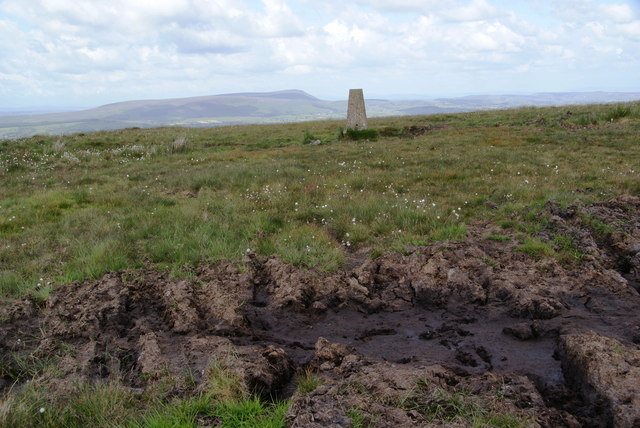
Trig point at the summit with Pendle Hill in the background.

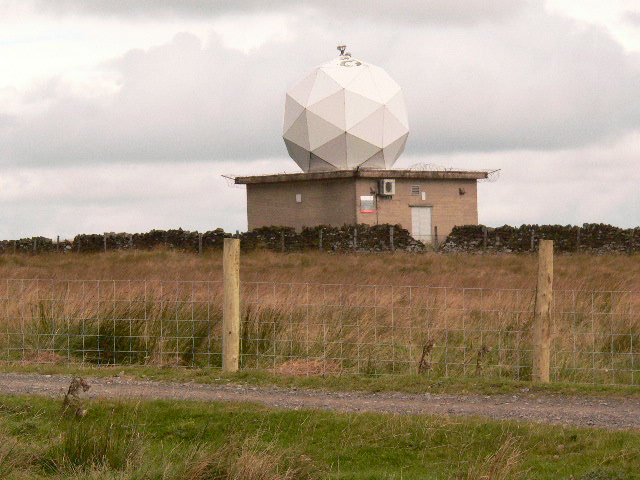
Met Office north-west England weather radar on Hambledon Hill.

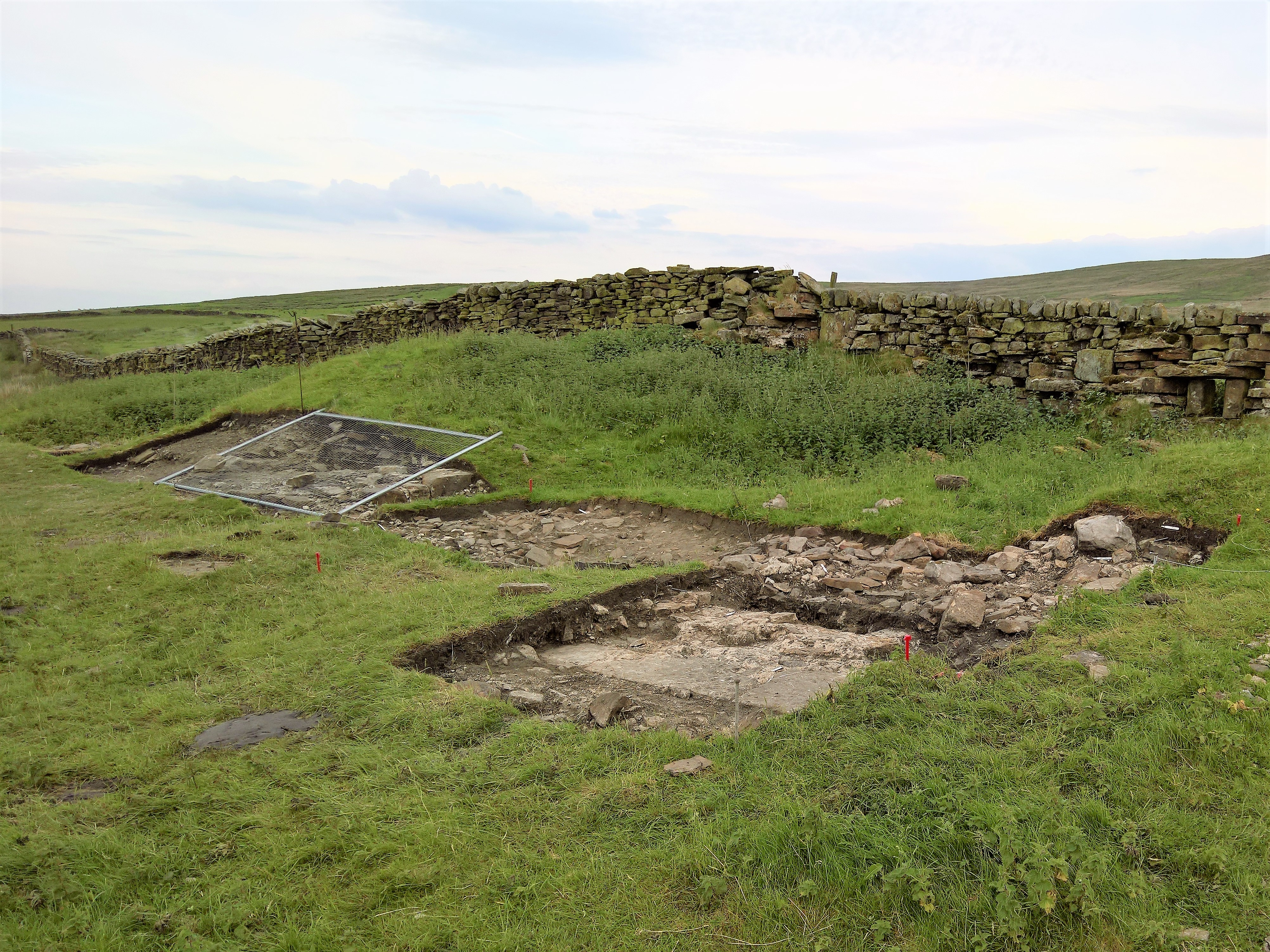
Archaeological excavation at the site of Hapton Tower.

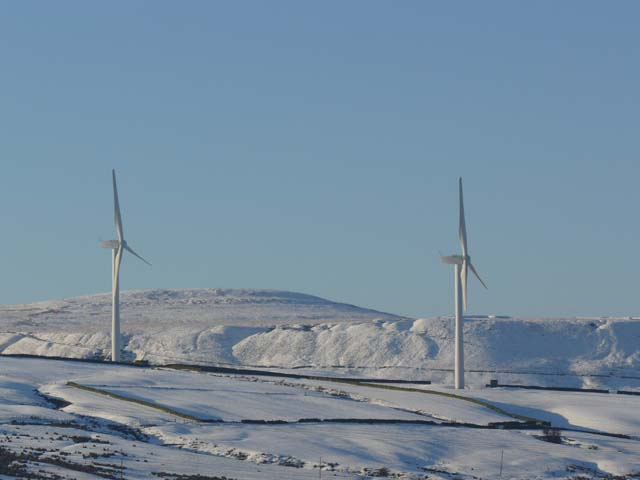
Two of the Hameldon Hill Wind Farm turbines in the winter of 2008.

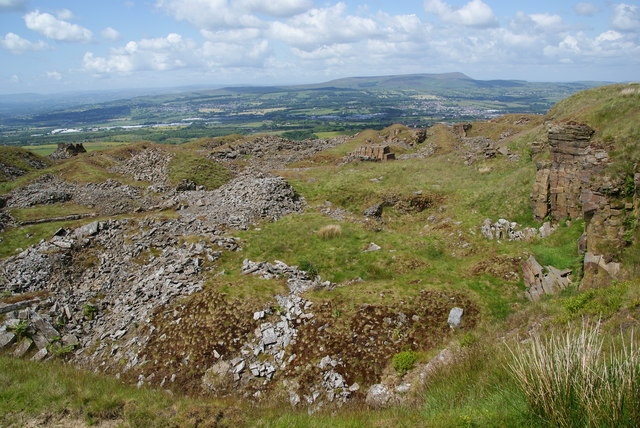
Old quarry workings at Hameldon Scouts.

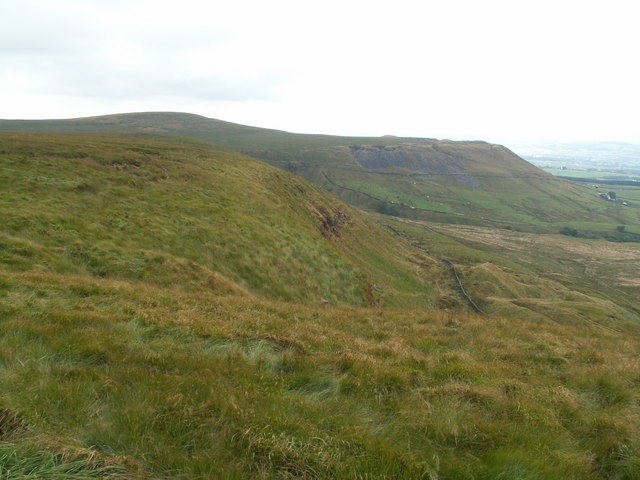
Looking towards Great Hameldon from Hameldon.

== See also ==
- Scheduled monuments in Lancashire
