= Rossendale (constituency) =

Parliamentary constituency in the United Kingdom, 1885-1983

Coordinates: 53.708°N 2.240°W

- Former county constituency for the House of Commons
- Rossendale in Lancashire, showing boundaries used from 1974-1983
- County: Lancashire
- Major settlements: Rawtenstall

1885–1983
- Seats: One
- Created from: North East Lancashire
- Replaced by: Rossendale and Darwen; Bury North

Rossendale was a parliamentary constituency in the Lancashire, England. Created in 1885, it elected one Member of Parliament (MP) to the House of Commons of the Parliament of the United Kingdom, elected by the first-past-the-post voting system. When created it comprised the districts of Rawtenstall, Bacup, and Haslingden; Ramsbottom district was added to the constituency in 1950.

The constituency ceased to exist with the implementation of the 1983 boundary changes and was replaced by the Rossendale and Darwen constituency. The exact nature of the changes were as follows: 9,882 electors of the Rossendale seat were transferred to Bury North. 25,918 electors were added from the abolished Darwen constituency and 5,267 from Heywood and Royton.

== Boundaries ==
1885–1918: The Sessional Division of Rossendale, and part of the Borough of Bacup.

1918–1950: The Boroughs of Bacup, Haslingden, and Rawtenstall.

1950–1983: The Boroughs of Bacup, Haslingden, and Rawtenstall, and the Urban District of Ramsbottom.

== Members of Parliament ==
Election	Member	Party
1885	Marquess of Hartington	Liberal
1886	Marquess of Hartington	Liberal Unionist
1892 by-election	John Maden	Liberal
1900 by-election	Sir William Mather	Liberal
1904 by-election	Lewis Harcourt	Liberal
1917 by-election	Sir John Maden	Liberal
1918	Robert Waddington	Coalition Conservative
1922	David Halstead	Conservative
1923	Robert Waddington	Conservative
1929	Arthur Law	Labour
1931	Ronald Cross	Conservative
1945	George Walker	Labour
1950	Tony Greenwood	Labour
1970	Ronald Bray	Conservative
Oct 1974	Michael Noble	Labour
1979	David Trippier	Conservative
1983	constituency abolished: see Rossendale and Darwen	

== Elections ==
=== Elections in the 1880s ===
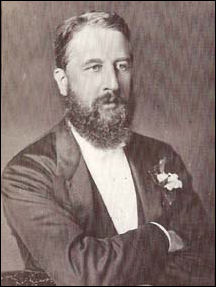
Hartington

General election 1885: Rossendale
Party	Candidate	Votes	%	±%
Liberal	Marquess of Hartington	6,060	58.9	
Conservative	William Farrer Ecroyd	4,228	41.1	
Majority		1,832	17.8	
Turnout		10,288	89.9	
Registered electors		11,450		
Liberal win (new seat)				

General election 1886: Rossendale
Party	Candidate	Votes	%	±%
Liberal Unionist	Marquess of Hartington	5,399	57.8	+16.7
Liberal	Thomas Newbigging	3,949	42.2	−16.7
Majority		1,450	15.6	N/A
Turnout		9,348	81.6	−8.3
Registered electors		11,450		
Liberal Unionist gain from Liberal		Swing	+16.7	

=== Elections in the 1890s ===
Cavendish succeeded to the peerage, becoming Duke of Devonshire and causing a by-election.

1892 Rossendale by-election
Party	Candidate	Votes	%	±%
Liberal	John Maden	6,066	55.6	+13.4
Liberal Unionist	Thomas Brooks	4,841	44.4	−13.4
Majority		1,225	11.2	N/A
Turnout		10,907	93.4	+11.8
Registered electors		11,679		
Liberal gain from Liberal Unionist		Swing	+13.4	

General election 1892: Rossendale
Party	Candidate	Votes	%	±%
Liberal	John Maden	6,058	58.3	+16.1
Conservative	Arthur Goldsmith Sparrow	4,334	41.7	−16.1
Majority		1,724	16.6	N/A
Turnout		10,392	89.0	+7.4
Registered electors		11,679		
Liberal gain from Liberal Unionist		Swing	+16.1	

General election 1895: Rossendale
Party	Candidate	Votes	%	±%
Liberal	John Maden	Unopposed		
Liberal hold				

=== Elections in the 1900s ===
William Mather

1900 Rossendale by-election
Party	Candidate	Votes	%	±%
Liberal	William Mather	5,936	56.5	N/A
Conservative	George Kingsbury	4,564	43.5	New
Majority		1,372	13.0	N/A
Turnout		10,500	86.4	N/A
Registered electors		12,148		
Liberal hold		Swing	N/A	

General election 1900: Rossendale Electorate 12,148
Party	Candidate	Votes	%	±%
Liberal	William Mather	Unopposed		
Liberal hold				

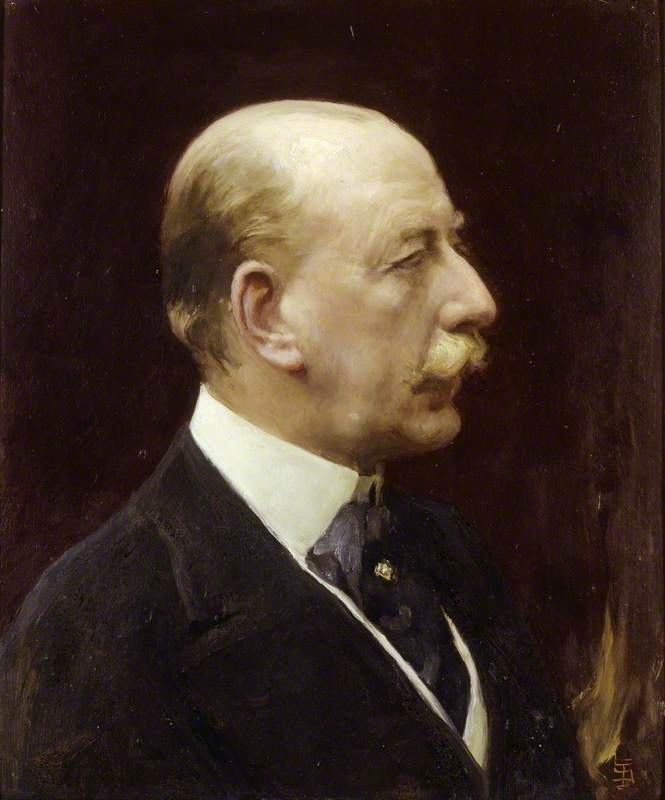
Lewis Harcourt

1904 Rossendale by-election
Party	Candidate	Votes	%	±%
Liberal	Lewis Harcourt	Unopposed		
Liberal hold				

General election 1906: Rossendale
Party	Candidate	Votes	%	±%
Liberal	Lewis Harcourt	6,881	59.6	N/A
Conservative	John Kebty-Fletcher	4,662	40.4	New
Majority		2,219	19.2	N/A
Turnout		11,543	90.4	N/A
Registered electors		12,765		
Liberal hold		Swing	N/A	

=== Elections in the 1910s ===
General election January 1910: Rossendale Electorate 12,765
Party	Candidate	Votes	%	±%
Liberal	Lewis Harcourt	7,185	57.4	−2.2
Conservative	John Kebty-Fletcher	4,695	37.5	−2.9
Women's Suffrage	Arthur Bulley	639	5.1	New
Majority		2,490	19.9	+0.7
Turnout		12,519	94.7	+4.3
Registered electors		13,217		
Liberal hold		Swing	+0.4	

General election December 1910: Rossendale Electorate 12,765
Party	Candidate	Votes	%	±%
Liberal	Lewis Harcourt	6,619	56.0	−1.4
Conservative	Joshua Craven Hoyle	5,206	44.0	+6.5
Majority		1,413	12.0	−7.9
Turnout		11,825	89.5	−5.2
Registered electors		13,217		
Liberal hold		Swing	−4.0	

General Election 1914–15: Another General Election was required to take place before the end of 1915. The political parties had been making preparations for an election to take place and by July 1914, the following candidates had been selected;

- Liberal: Lewis Harcourt
- Unionist:

1917 Rossendale by-election
Party	Candidate	Votes	%	±%
Liberal	John Maden	6,019	76.9	+20.9
Independent Labour and Peace by Negotiation	Albert Taylor	1,804	23.1	New
Majority		4,215	53.8	+41.8
Turnout		7,823	57.2	−32.3
Registered electors		13,682		
Liberal hold		Swing		

General election 1918: Rossendale
Party		Candidate	Votes	%	±%
C	Unionist	Robert Waddington	8,907	39.2	−4.8
	Labour	Gilbert Wright Jones	7,984	35.1	New
	Liberal	John Maden	5,837	25.7	−30.3
Majority			923	4.1	N/A
Turnout			22,728	63.6	−25.9
	Unionist gain from Liberal		Swing	+12.8	
C indicates candidate endorsed by the coalition government.

=== Elections in the 1920s ===
General election 1922: Rossendale
Party	Candidate	Votes	%	±%
Unionist	David Halstead	12,881	42.6	+3.4
Labour	Gilbert Wright Jones	11,029	36.5	+1.4
Liberal	Richard Durning Holt	6,327	20.9	−4.8
Majority		1,852	6.1	+2.0
Turnout		30,237	85.0	+21.4
Unionist hold		Swing		

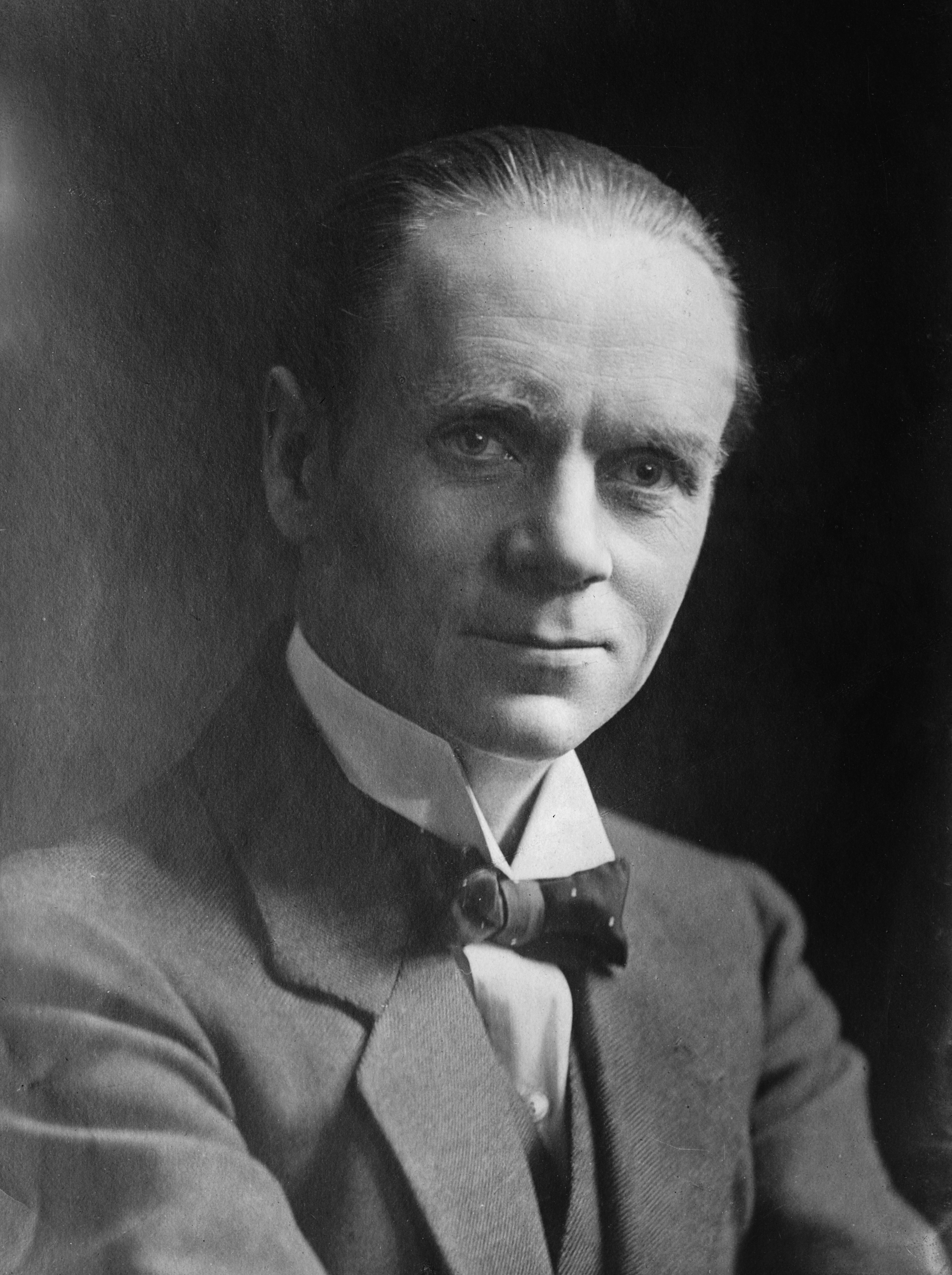
Norman Angell

General election 1923: Rossendale
Party	Candidate	Votes	%	±%
Unionist	Robert Waddington	11,362	37.6	−5.0
Liberal	Ernest Young	9,592	31.8	+10.9
Labour	Norman Angell	9,230	30.6	−5.9
Majority		1,770	5.8	−0.3
Turnout		30,184	83.8	−1.2
Unionist hold		Swing	-8.0	

General election 1924: Rossendale
Party	Candidate	Votes	%	±%
Unionist	Robert Waddington	12,836	41.7	+4.1
Labour	James Bell	9,951	32.4	+1.8
Liberal	Ernest Young	7,958	25.9	−5.9
Majority		2,885	9.3	+3.5
Turnout		30,745		
Unionist hold		Swing		

General election 1929: Rossendale
Party	Candidate	Votes	%	±%
Labour	Arthur Law	14,624	36.0	+3.6
Liberal	Edwin Bayliss	13,747	33.9	+8.0
Unionist	Wilfrid Sugden	12,225	30.1	−11.6
Majority		877	2.1	N/A
Turnout		40,596	87.7	
Labour gain from Unionist		Swing	-2.2	

- Furness Dean was Liberal candidate but withdrew at the last minute for health reasons.

=== Elections in the 1930s ===
General election 1931: Rossendale
Party	Candidate	Votes	%	±%
Conservative	Ronald Cross	16,206	40.1	+10.0
Liberal	William Furness Dean	13,089	32.4	−1.5
Labour	Arthur Law	11,135	27.5	−8.5
Majority		3,117	7.7	N/A
Turnout		40,430	87.6	−0.1
Conservative gain from Labour		Swing		

General election 1935: Rossendale
Party	Candidate	Votes	%	±%
Conservative	Ronald Cross	15,650	39.4	−0.7
Labour	Evelyn Walkden	14,769	37.1	+9.6
Liberal	Arthur Holgate	9,343	23.5	−8.9
Majority		881	2.3	−5.4
Turnout		39,762	86.1	−1.5
Conservative hold		Swing		

General Election 1939–40: Another General Election was required to take place before the end of 1940. The political parties had been making preparations for an election to take place and by the Autumn of 1939, the following candidates had been selected;

- Conservative: Ronald Cross
- Labour: George Walker

=== Election in the 1940s ===
General election 1945: Rossendale
Party	Candidate	Votes	%	±%
Labour	George Walker	15,741	43.6	+6.5
Conservative	Ronald Cross	10,153	28.1	−11.3
Liberal	Arthur Ward Jones	8,542	23.7	+0.2
Communist	William Whittaker	1,663	4.6	New
Majority		5,588	15.5	N/A
Turnout		36,099	83.2	−2.9
Labour gain from Conservative		Swing	+8.9	

=== Elections in the 1950s ===
General election 1950: Rossendale
Party	Candidate	Votes	%	±%
Labour	Tony Greenwood	21,596	45.1	+1.5
Conservative	Thomas Mercer Backhouse	19,483	40.7	+12.6
Liberal	Lillian May Tomlinson	6,757	14.1	−9.5
Majority		2,113	4.4	−11.1
Turnout		47,836	88.9	+5.7
Labour hold		Swing	−5.5	

General election 1951: Rossendale
Party	Candidate	Votes	%	±%
Labour	Tony Greenwood	24,814	51.7	+6.6
Conservative	Thomas Mercer Backhouse	23,144	48.3	+7.5
Majority		1,670	3.5	−0.9
Turnout		47,958	88.6	−0.4
Labour hold		Swing	−0.5	

General election 1955: Rossendale
Party	Candidate	Votes	%	±%
Labour	Tony Greenwood	23,472	53.3	+1.6
Conservative	John E Parkinson	20,561	46.7	−1.6
Majority		2,911	6.6	+3.1
Turnout		44,033	84.2	−4.4
Labour hold		Swing	+1.6	

General election 1959: Rossendale
Party	Candidate	Votes	%	±%
Labour	Tony Greenwood	20,743	47.5	−5.8
Conservative	James Richard Trist Holt	18,152	41.6	−5.1
Liberal	Alan Cooper	4,752	10.9	N/A
Majority		2,591	5.9	−0.7
Turnout		43,647	86.3	+2.1
Labour hold		Swing	−0.3	

=== Elections in the 1960s ===
General election 1964: Rossendale
Party	Candidate	Votes	%	±%
Labour	Tony Greenwood	21,371	54.0	+6.4
Conservative	Colin Clive Baillieu	18,230	46.0	+4.4
Majority		3,141	7.9	+2.0
Turnout		39,601	81.8	−4.5
Labour hold		Swing	+1.0	

General election 1966: Rossendale
Party	Candidate	Votes	%	±%
Labour	Tony Greenwood	21,093	55.4	+1.4
Conservative	Colin Clive Baillieu	16,984	44.6	−1.4
Majority		4,109	10.8	+2.9
Turnout		38,077	80.4	−1.4
Labour hold		Swing	+1.4	

=== Elections in the 1970s ===
General election 1970: Rossendale
Party	Candidate	Votes	%	±%
Conservative	Ronald Bray	20,448	52.4	+7.8
Labour	Betty Boothroyd	18,568	47.6	−7.8
Majority		1,880	4.8	−6.0
Turnout		39,016	78.2	−2.2
Conservative gain from Labour		Swing	+7.8	

General election February 1974: Rossendale
Party	Candidate	Votes	%	±%
Conservative	Ronald Bray	16,040	38.4	−14.0
Labour	Michael Noble	15,243	36.5	−11.1
Liberal	JA Hamilton	10,478	25.1	N/A
Majority		797	1.9	−2.9
Turnout		41,761	83.5	+5.3
Conservative hold		Swing	–1.5	

General election October 1974: Rossendale
Party	Candidate	Votes	%	±%
Labour	Michael Noble	16,156	39.6	+3.1
Conservative	Ronald Bray	15,953	39.1	+0.7
Liberal	J.A. Hamilton	8,693	21.3	–3.8
Majority		203	0.5	–1.4
Turnout		40,802	80.9	–2.6
Labour gain from Conservative		Swing	+1.2	

General election 1979: Rossendale
Party	Candidate	Votes	%	±%
Conservative	David Trippier	20,370	48.0	+8.9
Labour	Michael Noble	18,497	43.6	+4.0
Liberal	P. Arnold	3,534	8.3	−13.0
Majority		1,873	4.4	+3.9
Turnout		42,401	83.8	+2.9
Conservative gain from Labour		Swing	+2.5	

== See also ==
- Rossendale and Darwen Parliamentary constituency
