= Arthur Law (politician) =

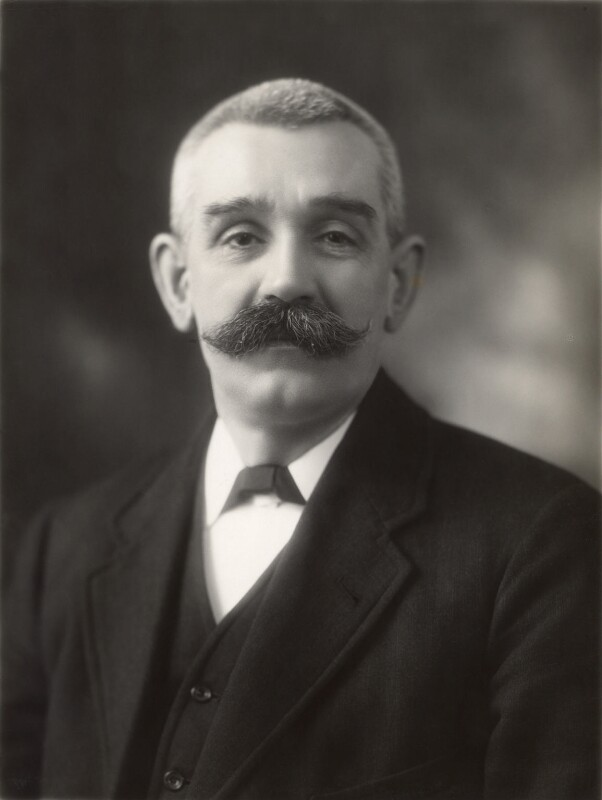
Law in 1924

Arthur Law (4 January 1876 – 30 June 1933) was a Labour Party Member of Parliament.

Law was educated at Todmorden Council School before becoming an engine driver. He joined the National Union of Railwaymen, and served on its executive committee from 1910 to 1912, 1918 to 1920, and 1925 to 1926.

Law stood unsuccessfully for the Labour Party in Salford West at the 1922 United Kingdom general election, then won Rossendale at the 1929 United Kingdom general election. He lost the seat at the 1931 United Kingdom general election, and died two years later.

Parliament of the United Kingdom
Preceded by Robert Waddington	Member of Parliament for Rossendale; 1929–1931	Succeeded by Ronald Cross
