= 1904 Rossendale by-election =

UK parliamentary by-election

The 1904 Rossendale by-election was a parliamentary by-election held for the British House of Commons constituency of Rossendale in Lancashire on 15 March 1904.

== Vacancy ==
The by-election was caused by the resignation of the sitting Liberal MP, Sir William Mather. Mather, who was 66 years old in 1904, had been Liberal MP for Salford and Manchester Gorton before winning Rossendale at a by-election in 1900. He had already announced that he would not stand at the next general election believing it would be held earlier in the Parliament elected at the 1900 general election owing to the weakness of the Conservative government. The government determined to hang on however and Mather decided to resign. He chose the traditional route of applying for the Chiltern Hundreds.

== Candidates ==
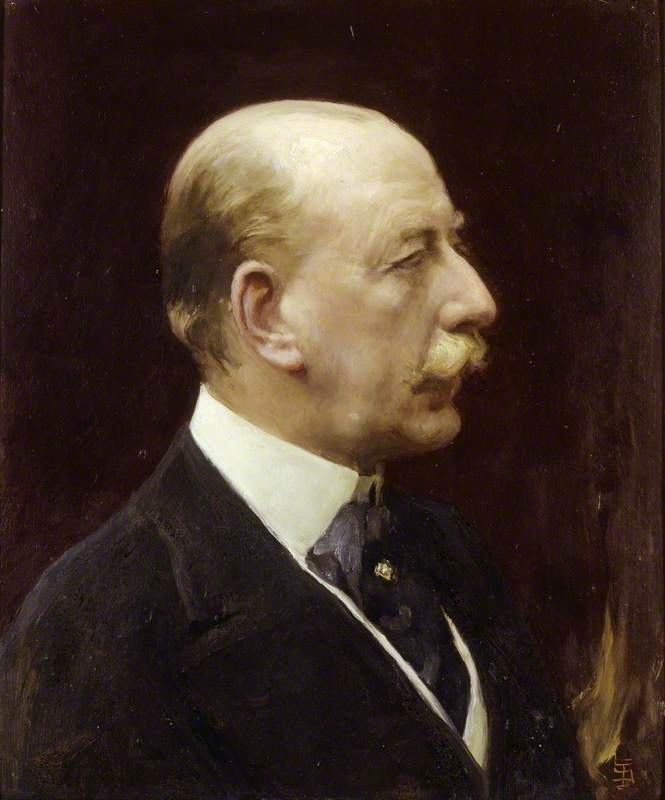
Lewis Harcourt

=== Liberals ===
The Rossendale Liberals had already selected as their candidate Lewis Harcourt in anticipation of Mather's standing down.

=== Unionists ===
The local Conservatives had not expected a by-election and did not have a candidate in the field. Rossendale was a traditionally Liberal seat. It had been held by the Liberals since its creation for the 1885 general election with only the interlude of 1886-1892 when it was represented by the former Liberal MP the Marquess of Hartington having switched to the Liberal Unionists. The Unionists were forced to look as far abroad as Wimbledon for a candidate, approaching Colonel T Mitchell who was the brother of the Tory MP for Burnley but he declined to stand. They next turned to Mr John Whittaker, a cotton trader from Wilpshire, near Blackburn but he too declined to fight the seat. In the event the Conservatives were unable to find anyone willing to contest a Liberal stronghold, citing the serious state of the Lancashire cotton industry as the reason.

=== Labour ===
The Labour Party, then known as the Labour Representation Committee, considered putting up a candidate. They first approached Daniel Irving, a leading socialist from Burnley, but he said he was too busy working for Henry Hyndman another prominent Labour politician. In the end, like the Conservatives, the Labour Party chose not to contest the by-election.

== Issues ==
It being an uncontested election, topical political issues were not subject to public debate. However, Harcourt did issue an election address in which he stated that his main concerns were taxation, Chinese labour in South Africa, education and temperance. He also confirmed his position as an out-and-out free trader.

== Result ==
Harcourt was returned unopposed. He held the seat until 1917 when he became a peer. In the ensuing by-election the seat was held for the Liberals by Sir John Henry Maden.

Rossendale by-election, 1904
Party	Candidate	Votes	%	±%
Liberal	Lewis Harcourt	Unopposed	N/A	N/A
Liberal hold				

== See also ==
- List of United Kingdom by-elections
- United Kingdom by-election records
