= James Dickinson =

James Dickinson may refer to:

- James Shelton Dickinson (1818–1882), Confederate States of America politician
- James Dickinson (cricketer) (born 1998), Scottish cricketer
- James Charles (James Charles Dickinson, born 1999), American internet celebrity and model
- James H. Dickinson, United States Army general
- James Dickinson (taxidermist) (born 1950), English taxidermist
- Jimmy Dickinson (1925–1982), English footballer
- Jimmy Dickinson (footballer, born 1899) (1899–1971), English footballer
- Jim Dickinson (1941–2009), American record producer, pianist, and singer
