= David Halstead =

Major David Halstead (1861–1937) was a Conservative MP for Rossendale (UK Parliament constituency).

A long-time member of the Volunteers and Territorial Army (East Lancashire Regiment), Halstead saw action during the First World War. He was Mayor of Mayor of Haslingden in 1917, 1918, and 1919, and was a local antiquarian and historian.

He won Rossendale in 1922, but stood down in 1923.

== See also ==
Parliament of the United Kingdom
Preceded by Robert Waddington	Member of Parliament for Rossendale; 1922–1923	Succeeded by Robert Waddington

== Sources ==
- Craig, F. W. S. (1983) [1969]. British parliamentary election results 1918-1949 (3rd ed.). Chichester: Parliamentary Research Services. ISBN 0-900178-06-X.
- Whitaker's Almanack 1923 edition
- Leigh Rayment's historical list of MPs
