= Limy Water =

River in Lancashire, England

Coordinates: 53.8701°N 2.4157°W

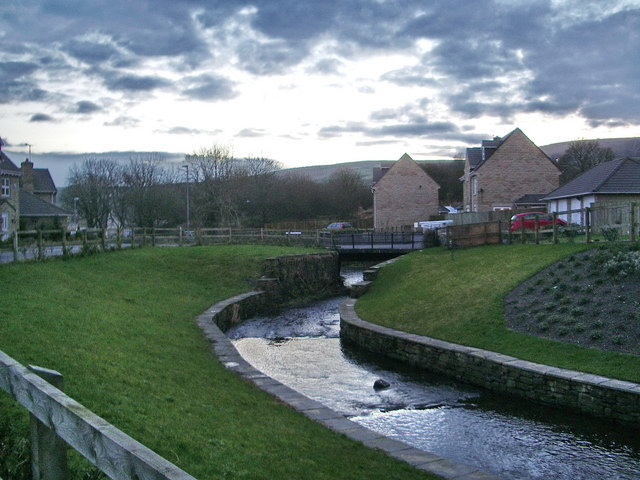
Limy Water at Loveclough in 2008

The Limy Water is a minor river in Lancashire, England. It is 4.95 miles (7.96 km) long and has a catchment area of 7.71 square miles (1,996.33 ha).

The stream rises on the hillside close to Crown Point in Habergham Eaves near Burnley, just east of the Clowbridge Reservoir which it feeds. After exiting the reservoir and crossing the A682 Burnley Road it heads southwest to the Hillside Fishery at Loveclough. Along the way it is augmented by several small streams, notably those which fall through Bank, Whin Hill and Great Cloughs, on the southern slopes of Hameldon. Turning gradually to the south, it flows on to Goodshaw. Continuing past Crawshawbooth, it joins the River Irwell in the centre of Rawtenstall.

| Next confluence upstream | River Irwell | Next confluence downstream |
| Whitewell Brook (North) | Limy Water | River Ogden (West) |
