= William Mather =

British politician and industrialist

William Mather

Sir William Mather PC (15 July 1838 – 18 September 1920) was a British industrialist and Liberal politician who sat in the House of Commons between 1885 and 1904.

== Life ==
Mather was born in Manchester, the son of William Mather and his wife, Amelia (née Tidswell), and was educated privately. He became chairman of the engineering company of Mather and Platt, Salford who owned the Salford Ironworks. As an employer he was notable for introducing the eight-hour working day for his workers. He was also a J.P. and was elected to membership of the Manchester Literary and Philosophical Society on 1 November 1864.

Mather was elected as a Member of Parliament (MP) for Salford in 1885, before being removed at the 1886 election. In 1889 he was elected as MP for Gorton in a by-election, a position he held until his defeat at the 1895 general election. He returned to the House of Commons in February 1900 when he won a by-election in the Rossendale division of Lancashire, where he remained until his resignation in 1904.

Apart from his parliamentary and commercial activities, Mather had an interest in the promotion of education, including pioneering the idea of standardised testing. He utilised the results of academic testing in the development of Apprenticeship schemes, at British Westinghouse. It resulted in a selection programme based on tested intelligence. He was on the council of Owen's College and of Manchester University, and was chairman of the Froebel Educational Institute. He was also in charge of the British education section of the Franco-British Exhibition of 1908.

In 1902 he was knighted in the 1902 Coronation Honours for his help reorganising the War Office during the Second Boer War, receiving the accolade from King Edward VII at Buckingham Palace on 24 October that year. He was made a member of the Privy Council in 1910.

In 1915 Mather attended the third Conference of the New Ideals in Education in Stratford where a group including Belle Rennie, Percy Nunn and Mather agreed that a new teacher training facility was required. This would lead to the Gipsy Hill College in South London which in time became a key part of Kingston University.

Mather married Emma Watson, daughter of Thomas Watson of Highbury, in 1863 and they had five children. Mather is buried in the churchyard of St Mary's Church, Prestwich.

== See also ==
- John F. Baddeley

Parliament of the United Kingdom
New constituency	Member of Parliament for Salford South; 1885 – 1886	Succeeded by Henry Hoyle Howorth
Preceded by Richard Peacock	Member of Parliament for Gorton; 1889 – 1895	Succeeded by Ernest Frederic George Hatch
Preceded by John Henry Maden	Member of Parliament for Rossendale; 1900 – 1904	Succeeded by Lewis Harcourt
