= Goodshaw =

Hamlet in Lancashire, England

Coordinates: 53.729°N 2.287°W

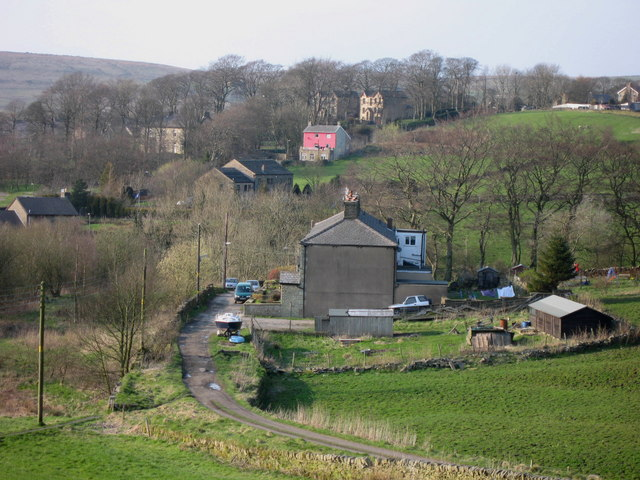
- Goodshaw in 2007

- Location within Rossendale Location within Lancashire
- Population: 4,033 (2011.Ward)
- OS grid reference: SD810259
- District: Rossendale
- Shire county: Lancashire
- Region: North West
- Country: England
- Sovereign state: United Kingdom
- Post town: ROSSENDALE
- Postcode district: BB4
- Dialling code: 01706
- Police: Lancashire
- Fire: Lancashire
- Ambulance: North West
- UK Parliament: Rossendale and Darwen

Goodshaw is a hamlet situated on the edge of the Pennine hills in England, located just north of the market town of Rawtenstall in Lancashire. To the south, it is adjacent to the village of Crawshawbooth, with Rawtenstall located further south. It is also a ward of Rossendale, where the population taken at the 2011 census was 4,033.

== See also ==
- Listed buildings in Rawtenstall
