= George Walker (MP for Rossendale) =

George Henry Walker (1874 – 24 January 1954) was a British Labour Party politician. He was Member of Parliament (MP) for Rossendale from 1945 to 1950.

== Overview ==
Walker unsuccessfully contested Blackburn at the 1935 general election. He was elected at the 1945 general election as MP for Rossendale, at the age of 70, becoming one of only a handful of first-time MPs in their seventies. There is some possibility that he was the oldest ever first-time MP elected at a general election, but there is some uncertainty about his exact date of birth and that of a few other elderly MPs.

Walker did not stand again at the 1950 general election, when the Rossendale seat was held for Labour by Anthony Greenwood.

Parliament of the United Kingdom
Preceded by Ronald Cross	Member of Parliament for Rossendale; 1945 – 1950	Succeeded by Tony Greenwood
