= Gerald Beach Brooks, 3rd Baron Crawshaw =

Peer (1884–1946)

Gerald Beach Brooks, 3rd Baron Crawshaw (1 April 1884 – 21 October 1946) was a British nobleman. He was a member of the House of Lords from 19 January 1929 to his death, but made no contributions or speeches.

== Coat of arms ==
Coat of arms of Gerald Beach Brooks, 3rd Baron Crawshaw
Notes Coat of arms of the Brooks family Coronet A coronet of a Baron Crest A Demi Lion proper maned Argent charged on the shoulder with a Fountain and holding in the paws a Pheon in bend sinister proper stringed Or Escutcheon Argent three Bars wavy Azure a Cross Fleury Erminois in chief a Fountain Supporters Dexter: a Stag Argent; Sinister: a Horse Argent, each collared wavy Azure and suspended from the collar an Escutcheon Erminois charged with a Fountain Motto Finem Respice (Consider the end)

== Notes ==
Baronetage of the United Kingdom
Preceded by William Brooks	Baron Crawshaw; 1929–1946	Succeeded by William Brooks
