= 1892 Rossendale by-election =

UK parliamentary by-election

The 1892 Rossendale by-election was a parliamentary by-election held for the British House of Commons constituency of Rossendale in Lancashire on 23 January 1892. It was one of the most important political contests in the struggle over Irish Home Rule and a pointer to the outcome of the 1892 general election which took place in July.

== Vacancy ==
The by-election was caused by the succession to the peerage of the sitting Liberal Unionist Party MP, the Marquess of Hartington on the death of his father the Duke of Devonshire. Hartington had been the MP for Rossendale since 1885. He was elected first as a Liberal and had formerly represented a number of other constituencies. He was a former leader of the Liberal Party but split with Gladstone over the issue of Irish Home Rule and was re-elected as a Liberal Unionist in Rossendale in 1886.

== Candidates ==
=== Liberal Unionists ===
The health of the Duke of Devonshire must have been giving some cause for concern because in December 1891 the Rossendale Liberal Unionists asked their President and former chairman, Sir Thomas Brooks, to stand ready to be their Parliamentary candidate should the need occur. The Duke did not pass away until 23 December. Brooks was a retired colliery and quarry owner, with his sons now looking after the family businesses. He was a member of the Church of England.

=== Liberals ===
The Gladstonian Liberals selected John Henry Maden as their representative. Maden was only 28 years old and was a cotton spinner and manufacturer, employing local people in Bacup. He was a Wesleyan by religion.

== Issues ==
Brooks stated early that Home Rule was the political issue which he proposed to place at the forefront of his election campaign and it was generally believed that this was the question on which the outcome of the election would turn. Brooks said he favoured the extension of local government arrangements to Ireland but Maden was an advocate of an Irish Parliament with legislative and statutory powers. and believed that the tide of opinion opposing Home Rule which had swept Hartington back in as a Unionist in 1886 had now swung round in favour of the reform. Both candidates appealed to the electors as reformers on the land question and in relation to the licensing laws. Both were in favour of electoral reform on the principle of one-man-one-vote. Maden proposed disestablishment of the Anglican Church in Scotland as well as in Wales being determined to make the most of being a Methodist in a strongly nonconformist constituency.

Towards the end of the campaign the Irish question was revisited strongly when Gladstone sent a letter of support to Maden in which he made some personal attacks on Hartington for his role in the downfall of his government in 1886. Hartington, now the Duke of Devonshire, was obliged to defend himself publicly despite the convention that peers did not interfere in contests for the Commons. The letter and the reaction it provoked probably arrived too late in the campaign to affect the outcome.

== The campaign ==
=== Colours ===
Both Liberal Unionists and Liberals printed their election addresses in red, the traditional Liberal colour in the area, although Brooks’ committee room posters had to be printed in red and blue to appease the Conservative wing of the Unionist coalition. The Liberals later made play of Brooks’ election colours by issuing a placard of four colours, red, blue, green and yellow – with the words “Rossendale’s puzzle – Which is Tom’s colour?” Generally the Unionists on the campaign trail sported rosettes of patriotic red, white and blue. Both candidates had their portraits taken and distributed them to the electors and a considerable quantity of election literature was made available to voters. By the end of January it was reported that “Election literature is daily increasing in volume and letters [of support from prominent people] almost without end are pouring into the constituency”.

=== Dirty tricks ===
Both sides were accused of electioneering and ‘dirty tricks’. Maden’s supporters were accused of publishing a voting card alleging that Brooks lived in Leicester whereas Brooks’ supporters countered that people knew he had lived in Rossendale all his life. Brooks’ people were said to have spread a false rumour that Maden paid his weavers at under the going rate, whereas Maden claimed they were paid at a higher rate than the Rossendale Valley average.

=== Canvassing ===
Registration agents were brought in from neighbouring constituencies and the work of preparing canvass books was initiated in anticipation of the later constant canvassing of opinion that took place. The campaign was quite a lengthy one by the standards of the day but this was because the parties wished to allow the funeral of the old Duke of Devonshire to pass before campaigning proper got under way with the moving of the formal election writ and because of the intervention of the Christmas and New Year holidays.

=== Party mood ===
Although Hartington had held the seat at the previous election with a good majority much of that could be put down to personal factors. Brooks had however inherited an efficient political and electoral organisation, so the result was in the balance. Maden had strong local connections and had been cultivating the constituency for some time. It was reported that the Liberal mood changed during the course of the campaign from an early feeling that victory was inevitable to one of doubt over the result, whereas the Unionist spirit was on the up as the campaign progressed .

=== Supporters ===
Both candidates had the support of other local MPs and political figures from the region and outside. David Lloyd George, himself a by-election winner in 1890, was one of the MPs who came to speak for Maden. Maden also secured the defection from the Liberal Unionist camp of the Mayor of Haslingden, Mr T B Hamilton who was also a prominent nonconformist. With Rawtenstall and Crawshawbooth thought to be predominantly Unionist and Bacup solidly Liberal, the electors of Haslingden were proving to be the key constituency. In reply however Brooks secured the support of the former Mayor of Bacup, Alderman George Shepherd, who was always previously identified as a staunch Gladstonian.

=== Irish and mining voters ===
There were estimated to be up 700 voters of Irish origin in the constituency but not all would vote in favour of Home Rule and in support of Maden. In particular, Brooks’ quarry enterprises employed a large number of Irish labourers who were expected to support their employers. Maden had made of point of stating publicly that he did not expect the men who worked for him to vote for him automatically but according to their own consciences. Another key constituency were the local miners who were identified as solidly behind the Liberal cause.

=== By-election weather ===
The winter weather was not kind to the candidates, with snow falling frequently, and snow and frost causing blocked roads and other problems. This was followed by the descent of thick fog. Despite these difficulties, public meetings were apparently well attended with audiences in the range of 500-1,500 even in out of the way places. When the nomination papers were handed in on 19 January, the Unionists presented 20 papers with about 200 signatures in all. Maden’s supporters handed in 12 nomination papers but he was able to show that his papers had been signed by the Mayors of the three boroughs making up the constituency.

== Election day ==
The weather played its part on election day. A heavy mist hung over the constituency all day, only to give way in the evening to drizzling rain but for both sides there was so much at stake that there was no let up in electioneering and efforts to get supporters to the polls. This was evidently successful as it was estimated that around a 96% turnout had been achieved.

== Result ==
Unfortunately for the Liberals, Maden was unwell in the last few days of the campaign and while he was briefly able to appear in public on the morning of polling day, he could not make it to the count at the Mechanics' Institute at Bacup where at about midnight on 25 January the Returning Officer, Colonel William Foster, High Sheriff of Lancashire, announced that Maden was the winner by a majority of 1,225 votes.

Rossendale by-election, 1892
Party	Candidate	Votes	%	±%
Liberal	John Henry Maden	6,066	55.6	+13.4
Liberal Unionist	Sir Thomas Brooks	4,841	44.4	−13.4
Majority		1,225	11.2	N/A
Turnout		10,907	93.4	+11.8
Liberal gain from Liberal Unionist		Swing	+13.4	

== See also ==
- List of United Kingdom by-elections
- United Kingdom by-election records
