= William Brooks, 2nd Baron Crawshaw =

British peer (1853–1929)

William Brooks, 2nd Baron Crawshaw DL (16 October 1853 – 19 January 1929) was a British peer. He was the eldest son of Thomas Brooks, 1st Baron Crawshaw and married Mary Ethel Hicks-Beach (1853 -1 October 1914) on 12 October 1882 daughter of Sir Michael Hicks Hicks Beach, 8th Baronet (1809–1854).

== Coat of arms ==
Coat of arms of William Brooks, 2nd Baron Crawshaw
Notes Coat of arms of the Brooks family Coronet A coronet of a Baron Crest A Demi Lion proper maned Argent charged on the shoulder with a Fountain and holding in the paws a Pheon in bend sinister proper stringed Or Escutcheon Argent three Bars wavy Azure a Cross Fleury Erminois in chief a Fountain Supporters Dexter: a Stag Argent; Sinister: a Horse Argent, each collared wavy Azure and suspended from the collar an Escutcheon Erminois charged with a Fountain Motto Finem Respice (Consider the end)

== Notes ==
Peerage of the United Kingdom
Preceded by Thomas Brooks	Baron Crawshaw; 1908–1929	Succeeded by Gerald Brooks
