= David Brooks, 5th Baron Crawshaw =

British politician (born 1934)

David Gerald Brooks, 5th Baron Crawshaw (born 14 September 1934) is a British peer and politician.

== Life ==
David Gerald Brooks was born the son of Gerald Brooks, 3rd Baron Crawshaw and his wife Marjory Sheila Clifton and was educated at Eton College and the Royal Agricultural College in Cirencester.

Brooks was High Sheriff of Leicestershire for 1985–86, has been President of Leicester Conservative Association since 2001 and president of Leicestershire Agricultural Society since 2009.

After the death of his brother William Brooks, 4th Baron Crawshaw in 1997 Brooks inherited his title and a seat in the House of Lords which he took on 8 December 1998, subsequently losing it as a result of the House of Lords Act 1999. He has not since stood for re-election.

== Coat of arms ==
Coat of arms of David Brooks, 5th Baron Crawshaw
Notes Coat of arms of the Brooks family Coronet A coronet of a Baron Crest A Demi Lion proper maned Argent charged on the shoulder with a Fountain and holding in the paws a Pheon in bend sinister proper stringed Or Escutcheon Argent three Bars wavy Azure a Cross Fleury Erminois in chief a Fountain Supporters Dexter: a Stag Argent; Sinister: a Horse Argent, each collared wavy Azure and suspended from the collar an Escutcheon Erminois charged with a Fountain Motto Finem Respice (Consider the end)

Peerage of the United Kingdom
Preceded by William Brooks	Baron Crawshaw; 1997–present	Incumbent
