= Ronald Bray =

British politician (1922–1984)

Ronald William Thomas Bray (5 January 1922 – 22 April 1984) was a British Conservative politician.

Bray was Member of Parliament for Rossendale from 1970 to 1974, under Prime Minister Edward Heath, until he lost the seat to Labour's Michael Noble in the October election of that year.

Parliament of the United Kingdom
Preceded by Anthony Greenwood	Member of Parliament for Rossendale; 1970–October 1974	Succeeded by Michael Noble
