= Michael Noble (Labour politician) =

British politician

Member of Parliament for Rossendale
- In office 10 October 1974 – 7 April 1979
- Preceded by: Ronald Bray
- Succeeded by: David Trippier

Personal details
- Born: Michael Alfred Noble; 10 March 1935
- Died: 12 March 1983 (aged 48)
- Party: Labour

Michael Alfred Noble (10 March 1935 – 12 March 1983) was a British Labour Party politician.

== Early life ==
Noble was the son of Alfred "Bunny" Noble and Olive Noble (née Earle), a bricklayer and a school cook respectively. He was born in a small village near Hull. He was the first child in his school to pass the 11+ exam, and to celebrate his achievement the whole school got a day off. He attended Hull Grammar School and was a keen athlete, winning the Victor Ludorum in his senior years. He was always proud of his background, particularly of the fact that his mother insisted he continue at school beyond the minimum leaving age and worked extra hours to ensure the family could afford this, as she did for both of his younger brothers, who also followed him to the grammar school. He went to the University of Sheffield, initially intending to read geography. However, his colour blindness forced him into a change of subject, and he switched to economics.

== Teaching career ==
For his National Service, Noble chose to become a teacher and pursued this course subsequently by becoming a lecturer for the Workers' Educational Association, for whom he lectured in industrial relations. As a consequence of this career he moved from Yorkshire to Burnley in Lancashire, where his two younger children were born. He was always a supporter of the Labour Party and was elected to the local council, becoming the Chair of the Education Committee.

== Parliamentary career ==
He first stood for parliament in 1970 when he contested the Withington constituency, but was unsuccessful. He was then selected for the Rossendale constituency and, despite narrowly being defeated in the February 1974 general election, Noble was elected Member of Parliament in the October 1974 general election. He lost the seat to the Conservative candidate David Trippier in 1979.

While a Member of Parliament, Noble served as Parliamentary Private Secretary to Roy Hattersley (now Lord Hattersley), in his position as Secretary of State for Prices and Consumer Protection.

== Back to teaching ==
After losing his seat in the Conservative victory of 1979, Noble returned to his roots as an educationalist, working first for Blackburn College and then for Burnley College.

== Personal life ==
He married Brenda Peak in December 1956; their first child, Julie, was born the following December, followed in November 1963 by Gary and in January 1970 by Michelle (Shelley).

He was fanatical about sport, namely cricket and football—both of which he was qualified to coach—and it was whilst watching Burnley playing Sheffield at Turf Moor that he had his fatal heart attack, aged only 48. There had been no warnings or symptoms of any heart problems.

Parliament of the United Kingdom
Preceded by Ronald Bray	Member of Parliament for Rossendale; October 1974–1979	Succeeded by David Trippier
