= Baron Crawshaw =

Barony in the Peerage of the United Kingdom

Baron Crawshaw, of Crawshaw in the County Palatine of Lancaster and of Whatton in the County of Leicester is a title in the Peerage of the United Kingdom. It was created on 25 August 1892 for Sir Thomas Brooks, 1st Baronet. He notably served as High Sheriff of Lancashire in 1884. Brooks had already been created a baronet in the Baronetage of the United Kingdom, of Crawshaw Hall and Whatton House, on 9 February 1891. As of 2013 the titles are held by his great-grandson, the fifth Baron, who succeeded his elder brother in 1997.

The family seat is Whatton House near Loughborough in Leicestershire.

== Barons Crawshaw (1892) ==
- Thomas Brooks, 1st Baron Crawshaw (15 May 1825 – 5 February 1908)
- William Brooks, 2nd Baron Crawshaw (16 October 1853 – 19 January 1929)
- Gerald Beach Brooks, 3rd Baron Crawshaw (1 April 1884 – 21 October 1946)
- William Michael Clifton Brooks, 4th Baron Crawshaw (25 March 1933 – 7 November 1997)
- David Gerald Brooks, 5th Baron Crawshaw (born 14 September 1934)

The heir presumptive is the present holder's nephew, Edward Samuel Brooks (b. 1969).

== Coat of arms ==
Coat of arms of Baron Crawshaw
Notes Coat of arms of the Brooks family Coronet A coronet of a Baron Crest A Demi Lion proper maned Argent charged on the shoulder with a Fountain and holding in the paws a Pheon in bend sinister proper stringed Or Escutcheon Argent three Bars wavy Azure a Cross Fleury Erminois in chief a Fountain Supporters Dexter: a Stag Argent; Sinister: a Horse Argent, each collared wavy Azure and suspended from the collar an Escutcheon Erminois charged with a Fountain Motto Finem Respice (Consider the end)

Baronetage of the United Kingdom
Preceded by Rawlinson baronets	Brooks baronets of Crawshaw Hall and Whatton House; 9 February 1891	Succeeded by Quain baronets
