= David Trippier =

British politician (born 1946)

Sir David Trippier RD DL

Member of Parliament for Rossendale and Darwen Rossendale (1979–1983)
- In office 3 May 1979 – 16 March 1992
- Preceded by: Michael Noble
- Succeeded by: Janet Anderson

Personal details
- Born: 15 May 1946 (age 80)
- Party: Conservative
- Spouse: Ruth Worthington (m. 1975)
- Education: Bury Grammar School

Sir David Austin Trippier, RD, DL (born 15 May 1946) is a British Conservative Party politician and author.

== Early life ==
Trippier was born on 15 May 1946. He was educated at Bury Grammar School.

== Political career ==
Trippier fought Rochdale in a by election in 1972, coming third. In the elections in February and October 1974, he stood at Oldham West, but was beaten each time by future Labour Cabinet Minister, Michael Meacher.

He was the Member of Parliament (MP) for Rossendale from 1979 to 1983, and for Rossendale and Darwen from 1983, until he lost his seat in 1992, by 120 votes to Labour's Janet Anderson. Trippier was appointed his PPS by Kenneth Clarke while he was Minister of State for Health at the Department of Health and Social Security from 1982 to 1983.

He then served as Parliamentary Under-Secretary of State for Trade and Industry, 1983 to 1985, Parliamentary Under-Secretary of State for Employment, 1985 to 1987, Parliamentary Under-Secretary of State for the Environment, 1987 to 1989, and then Minister of State for the Environment and Countryside at the Department of the Environment from 1989 to 1992.

== Later life ==
He was knighted after he lost his seat in the House of Commons, and appointed High Sheriff of Lancashire for 1997. He subsequently became the Deputy Chairman of the Conservative Party's Northern Board. He married barrister Ruth Worthington in 1975.

== Freemasonry ==
He was initiated in to Freemasonry in 1968, at the age of 21. In 2011, he became the Provincial Grand Master for the Masonic Province of East Lancashire. He was invested on 22 February 2012. He retired as Provincial Grand Master on 18 November 2021.

Parliament of the United Kingdom
Preceded by Michael Noble	Member of Parliament for Rossendale; 1979–1983	constituency abolished
New constituency	Member of Parliament for Rossendale and Darwen; 1983–1992	Succeeded by Janet Anderson
