= Jimmy Dickinson (footballer, born 1899) =

English footballer

Personal information
- Full name: James Dickinson
- Date of birth: 11 November 1899
- Place of birth: Crawshawbooth, England
- Date of death: 1971 (aged 71–72)
- Position: Wing half

Senior career*
Years	Team	Apps	(Gls)
- Royal Navy
1919–1925	Plymouth Argyle	137	(1)
1925–192?	Wigan Borough	0	(0)
1925–1926	Rossendale United	36	(7)
1926–1927	Norwich City	16	(0)
- * Club domestic league appearances and goals

James Dickinson (11 November 1899 – 1971) was an English professional footballer who played in the Football League for Plymouth Argyle and Norwich City. He played as a wing half.

Dickinson was born in Crawshawbooth, Lancashire. After service in the Royal Navy he joined Plymouth Argyle, then a Southern League club, in 1919, and went on to make 141 appearances for the club in all competitions, 111 of which were in the Football League. Dixon played in Argyle's first game in the Football League, as the Southern League Division One clubs were absorbed to form the Football League Third Division for the 1920–21 season, and was involved in the buildup to their first Football League goal, scored by Jimmy Heeps. He played his last game for Argyle in November 1924, and then returned to Lancashire, where he joined Wigan Borough, though without appearing in their Football League side, and then non-League club Rossendale United. He finished his Football League career with 16 games for Norwich City in the 1926–27 season. Dickinson died in 1971.
