= 1900 Rossendale by-election =

UK parliamentary by-election

The 1900 Rossendale by-election was a parliamentary by-election held for the British House of Commons constituency of Rossendale in Lancashire on 13 February 1900.

== Vacancy ==
The by-election was caused by the resignation of the sitting Liberal MP, John Henry Maden who had represented Rossendale since himself being returned in a by-election in 1892. Later, Maden would briefly return to Parliament as Rossendale's MP between 1917 and 1918 when he would win the seat at a by-election 17 years later to the day and hold it until the 1918 general election.

Maden announced late in 1899 that he wished to resign as Rossendale's Member of Parliament. The local Liberal Association met in December 1899 and passed a motion regretting Maden's resignation, asking him to stay on until the next general election and authorising the search for a new candidate. Maden was unwilling to wait for the next general election however and it was clear that political differences had developed between Maden and his local party. He put out a statement in January 1900 placing the blame for his resignation on the officers of the Rossendale Liberal Council and their demands that he devote more time and, crucially, more of his own income to the constituency and its financial support. He specifically rejected the argument that he was tired of Parliament, which was probably true since he chose to return there at the by-election in Rossendale in 1917. He also denied that he had in any way fallen out of sympathy with the principles of Liberalism. In late January he sought an appointment as Steward and Bailiff of the Manor of Northstead, a traditional device for resigning MPs.

There was clearly some bad blood between Maden and the local Liberal establishment however as when the time came Maden refused to sign the nomination paper of the Liberal candidate in the by-election and he refused to appear in support of the candidate during the election, leading to accusations of his being ‘the spoilt baby of politics.’

== Candidates ==
=== Liberals ===
The Rossendale Liberals first chose Alderman Trickett, chairman of the Rossendale Liberal Council and a prominent local slipper manufacturer, as their candidate and it was reported that he had accepted the offer. However, before long the Liberals had formally adopted another man, William Mather. Mather was the chairman of an engineering company and had previously been the Liberal MP for Salford and for Manchester Gorton. He was formally adopted at a meeting on 3 February 1900.

=== Unionists ===
The Liberals had an expectation that the by-election would be uncontested as Maden had been returned unopposed at the 1895 general election and had polled heavily in 1892. However the Conservatives decided to fight the seat and on 1 February selected as their candidate Dr. George Kingsbury, a medical doctor who was the Mayor of Blackpool. Kingsbury apparently fought a good campaign and while his chances were rated very low at the outset of the election, he gained many independent plaudits for his performance at the hustings. He also had the advantage that Mather was unable to visit the constituency during most of the contest as he was unwell in St. Moritz. After the election, he was told by his doctors that he needed at least six weeks rest before conducting any sort of business.

=== Others ===
No other candidates came forward to contest the election.

== Issues ==
Mather issued an election address soon after his adoption as candidate in which he highlighted what he saw as the most important political questions of the day; the need for improved methods of national education, Irish Home Rule and he cautiously raised the issue of the government's role in the outbreak and conduct of the war in South Africa. Kingsbury also focussed his attention on the war in support of the government's position, saying that the main issue before the electors of Rossendale was one of patriotism against party. It was noted that the local sentiment was generally pro-war and when Kingsbury read out a telegram of support from another MP expressing the hope that Rossendale would, like other places, ‘help our soldiers at the front’ it was received with great enthusiasm. Liberals too were divided on the question of the war, although it was doubted voters would desert the party on the issue and Mather was probably more anti-war than he chose to admit in public.

== Result ==
Although snow lay on the ground on election day, placing difficulties on party workers and electors, the day was a fine one and, while the turnout was said to be down on recent elections, Mather held the seat for the Liberals with a majority broadly consistent with previous elections.

William Mather

Rossendale by-election, 1900
Party	Candidate	Votes	%	±%
Liberal	William Mather	5,936	56.5	N/A
Conservative	George Kingsbury	4,564	43.5	New
Majority		1,372	13.0	N/A
Turnout		10,500	86.4	N/A
Liberal hold		Swing	N/A	

== See also ==
- List of United Kingdom by-elections
- United Kingdom by-election records
