= West Pennine =

West Pennine is a ward within the borough of Blackburn with Darwen, represented by three borough councillors. It was created in May 2018 when areas of the former wards of North Turton with Tockholes, East Rural, and Whitehall were merged as part of a Boundary Commission review. West Pennine encompasses a number of rural villages, including Belmont, Chapeltown, Edgworth, Hoddlesden, and Eccleshill alongside parts of Whitehall in Darwen. Landmarks include Winter Hill and Turton Tower.

The ward is represented by three elected Councillors, and the three current incumbents are all members of the Conservative Party.

== Election Results ==
=== Elections in the 2010s ===
Blackburn with Darwen Borough Council election, 2018
Party	Candidate	Votes	%	±%
Conservative	Julie Helen Slater	1540	22.16%	
Conservative	Colin Rigby	1411	20.31%	
Conservative	Jean Rigby	1369	19.70%	
Labour	Matt Jackson	702	10.1%	
Labour	Jude Rowley	697	10.0%	
Labour	David Hollings	648	9.33%	
Liberal Democrats	John East	581	8.36%	
Spoilt Ballots		36	0.52%	
Turnout		2721	43.87	
