= Loveclough =

Hamlet in Lancashire, England

Coordinates: 53.741°N 2.287°W

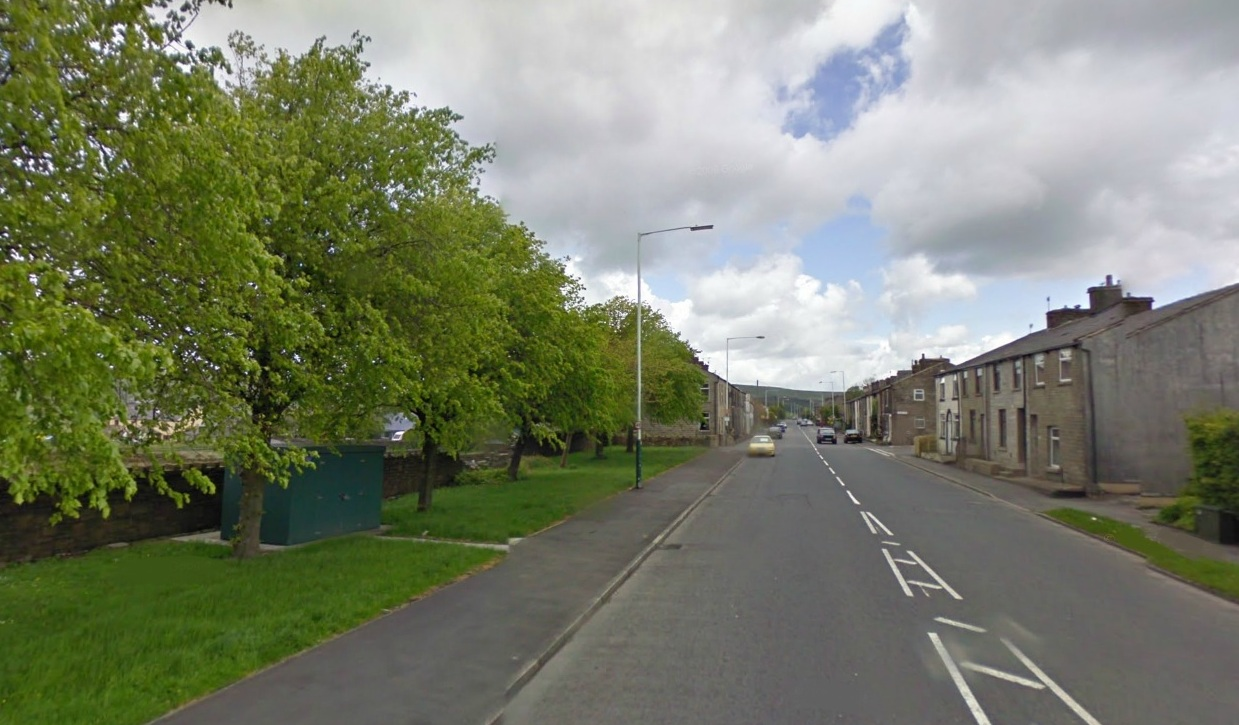
- Entering Loveclough from Crawshawbooth

- Location within Rossendale Location within Lancashire
- OS grid reference: SD810272
  - London: 225 miles
- District: Rossendale
- Shire county: Lancashire
- Region: North West
- Country: England
- Sovereign state: United Kingdom
- Post town: ROSSENDALE
- Postcode district: BB4
- Dialling code: 01706
- Police: Lancashire
- Fire: Lancashire
- Ambulance: North West
- UK Parliament: Rossendale and Darwen

Loveclough /ˈlʌf.klʌf/ is a small hamlet at the edge of the Rossendale Valley, in Lancashire, England, near Crawshawbooth and Rawtenstall, 20 miles north of Manchester, 21 miles east of Preston, and 44 miles south east of Lancaster.

== Governance ==
Loveclough is part of the Rossendale and Darwen parliamentary constituency and the Borough of Rossendale.

== Geography and tourism ==
On the edge of the Pennines, various wildlife can be seen in the area, as well as lakes and rivers, such as the Limy Water, a tributary of the River Irwell which it joins in Rawtenstall.

== Transport ==
Loveclough is served by the X43 Witch Way bus service to Rawtenstall, Burnley and Manchester.

== Gallery ==
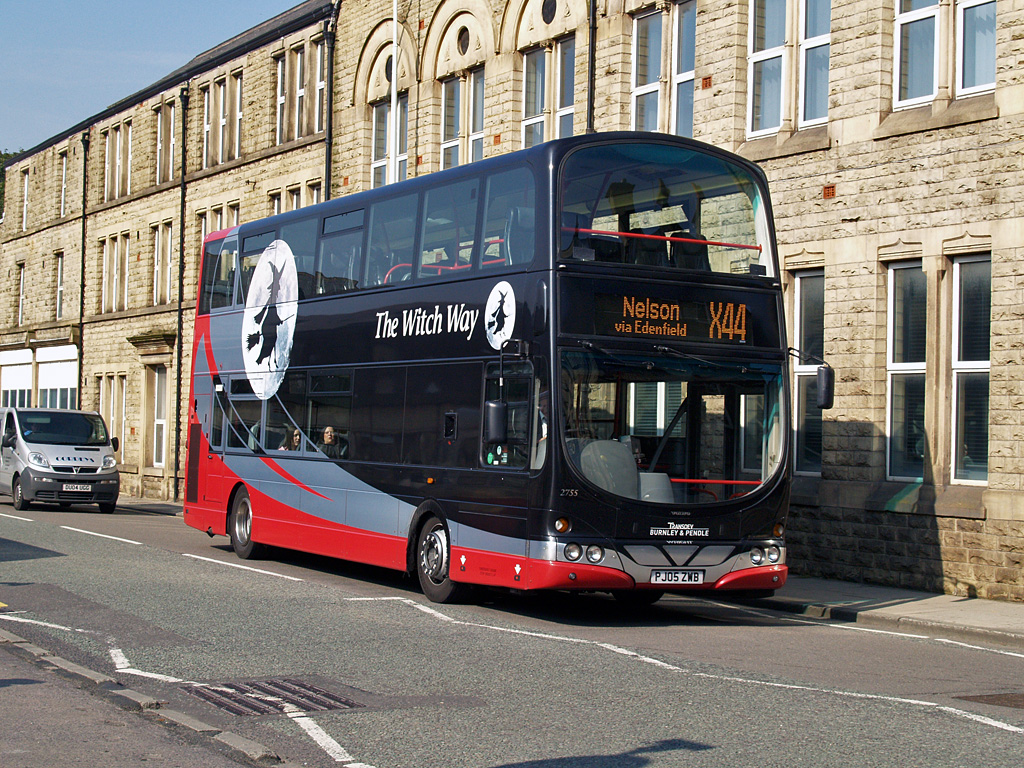
Burnley & Pendle bus 2755 on route X44 at Rawtenstall, the ones they use en route through the village

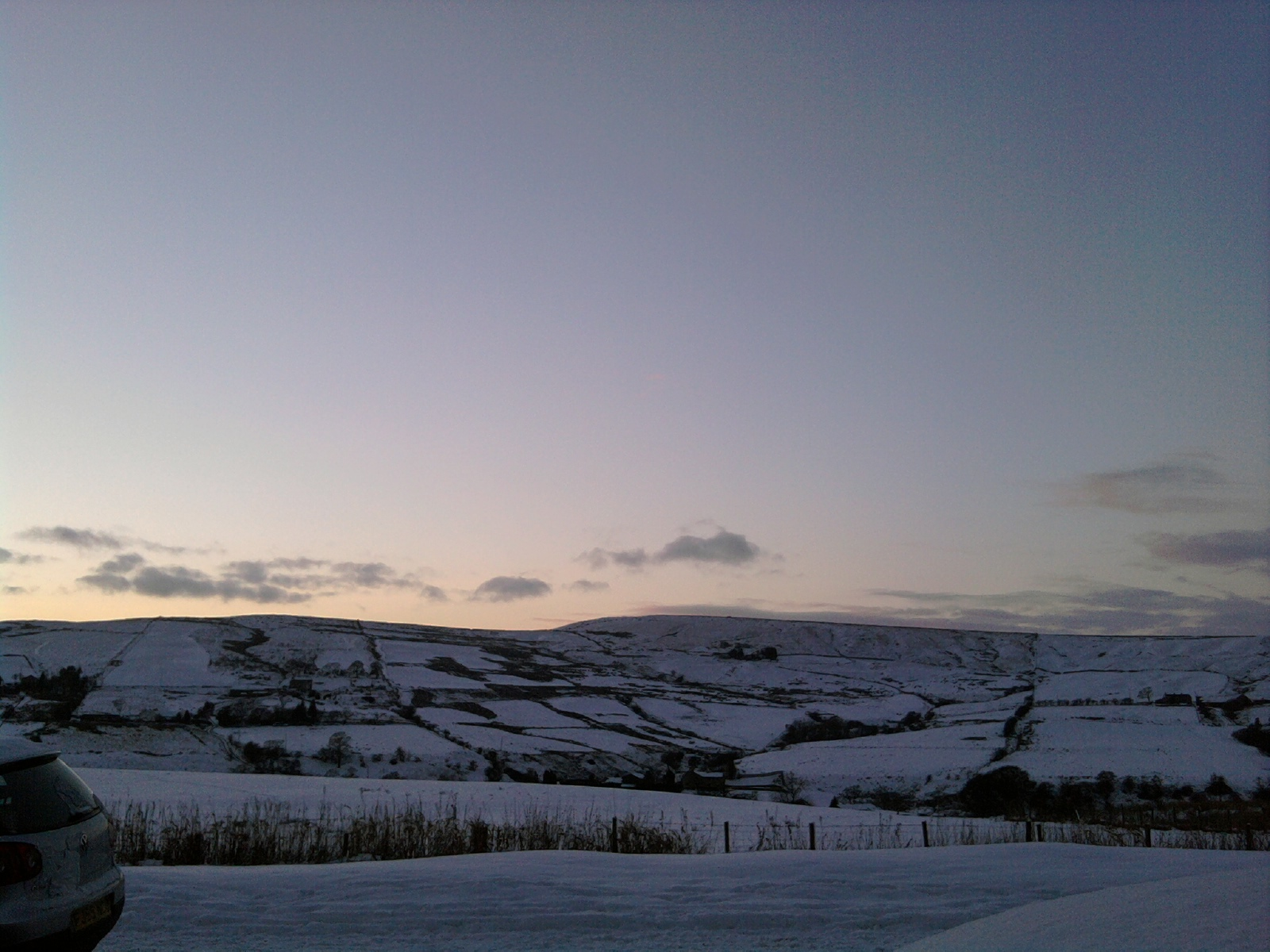
Loveclough to the west during January 2011, showing its role as a beauty location
