= Rossendale Union of Boot, Shoe and Slipper Operatives =

English trade union from 1895-1997

- Merged: National Union of Knitwear, Footwear and Apparel Trades
- Founded: 1895
- Dissolved: 1997
- Headquarters: 7 Tenterfield Street, Rossendale
- Location: England
- Members: 9,527 (1945)
- Affiliations: TUC, GFTU, ISLWF

The Rossendale Union of Boot, Shoe and Slipper Operatives was a trade union representing workers in the footwear trade in the Rossendale area of Lancashire.

The union was founded in 1895, Initially, it restricted membership to the workers perceived as being the most skilled, the lasters and riveters, but gradually expanded to represent all workers in the trade in the area.

Membership of the union reached a peak of 9,527 in 1945, but declined to only 1,412 in 1995. In 1997, it merged with the National Union of Knitwear, Footwear and Apparel Trades.

== General Secretaries ==
1895: Andrew McAuley
1896: John Jordan
1905: J. Eastwood
1907: Albert Taylor
1947: Robert Driver
1969: Tom Whittaker
1983: Michael Murray
