= Crawshawbooth =

Village in the Pennines, England

Coordinates: 53.724°N 2.286°W

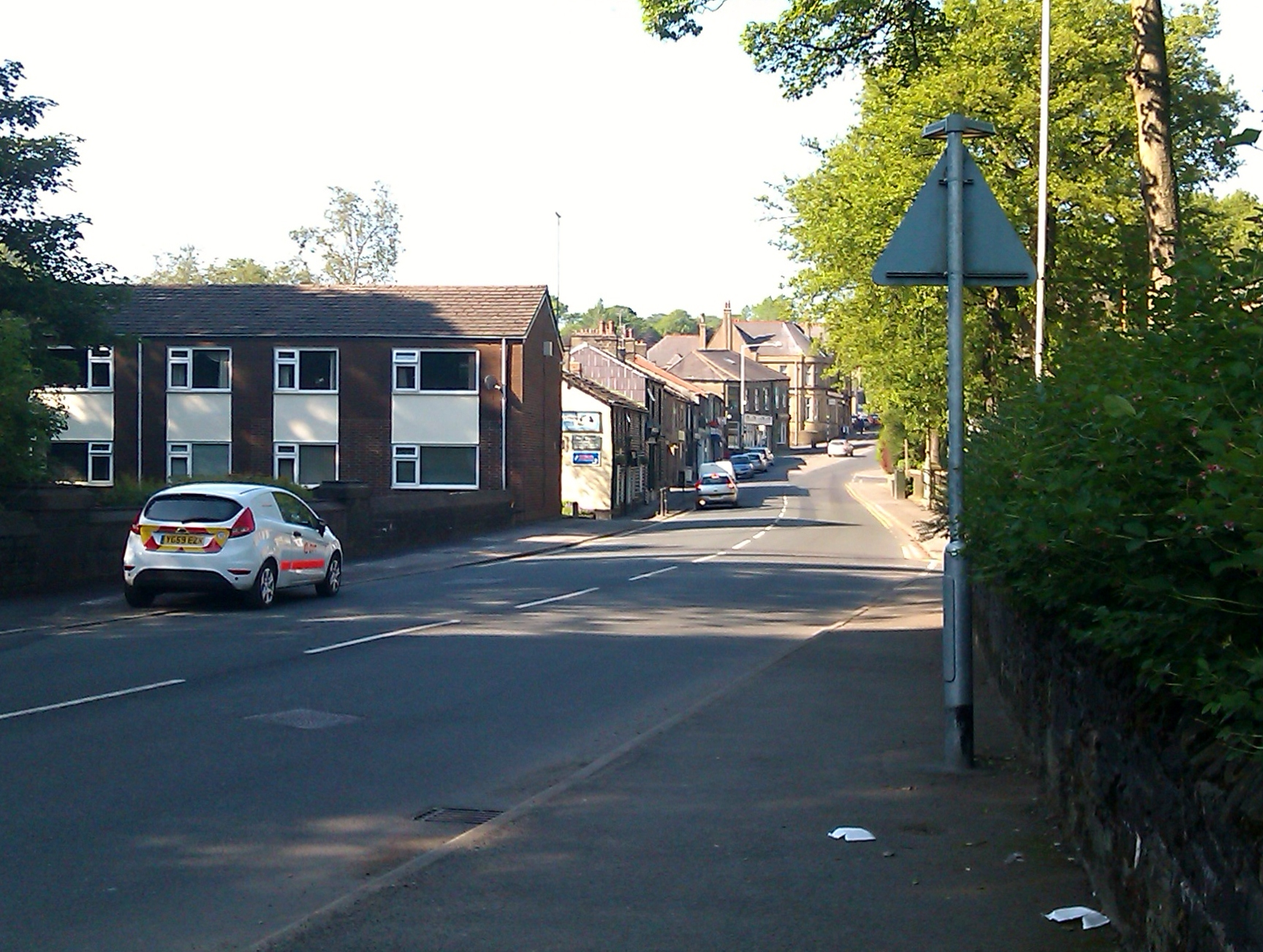
- Entering Crawshawbooth from Rawtenstall, 2011

- Location within Rossendale Location within Lancashire
- OS grid reference: SD810254
- District: Rossendale
- Shire county: Lancashire
- Region: North West
- Country: England
- Sovereign state: United Kingdom
- Post town: Rossendale
- Postcode district: BB4
- Dialling code: 01706
- Police: Lancashire
- Fire: Lancashire
- Ambulance: North West
- UK Parliament: Rossendale and Darwen

Crawshawbooth is a small village located on the edge of the Pennines in England, just north of the market town of Rawtenstall, Lancashire, and south of Loveclough. It is situated in the Rossendale Valley, which was once an ancient royal hunting ground. The majority of the surrounding land consists of farms and moorland.

== Toponymy ==
The name "Crawshawbooth" is derived from two elements: "Crawshaw" and "booth".

The first element, "Crawshaw", refers to a family name associated with the village. It is believed that the name originates from the Old English words "crawe" meaning "crow" and "sceaga" meaning "grove" or "woodland". Over time, the name evolved and eventually became associated with the area.

The second element, "booth", refers to a small dwelling or temporary shelter historically used by farmers or traders. This term reflects the village's historical connection to the agricultural and trading activities that took place in the region.

The combination of "Crawshaw" and "booth" signifies the historical presence of a dwelling or settlement belonging to the Crawshaw family.

== Geography ==
Crawshawbooth is located within the Rossendale Valley, an area known for its scenery and history. The village is surrounded by farmland and stretches of moorland.

The topography of Crawshawbooth is characterised by rolling hills, giving rise to panoramic views of the surrounding countryside. The area is crisscrossed by footpaths and trails, making it a destination for walkers and outdoor enthusiasts. The village is also intersected by several small rivers and watercourses, including Limy Water and the Folly Clough.

== History ==
There are a number of English Heritage properties in the Crawshawbooth area.

Crawshaw Hall is a Grade II* listed mansion built in 1831 by John Brooks, a local calico printer and quarry owner. His son Sir Thomas Brooks was created a baronet in 1891 and the following year raised to the peerage as Baron Crawshaw. Sir Thomas was appointed High Sheriff of Lancashire for 1884–85. The property descended in the Brooks family until it was sold in 1976. It has been a medical centre and nursing home since 1987.

The Religious Society of Friends (Quakers) Meeting House in the village is one of the oldest in the world (it was built in 1716). The village has many historical aspects such as Victorian-style housing and huge chimneys from the early Victorian Era. There was also a large cotton and shoe making industry in the Victorian Era.

Goodshaw Chapel was associated with the Larks of Dean.

St. Mary and All Saints Church, commonly known as "Goodshaw Chapel", dates from 1542. Over the years, it underwent several renovations, with notable work carried out in 1780 and 1828. This stone church features a rectangular structure with a small western turret housing a single bell. It offers seating for 912 individuals, including 357 free seats. The church's historical records include baptisms dating from 1732, marriages from 1838, and burials from 1755.

St. John the Evangelist's Church, Crawshawbooth was constructed in 1892 at a cost of £12,000. Originally a chapel of ease for St. Mary's, it has a seating capacity for 600 worshippers. The church was designed by the architects Paley and Austin. It currently is in disrepair and abandoned for the foreseeable future.

== Amenities ==
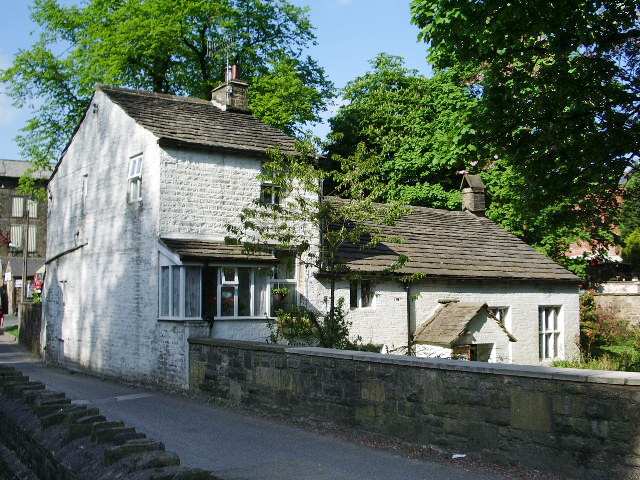
Friends Meeting House, Crawshawbooth

The village is home to Crawshawbooth Primary School, which is situated outside of the main village. Other amenities include several shops and restaurants. These include a fish and chip shop, an Indian restaurant, a Chinese takeaway, and an Italian restaurant. Additionally, there are three pubs, a newsagents, a dry cleaner, and a public library. The village is also known for its butchers.

The main road in the village is lined with a number of Victorian houses. The towns of Rawtenstall and Burnley are nearby, as is the hamlet of Loveclough.

Crawshawbooth was also home to the See Gallery who mounted exhibitions of local nationally and internationally known artists including, amongst others, Ray Lowry, Liam Spencer and Dave Pearson.

== Transport ==
As of March 2026, 1 bus route serves the village. The X43 Witchtway to Burnley or Manchester. The bus service is operated by the Burnley Bus Company.

== Notable residents ==
- Raleigh Croshaw (ca.1584–1624), an English merchant and immigrant to the Colony and Dominion of Virginia
- Thomas Brooks, 1st Baron Crawshaw (1825–1908), a British peer, son of a quarry owner
- Marshall Brooks (1855–1944), sportsman, high jump champion, rugby union international and JP
- Jimmy Dickinson (1899–1971), footballer with almost 200 club caps
- Ted Robbins (born 1955), a comic, actor, TV presenter and radio broadcaster
- Phil Neville (born 1977), footballer with Manchester United, Everton and the England national team
- Thomas Hamer (born 1998), swimmer

== See also ==
- Listed buildings in Rawtenstall
