= Thomas Brooks, 1st Baron Crawshaw =

British Baron

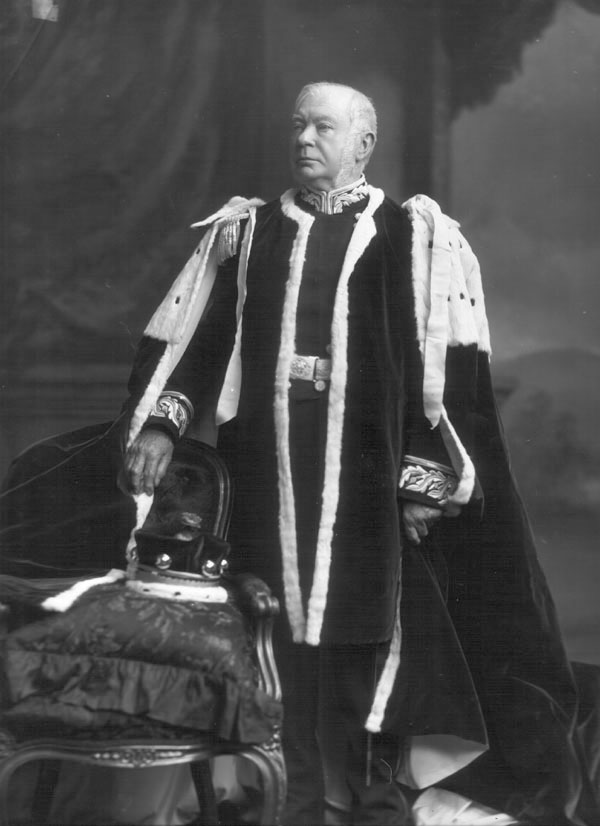
Lord Crawshaw dressed in coronation robes, 1902

Thomas Brooks, 1st Baron Crawshaw, DL (15 May 1825 – 5 February 1908) was a British peer.

Brooks was the son of John Brooks, a quarry owner, of Crawshaw Hall, Lancashire. He served as High Sheriff of Lancashire in 1884. In 1891 he was created a Baronet, of Crawshaw Hall in the County of Lancaster, and in 1892 he was raised to the peerage as Baron Crawshaw, of Crawshaw in the County of Lancaster.

1892 Rossendale by-election
Party	Candidate	Votes	%	±%
Liberal	John Maden	6,066	55.6	+13.4
Liberal Unionist	Thomas Brooks	4,841	44.4	−13.4
Majority		1,225	11.2	N/A
Turnout		10,907	93.4	+11.8
Registered electors		11,679		
Liberal gain from Liberal Unionist		Swing	+13.4	

Lord Crawshaw died in February 1908, aged 82, and was succeeded in his titles by his son William Brooks, 2nd Baron Crawshaw. His younger son, Marshall, was a skilled sportsman, having been British Amateur High Jump champion in 1874 and 1876, world record holder for the High Jump on three occasions, as well as having represented England in rugby union in 1874.

== Coat of arms ==
Coat of arms of Thomas Brooks, 1st Baron Crawshaw
Notes Coat of arms of the Brooks family Coronet A coronet of a Baron Crest A Demi Lion proper maned Argent charged on the shoulder with a Fountain and holding in the paws a Pheon in bend sinister proper stringed Or Escutcheon Argent three Bars wavy Azure a Cross Fleury Erminois in chief a Fountain Supporters Dexter: a Stag Argent; Sinister: a Horse Argent, each collared wavy Azure and suspended from the collar an Escutcheon Erminois charged with a Fountain Motto Finem Respice (Consider the end)

Peerage of the United Kingdom
New creation	Baron Crawshaw; 1892–1908	Succeeded by William Brooks
Baronetage of the United Kingdom
New creation	Baronet (of Crawshaw Hall and Whatton House); 1891–1908	Succeeded by William Brooks
