= Albert Taylor (trade unionist) =

British trade unionist and political activist

Albert Taylor (15 October 1877 – 1947) was a British trade unionist and political activist.

Living in Bacup, Taylor was a shoemaker, and in 1895 he was a founder member of the Rossendale Union of Boot, Shoe and Slipper Operatives, and soon became its part-time general secretary, becoming full-time in 1909. He was also a supporter of socialism, joining the Social Democratic Federation, and attending the founding conference of the Labour Representation Committee.

Taylor opposed World War I, and was a conscientious objector, although he served on the Rawtenstall Tribunal until late 1916, when he was removed over the protests of the local labour movement. He was offered an exemption from being called up if he could find work of national importance. He refused to do so, and in January 1917, he was called up.

At this time, Taylor was a candidate in the 1917 Rossendale by-election, describing his campaign as "Peace by Negotiation". He was a member of the British Socialist Party, but also received the support of the No Conscription Fellowship, and individuals including Charles Roden Buxton, R. C. Wallhead, and J. H. Standring, who acted as his election agent. He failed to report for duty, and on 30 January, he was arrested, receiving extensive publicity. The Manchester Guardian stated that "if Mr Taylor had had the arrangement of the time-table himself he could not have managed it more to his own advantage as a candidate". He was sentenced to sixty days in prison, but refused to undertake compulsory work while there, and ultimately served 112 days, the large majority in solitary confinement at Wormwood Scrubs, surviving on bread and water. He ultimately took 1,804 votes, 23.1% of the total cast.

After the war, Taylor's profile as a trade unionist increased. He represented his union at the Trades Union Congress for 26 consecutive years, was elected to the Management Committee of the General Federation of Trade Unions, and was the organisation's president for 1943 and 1944. While president, he argued that a programme of nationalisation would remove a major cause of war. He died in 1947, still in office.

Trade union offices
Preceded by J. Eastwood	General Secretary of the Rossendale Union of Boot, Shoe and Slipper Operatives; 1907–1947	Succeeded by Robert Driver
Preceded by John Lee	President of the General Federation of Trade Unions; 1942–1944	Succeeded by Horace Moulden
