= 1917 Rossendale by-election =

UK parliamentary by-election

The 1917 Rossendale by-election was a parliamentary by-election held for the British House of Commons constituency of Rossendale on 13 February 1917.

== Vacancy ==
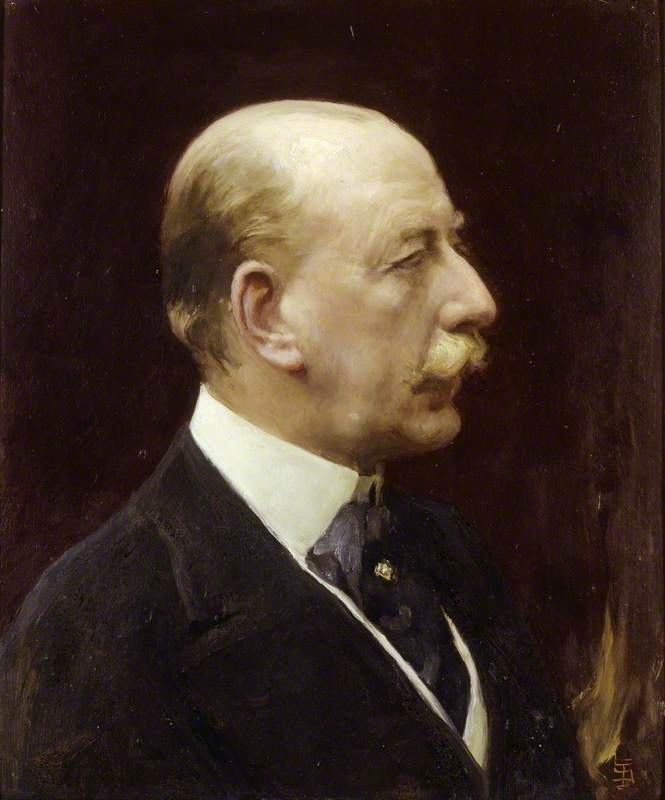
Lewis Harcourt

John Maden

The by-election was caused by the elevation to the peerage of the sitting Liberal MP, Lewis Harcourt as the first Viscount Harcourt of Stanton Harcourt in Oxfordshire. Harcourt had himself been elected as MP for Rossendale in a by-election in 1904.

== Candidates ==
The Rossendale Liberal Council selected as their candidate 54 year-old Sir John Maden. Maden had been the local MP from 1892 until 1900 when he stood down. Maden was the current mayor of Bacup and a cotton manufacturer by trade. The Unionists being partners in the wartime coalition government of David Lloyd George did not oppose Maden but an organisation called the British Citizen Party indicated they would stand a candidate in the election.

In the end at a special meeting of Socialists and representatives of organised labour at Waterfoot, Lancashire it was agreed to run a Labour candidate on a peace ticket. The meeting chose 39 year-old Albert Taylor, the secretary of the Rossendale Union of Boot, Shoe and Slipper Operatives. Taylor was a conscientious objector but had been exempted from combatant service on condition he agree to undertake other work of national importance. He declined to do this.

== Issues ==
There were no domestic or local issues of any importance in the by-election. Maden had stated publicly that he would not raise any such questions, saying that personal opinions on ‘minor matters’ had no place on the hustings and that he stood simply on the platform of supporting the present, or any other government, which worked to bring the then-called Great War to a successful conclusion. He did hold a public meeting in Bacup on 10 February 1917 but the centre piece of the event was his reading a telegram from H. H. Asquith supporting his candidacy as part of a united front to win the war.

Taylor stood as a peace party candidate. His description in the press was ‘Peace by Negotiation’ candidate. However on 30 January 1917 he was fined £2 for refusing to do non-combatant military service and was detained. This did not prevent his nomination as a candidate but it did mean he was unable to campaign in the by-election, being in the custody of the military authorities.

== Result ==
Maden was re-elected as Liberal MP for Rossendale in support of the government coalition with a comfortable majority over Taylor. Coincidentally, the election was 17 years to the day from the by-election caused by his previous resignation.

Rossendale by-election, 1917
| Party | Candidate | Votes | % | ±% |
|---|---|---|---|---|
| Liberal | John Maden | 6,019 | 76.9 | N/A |
| Independent | Albert Taylor | 1,804 | 23.1 | New |
| Majority | | 4,215 | 53.8 | +41.8 |
| Turnout | | 7,823 | 57.2 | −32.3 |
| Liberal hold | | Swing | | |

== See also ==
- List of United Kingdom by-elections
- United Kingdom by-election records
