= John Maden =

British politician (1862–1920)

Maden in 1895.

Sir John Henry Maden JP (11 September 1862 – 18 February 1920) was a British Liberal Party politician. He was elected member of parliament for Rossendale in 1892, resigning in 1900 by becoming Steward of the Manor of Northstead. He was again reelected for Rossendale in a 1917 by-election, and retired from politics when he lost his seat in the 1918 general election.

Maden was the head of the firm of John Maden & Sons, cotton spinners and manufacturers of Bacup and Manchester. He was an honorary freeman of Bacup of which he had been mayor thirteen times in all, eleven times in succession. He served as High Sheriff of Lancashire in 1914 and was knighted the following year. He was also a justice of the peace.

Parliament of the United Kingdom
Preceded by Marquess of Hartington	Member of Parliament for Rossendale; 1892–1900	Succeeded by Sir William Mather
Preceded by Lewis Harcourt	Member of Parliament for Rossendale; 1917–1918	Succeeded by Robert Waddington
