= Rossendale and Darwen =

UK Parliament constituency (since 1983)

Coordinates: 53.708°N 2.240°W

- Borough constituency for the House of Commons
- Interactive map of boundaries since 2024
- Location within North West England
- County: Lancashire
- Electorate: 74,593 (March 2020)
- Major settlements: Darwen, Rawtenstall and Bacup

Current constituency
- Created: 1983
- Member of Parliament: Andy MacNae (Labour)
- Seats: One
- Created from: Rossendale, Darwen and Heywood & Royton

Rossendale and Darwen is a constituency (Note: A county constituency (for the purposes of election expenses and type of returning officer)) in Lancashire represented in the House of Commons of the UK Parliament since 2024 by Andy MacNae of the Labour Party. (Note: As with all constituencies, the constituency elects one Member of Parliament (MP) by the first past the post system of election at least every five years.)

== Constituency profile ==
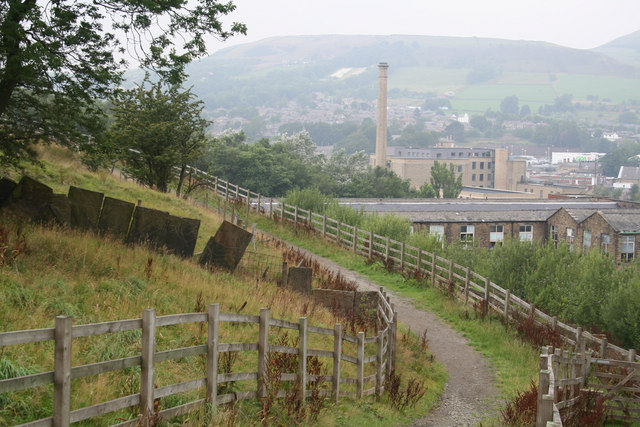
Rawtenstall within Rossendale Valley

Rossendale and Darwen is a constituency in Lancashire in North West England, covering parts of the Rossendale and Blackburn with Darwen boroughs. It is named after Darwen, its largest town with a population of around 29,000, and the Rossendale Valley which makes up the eastern half of the constituency. Other settlements include the towns of Rawtenstall, Bacup and Whitworth and the villages of Lower Darwen, Helmshore and Newchurch.

This constituency contains formerly-industrial towns and villages lying within valleys of the Pennines. Most of their growth came during the Victorian era when, like much of Lancashire, the area was a significant centre for textile manufacturing, especially cotton spinning. Other industries like shoemaking and coal mining were also present. This area was affected by the deindustrialisation of the late 20th century and today the towns of Darwen and Bacup are highly-deprived. Rawtenstall has average levels of wealth and the rural villages are generally affluent, giving the constituency an average level of wealth overall. Most residents live in dense terraced housing built to accommodate industrial workers, or in semi-detached properties. The average house price is lower than the rest of North West England and around half the UK average.

Residents of Rossendale and Darwin have a similar age profile to the rest of the country with a slightly lower proportion of young adults. They have average levels of income and above-average rates of homeownership. The child poverty rate is in line with the rest of the country. Residents have average levels of education and a high proportion work in the manufacturing and retail sectors. The percentage claiming unemployment benefits is similar to the overall UK figure. White people made up 94% of the population at the 2021 census.

Most of the constituency is represented by the Labour Party at the local council level, with some Green Party councillors elected in Newchurch and some Reform UK councillors elected at more recent elections. Voters in Rossendale and Darwen strongly supported leaving the European Union in the 2016 referendum; an estimated 60% voted in favour of Brexit compared to the UK-wide figure of 52%.

== Boundaries ==
=== Historic ===
Map of boundaries from 2010 to 2024

1983–1997: The Borough of Rossendale, and the Borough of Blackburn wards of Earcroft, Marsh House, North Turton, Sudell, Sunnyhurst, and Whitehall.

1997–2010: All the wards of the Borough of Rossendale except the Greenfield and Worsley wards, and the Borough of Blackburn wards of Earcroft, Marsh House, North Turton, Sudell, Sunnyhurst, and Whitehall.

2010–2024: The Borough of Rossendale wards of Cribden, Eden, Facit and Shawforth, Goodshaw, Greensclough, Hareholme, Healey and Whitworth, Helmshore, Irwell, Longholme, Stacksteads, and Whitewell, and the Borough of Blackburn with Darwen wards of Earcroft, East Rural, Fernhurst, Marsh House, North Turton with Tockholes, Sudell, Sunnyhurst, and Whitehall.

Darwen Ward Changes At the 2018 local elections the Darwen electoral wards were changed and renamed. They are now known as Darwen West, Darwen East, Darwen South and West Pennine. The parliamentary boundaries also included parts of the new Blackburn South and Lower Darwen, and Ewood wards.

=== Current ===
Under the 2023 review of Westminster constituencies (based on the local authority ward structures in place on 1 December 2020), the constituency was subject to minor changes to align with the revised ward boundaries in Blackburn with Darwen. There were no changes to the boundaries within Rossendale.

Taking into account a local government boundary review in Rossendale which came into effect in May 2024, the constituency now comprises the following from the 2024 general election:

- The Borough of Blackburn with Darwen wards of: Blackburn South & Lower Darwen; Darwen East; Darwen South; Darwen West; West Pennine.
- The Borough of Rossendale wards or part wards of: Bacup; Britannia & Lee Mill; Goodshaw & Cribden; Greenfield & Eden (part); Hareholme & Waterfoot; Helmshore (most); Longholme; Whitewell & Stacksteads; Whitworth.

== History ==
This constituency was created in 1983 and has alternated between the two largest parties' MPs during this time; since 1997 the constituency has been a bellwether of the national result.

== Members of Parliament ==
Election	Member	Party
1983	David Trippier	Conservative
1992	Janet Anderson	Labour
2010	Jake Berry	Conservative
2024	Andy MacNae	Labour

== Elections ==
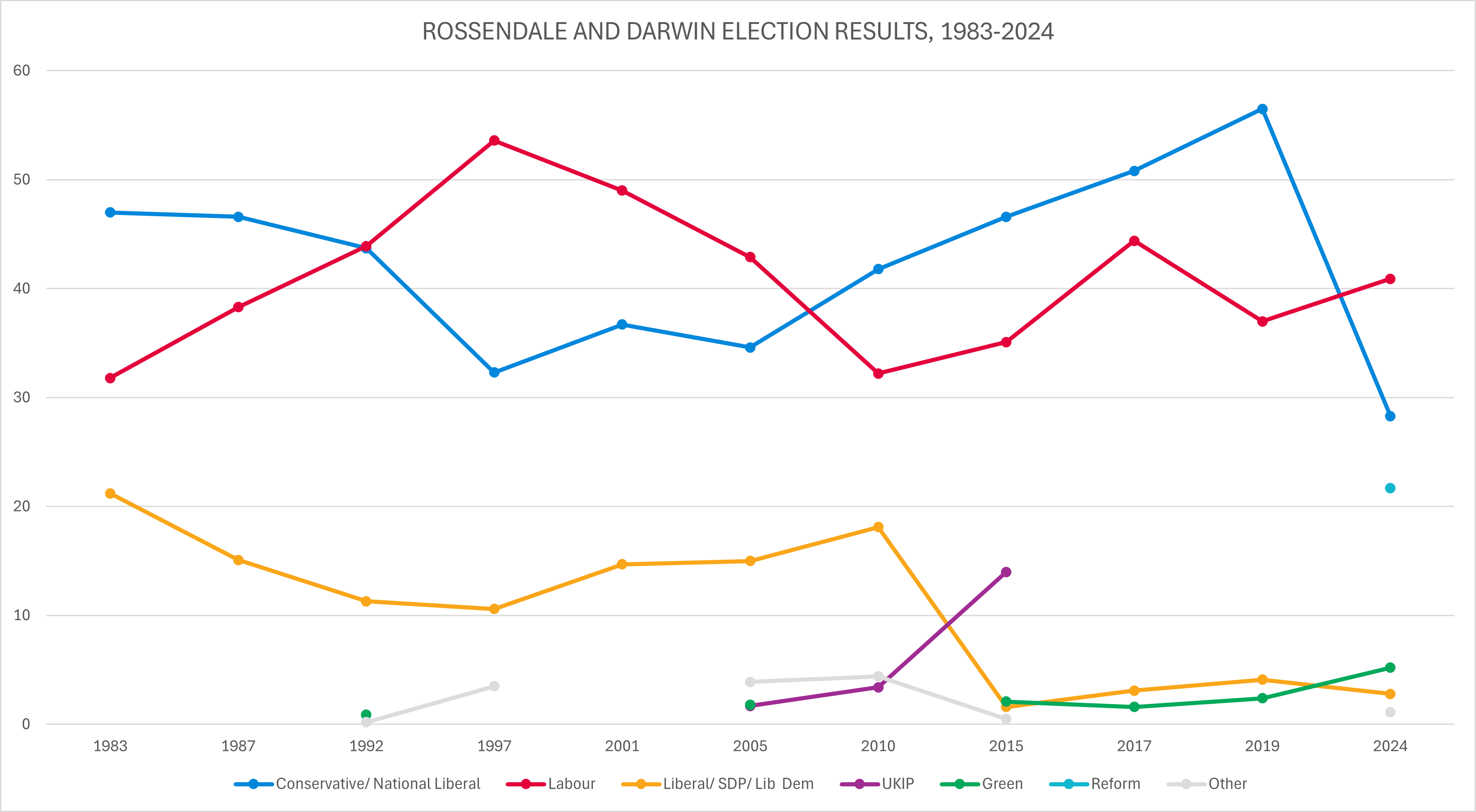
Election results 1983-2024

=== Elections in the 2020s ===
General election 2024: Rossendale and Darwen
Party	Candidate	Votes	%	±%
Labour	Andy MacNae	18,247	40.9	+4.3
Conservative	Jake Berry	12,619	28.3	−28.0
Reform	Daniel Matchett	9,695	21.7	+21.3
Green	Bob Bauld	2,325	5.2	+2.7
Liberal Democrats	Rowan Fitton	1,241	2.8	−1.4
Workers Party	Tayub Ali	491	1.1	N/A
Majority		5,628	12.6	N/A
Turnout		44,618	59.8	−7.3
Labour gain from Conservative		Swing	+16.2	

=== Elections in the 2010s ===
General election 2019: Rossendale and Darwen
Party	Candidate	Votes	%	±%
Conservative	Jake Berry	27,570	56.5	+5.7
Labour	Alyson Barnes	18,048	37.0	―7.4
Liberal Democrats	Paul Valentine	2,011	4.1	+1.0
Green	Sarah Hall	1,193	2.4	+0.8
Majority		9,522	19.5	+13.1
Turnout		48,822	67.1	―2.1
Conservative hold		Swing	+6.5	

General election 2017: Rossendale and Darwen
Party	Candidate	Votes	%	±%
Conservative	Jake Berry	25,499	50.8	+4.2
Labour	Alyson Barnes	22,283	44.4	+9.3
Liberal Democrats	Sean Bonner	1,550	3.1	+1.5
Green	John Payne	824	1.6	―0.5
Majority		3,216	6.4	―5.1
Turnout		50,156	69.2	+2.8
Conservative hold		Swing	―2.6	

General election 2015: Rossendale and Darwen
Party	Candidate	Votes	%	±%
Conservative	Jake Berry	22,847	46.6	+4.8
Labour	Will Straw	17,193	35.1	+2.9
UKIP	Clive Balchin	6,862	14.0	+10.6
Green	Karen Pollard-Rylance	1,046	2.1	New
Liberal Democrats	Afzal Anwar	806	1.6	―16.5
Independent	Kevin Scranage	122	0.2	New
TUSC	Simon Thomas	103	0.2	New
Northern	Shaun Hargreaves	45	0.1	New
Majority		5,654	11.5	+2.0
Turnout		49,024	66.4	+1.8
Conservative hold		Swing	+1.0	

General election 2010: Rossendale and Darwen
Party	Candidate	Votes	%	±%
Conservative	Jake Berry	19,691	41.8	+7.1
Labour	Janet Anderson	15,198	32.2	―10.7
Liberal Democrats	Robert Sheffield	8,541	18.1	+3.2
UKIP	David Duthie	1,617	3.4	+1.8
National Front	Kevin Bryan	1,062	2.3	New
English Democrat	Michael Johnson	663	1.4	New
Impact	Tony Melia	243	0.5	New
Independent	Mike Siveri	113	0.2	New
Majority		4,493	9.5	N/A
Turnout		47,128	64.6	+3.0
Conservative gain from Labour		Swing	+8.9	

=== Elections in the 2000s ===
General election 2005: Rossendale and Darwen
Party	Candidate	Votes	%	±%
Labour	Janet Anderson	19,073	42.9	―5.9
Conservative	Nigel Adams	15,397	34.6	―1.7
Liberal Democrats	Mike Carr	6,670	15.0	+0.3
BNP	Anthony Wentworth	1,736	3.9	New
Green	Kenneth McIver	821	1.8	New
UKIP	David Duthie	740	1.7	New
Majority		3,676	8.3	―4.4
Turnout		44,437	61.5	+2.8
Labour hold		Swing	―1.9	

General election 2001: Rossendale and Darwen
Party	Candidate	Votes	%	±%
Labour	Janet Anderson	20,251	49.0	―4.6
Conservative	George Lee	15,281	36.7	+4.5
Liberal Democrats	Brian Dunning	6,079	14.7	+4.1
Majority		4,970	12.7	―8.6
Turnout		41,358	58.7	―14.3
Labour hold		Swing	―4.3	

=== Elections in the 1990s ===
General election 1997: Rossendale and Darwen
Party	Candidate	Votes	%	±%
Labour	Janet Anderson	27,470	53.6	+9.7
Conservative	Patricia Buzzard	16,521	32.3	―11.4
Liberal Democrats	Brian Dunning	5,435	10.6	―0.7
Referendum	Roy Newstead	1,108	2.2	New
BNP	Andrew Wearden	674	1.3	New
Majority		10,949	21.3	+21.1
Turnout		51,208	73.0	―10.0
Labour hold		Swing	+10.6	

General election 1992: Rossendale and Darwen
Party	Candidate	Votes	%	±%
Labour	Janet Anderson	28,028	43.9	+5.6
Conservative	David Trippier	27,908	43.7	―2.9
Liberal Democrats	Kevin Connor	7,226	11.3	―3.8
Green	James Gaffney	596	0.9	New
Natural Law	Peter Gorrod	125	0.2	New
Majority		120	0.2	N/A
Turnout		63,883	83.0	+2.7
Labour gain from Conservative		Swing	+4.2	

=== Elections in the 1980s ===
General election 1987: Rossendale and Darwen
Party	Candidate	Votes	%	±%
Conservative	David Trippier	28,056	46.6	―0.4
Labour	Janet Anderson	23,074	38.3	+6.5
Liberal	Peter John Hulse	9,097	15.1	―6.1
Majority		4,982	8.3	―6.9
Turnout		60,227	80.3	+2.5
Conservative hold		Swing	―3.5	

General election 1983: Rossendale and Darwen
Party	Candidate	Votes	%	±%
Conservative	David Trippier	27,214	47.0	
Labour	Christopher Robinson	18,393	31.8	
Liberal	Michael Taylor	12,246	21.2	
Majority		8,821	15.2	
Turnout		57,853	77.8	
Conservative win (new seat)				

== See also ==
- List of parliamentary constituencies in Lancashire
