= Robert Waddington (politician) =

British politician

Sir Robert Waddington (13 December 1868 – 25 June 1941) was a British manufacturer and Conservative MP for Rossendale.

Educated at St Mary’s School, Rawtenstall, Waddington was a cotton spinner and manufacturer. He won the seat in 1918, stood down in 1922, won it again in 1923, and stood down again in 1929. He was knighted in 1937.

During the Second World War, he was Controller of Dyestuffs from 1939 until his death two years later.

== Sources ==
- Historical list of MPs^{[usurped]}
- Craig, F.W.S. British Parliamentary Election Results 1918-1949
- Whitaker's Almanack 1919 to 1929 editions
