= List of collieries in Lancashire since 1854 =

The Lancashire Coalfield was one of the most prolific in England. The number of shafts sunk to gain coal number several thousand, for example, in 1958, Wigan undertook a survey of old shafts and located 500. In 1995 following several years of redevelopment across the Wigan Metropolitan Borough by the British Geological Survey (BGS), in association with the planning consultants Roger Tym & Partners, the list had grown to over 1000 with no real idea of the total. Similar surveys in Bolton and Manchester have also produced long lists of undocumented shafts.

The proliferation of mines resulted from its accessibility at the start of the Industrial Revolution and the climate which was ideal for cotton mills. Coal fed the boilers of the cotton mill towns of Ashton-under-Lyne, Blackburn, Bolton, Burnley, Bury, Darwen, Oldham and Rochdale as well as the Rossendale Valley. The first industrial revolution coal mines supplied coal locally and to Liverpool, along the River Mersey via the Sankey Canal. On the Manchester Coalfield, the early collieries were those of the Duke of Bridgewater in Worsley, where the Bridgewater Canal was built to transport coal from his mines to Manchester.

Lancashire miners used terms in different ways to other coal mining areas. A mine in Lancashire refers to a coal seam, so the Doe mine refers to the Doe seam. The term pit was used for the shaft sunk to access the mine and the term colliery was used to describe the whole of the surface area including the headgear, wash-houses, offices, trams etc. An example is: Garswood Hall Colliery consisting of three pits: the number 9, the number 2 and the number 3 working the Ravin, Orrell Four Foot and Arley mines.

In 1880, the Mines Inspector reported 534 coal pits in the Lancashire field. In 1947 when the industry was nationalised, there were 108 collieries Parkside Colliery in Newton le Willows was the last pit to be sunk in Lancashire, production started in 1960 and was the last to close in 1993.

The list has been compiled from the official reports of the Mines Inspector and lists of mines produced by National Coal Board and the Coal Authority.

The list gives the name of the pit which by convention did not usually use the word pit after it followed by the location and date of closure if known, e.g. Chadderton, Chadderton is the Chadderton Pit located in Chadderton.

== Bolton area ==
=== Blackrod ===
- Anderton Hall,
- Arley,
- Blackrod, later became No. 1) Blackrod No 2, Blackrod No 4
- Bull Ring,
- Dark Lane,
- King Coal,
- Marklands,
- Park Hall,
- Scott Lane,
- Victoria Main,

=== Bolton ===
- Breightmet, Breightmet
- Brinsop, Lostock
- Burnden, Bolton
- Cheetham Close, Bolton
- Doffcocker, Halliwell,
- Gibraltar, Lostock
- Higher Croft, Breightmet
- Little, Bolton
- Parsonage, Bolton
- Quarlton, Quarlton
- Rose Hill,*Burnden
- Smithills, Halliwell
- Tonge, Tonge/Bolton
- Tonge Fold, Bolton
- Tonge Moor, Bolton
- Turton Moor, Turton - shown disused 1908
- Victoria, Rumworth
- Walker Fold, Bolton
- Westhoughton New, Lostock

=== Farnworth and Kearsley ===
- Clammerclough, Farnworth
- Doe, Kearsley
- Farnworth, Farnworth
- Kearsley, Farnworth
- Kearsley Moss, Kearsley
- Little Hey, Kearsley
- Little Hey Pumping, Kearsley
- Lords Moss, Farnworth
- Manor, Kearsley
- Machine, Farnworth
- Nob End Bell Pits, Kearsley
- Lords Moss Field, Farnworth
- Scowcrofts, Kearsley
- Spindle Point, Kearsley
- Stoneclough, Kearsley
- Stonehill,*Farnworth
- Tonges Field, Farnworth
- Unity Brook, Kearsley

=== Harwood ===
- Great Harwood, Great Harwood
- Harwood, Harwood
- Hill End, Harwood

=== Horwich and Rivington ===
- Montcliffe, Horwich
- New Fields, Horwich
- Rivington Moor, Rivington
- Willows, Horwich
- Wildersmoor, Horwich (mainly fireclay)
- Winter Hill, Horwich - shown abandoned 1908

=== Middle and Over Hulton ===
- Bank House, Middle Hulton
- Chequerbent Arley,*Over Hulton
- Chequerbent Yard, Over Hulton
- Chequerbent Three Quarters, Over Hulton
- Deep Halt Yard, Over Hulton
- Three Quarter, Over Hulton
- Yard, Over Hulton

=== Darcy, Great and Little Lever ===
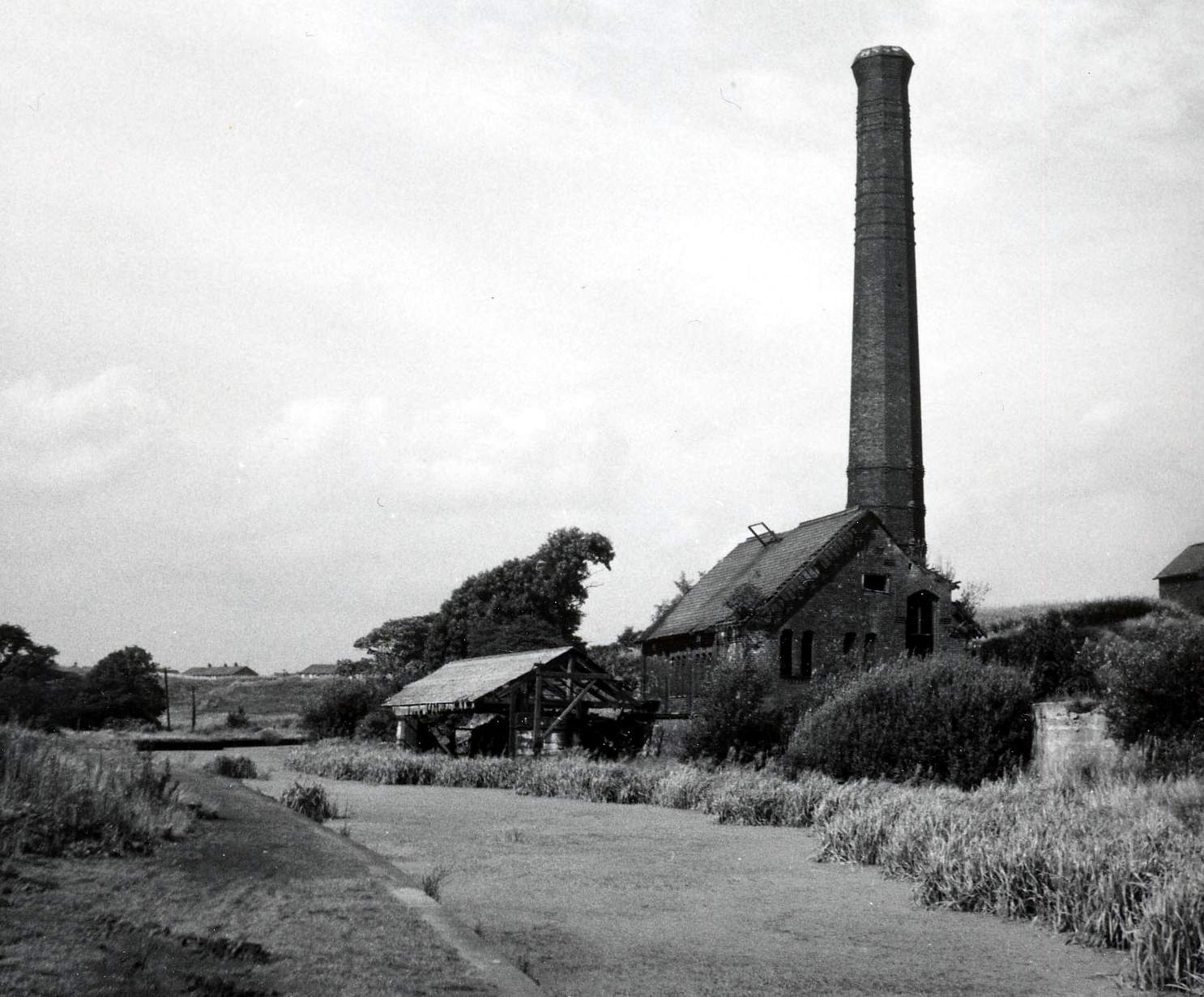
Ladyshore Colliery, 1968

- Croft Side and Victoria, Darcy Lever
- Darcy Lever, Darcy lever
- Davenport, Darcy Lever
- Foggs, Darcey Lever
- Hacken, Darcy Lever
- Snow Hill, Darcy Lever
- Top o' th' Lane, Darcy Lever
- Victoria, Darcy Lever
- Five Quarter, Great Lever, Bolton
- Gravel Hole, Great Lever
- Great Lever, Great lever
- Lever Bridge, Great Lever
- Raikes, Great Lever
- Bally, Little Lever
- Bents, Little Lever
- Dingle, Little Lever
- Farnworth Bridge, Little Lever
- Farnworth Bottom, Little Lever
- Harpurfold, Little Lever
- Ladyshore, Little Lever
- Back o'th Barn, Little Lever - (later renamed Ladyshore)
- Little, Little Lever
- Middle Bents, Little Lever
- New Rivin, Little Lever
- Owl Hole, Little Lever
- Victoria, Little Lever
- Riven, Little Lever
- Stopes, Little Lever

=== Westhoughton ===
- Albert
- Brinsop Hall
- Brinsop Hall Arley
- Brinsop Yard
- Brookside
- Bugle Horn
- Cow Lee Lane
- Eatock No 1 & 2
- Hewlet
- Hilton House
- Hulton (also known as the Pretoria Pit) - closed 1934
- Lostock Lane
- Pretoria (also known as Hulton Colliery) - closed 1934
- Snydale Hall
- Starkie
- Westhoughton Nos 4, 6 & 7 - Nos 6 & 7 shown abandoned 1908

== Bury, Bacup and Radcliffe ==
=== Bacup ===
- Bank Top
- Blackclough Arley
- Blue Ball, Brandwood
- Broadclough
- Brook Side
- Clough Head, Sharneyford - listed as abandoned 1938
- Clough Head Clay, Sharneyford
- Deansgreave
- Deerplay
- Dinely
- Freeholds
- Greave, Brandwood
- Green's Moor, Brandwood
- Hogshead, Whitworth
- Hill Top, Sharneyford, 1948-1966 and 1997-2014
- Hoyle Hey, Brandwood
- Inchfield Moor
- Lee Moor
- Lower Mountain
- Meadows
- New Line
- Old Clough
- Old Meadows (Newchurch in list)
- Old Sink, Rooley Moor
- Parrocks
- Rooley Moor, Rooley Moor
- Sheephouse Clough

=== Birtle ===
- Birtle
- Birtle Dean
- Bowling Green
- Openshaw
- Smethurst Hall
- Thorney Hurst

=== Bury ===
- Affetside, Tottington
- Ainsworth, Red House Ainsworth
- Clough Side, Prestwich
- Cob House, Birtle
- Dark Lane, Walmsbury
- Elton, Elton
- Fern Hill, Bury
- Higher Hill, Shuttleworth
- Hunger Hill, Rooly Moor
- Lumb, Birtle
- New Hey, Brandwood
- Oaken Clough, Brandwood
- Old Hey, Brandwood
- Pilsworth, Pilsworth
- Railway, Ainsworth
- Sand Rock, Walmersley
- Scout Moor, Shuttleworth
- Shipper Bottom, Walmersley
- Snape Hill, Walmersley
- Tooter Hill, Brandwood
- Woodgate Hill

=== Radcliffe ===
- Allens Green (with Green Lane)
- Bank Top
- Black Moss
- Canal Side
- Cockey Moor
- Coney Green
- Green Lane
- Hampson Meadow
- Hay Side
- Holcombe, Holcombe Hill
- Openshaw Fold
- Outwood No 2, Outwood
- Outwood No 4, Outwood
- Radcliffe Bridge
- Ringley, Outwood - shown disused 1908
- Stand Lane
- Whitaker Bridge
- Withins Lane
- Wolstenholdfold

== Leigh area ==
=== Astley ===
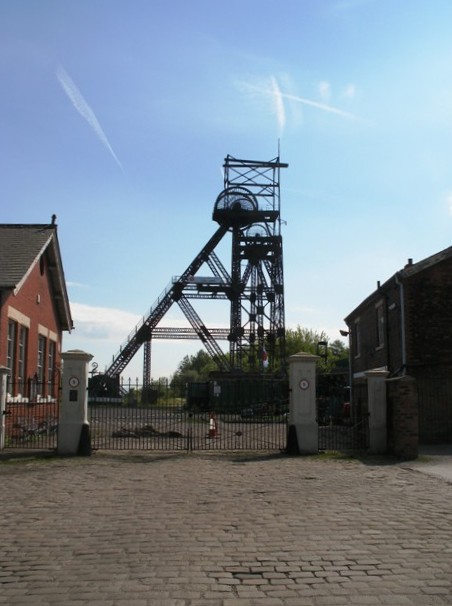
Astley Green Colliery Museum

- Astley Green Colliery -Sinking 1908, Closed 1970
- Cross Hillock opened after 1866, closed 1887
- Gin Pit Colliery
- Nook Colliery Nook Nos 2, 3 and 4, had four shafts.

=== Atherton ===
- Atherton
- Chanters Colliery, Hindsford - Closed 1966 Chanters No 2 Closed 1966
- Crumbuke, Howe Bridge - Closed 1907
- Fan
- Gibfield Colliery Arley - Closed 1963
- Howe Bridge Colliery - Closed 1959
- Lovers Lane - Closed 1898
- Victoria

=== Hindley ===
- Albion
- Amberswood
- Deep
- Hindley Green
- Hindley Hall
- Ladies Lane Nos 1, 2 and 4
- Low Hall
- Stangeways Hall

=== Leigh and Golborne ===
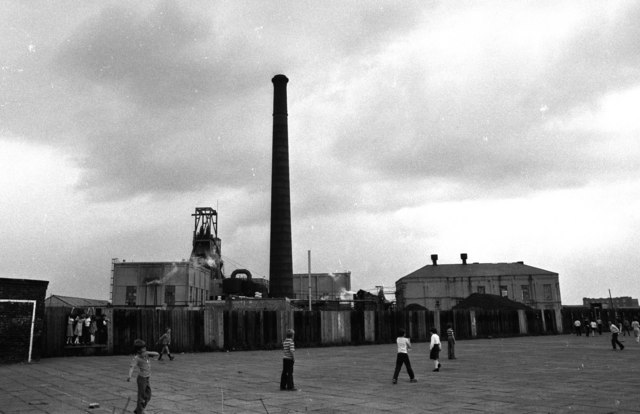
Parsonage Colliery, Leigh 1980

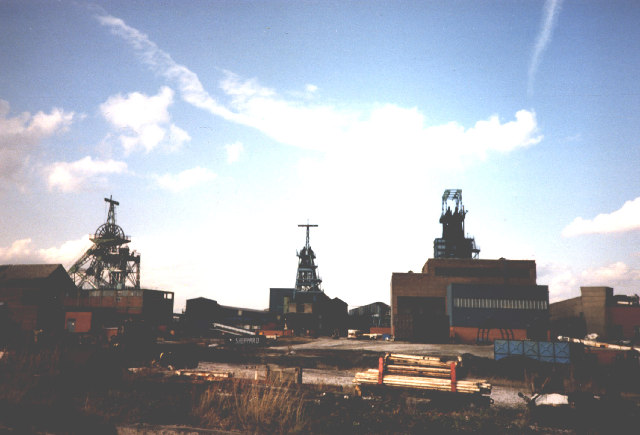
Bickershaw Colliery 1990

- Bedford Colliery, Bedford, sinking 1874, Bedford No 3. closed 1967
- Edge Green, Golborne
- Golborne Golborne Nos 1 and 2, Golborne
- Hindley Field, Golborne
- Lilly Lane, Golborne
- Bank Field, Westleigh
- Bickershaw Colliery No 1, Leigh - Closed 1992 Bickershaw had multiple shafts: Nos 2, 3 and 4, No 5, Also known as Plank Lane - Closed 1992
- Broadfield, Westleigh
- Hearts o' th' meadow, Westleigh
- Heyfield, Westleigh
- Lower Hall Nos. 1 & 2 Westleigh
- Park, Westleigh
- Parsonage Colliery No 1 Parsonage No 2
- Pickley Heys, Westleigh
- Priestners Nos 1 & 2, Westleigh
- Snapes, Westleigh
- Springfield, Westleigh
- Westleigh
- Westleigh Lane

=== Tyldesley ===
- Cleworth Hall Colliery Nos 1, 2 and 3 sunk 1874
- Combermere Colliery - opened 1878, closed 1893 shown disused 1908
- Ellenbrook
- Fan
- Gatley, New Manchester
- Great Boys Colliery
- Messhing Trees Renamed Wellington Pit, Shakerley
- Nelson
- New Lester No 1 & No 2
- Peel
- Peelwood Colliery
- Shakerley - listed as abandoned 1938
- St George's Colliery Nos 2 and 3
- Tyldesley
- Wharton Hall No 1, Nos 2 & 3
- Yew Tree Colliery

== Manchester and Salford ==
=== Ashton-under-Lyne and Stalybridge ===
- Ashton Moss, Ashton-under-Lyne (known locally as Snipe) - Closed 1959
- Broad Oak, Ashton-under-Lyne
- Charlestown, Ashton-under-Lyne
- Hartshead, Ashton-under-Lyne
- Heys, Ashton-under-Lyne
- Higher Mill, Stalybridge
- Hurst Knowl, Ashton-under-Lyne
- Limehurst, Ashton-under-Lyne
- Lords Field, Ashton-under-Lyne
- Snipe, Ashton-under-Lyne (properly named Ashton Moss) - Closed 1959

=== Little Hulton ===
- Arley Deep, Over Hulton
- Ashton's Field, Little Hulton
- Ashton's Field Pumping Station, Little Hulton
- Bank, Little Hulton
- Barracks, Little Hulton
- Brackley 1 & 2, Middle Hulton
- Brackley Day eye, Middle Hulton
- Charlton 1 & 2, Little Hulton
- Delph, Middle Hulton
- Hanging Bank, Little Hulton
- Little, Little Hulton
- Peel Hall Nos 1,2 & 3, Little Hulton
- Smithfold, Little Hulton
- Streetgate, Little Hulton
- Watergate, Middle Hulton

=== Manchester ===
- Bradford Colliery, Bradford, Manchester - Closed 1968
- Bradford Fireclay, Bradford, Manchester - Closed 1968
- Burton Nook, Denton
- Broomstair, Denton
- Clayton, Clayton
- Denton, Denton - flooded during the 1926 miners strike, never reopened, closed 1939/40
- Great Wood, Denton
- Moston, Newton Heath
- Oak Victoria, Audenshaw
- Top Pit, Denton
- Victoria, Denton

=== Pendlebury, Clifton and Pendleton ===
- Agecroft Colliery, Pendlebury (later became 1 & 2) 3 & 4, Pendlebury Closed 1991
- Botany Bay, Clifton
- Clifton, Clifton
- Clifton Hall, Clifton Closed 1929
- Clifton Moss, Clifton
- Kearsley, Clifton, Salford
- Moorside, Moorside
- New Town Nos 1, 2 and 3 Clifton
- Pendlebury Colliery, Pendlebury
- Pendleton Colliery Nos 1 & 2, Pendleton
- Robin Hood, Clifton
- Springwell, Clifton
- Timber Yard, Clifton
- Wet Earth, Clifton - Closed 1928
- Wet Earth Drift, Clifton - Closed 1928

=== Worsley ===
- Bridgewater 1, 2, 3 & 4 Worsley Renamed Sandhole Colliery Nos 1, 2, 3, & 4, Worlsey
- Worsley Navigable Levels, Worsley
- Edge Fold, Worsley
- Ellesmere, Worsley Ellesmere Nos 1, 2 and 3
- Linnyshaw Colliery 1 & 2, Worsley
- Mangnalls, Worsley
- Mesne Lea, Worsley
- New Watergate, Little Hulton
- Sanderson, Worsley
- Wardley Coppice Field, Wardley
- Worsley, Worsley

== Burnley area ==
- Altham, Altham
- Altham Moorfields, Altham
- Aspen, Oswaldtwistle
- Baitings, Wolstenholme
- Bamford Closes, Wolstenholme
- Bank Hall, Burnley - Closed 1971
- Bank Moor, Oswaldtwistle
- Barclay Hills, Burnley
- Barrowshaw, Barrowshaw
- Baxenden, Baxenden
- Bee Hole, Burnley
- Bell Isle, Tinnicliffe
- Belthorn, Yate - shown disused 1908
- Birkacre, Birkarce
- Blackburn, Whitebirk
- Bog Farm, Darwen
- Brandlewood Moor, Stacksteads
- Brassey Mine, Dulesgate
- Brex, Newchurch, Rossendale
- Broadfield, Accrington
- Broadoak & Tagclough, Accrington
- Brookside, Accrington
- Broad Oak Nook, Hurst
- Bunkers Hill, Stacksteads
- Burnley Drift, Burnley
- Burnt Hills, Clowbridge
- Calder, Altham
- Carr & Cleggs, Portsmouth
- Chapel, Green
- Charnock, Charnock
- Cheesden, Lumb
- Chorley, Chorley
- Clayton, Clayton-le-Moors
- Clifton, Burnley - Closed 1955
- Cliviger, Cliviger
- Clough Head, Todmorden
- Coney, Over Darwen
- Copy, Cliviger
- Coppy Clough and Park, Church
- Cornfield, Padiham
- Cranberry Moss, Darwen
- Cupola, Clowbridge
- Count Hill, Higher Barrowshaw
- Dean, Newchurch in Rossendale
- Deanwood Clay, Portsmouth
- Dearnley, Smallbridge
- Dewhurst, Baxendale
- Dodbottom, Cliviger
- Dogshaw, Over Darwen
- Duckworth Hall, Oswaldtwistle
- Dunkenhalgh Park, Church
- Duxbury Park, Chorley
- Eccleshill, Darwin
- Ellison Fold, Over Darwen
- Elpit Edge, Butterfield
- Flash, Eccleshill
- Fordoe, Wolstenholme
- Foulclough, Todmorden
- Freeholds, Whitworth Haigh
- Fulledge, Burnley
- Gambleside, Crawshaw Booth
- Gannow, Habergham
- Goodshaw Hill, Rawtenstall
- Great Harwood, Accrington
- Green Clough Merril Head Farm, Cliviger
- Grime Bridge, Lumb in Rossendale (CURRENT)
- Grime Bridge, Newchurch
- Grime Bridge No 2, Newchurch
- Gristlehurst, Heywood
- Farnworth House, Duxbury
- Habergham, Habergham, Burnley
- Hades Farm, Wardle
- Handle Hall, Calderbrook
- Hapton, Hapton
- Hapton Valley, Hapton - Closed 1981
- Hauch Hey, Butterworth
- Heapy, Heapy Chorley
- Helm Clough, Stacksteads
- Heskin Hall, Heskin
- Hewlett No 1, West Loughton
- Hewlett No 2, West Loughton
- Hoddlesden, Hoddlesden - listed abandoned 1938
- Hoddlesden No 12, Hoddlesden
- Holland Moor and No 2, Burnley
- Hole House, Cliviger
- Hole in Bank, Baxendale
- Horse Pasture, Towneley Side, Burnley
- Houghton Barn, Altham
- Hugh Mill, Waterfoot
- Huncoal, Huncoat
- Hurstwood, Cliviger
- Knotts, Hapton
- Laund, Baxendale
- Knowl, Wolstenholme
- Lancashire & Yorkshire, Thorne Lees
- Laund, Baxendale
- Lee, Brandwood Moor
- Livsey, Blackburn
- Lostock Valley, Chorley
- Lower Barn, Over Darwen
- Lower Darwin, Lower Darwin
- Lower East Knowle, Wolstenholme
- Meadow Head, Wolstenholme
- Midgelden Pastures, Dulesgate
- Martholme, Great Harwood
- Miller Fold, Accrington
- Nabb, Dean nr Newchurch
- Padiham, Padiham
- Part Banks, Waterfoot
- Paulden, Barrowshaw
- Pemberton House, Charnock Richard
- Portsmouth, Cliviger
- Princess, Eccleshill
- Railway, Cliviger
- Railway, Baxendale
- Rawlinson Bridge, Heath Charnock
- Red Walls Oswaldtwistle
- Reedley, Burnley
- Rishton, Rishton
- Rowley, Burnley
- Scaitliffe, Accrington
- Simonstone, Burnley
- Smear Hall, Ray with Botton
- Stacksteads, Stacksteads
- Stacksteads Top, Stacksteads
- Stonehill, Oswaldtwistle
- Swinshaw, Crawshaw Booth
- Taylors Green, Darwin (mainly fireclay)
- Tithebarn, Over Darwin
- Todmorden Moor, Dulesgate
- Towneley Arley, Burnley
- Towneley Demesne, Towneley
- Towneley Drift, Towneley
- Trawden, Trawden
- Marsden, Marsden, Burnley Closed 1873
- Marsh House, Over Darwen
- Martholme, Great Harwood
- Meadow Head, Wolstenholme - shown as abandoned 1908
- Miller Fold, Accrington
- Moorfields, Altham
- Moor Road,*Chorley
- Moorside, Altham
- Nabb, Dean nr Newchurch
- New Altham, Altham
- Nook, Oswaldtwistle
- Old Clough, Newchurch
- Old Lyons,*Darwin - shown disused 1908
- Padiham, Padiham
- Pole Over, Darwen
- Pole Lane, Sough
- Preistbooth, Dulesgate
- Ranglet, Chorley
- Red Earth Drift, Yate
- Red Lumb, Wolstenholme
- Red Walls, Oswaltwistle
- Reedley, Burnley
- Rishton Heights, Over Darwen
- Riston, Riston
- Rowley, Westhorne
- Saunder Clough, Dulesgate
- Scaitcliffe, Accrington
- Scholes Fold, Over Darwen
- Simonstone, Burnley
- Smear Hall, Wray nr Lancaster
- South Grain, Todmorden
- Stacksteads, Stacksteads
- Stacksteads Top, Stacksteads
- Stanhill,*Oswaldtwistle
- Swinshaw, Crawshaw Booth
- Taylors Green, Darwin
- Thornlee, Thornlee - shown disused 1908
- Thorny Bank, Burnley - Closed 1968
- Todmorden Moor, Todmorden
- Tonacliffe, Rossendale - shown as abandoned 1908
- Tonacliffe Level, Rossendale - shown as abandoned 1908
- Tong End Pasture, Facit
- Town Bent, Oswaldtwistle
- Town House, Great Marsden
- Towneley Demesne, Towneley
- Towneley Drift, Towneley
- Towneley Boggart, Towneley
- Towneley Park, Towneley
- Union and Hole House, Cliviger
- Wallnook, Wardle
- Waterside, Eccleshill
- Welch Whittle, Welch Wittle
- Welch Whitle Day Eye, Welch Whittle
- Weld Bank, Chorley
- Whinney Fan, Altham
- Whinney Hill, Altham
- Whitebirk, Blackburn
- Whitefield, Wardle
- Whitewell Bottoms, Newchurch
- Withwell, Chorley
- Wholaw Nook, Wholaw
- Woodnook, Accrington
- Yarrow, Duxbury

== Oldham area ==
- Alkrington, Middleton
- Bank House, Crompton, Oldham
- Bardsley, Bardsley
- Barrowshaw, Oldham
- Bent Grange, Oldham
- Besom Hill, Oldham
- Brown Hill Fire Clay, Oldham
- Browns, Crompton
- Brushes Clough, Shaw
- Chadderton, Chadderton
- Chamber, Oldham
- Count Hill, Oldham
- Crowl Knoll, Crompton
- Denton Lane, Chadderton
- Doghill, Crompton
- Edge Lane, Oldham
- Fairbottom, Bardsley
- Ferney Field, Chadderton
- Glodwick, Oldham
- Greenacres, Oldham
- Hanging Chadder, Thornham
- Hathershaw, Thornham
- Hartford, Oldham
- Helmclough, Stacksteads
- Hey, Oldham
- Higginshaw Lane, Royton
- Hodge Clough, Oldham
- Holebottom, Oldham
- Holebottom, Crompton
- Honeywell Lane, Oldham
- Hopwood, Hopwood
- Hunt Clough, Chadderton
- Jubilee, Crompton
- Knott Lane, Bardsley
- Low Crompton, Crompton
- Low Side, Glodwick
- Lower Moor, Oldham
- New Earth, Lees
- Oak, Oldham
- Park, Crompton
- Paulden Wood, Oldham
- Rhodes Bank, Oldham
- Robin Hill, Oldham
- Roundthorn, Oldham
- Royton, Royton
- Sholver Fold, Oldham
- Sholver Lane, Moorside
- Sholver Moor, Oldham
- Stockfield, Chadderton
- Sunfield, Moorside
- Tonge Lane, Middleton
- Woodpark, Bardsley
- Woodside, Chadderton

== Rochdale area ==
- Ab Top, Whitworth - shown as abandoned 1908
- Alder Bank, Wardle
- Ashworth, Ashworth
- Bagslate, Bagslate
- Bamford Closes, Norden
- Bench Carr Fireclay, Wardle
- Birchen Lee, Butterworth
- Birtle Dean, Ashworth
- Bower, Hollinwood Should be listed under Oldham
- Broadhalgh, Rochdale
- Brearley, Butterworth
- Brotherod, Catley Lane
- Brownhill, Catley Lane
- Brownhouse, Healey,
- Butterworth Hall, Milnrow
- Calf Clough, Wardle
- Captain Fold, Heywood
- Cartridge Nook, Whitworth
- Chadwick Hall, Chadwick
- Chamber, Hollinwood Should be listed under Oldham
- Close Barn No 2, Ashworth
- Clapgate, Woodhouse Lane, Rochdale
- Cleggswood, Butterworth
- Croft Head, Butterworth
- Crook Bank, Wardle
- Doldrum, Rowley Moor
- Drybank, Whitworth
- Ealees, Littleborough
- Greenland, Rowley Moor
- Haugh Hey, Rochdale
- Healey Hall, Healey
- Hey Barn, Wardle
- Hey Clough, Wardle
- Higher Shore, Littleborough
- Hill, Park Bridge Should be listed under Oldham
- Hill Top, Littleborough - Closed 1966
- Hodge Hill, Whitworth
- Hollingworth, Hollingworth
- Hugh Mill, Ashworth
- Knowl, Wolstenholme
- Knowsley, Whitworth
- Land, Whitworth
- Lanefoot, Littleborough
- Lidgate, Littleborough
- Lightowlers, Littleborough
- Low Crompton, Rochdale Should be listed under Oldham
- Lower Elpit Edge, Rochdale
- Meadow Croft, Chadwick
- Middlewood, Wardle Rochdale
- Milnrow, Milnrow
- Moleside, Milnrow
- New Whitaker, Butterworth
- Outwood, Rochdale
- Pikehouse, Littleborough
- Rake, Littleborough
- Roads, Wardle
- Rocher, Park Bridge Should be listed under Oldham
- Rook View, Whitworth
- Rough Bank, New Hay - shown as discontinued 1908
- Schofield Hall, Butterworth - shown disused 1908
- Shackleton, Shawforth
- Shaw Bank, Butterworth
- Shaw Field, Catley Lane
- Shaw Moss, Butterworth
- Sheepbank, Littleborough
- Shore Lane, Butterworth
- Skye, Littleborough
- Sladen Mill, Littleborough
- Smallbridge, Wardle
- Starring,*Littleborough
- Stopes, Littleborough
- Toadleach, Healey
- Tongue End Pasture, Rochdale
- Tunshill,*Tunshill
- Tunshill Hey, Littleborough
- Turf House, Littleborough
- Turf Pits, Oldham
- Turf Tavern, Bagslate
- Tweedale, Rochdale
- Wallnook, Wardle
- Whitaker Wood, Butterworth
- Wicken Hall, New Hay
- Wolstenholme Fold, Wolstenholme
- Woodhouse Lane, Woodhouse Lane

== St Helens area ==
- Alexandra, Eccleston, St Helens
- Almond, Skelmersdale
- Ashton's Green Nos 2, 3 and 5, Parr, St Helens
- Avenue, Rainford
- Belle View, Skelmersdale
- Berry Street, Skelmersdale
- Bickerstaffe, Bickerstaffe
- Black Moss, Skelmersdale
- Blaguegate, Skelmersdale
- Bold Nos 1, 2 and 3, Sutton, St Helens
- Broad Oak, Parr, St.Helens
- Carrs, Prescot
- Chapel House Nos 3 and 4, Skelmersdale
- Clay Works, Rainford
- Clock Face, Sutton, St Helens
- Collins Green Nos 1 and 2, Burtonwood.
- Coronation, Rainford
- Cowley Hill, Windle, St Helens
- Crank Hill, Prescott
- Crawford, Skelmersdale
- Cronton, Whiston
- Cronton No 2, Whiston
- Crop and Deep, St Helens
- Cropper's Hill, Eccleston, St.Helens
- Crow Orchard, Skelmersdale
- Dalton, Dalton
- Deep Pits, Rainford
- Digmoor, Skelmersdale
- Ditton Brook, Skelmersdale
- Downall Green, Ashton in Makerfield.
- Eccleston Hall, St Helens
- Edge Green, Ashton in Makerfield.
- Elton Head Colliery, Lowfield Lane, St Helens
- Far Moss, Skelmersdale
- Ferry Knoll, Skelmersdale
- Frodsham, St Helens
- Garswood Park, Ashton in Makerfield
- Gerard's Bridge, Windle
- Gillers Green, St Helens
- Gillibrand, Parbold
- Gin Lane, Eccleston
- Glade Hill, Parr
- Glenburn, Skelmersdale (Formerly Tawd Vale)
- Gorsey Bank, Bickerstaffe
- Green Gate, St Helens
- Halsnead, Prescott
- Havannah, Parr, St Helens
- Heath Charnock, Heath Charnock
- Hill Fold, Skelmersdale
- Hilton, Skelmersdale
- Holland, Upholland
- Huyton, Huyton
- Laffak, Parr, St Helens
- Lathom, Lathom
- Lathom Park, Lathom
- Lawns Delph, Skelmersdale
- Lea Green, St Helens
- Lea Green (New Pits), St Helens
- Legh Pit, Haydock (also known as Lee)
- Lyme Nos 1 and 2, Haydock
- Mill Lane, Rainford
- Moss, Skelmersdale
- Mossfield, Skelmersdale
- Moss Side, Skelmersdale
- New Boston, Haydock
- Newburgh, Newburgh
- Newton, Haydock
- Nutgrove, Thatto Heath
- Old Boston, Haydock
- Old Engine, Skelmersdale
- Parbold, Parbold
- Park, Skelmersdale
- Paradise, Prescott (properly known as Whiston No 1)
- Parkside, Newton-le-Willows, closed 1993
- Parr Stocks, Parr
- Pear Tree, Skelmersdale
- Peasley Cross, St Helens
- Pewfall Colliery, Pewfall, Ashton in Makerfield.
- Phoenix, St Helens
- Prescot, Prescot
- Prescot Brook, Huyton
- Primrose, Rainford
- Queen Pit, Haydock
- Railway, Charnock
- Rainford Delph, St Helens
- Ram Pit, Haydock
- Ravenhead, Sutton
- Red Gate, Parr, St Helens
- Rishton, Rishton
- Royal, Eccleston
- Sankey Brook, Parr, St Helens
- School Lane, Skelmersdale
- Sherdley, St Helens
- Skelmersdale, Skelmersdale
- Stanley, St Helens
- Strawberry, Skelmersdale
- School Lane, Skelmersdale
- Sutton, Sutton
- Sutton Manor, Sutton, St Helens
- Sutton Heath Nos 2 and 3, St Helens
- Swifts Fold, Skelmersdale
- Tawd Vale No 7, Skelmersdale - listed as discontinued
- Tawd Vale Nos 11 and 12, Skelmersdale
- Thatto Heath, Thatto Heath
- Union, Eccleston
- Upholland, Upholland
- Victoria, Rainford
- Whimsey, Skelmersdale
- Whinney, Skelmersdale
- Whiston Nos 1 and 2, Prescot (also known as Paradise)
- Whitemoss, Skelmersdale
- Whitemoss Primrose, Skelmersdale
- Whitmoss No 2, Skelmersdale
- Whitemoss Park, Skelmersdale
- Whitemoss Nos 4 and 6, Skelmersdale
- Windmill, Upholland
- Wood Pit, Haydock
- Woods Old Teapot Nos 3 and 4, St Helens

== Wigan area ==
=== Aspull ===
- Aspull Pumping, Aspull
- Bradshaw Hall, Aspull
- Bradshaw House, Aspull
- California, Aspull
- Kirkless, *Aspull,
- Kirkless Hall, Aspull,
- Kirkless, Aspull
- Kirkless Nos 1 and 2, Aspull
- Moor No 5, Aspull
- Woodshaw, Aspull

=== Ashton in Makerfield ===
- Arch Lane, Ashton in Makerfield Arch Lane Nos 2, 3 and 4
- Ashton, Ashton-in-Makerfield
- Bamfurlong No 1, No 3 & No 4, Ashton in Makerfield
- Bryn Hall Nos 1, 2, 3, 4, & 5, Ashton-in-Makerfield - Nos 2 and 3 abandoned November 1945
- Bryn Moss, Ashton in Makerfield
- Crawford No 1 No 2, Ashton in Makerfield
- Deep Pit No 1 & No 2, Ashton in Makerfield
- Downall Green, Ashton in Makerfield
- Garswood Hall Nos 1 and 2, Ashton in Makerfield
- Garswood Hall Nos 4, 5, 6 and 7, Ashton in Makerfield
- Garswood Hall No 9 - listed as abandoned
- Gladen Hey Ashton in Makerfield
- High Brooks, Ashton-in-Makerfield
- Ince Park Lane, Ashton in Makerfield
- Landgate, Ashton in Makerfield
- Lathom, Ashton in Makerfield
- Leyland Green Drift, Ashton-in-Makerfield
- Long Lane Nos 1 and 2, (Crow Pit), Ashton in Makerfield
- Mains Nos 1 and 2, Ashton in Makerfield
- Middle Pits, Ashton in Makerfield
- Moor Lane Drift, Ashton in Makerfield
- Park Lane, Ashton in Makerfield
- Park New Drift, Ashton in Makerfield
- Pewfall, Ashton-in-Makerfield
- Quaker House, Ashton-in-Makerfield
- Riding Lane, Ashton-in-Makerfield
- Senely Green, Ashton in Makerfield
- The Park Nos 1 & 2, Ashton in Makerfield
- Wain, Ashton in Makerfield

=== Billinge ===
- Bank, Billinge
- Birchley, Billinge
- Bispham Hall, Billinge
- Billinge Lane, Billinge
- Gauntley No 1, Billinge
- Mountains, Billinge
- Otter Swift Nook, Billinge
- Stanley, Billinge
- Tarbuck Farm, Billinge
- Walm, Billinge

=== Coppull ===
- Birkacre Nos 1 and 2, Coppull
- Blainscough 5 Feet, Coppull
- Blainscough King, Coppull
- Burgh, Coppull
- Chisnall Hall Colliery Nos 1 and 2, Coppull
- Coppull, Coppull
- Ellerbeck Colliery Coppull
- Hic-bibi, Coppull
- Wood Pits Nos 1 and 2, Coppull

=== Haigh ===
- Alexandra, Haigh
- Aqueduct, Haigh
- Bawkhouse, Haigh
- Bridge, Haigh
- Britannia, Haigh
- Godfrey, Haigh – listed as not working in 1880
- Gorses, Haigh
- Gullet, Haigh – listed as not working in 1880
- Haigh, Haigh,
- Lindsay Nos 1 and 2, Haigh Lindsay No 3,
- Meadow, Haigh
- Morris Lane, Haigh – listed as not working in 1880
- Tuckers Hill, Haigh – listed as not working in 1880
- Wash, Haigh – listed as not working in 1880
- William, Haigh

=== Hindley, Abram and Platt Bridge ===
- Albion, Hindley Green
- Grange Hall, Hindley
- Hindley Field, Hindley
- Hindley Green Six Feet, Hindley
- Hindley Hall, Hindley
- Long Lane Four Feet, Long Lane Three Feet, Hindley Green
- Plank Lane, Hindley Green
- Swan Lane, Hindley

- Abram, Abram
- Maypole Nos 1 and 2, Abram
- Smith's Lane, Abram
- Wigan Junction, Abram Nos 3 & 4

- Fir Tree House, Platt Bridge
- Foggs Fold, Platt Bridge
- Low Hall Nos 5& 6, Platt Bridge

=== Ince in Makerfield ===
- Amberswood, Ince-in-Makerfield
- Birkett Bank, Ince in Makerfield
- Hosier House, Ince-in-Makerfield
- Ince, Ince-in-Makerfield
- Ince Hall Nos 1 & 2, Ince-in-Makerfield
- Ince Moss, Ince in Makerfield
- Little Westwood, Ince-in-Makerfield
- Moss Nos 1, 2, 3, 4, 5 & 6 Ince in Makerfield
- Moss Hall, Ince-in-Makerfield
- Platt Bridge, Ince-in-Makerfield
- Rose Bridge, Ince in Makerfield
- Spring, Ince-in-Makerfield
- Trencherbone, Ince
- West Cannel, Ince in Makerfield

=== Pemberton ===
- Clap Gate, Pemberton
- Hawkley, Pemberton
- King Pit, Pemberton
- Moss House, Pemberton
- New Town, Pemberton
- Norley Nos 2, 3, 4, and 5, Pemberton
- Norley Hall, Pemberton
- Pemberton, Pemberton (later renamed Pemberton Bye)
- Pemberton King, Pemberton
- Pemberton Prince, Pemberton
- Pemberton Queen, Pemberton
- Stonehouse, Pemberton
- Waites Delf, Pemberton
- Walthewhouse, Pemberton
- Worsley Mesnes Nos 1 and 2, Pemberton
- Worthington Hall Nos 1 and 2, Pemberton
- Worsley Mesnes, Pemberton

=== Standish and Shevington ===
- Almond Brook, Standish
- Bradley, Standish
- Broomfield, Standish
- Four Lane Ends, Shevington, Wigan
- Giants Hall Nos. 1, 2 and 3, Standish
- Gidlow, Standish
- John & Taylor Pits, Standish
- Langtree, Standish
- Martins Farm, Appley Bridge
- Prospect, Standish
- Robin Hill, Standish
- Shevington, Shevington
- Standish Lower Ground, Standish
- Swire, Standish
- Taylor, Standish
- Tunnel, Standish – listed as not working in 1880
- Victoria, Standish Victoria No2 3 and 4
- Wrightington, Wrightington

=== Uphollhand and Orrell ===
- Albert, Upholland
- Crawford Day Eye, Upholland
- Ditton Brook, Upholland
- Harts Lane Fireclay, Upholland - abandoned August 1945
- Holland Nos 6 and 9, Upholland
- King Edward, Upholland
- Lafford Lane, Upholland
- Lawn's Delf, Upholland
- New Gate, Upholland
- Orrell Hall, Orrell
- Orrell Post, Orrell
- Springfield, Orrell
- Tower Hill, Upholland
- Upholland, Upholland – listed as not working in 1880
- Windmill Dalton, Upholland

=== Wigan ===
- Alliance, Wigan
- Arley, Wigan
- Arley Yard, Wigan
- Barley Brook, Wigan
- Birchen Heads, Wigan
- Blaguegate, Wigan
- Bottling Wood, Wigan
- Bye Pit, Wigan
- Dean House, Wigan
- Douglas Bank North, Wigan
- Douglas Bank South, Wigan
- Dove Lane, Wigan
- Dukes, Wigan
- East Cannel, Wigan
- Edith and Mabel, Wigan
- Elms, Wigan
- Engine, Wigan
- Gidlow and Swinley, Wigan
- Grammar, Wigan
- Hussey House, Wigan
- Industrious Bee, Wigan
- Meadow's House, Wigan
- Mesnes, Wigan
- Piltoft, Wigan
- Platt Lane, Wigan
- Saw Mills, Wigan
- Seven Feet, Wigan
- Sovereign Mill, Wigan
- Trafford, Wigan
- Whelley, Wigan

=== Winstanley ===
- Arbour, Winstanley
- Belle View, Dalton
- Holme House, Winstanley
- Summersales, Winstanley (formerly Sumners Hall Drift)
- Venture, Winstanley
- Windy Arbour, Winstanley
- Winstanley, Winstanley
