= Burnley Coalfield =

Coal mining region in England

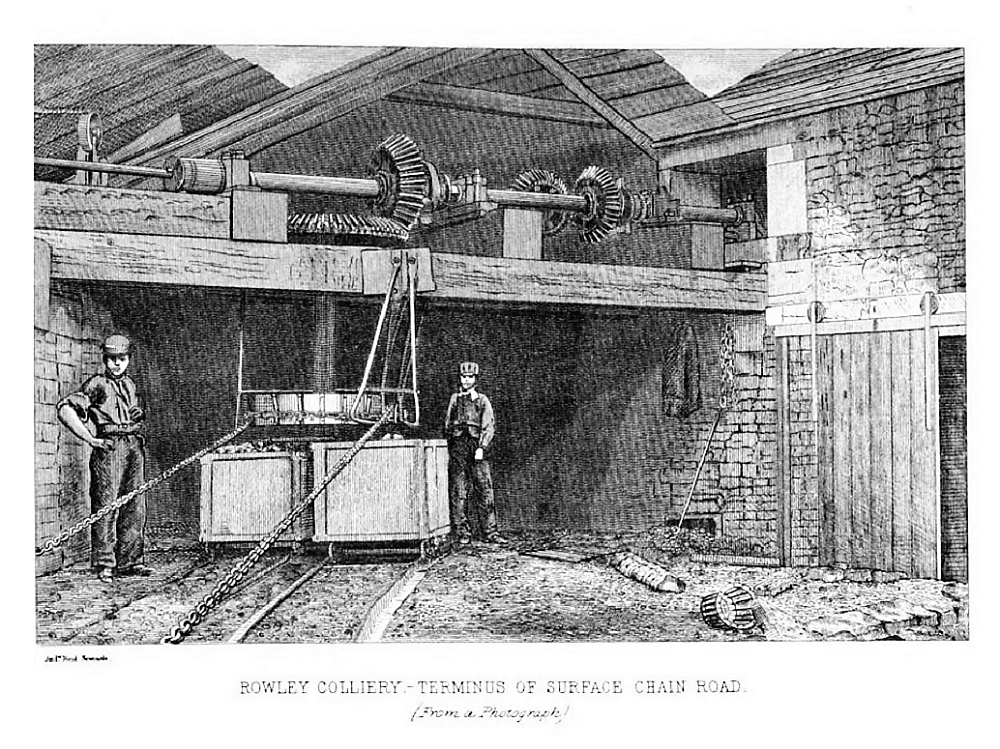
The terminus of the ginny track (tramway) at Rowley Colliery c.1868

The Burnley Coalfield is the most northerly portion of the Lancashire Coalfield. Surrounding Burnley, Nelson, Blackburn and Accrington, it is separated from the larger southern part by an area of Millstone Grit that forms the Rossendale anticline. Occupying a syncline, it stretches from Blackburn past Colne to the Yorkshire border where its eastern flank is the Pennine anticline.

== Geography and geology ==
The Burnley Coalfield which surrounds Burnley, Nelson, Blackburn and Accrington is the most northerly portion of the Lancashire Coalfield. The Rossendale anticline, an area of Millstone Grit, separates it from the larger southern part of the coalfield. Occupying a syncline bounded by the Pendle monocline to the north, the coalfield stretches from Blackburn, eastwards past Colne to the Pennine anticline on the border with Yorkshire.

The coalfield's seams are the Westphalian Coal Measures of the Carboniferous period, laid down from the vegetation of tropical swampy forests more than 300 million years ago but here, only the Lower Coal Measures remain. Within the coalfield, the dip in the strata varies from shallow to the south and west but steeper where there are faults. Named faults include the Deerplay Fault in the middle of the district which is associated with a line to west where the Lower Mountain and Upper Foot mines combine to form the Union mine. The Cliviger Valley Fault has a throw of up to 400 metres (1,300 ft) in the Cliviger valley. The intersecting Theiveley Lead Mine and nearby Hameldon Faults are some of a smaller number of easterly aligned structures which separate the coalfield from the horizontal strata of Rossendale. Other unnamed faults include one between Altham and Huncoat which is considered to be the boundary between the Burnley and Accrington district.

Around the district, 19 coal seams, of varying thickness were exploited over time. The most important were the Lower/Union and Upper Mountain, Dandy, King and Arley mines. (Note: In this part of Lancashire a coal seam is referred to as a mine and the coal mine as a colliery or pit.) Seams were generally less than 1.5 metres in thickness, frequently less. One notable exception occurs in the Calder Valley near Gawthorpe Hall, where as a result of the absence of the Tim Bobbin Rock which usually separates the King and Fulledge Thin mines, the Padiham Thick mine is up to 5.3 metres thick. Coal extracted from the Arley, Upper and Lower Mountain mines was used to produce high grade metallurgical coke which was in high demand for industry, whereas coal from the Union/Upper Foot mines had a high sulphur content making it unsuitable for making coke.

The Union mine is contaminated with in-seam concretions known locally as coal balls or bobbers, spherical concretions, composed of limestone measuring from 0.1 to 1.0 metre in diameter that posed hazards for mining. They were largely responsible for the closure of Bank Hall Colliery, the area's largest and deepest pit.

== History ==
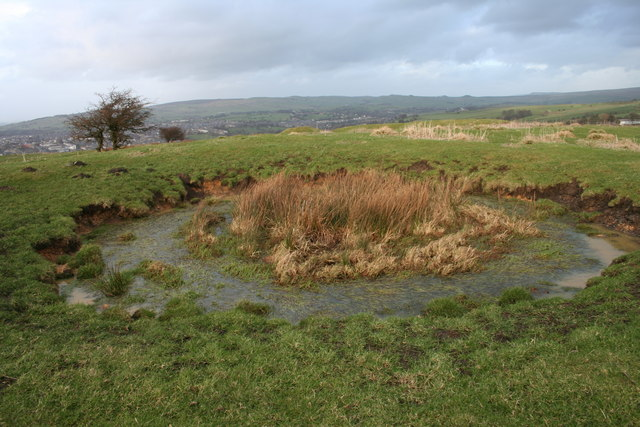
A collapsed bell pit at Castercliff near Nelson

Coal was exploited in the 13th century at Trawden near Colne where receipts are mentioned in a rent roll from 1295. Coal was also bought at Cliviger. The first coals were extracted at the outcrops before shaft and adit mining were adopted. The coal industry grew in the 16th and 17th centuries, developing from manorial tenants who dug coal for their own use into fixed term leases in return for rent. Coal was mined all around Burnley, mostly from shafts. By 1800, more than a dozen pits had been sunk in central Burnley.

The arrival of the Leeds and Liverpool Canal was a catalyst for industrialisation as was the coming of the Lancashire and Yorkshire Railway line through Burnley to Colne in 1848. In the 1840s some old small pits such as Cleggs Pit and Habergham closed and larger collieries were sunk at Bank House Colliery, Whittlefield Colliery and the old Fulledge Colliery was redeveloped and linked by a tramway to canal. Tramways came into more common use in the 1880s and several collieries in the town were linked by the system.

Several collieries were nationalised under the Coal Industry Nationalisation Act 1946 on vesting day, 1 January 1947. After the 1950s much of the area was opencasted. Coal was opencast at Helm, Royal Zone, Gawthorpe Hall and Tipping Hill. Hill Top Colliery, a very small drift mine near Bacup, was still producing small amounts of coal in 2010 before complete closure in 2014.

== Collieries ==
=== Accrington district ===
- Aspen Colliery 53°45′07″N 2°23′59″W was next the canal and the East Lancashire line at Oswaldtwistle, having both a canal basin and railway siding. Mining here is thought to have commenced in the early 19th century and the colliery closed in 1930. The remains of the site which includes two stone-built engine beds and a bank of 24 beehive type coke ovens are protected as a scheduled monument.
- Baxenden Colliery 53°43′52″N 2°20′53″W was located on the western side of Baxenden village next to the old railway line from Accrington to Bury.
- Broadfield Colliery 53°44′13″N 2°22′52″W was south of Oswaldtwistle. The 1840s a surface tramroad connected to the printworks and Foxhill Bank via Moscow Mills.
- Dunkenhalgh Park Colliery 53°45′40″N 2°23′49″W was south of Dunkenhalgh.
- Huncoat Colliery 53°46′23″N 2°20′49″W was sunk by George Hargreaves and Company between 1890 and 1893. The shafts accessed the Upper and Lower Mountain mines. The company linked its Calder and Scaitcliffe Collieries to Huncoat underground before 1930 and it wound the coal from all three pits. The colliery was nationalised in 1947 and the NCB modernised the pit to raise productivity. Improvements were made to the pit bottom and coal raising was improved by higher capacity cages. Underground, new diesel locomotives hauled three-ton mine cars. The colliery closed after its coal was exhausted in 1968.

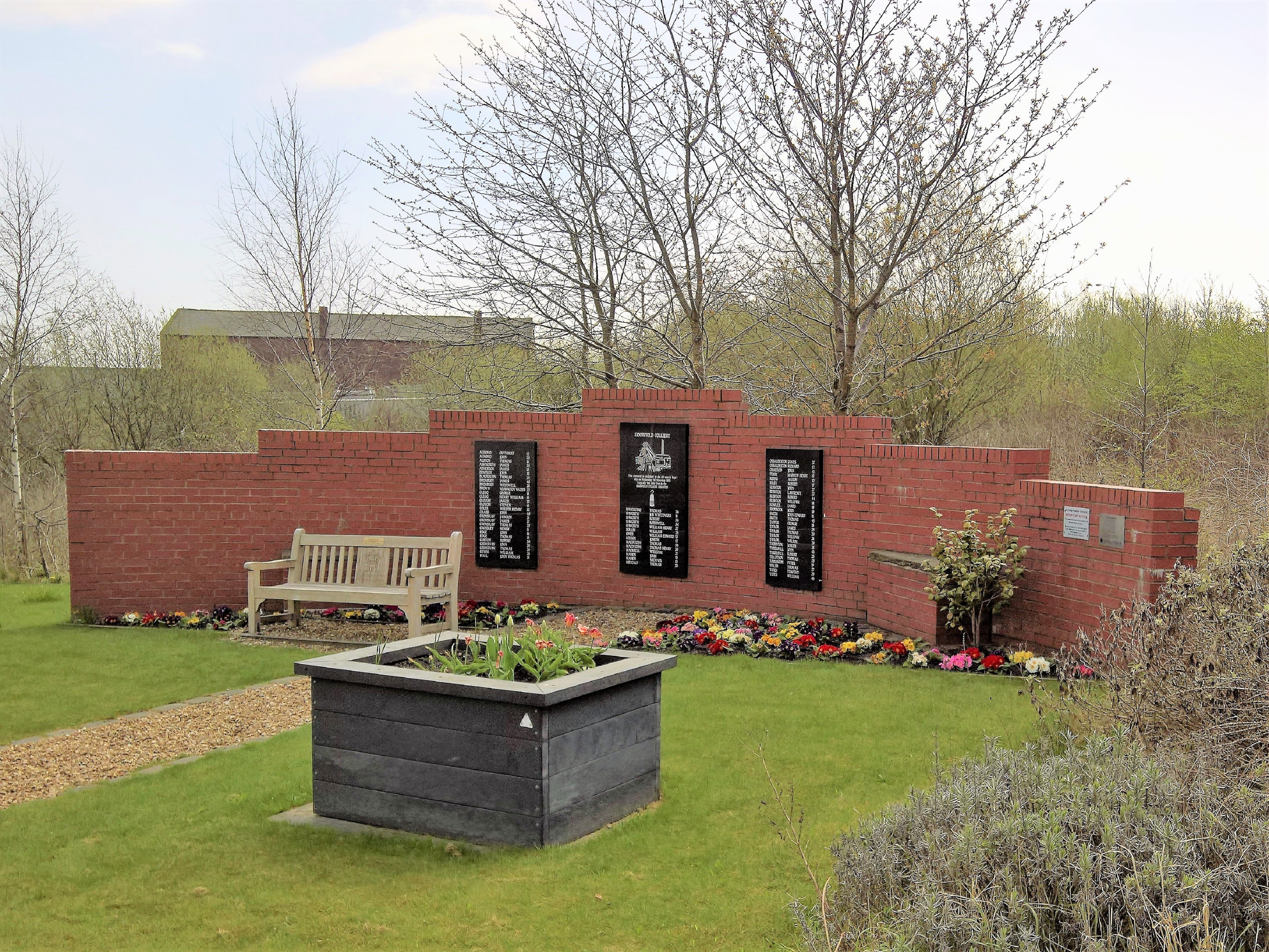
Monument to the Moorfield disaster.

- Moorfield Colliery 53°46′37″N 2°22′12″W next to the canal in Altham was opened around 1880 and mining continued until 1949. It was retained by the NCB as a pumping station until around 1970. It was originally worked by the Altham Colliery Company, who sunk a single 87-metre (285 ft) shaft, linked by a 1,100-metre (1,200 yd) inclined roadway to their colliery at Whinney Hill 53°46′05″N 2°22′25″W for ventilation and emergency escape. In 1895 the site had a winding engine with twin 66-centimetre (26 in) diameter cylinders made by Ashton, Frost and Co, a pumping engine capable of extracting over 230 gallons per minute by Hathorn, Davey and Co, and a surface-driven endless chain haulage system. There was also screening plant, a battery of 25 Simon Carves coke ovens and a bank of beehive type ovens. On 7 November 1883 an underground explosion killed 68 miners, including 13 boys and the colliery manager.
- Martholme Colliery 53°47′49″N 2°23′06″W near the old hall at Martholme was connected to Bridge Hey Colliery 53°48′14″N 2°22′08″W across the River Calder and Great Harwood Colliery 53°47′17″N 2°24′09″W also known as Park Pit, in Great Harwood.
- Rishton Colliery 53°45′58″N 2°24′50″W in Rishton was begun by P.W. Pickup Ltd in late November 1884 and mining continued until 1941. The NCB used it as a pumping station from 1955 until 1970. A ginny road from the pit connected to a coaling wharf on the canal.
- Scaitcliffe Colliery 53°45′04″N 2°22′05″W in Accrington was sunk to the Lower Mountain mine in the late 19th century. It was located south of Accrington railway station, next to the old railway line to Bury near Howard & Bullough's Globe Works. After nationalisation the NCB employed 182 men underground and another 25 on the surface, but the colliery closed in the summer of 1962.
- Sough Lane Colliery 53°43′48″N 2°25′44″W was southwest of Oswaldtwistle and had a tramroad connecting it to Knuzden.
- Town Bent Colliery 53°44′10″N 2°23′49″W was south of Oswaldtwistle.

=== Burnley district ===
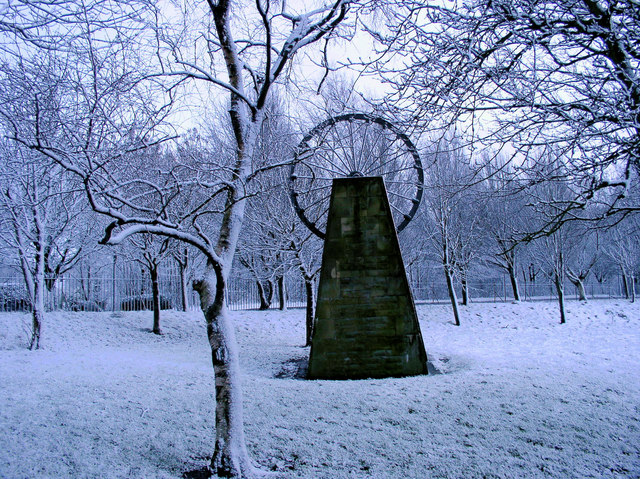
Monument in Bank Hall Park

- Bank Hall Colliery 53°47′53″N 2°14′06″W was the town's largest and deepest pit, sunk by the Executors of John Hargreaves between 1865 and 1869 and the pit closed on 17 April 1971.
- Barclay Hills Colliery 53°46′59″N 2°16′23″W was started before 1834. Its site was later occupied by coke ovens linked by tramroads to Hapton Valley and a coal staithe on the canal. The colliery had two shafts to the Arley Mine and a cupola chimney. Although the coke ovens are marked as disused on the 1912 map, coal screening of the output from Hapton Valley continued until 1947.
- Bee Hole Colliery 53°47′24″N 2°13′41″W was located to the northeast of Burnley FC's Turf Moor home and for many years gave its name that end of the football ground (replaced in the 1990s by the Jimmy McIlroy stand).
- Black Clough Colliery 53°44′42″N 2°12′18″W was opened by the Deerplay Colliery Company in 1915. It worked a small area of the Arley mine north of the Deerplay fault, and the Lower Mountain mine on the south side from a drift in Black Clough about 1.2 km distant. The colliery closed in 1940 but was reopened by the NCB between 1948 and 1950. A ginny road from the pit connected to a coal staith near the Thieveley Pike triangulation point, 1470 feet above sea level. The coal was opencasted between 1948 and 1955.

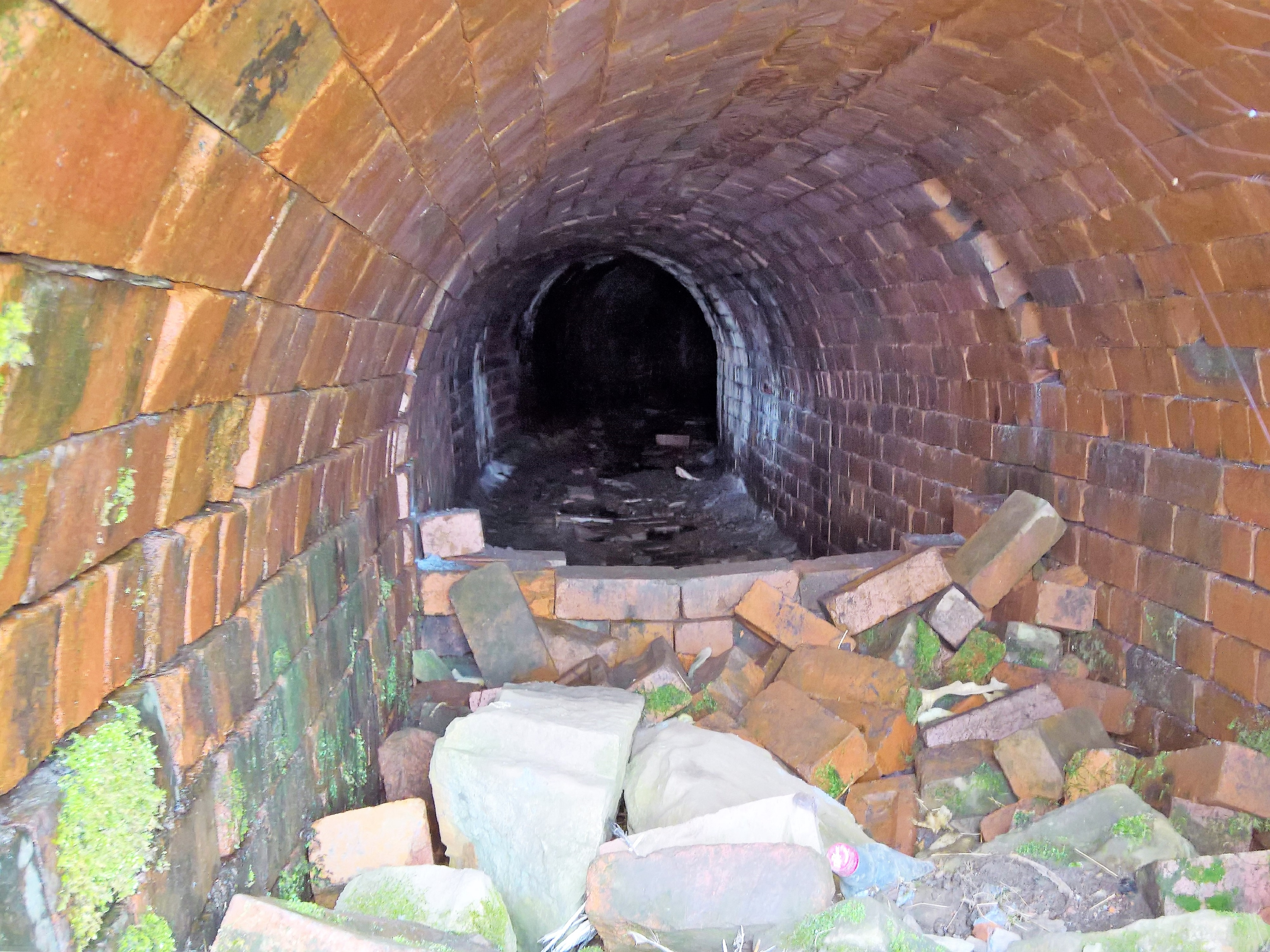
An old surface drift at the site of Porters Gate Colliery.

- Burnt Hills Colliery 53°45′11″N 2°15′47″W on the Burnley – Edenfield road (A682) at Clow Bridge in Dunnockshaw and nearby Porters Gate 53°45′36″N 2°16′12″W were two small collieries owned by the Executors of John Hargreaves that operated from the 1840s and closed in 1920 as the redeveloped Hapton Valley Colliery had taken over their workings 10 years previously. Both worked the Upper and Lower Mountain mines and Burnt Hills had a coal staithe and a surface tramroad that connected the pits by about 1863. In 1880 the tramroad was extended from Porters Gate to connect to the system at Hapton Valley. In 1892 Burnt Hills had two 44-metre (48 yd) shafts with a single-cylinder winding engine and an underground engine drove a 3.2-kilometre (2 mi) long haulage system that raised the coal through a surface drift. Porters Gate had several shafts and a least three surface drifts and was one of the few pits in the area to record zero fatal accidents.
- Calder Colliery 53°47′42″N 2°20′38″W was open from 1908 until July 1958. It was sunk by George Hargreaves Collieries beside the Padiham to Clayton-le-Moors (A678) road on the north side the River Calder near Simonstone. Shaft sinking had commenced by 1903 but was stopped for several years due to water ingress. Coal was got from the Lower Mountain mine which was 0.8 metres (2 ft 8 in) thick using longwall cutters and conveyor belts The pit was later linked to Huncoat and Moorfield Collieries. The pit was nationalised in 1947 and even though it was uneconomic, demand for this quality of coal was so high that production continued until its reserves were depleted and it closed in 1958.
- Clifton Colliery 53°47′38″N 2°15′18″W was sunk in 1876 by the Executors of John Hargreaves on the road from Burnley to Clifton Farm. It closed in 1955 but one shaft was retained for use as a pumping station until 1971.
- Mining at Copy Pit 53°44′35″N 2°10′37″W began in the 1830s from a drift near to Walton Copy Farm in Cliviger near the source of the River Calder. After the arrival of the railway line between Todmorden on the Manchester and Leeds Railway and Burnley in the 1850s, the Cliviger Coal and Coke Company expanded its operations. The pit was near the summit of the railway and gave its name to the route. Copy Row, a terrace of seven cottages was built for the mine workers on Burnley Road. The company built coke ovens and a gantry over the Todmorden turnpike road to a loading bay by the rail line. To access the Arley mine, the company sank two shafts in 1860. A Cornish-type steam pump was installed to de-water the pit. The headgear for each shaft was arranged on either side of the engine house with a single wheel for each. One shaft had a cage for miners and the other had a cage for coal tubs. Copy Pit was the Cliviger Coal and Coke Company's only colliery to be nationalised in 1947 as the others had been worked out. The pit produced 1,000 tons of coal per week until 1963, when it closed. At nationalisation the pit employed 52 men below ground in the Dandy seam and 17 surface workers.

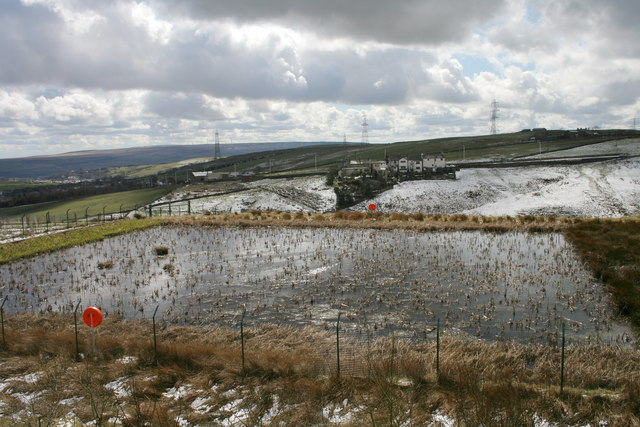
Deerplay filter beds

- Deerplay Colliery 53°44′02″N 2°11′49″W was established close to the source of the River Irwell and the Burnley to Bacup Road by the Deerplay Colliery Company in 1894/5. The colliery's two drifts accessed the Lower Mountain and Little mines in workings to the west of the drifts. After 1915, the colliery was worked with the company's other drift mine at Black Clough until 1940. In the 1940s Deerplay employed up to 46 men underground and 8 on the surface. It closed in April 1941 but the National Coal Board NCB refurbished it before re-opening it to exploit reserves to the east of the drifts in 1951/2. The new colliery had an average workforce of 143 underground and 15 surface workers. Ten advancing longwall faces were worked including one at Hill Top which after closure was linked by a tunnel. The last face at Hill Top was closed as it neared old workings in November 1967 and was abandoned in March 1968. The Deerplay site is now occupied by lagoons for settling and filtering ochreous water from the workings which polluted the Irwell from its source.

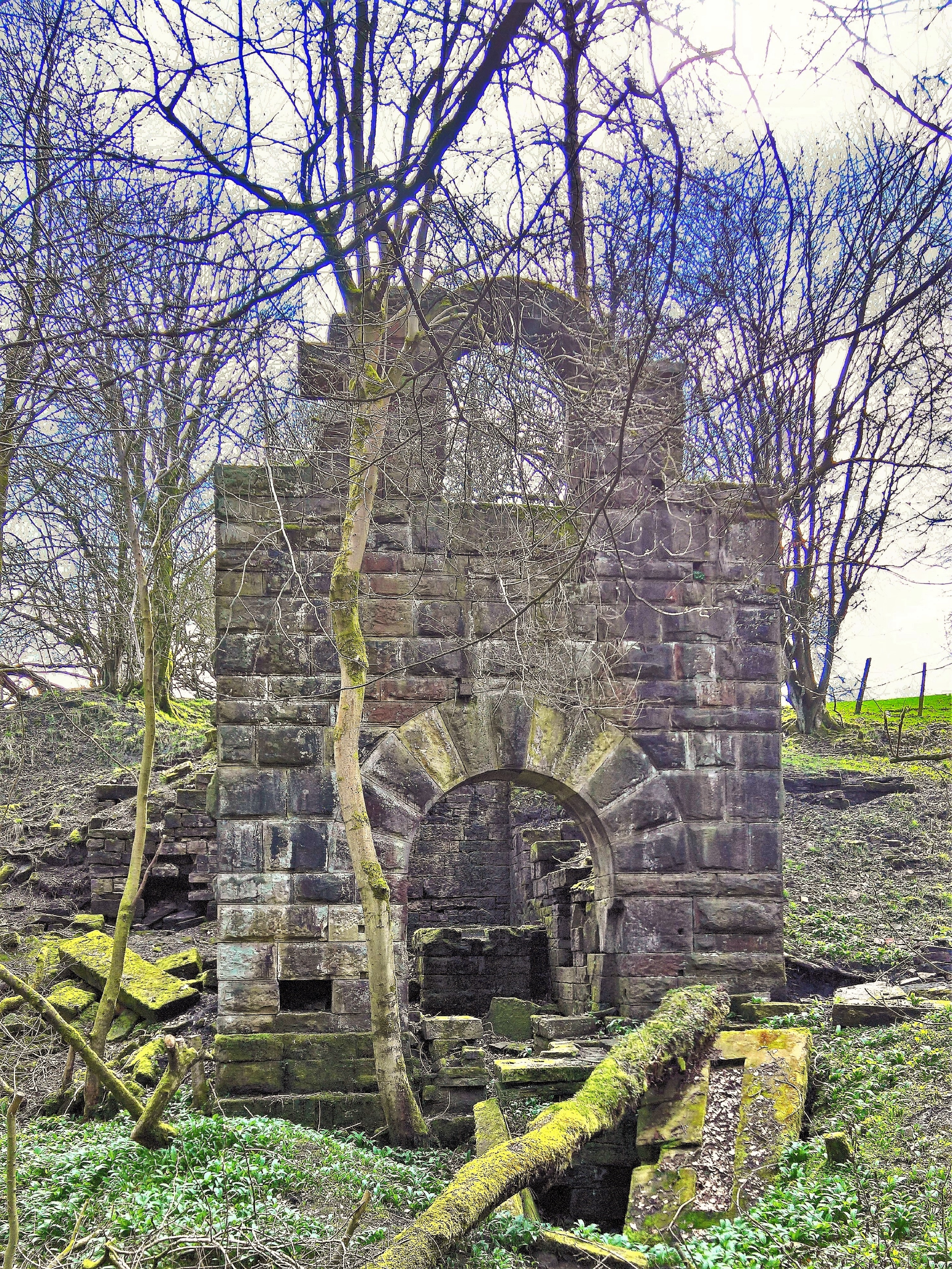
The remains of the engine house at Fox Clough Colliery

- Fox Clough Colliery 53°51′00″N 2°09′50″W was south of Colne. Coal was being mined at Fox Clough from the early 17th-century, however this colliery also known as Engine Pit was started by the Executors of John Hargreaves, probably around 1832. Its beam-engine house was in Church Clough. By the 1840s a surface drift was located at the foot of the clough, on the south side of Colne Water, about 400 metres from the engine house and a tramroad crossed the river connecting the colliery to a coal yard in the town. It seems the coal here was not of a high quality, as during the winter of 1860 a local newspaper reported that the frozen canal and diversion of railway wagons had forced the inhabitants of Colne, to resort to town's coal pit. Fox Clough Colliery was abandoned in 1872. Trawden Colliery 53°50′46″N 2°09′43″W (1874–1890) located about 200 metres up the valley, continued production from the same workings. A largely underground tramroad connected it to the existing route at the drift entrance buildings. The system was marked as disused in 1893.
- Fulledge Colliery 53°47′13″N 2°14′10″W, to the east of the Burnley Embankment, was linked to it by a tramroad. The first pit was sunk by Henry Blackmore in about 1720. It had a 16 yards deep shaft and was drained from a second shaft using an endless bucket chain powered by a waterwheel. The pit was a little way from the river and a dispute with the neighbouring tenant over water channels led to its abandonment. In 1736 Blackmore leased it out for a while after which he gave it to his father-in-law. After his death in 1754 Blackmore's widow married the Rev John Hargreaves making Fulledge the first colliery of the company that came to dominate the industry on the Burnley Coalfield. In 1770 the pit was worth £100 a year, producing an average of 15 to 18 tons per week.
- Gambleside Colliery 53°44′31″N 2°16′05″W was near Clowbridge Reservoir. It was connected to the pre-existing tramroad from Swinshaw 53°44′02″N 2°15′54″W to a coal yard in Crawshawbooth.
- Gannow Colliery 53°47′20″N 2°16′37″W on Gannow Lane near the canal was linked to a coal staithe by a tramroad. It was begun by the Executors of John Hargreaves in 1856. Construction of the 229-metre (250 yd) shaft took many years and several lives were lost due to accidents. Originally an endless chain system driven from the surface was used for transport, this being replaced in 1862. Mining ceased in 1878, but it was used to wind coal from Habergham until it closed in 1941.
- Grime Bridge Colliery 53°43′16″N 2°13′44″W was due east of Rossendale hamlet of Lumb and was linked by a tramroad to a coal staithe further down the valley at Whitewell Bottom.
- Habergham Colliery 53°47′53″N 2°17′35″W was on the turnpike road from Burnley to Padiham near Gawthorpe Hall close to the earlier Gawthorpe Colliery 53°47′49″N 2°17′56″W and Dugdale Pit. After two years development by the Executors of John Hargreaves, production began from the Arley mine at a depth of 218 metres (714 ft) in 1870. As the colliery developed it was linked underground to Gannow and on the surface it was connected to the pre-existing tram road from Cornfield 53°48′29″N 2°17′13″W via East Pit 53°48′18″N 2°18′18″W to a coal yard in Padiham, and a surface drift was driven to the Top Bed mine. A shortage of manpower led to closure in 1941.
- Hapton Valley Colliery 53°46′41″N 2°17′31″W was sunk in 1853. After nationalisation the NCB, in 1950 constructed a 1,190-metre-long (3,900 ft) loco-drift to the west. Thorny Bank Colliery 53°46′19″N 2°18′58″W began operation in 1952, utilising a small surface drift was driven from Thorney Bank Clough in the early 1940s, for ventilation. They moved Hapton Valley's area of operation to the east, completing two new drifts from the pit bottom, cutting through the Deerplay Fault, in 1954. On 22 March 1962 at Hapton Valley, an explosion 750 feet below ground killed 19 men. A new surface drift was completed in 1962 to replace the 90 yards deep shaft. In the 1960s the workforce of 412 men produced 212,000 tons of coal each year from the Upper and Lower Mountain mines, while Thorny Bank employed 300 men who produced 160,000 tons of coal annually. Difficult geological conditions led to the closure of Thorny Bank in 1968, but Hapton Valley survived to be the last deep mine operating on the coalfield, closing in 1982.
- Laneshaw Bridge Colliery 53°51′32″N 2°06′50″W was southeast of Laneshaw Bridge village near Emmott. The Cannell mine was only 0.5 metres thick there.
- Marsden Colliery 53°49′30″N 2°14′10″W was in Brierfield close to the canal. It is thought that coal was being mined n the vicinity in the early-17th century, but this colliery, originally known as Brierfield Pit, was begun around 1811. It was the first colliery in the area to use endless chain haulage powered by a steam engine. As Marsden was nearing the end of its reserves in 1872 an explosion in a disused section killed two men and caused an underground fire. Operations were wound down and the pit closed in early 1873.

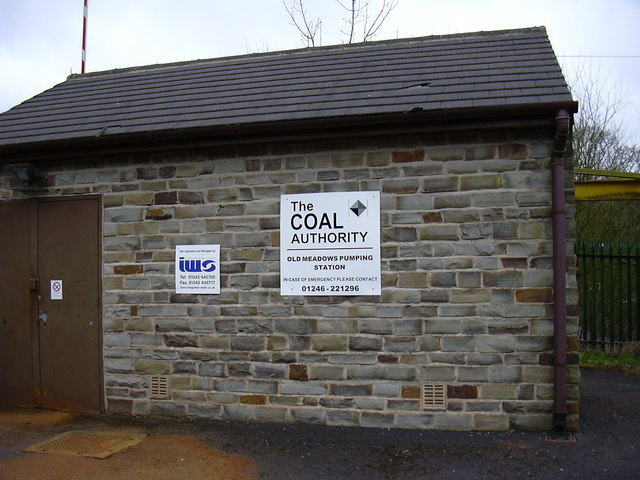
Old Meadows Pumping Station

- Old Meadows Colliery 53°42′32″N 2°12′07″W was a drift mine on the northern edge of Bacup. Driven in about 1854 by Hargreaves, Ashworth & Company, it accessed the Lower Mountain or Union mine. George Hargreaves & Company owned it in 1890 employing about 38 men underground and 9 surface workers. Under the NCB little modernisation took place although more men were employed, 53 men worked underground and 12 on the surface and the coal continued to be hauled along 1.2-metre-high (3.9 ft) roadways. The mine closed in March 1969.
- Railway Pit 53°45′50″N 2°12′07″W at Walk Mill in Cliviger was the furthest of the Cliviger Colliery Company's pits from the Burnley to Todmorden Railway. It was sunk about 1840 and its workings eventually stretched for almost four miles towards Hurstwood. It was accessed by two sloping drifts. Coal was moved to the sidings and coke ovens near the railway along a tramway. Candles were used for light in the pit. It accessed the Arley seam. The pit closed in 1938. The arched entrance to the drift, the engine house and evidence of the tramway remain.
- Reedley Colliery 53°48′25″N 2°14′46″W also known as Barden Pit was sunk by the Executors of John Hargreaves next to the canal in 1879. The pair of 192-metre (210 yd) shafts accessed the Arley mine, and the Dandy and the King mines after 1910. The company linked the pit underground to Bank Hall before 1893 and its coal was transported directly to Bank Hall's wash plant via a drift. Its pithead baths, opened in November 1914, were the first in east Lancashire and only the second in the country. Wood End Colliery 53°48′47″N 2°15′22″W was constructed from 1910 as a downcast shaft for Reedley. After nationalisation the NCB developed two high-productivity drift mines at Fence connected to each pit. Fence No 1 53°49′25″N 2°17′02″W was worked-out by 1950 and Wood End closed in 1959. Fence No 2 53°49′26″N 2°16′41″W closed with Reedley in May 1960.

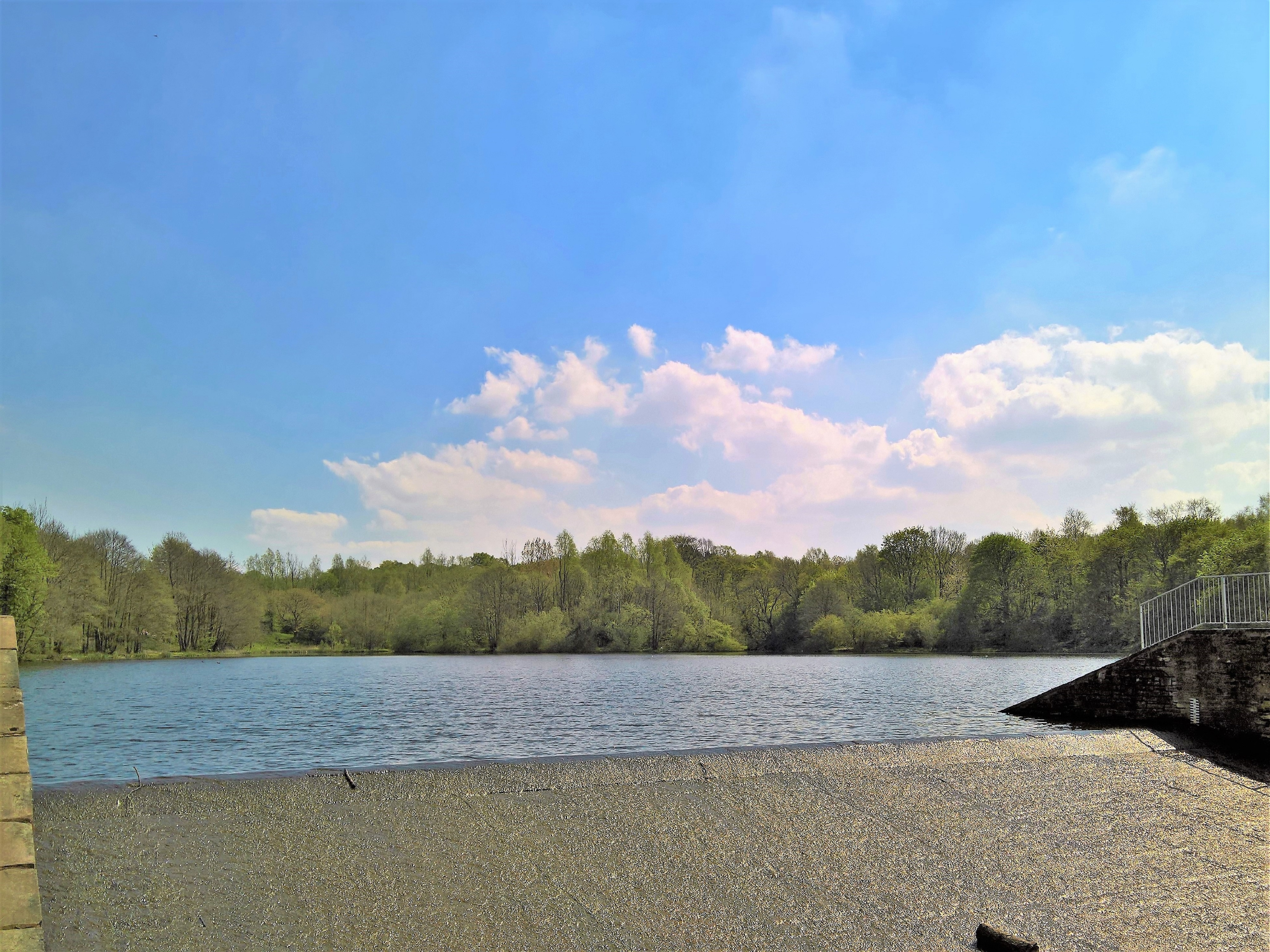
The man-made lake at Rowley

- Rowley Colliery 53°47′38″N 2°13′01″W was sunk by the Executors of John Hargreaves in 1861 next to Rowley Hall on the River Brun. It closed in 1928, but its spoil tip on the banks of the river continued to be used by Bank Hall, causing a significant pollution issue. Since 1971 restoration works by Lancashire County Council have seen extensive modifications to the river including the creation of Rowley Lake.
- Town House or Clough Head Colliery 53°49′55″N 2°11′38″W in Nelson was owned by Spencer and Wilson. On 12 April 1850 six men were working in the pit when one man went to check for gas with a safety lamp but before he signalled it was safe, another man removed the top from his lamp causing an explosion that killed them all. A second explosion in November 1856 resulted in two fatalities. The colliery had two coke ovens in the early 19th century. There is evidence in the area of bell pits at Swinden and surface mining at Castercliffe.
- Towneley Colliery 53°46′26″N 2°13′55″W, also known as Towneley Demesne, was on the hillside to the west of Towneley Hall where the company also had a fire clay works. Work began sinking the shafts in late February 1869 and it closed March 1949. It had three satellite pits, Dyneley Knoll 53°45′14″N 2°12′47″W, Boggart Brig 53°46′16″N 2°13′41″W and Park Pits 53°46′19″N 2°12′36″W.
- The Union Pit 53°46′01″N 2°12′36″W was sunk in about 1853 in Walk Mill, Cliviger, where the Cliviger Coal Company had its headquarters. Its shaft was 450 feet deep and a drift accessed the workings. The colliery had a gasometer that supplied gas to light the shaft bottom, the surface buildings and nearby miners' cottages. Coal was moved to the sidings that served Railway Pit along a tramway. In 1910 it employed 10 miners and 19 surface workers. Union Pit closed in 1943. Steps that accessed the shaft and the drift's stone arch survive. Hole House Pit 53°46′01″N 2°12′58″W, situated west of the bridge where the Copy Pit rail route crosses Burnley Road, was the pumping shaft for Union Pit. It closed in 1939 and the site was cleared in 1964.
- Whittle Field Colliery 53°47′28″N 2°15′25″W was close to the canal near Whittle Field Farm.

== See also ==
- Collieries in the Burnley area since 1854
- List of mining disasters in Lancashire
