= Hapton Valley Colliery =

Coal mine in Lancashire, England

Hapton Valley Colliery was a coal mine on the edge of Hapton near Burnley in Lancashire, England. Its first shafts were sunk in the early 1850s and it had a life of almost 130 years, surviving to be the last deep mine operating on the Burnley Coalfield.

== Geology ==
The Burnley Coalfield, separated from the South Lancashire Coalfield, is in the form of an oval bowl extending north-east from Blackburn, past Colne to the Pennine Hills. Bounded by the Pendle monocline to the north and the Rossendale Valley anticline to the south, the coalfield is dissected by a series of predominately north-westerly trending faults, the most significant fault is the Cliviger Valley Fault at Burnley with a throw of up to 400 metres (1,300 ft) in Cliviger valley. The intersecting Theiveley Lead Mine Fault is one of a smaller number of easterly aligned structures. Unlike South Lancashire, only the Lower Westphalian coal measures are available. The hills above are formed of Carboniferous sandstones, ranging from millstone grits to finer grained stone such as the Dyneley Knott flags and the Dandy Mine Rock. The drift cover consists primarily of glacial till deposits, which cause poor-drainage soils.

Hapton Valley worked the Upper Mountain and Lower Mountain / Union seams in a syncline that extends from the Thieveley Fault, north-west to Higham where it outcrops. The area is split centrally by the Deerplay Fault with a throw of up to 100 metres (330 ft), which runs from White Hill (near Crown Point), under the eastern side of Hameldon Hill and Burnley's Lowerhouse district. The coal extracted from the Upper and Lower Mountain seams was ideal for producing high grade metallurgical coke which was in high demand in industry.

== Early history ==
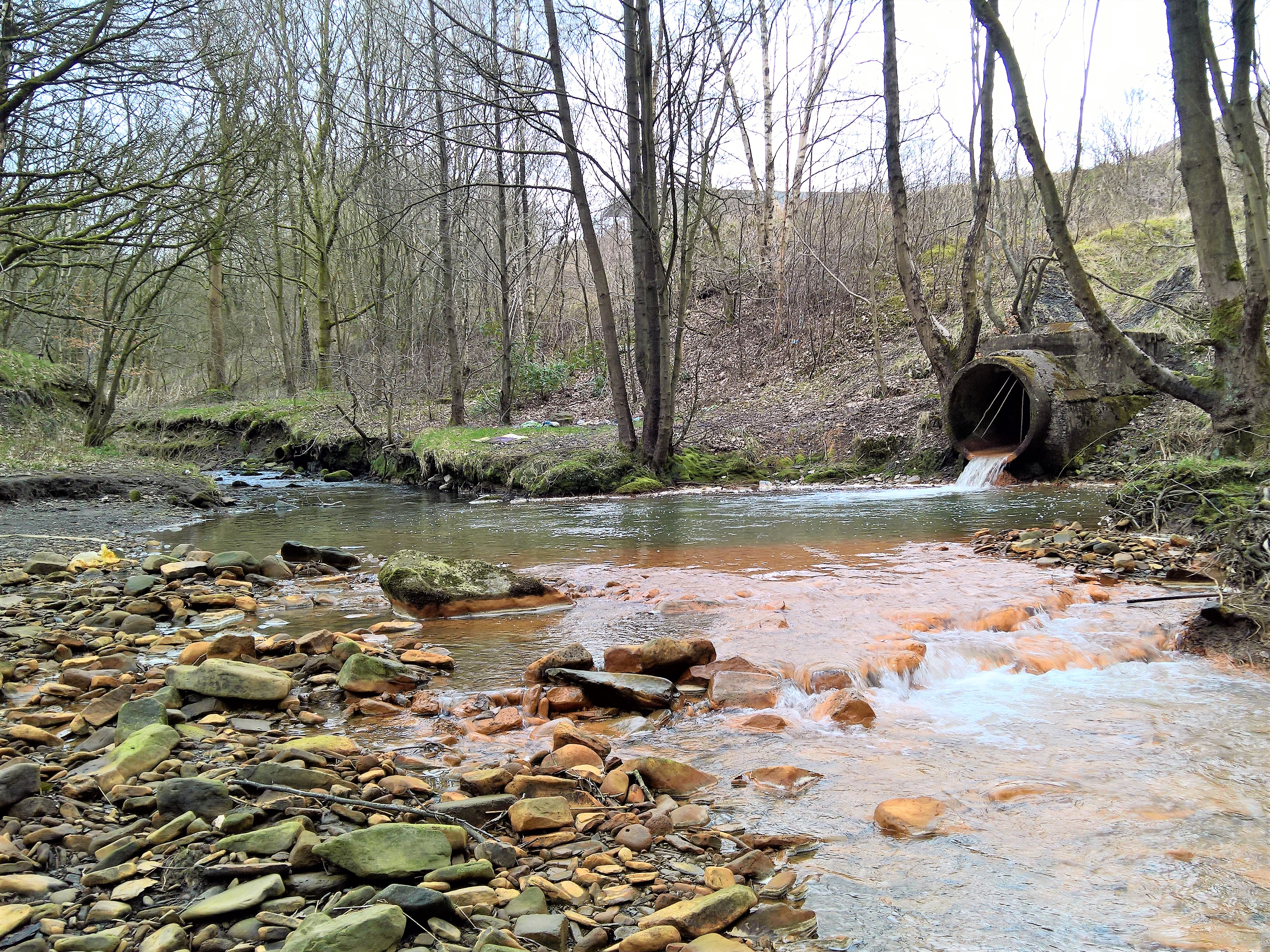
The confluence of Hapton Clough and Habergham Clough in Spa Wood.

Beginning in 1853 at Spa Wood, two shafts where sunk to a depth of 128 metres (420 ft) for the Exors of John Hargreaves Ltd. The site was on a spit of land between Hapton and Habergham Cloughs, just south of where they combine to form Green Brook. The shafts were on the north-west side of the Deerplay fault and although the Lower Mountain mine was reached, the pit was sunk in an area where it merges with the Upper Foot mine. The difficult geological conditions led to both shafts being partially filled, and the Upper Mountain mine being worked. (Note: In this part of Lancashire a coal seam is referred to as a mine and the coal mine as a colliery or pit.) Coal was transported underground, raised to the surface and delivered onwards on a network of tram roads, known locally as ginny roads or tracks, by wheeled iron tubs drawn by an endless-chain system which was driven by a stationary steam engine. The tubs ran along circuits made of 22 inch gauge, angle-iron tracks but as the seam only averaged 0.84 metres (2 ft 9 in) in height, shorter tubs with half the capacity were used underground. Two drifts cut into the hillside connected the underground system to the surface and provided access for the miners.

On the surface, the ginny track delivered the coal to a coking plant at Barclay Hills Colliery to the northeast, and ultimately connected to the Leeds and Liverpool Canal at Gannow in Burnley. By 1868, the underground tracks had reached 1,394 metres (1,524 yd) and 970 metres (1,060 yd) in length and about 370 tonnes of coal per day was raised. (Note: By the 1890s the surface ginny road also connected Hapton Valley to Porters Gate Colliery in the southeast) but sometime later, problems with faulting and water ingress led to mining being stopped.

== Expansion ==
In the 1880s the shafts were increased in diameter and larger pumping equipment was installed and mining resumed by 1890. The horizontal, condensing steam engine powered four bucket-lifts but a system of specially designed automatic fill and empty barrels was also employed to raise 1,000,000 gallons of water per day from the workings. By 1908 work had commenced on two new shafts (No. 3 and No. 4) 200 metres north-west. They were completed to a depth of 157 metres (515 ft) by 1910. Manpower was transferred from the old site, with Spa Pit (No.1) closing in 1935. No. 2 shaft continued to be used for pumping. In the early 1940s a small surface drift was driven from Thorney Bank Clough behind the Hapton Inn to speed-up access for the miners. (Note: After 1950 Thorney Bank Colliery utilised the drift for ventilation.)

== Later years ==
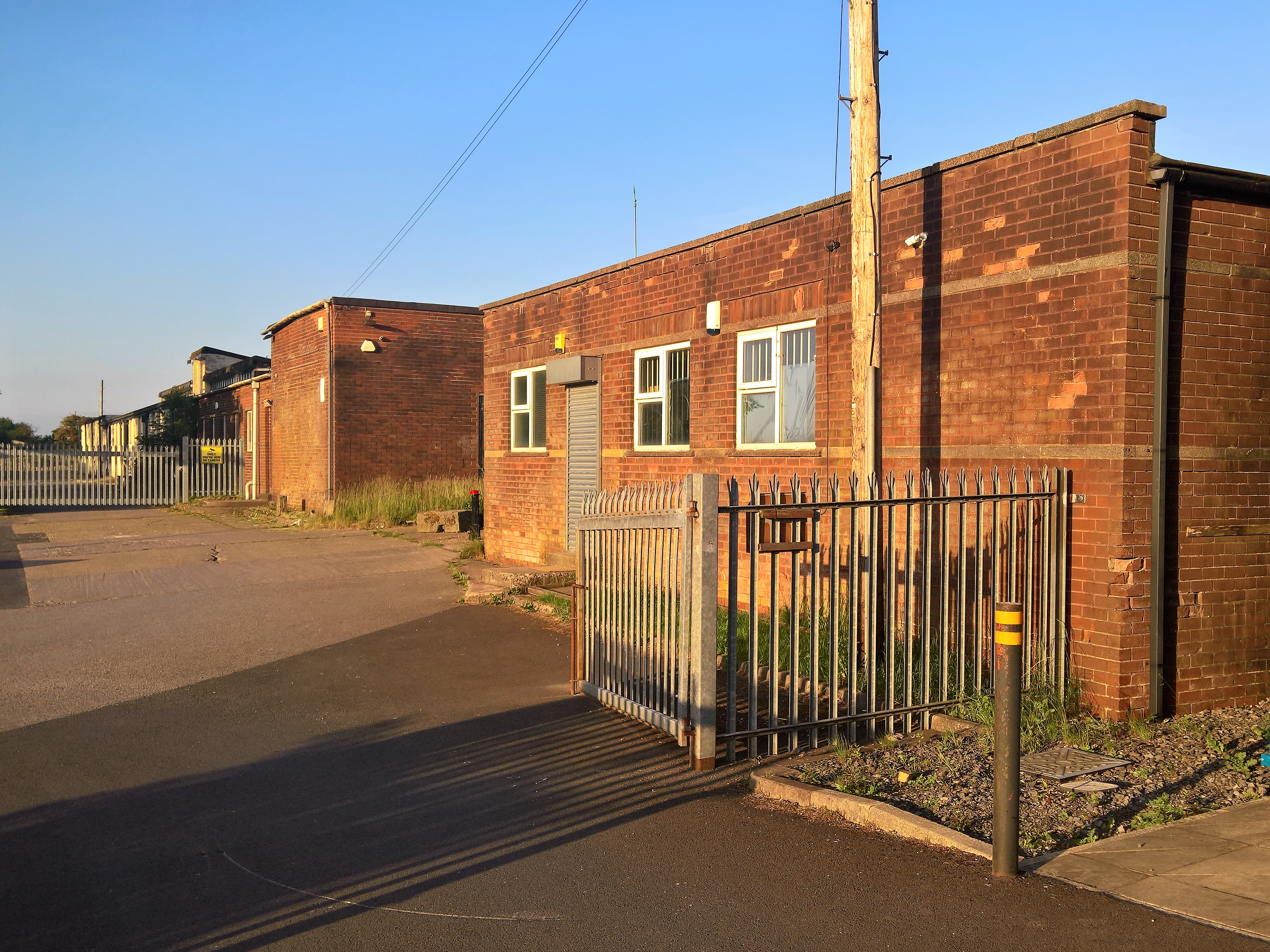
Buildings at the former Thorny Bank Colliery.

After nationalisation in 1947, the National Coal Board decided to develop Thorny Bank Colliery 53°46′19″N 2°18′58″W to the west which began operation in 1952, utilising the Thorney Bank Clough drift for ventilation. They still saw a future for Hapton Valley, and investment followed, moving its area of operation to the east. In the early 1950s new tub circuits with an increased capacity were installed and work on new drifts heading east from the pit bottom, cutting through the Deerplay Fault, was completed in 1954. The same year a 3300 volt, 200 horsepower electric winder replaced the old steam-driven one. In October 1957, work had to be stopped for several months on one of the new eastern faces after only two weeks in operation because of water ingress estimated at between 700 and 800 gallons per minute. Pumping equipment costing £10,000 was required to bring the problem under control. The ginny track system came to an end for the transport of coal in 1958 when it was replaced by a system of conveyors. (Note: The surface tracks did not appear on the 1961 Ordnance Survey map.) In 1961 one final 1,150 metres (1,260 yd) surface drift was cut and future operations were mechanised.

In 1962 the colliery employed 67 on the surface and 386 men below ground working two faces in the Union seam where production had increased to approximately 700 tons per day. No. 3 shaft was the main winding shaft, No. 4 was equipped with an electrically-driven exhausting fan and used for winding men only. A second exhaust fan was located about half a mile along the main return airway but its use was discontinued after the completion of the surface drift. The method employed at the time (longwall mining) involved digging two tunnels at either side of the coal face, the intake and return gates, for access and ventilation. To facilitate the placement of a conveyor and electric cutting machine, recesses were cut into each end of the face, known as stables. As the coal was removed and the conveyor advanced, the waste rock was packed into each side of the void and the props removed to allow the roof to cave-in in a controlled manner. The primary means of breaking rock and coal was explosive shot cartridges detonated in a series of boreholes. A coal plough was used in the Upper Mountain mine and an Anderton Shearer Loader in the Union. In 1978–79, the colliery's most productive year, 237,425 tonnes of coal were raised.

== Closure ==
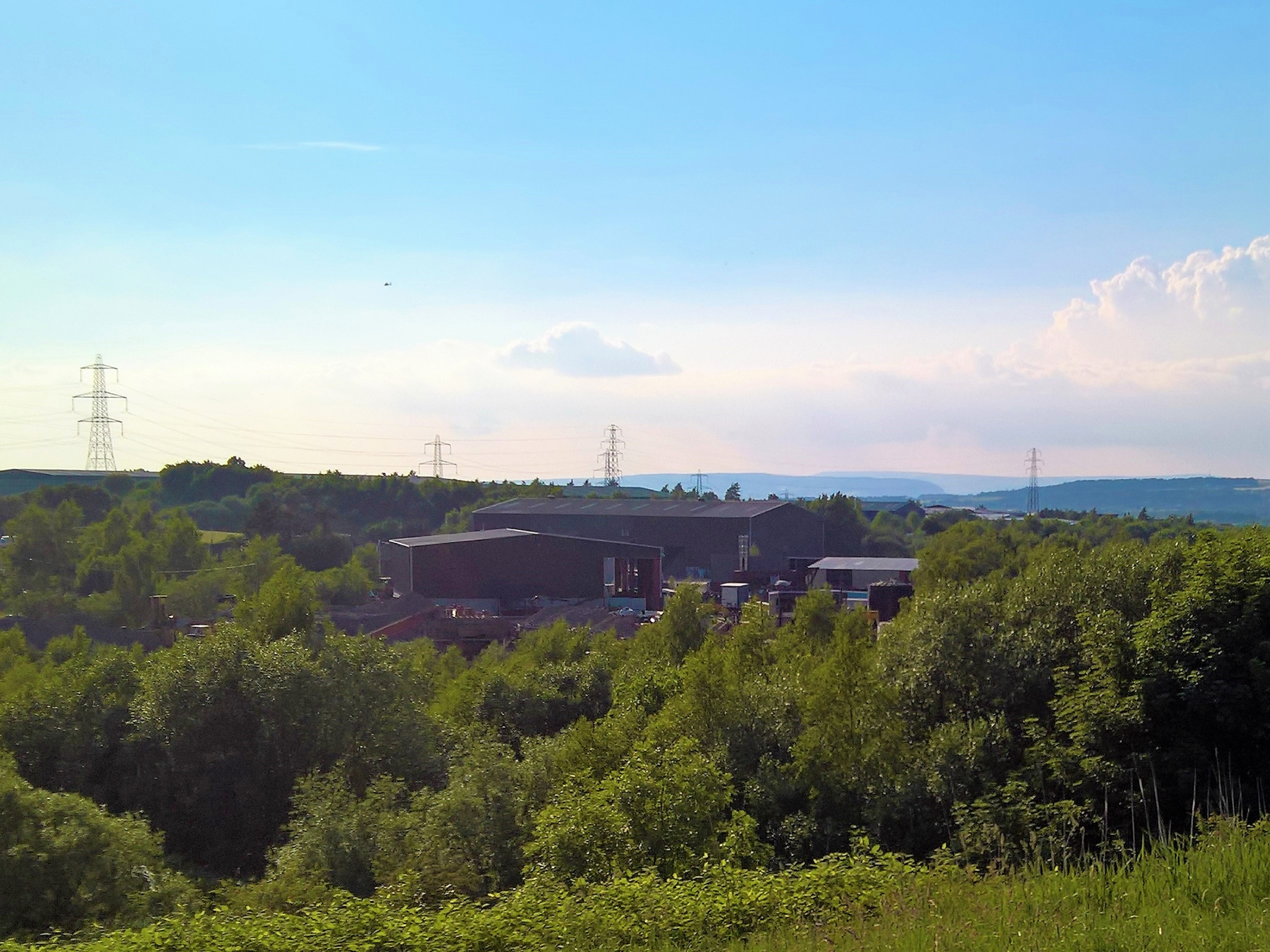
Buildings on the Hapton Valley site today.

Hapton Valley survived to be Burnley's last deep mine, operating into the 1980s. By this time the risks associated with mining near flooded workings was considered too great and Hapton Valley Colliery was closed on 26 April 1982. The winding gear was demolished at the start of 1983 but many surface buildings survived and the surface drift and shafts were capped. It has been estimated that the proximity of the Deerplay fault, which created a 450-metre-wide barren zone, effectively reduced the exploitable reserves by 1,500,000 tons.

== Incidents ==
A warning of the dangers of mining occurred in 1855, when a 14-year-old boy was killed and his two companions injured by an explosion that occurred when they entered one of the old workings using a candle for light. The seams worked at Hapton Valley were "gassy", with very high levels of firedamp recorded at the face. Although the use of powerful ventilation may have been linked to an increased occurrence of pneumoconiosis (miner's lung) in the Burnley Coalfield, no major explosions were recorded in the district until the 1960s. Occasional serious incidents had occurred such as the 1856 death of a banksman who was repairing the steam engine, and a fire which destroyed the winding house in 1908.

Two ignitions of gas occurred at number one coal face during the summer of 1960 and work there was subsequently discontinued. A third ignition occurred in the return gate stable on number two face on 4 April 1961. Then just after 9:45AM on 22 March 1962, an explosion in number two district killed 16 men instantly and 3 of the 16 seriously injured men died in hospital. The official report stated that the explosion likely caused by a firedamp ignition, possibly combined with coal dust, originating either in the return gate stable or at a point in the return gate between 165 to 256 metres (180 to 280 yd) from the face. While the ignition was probably the result of shotfiring, or from a flash produced by a thermite reaction involving aluminium foil and rusty iron, the source of the gas was not conclusively identified. The victims are remembered with plaques at St Mark's Church on Rossendale Road, and at Burnley Miners Club, which holds an annual reunion.

== See also ==
- Collieries in the Burnley area since 1854
- List of mining disasters in Lancashire
- Glossary of coal mining terminology
