= Towneley Colliery =

Coal mine in Burnley, England

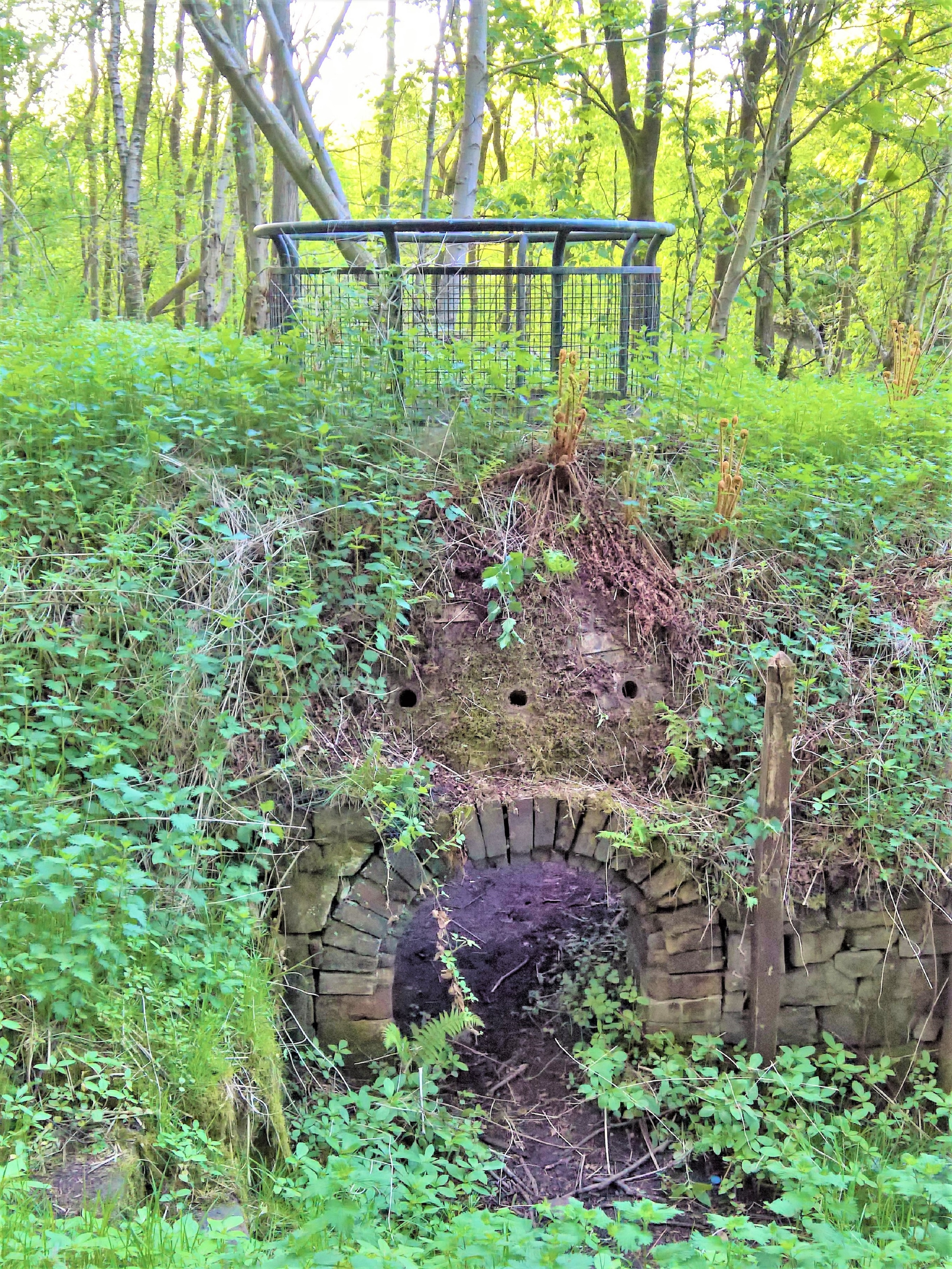
A re-built coke oven at the Towneley Colliery site.

Towneley Colliery or Towneley Desmesne was a coal mine on the Burnley Coalfield in Burnley, Lancashire, England. Sunk in the late 1860s, it was linked to the Lancashire and Yorkshire Railway's Burnley to Todmorden line which became known as the Copy Pit route and, by tramway, to the Leeds and Liverpool Canal.

Towneley Colliery was sunk next to Brooks and Pickup's fireclay works less than a half mile from Towneley railway station which served Towneley Hall. Brooks and Pickup began coal production from the main shaft, the Alice Pit in late February 1869. For 75 years coal was extracted from the Arley, Dandy, King and Yard mines. (Note: In this part of Lancashire a coal seam is referred to as a mine and the coal mine as a colliery or pit.) The colliery had sidings on either side of the Lancashire and Yorkshire Railway's Burnley to Todmorden line, the Copy Pit route. A half-mile long tramway linking it to the Leeds and Liverpool Canal had four tunnels. Boggart Brig Pit beside the A671 Todmorden Road was linked by a tramroad and was also linked underground. The pit was also linked underground to Bank Hall Colliery a half mile distant.

In 1923 the colliery was owned by Brooks & Brooks Collieries and employed 770 men working the colliery which included the Towneley Drift. In 1933 the Towneley Coal & Fireclay Company employed 672 men, 480 of them underground. The colliery produced fireclay as well as coal used for household and manufacturing use, coking and for producing gas.

The colliery was nationalised in 1947 after which the National Coal Board worked the Yard, Dandy and Lower Mountain mines. Its satellite pits, Dyneley Knoll (53°45′14″N 2°12′47″W), Boggart Brig (53°46′16″N 2°13′41″W) and Park Pits (53°46′19″N 2°12′36″W) closed in 1947 and were abandoned in 1949. The colliery closed on 6 March 1949. Its shafts were used for pumping until 1971 when Bank Hall Colliery closed. Little remains of the colliery, a residential development occupies a small part of the site and the rest comprises steep, mossy hillocks and woodland. A small replica brick kiln was built on a hillock to commemorate the colliery's brickworks.

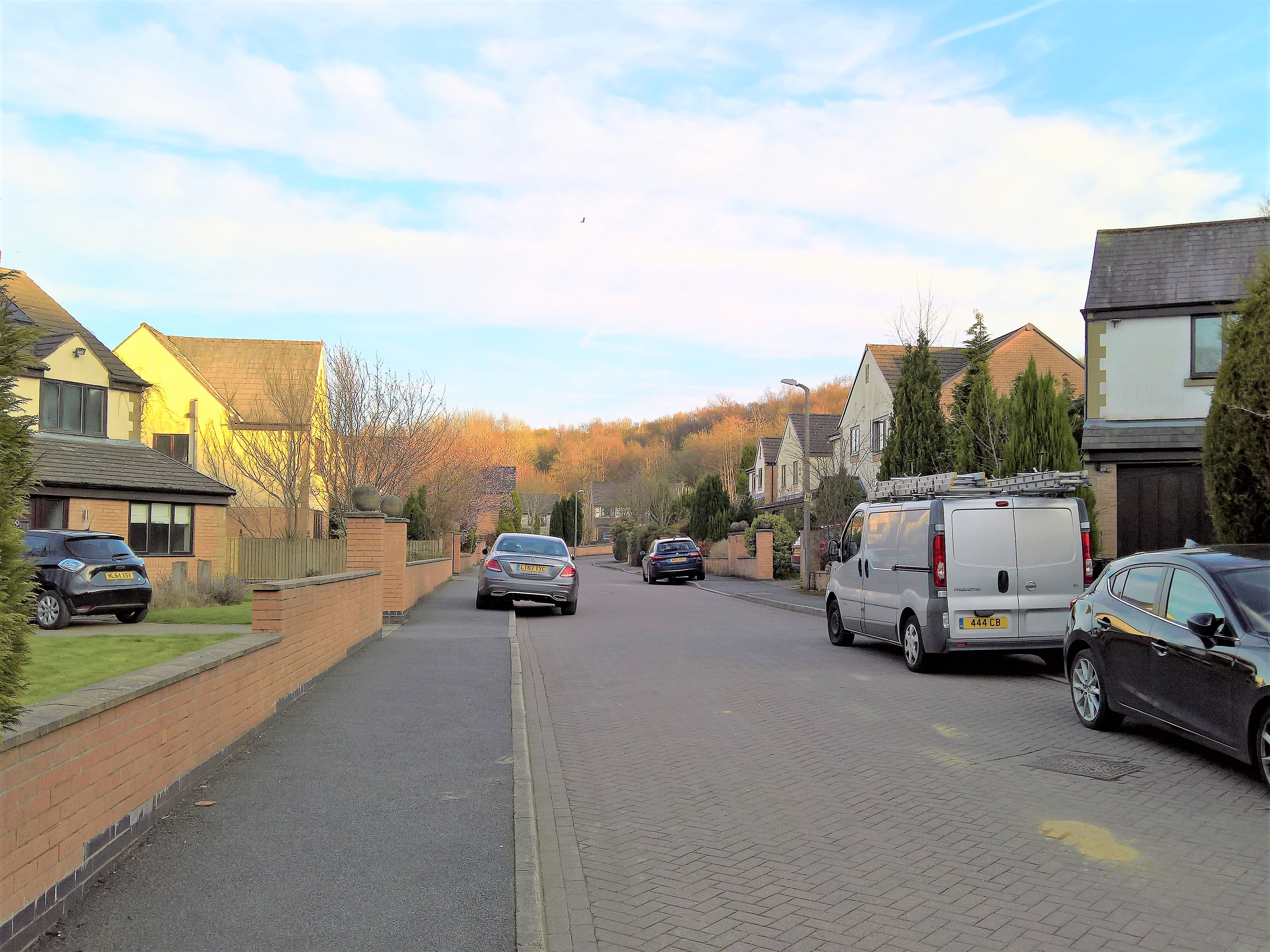
The Kilns residential development, covering part of the site.

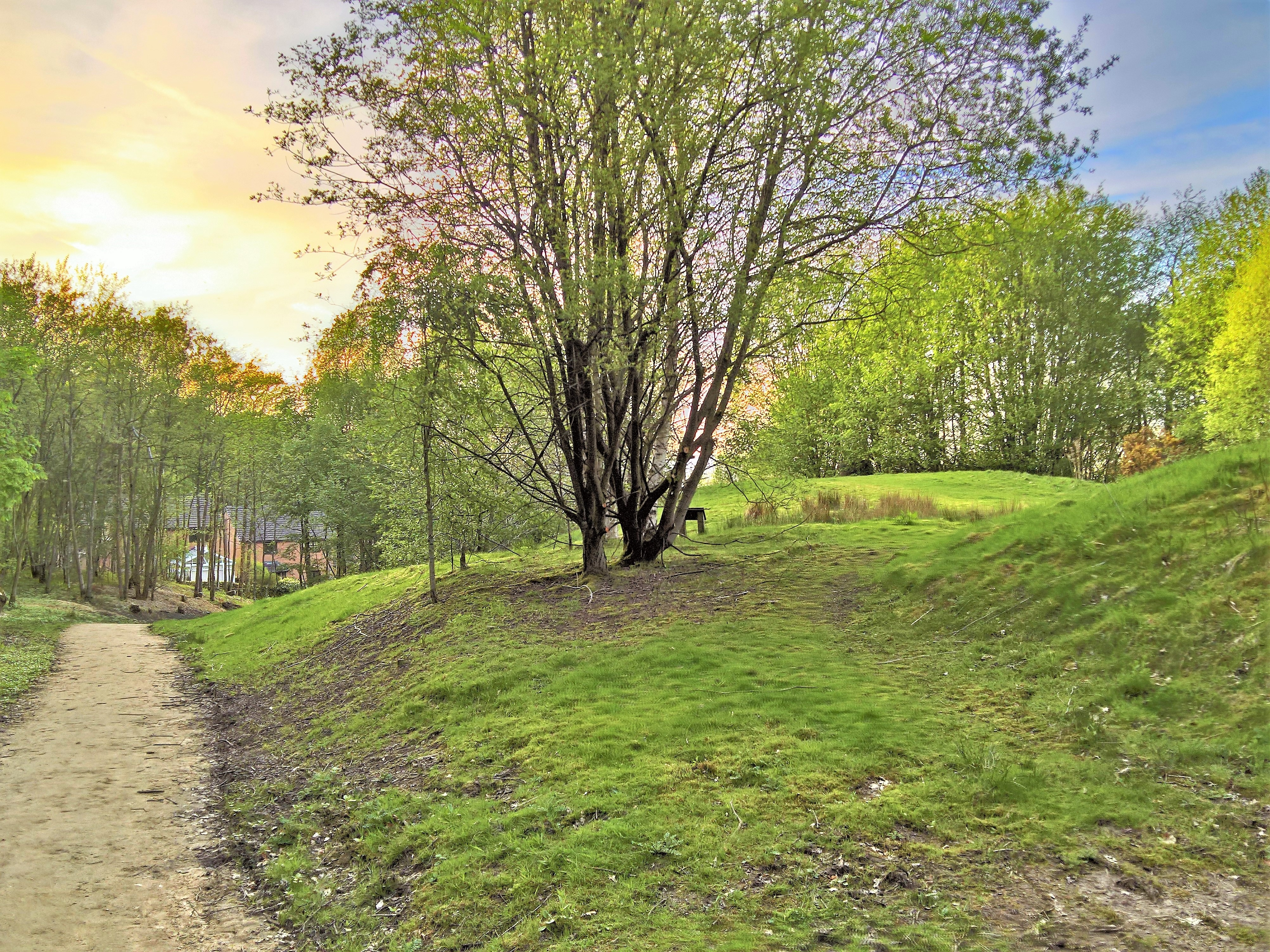
This greenspace was the location of the pithead buildings.

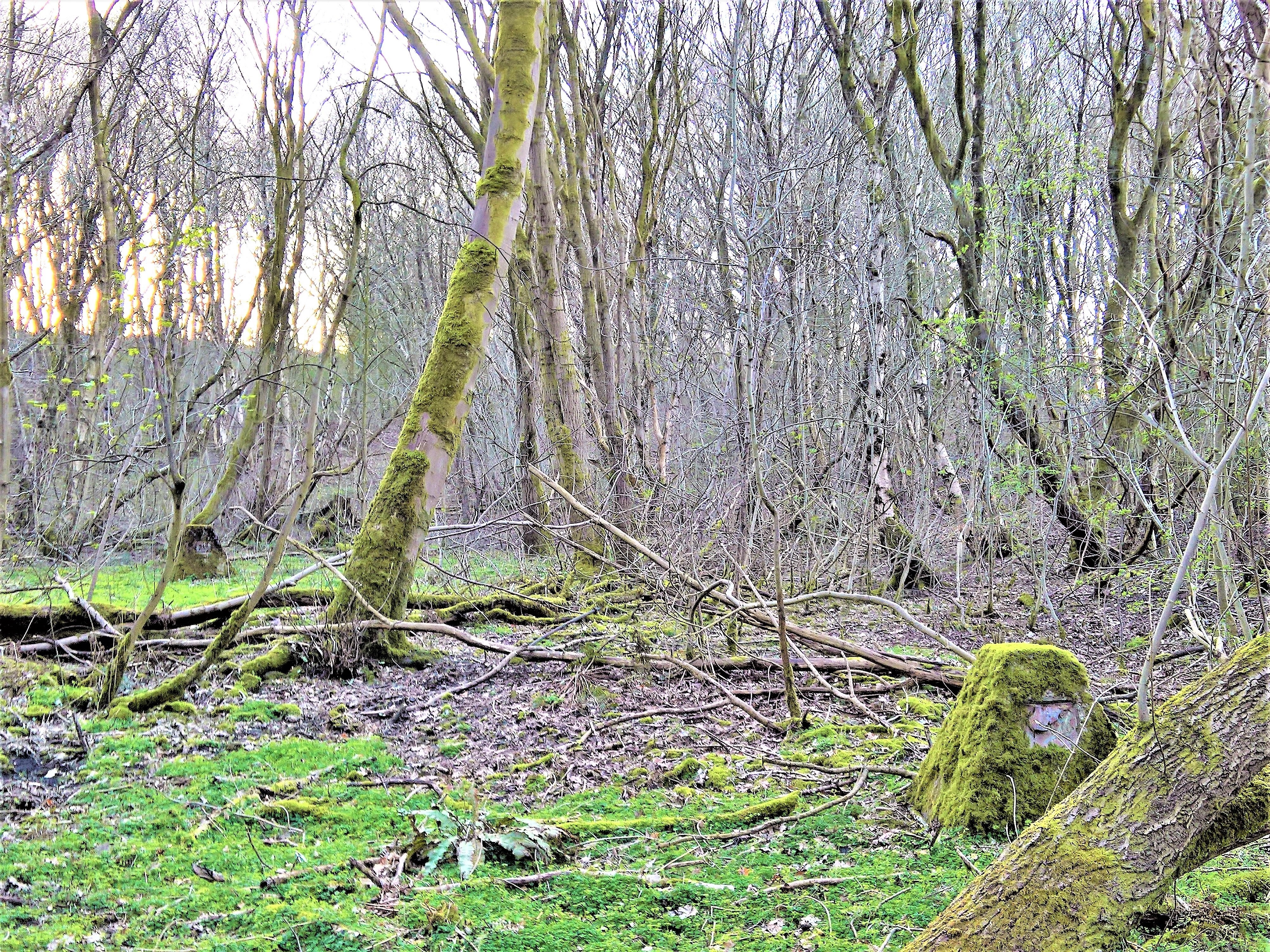
Shaft markers at Boggart Brig.

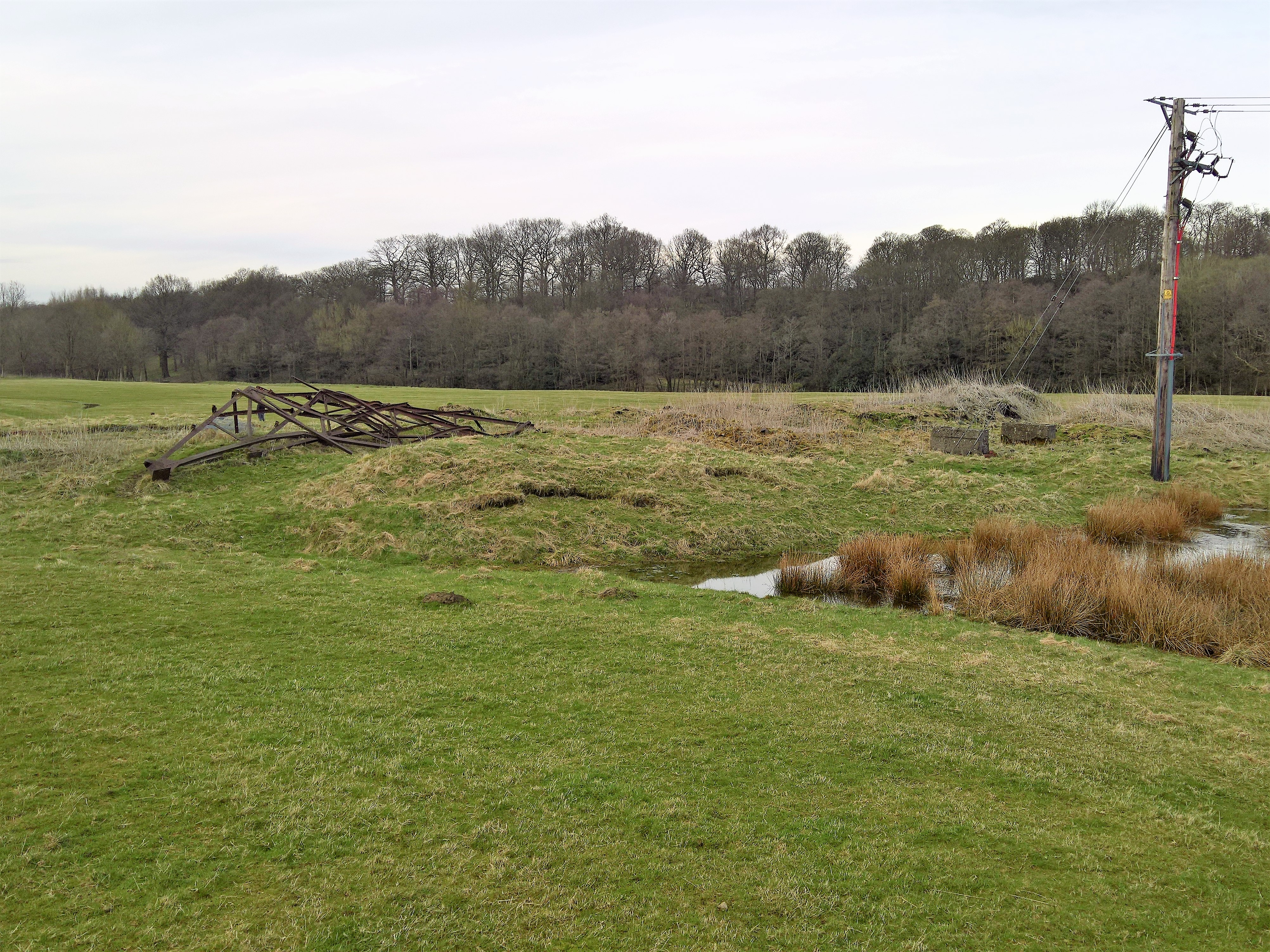
The remains of Park Pit in an ancient field called the Long Ing.
