= Hill Top Colliery =

Coal mine in Lancashire, England

Coordinates: 53.727942°N 2.167291°W

The Hill Top Colliery in Sharneyford between Bacup and Todmorden was, until 2014, the last coal mine still in operation in Lancashire.

== Foundation ==
The Hill Top Colliery was opened in 1948. In 1948, the National Coal Board built two drifts leading downwards into the average 1.40 metres (4 feet 7 inches) thick Union coal seam. Under the National Coal Board it employed from 1950 to 1965 on average 101 men underground and 9 above. At its peak there worked about 200 miners.

== Drifts ==
The Intake Drift with a 1 to 1½ (66%) grade was 78 meters long, while the lesser steep Return Drift was 339 meters long at a 1 to 4 (25%) grade. The rails of the plateways consisted of L-shaped steel profiles with a gauge of probably 3 feet (910 mm). The cart of the winch-operated incline had flangeless metal disc wheels and were also used for passenger transport, because of the low height of the drifts. They were pushed in the plane by hand and driven on downhill slopes with winches. Some of the numerous carts were probably acquired second-hand from the disused Old Meadows Colliery.

== Employees ==
The nearby Moorfield Colliery in Accrington was closed shortly after the nationalization in 1947, after which many of the formerly employed miners worked in the Hill Top Colliery. In less than 20 years they have produced 400 tons of coal per week before the mighty Union seam was exhausted in 1966. The coal had a relatively high sulfur content and was therefore sold mainly to the chemical industry in Widnes.

== Drainage ==
Powerful pumps, running day and night, were supplied with electrical power via an overhead line belonging to the mine. They pumped just over 1,000 liters (250 gallons) per minute out of the Hill Top Colliery and across the watershed of the Heald Moor into the Irwell Valley and not via the Greens Clough into the Yorkshire Calder, which would have been the far cheaper alternative.

== Temporary closure and reopening ==
In 1966, the mine was closed after the coal deposits seemed to be exhausted. The Grimebridge Colliery Co Ltd, led by miners William (Billy) Clayton and his business partner Rodney Mitchall, obtained a license to exploit Hill Top Colliery and opened the pit again. In the summer of 1997 two drifts were dug into the large seam between the previous tunnels and an open pit mine on the Heald Moor. The planning permission for the construction of the two new drifts was granted in August 1989. However, the start of construction was delayed, so that in 1997 an application for renewal of this permit was made and approved. In September 2005, a permit was granted for the continuation of mining until August 2011.

== Coal deposits ==
The coal reserves, extend underground over a working area of about 9 hectares. In 1997, the coal authority granted a license to mine 110,000 tonnes of coal. Although about 150,000 tonnes of coal were still available, only less than 50 tonnes were mined in 2003 due to staff shortages. Four miners, who worked only in the morning in the mine, promoted until October 2011, only 2900 tonnes of coal.

== Change of ownership ==
Billy Clayton died unexpectedly of a heart attack on 16 May 2008, when he brought his grandson back from school. Then his equally named son Billy Clayton son took over the operation of the mine until it was closed in 2014.

== Health and safety ==
In December 2016, the state Health and Safety Executive issued a prohibition notice to warn about the risk of water leakage and an improvement notice suggestion regarding the requirement for regular expert assessments of the compressor.

== Coal balls ==
In Lancashire, especially in the Burnley area, peat concretions are known as coal balls or colloquially as Burnley bobbers. They are particularly common in the seams of the Upper Foot Mine and Lower Mountain Mine in East Lancashire but also in the mines in Todmorden Moor on the eastern edge of this coal field. Due to their hardness, they often caused damage to the mining equipment, as well as the picks, drums and cutting jibs in the coal mines in North East Lancashire. In the mines of Todmorden Moor the coal balls were common. Some were collected by the locals from the waste heaps because of the petrifactions, others are still there.
