= Sharneyford =

Hamlet in Lancashire, England

Coordinates: 53.715°N 2.180°W

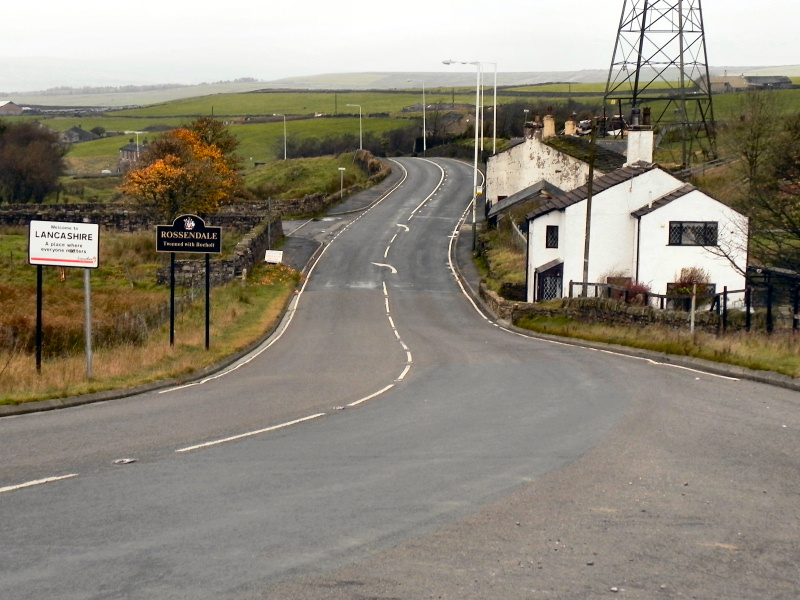
- Todmorden Road (A681)

- Location within Rossendale Location within Lancashire
- OS grid reference: SD881243
- District: Rossendale
- Shire county: Lancashire
- Region: North West
- Country: England
- Sovereign state: United Kingdom
- Post town: BACUP
- Postcode district: OL13
- Dialling code: 01706
- Police: Lancashire
- Fire: Lancashire
- Ambulance: North West
- UK Parliament: Rossendale and Darwen

Sharneyford is a hamlet in Lancashire, England, on the A681 road between Bacup and Todmorden. It is home to one of the smallest schools in Britain, Sharneyford Primary School. Sharneyford Mill, located north of the school, was once the highest in England, at around 1,250 feet (380 m) above sea level; it has now been demolished. Further up the hill there was a chapel, which was replaced by church further down the hill; the chapel became an engine-house for the railway that provided transport to and from the mill, when the mill was destroyed, the engine-house was emptied and abandoned.
