= Gambleside =

- abandoned village
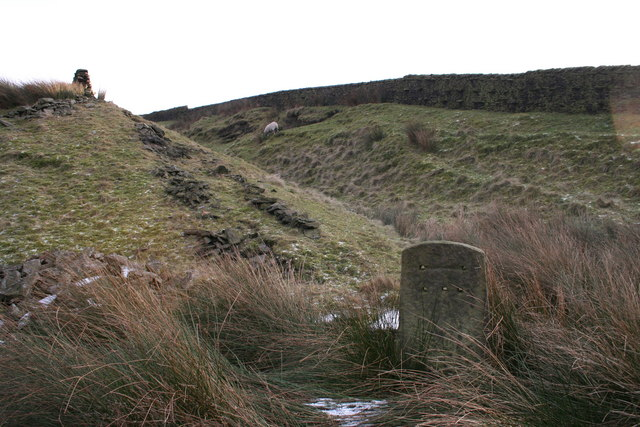
- Limersgate in Gambleside, 2009
- Interactive map of Gambleside
- Coordinates: 53.746°N 2.259°W
- Country: England
- County: Lancashire
- District: Rossendale

Population
  - Total: 0

Gambleside is an abandoned village located in northern Rossendale close to the boundary with Burnley's Dunnockshaw civil parish.

In the late Middle Ages Gambleside was one of the cow farms (vaccary) of the Rossendale Forest, belonging to the Honour of Clitheroe. In 1507 the land was demised as a copyhold to Oliver and George Ormerode at a rent of £4 per year.

Historically the Gambleside area stretched from Limy Water southeast over the hills into the valley of Whitewell Brook, including land on the southern side of Clough Bottom Reservoir. It formed part of the township of Higher Booths in the ancient parish of Whalley, which became a civil parish in 1866. In 1894, with the creation of Rawtenstall municipal borough this part of Higher Booths was incorporated into it.

The settlement was located on a limersgate, a pathway used by pack horses carrying lime, which linked Clitheroe to Rochdale.

Gambleside Colliery was established in 1612 and was worked for over 300 years until 1936. It had two main shafts, a winding shaft on the hillside and Pumping Pit.

The population began to decline after the building of the Clowbridge Reservoir in 1866, which restricted farming in the village. The Ormerod Family continued to live there until about 1874, with the village abandoned during the 1890s.
