= Harry Hague =

British Recorder of the Crown Court and Liberal politician

Harry Hague (9 April 1922 – 1985), was a British Recorder of the Crown Court and a Liberal Party politician. At the 1962 Blackpool North by-election he achieved a 17% swing that was the first step on a course that led to the Night of the Long Knives when Prime Minister Harold Macmillan dismissed one-third of his Cabinet.

== Background ==
Hague was the son of Sir Harry Hague and Lilian Hindle of Stalybridge and Blackpool. He was educated at Arnold School, Blackpool, Manchester University and London University, LLB degree at London. In 1967 he married Vera Smith. They had two step daughters.

== Professional career ==
Before the war Hague worked for the Blackpool Education Department and in a Blackpool bank. He joined the Army in 1941. He was discharged in March 1944, after injury to a leg during an assault course. He was Called to Bar by the Middle Temple in 1946. He worked as a barrister on the Northern Circuit. He was Assistant Recorder of Burnley from 1969 to 1971. He was a Recorder of the Crown Court from 1972 to 1979.

== Political career ==
In the 1940s Hague joined the Liberal party and was a candidate in the Blackpool Municipal Elections. He was Chairman of Blackpool South Liberal Association. He was President of the Lancashire and Cheshire Young Liberal Federation. He became a member of Liberal Party Council. He was Liberal candidate for the new Blackburn East division of Lancashire at the 1950 General Election. Blackburn was unpromising territory for a Liberal and the party had polled poorly there in 1945. 1950 was little different;

General Election 1950:
Party	Candidate	Votes	%	±%
Labour	Barbara Anne Castle	19,480	52.8	n/a
Conservative	John Anthony Leavey	14,662	39.8	n/a
Liberal	Harry Hague	2,743	7.4	n/a
Majority		4,818	13.0	n/a
Turnout			89.1	n/a
Labour win				

He was a member of the Liberal Party National Executive from 1956 to 1959. He was Liberal candidate for one of his hometown seats, the safe Tory Blackpool North division of Lancashire at the 1959 General Election. The Liberals had not run a candidate here since 1945, yet he still managed to poll a respectable vote;

General Election 1959: Blackpool North
Party	Candidate	Votes	%	±%
Conservative	Toby Austin Richard William Low	25,297	57.9	−13.3
Labour	William H Dugdale	9,440	21.6	−7.2
Liberal	Harry Hague	8,990	20.6	N/A
Majority		15,857	36.3	
Turnout		43,727	76.6	+9.7
Conservative hold		Swing	−3.1	

In 1962 his victorious Tory opponent at Blackpool North was given a peerage which meant that a by-election had to take place. The by-election was expected to deliver another easy Tory win but Hague's campaign almost pulled off a surprise victory;

1962 Blackpool North by-election
Party	Candidate	Votes	%	±%
Conservative	Norman Alexander Miscampbell	12,711	38.3	−19.6
Liberal	Harry Hague	11,738	35.3	+14.7
Labour	Shirley Catherine Wynne Summerskill	8,776	26.4	+4.8
Majority		973	2.9	
Turnout		33,225		
Conservative hold		Swing		

The following day voters went to the polls in the 1962 Orpington by-election which delivered the Liberals a famous victory. Then followed a string of strong Liberal electoral performances that resulted in 4 months later in Harold Macmillan sacking a third of his cabinet. Hague was once again a member of the Liberal Party National Executive from 1962 to 1964. He fought Blackpool North for a third time at the 1964 elections. However, since 1962, support for the Tories had rallied and he again finished second;

General Election 1964: Blackpool North
Party	Candidate	Votes	%	±%
Conservative	Norman Alexander Miscampbell	19,633	47.2	+8.9
Liberal	Harry Hague	11,462	27.5	−7.8
Labour	Thomas McKellar	10,543	25.3	−1.1
Majority		8,171	19.6	+16.7
Turnout		41,638	74.7	
Conservative hold		Swing	+8.3	

He did not stand for parliament again.
