= Harold Derbyshire =

English barrister, judge and politician (1886–1972)

Sir Harold Derbyshire MC, QC
- Derbyshire in 1928

9th Chief Justice of Calcutta High Court
- In office 22 October 1934 – 1946
- Appointed by: George V
- Preceded by: George Claus Rankin
- Succeeded by: Arthur Trevor Harries

Personal details
- Born: 25 December 1886 Cherry Tree, Lancashire
- Died: 14 September 1972 (aged 85)
- Education: LL.B
- Alma mater: Sidney Sussex College, Cambridge

Sir Harold Derbyshire MC QC (25 December 1886 – 14 September 1972) was an English barrister, judge and Liberal Party politician.

== Background and education ==
Derbyshire was born in Cherry Tree, Blackburn, Lancashire, England, the son of James Derbyshire and Elizabeth Kate Chew. He was educated at Queen Elizabeth's Grammar School, Blackburn, and then on a scholarship at Sidney Sussex College, Cambridge, where he studied Natural Sciences. He afterwards gained an LLB.

In 1915 he married Dorothea Alice Taylor in Blackburn.

== Legal career ==
Derbyshire was admitted to Gray's Inn, where he was called to the Bar in 1911. He practised on the Northern Circuit and was made a KC in 1928. He was elected a Bencher of Gray's Inn in 1931. From 1933-34 he served as Judge of Appeal in the Isle of Man. From 1934 to 1946 he was Chief Justice at the High Court of Calcutta in British India. In 1948 he was the Inn's Treasurer.

He retired from public life in 1950.

== Military service ==
Derbyshire served with distinction during World War I in the Royal Artillery in France and Belgium, and was awarded the Military Cross in the 1918 Birthday Honours.

== Political service ==
In the 1923 General Election he contested the seat of Clitheroe and in the 1929 General Election that of Royton, standing for the Liberal Party, but was unsuccessful on both occasions.

=== Electoral record ===
General election 1923: Clitheroe
Party	Candidate	Votes	%	±%
Unionist	William Brass	12,998	42.9	−11.8
Labour	Alfred Davies	11,469	37.9	−7.4
Liberal	Harold Derbyshire	5,810	19.2	n/a
Majority		1,529	5.0	−4.4
Turnout		30,277	88.2	+2.9
Registered electors		34,329		
Unionist hold		Swing	−2.2	

General election 1929: Royton
Party	Candidate	Votes	%	±%
Unionist	Arthur Vernon Davies	15,051	38.4	−5.6
Liberal	Harold Derbyshire	13,347	34.1	−2.3
Labour	Albert Ernest Wood	10,763	27.5	+7.9
Majority		1,704	4.3	−3.3
Turnout		39,161	82.9	−3.4
Registered electors		47,266		
Unionist hold		Swing	−1.7	

== Sources ==
- Who Was Who, vol. 7: 1971-80. A & C Black and Oxford University Press

Legal offices
Preceded by Sir George Claus Rankin	Chief Justice of Bengal; 1934–1946	Succeeded by Sir Arthur Trevor Harries
