= Harold Sutcliffe =

British politician and businessman

Sir Harold Sutcliffe (11 December 1897 – 20 January 1958) was a British Conservative Party politician and businessman.

Born in Yorkshire, he was educated at Harrow and then Oriel College, Oxford.

During the First World War, in which he was badly gassed, he served in the Royal Field Artillery and in 1925 was called to the Bar at Inner Temple.

He became an expert in the cotton trade and became a prominent figure in the City of London. In 1931 he was elected Member of Parliament for Royton. He held the seat until it was abolished in 1950, when he was elected for the new Heywood and Royton (UK Parliament constituency) constituency which he held until 1955. He lived at Mayroyd, Hebden Bridge. He was regularly financially supported by Yorkshire businesses sympathetic to the Conservative Party including - in July 1947 - members of the medical and legal fraternity such as Leeds solicitors Middleton & Sons as well as councillors and auditors in Barnsley and Hebden Bridge. Another supporter, Sir George Martin, Lord Mayor of Leeds (1946–47) was, like Sutcliffe, a member of the Conservative Party.

Described by The Times as 'never a very conspicuous figure at Westminster' and 'a persuasive rather than a demonstrative speaker', Sutcliffe became Parliamentary Private Secretary to William Mabane in 1939, then Parliamentary Under-Secretary of State to Osbert Peake first at the Home Office in 1942, then the Treasury and finally, after the 1951 general election, at the Ministry of National Insurance. He was knighted in 1953.

He married Theodora Cochrane in 1926 and they had four children. One son, John, later became a Member of Parliament.

Parliament of the United Kingdom
Preceded by Arthur Vernon Davies	Member of Parliament for Royton; 1931–1950	Constituency abolished
New constituency	Member of Parliament for Heywood and Royton; 1950–1955	Succeeded by Tony Leavey
