= Wilfrid Sugden =

British politician

Sir Wilfrid Hart Sugden (8 December 1879 – 27 April 1960) was a Conservative Party politician in the United Kingdom. A Member of Parliament (MP) for fourteen years, he represented three different constituencies, losing his seat twice and losing in three other elections which he contested.

== Early life and career ==
Sugden was born in Bolton, Lancashire, the son of William Arthur and Isabella Sugden. He was educated at London University and abroad. He became a constructional engineer and served in the Royal Engineers during the First World War.

Sugden changed course later in life, being called to the Bar by the Middle Temple in 1928, when he was nearing 50.

== Political life ==
He was elected at the 1918 general election as MP for Royton in Lancashire. He was returned with a reduced majority at the 1922 election, but was defeated at the 1923 general election by the Liberal Party candidate William Gorman.

Sugden returned to Parliament at the 1924 general election as MP for the marginal The Hartlepools, where he defeated the sitting Liberal MP William Jowitt.

At the 1929 general election, he did not seek re-election in The Hartlepools, where the Liberals regained the seat. Instead, he contested Rossendale in Lancashire, where the Conservative MP Robert Waddington had stood down. Sugden was defeated again, winning 30.1% of the votes in a tight three-way contest; he polled only 2,399 votes less than the successful Labour candidate Arthur Law.

The Labour party's vote collapsed at the 1931 general election after Prime Minister Ramsay MacDonald formed a National Government, splitting his party. Sugden contested the Labour-held marginal seat of Leyton West in London, where he was returned to the House of Commons with a majority of nearly 10,000. However, he was ousted again at the 1935 general election, when Labour's Rev. Reginald Sorensen was returned with a majority of only 128.

He then contested the Islington North constituency, at a by-election in 1937 following the death of the Conservative MP Albert Goodman. He lost again, on a swing of 6.9% against the Conservatives.

Sugden's last electoral contest was at the 1945 general election, in the Labour-held constituency of Manchester Platting. Labour held the seat with a majority of over 7,000.

Parliament of the United Kingdom
New constituency	Member of Parliament for Royton; 1918–1923	Succeeded by William Gorman
Preceded by William Jowitt	Member of Parliament for The Hartlepools; 1924–1929	Succeeded by W. G. Howard Gritten
Preceded by Reginald Sorensen	Member of Parliament for Leyton West; 1931–1935	Succeeded by Reginald Sorensen
