= Select Committee on Overseas Trade =

Former select committee of the UK House of Lords

The Select Committee on Overseas Trade was a select committee of the House of Lords that sat from 1984 to 1985. The committee was chaired by Lord Aldington and was described by one peer as "the most comprehensive survey of the British industrial scene since the Second World War".

== Background ==
During the early 1980s recession the surplus in the balance of trade had turned into a deficit of £2.4 billion for 1983, £3.8 billion for 1984 and £2 billion for the first half of 1985. This had been covered by North Sea oil, which contributed £6.8 billion in 1983, £7.1 billion for 1984 and £4.2 billion for the first half of 1985.

== Report ==
The unanimous view of the committee, as expressed in its Report (published on 15 October 1985), was that unless there was a change in attitude towards manufacturing industry Britain faced a political, economic and social crisis. The Report warned that Britain needed to expand its declining manufacturing base to combat the fall in revenue from North Sea oil. If there were no change in economic policy a growing balance of payments deficit would lead to harsh deflationary measures along with lower tax revenues, meaning less spent on public services and defence. The Report also predicted higher unemployment, a stagnating economy, rising inflation and an irreplaceable loss of GDP. The Report added:

The committee takes the view that, together, these prospects constitute a grave threat to the standard of living of the British people. Failure to recognize these dangers now could have a devastating effect on the future economic and political stability of the nation. The situation in which we find ourselves is not self-correcting: things will not come right of their own accord. Urgent action is required, not only by government but by everyone.

The Report quoted an article in the Lloyds Bank Economic Bulletin of September 1984 that predicted Britain's current account would change from a £1 billion surplus for that year to a deficit of £13.6 billion in 1990. The Report claimed that services were not a substitute for manufacturing "because many services are dependent on manufacturing and only 20 per cent of services are tradeable overseas". They also warned that there was no reason to expect an "automatic" revival of manufacturing to compensate for the decline of the oil surplus because lost export markets would be difficult to recover. Manufacturing would take years to recover: "New industries and new products usually grow out of long-established activities and require a long time-scale for development".

== Response ==
The Secretary of State for Trade and Industry, Leon Brittan, took what The Times called the "unprecedented step" of pre-empting the publication of the Report by releasing a statement: "This report needs to be set in perspective if we are not to get a totally biased and misleading view of the performance and prospects of our economy". The Shadow Chancellor, Roy Hattersley, responded by saying the "select committee's view of what will happen to this country if we do not act before the oil runs out confirms exactly what we have been saying in speech after speech for years".

In his Mansion House speech for 1985 the Chancellor of the Exchequer, Nigel Lawson, dismissed the Report: "The Government...wholly rejects the mixture of special pleading dressed up as analysis and assertion masquerading as evidence which leads the Committee to its doom-laden conclusion". In his evidence to the Committee Lawson claimed: "There is no adamantine law that says we have to produce as much in the way of manufactures as we consume...If it does turn out that we are relatively more efficient in world terms at providing services than at producing goods, then our national interest lies in a surplus on services and a deficit on goods".

The Report was debated in the House of Lords on 3 December 1985. On 21 October 1987 Lord Beaverbrook claimed that the Report had "largely been discredited by events". This led to a further debate on the Report in November 1987, where Lord Aldington contested Beaverbrook's statement.

The Report ran through five editions and has been used as a teaching aid in universities.
