= Tony Leavey =

British politician (1915–1999)

John Anthony Leavey (3 March 1915 – 9 July 1999) was a British company director and Conservative politician.

== Family business ==
Leavey's father George was chairman of Smith & Nephew, then an engineering firm which had not yet specialised in medical devices. He went to Mill Hill School and then Trinity Hall, Cambridge, before returning to east Lancashire where he became a director of companies involved in the weaving and matchmaking industries in Colne and Rawtenstall.

== War service ==
As the Second World War loomed, Leavey joined up and served in the 5th Royal Inniskilling Dragoon Guards in France and Belgium. He was one of the last to be evacuated in the Dunkirk evacuation. On arriving back in Britain the regiment underwent training in the midlands, where Leavey organised a pack of hounds with which to go fox hunting. He returned to take part in the liberation of France after D Day, and fought until the end of the war. He was mentioned in despatches, and reached the rank of major. After demobilisation in 1946, Leavey was employed by the family firm of Smith and Nephew, and became a director in 1948. He joined the Yorkshire Hussars in the Territorial Army as a major in 1952, leaving in 1955.

== Politics ==
At the 1950 and 1951 UK general elections Leavey stood, unsuccessfully, as Conservative candidate against Labour MP Barbara Castle in Blackburn East.

== Parliamentary career ==
In 1955 Leavey was selected for, and elected to Heywood and Royton, whose Conservative MP was retiring. He strongly supported the government over the Suez Crisis and attacked nearby Labour MPs for supporting Gamal Abdel Nasser, being rewarded with appointment as Parliamentary Private Secretary to defence minister Walter Monckton for one year from 1956 and later to chancellor Derick Heathcoat Amory in 1959; however, his loyalty did not stretch to accepting what he saw as government indifference to the local cotton industry. When his pressure resulted in the passing of the Cotton Industry Act 1959, it was felt to have aided his campaign locally, but in 1962 he was one of five Conservative MPs to support a Labour motion of censure on the subject.

Some of Leavey's campaigns attracted attention, with his call for an end to the teaching of Latin in schools among them. He was insistent that he knew there had been flying saucers over Lancashire, and wanted girls who went topless to be arrested. He supported Anthony Wedgwood Benn in his campaign to allow peers to renounce their titles. In 1961 he was made Secretary to the 1922 Committee of Conservative backbenchers.

When prime minister Harold Macmillan sacked seven members of his cabinet in the "Night of the Long Knives" in 1962, Leavey praised him for being ruthless with colleagues when necessary. In the 1964 general election he narrowly lost his seat to Labour, which had targeted it.

== Business appointments ==
After leaving Parliament he continued to work for Smith and Nephew, and was appointed deputy chairman in 1962, and also chairman of Wilson (Connolly) Holdings, a midlands-based firm of builders. He had other business interests, and was a member of the South East London Industrial Tribunal from 1978 to 1984. In 1982 he and Richard Bennett wrote an official history of Smith and Nephew from its foundation in 1856.

== Recreations ==
Enthusiastic about country activities, Leavey continued fox-hunting and also took part in point-to-point horse races. He was a council member of the Outward Bound Trust from 1974 to 1992 and also became a trustee of the Kurt Hahn Trust in 1987. He also enjoyed fishing.

Parliament of the United Kingdom
Preceded by Sir Harold Sutcliffe	Member of Parliament for Heywood and Royton; 1955–1964	Succeeded by Joel Barnett
