= Mayroyd =

Hamlet in West Yorkshire, England

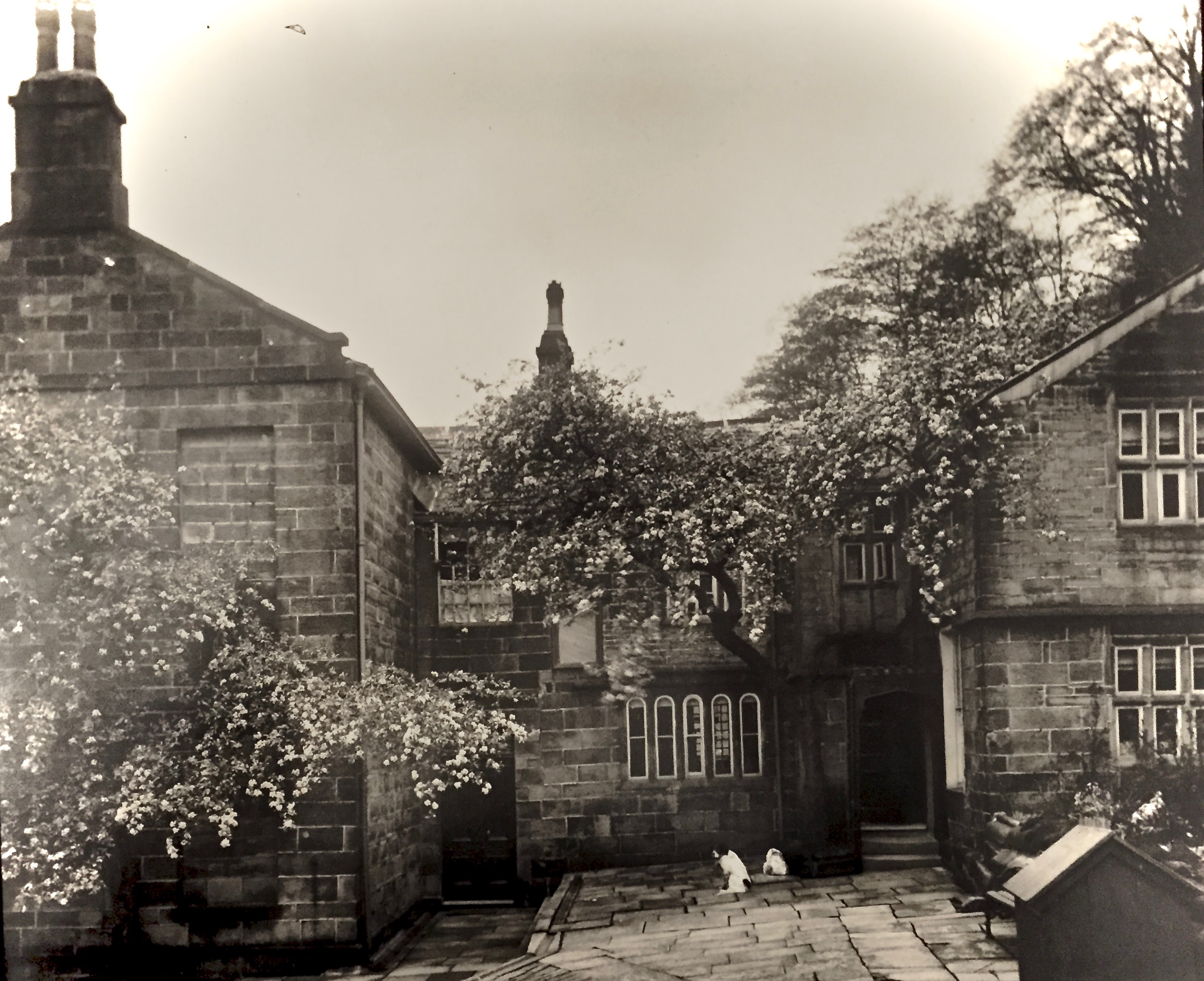
Mayroyd Hall in the early 19th century

Mayroyd is a hamlet in Hebden Bridge in West Yorkshire, England. It consists of Mayroyd Hall, a Grade II listed building, an associated 17th century cottage (also a Grade II listed building) and Mews. Its postal address is Mayroyd Hall, Mayroyd Lane, Hebden Bridge, Calderdale, West Yorkshire, HX7 8NU.

The first records on a building on the site of Mayroyd Hall was a farm-building called Thornhollin in 1399. By 1435, a larger manor house was established here by the name of Meherrode.

Mayroyd Hall itself was first built in the 15th century, it was rebuilt following a fire. The present building is an early 17th-century hall-and-cross-wing house. The oldest section of the house is Elizabethan, the more recent section is Georgian. It is typical of manor houses in this part of Yorkshire with mullion windows. The gardens have a number of examples of rare bee boles.

In the 16th and 17th century, the Hall was largely owned by the Sutcliffe family and later the Cockcroft Family.

Members of the families who are recorded here have included

- John de Wethelay [1434]
- Robert de Southclyff [1435]
- John Sutcliffe [1500s]
- Robert Sutcliffe [1530]
- Matthew Sutcliffe an English clergyman, academic and lawyer who was born here about 1550
- Adam Sutcliffe [1582]
- Brian Bentley [1584]

In the winter of 1643 when Yorkshire was largely the theatre of operations in the English civil war, Mayroyd was a stronghold for the royalists. At that time it belonged to the Cockcroft family, and in the 17th century, it was the home of William Cockcroft, Henry Cockcroft, William Cockcroft [1700], William Cockcroft, and Grace Cockroft [1745].

Several local attorneys – including Thomas Sayer and Robert Alcock - lived and practised here from the early 18th century.

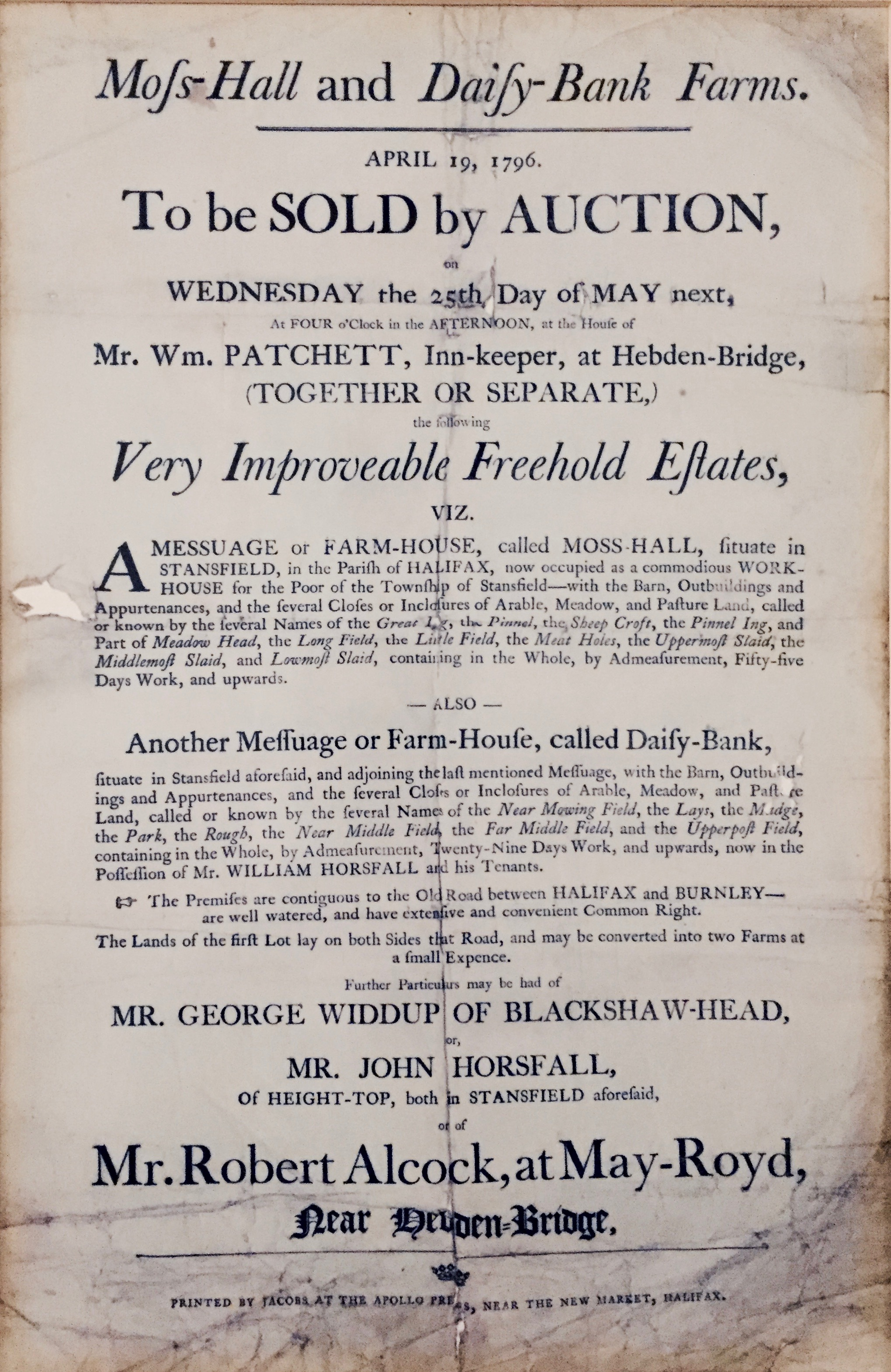
an auction of property - Robert Alcock of May-Royd 1796

Subsequent owners and tenants have included

- Rev John Crook [1834] who founded Hope Baptist Church in Hebden Bridge in 1858
- John Horsfall [1854] who founded the cloth factory at Calder Mill, John Horsfall & Sons
- James Sutcliffe-Thomas JP [1927]
- Sir Harold Sutcliffe [1950s] Conservative member of parliament

[[

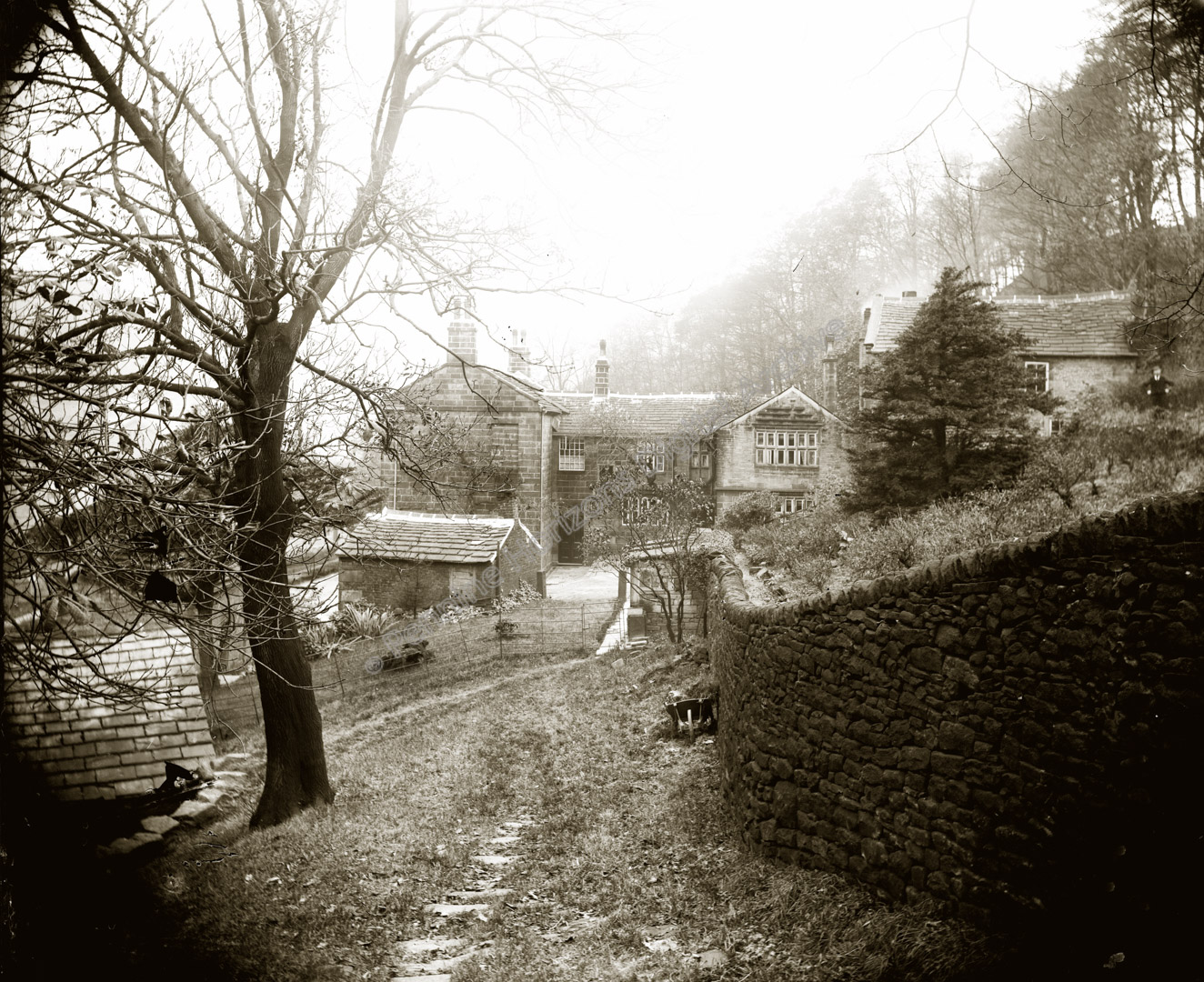
Mayroyd @1900

|thumb|Mayroyd Hall in 1900]]

These records are derived from late 19th century newspaper articles together with an abstract of a paper titled “Three Old Homesteads” by Mr J.H.Ogden, dated 1903.

Ogden says in early times the Mayroyd estate appears to have had the name of Thornhollin, not always, as with so many names, similarly spelt. A document, which evidently relates to the estate, dated the feast of St Thomas the Martyr in the first year of Henry IV [28 December 1399] reads as follows:- “Know all men present and future that I, Robert Mathewson of Illyngworth, give, concede, and by this my charter confirm to Richard, son of Henry Rowtenstall, one messuage built at Hepden- bryge, called Thyrneholin, Dodnas, and Pyper Stubbing, with one parcel of land, called Falloroyde, and one croft of pasture called Mayingcroft adjacent, under Brodbotham, above the River Calder in the town of Waddesworth.”. Dodnase is a nose-shaped piece of land to the north of Mayroyd, and adjoining the Burlees estate.

By 1435 a larger manor house was established here by the name of Meherrode. Mayroyd Hall was first built in the15th century. It was rebuilt following a fire. The present building is an early 17th century hall and cross-wing house. The oldest part of the house is Elizabethan, typical of manor houses in this part of Yorkshire with mullion windows, the more recent part is Georgian. The gardens have a number of examples of rare bee boles.

A branch of the Sutcliffe family was living at Mayroyd prior to the time of the Reformation. Robert Sutcliffe of Meyrode made his will on 3 January 1530. Five days before he signed his will, he conveyed his estate to Henry Draper, of Broadbottom, and Gilbert Stansfield, chaplain, in trust, to hold the same to the use of Robert Sutcliffe of the Lee and Elizabeth, his wife, for life and for the life of the longer liver. After Robert Sutcliffe’s death there was a dispute as to the will and in 1532 dispositions were taken at Wakefield. The attempt to set it aside failed. Litigation in respect of Mayroyd persisted in Chancery over claims by cousins of Robert Sutcliffe.deceased, the defendant being Robert Sutcliffe of the Lee in Heptonstall.

According to the Historical Notes in the Halifax Guardian, 1882, and the Times & Gazette,1896, “the Sutcliffes of Broadbottom, Fallingroyd and Mayroyd were all descended from the Hoohole branch. These three estates, occupying the lower slopes of the hillside between Hebden Bridge and Mytholmroyd on the sunny side of the valley, form a pleasant picture to the railway traveller as he journeys through the valley of the Calder”. The Notes refer to a time when the settlers in the Calder valley were few and far between, when dark forests stretched down to the Calder edge with here and there a green spot which husbandmen enclosed on which they created rude dwellings. The term “royd” as in Mayroyd is old English meaning “a clearing or place ridded of trees”. Mayroyd, Fallingroyd, Akroyd and Hollingroyd are all names of neighbouring places once part of a forest but cleared and brought into cultivation in pre-Conquest times. In 1588 Robert Sutcliffe of Hoohole came into the possession of the Broadbottom estate by marrying into the family of Draper and in 1596 it is recorded that” William Sutcliffe junior, son and heir of Robert Sutcliffe, clothier, resided at his own residence at Broadbottom”.

There was a case in Chancery in the mid 16th century in which John Sutcliffe, son of Robert Sutcliffe of the Lee in Heptonstall, was plaintiff  against defendants claiming title to Mayroyd and a decree in the plaintiff’s  favour was made “ by the Chancellor of England, Sir Richard Riche, Lord Rich,  that the complainant should have possession and enjoy the said capital messuage, cottages, fulling mill, etc and that the defendants should not vex or annoy upon pain of £200 and should pay the complainant the sum of  40 shillings for his costs”.

The same John Sutcliffe married Margaret Holdsworth of Ashday Hall, Southowram and had two sons, Matthew & Adam, and on 17 January 1553, in the reign of Queen Mary, conveyed the Mayroyd estate in trust to be made over on his death to Matthew Sutcliffe his son & heir, with an annuity of £3 to Margaret his wife for life. He then went to live in Great Grimsby where he died in 1582.

Matthew Sutcliffe was educated at Trinity College, Cambridge, and became a Doctor of Civil Law. He then entered Holy Orders and in 1586 was installed Archdeacon of Taunton. On inheriting the Mayroyd estate on his father’s death in 1582 Dr Sutcliffe, who then resided in Coleman Street in the City of London, sold it to two brothers Adam & Soloman Sutcliffe for £500. Adam afterwards sold it in 1584 for £660 [a goodly profit] to Brian Bentley of Heptonstall and William Cockroft, clothier of Wadsworth. The extent of the property was shown as one messuage, one fulling mill, 3 tofts, 3 gardens, 3 orchards, 20 acres of meadow, 40 acres of pasture, 10 acres of wood, 100 acres of moor, 100 acres of turbary and 40 acres of heath and ling. It remained in the possession of William Cockroft’s descendants, the Halifax Guardian of 1851 records, “until the present time” but in fact even longer than that.

In 1588 Matthew Sutcliffe was confirmed Dean of Exeter and had the idea of building a College of Polemical Divines “ to be employed in opposing the doctrines of Papists and Peligianising Arminians and others who draw towards Popery and Babylonian slavery”. This became a key part of King James I’s plan to encourage a Protestant riposte to the doctrines of the Counter- Reformation emanating from Rome. The charter of incorporation was dated 8 May 1610. Dean Sutcliffe, at his own expense, commenced the erection of one side of the first quadrangle. He died in 1629 and by his will bequeathed the greater part of his estate to the College. Its pair of quadrangles were built by 1618 and sited where the South West wing of the Royal Hospital now stands. The project ultimately failed for want of funds and the buildings were acquired by the Government in 1660 to house Dutch and Scottish prisoners of war. In 1666 the buildings, now dilapidated, were granted by the Crown to the newly created Royal Society of which Christopher Wren was a founding member. In 1682, sponsored by Charles II, Stephen Fox paid £1,300 for the site on which to build Wren’s Royal Hospital for Soldiers.

The will of Dean Matthew Sutcliffe of Hoohoyle, yeoman, dated 20 August 1612, records his wish for his body to be buried in the church or churchyard of Heptonstall. He bequeathed to William Sutcliffe, his son and heir apparent, the half part of Broadebothome in Wadsworth. In 1636 “ William Sutcliffe, the younger of Hooholle, yeoman, married Agnes Sutcliffe, daughter of Henry Sutcliffe, late of Sowerby” and resided at Mayroyd [presumably then under Cockroft ownership] until his death in 1643. In 1659 the Sutcliffes of Broadbottom became connected with the Cockroft family. William Sutcliffe of Broadbottom’s son, William Sutcliffe the younger, married Mary Cockroft of Burstcliffe in Wadsworth and was granted the message called Fallingroyd.

In the winter of 1643, during the Civil War, Mayroyd was a stronghold for the royalists. Death played havoc with the Cockroft family as extracts from the Heptonstall Register of Burials shows:- In November Henry Cockroft of Burlees and Henry Cockroft, sen.of Mayroyd died or were killed. In December William Cockroft’s daughter Maira of Mayroyd; William Cockroft of Burstcliffe, then the widow of Henry of Burlees and William Cockroft of Mayroyd died. In January 1644 Henry Cockroft, jun. of Mayroyd and Henry Cockroft of Saughes and his widow died. The condition of affairs was such that the wills of Henry Cockroft, sen. and jun. were not proved until August 1645 and that of William Cockroft of Mayroyd until August 1647.

William Cockroft of Mayroyd, who died in December 1643, had a son also called William who was baptised at Heptonstall Church in 1638. He married in 1658, at Luddenden Church, Mary, daughter of Henry Murgatroyd, second son of James Murgatroyd of the Hollins, a rich gentleman, who purchased and rebuilt Riddlesden Hall, near Bingley. In 1660, on the restoration of Charles II, William Cockroft of Mayroyd took for a term of 21 years the tithes of corn and hay within the villages and townships of Warley, Midgley, Wadsworth, Heptonstall, and Stansfield, and tithes of wool and lambs within the vicarage of Halifax, at an annual rent of £21 6s.8d, payable to his Majesty. He obtained a further assignment of the same tithes in 1679 for a term of thirty years.

The large chamber at the ancient hostelry called the Stag Inn at Heptonstall was known as ‘the Star Chamber’ and near it stood the stocks. The property was purchased by William Cockroft in 1660 for £162 10s. It is probable that this upper chamber was utilized as a local Court of Justice for the trial of prisoners charged with petty offences and delinguents dubbed the place a Star Chamber where its process was summary and frequently iniquitous and the punishments cruel and arbitrary. William Cockroft died on Royal Oak Day 1685 aged 46 and his widow in 1719 aged 83, recorded in the church by a memorial brass. The estates descended to their son Henry and afterwards to his son Henry and brother William. In 1750 this William Cockroft of Mayroyd and others obtained from Sir George Savile the right to bore and search for coal ‘in the wastes of Wadsworth’. Knowledge of local geology must have been very meagre or money would not have been wasted in such a fruitless undertaking. He died without male issue. A marble slab in Heptonstall church is inscribed as follows ‘Here lies interred William Cockroft of Mayroyd, Esq., who died November 29, 1773, aged 68. Also Mary Cockroft, his wife; she died February 27, 1784, aged 79.’

William Cockcroft left several daughters including Barbara, Ann, Mary and Grace. Ann married William Cockcroft of Burlees who built Stocks Hall, Mytholmroyd; Mary married Thomas Sayer of Halifax, attorney, which accounts for his occupation of Mayroyd; Grace remained unmarried, and Barbara, removed to Halifax. Part of the properties left in his will by their father came into the possession of Grace. A brass plate in Heptonstall church is inscribed “In memory of Grace Cockroft, fifth daughter of William Cockroft, Esq., of Mayroyd, who died the 20th March, 1781 aged 33 years”. In 1788 Mayroyd became the residence of Robert Alcock, gentleman, a commissioner in bankruptcy. On his death for some considerable time, it is believed, Mayroyd was untenanted. According to a notice of Sale by Auction in 1796, Robert Alcock of Mayroyd sold Moss Hall and Daisy Bank Farms, described as “Very Improveable Freehold Estates”.

Subsequent owners and tenants in the 19th century included the Rev. John Crook [1834] who founded Hope Baptist Church in Hebden Bridge in 1858 and John Horsfall [1854] who founded the cloth factory at Calder Mill, John Horsfall & Sons. In 1896 the Times and Gazette reported that “ the Mayroyd estate which recently changed hands has been in the Cockroft family for over 300 years. Previous to that it was in the Sutcliffe family and it is a most interesting fact that the estate should now have reverted back by purchase to the possession of the Sutcliffes”.
