= Joel Barnett =

British politician (1923–2014)

The Right Honourable The Lord Barnett PC
- Barnett's last appearance at House of Lords questions.

Chair of the Public Accounts Committee
- In office July 1979 – 9 June 1983
- Preceded by: Edward du Cann
- Succeeded by: Robert Sheldon

Shadow Chief Secretary to the Treasury
- In office 4 May 1979 – 14 July 1979
- Leader: James Callaghan
- Preceded by: Peter Rees
- In office 22 July 1970 – 5 March 1974
- Leader: Harold Wilson
- Preceded by: Dick Taverne
- Succeeded by: Tom Boardman

Chief Secretary to the Treasury
- In office 5 March 1974 – 4 May 1979
- Prime Minister: Harold Wilson; James Callaghan
- Chancellor: Denis Healey
- Preceded by: Tom Boardman
- Succeeded by: John Biffen

Member of the House of Lords
- Lord Temporal
- Life peerage 30 September 1983 – 1 November 2014

Member of Parliament for Heywood and Royton
- In office 15 October 1964 – 13 May 1983
- Preceded by: Tony Leavey
- Succeeded by: Constituency Abolished

Personal details
- Born: 14 October 1923 Manchester, England
- Died: 1 November 2014 (aged 91) Manchester, England
- Party: Labour

Joel Barnett, Baron Barnett, PC (14 October 1923 – 1 November 2014) was a British Labour Party politician. As Chief Secretary to the Treasury in the late 1970s, he devised the Barnett Formula that allocates public spending in Scotland, Wales and Northern Ireland.

== Life and career ==
Barnett was born in Manchester on 14 October 1923, the son of Jewish tailor Louis and wife Ettie, and was educated at Badkindt Hebrew School and Manchester Central Grammar School. He worked as an accountant. He was elected a councillor on Prestwich Borough Council 1956-1959 and was treasurer of Manchester Fabian Society. Barnett stood in Runcorn in 1959 without success. He was elected member of parliament for Heywood and Royton in 1964. He was a member of the Public Accounts Committee from January 1966.

He served as Chief Secretary to the Treasury from 1974 to 1979, gaining a seat in the cabinet from 1977 onwards, and was Denis Healey's right-hand man in the Callaghan Government. During this time he oversaw the devising of what is known as the Barnett Formula by which public spending is apportioned between England, Scotland, Wales, and Northern Ireland. He subsequently joked about the strange and unexpected form of immortality that was accorded to him by "having his own formula". Following the Scotland Act 1998 and devolution, he argued that the Formula was unfair to England and should be abandoned or revised. He reiterated this view in 2014 shortly before the Scottish independence referendum, calling the Formula unsustainable and saying it had become an embarrassment.

Barnett held the Chairmanship of the Public Accounts Committee from 1979 to 1983. He published a memoir Inside the Treasury in 1982, describing his experience as chief secretary. Barnett's Commons seat having been abolished by boundary changes, he was created a life peer as Baron Barnett, of Heywood and Royton in Greater Manchester on 30 September 1983. He served on select committees in the House of Lords including the European Union Committee, the Economic Affairs Committee and the Monetary Policy Committee of the Bank of England. He was appointed vice-chairman of the Board of Governors of the BBC by Conservative Prime Minister Margaret Thatcher in 1986 and held the post until 1993, during which period he partook in the private meeting when Chairman Marmaduke Hussey told Director-General Alasdair Milne he would have to leave the BBC. He died on 1 November 2014, aged 91.

Parliament of the United Kingdom
Preceded by Tony Leavey	Member of Parliament for Heywood and Royton; 1964–1983	Constituency abolished
Political offices
Preceded by Tom Boardman	Chief Secretary to the Treasury; 1974–1979	Succeeded by John Biffen
