= Blackpool North (constituency) =

Parliamentary constituency in the United Kingdom, 1945–1997

Coordinates: 53.863°N 2.914°W

- Former borough constituency for the House of Commons
- Blackpool North in Lancashire, showing boundaries used from 1974–1983
- County: Lancashire

1945–1997
- Seats: One
- Created from: Blackpool
- Replaced by: Blackpool North and Fleetwood

Blackpool North was a borough constituency in Lancashire which returned one Member of Parliament to the House of Commons of the Parliament of the United Kingdom.

It was created for the 1945 general election, when the former constituency of Blackpool was split in two, and abolished for the 1997 general election. It was then largely replaced by the new Blackpool North & Fleetwood constituency.

== Boundaries ==
1945–1950: The County Borough of Blackpool wards of Alexandra, Bank Hey, Bispham, Brunswick, Claremont, Foxhall, Layton, Talbot, Tyldesley, and Warbreck.

1950–1983: The County Borough of Blackpool wards of Bank Hey, Bispham, Brunswick, Claremont, Foxhall, Layton, Talbot, and Warbreck.

1983–1997: The Borough of Blackpool wards of Anchorsholme, Bispham, Brunswick, Claremont, Greenlands, Ingthorpe, Layton, Norbreck, Park, Talbot, and Warbreck.

== Members of Parliament ==
Election	Member	Party
1945	Sir Toby Low	Conservative
1962 by-election	Norman Miscampbell	Conservative
1992	Harold Elletson	Conservative
1997	constituency abolished	

== Elections ==
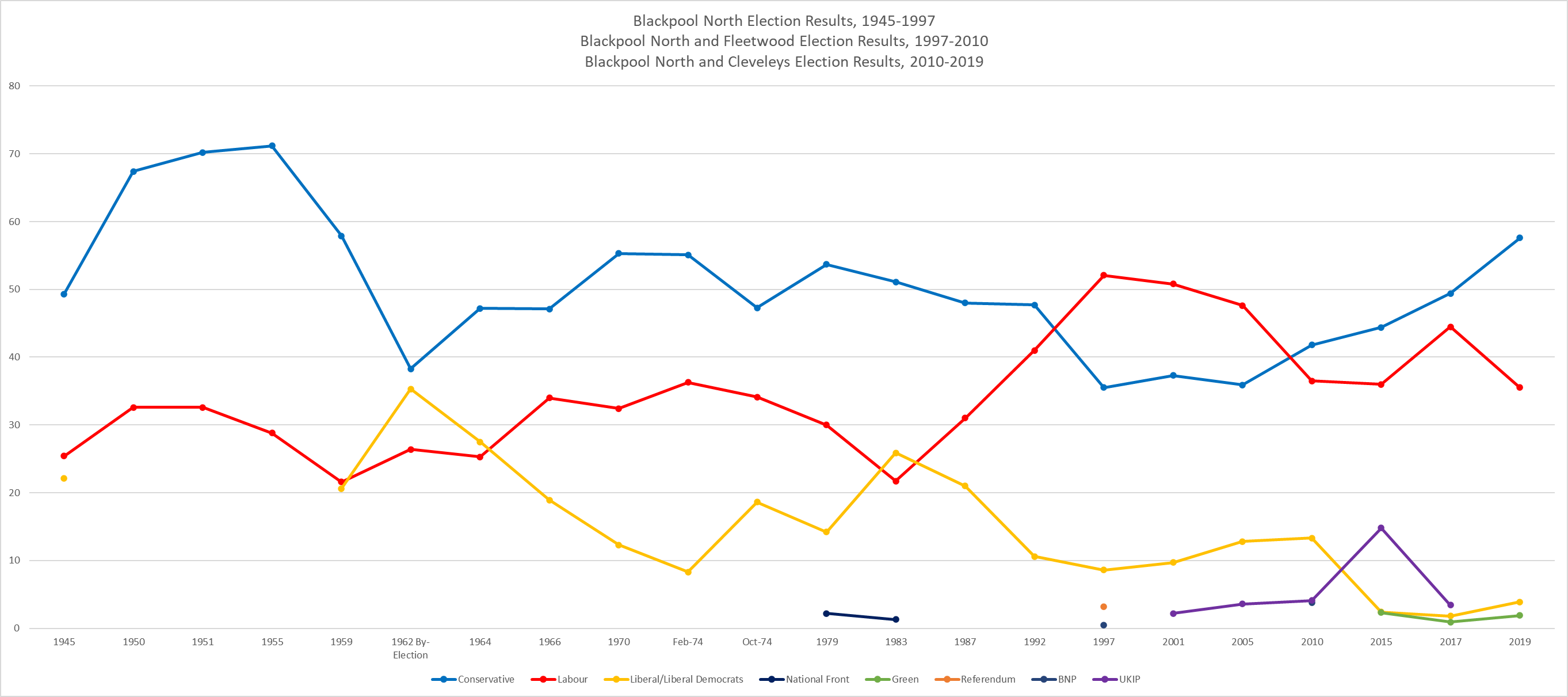
Blackpool North Election Results

=== Elections in the 1940s ===
General election 1945: Blackpool North
Party	Candidate	Votes	%	±%
Conservative	Toby Low	25,564	49.3	
Labour	Cadwalader Edward Thomas	13,170	25.4	
Liberal	Kenneth Innes Hamilton	11,452	22.1	
National Independent	Arthur Talbot	1,635	3.2	
Majority		12,394	23.9	
Turnout		51,821	68.0	
Conservative win (new seat)				

=== Elections in the 1950s ===
General election 1950: Blackpool North
Party	Candidate	Votes	%	±%
Conservative	Toby Low	31,655	67.4	+18.1
Labour	E.B. Muir	15,308	32.6	+7.2
Majority		16,347	34.8	+10.9
Turnout		46,963	79.4	+11.4
Conservative hold		Swing	+5.5	

General election 1951: Blackpool North
Party	Candidate	Votes	%	±%
Conservative	Toby Low	29,956	70.2	+2.8
Labour	Samuel Victor Hyde-Price	12,727	29.8	−2.8
Majority		17,229	40.4	+5.6
Turnout		42,683	73.3	−6.1
Conservative hold		Swing	+2.8	

General election 1955: Blackpool North
Party	Candidate	Votes	%	±%
Conservative	Toby Low	26,899	71.2	+1.0
Labour	Ronald Bushby	10,869	28.8	−1.0
Majority		16,030	42.4	+2.0
Turnout		37,768	66.9	−6.4
Conservative hold		Swing	+1.0	

General election 1959: Blackpool North
Party	Candidate	Votes	%	±%
Conservative	Toby Low	25,297	57.9	−13.3
Labour	William H Dugdale	9,440	21.6	−7.2
Liberal	Harry Hague	8,990	20.6	New
Majority		15,857	36.3	−6.1
Turnout		43,727	76.6	+9.7
Conservative hold		Swing	−3.1	

=== Elections in the 1960s ===
1962 Blackpool North by-election
Party	Candidate	Votes	%	±%
Conservative	Norman Miscampbell	12,711	38.3	−19.6
Liberal	Harry Hague	11,738	35.3	+14.7
Labour	Shirley Summerskill	8,776	26.4	+4.8
Majority		973	3.0	−33.3
Turnout		33,225		
Conservative hold		Swing		

General election 1964: Blackpool North
Party	Candidate	Votes	%	±%
Conservative	Norman Miscampbell	19,633	47.2	−10.7
Liberal	Harry Hague	11,462	27.5	+6.9
Labour	Thomas McKellar	10,543	25.3	+3.7
Majority		8,171	19.7	−16.6
Turnout		41,638	74.7	−1.9
Conservative hold		Swing		

General election 1966: Blackpool North
Party	Candidate	Votes	%	±%
Conservative	Norman Miscampbell	19,173	47.1	−0.1
Labour	George E Bingham	13,863	34.0	+8.7
Liberal	James Henry Hessey	7,699	18.9	−8.6
Majority		5,310	13.1	−6.6
Turnout		40,735	72.9	−1.8
Conservative hold		Swing		

=== Elections in the 1970s ===
General election 1970: Blackpool North
Party	Candidate	Votes	%	±%
Conservative	Norman Miscampbell	22,298	55.3	+8.2
Labour	Wilfred Callon	13,062	32.4	−1.6
Liberal	Bernard Miles Christon	4,946	12.3	−6.6
Majority		9,236	22.9	+9.8
Turnout		40,306	68.4	−4.5
Conservative hold		Swing	+4.9	

General election February 1974: Blackpool North
Party	Candidate	Votes	%	±%
Conservative	Norman Miscampbell	23,942	55.1	−0.2
Labour	Ivan John Taylor	15,788	36.3	+3.9
Independent Liberal	Peter Bisbrown Nickson	3,720	8.6	New
Majority		8,154	18.8	−4.1
Turnout		43,450	73.3	+4.9
Conservative hold		Swing	−2.1	

General election October 1974: Blackpool North
Party	Candidate	Votes	%	±%
Conservative	Norman Miscampbell	19,662	47.3	−7.8
Labour	Ivan John Taylor	14,195	34.1	−2.3
Liberal	Gerard Anthony Mulholland	7,750	18.6	New
Majority		5,467	13.2	−5.6
Turnout		41,607	69.6	−3.7
Conservative hold		Swing	−2.8	

General election 1979: Blackpool North
Party	Candidate	Votes	%	±%
Conservative	Norman Miscampbell	23,209	53.7	+6.4
Labour	Andrew W. Verdeille	12,980	30.0	−4.1
Liberal	Christopher James Heyworth	6,127	14.2	−4.4
National Front	Alvin Stanley Hanson	943	2.2	New
Majority		10,229	23.7	+10.5
Turnout		43,259	72.6	+3.0
Conservative hold		Swing	+5.3	

=== Elections in the 1980s ===
General election 1983: Blackpool North
Party	Candidate	Votes	%	±%
Conservative	Norman Miscampbell	20,592	51.1	−2.6
Liberal	Christopher Heyworth	10,440	25.9	+11.7
Labour	Michael Hindley	8,730	21.7	−8.3
National Front	Alvin Hanson	514	1.3	−0.9
Majority		10,152	25.2	+1.5
Turnout		40,276	70.0	−2.6
Conservative hold		Swing		

General election 1987: Blackpool North
Party	Candidate	Votes	%	±%
Conservative	Norman Miscampbell	20,680	48.0	−3.1
Labour	Eric Kirton	13,359	31.0	+9.3
Liberal	Christopher Heyworth	9,032	21.0	−4.9
Majority		7,321	17.0	−8.2
Turnout		43,071	73.1	+3.1
Conservative hold		Swing		

=== Elections in the 1990s ===
General election 1992: Blackpool North
Party	Candidate	Votes	%	±%
Conservative	Harold Elletson	21,501	47.7	−0.3
Labour	Eric Kirton	18,461	41.0	+10.0
Liberal Democrats	Andre Lahiff	4,786	10.6	−10.4
Monster Raving Loony	Guy Francis	178	0.4	New
Natural Law	Hugh Walker	125	0.3	New
Majority		3,040	6.7	−10.3
Turnout		45,051	77.5	+4.4
Conservative hold		Swing	−5.1	

== See also ==
- List of parliamentary constituencies in Lancashire
- The town of Blackpool

== Sources ==
- F. W. S. Craig, British Parliamentary Election Results 1950–73
