= William Gorman (politician) =

British politician and judge

Sir William Gorman (15 October 1891 – 21 December 1964) was an English barrister, judge and Liberal Party politician.

== Family and education ==
Gorman was born in Wigan in Lancashire, the son of William Gorman, a shopkeeper in Wigan, and Catherine Jump. He was the grandson of Henry Gorman, also a Wigan shopkeeper, who was born in Tipperary, Ireland in 1825. He was educated at Wigan Grammar School. He never married.

== Career ==
Gorman went in for the law and was called to the Bar at the Middle Temple in 1921. He took silk in 1932. He practised on the Northern Circuit and was elected a Bencher of the Middle Temple in 1938, acting as its treasurer in 1959. He was made a judge in 1934, serving as Recorder of Wigan from 1934 to 1948 and was Recorder of Liverpool from 1948 to 1950. In 1950 he was appointed a Judge of the High Court of Justice, King's Bench Division. As Mr Justice Gorman, he was the judge who presided over the infamous A6 Murder trial, the longest murder trial in modern times, at which James Hanratty was convicted. Hanratty was later hanged for the murder.

During the Second World War, Gorman served in the Royal Artillery, 7th Division, in France, Belgium and Italy. He also served in the Royal Air Force Volunteer Reserve from 1940 to 1944, leaving with the rank of wing commander. From 1942 to 1944 he held the position of Assistant Judge Advocate General.

== Politics ==
=== 1922 ===
Gorman first tried to enter the House of Commons at the 1922 general election when he fought Royton as a Liberal. In a three-cornered contest he was 1,093 votes behind the sitting Conservative MP, Sir Wilfrid Sugden. The Labour candidate Mr J Battle came third with just under 20% of the poll, giving Gorman hope that in a straight fight he might win the seat at a future attempt.

=== 1923 ===
In 1923 Gorman again fought Royton and there was again a three-cornered contest. This time however the effects of Liberal reunion between the Lloyd George and Asquithian wings of the Liberal Party gave him a valuable boost and he overtook Sugden to capture the seat with a majority of 2,516 votes. Labour again came bottom of the poll, their candidate the Rev. J B Turner, losing his deposit.

=== 1924 ===
Labour refused to concede Gorman a straight fight against the Tories in 1924 either. Their candidate, Mr A E Wood, duly came bottom of the poll again but raised his party's share of the vote to 19%. With the anti-Tory vote thus split again and the Conservatives resurgent in the country after the brief period of the first Labour government, their new candidate Arthur Davies, defeated Gorman by a majority 2,426. Gorman did not stand for Parliament again.

Gorman retained his association with Liberal politics however and was elected President of the Oldham Reform Club in 1925.

== Honours ==
Gorman was knighted in 1950. He served as President of Caterham School in Surrey from 1953. He was made an Honorary Freeman of Wigan in 1954 and received the Honorary degree of Doctor of Laws from the University of Manchester in 1957.

== Other appointments ==
In 1944, Gorman was appointed by Ernest Bevin, the Minister of Labour and National Service, to sit on the National Arbitration Tribunal, a body established to resolve labour disputes under wartime restrictions on strikes and lockouts. He also served on the Industrial and Staff Canteen Undertakings Wages Board, set to consider wage claims under the Catering Wages Act 1943.

== Death ==
Gorman died in the West London Hospital on 21 December 1964 aged 73 years. A memorial service was held for him in the Temple Church on 11 February 1965 attended by senior members of the judiciary and the legal profession.

Parliament of the United Kingdom
Preceded by Wilfrid Sugden	Member of Parliament for Royton; 1923 – 1924	Succeeded by Arthur Vernon Davies
