= Blackburn East =

Parliamentary constituency in the United Kingdom, 1950–1955

- Former borough constituency for the House of Commons

1950–1955
- Seats: one
- Created from: Blackburn
- Replaced by: Blackburn

Blackburn East was a parliamentary constituency in the town of Blackburn in Lancashire. It returned one Member of Parliament (MP) to the House of Commons of the Parliament of the United Kingdom, elected by the first past the post system.

The constituency was created for the 1950 general election, when the former two-member Blackburn constituency was divided into Blackburn East and Blackburn West. It was abolished only five years later, for the 1955 general election, when it was partly replaced by a new single-member Blackburn constituency.

== Boundaries ==
1950–1955: The County Borough of Blackburn wards of St John's, St Mary's, St Matthew's, St Michael's, St Stephen's, St Thomas's, and Trinity.

== Members of Parliament ==
Election	Member	Party
1950	Barbara Castle	Labour
1955	constituency abolished: see Blackburn	

== Elections ==
=== Elections in the 1950s ===
General election 1950: Blackburn East
Party	Candidate	Votes	%	±%
Labour	Barbara Castle	19,480	52.8	
Conservative	Tony Leavey	14,662	39.8	
Liberal	Harry Hague	2,743	7.4	
Majority		4,818	13.0	
Turnout		36,885	89.1	
Labour win (new seat)				

General election 1951: Blackburn East
Party	Candidate	Votes	%	±%
Labour	Barbara Castle	19,661	53.6	+0.8
Conservative	Tony Leavey	17,029	46.4	+6.6
Majority		2,632	7.2	−5.8
Turnout		36,690	88.9	−0.2
Labour hold		Swing	-2.9	
