= Heywood and Royton =

Parliamentary constituency in the United Kingdom, 1950–1983

- Former borough constituency for the House of Commons

1950–1983
- Seats: one
- Created from: Heywood and Radcliffe and Royton
- Replaced by: Littleborough and Saddleworth, Heywood & Middleton, Oldham Central and Royton, Rossendale and Darwen and Rochdale

Heywood and Royton was a parliamentary constituency centred on the Heywood and Royton districts in the north-west of Greater Manchester. It returned one Member of Parliament (MP) to the House of Commons of the Parliament of the United Kingdom.

The constituency was created for the 1950 general election, and abolished for the 1983 general election, when its territory was largely divided between the new constituencies of Heywood & Middleton and Oldham Central and Royton.

== Boundaries ==
Heywood and Royton in Lancashire, boundaries used 1974–83

The Borough of Heywood, and the Urban Districts of Crompton, Littleborough, Milnrow, Royton, Wardle, and Whitworth.

== Members of Parliament ==
Election	Member	Party
1950	Sir Harold Sutcliffe	Conservative
1955	Tony Leavey	Conservative
1964	Joel Barnett	Labour
1983	constituency abolished: see Heywood and Middleton & Oldham Central and Royton	

== Elections ==
=== Elections in the 1950s ===
General election 1950: Heywood and Royton
Party	Candidate	Votes	%	±%
Conservative	Harold Sutcliffe	23,518	44.04	
Labour	Charles J Hurley	21,482	40.23	
Liberal	William Hibbert Watkinson	8,404	15.74	
Majority		2,036	3.81	
Turnout		53,404	87.98	
Conservative win (new seat)				

General election 1951: Heywood and Royton
Party	Candidate	Votes	%	±%
Conservative	Harold Sutcliffe	28,086	53.84	
Labour	Charles J Hurley	24,083	46.16	
Majority		4,003	7.67	
Turnout		52,169	85.08	
Conservative hold		Swing		

General election 1955: Heywood and Royton
Party	Candidate	Votes	%	±%
Conservative	Tony Leavey	25,824	53.31	
Labour	Alan Lever Tillotson	22,614	46.69	
Majority		3,210	6.63	
Turnout		48,438	81.82	
Conservative hold		Swing		

General election 1959: Heywood and Royton
Party	Candidate	Votes	%	±%
Conservative	Tony Leavey	19,742	40.25	
Labour	Harry Nevin	17,588	35.86	
Liberal	Geoffrey Eugene MacPherson	11,713	23.88	N/A
Majority		2,154	4.39	
Turnout		49,043	84.75	
Conservative hold		Swing		

=== Elections in the 1960s ===
General election 1964: Heywood and Royton
Party	Candidate	Votes	%	±%
Labour	Joel Barnett	20,174	40.80	
Conservative	Tony Leavey	19,358	39.15	
Liberal	Wilfred Eric Critchley	9,914	20.05	
Majority		816	1.65	N/A
Turnout		49,446	82.78	
Labour gain from Conservative		Swing		

General election 1966: Heywood and Royton
Party	Candidate	Votes	%	±%
Labour	Joel Barnett	24,701	48.93	
Conservative	David Waddington	19,048	37.73	
Liberal	James Clarney	6,732	13.34	
Majority		5,653	11.20	
Turnout		50,481	79.58	
Labour hold		Swing		

=== Elections in the 1970s ===
General election 1970: Heywood and Royton
Party	Candidate	Votes	%	±%
Labour	Joel Barnett	25,081	45.70	
Conservative	Ian MacGregor	24,178	44.06	
Liberal	Francis Joseph Beetham	5,620	10.24	
Majority		903	1.65	
Turnout		54,879	76.13	
Labour hold		Swing		

General election February 1974: Heywood and Royton
Party	Candidate	Votes	%	±%
Labour	Joel Barnett	28,216	44.32	
Conservative	Ian MacGregor	21,054	33.07	
Liberal	Viv Bingham	14,392	22.61	
Majority		7,162	11.25	
Turnout		63,662	82.62	
Labour hold		Swing		

General election October 1974: Heywood and Royton
Party	Candidate	Votes	%	±%
Labour	Joel Barnett	27,206	45.74	
Conservative	Peter Morgan	19,307	32.46	
Liberal	Viv Bingham	12,969	21.80	
Majority		7,899	13.28	
Turnout		59,482	76.55	
Labour hold		Swing		

General election 1979: Heywood and Royton
Party	Candidate	Votes	%	±%
Labour	Joel Barnett	28,489	45.24	
Conservative	Peter Morgan	26,202	41.61	
Liberal	M Hewitt	7,644	12.14	
National Front	R Marsh	641	1.02	N/A
Majority		2,287	3.63	
Turnout		62,976	76.61	
Labour hold		Swing		
