= Royton (constituency) =

Parliamentary constituency in the United Kingdom, 1918–1950

- Former county constituency for the House of Commons

1918–1950
- Seats: One
- Created from: Middleton
- Replaced by: Heywood and Royton

Royton was, from 1918 to 1950, a parliamentary constituency of the United Kingdom, centred on Royton in North West England. It returned one Member of Parliament (MP) to the House of Commons of the Parliament of the United Kingdom, elected by the first past the post system.

== History ==
The constituency was created for the 1918 general election, and abolished for the 1950 general election.

== Boundaries ==
The Urban Districts of Crompton, Littleborough, Milnrow, Norden, Royton, Wardle, and Whitworth.

== Members of Parliament ==
| Election | Member | Party |
|---|---|---|
| 1918 | Sir Wilfrid Sugden | Coalition Conservative |
| 1923 | William Gorman | Liberal |
| 1924 | Arthur Vernon Davies | Conservative |
| 1931 | Harold Sutcliffe | Conservative |
| 1950 | constituency abolished | |

== Election results ==
=== Elections in the 1910s ===
General election 1918: Royton
| Party | | Candidate | Votes | % | ±% |
|---|---|---|---|---|---|
| C | Unionist | Wilfrid Hart Sugden | 12,434 | 57.1 | |
| | Labour | James Crinion | 4,875 | 22.4 | |
| | Liberal | Hugh Fullerton | 4,451 | 20.5 | |
| Majority | | | 7,559 | 34.7 | |
| Turnout | | | 21,760 | 61.7 | |
| Registered electors | | | 35,239 | | |
| | Unionist win (new seat) | | | | |
C indicates candidate endorsed by the coalition government.

=== Elections in the 1920s ===
General election 1922: Royton
| Party | Candidate | Votes | % | ±% |
|---|---|---|---|---|
| Unionist | Sir Wilfrid Hart Sugden | 12,388 | 42.1 | −15.0 |
| Liberal | William Gorman | 11,295 | 38.3 | +17.8 |
| Labour | John B Battle | 5,776 | 19.6 | −2.8 |
| Majority | | 1,093 | 3.8 | −30.9 |
| Turnout | | 29,459 | 83.4 | +22.7 |
| Registered electors | | 35,318 | | |
| Unionist hold | | Swing | −16.4 | |

General election 1923: Royton
| Party | Candidate | Votes | % | ±% |
|---|---|---|---|---|
| Liberal | William Gorman | 14,836 | 49.6 | +11.3 |
| Unionist | Sir Wilfrid Hart Sugden | 12,320 | 41.2 | −0.9 |
| Labour | Rev. James Barton Turner | 2,740 | 9.2 | −10.4 |
| Majority | | 2,516 | 8.4 | N/A |
| Turnout | | 29,896 | 82.9 | −0.5 |
| Registered electors | | 36,041 | | |
| Liberal gain from Unionist | | Swing | +6.1 | |

General election 1924: Royton
| Party | Candidate | Votes | % | ±% |
|---|---|---|---|---|
| Unionist | Arthur Vernon Davies | 13,859 | 44.1 | +2.8 |
| Liberal | William Gorman | 11,433 | 36.4 | −13.2 |
| Labour | Albert E. Wood | 6,156 | 19.6 | +10.4 |
| Majority | | 2,426 | 7.7 | N/A |
| Turnout | | 31,448 | 86.3 | +3.4 |
| Registered electors | | 36,449 | | |
| Unionist gain from Liberal | | Swing | +8.0 | |

General election 1929: Royton
| Party | Candidate | Votes | % | ±% |
|---|---|---|---|---|
| Unionist | Arthur Vernon Davies | 15,051 | 38.4 | −5.6 |
| Liberal | Harold Derbyshire | 13,347 | 34.1 | −2.3 |
| Labour | Albert E. Wood | 10,763 | 27.5 | +7.9 |
| Majority | | 1,704 | 4.3 | −3.3 |
| Turnout | | 39,161 | 82.9 | −3.4 |
| Registered electors | | 47,266 | | |
| Unionist hold | | Swing | −1.7 | |

=== Elections in the 1930s ===
General election 1931: Royton
| Party | Candidate | Votes | % | ±% |
|---|---|---|---|---|
| Conservative | Harold Sutcliffe | 21,044 | 51.2 | +12.8 |
| Liberal | Ronald Fitz-John Walker | 14,142 | 34.4 | +0.3 |
| Labour | G Illingworth | 5,913 | 14.4 | −13.1 |
| Majority | | 6,902 | 16.8 | +12.5 |
| Turnout | | 41,099 | 85.9 | |
| Conservative hold | | Swing | +6.2 | |

General election 1935: Royton
| Party | Candidate | Votes | % | ±% |
|---|---|---|---|---|
| Conservative | Harold Sutcliffe | 20,510 | 52.2 | +1.0 |
| Liberal | Ronald Fitz-John Walker | 9,910 | 25.2 | −9.2 |
| Labour | Leonard Oakes | 8,845 | 22.5 | +8.2 |
| Majority | | 10,600 | 27.0 | +10.2 |
| Turnout | | 39,264 | 81.7 | −4.2 |
| Conservative hold | | Swing | +5.1 | |

=== Elections in the 1940s ===
General Election 1939–40: Another General Election was required to take place before the end of 1940. The political parties had been making preparations for an election to take place from 1939 and by the end of this year, the following candidates had been selected;

- Conservative: Harold Sutcliffe
- Liberal: Mayne Knight

General election 1945: Royton
| Party | Candidate | Votes | % | ±% |
|---|---|---|---|---|
| Conservative | Harold Sutcliffe | 15,388 | 41.9 | −10.3 |
| Labour | Hervey Rhodes | 13,753 | 37.4 | +14.9 |
| Liberal | A Mayne Knight | 7,618 | 20.7 | −4.5 |
| Majority | | 1,635 | 4.5 | −25.2 |
| Turnout | | 36,759 | 81.1 | −0.6 |
| Conservative hold | | Swing | -12.6 | |
