= Matthew Sutcliffe =

English clergyman, academic and lawyer

- Born: c. 1550
- Died: 1629
- Known for: Dean of Exeter
- Parent(s): John Sutcliffe; Margaret Owlsworth

Matthew Sutcliffe (c. 1550 – 1629) was an English clergyman, academic and lawyer. He became Dean of Exeter, and wrote extensively on religious matters as a controversialist. He served as chaplain to King James I of England. He was the founder of Chelsea College, a royal centre for the writing of theological literature that was closed at the behest of Charles I. He also played a part in the early settlement of New England as an investor.

== Life ==
Born about 1550, he was the second son of John Sutcliffe of Mayroyd in the parish of Halifax, Yorkshire, by his wife, Margaret Owlsworth of Ashley in the same county. Admitted to Peterhouse, Cambridge in 1565, he was admitted a scholar of Trinity College, Cambridge on 30 April 1568, proceeded B.A. in 1571, and was elected a minor fellow of his college on 27 September 1572. He commenced M.A. in 1574, and became a major fellow on 3 April in that year. In 1579 he was appointed lector mathematicus in the college, and in the next year, at Midsummer, the payment of his last stipend as fellow of Trinity is recorded. He graduated LL.D. in 1581.

On 1 May 1582 he was admitted a member of the college of advocates at Doctors' Commons; and on 30 January 1587 he was installed archdeacon of Taunton. On 27 October 1588 he became Dean of Exeter, a position he held for more than forty years. As he was also vicar of West Alvington, Devon, the Archbishop of Canterbury granted him letters of dispensation allowing him to hold that vicarage. He was instituted to Harberton vicarage on 9 November 1590, and to the rectory of Lezant on 6 April 1594. as well as to Newton Ferrers on 27 December 1591.

== Chelsea College ==
The major event of Sutcliffe's life was his foundation of a college at Chelsea, to which he was a generous benefactor. Sutcliffe, an Anglican, adhered to a Reformed Protestant theology, and hoped to advance Reformation within the Anglican church. Chelsea backed theologians engaged principally in religious studies and polemical studies against Arminianism and Roman Catholicism. The project was denied long-term success, however; the College nominally survived until the 1650s, but the initial momentum was not sustained under Charles I, who gave the College the cold shoulder where his father had been a generous patron.

== American affairs ==
Sutcliffe was early interested in the settlement of New England, and John Smith of Jamestown mentions, in his Generall Historie (1624), that the dean assisted and encouraged him in his schemes. On 9 March 1607 he became a member of the council for Virginia, and on 3 November 1620 of that for New England. In July 1624 he was one of the commissioners appointed to wind up the affairs of the Virginia Company. Erstwhile Sutcliffe invested in the Plymouth Adventurer's Colony and a failed attempt at settlement in Sagadahoc in present-day Maine. He also shared an interest in a ship, the Great Neptune, with his fellow Council for New England member, Barnabe Gooch. ODNB. Sutcliffe's name is mentioned in the 1620 Charter of New England Confederation.

== Early strategist ==
Sutcliffe spent time, possibly as chaplain, with the forces of the Earl of Essex on campaign. In 1593 he published The Practice, Proceedings, and Lawes of Armes, arguably the first comprehensive strategic concept in history, ranging from how to recruit forces and raise taxes for war to the actual strategy of preventive war against Spain. Three years later, Earl of Essex acted on this advice and launched an attack against Spain, resulting in the capture of Cádiz in 1596.

== Fall from favour ==
For a long time Sutcliffe was in high favour at court. He had been appointed one of the royal chaplains in the reign of Elizabeth, and is stated to have retained the office under James I. He fell into disfavour in consequence of his opposition to the Spanish match, at the same time as Henry de Vere, 18th Earl of Oxford, and was later vindicated and continued to receive appointments of the highest order until his death.

Sutcliffe died in 1629, before 18 July.

== Works ==
Sutcliffe wrote over 20 works, many of them published as 'O. E.' They cover a range of religious issues from the 1590s to 1620s: on the Anglican front concerned with John Udall, Job Throckmorton, Thomas Cartwright, and a defence of the government version of the treason of Edward Squire; and anti-Catholic replies to Cardinal Bellarmine, Robert Parsons, Henry Garnet, George Blackwell, Matthew Kellison and Tobie Mathew.

Nicholas Bernard presented to Emmanuel College, Cambridge Sutcliffe's manuscript works in fourteen volumes.

Sutcliffe's style of rhetoric against Catholicism, along with that of Sir Francis Hastings and Thomas Morton, is judged to depend ultimately on scaremongering about Catholic priests and laypeople. He was more thematic than Hastings, and supplied better arguments based on a "true" and "false" Catholic Church, but still fell back on ad hominem invective. Nicholas W. S. Cranfield, writing in the Oxford Dictionary of National Biography, notes that Sutcliffe denounced papists as worse than Turks, that he took a harder line than James I against the proposition that the Church of Rome had only recently defaulted in its role as mother church, and that his works "rarely progress beyond xenophobia and violent anti-Catholicism" and "display a neurotic fear of the power of Rome to subvert". Apologists for Sutcliffe, however, point out that his polemics against Romanism was in the spirit of the times, and herald Sutcliffe as an unsung theological worthy among Protestants on par with John Knox.

Sutcliffe is also notable for the earliest known use of the verb "to assassinate" in printed English. This was in A Briefe Replie to a Certaine Odious and Slanderous Libel, Lately Published by a Seditious Jesuite, a pamphlet printed in 1600, five years before the word was used in this way in Macbeth by William Shakespeare (1605).
