= 1962 Blackpool North by-election =

UK Parliamentary by-election

The 1962 by-election for the British House of Commons constituency of Blackpool North, in Blackpool, Lancashire, England, was held on 13 March 1962. The by-election was called following the elevation to the peerage of the incumbent Toby Low, 1st Baron Aldington.

This was the last parliamentary by-election in England to be held on a day other than Thursday.

The result was a hold for the Conservative Party.

Blackpool North by-election, 1962
Party	Candidate	Votes	%	±%
Conservative	Norman Miscampbell	12,711	38.3	−19.6
Liberal	Harry Hague	11,738	35.3	+14.7
Labour	Shirley Summerskill	8,776	26.4	+4.8
Majority		973	3.0	−33.4
Turnout		33,225		
Conservative hold		Swing		

== See also ==
- Blackpool North (UK Parliament constituency)
- List of United Kingdom by-elections
