= Arthur Vernon Davies =

British politician and surgeon

Arthur Vernon Davies OBE (1872 – 4 August 1942) was a British surgeon and politician, who served as the Conservative member of parliament for Royton between 1924 and 1931.

Born at Bridgend, Davies was educated in Cardiff and studied at Owens College, Manchester. He joined a medical practice in Shaw in 1898, aged 22, and took over the practice the following year. He later became the certifying factory surgeon for the district, as well as the police surgeon, and in 1919 was appointed as the medical officer of health for Crompton Urban District. He retired from practice in 1922, aged 50, and moved to Woking. He had been closely involved with the St. John's Ambulance, and for his work he was made a Knight of the Order of Saint John, as well as awarded an OBE.

In May 1924, he was selected as the Conservative candidate for Royton, and at the 1924 general election he defeated the incumbent Liberal MP, William Gorman. He held the seat, with a reduced majority, in 1929. However, in October 1931, the local Conservative Association selected another candidate for the upcoming general election; Davies had been taken seriously ill in late 1930, and it was believed that as he had not fully recovered, he would not be able to stand up to the election campaign. He accordingly retired from Parliament in 1931.
