= Toby Low, 1st Baron Aldington =

British politician and businessman

Brigadier The Right Honourable The Lord Aldington KCMG CBE DSO TD PC DL
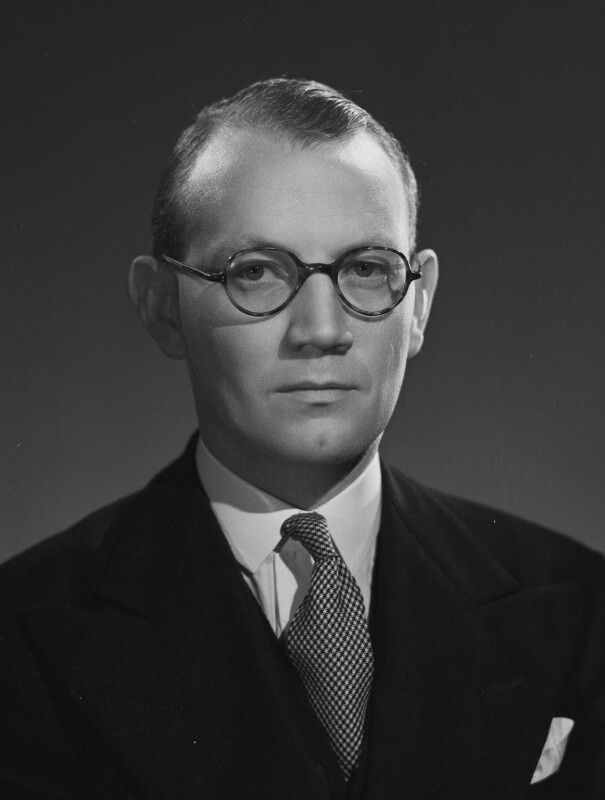
- Low in 1946

Member of the House of Lords
- Lord Temporal
- Hereditary peerage 29 January 1962 – 11 November 1999
- Preceded by: Peerage created
- Succeeded by: Seat abolished
- Life peerage 16 November 1999 – 7 December 2000

Member of Parliament for Blackpool North
- In office 5 July 1945 – 29 January 1962
- Preceded by: New constituency
- Succeeded by: Norman Miscampbell

Personal details
- Born: Austin Richard William Low; 25 May 1914 London, United Kingdom
- Died: 7 December 2000 (aged 86) United Kingdom
- Party: Conservative
- Relations: James Atkin, Baron Atkin (grandfather)
- Children: Charles Low, 2nd Baron Aldington
- Education: New College, Oxford
- Occupation: Businessman, politician, and Army officer
- Civilian awards: Knight Commander of the Order of St Michael and St George

Military service
- Allegiance: United Kingdom
- Branch/service: British Army
- Rank: Brigadier
- Unit: King's Royal Rifle Corps
- Battles/wars: Second World War: Battle of Greece; Battle of Crete; Western Desert campaign; Tunisian campaign; Italian campaign
- Military awards: Commander of the Order of the British Empire; Companion of the Distinguished Service Order; Territorial Decoration

Brigadier Toby Austin Richard William Low, 1st Baron Aldington, Baron Low, KCMG, CBE, DSO, TD, PC, DL (25 May 1914 – 7 December 2000), known as Austin Richard William Low until he added "Toby" as a forename by deed poll on 10 July 1957, was a British Conservative Party politician and businessman. He was however best known for his role in the forced handover of Cossack collaborators and the Bleiburg repatriations. After he was accused of war crimes in the late 1980s, he successfully sued his accusers for libel.

== Life ==
He was the son of Colonel Stuart Low, the Chairman of Grindlays Bank, who was killed in the sinking of MV Henry Stanley in 1942, and Lucy Atkin, daughter of the Lord Atkin. He was educated at Winchester College (where he later became Warden, i.e. chairman of the governing body), and at New College, Oxford where he studied law. He qualified as a barrister in 1939.

He joined the Rangers (King's Royal Rifle Corps), a famous London Territorial Infantry Regiment, in 1934 and served in World War II in Greece, Crete, Egypt, Libya, Tunisia, Italy and Austria, becoming the youngest brigadier in the British Army in 1944, when he became Brigadier General Staff (BGS) of V Corps, commanded first by Lieutenant-General Charles Allfrey and then by Lieutenant-General Charles Keightley. He was appointed a Companion of the Distinguished Service Order in 1941, made a Commander of the Legion of Merit (US) and awarded the Croix de Guerre.

Low stood for Parliament as a Conservative in the 1945 general election, and won the seat of Blackpool North. He served as Parliamentary Secretary at the Ministry of Supply 1951–54 and Minister of State at the Board of Trade from 1954, becoming a Privy Counsellor.

In 1957, he was knighted and became chair of the Select committee on nationalised industry. In 1959, he became deputy Conservative Party chairman. In 1962 he was created Baron Aldington, of Bispham in the County Borough of Blackpool, and increased his business interests, serving as the chairman of several companies. He had been a director of the Grindlay family banking company, Grindlays Bank, in 1946, following his father and grandfather.

In 1964, Lord Aldington became chairman of the bank as well as of GEC. In 1971, he joined the BBC general advisory council, and became chairman of Sun-Alliance and the Port of London Authority. In 1972, he became co-chairman, with Jack Jones, of the joint special committee on the ports industry. He became chairman of Westland in 1977.

Lord Aldington was considered a One Nation Conservative and supported British involvement in the European Union. He continued political activities in the House of Lords, including as chairman of the Lords' select committee on overseas trade. He was also a Deputy Lieutenant for Kent.

In 1999, when hereditary peers were excluded from the House of Lords by the House of Lords Act 1999, as a hereditary peer of first creation he was granted a life peerage as Baron Low, of Bispham in the County of Lancashire, so that he could remain.

== Family ==
Aldington married Felicité Ann Araminta MacMichael (died 2012), a daughter of Sir Harold MacMichael, on 10 April 1947. They had a son, Charles Low, 2nd Baron Aldington, and two daughters, Jane, Lady Roberts (Curator of the Print Room at Windsor Castle and Royal Librarian; married Sir Hugh Roberts), and Lucy Ann Anthea (married Alasdair Laing).

Lady Aldington was Patron of the Jacob Sheep Society.

== Libel case ==
In 1989 Lord Aldington initiated and won a record £1.5 million (plus £500,000 costs) in a libel case against Nikolai Tolstoy and Nigel Watts, who had accused him of war crimes in Austria. The accusation stemmed from his involvement in the forced handover of Cossacks at Lienz, part of the mandatory repatriation of Soviet citizens at the end of the Second World War. Tolstoy had written several books (Victims of Yalta in 1977, Stalin's Secret War in 1981, The Minister and the Massacres in 1986) about the alleged complicity of British politicians and officers with Soviet forces in the persecution of White Russian exiles from Soviet rule, Cossack collaborators, Croatian paramilitaries and collaborationist fugitives from Tito, as well as 11,000 Slovenian anti-communist fighters.

Nigel Watts, who was in a business dispute with Sun Alliance, one of Lord Aldington's former companies, used this information to further his own cause, printing 10,000 leaflets about Aldington's role in the matter and circulating them to politicians and other figures. Tolstoy avoided paying the damages by declaring himself bankrupt, although shortly after Aldington's death he paid £57,000 in costs to Aldington's estate.

In July 1995, the European Court of Human Rights decided unanimously that the British Government had violated Tolstoy's rights in respect of Article 10 of the Convention on Human Rights, describing the damages as "excessive and not necessary in a democratic society".

This decision referred only to the amount of the damages awarded against him and did not overturn the judgement in the libel action. The Times commented:

In its judgment yesterday in the case of Count Nikolai Tolstoy, the European Court of Human Rights ruled against Britain in important respects, finding that the award of £1.5 million levelled against the Count by a jury in 1989 amounted to a violation of his freedom of expression. Parliament will find the implications of this decision difficult to ignore.

Subsequently, allegations were made that Aldington had been materially assisted by friends at the Ministry of Defence, who had suppressed crucial documentation, but Tolstoy and Watts were refused Leave to Appeal on the basis of those findings. Nigel Watts was jailed for 18 months in April 1995, after repeating the libel that Aldington was a war criminal in a pamphlet. The sentence was reduced to nine months on appeal. In June 1995, Watts was released from prison after issuing a public apology to Aldington.

In 1996 the Court of Appeal upheld an order Aldington had obtained that made the lawyers acting for Tolstoy pro bono parties to the case, and thereby jointly liable with Tolstoy for any costs or damages awarded to Aldington. This order was combined with a requirement that Tolstoy underwrite the cost of Aldington's defence to obtain leave to appeal.

Parliament of the United Kingdom
New constituency	Member of Parliament for Blackpool North; 1945–1962	Succeeded by Norman Miscampbell
Peerage of the United Kingdom
New creation	Baron Aldington; 1962–2000	Succeeded by Charles Low
