= Albert E. Wood =

Albert Ernest Wood (1873 or 1874 – 9 April 1941) was a British barrister, active in Ireland.

Born in Norwich, Wood moved to Dublin at the age of three. He was educated at Morgan's School in Castleknock, and then at Trinity College Dublin. He became a barrister in Ireland in 1902, and in the 1920s was also admitted at Lincoln's Inn. He became a King's Counsel, and in 1931 a bencher at King's Inns. As a barrister, he specialised in defence, particularly in murder trials and matters of common law.

Wood joined the Independent Labour Party (ILP), despite the party not being active in Dublin. The ILP was affiliated to the British Labour Party, for which Wood stood unsuccessfully in Manchester Rusholme at the 1922 UK general election, and then in Royton at the 1924 and 1929 UK general elections.

Wood also advised Éamon de Valera on matters relating to whether Fianna Fáil should enter the Dail. In his spare time, he played golf.
