= Association of Certifying Factory Surgeons =

Medical practitioners certifying children as fit to work

The Association of Certifying Factory Surgeons was founded in 1888 and was based in Manchester. It was incorporated in 1910. Meetings were regularly held in other industrial towns and cities, such as Sheffield, Leeds, Birmingham and London. In 1900, a London branch was formed. It was still meeting in 1969.

Certifying surgeons were first appointed under the Factory Act 1833 which required that a child between the ages of nine and eleven required a certificate from a doctor stating that they were eligible to work. They were required to report on certain accidents and to certify that children appeared to be of a specified age and with normal bodily strength appropriate to that age. In 1874 the association reported that between 20% and 50% of those presented were rejected as either under age or unfit.

The archives of the association from 1892 to 1969 are held in The University of Manchester Library.

The 1911 Annual General Meeting was held in the Trocadero Restaurant and reported extensively in the British Medical Journal. In 1920 the BMJ reported on the unsuccessful campaign against the reduction of fees for factory surgeons associated with the wartime economies.
