= Norman Miscampbell =

British politician

Member of Parliament for Blackpool North
- In office 13 March 1962 – 16 March 1992
- Preceded by: Toby Low
- Succeeded by: Harold Elletson

Personal details
- Born: 20 February 1925 Carrickfergus, Northern Ireland
- Died: 16 February 2007 (aged 81) London, England
- Party: Conservative
- Education: Trinity College, Oxford

Norman Alexander Miscampbell, QC (20 February 1925 – 16 February 2007) was a British Conservative Party politician. He served as Member of Parliament (MP) for Blackpool North for 30 years, from 1962 to 1992, making him Blackpool's longest serving MP.

== Early life ==
Miscampbell was born in Carrickfergus in County Antrim. His grandfather owned a salt mine in Northern Ireland, and his father worked for ICI. He was educated at St Edward's School, Oxford, and served with the 4th Queen's Own Hussars in Italy and Germany during World War II, from 1943 to 1945.

He studied economics at Trinity College, Oxford, where he joined the Oxford University Conservative Association. He became a barrister, was called to the bar by Inner Temple in 1952, and worked on the Northern Circuit from chambers in Liverpool. He became a Queen's Counsel in April 1974, and a bencher in 1983.

He married Margaret Kendall in 1961. They had two sons and two daughters.

== Political career ==
Miscampbell served as a councillor on Hoylake Urban District Council from 1955 to 1961. He contested the safe Labour Party seat of Newton-le-Willows in 1955 and 1959, losing to the incumbent Fred Lee twice.

He was selected to fight Blackpool North at the by-election in March 1962, resulting from the ennoblement of the sitting Conservative MP, Toby Low, as Baron Aldington. The seat was thought to be safe—Low had majority of over 15,000—but a strong swing to the Liberals saw Miscampbell returned with a majority of less than 1,000. Two days later, Eric Lubbock won the Orpington by-election for the Liberals, overturning a Conservative majority of over 14,000 with a swing of almost 22%. The same year, Jeremy Bray, Dick Taverne, Bill Rodgers and Tam Dalyell were all elected at by-elections.

Miscampbell became a strong advocate for the interests of his seaside resort constituents, securing tax concessions for hotels and owners of holiday flats. He held the seat in the eight subsequent general elections until his retirement in at the 1992 general election. He held independent views, towards the liberal wing of the Conservative party, which were often not in sympathy with the party's mainstream orthodoxy. He supported Harold Macmillan's proposal for the UK to join the Common Market, and was one of few Conservative MPs to vote in favour of the abolition of capital punishment in December 1964. He also voted with Labour MPs to propose an oil embargo against Rhodesia in December 1964. He also opposed the creation of the Assisted Places Scheme, and sent all four of his children to comprehensive schools.

He never held ministerial office, but served as Parliamentary Private Secretary (PPS) to Sir Peter Rawlinson from 1972 to 1973, while Rawlinson was Attorney General. In the 1980s, he found his views increasingly at odds with his party's Thatcherite orthodoxy. He did not support the introduction of student loans, the abolition of the Greater London Council, and he and Sir Patrick Cormack were the only Conservative MPs publicly to refuse to support the community charge (aka poll tax) in 1986.

== Later life ==
Having failed to secure political advancement, Miscampbell increasingly concentrated on his legal career. He served as an assistant recorder and deputy circuit judge from 1976 to 1977, and as a Recorder of the Crown Court from 1977 to 1995. He was a member of the Criminal Injuries Compensation Board from March 1993 until it was wound up in March 2000.

Norman Miscampbell died of undisclosed causes at a hospital in London on 16 February 2007, four days before his 82nd birthday. His wife and their two sons and two daughters survived him.

Margaret Thatcher recommended his appointment to a knighthood, which he declined reportedly because he thought it would prevent him enjoying his retirement from political activity. His name is in the Cabinet Office list of declined honours disclosed on 26 January 2012.

Parliament of the United Kingdom
Preceded by Toby Low	Member of Parliament for Blackpool North; 1962–1992	Succeeded by Harold Elletson
